= List of Chilean telenovelas =

The production of telenovelas in Chile originates in the 1960s and has continued to this day. Los días jóvenes (1967), broadcast by Canal 13, is considered the first telenovela for its format that consists of several episodes with consecutive broadcasts and a long-term plot unlike other television formats. Since then, the production has continued to the present day and they represent one of the main sources of audience in Chilean television.

== 20th century ==
=== 1960s ===
Year	#	Name	Eps.	Release		Creator	Original network
Year	#	Name	Eps.	First aired	Last aired	Creator	Original network
1967	1	Los días jóvenes	93	1967	1967	Néstor Castagno	Canal 13
1968	2	El loco estero	—	1968	1968	Alberto Blest Gana	Canal 13
1968	3	El socio	68	1 April 1968	1968	Jenaro Prieto	Canal 13
1968	4	Incomunicados	—	1968	1968	Néstor Castagno	Canal 13
1969	5	Don Camilo	—	1969	1969	—	Canal 9
1969	6	El rosario de plata	—	1969	1969	Arturo Moya Grau	Canal 13
1969	7	La chica del bastón	—	1969	1969	Alma Bressan	Canal 13
1969	8	La señora	—	1969	1969	Miguel Mihura	Canal 13

=== 1970s ===
Year	#	Name	Eps.	Release		Creator	Original network
Year	#	Name	Eps.	First aired	Last aired	Creator	Original network
1970	9	El ídolo	—	1970	—	—	Canal 13
1970	10	Martín Rivas	45	1970	1970	Alberto Blest Gana	TVN
1970	11	El padre Gallo	—	1970	1970	Arturo Moya Grau	TVN
1971	12	El espejo	—	1971	1971	—	TVN
1971	13	La amortajada	20	1971	—	José Irrázabal	TVN
1971	14	La pendiente	—	1971	—	—	Canal 13
1972	15	La sal del desierto	145	1972	—	Alejandro Sieveking	TVN
1973	16	Fuerte Bulnes	—	1973	—	—	TVN
1974	17	O'Higgins	—	1974	—	—	TVN
1974	18	Parejas de trapo	—	1974	1974	—	TVN
1975	19	María José	66	1975	—	Arturo Moya Grau	Canal 13
1975	20	J.J. Juez	—	March 1975	September 1975	Arturo Moya Grau	Canal 13
1975	21	La colonia	—	1975	—	—	Canal 13
1975	22	La otra soledad	—	1975	1975	—	Canal 13
1976	23	Sol tardío	149	1976	1976	Arturo Moya Grau	TVN
1976	24	Tiempo de espera	—	1976	1976	—	TVN
1977	25	La colorina	88	1977	1977	Arturo Moya Grau	TVN
1977	26	El secreto de Isabel	88	21 March 1977	1977	Tito Palacios; Flor Hernández; Reinere Sanhueza	TVN
1977	27	Los amigos	—	1977	1977	—	TVN
1978	28	Historias de mi tierra	—	1978	1978	—	Canal 13
1979	29	Sonata de violín y piano	—	1979	1979	—	TVN

=== 1980s ===
Year	#	Name	Eps.	Release		Creator	Director	Original network
Year	#	Name	Eps.	First aired	Last aired	Creator	Director	Original network
1981	30	La madrastra	106	21 April 1981	18 September 1981	Arturo Moya Grau	Óscar Rodríguez	Canal 13
1981	31	Casagrande	80	8 October 1981	27 January 1982	Néstor Castagno	Ricardo de la Fuente	Canal 13
1981	32	Villa Los Aromos	55	13 October 1981	31 December 1981	Flora Hernández	Claudio Guzmán	TVN
1982	33	Alguien por quien vivir	117	15 March 1982	10 September 1982	Carlos Lozano Dana	Óscar Rodríguez	Canal 13
1982	34	De cara al mañana	67	15 March 1982	1 July 1982	María Elena Gertner	Jorge Pedreros	TVN
1982	35	Bienvenido Hermano Andes	—	12 July 1982	28 October 1982	Carlos Lozano Dana	Ricardo de la Fuente	Canal 13
1982	36	La gran mentira	—	12 July 1982	15 December 1982	Lauro César Muniz	Herval Rossano	TVN
1982	37	Celos	90	13 September 1982	31 December 1982	Alberto Migré	José Caviedes	Canal 13
1983	38	El juego de la vida	138	15 March 1983	17 October 1983	Benedito Ruy Barbosa	Herval Rossano	TVN
1983	39	La noche del cobarde	—	1 March 1983	27 July 1983	Arturo Moya Grau	Óscar Rodríguez	Canal 13
1983	40	Las herederas	125	1 August 1983	3 February 1984	Lauro Cesar Muniz	Regis Bartizzaghi	Canal 13
1984	41	Los títeres	96	4 March 1984	16 July 1984	Sergio Vodanović	Óscar Rodríguez	Canal 13
1984	42	La represa	103	12 March 1984	27 July 1984	Silvia Gutiérrez	Ricardo Vicuña	TVN
1984	43	Andrea, justicia de mujer	85	16 July 1984	23 November 1984	Jorge Díaz Saenger	Cristián Mason	Canal 13
1984	44	La torre 10	104	30 July 1984	21 December 1984	Néstor Castagno	Vicente Sabatini	TVN
1985	45	Matrimonio de papel	50	11 March 1985	17 May 1985	Lenon Merino	Óscar Rodríguez	Canal 13
1985	46	La trampa	65	22 May 1985	14 October 1985	Arturo Moya Grau	Cristián Mason	Canal 13
1985	47	Marta a las ocho	22	2 July 1985	1 August 1985	Fernando Aragón	Vicente Sabatini	TVN
1985	48	Morir de amor	101	2 August 1985	30 December 1985	María Elena Gertner	Vicente Sabatini	TVN
1985	49	El prisionero de la medianoche	38	16 October 1985	12 December 1985	Lenon Merino	Cristián Mason	Canal 13
1986	50	La dama del balcón	86	2 January 1986	5 April 1986	María Elena Gertner	Ricardo Vicuña	TVN
1986	51	La villa	187	3 March 1986	18 December 1986	Néstor Castagno	Ricardo Vicuña	TVN
1986	52	Ángel malo	110	11 March 1986	1 August 1986	Cassiano Gabus Mendes	Óscar Rodríguez	Canal 13
1986	53	Secreto de familia	92	4 August 1986	11 December 1986	Sergio Vodanović	Cristián Mason	Canal 13
1987	54	La invitación	70	8 April 1987	15 July 1987	Ivani Ribeiro	Óscar Rodríguez	Canal 13
1987	55	Mi nombre es Lara	94	27 April 1987	16 October 1987	Celia Alcántara	Ricardo Vicuña	TVN
1987	56	La última cruz	103	15 July 1987	1 January 1988	Arturo Moya Grau	Cristián Mason	Canal 13
1988	57	Bellas y audaces	101	7 March 1988	15 August 1988	Cassiano Gabus Mendes	Ricardo Vicuña	TVN
1988	58	Semidiós	125	7 March 1988	2 September 1988	Janete Clair	Óscar Rodríguez	Canal 13
1988	59	Vivir así	41	12 September 1988	11 November 1988	Egon Wolff	Vicente Sabatini	Canal 13
1988	60	Las dos caras del amor	60	17 October 1988	23 December 1988	Fernando Aragón	Vicente Sabatini	TVN
1988	61	Matilde dedos verdes	40	14 November 1988	23 December 1988	Alejandro Sieveking	Óscar Rodríguez	Canal 13
1989	62	La intrusa	87	27 March 1989	29 July 1989	Sergio Vodanović	Cristián Mason	Canal 13
1989	63	A la sombra del ángel	97	29 May 1989	13 October 1989	Néstor Castagno	René Schneider Arce	TVN
1989	64	Bravo	100	1 August 1989	11 December 1989	Janete Clair	Alejandro Rojas	Canal 13

=== 1990s ===
Year	#	Name	Eps.	Release		Creator	Director	Original network
Year	#	Name	Eps.	First aired	Last aired	Creator	Director	Original network
1990	65	¿Te conté?	110	16 April 1990	7 September 1990	Cassiano Gabus Mendes	Óscar Rodríguez	Canal 13
1990	66	Acércate más	96	5 September 1990	11 January 1991	Silvio de Abreu	Ricardo Vicuña	Canal 13
1990	67	El milagro de vivir	78	10 September 1990	28 December 1990	María Elena Gertner	Vicente Sabatini	TVN
1991	68	Villa Nápoli	98	1 April 1991	15 August 1991	Sergio Vodanović	Óscar Rodríguez	Canal 13
1991	69	Volver a empezar	110	1 April 1991	30 August 1991	Jorge Marchant Lazcano	Vicente Sabatini	TVN
1991	70	Ellas por ellas	81	19 August 1991	20 December 1991	Cassiano Gabus Mendes	Ricardo Vicuña	Canal 13
1992	71	Trampas y caretas	105	23 March 1992	20 August 1992	Lauro César Muniz	Vicente Sabatini	TVN
1992	72	El palo al gato	65	23 March 1992	26 June 1992	Braulio Pedroso	Óscar Rodríguez	Canal 13
1992	73	Fácil de amar	92	17 August 1992	30 December 1992	Cassiano Gabus Mendes	Cristián Mason	Canal 13
1993	74	Jaque mate	95	8 March 1993	23 July 1993	Chico de Assis	Vicente Sabatini	TVN
1993	75	Marrón Glacé	100	15 March 1993	30 July 1993	Cassiano Gabus Mendes	Óscar Rodríguez	Canal 13
1993	76	Ámame	97	2 August 1993	21 December 1993	Néstor Castagno	María Eugenia Rencoret	TVN
1993	77	Doble juego	113	2 August 1993	10 December 1993	Sergio Vodanović	Ricardo Vicuña	Canal 13
1994	78	Rompecorazón	98	14 March 1994	2 August 1994	Cassiano Gabus Mendes	Vicente Sabatini	TVN
1994	79	Champaña	92	14 March 1994	22 July 1994	Cassiano Gabus Mendes	Cristián Mason	Canal 13
1994	80	Rojo y miel	90	3 August 1994	15 December 1994	Néstor Castagno	María Eugenia Rencoret	TVN
1994	81	Top secret	85	3 August 1994	9 December 1994	Janete Clair	Óscar Rodríguez	Canal 13
1995	82	Estúpido Cupido	112	13 March 1995	16 August 1995	Jorge Marchant Lazcano	Vicente Sabatini	TVN
1995	83	El amor está de moda	85	13 March 1995	17 July 1995	Cassiano Gabus Mendes	Ricardo Vicuña	Canal 13
1995	84	Amor a domicilio	102	24 July 1995	14 December 1995	José Ignacio Valenzuela	Cristián Mason	Canal 13
1995	85	Juegos de fuego	88	17 August 1995	21 December 1995	Janete Clair	María Eugenia Rencoret	TVN
1996	86	Sucupira	108	11 March 1996	9 August 1996	Dias Gomes	Vicente Sabatini	TVN
1996	87	Marrón Glacé, el regreso	97	11 March 1996	26 July 1996	Fernando Aragón	Óscar Rodríguez	Canal 13
1996	88	Adrenalina	103	29 July 1996	21 December 1996	Pablo Illanes	Ricardo Vicuña	Canal 13
1996	89	Loca piel	91	12 August 1996	21 December 1996	Perla Devoto	María Eugenia Rencoret	TVN
1997	90	Oro verde	104	10 March 1997	5 August 1997	Alfredo Rates	Vicente Sabatini	TVN
1997	91	Eclipse de luna	94	10 March 1997	25 July 1997	Patricia Araya	Cristián Mason	Canal 13
1997	92	Rossabella	95	10 March 1997	23 July 1997	Alfredo Rates	Herval Abreu	Mega
1997	93	Santiago city	17	23 July 1997	14 August 1997	Jorge Abelleira	Helvio Soto	Mega
1997	94	Playa salvaje	110	21 July 1997	19 December 1997	Pablo Illanes	Óscar Rodríguez	Canal 13
1997	95	Tic tac	90	6 August 1997	15 December 199̈7	Perla Devoto	María Eugenia Rencoret	TVN
1998	96	Iorana	103	9 March 1998	31 July 1998	Enrique Cintolesi	Vicente Sabatini	TVN
1998	97	Amándote	105	9 March 1998	31 July 1998	Ricardo Vicuña	Ricardo Vicuña	Canal 13
1998	98	A todo dar	153	9 March 1998	10 October 1998	Alfredo Rates	Herval Abreu	Mega
1998	99	Borrón y cuenta nueva	103	3 August 1998	30 December 1998	Alfredo Sepúlveda	Leonardo Rojas	TVN
1998	100	Marparaíso	102	3 August 1998	22 December 1998	José Ignacio Valenzuela	Cristián Mason	Canal 13
1999	101	La fiera	106	8 March 1999	3 August 1999	Víctor Carrasco	Vicente Sabatini	TVN
1999	102	Fuera de control	97	8 March 1999	30 July 1999	Pablo Illanes	Óscar Rodríguez	Canal 13
1999	103	Algo está cambiando	97	8 March 1999	23 July 1999	Alfredo Rates	Herval Abreu	Mega
1999	104	Aquelarre	105	4 August 1999	29 December 1999	Hugo Morales	María Eugenia Rencoret	TVN
1999	105	Cerro Alegre	100	4 August 1999	22 December 1999	Coca Gómez	Cristián Mason	Canal 13

== 21st century ==
=== 2000s ===
Year	#	Name	Eps.	Release		Creator	Director	Original network
Year	#	Name	Eps.	First aired	Last aired	Creator	Director	Original network
2000	106	Sabor a ti	124	1 March 2000	11 August 2000	José Ignacio Valenzuela	Cristián Mason	Canal 13
2000	107	Romané	115	6 March 2000	15 August 2000	Sergio Bravo	Vicente Sabatini	TVN
2000	108	Santo ladrón	93	16 August 2000	29 December 2000	Néstor Castagno	María Eugenia Rencoret	TVN
2001	109	Corazón pirata	106	5 March 2001	3 August 2001	Jimmy Daccarett	Óscar Rodríguez	Canal 13
2001	110	Pampa Ilusión	114	7 March 2001	3 August 2001	Víctor Carrasco	Vicente Sabatini	TVN
2001	111	Amores de mercado	103	6 August 2001	28 December 2001	Fernando Aragón	María Eugenia Rencoret	TVN
2001	112	Piel canela	69	6 August 2001	16 November 2001	Coca Gómez	Cristián Mason	Canal 13
2002	113	El circo de las Montini	125	11 March 2002	9 August 2002	Víctor Carrasco	Vicente Sabatini	TVN
2002	114	Buen partido	95	5 August 2002	23 December 2002	Adrián Suar	Rodolfo Antúnez	Canal 13
2002	115	Purasangre	114	12 August 2002	20 January 2003	Alejandro Cabrera	María Eugenia Rencoret	TVN
2003	116	Puertas adentro	112	10 March 2003	15 August 2003	Víctor Carrasco	Vicente Sabatini	TVN
2003	117	Machos	163	10 March 2003	27 October 2003	Verónica Saquel	Herval Abreu	Canal 13
2003	118	16	98	9 June 2003	22 October 2003	Marcelo Leonart	Víctor Huerta	TVN
2003	119	Pecadores	95	18 August 2003	30 December 2003	Alejandro Cabrera	María Eugenia Rencoret	TVN
2003	120	Amores urbanos	80	agosto de 2003	enero de 2004	Rodrigo González	Álex Hernández	Mega
2004	121	Los Pincheira	127	8 March 2004	3 September 2004	Víctor Carrasco	Vicente Sabatini	TVN
2004	122	Hippie	109	8 March 2004	13 August 2004	Néstor Castagno	Cristián Galaz	Canal 13
2004	123	Destinos cruzados	108	6 September 2004	4 February 2005	Pablo Illanes	María Eugenia Rencoret	TVN
2004	124	Tentación	110	6 September 2004	9 February 2005	Sebastián Arrau	Herval Abreu	Canal 13
2004	125	Xfea2	115	14 September 2004	8 February 2005	Rodrigo González	Álex Hernández	Mega
2004	126	Ídolos	84	25 October 2004	16 March 2005	Alejandro Cabrera	Óscar Rodríguez	TVN
2005	127	17	93	3 January 2005	18 May 2005	Marcelo Leonart	Víctor Huerta	TVN
2005	128	Los Capo	124	7 March 2005	5 September 2005	Víctor Carrasco	Vicente Sabatini	TVN
2005	129	Brujas	135	7 March 2005	14 September 2005	Néstor Castagno	Guillermo Helo	Canal 13
2005	130	Los treinta	70	25 April 2005	4 August 2005	Marcelo Leonart	Víctor Huerta	TVN
2005	131	EsCool	79	3 May 2005	26 August 2005	Mateo Iribarren	Álex Hernández	Mega
2005	132	Mitú	—	19 August 2005	3 January 2006	Mateo Iribarren	Álex Hernández	Mega
2005	133	Versus	90	29 August 2005	30 December 2005	Pablo Illanes	María Eugenia Rencoret	TVN
2005	134	Gatas y tuercas	125	13 September 2005	7 March 2006	Sebastián Arrau	Herval Abreu	Canal 13
2006	135	Amor en tiempo récord	44	2 January 2006	3 March 2006	María José Galleguillos	Víctor Huerta	TVN
2006	136	Entre medias	66	1 March 2006	2 June 2006	Francisca Fuenzalida	Óscar Rodríguez	TVN
2006	137	Cómplices	155	6 March 2006	10 October 2006	Víctor Carrasco	Vicente Sabatini	TVN
2006	138	Descarado	145	6 March 2006	26 September 2006	Néstor Castagno	Guillermo Helo	Canal 13
2006	139	Porky te amo	—	14 March 2006	30 June 2006	Mateo Iribarren	Álex Hernández	Mega
2006	140	Charly Tango	52	27 September 2006	8 December 2006	Fernando Aragón	Herval Abreu	Canal 13
2006	141	Disparejas	63	2 October 2006	29 December 2006	Marcelo Leonart	Germán Barriga	TVN
2006	142	Floribella	106	11 October 2006	9 March 2007	Cris Morena	Víctor Huerta	TVN
2006	143	Montecristo	94	16 October 2006	15 March 2007	Adriana Lorenzón	Víctor Stella	Mega
2007	144	Vivir con 10	105	8 January 2007	5 June 2007	Coca Gómez	Ricardo Vicuña	Chilevisión
2007	145	Corazón de María	122	12 March 2007	3 September 2007	Parla Devoto	Vicente Sabatini	TVN
2007	146	Papi Ricky	135	12 March 2007	1 October 2007	Sebastián Arrau	Ítalo Galleani	Canal 13
2007	147	Alguien te mira	78	30 April 2007	16 August 2007	Pablo Illanes	Germán Barriga	TVN
2007	148	Fortunato	93	28 August 2007	9 January 2008	Adriana Lorenzón	Andrés Canale	Mega
2007	149	Amor por accidente	84	3 September 2007	28 December 2007	Marcelo Leonart	Víctor Huerta	TVN
2007	150	Lola	276	26 September 2007	4 November 2008	Susana Cardozo	Ítalo Galleani	Canal 13
2008	151	Don Amor	126	3 March 2008	1 September 2008	José Ignacio Valenzuela	Guillermo Helo	Canal 13
2008	152	Mala conducta	182	3 March 2008	19 November 2008	Coca Gómez	Ricardo Vicuña	Chilevisión
2008	153	Viuda Alegre	123	10 March 2008	1 September 2008	Nicolás Quesille	Vicente Sabatini	TVN
2008	154	El señor de La Querencia	64	12 May 2008	2 September 2008	Víctor Carrasco	Germán Barriga	TVN
2008	155	Hijos del Monte	131	2 September 2008	10 March 2009	Víctor Carrasco	Víctor Huerta	TVN
2009	156	Cuenta conmigo	106	2 March 2009	21 August 2009	José Ignacio Valenzuela	Ítalo Galleani	Canal 13
2009	157	Los exitosos Pells	142	3 March 2009	22 September 2009	Sebastián Ortega	Germán Barriga	TVN
2009	158	¿Dónde está Elisa?	112	21 April 2009	4 November 2009	Pablo Illanes	Rodrigo Velásquez	TVN
2009	159	Corazón rebelde	80	18 August 2009	16 December 2009	Cris Morena	Herval Abreu	Canal 13
2009	160	Sin anestesia	101	24 August 2009	18 January 2010	Sergio Bravo	Patricio González	Chilevisión
2009	161	Los Ángeles de Estela	121	22 September 2009	19 March 2010	Hugo Morales	Rodrigo Velásquez	TVN
2009	162	Conde Vrolok	104	3 November 2009	2 June 2010	Rodrigo Ossandón	Víctor Huerta	TVN

=== 2010s ===
Year	#	Name	Eps.	Release		Creator	Director	Original network
Year	#	Name	Eps.	First aired	Last aired	Creator	Director	Original network
2010	163	Mujeres de lujo	78	4 January 2010	27 May 2010	Coca Gómez	Patricio González	Chilevisión
2010	164	Feroz	122	8 March 2010	27 August 2010	Sebastián Freund	Roberto Rebolledo	Canal 13
2010	165	Manuel Rodríguez	109	15 March 2010	18 August 2010	Fernando Aragón	Vicente Sabatini	Chilevisión
2010	166	Martín Rivas	125	15 March 2010	6 September 2010	Víctor Carrasco	Germán Barriga	TVN
2010	167	40 y tantos	134	12 July 2010	10 March 2011	Marcelo Leonart	Ítalo Galleani	TVN
2010	168	Primera dama	127	30 August 2010	9 March 2011	Sebastián Arrau	Herval Abreu	Canal 13
2010	169	La familia de al lado	125	6 September 2010	7 March 2011	José Ignacio Valenzuela	Víctor Huerta	TVN
2010	170	Don diablo	55	27 September 2010	28 December 2010	Yusef Rumie	Rodrigo González	Chilevisión
2011	171	Infiltradas	79	3 January 2011	26 May 2011	Coca Gómez	Patricio González	Chilevisión
2011	172	Témpano	123	7 March 2011	8 September 2011	Pablo Illanes	Germán Barriga	TVN
2011	173	El laberinto de Alicia	111	14 March 2011	5 October 2011	Nona Fernández	Rodrigo Velásquez	TVN
2011	174	Vampiras	125	6 April 2011	9 November 2011	Yusef Rumie	Alex Hernández	Chilevisión
2011	175	Peleles	83	26 July 2011	15 January 2012	Rodrigo Cuevas	Roberto Rebolledo	Canal 13
2011	176	Esperanza	106	29 August 2011	23 January 2012	Alejandro Cabrera	Claudio López de Lérida	TVN
2011	177	Aquí mando yo	160	12 September 2011	23 April 2012	Daniella Castagno	Ítalo Galleani	TVN
2011	178	La Doña	92	4 October 2011	4 April 2012	Carlos Galofré	Vicente Sabatini	Chilevisión
2011	179	Su nombre es Joaquín	87	5 October 2011	5 March 2012	Víctor Carrasco	Víctor Huerta	TVN
2011	180	Decibel 110	60	12 October 2011	15 April 2012	María Luisa Hurtado	José Tomás Larraín	Mega
2012	181	Gordis	83	2 January 2012	23 May 2012	Yusef Rumie	Alex Hernández	Chilevisión
2012	182	Reserva de familia	123	19 March 2012	22 October 2012	Pablo Illanes	Patricio González	TVN
2012	183	Soltera otra vez	225	27 May 2012	12 September 2018	Carolina Aguirre	Herval Abreu	Canal 13
2012	184	Pobre rico	227	23 April 2012	11 March 2013	Alejandro Cabrera	Rodrigo Velásquez	TVN
2012	185	Maldita	43	22 May 2012	2 August 2012	Mateo Iribarren	Guillermo Helo	Mega
2012	186	Dama y obrero	189	11 June 2012	11 March 2013	José Ignacio Valenzuela	Claudio López de Lérida	TVN
2012	187	La sexóloga	90	24 September 2012	7 March 2013	Coca Gómez	Vicente Sabatini	Chilevisión
2012	188	Separados	123	22 October 2012	3 June 2013	Daniella Castagno	Ítalo Galleani	TVN
2013	189	Graduados	212	3 March 2013	10 January 2014	Sebastián Ortega	Mauricio Bustos	Chilevisión
2013	190	Dos por uno	117	11 March 2013	23 August 2013	Sebastián Arrau	Víctor Huerta	TVN
2013	191	Solamente Julia	150	11 March 2013	10 October 2013	Camila Villagrán	Christian Maringer	TVN
2013	192	Las Vega's	77	17 March 2013	17 July 2013	Paulina Braithwaite	Roberto Rebolledo	Canal 13
2013	193	Socias	115	3 June 2013	6 January 2014	Marta Betoldi	Patricio González	TVN
2013	194	Somos los Carmona	151	19 August 2013	24 March 2014	Carlos Oporto	Claudio López de Lérida	TVN
2013	195	El regreso	140	14 October 2013	5 May 2014	Larissa Contreras	Nicolás Alemparte	TVN
2013	196	Secretos en el jardín	101	24 November 2013	9 June 2014	Julio Rojas	Rodrigo Velásquez	Canal 13
2014	197	Vuelve temprano	118	6 January 2014	4 August 2014	Daniella Castagno	Víctor Huerta	TVN
2014	198	Las 2 Carolinas	136	2 March 2014	12 September 2014	Víctor Carrasco	Vicente Sabatini	Chilevisión
2014	199	Mamá mechona	117	3 March 2014	19 August 2014	Sergio Díaz	Germán Barriga	Canal 13
2014	200	El amor lo manejo yo	149	24 March 2014	22 October 2014	Enrique Estevanez	Christian Maringer	TVN
2014	201	Volver a amar	140	5 May 2014	1 December 2014	Camila Villagrán	Felipe Arratia	TVN
2014	202	Chipe libre	97	3 August 2014	26 January 2015	Carla Stagno	Herval Abreu	Canal 13
2014	203	No abras la puerta	74	4 August 2014	14 January 2015	Julio Rojas	Ítalo Galleani	TVN
2014	204	Pituca sin lucas	153	13 October 2014	25 May 2015	Rodrigo Bastidas	Patricio González	Mega
2014	205	Valió la pena	73	19 October 2014	19 February 2015	Patricia González	Enrique Bravo	Canal 13
2014	206	Caleta del sol	67	20 October 2014	21 January 2015	Carlos Oporto	Claudio López de Lérida	TVN
2014	207	La chúcara	190	1 December 2014	26 August 2015	Julio Rojas	Matías Stagnaro	TVN
2015	208	Dueños del paraíso	69	19 January 2015	9 June 2015	Pablo Illanes	Víctor Huerta	TVN
2015	209	La poseída	73	17 May 2015	12 October 2015	Josefina Fernández	Víctor Huerta	TVN
2015	210	Matriarcas	141	18 May 2015	30 December 2015	Sebastián Arrau	Ítalo Galleani	TVN
2015	211	Papá a la deriva	183	25 May 2015	29 February 2016	Daniella Castagno	Felipe Arratia	Mega
2015	212	Eres mi tesoro	171	29 July 2015	6 April 2016	Yusef Rumie	Nicolás Alemparte	Mega
2015	213	Esa no soy yo	162	24 August 2015	11 April 2016	Camila Villagrán	Christian Maringer	TVN
2015	214	Buscando a María	64	9 December 2015	11 March 2016	Víctor Carrasco	Roberto Morales	Chilevisión
2016	215	Veinteañero a los 40	93	3 January 2016	26 July 2016	Sergio Díaz	Germán Barriga	Canal 13
2016	216	Pobre gallo	160	6 January 2016	22 August 2016	Rodrigo Bastidas	Nicolás Alemparte	Mega
2016	217	Te doy la vida	158	5 April 2016	23 November 2016	María José Galleguillos	Claudio López de Lérida	Mega
2016	218	Señores papis	145	28 June 2016	6 March 2017	Marcela Guerty	Patricio González	Mega
2016	219	Preciosas	94	1 August 2016	31 January 2017	Catalina Calcagni	Herval Abreu	Canal 13
2016	220	El camionero	149	15 August 2016	14 March 2017	Vicente Sabatini	Ítalo Galleani	TVN
2016	221	Ámbar	158	22 August 2016	10 April 2017	Daniella Castagno	Felipe Arratia	Mega
2016	222	Amanda	170	22 November 2016	25 July 2017	Luis Ponce	Matías Stagnaro	Mega
2017	223	Un diablo con ángel	70	2 January 2017	8 May 2017	Julio Rojas	Matías Stagnaro	TVN
2017	224	Perdona nuestros pecados	312	6 March 2017	22 August 2018	Pablo Illanes	Nicolás Alemparte	Mega
2017	225	La colombiana	143	8 March 2017	28 September 2017	Eugenio García	Germán Barriga	TVN
2017	226	Tranquilo papá	187	10 April 2017	9 January 2018	Rodrigo Bastidas	Claudio López de Lérida	Mega
2017	227	Verdades ocultas	1128	24 July 2017	22 June 2022	Carlos Oporto	Felipe Arratia	Mega
2017	228	Wena profe	159	25 September 2017	11 May 2018	Carlos Galofré	Rodrigo Meneses	TVN
2017	229	Dime quién fue	97	12 November 2017	13 May 2018	Marcelo Castañón	Germán Barriga	TVN
2018	230	Si yo fuera rico	172	8 January 2018	2 October 2018	Rodrigo Cuevas	Víctor Huerta	Mega
2018	231	Casa de muñecos	128	20 August 2018	11 March 2019	Nona Fernández	Patricio González	Mega
2018	232	Pacto de sangre	133	24 September 2018	28 May 2019	Felipe Montero	Cristián Mason	Canal 13
2018	233	Isla Paraíso	233	2 October 2018	4 September 2019	Alejandro Cabrera	Matías Stagnaro	Mega
2018	234	La reina de Franklin	97	19 November 2018	2 May 2019	Nelson Pedrero	Diego Rougier	Canal 13
2019	235	Amar a morir	126	4 March 2019	30 September 2019	Carlos Espinoza	César Opazo	TVN
2019	236	Juegos de poder	161	11 March 2019	12 December 2019	Luis Ponce	Patricio González	Mega
2019	237	Río Oscuro	94	27 May 2019	15 November 2019	Víctor Carrasco	Cristián Mason	Canal 13
2019	238	Amor a la Catalán	124	6 July 2019	20 February 2020	Andrea Franco	Vicente Sabatini	Canal 13
2019	239	Gemelas	156	4 August 2019	9 June 2020	Sebastián Ortega	Rodrigo Velásquez	Chilevisión
2019	240	Yo soy Lorenzo	148	2 September 2019	25 May 2020	Daniella Castagno	Nicolás Alemparte	Mega
2019	241	100 días para enamorarse	152	9 December 2019	14 March 2021	Sebastián Ortega	Enrique Bravo	Mega

=== 2020s ===
Year	#	Name	Eps.	Release		Creator	Director	Original network
Year	#	Name	Eps.	First aired	Last aired	Creator	Director	Original network
2021	242	Edificio Corona	120	11 January 2021	9 August 2021	Rodrigo Bastidas; Daniella Castagno	Nicolás Alemparte	Mega
2021	243	Demente	140	15 March 2021	23 November 2021	Pablo Illanes	Patricio González	Mega
2021	244	La torre de Mabel	143	14 June 2021	24 February 2022	Julio Rojas	Cristián Mason	Canal 13
2021	245	Pobre novio	134	9 August 2021	7 June 2022	Alejandro Cabrera	Matías Stagnaro	Mega
2021	246	Amar profundo	156	23 November 2021	24 August 2022	Jonathan Cuchacovich	Víctor Huerta	Mega
2022	247	La ley de Baltazar	221	7 June 2022	10 May 2023	Daniella Castagno; Rodrigo Bastidas	Nicolás Alemparte	Mega
2022	248	Hasta encontrarte	98	22 June 2022	12 December 2022	Ximena Carrera; María José Galleguillos	Víctor Huerta	Mega
2022	249	Hijos del desierto	163	23 August 2022	5 June 2023	Pablo Ávila	Patricio González	Mega
2023	250	Juego de ilusiones	TBA	16 January 2023	TBA	Verónica Saquel; Carlos Oporto	Matías Stagnaro	Mega
2023	251	Como la vida misma	TBA	9 May 2023	TBA	Marcelo Castañón; Valentina Pollarolo	Felipe Arratia	Mega
2023	252	Generación 98	TBA	5 June 2023	TBA	Pablo Illanes	Nicolás Alemparte	Mega
2023	253	Dime con quién andas	TBA	20 June 2023	TBA	Josefina Fernández; Javier Goldschmied; Francisca Bernardi	Mauro Scandolari	Chilevisión
2024	254	Secretos de familia	TBA	10 March 2024	TBA	Catalina Calcagni; Felipe Montero	Roberto Rebolledo	Canal 13

== See also ==
- List of Chilean actors
- Cinema of Chile
