= Íngrid Cruz =

Chilean actress (born 1975)

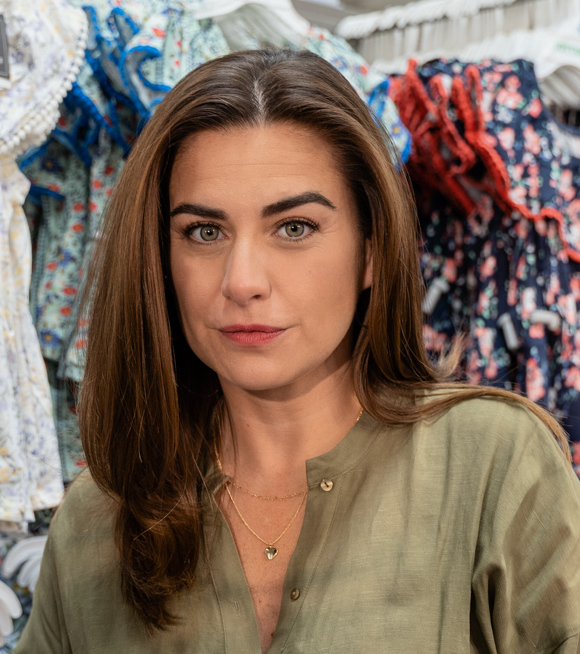
- Cruz in 2018
- Born: Ingrid Elena Cruz Toro; 1 July 1975 (age 51); Antofagasta, Chile
- Education: Academy Theater Club
- Occupation: Actress
- Years active: 1998–present
- Parent(s): Norman Cruz (Father); Sara Toro (Mother)

Ingrid Elena Cruz Toro (born 1 July 1975 in Antofagasta) is a Chilean actress, known for her roles in Brujas (2005), Somos los Carmona (2013–2014), Pituca sin lucas (2014–2015) and Demente (2021).

== Biography ==
Born as Ingrid Elena Cruz Toro, in Antofagasta, on 1 July 1975, she is the daughter of Norman Cruz, a notary and real estate conservator in the city, and Sara Toro, a secretary. Her father is from El Salvador, he came to Chile after the war. He studied as a lawyer in Antofagasta.

Her studies were carried out at the Experimental Artistic Lyceum and at the Colegio Instituto Santa María Antofagasta. She later moved to Santiago to study acting at the Fernando González Mardones Theater Club Academy, graduating in 1998. In 2007, she had her first daughter with Leo Scheinffelt, Emilia Scheinffelt. In 2014, she separated from Leo, staying alone with Emilia.

== Career ==
Ingrid Cruz made her television debut with the telenovela Marparaíso (1998) on Canal 13, sharing credits with Cristián Campos and Jorge Zabaleta. Next, she worked for ten years at Canal 13, under the orders of Verónica Saquel.

During this period, she appeared in commercially successful telenovelas such as Machos in 2003, Brujas in 2005 and Lola in 2007, in which she became known despite not having a leading role. In 2009, Canal 13 decided not to renew Cruz's contract, because they preferred to promote actresses with greater prominence in the television industry, as was the case with Tamara Acosta and Blanca Lewin.

After a time without many appearances on television, María Eugenia Rencoret gives her the opportunity to antagonize the daytime soap opera Esperanza (2011), with great success. Since then, she has been directing her career towards a more commercial side, becoming an advertising face. She would continue on TVN in the evening Reserva de familia (2012) and with the evening show Somos los Carmona (2013).

In 2014, Cruz emigrated to Mega together with Rencoret, who forms a new dramatic area for the channel. Íngrid gets the main antagonist in the evening show Pituca sin lucas (2014), which ends up being a hit for the timeslot. She would continue to be linked to Mega in various productions; She also served as a judge on the show The Switch on the same channel. She recently starred in Mega's Demente, as Javiera Cáceres alongside Patricia Rivadeneira, who played Flavia Betantcourt.

== Personal life ==
Ingrid has a daughter, Emilia.

== Filmography ==
=== Series ===
Year	Title	Role	Channel
2007	Dinastía Sa Sá		Canal 13
2007	Héroes	Agustina	Canal 13
2020	Historias de cuarentena		Mega

=== Programs ===
Year	Title	Role	Channel
2000	Sin mochila	Driver	Canal 13
2015; 2017–2018	The Switch	Jury	Mega
2021	Sana Tentación	Conductor	Mega

=== Films ===
Year	Title	Role	Director
2003	The Chosen One	Inés	Nacho Argiró & Gabriel López
2013	VideoClub	Wanda	Pablo Illanes
2013	Barrio Universitario	Ejecutiva	Esteban Vidal
2013	El vuelo del Manutara		
2016	Prueba de actitud	Cecilia	

=== Television ===
==== Telenovelas ====
Year	Title	Role	Channel
1998	Marparaíso	Sofía Carrasco	Canal 13
1999	Cerro Alegre	Karina Astudillo	Canal 13
2001	Corazón Pirata	Cynthia Cáceres	Canal 13
2003	Machos	Belén Cruchaga	Canal 13
2004	Hippie	Catalina Villalobos	Canal 13
2005	Brujas	Gretel Schmidt	Canal 13
2006	Descarado	Caroline Martínez	Canal 13
2007–2008	Lola	Grace Fernández	Canal 13
2009	Cuenta Conmigo	Lídia Peña	Canal 13
2011	Esperanza	Beatriz Solovera	TVN
2012	Reserva de familia	Ema Ruiz-Tagle	TVN
2013	Los Carmona	Isabel Durán	TVN
2014	Pituca Sin Lucas	Stella González	Mega
2016	Pobre Gallo	Carola García del Río	Mega
2017	Tranquilo papá	Pamela Morales	Mega
2019	Juegos de poder	Karen Franco	Mega
2021	Demente	Javiera Cáceres	Mega
2024	Nuevo amores de mercado	Alicia "Pastora" Rubilar	Mega

== Music Videos ==
Year	Title	Artist	Director
2013	Es muy tarde	Jorge Gonzalez	Esteban Vidal

== Theatre ==
- Un dios salvaje (2013)

== Advertising ==
- Tottus ( 2012–present), along with Iván Zamorano (2014–2015) and Álvaro Rudolphy (2015–2016).

== Awards and nominations ==
Year	Award	Category	Production	Result
2005	APES Awards	Best Supporting Actress	Brujas	Nominated
2008	APES Awards	Best Supplementary Performance	Lola	Nominated
2015	Reina Guachaca	Most Popular Actress	Pituca sin lucas	Nominated
2015	Golden Copihue	Best Popular Actress	Pituca sin lucas	Winner
2016	Premios Caleuche	Best Leading Actress	Pituca sin lucas	Nominated
2018	Golden Copihue	Best Popular Actress	Tranquilo papá	Nominated
2019	Golden Copihue	Best Popular Actress	Juegos de poder	Nominated
2022	Premios Caleuche	Best Supporting Actress	Demente	Nominated

== Acknowledgements ==
- 1994 – Queen of the City of Antofagasta .
