= Gabriela Hernández =

Chilean actress (born 1939)

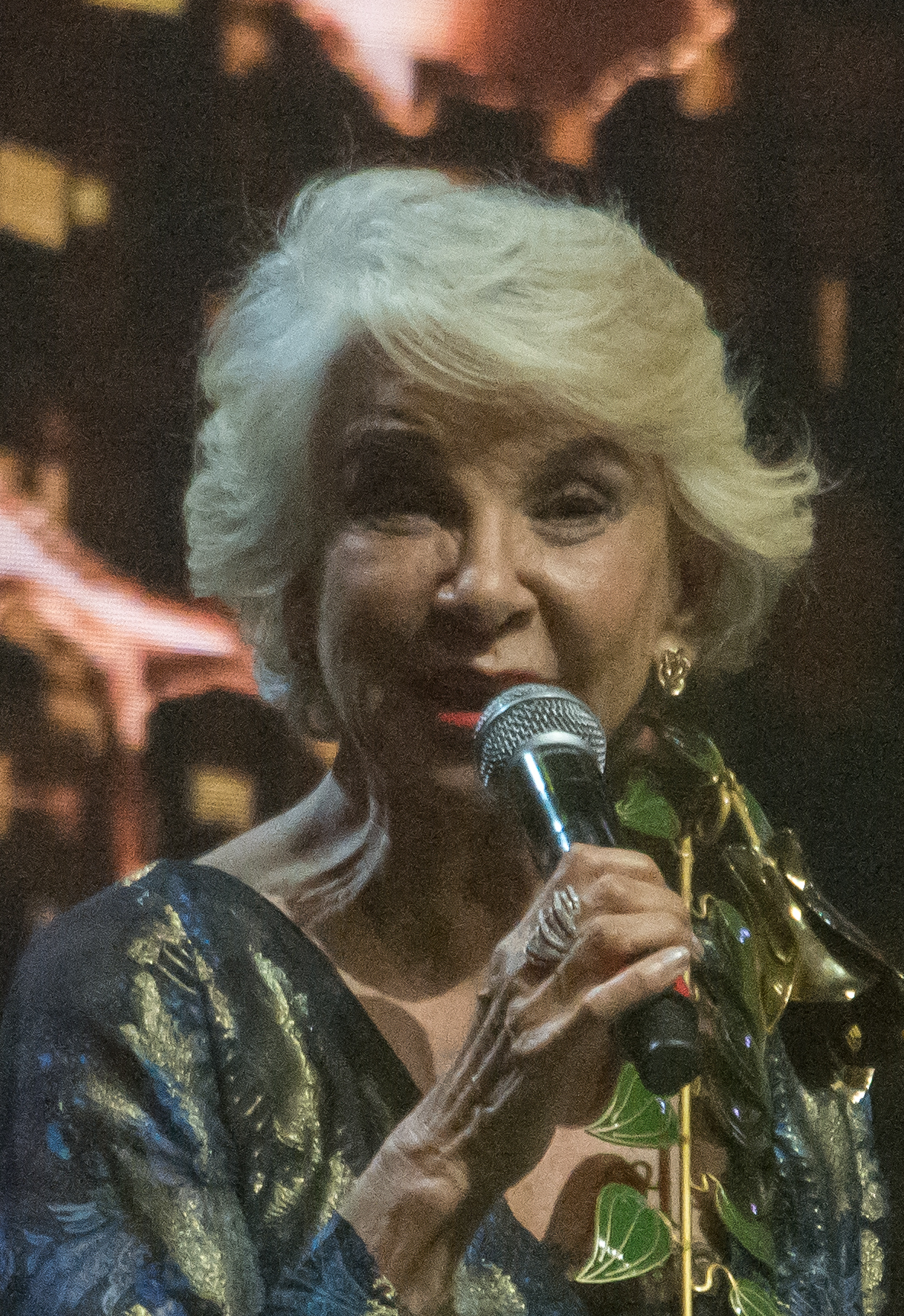
- Gaby Hernández in 2018
- Born: María Gabriela Hernández Gómez; January 15, 1939 (age 87); Valdivia
- Education: University of Chile
- Occupation: Actress
- Years active: 1960–present
- Spouse: José María Montero (until 1982)
- Children: 1

María Gabriela Hernández Gómez (born January 15, 1939), also known as Gaby Hernández, is a Chilean theater, film and television actress with a long active career.

== Early life and education ==
Her father was from Castilla, Spain, and her mother of Chilean origin. She is the younger sister of Nieves Hernández and also actress Naldy Hernández.

Her childhood was in Valdivia and in her adolescence she moved to Santiago, where she graduated from secondary education at Liceo Experimental Manuel de Salas. At age 10 she entered the National Conservatory of Music, where she enhanced her skills for the piano.

She studied theater at the School of Theater of the University of Chile, where she was a generation partner of Sonia Mena, Lucy Salgado and Diana Sanz. As a student, she participated in the play La casa de Bernarda Alba from 1960, alongside actresses such as Marés González, Bélgica Castro, María Cánepa, Carmen Bunster, Claudia Paz and María Teresa Fricke.

== Career ==
=== 1960s ===
In 1962 she made her professional debut in the role of Cornelia in the first version of El abanderado by Luis Alberto Heiremans, in the Antonio Varas Room of the same university. For a short time she worked at the company Los mimos de Noisvander by Enrique Noisvander. During this period, she also participated in the magazine Cine Amor, starring in several fotonovelas.

In 1964, she replaced Carmen Barros in the leading role of Carmela in the second world tour of Isidora Aguirre's La pergola de las flores, with great international success.

At the age of 24, after the tour of the play, the Spanish producer Luis de Llano Palmer offered him an exclusive contract on Televisa, settling in Mexico for five years, working on television in productions such as Rocambole and various Mexican television programs. During this period she worked in theater plays and musical shows of Cabaret, dancer of the Latin Show Ballet of Chavela Vargas. She also studied Jazz dance at the John di Martino Academy. Subsequently, she worked for two years in Washington D.C., United States.

=== 1970s ===
During the 1970s, she settled in Spain performing various theater productions. There she worked in theater together with Josep Maria Pou, at the María Guerrero Theater, in productions by various renowned playwrights, with great success.

=== 1980s ===
After more than 15 years away from her native country, where she developed an acting career mainly in Mexico, the United States and Spain, she returned to Chile in 1988 to vote in favor of the No campaign in the military dictatorship in the 1988 Chilean national plebiscite.

In the same year, the producer Sonia Fuchs offered her a television contract to participate in soap operas of the Dramatic Area of TVN. Her debut in telenovelas was with a supporting role in Bellas y Audaces, starring Luz Jiménez and Sonia Viveros. The following year, she participated in the biographical miniseries Teresa de los Andes directed by Vicente Sabatini in the role of Juana del Solar.

=== 1990s ===
From 1990 to 2000 she actively participated in the Dramatic Area of Channel 13, standing out in ¿Te conté?, Villa Napoli, Marrón Glacé, Amor a domicilio, Fuera de control and in the series Los Carcamo.

=== 2000s ===
From 2001 to 2005 she collaborated with María Eugenia Rencoret on successful TVN soap operas, such as Amores de Mercado and Purasangre.

=== 2010s ===
In 2014 she left TVN to emigrate to Mega's Dramatic Area, where she participated in the television series Pituca sin lucas, where her character Lita Amunátegui obtained great success and recognition.

In 2017 she participated in the play Lady Marginal, directed by Claudia Di Girólamo, in tribute to the playwright Juan Radrigán.

In 2019, she debuted as a television host in the morning magazine Viva la pipol de Chilevisión.

== Awards and recognition ==
In 2018, she received a tribute from the Actors Union of Chile to her career.

In 2020 she was recognized with the title of Illustrious Daughter of the city of Valdivia.

== Filmography ==
=== Films ===
Año	Película	Personaje	Director
1983	La muñeca		Esperanza De Provens
1990	Dos mujeres en la ciudad	Hortensia	Claudio di Girólamo
1994	Johnny cien pesos	Conserje	Gustavo Graef Marino
2001	Un ladrón y su mujer	Madre de Ana	Rodrigo Sepúlveda
2002	El Leyton	Josefa	Gonzalo Justiniano
2003	B-Happy	Peta	Gonzalo Justiniano
2004	Mar adentro		Alejandro Amenábar
2006	Padre nuestro	Isabel	Rodrigo Sepúlveda
2008	A un metro de ti		Daniel Henríquez
2009	Las golondrinas de Altazor		Mauricio Álamo
2010	Que pena tu vida	Madre de Alma	Nicolás López
2013	Aftershock	Empleada de limpieza	Nicolás López
2016	Nunca vas a estar solo	Lucy	Álex Anwandter
2016	Viejos amores	Ella misma	Gloria Laso
2018	No estoy loca	Madre de Carolina	Nicolás López

=== Telenovelas ===
Año	Telenovela	Personaje	Canal
1967	Rocambole	Gabriela Loncomilla	Televisión Nacional
1988	Bellas y audaces	Celeste Riquelme	Televisión Nacional
1989	A la sombra del ángel	Emilia Torreblanca	Televisión Nacional
1990	¿Te conté?	Pola Lhorente	Canal 13
1991	Villa Nápoli	Aída Faúndez	Canal 13
1992	El palo al gato	Alicia	Canal 13
1993	Marrón Glacé	Leonor Anderson	Canal 13
1994	Champaña	Eunice García	Canal 13
1994	Top secret	Amanda Gross	Canal 13
1995	El amor está de moda	Leonor	Canal 13
1995	Amor a domicilio	Marjorie Astudillo "Madame Katmandú"	Canal 13
1996	Marrón Glacé, el regreso	Leonor Anderson	Canal 13
1997	Eclipse de luna	Carmen Vega	Canal 13
1998	Amándote	Evangelina Cisneros	Canal 13
1999	Fuera de control	Amelia Salamanca	Canal 13
2000	Sabor a ti	Purísima "Puri"	Canal 13
2001	Amores de mercado	Nora Pacheco	Televisión Nacional
2002	Purasangre	Isidora Lyon	Televisión Nacional
2003	Pecadores	Lila Corona de Flores	Televisión Nacional
2004	Destinos cruzados	Eloísa Barrera	Televisión Nacional
2005	Versus	Peonía Torrejón	Televisión Nacional
2006	Charly tango	Lorenza Salazar	Canal 13
2008	Don amor	Cecilia Ovalle	Canal 13
2009	Cuenta conmigo	Blanca Núñez	Canal 13
2010	Primera dama	Mirza Pérez	Canal 13
2011	Maldita	María Soto	Mega
2012	Pobre rico	Sonia Hundurraga	Televisión Nacional
2013	Somos los Carmona	Perpetua Loyola	Televisión Nacional
2014	Pituca sin lucas	Lidia "Lita" Amunátegui	Mega
2016	Pobre gallo	Rayén Cheuquepan	Mega
2016	Señores papis	María Elena "Nena" Larrondo	Mega
2018	Casa de muñecos	Nora Elizalde	Mega
2021	Demente	Paola Barnechea	Mega
2023	Juego de ilusiones	Margarita Lorca	Mega
2024	Al sur del corazón	Hilda Bravo	Mega

=== TV Series ===
Año	Serie	Personaje	Canal
1989	Teresa de los Andes	Juana del Solar	Televisión Nacional
1992	Estrictamente sentimental		Televisión Nacional
1996	Amor a domicilio, la comedia	Madame Katmandú	Canal 13
1998-1999	Los Cárcamo	Marilyn Bustamante	Canal 13
2000	El día menos pensado		Televisión Nacional
2008	Aída	Fresia	Televisión Nacional
2011	Prófugos	Suegra de Óscar	HBO
2011	12 días: Horror en Quilicura	Esposa de Osvaldo	Chilevisión

== Theatre ==
- La casa de Bernarda Alba (1960)
- El abanderado (1962) de Luis Alberto Heiremans
- Árbol viejo
- Goldspell
- La hija del capitán
- La danza macabra (1991) de August Strindberg
- Rey Lear (1992) de William Shakespeare
- El malentendido (1994) de Albert Camus
- Madame de Sade (1997) de Yukio Mishima
- Mina Antipersonal (2013) de Claudia Di Girolamo
- Un jardín secreto (2016) de Jorge Díaz
- Lady Marginal (2017) de Claudia Di Girolamo
- Pablo y Gabriela (2018)
- Viejas de mierda (2019) junto a Gloria Benavides y Gloria Münchmeyer
