= Augusto Schuster =

Chilean singer

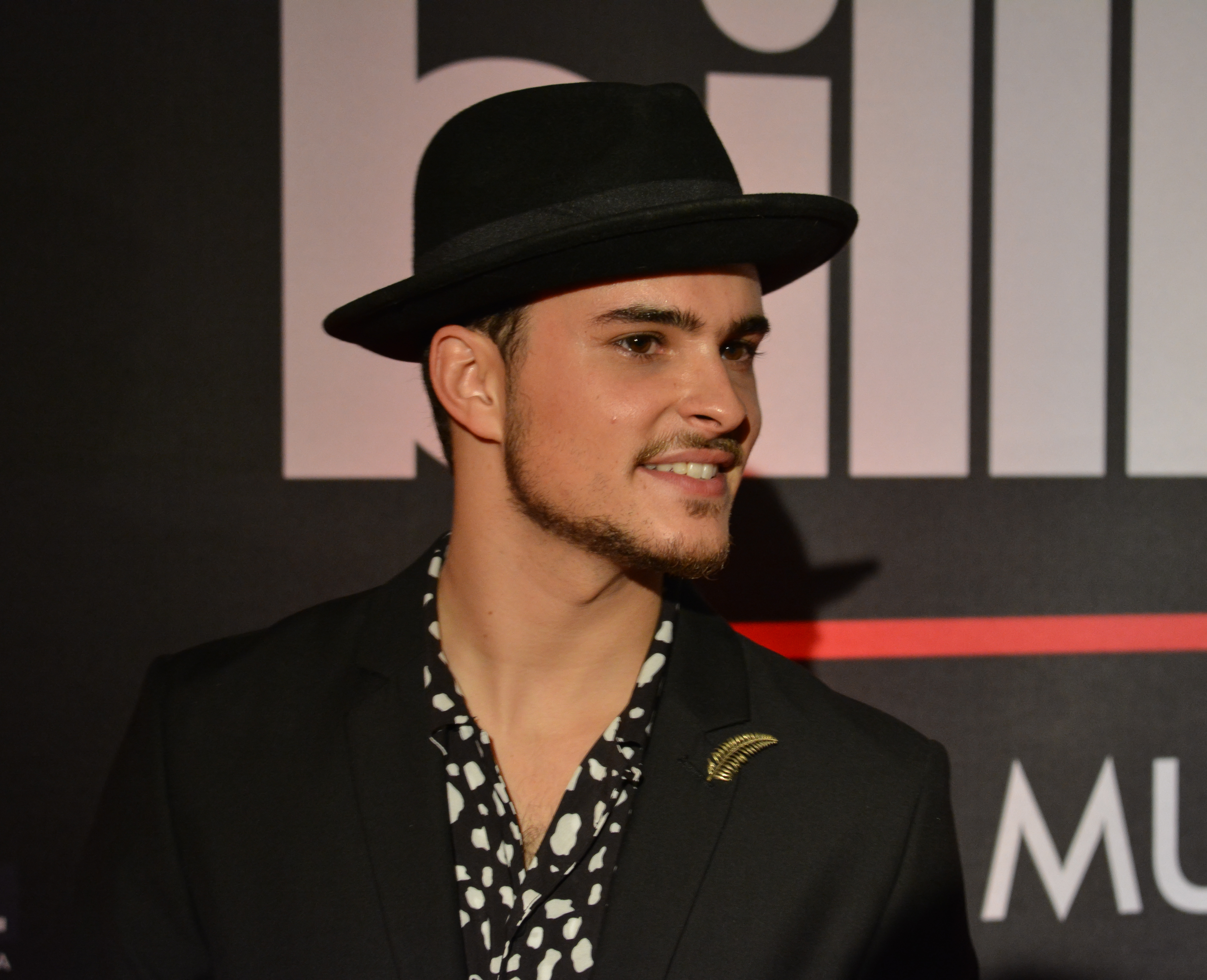
- Augusto Schuster (during Billboard Latin Music Showcase Chile, 2018)
- Born: Augusto José Schuster Picó; 24 August 1992 (age 33); Santiago de Chile, Chile
- Occupations: Actor; singer; dancer; model
- Years active: 2007–present
- Website: schusteroficial.com

Augusto José Schuster Picó or just Augusto Schuster or the mononym Schuster (born 24 August 1992, in Santiago) is a Chilean actor, singer, dancer and model.

== Filmography ==
=== Telenovelas ===
Year	Title	Role	Station
2009	Corazón rebelde	Pablo Bustamante	Canal 13
2010	Casi ángeles	Pablo "Isla Negri"	Telefe
2011	Dance! La Fuerza del Corazón	Ignacio "Nacho"	Canal 10
2014	Somos familia	Juan Ignacio Miranda	Telefe
2014	Pituca sin lucas	Fidel Gallardo	Mega
2016	Pobre gallo	Borja Pérez de Castro	Mega
2017	Tranquilo papá	Santiago Aldunate	Mega
2019	Pacto de silencio	Eduardo Vicuña	Mega
2019	Juegos de poder	Benjamín Bennet	Mega

=== TV series ===
Year	Series	Role	Station
2007–2009	Amango	Felipe García	Canal 13
2008	Química, el juego del amor	Nicolás Darwin/Nico Cooper	Canal 13
2013	Lynch	Abel	Moviecity

=== Films ===
Year	Títle	Role	Director
2010	Mandrill	Adolescente Mandrill	Ernesto Díaz Espinoza
2016	Aquí no ha pasado nada	Diego	Alejandro Fernández Almendras

== Theatre ==
Teatro
Año	Obra	Personaje	Dirección
2013	Blanca Nieves, el musical	Príncipe	Billy Bond
2015	Peter Pan, el musical	Peter Pan	Álvaro Viguera

== Discography ==
=== Albums ===
Solo

- 2017: Bonsai

=== Singles ===
- 2012: "Hello"
- 2014: "We Can Dance"
- 2015: "Llore"
- 2016: "Hasta el amanecer"
- 2017: "Me enamore"
- 2017: "¿Cómo se llama?"
- 2018: "You Love It"
- 2018: "Mi Regalo"
- 2019: "E.S.A" (with Izone)
- 2020: "Primera vez" (feat. Tommy Boysen)
- 2020: "No pasa nada"
- 2021: "Lo Repetimo (I Love Music)" (with Dr. Fifo)

featured in

- 2016: "Te Necesito" (Matt Hunter feat. Augusto Schuster)

=== Other releases ===
- 2007: Amango: El sueño se hizo realidad (from series Amango)
- 2007: Amango villancicos (from series Amango)
- 2008: Esto no es un juego (from series Amango)
- 2009: Química, el juego del amor (from series Química)
- 2009: Corazón Rebelde (from Corazón Rebelde)

== DVDs ==
- 2007: Amango karaoke
- 2008: Amango: la gira
- 2008: Amango karaoke Esto No es un Juego
- 2008: Amango en vivo
- 2010: Crz la banda karaoke (from Corazón Rebelde)

== Tours ==
- 2007–2008: Amango Gira 2008
- 2008: Soñar Despierto (for Amango)
- 2009: CRZ - La Banda (for Corazón Rebelde
