= Fernando Farías =

Chilean actor

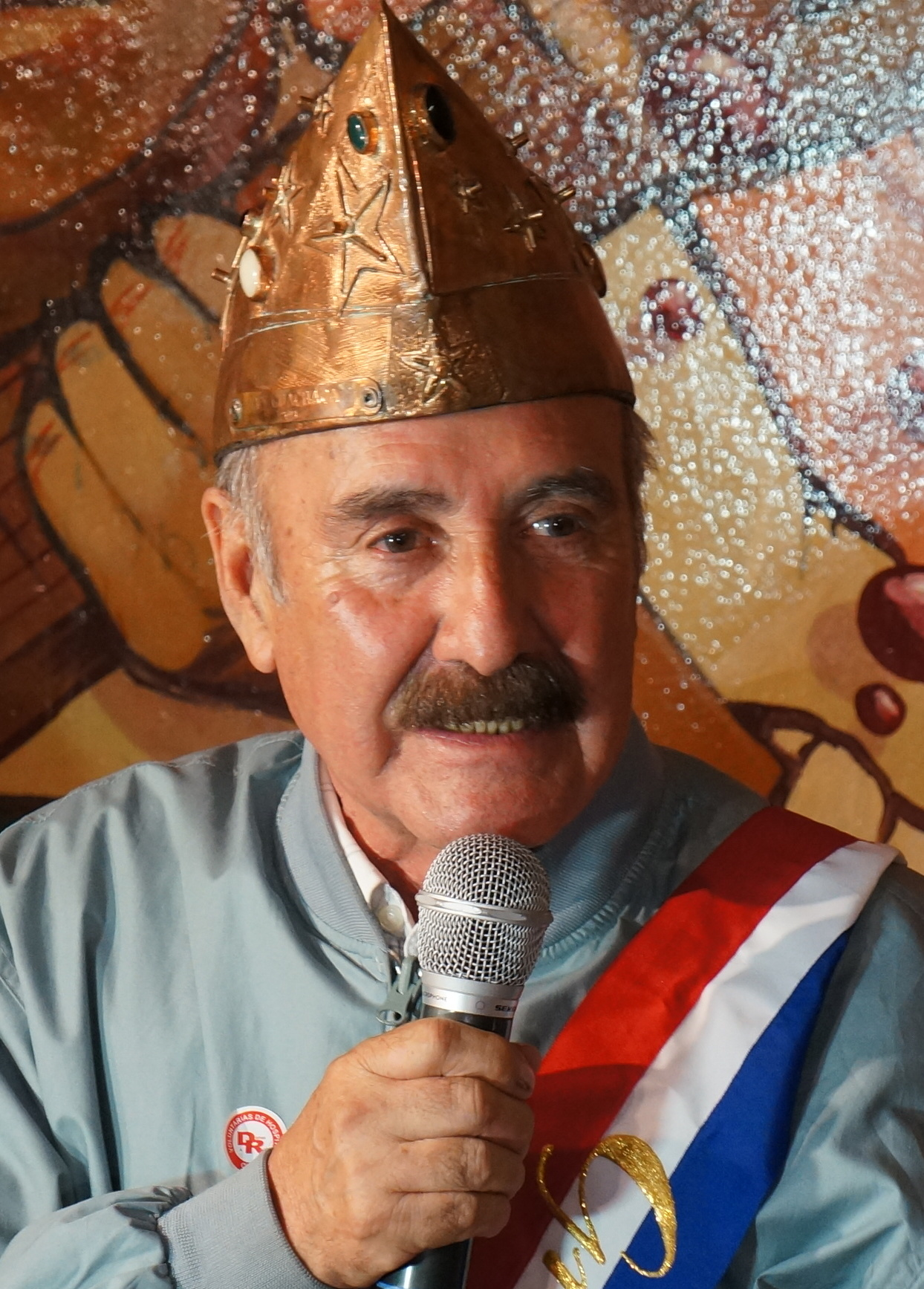
- Fernando Farías as "rey guachaca" in 2011.
- Born: Héctor Fernando Farías López; 27 July 1932 (age 94); San Antonio, Valparaíso Region, Chile
- Occupation: Actor

Héctor Fernando Farías López (born in Llolleo, San Antonio on 27 July 1932) is a Chilean actor. He is recognized mainly for his participation in TV series for many decades, including his most famous comedy characters such Señor Retamales in Los Venegas, as Don Genaro in Los 80 and as "Pelao" Saavedra in BKN among others. In 2011 he was chosen as King Guachaca by the Chilean people.

He studied at the School of Theater of the University of Concepción, TUC, a period where he also began his membership in the Communist Party. During the 1980s, and after leaving the Tejas Verdes detention and torture center, he dedicated himself to political theater.

He has a long history in cinema, participating in films such as "Cachimba" Silvio Caiozzi), "Bad Times" (Cristián Sánchez), "Round Business" (Ricardo Carrasco), "El Chacotero Sentimental" (Cristián Galaz), among others.

On television he has participated in series such as "Los 80", "Los títeres", "Semidiós", among others.

== Filmography ==
=== Film ===
- El desquite (1999)
- El chacotero sentimental (1999) como papá de Juan
- Sobre mi Sangre (2000) como Vagabundo
- Negocio redondo (2001) como Cañaco.
- Cachimba (2004) como Don Jorge.
- Promedio rojo (2004) como El abuelo.
- La gravedad del púgil (2005) como Don Arturo, el entrenador.
- Grado 3 (2009) como Armando.
- Super, todo chile adentro (2009) como Sr. Farías
- Barrio universitario (2013) como Doctor Artazar.

=== Telenovelas ===
| Year | Telenovela | Role | Channel |
|---|---|---|---|
| 1984 | La Represa | Director Hospital | TVN |
| 1984 | Los títeres | Lauro Carreño | Canal 13 |
| 1986 | Secreto de Familia | Tomás Cruces | Canal 13 |
| 1988 | Semidiós | Octavio Olguín | Canal 13 |
| 1989 | La intrusa | Abraham Castillo | Canal 13 |
| 1989 | Bravo | Serafín Coke | Canal 13 |
| 1991 | Villa Nápoli | Evaristo Céspedes | Canal 13 |
| 1992 | Fácil de amar | Clodomiro Concha | Canal 13 |
| 1993 | Ámame | Antonio Carvallo | TVN |
| 1994 | Top secret | Jaime Samoa | Canal 13 |
| 1995 | Amor a domicilio | Enrique Garrido | Canal 13 |
| 1997 | Santiago city | Gonzalo Cantillana | Mega |
| 2000 | Sabor a ti | Segundo Urrejola | Canal 13 |
| 2001 | Piel canela | Juvenal Chandía | Canal 13 |
| 2002 | Purasangre | Dámaso Aránguiz | TVN |
| 2003 | Pecadores | Caronte Tapia | TVN |
| 2004 | Hippie | Luis Pacheco | Canal 13 |
| 2008 | Hijos del Monte | Modesto Mardones | TVN |
| 2011 | Aquí mando yo | Gino Buzzoni | TVN |
| 2013 | Graduados | Amir Jalifa | Chilevisión |
| 2014 | Pituca sin lucas | Benito Saavedra | Mega |
| 2016 | Pobre gallo | Minchequeo Huaiquimil | Mega |
| 2017 | Tranquilo papá | Tito Morales | Mega |
| 2018 | Isla Paraíso | Leonel Toro | Mega |

=== Series and unitaries ===
| Year | Serie | Role | channel |
|---|---|---|---|
| 1990 | Crónica de un hombre santo | Rafael Luis Gumucio | Canal 13 |
| 1990–2000 | Los Venegas | Javier Retamales | TVN |
| 1991 | Posta Lo Matta | Dr. Norberto Pantoja | La Red |
| 1996 | Vecinos puertas adentro | Iván | Canal 13 |
| 2003 | La vida es una lotería | Don Armando | TVN |
| 2004 | Quiero si tú Quieres | Hector "Langosta" Pinto | Canal 13 |
| 2004–2012 | BKN | Demetrio "Pelao" Saavedra | Mega |
| 2005 | Mitú | Abel "Gato" Armazán | TVN |
| 2005 | Los simuladores | Various roles | Canal 13 |
| 2008–2014 | Los 80 | Don Genaro | Canal 13 |

== TV programs ==
- Pase lo que pase (1998–2002) – Invitado
- Dime por qué? (TVN, 2011) – Invitado
- El late (CHV, 2012) – Invitado
- Mi barrio, tu mejor compañía (2021)

== Publicity ==
- DFSK (2014) – Don Genaro.
- Banco BCI (2011) – Don Leo.
- San José (2012) – Abuelo.
- Crush (2012) – Tata Naranjo.
- Adiós Playas Privadas – Gobierno de Chile (2013) – Abuelo.
- Navidad Segura – Carabineros de Chile (2013) – Viejo Pascuero.
- Vuelve a clases – Carabineros de Chile (2014) – Don Fernando, el conductor.
- Woki toki – 42 frases típicas de los papás (2014) – protagonista
