= Pobre gallo =

- Genre: Telenovela
- Created by: Daniella Castagno
- Written by: Daniella Castagno; Alejandro Bruna; Paula Parra; Felipe Rojas; Raúl Gutierrez
- Directed by: Felipe Arratía; Mauricio Lucero
- Starring: Álvaro Rudolphy; Paola Volpato; Íngrid Cruz; Monserrat Ballarin; Augusto Schuster; Ignacio Garmendia
- Opening theme: "Una nueva vida" by Ivan Alejandro
- Country of origin: Chile
- Original language: Spanish
- No. of episodes: 160

Production
- Executive producers: María Eugenia Rencoret; Daniella Demichelli
- Producer: Claudia Cazenave

Original release
- Network: Mega
- Release: January 6 – August 22, 2016

Pobre gallo (English title: Imperfectly Fortunate) is a 2016 Chilean telenovela created by Daniella Castagno, that premiered on Mega on January 6, 2016 and ended on August 22, 2016. It stars Álvaro Rudolphy, Paola Volpato and Íngrid Cruz.

== Plot ==
Pobre gallo tells the story about the life of a workaholic man named Nicolas Pérez de Castro (Álvaro Rudolphy), who on the most important day of his life, falls sick on the airport floor. His diagnostic is that he needs to travel to Yerbas Buenas, with his 2 kids: Borja and Camila Pérez de Castro (Augusto Schuster and Montserrat Ballarín). In the town he meets Patricia Flores (Paola Volpato), the Major and Sub Officer of the town Yerbas Buenas of Chilean police officers. But, Carola (Íngrid Cruz) a blast from the past will stop at nothing to regain the heart of her beloved Nicolas.

== Cast ==
- Álvaro Rudolphy as Nicolás Pérez de Castro Aldunate
- Paola Volpato as Patricia Flores Flores
- Íngrid Cruz as Carola García del Río
- Jaime Vadell as Onofré Pérez de Castro
- Montserrat Ballarin as Camila Pérez de Castro Achondo
- Augusto Schuster as Borja Pérez de Castro Achondo
- Teresita Reyes as Gloria
- Mauricio Pesutic as Father Armijo
- Andrés Velasco as Eduardo Silva
- Pedro Campos as Juan Silva Flores
- Ignacio Garmendia as Francisco Silva Flores
- Mariana di Girólamo as Andrea Gonzalez Garcia
- Vicente Soto as Tomás Gonzalez García
- Francisco Puelles as Lincoyán Huaiquimil Huaiquimil
- Fernando Godoy as Railef Huaiquimil Huaiquimil
- Fernando Farías as Minchequeo Huaiquimil
- Gabriela Hernández as Rayen Huaiquimi
- Dayana Amigo as Jacqueline "Jackie" Galindo
- Otilio Castro as Esteban Galindo
- Francesca Poloni as Paula "Paulita" Silva Flores
- Steffi Méndez as Martuca Mendez

=== Guest stars ===
- Antonia Zegers as Florencia Achondo-Meyer
- Eduardo Cumar as Roberto Ossandon
- Julio César Serrano as Young windows
- José Antonio Raffo as Officer Andrade
- Romina Norambuena as Officer Morales
- Luz María Yacometti as Carola's Assistant
- Catalina Vera as Noemi

== Ratings ==
Season	Episodes	First aired		Last aired		Average
Season	Episodes	Date	Rating	Date	Rating	Average
1	160	January 6, 2016	30.1	August 22, 2016	24.3	20.6
