= Juegos de poder =

- Genre: Political thriller Police procedural
- Created by: Luis Ponce
- Written by: Luis Ponce; Lula Almeyda; Felipe Montero; Valentina Pollarolo
- Directed by: Patricio González; Javier Cabieses; Claudio López de Lérida
- Starring: Álvaro Rudolphy; Jorge Zabaleta; Simón Pesutic
- Theme music composer: Toygar Işıklı
- Ending theme: Chase and Destroy
- Composer: Max Cameron
- Country of origin: Chile
- Original language: Spanish
- No. of seasons: 1
- No. of episodes: 161

Production
- Executive producer: Daniela Demicheli
- Producer: Bruno Córdova
- Camera setup: Multi-camera
- Production company: Mega

Original release
- Network: Mega
- Release: March 11 – December 12, 2019

Juegos de poder is a Chilean telenovela created by Luis Ponce, that premiered on Mega on March 11, 2019 and ended on December 12, 2019. It stars Álvaro Rudolphy, Jorge Zabaleta and Simón Pesutic.

Filming began in December 2018 and concluded in October 2019.

== Premise ==
Prosecutor Aníbal Ramos leads the search to find the truth, and will not rest until he discovers those responsible for running over two university brothers, one of them losing his life. Meanwhile, Mariano Beltrán, a candidate running for president of Chile, will do everything in his power both for his family and for maintaining his political capital and power to prevent that truth from coming out: his son Camilo is the person in charge that prosecutor Ramos is looking for.

The series' main storyline addresses situations involving bribes, setups, multiple acts of corruption and abuse of power, including murders.

== Cast ==
=== Main ===
- Álvaro Rudolphy as Mariano Beltrán
- Jorge Zabaleta as Aníbal Ramos
- Simón Pesutic as Camilo Beltrán
- Francisca Imboden as Pilar Egaña
- Ingrid Cruz as Karen Franco
- Augusto Schuster as Benjamín Bennet
- Patricia Rivadeneira as Verónica Egaña
- Alejandra Araya as Cynthia Bravo
- Héctor Noguera as Patricio Egaña
- Claudio Arredondo as Matías Bennet
- Pedro Campos as Francisco Beltrán
- Rodrigo Soto as Gustavo Toro
- Fernanda Ramírez as Antonia Moretti
- Paula Sharim as Elena Espinoza
- Roberto Farías as Raúl Salgado
- Lorena Capetillo as Susan Morales
- Solange Lackington as Beatriz Acosta
- Juan Carlos Maldonado as Samuel Salgado
- Manuela Moreno as Florencia Beltrán
- Christian Zúñiga as Orlando Moretti
- Ingrid Isensee as Jacqueline Cifuentes
- Fernando Olivares as Jorge Mendoza
- Agustín Vidal as Iván Rodríguez
- Carlos Martínez as Hernán Matamoros
- Alondra Valenzuela as Rocío Ramos
- Diego Boggioni as Tomás Salgado
- Catalina Stuardo as Fabiola Briceño
- Muriel Martin as Romina Baeza

=== Recurring ===
- Carlos Morales as Boris Gajardo "El Mecha"
- Sergio Díaz as Eric Montoya
- Ricardo Mateluna as Héctor Cárdenas
- Mario Bustos as Agustín Beltrán
- Alejandra Pérez Vera as Mónica Silva
- Alejandro Goic as Alan Covacevich
- Eusebio Arenas as Joaquín García
- Mauricio Pitta as Danilo Pincheira
- Patricio Andrade as Eduardo Briceño
- Humberto Gallardo as Humberto Stanley/Humberto Rioseco
- Romana Satt as Vanesa
- Myriam Pérez as Gladys
- Elizabeth Torres as Johanna
- Denise Nazal as Teresa Serrano
- Slavija Agnic as Jocelyn Cortés
- Otilio Castro as Atilio Navarrete
- Óscar Hernández as Juan Guillermo Bossio
- Hugo Vásquez as León Hidalgo

== Ratings ==
Season	Episodes	First aired		Last aired	
Season	Episodes	Date	Viewers (in points)	Date	Viewers (in points)
1	161	March 11, 2019	24.5	December 12, 2019	21.3
