= Amores con trampa =

Mexican telenovela

- Genre: Telenovela
- Created by: Carlos Oporto
- Written by: David Bustos; María Antonieta Gutiérrez; Jaime Morales; Saúl Pérez
- Directed by: Salvador Garcini; César González; Javier Yerandi
- Starring: Itatí Cantoral; Eduardo Yáñez; Ernesto Laguardia; África Zavala
- Theme music composer: Joan Sebastian
- Opening theme: "La trampa" by Joan Sebastian
- Country of origin: Mexico
- Original language: Spanish
- No. of episodes: 126

Production
- Executive producer: Emilio Larrosa
- Producers: Arturo Pedraza; José Cabello
- Cinematography: Gerardo Gómez; Luis Monroy

Original release
- Network: Canal de las Estrellas
- Release: March 2 – August 23, 2015

Related
- Somos los Carmona (2013)

Amores con trampa (English title: Fooled into Love) is a Mexican telenovela produced by Emilio Larrosa for Televisa and broadcast in 2015 by Canal de las Estrellas. It is the remake of the telenovela Somos los Carmona produced in 2013. With production starting in November 2014.

Itatí Cantoral, Eduardo Yáñez, Ernesto Laguardia and África Zavala star as the protagonists, while Nora Salinas and Harry Geithner star as the antagonists.

== Synopsis ==
Amores con trampa follows the life of a rural family that moves to the capital after having sold their Ranch.

== Tribute ==
In the episode end of the soap opera, was a tribute to Mexican singer Joan Sebastian, where Maribel Guardia and Julián Figueroa performed the main theme of the soap opera "La trampa", a song that was composed by Joan Sebastian.

== Cast ==
=== Main cast ===
- Itatí Cantoral as Isabel Velasco, wife of Santiago Velasco, a beautiful and distinguished woman who has as a priority to maintain their economic level.
- Eduardo Yáñez as Facundo Carmona, a simple and humble man from the countryside. He is the husband of María Carmona, with whom he has four children he adores.
- Ernesto Laguardia as Santiago Velasco, an ambitious man whose construction company faces bankruptcy. He will do whatever it takes to get out of this situation.
- África Zavala as María Carmona, the beautiful wife of Facundo Carmona and loving mother of four.

=== Also main cast ===
- Nora Salinas as Estefany Del Real
- Ignacio López Tarso as Don Porfirio Carmona
- Luz María Aguilar as Doña Perpetua Sánchez
- Harry Geithner as Esteban Antunez
- Maribel Fernández "La Pelangocha" as Concepción "Conchita"
- José Eduardo Derbez as Felipe Velasco
- Aldo Guerra as Alberto Carmona
- Boris Duflos as Diego Briseño
- Scarlet Dergal as Rocío Velasco
- Jessica Decote as Carmen Gloria "Yoya" Carmona Sánchez
- Lore Graniewicz as Hilda de las Mercedes
- Flor Martino as Francisca Ballesteros Catalán
- Erika García as Jéssica
- Kristel Moesgen as Nicol De García
- Ceci Flores as Susana Carmona
- Rubén López "Pillín Jr" as Jacinto Carmona
- Jocelín Zuckerman as Alejandra Velasco
- Emilio Caballero as Andrés Briseño

=== Supporting cast ===
- Agustín Arana as Florencio Gallardo
- Lorena Herrera as Ángeles Sánchez

=== Guest cast ===
- Rosita Pelayo as Humilde Sánchez
- Joan Sebastian as Himself
- Lupillo Rivera as Himself
- Julián Figueroa as Himself

== Mexico broadcast ==
From March 30 to September 18, 2015 Univision broadcast Amores con trampa weeknights at 8pm/7c in the United States replacing Mi corazón es tuyo. The last episode was broadcast on September 18, 2015, with Antes muerta que Lichita replacing it on September 22, 2015.

Timeslot (ET/PT)	No. of episodes	Premiered		Ended	
Timeslot (ET/PT)	No. of episodes	Date	Premiere Ratings	Date	Finale Ratings
Monday to Friday 8:25PM	126	March 2, 2015	25.3	August 23, 2015	—N/a
