= Demente (TV series) =

2021 Chilean telenovela

- Genre: Telenovela
- Created by: Pablo Illanes
- Written by: Pablo Illanes; Josefina Fernández; Mauricio López; Simón Soto; Fernanda Lema
- Directed by: Patricio González; María Belén Arenas
- Starring: Paz Bascuñán; Benjamín Vicuña; Francisco Pérez-Bannen; Íngrid Cruz; Andrés Velasco; Patricia Rivadeneira; Gonzalo Valenzuela; Alejandra Araya; Paulo Brunetti; Lorena Capetillo
- Opening theme: "Cello Suite No.1 in G Major, BWV 1007:I.Prélude" by Johann Bach
- Country of origin: Chile
- Original language: Spanish
- No. of seasons: 1
- No. of episodes: 140

Production
- Executive producers: María Eugenia Rencoret; Patricio López; Pablo Díaz
- Producer: Verónica Brañes
- Camera setup: Multi-camera
- Production companies: Mega; DDRío Estudios

Original release
- Network: Mega
- Release: March 15 – November 23, 2021

Demente is a Chilean telenovela created by Pablo Illanes for Mega. It aired from March 15, 2021 to November 23, 2021. It stars Paz Bascuñán, Benjamín Vicuña, and Francisco Pérez-Bannen.

The series revolves around the tragedy of a family faced with a crime that will change and destroy their lives.

== Cast ==
- Paz Bascuñán as Teresa Betancourt Sarmiento
- Benjamín Vicuña as Joaquín Acevedo Soto
- Francisco Pérez-Bannen as Comisario Gonzalo Leiva
- Íngrid Cruz as Inspector Javiera Cáceres
- Andrés Velasco as Dante Covarrubias Otero / Jorge
- Patricia Rivadeneira as Flavia Betancourt Sarmiento
- Gonzalo Valenzuela as Emiliano Betancourt Sarmiento
- Alejandra Araya as Bianca Rosseti
- Paulo Brunetti as Álvaro Infante Castro
- Lorena Capetillo as Gaby Ortúzar
- Constanza Mackenna as Fernanda Cerutti
- María José Bello as Patricia Aguirre
- Rodrigo Soto as Oscar Saldaña
- Fernanda Ramirez as Maira Sánchez
- Victoria de Gregorio as Miranda Covarrubias Betancourt
- Paulina Moreno as Melissa Rodríguez Ulloa / Caro
- Manuel Castro Volpato as Pascal Mackenna
- Alondra Valenzuela as Laura Acevedo Betancourt
- Rafael García-Huidobro as Mateo Acevedo Betancourt / Nachito
- Hellen Mrugalski as María José "Coty" Betancourt Rosseti
- Aída Caballero as Viviana "Vivi" Betancourt Rosseti
- Josefa Espinoza as Ana María Leiva Aguirre
- Ágatha del Valle as Sofía Leiva Aguirre

== Ratings ==
Season	Episodes	First aired		Last aired	
Season	Episodes	Date	Rating (in points)	Date	Rating (in points)
1	140	March 15, 2021	11.3	November 23, 2021	21.7
