= Mauricio Pesutic =

Chilean actor (born 1948)

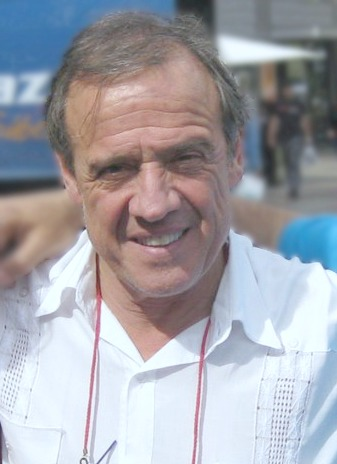
- Born: Mauricio Santiago Pešutić Pérez; May 3, 1948 (age 77); Punta Arenas, Chile
- Occupation: Actor

Mauricio Santiago Pešutić Pérez (born May 3, 1948) is a Chilean actor with a long career on TV soap operas, film and theatre. He studied Drama and Film Direction at the Catholic University of Chile. He also wrote and directed 3 short films in the 1970s. He has performed a wide range of roles but stands out as the villain. In 2001 he was awarded best supporting actor at the APES awards, and in 2002 he won the Altazor prize for best TV actor.

== Soap operas ==
- Los títeres 1984 as Néstor, Transmitted by Canal 13
- La Última Cruz 1987 as Ramiro, Transmitted by Canal 13
- Semidiós 1988 as Alberto, Transmitted by Canal 13.
- Villa Napoli 1991 as Sebastián, Transmitted by Canal 13
- Trampas y caretas 1992 as Vittorio, transmitada por TVN
- Jaque Mate 1993 as Rodolfo Moller, Transmitted by TVN.
- Rompecorazón 1994 as Baltazar Plaza, Transmitted by TVN.
- Estúpido Cupido 1995 as Padre Benítez, Transmitted by TVN
- Juegos de Fuego1995 as Leandro Serrano, Transmitted by TVN
- Sucupira, 1996, as Renato Montenegro, Transmitted by TVN
- Loca piel 1996, as Hernán Cañas, Transmitted by TVN
- Tic Tac, 1997, as Ángel Mendizabal/Ángela Smith, Transmitted by TVN
- Borrón y Cuenta Nueva, 1998 as Gregorio Urrutia, Transmitted by TVN
- La Fiera, 1999, as Rebolledo, Transmitted by TVN
- Aquelarre 1999 as Prudencio, Transmitted by TVN.
- Santoladrón, 2000, as Tiberio Carpio, Transmitted by TVN.
- Amores de Mercado 2001, as Chingao Solís, Transmitted by TVN
- Purasangre 2002 as Recaredo Oyarzún; Transmitted by TVN.
- Pecadores, 2003, as Rigoletto Morandé, Transmitted by TVN
- Destinos Cruzados, 2004, as Carloto Esquella, Transmitted by TVN
- Versus 2005 as Bartolome Chaparro, Transmitted by TVN.
- Cómplices, 2006, as Gonzalo Mardones, Transmitted by TVN
- Floribella, 2006, as Antonio, Transmitted by TVN
- Corazón de María, 2007, as Sansón, Transmitted by TVN.
- Amor por Accidente 2007 as Dussan Marinovic, Transmitted by TVN.
- Viuda Alegre, 2008, as Sandro Zapata, Transmitted by TVN.
- ¿Dónde está Elisa?, 2009, as Prefecto Néstor Salazar, Transmitted by TVN.
- Martín Rivas, 2010, as Dámaso Encina, Transmitted by TVN.
- El Laberinto de Alicia, 2011, as Vladimir Navarenko, Transmitted by TVN.
- Su Nombre es Joaquín, 2011, as Dionisio Silva, Transmitted by TVN.
- Pobre Rico, 2012 as Juan Carlos Pérez, Transmitted by TVN.
- Socias, 2013 as Ricardo Ossandón, Transmitted by TVN.
- Pituca sin lucas, 2014 as José Antonio Risopatrón, Transmitted by Mega.
- Pobre Gallo, 2016 as Padre Almiro Armijo, Transmitted by Mega.

== Films ==
- Coronation (2000) as Don Ramón
- Rojo, la película (2006)
- Mirageman (2007) as Juan Moli
- Mansacue (2008) as Sergio
- Prison in the Andes (2023) as Marcelo Moren Brito
