= Julio Videla =

Chilean television personality (1944–2020)

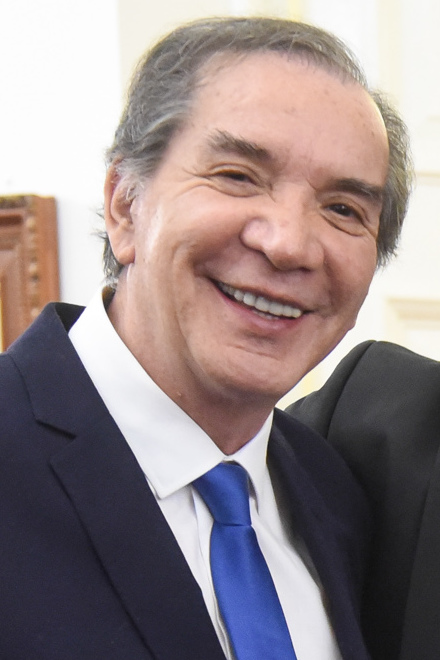
- Videla in 2017
- Born: Julio Sergio Videla Cabeza; 15 January 1944 (age 81); Valparaíso, Chile
- Occupation: Radio & TV host
- Years active: 1968–2020
- Children: Julio Adrián Videla; Sandra Videla

Julio Sergio Videla Cabezas (Valparaíso, 15 January 1944 – Viña del Mar, 13 November 2020) was a Chilean radio host and television personality. Videla began his rise to Latin American fame in 1973, when he was the last person to broadcast on Radio Magallanes before the coup.

== Biography ==
He studied his primary education at Liceo 14 (today Liceo Polivalente Juan Gómez Millas) in El Bosque, in Santiago.

=== Radio career ===
In 1968, he made his debut working as an announcer on Radio Carrera. The following year he moved to Radio Corporación, which is where he was as the 1973 military coup occurred. Later he worked at Radio Balmaceda (1973-1975) and Radio Portales de Santiago, where he conducted Portaleando la Mañana between 1976 and May 1988.

He worked for Radio Portales, Radio Gigante (June 1988-September 1989), Radio Monumental (October 1989-December 1991), Radio Chilena (February 1992-May 1999), Radio Romance (July 1999), Radio Para Ti (August 1999-December 2006) and Radio Cooperativa (July 2008-January 2019), where he hosted Tus años cuentan.

=== Television career ===
His television debut was hosted on Channel 13, where he participated as a co-host in the Student Championship (1973-1974) and as a presenter in El tribunal de la risa (1979). He was one of the faces that participated in the first Chilean Teletón, which was held in 1978.

Later, he worked at Canal 11, where he hosted the Cordialmente broadcast at noon between 1988 and 1991. The novelty of the program came from putting viewers on the air through telephone calls, which was a "permanent resource for Videla".

Later on, he emigrated to Megavisión, where he was the host of programs such as Acompáñeme (1992-1995) —which followed the format and schedule of Cordialmente—, Juntemonos con Julio (1996-1998), and the satellite program Acompáñeme al Festival (1994-1996, 1998-1999), which as a part of the Viña del Mar International Song Festival.

After a brief stint at UCV Televisión (2000-2001), where he hosted Ruta 68 along with Vanessa Reiss, he returned to Canal 13, where he hosted Con ustedes (2002-2004). After that, he had sporadic appearances on television whilst staying in the radio business.

== Death ==
Videla died on 13 November 2020. The cause was a heart attack while using a sauna room in his department in Viña del Mar, which also resulted in second-degree burns, due to the steam from the sauna.
