= Reserva de familia =

Chilean telenovela

- Genre: Family thriller
- Created by: Pablo Illanes (Adapted)
- Developed by: María Eugenia Rencoret; Patricio González K. Felipe Marchetti
- Starring: Nelson Villagra; Francisco Melo; Paola Volpato; Marcelo Alonso; Ingrid Cruz; Diego Muñoz; Luz Valdivieso
- Country of origin: Chile
- No. of seasons: 1
- No. of episodes: 123

Production
- Executive producers: Patricio López V. Mauricio Campos
- Production locations: Santiago, Chile
- Running time: Approx. 30 minutes

Original release
- Network: TVN
- Release: March 19 – October 22, 2012

Related
- Gran Reserva (2010–13); Caminos de Guanajuato

Reserva de Familia (Reserve of Family) is a Chilean telenovela produced by TVN. It is an adaptation of the Spanish series Gran Reserva by Pablo Illanes and directed by Maria Eugenia Rencoret.

== Plot ==
A family story revolves around two families of winemakers: The Ruiz-Tagle, represented by their patriarch Mr. Fernando (Nelson Villagra) and four children: Miguel (Francisco Melo), Pedro (Marcelo Alonso), Emma (Ingrid Cruz) and Raul (Diego Muñoz) who consider wine as a lucrative business, a family winery that bears more than a century as part of the history and winemaking tradition. After a careful process of making and aging are born Treasury Ruiz-Tagle, strong and balanced wines.

The Rivera, after the death of Federico (Luis Alarcón) are headed by Mrs. Sofia (Consuelo Holzapfel) and their two children: Lucía (Luz Valdivieso) and Daniel (Pablo Cerda), who believe that the vineyard and land area of life. Despite the differences, both families live in a balance that breaks dramatically when someone tries to kill Miguel, the eldest of the Ruiz-Tagle.

It all starts after a failed assassination attempt, the manager of the wineries Ruiz-Tagle is amnesiac, back home trying to recover his memory, his life and discover who tried to kill him. Betrayed and without memory, he can not trust anyone not even his nearest and dearest relatives, including his wife Paula (Paola Volpato), his family Gustavo (Andres Velasco) and Sara (Ignacia Baeza), and Monica (Patricia López), the ambitious family lawyer.

Everyone is a suspect and detective Jacqueline (Ximena Rivas) is committed to finding the person responsible for the failed assassination.

== Cast ==
=== Main cast ===
- Nelson Villagra as Fernando Ruiz-Tagle Mackenna.
- Francisco Melo as Miguel Ruiz-Tagle Solar .
- Paola Volpato as Paula Risopatrón.
- Marcelo Alonso as Pedro Ruiz-Tagle Solar.
- Ingrid Cruz as Emma Ruiz-Tagle Solar.
- Diego Muñoz as Raul Ruiz-Tagle Solar .
- Luz Valdivieso as Lucia Rivera Guzmán .
- Andrés Velasco as Gustavo Gonzalez.
- Ignacia Baeza as Sara García López.
- Pablo Cerda as Daniel Rivera Guzmán .
- Patricia López as Mónica Robles.
- Ximena Rivas as Jacqueline Ortega.
- Consuelo Holzapfel as Sofía Guzmán.
- Gabriela Medina as Tina Sánchez.
- César Arredondo as Natalio Contreras.
- Catalina Aguayo as Paloma Olmedo / Antonia.
- Florencia Martínez as Claudia Ruiz-Tagle Risopatrón.

=== Special participation ===
- Gloria Münchmeyer as Estela Solar De Arce .
- Luis Alarcón as Federico Rivera.

=== Supporting cast ===
- Patricio Achurra as Agustín Correa.
- Silvia Santelices as Amelia of Correa.
- Alex Zisis as Diego Calvo.
- Elvira Cristi as Pascal Correa.
- Nicolás Brown as Gonzalo Rodríguez.
- César Caillet as Adrián Fernández.
- Ivana Llanos as Lorena Paris.
- Fernando Olivares as David Toledo.
- Pedro Vicuña as Iván Serrano.
- Pablo Striano as Julio Medina.
- Sergio Silva as Gustavo's friend.
