= Loca piel =

- Directed by: María Eugenia Rencoret
- Starring: Bastián Bodenhöfer; Javiera Contador; Álvaro Escobar; Ana María Gazmuri; Jael Unger; Jaime Vadell; Mauricio Pesutic; Sonia Viveros; Alejandra Fosalba; Tamara Acosta
- Opening theme: Loca piel by Ryo
- Country of origin: Chile
- Original language: Spanish
- No. of episodes: 83

Production
- Running time: 60 minutes

Original release
- Network: TVN
- Release: 12 August – 21 December 1996

Related
- Sucupira; Oro Verde

Loca piel (English: Crazy Skin) is a 1996 Chilean telenovela produced and broadcast by TVN.

== Cast ==
- Bastián Bodenhöfer as Guillermo Carter.
- Javiera Contador as Verónica Alfaro.
- Álvaro Escobar as Martín Page.
- Ana María Gazmuri as Paula Green.
- Jael Ünger as Pilar Lynch.
- Jaime Vadell as Gerardo Page.
- Sonia Viveros as Trinidad Yávar.
- Eduardo Barril as Eladio Alfaro.
- Consuelo Holzapfel as Gisela Bonfante.
- Mauricio Pesutic as Hernán Cañas.
- Alejandra Fosalba as Manuela Phillips.
- Tamara Acosta as Danitza Torres / Lorena Torres.
- Renato Münster as Emilio Duval.
- Paola Volpato as María Olivia Carter.
- Silvia Santelices as Irene Claro.
- Rodolfo Bravo as Robinson Torres.
- Patricia Guzmán as Úrsula de Torres.
- Schlomit Baytelman as Diana Balbontín.
- Patricio Strahovsky as Álvaro Renán.
- Patricia Rivadeneira as Estela Benque.
- Rodrigo Bastidas as Jaime Benavente.
- Rosita Nicolet as Vilma Zevallos.
- Solange Lackington as Genoveva Flores.
- Luz Jiménez as Bernarda.
- Tito Bustamante as Domingo.
- Yuyuniz Navas as Alejandra Foster.
- Francisco Pérez-Bannen as Vicente Cruz.
- Monica Godoy as Javiera Renán.
- Paulo Meza as Alexis Torres.
- Pamela Villalba as Yolanda.
- Nicolás Fontaine as Gabriel Renán.
- Gloria Canales as Glorita.
- Josefina Velasco as Rita.
- Gabriel Prieto as Rolando "Rolo".
- Nicolás Huneeus as Dante.
- Karin Wilkomirsky as María Flores "Mary Flowers".
- Christián González as Miguel Ángel.
- Sebastián Arrau as Antonio Blanco.
- Jorge Hevia Jr. as Rodrigo Carter.
- Camila Guzmán as María Ignacia Renán.

=== Special participations ===
- Juan Bennett as Renato Green.
- Humberto Gallardo as Profesor Poblete.
- Victoria Gazmuri as María José.
- Catalina Olcay as Soraya.
- Óscar Hernández as Capitán de Bomberos.
- Jorge Zabaleta as Cajero bancario.
- Carolina Cuturrufo
- Jeanette Espinoza
- Paola Gambino

== Soundtrack ==
Volume 1

1. Ryo - Loca Piel
2. Alberto Plaza - Bandido (Tema de Martín)
3. Luz Casal - Entre Mis Recuerdos (Tema de Trinidad y Gerardo)
4. Gémini - Calor (Tema de Manuela)
5. Los Chulos - Eres Más (Tema de Danitza y Dante)
6. Egóticos - Estamos Bien (Tema de Verónica)
7. Biagio Antonaccia & Sergio Dalma - No Sé A Quien Debo Creer (Tema de Álvaro)
8. Antonella Arancio - Recuerdos Del Alma (Tema de Paula)
9. Buddy Richard - Si Una Vez (Tema de Úrsula)
10. Myriam Hernández & Paul Anka - Tu Cabeza En Mi Hombro (Tema de Gerardo y Pilar)
11. Marcos Llunas - Vida (Tema de Alejandra y Hernán)
12. Andrea Tessa - Como Pez En El Agua (Tema de Yolanda)
13. Pablo Dagnino - Dejo Las llaves (Tema de Gabriel)
14. Zucchero - El Vuelo (Tema de Guillermo)
15. Ricky Martin - Te Extraño, Te Olvido, Te Amo (Tema de Javiera y Vicente)
16. Luis Eduardo Aute - Alevosía
17. Aleste - Mundo Salvaje
18. Millie - Por Primera Vez
19. Mal Corazón - Eternos Días de Invierno
20. Los de más Abajo - La Colita
21. Paradisio - Bailando
22. Me & My - Dub I Dub (Tema de María)
23. Ana Cirré - El cielo del Tibet (Tema de amor de Verónica)
24. Sandy & Papo - Mueve, Mueve (Tema de Danitza)

Volume 2

1. Illya Kuryaki & The Valderramas - Abarajame
2. Zimbabwe - Paseo Nocturno
3. Lucybell - Cuando Respiro tu Boca
4. Pánico - Demasiada Confusión
5. Panteras Negras - Pitta 2 (Cuidado con el Punga)
6. La Pozze Latina - La Subida
7. Lord Bayron - Cofra
8. Jovanotti - Ragazzo Fortunato
9. La Dolce Vitta - Amor a la Mala
10. Los Vándalos - Tonight
11. La Portuaria - Supermambo
12. Chancho En Piedra - Guach Perry
13. Anachena - Soft

Volume 3 PURE ROCK BALLADS

1. Bon Jovi - Always
2. Joan Osborne - One Of Us
3. U2 - I Still Haven't Found What I'm Looking For
4. The Cranberries - Ode To My Family
5. Sheryl Crow - Run Baby Run
6. INXS - Never Tear Us Apart
7. Paul Weller - You Do Something To Me
8. The Who - Behind Blue Eyes
9. Elton John - Believe
10. Zucchero Feat. Paul Young - Senza Una Donna
11. Eric Clapton - Wonderful Tonight
12. J.J. Cale - After Midnight
13. Faith No More - Easy
14. Del Amitri - Driving With The Brakes On
15. Texas - So In Love With You
16. Extreme - More Than Words
17. Ugly Kid Joe - Cats In The Cradle
18. Scorpions - Wind Of Change
