= Patricia Rivadeneira =

Chilean actor

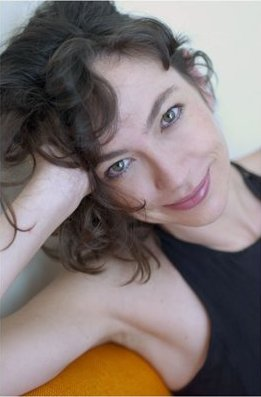
- Born: Patricia Rivadeneira Ruiz-Tagle; August 6, 1964 (age 62); Santiago de Chile
- Education: University of Chile
- Occupation: Actress
- Years active: 1985–present

Patricia Rivadeneira Ruiz-Tagle (Santiago, August 6, 1964) is an actress and a cultural manager from Chile. She was Chilean Cultural Attaché in Italy appointed by the government of Ricardo Lagos Escobar, a job she carried out between 2001 and 2006. Between 2007 and 2011, the actress served as Executive Secretary of the Instituto Italo – Latino Americano (IILA). For her contribution to culture, she was decorated by the Italian Government with the Order of the Star of Italy. She is considered a muse of the avant-garde in Chile.

In the 1990s she stood out on TVN with her characters in telenovelas such as Trampas y caretas, Sucupira and Aquelarre. She then she returned after 15 years, and she belongs to the Dramatic Area of Mega where she shines in the late-night soap operas.

== Filmography ==
=== Films ===
Film
Year	Film	Character
1985	Cortázar, Capital Rayuela	
1988	Sussi	Daisy
1988	The Lawless Land	Snake Woman
1990	Caluga o menta	Manuela, la Loca
1991	La telenovela errante	
1996	Bienvenida Casandra	Mamá de Casandra
1996	Takilleitor	Fan 1
1998	Cinco marinos y un ataúd verde	Armenia
1998	Aventureros del fin del mundo	Aventurera
1999	La chica del Crillón	Julia Rubilar
1999	The Sentimental Teaser	Alicia
2005	Monógamo sucesivo	
2009	Pinochet boys	Julia Madrid
2013	Il Futuro	
2014	Allende	
2014	La voz en off	Lucy
2014	Aurora	Berta
2020	La Verónica	Andrea

=== Telenovela ===
Year	Telenovela	Character
1986	Secreto de familia	Soledad Barca Garagaytía
1989	La intrusa	Carolina Inostroza
1990	Acércate más	Sully
1992	Trampas y caretas	Ana Rosa Astudillo / Roxana Ross
1993	Jaque mate	María del Rosario "Chery"
1993	Ámame	Macarena Oyarzún
1994	Rompecorazón	Haydée Carrera
1995	Estúpido Cupido	Gloria Manterola
1996	Sucupira	Regina Lineros
1996	Loca piel	Estela Behnke
1998	Borrón y cuenta nueva	Alejandra Bryce
1999	La fiera	Marta Montt
1999	Aquelarre	Rodolfa Patiño
2000	Santo ladrón	Lorena Cortés
2014	Vuelve temprano	Maite Soler
2015	La Poseída	Ernestina Riesco
2017–2018	Perdona nuestros pecados	Estela Undurraga
2019	Juegos de poder	Verónica Egaña
2021	Demente	Flavia Betancourt

=== TV Series ===
Year	Series	Character
1990	Corín Tellado	Ángela
1993	Carlos Carola	
1996	La Buhardilla	Francisca Lira
1997	Brigada Escorpión	Isabel Bassi
1998–1999	Sucupira, la comedia	Regina Lineros
2019	Los Espookys	

=== Theater ===
Plays

- Réplica (2018) de Isidora Stevenson
- Xuárez (2015) de Luis Barrales
- Allende, noche de septiembre (2013) de Luis Barrales
- La contadora de películas (2013–2014) de Donatello Salamina.
- Un’Altra Fame (2007) de Diego Muñoz y Michela Andreozzi
- Déjala sangrar (2006) de Benjamín Galemiri
- Intendevo dire (2005) de Craig Lucas
- Neruda, 100 años, recital poético (2004) con el Grupo Chiloé y Alessandro Haber
- Aprenderás de nuevo a ser estrella (2004) recital poético con Leo Gulotta
- Recital Poético, Neruda (2004) con Mariano Rigillo, Festival de Ravello
- EI Amor Intelectual (1999) de Benjamín Galemiri
- Cielo falso (1998) de Benjamín Galemiri.
- Poeta en Nueva York (1998) performance, homenaje a García Lorca
- EI Seductor (1997) de Benjamín Galemiri
- Un dulce aire canalla (1995) de Benjamín Galemiri
- El Solitario (1994) de Benjamín Galemiri
- EI Coordinador (1993) de Benjamín Galemiri
- Chilena Dignidad (1993) performance
- Drácula (1992)
- Performance Museo de Bellas Artes de Santiago (1992)
- Antígona (1991) espectáculo multimedia con la participación del grupo de rock Los Prisioneros
- Teorema (1987) performance
- Cleopatras (1987–1990) espectáculo multimedial
