= Pituca sin lucas =

- Created by: Rodrigo Bastidas; Elena Muñoz
- Written by: Rodrigo Bastidas; Elena Muñoz; Alejandra Saavedra; Hugo Castillo; Milena Bastidas
- Directed by: Patricio González; Pablo Aedo
- Starring: Paola Volpato; Álvaro Rudolphy; Íngrid Cruz; Mauricio Pesutic; Augusto Schuster; Mariana di Girolamo; Fernando Godoy
- Opening theme: "Cuando Nos Volvamos a Encontrar" by Carlos Vives
- Country of origin: Chile
- Original language: Spanish
- No. of seasons: 1
- No. of episodes: 153

Production
- Executive producer: Patricio López
- Camera setup: Multi-camera
- Production company: Mega

Original release
- Network: Mega
- Release: October 13, 2014 – May 25, 2015

Related
- Silvana sin lana; Pituca sin lucas (Peruvian TV series)

Pituca sin lucas (English title: Fancy Woman Without Money) is a Chilean romantic comedy television show created by Rodrigo Bastidas and Elena Muñoz, that premiered on Mega on October 13, 2014 and ended on May 25, 2015. Starring Paola Volpato and Alvaro Rudolphy, and directed by Patricio Gonzalez, Pablo Aedo, Felipe Arratia, and Mauricio Lucero, Pituca sin lucas was filmed by Chilefilms studios.

Pituca sin lucas is about a wealthy woman who, after being abandoned by her husband, must adjust to a new economic reality. She decides to live in a middle-class neighborhood where she finds love and emotional stability with a widower that works on a fish and seafood market. The story is set between La Dehesa in Lo Barnechea, one of the highest income neighborhoods of the Santiago Metropolitan Region, and Maipú, a middle class commune of the same region.

== Plot ==
The fall of Tichi Risopatrón has been brutal. Thunderous. Especially because this woman has never worked for anyone, nor is she a homemaker: she does not know how to cook, has never used a microwave and lives isolated from what happens in the real world. But her new status as a working and courageous woman helps her to become a new Tichi, one she never even knew existed: a strong woman that is able to support her family and do the unimaginable to provide for her young daughters. In fact, she doesn’t even have problems moving from her super mansion in La Dehesa to a semi-detached house in a middle-class neighborhood.

Can Tichi adapt to her new status, learn to work and avoid falling for her new neighbor, who attracts her so passionately? Can they give in to this budding love they are feeling? They can try to avoid fate, but nothing will change the destiny of these two clandestine lovers.

== Cast ==
- Paola Volpato as María Teresa "Tichi, the Centolla" Achondo Amunategui de Risopatron
- Álvaro Rudolphy as Manuel Gallardo Salinas
- Íngrid Cruz as Stella "Reineta" González González / María Estela González "Peineta"
- Mauricio Pesutic as José Antonio Risopatrón
- Augusto Schuster as Fidel Gallardo Bastidas
- Mariana di Girolamo as María Belén Risopatrón Achondo
- Montserrat Ballarin as María Jesús Risopatrón Achondo
- Francisco Puelles as Salvador Gallardo Bastidas
- Fernanda Ramírez as Gladys Gallardo Bastidas
- Ignacio Garmendia as Felipe Aldunate Correa
- Fernando Godoy as Gregorio "Goyo" Cereceda
- Otilio Castro as Enrique "Enrie-André" Andrade Chavez
- Gabriela Hernández as Lita Amunátegui de Achondo
- María de los Ángeles García as Margarita Bravo Saavedra
- Fernando Farías as Benito Saavedra Aranguiz
- Claudio Olate as Miguel Saez Pérez
- Sofía Bennet as María Piedad "Pitita" Risopatrón Achondo
- Benjamín Muñoz as Ernesto "Chechico" Gallardo Bastidas
- Paulina Eguiluz as Margarita's Mother
- Hernán Lacalle as Lawyer of Risopatron Family

== Reception ==
It was considered the most watched Chilean telenovela since 2006, reaching an average audience rating of 25.3 points and over 50% of the total share of Chilean television. It was considered an unprecedented success for Mega in the genre of fiction (usually dominated by Canal 13 and TVN).

=== Ratings ===
Season	Episodes	First aired		Last aired		Average
Season	Episodes	Date	Rating	Date	Rating	Average
1	153	October 13, 2014	33.5	May 25, 2015	34.6	25.3
