= Álvaro Rudolphy =

Chilean actor

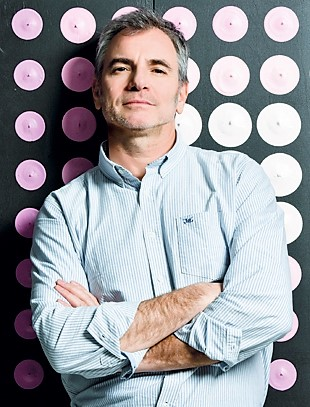
- Rudolphy in 2016
- Born: Álvaro Gonzalo Rudolphy Fontaine; May 24, 1964; Viña del Mar, Chile
- Occupation: Actor

Álvaro Gonzalo Rudolphy Fontaine (born May 24, 1964, in Viña del Mar, Chile) is a Chilean actor who works in theater, soap operas and film. He has obtained numerous awards, among them the Apes Prize in 2001 to the best Actor in his role in Amores de mercado and the Altazor Prize in 2008 for his role in Alguien te mira.

He was raised in Concepción, where he studied at Alianza Francesa. When his parents divorced, he returned to his birth city along with his mother and two siblings.

After a year studying French, and another one of Engineering at the Pontifical Catholic University of Valparaíso, he finally opted for theater.

He studied theater in the academy by Gustavo Meza. He worked for Canal 13 and later on TVN. In the majority of his roles he has been the main character or one of the principal characters of the plot.

He made his debut in Matilde Dedos Verdes, in Canal 13.

His first main role was in Estúpido Cupido from TVN, where he played Aníbal Donoso who fell in love with the main character Mónica Tagle, played by Carolina Fadic.

His great performance in the soap opera Amores de mercado with the lead role of twins Pelluco and Rodolfo.

He also appeared in Alguien te mira, portraying a psychopath killer. And his most recent role is the vampire "Domingo Vrolok" in the nocturnal soap opera named Conde Vrolok.

His best friend is fellow actress Sigrid Alegría.

On November 15, 2008, he married the journalist Catalina Comandari at a beach resort in Horcón.

== Films ==
Films
Year	Film	Character	Notes
2000	Tierra del Fuego		
2003	Sexo con Amor	Álvaro	
2008	Chile Puede	Javier	

== Telenovelas ==
Soap Operas
Year	Soap Opera	Character	Director
1988	Matilde Dedos Verdes	Mauricio Echaurren	Cristián Mason
1989	Bravo	Mauricio Gonzalez	Alejandro Rojas
1990	Acércate Más	Rodrigo Montero	Ricardo Vicuña
1991	Ellas por Ellas	Leonardo Luco	Ricardo Vicuña
1992	El Palo al Gato	Aníbal Bustamante	Oscar Rodríguez G.
1993	Marrón Glacé	Kostia Karalakis	Oscar Rodríguez G.
1994	Champaña	Juan José Sanfuentes	Cristián Mason
1995	Estúpido Cupido	Aníbal Donoso	Vicente Sabatini
1996	Sucupira	Rafael Aliaga	Vicente Sabatini
1997	Oro Verde	Cristóbal Ossandón	Vicente Sabatini
1998	Borrón y Cuenta Nueva	Rubén Salgado	Leonardo Rojas
1999	Aquelarre	Juan Pablo Huidobro	María E. Rencoret
2000	Santo Ladrón	Adrián Villegas	María E. Rencoret
2001	Amores de Mercado	Pedro "Pelluco" Solís / Rodolfo Ruttenmeier	María E. Rencoret
2002	Purasangre	Miguel Callasis	María E. Rencoret
2003	Pecadores	Simón Valladares	María E. Rencoret
2004	Destinos Cruzados	Daniel Riquelme	María E. Rencoret
2007	Alguien te Mira	Julián García	Germán Barriga
2008	El señor de La Querencia	Manuel Pradenas	Germán Barriga
2009	¿Dónde está Elisa?	Camilo Rivas	Rodrigo Velásquez
2009-2010	Conde Vrolok	Domingo Vrolok	Victor Huerta
2010	La Familia de al Lado	Gonzalo Ibañez	Victor Huerta
2011	Su Nombre es Joaquín	Joaquín Arellano	Victor Huerta
2012	Separados	Jaime Mathews	Italo Galleani
2013	Somos Los Carmona	Facundo Carmona	Claudio Lopez de L.
2014	Pituca Sin Lucas	Manuel Gallardo	Patricio Gonzalez
2016	Pobre Gallo	Nicolás Perez de Castro	Nicolas Alemparte
2017-2018	Perdona Nuestros Pecados	Armando Quiroga	Nicolas Alemparte
2019	Juegos de Poder	Mariano Beltrán	Patricio Gonzalez
2024	Secretos de Familia	Martín Fernández	Roberto Rebolledo
