= Somos los Carmona =

- Created by: Carlos Oporto
- Written by: Carlos Oporto; David Bustos; Jaime Morales
- Directed by: Claudio López de Lérida
- Starring: Álvaro Rudolphy; Carolina Arregui; Fernando Larraín; Ingrid Cruz; Magdalena Müller; Francisco Pueles; Valentina Carvajal; Ignacio Susperreguy; María de los Ángeles García; Hernán Lacalle
- Opening theme: Somos Los Carmona by Álvaro Rudolphy
- Country of origin: Chile
- Original language: Spanish
- No. of episodes: 151

Production
- Executive producer: Daniela Demicheli
- Producers: Cecilia Aguirre; Bruno Córdoba
- Production location: Santiago
- Running time: 45 minutes

Original release
- Network: TVN
- Release: August 19, 2013 – March 24, 2014

Related
- Amores con trampa

Somos Los Carmona is a Chilean telenovela originally broadcast on TVN.

== Cast ==
- Álvaro Rudolphy as Facundo Carmona
- Carolina Arregui as Rosa Leiva Loyola
- Fernando Larraín as Roberto Velasco
- Ingrid Cruz as Isabel Durán
- Luis Alarcón as Rosendo Carmona
- Gabriela Hernández as Perpetua Loyola
- Magdalena Müller as Carmen "Yoyita" Carmona Leiva
- Francisco Puelles as Alberto "Piduco" Carmona Leiva
- María de los Ángeles García as Francisca Catalán
- Ignacio Susperreguy as Felipe Velasco Durán
- Valentina Carvajal as Rocío Velasco Durán
- Matías Gil as Diego Briceño
- Gabriela Medina as Humilde Loyola
- Víctor Montero as Esteban Poblete
- Andrea Eltit as Alejandra Sanhueza
- Agustina Lavín as Susana Carmona Leiva
- Diego García as Jacinto Carmona Leiva
- Isidora Artigas as Ignacia Velasco Durán
- Francisco Godoy as Camilo Briceño
- Hernán Lacalle as Florencio Gallardo
- Teresa Hales as Rebeca Ortiz
- Viviana Shieh as Yoko Ching Weng Hwa
- Constanza Palavicino as Alfonsina
- Julieta Flores Astorga como Fresia de las Mercedes
- Claudio Andía as Vittorio.

== See also ==
- Televisión Nacional de Chile
