= Paola Volpato =

Chilean actress

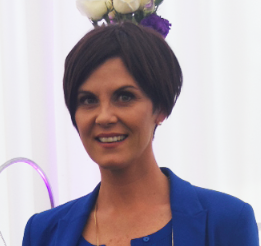
- Volpato in 2014
- Born: Paola Volpato Martín; 5 August 1969 (age 56); Santiago de Chile
- Occupation: Actress
- Years active: 1994–present
- Spouse: Felipe Castro
- Children: 2

Paola Volpato Martín (born August 5, 1969, in Santiago de Chile) is a Chilean actress.

== Personal life ==
Volpato is married to Chilean actor Felipe Castro with whom she has two children, Simón and Manuel. She is of Italian descent; her grandfather, Gaetano Volpato, was an Italian immigrant from Venice.

== Career ==
In 1986, she graduated from Scuola Italiana and pursued acting studies at the University of Chile.

She began her career as an actress with a small appearance in Rojo y miel (1994) on Televisión Nacional de Chile. During the following years, she participated in various roles in the cast of María Eugenia Rencoret in productions such as Tic Tac (1997), Aquelarre (1999), Amores de mercado (2001) and Destinos cruzados (2004).

In November 2002, she obtained the prize for best actress, voted by the judges of the international festival of Viña del Mar, for her acting in the movie Tres noches de un sábado.

Volpato has done as many roles in comedy as in dramas. In 2007, she became detective Eva Zanetti in Alguien Te Mira, while in the latter half of the same year she played Blanca del Bosque in Amor por Accidente. In 2008, Paola took part in the soap opera Viuda Alegre, where she played Mariana, ex-wife of the character played by Francisco Reyes. As of 2009, her career took off in the soap opera format, due to her role as "Consuelo Domínguez" in ¿Dónde está Elisa?, the antagonist. She later played "Paloma Subercaseaux" in Los Ángeles de Estela. Since 2014, she established her popularity on television with Pituca sin lucas and became the main actress of the Mega network. In 2022, she won a Produ Award as best supporting actress in a telenovela for Hijos del desierto.

== Filmography ==
Telenovela Roles
Year	Title	Role	Other notes
1994	Rojo y Miel	Isabel Andrade	
1995	Juegos de Fuego	Javiera Spencer	
1996	Loca Piel	María Olivia Carter	
1997	Tic Tac	Jocelyn Miranda	
1998	Borrón y Cuenta Nueva	María Elena Izquierdo	
1999	Aquelarre	Gustava Patiño	
2001	Amores de Mercado	Vicky Tapia	
2002	Purasangre	Matilde Godoy	
2003	Pecadores	Aída Echeverría / Elisa Cienfuegos	
2004	Destinos Cruzados	Cecilia Zamudio	
2005	Versus	María Elsa Pereira	
2006	Disparejas	Florencia Aguilar	
2007	Alguien Te Mira	Eva Zanetti	
2007	Amor por Accidente	Blanca del Bosque	
2008	Viuda Alegre	Mariana Huidobro	
2009	¿Dónde Está Elisa?	Consuelo Domínguez	
2009	Los Angeles de Estela	Paloma Subercaseaux	
2010	40 y Tantos	Loreto Estévez	
2011	El Laberinto de Alicia	Rebeca Brethauer	
2011	Su Nombre es Joaquín	Lola Briceño	
2012	Reserva de Familia	Paula Risopatrón	
2013	Socias	Monserrat Silva	
2014	Pituca Sin Lucas	María Teresa "Tichi" Achondo Amunategui	First Role on Mega
2016	Pobre Gallo	Patricia Flores	
2017 - 2018	Perdona nuestros pecados	Angela Bulnes	
2019	Isla Paraíso	Carolina Miranda / Celeste Miranda	
2021	Edificio Corona	Ágata Cárdenas	
2022	Hijos del desierto	Antonia Williams	

=== TV series ===
- Soltero a la medida, (Canal 13, 1994) - Irma
- Infieles (TVN, 2004) - Daniela
- Loco Por Ti (TVN, 2005) - Lisa
- Tiempo Final "Simulacro" (TVN, 2005) - Sofía
- La Vida es una Lotería "El Trato" (TVN, 2005) - Amanda
- Herederos "El Intento" (TVN, 2007) - Trinidad

=== Films ===
- Tres noches de un sábado (2002) - Quena
- The Prince (2019)

=== Theater ===
- Marat/Sade
- Buenas Noches, Mamá - Mónica
- Frágil (2003) - Lía
- Cangrejas (2003)
- Balada (2003) - Assistante de dirección
- La Señorita Julia
- El Rey se Muere - la reina Margarita
- Confesiones de mujeres de 30 -
- Cuerpos Mutilados en el Campo de Batlla (2007) - Vera
- El Mercader de Venecia
- Noche de Reyes (2009) - Olivia
