= Aquelarre (TV series) =

- Title card
- Genre: Serial drama
- Created by: Hugo Morales
- Screenplay by: Hugo Morales; Fernando Aragón; Arnaldo Madrid; Nona Fernández
- Directed by: María Eugenia Rencoret; Víctor Huerta
- Starring: Álvaro Escobar; Sigrid Alegría; Bastián Bodenhöfer; Álvaro Rudolphy
- Opening theme: "Tierra de Mujeres" by Douglas
- Country of origin: Chile
- Original language: Spanish
- No. of episodes: 103

Production
- Executive producer: Pablo Ávila
- Producer: Vania Portilla
- Camera setup: Multiple-camera
- Running time: 45–50 minutes
- Production company: Televisión Nacional de Chile

Original release
- Network: TVN; TV Chile
- Release: August 4 – December 29, 1999

Aquelarre (lit: Witches' Sabbath) is a classic Chilean television drama series which aired on Televisión Nacional de Chile (TVN) in 1999. It tells the story of a mysterious town in Southern Chile where only women had been born for 30 years. The series was created by Hugo Morales and directed by María Eugenia Rencoret, and Víctor Huerta. It originally aired on TVN and TV Chile from August 4, to December 29, 1999.

== Plot ==
This is a love story between Emilia (Sigrid Alegría) and Juan Pablo (Álvaro Rudolphy) who are members of two feuding families. This TV series is inspired by The House of Bernarda Alba chronicles which talk of the occurrence of a strange event. Aquelarre is located in central Chile. For the past thirty years only females are born amongst the town's inhabitants, no male has been born within its boundaries. All men are thirty or more and those with less have come from outside of town.

Three families control everything. Elena Vergara (Coca Guazzini) is a chemist who has developed a substance that prevents the birth of males.

She has a son, Juan Pablo, who lives in Holland and has arrived back in town and he suffering from leukemia. He falls in love with Emilia, daughter of Bernardita (Maricarmen Arrigorriaga), the Elena's archenemy.

Emilia has had to take over her late father's work, also maintaining the upkeep of the house and sisters. All of her sisters have male names as her parents has always wished for a son.

This family is only composed by women, each has a very particular characteristic. Rodolfa (Patricia Rivadeneira) has gone insane after her boyfriend Pepe Romano dumped her. Eduarda (Claudia Burr) who cannot control her passion for Toro Mardones (Francisco Pérez-Bannen), sweet Gustava (Paola Volpato) is a local school teacher, who has a physical problem, and the rude Ricarda (Yuyuniz Navas).

The home of Bernardita is a refuge for women Fernando (Edgardo Bruna) it is of men. Divorced three women has a child with each of them.

The phenomenon that makes only women born Ignacio Pastene (Bastian Bodenhöfer), a renowned geneticist, is to live in the village to investigate the phenomenon. There is reunited with Silvana (Catalina Guerra), a woman who never wanted to see in your life.

== Cast ==
=== Main characters ===
- Álvaro Escobar as Diego Guerra.
- Sigrid Alegría as Emilia Patiño.
- Bastián Bodenhöfer as Ignacio Pastene.
- Álvaro Rudolphy as Juan Pablo Huidobro.

=== Supporting characters ===
- Coca Guazzini as Elena Vergara.
- Edgardo Bruna as Fernando Guerra.
- Maricarmen Arrigorriaga as Bernarda Álvarez.
- Catalina Guerra as Silvana Montes
- Mauricio Pesutic as Prudencio Barraza.
- Ximena Rivas as Poncia.
- Jael Unger as Miss Julia Moya.
- Jaime Vadell as Pelayo, priest.
- Anita Klesky as Cándida Morales.
- Claudia Burr as Eduarda Patiño.
- Paola Volpato as Gustava Patiño.
- Patricia Rivadeneira as Rodolfa Patiño.
- Francisco Pérez-Bannen as Toro Mardones / Pepe Romano.
- Alejandra Fosalba as Tina Torres.
- Mónica Godoy as Scarlett Jara / Pía Montero.
- Felipe Braun as Gonzalo Guerra Bulnes.
- Lucy Salgado as Mireya Flores.
- Ana Reeves as Chela Ponce.
- Marcelo Romo as Celedonio Meneses.
- Katherine Salosny as Lorena Meneses.
- Íñigo Urrutia as Marcelo Guerra.
- Patricia López as Carolina Meneses.
- Claudio Arredondo as Benito.
- Yuyuniz Navas as Ricarda Patiño.
- Alejandro Montes as Cristián Guerra.
- Angélica Neumann as Camelia Huidobro / "The Bride of The Night"
- Carolina Contreras as Alelí Huidobro.
- Claudia Vergara as Isidora Orrego.
- Patricia Velasco as Rosita Moya.
- Carmina Riego as Lourdes.
- Mario Montilles as Mr. Artemio
- Mireya Moreno as Ruperta

=== Guest appearances ===
- Eduardo Barril as Mr. Jorge Patiño.
- Consuelo Holzapfel as Alicia Braun.
- Schlomit Baytelman as Mariola Bulnes.
- Loreto Valenzuela as Ivonne Garcés.
- Sergio Hernández as Maximiliano Jara Errázuriz.
- Francisca Reiss as Leticia Jara Ibáñez
- Nicolás Saavedra as Rigoberto Rodríguez.
- Rosario Zamora as Dra. Olsen

== International broadcast ==
- United States: Univisión.
