= María Eugenia Rencoret =

Chilean director (born 1964)

- Born: María Eugenia Rencoret Ríos; 11 November 1964 (age 61); Santiago, Chile
- Other name: Quena Rencoret
- Education: Professional Institute of Sciences and Arts (INCA-CEA)
- Occupations: Director, producer
- Years active: 1988–present
- Spouses: Luis Molina; Daniel Fernández Koprich (2010–present)
- Relatives: Jorge Rencoret (uncle)

María Eugenia Rencoret Ríos (born 11 November 1964), nicknamed "Quena", is a Chilean director and producer of telenovelas.

== Biography ==
María Eugenia Rencoret attended the Colegio de los Sagrados Corazones de Providencia. Later she studied television production and direction at the Professional Institute of Sciences and Arts (INCA-CEA) in Santiago. At age 20, she began her practice of television direction in the dramatic department of Televisión Nacional de Chile (TVN), achieving a professional title. The following year, Rencoret was hired by TVN executive producer Sonia Fuchs to join the team of assistant directors to Vicente Sabatini, Ricardo Vicuña, and René Schneider Arce.

In 1993 the state channel proposed to create a second semester of telenovelas, leaving the direction of Ámame to Rencoret. From then on, she was in charge of all productions during the second half of the year, among which dramatic shows stood out, such as Amores de mercado, the most watched telenovela in the history of the format of fiction with an average rating of 46.7 points.

In 2005 she took over as General Director of the Dramatic Department of the public station. After this appointment, Rencoret promoted the creation of the night slot with local dramatic shows, developing a series of fiction projects such as Los treinta, Alguien te mira, El señor de La Querencia, and ¿Dónde está Elisa? This series of stories brought in audiences, allowing the consolidation of a second block of television series at 11:30 pm.

In 2011 and under its mandate, TVN's Dramatic Department once again experienced growth, generating a third block of series, now at 3:30 pm. The lead show of this new format was Esperanza, in August 2011, starring Daniela Ramírez.

In January 2014, Rencoret resigned from TVN, and moved to Mega along with actors, directors, producers, and screenwriters, to develop and consolidate a new fiction department. This is how the Mega Dramatic Department was created. Since its first project, Pituca Sin Lucas, it has achieved great ratings success, allowing the private channel to consolidate three time slots with national productions. Among those that have achieved the greatest notoriety are Amanda, Sres. Papis, and Perdona nuestros pecados.

She has been married to executive Daniel Fernández Koprich since 2010. She was formerly married to producer Luis Molina, with whom she had three children.

== Positions ==
| Year | Title | Department | Channel |
|---|---|---|---|
| 1986–1991 | Assistant director | Dramatic | TVN |
| 1993–2005 | Director | Dramatic | TVN |
| 2005–present | Executive | Dramatic | TVN / Mega |

== Select filmography ==
=== Director ===
- 1993 – Ámame
- 1994 – Rojo y miel
- 1995 – Juegos de fuego
- 1996 – Loca piel
- 1997 – Tic Tac
- 1999 – Aquelarre
- 2000 – Santo ladrón
- 2001 – Amores de mercado
- 2002 – Purasangre
- 2003 – Pecadores
- 2004 – Destinos cruzados
- 2011 – Esperanza

=== Assistant director ===
- 1986 – La villa
- 1987 – Mi nombre es Lara
- 1988 – Bellas y audaces
- 1988 – Las dos caras del amor
- 1989 – A la sombra del ángel
- 1990 – El milagro de vivir
- 1991 – Volver a empezar
