= Mega (Chilean TV network) =

Chilean television network

- "Se siente bien"
- Country: Chile

Programming
- Language: Spanish
- Picture format: 1080i HDTV

Ownership
- Owner: Mega Media (Bethia)
- Sister channels: Mega 2 Mega Ficción

History
- Launched: 23 October 1990
- Former names: Megavisión (1990–2001)

Links
- Website: https://www.mega.cl/

Availability

Terrestrial
- Digital VHF: Listings may vary

Red Televisiva Megavisión S.A., commonly known as Mega, is a Chilean free-to-air television network owned by Mega Media, a Bethia holding company. It began its transmissions on 23 October 1990 as the first private television network in the country on channel 9 in Santiago, replacing Señal 2 of Televisión Nacional de Chile. The station is a member of the Asociación Nacional de Televisión and Organización de Telecomunicaciónes de Iberoamérica, and is part of the Alianza Informativa Latinoamericana

== History ==
=== Early years (1990–1992) ===
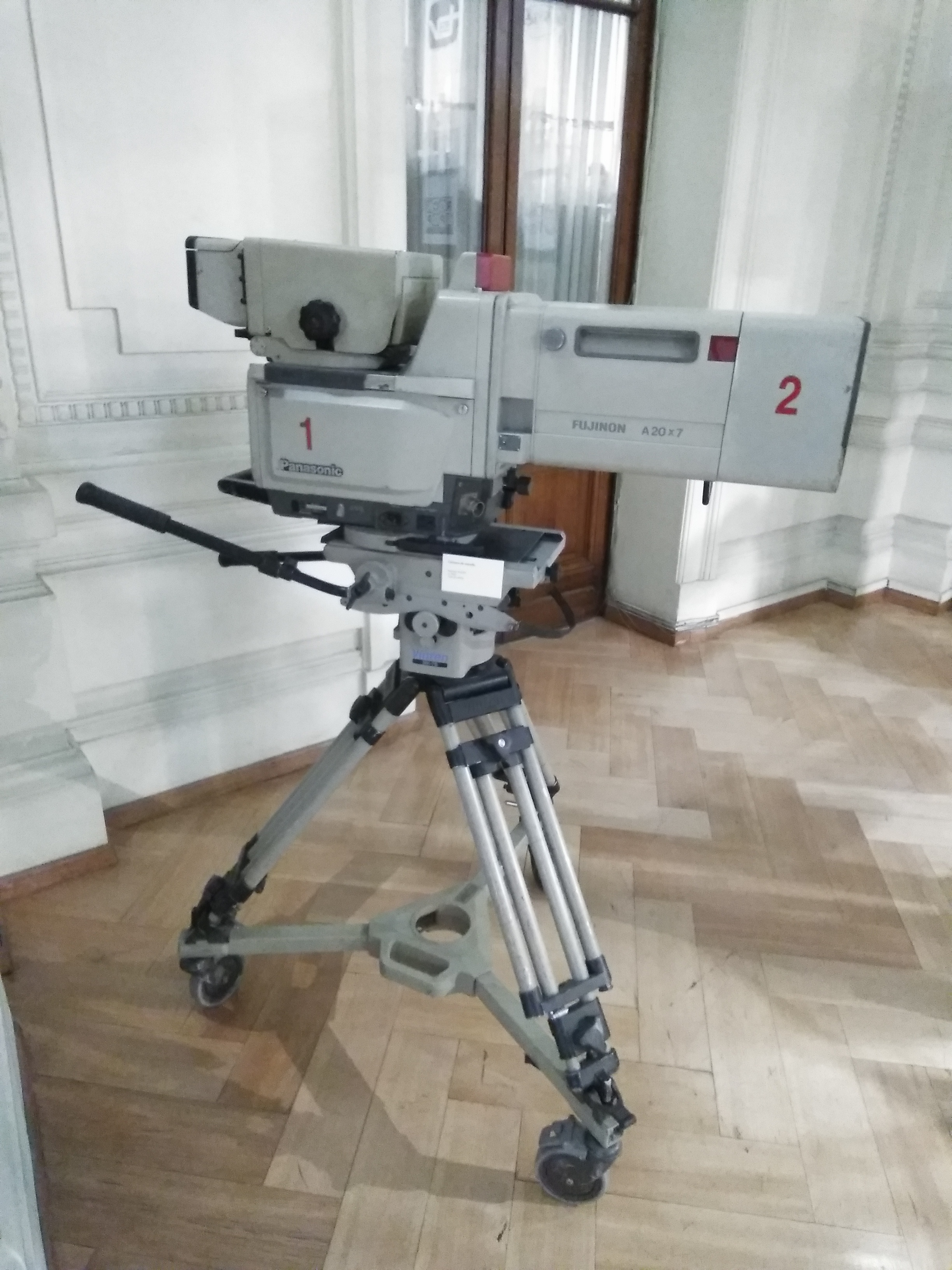
Camera used by Megavisión in its early years.

The channel began a sort of prelaunch on the night of 23 October 1990, first broadcasting a preview of its programming and then the movie Oliver. Meanwhile, in the courtyards of the channel, the new studios were inaugurated located in the old Cristalerías Chile factory, on Av. Vicuña Mackenna with the presence of President Patricio Aylwin and the owner of the channel, Ricardo Claro.

Its official broadcasts began with coverage only for the Gran Santiago and most of Metropolitan Region (on channel 9 VHF), and Valparaíso/Viña del Mar and its surroundings (on channel 5 VHF) at 1:00 p.m. the following day, with the First Edition of Meganoticias hosted by a journalist Susana Horno from the newsroom.

After its premiere, the channel had an initial period of low audiences. The panorama began to change due to a radical programmatic change thanks to the premiere of telenovelas produced by Televisa, which it broadcast constantly until 2016. Likewise, it acquired the broadcast rights of the Chilean National Tournament, the Copa Libertadores de América and the Copa América.

During the first half of the decade, Megavisión expanded its coverage. In the first half of 1991, the signal was extended to Talca, Chillán, Concepción, Temuco and Punta Arenas; at the end of the year, it reached a reception of more than 85% of the Chilean territory. The Megavisión station in Punta Arenas began broadcasting on Channel 12 on June 28, 1991, airing delayed programming, and switched to the live satellite feed from Santiago in 1993.

=== The mid-90s (1993–1999) ===
In 1991, Televisa kept 49% of the channel. With this, the development of co-productions was announced, such as the program Siempre en Domingo with Raúl Velasco from Santiago de Chile, as well as La Movida by Verónica Castro; however, Televisa's participation dropped to 33% in 1997, and in 1999 ownership of the channel would return entirely to Grupo Claro.

In March 1992, the programs Happening with ja, Good Afternoon, Eli with Eliana de Caso, and Accompáñeme with Julio Videla were integrated into the programming. Also, the Peruvian program Nubeluz is successfully released in the mornings. Initially, the episodes broadcast by Nubeluz were recorded, but over time they began to be broadcast live from Peru. In 1993, Megavisión together with Televisa obtained the concession to produce and broadcast the Viña del Mar International Song Festival, work that until then was carried out by Televisión Nacional de Chile; its animator, Antonio Vodanovic, emigrated to the channel to assume its conduction. That year, Mega also broadcast the Copa América played in Ecuador.

The version of the Viña Festival in 1994 was the first under the alliance with Televisa: the Mexican network acted as co-producer and intermediary to get figures such as the tenor Plácido Domingo and the youth group Onda Vaselina. It also broadcast that year the IMSA GT Championship, in which Eliseo Salazar stood out. That year there was already talk of the consolidation of the channel, and during this period Megavisión reached third place in annual audiences.

In 1995, Mega managed to retain the broadcast rights of the Spanish soccer league at the height of Iván Zamorano's career during his stay at Real Madrid, despite the high price of these. Also, that same year it broadcast the IndyCar Series (later the ChampCar Series), in which Salazar stood out.

Megavisión launched its website during the 1996 Viña del Mar Festival with an online broadcast of the event, in cooperation with MCL Internet, one of the first Internet providers in Chile; In the middle of the year, the Viña Festival concession was awarded again until 1999. The creation of an external soap opera company called Área Dramática was also announced, under the presidency of Bartolomé Dezerega and the direction of Ricardo Miranda, who until then had worked on Canal 13, and he broadcast the Olympics for the first time with the 1996 Summer Olympics. In April, he began broadcasting the 1998 CONMEBOL World Cup qualification, where he broadcasts the games of the Chilean Soccer Team as visitors against the teams of Venezuela, Ecuador, and Argentina. It also aired the three matches of those South American qualifiers.

In children's programming, in 1997, Megavisión premiered the original Dragon Ball; Due to its success, it aired their successors: Dragon Ball Z, and Dragon Ball GT. The financial situation of the channel in this period was negative, and it went from having CL$900 million in losses in 1996 to CL$5,000 million in 1997.

The dramatic area of Megavisión made its screen debut on 10 March 1997 with the telenovela Rossabella, which ranked third in audiences in the afternoon block. In the second semester, he failed Santiago City, which was taken off the screen in episode 17. The following year, A Todo Dar reached second place with a publicized audience; However, the channel decided not to premiere a telenovela in the second semester to invest those resources in 1999. The channel's fourth telenovela, Algo está cambiando, premiered in March 1999 with low audience ratings and was therefore moved to 22:00. The channel decided to close its dramatic area at the end of that year, and the actors that remained under contract dedicated themselves to animation.

== Programming ==
Among the many TV shows broadcast on MEGA (as of October 2025) are:

- Mucho gusto (breakfast television)
- Meganoticias (Daily News brand)
- Aguas de Oro (Television series)
- El Internado (Television series)
- Reunión de Superados (Television series)
- La Hora de Jugar (Game show)
- Leyla (Television series)
- Corazón Negro (Television series)
- Only Fama (Night talk show)
- ¿A qué costo? (Documentary about environment awareness)
- Viajando ando (Travel documentary)
- De aquí vengo yo (Documentary)
- Bajo el mismo techo (Documentary)
- De paseo (Weekend live TV show)
- Coliseo (Weekend comedy talent show)

=== Former Programming ===
- Casado con Hijos
- Centro de Alumnos
- Desfachatados
- Morande con Compañia

=== Acquired Programming ===
- Batman (TV series)
- Dragon Ball
- Dragon Ball Z
- Dragon Ball GT
- My Little Pony
- Pablo Escobar, The Drug Lord

=== Acquired Children Programming ===
These series were emitted by the blocks ZoloTV and MEGA Kids up until 2015, where MEGA stopped broadcasting cartoons.

- Avatar: The Last Airbender
- Ben 10: Alien Force
- Dexter's Laboratory
- Dora the Explorer
- El Chavo del 8
- El Chavo: The Animated Series
- Fanboy & Chum Chum
- Hey Arnold!
- Kung Fu Panda: Legends of Awesomeness
- My Little Pony: Friendship is Magic
- Spongebob Squarepants
- The Fairly Oddparents
- The Flintstones
- The Mighty B!
- The Penguins of Madagascar

== Slogans ==
- 1990–1991: El otro canal (The other channel)
- 1991–1992: Megavisión, estamos con usted (Megavision, we are with you)
- 1992–2001: Megavisión, mucho que ver (Megavision, much to see.)
- 2001–2010: Mega, ¡Se Vive! (Mega, It lives!.)
- 2010–2013: Mega, ¡me gusta! (Mega, I like it!)
- 2013–2015: Mega, cambia contigo (Mega, changes with you.)
- 2015–2018: Mi Mega (My Mega)
- 2018–2020: Tú nos inspiras (You inspire us)
- 2020–2022: Comparte (Share it)
- 2022-present: Se siente bien (It feels good)

== Logos ==
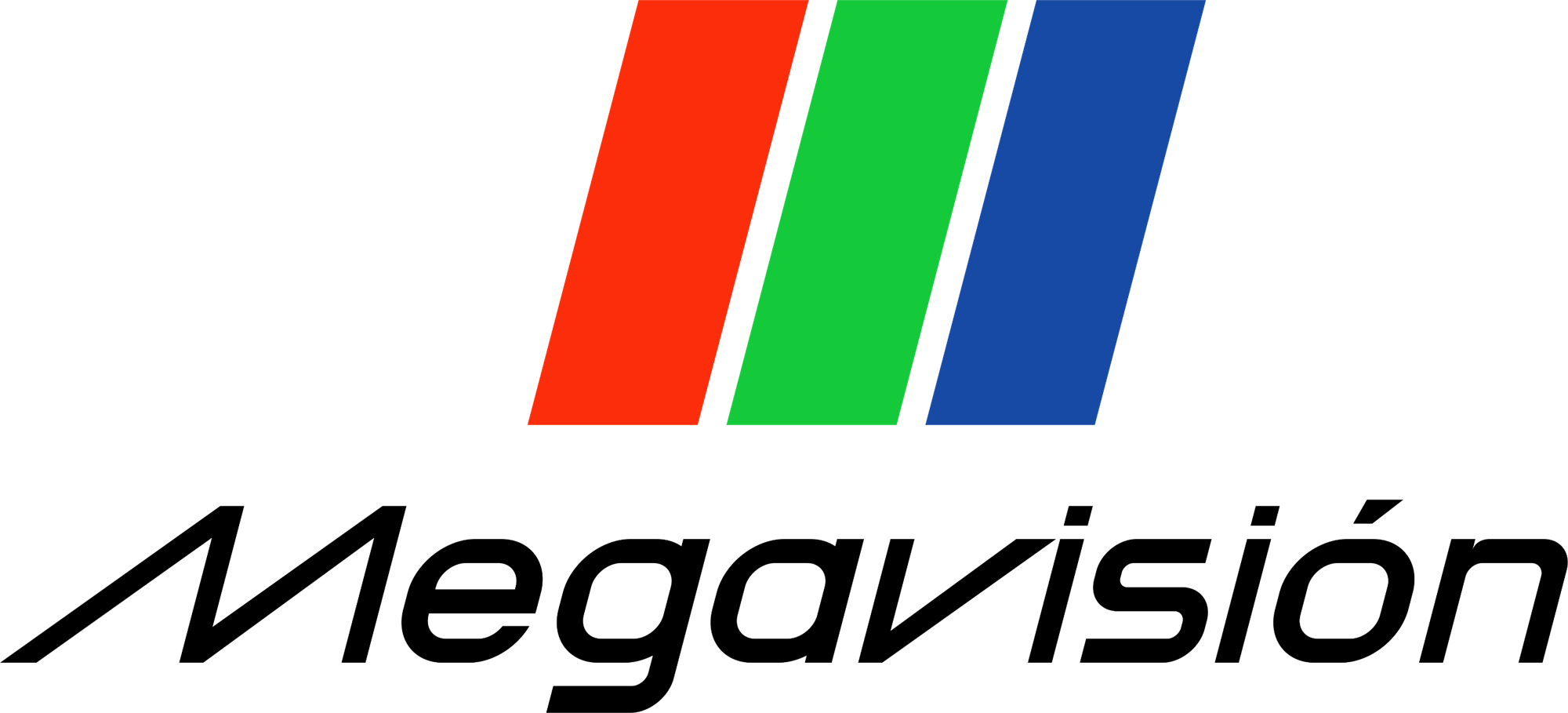
1999-2001

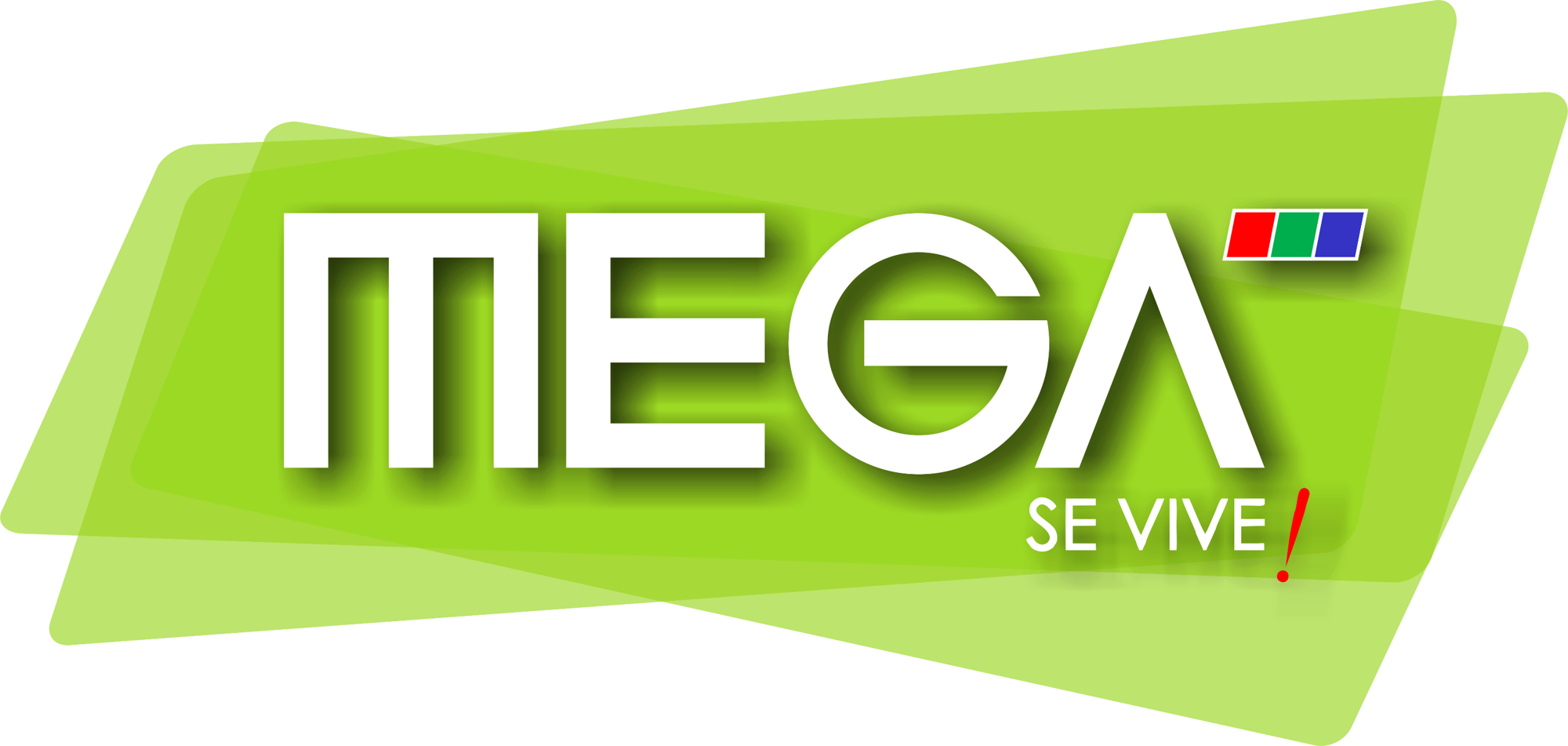
2006-2010

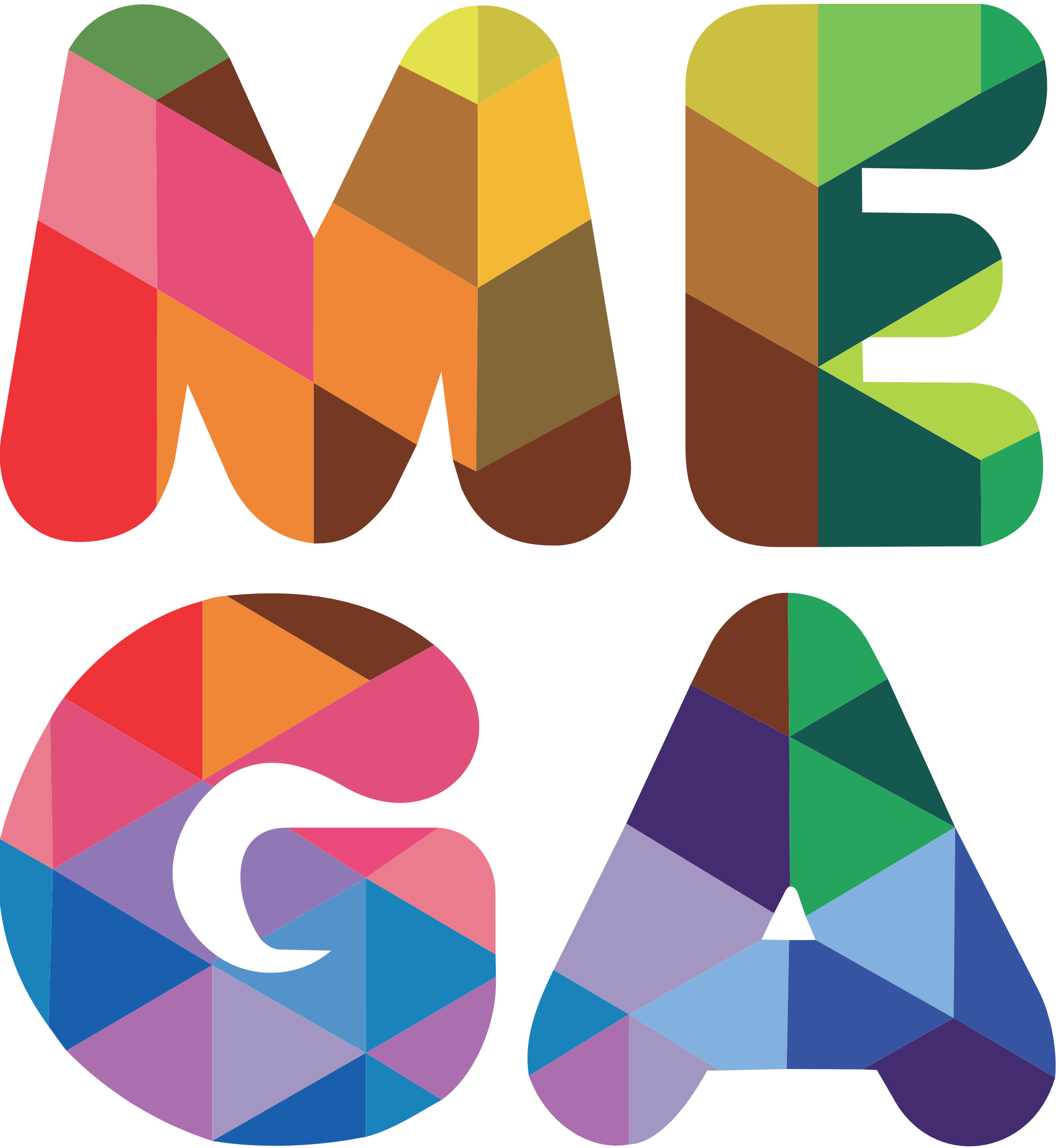
2010-2013

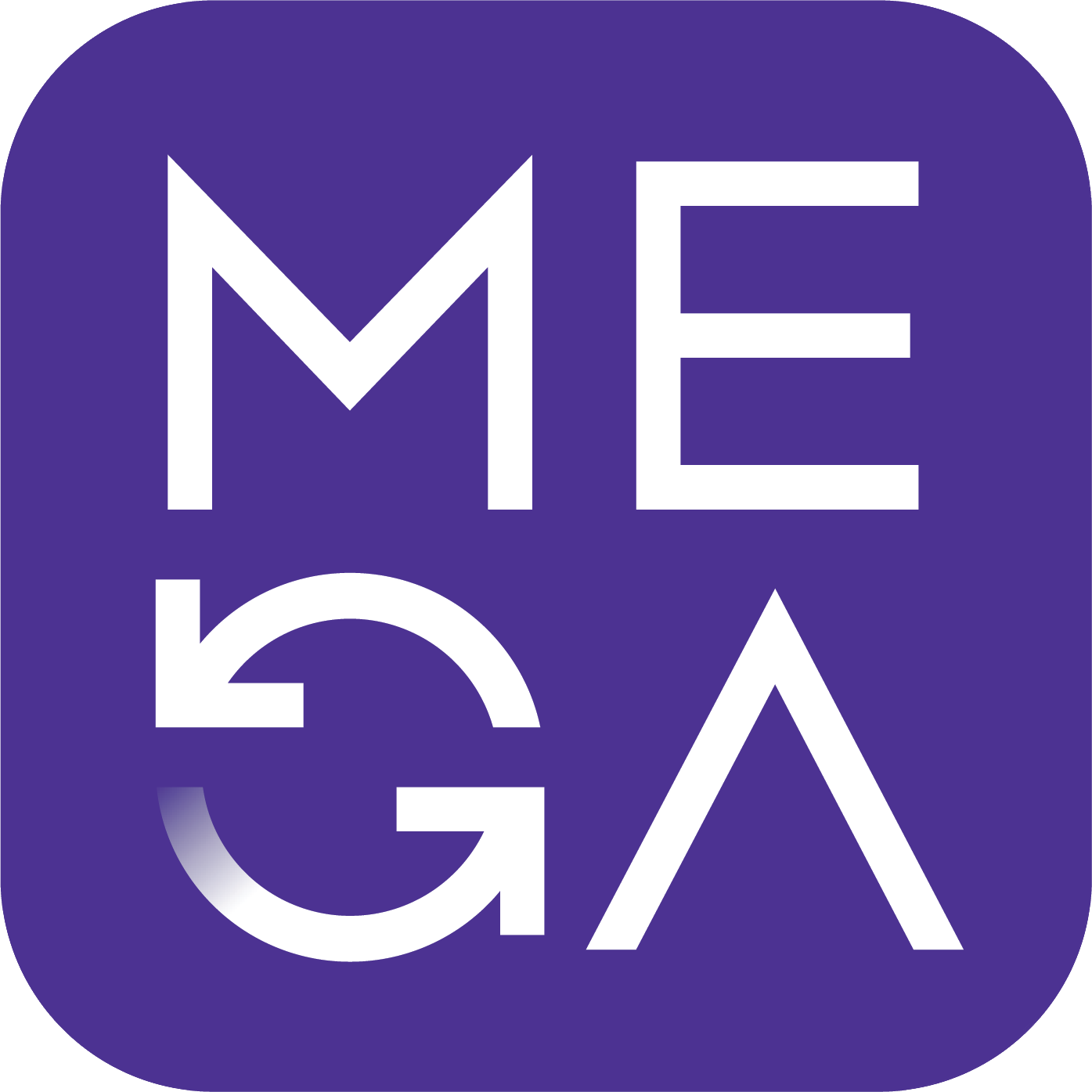
2013-2015

2015-2020

Current logo; 2020–present

== See also ==
- TVN
- Canal 13
- Chilevisión
- ETC
