= List of Mega (Chilean TV network) telenovelas =

The following is a list of telenovelas produced by Mega.

== 1990s ==
Year	Title	Premiere date	Finale date	No. of episodes	Ref.
1997	Rossabella	March 10, 1997	July 23, 1997	95	
1997	Santiago City	July 23, 1997	August 14, 1997	17	
1998	A todo dar	March 9, 1998	November 10, 1998	156	
1999	Algo está cambiando	March 8, 1999	July 23, 1999	97	

== 2000s ==
Year	Title	Premiere date	Finale date	No. of episodes	Ref.
2006	Montecristo	October 16, 2006	March 15, 2007	94	
2007	Fortunato	August 28, 2007	January 9, 2008	93	

== 2010s ==
Year	Title	Premiere date	Finale date	No. of episodes	Ref.
2011	Decibel 110	October 12, 2011	April 15, 2012	60	
2012	Maldita	May 22, 2012	August 2, 2012	42	
2014	Pituca sin lucas	October 13, 2014	May 25, 2015	153	
2015	Papá a la deriva	May 25, 2015	February 29, 2016	183	
2015	Eres mi tesoro	July 29, 2015	April 6, 2016	171	
2016	Pobre gallo	January 6, 2016	August 22, 2016	160	
2016	Te doy la vida	April 5, 2016	November 23, 2016	158	
2016	Sres. Papis	June 28, 2016	March 6, 2017	144	
2016	Ámbar	August 22, 2016	April 10, 2017	158	
2016	Amanda	November 22, 2016	July 25, 2017	170	
2017	Perdona nuestros pecados	March 6, 2017	August 22, 2018	312	
2017	Tranquilo papá	April 10, 2017	January 9, 2018	187	
2017	Verdades ocultas	July 24, 2017	June 22, 2022	1128	
2018	Si yo fuera rico	January 8, 2018	October 2, 2018	172	
2018	Casa de muñecos	August 20, 2018	March 11, 2019	128	
2018	Isla Paraíso	October 2, 2018	September 4, 2019	233	
2019	Juegos de poder	March 11, 2019	December 12, 2019	161	
2019	Yo soy Lorenzo	September 2, 2019	May 25, 2020	148	
2019	100 días para enamorarse	December 9, 2019	March 14, 2021	152	

== 2020s ==
Year	Title	Premiere date	Finale date	No. of episodes	Ref.
2021
2021	Edificio Corona	January 11, 2021	August 9, 2021	120	
2021	Demente	March 15, 2021	November 23, 2021	140	
2021	Pobre novio	August 9, 2021	June 7, 2022	172	
2021	Amar profundo	November 23, 2021	August 24, 2022	156	
2022
2022	La ley de Baltazar	June 7, 2022	May 10, 2023	221	
2022	Hasta encontrarte	June 22, 2022	December 12, 2022	98	
2022	Hijos del desierto	August 23, 2022	June 5, 2023	163	
2023	Juego de ilusiones	January 16, 2023	March 18, 2025	550	
2023	Como la vida misma	May 9, 2023	July 22, 2024	286	
2023	Generación 98	June 5, 2023	April 22, 2024	178	
2024	Al sur del corazón	April 9, 2024	November 25, 2024	154	
2024	El señor de La Querencia	July 17, 2024	December 5, 2024	78	
2024	Nuevo amores de mercado	November 25, 2024	July 30, 2025	144	
2024	Los Casablanca	December 3, 2024	September 24, 2025	156	
2025	El jardín de Olivia	March 17, 2025	August 17, 2026	358	
2025	Aguas de oro	July 30, 2025	May 14, 2026	147	
2025	Reunión de superados	September 23, 2025	present	TBA	
2026	La baronesa	August 17, 2026	present	TBA	

== See also ==
- Mega (Chilean TV network)
- List of Chilean telenovelas
- List of Chilean films
- List of Chilean actors
