= María Gracia Omegna =

Chilean actress

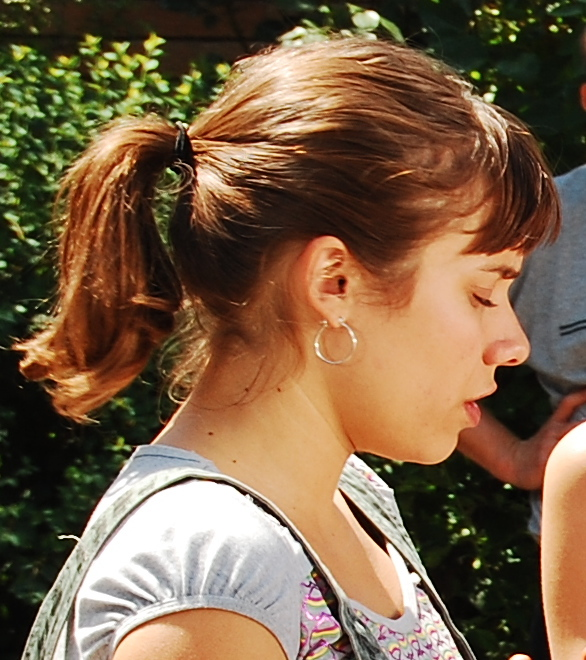
- Omegna in 2009
- Born: María Gracia Andrea Omegna Vergara; November 10, 1984 (age 41)
- Occupation: Actress
- Years active: 2007-present
- Height: 1.62 m (5 ft 4 in)
- Partner(s): Fernando Guzzoni (2007-2015); Gonzalo Valenzuela (2015-2021); Gabriel Urzúa -Present
- Children: 1

María Gracia Andrea Omegna Vergara (born November 10, 1984) is a Chilean actress. She is known for the productions Dama y obrero and Papá a la deriva, as well as the film Joven y alocada.

== Career ==
She studied theater at the Finis Terrae University, where she was also part of the institution's student federation. Shortly before graduating from it, her aunt, the actress Berta Lasala, encouraged her to participate in a casting on Channel 13 for a television series. Although she was not among her interests to act on television, she went, but she did not stay. A year later, Herval Abreu called her for another audition and she entered the cast of Lola. She later she would participate in Corazón rebelde (Chilean version of the Argentine Rebelde Way), playing Pilar Ortúzar.

María Gracia was a theater woman, from a very young age she was part of the company "Lafamiliateatro", with whom she made some productions, including a tour to Bolivia and with whom she continues to collaborate until today, becoming the official presenter of the Santiago Off Festival, organized by your company in 2012 and 2013.

In 2010 she was hired by TVN, where she achieved her first leading role in a telenovela, this time as Leonor Encina in the historical television series Martín Rivas, where she stars in a loving romance with the protagonist Diego Muñoz.

She made her film debut with the film The Life of Fish directed by Matías Bize, a Goya Award-winning film.

In 2011, for the second time she takes a leading role in the production of Témpano, playing Amparo Benavente, a woman who comes for cold revenge. This dramatic production was recorded in Puerto Natales and Santiago.

In 2012, for the third time in a row, she takes a leading role, this time in the successful daytime production Dama y obrero, playing Ignacia Villavicencio, a millionaire married woman who ends up falling in love with a poor worker played by Francisco Pérez-Bannen.

That same year, she also obtained a leading role in the cinema, in the film Joven y alocada, directed by Marialy Rivas and based on the homonymous book by Camila Gutiérrez, in which she plays Antonia, a university student who is the niece of the director of an evangelical channel, who is romantically involved with the protagonist, Daniela, a bisexual student who recounts her controversial experiences and the conflicts that occur between her conservative family contrasted with her rebellious sexuality, played by Alicia Rodríguez. The film was released worldwide on January 21, 2012, at the Sundance Film Festival, where it won the award for best screenplay.

In 2013 she plays the lawyer and human rights activist Carmen Hertz in the Chilevisión miniseries Ecos del Desierto, directed by Andrés Wood.

After five years on TVN, in 2015 she emigrated to the Mega to play the role of Violeta Padilla in the television series Papá a la deriva, where she also shares the limelight with actor Gonzalo Valenzuela. The following year, she would make the first night production of her, the Chilean version of Señores Papis, where she also shares with the actors Jorge Zabaleta, Francisco Melo and Diego Muñoz.

By 2018, she would be back in an evening production of Mega, Si yo fuera rico, starring Gonzalo Valenzuela again, also with Mariana Loyola and Jorge Zabaleta. Since 2015 she has been in a relationship with the Chilean actor Gonzalo Valenzuela, whom she met during Papá a la deriva. On September 30, 2019, Anka was born, her first daughter with Gonzalo Valenzuela. In 2021 they announced their separation.

In 2021 she starred in Edificio Corona as Javiera Sandoval, a successful Mega telenovela.

== Filmography ==
=== Film ===
Year	Film	Character	Director
2010	La vida de los peces	Carolina	Matías Bize
2012	Joven y alocada	Antonia	Marialy Rivas
2012	Voces al viento	Paula	Daniela Prado
2013	Carne de perro	Gabriela	Fernando Guzzoni
2013	El facilitador	Elena	Víctor Arregui
2016	Andrés lee i escribe	Dominga	Daniel Peralta
2017	Canasto de Cangrejos	Pascal	Paulo Cabrera Lasala
2018	Princesita	Profesora	Marialy Rivas
2019	Araña	Nadia	Andrés Wood

=== Telenovelas ===
Year	Telenovela	Character	Role	Channel
2007–2008	Lola	Mercedes Pacheco	Recurring	Canal 13
2009	Corazón rebelde	Pilar Ortúzar	Main cast	Canal 13
2010	Martín Rivas	Leonor Encina Núñez	Main role	Televisión Nacional de Chile
2011	Témpano	Amparo Benavente	Main role	Televisión Nacional de Chile
2012–2013	Dama y obrero	Ignacia Villavicencio	Main role	Televisión Nacional de Chile
2014	El amor lo manejo yo	Natalia Duque	Main role	Televisión Nacional de Chile
2015–2016	Papá a la deriva	Violeta Padilla	Main role	Mega
2016–2017	Señores papis	Ema Díaz	Main role	Mega
2018	Si yo fuera rico	Pascuala Domínguez	Main role	Mega
2020	Edificio Corona	Javiera	Main role	Mega
2021	Amar profundo	Tamara Contreras Solís	Main role	Mega
2022	Hijos del desierto	Bianca Lombardo	Main role	Mega
2023	Generación 98	Valentina Morán	Main role	Mega
2024	El señor de la querencia	Leonor Amenábar	Main role	Mega

=== TV series ===
Year	Serie	Character	Role	Channel
2013	Ecos del desierto	Carmen Hertz (1973)	Main role	CHV
2014	Pulseras rojas	Mireya Muñoz	Main role	TVN
2020	La Jauría	Carla Farías	Main role	Amazon
2020	Historias de cuarentena	Mónica	Main role	Mega
