= El señor de La Querencia =

El señor de La Querencia may refer to either of two Chilean telenovelas:

- El señor de La Querencia (2008 TV series), produced and aired by Televisión Nacional de Chile
- El señor de La Querencia (2024 TV series), produced and aired by Mega
