= A.mar, donde el amor teje sus redes =

- Genre: Telenovela
- Based on: Amar profundo by Jonathan Cuchacovich
- Developed by: Juan Carlos Alcalá
- Written by: Rosa Salazar; Alejandra Díaz; José Rubén Núñez; Ruth Tovar
- Directed by: Alejandro Gamboa; Isaías Gómez May
- Starring: David Zepeda; Eva Cedeño; Pedro Moreno; Laura Carmine; Víctor González; Sergio Reynoso; Ana Martín
- Theme music composer: Jorge Eduardo Murguía; Mauricio L. Arriaga; Edén Muñoz
- Opening theme: "Enamórate de Mí" by Edén Muñoz
- Composers: Jorge Eduardo Murguía; Mauricio L. Arriaga; Ricardo Larrea
- Country of origin: Mexico
- Original language: Spanish
- No. of seasons: 1
- No. of episodes: 90

Production
- Executive producer: Ignacio Sada Madero
- Producers: Arturo Pedraza Loera; J. Antonio Arvizu Velázquez
- Editors: Israel Flores Ordaz; Luis Antonio Paz
- Camera setup: Multi-camera
- Production company: TelevisaUnivision

Original release
- Network: Las Estrellas
- Release: 10 February – 13 June 2025

A.mar, donde el amor teje sus redes (English: At Sea, Where Love Cast Its Net) is a Mexican telenovela produced by Ignacio Sada Madero for TelevisaUnivision. It is based on the 2021 Chilean telenovela Amar profundo, created by Jonathan Cuchacovich. The series stars Eva Cedeño and David Zepeda. It aired on Las Estrellas from 10 February 2025 to 16 June 2025.

== Plot ==
Estrella Contreras, a single mother struggling to raise her daughter Azul, returns to her hometown after the death of her father, where she meets Fabián Bravo, a widowed father and fisherman who is fighting to regain custody of his daughter Yazmin. They fall in love, but this will be complicated by the intrigues of Érika Méndez, Fabián's ex-girlfriend, and the ambition of Sergio Falcón, a powerful businessman and Azul's father, who seek to prevent their relationship, leading Fabián and Estrella to face a whirlwind of misfortunes, while always protecting the well-being of their families.

== Cast ==
=== Main ===
- David Zepeda as Fabián Bravo Jiménez
- Eva Cedeño as Estrella Contreras Lara
- Pedro Moreno as Gabriel Arenas Neira
- Laura Carmine as Érika Méndez García
- Víctor González as Sergio Falcón Tagle
- Sergio Reynoso as Gonzalo Bravo
- Ana Martín as Mercedes "Meche" Lara
- Sofía Olea Levet as Marina / Antonia Montoya Báez
- Diego de Erice as Nicolás Fuentes Urrutia
- Gaby Mellado as Brisa Contreras Lara
- Diana Haro as Perla Contreras Lara
- Ramsés Alemán as Valentín Ríos
- Lalo Palacios as Pascual Ochoa
- Claudia Troyo as Teresita de Jesús García de Serrano
- José Montini as Nemesio Serrano Pérez
- Jonnathan Kuri as Juan José "Juanjo" Martínez
- Fabiola Andere as Adriana Montoya Flores
- Martín Brek as Porfirio Rojas
- Gaby Ramírez as Matilde Rosado
- Karla Gaytán as Yazmín Bravo
- Andrés Vázquez as Oliver Parra
- Davi Ulloa as Xavier Lazcano
- Camille Mina as Azul Contreras
- Sebastián Guevara as Íker Arenas
- Eugenia Cauduro as Gertrudis Cuevas Castillo
- Ricardo Vera as Lorenzo Falcón Jara
- Olivia Collins as Rosalba Méndez García

=== Recurring and guest stars ===
- Juan Carlos Barreto as Ulises Contreras
- Martín Rojas as Jacinto López "Tiburón"
- Irantzu Herrero as Beatriz Espinoza Brizuela
- Juan Sahagún
- José Luis Duval
- Andrea Portugal as Laura de Bravo
- Arturo Vázquez as Víctor

== Production ==
On 9 August 2024, Ignacio Sada was named the executive producer of a remake of the 2021 Chilean telenovela Amar profundo, stepping in for Nicandro Díaz González following his death in March 2024. A few days later, Eva Cedeño and David Zepeda were confirmed in the lead roles. Throughout late August and early September, Sada revealed cast and characters through his social media accounts. Filming began on 7 October 2024.

== Episodes ==
No.	Title	Original release date	Mexico viewers (millions)
1	"Me llamo Estrella Contreras"	10 February 2025 (Note: Premiered early online through Las Estrellas website on 7 February 2025.)	5.19
Estrella is very excited about her promotion to manager at the restaurant where she works, but is informed that the position will be taken by the owner's niece. Ulises is very excited about Fabian's loan to start a restaurant, but in reality he is murdered by Rosalba since she has never forgiven him for leaving her for Meche. Estrella, her mother and her sisters are very excited to find out what surprise their father has for them; however, they are informed them that Ulises died. Estrella arrives at La Peñita to say her last goodbye to her father, but before arriving home, she decides to go to the beach to remember the beautiful moments she spent by his side, Fabián sees her crying and comes to help her and learns that she is Ulises' daughter.
2	"Tu padre falsificó mi firma"	11 February 2025	5.58
Fabián confesses to his father that he felt a special connection when he met Estrella, Érika, upon hearing him, feels jealous. Érika arrives at Estrella's house to inform her that Fabián is accusing Ulises of stealing a million pesos from the union. Estrella slaps Fabián after learning that he is accusing his father of theft, he asks her to calm down and is sorry for everything that is happening, but there are documents to prove it. Rojas shows Estrella the documents her father signed and informs her that he is giving her three months to settle the debt.
3	"Mucha suerte Estrella"	12 February 2025	5.26
Fabián begs Gertrudis to forget the past and let him be near his daughter, otherwise, he is ready to report her since Yazmín almost died under her care. Estrella informs her family that they were denied bank credit, so now they must devote more time to the business on the beach. Iker visits Marina in the hospital to give her the drawing he made for her, but learns that she will be discharged and asks his father to take care of her. Estrella is willing to become the first woman fisherman in order to support her family and pay Fabián every last peso.
4	"Eres increíble Estrella"	13 February 2025	5.45
Estrella informs her father's employees that she will become the captain, they immediately refuse to let a woman lead them. Gertrudis makes Yazmín believe that Fabián has regained legal custody of her, but asks her to be the one to finish off her father. Estrella gets ready to go fishing; however, when she tries to move the boat, she falls and Tiburón takes the opportunity to mock her by assuring her that she doesn't have the strength for the job. Estrella confirms that Érika is intervening in her problems with Fabián and asks her to stay out of the way; Érika silently warns that she will not rest until she sees Estrella out of town.
5	"No pienso firmar ningún contrato"	14 February 2025	4.99
Fabián blames Estrella for cutting his nets, so he decides to take all her catch, she stops him, but in her anger, she takes one of her boxes and empties it on top of him. When Estrella learns that it was Tiburón who cut the nets, she warns Fabián that he doesn't know what kind of "shark" he has just thrown on himself. Perla breaks down in tears as she remembers the day she was a victim of Tiburón's evil. Fabián shows his concern when he sees that Estrella and her family will be in charge of the fishing, she assures him that he should worry about his employees since he put a traitor in his crew.
6	"Tú me abandonaste"	17 February 2025	4.57
Yazmín asks Fabián to thank Érika for convincing her to move in with him and acknowledges that she is very much in love with him, but regrets that he is going to destroy her life as he did with her mother and her. Fabián complains to Érika for meddling in his daughter's affairs and assures her that he won't forgive her for ruining his plans. Perla complains to Brisa for not helping during the fishing trip, Estrella tries to calm her sisters' tempers and asks them to do their part. Perla gets the courage to reiterate to Fabián that it was Tiburón who tore the fishing nets.
7	"Te ofrezco una disculpa"	18 February 2025	4.92
Fabián comes to blows with Tiburón when he sees him trying to assault Estrella. Estrella breaks down in tears when she assures Fabián that everyone has turned their backs on her and has trampled her just because she is a woman and she is sure that even he won't want her in the union. Estrella tells her mother that Tiburón tried to attack her, but Fabián defended her and when she was in his arms, she felt protected. Perla, feeling in danger, reveals to her sisters and Meche that Tiburón raped her.
8	"El Tiburon murió"	19 February 2025	5.30
Érika asks Yazmín to make Fabián believe that she will give him a chance as a father and not to forget their agreement to support each other, otherwise she might reveal that she has an addiction. Officer Matilde confirms to Fabián the death of Tiburón, Estrella hears the news and tells Perla that her attacker was found dead on the seashore. Fabián seeks to remedy his mistake with Estrella and through a letter acknowledges that he should never have doubted her ability as a woman. Estrella tells Fabian that Érika suspects that there may be a relationship between the two of them, but they agree that it is absurd that a special affection could be born.
9	"Un nuevo comienzo"	20 February 2025	5.10
Brisa gets fed up with Marina and fights with her, but Gabriel separates them. Pascual declares his love to Perla after Valentín breaks her heart. Érika confesses to Fabián that she hopes to get back together with him; meanwhile, she causes him problems with his daughter, Yazmín. After the argument with Brisa, Marina makes the difficult decision to leave Iker and Gabriel. Estrella and Fabián decide to leave the problems in the past and start their friendship again. Gabriel confesses to Fabián that he wants to marry Brisa.
10	"Me traicionaste"	21 February 2025	4.96
11	"Estrella me gusta y mucho"	24 February 2025	5.21
12	"No te puedo sacar de mi cabeza"	25 February 2025	5.13
13	"Soy estéril"	26 February 2025	5.07
14	"Tus ojos no saben mentir"	27 February 2025	5.35
15	"Soy tu hija Azul"	28 February 2025	4.67
16	"Me estoy enamorando de Estrella"	3 March 2025	4.99
17	"Llegó el momento de aceptar lo que sentimos"	4 March 2025	4.76
18	"No quiero un padre como usted"	5 March 2025	4.59
19	"Siento algo por Fabián"	6 March 2025	5.11
20	"Te ofrezco mi corazón"	7 March 2025	4.99
21	"Nunca estuve enamorado de ti"	10 March 2025	4.61
22	"¿Qué es esto mamá?"	11 March 2025	5.47
23	"Me enamoré perdidamente de ti"	12 March 2025	4.88
24	"No te quiero como mi papá"	13 March 2025	4.62
25	"No eres bienvenido en la foto familiar"	14 March 2025	4.53
26	"¿Quién te dio el derecho de llamar al padre de mi hija?"	17 March 2025	4.63
27	"Hay que intentarlo Fabián"	18 March 2025	5.20
28	"¿Qué va a pasar con Iker?"	19 March 2025	5.03
29	"A Estrella la amo"	20 March 2025	4.32
30	"Es mi hija"	21 March 2025	4.87
31	"Ya sé que Iker no es tu hijo"	24 March 2025	4.38
32	"Estoy harta de que me manipules"	25 March 2025	4.89
33	"Vengo con una orden de desalojo"	26 March 2025	5.07
34	"Yo tomé el dinero"	27 March 2025	4.51
35	"Quiero estar contigo"	28 March 2025	4.49
36	"Vas a pagar cada una de mis lágrimas"	31 March 2025	4.84
37	"Acepto tu ayuda Sergio"	1 April 2025	4.22
38	"Iker no es mi hijo"	2 April 2025	4.75
39	"Te amo hijo"	3 April 2025	4.64
40	"Si mi papá se va, será tu culpa"	4 April 2025	4.41
41	"Eres una egoísta"	7 April 2025	4.37
42	"No soy tu padre biológico"	8 April 2025	4.32
43	"Solo me deberás un favor"	9 April 2025	4.72
44	"Quiero darle mi apellido a Azul"	10 April 2025	4.85
45	"Te amo Perla"	11 April 2025	4.32
46	"Lo hiciste para acorralarme"	14 April 2025	4.70
47	"No deberías estar viva"	15 April 2025	4.57
48	"Esto llega hasta aquí Pascual"	16 April 2025	4.73
49	"Tu novio me da miedo"	17 April 2025	3.79
50	"Estrella se enteró que estuvimos juntos"	18 April 2025	3.48
51	"¡Lo amo!"	21 April 2025	3.92
52	"Gabriel obtiene la adopción de Iker"	22 April 2025	4.31
53	"Antonia era mi esposa"	23 April 2025	4.50
54	"Cuando pienso bien, me equivoco"	24 April 2025	4.47
55	"Una pelea sin futuro"	25 April 2025	4.93
56	"Quiero trabajar para ti"	28 April 2025	4.91
57	"Somos hermanas"	29 April 2025	4.83
58	"¡Húndete sola!"	30 April 2025	4.43
59	"Los necesito en Alpha Sur"	1 May 2025	4.37
60	"Soy tu esposo"	2 May 2025	4.30
61	"¿Él es Nico?"	5 May 2025	5.03
62	"¿Quieres saber si Iker es tu hijo?"	6 May 2025	4.55
63	"Le voy a quitar a Azul"	7 May 2025	4.18
64	"Recordé a mi hijo"	8 May 2025	4.20
65	"No eres la madre de Iker"	9 May 2025	4.42
66	"Necesitamos a Nicolás"	12 May 2025	4.38
67	"Érika y Estrella son hermanas"	13 May 2025	4.62
68	"Tu papá es Ulises Contreras"	14 May 2025	4.14
69	"Te voy a refundir en la cárcel"	15 May 2025	4.12
70	"Sí quiero casarme contigo"	16 May 2025	4.55
71	"No me encierres en una clínica"	19 May 2025	4.65
72	"Sé valiente Yazmín"	20 May 2025	4.18
73	"Soy muy feliz"	21 May 2025	4.32
74	"Le voy a dar una oportunidad a Nicolás"	22 May 2025	3.95
75	"¿No te querías casar conmigo?"	23 May 2025	4.22
76	"¡Me la voy a jugar!"	28 May 2025	4.67
77	"Me casé con el amor de mi vida"	27 May 2025	5.06
78	"Me gustan los dos a morir"	28 May 2025	4.52
79	"Iker es mi hijo"	29 May 2025	4.42
80	"Nicolás y yo somos sus papás biológicos"	30 May 2025	4.85
81	"Yo soy tu mamá"	2 June 2025	4.90
82	"Estoy embarazada"	3 June 2025	4.81
83	"Érika espera un hijo mío"	4 June 2025	4.77
84	"Va a contar la verdad del embarazo"	5 June 2025	5.06
85	"Ya no puedo seguir callada"	6 June 2025	4.84
86	"Esto es un error"	9 June 2025	4.95
87	"Érika no está embarazada"	10 June 2025	4.70
88	"No estoy embarazada"	11 June 2025	4.95
89	"Ganaste Estrella"	12 June 2025	4.77
90	"Acepto casarme con Fabián"	13 June 2025	5.07

== Reception ==
=== Ratings ===
Viewership and ratings per season of A.mar, donde el amor teje sus redes
Season	Timeslot (CT)	Episodes	First aired		Last aired		Avg. viewers (millions)
Season	Timeslot (CT)	Episodes	Date	Viewers (millions)	Date	Viewers (millions)	Avg. viewers (millions)
1	Mon–Fri 8:30 p.m.	90	10 February 2025	5.19	13 June 2025	5.07	4.69

=== Awards and nominations ===
Year	Award	Category	Nominated	Result	Ref
2025	Premios Juventud	They Make Me Fall in Love	Eva Cedeño & David Zepeda	Nominated	
