= Antonia Zegers =

Chilean actress (born 1972)

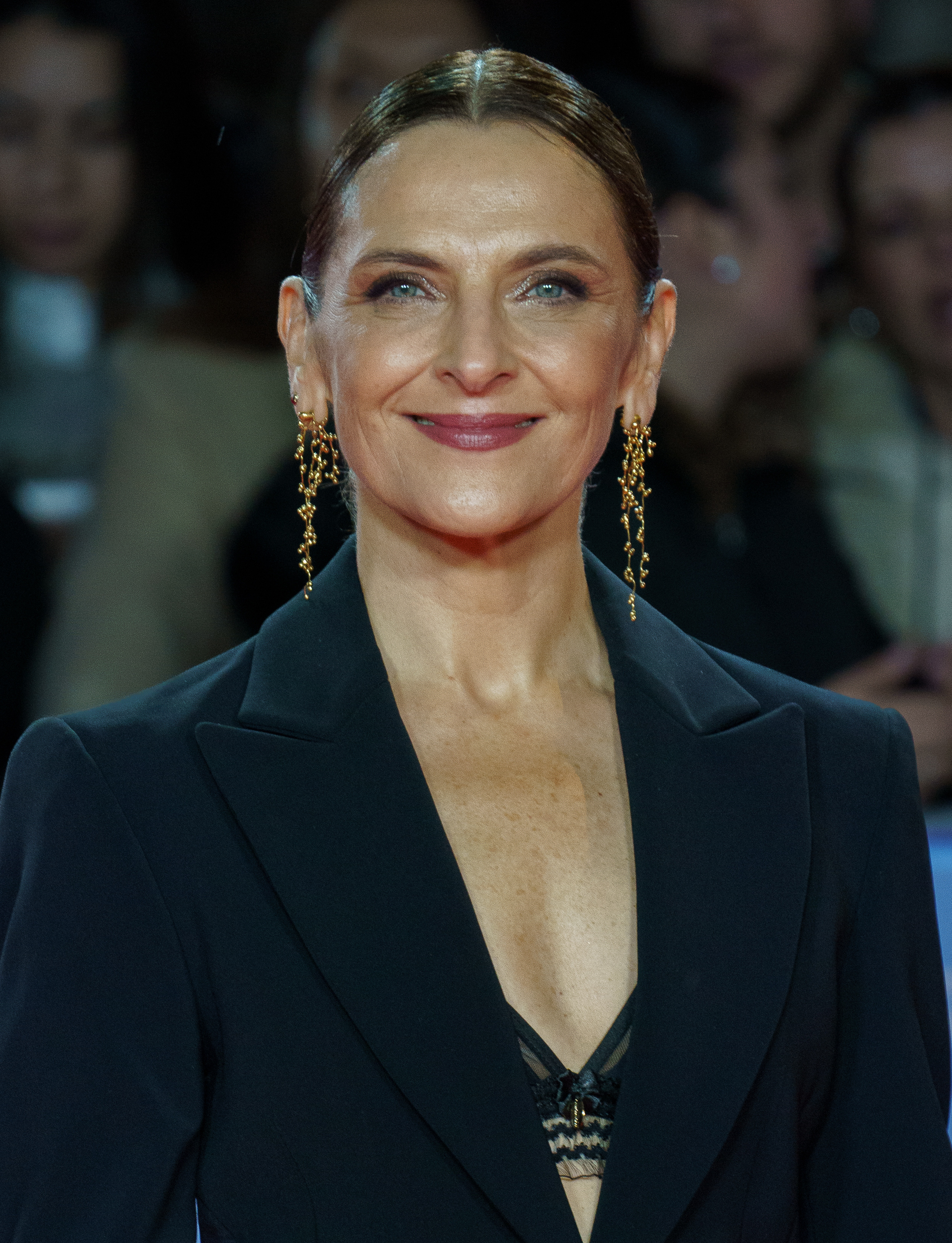
- Zegers in 2025
- Born: 29 June 1972 (age 54); Santiago, Chile
- Occupation: Actress
- Years active: 1995–present
- Spouse: Pablo Larraín (m. 2008; sep. 2014)
- Children: 2

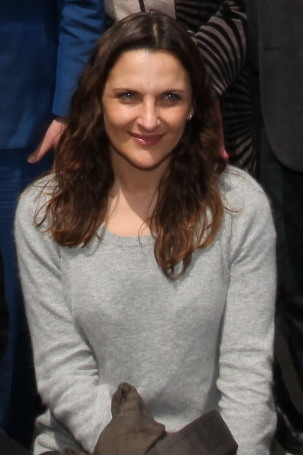
Zegers in 2013

Antonia Zegers Oportot (born 29 June 1972) is a Chilean actress. She has an extensive career in cinema, with participation in some of the most awarded Chilean films such as Tony Manero (2008), Post mortem (2010), La vida de los peces (2010), No (2012), El club (2015), A Fantastic Woman (2017), winner of the Academy Award for Best Foreign Language Film, and El Conde (2023).

== Biography and career ==
Daughter of the prominent gynecologist Fernando Zegers Hochschild and Mónica Oportot Salbach, an adventurous Buddhist photographer, she studied at the Saint George's school in Santiago and later entered the Gustavo Meza Theater School, currently the Teatro Imagen. She has a younger sister, Emilia.

She has made her career on Chilean National Television in telenovelas such as Iorana, La Fiera, Romané, Pampa Illusion, El circo de las Montini, Puertas adentro, Los Pincheira, Amor por accidente among others. She has said that her favorite soap opera roles have been Asunción in Los Pincheira and María Jacobé in Romané.

In cinema, Antonia Zegers made her debut in 1995, in the film by Christine Lucas En tu casa a las ocho. Since then, she has participated in a dozen films, among them, in almost all of Pablo Larraín's and also in those of some other well-known Chilean directors, such as Matías Bize or Marialy Rivas. She was awarded the Havana Star Prize for Best Actress by the 19th Havana Film Festival New York for her work in Los Perros.

Among the plays in which she has acted stand out Provincia Kapital, Pecados, Madre, Numancia and Fin del eclipse.

== Personal life ==
She was in a relationship with actor Ricardo Fernández between 2001 and 2004.

She met the film maker and director Pablo Larraín in 2006, and they got married in 2008. They have been separated since the end of 2014. The couple has two children.

== Selected filmography ==
Year	Title	Role	Notes
2008	Tony Manero	TV producer	
2010	Post Mortem	Nancy Puelma	
2010	The Life of Fish		
2013	No	Verónica Carvajal	
2015	The Club	Madre Mónica	
2015	The Memory of Water		
2016	You'll Never Be Alone		
2016	Neruda		
2016	No Filter		
2017	A Fantastic Woman		
2019–20	Dignity	Pamela Rodríguez	
2022	Cosmic Dawn	Elyse	
2022	The Punishment	Ana	
2023	El Conde	Jacinta	
2024	Most People Die on Sundays (Los domingos mueren más personas)		
2024	The Exiles (Los Tortuga)	Delia	

== Accolades ==
Year	Award	Category	Work	Result	Ref.
2016	3rd Platino Awards	Best Actress	The Club	Nominated	
2018	5th Platino Awards	Best Actress	Los perros	Nominated	
2023	10th Platino Awards	Best Actress	The Punishment	Nominated	
2024	11th Platino Awards	Best Supporting Actress	El conde	Nominated	
2025	19th Sur Awards	Best Supporting Actress	Most People Die on Sundays	Nominated	
2026	40th Goya Awards	Best Actress	The Exiles	Nominated	
