= Gonzalo Valenzuela =

Chilean actor (born 1978)

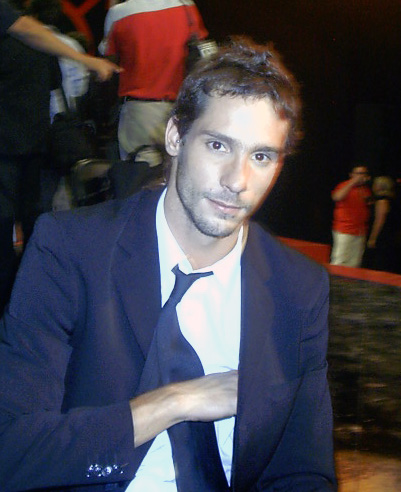
- Valenzuela in 2013
- Born: 26 January 1978 (age 47); Santiago, Chile
- Occupation: Actor
- Years active: 2001–present
- Spouse: Juana Viale (m. 2005; div. 2014)
- Children: 3

Gonzalo Valenzuela (born 26 January 1978) is a Chilean actor. He debuted on Televisión Nacional de Chile with a small guest appearance, after which he moved to Canal 13, where he further developed his TV career. He also starred in Argentine telenovelas. In 2013, he returned to Televisión Nacional to star in the telenovela Socias. He is partner and founder, along with Benjamin Vicuña, of the Centro Cultural Mori of the city of Santiago.

== Filmography ==
Key
†	Denotes works that have not yet been released

=== Film ===
Year	Title	Role	Notes
2002	Fragmentos urbanos	Clemente	
2003	XS: The Worst Size	El "Máquina" Miranda	
2005	In Bed	Bruno	
2007	Normal con alas	Bautista González	
2009	Perfidia		Short film
2009	Nunca estuviste tan adorable		Short film
2012	Sal	Héctor	Short film
2013	Olvídame		
2013	Todos contentos	Javi	
2015	The Club	Gonzalo	

=== Television ===
Year	Title	Role	Notes
2001	Piel canela	Bruno Montenegro	
2003	Machos	Adán Mercader	
2004	Hippie	Cristóbal Plaza	
2004	Tentación	Adán Mercader	
2005	Doble vida	Álex Casanova	
2005	El tiempo no para	Ignacio Ferrari	
2006	Montecristo	Santiago Díaz	
2007	Lola	Diego Martínez	
2008	Mala Conducta	Nataniel Bello	
2009–2010	Botineras	Nino Paredes	
2011	Un año para recordar	Mariano Ocampo	
2012	Soltera otra vez	Santiago Schmidt	
2012–2013	Sos mi hombre	Alejo "Cheto" Correa	
2013	Socias	Álvaro Cárdenas	Main role
2014	No abras la puerta	Juan Pablo Olavarría Jarpa	Main role
2015	Papá a la deriva	Bruno Montt	Main protagonist
2017	Las estrellas	Manuel	
2018	Si yo fuera rico	Miguel "Micky" Zunino	
2019–2020	Yo soy Lorenzo	Felipe Montreal	
2020	Historias de cuarentena	Felipe Ruíz	
2021	Demente	Emiliano Bentancourt	
TBA	Planners †	Marcos	
