= El Conde (film) =

2023 film by Pablo Larraín

- Netflix release poster
- Directed by: Pablo Larraín
- Written by: Pablo Larraín; Guillermo Calderón
- Produced by: Pablo Larraín; Juan de Dios Larraín; Rocío Jadue
- Starring: Jaime Vadell; Gloria Münchmeyer; Alfredo Castro; Paula Luchsinger
- Cinematography: Edward Lachman
- Edited by: Sofía Subercaseaux
- Production company: Fábula
- Distributed by: Netflix
- Release dates: August 31, 2023 (Venice); September 7, 2023 (Chile); September 15, 2023 (Netflix)
- Running time: 110 minutes
- Country: Chile
- Languages: Spanish; English; French

El Conde (lit. 'The Count') is a 2023 Chilean black comedy horror film directed by Pablo Larraín and written by Larraín and Guillermo Calderón. It is a satire that portrays Chilean dictator Augusto Pinochet as a 250-year-old vampire seeking death. The film stars Jaime Vadell, Gloria Münchmeyer, Alfredo Castro, and Paula Luchsinger.

El Conde premiered at the 80th Venice International Film Festival on 31 August 2023 where it won the best Screenplay Award. It was released on Netflix on 15 September 2023, four days after the 50th anniversary of the 1973 coup d'etat, in which Pinochet seized power. The film received an Academy Award nomination for Best Cinematography.

== Plot ==
In the late 1780s, Claude Pinoche, a royalist French soldier, is discovered to be a vampire and survives an attempt to kill him. Witnessing the French Revolution and the execution of Marie Antoinette, he fakes his death and flees abroad, participating in the fights against the revolutions in Haiti, Russia, and Algeria. Eventually, he ends up in Chile in 1935 and joins the Chilean Army under the name Augusto Pinochet. Rising to become a general, he overthrows the socialist government of Salvador Allende in 1973 and becomes the country's dictator, demanding that he be addressed as "The Count" by his family. When authorities begin investigating his ill-gotten wealth and human rights abuses after he leaves office, he fakes his death again and retires to a remote farm.

After more than 250 years of existence, he gradually loses his will to live, worrying his wife Lucía, and his long-time butler, Fyodor, whom Pinochet turned into a vampire in gratitude for his service during the dictatorship. Fyodor takes up Augusto's military uniform and goes on a gruesome killing spree to find and consume human hearts in Santiago. Thinking that their father was responsible and anxious to receive their inheritance, the Pinochet children hire a nun, Carmen, to exorcise and kill Augusto under the guise of auditing the family's wealth, and go to the farm, followed by Carmen, who charms Augusto with her fluency in French. Augusto later discovers that Fyodor is having an affair with Lucía but tolerates it as he has grown tired of her. Carmen extensively interviews the household over their legal troubles and finances, assembling a dossier which she hides in her room.

Carmen eventually reveals her true identity as a nun to Augusto and tries to exorcise him, but is overwhelmed by his presence and ends up having sexual intercourse with him, allowing him to transform her into a vampire. This prompts the arrival of Margaret Thatcher, who is revealed to be Claude's mother; she abandoned him at an orphanage at birth after she was raped and turned by a strigoi, whom she killed in revenge.

Margaret, incensed by Carmen's claims to Augusto's love, orders her son to kill her. Instead, Augusto shows off his wealth to Carmen, whereupon Carmen reveals that she has been feigning her attraction to him, and that her becoming a vampire was part of her mission on behalf of the Catholic Church to infiltrate the Pinochets and gather information on their corrupt dealings. As she flees, she is captured and guillotined by Fyodor, who burns her dossier. Fyodor, Lucía, and the Pinochet children then attempt to kill Augusto and Margaret to gain their inheritance, but Augusto kills Lucía by driving a stake through her heart and beheads Fyodor with a saw.

The children are left to salvage what they can of the farm. As they leave, a group of nuns arrive to look over the now emptied property. Augusto and Margaret rejuvenate themselves with vampire hearts and leave to start a new life. Augusto, now a boy, chooses to remain in Chile, saying more leftists will emerge.

== Cast ==
- Jaime Vadell as Augusto Pinochet
  - Clemente Rodríguez as Claude Pinoche
- Gloria Münchmeyer as Lucía Hiriart
- Alfredo Castro as Fyodor Krasnov
- Paula Luchsinger as Carmen
- Catalina Guerra as Luciana
- Marcial Tagle as Aníbal
- Amparo Noguera as Mercedes
- Diego Muñoz as Manuel
- Antonia Zegers as Jacinta
- Stella Gonet as Margaret Thatcher
  - Sofía Maluk as young Margaret Roberts
- Eyal Meyer as rugby player

== Production ==
Principal photography began on June 24, 2022.

== Release ==
El Conde premiered at the 80th Venice International Film Festival on 31 August 2023. It received a limited theatrical release on September 7, 2023, in Chile and Argentina. It received a limited theatrical release in the US on September 8, 2023, before it began streaming worldwide on September 15, 2023 on Netflix.

== Reception ==
On Rotten Tomatoes, El Conde holds an approval rating of 83%, based on 117 critic reviews with an average rating of 7/10. The website's critical consensus reads, "A darkly delirious satire rooted in real-life horror, El Conde finds Pablo Larraín revisiting familiar themes without losing their provocative power." On Metacritic, the film holds a weighted average score of 72 out of 100, based on 30 critics, indicating "generally favorable reviews".

Lindsey Bahr of AP News wrote "El Conde might stretch its gimmicky premise a little past its welcome, but it is an intoxicating, overwhelming and gruesome cinematic experience nonetheless."

=== Accolades ===
Organization	Date of ceremony	Category	Recipient(s)	Result	Ref.
Venice Film Festival	9 September 2023	Golden Lion	Pablo Larraín	Nominated	
Venice Film Festival	9 September 2023	Golden Osella for Best Screenplay	Guillermo Calderón and Pablo Larraín	Won	
Camerimage	18 November 2023	Silver Frog	Edward Lachman	Won	
IndieWire Critics Poll	11 December 2023	Best Cinematography	Edward Lachman	8th Place	
American Society of Cinematographers	3 March 2024	Theatrical Feature Film	Edward Lachman	Nominated	
Academy Awards	10 March 2024	Best Cinematography	Edward Lachman	Nominated	
Platino Awards	20 April 2024	Best Director	Pablo Larraín	Nominated	
Platino Awards	20 April 2024	Best Actor	Jaime Vadell	Nominated	
Platino Awards	20 April 2024	Best Supporting Actress	Antonia Zegers	Nominated	
Platino Awards	20 April 2024	Best Screenplay	Guillermo Calderón and Pablo Larraín	Nominated	
Platino Awards	20 April 2024	Best Art Direction	Rodrigo Bazaes	Won	
Platino Awards	20 April 2024	Best Sound	Miguel Hormazábal	Nominated	
Cinema for Peace		Most Valuable Film of the Year		Nominated	
