= Aguas de oro =

- Genre: Telenovela
- Developed by: Alejandro Cabrera
- Written by: Alejandro Cabrera; Larissa Contreras; Valeria Vargas; José Fonseca
- Directed by: Patricio González; Bárbara Della Schiava
- Starring: Álvaro Rudolphy; Paola Volpato; Carolina Arregui
- Country of origin: Chile
- Original language: Spanish
- No. of seasons: 1
- No. of episodes: 147

Production
- Executive producers: Daniela Demicheli; Pablo Ávila
- Producer: Shigri Sánchez
- Camera setup: Multi-camera
- Production company: Mazal Producciones

Original release
- Network: Mega
- Release: July 30, 2025 – May 14, 2026

Aguas de oro is a Chilean telenovela created by Alejandro Cabrera. It aired on Mega from July 30, 2025 to May 14, 2026. The telenovela stars Álvaro Rudolphy, Paola Volpato and Carolina Arregui.

== Plot ==
In El Álamo, a small town in the mountains, the existence of wells with water of eternal youth is discovered. A family that has lived there for 25 years has remained young, which generates a media and tourist commotion. The place becomes the center of world attention. In the midst of the commotion, another family arrives claiming to have rights over the land and the business associated with the wells.

== Cast ==
- Álvaro Rudolphy as Carlos Ruiz-Tagle
- Paola Volpato as Mariana Rioseco
- Carolina Arregui as Karla Ruiz-Tagle
- Héctor Noguera as Ernesto Ruiz-Tagle
- Loreto Valenzuela as Victoria Sarmiento
- Claudio Arredondo as Remigio Soto
- Claudia Pérez as Aurora Pereira
- Magdalena Müller as Paz Ruiz-Tagle
- Nicolás Oyarzún as Miguel Young
- Josefina Fiebelkorn as Laura Ruiz-Tagle
- Francisco Puelles as Lautaro Gamboa
- Ingrid Cruz as Salomé Bello
- Vivianne Dietz as Ayelén Gamboa
- Andrew Bargsted as Braulio Soto
- Constanza Araya as Carola Soto
- Francisco Ossa as Franklin Arancibia

== Production ==
Filming of the telenovela began on 28 May 2025.

== Ratings ==
Season	Episodes	First aired		Last aired	
Season	Episodes	Date	Rating (millions)	Date	Rating (millions)
1	147	July 30, 2025	1.40	May 14, 2026	0.82
