= The Club (2015 film) =

2015 Chilean drama film

- Theatrical release poster
- Directed by: Pablo Larraín
- Written by: Guillermo Calderón; Pablo Larraín; Daniel Villalobos
- Produced by: Juan de Dios Larraín; Pablo Larraín
- Starring: Alfredo Castro; Antonia Zegers; Roberto Farías; Jaime Vadell; Alejandro Goic; Alejandro Sieveking; Marcelo Alonso; José Soza; Francisco Reyes
- Cinematography: Sergio Armstrong
- Edited by: Sebastián Sepúlveda
- Music by: Carlos Cabezas
- Production company: Fábula
- Release dates: 9 February 2015 (Berlin); 28 May 2015 (Chile)
- Running time: 97 minutes
- Country: Chile
- Language: Spanish
- Box office: $483,222

The Club (Spanish: El Club) is a 2015 Chilean drama film directed, co-produced and co-written by Pablo Larraín. It was screened in the main competition of the 65th Berlin International Film Festival where it won the Jury Grand Prix. It was selected as the Chilean entry for the Best Foreign Language Film at the 88th Academy Awards but it was not nominated.

== Plot ==
Four retired Catholic priests share a secluded house on the outskirts of a small Chilean beach town under the supervision of a vigilant female caretaker who used to be a nun. The four men are there to discreetly purge their alleged sins and crimes, including child abuse, baby-snatching for adoptions, and whistleblowing. They are not permitted to mingle with the townsfolk and are only allowed out during early morning and late night. Their only hobby is breeding a racing dog and entering competitions. Their routine changes when a new priest arrives, and a victim of his child abuse follows him, leading the priest to commit suicide. Subsequently, a new spiritual director arrives, disrupting their lives and routine.

== Cast ==
- Alfredo Castro as Padre Vidal
- Roberto Farías as Sandokan
- Antonia Zegers as Madre Mónica
- Marcelo Alonso as Padre García
- Alejandro Goic as Padre Ortega
- Jaime Vadell as Padre Silva
- Alejandro Sieveking as Padre Ramírez
- José Soza as Padre Lazcano
- Francisco Reyes as Padre Alfonso
- Gonzalo Valenzuela as Gonzalo, surfer 1
- Diego Muñoz as Diego, surfer 2
- Catalina Pulido as Cata, surfer girl
- Paola Lattus as fishseller

== Reception ==
The film was well received, with The Guardian giving it five stars and said Pablo Larraín was "at his most masterful". Variety called it "an original and brilliantly acted chamber drama in which Larrain’s fiercely political voice comes through as loud and clear as ever".

On Rotten Tomatoes, the film has an 88% score based on 89 reviews, with an average rating of 7.86/10. The site's consensus states: "The Club finds director Pablo Larraín continuing to pose difficult questions while exploring weighty themes -- and getting the most out of a talented cast." Metacritic reports a 73 out of 100 score based on 26 reviews, indicating "generally favorable reviews".

== Awards ==
| Year | Award | Category | Recipient | Result | Ref. |
|---|---|---|---|---|---|
| 2015 | 65th Berlin International Film Festival | Golden Bear | Pablo Larraín | Nominated | |
| 2015 | 65th Berlin International Film Festival | Silver Bear Grand Jury Prize | Pablo Larraín | Won | |
| 2015 | 73rd Golden Globe Awards | Best Foreign Language Film | The Club | Nominated | |
| 2016 | Apolo Awards | Best Film | The Club | Nominated | |
| 2016 | Apolo Awards | Best Director | Pablo Larraín | Won | |
| 2016 | Apolo Awards | Best Original Screenplay | Guillermo Calderón, Pablo Larraín and Daniel Villalobos | Nominated | |
| 2016 | Apolo Awards | Best Editing | Sebastián Sepúlveda | Nominated | |
| 2016 | Apolo Awards | Best Sound | Miguel Hormazábal, Roberto Zuñiga, Ivo Moraga, Salomé Román and Mauricio Molina | Nominated | |
| 2016 | Apolo Awards | Best Supporting Actor | Roberto Farías | Won | |
| 2016 | Apolo Awards | Best Supporting Actor | Alfredo Castro | Nominated | |
| 2016 | Apolo Awards | Best Ensemble Cast | Roberto Farías, Antonia Zegers, Alfredo Castro, Alejandro Goic, Alejandro Sieveking, Jaime Vadell and Marcelo Alonso | Nominated | |

== See also ==
- Cinema of Chile
- List of submissions to the 88th Academy Awards for Best Foreign Language Film
- List of Chilean submissions for the Academy Award for Best Foreign Language Film
