= No abras la puerta =

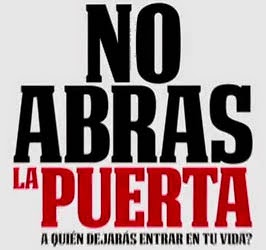
- Genre: Drama
- Created by: Julio Rojas
- Written by: Alejandro Cabrera; Emilia Noguera; Valeria Vargas; Luis Emilio Guzmán
- Directed by: Ítalo Galleani
- Creative director: Alex Bowen
- Starring: Luz Valdivieso; Matías Oviedo; Gonzalo Valenzuela; Elisa Zulueta; Marcial Tagle; Alejandra Fosalba; María José Illanes; Fernando Kliche; Magdalena Max-Neef; Javiera Hernández
- Theme music composer: Ella
- Composer: Celeste Shaw
- Country of origin: Chile
- Original language: Spanish
- No. of episodes: 74

Production
- Executive producer: Javiera Kri Amar
- Producer: Mauricio Campos
- Production locations: Santiago, Chile
- Editor: César Soto L.
- Production company: Televisión Nacional de Chile

Original release
- Network: TVN
- Release: August 4, 2014 – January 14, 2015

Related
- Vuelve temprano; Dueños del paraíso

No abras la puerta (English: Don't open the door) is a 2014 Chilean telenovela produced, and currently being broadcast, by TVN.

Luz Valdivieso and Matías Oviedo were cast as the leading roles, while Gonzalo Valenzuela plays the antagonist.

== Plot ==
Some years ago, Isabel Tobar suffered and survived violence and mistreatment from her ex-boyfriend, Juan Pablo Olavarria. After leaving him, she put herself back together and became a confident woman. She now helps and defends women who are going through the same abuse she once endured.

She does not allow time for love in her life, but she does have time for her beloved daughter Jacinta, whom she protects with all her might. Even though she is not looking for love, she eventually meets Tomás, a handsome Kung Fu instructor who falls for Isabel. However, Juan Pablo Olavarría, her ex-boyfriend, is back in Chile and is determined to find Isabel and win her back.

Isabel must choose between Juan Pablo, who appears to have changed, and Tomás, who is portrayed as caring and affectionate. She also learns about the experiences of several couples who have attempted to resolve conflicts and maintain their relationships.

== Cast ==
Confirmed on June 17, 2014.

- Luz Valdivieso as Isabel Tobar Vidal
- Gonzalo Valenzuela as Juan Pablo Olavarria
- Matías Oviedo as Tomás Campos
- Elisa Zulueta as Silvana Bunivic
- Fernando Kliche as Germán Tobar
- Magdalena Max-Neef as María Teresa Vidal de Tobar
- Marcial Tagle as Claudio Gormaz
- María José Illanes as Daniela Sepúlveda
- Alejandra Fosalba as Carla Marambio
- Javiera Hernández as Laura Olavarria
- Claudia Pérez as Rosario Vega de García
- Víctor Montero as Antonio Garcia - Villain
- Delfina Guzmán as Victoria Edwards
- Verónica Soffia as Ignacia Tobar Vidal
- Diego Ruiz as Martín Vial - Villain
- Camila Hirane as Dominga Velasco
- Felipe Orellana as Rodrigo Campos
- María Luisa Mayol as Soledad Vivanco
- María de los Ángeles López as Jacinta Olavarria Tobar / Jacinta Spencer Tobar
- Franco Latorre as Antonio Garcia Vega Jr.
- Carolina Arregui as Gladys Ortiz
- Camila Leyva as Mercedes "Meche" Vivanco
- Max Meriño as Isabel's Chief
- Matías Stevens as Robert Spencer
