= Papá en apuros =

- Genre: Telenovela
- Based on: Papá a la deriva by Daniella Castagno
- Written by: Luis del Prado; Mariana Silva
- Directed by: Víctor Huerta González; Gerardo Herrera
- Creative directors: Guillermo Isa; Diana Solís
- Starring: Juan Carlos Rey de Castro; Luciana Blomberg; José Miguel Argüelles; Paulina Bazán; Matilde León; Joaquín Escobar
- Opening theme: "Buscándote" by Mike Bahía
- Country of origin: Peru
- Original language: Spanish
- No. of seasons: 1
- No. of episodes: 134

Production
- Executive producer: Carol Ríos Polastri
- Producer: Guillermo Lay Arcos
- Editor: Mario Ching
- Camera setup: Multi-camera
- Production companies: Chasqui Producciones; Mega

Original release
- Network: Latina Televisión
- Release: 23 October 2023 – 6 May 2024

Papá en apuros is a Peruvian telenovela based on the 2015 Chilean telenovela Papá a la deriva, created by Daniella Castagno. It aired on Latina Televisión from 23 October 2023 to 6 May 2024. The series stars Juan Carlos Rey de Castro, Luciana Blomberg, José Miguel Argüelles, Paulina Bazán, Matilde León and Joaquín Escobar.

== Premise ==
Martín Seminario is a Navy frigate captain who has been widowed and is now raising his four children alone. After several years of being alone, Martín meets Julieta Olaya, with whom he begins to share new experiences and finds a new opportunity for love. However, many obstacles will prevent them from being together.

== Cast ==
- Juan Carlos Rey de Castro as Martín Seminario
- Luciana Blomberg as Julieta Olaya Segura
- Ximena Díaz as Natalia Rodríguez
- Nico Ponce as Matías "El Toyo" Quiroz Pacheco
- Denisse Dibós as Emilia Santillana
- Bruno Odar as Ramón Olaya
- Mónica Rossi as Victoria "Vicky" Pacheco
- Rodrigo Sánchez Patiño as Jorge Arrarte
- José Miguel Argüelles as Cristóbal Seminario Ferré
- Paulina Bazán as Stephanie Quiroz Pacheco
- Joaquín Escobar as Jonathan Quiroz Pacheco
- Matilde León as Luna Seminario Ferré
- Jano Baca as Elvis Tangoa
- Adriana Campos-Salazar as Bárbara Andrea "Barbie" Castro Rodríguez
- Ekaterina Konysheva as Kate Chamberline "La Gringa"
- Mariano Ramírez as Vasco Seminario Ferré
- Bianca Bazo as Marina Seminario Ferré

== Production ==
Filming of the telenovela took place from April to December 2023. The telenovela marks the beginning of Peruvian adaptations of Chilean telenovelas, culminating with the remake Pobre novio, which aired from 2024 to 2025. It also marks Latina Televisión's return to production of telenovelas, following the broadcast of Torbellino, 20 años después in 2018. Gerardo Herrera and Víctor Huerta González serve as directors, with Carol Ríos Polastri and Guillermo Lay Arcos as executive producer and general producer respectively.

== Reception ==
The telenovela premiered on 22 October 2023, positioning itself in sixth place in the audience during primetime with a percentage of 9.2 points, being surpassed by its competitors, the telenovelas Al fondo hay sitio and Perdóname, both airing on América Televisión. The Kantar Ibope Media survey placed it in fifth place in its time slot on its premiere date, reaching that position with an amount of 901,000 viewers.
