= The Punishment (2022 film) =

- Theatrical release poster
- Directed by: Matías Bize
- Written by: Coral Cruz
- Produced by: Adrián Solar
- Starring: Antonia Zegers; Nestor Cantillana
- Cinematography: Gabriel Díaz
- Edited by: Rodrigo Saquel
- Music by: Gustavo Pomenarec
- Production companies: Ceneca Producciones; Leyenda Films
- Release dates: October 6, 2022 (Chile); November 19, 2022 (PÖFF)
- Running time: 86 minutes
- Countries: Chile; Argentina
- Language: Spanish

The Punishment (Spanish: El castigo) is a 2022 drama film directed by Matías Bize and written by Coral Cruz. Starring Antonia Zegers and Nestor Cantillana. The film was named on the shortlist for Chilean's entry for the Academy Award for Best International Feature Film at the 95th Academy Awards, but it was not selected.

== Synopsis ==
Ana and Mateo search for their son after leaving him alone for a few minutes as punishment for misbehaving. Their desperate search takes them through a forest and onto a highway. Over the course of 80 minutes in real-time, the couple must confront fear, guilt, the fragility of their relationship, and the harshest revelation of all: a part of Ana hopes not to find her son, as she hasn't been happy since he was born.

== Cast ==
The actors participating in this film are:

- Antonia Zegers as Ana
- Néstor Cantillana as Mateo
- Santiago Urbina as Lucas
- Catalina Saavedra
- Yair Juri

== Production ==
Principal photography was planned to start in March 2020, but was canceled due to the COVID-19 pandemic. The start date was postponed 1 year, but it was canceled due to the same circumstances. Finally, filming began in October 2021.

== Release ==
It was released commercially on October 6, 2022, in Chilean theaters, then premiered on November 19 of the same year at the Tallinn Black Nights Film Festival. It premiered on March 31, 2023, in Spanish cinemas. It was also invited to the 27th Lima Film Festival in the Competition fiction section, where it was screened on 12 August 2023.

== Reception ==
=== Critical reception ===
Jonathan Holland from Screendaily highlights the great work of its director in bringing fluidity to the risky decision of shooting an entire movie in one take. In addition, to provide intensity to an unoriginal base story, but which ends up catching the viewer in its development.

=== Accolades ===
Year	Award / Festival	Category	Recipient	Result	Ref.
2022	Tallinn Black Nights Film Festival	Best Actress	Antonia Zegers	Won	
2022	Forqué Awards	Best Latin American Film	The Punishment	Nominated	
2022	Beijing Film Festival	Best Film	Matías Bize	Won	
2022	Beijing Film Festival	Best Actress	Antonia Zegers	Won	
2022	Fribourg International Film Festival	International competition - Grand Prix	The Punishment	Nominated	
2023	Circle of Art Critics of Chile	Best Chilean Film	The Punishment	Won	
2023	Platino Awards	Best Actress	Antonia Zegers	Nominated	
2023	Málaga Film Festival	Best Ibero-American film	The Punishment	Nominated	
2023	Málaga Film Festival	Best Director	Matías Bize	Won	
2023	Caleuche Awards	Best Leading Actress	Antonia Zegers	Nominated	
2023	Caleuche Awards	Best Supporting Actor	Néstor Cantillana	Nominated	
2023	Lima Film Festival	Best Picture	The Punishment	Nominated	
2023	Lima Film Festival	Best Actress	Antonia Zegers	Won	
