= The Life of Fish =

2010 film

- Film poster
- Directed by: Matías Bize
- Written by: Matías Bize; Julio Rojas
- Produced by: Adrián Solar
- Starring: Santiago Cabrera
- Cinematography: Bárbara Álvarez
- Edited by: Javier Estévez
- Release date: 10 June 2010
- Running time: 84 minutes
- Country: Chile
- Language: Spanish

The Life of Fish (Spanish: La vida de los peces) is a 2010 Chilean drama film directed by Matías Bize. The film was selected as the Chilean entry for the Best Foreign Language Film at the 83rd Academy Awards, but didn't make the final shortlist.

The Life of Fish won the award for Best Spanish Language Foreign Film at the 25th Goya Awards.

== Plot ==
Andrés (Santiago Cabrera) has been living in Germany for 10 years. He returns to Chile to put his past behind him before settling permanently in Berlin. During his stay, he attends the birthday party of one of his friends, where he rediscovers a whole world he had stopped seeing, including Beatriz (Blanca Lewin), his great love. This reunion could change Andrés' life forever and be necessary to reveal secrets and shed light on very dark lies.

== Cast ==
- Santiago Cabrera as Andrés
- Blanca Lewin as Beatriz
- Antonia Zegers as Mariana
- Víctor Montero as Pablo
- Sebastián Layseca as Ignacio
- Juan Pablo Miranda as Roberto
- Luz Jiménez as Guille
- María Gracia Omegna as Carolina
- Alicia Rodríguez as Daniela
- Francisca Cárdenas as Maca
- Diego Fontecilla as Jorge

== See also ==
- List of submissions to the 83rd Academy Awards for Best Foreign Language Film
- List of Chilean submissions for the Academy Award for Best Foreign Language Film
