= Paula Luchsinger =

Chilean actress

- Born: Paula Luchsinger Escobar; December 24, 1994 (age 31); Santiago, Chile
- Education: Saint George's College; School of theater at Pontificia Universidad Católica de Chile
- Occupation: Actress
- Notable work: El Conde; La Jauría
- Height: (5 ft 7 in)
- Parent(s): Fernando Luchsinger; Paula Escobar
- Website: paulaluchsinger.com

Paula Luchsinger Escobar (Santiago, December 24, 1994) is a Chilean film and television actress, acclaimed for her participation in the film El Conde (2023), the series La jauría (2020) and different Chilean soap operas, including Yo soy Lorenzo (2019).

== Artistic career ==
Luchsinger studied acting at the School of Theater of the Pontificia Universidad Católica de Chile. Subsequently, she completed a degree in Aesthetics and Philosophy at the same university, and a degree in Biology of Knowledge and Human Communication at the Universidad de Chile.

During her university studies, at the age of 20 she made her television debut. She was described by Chilean actors as "one of the most promising talents of her generation". Luchsinger appeared as "a rising star" on the cover of Wiken Magazine on August 7, 2020, and on May 7, 2022, the newspaper El Mercurio described her as the Chilean "Revelation actress".

=== Television ===
==== Soap operas ====
Luchsinger´s television career began with soap operas on the Mega television network. In 2015 she participated in an episode of the soap opera Papá a la deriva. Then, she became part of the stable cast of the dramatic area of the channel. During 2016 and 2017 she participated in her first soap opera, Señores papis, in which she played Ignacia Pereira, the daughter of Francisco Melo and Francisca Imboden's characters. During 2017 and 2018 she participated in the soap opera Tranquilo papá.

During 2019 and 2020 she played Blanca's main antagonist character in the musical soap opera Yo soy Lorenzo, set in the 1960s, a role for which she had to take dance classes and study movies and TV series of the time. She performed the song "Tú serás mi baby".

In 2021 Luchsinger co-starred in the soap opera Edificio Corona. She also played an antagonistic role in Amar Profundo, playing Jeimy Contreras, a flamboyant young woman who could not stand the precariousness of the fishing village, but due to a family debt was forced to join the artisanal fishing business. For this role Luchsinger won the "Best Youth Interpretation" award at the Premios Foronovelas 2022.

In 2023 Luchsinger acted in the television series Dime con quién andas of Paramount+ and Chilevisión, playing Bruna Ayala, one of the co-starring roles.

==== Series ====
In 2019, Luchsinger appeared in two episodes of the series Los Spookys on the HBO television network. In 2020 she premiered in her first series, La jauría, a police drama produced by audiovisual production company Fábula and Fremantle for Televisión Nacional de Chile, released in Latin America and Spain by Prime Video and by HBO Max in the United States, which was included in Variety magazine as one the best international series of 2020.

For her performance in the lead role of Celeste Ibarra, she was nominated for "Breakthrough Actress" at the 2020 Produ Awards, shortlisted for "Best Female Supporting Performance" at the eighth edition of the Premios Platino, was winner of the "Best Female Supporting Performance" award of the Premios Estrella that same year, and was nominated for "Best Leading Actress" at the 2022 Premios Caleuche. She previously attended the 2019 Zurich Film Festival gala as a representative of the cast of the series. In an interview with BBC, Luchsinger highlighted that the series "breaks with several paradigms, because it stars women, and strong women. And that shows a very important change compared to television products where only men were protagonists", adding that "the series shows women demanding their rights. It is not a war against men, because feminism does not want that. It wants equal rights and that is evident throughout the chapters".

=== Cinema ===
During 2019 Luchsinger released her first film, Ema, shot in Valparaíso, directed by Pablo Larraín and produced by Fábula, where she played the supporting role of María, a role for which she had to take dance classes and dye her hair completely light blue. The film had its world premiere at the Venice International Film Festival, where it was selected to compete for the Golden Lion 2019, the main award of the Mostra. In an interview in Revista Ya of El Mercurio, Luchsinger highlighted about the people who starred in the film that "These women embody such powerful ideas as freedom and rebellion. I also feel that they are lesser explored female minds, usually associated with bad things: the strong, sensual woman is always the enemy and never the heroine, as in this case, Ema is".

In 2023, Luchsinger´s second film, El Conde, directed by Pablo Larraín, produced by Fábula and Netflix, premiered at the 80th edition of the Venice International Film Festival on August 30, 2023 and on Netflix worldwide on September 15, 2023. The film was selected to compete for the Golden Lion 2023 and won the Osella Prize for Best Screenplay . Luchsinger played the character of the nun Carmen, the main antagonist role. Her performance was well received by critics for its transcendence, the character's complex personality and demonstrated abilities, as well as its proximity to the portrayal of María Falconetti in Carl Theodor Dreyer's The Passion of Joan of Arc. Highlighting some reviews made by some of the main art and culture magazines in the United States, in which they classified Luchsinger's performance as the most notable in the film. Among these, that of film critic Anthony Lane of The New Yorker magazine, who stated that “No one in the movie makes a more striking impact than Luchsinger”; David Canfield of Vanity Fair, who explained that "The true breakout character of El Conde is Carmencita"; Bilge Ebiri of Vulture magazine, who described that Luchsinger's performance with “the character of Carmen, the nun, is fascinating"; and that of Justin Chang of the Los Angeles Times, who reported that the character of "Carmen, the movie’s most mercurial and multitasking figure". The film's director, Pablo Larraín, declared to Vanity Fair magazine that "Paula is one of the greatest artists of our language". Luchsinger attended the film's premiere on behalf of the cast at the 80th Venice International Film Festival. During the international press conference, Luchsinger commented to Variety on the importance of the work in the context of the commemoration of the 50th anniversary of the coup d'état in Chile, noting that "this is a film that can start a national conversation", adding that "there is a resurgence of the extreme right in Chile and this is a necessary film because it reminds us that Pinochet went unpunished". Likewise, on the red carpet of the film's premiere, the style and elegance of her look was highlighted by Vogue and other Chilean media. For her performance she was nominated for "Best Leading Actress" at the 2024 Caleuche Awards.

== Filmography ==
=== Soap operas ===
Year	Show	Character	Role
2015	Papá a la deriva	Felipe's friend	Extra role
2016-2017	Señores papis	Ignacia Pereira	Secondary role
2017-2018	Tranquilo papá	Madonna Poblete	Secondary role
2019	Los Espookys		Extra role
2019-2020	Yo soy Lorenzo	Blanca Noriega	Antagonist role
2020	La jauría	Celeste Ibarra	Protagonic role
2021	Edificio Corona	Catalina Manzano	Co-protagonic role
2021-2022	Amar profundo	Jeimy Contreras	Antagonist role
2023	Dime con quién andas	Bruna Ayala	Co-protagonic role

=== Cinema ===
Year	Movie	Role
2019	Ema	María
2023	El Conde	Nun Carmen

== Prizes ==
Year	Award	Category	Nominated work	Result
2020	Premios Produ	Best New Actress	La jauría	Nominated
2021	Premios Platino	Best Supporting Female Performance	La jauría	Preselected
2021	Premios Estrella	Best Supporting Female Performance	La jauría	Winner
2022	Premios Caleuche	Best Actress in a Leading Role	La jauría	Nominated
2024	Premios Caleuche	Best Actress in a Leading Role	El Conde	Nominated
