= Reunión de superados =

- Genre: Telenovela
- Developed by: Rodrigo Bastidas
- Written by: Rodrigo Bastidas; Raimundo Bastidas; Valentina Pollarolo; Ronald Heim
- Directed by: Felipe Arratia
- Starring: Mario Horton; Daniela Ramírez; Francisco Reyes; Elisa Zulueta
- Composer: Marcelo Sepúlveda
- Country of origin: Chile
- Original language: Spanish

Production
- Executive producers: Patricio López Vicuña; Vania Portilla
- Cinematography: Oscar Fuentes G.
- Editor: Nelson Valdés Valencia
- Camera setup: Multi-camera
- Production company: Mazal Producciones

Original release
- Network: Mega
- Release: September 23, 2025 – present

Reunión de superados is a Chilean telenovela created by Rodrigo Bastidas. It premiered on Mega on September 23, 2025. The telenovela stars Mario Horton, Daniela Ramírez, Francisco Reyes and Elisa Zulueta.

== Cast ==
=== Main ===
- Mario Horton as Manuel Morales
- Daniela Ramírez as Javiera Echeverría
- Francisco Reyes as Jaime Astaburuaga
- Elisa Zulueta as Teresa Astaburuaga
- Diego Muñoz as Jorge Benavides
- Ignacia Baeza as Matilde Manríquez
- Paloma Moreno as Pilar Rodríguez
- Claudio Castellón as Héctor Núñez
- Julieta Bartolomé as Alessandra Méndez
- Luz Valdivieso as Josefa Domínguez
- Álvaro Espinoza as Maximiliano Vidal
- Maricarmen Arrigorriaga as Ana
- Paulina Hunt as Nancy Campbell
- Claudio Olate as Rubén Fernández
- Nicolás Mena as Gustavo López
- Beltrán Izquierdo as Domingo Benavides
- Clara Silvera as Amanda Morales
- Amanda Milos as Ponchi Benavides
- Santiago Cendoyya as Nicolás Astaburuaga
- Isabella Gómez as Tortu Vidal
- Sergio Sepúlveda as Joaquín Morales
- Cristóbal Aramburu as Ronaldo Núñez
- Rossanny Lanza as Xiomara

=== Guest stars ===
- Shlomit Baytelman as Perla Echenique
- Carmen Disa Gutiérrez as Myriam Ramos

== Production ==
Filming of the telenovela began on 23 July 2025.

== Ratings ==
Season	Episodes	First aired		Last aired	
Season	Episodes	Date	Rating (millions)	Date	Rating (millions)
1	TBA	September 23, 2025	1.00	TBA	TBD
