= In Bed =

In Bed (En la cama)
- film poster
- Directed by: Matías Bize
- Written by: Julio Rojas
- Produced by: Adrián Solar, Christoph Meyer-Wiel
- Starring: Gonzalo Valenzuela, Blanca Lewin
- Cinematography: Gabriel Díaz, Cristián Castro
- Edited by: Paula Talloni
- Music by: Diego Fontecilla, Guido Goñi
- Distributed by: Ceneca Producciones, CMW Films (Germany)
- Release date: 2005 (Viña del Mar International Festival)
- Running time: 85 minutes
- Country: Chile
- Language: Spanish

In Bed (Spanish: En la Cama) is a 2005 Chilean erotic drama film directed by Matías Bize and starring Blanca Lewin and Gonzalo Valenzuela.

It was Chile's submission to the 79th Academy Awards for the Academy Award for Best Foreign Language Film, but was not accepted as a nominee. Nevertheless, the film garnered ten awards at various film festivals.

== Plot ==
In a Santiago motel room, two young middle-class individuals are engaged in a sexual encounter. They had met while leaving a party and don't know each other's names. As the night progresses and they continue to have sex, they eventually reveal their names to each other; he is Bruno and she is Daniela. In between their intimate moments, they share more details about their lives, their sorrows, and their fears. Bruno pretends that the woman calling him on his cellphone is his ex-girlfriend and confesses that he is moving to Belgium for postgraduate study. Daniela admits that her fiancé can be violent but she plans to marry him anyway. Their initial passion evolves into sharing confidences and even tenderness, but she insists that this will be her last fling before getting married.

== Cast ==
- Blanca Lewin as Daniela
- Gonzalo Valenzuela as Bruno

== Remake ==
The 2010 film Room in Rome is loosely based on In Bed.

== See also ==
- Cinema of Chile
- List of submissions to the 79th Academy Awards for Best Foreign Language Film
