= Hijos del desierto =

Chilean telenovela

- Genre: Telenovela
- Created by: Rodrigo Cuevas Gallegos
- Directed by: Patricio González Kuhlmann
- Starring: Jorge Arecheta; Gastón Salgado; María-José Weigel
- Country of origin: Chile
- Original language: Spanish
- No. of seasons: 1
- No. of episodes: 163

Production
- Executive producers: María Eugenia Rencoret; Patricio López; Pablo Avila
- Editor: Nelson Valdés
- Camera setup: Multi-camera
- Production companies: Mega; AGTV Producciones

Original release
- Network: Mega
- Release: August 23, 2022 – June 5, 2023

Hijos del desierto is a Chilean telenovela created by Rodrigo Cuevas Gallegos. It aired on Mega from August 23, 2022 to June 5, 2023. It stars Jorge Arecheta, Gastón Salgado and María-José Weigel.

== Cast ==
- Jorge Arecheta as Antonio Ramírez / Gaspar Sanfuentes
- Gastón Salgado as Pedro Ramírez
- María-José Weigel as Eloísa González
- Francisco Melo as Gregorio Sanfuentes
- Paola Volpato as Antonia Williams
- Marcelo Alonso as Cornellius Bormann
- Paloma Moreno as Margot Le Blanche
- Ingrid Cruz as Hermana Helena
- Claudio Arredondo as Neftalí González
- Francisca Gavilán as Ester González
- Carmen Zabala as Violeta Mondaca "La Gato"
- Fernanda Finsterbusch as Josefina Bormann
- Michael Silva
- Roberto Farías as "Panda"
- Rodrigo Soto as Hipólito Cárdenas
- Otilio Castro as Soto
- Guilherme Sepúlveda as Herr Braun
- Nahuel Cantillano as "Peineta"
- Simón Beltrán as "Piojo"
- Andrés Olea as Olegario
- Manuel Castro

== Reception ==
=== Ratings ===
Season	Episodes	First aired		Last aired	
Season	Episodes	Date	Rating (in points)	Date	Rating (in points)
1	163	August 23, 2022	20.4	June 5, 2023	21.9

=== Awards and nominations ===
Year	Award	Category	Nominated	Result	Ref
2022	Produ Awards	Best Telenovela	Hijos del desierto	Nominated	
2022	Produ Awards	Best Lead Actor - Superseries or Telenovela	Gastón Salgado	Nominated	
2022	Produ Awards	Best Supporting Actress - Superseries or Telenovela	Paola Volpato	Won	
2022	Produ Awards	Best Supporting Actor - Superseries or Telenovela	Francisco Melo	Nominated	
2022	Produ Awards	Best Supporting Actor - Superseries or Telenovela	Marcelo Alonso	Nominated	
2022	Produ Awards	Best Screenplay - Superseries or Telenovela	Rodrigo Cuevas Gallegos	Nominated	
2022	Produ Awards	Best Period Recreation	Antonietta Moles, Pedro Miranda, and Orlando Arias	Nominated	
