= Solange Lackington =

Chilean actress, director and playwright

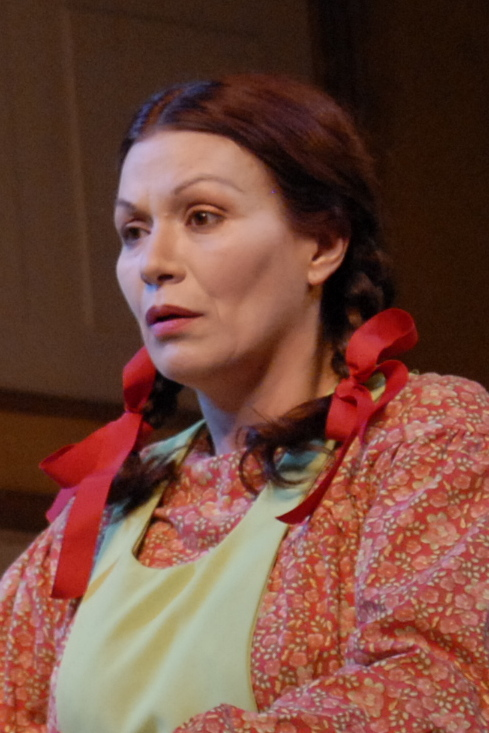
- Solange Lackington on stage in 2010
- Born: Solange Andrea Lackington Gangas; December 7, 1962 (age 63); Santiago, Chile
- Education: Pontifical Catholic University of Chile
- Occupation: Actress

Solange Lackington Gangas (born December 7, 1962) is a Chilean actress, director and playwright of film, theater and television. She studied theater at the School of Theater of the Pontifical Catholic University of Chile. At just 20 years old, she made her debut on television, acting in telenovelas such as La torre 10 (1984) and Bellas y audaces (1988), alongside figures such as Sonia Viveros, Lucy Salgado and Luis Alarcón. During this period, she collaborated with the producer Sonia Fuchs in the Dramatic Area of Televisión Nacional de Chile. She achieved great popularity by playing Estrellita on the daily series Los Venegas. However, her consecration was due to her joining the Dramatic Area of Channel 13, acting in telenovelas such as Sabor a ti, Piel canela, Machos and Brujas. In this period, she achieved a season of great awards for her work, including Apes Awards and Altazor Awards. In 2017, she assumed the title role in Edward Franklin Albee's play Who's Afraid of Virginia Woolf ?. Her performance in this play earned her positive reviews. A year later, she played Gabriela Mistral in Andrés Kalawski's Mistral, Gabriela, 1945.

== Filmography ==
=== Films ===
- Súper, todo Chile adentro (2009) – Nora
- Against the devil (2019)
- The man of the future (2019)
- Nobody Knows I'm Here (2020)

=== Telenovelas ===
Telenovelas
Year	Telenovela	Role	Channel
1984	La torre 10	Carmen Oyarce	TVN
1985	Marta a las ocho	Mónica Sanhueza	TVN
1985	Morir de amor	Rosa	TVN
1986	La Villa	Daniela Sarlegui	TVN
1988	Bellas y audaces	Lourdes Meza	TVN
1988	Las dos caras del amor	Adela García	TVN
1989	A la sombra del ángel	Rosalía	TVN
1990	El milagro de vivir	Paulina Silva	TVN
1993	Ámame	Gladys "Marilyn" Castro	TVN
1994	Rojo y miel	Valeria Cortés	TVN
1995	Juegos de fuego	Mariana Casiraghi	TVN
1996	Loca piel	Genoveva Rubio	TVN
1997	Tic Tac	Iris Valdés	TVN
1998	Marparaíso	Rita Gallegos	Canal 13
2000	Sabor a ti	Filomena Calquín	Canal 13
2001	Piel canela	Rosario "Charito" Novoa	Canal 13
2003	Machos	Josefina Urrutia	Canal 13
2004	Hippie	Hermana Ángela Hidalgo	Canal 13
2005	Brujas	Marta "Martuca" Salinas	Canal 13
2006	Descarado	Ana María Bilbao	Canal 13
2007–2008	Lola	María Teresa "Marité" Sagardía	Canal 13
2010	Martín Rivas	Bernarda Cordero	TVN
2012–2013	Soltera otra vez	Luisa Tapia	Canal 13
2014	Chipe libre	Irene Olivares	Canal 13
2015	Papá a la deriva	Victoria "Vicky" Urrutia	Mega
2016	Ámbar	Mireya Zúñiga	Mega
2018	Si yo fuera rico	Mónica Salas	Mega
2019	Juegos de poder	Beatriz Acosta	Mega
2021	Verdades ocultas	Rocío Verdugo	Mega
