= Post Mortem (2010 film) =

2010 Chilean drama film

- Directed by: Pablo Larraín
- Written by: Pablo Larraín; Mateo Iribarren
- Produced by: Juan de Dios Larraín
- Starring: Alfredo Castro; Antonia Zegers; Amparo Noguera
- Cinematography: Sergio Armstrong
- Edited by: Andrea Chignoli
- Music by: Alejandro Castaños; Juan Cristóbal Meza
- Production company: Fábula
- Release date: 5 September 2010 (Venice)
- Running time: 98 minutes
- Countries: Chile; Mexico; Germany
- Language: Spanish

Post Mortem is a 2010 drama film directed by Pablo Larraín and set during the 1973 military coup that overthrew former President Salvador Allende, inaugurating the 17-year dictatorship of Augusto Pinochet. The film competed in the 67th Venice International Film Festival, Antofagasta Film Festival, Havana Film Festival and the Guadalajara International Film Festival. The film's main character Mario Cornejo is based on a real person with the same name.

== Plot ==
Mario (Alfredo Castro) works as a pathologist's assistant in Santiago, responsible for taking down the pathologist's commentary during post-mortems. The job has given him a grey, deathly appearance. During the military coup, Mario had a love affair with a show dancer named Nancy (Antonia Zegers), who lives across the street with her younger brother David and her father, a communist and Allende supporter. On the morning of September 11, the date of the coup, a military raid takes place in Nancy's house and her brother and father are arrested. Mario embarks on a frantic search for Nancy, who has disappeared, while also facing pressure from the military to hide the true causes of death of the bodies piling up in the morgue.

== Cast ==
- Alfredo Castro - Mario Cornejo
- Antonia Zegers - Nancy Puelma (Bim Bam Bum dancer)
- Jaime Vadell - Dr. Castillo
- Amparo Noguera - Sandra
- Marcelo Alonso - Victor
- Marcial Tagle - Captain Montes
- Santiago Graffigna - David Puelma
- Ernesto Malbrán - Arturo Puelma
- Aldo Parodi - Director of Bim Bam Bum
- Adriano Castillo - comedian in Bim Bam Bum

== Cinematography ==
The film has a projected aspect ratio of 2.66:1, which is ultra-wide and very unusual. One reviewer observes that "Post Mortem's muted color scheme reflects the drab '70s world that only adds insult to injury for Pinochet’s trampled victims." With director of photography Sergio Armstrong, Larraín shot the film with Russian LOMO anamorphic lenses, the type used in the 1970s by Andrei Tarkovsky and other Russian filmmakers. The lenses are intended for 35 mm film, but Larrain shot on 16 mm film, achieving a look he describes as "very special". Larraín describes the process of lighting the film as follows:

And then when we were shooting, we were doing all kinds of lighting setups, and we never liked anything that we had. One day we had an electrical problem and all the lighting we had set up went down before we started shooting. So I asked for somebody to turn on the lights for the room, and when I looked at the monitor I realized that I really liked the idea of using very regular light coming from the ceiling, but a lot of them. We created this very plain array so the film would have this public lighting look. It also made sense because there is a certain politic to it. And after the test we realized that it actually did work because it creates such muted colors with very little shadows and we liked that. It was plain, it was grainy, and the color palette was very special. So we only used regular lightbulbs, hung up all over the set but mostly from the ceiling.

== Reception ==
The film was well-received by critics and considered further proof of Larraín’s talent, previously noted in Tony Manero. It received four stars from both The Guardian, which called it “an eerie portrait of a disturbing time” and Time Out, which praised the “humorously unconventional framings, expressively washed-out colour tones and mysterious low-key performances” that bring together “human comedy and historical tragedy to unique, and surprisingly emotional, effect.”. The New York Times critic A. O. Scott wrote that “the achievement of Post Mortem is to take rigorous and unsentimental measure of the unpleasantness”. On the review aggregator website Rotten Tomatoes, 91% of 35 critics' reviews are positive, with an average rating of 7.1/10. The website's consensus reads: "Post Mortem does an autopsy on Chilean historical tragedy and the banality of evil, distinctively conducted with a humorous stolidness that positions Larraín as a director to follow." Metacritic, which uses a weighted average, assigned the film a score of 72 out of 100, based on 14 critics, indicating "generally favorable" reviews.

== Awards ==
- Antofagasta Film Festival - Best Film
- Antofagasta Film Festival - Best Actress (Antonia Zegers)
- Havana Film Festival - Second Prize Coral
- Festival Internacional del Nuevo Cine Latinoamericano de La Habana - Best Actress (Antonia Zegers)
- Festival Internacional del Nuevo Cine Latinoamericano de La Habana - Best Actor (Alfredo Castro)
- Festival Internacional del Nuevo Cine Latinoamericano de La Habana - Best Screenplay
- Festival Internacional del Nuevo Cine Latinoamericano de La Habana - FIPRESCI Award
- Festival Internacional de Cine de Cartagena - Best Picture
- Festival Internacional de Cine de Guadalajara - Best Picture
- Festival Internacional de Cine de Guadalajara - Best Actor (Alfredo Castro)
- Festival Internacional de Cine de Guadalajara - Best Cinematography (Sergio Armstrong)

== See also ==
- Cinema of Chile
