= Marcial Tagle =

Chilean actor (born 1973)

- Born: Marcial Andrés Tagle Concha; 4 October 1973 (age 53); Santiago, Chile
- Occupation: Actor
- Spouse: Luz Valdivieso (divorced)
- Children: María, Marcial, Lucía

Marcial Andrés Tagle Concha (born 4 October 1973) is a Chilean actor.

== Biography ==
=== Early life ===
He first attended the Colegio San Ignacio El Bosque in Providencia, Santiago. He lived for many years in Spain, where he also completed his education.

He married Chilean actress Luz Valdivieso on 3 December 2005. He became a father for the first time in 2008 with the birth of his daughter María; his second child, a son named Marcial, was born in 2011; and his daughter Lucía was born in 2016. On 20 January 2022, his wife confirmed their separation on amicable terms, focusing on their love for their children.

=== Career ===
Trained as an actor in Spain—where he lived for several years—he was a founding member of the theater company La Feria. There, he served as artistic director and both directed and performed in productions such as Hojas de Parra, La Nona, Escenas de la vida conyugal and Viejos de mierda. His contributions to Chilean theater earned him the APES Award and the National Prize for Performing and Audiovisual Arts in 2019.

He became widely known for the Mega series Casado con hijos (2006), in which he played the neighbor "Pablo Pinto". The following year, he starred in the soap opera Fortunato, an adaptation of Los Roldán, and years later in the soap opera Graduados an adaptation of the series of the same name.

Tagle has appeared in over 30 films—working with directors such as Raúl Ruiz, Pablo Larraín, Sebastián Lelio and Andrés Wood — and has recently starred in movies including 1976 (2022), Malcriados (2023), El Conde (2023) and The Red Hangar (2026).

In 2012, he appeared alongside his partner, Luz Valdivieso, in a social media video for Andrés Velasco's presidential campaign as part of the "I Support Him" ("Yo sí, lo apoyo") segment.

In films, he has appeared in several Pablo Larraín works as a supporting actor.

== Filmography ==
=== Films ===
Film
Year	Film	Character	Director
2005	Play	Vargas	Alicia Scherson
2006	Padre Nuestro	José "Pepe"	Rodrigo Sepúlveda
2006	Fuga	Miguel Recabarren	Pablo Larraín
2007	Life Kills Me	Javier	Sebastián Silva
2008	Doll	Manuel	Sebastián Arrau
2009	Super, todo chile adentro	Jaime	Fernanda Aljaro y Felipe del Río
2010	Post Mortem	Militar	Pablo Larraín
2010	Fuck My Life	Mario Alcázar	Nicolás López
2011	Violeta Went to Heaven	Fernando Castillo Velasco	Andrés Wood
2012	Bahía Azul	Raúl	Nicolás Acuña
2012	No	Alberto Arancibia	Pablo Larraín
2013	Gloria		Sebastián Lelio
2013	Aftershock	Reo	Nicolás López
2013	El derechazo	Andrés Mallamand	Lalo Prieto
2013	Barrio universitario		Esteban Vidal
2015	El bosque de Karadima	Andrés Artiaga	Matías Lira
2015	Alma	Pablo	Diego Rougier
2015	In the Grayscale	Schulz	Claudio Marcone
2017	Neruda		Pablo Larraín
2017	A Fantastic Woman	Familiar de Orlando	Sebastián Lelio
2017	La memoria de mi padre		Rodrigo Bacigalupe
2017	Ángel de la muerte		Florencia Mellado
2018	El Taller		José Tomás Videla
2018	No estoy loca		Nicolás López
2019	Hecho bolsa	Manager	Felipe Izquierdo
2020	Cosas de hombres		Gabriela Sobarzo
2022	1976	Osvaldo	Manuela Martelli
2022	S.O.S. Mamis: La película	Andrés	Gabriela Sobarzo
2023	El Conde	Aníbal Pinochet	Pablo Larraín
2024	In Her Place	Aliro Veloso	Maite Alberdi
2026	The Red Hangar		Juan Pablo Sallato

=== Television ===
Series
Year	Series	Character	Channel
2004-2005	BKN	Señor Valdivieso	Mega
2006	JPT: Justicia para todos	Manuel Rivera	TVN
2006-2008 2023	Casado con hijos	Pablo Eugenio Pinto	Mega
2008	Mandiola & Compañía	Mauro Amenábar	Mega
2008	Búscate la vida	Renzo	Mega
2009-2011	Otra vez papá	Jerónimo Campino	Mega
2010	Algo habrán hecho por la historia de Chile	Bernardo O'Higgins	TVN
2010	Adiós al séptimo de línea	Patricio Lynch	Mega
2010-2011	La Colonia	Bernardo Del Río	Mega
2012	Cobre: Historia de una nación	Ignacio Larrea	Mega
2016	Bala Loca	Julián Torres	CHV
2017	Papá Mono	Rodrigo Meneses	El 13
2017	62: Historia de un mundial	Carlos Dittborn	TVN
2017	Ramona	Dionisio Cruz	TVN
2019	Héroes Invisibles	Luis Salinas	CHV
2023	Los mil días de Allende	Patricio Aylwin	TVN
2024	Vencer o morir	General Salas	Prime Video
2025	Baby Bandito	Genesis father	Netflix
2026	The House of the Spirits	Father Antonio	Prime Video

Telenovelas
Year	Title	Character	Channel
2004	Hippie	Roberto Manríquez	El 13
2004	Ídolos	Peter Prado	TVN
2005	Los Capo	Constantino Massone	TVN
2006	Entre Medias	Rafael Valdés	TVN
2007	Fortunato	Fortunato Cuevas	Mega
2013	Graduados	Andrés Jalifa	CHV
2014	No abras la puerta	Claudio Gómez	TVN
2018	Soltera otra vez 3	Iván Ramírez	El 13
2019	Río oscuro	Custodio Pereira	El 13
2021	La torre de Mabel	Valerio Moya	El 13
