= The Memory of Water (film) =

- Directed by: Matías Bize
- Written by: Matías Bize; Julio Rojas
- Produced by: Adrián Solar
- Starring: Elena Anaya; Benjamín Vicuña
- Cinematography: Arnaldo Rodríguez
- Music by: Diego Fontecilla
- Release date: August 27, 2015
- Country: Chile
- Language: Spanish

The Memory of Water (Spanish: La memoria del agua) is a 2015 Chilean drama film written and directed by Matías Bize. It was screened in the Venice Days section at the 72nd Venice International Film Festival. It won the Colón de Oro for best director at the 2015 Festival de Cine Iberoamericano de Huelva.

== Plot ==
Amanda (played by Elena Anaya) and Javier (played by Benjamín Vicuña) separate after the death of their son. Each of them tries to rebuild their life in their own way: she through grief, and he through escapism. Together, they embark on a journey that could bring them back together as a couple, but they also come to realize that love alone is not enough to overcome the tragedy they have experienced.

== Cast ==
- Elena Anaya as Amanda
- Benjamín Vicuña as Javier
- Néstor Cantillana as Marcos
- Sergio Hernández as Pedro
- Silvia Marty as Mónica
- Etienne Bobenrieth - Hernán
- Antonia Zegers as Pamela
- Alba Flores as Carmen
- Pablo Cerda as Jonás
