= Dama y obrero (Chilean TV series) =

Chilean television series

- Genre: Telenovela
- Directed by: María Eugenia Rencoret; Claudio López de Lérida
- Starring: María Gracia Omegna; Francisco Pérez-Bannen; César Sepúlveda; Elisa Zulueta; Magdalena Max-Neef
- Opening theme: Lágrimas de amor by Américo
- Country of origin: Chile
- Original language: Spanish
- No. of episodes: 190 (final)

Original release
- Network: TVN
- Release: June 11, 2012 – March 8, 2013

Related
- Esperanza; Solamente Julia; Dama y obrero (2013)

Dama y obrero (English: Lady and Worker) is a Chilean telenovela produced and broadcast by Televisión Nacional de Chile. It premiered on June 11, 2012 on TVN and June 12 on TV Chile.

== Cast ==
- María Gracia Omegna as Ignacia Villavicencio
- Francisco Pérez-Bannen as Julio Ulloa
- César Sepúlveda as Tomás Ahumada
- Elisa Zulueta as Mireya Ledesma
- Magdalena Max-Neef as Engracia Hurtado
- Delfina Guzmán as Alfonsina Cardemil
- Edgardo Bruna as Mariano Villavicencio
- Josefina Velasco as Gina Ulloa
- Carmen Disa Gutiérrez as Margarita Ulloa
- Gabriel Prieto as Olegario Ledesma
- Emilio Edwards as Christopher "Neto" Lara
- Santiago Tupper as José Manuel Ortúzar
- Nicolás Oyarzún as Rubén Villavicencio
- Silvana Salgueiro as Irene Ulloa
- Daniela Palavecino as Trinidad Santada

=== Special participations ===
- Erto Pantoja as Ramón Molina
- Francisca Hurtado as Olga "Olguita"
- Claudia Hidalgo as Cecilia Flores

== Versions ==
- An American remake of this telenovela produced by Telemundo and it stars Ana Layevska, José Luis Reséndez and Fabián Ríos.

== See also ==
- Televisión Nacional de Chile
