= Socias =

- Also known as: El éxito tiene su precio
- Directed by: Patricio González K. María Eugenia Rencoret
- Starring: María Elena Swett; Gonzalo Valenzuela; Paola Volpato; Marcelo Alonso; Elisa Zulueta; Álvaro Morales; Mayte Rodríguez; Mauricio Pesutic
- Opening theme: Mi Enfermedad by Fabiana Cantilo
- Country of origin: Chile
- Original language: Spanish
- No. of episodes: 116

Production
- Producers: Patricio López V. Yanara Salfate Kaune
- Production company: TVN

Original release
- Network: TVN
- Release: June 3, 2013 – January 6, 2014

Related
- Separados; Vuelve temprano

Socias is a Chilean telenovela originally aired on TVN based on the Argentine telenovela of the same name produced by Pol-ka Producciones.

== Cast ==
=== Main cast ===
- María Elena Swett as Inés Ventura
- Paola Volpato as Monserrat Silva
- Elisa Zulueta as Dolores Montt
- Gonzalo Valenzuela as Álvaro Cárdenas
- Mauricio Pesutic as Ricardo Ossandón
- Marcelo Alonso as Federico Ibáñez
- Nicolás Oyarzún as Mariano Rivas
- Álvaro Morales as Pablo Ventura
- Carmen Gloria Bresky as Catalina Díaz
- Mayte Rodríguez as Antonia del Solar
- Delfina Guzmán as Mercedes "Meme" Valdés
- Julio Jung Jr. as Octavio Acuña
- Diego Ruiz as Germán Ossandón
- Jacqueline Boudon as Elvira Rojas
- Otilio Castro as Julito Faúndez
- ¿? as Berta Flores
- Sebastián Contreras as Cristóbal Solé
- Antonia Zilleruelo as Valentina Acuña
- Mateo Montero as Mateo Ibáñez
- María Elisa Vial as Sofía Ventura

=== Supporting cast ===
- Willy Semler as Rubén Schuster
- Liliana García as Bernardita Risopatrón
- Javiera Hernández as Verónica Tagle
- Marcela del Valle as Claudia Riesco
- Rodrigo Bastidas as Padre O'Connor
- Elena Muñoz as Paula Vásquez
- Claudio Valenzuela as Javier Rodríguez
- Sebastián Arrigorriaga as Damián
- Marina Salcedo as Laurita
- Gino Costa como Periodista
- Eyal Meyer as Arturo

== See also ==
- Televisión Nacional de Chile
