= Edificio Corona =

- Genre: Telenovela
- Created by: Daniella Castagno; Rodrigo Bastidas
- Written by: Daniella Castagno; Rodrigo Bastidas; Elena Muñoz; Milena Bastidas
- Directed by: Nicolás Alemparte; Víctor Huerta
- Starring: Francisco Melo; María Gracia Omegna; Nicolás Oyarzún; Fernando Godoy; Mario Horton
- Opening theme: "Me enamoré de ti" by Iván Alejandro
- Country of origin: Chile
- Original language: Spanish
- No. of seasons: 1
- No. of episodes: 120

Production
- Executive producers: Daniela Demicheli; Pablo Díaz
- Producer: Patricia Encina
- Camera setup: Multi-camera
- Production companies: Mega; DDRío Estudios

Original release
- Network: Mega
- Release: January 11 – August 9, 2021

Edificio Corona is a Chilean telenovela created by Daniella Castagno and Rodrigo Bastidas for Mega. It aired from January 11, 2021 to August 9, 2021. It stars Francisco Melo, María Gracia Omegna, Nicolás Oyarzún, Fernando Godoy, and Mario Horton.

The telenovela takes place in an apartment building where a group of residents must do a rigorous quarantine after a neighbor is diagnosed with COVID-19.

== Cast ==
- Francisco Melo as Sergio Correa
- Paola Volpato as Ágata Cárdenas
- María Gracia Omegna as Javiera Sandoval Fernández
- Nicolás Oyarzún as Pablo Arancibia
- Fernando Godoy as Carlos González
- Mario Horton as Germán Manzano
- Vivianne Dietz as Rubí Cárdenas
- Hitzka Nudelman as Macarena Correa
- Josefina Fiebelkorn as Soledad Montané
- Dayana Amigo as Carolina Olmedo
- Pedro Campos as Julián Sánchez
- Paula Luchsinger as Catalina Manzano
- Magdalena Müller as Esmeralda Cárdenas
- Max Salgado as Miguel Sánchez
- María Elena Duvauchelle as Teresa "Telele" Fernández
- Simón Beltrán as Felipe "Pipe" Arancibia Montané
- Helen Mrugalski as Josefa Correa
- Matías Bielostotzky as Miguel Sánchez Miranda
- Claudio Arredondo as Renato Carrasco
- Jorge Arecheta as Tomás Jofré
- Gabriel Cañas as Benjamín
- Yamila Reyna as María Mercedes "La Meche"
- Jacqueline Boudon as Rosa Fuenzalida
- Mireya Sotoconil as Zulema Fuenzalida
- Diego Gabarró as Nicolás
- Barbara Rios as Rocío
- Catalina de la Cerda as Petu
- Isidora Rebolledo as Paloma
- Josefina Velasco as Mireya
- Christian Zúñiga as César Sánchez
- Fernanda Finsterbusch as María José "Cote" Miranda
- Otilio Castro as Pastor Aurelio Cifuentes
- Roxana Naranjo as Elcira
- Felipe Zambrano as Nicanor Cifuentes
- Piamaría Silva as Nicole
- Daniela Castillo as Jacinta
- Paulina Hunt as Edith
- Hugo Vásquez as Tomás
- Elizabeth Torres as Marta Gutiérrez
- Daniel Morera as Cristián

== Ratings ==
Season	Episodes	First aired		Last aired	
Season	Episodes	Date	Rating (in points)	Date	Rating (in points)
1	120	March 15, 2021	21	August 19, 2021	21.8
