= Marcelo Alonso =

Chilean actor

Marcelo Alejandro Alonso Claro
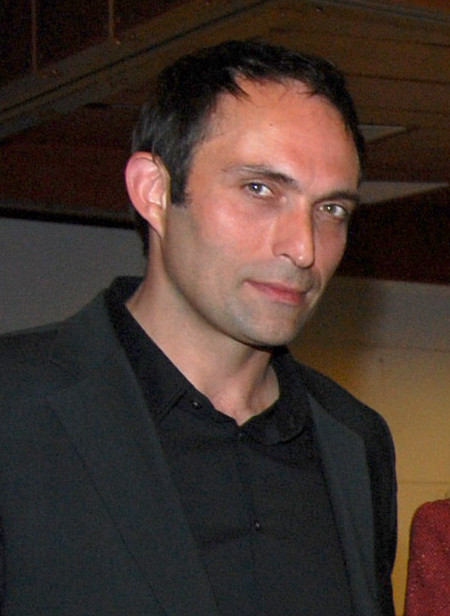
- Marcelo Alonso in 2010
- Born: 19 March 1969 (age 57); Santiago, Chile
- Occupation: Actor
- Years active: 1993–present

Marcelo Alejandro Alonso Claro (born 19 March 1969) is a Chilean actor and theater director.

Alonso has a degree in Acting from the Theater Department of the Faculty of Arts of the University of Chile. In 1994, he debuted in the Champaña television series on Channel 13, however they were only recurring appearances. In 2004 he joined the cast of the evening television series Los Pincheira, and since that year he has established himself as a stable actor within the television series of the Dramatic Area of TVN. Since 2015, he has starred in the productions La poseída, El camionero (2016) and Wena profe (2017). In theater, he has been part of the cast of "Casa de Muñecas" by Henrik Ibsen, "Pelo negro, boca arriba" by Rodrigo Bazaes and "Un Roble" by Tim Crouch, among other works; as theater director he has been in charge of the first version of "Las brutas" by Juan Radrigán and "Madame de Sade" by Yukio Mishima.

== Filmography ==
=== Films ===
Films
year	Title	Role	Director
2008	Tony Manero	Rumano	Pablo Larraín
2008	Secretos	Radomiro Topic	Valeria Sarmiento
2009	Turistas	Joel	Alicia Scherson
2010	Post mortem	Víctor	Pablo Larraín
2011	03:34 Terremoto en Chile	Manuel	Juan Pablo Ternicier
2011	La mujer de Iván	Iván	Francisca Silva
2012	Bombal	Eulogio Sánchez	Marcelo Ferrari
2012	Caleuche	José Borquéz	Jorge Olguín
2014	La danza de la realidad	Nazi boss	Alejandro Jodorowsky
2015	El club	Padre García	Pablo Larraín
2016	Princesita	Miguel	Marialy Rivas
2016	Neruda	Pepe Rodríguez	Pablo Larraín
2018	Perkin		Roberto Farías
2019	Araña	Gerardo	Andrés Wood
2021	Tengo miedo torero	Chica del coro	Rodrigo Sepúlveda
2023	The Settlers	Vicuña	Felipe Gálvez Haberle

=== Telenovelas ===
Año	Título	Personaje		Canal
1993	Marrón glacé	Iván	Reparto	Canal 13
1994	Champaña	Willy Palacios	Reparto	Canal 13
1996	Marrón glacé, el regreso	Iván	Reparto	Canal 13
1997	Eclipse de luna	Gustavo Ruiz	Reparto	Canal 13
2004	Los Pincheira	Domingo del Solar	Reparto	TVN
2005	Los Capo	Paolo Capo Ragianni	Papel co-principal	TVN
2006	Cómplices	Gerardo Martínez	Antagonista	TVN
2007	Corazón de María	Boris Tapia	Reparto	TVN
2008	Viuda alegre	Rodrigo Zulueta	Papel co-principal	TVN
2009	Los exitosos Pells	Esteban Núñez	Antagonista	TVN
2009–2010	Conde Vrolok	Juan de Dios Verdugo	Antagonista	TVN
2011	El laberinto de Alicia	Esteban Donoso	Antagonista	TVN
2012	Reserva de familia	Pedro Serrano	Papel co-principal	TVN
2013	Socias	Federico Ibáñez	Papel co-principal	TVN
2014	Vuelve temprano	Francisco Valenzuela	Papel co-principal	TVN
2015	La poseída	Padre Raimundo Zisternas	Papel principal	TVN
2016–2017	El camionero	Antonio Flores	Papel principal	TVN
2017–2018	Wena profe	Javier Meza	Papel principal	TVN
2019–2021	100 días para enamorarse	Diego Prieto	Reparto	Mega
