= Generación 98 =

- Genre: Telenovela
- Created by: Pablo Illanes
- Directed by: Nicolás Alemparte Bickell
- Starring: Gabriel Cañas; María Gracia Omegna; Nicolás Oyarzún; Daniela Ramírez; Ignacia Baeza; Felipe Rojas; Paloma Moreno
- Opening theme: "Cuando seas grande" by Miguel Mateos
- Country of origin: Chile
- Original language: Spanish
- No. of seasons: 1
- No. of episodes: 178

Production
- Executive producers: Patricio López; Vania Portilla
- Producer: Verónica Brañes
- Production location: Santiago de Chile
- Editor: Nelson Valdés
- Camera setup: Multi-camera
- Production company: Chilefilms

Original release
- Network: Mega
- Release: June 5, 2023 – April 22, 2024

Generación 98 is a Chilean telenovela created by Pablo Illanes. It aired on Mega from June 5, 2023 to April 22, 2024. The series follows seven former classmates who reunite after 25 years without seeing each other.

== Cast ==
- Gabriel Cañas as Hernán "Chico" Olmedo
- Daniela Ramírez as Marta "Sintética" Salazar
- Nicolás Oyarzún as Gonzalo "Minazo" Bulnes
- María Gracia Omegna as Valentina "Cartulina" Morán
- Ignacia Baeza as María Loreto "Alcachofa" Del Valle
- Felipe Rojas as Tomás "Moco" Rodríguez
- Paloma Moreno as Javiera "Jirafa" Aldunatez
- Francisco Reyes as Arturo Bulnes
- Tamara Acosta as Julia Gazmuri
- Luz Valdivieso as Constanza Stuardo
- Josefina Montané as Paula Fuentealba
- Nicolás Poblete as Juan José Matte
- Constanza Mackenna as Macarena Norambuena
- Gabriel Urzúa as Robin Valdivia / Samuel de La Huerta
- Simón Pesutic as Vicente Reyes
- María Elena Duvauchelle
- Lorena Capetillo
- Guilherme Sepúlveda as Octavio
- Lucas Maffei as Sebastián Smith
- Sofía González de Lasa as Fernanda Smith
- Alondra Valenzuela as Jacinta Matte
- Beltrán Izquierdo as Gabriel Rodríguez

== Reception ==
=== Ratings ===
Season	Episodes	First aired		Last aired	
Season	Episodes	Date	Rating (in points)	Date	Rating (in points)
1	178	June 5, 2023	22.1	April 22, 2024	19.1

=== Awards and nominations ===
Year	Award	Category	Nominated	Result	Ref
2023	Produ Awards	Best Telenovela	Generación 98	Nominated	
2023	Produ Awards	Best Lead Actor - Superseries or Telenovela	Gabriel Cañas	Nominated	
2023	Produ Awards	Best Supporting Actress - Superseries or Telenovela	Paloma Moreno	Nominated	
