= Si yo fuera rico =

- Written by: Rodrigo Cuevas; Isabel Budinich; José Fonseca; Claudia Villarroel
- Directed by: Víctor Huerta; Matías Stagnaro; Enrique Bravo
- Starring: Jorge Zabaleta; Mariana Loyola; Daniel Muñoz; María Gracia Omegna; Simón Pesutic; Gonzalo Valenzuela
- Opening theme: "Si yo fuera rico" by Hueso Carrizo
- Country of origin: Chile
- Original language: Spanish
- No. of seasons: 1
- No. of episodes: 172

Production
- Executive producer: Patricio López
- Producer: Verónica Brañes
- Camera setup: Multi-camera
- Production company: Mega

Original release
- Network: Mega
- Release: January 8 – October 2, 2018

Si yo fuera rico is a Chilean telenovela written by Rodrigo Cuevas, that premiered on Mega on January 8, 2018 and ended on October 2, 2018. It stars Jorge Zabaleta, Mariana Loyola, Gonzalo Valenzuela, María Gracia Omegna, Daniel Muñoz and Simón Pesutic.

== Plot ==
The life of three Chileans will change after winning a coveted game of chance: Miguel, a lonely thief who will keep the winning lottery ticket he found in Pascuala's car, who never knew that the ticket had the winning numbers and, as her discreet benefactor, will make love flourish between them. Nelson, who lives in a small place and is immature and emotional, has been dreaming of winning a grand prize and quickly decides to buy the football team he has supported since he was a child, "Renca Juniors", to turn them into the Real Madrid of South America. Matilde and Tomás Varela are orphans who have lived a life marked by tragedy. Matilde buys a lucky ticket, but discovers that she cannot claim it because she is a minor. When Dante, a charming prince who has come to save her, appears, she does not imagine that he is actually the nephew of a scammer who organized the meeting.

== Cast ==
- Jorge Zabaleta as Nelson Peña
- Mariana Loyola as Julia Molina
- Gonzalo Valenzuela as Miguel "Micky" Zunino
- María Gracia Omegna as Pascuala Domínguez
- Daniel Muñoz como Erick Ferrada / Erick Zapata.
- Simón Pesutic as Dante Galaz
- Solange Lackington as Mónica Salas
- María Fernanda Martínez as Matilde Varela
- Coca Guazzini as Yolanda "Yoli" Santander
- Claudio Arredondo as "El Compadre" Inostroza
- Fernando Larraín as Rubén de la Maza
- Katyna Huberman as Antonia Miller
- Álvaro Gómez as Facundo Grandinetti
- Carolina Arredondo as Tamara Martínez
- Manuela Opazo as Begoña Cuadra
- Oliver Börner as Ronaldo "Rony" Peña
- Diego Guerrero as Felipe "Pipe" Ríos
- Magdalena Urra as Lucía "Lucy" Brito
- Catalina Benítez as Camila Peña
- Andrés Commentz as Tomás "Tomy" Varela / Tomás Salas
- Matilde Campero as Constanza "Cuky" Palma
- Sergio Hernández as Aquiles Zapata
- Pablo Cerda as Nicolás Ríos
- Teresita Commentz as Marisela Ibáñez
- Nahuel Cantillano as Santiago Palma
- Antonia Bosman as Alejandra Cienfuegos
- Patricio Andrade as Ricardo Galaz
- Carlos Martínez as González
- Rodrigo Walker as Pedro Martínez
- María Zamarbide as Lola Luján
- Gastón Pauls as Leonel
- Daniela Domínguez as Patricia "Paty" Escobar
- Francisco González as Demetrio Ortiz
- Pelusa Troncoso as Irma Sanhueza
- Seide Tosta as Laura
- Pablo Green as Marcos Aguilera
- Renato Illanes as Edo Rojas
- Sebastián Altamirano as Reinaldo Peña
- Julio César Serrano as Rucio
- Patricio Jara as Garzón
- Dylan González as Soto
- Hugo Vásquez as Fernando

== Ratings ==
Season	Episodes	First aired		Last aired		Average
Season	Episodes	Date	Rating	Date	Rating	Average
1	172	January 8, 2018	17.3	October 2, 2018	22.1	15.9
