= El señor de La Querencia (2024 TV series) =

- Genre: Telenovela
- Based on: El señor de La Querencia by Víctor Carrasco
- Directed by: Nicolás Alemparte Bickell
- Starring: Gabriel Cañas; María Gracia Omegna; Nicolás Oyarzún
- Country of origin: Chile
- Original language: Spanish
- No. of seasons: 1
- No. of episodes: 78

Production
- Executive producers: María Eugenia Rencoret; Patricio López; Vania Portilla
- Producer: Verónica Brañes
- Editor: Nelson Valdés
- Camera setup: Multi-camera
- Production company: Chilefilms

Original release
- Network: Mega
- Release: July 17 – December 5, 2024

El señor de La Querencia is a Chilean telenovela based on the 2008 telenovela of the same name, created by Víctor Carrasco. It aired on Mega from July 17, 2024, to December 5, 2024. It stars Gabriel Cañas, María Gracia Omegna and Nicolás Oyarzún.

== Cast ==
=== Main ===
- Gabriel Cañas as José Luis Echenique Valdivieso
- María Gracia Omegna as Leonor Amenábar Montt
- Nicolás Oyarzún as Manuel Pradenas Leiva
- Ignacia Baeza as Mercedes Amenábar de los Ríos
- Luz Valdivieso as Leontina Aguirre
- Roberto Farías as Buenaventura Moreno
- Lorena Capetillo as María Pradenas Leiva
- Francisco Dañobeitía as Ignacio Echenique Amenábar
- Vivianne Dietz as Teresita Echenique Amenábar
- Paula Luchsinger as Lucrecia Santa María Amenábar
- Francisca Walker as Herminia Pradenas Leiva
- Joaquín Guzmán as Luis Emilio Echenique Amenábar
- Vanessa Perić as Violeta Moreno Pradenas
- Simón Pesutic as Juan Cristóbal León
- Paulina Hunt as Carmen Soto

=== Recurring and guest stars ===
- Norma Norma Ortiz as Bernarda Leiva
- Carlos Martínez as Pedro
- Patricio Cifuentes as Pancho

== Production ==
In March 2024, a report in El Mostrador revealed that Televisión Nacional de Chile licensed the rights to three of its most successful telenovelas of recent times to Mega, including El señor de La Querencia, for an amount close to US$200,000 each title over a period of eight years to produce remakes with their own casts. The purchase of the scripts generated criticism on social media and diverse opinions from multiple personalities against Televisión Nacional for selling its assets. Filming began on 3 April 2024.

== Reception ==
=== Ratings ===
Season	Episodes	First aired		Last aired	
Season	Episodes	Date	Rating (in points)	Date	Rating (in points)
1	78	July 17, 2024	14.8	December 5, 2024	16.9

=== Awards and nominations ===
Year	Award	Category	Nominated	Result	Ref
2024	Produ Awards	Best Superseries	El señor de la querencia	Nominated	
2024	Produ Awards	Best Lead Actress - Superseries	María Gracia Omegna	Nominated	
2024	Produ Awards	Best Lead Actor - Superseries	Gabriel Cañas	Nominated	
2024	Produ Awards	Best Lead Actor - Superseries	Nicolás Oyarzún	Nominated	
2024	Produ Awards	Best Screenplay - Superseries or Telenovela	Víctor Carrasco, Carlos Galofré, David Bustos, Rodrigo Ossandón & Carlos Oporto	Won	
