= Amar profundo =

- Genre: Telenovela
- Created by: Jonathan Cuchacovich
- Written by: Sergio Díaz; Marcelo Castañón; Valentina Pollarolo; Fernanda Vivado
- Directed by: Víctor Huerta; María Belen Arenas
- Starring: María Gracia Omegna; Nicolás Oyarzún; Josefina Montané; Pedro Campos; Elisa Zulueta
- Opening theme: "Agua segura" by Denise Rosenthal ft. Mala Rodríguez
- Country of origin: Chile
- Original language: Spanish
- No. of seasons: 1
- No. of episodes: 156

Production
- Executive producers: María Eugenia Rencoret; Patricio López; Pablo Díaz
- Producer: Verónica Brañes
- Editor: Nelson Valdés
- Camera setup: Multi-camera
- Production companies: Mega; DDRío Estudios

Original release
- Network: Mega
- Release: November 23, 2021 – August 24, 2022

Amar profundo is a Chilean telenovela created by Jonathan Cuchacovich for Mega. It aired from November 23, 2021 to August 24, 2022. The telenovela follows the Contreras Family, a group of women who must take over their late father's artisanal fishing business in order to get out of debt.

It stars María Gracia Omegna, Nicolás Oyarzún, Josefina Montané, Pedro Campos, and Elisa Zulueta.

== Plot ==
After the death of her father, Tamara Contreras (María Gracia Omegna) returns to her hometown to pay off a debt that could leave her family out on the street. With the help of her mother and sisters, Tamara takes over her late father's artisanal fishing business, being questioned by the prejudiced men who worked for him and by the president of the fishing union, Fabián Bravo (Nicolás Oyarzún), who happens to be the creditor of the debt.

== Cast ==
- María Gracia Omegna as Tamara Contreras Solís
- Nicolás Oyarzún as Fabián Bravo
- Josefina Montané as Marina Chamorro
- Pedro Campos as Eric Neira
- Elisa Zulueta as Marlen Marambio
- Jorge Arecheta como Ignacio Goycolea
- Carmen Disa Gutiérrez as Elvira Solís
- Magdalena Müller as Ramona Contreras Solís
- Paula Luchsinger as Jeimy Contreras Solís
- Fernando Godoy as Danilo Chaparro
- Dayana Amigo as Gema Mardones
- Loreto Valenzuela as Abigail Mardones
- Otilio Castro as Jeremías Bravo
- Carolina Arredondo as Begoña
- José Antonio Raffo as Lizardo Gaete
- Soledad Cruz as Marisol Mardones
- Max Salgado as Oliver Parra
- Andrés Olea as Rollizo
- Octavia Bernasconi as Rafaela Bravo
- Diego Rojas as Gaspar Neira
- Amanda Silva as Celeste Goycolea Contreras

== Production ==
Filming of Amar profundo began in September 2021 and concluded on March 16, 2022.

== Reception ==
=== Ratings ===
Season	Episodes	First aired		Last aired	
Season	Episodes	Date	Rating (in points)	Date	Rating (in points)
1	156	November 23, 2021	23.6	August 24, 2022	23.8

=== Awards and nominations ===
Year	Award	Category	Nominated	Result	Ref
2022	Produ Awards	Best Telenovela	Amar profundo	Nominated	
2022	Produ Awards	Best Lead Actress - Superseries or Telenovela	María Gracia Omegna	Nominated	
2022	Produ Awards	Best Supporting Actress - Superseries or Telenovela	Josefina Montané	Nominated	
