= Matías Bize =

Chilean film director, producer and screenwriter

Matias Bize
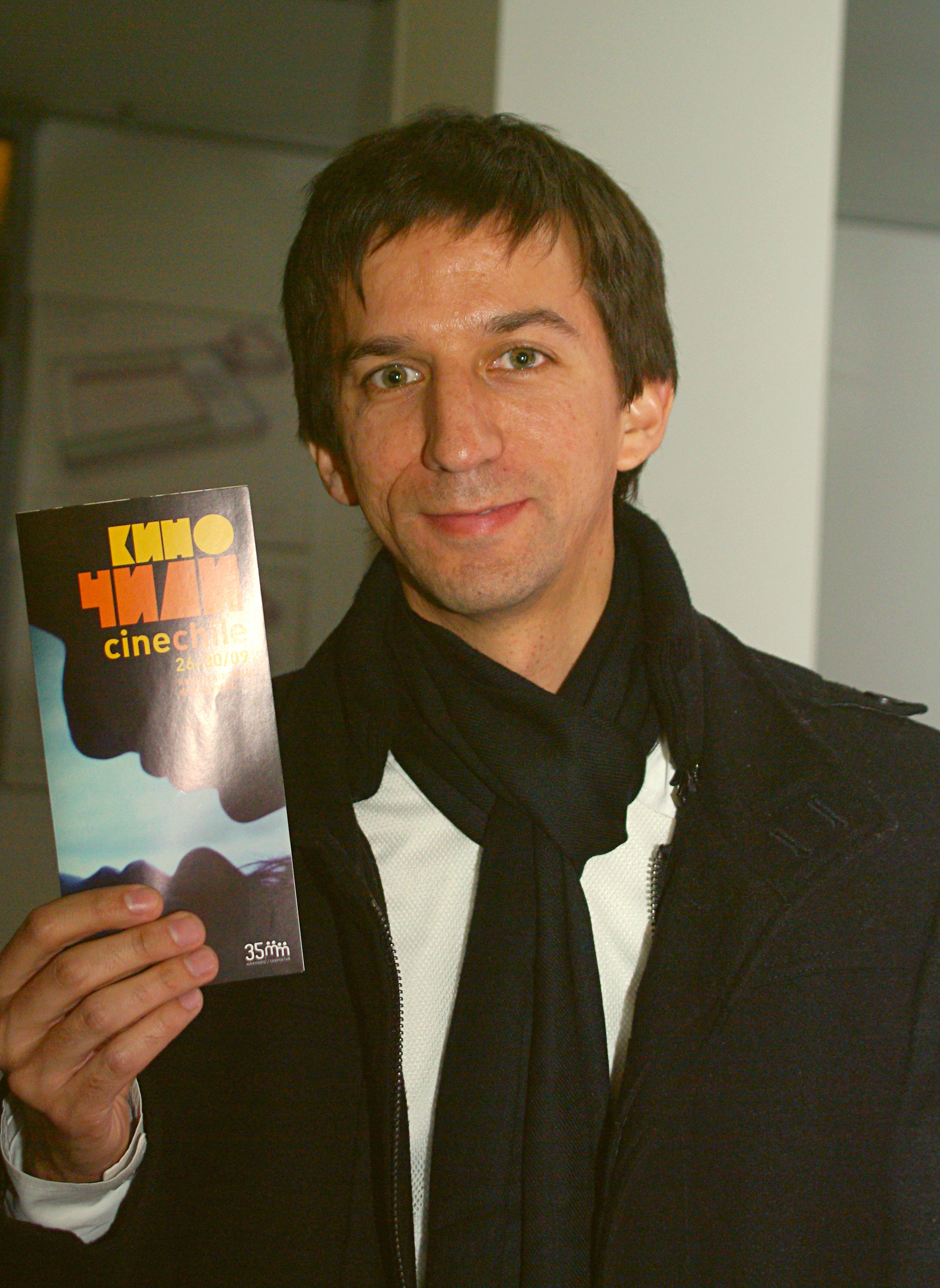
- Matias Bize at Moscow
- Born: August 1979 (age 46–47); Santiago, Chile
- Education: Escuela de Cine de Chile (es)
- Occupations: Film director, Screenwriter, Film producer, Film editor
- Years active: Since 2002

Matías Bize (born Santiago, Chile, 9 August 1979) is a Chilean film director, producer and screenwriter. He has won important independent film awards including the Espiga de Oro for In Bed at the 2005 Valladolid International Film Festival in Spain, and a Goya Award in 2011 for The Life of Fish.

== Biography ==
Bize studied at San Juan Evangelista School in Santiago, Chile and then at the Chilean Film School.

He made his first short films as a student: Carla and Max and Last Night (Spanish: La Noche Anterior) both in 1999 and The People are Waiting (Spanish: La Gente Está Esperando) in 2000. In 2002, at the age of 23 and not yet a graduate, he directed his first feature-length film, Saturday (Spanish: Sábado), a real time film. His short film Last Night was a prequel to Saturday, starring the same actors (Blanca Lewin and Víctor Montero) in the same roles.

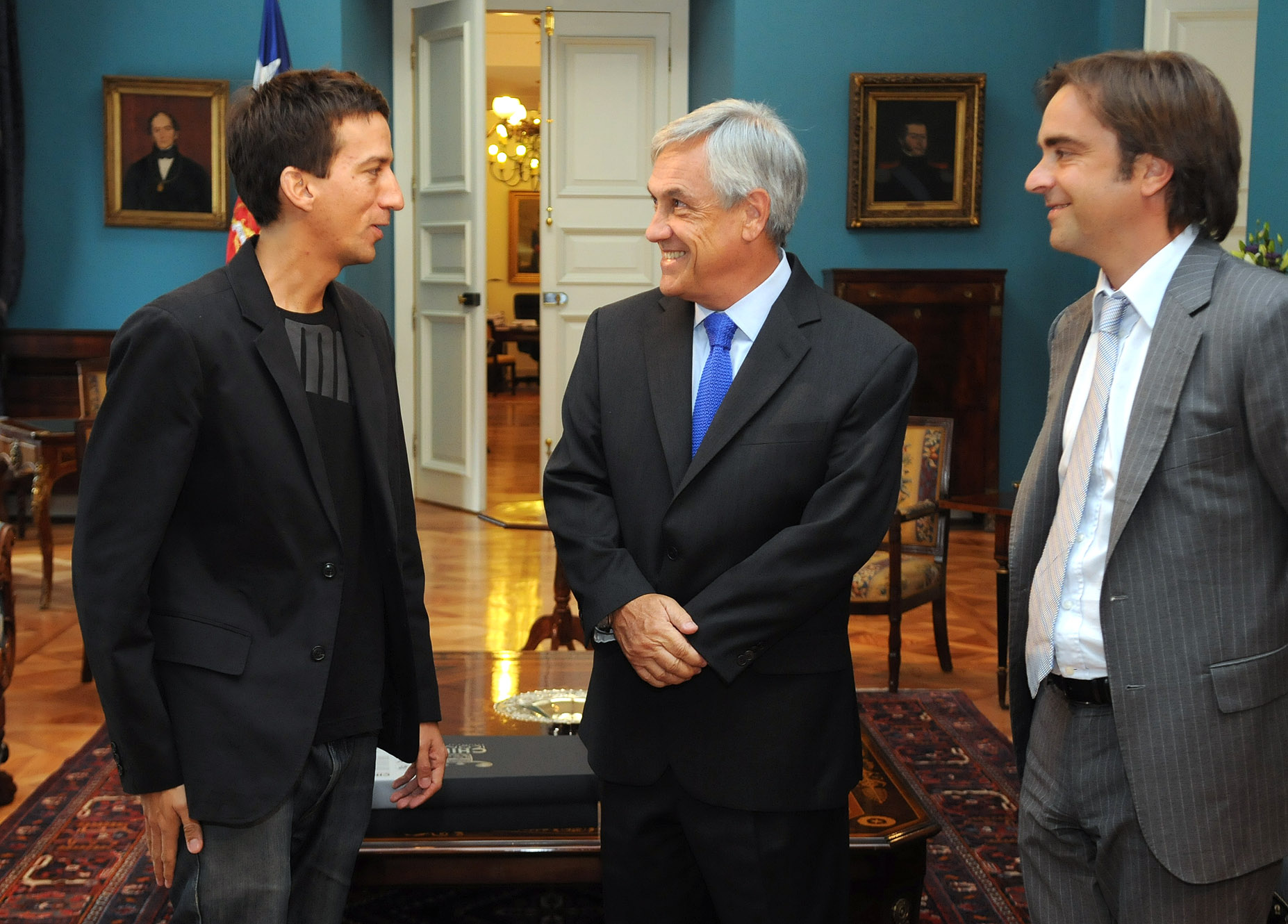
Bize visit La Moneda after winning his Goya Award for Best Spanish Language Foreign Film

Saturday, a tragicomedy about a wedding cancelled at the last minute, had its worldwide premiere at the 2003 International Filmfestival Mannheim-Heidelberg where it won four awards, including the Rainer Werner Fassbinder Prize for Best Film “for its freshness, innovation and energy”, the Best Actress award and the Critics’ Prize. It also won the Jury's Prize for Best First Film at the 8th Cine Las Americas International Film Festival in Austin, Texas.

Two years later, Bize directed the feature-length In Bed(Spanish: En la Cama), a Chilean-German production that premiered at the Locarno International Film Festival in Switzerland. The film won the Espiga de Oro at the Valladolid International Film Festival in Spain and Bize became the youngest director ever to win this award. In total, In Bed won more than 35 international awards and went on commercial release in many countries across the world. Meanwhile, Bize continued making fictional shorts as well as music videos and documentaries.

Bize's third feature film, the Spanish production About Crying (Spanish: Lo Bueno de Llorar), tells the story of a breakup. It premiered at the Locarno International Film Festival and went on release in Spain.

With The Life of Fish, Bize reconfirmed his place as a director of international stature. In 2011, the Spanish Film Academy named the film Best Foreign Spanish Language Film at the prestigious Goya Awards and in the same year, Bize won Best Director at the Los Angeles Latino International Film Festival (LALIFF).

In 2012, Bize was selected along with five other directors to take part in the Berlin International Film Festival's new residency programme to make his fifth feature film, The Memory of Water (Spanish: La Memoria del Agua). The script of this Chilean-German production was written in partnership with Julio Rojas.

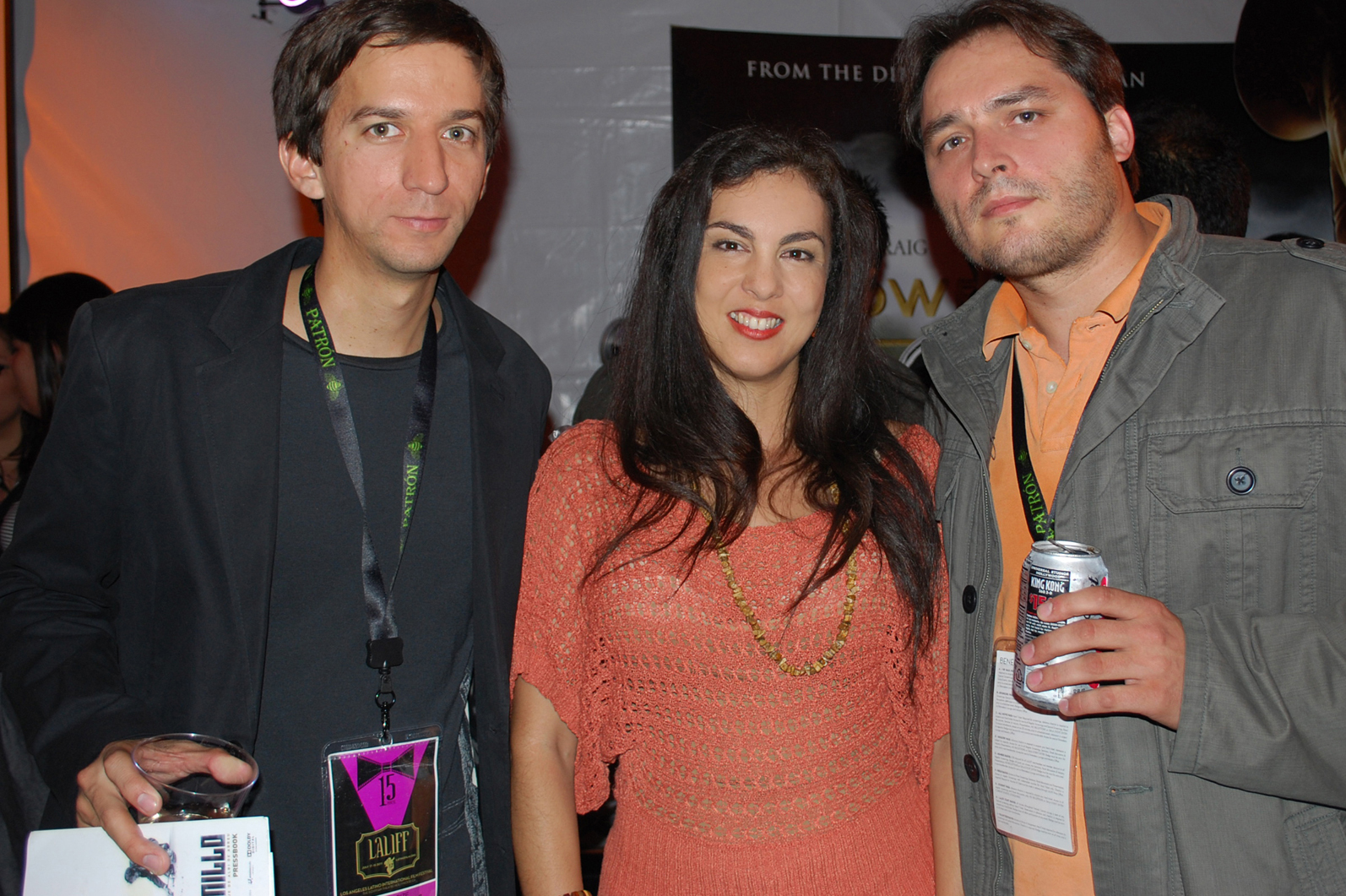
Jackie Di Crystal and Matias Bize at LALIFF

== Filmography ==
=== Director ===
- Carla and Max (Spanish: Carla y Max), short, 1999
- Last Night (Spanish: La Noche Anterior), short, 1999
- The People are Waiting (Spanish: La Gente Está Esperando), short, 2000
- Saturday (Spanish: Sábado), feature-length, 2002
- In Bed (En La Cama), feature-length, 2005
- Summer Game (Spanish: Juego de Verano), feature-length jointly directed with Fernando *Aljaro, Daniela González and Andrea Wasaff, 2005
- Calling (Spanish: Llamando), short, 2005
- Confession (Spanish: Confesión), short, 2006
- About Crying (Spanish: Lo Bueno de Llorar), feature-length, 2006
- The Mirror of Her Eyes (Spanish: El Espejo de sus Ojos), short, 2007
- The Life of Fish (Spanish: La Vida de los Peces), feature-length, 2010
- The Memory of Water (Spanish: La memoria del agua), feature-length, 2015
- The Punishment (Spanish: El castigo), feature-length, 2022

=== Writer ===
- Calling (Spanish: Llamando), 2005
- About Crying (Spanish: Lo Bueno de Llorar), feature-length, 2006
- The Life of Fish (Spanish: La Vida de los Peces), feature-length, 2010

=== Producer ===
- Saturday (Spanish: Sábado), 2002
- About Crying (Spanish: Lo Bueno de Llorar), feature-length, 2006

== See also ==
- Cinema of Chile

=== External links ===
- Matías Bize at IMDb
- Official website (in Spanish)
