= Claudio Arredondo =

Chilean actor and politician

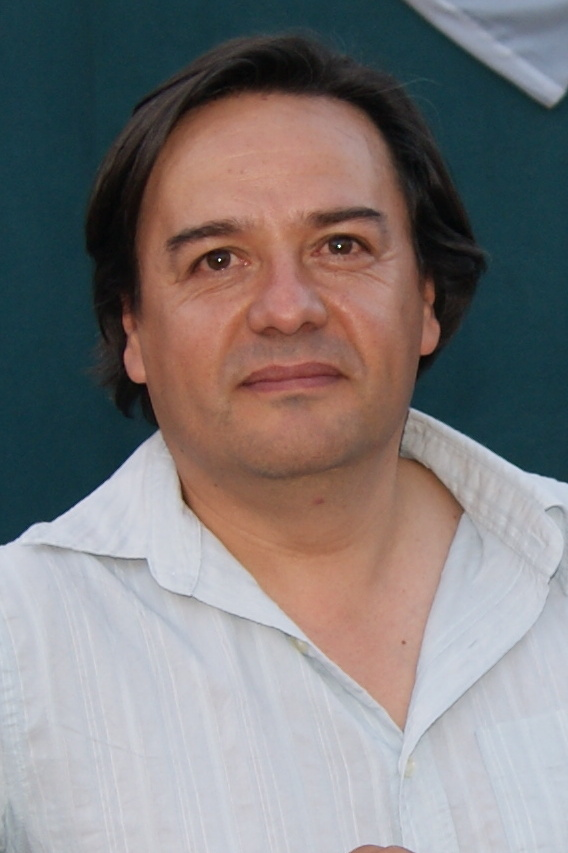
- Arredondo in 2009
- Born: Claudio Alejandro Marcelo Arredondo Medina; 29 November 1962 (age 63); Santiago, Chile
- Occupations: Actor, politician
- Years active: 1982–present

Claudio Alejandro Marcelo Arredondo Medina (born 29 November 1962, in Santiago) is a Chilean film, theater and television actor and politician.

== Acting career ==
He studied at the Fernando González Acting Academy.

He began his career in 1982 on the television series De cara al mañana on Televisión Nacional de Chile. The same year he emigrated to Canal 13 to be part of the successful novels Los títeres and Ángel malo. After a time away by a veto, he returns to Canal 13 to be part of Viviendo así.

In the late 1980s, he founded the "Teatro de la Esquina" which was showing plays for school children. The theater had to close in 2000.

From 1989 to 2010 he was part of the Dramatic Area of TVN, participating in supporting roles in the telenovelas A la sombra del angel, Aquelarre, Amores de mercado, Los treinta, Alguien te mira and Los Ángeles de Estela, among others. Arredondo is widely known for his multiple collaborations with director María Eugenia Rencoret.

He starred in the hit 2005 series Heredia y Asociados, for which he received the Altazor Award for Best Television Actor in the 2006 issue.

In 2011, after 22 years, he returns to Channel 13 to be one of the protagonists of Peleles.

In 2015 he emigrated to the Mega Dramatic Area to participate in the television series Papá a la deriva.

He made his film debut in the medium-length film Ángeles by Tatiana Gaviola. He has also been a part of the films Negocio redondo, Matar a todos y Casa de remolienda.

== Political career ==
He appeared in the municipal elections of Chile in 2012 where he was elected councilor of the commune of La Florida (Greater Santiago) for the period 2012–2016 as an independent supported by the Christian Democratic Party of Chile. He ran again for councilor in the period 2016–2020, and was re-elected.

== Personal life ==
He is the son of actress Gabriela Medina and her first husband, although he took the surname of her adoptive father, also actor César Arredondo.

In 1986 he married the actress and current deputy Carolina Marzán, with whom he is the father of the actress Carolina Arredondo.

In the 1990s he had a relationship with actress Marcela Stangher with whom he is the father of María José.

In 2012 he married the actress Ana Luz Figueroa. They are both parents of Teo.

== Filmography ==
=== Films ===
- Ángeles (1988) – Antonio
- Negocio redondo (2001)
- Matar a todos (2007)
- Casa de remolienda (2007) – Oscar Badilla
- Ema (2019)
- My Brothers Dream Awake (2021) – Attorney
- The True Story Of People In The Dragon (2024) – Claudio Elizondo

=== Telenovelas ===
Telenovelas
Year	Telenovela	Role	Channel
1982	De cara al mañana	Sergio Carrasco	TVN
1982	Bienvenido Hermano Andes	Patricio Villarroel	Canal 13
1984	Los títeres	Lorenzo	Canal 13
1986	Ángel Malo	Luis Oyarzo	Canal 13
1988	Vivir Así	Junior Mora	Canal 13
1989	A la sombra del ángel	Ismael Castro	TVN
1990	El milagro de vivir	Patricio Moraga	TVN
1991	Volver a empezar	Patricio Moure	TVN
1994	Rojo y Miel	Manuel	TVN
1997	Tic Tac	Antonio "Toño" Rojas	TVN
1998	Borrón y cuenta nueva	Ulises Carvajal	TVN
1999	Aquelarre	Benito Aranza	TVN
2000	Santo ladrón	Braulio Gómez	TVN
2001	Amores de mercado	Basilio Concha	TVN
2002	Purasangre	Antonio "Toño" Véliz	TVN
2003	Pecadores	Eleuterio Carrasco	TVN
2004	Destinos cruzados	Topo Salgado	TVN
2005	Los treinta	Andrés Barraza	TVN
2005	Versus	Clemente Fuentealba	TVN
2006	Floribella	Raúl Carrasco	TVN
2007	Alguien te mira	Pedro Pablo Peñafiel	TVN
2007	Amor por accidente	Manuel Pacheco	TVN
2008	Hijos del Monte	Efraín Mardones	TVN
2009	Los Ángeles de Estela	Samuel Rocha "Samuel Samuel"	TVN
2010	La familia de al lado	Nibaldo González	TVN
2011	Peleles	Tito Jara	Canal 13
2013	Las Vegas	Germán Soto	Canal 13
2013	Secretos en el Jardín	Braulio Hernández	Canal 13
2014	Valió la pena	Juan Roca "Johnny Rock"	Canal 13
2015	Papá a la deriva	Queno Padilla	Mega
2016	Ámbar	Rogelio Pino	Mega
2017	Perdona nuestros pecados	Padre Esteban Madrid	Mega
2018	Si yo fuera rico	Compadre Inostroza	Mega
2019	Juegos de poder	Matias Bennet	Mega
2021	Edificio Corona		Mega
2024	Nuevo amores de mercado	Clinton Midesraub	Mega

=== TV Series ===
TV series
Year	Produccion	Role	Channel
1998	Mi abuelo, mi nana y yo	Ladrón	TVN
1998	Cuentos Chilenos	Carlos Romeral	TVN
2004	La vida es una lotería	Ángel	TVN
2005	Heredia y asociados	Ernesto Heredia	TVN
2005	Tiempo final: en tiempo real	Rafael	TVN
2006	El día menos pensado	Patricio	TVN
2008	Aída		TVN
2010	La Tirana	Rufiño	TVN
2011	Cesante	Rolando Cuevas	CHV
2013	El hombre de tu vida	Agustín	Canal 13
2013	Los 80	Manuel	Canal 13
2015	Príncipes de barrio	Germán Vicencio	Canal 13
2017	Neruda		Mega
2017	Los Buenos Cabros	El Padre	Equipo TV
2020	Historias de cuarentena	Roberto	Mega

=== Theatre plays ===
==== As actor ====
- A la cabeza del ganado
- Trilogía Equipo
- Te llamas Rosicler
- Ardiente paciencia
- Idiota
- Nuestras mujeres
- Revueltos
- Entre amigos
- Tres noches de un sábado
- Pancho Villa
- Confesiones del pene
- Excusas
- Adela, la mal Pagá
- Por la razón o la fuerza
- Todos tenemos problemas sexuales
- El cepillo de dientes
- Háblame de Laura
- Stand up

==== As director ====
- El Soldadito de Plomo
- Acaloradas
- ¿Dónde estará la Jeannette?
- Duros
- Aniversario
- Misterio gozoso
