= Elisa Zulueta =

Chilean actress

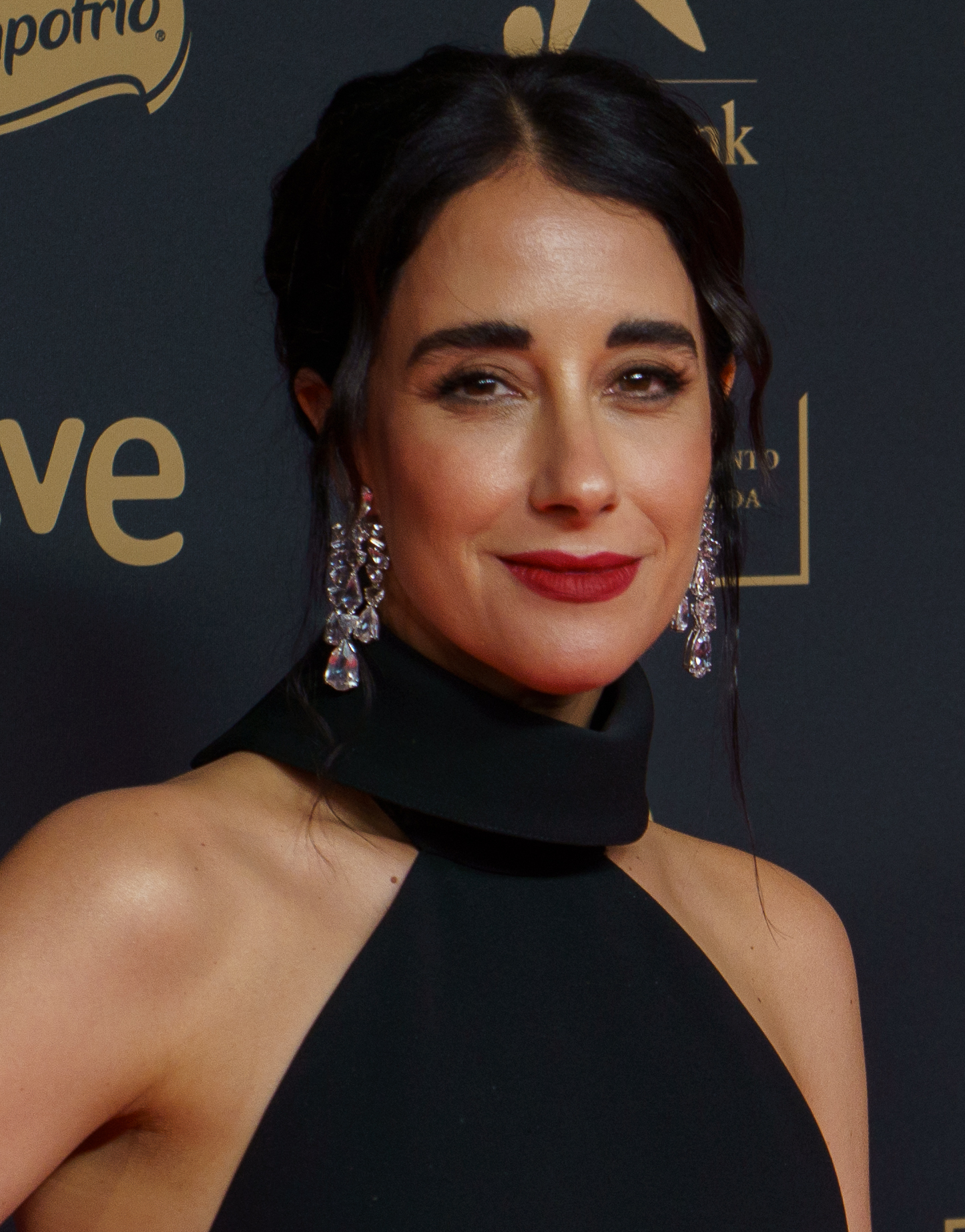
- Zulueta in 2025
- Born: Elisa Zulueta; September 14, 1981 (age 44); Santiago de Chile, Chile
- Education: Pontifical Catholic University of Chile
- Occupations: Actress, playwright, theatre director

Elisa Zulueta (born September 14, 1981) is a Chilean television, theatre and film actress.

== Life and career ==
Born in Santiago, Zulueta studied at the Pontificia Universidad Católica de Chile. Formerly, she worked for TVN where she made little work in telenovelas and series. In 2008, she gained fame with the role of Julia Amigo in the telenovela Lola of Canal 13. In 2009, Elisa Zulueta and Emilio Edwards were the main roles for the Chilean film Tanto Tiempo, directed by Claudio Polgati. The film won two prizes in the eight version of the Festival Internacional de Cine Chico de Canarias. She was the protagonist of the Maite Alberdi's Goya Award nominee film In Her Place.

== Filmography ==
=== Films ===
- Tanto Tiempo (2009) – Elisa
- Mamá (2009)
- El incontrolable mundo del azar (2012) - Cristina Armijo
- Que Pena tu Familia (2012) – Valentina
- No soy Lorena (2014) - Secretaria Académica
- Swing (2018) - Dolores
- El Fantasma (2024) - Judi
- In Her Place (2024) – Mercedes

=== Television ===
- Mi Primera Vez (2006, TVN) – Student
- Floribella (2006, TVN) – Nurse
- Lola (2007–2008, Canal 13) – Julia Amigo
- Feroz (2010, Canal 13) – Valentina
- Soltera Otra Vez (2012, Canal 13) – Marjorie López
- Dama y Obrero (2012, TVN) – Mireya Ledesma
- Socias (2013, TVN) – Dolores Montt
- No Abras la Puerta (2014, TVN) – Silvana Bunivic
- Juana Brava (2015, TVN) - Juana Bravo
- Por Fin Solos (TVN, 2016) - Catalina
- Secretos de familia (2024, Canal 13) - Rocío Pardo Jiménez

=== Theatre ===
As an actress

- Nagy (2005)
- Ricardo III (2005)
- Macbeth (2005)
- Estaciones de Paso (2007)
- Talk Radio (2008)
- Gladys (2012–2014)
- La Grabación (2013–2014)

As a director

- Pérez (2009)
- Gladys (2011–2014)

As a playwright

- Pérez (2009)
- Gladys (2011)
- Mía (2012)
