= Yo soy Lorenzo =

- Genre: Telenovela
- Created by: Daniella Castagno
- Written by: Daniella Castagno; Alejandro Bruna; José Fonseca
- Directed by: Nicolás Alemparte; Bárbara Della Schiava
- Starring: Mario Horton; Jorge Arecheta; Francisco Reyes; Vivianne Dietz; Sigrid Alegría
- Country of origin: Chile
- Original language: Spanish
- No. of seasons: 1
- No. of episodes: 148

Production
- Executive producer: Patricio López
- Producer: Claudia Cazanave
- Editor: Nelson Valdés
- Camera setup: Multi-camera
- Production company: Mega

Original release
- Network: Mega
- Release: September 2, 2019 – May 25, 2020

Yo soy Lorenzo is a Chilean telenovela created by Daniella Castagno, that premiered on Mega on September 2, 2019 and ended on May 25, 2020. It stars Mario Horton, Jorge Arecheta, Francisco Reyes, Vivianne Dietz and Sigrid Alegría.

The telenovela revolves around the impersonation of identities and the difficulties of female liberation and being gay in the 1960s.

== Plot ==
Ernesto (Francisco Reyes) is a powerful man who wants his only daughter, Laura (Vivianne Dietz), to get married. Laura is a young woman in her twenties who wishes to emigrate from the village and live freely away from there. What she does not know is that her father agreed with a friend from Santiago so that his son, Lorenzo (Jorge Arecheta), arrives at Vista Hermosa and conquers her. However, when Lorenzo travels with his driver Carlos (Mario Horton) to Vista Hermosa to seal the commitment, he confesses that he is gay and so they both decide to switch identities and this is how Carlos begins to be Lorenzo.

== Cast ==
- Mario Horton as Carlos González / Lorenzo Mainardi
- Jorge Arecheta as Lorenzo Mainardi / Carlos González
- Francisco Reyes as Ernesto Orellana
- Vivianne Dietz as Laura Orellana
- Sigrid Alegría as Jacinta Jofré
- Patricia López as Patricia Silva
- Rodrigo Muñoz as Horacio Álvarez
- María Elena Duvauchelle as Hortensia Arancibia
- Teresita Reyes as Rosa Jaramillo
- Mabel Farías as Margarita Jaramillo
- Ricardo Vergara as Jimmy Canales
- Francisca Walker as Nancy Álvarez Silva
- Paula Luchsinger as Blanca Noriega Jofré
- Constanza Araya as Gloria Arancibia
- Otilio Castro as Ismael Rojas
- Toto Acuña as Ángel Jaramillo
- Magdalena Urra as Ana Álvarez Silva
- Bastián Faúndez as Diego Pérez

== Ratings ==
Season	Episodes	First aired		Last aired		Average
Season	Episodes	Date	Rating	Date	Rating	Average
1	148	September 2, 2019	28	May 25, 2020	20.5	TBD
