= Papá a la deriva =

- Genre: Telenovela
- Created by: Daniella Castagno
- Written by: Daniella Castagno; Alejandro Bruna; Paula Parra; Felipe Rojas; Raúl Gutiérrez
- Directed by: Felipe Arratia
- Creative director: María Eugenia Rencoret
- Starring: Gonzalo Valenzuela; María Gracia Omegna; Francisca Imboden; Ignacio Achurra; Fernando Larraín; Simón Pesutic; Fernanda Ramírez
- Opening theme: "Buscándote" by Mike Bahía
- Country of origin: Chile
- Original language: Spanish
- No. of seasons: 1
- No. of episodes: 183

Production
- Executive producer: Daniela Demicheli
- Camera setup: Multi-camera
- Production company: Mega

Original release
- Network: Mega
- Release: May 25, 2015 – February 29, 2016

Related
- Papá en apuros

Papá a la deriva (English: Dad Adrift) is a Chilean telenovela created by Daniella Castagno, that premiered on Mega on May 25, 2015, and ended on February 29, 2016.

== Plot ==
The story follows the life of Bruno Montt (Gonzalo Valenzuela), a Navy captain with four children. He is strict and fearless. The plot starts from the day that one of his son's, Cristóbal Montt (Simón Pesutic), arrives in Valparaíso. He's greeted by his three siblings who have all been up to trouble at school recently. That same day, Bruno gets a call from the school principal (Paulina Hunt) saying that the children have done terrible things at school. His son Arturo (Nahuel Cantillano) uploaded naked photos of his teachers. His daughter Esmeralda (Li Fridman) bribed a teacher to get out of physical education. Finally, his daughter Marina (Giulia Inostroza) robbed her teacher's makeup.

Things get even worse for Bruno, his children are very mischievous and the only person who had been taking care of the house and keeping things in order was the butler Eugenio Padilla (Claudio Arredondo). One day, Bruno goes out and leaves Eugenio in charge of the house, but seeing as he can't manage the kids on his own he calls his daughter Violeta (María Gracia Omegna). She works on a boat at the Muelle Prat port, she lost her house in the 2014 fires in Valparaíso. Violeta will make the captain a better person by telling him that rules were meant to be broken, and not necessarily to be followed. Bruno is attracted to Violeta from the start, however she has a jealous boyfriend Matías (Ignacio Achurra), the waiter at the restaurant "El Bote Salvavidas" ("The lifesaving boat" in English).

However, the captain's secretary, Rosario (Francisca Imboden) tries to distance Bruno from Violeta and would do anything to get money and satisfy her and her daughter Barbara's needs (Francisca Walker).

Bruno has to learn that his rank as captain won't help him control his children and he has to understand that only through love can he overcome his problems.

== Cast ==
- Gonzalo Valenzuela as Bruno Montt
- María Gracia Omegna as Violeta Padilla
- Francisca Imboden as Rosario Quevedo
- Maricarmen Arrigorriaga as Berta Bonfante
- Solange Lackington as Victoria "Vicky" Urrutia
- Fernando Larraín as Miguel Ayala
- Claudio Arredondo as Eugenio "Queno" Padilla
- Ignacio Achurra as Matías Quiroz
- Simón Pesutic as Cristóbal Montt
- Fernanda Ramírez as Camila Quiroz
- Francisco Dañobeitia as Felipe Briceño
- Francisca Walker as Bárbara "Barbie" González
- Renato Jofré as Diego Quiroz
- Li Fridman as Esmeralda Montt
- Constanza Mackenna as Mary Ann Chamberline
- Nahuel Cantillano as Arturo Montt
- Giulia Inostroza as Marina Montt
- Jacqueline Boudon as Lucía
- Paulina Hunt as Directora del Colegio
- Roberto Prieto as Lucho "El Leyenda"

== Ratings ==
Season	Episodes	First aired		Last aired		Average
Season	Episodes	Date	Rating	Date	Rating	Average
1	183	May 25, 2015	34.2	February 29, 2016	23.5	23.2
