= Elvira Cristi =

Chilean actress and model

- Born: Elvira Teresa Cristi Bueno; 26 November 1976 (age 49); Pedro Aguirre Cerda, Santiago, Chile
- Education: Liceo Abdón Cifuentes
- Occupations: Actress, model

Elvira Teresa Cristi Bueno (born 26 November 1976) is a Chilean actress and model.

== Biography ==
Elvira Cristi began her career at age 13, appearing in television commercials. She obtained the title of "Miss Rostro" (Miss Face) from the magazine Miss 17 in 1994. At that time, she was 17 years old, studying at the Liceo Abdón Cifuentes in Santiago, from which she graduated as a secretary. She also made appearances on the Mega TV program Mekano. At 24, she was hired by an advertising agency in Mexico.

From 2004 to 2006, she appeared on other Mega youth series. There she was seen by director Herval Abreu, who brought her onto the cast of Lola on Canal 13. She has gone on to perform in several Chilean fiction productions, including the 2017 feature film Cold Side and the 2019 telenovela Gemelas.

In 2015, she launched a line of shoes for Dafiti.

For eight years she was the romantic partner of Álvaro España, vocalist of the punk band Fiskales Ad-Hok.

In the early 2000s, Cristi became vegetarian, and two years later, vegan. However, she abandoned this practice in 2015 and is currently flexitarian.

== Filmography ==
=== Telenovelas ===
Year	Title	Role	Channel	Notes
2007	Lola	Victoria Núñez	Canal 13	
2009	Corazón rebelde	Gloria Soto	Canal 13	
2010	Primera dama	Rafaela Fonseca	Canal 13	
2010	40 y Tantos	Consuelo Solar	TVN	Guest star
2011	Esperanza	Bernardita Guzmán	TVN	Guest star
2012	Soltera otra vez	Loretta Buzzio	Canal 13	Guest star
2012	Reserva de familia	Pascal Correa	TVN	
2013	Graduados	Verónica Sarmiento	Chilevisión	
2014	Chipe libre	Bárbara Andrade	Canal 13	
2016	Preciosas	Florencia Márquez	Canal 13	
2019	Gemelas	Andrea Lombardi	Chilevisión	

=== TV series ===
Year	Title	Role	Channel
2004	Don Floro	Cristina Díaz	Mega
2004	Xfea2	Catalina Briones	Mega
2005	Mitú	Gabriela Román	Mega
2005	EsCool	Alfonsina Chamorro	Mega
2006	Porky te amo	Pascuala	Mega
2006	Casado con hijos		Mega
2008	Sea Princesses (voice)	Señorita Marcia	
2011	Infieles	Lucía	Chilevisión
2012	El diario secreto de una profesional	Lisa	TVN
2014	Los archivos del cardenal	Estela Rossi	TVN
2016	Hola, Sandra (webseries)	Property seller	Entel

=== Nonfiction TV programs ===
- Cocktel - Model
- Motín a bordo - Model
- Sal y pimineta - Model
- Contigo en verano - Model
- Viña Festival - Overture dancer
- Pasiones - Games

=== Films ===
Year	Title	Role	Director
1998	El abrazo (short)		Daniel Henríquez
2016	Mother	Saleswoman Aros	Aaron Burns
2016	Una historia de in-felicidad	Constanza	Gabriel Hidalgo
2017	Cold Side	Cristina	Diego Fierro Lablée
