= Pacto de sangre (Chilean TV series) =

- Title card
- Also known as: Blood Pact
- Genre: Telenovela
- Created by: Pablo Ávila; Felipe Montero
- Directed by: Cristián Mason
- Starring: Pablo Macaya; Pablo Cerda; Álvaro Espinoza; Néstor Cantillana; Álvaro Gómez
- Theme music composer: Egon Steger
- Country of origin: Chile
- Original language: Spanish
- No. of seasons: 3
- No. of episodes: 133

Production
- Executive producers: Matías Ovalle; Pablo Ávila
- Producer: Eduardo Alegría
- Production locations: Santiago, Chile
- Cinematography: Catalina Calcagni; Patricio Heim; Diego Muñoz; Juan Andrés Rivera; Carla Stagno
- Editor: Cristóbal Díaz
- Running time: 45 minutes
- Production companies: AGTV Producciones; Grupo Secuoya

Original release
- Network: Canal 13
- Release: September 24, 2018 – May 28, 2019

Related
- Soltera otra vez 3; Río Oscuro

Pacto de sangre (lit. Blood Pact) is a Chilean telenovela produced by AGTV Producciones and Grupo Secuoya and broadcast by Canal 13 from September 24, 2018 to May 28, 2019.

== Cast ==
=== Main ===
- Pablo Macaya as Gabriel Opazo
- Álvaro Espinoza as Benjamín Vial
- Pablo Cerda as Raimundo Costa
- Néstor Cantillana as Marco Toselli
- Ignacia Baeza as Trinidad Errázuriz
- Loreto Aravena as Josefa Urrutia
- Blanca Lewin as Maite Altamirano
- Josefina Montané as Ágata Fernández

=== Supporting ===
- Tamara Acosta as Carmen Núñez
- Álvaro Gómez as Feliciano Fernández
- Cristián Campos as Hernán Errázuriz
- Hernán Contreras as Alonso Errázuriz
- Patricia Guzmán as Elvia Díaz
- Silvia Novak as Teresa Correa
- Willy Semler as Manuel Tapia
- Javiera Hernández as Isabel Bustos
- Antonia Bosman as Daniela Solis Núñez / "Vanessa"
- Rodrigo Walker as Ignacio Vial Errázuriz
- Antonia Giesen as Karina Leiva
- Antonia Aldea as Dominga Costa Altamirano
- Julieta Sanhueza as Clara Vial Errázuriz
- Andrés Arriola as Rozas
- Felipe Ríos as Roberto

=== Special participation ===
- Catalina Vera as Melany
- Daniel Antivilo as Sanhueza
