= El camionero =

Chilean television series

- Title card
- Genre: Romance; Drama
- Written by: Carlos Galofre; Jimena Oto; Jaime Morales; Ivan Salas Moya; Rodrigo Ossandon
- Directed by: Italo Galleani
- Starring: Marcelo Alonso; María Elena Swett; Pablo Cerda; Angie Jibaja
- Opening theme: Por amor by La otra fé
- Country of origin: Chile
- Original language: Spanish
- No. of episodes: 149

Production
- Executive producers: Verónica Saquel; Vicente Sabatini
- Producer: Marcelo Martinez
- Production locations: Santiago, Chile
- Camera setup: Single camera
- Running time: 30-45 minutes
- Production company: Televisión Nacional de Chile

Original release
- Network: TVN; TV Chile
- Release: August 15, 2016 – March 14, 2017

Related
- Matriarcas; La colombiana

El camionero (lit: Truck Driver), is a Chilean television series that aired on TVN and TV Chile from August 15, 2016, to March 14, 2017, starring Marcelo Alonso, María Elena Swett, Pablo Cerda, and Angie Jibaja.

== Plot ==
Antonio Flores (Marcelo Alonso), is a loving and beloved man known in his community for driving a truck on Route 5. He has three siblings: a truck driver, a chef and a student. He did not go unnoticed among women. This free spirit, lives without major concerns until fate puts on its way to the only woman, Ema Kaulen (Mane Swett) could do give up the route.

== Cast ==
=== Main characters ===
- Marcelo Alonso as Antonio Flores Castillo.
- María Elena Swett as Ema Kaulen.
- Pablo Cerda as Genaro Echeverría.
- Magdalena Urra as Amparo Echeverria / Amparo Flores.
- Angie Jibaja as Ursula Porras Rojas.

=== Supporting characters ===
- Carolina Arregui as Vilma Flores Castillo.
- Felipe Braun as Cristóbal Berenguer.
- Héctor Morales as Leonardo Flores.
- María José Prieto as Denise Cienfuegos.
- Luis Alarcón as Emeterio Pérez.
- Denise Rosenthal as Marcela Flores.
- Juan Falcón as Víctor Sanhueza.
- Matías Assler as Sebastián Cienfuegos.
- Belen Soto as Alejandra Sanhueza Flores.
- Raimundo Alcalde as Pablo Kaulen Barros.
- Nicole Block as Noemí Cardenas.
- Bastián Bodenhöfer as Felipe Cienfuegos.
- Vicente Ortiz as Jorge Sanhueza Flores.
- Amparo Noguera as Rosita Zaldivar.
- Luz Valdivieso as Katia Zaldivar.
- Mateo Iribarren as Ernesto.
- Alejandra Fosalba as Claudia.
