= Matriarcas =

- Title card
- Genre: Romance; Drama
- Created by: Sebastián Arrau
- Written by: Sebastian Arrau; Jorge Peña; Valeria Hofmann
- Directed by: Italo Galleani; Claudio López; Cesar Opazo
- Creative director: Verónica Saquel
- Starring: Claudia Di Girólamo; Francisco Reyes; Blanca Lewin; Emilio Edwards; Josefina Fiebelkorn; Gloria Münchmeyer; Ximena Rivas; Juan Falcón
- Opening theme: "Una matriarca" by Denise Rosenthal ft. Consuelo Schuster
- Country of origin: Chile
- Original language: Spanish
- No. of seasons: 1
- No. of episodes: 141

Production
- Executive producer: Verónica Saquel
- Producer: Juan Pablo Ausencio
- Production locations: Santiago, Chile
- Production company: Televisión Nacional de Chile

Original release
- Network: TVN; TV Chile
- Release: May 18 – December 30, 2015

Related
- Caleta del sol; El Camionero

Matriarcas (lit: Matriarchs), is a Chilean television soap opera created by Sebastián Arrau, that aired on TVN and TV Chile from May 18, to December 30, 2015, starring Claudia Di Girólamo, Francisco Reyes, Blanca Lewin, Emilio Edwards, Josefina Fiebelkorn, Gloria Münchmeyer, Ximena Rivas, and Juan Falcón.

== Cast ==
=== Main characters ===
- Claudia Di Girolamo as Diana Nazer.
- Francisco Reyes as Gary Mendez.
- Emilio Edwards as Alexis Santis (alias Donor 7).
- Josefina Fiebelkorn as Matilde Valdes (alias Holy Mommy).
- Blanca Lewin as Chantal Chavez (alias Evil Mommy).
- Coca Guazzini as Grace Peñaloza (alias Mommy Mommy).
- Catalina Saavedra as Constanza Rios (alias Crazy Mommy).
- Andrea Velasco as Juliana Flores (alias Selfie Mommy).

=== Supporting characters ===
- Gloria Münchmeyer as Isabelle Stanford.
- Ximena Rivas as Letizia Nazer.
- Juan Falcón as Johnny Bravo.
- Héctor Morales as Eduardo Bravo.
- Santiago Tupper as Mauricio Bravo.
- Rodrigo Muñoz as Arturo Villar.
- Gonzalo Robles as Francisco Alvarez.
- María Elena Duvauchelle as Trinidad Carreño.
- Teresita Commentz as Dianita Stanford.
- Matías Assler as Claudio Chavez.
- Denise Rosenthal as Sandra Bravo.
- Elisa Alemparte as Leonor Castillo.
- Raúl González as Charles Bravo.
- Geraldine Neary as Amalia Castillo.
- Simón Pascal as Jorge Bravo Peñaloza.
- Dolores Pedro as Soraya Benitez.
- Claudia Hidalgo as Hortensia Ortega.

=== Guest appearances ===
- Paloma Moreno as Maria Pepa.
- Bárbara Mundt as Pepa's Mother.
- Carolina Paulsen as Digna Contreras.
- Yamila Reyna as Cristina Hidalgo.
- Simoney Romero as Marion Aranguiz.
- Alessandra Guerzoni as Francesca Miretti.
- Viviana Shieh as Liu King.

== Reception ==
=== Television ratings ===
Kantar Ibope Media Ratings (Chile)
Original broadcast date		Day rank	Viewership
Series premiere	May 18, 2015	—	10.5%
Series finale	December 30, 2015	—	—
Average			—
