= Martín Rivas (TV series) =

- Title card
- Genre: Historical period drama
- Based on: Martín Rivas by Alberto Blest Gana
- Developed by: María Eugenia Rencoret
- Screenplay by: Víctor Carrasco; David Bustos; Jaime Morales; Carlos Oporto
- Directed by: Germán Barriga; Camilo Sánchez
- Starring: Diego Muñoz; María Gracia Omegna
- Country of origin: Chile
- Original language: Spanish
- No. of episodes: 125

Production
- Executive producer: María Eugenia Rencoret
- Producers: Patricio López; Mauricio Campos
- Camera setup: Single-camera
- Running time: 45 minutes
- Production company: Televisión Nacional de Chile

Original release
- Network: TVN; TV Chile
- Release: March 15 – September 6, 2010

Related
- Martín Rivas (1970)

Martín Rivas is a Chilean historical drama television series adaptation of the novel of the same name by Alberto Blest Gana, that aired on TVN and TV Chile from March 15, to September 6, 2010, starring Diego Muñoz and María Gracia Omegna.

== Cast ==
=== Main characters ===
- Diego Muñoz as Martín Rivas.
- María Gracia Omegna as Leonor Encina.
- Álvaro Gómez as Clemente Valencia.
- Amparo Noguera as Engracia Nuñez.
- Paz Bascuñán as Mercedes Rivas.
- Héctor Morales as Captain Ricardo Castaños.
- Andrés Reyes as Amador Molina.

=== Supporting characters ===
- Mauricio Pesutic as Dámaso Encina.
- Pablo Cerda as Rafael San Luis.
- Ignacia Baeza as Matilde Elías
- Álvaro Espinoza as Agustín Encina
- Alejandro Trejo as Fidel Elías
- Berta Lasala as Clara San Luis
- Josefina Velasco as Francisca Encina
- Delfina Guzmán as Candelaria Urbina
- Luis Alarcón as Pedro San Luis
- Solange Lackington as Bernarda Cordero
- Adela Secall as Edelmira Molina
- Alejandra Vega as Adelaida Molina
- Emilio Edwards as Hans Schultz
- Carolina Arredondo as Lidia Fuentes
- Roberto Prieto as Eusebio Pérez
- Mireya Moreno as Etelvina González
- Andrea Elitit as Peta Gómez

=== Guest appearances ===
- Nicolás Poblete as Emilio Mendoza
- Sebastián Layseca as Mariano Lobos
- Óscar Hernández as Arzobispo de Santiago
- Hugo Vásquez as Coronel Valdenegro
- Pancho González as Doctor de Clemente

== Reception ==
=== Television ratings ===
Ibope Media Ratings (Chile)
| Original broadcast date | | Day rank | Viewership |
|---|---|---|---|
| Series premiere | March 15, 2010 | 1st | 17% |
| Series finale | September 6, 2010 | 1st | 26% |
| Average | | | 18.1% |
