= My Last Round =

- Film poster
- Spanish: Mi último round
- Directed by: Julio Jorquera
- Starring: Roberto Farías; Héctor Morales
- Release dates: October 2010 (Valdivia); 14 June 2012
- Running time: 110 minutes
- Countries: Chile; Argentina
- Language: Spanish

My Last Round (Spanish: Mi último round) is a 2010 Chilean-Argentine drama film directed by Julio Jorquera. The film premiered at the 2010 Valdivia International Film Festival.

== Plot ==
A love story between a boxer (played by Roberto Farías) and a young kitchen assistant (played by Héctor Morales) begins in southern Chile. When discouragement becomes a part of their lives, they set out on a journey to the capital in hopes of making their dream come true. The struggle for an opportunity can either be a way out or, ultimately, their last chance.

== Cast ==
- Roberto Farías as Octavio
- Héctor Morales as Hugo
- Manuela Martelli as Jennifer
- Tamara Acosta as Matilde
- Yamila Reyna as Ximena
- Alejandro Trejo as Don Carlos
- Luis Dubó as Emiliano
- Gonzalo Robles as Don Chalo
- Ariel Mateluna as Lanza
