= Catalina Vera =

Chilean actor

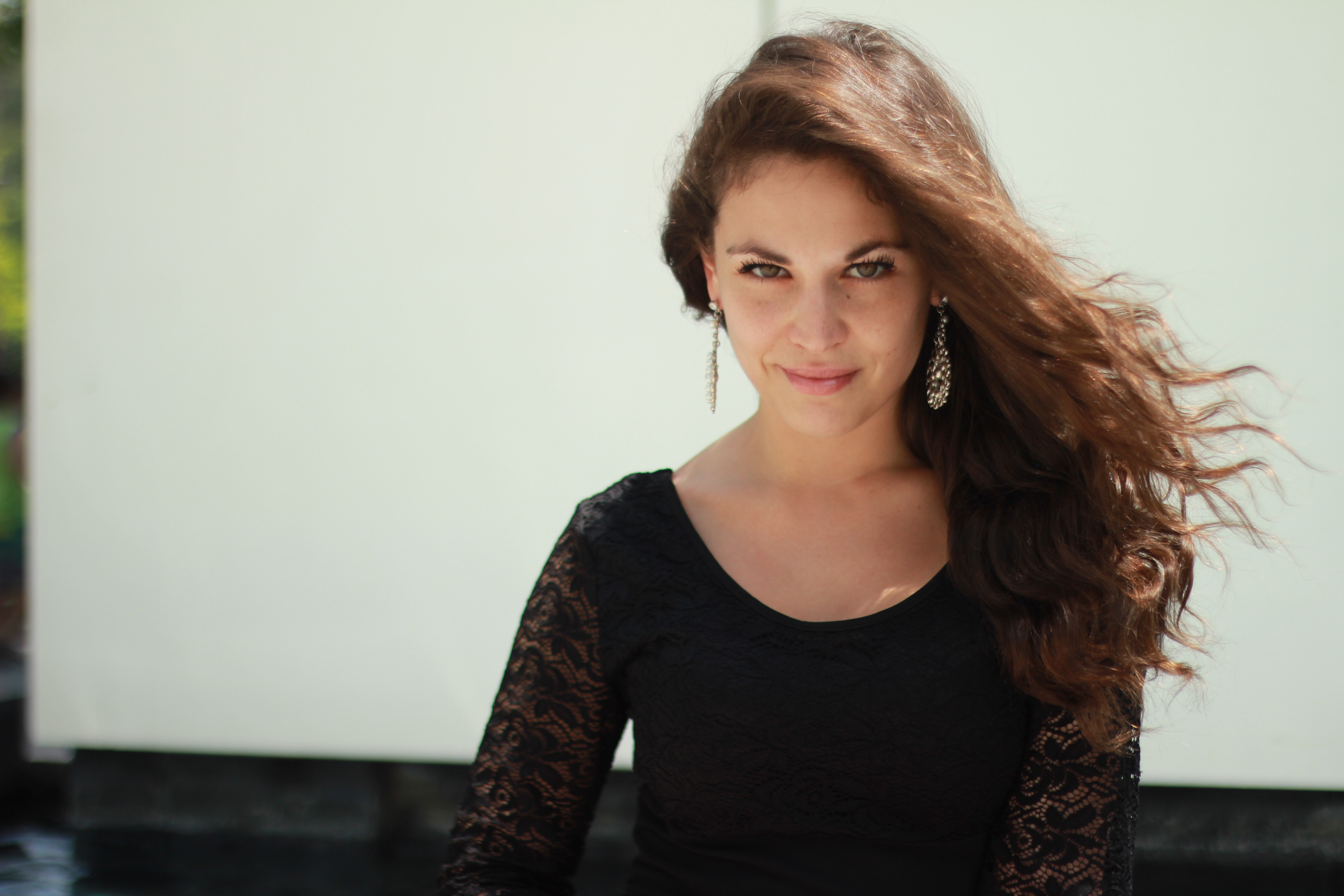
- Born: Catalina Andrea Vera Cordero; 1 November 1987 (age 38); Santiago, Chile
- Occupations: Actress, producer, model
- Years active: 2006–present
- Spouse: Nicolás Soletic (m. 2016)

Catalina Vera Cordero (Santiago, 1 November 1987) is a Chilean film and television actress, model, dancer and producer. Known mainly for being the winner of Cabaret Burlesque, having played Ingrid Parra in Vuelve temprano of TVN, and her performances in Verdades Ocultas, Directo al corazón and lo que callamos las mujeres.

== Biography ==
Catalina was born into a middle-class family in Santiago (Chile), daughter of Héctor Vera, a medical technologist and Jacquelinne Cordero, a pshychoterapist. Her name is inspired by queen Catherine the Great.

As a child she attended the Santa Catalina Labouré school and later the Mayor school of Peñalolén. Motivated by her parents, she took classes in Flamenco, Literature, Drawing, Contemporary Dance, Modeling and Bellydance.

She was soon attracted to the world of acting, especially from the time she participated in musicals such as "Cat's", "Chicago", and "Moulin Rouge" at her school.

Finished the school she decided to be an actress to be able to reach her dream, to be an worldwide recognized actress. Catalina studied acting for four in thet Duoc UC and the University of the Americas, where she received a degree in Actress with a Mention in Performing Arts. After she finished the university, traveled to the United States to perform a workshop in Hollywood, iPop LA, at Roosevelt Hotel, California. With the acquired knowledge, she opened, together with his family, an arts academy, the "Al-Safirah" academy, in Chile. In addition to doing works for children and adults, he taught classes about everything she had learned about hers life.

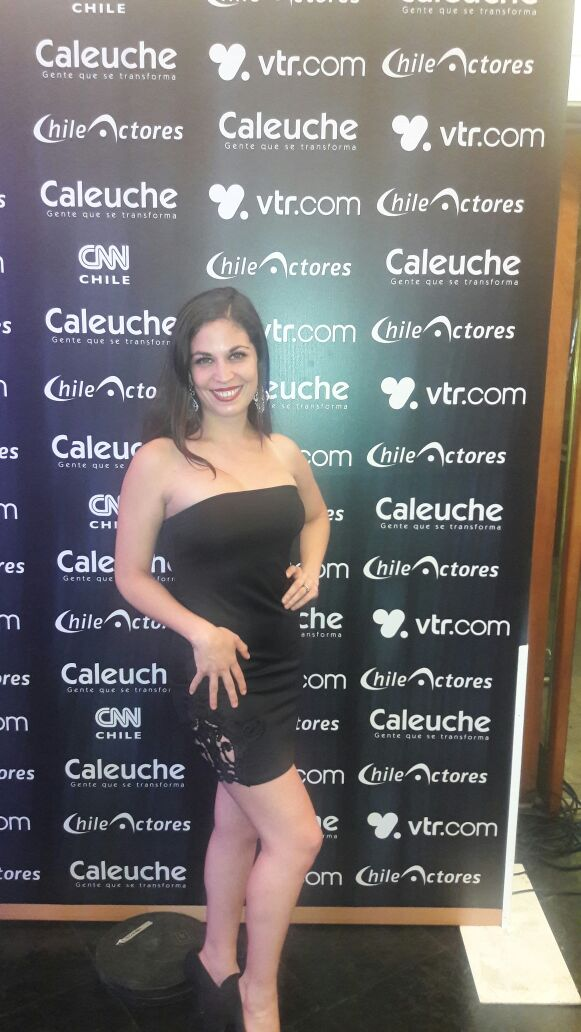
Catalina Vera in the Caleuche Awards in 2017

The first interpretive appearance of Catalina in television was in the program "Pasiones" of TVN, to then not stop more until now, unfolding very naturally among her characters.

The big step for the actress was when she won "Cabaret Burlesque", a talent show that was looking for the best Chilean Vedette. Among a thousand participants, Catalina win the first place, transforming her life towards feathers, glamor, heels and shine. She traveled to France, since that was her prize plus, with a significant amount of money, and she formed his first Varieté called "Cabarieté", invited by the director Patricio Munita, where she meets the Vedette of the Bim Bam Bum "Maggie Lay". Catalina interpreted the nocturnal TV series "Vuelve Temprano", where she played "Ingrid Parra", who was pregnant with the protagonist and acquiring a lot of fame, hers character grew to become in a fundamental character of the central plot.

Jorrit Smink, a Dutch filmmaker, invited her to participate in "Lo Siento Laura", a film that would initially be interactive, with five hundred scenes, thirty finals, all this available on YouTube. But Jorrit thought that it was better to start with a traditional film and then upload the other options to the internet, for which Catalina was seen on the big screen with her character "Lily", Laura's best friend. They won the first place in the Film Festival in Venezuela, second place in the Cinema Film Festival of Texas, and premiered for the first time at the Comedy Cluj Film Festival in Romania, where they participated in their first red carpet.

Upon his return to Chile, she participated in the videoclip "Tienes Miedo" of the renowned national group Megapuesta, in order to later take part in several highly successful programs such as: Irreversible, Pobre Gallo, Lo que callamos las mujeres and his recent participation as Marisol Sanchez in the TV series Verdades Ocultas, she has also been invited to several TV shows, being for a time a panelist of the live program The Lao.

== Filmography ==
=== Film ===
Year	Title	Role	Country
2006	Rojo (La Película)	Dancer	Chile
2012	No	Secretary	Chile
2016	Lo Siento Laura	Lili	Chile

=== Shorts ===
Year	Title	Role	Country
2015	Una Noche de Brujas	Lys	Chile
2018	Nounours	Andrea	Chile

=== Televisión ===
==== Telenovelas ====
Year	Title	Role	Channel
2012	La Sexóloga	Announcer	Chilevisión
2014	Vuelve temprano	Ingrid Parra	TVN
2014	Soltera otra vez	Buyer Woman	Channel 13
2016	Pobre Gallo	Noemi	Mega
2017	Dime quién fue	Macarena Arancibia	TVN
2018	Verdades Ocultas	Marisol Sanchez	Mega
2018	Pacto de sangre	Melany	Channel 13

==== Series ====
Year	Title	Role	Channel
2006–2008	Pasiones	Several main characters	TVN
2009	El Diario de Eva	Several main characters	Chilevisión
2011–2016	Directo al Corazón	Several main characters	Channel 13
2012	La Dimensión Rossa	Various Characters	TVN
2012	Gordis	Nerd Woman	Chilevisión
2013	Los Caremona	Daughter	La Red
2013–2018	Lo que callamos las mujeres	Several main characters	Chilevisión
2014	Roommates	Stripper	HBO
2015	Código Rosa	Several main characters	Mega
2016	Por Ti	Several main characters	TVN
2017	Irreversible	Several main characters	Channel 13
2017	Abrazar la vida	Several main characters	Channel 13
2018	Efecto Mariposa	Paulina Fernández	Mega

==== Reality shows and contest programs ====
Year	Title	Role	Channel
2009	Hombre al agua	Contestant	TVN
2010	Combate estelar	Contestant	Chilevisión
2012	Cabaret Burlesque	Contestant (Winner)	TVN
2015	Talento Chileno	Contestant	Chilevisión
2015	Amor sin banderas	Guest Judge	Channel 13

==== TV shows ====
Year	Title	Role	Channel
2013	Conecta2	Guest	TVN
2013	Raíces Árabes	Guest	ViVe
2013	Mas Vale Tarde	Guest (3 times)	La Red
2013	Aló Rastro Bar	Guest	El Rastro
2013–2015	Mentiras Verdaderas	Guest (2 times)	Chilevisión
2015	Nico Late	Guest	ViVe
2015	Siganme los buenos	Guest	ViVe
2016	Viral, luces y sombras de la web	Protagonist	TVN
2016	El show después del late	Guest	ViVe
2016	Mucho Gusto	Guest (3 times)	Mega
2016	Bienvenidos	Guest (2 times)	Channel 13
2017	Vida fit	Guest	ViVe
2018	The Lao	Panelist	ViVe
2018	La divina comida	Guest	Chilevisión
2018	Toc Show	Guest (2 times)	
2018	¿Y qué pasó?	Guest	Vía X
2018	No eres tú, soy yo	Guest (2 times)	Zona Latina

== Music videos ==
Year	Title	Band
2012	Malefactor Manifiesto	Thornafire
2016	Tienes Miedo	Megapuesta

== Commercial Announcements ==
- Next (lácteos) (2012) – Protagonist
- AFP Capital Escáner Previsional (AFP) (2013) – Protagonist
- ACHS (2013) -
- TuSi (2016) – Protagonist

== Awards ==
- Winner of the TV-show Cabaret Burlesque 2012
