= Catalina Guerra =

Chilean actress

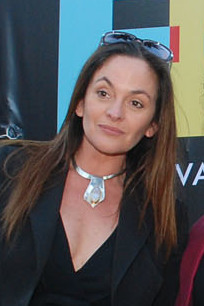
- Catalina Guerra in 2011
- Born: Catalina Guerra Münchmeyer; 19 August 1969 (age 57); Santiago de Chile,
- Occupation: Actress

Catalina Guerra Münchmeyer (Santiago de Chile, 19 August 1969) is a Chilean actress of theater, films and television.

== Life ==
Born in a family of actors. She is the second daughter of Jorge Guerra (1942–2009), a prominent actor and theater director known for his character Pin Pon, and Gloria Münchmeyer (1938–), a prominent actress.

She began her acting career in 1990 on Channel 13, followed by some successful roles, in Acércate más (1990), Ellas porlas (1991), Love at home (1995), Adrenalina (1996) and Wild beach (1997).

As of 1999, she only appeared in soap operas produced by Televisión Nacional de Chile. Her career prospects began to improve when she starred in Coven (1999), Holy Thief (2000) Amores de mercado (2001), Purasangre (2002) and Destinations crossed (2004). Her performances received good reviews on the state channel, which allowed her to star in the sitcom Hotel para dos (2007). Although Guerra had become one of TVN's most diverse supporting actresses, her contract ended in 2007.

In 2010, she co-starred with Fernanda Urrejola in the drama Mujeres de lujo de Chilevisión, playing a lesbian who practices luxury prostitution in an exclusive club. The bet received great acceptance in the audience.

Between 2010 and 2017, she regularly participated in Channel 13 castings, under an exclusive contract. In 2010, she headed First Lady, along with Julio Milostich (being the winner of the best supporting actress at the Fotech Awards), between 2011 and 2017 she participated in the phenomenon Single Again, for three seasons and later made interventions of the cast de Las Vega's (2013), Chipe libre (2014) and Veinteañero a los 40 (2016).

In 2018 she signed with AGTV Producciones to participate in La reina de Franklin (2018) and Amor a la Catalán (2019).

== Filmography ==
=== Films ===
Films
Año	Título	Rol
1992	Los agentes de la KGB también se enamoran	Kathy
1998	Gringuito	Camila
1998	Cielo ciego	Malena
2003	Sexo con amor	Angélica
2005	Padre Nuestro	Prostituta
2007	Normal con Alas	Pía Hamilton
2008	Muñeca	Pedro's mom
2009	Teresa	Luz Victoria Montt
2009	El baile de la Victoria	Viuda
2009	Super, todo chile adentro	Clienta Standard
2018	Calzones rotos	Matilde
2018	American Huaso	

=== Telenovelas ===
Telenovelas
Año	Título	Papel
1990	Acércate más	Bettina
1991	Ellas por ellas	Myriam Ferrada
1992	Fácil de amar	Amanda Bascur
1993	Doble juego	Guacolda
1994	Top secret	Carolina Mena
1995	Amor a domicilio	Fernanda Valdés
1996	Adrenalina	Francisca Undurraga
1997	Playa Salvaje	Paulina Cáceres
1999	Aquelarre	Silvana Montes
2000	Santo ladrón	Paula Cortés
2001	Amores de mercado	Antonia Altamira
2002	Purasangre	Margot Rebolledo
2003	Pecadores	Sofía Reinoso
2004	Destinos Cruzados	Maribel Menchaca
2005	Los Treinta	Karen Irigoyen
2005	Amor en tiempo récord	María Elena Belmar
2006	Cómplices	Marcia Otero
2007	Corazón de María	Lucía Collado
2009	Mujeres de lujo	Angélica Vargas / Perla
2010	Primera dama	Bruna San Juan
2012–2018	Soltera otra vez	Milena Simunovic
2013	Las Vega's	Rocío Muñoz
2014	Chipe libre	Antonieta Hernández
2015	20añero a los 40	Cynthia Espinoza
2017	La colombiana	Marta Lisperguer
2018	La reina de Franklin	Magnolia Jorquera
2019	Amor a la Catalán	Isabel Cruzat
2021	Verdades ocultas	Agustina Mackenna
2025	El jardín de Olivia	Bernarda Vial
2026	La baronesa	Andrea Núñez

=== TV series ===
TV Series
Año	Título	Papel
1991	Mediomundo	
1995	Soltero a la medida	
1996	Vecinos puertas adentro	Mónica González de la Carta
2001	Oveja negra	
2003	La vida es una lotería	Marina
2005	Tiempo final	Pamela
2006	Justicia para todos	Rebeca
2007	Hotel para dos	Rosa Morales
2008	Camera Café	Victoria Valdivieso
2008	Paz	Elvira Santa María
2008	Comedor de diario	Eva Klein
2009	Mis años grossos	Victoria Molina
2013	El hombre de tu vida	Estela
2014	La canción de tu vida	Marcela
