= La reina de Franklin =

Chilean telenovela

- Title card
- Genre: Telenovela
- Created by: Pablo Ávila; Nelson Pedrero
- Written by: Carlos Galofré; Luis López-Aliaga; Rodrigo Ossandón; Adela Boltansky; Simón Soto
- Directed by: Diego Rougier
- Starring: Francisco Pérez-Bannen; Javiera Contador; Claudia Di Girolamo
- Theme music composer: Egon Steger
- Opening theme: "I'm Your Boogie Man" by KC and the Sunshine Band
- Country of origin: Chile
- Original language: Spanish
- No. of seasons: 1
- No. of episodes: 97

Production
- Executive producers: Matías Ovalle; Pablo Ávila
- Producer: Cecilia Aguirre
- Production locations: Santiago, Chile
- Cinematography: Veronica Siña
- Editor: Cristóbal Díaz
- Running time: 30 minutes (approx.)
- Production companies: AGTV Producciones; Grupo Secuoya

Original release
- Network: Canal 13
- Release: November 19, 2018 – May 2, 2019

Related
- Valió la pena; Amor a la Catalán

La reina de Franklin (lit. The Queen of Franklin) is a Chilean telenovela produced by AGTV Producciones and Grupo Secuoya and broadcast by Canal 13 from November 19, 2018, to May 2, 2019.

== Cast ==
=== Main cast ===
- Javiera Contador as Yolanda "Yoli" Garrido
- Claudia Di Girolamo as Julia Tocornal
- Francisco Pérez-Bannen as Franklin "Frank" Ulloa
- Mónica Godoy as Camila Ossa
- Daniel Alcaíno as Arturo Marabolí
- Susana Hidalgo as Diana Poblete
- Nicolás Poblete as Eduardo "Lalo" Marabolí
- Felipe Contreras as Bruno "Moái" Silva
- Catalina Guerra as Magnolia Jorquera

=== Supporting cast ===
- Jaime Omeñaca as Eusebio Rojas
- Josefina Velasco as Berta Fernández
- María Elena Duvauchelle as Violeta Palacios
- Carolina Arredondo as María Conchita Canales
- Nicolás Brown as Joel Valderrama
- Catalina Castelblanco as Estefanía "Steffy" Poblete
- Ariel Mateluna as Alberto "Tato" Tobar
- Belén Soto as Valentina Ulloa
- Francisco Dañobeitía as Cristóbal Ulloa
- Vivianne Dietz as Lourdes Rojas
- Josefina Nast as Grace Poblete
- Rafael de la Reguera as David Rojas
- Steevens Benjamin as Cedric Eche
- Rodrigo Vásquez as El "Fostorito"

=== Special participation ===
- Sergio Hernández as Elías Garrido
- Malucha Pinto as Victoria Hidalgo
- Teresa Münchmeyer as Teresita Herrera
- Gustavo Becerra as Becerra, Mayor de Carabineros
