= Cristián Campos =

Chilean actor

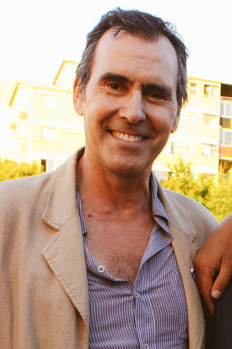
- Born: 31 August 1956 (age 69); Punta Arenas, Chile
- Occupations: Actor, director
- Years active: 1979–present

Juan Cristián Campos Sallato (Punta Arenas, 31 August 1956) is a Chilean actor and director of theater, film and television.

== Career ==
He served as Chilean cultural attaché in the city of Washington, a position in which he was appointed by President Michelle Bachelet (2006–2010).

He is the son of Javier Abraham Campos Pastor and Sara Sallato Pouchucq, studied at the School of Theater of the Pontificia Universidad Católica de Chile. He participated in several commercials between 1977 and 1980, where he was the leading figure in the soft drink Pepsi. He acted in the first Chilean version of the rock opera Jesus Christ Superstar in 1981. Then he debuted in telenovelas in the classic La madrastra (1981), in which he stood out with his character as "Greco", a teacher famous for his stuttering. He has played many main roles, the most remembered is Chronicle of a Holy Man in 1990, where he played Alberto Hurtado, a Chilean Jesuit saint priest and in 2005 he participated in the production Alberto: Who knows how much it costs to make a buttonhole?.

Campos has been established as one of the most successful actors in television for the last 40 years. After La madrastra, he acted in many successful productions such as Los títeres (1984), Ángel Malo (1986), Amor a domicilio (1995), Adrenalina (1996), Playa salvaje (1997), Marparaíso (1998), Cerro alegre (1999), and many more. In 2003, he starred in Machos where his role was the eldest son of Ángel Mercader, Alonso, who falls in love with the sweet and beautiful Sonia (Carolina Arregui), who had been the lover of his father for more than 10 years.

In 2010, he recorded for Channel 13 the TV series Feroz, which marked his return to telenovelas, where he played Guillermo. After almost 40 years in Canal 13, he signed for Mega in 2020.

He is married to fellow actress María José Prieto since 2009, and was married to Claudia di Girolamo from 1984 to 1995.

== Filmography ==
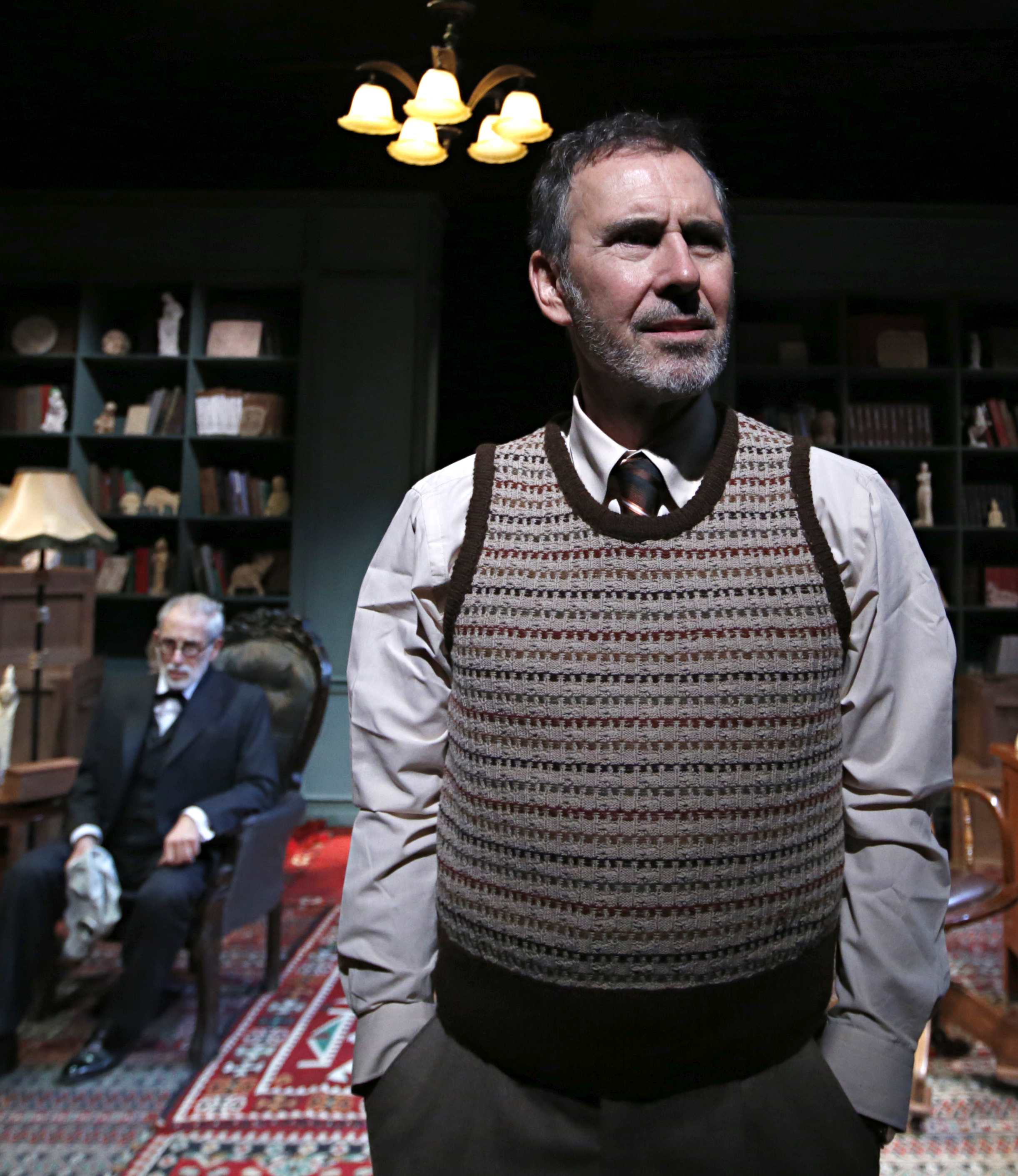
Campos on stage along with Héctor Noguera in "Freud's last session" on Universidad Católica theater in 2019.

=== Films ===
Films
Year	Film	Character
1985	Sexto A 1965	Félix
1987	Sussi	Doctor
1993	Johnny cien pesos	Abogado Beaucheff
2001	Te amo (Made in Chile)	Padre de Isabel
2004	Mujeres Infieles	Alberto Valdés
2005	Alberto: ¿quién sabe cuánto cuesta hacer un ojal?	Alberto Hurtado Cruchaga
2007	The Black Pimpernel	Coronel Espinoza
2011	Los 33 de San José	Mining minister
2012	Bahía Azul	Mario
2014	The 33	Hurtado
2016	Neruda	Police director
2018	El Taller	

=== Telenovelas ===
Year	Title	Character	Channel
1981	La madrastra	Greco Molina	Canal 13
1982	Alguien por quién vivir	Juan José Elizalde	Canal 13
1983	La noche del cobarde	Diego Fontaine	Canal 13
1984	Los títeres	Hugo González	Canal 13
1985	La trampa	Luis Miguel Sanfuentes	Canal 13
1986	Ángel malo	Ricardo Álvarez	Canal 13
1986	Secreto de familia	Andrés Cruces	Canal 13
1989	Bravo	Jorge Miranda	Canal 13
1990	Acércate más	Néstor Heredia	Canal 13
1991	Ellas por ellas	Simón Andrade	Canal 13
1992	Fácil de amar	Renato Moncada	Canal 13
1993	Doble juego	Heriberto Peña/ Eric Peñablanca	Canal 13
1994	Top secret	Santiago Mena Ruiz	Canal 13
1995	Amor a domicilio	Miguel Díaz	Canal 13
1996	Adrenalina	Esteban Mardones	Canal 13
1997	Playa salvaje	Mariano Acuña O'Reilly	Canal 13
1998	Marparaíso	Iván Andrade	Canal 13
1999	Cerro Alegre	Adriano Ferrer	Canal 13
2000	Corazón pirata	Francisco "Pancho" Torres	Canal 13
2003	Machos	Alonso Mercader	Canal 13
2004–2005	Tentación	Marco Donoso	Canal 13
2005–2006	Gatas y tuercas	Max San Juan	Canal 13
2010	Feroz	Guillermo Bernard	Canal 13
2010	Primera dama	Marco Cruz	Canal 13
2011–2012	Peleles	Felipe "Pipe" Tagle	Canal 13
2013	Las Vega's	José Luis "Coto" Bravo	Canal 13
2013–2014	Secretos en el jardín	Hernán Jerez	Canal 13
2014–2015	Chipe libre	César Ruiz	Canal 13
2016–2017	Preciosas	Arturo Márquez	Canal 13
2018	Soltera otra vez 3	Miguel Valencia	Canal 13
2018–2019	Pacto de sangre	Hernán Errázuriz	Canal 13
2019–2020	Amor a la Catalán	Fernando Catalán/ Federico "Coyote" Undurraga	Canal 13
2020	100 días para enamorarse	Ignacio	Mega
2021	Verdades ocultas	Tomás Valencia	Mega

=== TV Series ===
TV series
Year	Series	Role	Channel
1975	La princesa Panchita		TVN
1982	Una familia feliz	Martín	Canal 13
1990	Crónica de un Hombre Santo	San Alberto Hurtado	Canal 13
1993	La Patrulla del Desierto	Javier Rozas	Canal 13
1996	Amor a domicilio, la comedia	Miguel Díaz	Canal 13
1996	Vecinos puertas adentro	Luis Felipe	Canal 13
2013	Prófugos 2	Pedro Murillo	HBO
2017	Neruda, la serie	Director de Carabineros	Mega
