= Chipe libre =

2014 Chilean television series

- Title card
- Genre: Drama; Comedy
- Written by: Carla Stagno; José Fonseca; Pablo Toro; Anneke Munita
- Directed by: Herval Abreu; Roberto Rebolledo
- Starring: Fernanda Urrejola; Nicolás Poblete
- Opening theme: "Nada fue un error" by Fernanda Urrejola, Juanita Ringeling and Nicolás Poblete
- Country of origin: Chile
- Original language: Spanish
- No. of episodes: 97

Production
- Executive producer: Herval Abreu
- Producers: Alejandra Gárate; Bernandita Mossó
- Production locations: Santiago, Chile
- Running time: 55-60 minutes

Original release
- Network: Canal 13
- Release: August 3, 2014 – January 26, 2015

Related
- Secretos en el Jardín; Veinteañero a los 40

Chipe libre (lit: Free Opportunity) is a Chilean comedy television series created by Carla Stagno, José Fonseca, Pablo Toro, and Anneke Munita, that was broadcast on Canal 13, from August 3, 2014, to January 26, 2015, starring Fernanda Urrejola and Nicolás Poblete as Julieta and Gonzalo, a couple whose tumultuous feelings for each other finally make them bored, and separately with a "Free Opportunity" agreement, they need to rebuild his life from zero.

== Cast ==
=== Main characters ===
- Fernanda Urrejola as Julieta Ruiz.
- Nicolás Poblete as Gonzalo Hernández.
- Juanita Ringeling as Sofía Villaroel (alias Rucia).
- Mario Horton as Franco Zanetti.
- Carolina Varleta as Bernandita Patiño / Macarena Vergara.
- Javiera Díaz de Valdés as Isabel Urrejola.
- Loreto Aravena as Catalina Pardo.
- Pablo Macaya as Cristóbal Ramos (alias Crili).

=== Supporting characters ===
- Elvira Cristi as Bárbara Andrade.
- Gloria Münchmeyer as Violeta Riesco.
- Jaime Vadell as Germán Hernández.
- Catalina Guerra as Antonieta Hernández.
- Héctor Morales as Axel Ulloa.
- Solange Lackington as Irene Olivares.
- Cristián Campos as César Ruiz.
- Luciana Echeverría as Diana Lagos.
- Pablo Schwarz as Carlos Loyola (alias Sangría).
- Luis Gnecco as Ricardo Felman.
- Teresa Münchmeyer as Paty Navarrete.
- Felipe Pinto as Lucas Ruiz.
- Carolina López as Janis Ortiz.
- Fedra Vergara as Tania Zanetti.

== Reception ==
=== Television ratings ===
Kantar Ibope Media Ratings (Chile)
Original broadcast date		Day rank	Viewership
Series premiere	August 3, 2014	-	15,8%
Series finale	January 26, 2015	-	12,1%
Average			9,7%

== International broadcast ==
- El Salvador: Canal 21.
