= Paz Bascuñán =

Chilean actress (born 1975)

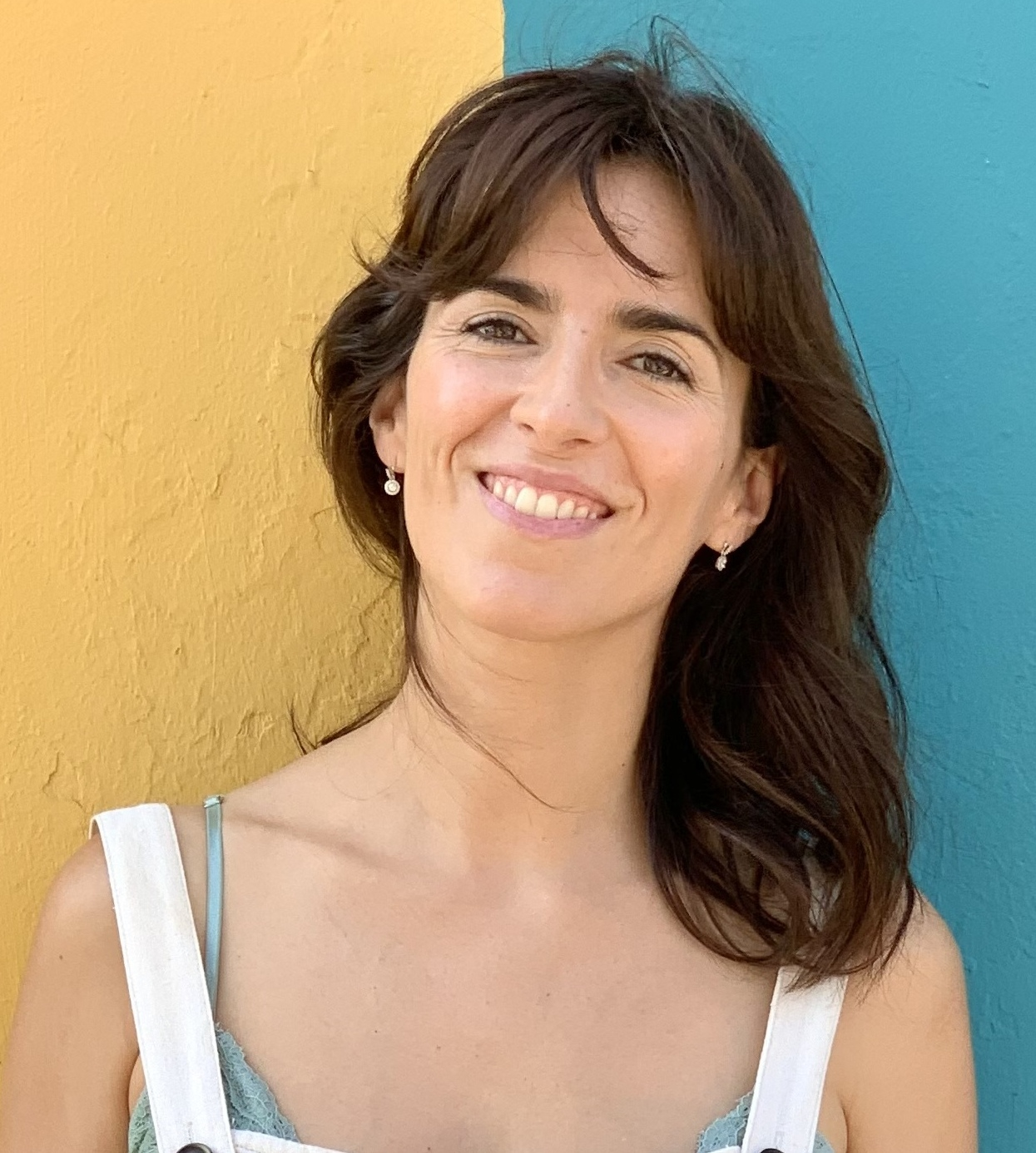
- Bascuñán in 2024
- Born: María Paz Bascuñán Aylwin; 2 June 1975 (age 51); Santiago de Chile, Chile
- Education: Pontifical Catholic University of Chile
- Occupation: Actress
- Spouse: Miguel Asensio (2008-present)
- Children: 2

María Paz Bascuñán Aylwin (Spanish pronunciation: [ˈpas βaskuˈɲan], 2 June 1975), commonly known as Paz Bascuñán, is a Chilean theatre, film and television actress. Daughter of politician Mariana Aylwin and granddaughter of Chile's former president Patricio Aylwin, and has more than two descents, her Basque descent being recognized in 2002.

== Biography ==
She studied theatre in Universidad Católica de Chile and made her debut in Cerro Alegre from canal 13 (1999). In 2001, she made an appearance in the telenovela Piel Canela (2001) from canal 13 together with the protagonist Benjamin Vicuña.

In 2003, she switched to TVN with the telenovela Puertas Adentro (2004). She took the role of the daughter of a businessman, Javiera Martinez, who falls in love with a normal guy Jonathan Cárdenas (Ricardo Fernández) and she becomes pregnant, Los Pincheira (2004), Los Capo (2005), Cómplices (2006), Corazón de María (2007) and more recently in Viuda Alegre (2008).

In theater she became famous with the show Esa relación tan delicada (2002–2005) from the French author Loleh Bellon.

Her cinema appearances have been: Pretendiendo (2006) directed by Claudio Dabed, Santos (2007) directed by Nicolás López and Normal con Alas (2007) directed by Coca Gómez.

== Filmography ==
=== Telenovelas ===
- 1999 – Cerro Alegre (Canal 13) - Heidi Astudillo
- 2001 – Piel Canela (Canal 13) - Marcela Moreno
- 2003 – Puertas Adentro (TVN) - Javiera Martínez
- 2004 – Los Pincheira (TVN) - Trinidad Molina
- 2005 – Los Capo (TVN) - Millarhaü
- 2006 – Cómplices (TVN) - Francisca Durán
- 2007 – Corazón de María (TVN) - Yasna Ceballos
- 2008 – Viuda Alegre (TVN)- Sofia Valdevenito
- 2009 – Los exitosos Pells (TVN) - Daniela Caminero
- 2010 – Martín Rivas (TVN) - Mercedes Rivas
- 2012/2014 – Soltera otra vez (Canal 13) - Cristina Moreno
- 2016/2017 – Preciosas (Canal 13) - Frida Segovia / Estrella Anís
- 2020 – S.O.S. MAMIS - Trini
- 2021 – Demente - Teresa Betancourt

=== Films ===
- 2006 – Pretendiendo - Fernanda
- 2007 – Santos - Presentadora telediario
- 2007 – Normal con Alas - Pascuala Cortazar
- 2010 – Que pena tu vida - Mariana Vargas
- 2012 – Aftershock - Pregnant woman
- 2013 – The Green Inferno - Lucia
- 2016 – Sin Filtro - Pía Vargas
- 2018 – No estoy loca - Carolina
- 2019 – Dulce familia - Ale
- 2020 – Cosas de Hombres - Nati
- 2022 - S.O.S. Mamis: La película - Trini
- 2022 Me vuelves Loca - Silvia
- 2023 - S.O.S. Mamis 2: Mosquita muerta - Trini

=== Series ===
- 2004 – Loco Por Ti (TVN)
- 2004 – La Vida es una Lotería (TVN) - Mechita
- 2009 – Una pareja dispareja (TVN) - Cassandra
