= Veinteañero a los 40 =

- Title card
- Genre: Drama
- Created by: Sergio Díaz
- Written by: Sergio Díaz; Adela Boltansky; José Fonseca; Diego Niño; Carla Stagno; Rodrigo Urrutia
- Directed by: Germán Barriga
- Creative director: Ignacio Arnold
- Starring: Francisco Pérez-Bannen; Tamara Acosta; Pablo Macaya
- Opening theme: "El Perdón" by Nicky Jam feat. Enrique Iglesias
- Country of origin: Chile
- Original language: Spanish
- No. of episodes: 93

Production
- Executive producers: Vania Portilla; Herval Abreu
- Production locations: Santiago, Chile
- Running time: 60-80 minutes

Original release
- Network: Canal 13
- Release: January 3 – July 26, 2016

Related
- Chipe Libre; Preciosas

Veinteañero a los 40 (lit: Twenty-something at age 40) is a Canal 13-produced Chilean television series broadcast from January 3 to July 26, 2016. It stars Francisco Pérez-Bannen, Tamara Acosta, Pablo Macaya, Silvia Santelices, Fernanda Urrejola, Karla Melo and Catalina Guerra, along with Alejandro Trejo, Luis Gnecco and Patricia López.

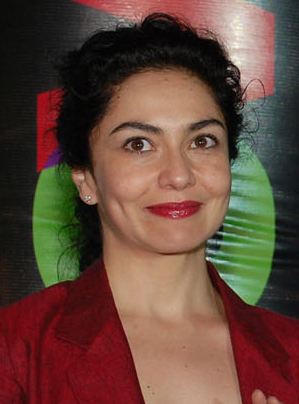
Tamara Acosta.

== Cast ==
=== Main characters ===
- Francisco Pérez-Bannen as Francisco Javier Bustamante Lynch (alias Pancho)
  - Max Salgado as young Francisco Bustamante
- Tamara Acosta as Rafaela Guerra Peñafiel (alias Rafa)
  - Katherine Muñoz as young Rafaela Guerra
- Pablo Macaya as Alejandro Toro (alias Jano)
  - Matías Burgos as young Alejandro Toro
- Fernanda Urrejola as Katia Jorquera

=== Supporting characters ===
Related to Bustamante family

- Silvia Santelices as Ester Lynch de Bustamante
- Sigrid Alegría as Fátima Bustamante Lynch de Garcés
- Néstor Cantillana as Eliseo Garcés Fuentealba
- Catalina Castelblanco as Isidora Garcés Bustamante
- Catalina Benítez as Agustina Garcés Bustamante
- Patricia López as Janín Díaz
- Lux Pascal as Valentín
- Eyal Meyer as Aquiles Cohen

Related to Alejandro and Rafaela family

- Hernán Contreras as Gabriel Toro-Bustamante Guerra (alias Gabo)
- Jaime Artus as Bastian Toro-Bustamante Guerra
- Alejandro Trejo as Alberto Guerra (alias Tito)
- Catalina Guerra as Cynthia Mercedes Espinoza
  - Rocío Toscano as young Cynthia Espinoza
- Catalina González as Virginia
- Claudio Castellón as Jonathan Cubillos (alias Palanca)
- Andrés Commentz as Tomás Toro Basáez (alias Tommy)
- Constanza Piccoli as Nicole Basáez
- Karla Melo as Alison Mercedes Espinoza
- Katyna Huberman as Jackie Munita

Related to Cristián Grez company

- Luis Gnecco as Cristián Grez
- Ariel Levy as Oliver Grez
- Daniela Nicolás as Gracia Montero Rojas
- Aída Escuredo as Maya Zulueta

=== Guest appearances ===
- Yann Yvin as himself
- Consuelo Holzapfel as Abbess
- Cristián Campos as Raúl Bustamante
- Liliana García as M.D. Sara Parker
- Gabriela Medina as Violeta
- Nissim Sharim as Francoise
- John Serrano as Shakiro

== Reception ==
=== Television ratings ===
Kantar Ibope Media Ratings (Chile)
Original broadcast date		Day rank	Viewership
Series premiere	January 3, 2016	2nd	17,2%
Series finale	July 26, 2016	10th	12,4%
Average			9,1%

== International broadcast ==
- Ecuador: Telerama (2016).
