= S.O.S. Mamis: La película =

- Amazon Prime Video release poster
- Directed by: Gabriela Sobarzo
- Written by: Mirella Granucci; Aníbal Herrera
- Produced by: Miguel Asensio
- Starring: Loreto Aravena; Paz Bascuñán; Tamara Acosta; Mane Swett; Jenny Cavallo
- Cinematography: Diego Macho
- Edited by: Diego Macho Gómez
- Music by: Manuel Riveiro
- Production company: Tiki Pictures
- Distributed by: Amazon Prime Video
- Release date: March 18, 2022
- Running time: 105 minutes
- Country: Chile
- Language: Spanish

S.O.S. Mamis: La película (lit. 'S.O.S. Mommies: The Movie') is a 2022 Chilean comedy film directed by Gabriela Sobarzo and written by Mirella Granucci & Aníbal Herrera. Starring Loreto Aravena, Paz Bascuñán, Tamara Acosta, María Elena Swett and Jenny Cavallo. It is based on the web series S.O.S. Mamis from the production companies Tiki Group and Elefantec Global that serves as a spin-off of it. It premiered on March 18, 2022, on Amazon Prime Video.

== Synopsis ==
Through a WhatsApp group, a group of 5 women comment and gossip about things about their lives and that of their children. Among those talks, the news is given that one of its members has a debt to the school, they all decide to help her, without knowing that the things they will have to do will be absolutely unusual.

== Cast ==
The actors participating in this film are:

- Loreto Aravena as Luna
- Paz Bascuñán as Trini
- Tamara Acosta as Milagros
- María Elena Swett as Julia
- Jenny Cavallo as Clarita
- Ignacia Allamand as María Gracia
- Ricardo Fernández Flores as Chancho
- Marcial Tagle as Andrés
- Igal Furman as Father Anthony
- Cristina Aburto as Director
- Pablo Zúñiga as Hernán
- Lorena Capetillo as Captain
- Edison Díaz as Sublieutenant
- Alondra Venezuela as Greta
- Matteo Sepúlveda Silva as Inti
- Santiago B. Swett as Dante
- Leonor Asensio Bascuñán as Sofía
- Florencia Massardo Cavallo as Blanquita
- Steffi Lutz as Stefanie
- Jaime Bandayrel as James
- Gabriela Sobarzo as Madrina
- Berni Traub as María José
- Carola Krebs as Carla
- Javiera Gallo as Javiera
- Lina Baldessari as Mirella
- Fernando Alé as Raider 1
- Chepo Sepúlveda as Raider 2

== Sequel ==
Following the success of the film, Amazon Prime Video ordered a sequel titled S.O.S. Mamis 2: New Mom on the Block released on August 2, 2023, on the platform.
