= Amor a la Catalán =

- Title card
- Genre: Telenovela
- Created by: Vicente Sabatini; Andrea Franco
- Written by: Camila Villagrán; Marcelo Castañón; Malú Urriola; David Bustos; Hugo Castillo
- Directed by: Vicente Sabatini; Christian Maringer; Manuel Busch
- Starring: Daniela Ramírez; Matías Assler; Tamara Acosta; Cristián Campos; Catalina Guerra; Álvaro Espinoza; Josefina Montané; Loreto Aravena; Renato Münster; Ximena Rivas; Fernando Kliche; Alessandra Guerzoni
- Theme music composer: Egon Steger
- Opening theme: "Descarao" by Maca del Pilar and Bronko Yotte
- Country of origin: Chile
- Original language: Spanish
- No. of episodes: 124

Production
- Executive producers: Matías Ovalle; Pablo Ávila
- Producers: Cecilia Aguirre; Caco Muñoz
- Production locations: Santiago, Chile
- Cinematography: Alberto Gordillo
- Editors: Javier Kappes; Ronald Ravilet; Felipe Lagos
- Running time: 30-45 minutes
- Production company: AGTV Producciones

Original release
- Network: Canal 13
- Release: July 6, 2019 – February 20, 2020

Amor a la Catalán (English: Catalán's Love) is a Chilean telenovela produced by AGTV Producciones and broadcast by Canal 13 from July 6, 2019 to February 20, 2020. The series stars Daniela Ramírez, Matías Assler and Tamara Acosta.

== Cast ==
=== Main cast ===
- Daniela Ramírez as Dafne María Catalán Cabezas
- Matías Assler as Rafael Andrés Catalán Cruzat
- Tamara Acosta as Yanara Carla "Yani" Cabezas Rojas
- Catalina Guerra as Isabel Paz Cruzat Swett
- Cristián Campos as Fernando Manuel Catalán López
- Fernando Kliche as Pedro José Catalán López
- Josefina Montané as Lucía del Pilar Fernández Zabala

=== Supporting cast ===
- Loreto Aravena as Danae del Carmen Catalán Cabezas
- Álvaro Espinoza as Primitivo Mardones Contreras
- Ximena Rivas as Betsy Ruth Mardones Contreras
- Renato Munster as Walter Ruiz
- Alessandra Guerzoni as Ana María Ibáñez
- José Soza as Basilio Mardones Saavedra
- Josefina Velasco as Marta Pacheco
- Gabriel Urzúa as Camilo Gonzalo Pacheco Millán
- Antonio Campos as Lucas Vidal
- Nathalia Aragonese as Charito Mamani
- Francisco Dañobeitía as Diego Catalán Cruzat
- Javiera Mendoza as Tatiana Mardones Mardones
- Lucas Mosquera as Alexander Bedoya
- Erlande Augustin as Sabine Veret
- Carol Matos as Sandra Milena
- Francelis López as Dulce
