= El jardín de Olivia =

- Genre: Telenovela
- Created by: Jonathan Cuchacovich
- Written by: Jonathan Cuchacovich; Sergio Díaz; Patricio Heim; Fernanda Vivado
- Directed by: Víctor Huerta; Matías Stagnaro; Matías Dalmazzo
- Starring: Nicole Espinoza; Francisco Gormaz; Violeta Silva; Begoña Basauri
- Opening theme: "Nunca se olvida" by Siven
- Country of origin: Chile
- Original language: Spanish
- No. of seasons: 3
- No. of episodes: 358

Production
- Executive producers: María Eugenia Rencoret; Pablo Ávila
- Producers: Daniela Demicheli; Cecilia Aguirre
- Camera setup: Multi-camera
- Production company: Megamedia

Original release
- Network: Mega
- Release: March 17, 2025 – August 17, 2026

El jardín de Olivia is a Chilean telenovela created by Jonathan Cuchacovich. It aired on Mega from March 17, 2025 to August 17, 2026. The telenovela stars Nicole Espinoza, Francisco Gormaz, Violeta Silva and Begoña Basauri.

== Synopsis ==
Diana infiltrates a powerful Santiago family as an occupational therapist to investigate her mother's death. While working with Olivia, she uncovers dark secrets that threaten to destroy the Walkers' perfect image.

== Cast ==
- Nicole Espinoza as Diana Guerrero
- Francisco Gormaz as Clemente Walker
- Begoña Basauri as Vanessa Riesco
- César Sepúlveda as Omar Droguett
- Catalina Guerra as Bernarda Vial
- Alejandro Trejo as Luis Emilio Walker
- Francisca Gavilán as Gloria González
- Catalina Castelblanco as Ignacia Walker
- Francisco Dañobeitía as Joaquín Undurraga
- Alonso Quintero as Bastián Walker
- Ricardo Vergara as Ramiro Leiva
- Ignacia Sepúlveda as Jessica Reyes
- Jacinta Rodríguez as Karina Mendoza
- Violeta Silva as Olivia Walker

== Reception ==
=== Ratings ===
Season	Episodes	First aired		Last aired	
Season	Episodes	Date	Rating (in points)	Date	Rating (millions)
1	358	March 17, 2025	10.8	August 17, 2026	0.90

=== Awards and nominations ===
Year	Award	Category	Nominated	Result	Ref
2025	Produ Awards	Best Contemporary Telenovela	El jardín de Olivia	Nominated	
2025	Produ Awards	Best Lead Actress - Contemporary Telenovela	Catalina Guerra	Nominated	
2025	Produ Awards	Best Lead Actor - Contemporary Telenovela	Francisco Gormaz	Nominated	
2025	Produ Awards	Best Supporting Actor - Contemporary Telenovela	Alejandro Trejo	Nominated	
2025	Produ Awards	Best Newcomer Actress / Actor	Violeta Silva	Nominated	
2025	Produ Awards	Best Producer - Superseries or Telenovela	Cecilia Aguirre	Nominated	
