= Isla Paraíso =

- Created by: Alejandro Cabrera
- Written by: Alejandro Cabrera; María José Galleguillos; Valeria Vargas; Luis Emilio Guzmán; José Fonseca
- Directed by: Matias Stagnaro; Enrique Bravo
- Creative directors: Guillermo Murúa; Pedro Miranda
- Starring: Paola Volpato; Francisco Melo; Andrés Velasco
- Opening theme: "Simples Corazones" by Fonseca
- Country of origin: Chile
- Original language: Spanish
- No. of seasons: 1
- No. of episodes: 233

Production
- Executive producer: Daniela Demicheli
- Producer: Verónica Brañes
- Cinematography: Óscar Fuentes
- Editor: Nelson Valdés
- Camera setup: Multi-camera
- Production company: Mega

Original release
- Network: Mega
- Release: October 2, 2018 – September 4, 2019

Isla Paraíso is a Chilean comedy telenovela created by Alejandro Cabrera, that premiered on Mega on October 2, 2018 and ended on September 4, 2019. It stars Paola Volpato, Francisco Melo and Andrés Velasco. Filming of the telenovela began in July 2018 and concluded on 9 August 2019.

The telenovela takes place in Isla Paraíso, a beautiful place located in a remote area, it is a town where only men live, until one day a bus carrying only women arrives, changing the town.

== Plot ==
Carolina is a housewife who is involved in a millionaire scam due to the irresponsible handling of her husband. Persecuted by the police, she flees with her son Andy and her Dominican employee Madelyn, seeking refuge in the convent where her twin sister Celeste lives. However, Celeste cannot help her, since she is leaving for a sacrificed mission in a remote town in southern Chile: Isla Paraíso. The town is located at the end of the world and is only inhabited by men. This condition leads Father Gabriel to make an announcement that has everyone shaken up: a bus full of women will soon arrive, who will come to work, granting them facilities to establish themselves. Thus, the priest thinks, they will return life back into the town that is destined to disappear.

While Father Gabriel is determined to see the town full of women, on the other side is his great critic: Óscar León, a powerful landowner who gives work to most of the men of Isla Paraíso. Óscar has personal reasons for not wanting woman in town. But once they arrive in the area, there is no turning back. Woman arriving to the town include a nun, a Caribbean employee, and a young woman left at the altar. What no one suspects is that Celeste is an impostor, because in reality she is Carolina, the woman persecuted by police, who has managed to escape by taking refuge in Isla Paraíso and posing as her sister. Óscar will become her new enemy because without a doubt, he would be willing to hand her over to the police if he discovered her true identity. Although without realizing it, Óscar also discovers that Carolina is the first woman he has trusted again after many years.

== Cast ==
- Paola Volpato as Carolina Miranda / Celeste Miranda
- Francisco Melo as Óscar León
- Andrés Velasco as Padre Gabriel Riveros
- Nicolás Oyarzún as Franco León
- Montserrat Ballarin as Sofía Stolzenbach
- Fernando Godoy as Juan Luis Farías
- Dayana Amigo as Angelina Yolanda Salazar
- César Caillet as Hernán Sepúlveda
- María José Prieto as Elena Martínez
- Paulo Brunetti as Diego Bandini
- Magdalena Müller as Rosalía Gallegos
- Etienne Bobenrieth as Pablo Arriagada
- Carmen Disa Gutiérrez as Gloria Domínguez
- Fernando Farías as Leonel Toro
- Paulina Hunt as Doris Castillo
- Mabel Farías as Gustava Rioseco
- Francisco Ossa as Carlos Rojas
- Felipe Rojas as Luka Mancini
- Constanza Mackenna as Juliette Blanche
- Annis Carrión as Madelyn Santana
- Elías Collado as Andrés Rojas
- Simón Beltrán as Moísés León
- Giulia Inostroza as Beatriz Bandini
- Roxana Naranjo as Violeta
- Rosmarie Gallo as Flor
- Daniel de la Vega as Fuenzalida
- Andrés Olea as Cárcamo
- Patricio Cifuentes as Detective Peralta

== Ratings ==
Season	Episodes	First aired		Last aired	
Season	Episodes	Date	Rating	Date	Rating
1	233	October 2, 2018	28.9	September 4, 2019	32.1
