= Ximena Rivas =

Chilean actress

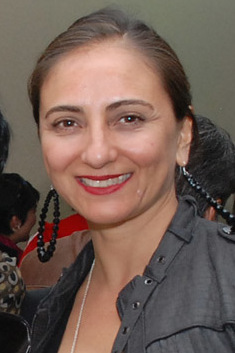
- Ximena Rivas in 2011
- Born: Ximena Luisa Rivas Hanson; August 12, 1963 (age 63); Santiago de Chile
- Education: University of Chile
- Occupation: Actress
- Years active: 1985–present

Ximena Luisa Rivas Hanson (born Santiago, August 12, 1963) is a Chilean actress of theater, film and television.

== Acting career ==
Her career began with one of the most important works of the Chilean theater La negra Ester (1988), where she played several roles, Zulema, the prostitute with long legs, Lily, Esther's sister; and Violeta Parra (his brother Roberto Parra Sandoval being the composer of Las décimas de La negra Ester) where she also performed the song La Jardinera. This work and participation was in the company Gran Circo Teatro (1988–1994) directed by the great Chilean theater teacher Andrés Pérez Araya. In 1995 she was summoned by the television director Vicente Sabatini —who went to watch her at the Teatro de la Universidad Católica in Molière's Tartufo play, where she played the funny Dorina— and integrates her into the cast of the romantic comedy Estúpido Cupido, by Televisión Nacional de Chile, where she played the employee Felicita Bonita, sharing credits with José Soza.

Rivas joined the Golden Age of National Television telenovelas, collaborating with Sabatini and María Eugenia Rencoret between 1995 and 2006. In 1997 she played Eva Félix in Tic Tac, directed by Rencoret. The role of her was received by the audience with rave reviews along with Bastián Bodenhöfer, and she received by the Association of Show Journalists, the Apes Award for the best leading actress on television. Due to her popularity, the following year, she starred in Borrón y cuenta nueva (1998) alongside Patricia Rivadeneira and Sigrid Alegría. In 1999 he got the leading role in The Sentimental Teaser, directed by Roberto Artiagoitía, one of the most watched films in the history of Chilean cinema. In the same year, she played La Poncia in Aquelarre, with great reception, in which she received the Apes Award for Best Supporting Actress and earned a Best Actress nomination at the TV Grama Award. Recently she has gained further praise for her role in Amor a la Catalán (2019).

== Filmography ==
=== Films ===
Films
Year	Film	Character	Director
1997	Historias de fútbol	Romina	Andrés Wood
1998	Aventureros del fin del mundo		Miguel Littín
1999	El duelo	Balvina	Miguel Littín
1999	La chica del crillón	Mabel Cepeda	Alberto Daiber
1999	The Sentimental Teaser	Carmen	Cristián Galaz
2002	Paraíso B	Hermana de Leo	Nicolás Acuña
2006	Kiltro	Sara	Ernesto Díaz
2009	La Gabriela	Gabriela Mistral	Rodrigo Moreno
2012	Bombal: Fuego en la niebla	Marta Brunet	Marcelo Ferrari
2013	El árbol magnético	Paty	Isabel de Ayguavives
2016	Neruda	Nana Gutiérrez Bonelli	Pablo Larraín
2018	Green Grass	Rosa	Ignacio Ruiz

=== Telenovelas ===
Telenovelas
Year	Telenovela	Character	Channel
1986	La villa	Mabel	TVN
1988	Las dos caras del amor	Marcia Vega	TVN
1995	Estúpido Cupido	Felicia Manzano	TVN
1996	Sucupira	Susana Portela	TVN
1997	Eclipse de luna	Magaly Yáñez	Canal 13
1997	Tic Tac	Eva Felix	TVN
1998	Borrón y cuenta nueva	Ignacia Izquierdo	TVN
1999	Aquelarre	María González "La Poncia"	TVN
2001	Pampa Ilusión	Julia Méndez "La Suspiro"	TVN
2002	El circo de las Montini	Elena Lorenzo Montini	TVN
2003	Puertas adentro	Rosita Bernales	TVN
2004	Los Pincheira	Fatme Hassan	TVN
2005	Los Capo	Giustina Bandoni	TVN
2006	Entre medias	Mercedes del Solar	TVN
2006	Floribella	Teresa "Titina" Ramos	TVN
2007	Papi Ricky	Trinidad Azócar	Canal 13
2009	Cuenta conmigo	Teresa Alcántara	Canal 13
2011	Témpano	Isabel Grau	TVN
2012	Reserva de familia	Jacqueline Ortega	TVN
2013	Dos por uno	Silvia Villanueva	TVN
2014	Las 2 Carolinas	Rebeca Ibarra	Chilevisión
2015	Matriarcas	Letizia Nazer	TVN
2017	Perdona nuestros pecados	Guillermina Márquez	Mega
2019	Amar a morir	Gladys Letelier	TVN
2019	Amor a la Catalán	Betsy Mardones	Canal 13
