= Tamara Acosta =

Chilean actress

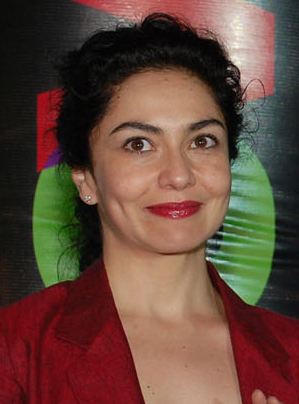
- 2011
- Born: Tamara Olga Acosta Zambra; 5 February 1972 (age 54); San Bernardo, Chile
- Other name: The muse of Chilean cinema
- Education: Instituto Sagrado Corazón
- Occupation: Actress
- Years active: 1994–present
- Spouse: Sebastián Araya
- Awards: Altazor (2000, 2009, 2010, 2011); APES (1996, 2001); Copihue de Oro (2006, 2007, 2010); TV Grama (2009, 2010); Caleuche (2016)

Tamara Olga Acosta Zambra (born 5 February 1972) is a prominent Chilean actress.

== Career ==
Tamara Acosta graduated from the Theater School of Fernando González. She is a recognized figure of theater, television, and above all is known as "the muse of Chilean cinema" because she has participated in a large number of films produced in Chile. She has won several awards at international festivals. Her first television appearance was on Sábado Gigante Internacional in 1991, as a participant in a situation contest.

For her outstanding performance as Ana López on the series Los 80 she was nominated five consecutive times for the Altazor Award for best television actress, winning it three years in a row.

== Filmography ==
Year	Title	Role	Director	Notes
1994	Largadistancia		Claudia Aravena	
1997	Volando voy		Miguel Albaladejo	
1998	Gringuito	María Ortuzar	Sergio Castilla	
1999	El desquite	Anita	Andrés Wood	Winner: Altazor; Winner: Damascus Film Festival
1999	La chica del Crillón	Teresa Iturrigorriaga	Alberto Daiber	
1999	The Sentimental Teaser	Mía Ballero	Cristián Galaz	Winner: Altazor
2000	Tierra del Fuego	Mennar	Miguel Littín	
2001	Te amo (made in Chile)	Ema Neira	Sergio Castilla	Winner: APES Award
2001	La Fiebre del Loco	Nelly	Andrés Wood	Winner: Cartagena Film Festival; Winner: Lima Festival; Nominated: Altazor
2004	Azul y blanco	Paloma Sanhueza	Sebastián Araya	
2004	Machuca	Juana María	Andrés Wood	Nominated: Altazor
2005	Monógamo sucesivo		Pablo Basulto	
2005	The Last Moon	Matty	Miguel Littín	
2006	El rey de los huevones	Sandra	Boris Quercia	
2007	Casa de remolienda	Irene "La Ronca"	Joaquín Eyzaguirre	
2007	Rojo intenso	Inspectora González	Javier Elorrieta	
2007	Radio Corazón	Valeria	Roberto Artiagoitia	
2009	La Gabriela	Palma Guillén	Rodrigo Moreno del Campo	
2011	My Last Round	Matilde	Julio Jorquera	
2011	Gente mala del norte	La musa (voice)	Patricio Riquelme	
2011	El lenguaje del tiempo		Sebastián Araya	
2015	El Inquisidor	Juana	Ignacio Eyzaguirre	
2017	La Salamandra	La mujer	Sebastián Araya	
2022	S.O.S. Mamis: La película	Milagros	Gabriela Sobarzo Mierzo	
2023	S.O.S. Mamis 2: Mosquita muerta	Milagros	Gabriela Sobarzo Mierzo	

== Television ==
=== Telenovelas ===
Year	Title	Role	Channel
1994	Champaña	Cynthia Jurandir	Canal 13
1994	Top secret	Amparo Mena	Canal 13
1995	Estúpido Cupido	Marisol Tagle	TVN
1996	Sucupira	Daniela López	TVN
1996	Loca piel	Danitza Torres / Lorena Torres	TVN
1997	Oro verde	Jeannette Machuca	TVN
1998	Iorana	Tahía Peñailillo	TVN
1999	La fiera	Kathia Alejandra Cereceda "DJ Kathia"	TVN
2001	Pampa Ilusión	Clementina Paita	TVN
2002	El circo de las Montini	Nadia Carolina Marín "La Comaneci"	TVN
2004	Los Pincheira	Matilde del Solar	TVN
2007	Papi Ricky	Colomba Chaparro	Canal 13
2008	Don Amor	Gloria Alessandri	Canal 13
2010	Feroz	Soledad Gutiérrez	Canal 13
2015	Veinteañero a los 40	Rafaela Guerra	Canal 13
2016	Preciosas	Elsa Morales	Canal 13
2017	Soltera otra vez	Tatiana Álvarez	Canal 13

=== Series and miniseries ===
Year	Title	Role	Channel	Notes
1997– 1998	Sucupira, la comedia	Daniela López	TVN	
2007	Lo que callamos las mujeres	Jessenia	Mega	Episode: "Difícil de olvidar"
2008– 2014	Los 80	Ana López	Canal 13	78 episodes Altazor Award for Best Television Actress (2009–2011); Nominated: Altazor Award for Best Television Actress (2012–2013); TV Grama for Best Actress (2009–2010); Nominated: Copihue de Oro for Best Actress (2012–2014); Nominated: TV Grama for Best Actress (2011–2012); Caleuche Award for Best Actress in Series (2016)
2012	Vida por vida	Dr. María Teresa León	Canal 13	13 episodes

==== Appearances ====
- La ruta de la seda (TVN, 2001) – Co-host
- La ruta de Amazonía (TVN, 2007) – Co-host
- Vértigo V/S (Canal 13, 2008) – Guest
- Acoso textual (Canal 13, 2010) – Guest
- Zona de estrellas (Zona Latina, 2012) – Guest
- Vértigo 2012 (Canal 13, 2012) – Guest
- Sin maquillaje (TVN, 2013) – Guest
- Dudo (13C, 2013) – Guest

== Theater ==
- Madame de Sade (1993)
- La visita (1996), directed by Claudia Di Girolamo
- Los Ciegos (1997)
- Las Huachas (2008)
- Topografía de un Desnudo (2010)
- Amledi, El Tonto (2010)
- Padre (2011)
- Persiguiendo a Nora Helmer (2012)
- Lady Marginal (2017), directed by Claudia Di Girolamo

== Awards ==
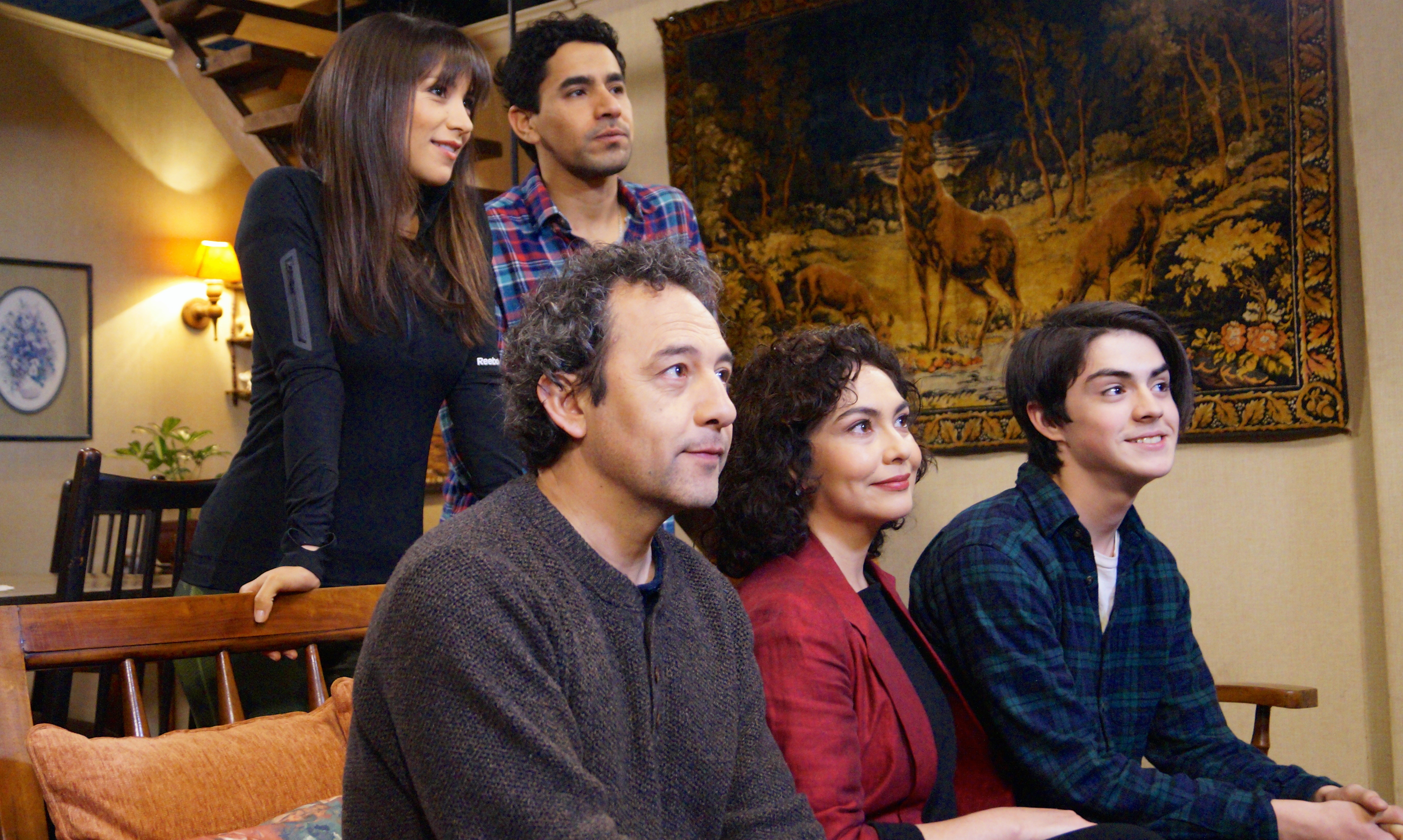
Acosta playing Ana López on the series Los 80, a role which earned her several awards

=== Altazor ===
Year	Category	Production	Result
2000	Best Actress – Film	El desquite / The Sentimental Teaser	Winner
2002	Best Actress – Film	La fiebre del loco	Nominated
2005	Best Actress – Film	Machuca	Nominated
2009	Best Actress – Theater	Las Huachas	Nominated
2009	Best Actress – Television	Los 80: first season	Winner
2010	Best Actress – Television	Los 80: second season	Winner
2011	Best Actress – Television	Los 80: third season	Winner
2012	Best Actress – Television	Los 80: fourth season	Nominated
2013	Best Actress – Television	Los 80: fifth season	Nominated

=== APES ===
Year	Category	Production	Result
1996	Best Actress – Television (cast)	Loca piel	Winner
2001	Best Actress – Film	La fiebre del loco / Te amo (made in Chile)	Winner

=== Copihue de Oro ===
Year	Category	Result
2006	Best Actress – Film	Winner
2007	Best Actress – Film	Winner
2010	Best Actress – Film	Winner
2012	Best Actress – Television	Nominated
2013	Best Actress – Television	Nominated
2014	Best Actress – Television	Nominated

=== TV Grama ===
Year	Category	Production	Result
2009	Best Actress – Television	Los 80: second season	Winner
2010	Best Actress – Television	Los 80: third season	Winner
2011	Best Actress – Television	Los 80: fourth season	Nominated

=== Caleuche ===
Year	Category	Production	Result
2016	Best Leading Actress in Series	Los 80: fifth season	Winner

=== Other awards ===
Year	Country	Award	Category	Production
1999	(Syria)	Damascus Film Festival	Best Actress	El desquite
2002	(Colombia)	Cartagena Film Festival	Best Actress of Cast	La fiebre del loco
2002	(Peru)	Lima Festival	Best Actress	La fiebre del loco
