= Sebastián Araya =

Chilean filmmaker (b. 1971)

- Born: 1971 (age 54–55); Lisbon
- Spouse: Tamara Acosta
- Children: 1
- Relatives: Miguel Serrano (grandfather)

Sebastián Miguel Araya Serrano (born 1971) is a Chilean filmmaker.

== Biography ==
Born in Lisbon in 1971, Araya is a grandson of diplomat Miguel Serrano and a cousin of writer Rafael Gumucio. He is the husband of actress Tamara Acosta, with whom he has a daughter, Olga, born in 2013.

== Filmography ==
Year	Title	Role	Note
1996	Nazca	Inti	13 episodes
1995	Bienvenida Casandra	Himself	Film
1998	Vivir al día	—N/a	Writer; 3 episodes
2003	Mujer rompe el silencio	—N/a	Director; TV series
2004	Azul y blanco	—N/a	Director, writer
2009	Mi Primera Vez	—N/a	Director; 1 episode
2011	El lenguaje del tiempo	—N/a	Director, writer
2012	Vida por vida	—N/a	Director; 10 episodes
2010–2014	Infieles	—N/a	Director; 11 episodes
2014	Invisibles	—N/a	Director, writer; TV series
2015	Príncipes de Barrio	—N/a	Director; 9 episodes
2015	Mito Sudamericano	—N/a	Director, writer; mini-series
2018	La Salamandra	—N/a	Director
2018	Santiago Paranormal	—N/a	Director; mini-series
2020	El Sueño de Chile	—N/a	Director; TV series
2018–2022	Grandes Pillos: artistas del engaño	—N/a	Director; 5 episodes
2023	Enigma	—N/a	Director; 1 episode
