= María José Prieto =

Chilean actress (born 1977)

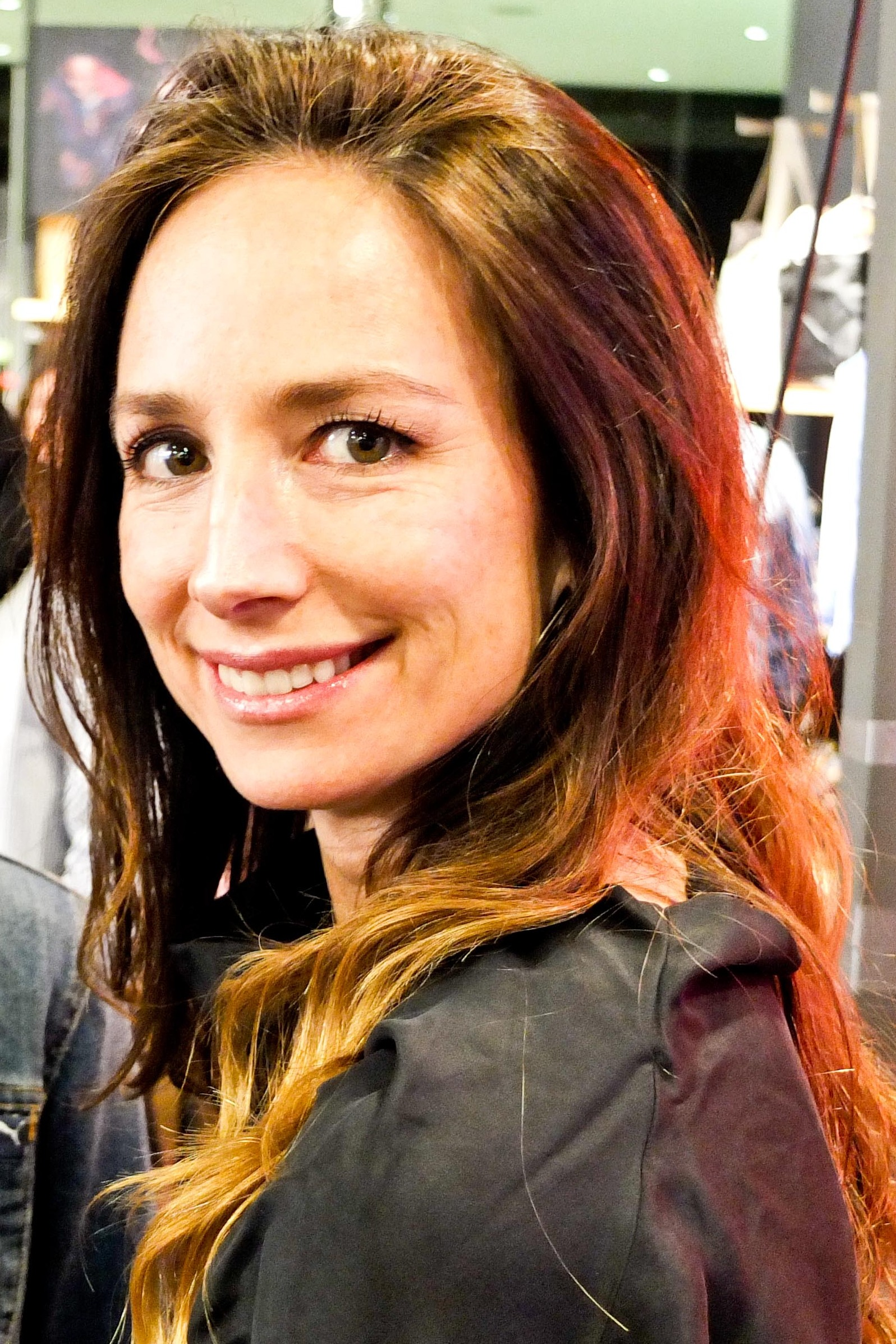
- Prieto in 2012
- Born: María José Prieto Larraín; February 20, 1977 (age 49); Santiago, Chile
- Occupation: Actress
- Years active: 1998–present
- Spouse: Cristián Campos (m. 2009)

María José Prieto Larraín (February 20, 1977) is a Chilean film and television actress.

María José Prieto entered the Villa María Academy school in Santiago in 1981, where she completed her primary studies and part of secondary school until 1985, after which she went to live with her family in Buenos Aires, Argentina, where she finished high school in 1994.

Back in Chile, in 1995, she entered the Pontificia Universidad Católica de Chile to study Baccalaureate in Social Sciences and Humanities, graduating in 1997. She later studied Theater at the Pontifical Catholic University (1996-1998)

María José Prieto made her television debut at age 21, in the telenovela A todo dar, produced and broadcast by Megavisión, a participation that led her to win the APES award for Best Acting Screening.

After participating in some telefilms from the same station, she traveled to Madrid, Spain, to take a circus-theater course at the LeCoq academy directed by Ana Vasquez De Castro and then return to Chile to join Channel 13 in 2001, where she acts in the Telenovela Corazón Pirata, which obtained a poor tuning.

After this stage, the actress travels to New York where she studies at the Lee Strasberg Academy, and then returns to Chile to dedicate herself mainly to theater, where she acted in works such as "Now there are the children" and "Crime and shampoo" .

In 2003, she returned to Channel 13, where she appeared in the successful television series Machos, to continue acting in that station in television series such as Tentación and Gatas y Tuercas, which were extremely successful.

In 2004 she ventured into the cinema in the box office film Mujeres Infieles.

In 2005, she signed a contract with the Chilevisión television channel to host the Manzana program and star in the first television series of that channel, the successful Vivir con 10, to later play another leading role in the second television series of the same channel, Bad Conduct.

She is also a Yogini teacher.

She is married to fellow actor Cristián Campos since 2009, and her sister is Ángela Prieto, also an actress.

== Filmography ==
=== Films ===
- 2002: "Domesticame" Director Rodrigo Terreros.
- 2004: "Mujeres Infieles" Director Rodrigo Ortuzar Lynch.
- 2005: "Vernissage" Directora Yael Rosemblut.
- 2008: "Pecados" Director Martín Rodríguez.
- 2012: "Bombal" Director Marcelo Ferrari.
- 2018: "Contra el demonio" Director José Miguel Zúñiga

=== Telenovelas ===
Telenovelas
Year	Title	Character
1998	A todo dar	Maite del Río
1999	Algo está cambiando	Javiera Risopatrón
2000-2001	La otra cara del espejo	Varios personajes
2001	Corazón pirata	Natalia Condell
2002	Más que amigos	Claudia
2003	Machos	Mónica Salazar
2004-2005	Tentación	Tania Donoso
2005-2006	Gatas y Tuercas	Violeta López
2005	Los simuladores	Ximena (1 episode)
2007	Vivir con 10	Olimpia Solé
2008	Mala conducta	Flavia Inostroza
2012	Separados	Claudia Amstrong (15 episodes)
2014	Mamá mechona	Valeria García (2 episodes)
2016	El Camionero	Denise Cienfuegos
2016	Casa de Angelis	Elsa Echeñique
2018	Perdona nuestros pecados	Lucrecia Romero
2018-2019	Isla Paraíso	Elena Martínez
