= S.O.S. Mamis 2: New Mom on the Block =

- Amazon Prime Video release poster
- Directed by: Gabriela Sobarzo
- Written by: Mirella Granucci; Aníbal Herrera
- Produced by: Miguel Asensio
- Starring: Loreto Aravena; Paz Bascuñán; Tamara Acosta; María Elena Swett; Jenny Cavallo; Karla Melo
- Music by: Manuel Ribeiro
- Production company: Tiki Pictures
- Distributed by: Amazon Prime Video
- Release date: August 2, 2023
- Running time: 100 minutes
- Country: Chile
- Language: Spanish

S.O.S. Mamis 2: New Mom on the Block (Spanish: S.O.S. Mamis 2: Mosquita muerta, lit. 'S.O.S. Mommies 2: Dead Mosquito') is a 2023 Chilean comedy film directed by Gabriela Sobarzo and written by Mirella Granucci and Aníbal Herrera. It is based on the web series S.O.S. Mamis, which in turn is a sequel to S.O.S. Mamis: La película (2022). Once again, it stars Loreto Aravena, Paz Bascuñán, Tamara Acosta, María Elena Swett and Jenny Cavallo, incorporating Karla Melo into the main cast. It premiered on August 2, 2023, on Amazon Prime Video.

== Synopsis ==
Daniela is an attractive young mother whose son receives a scholarship to attend the prestigious Saint Michael School. The group made up of Luna, Milagros and Julia are delighted with the new addition to the school community. However, Trini begins to suspect that something is not right and embarks on an investigation to discover the truth. The rest of the group believes that Trini is jealous of Daniela's popularity, but they soon discover that there is something much darker behind the new mom's innocent appearance.

== Cast ==
The actors participating in this film are:

- Paz Bascuñán as Trini
- Tamara Acosta as Milagros
- María Elena Swett as Julia
- Loreto Aravena as Luna
- Jenny Cavallo as Clarita
- Karla Melo as Daniela
- Ignacia Allamand as María Gracia
- Ricardo Fernández Flores as Chancho
- Igal Furman as Father Anthony
- Cristina Aburto as Director
- Leonor Asencio Bascuñán as Sofía
- Francisco German as Alberto
- Edison Díaz as Sublieutenant
- Paulina Hunt as Nun of the College of Rancagua
- Ignacio Santa Cruz as Representative Rancagua School
- Elías Collado as Alex
- Luis Pablo Román as Papa Mari Manzanares
- Santiago Bowe Swett as Dante
- Cristopher Acevedo González as Juan De Dios
- Matteo Sepúlveda Silva as Inti
- Florencia Massando Cavallo as Blanquita
- Lía Maldonado as Daniela's Aunt
- Víctor López as Drunk Man
- Fernando Alé as Seductive Man
- Jaime Bandayrel as James
- Luis Pablo Román as Pepe Mari Manzanares
- Laura Álvarez González as Heir to Pepe Mari Manzanares
- Teresita Alcántara as Mexican Teleseries Woman
- Eduardo Pacheco as Mexican Teleseries Man
