= Loreto Aravena =

Chilean actress (born 1983)

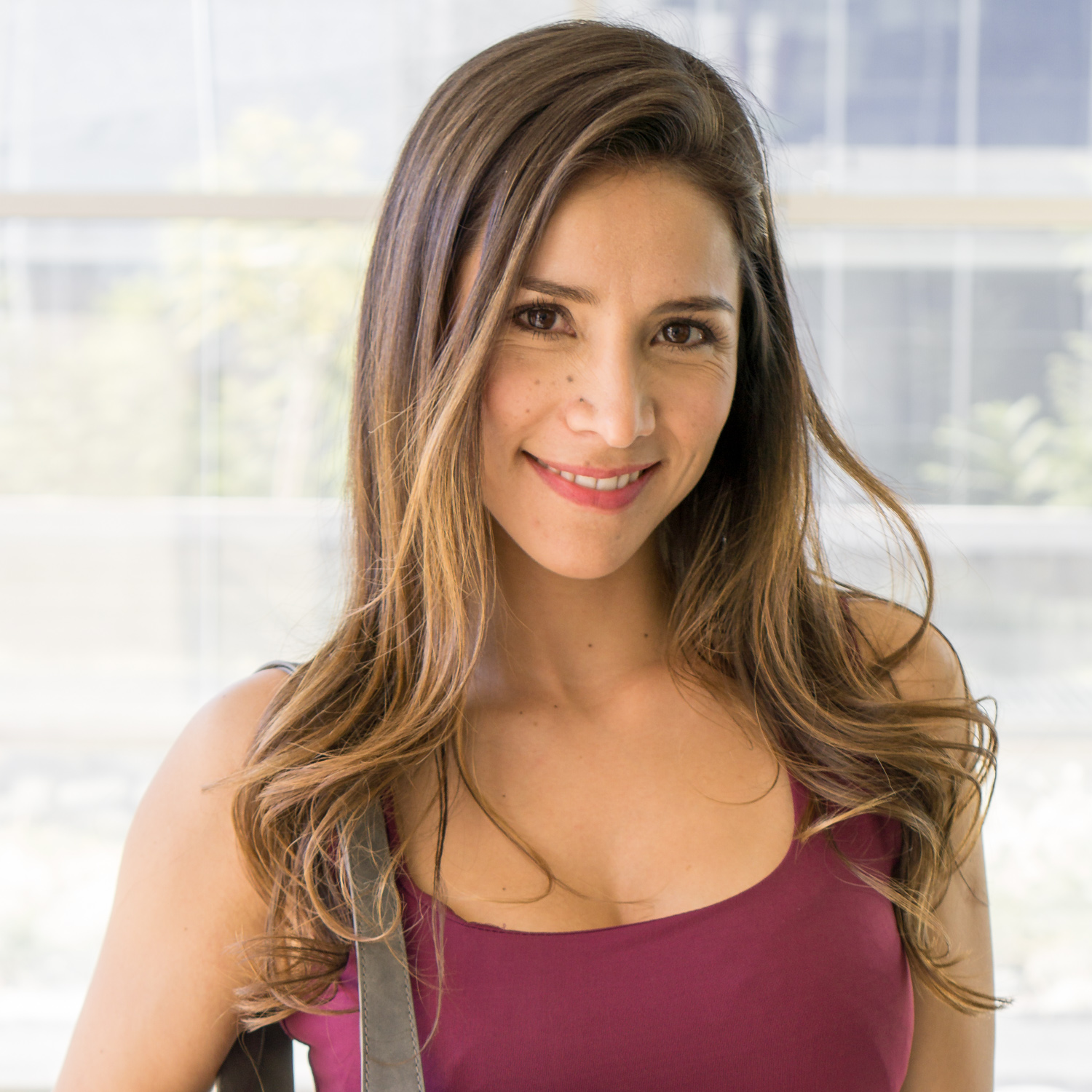
- Loreto Aravena (2016)
- Born: Loreto del Pilar Aravena Soto; June 8, 1983 (age 43); Santiago, Chile
- Occupation: Actor
- Years active: 2005–present
- Spouses: Juan Pablo Ternicier (m. 2012; div. 2017) Maximiliano Luksič (m. 2017; div. 2019)
- Children: Ema Ternicier Aravena (b. 2015)

Loreto del Pilar Aravena Soto (born August 6, 1983) is a Chilean actress who is known for her role as Claudia Herrera, in the series Los 80 on Channel 13.

== Biography ==
She is the youngest of three siblings. She did her school studies at the Joaquina de Verdruna school in Puente Alto and later studied at the University of Chile.

She achieved recognition with her role as Claudia Herrera in the bicentennial series Los 80, aired in 2008, where she entered after a casting, in which the directors decided to immediately cast her as the character of Claudia Herrera.

In 2010, she reached third place in the circus competition program Circo de estrellas on TVN. She also joined Rock And Pop radio as an announcer on the radio program Cabeza along with Matilda Svensson. In 2011, it was expected that she would join TVN in the production of the telenovela Esperanza, however, she decided to stay on Channel 13 to be part of the successful 2012 nighttime soap opera Soltera otra vez, where she played the role of Susana "Susy" Sánchez. She also hosted the program El Rito on Radio Universo.

In 2013 and 2016, she continued her participation in various soap operas on Channel 13 such as El hombre de tu vida, Chipe libre and Preciosas, at the same time she participated in the first and second installments of the film Fuerzas Especiales. [12] In 2017, she joined the film Sapo.

In 2018, she was part of the cast of Pacto de sangre, a series that within six months of airing, received numerous awards and nominations. The following year, she joined the television series Amor a la Catalán. Aravena was released from Channel 13 in December 2019.

== Filmography ==
Films
Year	Film	Character	Director
2009	Tiempos malos		Cristián Sánchez
2011	03:34	Ana	Juan Pablo Ternicier
2013	No soy Lorena	Olivia	Isidora Marras
2014	Fuerzas Especiales	Cabo Vergara	José Miguel Zúñiga
2015	Fuerzas Especiales 2	Cabo Vergara	José Miguel Zúñiga
2017	Sapo		Juan Pablo Ternicier
2022	S.O.S. Mamis: La película	Luna	Gabriela Sobarzo
2023	S.O.S. Mamis 2: Mosquita muerta	Luna	Gabriela Sobarzo
2023	Rayen	Miranda	Alexander Witt

TV Series and Telenovelas
Year	Title	Character	Director
2005	Historias de Eva	Daniela	
2008–2014	Los 80	Claudia Herrera López	Boris Quercia
2010	Cartas de mujer	Jacinta	
2012–2017	Soltera otra vez	Sussy Sánchez	Herval Abreu
2013	El hombre de tu vida	Olivia	Boris Quercia
2014	Chipe libre	Catalina Pardo	Herval Abreu
2016	Preciosas	Lorena Martínez "La Martillo"	Herval Abreu
2018–2019	Pacto de sangre	Josefa Urrutia	Cristián Mason
2019–2020	Amor a la Catalán	Danae Catalán	Vicente Sabatini
2020	S.O.S Mamis		

Television programs
Year	Title	Program	Detail
2010	Circo de estrellas	TVN	Participante
2013	Todo Cine	13C	Conductora
2013	Séptimo Vicio	Via X	Invitada

=== Musical videos ===
Año	Título	Artista	Dirección
2017	La Funa	Joe Vasconcellos & Moral Distraída	Tomas Alzamora
2011	No me Ves	Narea y Tapia	Álvaro Pruneda
