= La Ofis (Chilean TV series) =

Chilean comedy television series

- Genre: Comedy
- Created by: Benjamín Veroiza
- Inspired by: The Office (British TV series) and The Office (American TV series)
- Country of origin: Chile
- No. of seasons: 1
- No. of episodes: 12

Production
- Executive producers: Julián Elfenbein; Alexander Kiblisky; Julian Mancini; Moises Sánchez
- Producer: Andrés Duque

Original release
- Network: Canal 13
- Release: August 6 – November 22, 2008

La Ofis is a Chilean mockumentary television series. The series is one of the official adaptations of the British TV series The Office, and the first one whose original language was Spanish. The series was produced by Canal 13 with Chilecorto and was released in 2008 in the Canal 13 network, running for one season with 12 episodes. La Ofis modified the original British/American humor to be closer to the local Chilean humor, which helped it connect more to the local Chilean audience.

== Synopsis ==
La Ofis uses a mockumentary format to explore the everyday work life of the workers at the fictional "Papeles Lozano" paper company in Santiago, Chile. The series mainly focuses on branch manager Manuel Cerda, played by Luis Gnecco, who is described as "pathetic", "incompetent" and "lacking social skills". Cerda's awkward attempts at humor, which include dark humor such as sexist remarks and xenophobia against his Peruvian coworker, often lead to embarrassment and discomfort among his staff, similar to that of his American counterpart Michael Scott.

== Production ==
La Ofis was produced by Canal 13 with the help of Chilecorto. The founders of Propalta films, Nimrod Amitai and Nacho Arnold, were in charge of both the general direction and general production of the series. The series is based on the British and American versions of The Office.

According to production accounts, the idea of a Chilean adaptation of The Office began when a screenwriter named Carlos Bleycher gave Amitai a CD with the British version of The Office on it, which prompted Amitai to suggest to Julián Elfenbein (his boss) the idea of making an official adaptation of The Office in Chile, resulting in them buying the rights to produce an adaptation. After having produced a pilot, they pitched the idea to Chilevisión, but they were rejected. After the rejection, they pursued Canal 13, which accepted the idea and started the show's production.

The series aired on August 6, 2008. It ran in intervals of seven to eight days across late 2008, ending on November 22 of that year.

== Episodes ==
No.	Title	Original release date
1	"Manuel Cerda"	6 August 2008
2	"El Primer Despido"	13 August 2008
3	"Bienestar Laboral"	20 August 2008
4	"El Cumpleaños De Manuel Cerda"	28 August 2008
5	"Recorte De Personal"	3 September 2008
6	"El Plan Estratégico De Manuel"	10 September 2008
7	"Papeles Lozano Está De Luto"	17 September 2008
8	"La Huelga"	24 September 2008
9	"Clima Organizacional"	1 October 2008
10	"Día De Campo"	8 October 2008
11	"Grandes Cambios En Lozano"	15 October 2008
12	"El Héroe"	12 October 2008

== Cast ==
Actor	Role
Luis Gnecco	Manuel Cedra
Mauricio Dell	Cristian Müller
Pablo Casals	Diego Ramírez
Nathalia Aragonese	Rocío Poblete
Liliana García	Jimena Ibarra
Alfredo Portuondo	César
Jimena Núñez	Yanni
Luz María Yacometti	Teresita
Karla Matta	Trini
César Sepúlveda	Felipe Tomic
Marcelo Valdivieso	Jesús
Cristian Quezada	Dante
Juan Quezada	Don Hugo
Marcelo Maldonado	Marco
María José Urzúa	Catalina
Vittorio Yaconi	Benito
Sergio Piña	Carlos García
Mónica Yáñez	María
