= Neruda (film) =

2016 film

- Film poster
- Directed by: Pablo Larraín
- Written by: Guillermo Calderón
- Produced by: Renan Artukmac; Peter Danner; Fernando Del Nido; Juan Pablo García; Axel Kuschevatzky; Juan de Dios Larraín; Ignacio Rey; Gaston Rothschild; Jeff Skoll; Alex Zito
- Starring: Gael García Bernal; Luis Gnecco; Mercedes Morán
- Cinematography: Sergio Armstrong
- Edited by: Hervè Schneid
- Music by: Federico Jusid
- Production companies: AZ Films; Casting del Sur; Fábula; Funny Balloons; Participant Media; Reborn Production; Stembro Cine; Televisión Federal
- Distributed by: 20th Century Fox (Chile); Buena Vista International (Argentina); Wild Bunch (France); Wanda Films (Spain); The Orchard (United States)
- Release dates: 13 May 2016 (Cannes); 11 August 2016 (Chile); 23 September 2016 (Spain); 16 December 2016 (United States); 4 January 2017 (France)
- Running time: 107 minutes
- Countries: Chile; Argentina; France; Spain; United States
- Language: Spanish
- Box office: $1.9 million

Neruda is a 2016 biographical drama film directed by Pablo Larraín. Mixing history and fiction, the film shows the dramatic events of the suppression of Communists in Chile in 1948 and how the poet, diplomat, politician and Nobel Prize winner Pablo Neruda had to go on the run, eventually escaping on horseback over the Andes.

== Plot ==
In 1946, Chile's president Gabriel González Videla wins the election with Communist support but later betrays them, banning the party and ordering mass arrests. Senator Pablo Neruda, a former ambassador and renowned poet, condemns the repression, endangering himself. He and his wife Delia attempt to flee to Argentina through the mountains but are turned back at the border and forced into hiding.

Oscar Peluchonneau, a young policeman, is assigned to capture Neruda. To understand his target, Peluchonneau studies Neruda's life and poetry. Meanwhile, Neruda makes surprise appearances, leaving poetry volumes to mobilize resistance, creating a cat-and-mouse game where Peluchonneau is always one step behind. As the hunt intensifies, Neruda's friends arrange for smugglers to take him over the border on horseback.

While Delia is captured and interrogated by Peluchonneau. She asserts that in their story, the policeman is secondary, a remark that unsettles Peluchonneau and undermines his confidence, suggesting Neruda's legacy will endure while Peluchonneau will fade into fiction.

As Neruda's group traverses snowy forests toward the border, Peluchonneau pursues but cannot catch them. He dies on a snowy mountaintop, abandoned by his indigenous guides. Neruda later finds his body. Peluchonneau's grip on reality ends as he becomes part of the fiction he once pursued. Neruda escapes to Paris, where he is welcomed by Pablo Picasso and becomes a media sensation. At a press conference, Neruda mentions Peluchonneau, allowing him a lasting memory.

== Cast ==
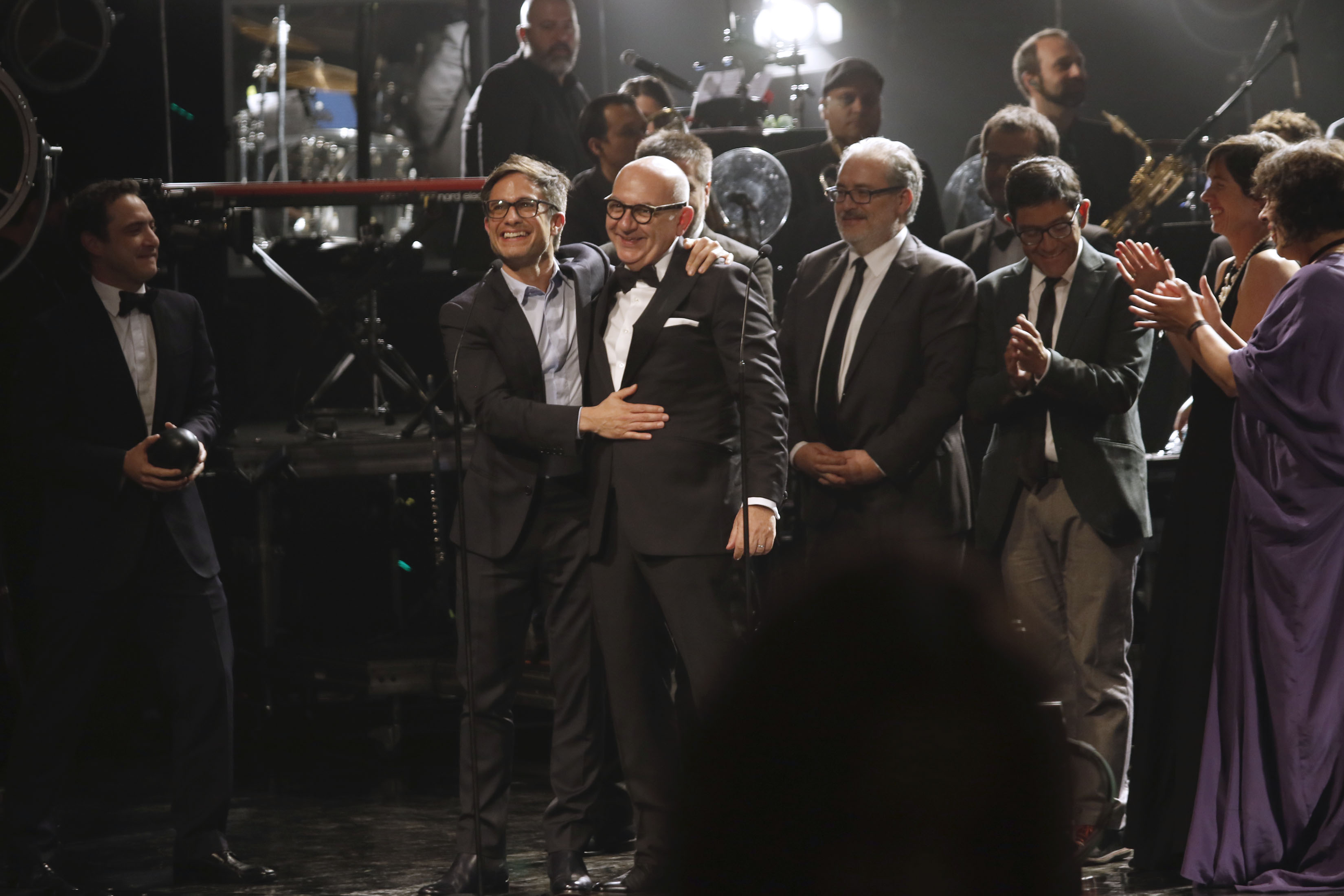
Cast of Neruda receiving Premio Fénix 2016 for Best Picture

- Luis Gnecco as Pablo Neruda
- Gael García Bernal as Óscar Peluchonneau
- Alfredo Castro as Gabriel González Videla
- Mercedes Morán as Delia del Carril
- Diego Muñoz as Martínez
- Pablo Derqui as Víctor Pey
- Michael Silva as Álvaro Jara
- Jaime Vadell as Arturo Alessandri
- Marcelo Alonso as Pepe Rodríguez
- Francisco Reyes as Bianchi
- Alejandro Goic as Jorge Bellett
- Emilio Gutiérrez Caba as Pablo Picasso
- Antonia Zegers
- Héctor Noguera
- Amparo Noguera
- Ximena Rivas
- Pablo Schwarz
- Néstor Cantillana
- Marcial Tagle
- Cristián Campos
- José Soza

== Release ==
It was screened in the Directors' Fortnight section at the 2016 Cannes Film Festival. It was selected as the Chilean entry for the Best Foreign Language Film at the 89th Academy Awards but it was not nominated.

After the world premiere at Cannes on 13 May 2016, The Orchard and Wild Bunch acquired U.S. and French distribution rights, respectively. It was shown at the Telluride Film Festival on 4 September 2016 and the Toronto International Film Festival on 8 September 2016. It screened at the New York Film Festival on 5 October 2016.

The film was released in Chile on 11 August 2016 by 20th Century Fox, in the United States on 16 December 2016, and in France on 4 January 2017.

== Reception ==
=== Critical response ===
On the review aggregator website Rotten Tomatoes, 93% of 155 critics' reviews are positive, with an average rating of 7.7/10. The website's consensus reads: "Inventive, intelligent, and beautifully filmed, Neruda transcends the traditional biopic structure to look at the meaning beyond the details of its subject's life." Metacritic, which uses a weighted average, assigned the film a score of 82 out of 100, based on 28 critics, indicating "universal acclaim".

=== Accolades ===
List of accolades
Award / Film Festival	Date of Ceremony	Category	Recipient(s)	Result
Golden Globe Awards	8 January 2017	Best Foreign Language Film		Nominated
Houston Film Critics Society	6 January 2017	Best Foreign Language Film		Nominated

== See also ==
- Il Postino, award-winning 1994 film about Neruda
- List of submissions to the 89th Academy Awards for Best Foreign Language Film
- List of Chilean submissions for the Academy Award for Best Foreign Language Film
