= Luis Gnecco =

Chilean film and television actor

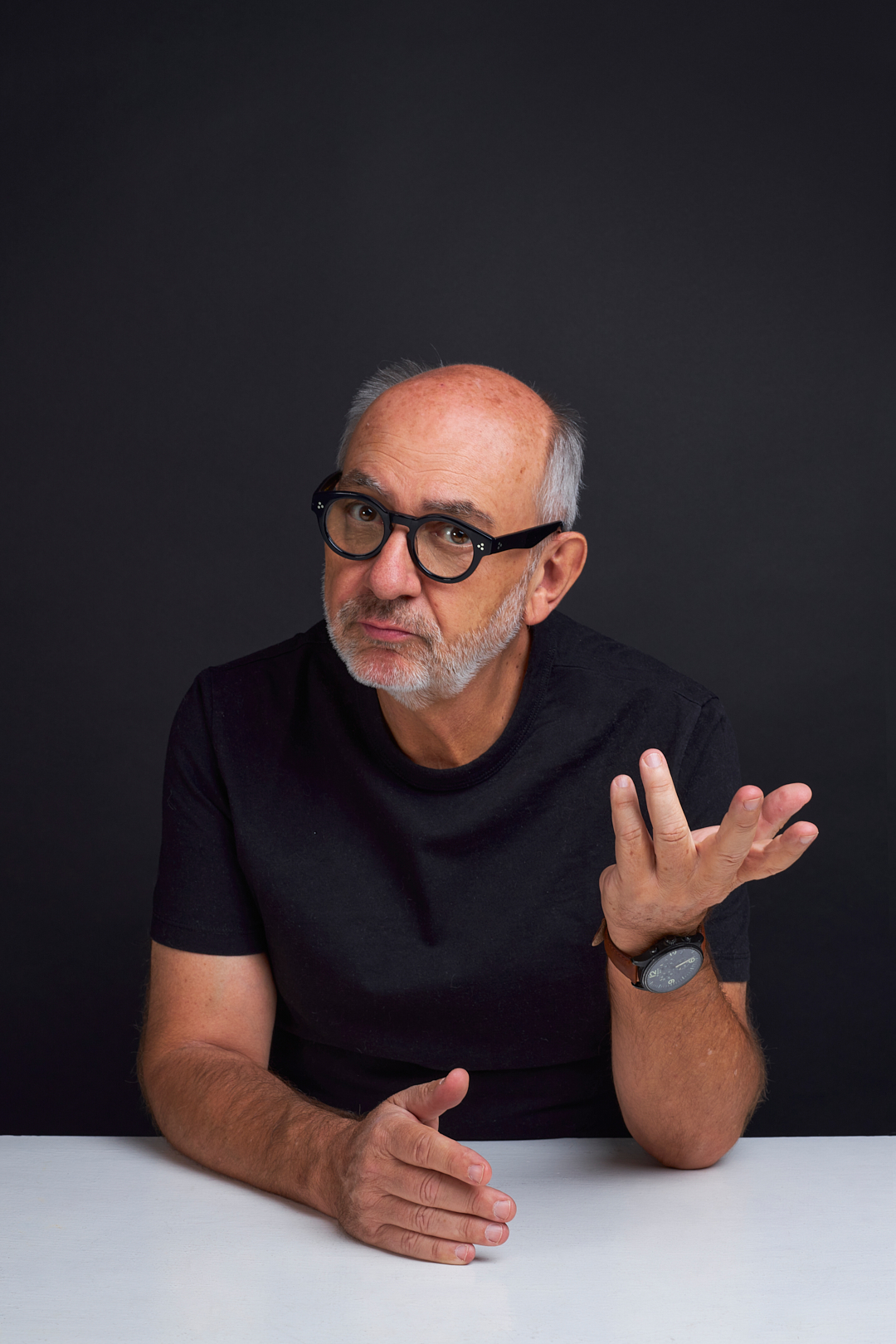
- Gnecco in 2016
- Born: 12 December 1962 (age 63); Santiago, Chile
- Occupation: Actor
- Years active: 1978–present

Luis Enrique Gnecco Dessy (Note: In this Spanish name, the first or paternal surname is Gnecco and the second or maternal family name is Dessy.) (born 12 December 1962) is a Chilean actor.

Besides his work in Chilean telenovelas and films (Johnny 100 Pesos, the Academy Award nominated No, El bosque de Karadima, A Fantastic Woman and Neruda), he is internationally known for his performances in HBO's Prófugos and Netflix series Narcos.

== Biography ==
While studying biology under, among others, Humberto Maturana, Gnecco developed into an actor and a comedian. Afterwards he studied in the Theatre academy of Fernando González.

In 1985 he began to work in telenovelas, such as Amores de mercado, Brujas, and Soltera otra vez. Two years later he started appearing in comedy shows such as De chincol a jote, El desjueves (1990–1995), and Na' que ver con Chile. In 2008 he played the lead role in the Chilean version of The Office, La Ofis. In 2016, the jury at the 17th Havana Film Festival New York awarded him the Havana Star Prize for "Best Actor" for his role in El bosque de Karadima.

== Filmography ==
=== Film ===
Year	Movie	Role
1990	Hay algo allá afuera	Aldo
1993	Johnny 100 Pesos	Alfonso
2003	Sexo con Amor	Tomás
2003	Buscando a la señorita Hyde	Inspector Gormaz
2005	Paréntesis	Gustavo "Gus"
2006	Padre Nuestro	Pedro
2007	Casa de remolienda	Mauricio Valdebenito
2007	The Black Pimpernel	Oliva - Chief of Protocol of La Moneda
2008	Chile puede	Minister of Home Affairs
2009	El visitante nocturno	
2009	El baile de la Victoria	Monasterio
2012	Young and Wild	Interviewee
2012	No	José Tomás Urrutia
2012	Pérez	Pérez
2012	Paseo de oficina	Leo
2013	El derechazo	Rubén Morales
2014	The Stranger	Lieutenant De Luca
2014	Aurora	
2015	El Bosque de Karadima	Fernando Karadima
2016	Neruda	Pablo Neruda
2016	Much Ado About Nothing	Gustavo Barría
2017	A Fantastic Woman	Gabriel Onetto Partier
2017	Artax: Un nuevo comienzo	Vasco Zartundúa
2018	El Angel	Héctor Robledo Puch
2019	My tender Matador	
2019	The Two Popes	Cardinal Claudio Hummes
2020	Nobody Knows I'm Here	
2022	Bardo, False Chronicle of a Handful of Truths	Government Secretary
2023	Confesiones	Ramiro
2024	Salvajes	Arturo
2025	La fuente	Luca Barella
2026	Borges and Me	Jorges Luis Borges

=== Television ===
Year	Title	Role	Channel
1987	La invitación	Horacio Pinto	Canal 13
1989	La intrusa	Aldo	Canal 13
1991	Villa Nápoli	Benito	Canal 13
1992	Trampas y caretas	Amadeo	TVN
1993	Jaque mate	Onofre Fajardo	TVN
1994	Rompecorazón	Mauricio Gándara	TVN
1996	Adrenalina	Álvaro del Canto	Canal 13
2000	Santoladrón	Otilio Benítez	TVN
2001	Amores de mercado	Bernardo Torres	TVN
2002	Purasangre	Julio Marambio	TVN
2002	La vida es una lotería		TVN
2003	Pecadores	Reinaldo Gatica	TVN
2003	Cuentos de mujeres	Marco	TVN
2004	Destinos cruzados	Máximo Fonseca	TVN
2004	Loco por ti	Taxista	TVN
2005	17	Marcos Talavera	TVN
2005	Tiempo final: en tiempo real	Tito	TVN
2005	Los Galindo	César Aros	TVN
2005	Heredia & asociados	González	TVN
2005	Brujas	Leopoldo Quevedo	Canal 13
2005	Los Simuladores	Federico	Canal 13
2006	Descarado	Moisés Castillo	Canal 13
2007	Papi Ricky	Leonardo Garay	Canal 13
2007	Lola	Ernesto Anguita	Canal 13
2007	Héroes	Eugenio Necochea	Canal 13
2008	La Ofis	Manuel Cerda	Canal 13
2009	Cuenta conmigo	Baltazar Polidori	Canal 13
2009	Corazón rebelde	Rubén Iturra	Canal 13
2010	La Colonia	José Miguel Gorgona y Palo Quemado	Mega
2011	Historias de la primera vez	Papá de Rodrigo	América TV
2011–2013	Prófugos	Mario Moreno	HBO
2012–2018	Soltera otra vez	Sergio "Pelao" Monroy	Canal 13
2014	Chipe libre	Ricardo Felman	Canal 13
2015	Narcos	La Cucaracha	Netflix
2015	El Bosque de Karadima: la serie	Fernando Karadima	Chilevisión
2016	Entero Quebrado		Chilevisión
2016	Veinteañero a los 40	Cristian Grez	Canal 13
