= Claudia di Girolamo =

Chilean actress and theater director

Claudia Di Girolamo
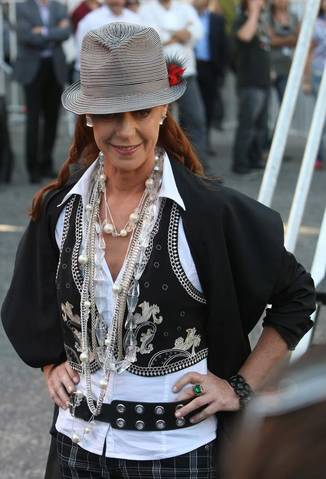
- Claudia di Girolamo
- Born: Claudia di Girolamo Quesney; November 30, 1956 (age 69); Santiago de Chile
- Education: University of Chile
- Occupation: Actress
- Years active: 1979–present
- Spouse(s): Cristián Campos (1984-1994); Vicente Sabatini (1996–present)
- Children: 3

Claudia del Carmen Di Girolamo Quesney (born December 30, 1956), is a Chilean actress and theater director of Italian descent, who has a prominent and distinguished artistic career in theater, film and television. Considered one of the best actresses of the performing arts in the history of Chilean television.

Claudia began the most successful period of her career in the 1990s, leading the first super-productions in the history of Chilean television, in the midst of Golden Age of television series, between the 1990s and 2000s, with titles such as Trampas y Caretas (1992), Estupido Cupido (1995), Oro Verde (1997), Iorana (1998), La Fiera (1999), Romané (2000), Pampa Ilusión (2001), El circo de las Montini (2002), Puertas Adentro (2003), and Los Pincheira (2004).

She was married to fellow actor Cristián Campos. Her current spouse is telenovela director, and a TVN executive, Vicente Sabatini. They were married in 1996.

== Filmography ==
=== Televisión ===
Year	Title	Role	Notas
1979	Martin Rivas	Matilde Elias	Television debut
1981	The Stepmother	Luna San Lucas	Supporting role
1982	Alguien Por Quien Vivir	Karin Sonnenberg	Co-protagonist
1982	Una Familia Feliz	Javiera Altamira	Co-protagonist
1983	La Noche del Cobarde	Maria Constanza "Mary C"	Co-protagonist
1984	The Puppets	Artemisa Mykonos	Main role
1985	Matrimonio de Papel	Carmen Perez	Supporting role
1986	Angel Malo	Lya Lozano	Co-protagonist
1986	Secretos de Familia	Xenia Cadic	Main role
1987	La Invitación	Consuelo Vilar	Main role
1990	Te Conte?	Sabrina Mardones	Main role
1991	Volver A Empezar	Valentina Urmeneta	Main role
1992	Trampas y Caretas	Mariana Rios	Main role
1993	Jaque Mate	Isabella Quesney	Main role
1994	Rompecorazon	Patricia Sierra	Main role
1995	Stupid Cupid	Sister Angelica	Main role
1997	Oro Verde	Natalia Sotomayor	Main role
1997	Sucupira, The Comedy	Sara Lineros	Season 1, Episode 8: "Escritora prohibida"
1997	Brigada Escorpión	Jacqueline Gomez	Season 1, Episode 11: "Razones para matar"
1998	Iorana	Josefa Soublette	Main role
1999	La Fiera	Catalina Chamorro "La Fiera"	Main role
2000	Romané	Jovanka Antich	Main role
2001	Pampa Ilusión	Ines Clark/Doctor Florencio Aguirre	Main role
2002	El Circo de las Montini	Olga Segunda Montini	Main role
2003	Puertas Adentro	Erica Sandoval	Main role
2004	Los Pincheira	Marwa Abu Kassem	Supporting role
2004	Idol's	Isabel Segovia	Main role
2006	Complices	Soledad Mendez	Main role
2007	Women's Prison	Camila Prado	Main role; 8 episodes
2008	Merry Widow	Beatriz Sarmiento	Main role
2008	Paz	Mrs. Almendros	Main role; 4 episodes
2009	The Successful Pell's	Franca Andrade	Main role
2009-2010	Conde Vrolok	Elena Medrano	Supporting role
2011	Fugitives	Kika Ferragut	Main role
2011-2012	The Lady	Catalina de los Rios-Lisperguer	Main role
2012-2013	The Sexologist	Olivia Pamplona	Main role
2013	Graduates	Titi	3 episodes
2013	Fugitives	Kika Ferragut	1 episode
2014	Two Carolina's	Sofia Parker	Main role
2015	Matriarch's	Diana Nazer	Main role
2016	House of Angelis	Carlota Saldías/Madama Carla	Supporting role; 5 episodes
2017-2018	Tell Me Who It Was	Adriana Lyon	Main role
2018-2019	Franklin's Queen	Julia Tocornal	Main role
2019	Dark River	Concepcion Aldunate	Main role
2020	The Pack	Francisca Izquierdo	Supporting role; 5 episodes
2022	42 Days of Darkness	Cecilia Montes	Main role
2022	The Pack 2	Francisca Izquierdo	Main role; 6 episodes
2022	Chromosome 21	Sofia Lombardi	Main role; 8 episodes
2023	Dime con quién andas	Mireya Soto Abumohor	Main role
2024	Take Me To Heaven		Supporting role

Film
Year	Title	Role	Other notes
1977	Mutis		Main role
1990	Amelia Lópes O'Neill	The Woman of Fernando	Supporting role
1990	Two Women in The City	Valeria Vergara	Main role
1996	My Last Man	Florencia	Main role
2007	Heart Radio	Sandra	Main role
2008	Secrets	Amelia	Main role
2010	Post Mortm	Marta	Especial role
2023	Behind The Rain	Dora	Main role

== Theater ==
- 1976 - The House of Bernarda Alba
- 1976 - Seximental Education
- 1978 - Loyola, Loyola
- 1979 - Zero on Left
- 1981 - Glass Roof
- 1982 - Salome
- 1984 - Last Edition
- 1987 - A Very Special Day
- 1990 - Fool for Love
- 1992 - King Lear
- 1993 - El Vacio Absurdo
- 1994 - Le Malentendu
- 1995 - La Catedral de la Luz
- 1998 - Madame de Sade
- 1999 - Fedra
- 2000 - The Heredity
- 2001 - Medea
- 2003 - The Son
- 2004 - Psicosis 4.48 (Monologue of three characters)
- 2006 - Roberto Zucco
- 2007 - Hedda Gabler
- 2008 - Las Brutas
- 2009 - Orlando
- 2010 - Almedi, The Fool
- 2011 - A Doll's House
- 2013 - The Sea On The Wall
- 2013 - Trovarsi
- 2015 - The Tempest
- 2017 - Lady Marginal
- 2017 - White Rabbit. Red Rabbit
- 2017 - The Glass Menagerie
- 2020 - La Taguada
- 2020 - Cannibal
- 2020 - King Lear
- 2021 - Las Brutas
- 2022 - Oleaje
- 2023 - Hablan
