= Preciosas =

- Title card
- Also known as: Runaways
- Genre: Comedy; Action
- Created by: Catalina Calcagni
- Written by: Catalina Calcagni; Diego Muñoz; Francisca Bernardi; Simón Soto; Valentina Pollarolo
- Directed by: Herval Abreu; Enrique Aedo; Roberto Rebolledo
- Creative director: Herval Abreu
- Starring: Loreto Aravena; Pablo Macaya; Paulo Brunetti
- Opening theme: Preciosa libertad by Francis Fellizeri
- Country of origin: Chile
- Original language: Spanish
- No. of episodes: 94

Production
- Executive producer: Herval Abreu
- Producers: Bernardita Mosso; Tatiana Acevedo
- Production locations: Santiago, Chile
- Running time: 60-90 minutes
- Production company: Canal 13

Original release
- Network: Canal 13
- Release: August 1, 2016 – January 31, 2017

Related
- Veinteañero a los 40; Soltera otra vez 3

Preciosas (lit: Beautiful) also known as Runaways, is a Chilean television series created by Catalina Calcagni, that aired on Canal 13 from August 1, 2016, to January 31, 2017, starring Loreto Aravena, Pablo Macaya, and Paulo Brunetti. The series follows a group of women convicts from a high security prison in Santiago, and the relationship between its members, when they escape from prison. With freedom they are confronted with never before faced adventures and challenges, including national persecution by police, while the media keep all Chile informed of their movements, then nicknaming the group as Preciosas.

Comprising a total of 94 episodes, the series feature a primary storyline set on Lorena Martínez, an innocent woman accused of murder with a dramatic court case, that had hidden evidence and instances of falsification of relevant information, however she is the secret lover of the case prosecutor who blames her. Preciosas became an Internet phenomenon in Chile, taking the first position as a Trending topic in its country of origin and worldwide in the social network Twitter, surpassing its television competition and obtaining high numbers of followers in social networks like Facebook.

== Cast ==
=== Main characters ===
- Loreto Aravena as Lorena Martínez García / Angelina Jolie Pérez Soto (alias The hammer).
- Pablo Macaya as Alex Castillo Hertz.
- Paulo Brunetti as Ismael Domínguez.

=== Supporting characters ===
Related to Preciosas band

- Paz Bascuñán as Frida Segovia / Estrella Anís Lagos Fuentes(alias La jugo).
- Lorena Bosch as Montserrat Flores / Cecilia Diana Casán (alias La Come Momias).
- Susana Hidalgo as Lisette Parra / Yulissa Constantina Del Pino Del Bosque (alias Crespita Parra).
- Malucha Pinto as Marta Brosic (alias La Superiora).
- Tamara Acosta as Elsa Morales Carmona (alias La Loca).
- Karla Melo as Paola Romina Farfán Vilches (alias Palo Santo).
- Cristián Arriagada as Darío Mardones Brosic.
- Nicolás Poblete as Eric Ibarra (alias Príncipe Eric, El Barsa).
- Simoney Romero as María Camila Pérez (alias Perla Negra).
- Oliver Borner as Matías Mardones Brosic.

Related to Márquez family

- Cristián Campos as Arturo Márquez.
- Alessandra Guerzoni as Victoria Walker.
- Elvira Cristi as Florencia Márquez.
- Lucy Cominetti as Begoña Salinas.
- Eusebio Arenas as Vicente Márquez (alias Vicho).
- Geraldine Neary as Gabriela Martínez García (alias Yuyo).
- Teresa Münchmeyer as María Elena Hernández (alias Nena).

Related to police department

- José Secall as Patricio Teodoro Rojas (Chief).
- Josefina Montané as Amanda Rojas (Detective).
- Eyal Meyer as Nicolás Infante (Detective).

=== Guest appearances ===
- Francisco Pérez-Bannen as Juan Pablo Correa (ep. 1, 94).
- Miguel Acuña as TV reporter (ep. 1, 94).
- Verónica González as Prison officer (ep. 1-2, 94).
- Maureen Junott as Amiga de Montserrat (ep. 4-5).
- Catalina González as Sofía Jimenez Ramos (ep. 8-9, 45, 90).
- Marcela Medel as María Ester Suárez (ep. 28-30).
- Coca Rudolphy as Isidora (ep. 28-30).
- Carmen Barros as Adelaida (ep. 28-30).
- Jaime Omeñaca as Claudio Vilches (ep. 30-40, 90).
- Javiera Díaz de Valdés as Psychiatrist (ep. 78-80).

== Soundtrack ==
=== Releases ===
Track listing
No.	Title	Original artist	Length
1.	"Preciosa libertad"	Francis Fellizeri	3:08

=== Other songs ===
==== Characters ====
Original artist	Song	Characters
Trío Halcón Huasteco	"Prisionera"	Lorena
Camila Gallardo	"Más De La Mitad"	Lorena and Ismael
Pilot Speed	"Alright"	Lorena and Ismael
Phil Collins	"Against All Odds"	Lorena and Alex
Latin Bitman	"Airplane"	Príncipe Eric
Combo Chabela	"Yo Te Vi"	Elsa
Zara Larsson	"Lush Life"	Begoña and Florencia
Quantic & Ana Tijoux	"Entre Rejas"	Eric and Lisette
Tiago Iorc	"Coisa Linda"	Darío and Frida
Carla Morrison	"Un Beso"	Alex and Amanda
Bomba Estéreo	"Somos Dos"	Vicente and Gabriela
Kapitol	"Travel"	Vicente and Gabriela
María Colores	"Un Lugar"	Vicente and Gabriela
3 Hielos	"Never Look Behind"	Ismael and Florencia
Silvestre	"Cielo"	Nicolás and Florencia
Silvestre	"Cielo"	Nicolás and Begoña
Miguel Ríos	"Santa Lucía"	Patricio and Marta
Meghan Trainor	"No"	Begoña and Florencia

==== Locations ====
- "Fuego" by Bomba Estéreo.
- "Buenas noches, desolación" by Julieta Venegas.
- "Irresponsables" by Babasónicos.
- "No me importa nada" by Luz Casal.
- "Un año más" by La Sonora de Tommy Rey.
- "No pasa na" by La Teruka.

== Reception ==
=== Television ratings ===
Kantar Ibope Media Ratings (Chile)
Original broadcast date		Day rank	Viewership
Series premiere	August 1, 2016	8th	14.7%
Series finale	January 31, 2017	6th	14,8%
Average			10,0%

== International broadcast ==
- Ecuador: Telerama (2017).
- Middle East and North Africa: Rewayat Fox (2017-2018).
