= The Black Pimpernel =

- Directed by: Ulf Hultberg
- Written by: Bob Foss
- Starring: Michael Nyqvist; Lisa Werlinder; Claire Ross-Brown; Alvaro Uccelletti; Cristián Campos; Luis Gnecco
- Production companies: Mandala Films; Moviefan Scandinavia A/S; Original Film
- Distributed by: Nordisk Film
- Release date: 14 September 2007
- Country: Sweden
- Languages: English; Spanish

The Black Pimpernel (Swedish: Svarta nejlikan; Spanish: El Clavel negro) is a Swedish drama film directed by Ulf Hultberg and starring Michael Nyqvist and Lisa Werlinder. The film also features Kate del Castillo, Luis Gnecco and Claire Ross-Brown in a minor part.

The film is about Harald Edelstam, Sweden's ambassador to Chile, who after the military coup of Augusto Pinochet in 1973, managed to save the lives of more than 1,300 people by taking them to his embassy and transporting them to Sweden.

His name comes from the fictional hero The Scarlet Pimpernel, who saved many lives during the French Revolution.

The film was shot in Santiago, including outside the presidential palace La Moneda and at the infamous National Stadium where hundreds of prisoners were tortured and killed. It was shot starting January 2006 and opened September 14, 2007 in Sweden.
