= Cómplices (TV series) =

- Genre: Comedy drama
- Created by: Lucía Méndez; Pedro A. Torres
- Written by: Fernando Nolla; Alfredo Ballesteros
- Starring: Lucía Méndez; Marjorie de Sousa; Laura Flores; Maribel Guardia
- Composers: Gabriela García; José Castillo; Andrés Guardado
- Country of origin: Mexico
- Original language: Spanish
- No. of seasons: 1
- No. of episodes: 13

Production
- Executive producers: Lucía Mendez; Inna Payan; Luis Salinas; Patricio Cordero; Pedro A. Torres
- Cinematography: Chuy Chávez
- Editor: Daniel Carvajal
- Camera setup: Multi-camera
- Production companies: Animal de Luz; Argos Televisión

Original release
- Network: Vix
- Release: 7 November 2025

Cómplices is a Mexican comedy drama television series created by Lucía Méndez and Pedro A. Torres. It stars Méndez, alongside Marjorie de Sousa, Laura Flores and Maribel Guardia. It premiered on Vix on 7 November 2025.

== Cast ==
=== Main ===
- Lucía Méndez as María José Robledo
- Marjorie de Sousa as Stacy
- Laura Flores as Paula
- Ernesto Laguardia as Manuel Mancilla
- Emmanuel Orenday as Agent Morales
- Mónica del Carmen as Pancha
- Maribel Guardia as Roberta Castrejón

=== Recurring and guest stars ===
- Mauricio Mancera as Mike
- Jair Sánchez as Roger
- Begoña Narváez as Vanessa
- Denisha as Solange
- Tania Lizardo as Samantha
- Leonardo Daniel as Julio
- Ernesto Álvarez as Villafane
- Eduardo Tanus as Aldo
- Michael Waisman as Byron
- Dolores Ugalde as Diana
- Manelyk González as Elsa la reguetonera
- Jesús Castro as Nicolas
- Francisco de la O as Chava
- Santiago Torres as Iñaki
- Omar Medina as Agent Casillas
- Dolores Ugalde as Diana
- Natalia Payan as Margarita
- Lisardo as Daniel
- Arenna Valle as Corina
- Luz Aldán as Eva
- César Doroteo as Freddy
- Jessica Esotérica as Candela
- Héctor de la Hoya as Yako
- Anna Ciocchetti as Mona Rojas
- Gary Centeno as Poncho
- Roxana Castellanos as Carolina Mancilla
- Andrea Legarreta as Rachel Garcia
- Maryfer Centeno as herself
- Miguel Burra as Teofilo
- Fercho Nolla as Aguinaldo

== Episodes ==
No.	Title	Directed by	Original release date
1	"Muerte"	Salvador Espinosa	7 November 2025
2	"Escándalo"	Salvador Espinosa	7 November 2025
3	"Catarsis"	Salvador Espinosa	7 November 2025
4	"Paranoia"	Salvador Espinosa	7 November 2025
5	"Lujuria"	Salvador Espinosa	7 November 2025
6	"Avaricia"	Salvador Espinosa	7 November 2025
7	"Diversidad"	Salvador Espinosa	7 November 2025
8	"Acusadas"	Fernando Nolla & Alfredo Ballesteros	7 November 2025
9	"Ahogadas"	Magaby García	7 November 2025
10	"Famosas"	Magaby García	7 November 2025
11	"Atrapadas"	Magaby García	7 November 2025
12	"La fuga"	Magaby García	7 November 2025
13	"La verdad"	Magaby García	7 November 2025

== Production ==
Filming of the series began on 1 August 2024. The series premiered on 7 November 2025.
