= Soltera otra vez =

- Title card
- Created by: Carolina Aguirre
- Directed by: Herval Abreu
- Starring: Paz Bascuñán; Cristián Arriagada; Josefina Montané; Pablo Macaya; Loreto Aravena; Nicolás Poblete; Lorena Bosch; Héctor Morales; Aranzazú Yankovic; Roderick Teerink
- Opening theme: Hoy by Nicole
- Country of origin: Chile
- Original language: Spanish
- No. of seasons: 3
- No. of episodes: 225

Production
- Executive producers: Herval Abreu; Matías Ovalle
- Running time: 60 minutes
- Production company: Canal 13

Original release
- Network: Canal 13
- Release: 27 May 2012 – 12 September 2018

Soltera otra vez (Single Again) is a Chilean telenovela produced and broadcast by Canal 13. The story follows Cristina Moreno and her adventures to find love.

Its first episode was released on 27 May 2012. The second season was released on 21 July 2013 and the third season on 5 March 2018.

== Cast ==
- Paz Bascuñán as Cristina "Cristi" Moreno
- Cristián Arriagada as Rodrigo "Monito" González
- Josefina Montané as Nicole Cerutti "La Flexible"
- Pablo Macaya as Álvaro Vergara
- Loreto Aravena as Susana "Susy" Sánchez
- Nicolás Poblete as Zamir "Turco" Célis
- Lorena Bosch as Mirna Fabiola"negra" Meneses
- Héctor Morales as Aliro Moreno
- Aranzazú Yankovic as Camila Montes
- Ignacio Garmendia as Rafael Campos
- Catalina Guerra as Milena Simunovic
- Luis Gnecco as Sergio "Pelao" Monroy
- Solange Lackington as Luisa Tapia
- Julio González as Waldo López
- Juanita Ringeling as Martina Ivanov
- Álvaro Gómez as León Fernández
- Constanza Rojas as Pascuala Vergara
- Antonella Orsini as Úrsula Garagaytia
- Maricarmen Arrigorriaga as Rebeca Riesling
- Roderick Teerink as Sven

Special participations

- Elisa Zulueta as Marjorie Delgado (season 1)
- Andrés Gormaz as "Jamaica" (season 1)

=== Guests ===
Season 1

- Paulo Brunetti - Gustavo
- Daniel Alcaíno - Bernardo
- Eusebio Arenas - Denis
- Osvaldo Silva - Cristóbal Cerutti
- Fernando Kliche - Rudy
- Gonzalo Valenzuela - Santiago Schmidt
- Guido Vecchiola - Tomás Echeverría
- Ariel Levy - Exequiel Echeverría
- Elvira Cristi - Loretta
- Juan Pablo Sáez - Renato
- Nicolás Fontaine - Mario
- José Martínez - Pablo
- Eyal Meyer - Víctor
- Pablo Casals - Flavio
- Santiago Tupper - Raimundo Soto
- Catherine Mazoyer - Marcia
- Sebastián Dahm - Pedro
- Alessandra Guerzoni - Pamela Middleton
- Patricio Strahovsky - Rudy's friend
- Andrea Zuckermann - Denis' mother
- Coca Rudolphy - Sra. Tita
- Lisette Lastra - Amiga
- Alejandro Trejo - Dr. Vasconcellos
- Teresa Münchmeyer - Margarita
- Fedra Vergara
- Gonzalo Ducheylard - Peter
- Nicolás Soto - Ignacio

Season 2

- Berta Lasala - Vannesa Castillo
- Francesca Ratto - Javiera
- Álvaro Viguera - Alan
- Consuelo Holzapfel - Eliana
- Silvia Santelices - Nelly
- Felipe Armas
- Mabel Farías - Pilar
- Carolina Stone - Pamela
- Carolina López - Ingrid
- Constanza Rojas - Pascuala Vergara
- Emilio Sutherland - himself
