= TV Chile =

- Country: Chile
- Broadcast area: Chile; Worldwide
- Network: Televisión Nacional de Chile
- Headquarters: Santiago, Chile

Programming
- Language: Spanish
- Picture format: 1080i HDTV (downscaled to 480i/576i for the SD feed)

Ownership
- Owner: Televisión Nacional de Chile
- Sister channels: Canal 24 Horas

History
- Launched: 1989; 36 years ago
- Former names: Televisión Nacional de Chile (1989-1992); Televisión Nacional de Chile Imagen Internacional (1992-1995)

Links
- Website: http://www.tvchile.cl

Availability

Streaming media
- DirecTV Stream: Internet Protocol television

TV Chile is a Chilean pay television network that airs from Santiago, Chile. It is the international feed of the National Television of Chile.

== History ==
The first national satellite broadcasts of TVN began in 1986, reaching also some parts of Latin America. TV Chile, as an independent signal from TVN, began officially in 1989.

Things would change radically for the network during the 2000s, when it made a contract with DirecTV, which allowed TV Chile to reach over 140 countries worldwide, which roughly constitutes 66 percent of the world's countries.

The channel's current programming consists basically of variety and music shows, as well as programs dedicated to tourism, comedy and news.

In the year 2000, TV Chile was able to reach Australia for the first time after signing a television contract with TARBS. The service has been intermittently operating, as once TARBS shut down operations in 2004, UBI World TV began carrying it. The channel is currently being distributed in the region via Luso Vision.

== Signal structure ==
- International signal: covers all Asia, Americas including Chile, Europe and Oceania countries. Use as reference the timetables of Santiago (UTC-4/-3), Bogotá (UTC-5), Buenos Aires (UTC-3) and Miami (UTC-5/-4).
