= Héctor Morales (actor) =

Chilean actor (born 1982)

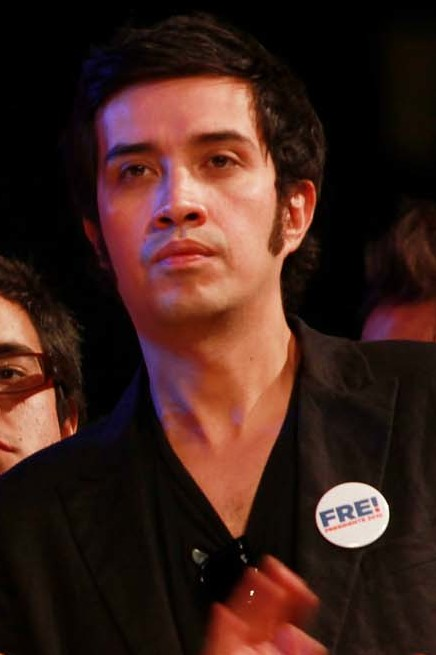
- Morales in 2010
- Born: 1 April 1982 (age 44); Santiago, Chile
- Education: University of Chile (BA)
- Occupation: Actor
- Years active: 2004-present

Héctor Mauricio Morales Bettancourt (born 1 April 1980) is a Chilean actor. He appeared in more than twenty films since 2004. Morales is best known for his performance as Goyo in the 2008 film Tony Manero
