= Daniel Muñoz (actor) =

Chilean actor, comedian, and folklorist

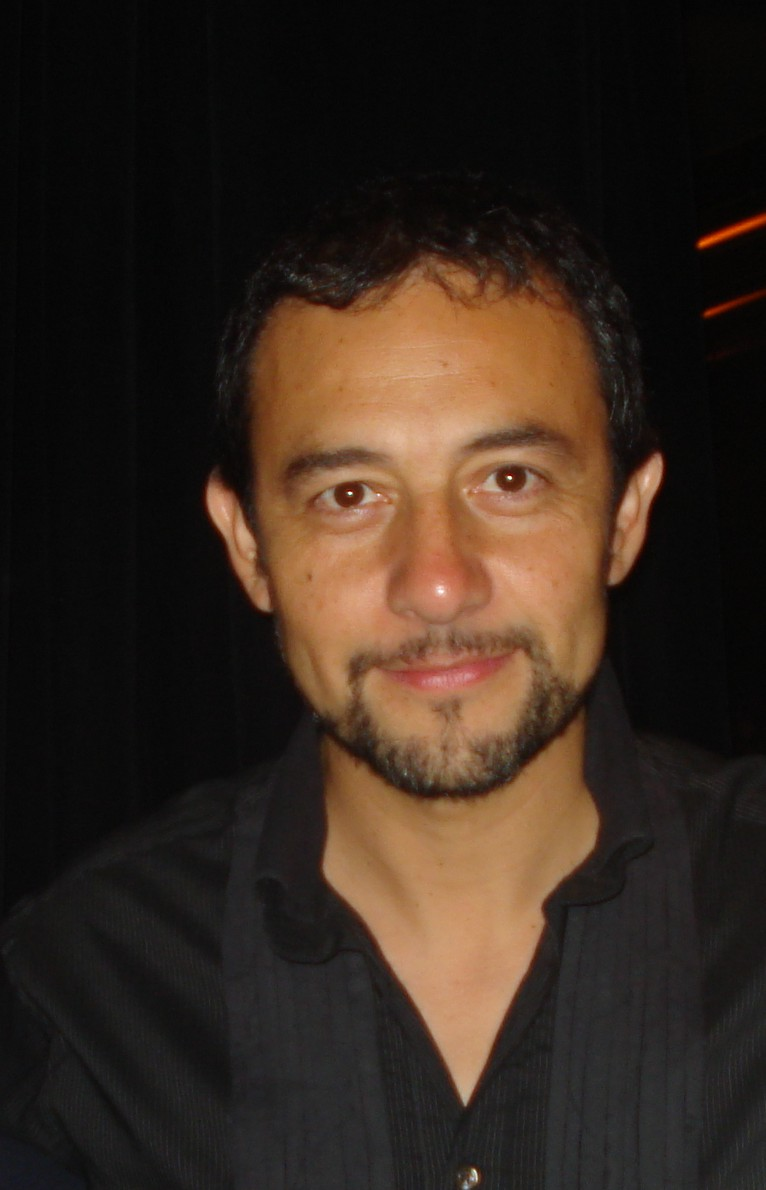
- Daniel Muñoz in 2008
- Born: 11 February 1966 (age 60); San Fernando, Chile
- Occupations: Actor, comedian, singer
- Years active: 1982–present

Daniel Patricio Muñoz Bravo (born 11 February 1966) is a Chilean actor, comedian, and cueca singer.

His extensive curriculum has enshrined him as one of the most important actors in his country. He is famous both for his comic characters in television as El Efe, El Malo, El Chanta, El Sha and El Carmelo, and also for more dramatic roles in film and television; highlighting his starring role as Juan Herrera in the acclaimed Los 80 of Channel 13, as the private detective Donovan Huaiquimán in Huaiquimán and Tolosa, as Juan "Lennon" in the film The Sentimental Teaser, as Chavelo in the film A Cab for Three, as Salvador Allende in Allende en su laberinto and as Roberto Parra Sandoval in You Broke my Heart.

== Early and personal life ==
He was born in San Fernando and studied at the theater school of the University of Chile, graduating in 1988 with the play "El alma buena de Se Chuan". He lived his childhood with his grandmother, aunt, mother and sister. His parents would divorce when he was 11. His musical roots begin in childhood after his grandmother inserted him into the world of cueca and folklore.

He married Enoe Carolina Coulon for the first time in the late 1980s, who he would have his first daughter with: Lilamaria. On a trip to Berlin with the Green Hat Theater company, he met Heidrun Breier, whom he had a son with in 1998: Gabriel.

== Acting career ==
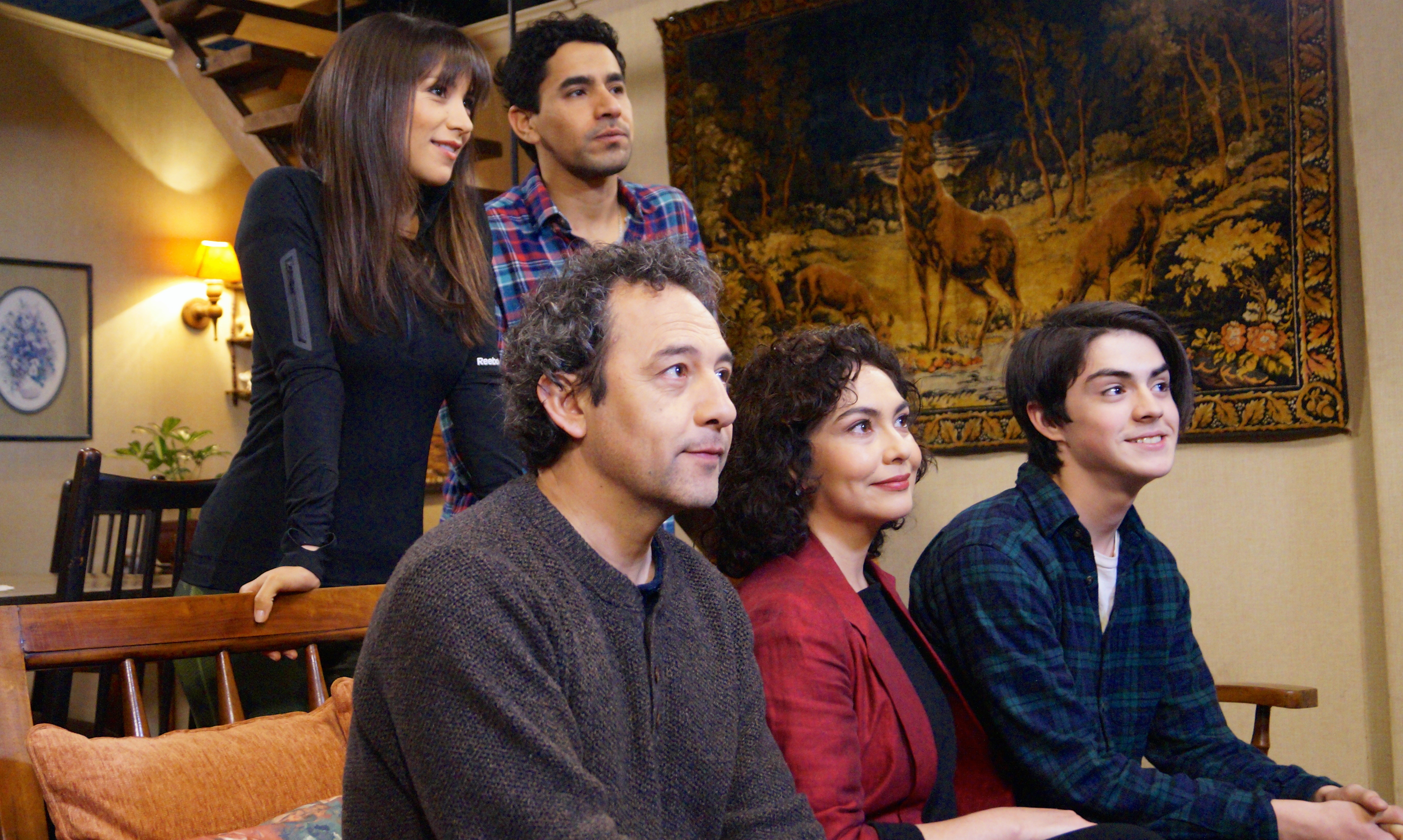
With the main cast of Los 80.

In 1987, he auditioned for the program Sábados Gigantes where they were looking for a young actor to play a humorous character. It is at that moment when his first character recognized and acclaimed by the public is born; El Efe is a young man who appears to be more popular and useful than he really is. Such was the success and fame of the character that people recognized him in the streets and he even starred in an advertising campaign and a commercial for television characterized as this character, which generated a situation of discomfort in the actor that triggered him to leave television to dedicate to theater.

In 1992 he joins the new cast of Jappening with Ja in Megavisión. Where he gave life to the son of Willy Zañartu and Señora Pochi, Willy Zañartu Jr. or "Willito", a pizza maker who could never make the delivery since he appeared in different places week after week, and "Ivan Zamorano" in the parody of a very popular wine commercial at the time. There he was until the end of the 1993 season.

In 1997 he appears in the humorous program Na' que ver con Chile where another of his most famous performances is born: El Malo, a young marginal. It was a regular show in Venga conmigo conducted by José Alfredo Fuentes, and prime Canal 13 show Viva el lunes. The popularity of the character caused him to be recruited for the Viña del Mar International Song Festival in the year 2000 where the character was presented for the last time. That is until 2010 when he appeared in a government commercial that warns about taking care of passwords and confidential information of bank users in the face of massive information theft.

A year later he would create Carmelo where he rescued his country roots. It is next to Carmelo where he begins his direct approach with the cueca. Carmelo managed to become a popular phenomenon for which he is once again invited to the Quinta Vergara.

Already recognized in comedy, his acting consolidation would come in Los 80 in 2008 with the role of the character Juan Herrera, a middle-class father who has to support his three children and wife during the military dictatorship in 1980s Chile. He won two Altazor awards for best actor for his portrayal. The series has become a cult object for the public.

As a film actor he was chosen as the best actor at the Iberoamerican Film Festival of Bolivia (2002) and winner of an APES award for his role in the film A Cab for Three. He also participated in the films Historias de Fútbol and El Chacotero Sentimental, achieving international success and (added to his performance in El Desquite) an Altazor Award for best film actor of 2000. In 2007 he acted in Radio Corazón, the sequel of El Chacotero Sentimental which eared him a new Altazor nomination.

In 2015 he starred as Salvador Allende in the film Allende en su laberinto, directed by Miguel Littin.

== Music career ==
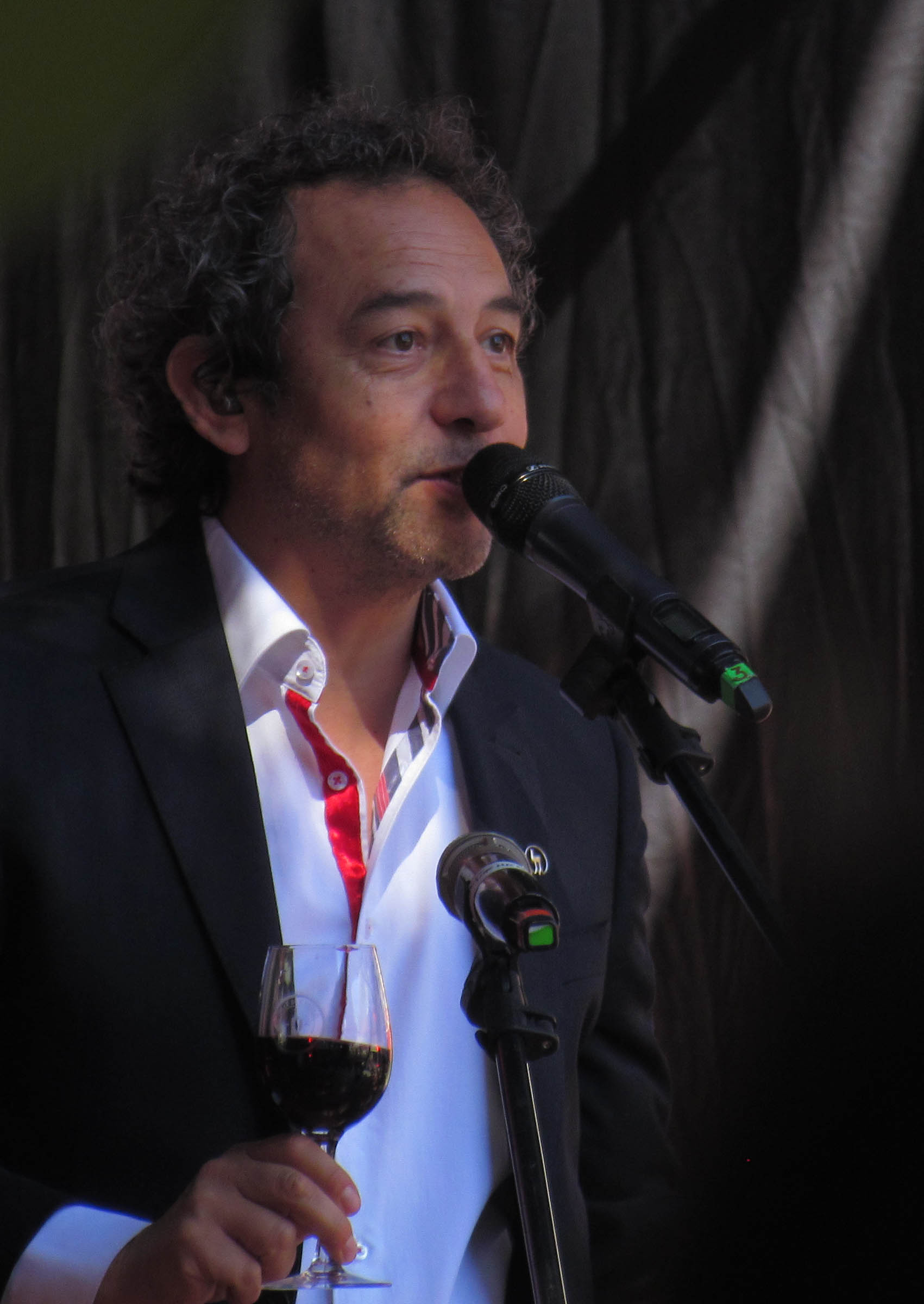
Muñoz singing in 2016

He has also ventured into the musical field, as a cueca brava singer, being a vocalist for the group 3x7 Veintiuna.

In the 2002 Cuecazo del Roto Chileno he met Félix Llancafil, voice of Los Chacareros de Paine. Muñoz's work on records by Los Chileneros, Los Tricolores and Héctor Pavez served as artistic support to unite him with Llancafil, who has been in charge of vocals and accordion in 3 x 7 Veintiuna, since 2005. The group promotes a type of elegant urban, and socially aware cueca. In 2005 they released their first album called Cuecas como las canta el roto which incorporates compositions by people like Fernando González Marabolí and Nano Nuñez and included three of the cuecas written by Pablo Neruda in tribute to Manuel Rodríguez.

In 2007 they are invited to the Festival del Huaso de Olmué. The same year they released their second album called La Otra Patita.

Finally his third studio work, Al compás del 6 x 8, would be the consolidation of the group in the national music scene. Critical acclaim would lead it to win an Altazor award in 2010 for "best album of traditional or root folk music". In 2012 he returns to the Quinta Vergara, on the third day of the Viña del Mar Festival, now as a singer.

In 2013 he released an album with his new band called Los Marujos, entitled Cueca, and in 2015 another one called Tirando Patá.

In 2020 he released a new album with another band called Los 30 pesos, entitled Crónicas de una revuelta in clear reference to Estallido social.

== Filmography ==
=== Films ===
Year	Film	Role	Director	Notes
1991	Manila		Antonio Chavarrías	
1995	Tierra y libertad		Ken Loach	
1997	Historias de fútbol	Carlos González	Andrés Wood	
1998	Un héroe llamado José		Jorge Olguín	
1999	El desquite	Manuel Salazar	Andrés Wood	Altazor Award Best film actor
1999	El Chacotero Sentimental	Juan	Cristián Galaz	Altazor Award Best film actor
2001	Taxi para Tres	Chavelo	Orlando Lübbert	APES Award Best film actor Nominee—Altazor Award Best film actor
2002	El fotógrafo	Simón Cortázar	Sebastián Alarcón	
2003	Un regalo para el alma	Aceituno	Patricio Espinoza	
2004	Azul y Blanco	Bernardo	Sebastián Araya	
2007	Fiestapatria	Ray	Luis R. Vera	
2007	Casa de remolienda	Valentín	Joaquín Eyzaguirre	
2007	Radio Corazón	Manolo Tapia	Roberto Artiagoitía	Nominee—Altazor Award Best film actor
2008	Vestido	Osvaldo	Jairo Boisier	
2011	Sentados frente al fuego	Daniel	Alejandro Fernandez Almendras	
2014	El Cordero	Domingo	Juan Francisco Olea	
2015	Allende en su laberinto	Salvador Allende	Miguel Littín	
2016	Rara		Pepa San Martín	
2017	Se busca novio... para mi mujer		Diego Rougier	
2018	El Taller		José Tomás Videla	
2019	Mi amigo Alexis		Alejandro Fernández Almendras	
2021	(Im)Patient	Boris	Constanza Fernández Bertrand	
2024	The Wild Years		Andrés Nazarala	
2025	You Broke my Heart	Roberto Parra Sandoval	Boris Quercia	
2026	Mil Pedazos		Sergio Castro San Martín	

=== Telenovelas ===
Año	Título	Papel	Canal	Notas
1994	Top Secret	Panchito	Canal 13	
1997	Eclipse de luna	Sandro	Canal 13	
1998	Amándote	Horacio	Canal 13	
2010	Primera Dama	Himself	Canal 13	
2017	Un diablo con ángel	Benito / Ángel Bonilla	TVN	Protagónico
2018	Si yo fuera rico	Erick Ferrada	Mega	Antagónico

=== TV Series ===
Year	Show	Role	Channel	Notes
2002	Is Harry on the Boat?	Tony	Sky 1	Episode #6
2003, 2004, 2006	La vida es una lotería	Ricardo Cuevas	TVN	Episodio: "Ricardo Cuevas, el único ganador"
2003, 2004, 2006	La vida es una lotería	Ramón	TVN	Episode: "Ramón de Patronato"
2003, 2004, 2006	La vida es una lotería	Patricio	TVN	Episode: "El cariño del padre"
2005	El cuento del tío	Lalo	TVN	Episode: "El arriendo"
2005	Los Simuladores	Jorge	Canal 13	2 episodes
2005	La Nany	Carlos	Mega	Episode: "La tortuga"
2005, 2006	Tiempo Final	Franco	TVN	Episode: "El anzuelo"
2005, 2006	Tiempo Final	Julio	TVN	Episode: "Cita online"
2006	La otra cara del espejo	Joaquín	TVN	Episode: "La trampa/La última broma"
2006	JPT: Justicia Para Todos	Retamal	TVN	Episode: "Cancha mortal"
2006, 2008	Huaiquimán y Tolosa	Donovan Huaiquiman	Canal 13	24 episodes Altazor Award al Mejor actor de televisión (2007)
2007	Héroes	José de San Martín	Canal 13	2 episodes
2008– 2014	Los 80	Juan Herrera	Canal 13	72 episodes Altazor Award Best TV actor (2009–2010); Nominadee—Altazor Award al Mejor actor de televisión (2011–2012); Nominadee—TV Grama Awards al Mejor actor (2009–2012); Nominadee—Copihue de Oro al Mejor actor (2011–2012)
2012	Vida por vida	Dr. Samuel Vásquez	Canal 13	13 episodes
2015	Príncipes de barrio	Manuel Rojas	Canal 13	Premio Caleuche al Mejor actor protagónico en series y/o miniseries (2016)
2015	Zamudio	Iván Zamudio	TVN	4 episodes
2015	Juana Brava	Charles	TVN	
2016	Por Fin Solos	Roberto Aguilera	TVN	24 episodes
2017	Ramona	Héctor Carter	TVN	
2018	Santiago Paranormal		TVN	1 episode
2018	Casa de Angelis	Farid Chadud	TVN	
2019	La vida simplemente	Don Antonio	La Red	
2019	Berko: El arte de callar		Fox	
2020	La Jauría	Ibarra	Amazon	
2022	42 Days of Darkness	Arturo Fernandez	Netflix	

== Discography ==
=== With 3x7 Veintiuna ===
- 2006 - Cuecas como las canta el roto
- 2007 - La otra patita
- 2009 - Al compás del 6 x 8
- 2010 - En vivo... pa' los vivos
- 2011 - Viejos lindos... pero cuando eran guaguas

=== With Los Marujos ===
- 2013 - Cueca
- 2015 - Tirando Patá

=== With Los 30 Pesos ===
- 2020 - Crónicas de una revuelta
