= 2000 Altazor Awards =

1st Altazor Awards
- Date: March 30, 2000
- Venue: Teatro Municipal de Santiago
- Country: Chile

Television/radio coverage
- Network: TVN

The first annual Altazor Awards 2000 took place on March 30, 2000, at the Teatro Municipal de Santiago. The nominees were announced on March 20.

== Nominations ==
Winners are in bold text.

=== Literary Arts ===
==== Narrative ====
- Poli Délano – La Cola
- Rafael Gumucio – Memorias Prematuras
- Hernán Rivera Letelier – Donde mueren los valientes
- **Antonio Skármeta – La Boda del Poeta**

==== Poetry ====
- **Efraín Barquero – Antología**
- Claudio Bertoni – Una Carta
- José María Memet – Amanecer sin dioses
- Armando Uribe – Imágenes quebradas

=== Visual Arts ===
==== Painting ====
- Gracia Barrios – Escenas de pintura local
- Sammy Benmayor – Estudios Antropológicos
- **Roser Bru – Homenaje a Goya**
- Bruna Truffa and Rodrigo Cabezas – Si vas para Chile

==== Sculpture ====
- Federico Assler – Flora y Ferrum
- Francisco Gacitua – Cordillera de los Andes
- **Osvaldo Peña – El Puente**
- Norma Ramírez – Cuerpo

==== Engraving and Drawing ====
- Francisco Copello – Retrospectiva de Francisco Copello
- **Santos Chávez – Grabados**
- Teresa Gazitúa – Sus palmas están a la vista
- Natasha Pons – Blanco y Negro

==== Installation art and Video art ====
- Rodrigo Cabezas and Bruna Truffa – Si vas para Chile
- **Gonzalo Díaz – Unidos en la gloria y en la muerte**
- Ismael Frigerio – Anatomía Monumental

==== Photography ====
- Enrique Cerda – Instantáneas
- Alvaro Larco – De la cordillera al mar
- **Mariana Mathews – Adoremos**
- Rodrigo and Diego Opazo – Photokontexto

=== Performing Arts Theatre ===
==== Dramaturgy ====
- Jorge Díaz – Nadie es profeta en su espejo and El velero en la botella
- Marco Antonio de la Parra – Madrid Sarajevo and La puta madre
- Juan Radrigán Rojas – Hechos consumados
- **La Troppa – Gemelos**

==== Director ====
- Ricardo Balic – Las copas de la ira
- Alfredo Castro – Hechos Consumados
- Ramón Griffero – Brunch
- **La Troppa – Gemelos**

==== Actor ====
- Carlos Concha – Las Copas de la Ira
- **Jaime Lorca – Gemelos**
- José Soza – Hechos Consumados
- Alberto Vega – Art

==== Actress ====
- Amparo Noguera – Hechos Consumados
- Elsa Pobrete – La viuda de Apablaza
- **Laura Pizarro – Gemelos**
- Tichy Lobos – Quien con niños se acuesta amanece mojado

=== Performing Arts Dance ===
==== Choreography ====
- **Luis Eduardo Araneda – Terenae**
- Nelson Avilés – Hombres en círculo durante el Hechizo del tiempo
- Vicky Larraín – El cuerpo en el barro
- Francisca Sazié – Zero

==== Male Dancer ====
- Mauricio Barahona
- **Alfredo Bravo**
- Luis Ortigoza
- José Luis Vidal

==== Female Dancer ====
- Carola Alvear
- **Magdalena Bahamondes**
- Viviana Romo
- Rayén Soto

=== Musical Arts ===
==== Classical music ====
- **Ensemble Bartok – América en vanguardia**
- Alejandro Guarello – Alejandro Guarello
- Carmen Luisa Letelier – CD Recording of Federico Heinlein and Homage to Domingo Santa Cruz
- Miguel Villafruela – Promotion and dissemination of Chilean music

==== Traditional music ====
- Banda Bordemar – Bordemar al abordaje
- Víctor Hugo Campusano – Altamar y La Cueca Pulenta
- Quelentaro – El Poder de Quelentaro
- **Pedro Yáñez Contribution to the creation and dissemination trova Ridge**

==== Ballad ====
- **Pablo Herrera – Yo voy contigo**
- Luis Jara – Lo Nuestro...Ayer y Hoy
- Alberto Plaza – Polvo de Estrellas
- La Sociedad – Corazón Latino

==== Pop/Rock ====
- Dracma – Dracma
- La Pozze Latina – Desde el mundo de los espejos
- Makiza – Aerolíneas
- **Joe Vasconcellos – Vivo**

==== Alternative/Jazz ====
- Francesca Ancarola – Que el Canto tiene Sentido
- Alberto Cumplido – Atermporal
- La Chimuchina – Sonchapu
- **Antonio Restucci – Vetas**

==== Playing ====
- René Arangua (piano and keyboards)
- **Cristián Gálvez (bass)**
- Patricio Pailamilla (trumpet)

=== Media Arts Film ===
==== Director ====
- Juan Vicente Araya – No tan lejos de Andrómeda
- **Cristián Galaz – El Chacotero Sentimental: La película**
- Gonzalo Justiniano – Tuve un sueño contigo
- Andrés Wood – El Desquite

==== Screenplay ====
- Juan Vicente Araya – No tan lejos de Andrómeda
- **Mateo Iribarren – El Chacotero Sentimental: La película**
- Boris Quercia and Andrés Wood – El Desquite
- Gonzalo Justiniano – Tuve un sueño contigo

==== Actor ====
- Pablo Macaya – El Chacotero Sentimental: La película
- **Daniel Muñoz – El Desquite and El Chacotero Sentimental: La película**
- Álvaro Rudolphy – El Entusiasmo
- Nelson Villagra – Telefilms TVN

==== Actress ====
- **Tamara Acosta – El Desquite and El Chacotero Sentimental: La película**
- Claudia Celedón – El Chacotero Sentimental: La película
- Patricia López – El Desquite
- Lorene Prieto – El Chacotero Sentimental: La película

==== Creative Contribution ====
- **Juan Vicente Araya (Original Idea)**
- Rumpy and Cristián Galaz (Original Idea and new form of filmmaking)
- Miguel Joannis Littin (Cinematography of El Desquite)

=== Media Arts TV ===
==== Director ====
- Christián Leighton – Los Patiperros
- Rodrigo Moreno – Ovni
- Vicente Sabatini – La Fiera
- **Alvaro Díaz and Pedro Peirano – Factor Humano**

==== Screenplay ====
- Fernando Aragón, Hugo Morales, Arnaldo Madrid and Nona Fernández – Aquelarre
- Sebastián Arrau and Coca Gómez – Cerro Alegre
- Pablo Illanes – Fuera de Control
- **Víctor Carrasco, René Arcos, Alejandro Cabrera and Larisa Contreras – La Fiera**

==== Actor ====
- **Luis Alarcón – La Fiera**
- Alfredo Castro – La Fiera
- Francisco Melo – La Fiera
- Mauricio Pesutic – Aquelarre
- José Soza – La Fiera

==== Actress ====
- Maricarmen Arrigorriaga – Aquelarre
- Roxana Campos – La Fiera
- María Izquierdo - Cerro Alegre
- Aline Kuppenheim – La Fiera
- **Paulina Urrutia – Fuera de Control**

==== Creative Contribution ====
- Sergio Bravo, Luis Ponce, Gilberto Villarroel and Roberto Brodsky (Screenplay of Nuestro Siglo)
- Carlos Leppe (Creative and Art Director of TVN)
- **Cristián Warkner and Gerardo Cáceres (Original Idea and Screenplay of Caja Negra)**
- Antonio Skármeta (Original Idea and Screenplay of El Show de los Libros)
