= Alberto Montt =

Ecuatorian artist

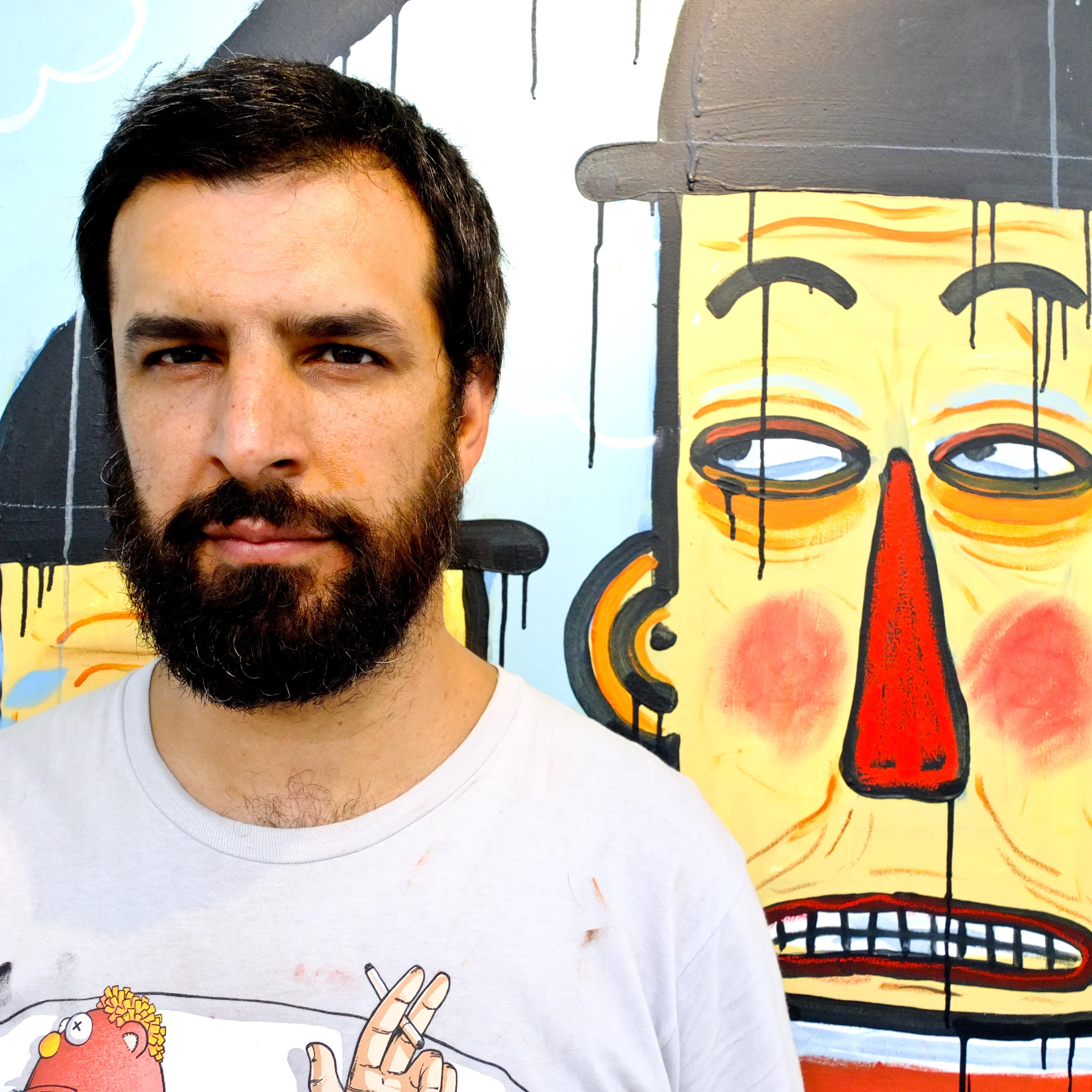
- Alberto Montt, 2012.
- Born: Alberto José Montt Moscoso; December 22, 1972; Quito, Ecuador
- Known for: Plastic arts Illustration; Graphic design

Alberto Montt on the book fair Frankfurt (Germany) in 2026.

Alberto José Montt Moscoso (Quito, Ecuador, December 22, 1972) is a Chilean graphic designer and plastic artist mainly known for his online comic-strip Dosis diarias, (in English, Daily Doses), where he has published since 2006 until today.

He was born in Ecuador as the son of Alberto Montt (Chilean) and Consuelo Moscoso (Ecuadorian). His maternal grandfather was the first cousin of Piedad Moscoso Serrano and great-nephew of Victor Emilio Moscoso Cárdenas. He studied graphic design and plastic arts in Quito. After graduation, he founded a design firm, and published his works on the magazines Gestión, Diners Club and the newspaper supplement «La pandilla» in El Comercio.

In 1998 he moved to Santiago de Chile. His first job was as an op-ed writer for the newspaper El Mercurio. Afterwards, he worked for the magazines Qué Pasa, Capital and Blank, in addition to illustrating several child books.

He has published several illustration books, including, Para ver y no creer (2001), En dosis diarias (2008), ¡Mecachendié! (2012), and El código de la amistad de Chivas Regal (2012). In 2010, he was nominated for a 2010 Altazor Awards in the «Graphic design and illustration» category for his participation in the book Recetas al pie de la letra. The following year, the broadcast network Deutsche Welle awarded him with The BOBs to «Best Spanish language Blog» for Dosis diarias.
