= 2001 Altazor Awards =

2nd Altazor Awards
- Date: March 26, 2001
- Venue: Teatro Municipal de Santiago
- Country: Chile

Television/radio coverage
- Network: TVN

The second annual Altazor Awards took place on March 26, 2001, at the Teatro Municipal de Santiago.

== Nominations ==
=== Literary Arts ===
==== Narrative ====
- Alejandra Costamagna – Las malas noches
- Adolfo Couve – Cuando pienso en mi falta de cabeza
- Hernán Rivera Letelier – Los trenes se van al purgatorio
- Mauricio Wacquez – Epifanía de una sombra

==== Poetry ====
- Delia Domínguez – Huevos revueltos
- Mauricio Redolés – Estar de la poesía o el estilo de las matemáticas
- Gonzalo Rojas – Que se ama cuando se ama
- Armando Uribe – Contra la voluntad

==== Essay ====
- Diamela Eltit – Emergencias, escritos sobre Literatura, Arte y Política
- Felipe Portales – Chile: una democracia tutelada
- Volodia Teitelboim – La gran guerra de Chile y otra que nunca existió
- Raúl Zurita – Sobre el amor, el sufrimiento y el nuevo milenio

=== Visual Arts ===
==== Painting ====
- Gracia Barrios – Gracia Barrios. Pinturas 1985-2000
- Patricia Israel – El gran silencio
- Gustavo Pobrete – Integración plástica
- Eugenio Téllez – Campos de batalla

==== Sculpture ====
- Francisco Gacitúa – Buques de acero
- Norma Ramírez – Carne
- Marcela Romagnoli – Maderas y maderas
- Rosa Vicuña – Períodos

==== Engraving and Drawing ====
- Francisco Copello – Chilean Engraving of the Mercosur
- Natasha Pons – Muestra colectiva Asociación de Pintores y Escultores de Chile
- Lotty Rosenfeld – Chilean Engraving of the Mercosur

==== Installation art and Video art ====
- Carlos Altamirano – XII Muestra Anual del Museo de Arte Moderno de Chiloé
- Pamela Caviares – Plegado artificial
- Pablo Langlois – Día
- Sebastián Perece – Plegado artificial

==== Photography ====
- Jorge Brantmayer – La vida está en otra parte
- Alvaro Hoppe – El artificio del lente. Apuntes de viaje 98/00
- Alvaro Larco – Díptico
- Juan Meza-Lopehandía – Cuasimodo, correr al Cristo

=== Performing Arts Theatre ===
==== Dramaturgy ====
- Compañía Teatro Aparte – Yo, tú y ... ellos
- Marco Antonio de la Parra – La vida privada
- Jorge Díaz – Mirada obscura
- Egon Wolff – Encrucijada

==== Director ====
- Martín Erazo – Húsar de la muerte
- Ramón Griffero – Cinema Utoppia
- Gustavo Meza – Fatamorgana de amor para banda del litro
- Jaime Vadell – Yo, tú y ...ellos

==== Actor ====
- Daniel Alcaíno – Ultimo gol gana
- Rodolfo Bravo – Muerte accidental de un anarquista
- Max Corvalán – Claro de Luna
- Fernando Gallardo – Sinvergüenzas
- Pablo Schwarz – Cinema Utoppia

==== Actress ====
- Verónica García-Huidobro – Cinema Utoppia
- Maité Fernández – Santas, vírgenes y mártires
- Tichi Lobos – Venecia
- Amparo Noguera – El Coordinador

=== Performing Arts Dance ===
==== Choreography ====
- Teresa Alcaíno – Mistral
- Beatriz Alcalde – Cha Cha...!
- Nury Gutes – Seno Skyiring
- Elizabeth Rodríguez – Sin respiro

==== Male Dancer ====
- Jorge Carreño – Oskolki (Espejos quebrados)
- Andrés Maulen – Mistral
- César Morales – Coppelia
- Luis Ortigoza – Manon

==== Female Dancer ====
- Natalia Berríos – Manon
- Marcela Goicochea – Manon
- Vivian Romo – Rapsodia
- Francisca Sazié – Sin respiro

=== Musical Arts ===
==== Classical music ====
- Fernando García – Rosa perfumada entre los astros
- Guillermo Rifo – Director of the Sinfónica Juvenil 'Estrenos de obras chilenas'
- Cirilo Vila – In Memoriam B.Bartok
- Miguel Angel Villafruela – Compositores 1988-1998

==== Traditional music ====
- Chilhué – Hechicerías
- Tito Fernández – 40 años del canto popular
- Inti-Illimani – Interpreta a Víctor Jara
- Manuel Sánchez – Manuel Sánchez

==== Ballad ====
- La Sociedad – Bar de amores
- Alberto Plaza – 15 años en vivo
- Fernando Ubiergo – Los ojos del mar
- Alvaro Véliz – Alvaro Véliz

==== Pop/Rock ====
- Chancho en Piedra – Marca chancho
- Gondwana – Alabanza por la fuerza de la razón
- Supernova – Supernova

==== Alternative/Jazz ====
- Francesca Ancarola – Pasaje de ida y vuelta
- La Marraqueta – Sayhueque
- Antonio Restucci – Cenizas en el mar
- Vernáculo – Viva la chinita de Andacollo

==== Playing ====
- Marcelo Aedo (Bass)
- Christian Cuturrufo (Trumpet)
- Antonio Restucci (Acoustic guitar)

=== Media Arts Film ===
==== Director ====
- Ignacio Agüero – Aquí se construye
- Juan Carlos Bustamante – El vecino
- Silvio Caiozzi – Coronación
- Jorge Olguín – Angel negro
- Martín Rodríguez – En un lugar de la noche

==== Actor ====
- Luciano Cruz-Coke – En un lugar de la noche
- Julio Jung – Coronación
- José Soza – El vecino
- Jaime Vadell – Coronación

==== Actress ====
- María Cánepa – Coronación
- Gabriela Medina – Coronación
- Myriam Palacios – Coronación
- Adela Secal – Coronación

==== Creative Contribution ====
- Luis Advis (Music of Coronación)
- Guadalupe Bornand (Art Director of Coronación)
- Juan Carlos Bustamante, Bernardita Valenzuela and Danielle Fillios (Editing of El vecino)
- Sophie França (Editing of Aquí se construye)

=== Media Arts TV ===
==== Director ====
- Paola Castillo – El Show de los libros
- Mercedes Ducci and Patricio Hernández – Contacto
- Cristián Leighton – Patiperros
- Vicente Sabatini – Romané

==== Screenplay ====
- Fernando Aragón, Hugo Morales, Arnaldo Madrid and Nona Fernández – Aquelarre
- Sebastián Arrau and Coca Gómez – Cerro Alegre
- Pablo Illanes – Fuera de Control
- Vicente Sabatini – Romané

==== Actor ====
- Néstor Cantillana – Romané
- Alfredo Castro – Romané
- Héctor Noguera – Romané
- Mauricio Pesutic – Santoladrón

==== Actress ====
- Claudia Di Girólamo – Romané
- Francisca Imboden – Romané
- Solange Lackington – Sabor a ti
- Paulina Urrutia – Sabor a ti

==== Creative Contribution ====
- Mercedes Ducci and Patricia Undurraga (Journalistic research of the Reportajes del siglo)
- Alejandro Guillier (Host of Tolerancia Cero)
- Matías Lira (Original Format of Ocio TV)
- Gabriela Tesmer and Ricardo Astorga (Production and investigative journalism of the El Mirador)
