= 2004 Altazor Awards =

5th Altazor Awards
- Date: 5 April 2004
- Venue: Centro Cultural Matucana 100
- Country: Chile

Television/radio coverage
- Network: TVN

The fifth annual Altazor Awards took place on 5 April 2004, at the Centro Cultural Matucana 100. The nominees were announced on 22 January.

== Nominations ==
Winners are in bold text.

=== Literary Arts ===
==== Narrative ====
- **Roberto Bolaño – El gaucho Insufrible**
- Ramón Díaz Eterovic – El color de la piel
- Pedro Lemebel – Zanjón de la aguada
- Germán Marín – Un animal mudo levanta la vista

==== Poetry ====
- Óscar Hahn – Obras selectas de Oscar Hahn
- **Eduardo Llanos – Antología Presunta**
- Armando Roa – Fundación Mítica del Reino de Chile
- Raúl Zurita – INRI

==== Essay ====
- José Bengoa – Los antiguos mapuches del sur
- Miguel Castillo Didier – Kavafis íntegro
- Carla Cordua – Cabos sueltos
- **Jorge Montealegre – Frazadas del Estadio Nacional**

=== Visual Arts ===
==== Painting ====
- Carlos Altamirano – Un cuadro en que falta pintar algunas cosas
- **Bororo – Ciudadanía sobre tela**
- Ximena Cristi – A la hora de tomar chocolate
- Ismael Frigerio – Zona de construcción

==== Sculpture ====
- **Federico Assler – Roca Negra**
- José Vicente Gajardo – Sculptures of José Vicente Gajardo
- Francisco Gazitúa – Caballos de Acero
- Pilar Ovalle – El Impacto Interior

==== Engraving and Drawing ====
- Roser Bru – Roser Bru. A set of 34 of his engraving in his eightieth birthday
- Jaime Cruz – Desde las Raíces
- **Matilde Pérez – Serigrafías**
- Patricia Vargas – Cielo Raso

==== Installation art and Video art ====
- Claudio Correa – No se gana como robando
- Claudia Missana – No Palabra
- Mario Navarro – Radio Ideal
- **Ximena Zomosa – Colección de la artista**

==== Photography ====
- Roberto Edwards – La Fiesta del Cuerpo
- **Alvaro Hoppe – No a la violencia, Sí al amor**
- Marcelo Montecinos – Santiago j.p.g.
- Leonora Vicuña – Relatos Breves

=== Performing Arts Theatre ===
==== Dramaturgy ====
- Ramón Griffero – Tus deseos en Fragmentos
- **Mateo Iribarren – La Condición Humana**
- Alejandro Moreno – Mujer Gallina
- Egon Wolff – La Recomendación

==== Director ====
- Alfredo Castro – Mano de Obra
- Ramón Griffero – Tus Deseos en Fragmentos
- **Compañía La Tropa: Laura Pizarro, Jaime Lorca and Juan Carlos Zagal – Jesús Betz**
- Rodrigo Pérez – Provincia Señalada (una velada patriótica)

==== Actor ====
- Tito Bustamante – Jesús se subió al Metro
- **Jaime Lorca – Jesús Betz**
- Daniel Muñoz – Jesús se subió al Metro
- Rodolfo Pulgar – Jesús se subió al Metro

==== Actress ====
- **Claudia Celedón – Mujer Gallina**
- Paola Giannini – Mano de Obra
- Coca Guazzini – Querida Elena
- Amparo Noguera – Provincia Señalada (una velada patriótica)

=== Performing Arts Dance ===
==== Choreography ====
- **Sonia Araus – Miradas Cruzadas. Homenaje a Sara Vial**
- Nelson Avilés – Carne de Cañón
- Verónica Varas – Sobre la Piel. Ttilogía + 1
- Claudia Vicuña and Alejandro Cáceres – Proyecto Contenedor

==== Male Dancer ====
- **Jorge Carreño – Latente**
- Cesar Morales – Giselle
- Luis Ortigoza – Tanguero
- Miguel Ángel Serrano – Madama Butterfly

==== Female Dancer ====
- Carola Alvear – París-Santiago
- Carolina Bravo – Carne de Cañón
- **Paola Moret – Emergencias**
- Vivian Romo – Quisiera ser tu sombra

=== Musical Arts ===
==== Classical music ====
- Pablo Aranda – Nueve Composiciones de Cámara
- Pablo Délano – Ave María I Para Voces Femeninas
- Luis Orlandini – Simpay. Música de Cámara para Guitarra
- **Cirilo Vila – De Sueños y...**

==== Traditional music ====
- Héctor Pavez – Chiloé del 58
- **Horacio Salinas – Remos en el agua**
- Juan Antonio Sánchez – Soyobré
- Freddy Torrealba – Charango al Sur del Charango

==== Ballad ====
- **Cecilia Echenique – Brasil Amado**
- Luis Jara – Mi Destino
- Alberto Plaza – Febrero 14
- Alvaro Véliz – Mía

==== Pop/Rock ====
- **Pablo Ilabaca – 31 Minutos**
- Quique Neira – Eleven
- Papanegro – Superactivo
- Weichafe – Weichafe

==== Alternative/Jazz ====
- Claudio Araya – El fulgor (los círculos del planeta)
- **Congreso – Congreso de Exportación**
- Ernesto Holman – Ñamco
- Pablo Lecaros – Quinto Primero

==== Playing ====
- Héctor Briceño (Trombone)
- **Carlos Corales (Acoustic guitar and Electric guitar)**
- David del Pino (Direction of La Pasión según San Mateo by Johann Sebastián)
- Alberto Dourthé (Concertmaster)

=== Media Arts Film ===
==== Director Fiction ====
- Matías Bize – Sábado
- Marcelo Ferrari – Subterra
- **Boris Quercia – Sexo con Amor**
- Andrés Waissbluth – Los Debutantes

==== Director Documentary ====
- Carlos Klein – Tierra de Agua
- Pablo Perelman – Bitácora de un actor
- Verónica Quense – Triste
- **Raúl Ruiz – Cofralandes**

==== Actor ====
- Patricio Bunster – Subterra
- Boris Quercia – Sexo con Amor
- **Álvaro Rudolphy – Sexo con Amor**
- Alejandro Trejo – Los Debutantes

==== Actress ====
- Consuelo Holzapfel – Subterra
- **María Izquierdo – Sexo con Amor**
- Mariana Loyola – **Subterra**
- Gabriela Medina – Subterra

=== Media Arts TV ===
==== Director Drama ====
- **Herval Abreu – Machos**
- Beltrán "Toti" García – Francisca (Cuentos de Mujeres)
- Tatiana Gaviola – La Baby "se lee como se escribe" (Cuentos de Mujeres)
- María Eugenia Rencoret – Pecadores

==== Director TV Show ====
- **Alvaro Díaz and Pedro Peirano – 31 Minutos**
- Patricio Hernández – Testigo
- Jaime Sepúlveda – Biografías
- Rodrigo Sepúlveda – Tronia

==== Screenplay ====
- Felipe Blanco – Septiembre
- **Alvaro Díaz, Pedro Peirano, Daniel Castro and Rodrigo Salinas – 31 Minutos**
- Sebastián Arrau, Coca Gómez and Pablo Illanes – Machos
- Marcelo Leonart, Hugo Morales, Nona Fernández and Ximena Carrera – 16

==== Actor ====
- Héctor Noguera – Machos
- **José Soza – Puertas Adentro**
- Benjamín Vicuña – Pecadores
- Jorge Zabaleta – Machos

==== Actress ====
- Carolina Arregui – Machos
- Solange Lackington – Machos
- **Mariana Loyola – Machos**
- Teresita Reyes – Machos
