= Pablo Krögh =

Chilean actor (1963–2013)

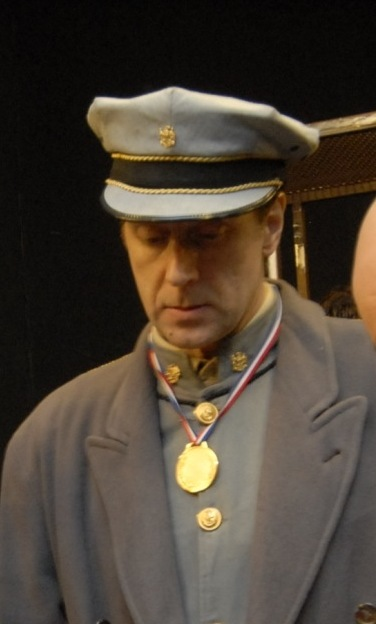
Pablo Krogh performing on stage in 2010

Pablo Willy Krögh Baraona (21 February 1963 – 2 September 2013) was a Chilean film, theater, television and voice actor. His credits included the Chilean films Machuca in 2004 and the 2009 dramatic film, Dawson Isla 10, in which he portrayed the late politician, José Tohá. His television roles included the Chilevision telenovela series, La Doña. He was starring in the TVN television series, Bim bam bum, at the time of his death in 2013.

Krögh died from tongue cancer in Santiago, Chile, at approximately 5:00 a.m. on 2 September 2013, at the age of 50. He had been diagnosed with tongue cancer in 2012. Numerous Chilean actors and directors posted tributes to Krögh on social media, including Ana Maria Gazmuri, Paula Sharim, Begoña Basauri, Lorena Capetillo, Herval Abreu and Daniel Alcaíno.

== Filmography ==
=== Films ===
Film
Year	Film	Role	Notes
1987	Sussi (film)		
1994	Hasta en las mejores familias		
2000	Coronación	Carlos joven / Locutor de radio	Voice only
2004	Machuca	Coronel Sotomayor	
2006	Rojo, la película	Ernesto Fuentes	
2007	The Toast	Carlos	
2008	El cielo, la tierra y la lluvia	Toro	
2009	Dawson Isla 10	José Tohá	Nominated for a 2010 Altazor Award Best Actor in a Film
2010	A un metro de ti		
2011	Baby Shower	Ricardo	
2011	Gente mala del Norte	Ernest Handler	Voice role
2011	El circuito de Román	Osvaldo Gatica	
2012	Joven y Alocada	Josué	
2012	La noche de enfrente		
2012	No	Director of the No campaign	
2013	Gloria	Pablo	
2013	Patagonia de los sueños	Lazlo Rabber	Entered into the Cannes Film Festival
2014	Cirqo		Post Production
