= A Cab for Three =

2001 film by Orlando Lübbert

- Spanish poster
- Directed by: Orlando Lübbert
- Written by: Orlando Lübbert
- Starring: Alejandro Trejo; Fernando Gómez Rovira; Daniel Muñoz
- Cinematography: Patricio Riquelme
- Music by: Edu Zvetelman
- Distributed by: Cebra Producciones
- Release date: 2 August 2001 (Chile)
- Country: Chile
- Language: Spanish

A Cab for Three (Spanish: Taxi para tres) is a 2001 Chilean crime comedy-drama film directed by Orlando Lubbert. It was Chile's submission to the 74th Academy Awards for the Academy Award for Best Foreign Language Film, but was not accepted as a nominee.

In the film, two criminals rob a taxi driver. But they give him a choice between joining their gang or becoming their hostage. He chooses to join them, and he is soon receiving his own share from the gang's loot. The story focuses on the normalization of gang activity in his life, and the way the other gang members become part of the driver's family life.

== Plot ==
Ulises (Alejandro Trejo) is a taxi driver who gets robbed by Chavelo (Daniel Muñoz) and Coto (Fernando Gómez-Rovira). They give him a choice between driving the taxi while they commit robberies or riding in the trunk, using the phrase "Wheel or trunk." This makes Ulises a member of their gang. After several failed and some successful robberies, Ulises begins to receive a share of the loot. What he once believed was immoral and wrong becomes normalized for him. The robbers even stay in Ulises' home and give gifts to his family, leading them to also cover up for the gang.

Soon, Ulises must choose between the benefits and drawbacks of this new lifestyle.

== Cast ==
- Daniel Muñoz as Chavelo
- Alejandro Trejo as Ulises
- Fernando Gómez-Rovira as Coto
- Ivonne Becerra as Almacenera
- Elsa Poblete as Nelly
- Daniel Alcaíno as TV journalist
- Felipe Ortega as Amaro
- Edgardo Carvajal as Ronny
- Denitze Lecaros as Javiera
- Víctor Rojas as Hugo Soto
- Gerardo Orchard as Julián Castro
- Lorena Prada as office secretary
- Cristián Quezada as Inspector Padilla
- René Castro as Inspector Romero
- Marío Escobar as "Bala Fría"
- Iban Ayala as Evangélico
- Juan Rodríguez as Tricycle boy

== See also ==
- List of submissions to the 74th Academy Awards for Best Foreign Language Film
