= 2010 Altazor Awards =

11th Altazor Awards
- Date: 27 April 2010
- Venue: Teatro Teletón
- Country: Chile

Television/radio coverage
- Network: Chilevisión

The eleventh Altazor Awards took place on 27 April 2010, at the Teatro Teletón.

== Nominations ==
=== Literary Arts ===
==== Narrative ====
- Jaime Collyer – La fidelidad presunta de las partes
- Mauricio Electorat – Las Islas que van quedando
- José Miguel Varas – La Huachita

==== Poetry ====
- Pablo Azócar – El placer de los demás
- Efraín Barquero – Pacto de sangre
- Claudio Bertoni – Piden sangre por las puras

==== Essay ====
- José Bengoa – La comunidad fragmentada. Nación y desigualdad en Chile
- Poli Délano – Memorias Neoyorkinas
- Adriana Valdés – Enrique Lihn: vistas parciales

=== Visual Arts ===
==== Painting ====
- Omar Gatica – Yo, pintor
- Matías Pinto D´Aguiar – En la muestra colectiva Homenaje a Pablo Domínguez
- Andrés Vío – Mano de obra

==== Sculpture ====
- Federico Assler – 40 años
- Francisco Gazitúa – Blanco y negro
- Pilar Ovalle – Natura Vincit

==== Engraving and Drawing ====
- Valentina Cruz – Entre líneas y sombras
- Teresa Gazitúa – Tiempo Grabado
- Patricia Israel – Libro Cuerpos Impresos

==== Installation art and Video art ====
- Nury González – Sueño velado, en la muestra colectiva El terremoto de Chile
- Cristóbal Lehyt – El Penúltimo Paisaje
- Alicia Villarreal – Grabar el Territorio, en la muestra colectiva Territorios de Estado: Paisaje y Cartografía de Chile, Siglo XIX

==== Photography ====
- Antonia Cruz – Catalepsia
- Luis Ladrón de Guevara – Desde la fotografía industrial hacia una estética de la producción
- Helen Hughes, Kena Lorenzini and Leonora Vicuña – Visible/invisible

==== Graphic design and Illustration ====
- Alberto Montt – Libro Recetas al pie de la letra
- Jenny Abud, Mauricio Vico and Mario Osses – Libro Un grito en la pared, psicodelia, compromiso político y exilio en el cartel chileno
- Mariana Muñoz and Fernanda Villalobos – Libro Alejandro Fauré, Obra gráfica

=== Performing Arts Theatre ===
==== Dramaturgy ====
- Luis Barrales – La mala clase
- Jaime McManus – El avión rojo
- Creación colectiva de Tryo teatro banda – Pedro de Valdivia: La gesta inconclusa

==== Actor ====
- Miguel Ángel Bravo – Diario de un loco
- Luis Gnecco – Pérez
- Ramón Núñez – Pana

==== Actress ====
- Emilia Noguera – Pana
- Gloria Münchmeyer – Días Contados
- Paula Zúñiga – Diciembre

=== Performing Arts Dance ===
==== Choreography ====
- Isabel Croxatto – Narciso el extasiado
- Oscar Ramírez – Violeta del Alma
- Eduardo Yedro – Un solo para dos

==== Male Dancer ====
- Jorge Carreño – Verdi- Requiem
- César Sepúlveda – Verdi- Requiem
- José Luis Tejo – Arde el piso II

==== Female Dancer ====
- Carola Alvear – Verdi- Requiem
- Carmen Aros – Lo que me dio el agua
- Kana Nakao – Verdi- Requiem

=== Musical Arts ===
==== Classical music ====
- Andrés Ferrari – Optikalis 03
- Alejandro Guarello – Retri
- Aliocha Solovera – Solo para un diálogo

==== Traditional music ====
- Nano Acevedo – Juegos tradicionales chilenos
- Illapu – Vivo
- Daniel Muñoz, Félix Llancafil and 3x7 Veintiuna – Al compás del 6 x 8

==== Pop ====
- Américo – A Morir
- De Kiruza – Música pa´l mundo
- Difuntos Correa – Ilusionismo

==== Rock ====
- Fiskales Ad-Hok – 12
- La Floripondio – 15 Años... ¡¡Sin Niun Brillo!!
- Sinergia – El Imperio de la Estupidez

==== Jazz ====
- Agustín Moya – Infinito
- Felipe Riveros Trío – Santiago
- Sebastián Jordán Quinteto – Afluencia

==== Playing ====
- Leo Ahumada (Guitar)
- Lautaro Quevedo (Piano)
- Freddy Torrealba (Charango)

=== Media Arts Film ===
==== Director Fiction ====
- Alejandro Fernández – Huacho
- Alicia Scherson – Turistas
- Sebastián Silva – La Nana

==== Director Documentary ====
- Samuel León González – Riquelme
- Francisco Hervé – El poder de la palabra
- Juan Ignacio Sabatini – Juan Downey

==== Screenplay ====
- Sebastián Silva and Pedro Peirano – La Nana
- Cristián Jiménez and Alicia Scherson – Ilusiones ópticas
- Alejandro Fernández – Huacho

==== Actor ====
- Luis Dubó – Dawson, Isla 10
- Alejandro Goic – La Nana
- Pablo Krögh – Dawson, Isla 10

==== Actress ====
- Claudia Celedón – La Nana
- Anita Reeves – La Nana
- Catalina Saavedra – La Nana

=== Media Arts TV ===
==== Director Drama ====
- Rodrigo Díaz – Infieles
- María Eugenia Rencoret – ¿Dónde está Elisa?
- Boris Quercia – Los 80

==== Director TV Show ====
- Pablo Lavín – La Travesía de Darwin
- Cristián Leighton – Santiago no es Chile
- Pedro Vergara – TV o no TV

==== Screenplay ====
- Rodrigo Cuevas – Los 80
- Original idea by Pablo Illanes with Nona Fernández, Hugo Morales and Josefina Fernández – ¿Dónde está Elisa?
- Original idea by Rodrigo Ossandón, Felipe Ossandón, Jorge Ayala and Juan Elgueta. Screenplay by Pablo Illanes, Francisca Bernardi, Juan Pablo Olave and Nona Fernández – Conde Vrolok

==== Actor ====
- Francisco Melo – ¿Dónde está Elisa?
- Daniel Muñoz – Los 80
- Álvaro Rudolphy – ¿Dónde está Elisa?

==== Actress ====
- Tamara Acosta – Los 80
- Sigrid Alegría – ¿Dónde está Elisa?
- Paola Volpato – ¿Dónde está Elisa?
