= Claudia Celedón =

Chilean actress

- Born: Claudia Irene Celedón Ureta; 15 August 1966 (age 59); Santiago, Chile
- Occupation: Actress
- Spouse: Cristián García-Huidobro (separated)
- Children: Andrea García-Huidobro
- Parents: Jaime Celedón (father); Bernadette Ureta (mother)
- Awards: Altazor Award (2004)

Claudia Irene Celedón Ureta (born 15 August 1966) is a Chilean television, film, and theater actress. She is the winner of an Altazor Award for best theater actress for her role in the play Mujer gallina, and was awarded at the Cartagena International Film Festival for her role in Old Cats. She is the mother of the actress Andrea García-Huidobro, and ex-wife of Cristián García-Huidobro.

== Biography ==
Claudia Celedón is the daughter of the actor and publicist Jaime Celedón and Bernadette Ureta.

She studied theater at the school of Gustavo Meza. She was part of the cast of the TVN television series El juego de la vida, and the Canal 13 series Las herederas, Matilde dedos verdes, Bravo, and Fuera de control. She also worked on humor programs such as De chincol a jote, Jaguar Yu, and the segment "Los Eguiguren" on Sábados gigantes.

Celedón has participated in the shorts Matar a un boyscout, Amigos, and in the films The Sentimental Teaser and La vida me mata, for which she won a Pedro Sienna Award for Best Actress in 2008, and was nominated for an Altazor.

In theater, she acted in Ser un romántico viajero, Ingenuas Palomas, Cariño Malo, Malinche, Sidhartha, El Seductor, and Madame de Sade, among others. In addition, she has acted and participated in the collective creation of Bareatoa and Hermanos Martínez Internacional.

In 2004 she received the Altazor Award for La Mujer Gallina. That same year she worked on the short film La Perra, on the TVN series Geografía del deseo, and on the play El Taller de los celos. She also played Gabriela Mistral in the biographical project of the poet called La pasajera.

== Filmography ==
=== Film ===
Films
Year	Title	Character	Director	Notes
1999	The Sentimental Teaser	Carmen's Mother	Cristián Galaz	Nominated — Altazor
2002	La Perra		Hugo Maza	
2007	Life Kills Me	Susana	Sebastián Silva	Winner: Pedro Sienna Award; Nominated: Altazor
2009	The Maid	Pilar	Sebastián Silva	Nominated: Altazor
2010	Old Cats	Rosario	Sebastián Silva	Winner: Cartagena Film Festival; Winner Pedro Sienna Award
2010	Fuck My Life	Patricia O'Ryan	Nicolás López	
2011	Qué pena tu boda	Patricia O'Ryan	Nicolás López	
2012	Qué pena tu familia	Patricia O'Ryan	Nicolás López	
2012	La pasión de Michelangelo		Esteban Larraín	
2014	Mejor estar solo	María Jesús	Rodrigo González	
2014	Maldito amor	Luisa	Gonzalo Badilla	
2016	Rara	Ximena	Pepa San Martín	

=== Television ===
TV series
Year	Title	Character	Notes
1983	El juego de la vida		Telenovela, supporting role
1988	Matilde dedos verdes	Paula	Telenovela
1989	Bravo	Nina	Telenovela
1992	Jaguar Yu	Various	Comedy, humor, different roles
1999	Fuera de control	Agatha Rodríguez	Telenovela, starring role
2004	Geografía del deseo	Francisca	Series, lead role
2005	EsCool	Sara Frezar / Katya Frezar	Series, co-star
2005	Casados	Pilar	Series (Season 1, Episode 1)
2012	Solita camino	Mariana Aguirre	Series, Co-star
2013	Dudo		Guest
2015	El bosque de Karadima	Paola	
2017	12 días que estremecieron Chile	Soledad	Chapter: La Muerte de Pinochet

== Awards ==
- 2004 Altazor Awards: Best Theater Actress (Mujer gallina)
- 2008 Pedro Sienna Award: Best Supporting Actress (La vida me mata)
- 2011 Cartagena International Film Festival: Best Actress (Old Cats)
- 2012 Pedro Sienna Award: Best Supporting Actress (Old Cats)

=== Nominations ===
- 2000 Altazor Awards: Best Film Actress (The Sentimental Teaser)
- 2005 Altazor Awards: Best Theater Actress (El taller de los celos)
- 2008 Altazor Awards: Best Film Actress (La vida me mata)
- 2010 Altazor Awards: Best Actress (The Maid)
