= Radio Corazón =

- Film poster
- Directed by: Roberto Artiagoitía
- Written by: Roberto Artiagoitia; Pablo Illanes
- Produced by: Pueblo Cine
- Cinematography: Antonio Quercia
- Music by: Carlos Cabezas
- Release date: 4 October 2007
- Running time: 107 minutes
- Country: Chile
- Language: Spanish

Radio Corazón is a 2007 Chilean comedy-drama film directed by and starring Roberto Artiagoitía (nicknamed El Rumpy). It portrays three stories based on phone calls made to El Rumpy's radio program in Chile, El chacotero sentimental. It was the highest-grossing film for the week in Chile upon its release on October 4, 2007. The film is a sequel to the 1999 film El Chacotero Sentimental: La película.

The stars of the film include Daniel Muñoz, Manuela Martelli, and Daniel Alcaíno.

== Plot ==
The popular radio show "The Sentimental Jester" is hosted by El Rumpy, where three individuals call in to share their stories or seek help.

The first caller is a high school senior (Manuela Martelli), who is the only one among her friends who hasn't engaged in sexual relations. She seeks help from her stepfather.

The second caller is a mother (Claudia Di Girólamo) who lives with her daughter-in-law. Suddenly, she finds herself attracted to her daughter-in-law shortly after her son's marriage.

The third caller is a nanny (Tamara Acosta) who works in a mansion as a caregiver for the children. However, the mansion's owner has a terminal illness, and the nanny must take some measures before her death.

== Cast ==
- Daniel Muñoz - Manolo Tapia
- Manuela Martelli - Nice Riquelme
- Daniel Alcaíno - Darwin Soto
- Claudia Di Girolamo - Sandra
- Néstor Cantillana - Federico Ossandón
- Juana Viale - Manuela
- Tamara Acosta - Valeria
- Amparo Noguera - María Pilar Bauzá
- Felipe Braun - Cristián Covarrubias
- Peggy Cordero - Doña Amanda
- Bastián Bodenhöfer - Jorge Covarrubias
- Roxana Campos - Teresa
- Katyna Huberman - Sofía
- María Paz Grandjean - Scarlette
- Constanza Jacob - Daniella
- Diego Ruiz - Víctor
- Álvaro Salas - himself
- Isidora Cabezón - Karen
- María Angélica Díaz - Nilda
