= Pablo Herrera =

Pablo Herrera may refer to:

- Pablo Herrera (politician) (1820–1896), Vice President of Ecuador
- Pablo Herrera (songwriter) (born 1963), Chilean singer and songwriter
- Pablo Herrera (beach volleyball) (born 1982), Olympic silver medalist
- Pablo Herrera (footballer) (born 1987), Costa Rican footballer
- Pablo Herrera (musician), Cuban rap music producer
- Pablo Herrera, a leader of Las Gorras Blancas (1880s−1890s) in the New Mexico Territory
