= List of 2007 box office number-one films in Chile =

This is a list of films which have placed number one at the weekend box office in Chile during 2007.

== Films ==
Radio Corazón became the highest grossing film of 2007, despite not reaching #1 during the year.

#	Date	Film	Gross	Notes
1	January 10, 2007	Eragon	$384,768	
2	January 17, 2007	Eragon	$204,311	
3	January 24, 2007	Night at the Museum	$506,196	
4	January 31, 2007	Night at the Museum	$344,687	
5	February 7, 2007	Night at the Museum	$282,232	
6	February 14, 2007	Night at the Museum	$194,448	
7	February 21, 2007	Night at the Museum	$167,773	
8	February 25, 2007	Night at the Museum	$124,871	
9	March 7, 2007	Night at the Museum	$87,970	
10	March 14, 2007	Apocalypto	$100,267	
11	March 21, 2007	Apocalypto	$71,037	
12	March 28, 2007	Apocalypto	$59,570	
13	April 4, 2007	300	$612,191	
14	April 11, 2007	300	$349,847	
15	April 18, 2007	300	$179,640	
18	May 6, 2007	Spider-Man 3	$1,147,009	
19	May 13, 2007	Spider-Man 3	$518,537	
21	May 27, 2007	Pirates of the Caribbean: At World's End	$952,349	
22	June 3, 2007	Pirates of the Caribbean: At World's End	$536,012	
23	June 10, 2007	Pirates of the Caribbean: At World's End	$350,994	
24	June 17, 2007	Shrek the Third	$793,432	
25	June 24, 2007	Shrek the Third	$491,600	
26	July 1, 2007	Ratatouille	$382,754	
27	July 8, 2007	Ratatouille	$248,702	
28	July 15, 2007	Harry Potter and the Order of the Phoenix	$843,898	
29	July 22, 2007	Transformers	$788,905	
30	July 29, 2007	The Simpsons Movie	$1,311,933	
31	August 5, 2007	The Simpsons Movie	$694,218	
32	August 12, 2007	The Simpsons Movie	$254,171	
33	August 19, 2007	Live Free or Die Hard	$146,452	
34	August 26, 2007	Live Free or Die Hard	$84,701	
35	September 2, 2007	The Simpsons Movie	$64,738	
36	September 9, 2007	La Remolienda	$40,992	
38	September 23, 2007	La Remolienda	$49,091	
39	September 30, 2007	Evan Almighty	$97,808	
40	October 7, 2007	Radio Corazón	$529,928	
42	October 21, 2007	Radio Corazón	$136,131	
43	October 28, 2007	Underdog	$90,042	
44	November 4, 2007	Underdog	$132,297	
45	November 11, 2007	Underdog	$50,384	
46	November 18, 2007	Che Kopete: La Película	$241,985	
47	November 25, 2007	Beowulf	$151,569	
48	December 2, 2007	Beowulf	$104,305	
49	December 9, 2007	Bee Movie	$160,882	
50	December 16, 2007	The Golden Compass	$155,422	
51	December 23, 2007	Enchanted	$93,908	
52	December 30, 2007	National Treasure: Book of Secrets	$163,932	

== See also ==
- List of Chilean films
