= Sígsig =

Town in Azuay Province, Ecuador

- San Sebastian de Sígsig
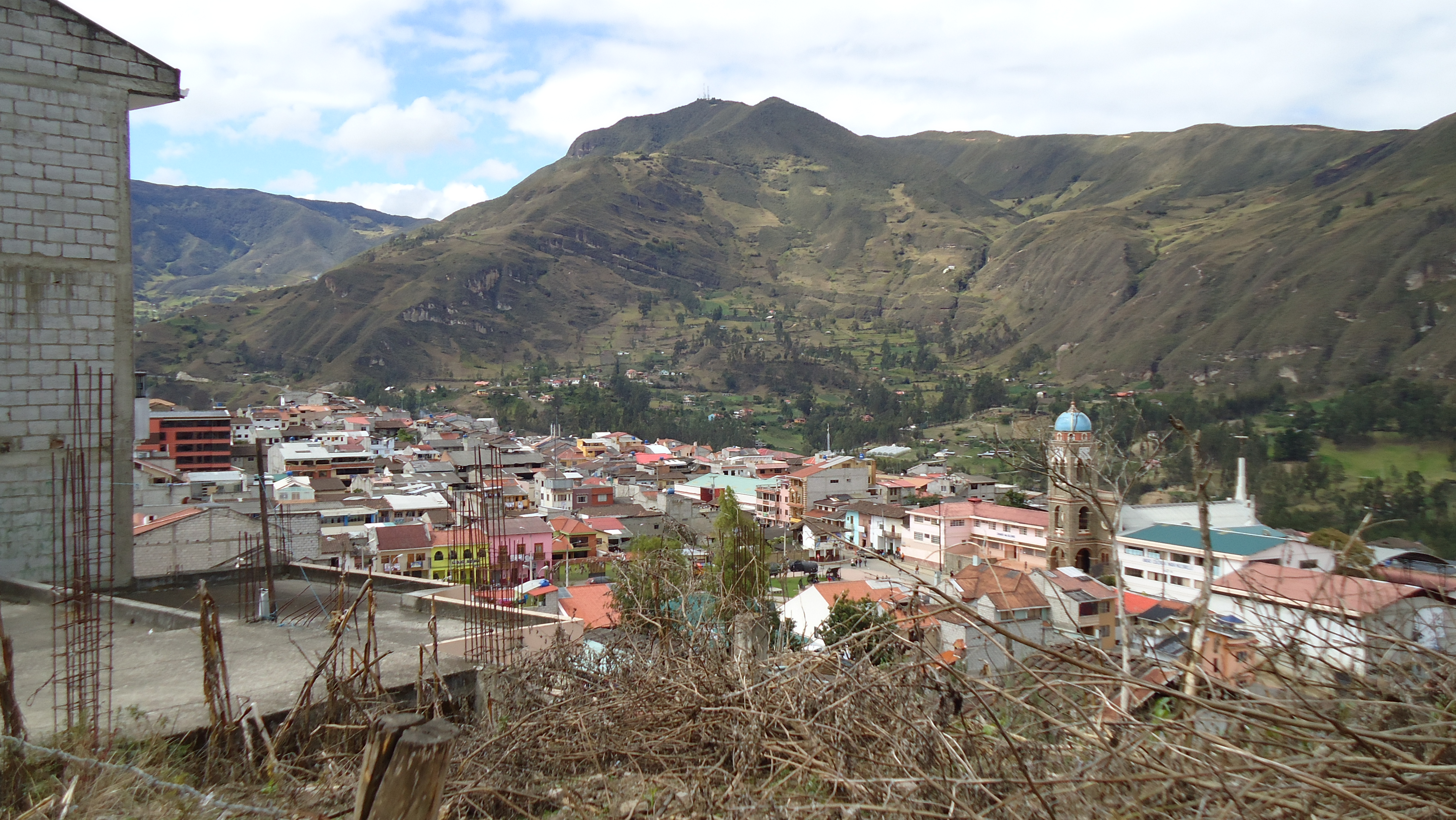

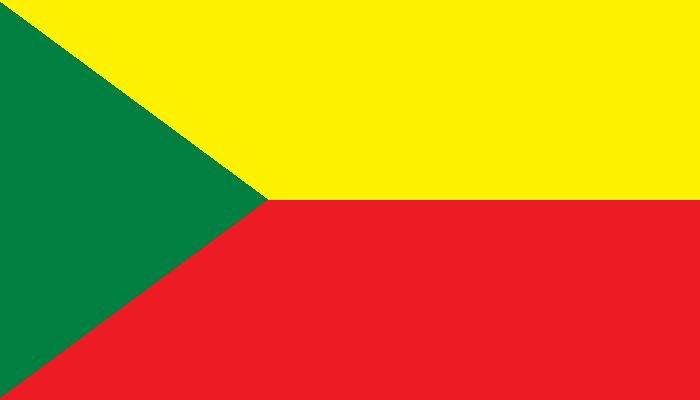
- Flag
- Nickname: La Cuna de la Paja Toquilla (The Cradle of Toquilla Straw)
- Location within Ecuador
- Coordinates: 3°3′3.1″S 78°47′43.4″W
- Country: Ecuador
- Province: Azuay
- Canton: Sigsig
- Established: June 16, 1552
- Named for: Síksik

Government
  - Mayor: Holger Duchitanga Morocho

Area
  - Total: 2.017 km^{2} (0.7788 sq mi)

Population (2022 census)
  - Total: 4,029
  - Density: 1,997/km^{2} (5,173/sq mi)
- Time zone: ECT
- Website: www.sigsig.gob.ec

Sígsig, officially San Sebastian de Sígsig is a town that is located in Azuay Province, Ecuador. It is the seat of the Sígsig Canton and the parish itself. Sígsig is home to the biggest Panama Hat in the canton, and known for its festivals, and parades. Its population is 4,029 (2022 census), and its population density is 1,997/km2 (5,173/sq mi).

== History ==
=== Pre-Columbian era ===
Sígsig was originally inhabited by the Cañari people, known for their advanced agricultural and societal systems. Following the Inca conquest, the region became integrated into the Inca Empire.

=== Establishment ===
The Spanish founded the town on June 16, 1552, during the Spanish colonization efforts.

=== Cantonization ===
In 1944, Sígsig was officially established as a canton, marking its importance as an administrative center.

== Economy ==
Sígsig has a diverse economy primarily driven by agriculture. The town is known for its production of crops such as maize, potatoes, and beans. Additionally, Sígsig is notable for its traditional craftsmanship, particularly the weaving of high-quality Panama Hats. The town's economy benefits from its cultural heritage and the export of these hats, which are an important source of income for many local families.
