= Los 80 =

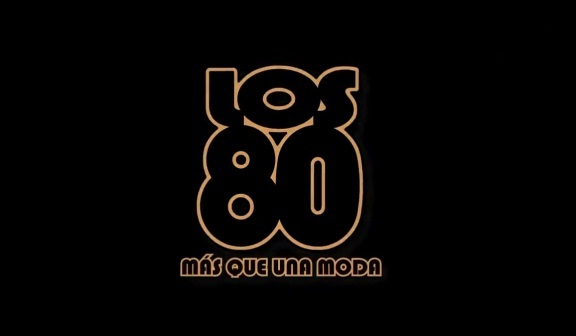
- Los 80 intertitle
- Created by: Boris Quercia
- Starring: Daniel Muñoz; Tamara Acosta; Daniel Alcaíno; Loreto Aravena; Tomás Verdejo; Lucas Bolvarán; Katty Kowaleczko
- Opening theme: "El Tiempo en las Bastillas"
- Country of origin: Chile
- Original language: Spanish
- No. of seasons: 7
- No. of episodes: 78

Production
- Executive producers: Alberto Gesswein; Patricio Pereira
- Production locations: Santiago, Chile
- Running time: 54 minutes

Original release
- Network: Canal 13
- Release: 12 October 2008 – 21 December 2014

Los 80 is a Chilean drama TV series for Canal 13 produced to celebrate the Bicentennial of Chile, starring Daniel Muñoz, Tamara Acosta, Daniel Alcaíno, Loreto Aravena, Tomás Verdejo and Lucas Escobar. Although it is clearly inspired by the Spanish series Cuéntame cómo pasó, focusing on the events in Chile, it is not an official remake. The series was renewed for a seventh and last season that aired in Spring-Summer 2014.

== Plot ==
The series, starring Daniel Muñoz and Tamara Acosta, tells the story of the Herreras, a middle-class family living in Santiago of Chile. The plot is set between 1982 and 1989, in the military dictatorship, and revolves around historical events during the 1980s, especially the economic crisis of 1982 and the 8.0 magnitude earthquake in Santiago.

== Cast and characters ==
=== Main cast ===
- Daniel Muñoz as Juan Herrera
- Tamara Acosta as Ana Lopez Matamala
- Loreto Aravena as Claudia Herrera Lopez
- Tomás Verdejo as Martin Herrera Lopez
- Lucas Bolvarán as Felix Herrera Lopez
- Estrella Ortiz as Anita Herrera
- Daniel Alcaíno as Exequiel Pacheco
- Katty Kowałeczko as Nancy Mora
- Pablo Freire as Bruno Mora
- Fernando Farías as Don Genaro
- Diego Navarrete as Petita

=== Recurring cast ===
- Carmen Disa Gutiérrez as Luz Matamala (Season 1-7): mother of Ana.
- Mario Horton as Gabriel Diaz (recurring in seasons 2 and 3; main in season 4): a medical student secretly a member of the FPMR, later becomes Claudia's boyfriend.
- Emilia Lara as Paola (recurring in seasons 3 and 6; main in seasons 4-5): a young punk artist who becomes Martin's girlfriend and the mother of their first child, Vicente.
- Nestor Cantillana as Mateo González (recurring in season 6; main in season 7): a math teacher who becomes a colleague, friend, and later Ana's boyfriend.
- Constanza Rojas as Sybilla (recurring in seasons 5 and 7; main in season 6): a young exile returned from Sweden who becomes Felix's girlfriend.
- Nelson Brodt as Pedro Herrera (Season 1 and 3): Juan's father.
- Ivan Alvarez de Araya as Luciano Acuña (Season 6-7): a renowned doctor who becomes Claudia's boyfriend and later husband.
- Benito Quercia as Farid Metuaze (Season 1-5): Juan's boss and later business partner and friend.
- Gonzalo Robles as Ricardo Metuaze (Season 5 and 7): a shady businessman and Don Farid's son.
- Otilio Castro as Pedro Herrera Escobedo / Tapia (Season 4-5): an agent of the CNI who infiltrates the Herrera family as a supposed brother of Juan.
- Jorge Yañez (Season 1) and Patricio Andrade (Season 3) as Ramiro López: Ana's father.
- Nathalia Aragonese as Gloria (Season 6-7): Exequiel's ex-lover and the mother of his first biological child.
- Amaya Forch as Alejandra Hurtado (Season 7): a practitioner of natural medicine who becomes Juan's girlfriend.
- Diego Casanueva as Gonzalo "Gonza" (Season 3-7): an audiovisual communicator and friend of Paola and Martin.
- María Ester Mesina as Señora Marta (Season 3-7): a household advisor who works for the Herrera family; she previously worked for Nancy and Bruno.
- Berta Lasala as Mónica Miranda (Season 3): a photographer and friend of Juan.
- María José Bello as Sandra González (Season 2, 3, and 5): a medical student and Claudia's friend.
- Max Corvalán as Padre Renato (Season 1-7): Félix and Bruno's homeroom teacher.
- Catherine Mazoyer as Gloria Del Río (Season 3-7): Ana and Nancy's boss.
- Verónica Soffia as Macarena Tagle (Season 2, 3, and 6): the daughter of an officer in the FACH and Martin's love interest, who, in defending her, received a beating that made him unfit to be a pilot.
- Nicolás Saavedra as Nestor Diaz (Season 5): a primary school teacher and Gabriel's cousin.
- Gabriela Medina as Doña Imelda (Season 1-7): a neighbour of the Herrera family.
- Erto Pantoja as Soto (Season 6): a troublesome colleague of Juan and a friend of Riquelme.
- Francisco Rodríguez as Francisco Silva (Season 1-2): a medical student, student leader, and Claudia's boyfriend.
- Karina Santoro as Camila von Hummel (Season 4-5): a new young neighbour in the neighbourhood and Felix's love interest.
- Antonia Zilleruelo as Paulina von Hummel (Season 4-5): Camila's sister and later Bruno's girlfriend.
- Lux Balmaceda Pascal as Axel / Felipe Müller (Season 7): a troubled young man who becomes Felix's friend.
- Sergio Piña as Don Roberto Cifuentes (Season 6): a businessman and Juan, Soto, and Riquelme's boss.
- Luis Uribe as Juan's Lawyer (Season 6-7).
- Víctor Rojas as Father Enrique (Season 1 and 5): Martín's homeroom teacher and teacher of some of Felix's subjects.
- Mauricio Pitta as CNI Agent (Season 3-4).
- Francisco González as CNI Agent (Season 3-4).
- Claudia Cabezas as Laura, Ana, and Nancy's Colleague (Season 6).
- Raimundo Guzmán as Diego Rojas (Season 1-2): Martín's classmate and friend.
- Irene Medina as Pauli (Season 2-3): a medical student and Claudia's friend.
- Benjamín Velásquez as Nelson (Season 1-7): a classmate and friend of Felix, Bruno, and Pereira.
- Carlos Belmar as Pereira (Season 4-7): a classmate and friend of Nelson, Felix, and Bruno.
- Paulo Meza as Riquelme (Season 6-7): one of Juan's colleagues.
- Jaime Artus as Cristián Plaza (Season 2): a classmate at the Aviation School and Martín's friend.
- Francisca Castillo as Teresa, Camila, and Paulina's Mother (Season 4-5).
- Juan Pablo Larenas as Cristobal (Season 5-6): the camera assistant and Martin's colleague at Teleanálisis.
- Luna Martínez as Susy (Season 7): Axel's friend.
- Rocío Toscano as Ximena (Season 7): Axel and Félix's friend.
- Javier Castillo as Daniel, Camila's boyfriend (Season 4-5).

=== Guests ===
- Natalie Dujovne as Susana (Season 1): a student who becomes Martin's first love interest.
- Cristóbal Aldea as Denin Gallardo (Season 1): a young neighbourhood hardware store owner and Claudia's first boyfriend.
- Alejandro Goic as Mario (Season 1).
- Belen Soto as Gracia (Season 1).
- Pablo Schwarz as Sergeant Morales (Season 1).
- Luz Jiménez as Mrs. Mora, a relative of a detainee (Season 1).
- Lucy Cominetti as Catalina (Season 1), Claudia's university classmate.
- Ramón Llao as Manuel (Season 2): owner of the pool hall frequented by "El Chino," "La Negra," and Martin.
- Ernesto Anacona as "El Chino" (Season 2): a motorcyclist friend of Martin.
- Mireya Moreno as Gabriel's Grandmother (Season 2).
- Catalina Martin as Pamela "La Negra" (Season 2 and 6): Chino's girlfriend, later becoming a salsa teacher.
- Franco Meershon as Mauricio (Season 3): a medical student and Claudia's boyfriend.
- Manuel Peña as Roberto Fuenzalida (Season 3): Bruno's biological father.
- Álvaro Viguera as Fernando Tapia (Season 3): a doctor, friend, and FPMR colleague of Gabriel.
- Federica Larraín as Paty (Season 3): Félix and Bruno's classmate.
- Heidrun Breier as Mother Teresa (Season 3): Félix and Bruno's teacher.
- Gloria Münchmeyer as Leonora (Season 3), Pedro's friend.
- Gregory Cohen as Óscar Contardo (Season 4): an FPMR collaborating doctor who shelters Claudia after her clandestine return to Chile.
- Cristóbal Muhr as "El Rucio" (Season 4): Gabriel's companion and friend in the FPMR.
- Carolina Paulsen as Secretary of the Vicariate of Solidarity (Season 4).
- Patricia Pardo as Enriqueta Amunátegui, Paola's mother (Season 4).
- Peggy Cordero as Rebeca de Assad (Season 5), wife and later widow of Don Farid.
- Norma Ortiz as Alicia (Season 5), Néstor and Gabriel's grandmother.
- Gustavo Becerra as Lucho (Season 5): a construction worker in charge of expanding the Herrera family's house.
- Edinson Díaz as Miguel (Season 5): a construction worker in charge of expanding the Herrera family's house.
- Gloria Laso as Ricardo's Ex-Wife (Season 5).
- Marcela Arroyave as Ricardo's Lover (Season 5).
- Jorge Gajardo as Juan's Friend (Season 5).
- Rodrigo Pérez as Jorge, former DINA agent (Season 6).
- Carolina Arredondo as Erika Rojas (Season 6).
- Grimanesa Jiménez as Mother Superior of Anita's school (Season 7).
- Bastián Bodenhöfer as Enrique (Season 7).
- Edgardo Bruna as Arturo González (Season 7).
- Alejandro Trejo as Milton (Season 7): a newly arrived barber in the neighbourhood who becomes friends with Petita.
- Sebastián Arrigorriaga as Félix 2014 (Season 7): an adult version of Félix in the year 2014.
- Daniela Ramírez as Sybilla 2014 (Season 7): an adult version of Sybilla in the year 2014.
- Daniela Castillo as Anita Silva (2014) (Season 7).

== Development ==
The first season of the series premiered on 12 October 2008. In this first season, the story is set between 1982 and 1983, starting with Chile's qualification for the 1982 FIFA World Cup, thanks to soccer player Carlos Caszely, and finishing with the first national protest against Augusto Pinochet.

The second season premiered on 18 October 2009. This time, the story is set between 1983 and 1984, starting with a moment that changes the life of the Herrera family, the news of a new baby, and finishing with the birth of baby Ana.

The third season of the series premiered on 17 October 2010 and ended on 19 December. Set in 1985, it starts with the 1985 Algarrobo earthquake and ends with Claudia's decision to leave her family, because she's being investigated by the CNI.

The fourth season of the series premiered on 16 October 2011. Set in 1986, it starts with the Herreras reading the goodbye letter Claudia left and Juan going to Argentina to see her. The season finished on 20 December 2011 with Pedro (CNI agent) torturing Claudia, Gabriel (Claudia's boyfriend) being shot and killed by CNI agents, and Claudia finally returning to her home and hugging her mother.

The fifth season of the series premiered on 23 September 2012. The year is 1987, and it starts with Pope John Paul II's visit to Chile. The fifth season ended on 16 December 2012 with Juan trying to get a job after Ricardo, the son of his former employer, steals all the money Juan and him made from selling a textile factory. Claudia, recovering from Gabriel's death, tries to go back to medical school, repeating again the PAA (Chilean MCAT). In the meantime, Felix has his first kiss with Sibila.

The sixth season premiered on 13 October 2013. It focuses on 1988's plebiscite of 1988 and the end of Pinochet's dictatorship. The season's finale took place on 12 January 2014.

Finally, in August 2014, Canal 13 announced the seventh season of the series, based on the year 1989, which began to be issued from 5 October and will mark the end of the series. The recordings were completed on Tuesday 18 November 2014, amid tears and hugs.

== Chilean television ratings ==
The pilot episode attracted 2.06 million viewers in Chile, came first in its time slot, leaving behind other programs like Animal Nocturno in the "competitive Sunday night". The season marked a peak audience of 2.7 million and an average rating, in 10 episodes, of 1.9 million viewers. Los 80 was the most watched new series in 2008, averaging a total of 1.92 million viewers.

For the second season, the show continued in the "competitive Sunday night", against Animal Nocturno from TVN and Caiga Quien Caiga from Megavisión, leading the night with a positive margin of 0.7 million viewers. The series popularity increased, and it started having a big cultural impact in people. The season's audience average was 2.54 million viewers. The season had an average rating of 2.54 million viewers. The most watched episode of the season was the season's finale "Nos queremos tanto".

For the third season, the series still led the Sunday nights and became the most watched show of the year, with 2.67 million viewers, winning awards like TV Grama Award and the Copihue de Oro. The season finale attracted 3.2 million viewers. The season's most watched episode was "Familia", the season finale, with an average of 3.25 million viewers and a peak audience of 4.3 million viewers. This season transformed Los 80 in the most watched TV show in Chile.

The fourth season increased the popularity of the series even more. This was the most watched season of the series and the most watched show of the year again, averaging a total of 2.98 million viewers, winning more awards like APES Award, Copihue de Oro and TV Grama again. The season's finale "Cuando solo nos queda rezar" had an average of 3.4 million viewers, with a peak audience of 4.4 million viewers. The season's most watched episode was "Madres coraje", which had an average of 3.46 million viewers, making it also the most watched episode of the whole series. This season had an average of 2.98 million viewers, and it was both the most watched season of the series and the most watched TV show in 2011.

For the fifth season, a new time slot led to a decline in the show's popularity and to a decrease in viewers, but the show continued leading the Sunday nights. The season's premiere attracted 2.96 million viewers, and was the lead-out to Pareja Perfecta, which attracted 2.51 million viewers that night. The season's finale attracted 2.61 million viewers, and the season's average was 2.58 million viewers, with a total of 12 episodes. The season's finale "El día más feliz de mi vida" ("The happiest day of my life") had an average of 2.61 million viewers and a peak audience of 3.4 million viewers. The season most watched episode was "Y nada más", which had an average of 3.07 million viewers. The season had an average of 2.58 million viewers.

Season	Episodes	Timeslot	Season premiere	Season finale	TV season	Viewers (millions)
Los 80 (season 1)	10	Sunday 10:30 pm	12 October 2008	21 December 2008	2008	1.92
Los 80 (season 2)	10	Sunday 10:30 pm	18 October 2009	27 December 2009	2009	2.54
Los 80 (season 3)	10	Sunday 10:30 pm	17 October 2010	19 December 2010	2010	2.67
Los 80 (season 4)	11	Sunday 10:30 pm	16 October 2011	20 December 2011	2011	2.98
Los 80 (season 5)	12	Sunday 10 pm	23 September 2012	16 December 2012	2012	2.58
Los 80 (season 6)	12	Sunday 10 pm	13 October 2013	12 January 2014	2013	2.28
Los 80 (season 7)	13	Sunday 10 pm	5 October 2014	21 December 2014	2014	TBA
