= José Soza =

Chilean actor

José Miguel Soza Hernández
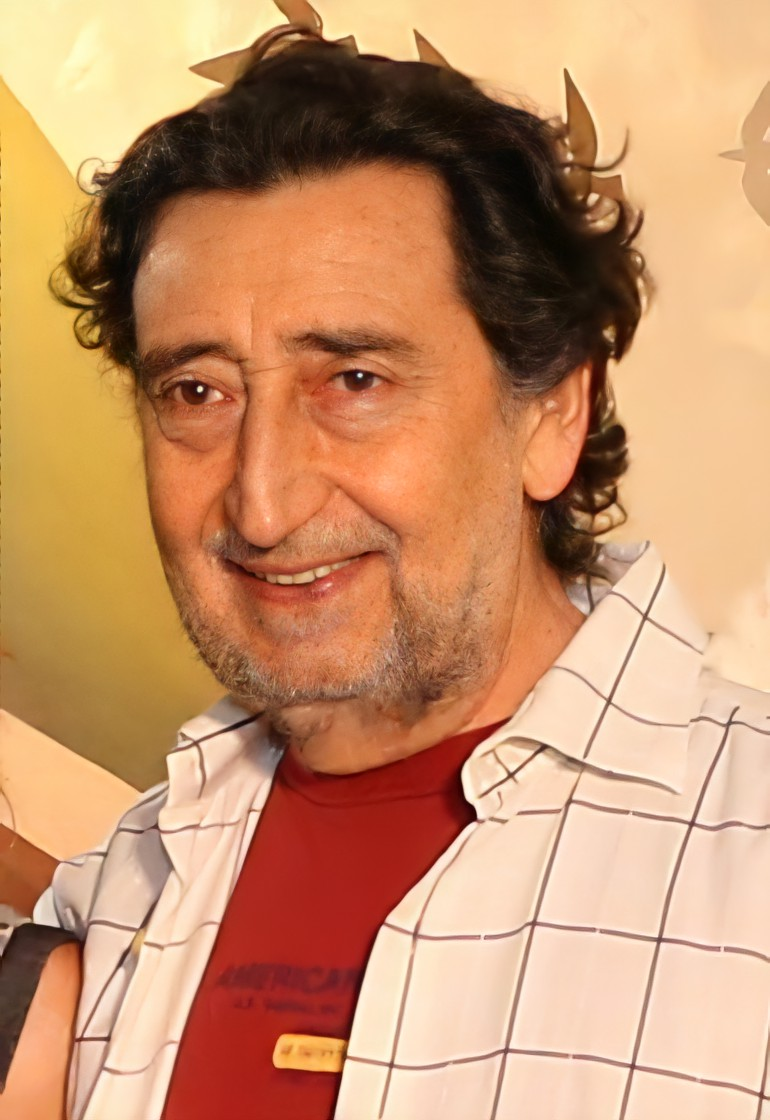
- Soza in 2020
- Born: June 26, 1946 (age 79); Teno, Chile
- Occupation: Actor
- Years active: 1969–present

José Miguel Soza Hernández (born June 26, 1946, in Teno) is a Chilean award-winning theater, film and television actor. He has also worked as a theater director, dubbing actor and broadcaster. He belonged to the cast of the golden age of the television series by director Vicente Sabatini between 1995 and 2005.

== Filmography ==
=== Films ===
Film
| Year | Film | Character | Director |
|---|---|---|---|
| 1973 | La maldición de la palabra | Aliro | Él mismo |
| 1986 | Hechos consumados | Miguel | Luis R. Vera |
| 1987 | La estación del regreso | Abogado | Leo Kocking |
| 1989 | Historias de lagartos | | Juan Carlos Bustamante |
| 1990 | Amelia Lopes O'Neill | | Valeria Sarmiento |
| 1991 | Joe de Memphis | | |
| 1992 | Ciénaga | | |
| 1995 | La rubia de Kennedy | El brujo | Arnaldo Valsecchi |
| 1998 | El hombre que imaginaba | Heladero | Claudio Sapiaín |
| 2000 | Chilean Gothic | | Ricardo Harrington |
| 2000 | El vecino | Jofré | Juan Carlos Bustamante |
| 2006 | El rey de San Gregorio | Chofer colectivo | Alfonso Gazitúa |
| 2006 | Fuga | Carlitos | Pablo Larraín |
| 2011 | Los 33 de Atacama | Minero sabio | Antonio Recio |
| 2011 | La Jubilada | Rogelio Neira | Jairo Boisier |
| 2014 | Joselito | Camilo | Bárbara Pestán |
| 2015 | El Club | Padre Matías Lazcano | Pablo Larraín |
| 2016 | Neruda | Senador de la República | Pablo Larraín |
| 2019 | Fiebre Austral | | Thomas Woodroffe |
| 2019 | El hombre del futuro | Michelsen | Felipe Ríos |
| 2024 | Isla Negra | Miguel | Jorge Riquelme Serrano |
| 2024 | The Wild Years | | Andrés Nazarala |

=== Telenovelas ===
Telenovela
| Year | Film | Character | Director | Channel |
|---|---|---|---|---|
| 1981 | Villa Los Aromos | Víctor de la Fuente | Claudio Guzmán | TVN |
| 1983 | El juego de la vida | | Herval Rossano | TVN |
| 1984 | La represa | Avelino Leiva | Ricardo Vicuña | TVN |
| 1984 | La torre 10 | Fanor Arancibia | Vicente Sabatini | TVN |
| 1985 | El prisionero de la medianoche | Vicente de la Cruz | Cristián Mason | Canal 13 |
| 1986 | La dama del balcón | Luis "Lucho" Rey | Ricardo Vicuña | TVN |
| 1986 | La Villa | Segundo "El Chueco" Ledesma | Ricardo Vicuña | TVN |
| 1987 | La invitación | Abel Bravo | Óscar Rodríguez | Canal 13 |
| 1988 | Vivir así | Padre Álvaro | Vicente Sabatini | Canal 13 |
| 1989 | A la sombra del ángel | Esteban Dupré | René Schneider Arce | TVN |
| 1992 | Trampas y caretas | Bernardo Noimann | Vicente Sabatini | TVN |
| 1993 | Jaque mate | Jacobo Kuschbaum | Vicente Sabatini | TVN |
| 1994 | Rompecorazón | Leonel Garay | Vicente Sabatini | TVN |
| 1995 | Estúpido Cupido | Waldo Retamales | Vicente Sabatini | TVN |
| 1996 | Sucupira | Segundo Fábrega | Vicente Sabatini | TVN |
| 1997 | Oro verde | Humberto Durán | Vicente Sabatini | TVN |
| 1998 | Iorana | Rodolfo Tuki "El Pájaro Tuki" | Vicente Sabatini | TVN |
| 1999 | La Fiera | Jorge Cereceda "El Cereza" | Vicente Sabatini | TVN |
| 2000 | Romané | Drago Stanovich | Vicente Sabatini | TVN |
| 2001 | Pampa Ilusión | Ivo Yutrovic "El ciego romana" | Vicente Sabatini | TVN |
| 2002 | El circo de las Montini | Lindorfo Mondaca "El payaso Ay! Ay! Ay!" | Vicente Sabatini | TVN |
| 2003 | Puertas adentro | Humberto Cubillos | Vicente Sabatini | TVN |
| 2004 | Los Pincheira | Olegario Sotomayor | Vicente Sabatini | TVN |
| 2005 | Los Capo | Rutilio Campanelli | Vicente Sabatini | TVN |
| 2006 | Cómplices | Alberto Morán | Vicente Sabatini | TVN |
| 2007 | Corazón de María | Nicomedes Chandía | Vicente Sabatini | TVN |
| 2008 | Viuda Alegre | Cóndor Dionisio Vivanco | Vicente Sabatini | TVN |
| 2009 | Los exitosos Pells | Ricardo Catalano | Germán Barriga | TVN |
| 2010 | Manuel Rodríguez | Obispo José Santiago Rodríguez Zorrilla | Vicente Sabatini | Chilevisión |
| 2011 | La Doña | Gonzalo de los Ríos y Encio | Vicente Sabatini | Chilevisión |
| 2011 | Peleles | Jorge Retamales | León Errázuriz | Canal 13 |
| 2013 | Soltera otra vez | Aliro Moreno | Herval Abreu | Canal 13 |
| 2019 | Amor a la Catalán | Basilio "Basi" Mardones | Vicente Sabatini | Canal 13 |
