= The Wild Years =

- Theatrical release poster
- Directed by: Andrés Nazarala
- Written by: Andrés Nazarala; Paula Boente
- Produced by: Florencia Rodríguez
- Starring: Daniel Antivilo
- Cinematography: Paula Ramírez
- Edited by: Darío Órdenes Duarte
- Music by: Sebastian Orellana Guzmán
- Production company: Oro Films
- Distributed by: Storyboard Media Distribución
- Release dates: October 18, 2024 (FICV); April 10, 2025 (Chile)
- Running time: 106 minutes
- Country: Chile
- Language: Spanish

The Wild Years (Spanish: Los años salvajes) is a 2024 Chilean comedy-drama film co-written and directed by Andrés Nazarala. Starring Daniel Antivilo accompanied by José Soza, Nathalia Galgani, Daniel Muñoz and Alejandro Goic.

== Synopsis ==
Forgotten rocker Ricky Palace finds himself in financial straits when he closes the bar where he plays to survive in Valparaíso. At the same time, he is mistakenly declared dead in a local newspaper. In an act of vindication, he decides to reclaim the rights to the hit song he stole from his rival Tommy Wolf—now a star abroad. Ricky faces a crossroads: create a new life for himself or survive as a ghost in the ruins of bohemian life.

== Cast ==
- Daniel Antivilo as Ricky Palace
- Alejandro Goic as Tommy Wolf
- José Soza
- Nathalia Galgani
- Daniel Muñoz

== Production ==
Principal photography wrapped in mid-August 2022 in Valparaíso and Viña del Mar.

== Release ==
The Wild Years had its world premiere on October 18, 2024, at the 31st Valdivia International Film Festival, then screened on November 28, 2024, at the 36th Viña del Mar International Film Festival, on January 16, 2025, at the 6th Ñuble National Film Festival, on January 24, 2025, at the 17th Chilean Film Festival, and on April 2, 2025, at the 26th Buenos Aires International Festival of Independent Cinema.

The film was commercially released on April 10, 2025, in Chilean theaters.

== Accolades ==
Year	Award / Festival	Category	Recipient	Result	Ref.
2024	31st Valdivia International Film Festival	Best Film	The Wild Years	Nominated	
2025	6th Ñuble National Film Festival	Best Film	The Wild Years	Nominated	
2025	6th Ñuble National Film Festival	Special Mention for Outstanding Leading Performance	Daniel Antivilo	Won	
2025	40th Guadalajara International Film Festival	Best Ibero-American Fiction Feature Film	The Wild Years	Nominated	
