= Piedad Moscoso =

Ecuadorian teacher, physician and feminist activist

- Born: María Piedad Moscoso Serrano; 1932; Sígsig Canton, Ecuador
- Died: November 13, 2010 (aged 77–78); Cuenca, Ecuador
- Resting place: Heritage Cemetery
- Education: University of Cuenca
- Occupations: Educator, physician
- Awards: Matilde Hidalgo de Procel Award (2014)

María Piedad Moscoso Serrano (1932 – November 13, 2010) was an Ecuadorian teacher, physician, and feminist activist. She is remembered as a pioneer in the struggle for women's rights in Azuay Province.

== Biography ==
Piedad Moscoso was born in Sígsig, Azuay Province in 1932. She completed her higher education at the University of Cuenca's Faculty of Medicine, where she graduated in 1956 as the first woman to obtain the title of doctor from that institution.

In her youth she was associated with left-wing personalities of the time, putting up Che Guevara at her house during his passage through Ecuador to Mexico, and becoming close to communist Nela Martínez and Manuel Agustín Aguirre, among others. Eventually she would define herself as an anarchist.

She worked as a teacher in several schools in Azuay, including Manuela Garaicoa, Manuel J. Calle, and Camverino Javeriano.

During her life she was involved with social struggles for the rights of workers, against the military dictatorships and the social repression of the León Febres Cordero government. Her struggle for women's rights led her to found the March 8 movement in 1975, considered the first feminist organization in Azuay.

In 1977, she founded the Women's Broad Front, a national political organization that brought together progressive women of the left. She was also a founding member of the Azuay Women's Network.

Piedad Moscoso died on November 13, 2010. Years later her remains were transferred to the Heritage Cemetery of Cuenca's park of illustrious figures. Her headstone is inscribed with the phrase "Symbol of commitment and struggle for equity and social justice", and her grave is alongside that of socialist politician Guadalupe Larriva.

In October 2014, Moscoso was posthumously declared an Illustrious Woman by the Cantonal Council of Cuenca for her struggle for women's rights. In 2016 she received the Matilde Hidalgo de Procel Award from the National Assembly of Ecuador.

== See also ==
- Anarchism in Ecuador
