= Peleles =

- Title card
- Also known as: Pushovers
- Genre: Comedy drama
- Created by: Rodrigo Cuevas
- Directed by: León Errázuriz; Roberto Rebolledo
- Starring: Mario Horton; Claudio Arredondo; Daniel Alcaíno; Néstor Cantillana; Cristián Campos
- Opening theme: Bad to the Bone by George Thorogood and The Destroyers
- Country of origin: Chile
- Original language: Spanish
- No. of episodes: 83

Production
- Producer: Alberto Gesswein
- Production location: Santiago

Original release
- Network: Canal 13
- Release: July 26, 2011 – January 15, 2012

Peleles, also known as Pushovers, is a Chilean television soap opera created by Rodrigo Cuevas. Starring Mario Horton, Claudio Arredondo, Daniel Alcaíno, Néstor Cantillana, and Cristián Campos, it aired on Canal 13 from July 26, 2011, to January 15, 2012.

== Cast ==
- Mario Horton as Ignacio "Nacho" Varas.
- Claudio Arredondo as Alberto "Tito" Jara.
- Cristián Campos as Felipe "Pipe" Tagle
- Daniel Alcaíno as Patricio "Pato" Carmona.
- Néstor Cantillana as Fabián "Fabi" Pizarro.
- Blanca Lewin as Mónica Dávila.
- Adriano Castillo as José Santos Cabrera.
- Mariana Loyola as Pamela Leiva.
- Francisca Imboden as Susana "Sussy" Leiva.
- Carolina Arregui as Andrea Barahona.
- María José Bello as Daniela Acosta.
- Pablo Schwarz as Rudolph Tapia "El alemán" / Jürgen Rojas.
- Martín Castillo as Alberto "Titito" Jara.
- Andrea Velasco as Valentina Tagle.
- Edgardo Bruna as Fernando Varas.
- Carmen Disa Gutiérrez as Gladys Dávila.
- Verónica Soffia as Paula Jara.
- Cristóbal Tapia-Montt as Gonzalo Baeza.
- María Elena Duvauchelle as Hilda Cáceres.
- José Soza as Jorge "Koke" Retamales.
- Loreto Valenzuela as Teresa Mendizaval.
- Antonia Zilleruelo as Emilia Varas.
- Heidrun Breier as Irina Burkhard "La Rusia".
- Ramón Llao as Arsenio Camacho.
- Vanessa Borghi as Rosario.
- Edinson Díaz as Roque Gamarra.
- Mauricio Diocares as Saturnino Gamarra.
- Vanessa Monteiro as Ximena Neira.
- Belén Díaz as Rosita Verdugo.
- Daniel Kiblisky as Marco Gumucio.
- Francisco Braithwaite as "El Rata".
- Berta Lasala as Comisario Lilia Matamala.
- Diego Casanueva as Adrián Fonseca.

=== Special participations ===
- Nelson Brodt as Gerardo Marambio.
- José Secall as Ricardo Barahona.
- Hugo Medina as Ramiro Lillo.
- Sonia Mena as Gloria de Leiva.
- Gabriela Medina as "Tía Myriam".
- Loreto Moya as Doctor Irigoyen.
- Juan Carlos Caceres as Detective Soto.
- Pancho González as Ismael.
- Alejandro Montes as Beto Fénix.
- Juan Pablo Miranda as "El Mono".
- Ariel Mateluna as "El Chocolo".
- Noelia Arias as Employee of the Cabaret
- Nicolás Bravo as fruitseller
- Tomás Castillo as DJ.
- Marco da Silva as warden of the company
- Peter Rock as himself
- Adriana Barrientos as herself
