= Alicia Villarreal (artist) =

Chilean visual artist, professor and curator

- Born: Alicia María Villarreal Mesa; December 1957 (age 68–69); Santiago, Chile
- Occupation: Visual arts
- Notable work: Ejercicio de copia Musba, Museo de Barrio; Condición de lugar
- Website: www.aliciavillarrealchile.cl

Alicia María Villarreal Mesa (born December 1957) is a Chilean visual artist, professor, and curator. She specializes in avant-garde conceptual art and experimentalism. She studied the visual arts at the Pontifical Catholic University of Chile and later at the Erg Saint-Luc School Search Graphique in Brussels. Her work shows "a reflective dimension on personal and collective memory and on language and the means of artistic production."

In 2003, she was nominated for the Altazor Award's category for Installation and Videoart for her work Ejercicio de copia. Five years later, Villarreal received another nomination for the same award and category for Musba, Museo de Barrio and yet again in 2009 for Condición de lugar. In 2010, she finally received the Altazor Award for Grabar el Territorio, en la muestra colectiva Territorios de Estado: Paisaje y Cartografía de Chile, Siglo XIX and in that same year was decorated by the Circle of Critics of Chilean Art.

Villarreal has participated in several solo and group exhibitions during her career, among them the Fifth Valparaíso International Art Biennial in 1981, Ave 87, the video installation of the Arnhem Audiovisual Festival in the Netherlands in 1987, the first Visual Arts Biennial of Mercosur - Vertiente Cartography in Porto Alegre a decade later, the 2012 Havana Biennial, and exhibitions of her works Los Límites de la Fotografía, Campos de Hielo, Arte Joven en Chile (1986-1996), Chile: 100 años tercera etapa, La Escuela Imaginaria, Territorios de Estado, Trienal de Artes Visuales and Exposición Centenario at the Chilean National Museum of Fine Arts (1996, 1997, 2000, 2002, 2009 and 2010 respectively), Mavi la Colección at the Museo de Artes Visuales (2011), and other smaller exhibits elsewhere in Chile, Latin America, the United States of America, Canada, and Europe.
