= Ximena Zomosa =

- Born: 1966 (age 59–60); Santiago, Chile
- Education: Universidad Católica de Chile

Ximena Zomosa (born 1966, Santiago, Chile) is a visual artist and curator who works in contemporary art and conceptual art, whose work demonstrates — from the perspective of gender — a discourse that is fundamentally feminine. She acted in a managerial and curatorial capacity at the Balmaceda Youth Art Gallery, a space for art by emerging Chilean artists.

== Biography ==
Zomosa studied art at the Pontifical Catholic University of Chile, which complemented her studies at various Chilean universities. Her work is characterized by "la originalidad mostrada en el empleo de materiales sacados de la vida cotidiana y dispuestos en instalaciones inusuales (...). En su afán transformatorio, es evidente un sentido autobiográfico e irónico frente a lo femenino y lo doméstico" ("originality demonstrated in the use of materials from everyday life and displayed in unusual installations (...). In her eager transformation, there is a sense of the autobiographical and irony in the face of that which is feminine and that which is domestic").

In 2004, Zomosa received the Altazor Award of the National Arts in the category of Installations and Video Art for Colección de la artista (Artist's Collection).

Throughout her career, Zomosa has participated in solo exhibitions as well as exhibitions featuring other artists, including V Bienal de Estandartes in Tijuana (2008); Concours Matisse 1992, Concours Matisse 1994, and II Biennial Premio Gunthe, in the Chilean National Museum of Fine Arts (1992, 1994, and 1995, respectively); Última Generación at the Chiloé Museum of Modern Art (1995), Everyday at the Art Gallery of New South Wales for the Biennale of Sydney (1998); El Lugar dentro at the Casa Colorada Museum (1999); Proyecto de Borde at the Valdivia Museum of Contemporary Art (1999); Project N11, Muro Sur arte chileno contemporáneo for the la Biennale of Shanghai (2004); Portable Affairs, Project of a Boundary at Artspace Sydney Visual Arts Centre in Sydney (2005); and Arte Mujer y Compromiso Político at the Museo de la Solidaridad Salvador Allende (2009), and other exhibitions in the United States, Latin America, Australia, and Europe.
