= Allende en su laberinto =

2014 Chilean film

- Film poster
- Directed by: Miguel Littín
- Written by: Miguel Littín
- Produced by: Coproducción Chile-Venezuela; Zetra Films; La Taguara Fílmica
- Starring: Daniel Muñoz; Aline Küppenheim; Horacio Videla; Juvel Vielma; Gustavo Camacho; Roque Valero
- Cinematography: Cristián Petit-Laurent
- Release date: 2014
- Running time: 90 minutes
- Country: Chile
- Language: Spanish

Allende en su laberinto (lit. 'Allende in his labyrinth') is a 2014 Chilean film directed by Miguel Littín. The film is a fictional account of the events in the Palacio de la Moneda in Santiago de Chile and the last hours of life of President Salvador Allende during the 1973 Chilean coup d'état.

The film has been screened in Chile and in Venezuela. The film also won the historical miniseries category of the Television National Fund in Chile, gaining approval to be aired as a television series.

== Cast ==
- Daniel Muñoz as Salvador Allende
- Juvel Vielma as Jano
- Gustavo Camacho
- Marcos Moreno
- Jose Roberto Diaz as Chilean Deputy
- Antonio Delli
- Vera Linares
