= Capital (Ethiopia) =

Ethiopian weekly business newspaper

- Type: Weekly newspaper
- Format: Broadsheet
- Owner(s): Crown Publishing, plc
- Editor: Teguest Yilma
- Founded: 1998; 27 years ago
- Website: www.capitalethiopia.com

Capital (also known as Capital Ethiopia) is an Ethiopian weekly business newspaper published and distributed by Crown Publishing Plc. It is published once a week, on Sundays. It was established in December 1998 with a pro business perspective, and styles itself "the paper that promotes free enterprise".

== Contents ==
The newspaper has opinions and special segments like the historian Richard Pankhurst's Corner, sports commentary, cartoons, editorials, etc.

Capital subscribers are often from local business community, non governmental organizations, international organizations, academics and individuals. It aims to boost the free press and information flow, while encouraging and nurturing the private sector with necessary information. It promotes ideological changes and development among the civil society for the betterment of the country, and creates employment opportunities, whilst developing professional journalism.

Its managing director and executive editor, Teguest Yilma, was awarded the National Order of Merit (France) on 16 December 2009 at the embassy of France in Addis Ababa.

Its main competitor is Addis Fortune, whose circulation it surpassed in 2007. However, the circulation of the two does not exceed 20,000 out of the 150,000 total newspaper circulation, which itself compares to a national population of over 90,000,000 persons.
