= Sigsig Canton =

Sígsig Canton
- Canton
- Flag

- Location of Azuay Province in Ecuador.

- Sigsig Canton in Azuay Province
- Coordinates: 3.0897°S 78.8032°W
- Country: Ecuador
- Province: Azuay Province
- Capital: Sígsig
- Time zone: UTC-5 (ECT)
- Website: https://www.sigsig.gob.ec/datos-generales-del-gad/

Sígsig Canton (Spanish pronunciation: [ˈsiɣsiɣ]) is a canton of Ecuador, located in the Azuay Province. Its capital is the town of Sígsig. Its population at the 2001 census was 24,635.

== Demographics ==
Ethnic groups as of the Ecuadorian census of 2010:

- Mestizo 93.9%
- White 3.0%
- Afro-Ecuadorian 1.5%
- Indigenous 1.4%
- Montubio 0.2%
- Other 0.1%
