= Orlando Lübbert =

Chilean screenwriter and film director (born 1945)

- Born: 1 December 1945 (age 79); Santiago, Chile
- Occupation(s): Screenwriter; Film director

Orlando Lübbert (born 1 December 1945) is a Chilean screenwriter and film director. He is best known for his film A Cab for Three.

== Filmography ==
- Der Übergang (1978)
- The Colony (1987)
- Taxi para tres (2001)
- Cirqo (2013)
