= Centro Cultural Matucana 100 =

Cultural center in Santiago, Chile

Coordinates: 33°26′43″S 70°40′48″W

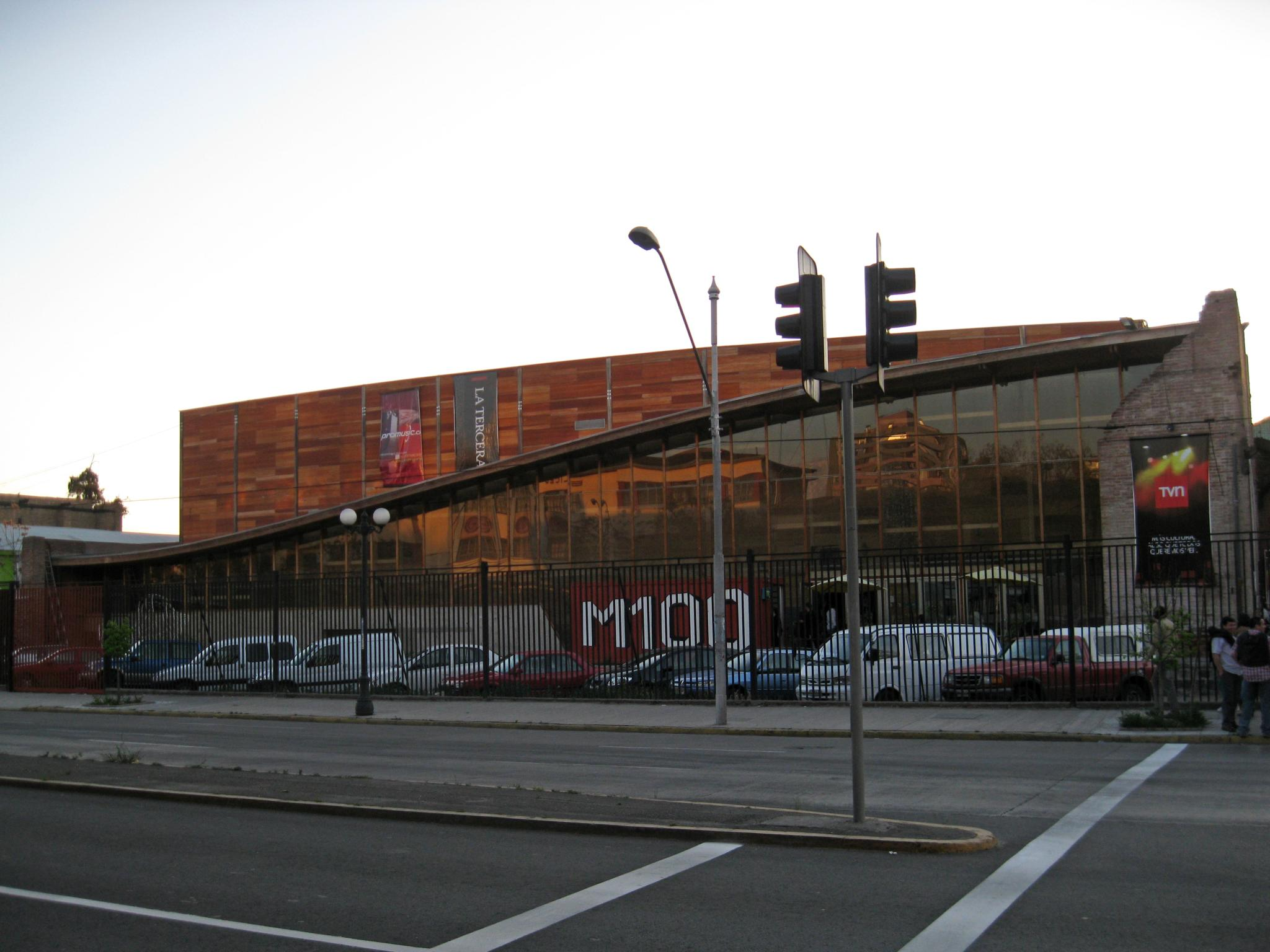
Matucana 100 Cultural Center

The Centro Cultural Matucana 100 is a cultural center located in the commune of Estación Central in Santiago, Chile, near Quinta Normal Park. Matucana 100 is a not-for-profit corporation that hosts and plans cultural events and educational programs related to the contemporary arts including dance, theatre, music, photography, the visual arts and cinema. The center takes its name from its street address.

== History ==
The Matucana 100 cultural center was inaugurated in 2001. The site for the center previously served as storage sheds for the water supply system, and before that, it was the location of a railcar repair station.

The space was founded in order to revitalize the area between Quinta Normal Park and the Estación Central neighborhood - where Santiago’s central bus and railway station are located - establishing a culturally oriented neighborhood to be called Circuito Cultural Santiago Poniente. It aimed to be a public space supporting artists, art students, and participating public.

The earthquake of February 2010 left the Gallery of Visual Arts - the original building of which dates to 1911 - with severe structural damage. In 2011, a Bicentennial fund was granted to the center to repair the Gallery.

Matucana 100 has twice hosted the Chilean Altazor Awards for achievement in the arts.
