= Victor Emilio Moscoso Cárdenas =

Ecuadorian Roman Catholic priest

Blessed Victor Emilio Moscoso y Cárdenas SJ

Martyr
- Born: 21 April 1846; Cuenca, Azuay, Ecuador
- Died: 4 May 1897 (aged 51); Riobamba, Chimborazo, Ecuador
- Venerated in: Roman Catholic Church
- Beatified: 16 November 2019, Riobamba, Ecuador by Cardinal Giovanni Angelo Becciu
- Feast: 4 May, 23 November (Jesuit order)

Victor Emilio Moscoso y Cárdenas (21 April 1846 – 4 May 1897) was an Ecuadorian Roman Catholic priest and professed member from the Jesuits. He served as a teacher in the COPEM college in Riobamba since 1892 and it was there that he was slain during the Liberal Revolution which had started in 1895. Moscoso was a noted philosopher and taught rhetoric and grammar to his students while serving as a professor; he also served as the college's rector from 1893 until his assassination.

Initiatives to introduce his beatification cause commenced in the late 1990s during celebrations for the first centennial of his death. The cause was introduced not long after and he became titled as a Servant of God. Pope Francis approved his beatification after confirming that the slain priest had been killed "in odium fidei" (in hatred of the faith). The beatification was celebrated in Riobamba on 16 November 2019.

== Life ==
Victor Emilio Moscoso y Cárdenas was born in Cuenca in Ecuador on 21 April 1846 to Juan Manuel Anacleto de Lima Moscoso (1803–64) and Maria Antonia Cárdenas (1818–29.1.1887). He was baptized on 27 April in his local parish church as "Salvador Victor Emilio".

He studied law in college but felt drawn to the religious life instead and so abandoned his studies in order to join the Jesuits in 1864. He began his novitiate in Cuenca where the Jesuits had settled since the order was forced to leave Quito due to the anti-religious sentiment and persecution at the time. Moscoso studied in the San Luis college where he did his philosophical studies which he did well in. Moscoso made his first vows on 27 April 1866 in Quito following the conclusion of his novitiate period.

Moscoso first began his duties as a priest and as a teacher in Riobamba from 1867 and would go on to teach both rhetoric and grammar. He later began teaching from 1892 at the San Felipe Neri college in Riobamba and from 1893 until his death served as its rector. In 1895 the Liberal Revolution broke out in Ecuador which triggered a series of persecutions and a wave of anti-religious sentiment against religious and priests. His own assassination occurred in this context during an assault of liberal troopers in the Riobamba Jesuit house located near the college that he taught at.

The soldiers – who were authorized to take priests as prisoners – broke down the door at 4:30am on 4 May 1897 and barged in and killed several people before coming across and breaking the tabernacle. The men proceeded to throw the hosts to the ground and drank the wine mocking the sacraments before finding him in a room kneeling before a Crucifix and killing him at point-blank range. Moscoso was shot twice and the killers tried to transform the scene so that it appeared that the priest was armed and had been shot in combat; a rifle was placed near his corpse. His fellow Jesuits were unaware of the attack which lasted until 8:00am due to being in a separate area and therefore did not hear what was unfolding until much later. Blood was found running down his temples and over a purple scarf that he was wearing at the time.

== Beatification ==
The Riobamba diocese opened the diocesan process of investigation on 4 May 2000 and later closed it on 14 October 2005 before transferring all the relevant evidence to the Congregation of the Saints. The C.C.S. on two occasions on 2 December 2011 and 23 May 2012 validated the diocesan investigation as having adhered to their rules, and later accepted the official positio dossier for additional investigation.

Theologians in 2018 voiced their assent to the cause and the C.C.S. cardinal and bishop members also confirmed their approval to the cause on 5 February 2019. Pope Francis cleared Moscoso for beatification after signing a decree on 12 February 2019 that recognized that the slain priest had been killed "in odium fidei" (in hatred of the faith). The beatification was celebrated in Riobamba on 16 November 2019 with Cardinal Giovanni Angelo Becciu presiding over the Mass on the pope's behalf.

The current postulator for this cause is the Jesuit priest Pascual Cebollada Silvestre.
