= Francesca Ancarola =

Chilean singer and songwriter (born 1968)

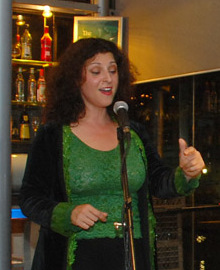

Background information
- Born: 18 March 1968 (age 57)
- Origin: Chile
- Genres: Folk, Latin American music, jazz, bolero
- Instruments: Vocals, guitar
- Website: francescaancarola.cl

María Francesca Ancarola Saavedra (born 18 March 1968) is a Chilean singer and songwriter. Ancarola's musical style is a mix of folk and jazz, with social justice themes, and she is considered a part of the Chilean New Song movement.

== Career ==
Ancarola began her musical career in the 1980s, winning a prize at a festival organised by the magazine La Bicicleta y el Café del Cerro, a publication associated with the Chilean New Song movement.

She graduated from the University of Chile with a degree in music and later studied singing at the Pontifical Catholic University of Chile. In 1997, she won a Fulbright scholarship to study at the Manhattan School of Music.

Ancarola's first album as a soloist was Que el canto tiene sentido (English: For a song has meaning) in 1999. The album's title was a tribute to the song Manifiesto by Víctor Jara, the popular singer-songwriter of the New Song movement and activist, who was killed by the Pinochet-led military regime in 1973.

Her subsequent albums, Pasaje de ida y vuelta (Return ticket – 2000) and Jardines humanos (Human Gardens – 2002), further developed her Latin American fusion style, the former receiving an Altazor Award. In 2003 she released Sons of the same sun through Petroglyph Records, based in Taos, New Mexico. This album included some of her repertoire sung in English.

In 2004 she released Contigo aprendí (With you I learned), an album composed of boleros.

Ancarola again paid tribute to Jara in 2006 with the release of her album Lonquén, where Ancarola covers some of Jara's songs using "more contemporary language". "Victor came from a poor family, but despite this he managed to transcend and cultivate himself... to become an icon of our music," Ancarola said regarding the album's release. The album earned the musician her second Altazor Award.

In 2008, Ancarola released Arrullos (Lullabies), an album of children's songs, which was nominated for an Altazor Award.

Ancarola's album Templanza (Temperance) was released in 2012.

In 2016, she released a full album titled Espejo de los Sueños.

== Influences ==
Ancarola's musical influences include Víctor Jara, Violeta Parra, Milton Nascimento, Chabuca Granda, Silvio Rodríguez and Chico Buarque.

== Discography ==
- Que el canto tiene sentido (1999)
- Pasaje de ida y vuelta (2000)
- Jardines humanos (2002)
- Sons of the same sun (2003)
- Contigo aprendí (2004)
- Lonquén (2006)
- Arrullos (2008)
- Templanza (2012)
- Espejo de los Sueños (2016)
- La Desentonada (2018)

== See also ==
- Music of Chile
- Nueva Canción Chilena
