= The Sentimental Teaser =

- film poster
- Directed by: Cristián Galaz; Nury Castro; Roberto Artiagoitia
- Written by: Mateo Iribarren
- Starring: Nelson Villagra
- Cinematography: Antonio Farías
- Music by: Carlos Cabezas
- Release date: October 1999
- Running time: 87 minutes
- Country: Chile
- Language: Spanish

The Sentimental Teaser (Spanish: El Chacotero Sentimental) is a 1999 Chilean film directed by Cristián Galaz. The protagonist is a DJ named Rumpy, and his listeners call in to the radio station to tell their stories.

A 2007 sequel was released, titled Radio Corazón.

== Summary ==
The film, which premiered in Chile on October 28, 1999, is based on the radio show "El chacotero sentimental" (The Sentimental Jester). The plot follows a typical day of the show, where the Rumpy (Roberto Artiagoitía), the host, receives three phone calls from two men and a woman who share their stories, ranging from laughter to tears, but always receiving wise advice from the Rumpy, better known as "the sentimental jester" himself, and a song to liven up the situation, which is always introduced by the popular phrase: "we're going to play you a song". These stories make up the plot of the movie, with the first and third being comedic, and the second being more dramatic. The radio show is one of the most popular and listened to in Chile, and the colloquial language used by "El Rumpi" on the air allows the Chilean audience to understand all the details of the lustful stories that the callers share.

== Cast ==
- Roberto Artiagoitia as Rumpy
- Daniel Muñoz as Juan
- Tamara Acosta as Mía
- Claudia Celedón as Maria
- Lorene Prieto as Claudia
- Pablo Macaya as Johnny
- Ximena Rivas as Carmen
- Patricia Rivadeneira as Alicia
- Mateo Iribarren as Carmen's father
