= Coronation (2000 film) =

2000 film

- Chilean theatrical film poster
- Directed by: Silvio Caiozzi
- Starring: Julio Jung; María Cánepa; Adela Secall
- Cinematography: David Bravo
- Music by: Luis Advis
- Release date: 2000
- Running time: 140 min.
- Country: Chile
- Language: Spanish

Coronation (Spanish: Coronación) is a 2000 Chilean drama film directed by Silvio Caiozzi. It was Chile's submission to the 73rd Academy Awards for the Academy Award for Best Foreign Language Film, but it was not nominated.

== Plot ==
The film tells the story of Andrés (Julio Jung), a man leading a boring and bourgeois life in a large mansion with his grandmother, Elisa de Ábalos (María Cánepa), an elderly woman who gradually loses touch with reality. The monotony of Andrés' life is disrupted when Estela (Adela Secall), a young and innocent villager, arrives at the mansion and immediately becomes the object of his attraction. This triggers an internal struggle within Andrés caused by his newfound feelings. Meanwhile, Estela falls in love with Mario (Paulo Meza), a humble welder from the neighborhood who happens to be the brother of a petty criminal. It is this latter character who sets off the final conflict of the film.

== Cast ==
- María Cánepa - Elisa de Ábalos
- Julio Jung - Andrés Ábalos
- Adela Secall - Estela
- Myriam Palacios - Rosario
- Luis Dubó - René
