= Pablo Herrera (musician) =

Cuban hip hop music producer

Pablo D. Herrera Veitia is a Cuban hip hop music producer. Herrera served his country in the education system as a teacher at Havana University. Herrera has written a thesis on African-American expression and also has degrees in both English and Russian translation. Through his work in Cuba's free university education system, Herrera has had the opportunity to mentor many young rap artists, and direct their music in a positive direction.

Herrera's main contribution to Cuban music however, hasn't been through his teachings, but rather his work as a rap producer on the island. Herrera has earned the undisputed title, of "the top rap producer," in Cuba. Groups will literally risk their entire careers for the opportunity to perform just once in front of Herrera, because of his importance to rap in Cuba. Herrera's musical talent isn't questioned, but more important than that is his close relationship with the Cuban government—essential to success in Cuba. Herrera's relationship with the Ministry of Culture has worked to authenticate rap as both an expression of Cuban beliefs and a musical sound that is fundamentally Cuban.

Herrera's work with the government reached its apex in 1998, when "Abel Prieto, the Minister of Culture, officially declared rap 'an authentic expression of cubanidad' and began nominally funding the annual rap festival." This official state recognition ensured that rap wasn't simply a temporary fad soon to go back across the sea like the island's tides, but an official, growing style of music that was being "Cubanized."

Herrera has another distinct advantage over other Cuban producers—his musical technology. While by most standards his set-up could be described as ordinary or banal, in Cuba, he is one of very few people capable of producing a high-quality musical sound. Herrera's musical ability and technology made him an obvious choice to produce the popular CD, "Cuban Hip-Hop All Stars" in 2001, an accompilation of the major Cuban hip-hop stars for the first time.

Regarding Cuban rap music, Herrera serves as an old guard capable of serving both the young and old generations. As someone who lived on the island prior to the "Special Period" which marked the end of Soviet Union aid to Cuba, he understand the importance of remaining authentic to the original ideals and culture of "la revoluicion". He also has the ability to understand the needs and desires of young Cuban rappers, through his teachings, and because of his extensive experience mentoring young groups. When asked about the message of Cuban rap, Herrera responded, "Rap is like a virus, its dialectic is always changing, absorbing everything around it. I think in the end, what makes Cuban hip-hop Cuban is simply that it is being made by Cubans. They're talking about our society from the perspective of people who were born and raised in Cuba during the socialist revolution. It is authentic music in that it is our own."
