= Hernán Rivera Letelier =

Chilean novelist

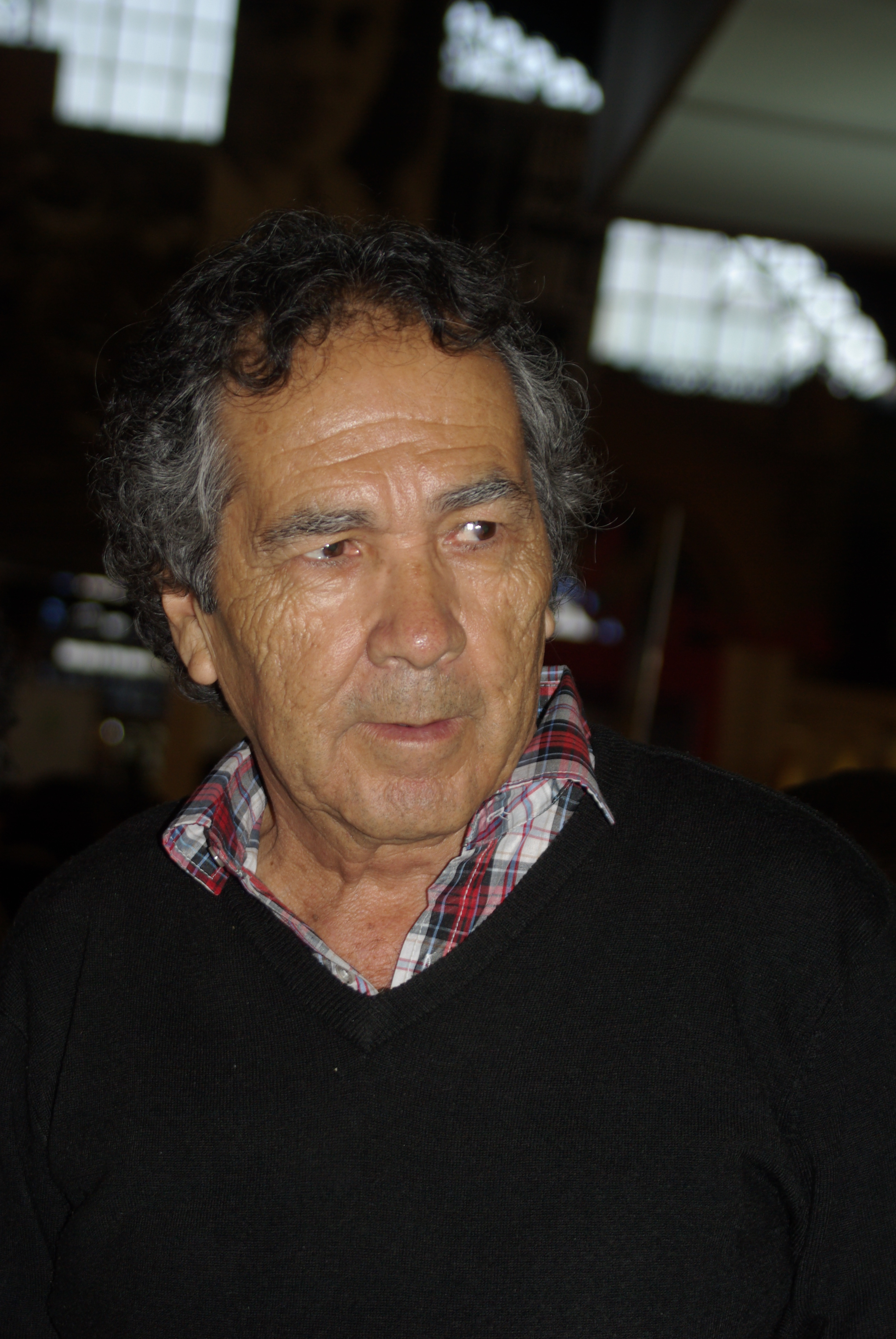
Hernán Rivera Letelier (2015)

Hernán Rivera Letelier (born 11 July 1950 in Talca, Chile) is a Chilean novelist. Until the age of 11 he lived in the Algorta saltpeter mining town, in the north of Chile. When it was closed down, he and his family moved to Antofagasta, where his mother died. His siblings went to live with his aunts. He stayed in Antofagasta, alone, until he was about 11. To survive, he sold newspapers. Later he worked as a messenger for Anglo Lautaro Nirate Company, until his thirst for adventure led him to spend three years traveling in Chile, Bolivia, Perú, Ecuador and Argentina. He returned to Antofagasta in 1973 and began to work at another company, Mantos Blancos. He married a 17-year-old girl when he was 24. Later he left for Pedro de Valdivia, another saltpeter mining town. He completed his seventh and eighth years of study at night school, and at the Inacap educational institute he earned his license as a secondary education instructor. Today he lives in Antofagasta with his wife and four children. He has received the Premio Consejo Nacional de Libro (Chilean National Book Award) twice, in 1994 and 1996. His novel El arte de la resurrección won the Premio Alfaguara de Novela in Spain in 2010.

Although his early works consisted of poetry and stories (Poemas y Pomadas Cuentos breves y Cuescos de brevas), it is as a novelist that he has had the greatest success, both critical and popular. His books have been translated into several languages and a film adaption of one novel has recently been released.

He dreams of having a literary style which blends "the magic of Juan Rulfo, the marvels of Gabriel García Márquez, the playfulness of Cortázar, the refinement of Carlos Fuentes, and the intelligence of Borges." El arte de la resurrección is a comic love story set in the early 1940s during a strike by saltpetre miners in barren northern Chile. It centres on the obsession of the historical-mythical folk preacher El Cristo de Elqui (the Christ of Elqui) with making a disciple of a devout prostitute called Magalena Mercado.

== Published works ==
- Poemas y pomadas (Poems and Ointments). 1988
- Cuentos breves y cuesco de brevas (Shorts Tales and Tales About Figs). 1990
- La reina Isabel cantaba rancheras (The Queen Isabel Sang Mexican Music). 1994
- Himno del ángel parado en una pata (The Anthem of the Angel Standing on one Foot). 1996
- Fatamorgana de amor con banda de música (Mirage of Love with Band of Musicians). 1998
- Donde mueren los valientes (Where Brave Men Perish). Short stories. 1999
- Los trenes se van al purgatorio (Trains Leave for Purgatory). 2000
- Santa María de las flores negras (Santa María of the Black Flowers). 2002
- Canción para Caminar Sobre las Aguas (Song for Walking on Water). 2004
- El Romance del Duende que me Escribe las Novelas (The Romance of the Leprechaun Who Writes My Novels). 2005
- El Fantasista (The Fantasist). 2007
- Mi Nombre es Malarrosa (My Name is Malarrosa). 2008
- La Contadora de Películas (The Movie-Teller). 2009
- El arte de la resurrección (The Art of Resurrection). 2010
- El Escritor de Epitafios (The Writer of Epitaphs). 2011
- Historia de Amor con Hombre Bailando (Love Story with a Dancing Man). 2013
- El vendedor de pájaros (The Bird-Seller). 2014.
- La muerte es una vieja historia(Love is an Ancient Story). 2017
- La muerte tiene olor a Pachuli (Death Smells of Pachuli). 2017
- La muerte se desnuda en La Habana (Death Strips Naked in Havana). 2017
- El hombre que miraba al cielo (The Man Who Looked at the Sky). 2018
- El autodidacta (The Self-Taught Man). 2019
- Epifaníá en el desierto (Epiphany in the Desert). 2020
- El secuestro de la hermana Tegualda (The Kidnapping of Sister Tegualda). 2021
- Hombres que llegan a un pueblo (Men Who Arrive at a Town).2022

== Translations ==
Many of Hernán Rivera Letelier's books have been translated into foreign languages, including French, Italian, Portuguese, German, Dutch, Polish and Turkish. An English translation of La Contadora de Películas (The Movie-Teller) by Margaret Jull Costa was published by MacLehose in November 2023.

== Film ==
A film based on La Contadora de Películas (The Movie-Teller) directed by Lone Scherfig and starring Bérénice Beko, Daniel Brühl and Antonio de la Torre was released in 2023. Screen adaptation by Isabel Coixet, Hernán Rivera Letelier, and Rafa Russo.
