= Daniel Alcaíno =

Chilean actor and comedian

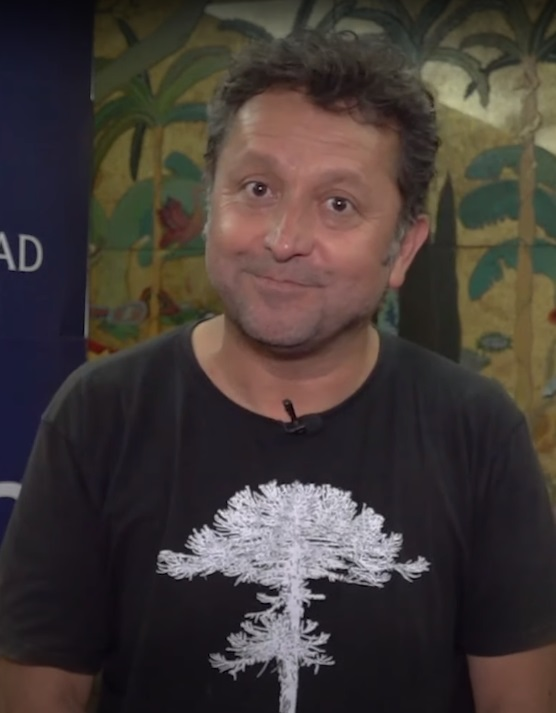
- Alcaíno in 2023
- Born: Daniel Alcaíno Cuevas; 6 April 1972 (age 54); Santiago, Chile
- Education: University of Chile
- Occupations: Actor, comedian
- Years active: 1996–present
- Spouse: Berta Lasala (m. 2001)
- Children: 1

Daniel Alcaíno Cuevas (Spanish pronunciation: [daˈnjel alkaˈino ˈkwe.βas], born April 6, 1972) is a Chilean actor and comedian. He is popularly known for his comedy characters Peter Veneno (roughly based in Ivan Zamorano), and Yerko Puchento, an outspoken showbusiness journalist and political satirist. Although he has gain further recognition for dramatic roles as well such as Exequiel Pacheco in Los 80 and Mario Medina in 42 Days of Darkness.

== Biography and career ==
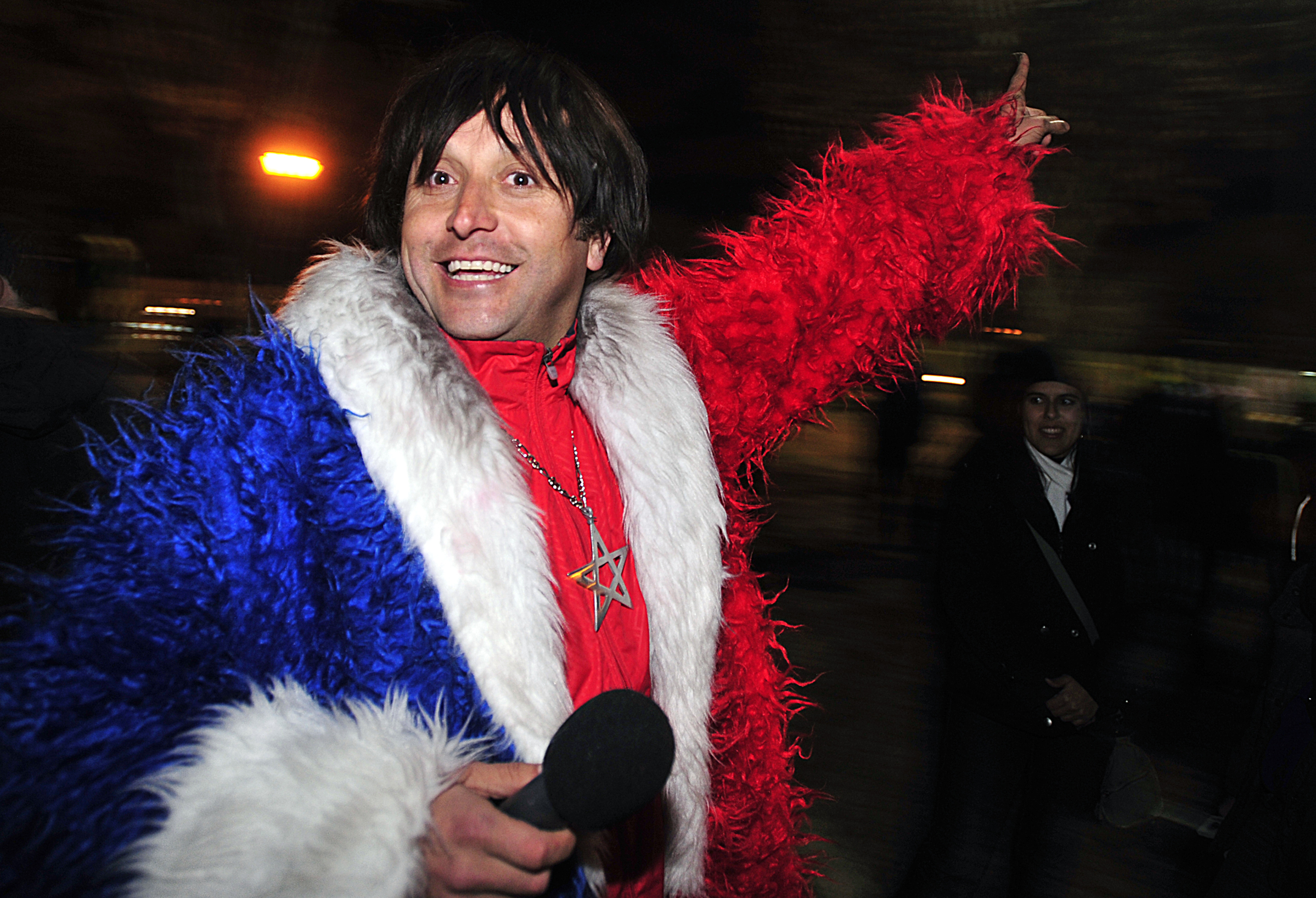
Alcaino characterized as "Peter Veneno" at the 2010 FIFA World Cup.

Born and raised in Santiago, the capital of Chile, he attended the Liceo Cervantes when he was a teenager. After an unsuccessful attempt to study Law, Alcaíno embarked on a career as an actor and comedian, he studied at the Universidad de Chile.

Alcaíno is also recognized for his character Exequiel Pacheco in Los 80, a television series based on the lives of Chilean families during Augusto Pinochet's dictatorship. In August 2011, Alcaíno portrayed Patricio Carmona in Peleles.

In 2022 he portraited Mario Medina in the Netflix crime thriller series 42 Days of Darkness, which is partially based on the true story of the disappearance of Viviana Haeger in 2010, in southern Chile.
