= Altazor Award =

Chilean arts award

- Country: Chile
- First award: 2000
- Final award: 2014
- Website: http://www.premioaltazor.cl/

The Altazor Award of the National Arts or simply Altazor, was a Chilean award awarded annually. The winners are chosen by the own creators and performers of the arts. They were established in 1958, but were not awarded until 1999. The award consists of a cast-iron sculpture created by sculptor Sergio Castillo and a diploma. They were named in honor of Vicente Huidobro's work.

== History ==
The Altazor Award was presented by creators and performers from across the arts, and its name paid tribute to the eponymous work Altazor by the poet Vicente Huidobro. The award consisted of a cast-iron sculpture created by sculptor Sergio Castillo and a diploma. It was awarded from 2000 until 2014.

== Institutions in the Altazor Awards ==
- Sociedad Chilena del Derecho de Autor
- Sociedad de Autores Nacionales de Teatro, Cine y Audiovisual
- Sociedad de Creadores de Imagen Fija
- Corporación de Actores de Chile
- Sociedad Chilena de Intérpretes
- Sociedad de Derechos Literarios

== Nomination and award ==
The organizing committee invites all writers and artists to submit nominations for the different categories. The works, performances or productions candidates must have been released between December 1 of the previous year and November 30 of the same year. The nominations, in accordance with the candidates are put to the vote by members of the respective awards college. The vote takes place in two rounds. Schools awards consist of authors and artists nominated convenor that societies have a minimum of 10 members by category. Members last 3 years in office may designate the societies that replace in whole or in part. Once installed, the schools may nominate award autonomously to a maximum of 20 new members. Altazor Award winners are permanent members of the respective school awards.

=== The College awards ===
- Literary Arts College
- College of Musical Arts
- College Performing Arts Theatre
- Performing Arts School of Dance
- College of Visual Arts Awards
- College of Media Arts award-Film
- College of Media Arts award-TV

== Ceremonies ==
Edition	Year	Venue	Date
1st	2000	Teatro Municipal de Santiago	March 30, 2000
2nd	2001	Teatro Municipal de Santiago	March 26, 2001
3rd	2002	Museo Nacional de Bellas Artes	March 25, 2002
4th	2003	Centro Cultural Matucana 100	March 24, 2003
5th	2004	Centro Cultural Matucana 100	April 5, 2004
6th	2005	Parque Bicentenario	April 25, 2005
7th	2006	Centro Cultural Palacio de La Moneda	April 11, 2006
8th	2007	Centro Cultural Estación Mapocho	April 11, 2007
9th	2008	Centro Cultural Teatro La Cúpula of the O'Higgins Park	April 7, 2008
10th	2009	Centro Cultural Teatro La Cúpula of the O'Higgins Park	April 21, 2009
11th	2010	Teatro Teletón	April 27, 2010
11th	2011	Centro de Eventos San Francisco	May 24, 2011

== Categories ==
=== Literary Arts ===
- Narrative
- Poetry
- Essay

=== Visual arts ===
- Painting
- Sculpture
- Engraving and Drawing
- Installation art and Video art
- Photography
- Graphic design and Illustration

=== Performing Arts Theatre ===
- Dramaturgy
- Director
- Actor
- Actress

=== Performing Arts Dance ===
- Choreography
- Male Dancer
- Female Dancer

=== Musical Arts ===
- Classical music
- Traditional music
- Pop
- Rock
- Playing

=== Media Arts Film ===
- Director - Film
- Director - Documentary
- Actor
- Actress
- Screenplay

=== Media Arts TV ===
- Director - Drama
- Director - TV Show
- Actor
- Actress
- Screenplay
