= Carmina Riego =

Chilean actress and cultural manager (born 1964)

- Born: Carmina Ibelda Riego Ramírez; 24 March 1964 (age 62); Santiago, Chile
- Education: University of Chile
- Occupations: Actress, cultural manager
- Years active: 1993–present

Carmina Riego Ramírez (born 24 March 1964) is a Chilean actress and cultural manager.

She has played diverse charismatic and popular characters in telenovelas, occasionally in the comedy genre, and is best known for the role of Esmeralda Peralta in Amores de Mercado (2001).

== Biography ==
Carmina Riego is a graduate of the University of Chile's School of Acting and Theater Design, where she obtained a Bachelor of Arts degree with mention in theater in 1993.

In 1995 she collaborated with the dramatist Ramón Griffero, starring in the plays La Gorda in 1995, Río abajo in 1996, and Almuerzo de mediodía in 1999, premiered at the Chilean National Theater. These productions have been recognized by critics and the public, both in Chile and abroad.

Her television debut was in the Televisión Nacional de Chile (TVN) telenovela Aquelarre (1999). Due to her positive reception in this, she was hired to be part of the staff of director María Eugenia Rencoret, in the dramatic area of public television, where she began to stand out for her versatility when playing charismatic and popular roles in comedic telenovelas.

In 2000 she acted in Santo ladrón, in which she and her sister – played by Lucy Salgado – become the owners of a picturesque café con piernas. In 2001 she took part in Amores de Mercado (2001), where her character managed to maintain popularity throughout the telenovela's broadcast. In this show she shared credits with Malucha Pinto and Mariana Loyola, playing the Peralta sisters. In 2003, she played the sassy prostitute from El Edén in Pecadores. In addition, she acted in Purasangre, Destinos cruzados, and Versus. In 2005 she starred in the sitcom Los Galindo, with Patricia López.

In 2006, Riego was called on by the executive producer of Canal 13's fiction area, Verónica Saquel, and performed in Descarado (2006), Don Amor (2008), and Cuenta conmigo (2009).

In 2011 she reappeared on television with a small role in the TVN series Los archivos del cardenal, and Solita camino on Mega. Later she was summoned for La chúcara, where she played the mother of the protagonist (Antonia Santa María), a role that brought her back to telenovelas after five years working in other genres.

In recent years she has participated in Acassuso by Rafael Spregelburd, directed by Francisco Albornoz, Medusa by Ximena Carrera, directed by Sebastián Vila, and El taller by Nona Fernández, directed by Marcelo Leonart.

== Filmography ==
=== Films ===
Year	Title	Role	Director
1995	La rubia de Kennedy		Arnaldo Valsecchi
2001	La Fiebre del Loco	Rita	Andrés Wood
2005	Las mujeres no van al cielo	Sandra	José Valdebenito
2011	Lección de pintura	Dama de llaves	Pablo Perelman
2015	La paradoja de Zenón	Prima Donna	Diego Escobar
2018	Cola de mono	Irene Ovando de Olivos	Alberto Fuguet

=== Telenovelas ===
Year	Title	Role	Channel
1991	Volver a empezar	Fresia	TVN
1999	Aquelarre	Lourdes Villanueva	TVN
2000	Santo ladrón	Roxana "Roxi" Huaiquil	TVN
2001	Amores de Mercado	Esmeralda Peralta	TVN
2002	Purasangre	Mireya Sánchez	TVN
2003	Pecadores	Lucrecia Álvarez	TVN
2004	Destinos cruzados	Irma González	TVN
2005	Versus	Gladys Miranda	TVN
2006	Descarado	Antonieta Durán	Canal 13
2008	Don Amor	Beatriz "Betty" Salas	Canal 13
2009	Cuenta conmigo	Norita Solé	Canal 13
2015	La chúcara	Carmen Cubillos	TVN
2017	La colombiana	Edna Barroso	TVN
2018	La reina de Franklin		Canal 13

=== Other TV series and miniseries ===
Year	Series	Role	Channel	Notes
2005	Los Galindo	Rosa Escarlet Galindo	TVN	Protagonist
2006	Tiempo final: en tiempo real	María Eugenia "Quena"	TVN	Episode: "Cita online"
2011–2014	Los archivos del cardenal	Norma Allende	TVN	Supporting role

== Theater ==
- La Gorda by Ramón Griffero
- Río abajo by Ramón Griffero, debuted at Chilean National Theater, 1995
- Almuerzo de mediodía by Ramón Griffero, 1999
- Bukowski, 2000
- Petrópolis, 2002
- Santiago High Tech by Cristián Soto, 2002
- La Habana – Madrid by Julio Cid, dir.: Maritza Rodríguez, debuted at Teatro San Ginés, 2002
- Las horas previas, 2004
- Acassuso by Rafael Spregelburd, dir.: Francisco Albornoz
- Medusa by Ximena Carrera, dir.: Sebastián Vila
- El Taller by Nona Fernández, dir.: Marcelo Leonart
- La mujer que estafó al Viejo Pascuero by Carla Zúñiga, dir.: Daniela Aguayo, debuted at Centro GAM, 2013
- Lucía, Centro GAM, 2015
- 99 La Morgue by Ramón Griffero, 2016
- Liceo de niñas, Centro GAM, 2016
- Parecido a la felicidad, 2016
- Piel de oveja, 2018
