= Wena profe =

- Genre: Telenovela
- Created by: Carlos Galofré
- Written by: Luis López-Aliaga; Rodrigo Ossandón; Francisca Fuenzalida
- Story by: Francisca Bustamante
- Directed by: Rodrigo Meneses; Francisca Bustamante
- Starring: Marcelo Alonso; María Elena Swett; Néstor Cantillana; Carolina Arregui; Bárbara Ruiz-Tagle; Francisco Dañobeitía; Matías Assler; Belén Soto; Daniela Nicolas
- Country of origin: Chile
- Original language: Spanish
- No. of seasons: 1
- No. of episodes: 159

Production
- Executive producer: Mauricio Campos
- Producer: Jenny Contreras
- Camera setup: Multi-camera
- Running time: 30 minutes
- Production company: Televisión Nacional de Chile

Original release
- Network: TVN
- Release: September 25, 2017 – May 11, 2018

Wena profe (lit: Hey teacher) is a Chilean telenovela that premiered on Televisión Nacional de Chile on September 25, 2017, and concluded on May 11, 2018. The series is written by Carlos Galofré, along with Luis López-Aliaga, Rodrigo Ossandón and Francisca Fuenzalida. It stars Marcelo Alonso and María Elena Swett as the titular character.

== Plot ==
When the musical career of Javier Meza (Marcelo Alonso), a failed upper-class musician, ends up collapsing, he decides to fool Bárbara Fernández (María Elena Swett), the rigid director of a school in Santiago, assuring that he is a teacher who seeks job. Thus little by little, the musician becomes fond of the course to which they are assigned, in addition to the director who is present in his heart. The problem arises when the teacher of quantum physics of the establishment and friend of Barbara, Rodrigo Sarmiento (Néstor Cantillana), discovers the lie of the singer without imagining that a love connection would form a trio between Javier, he and the director of the school that hides an unimaginable secret.

== Cast ==
- Marcelo Alonso as Javier Meza
- María Elena Swett as Bárbara Fernández
- Néstor Cantillana as Rodrigo "Chancho" Sarmiento
- Carolina Arregui as Ana María Sepúlveda
- Belén Soto as Florencia Domínguez / Meza Domínguez
- Bárbara Ruiz-Tagle as Macarena Palma Novoa
- Héctor Morales as Samuel Cornejo
- Alejandra Fosalba as Rosa Sanhueza
- Otilio Castro as Idefonso "Loco" Andrade
- Daniela Palavecino as Pamela Rojas
- Patricio Pimienta as Andrés Salas
- Matías Assler as Benjamín Salas
- Delfina Guzmán as Estela Novoa
- Patricio Achurra as Pedro Domínguez
- Gloria Laso as Loreto Montes
- Ana Reeves as Marta Contreras
- Amaya Forch as Jimena González
- Francisco Dañobeitía as Diego Vidal Fernández
- Juan Pablo Miranda as Patricio "Pato" Rojas
- Francisco Ossa as Manuel Castro Sanhueza
- Daniela Nicolás as Constanza Marshall
- Vivianne Dietz as Belén González
- Andrew Bargsted as Ignacio "Nashock" Castro Sanhueza
- Rodrigo Walker as Felipe "Pipe" Acuña Palma
- Valentina Becker as Trinidad Villarroel
- Santiago Urrejola as Ricardo "Zombi" Andrade
- Antonia Bosman as Antonia "Anto" Acuña Palma
- Ignacia Uribe as Josefina "Jo" Contreras
- Lucas Mosquera as Brooklyn
- Lorenzo Carrasco as Camilo Acuña Palma
- Antonella Orsini as Celeste Domínguez
- César Sepúlveda as Father of Diego
- Matilde Flores as Rocío Cornejo
