= Pobre rico =

- Genre: Comedy
- Based on: Nuevo Rico Nuevo Pobre by Jörg Hiller
- Written by: Alejandro Cabrera; María José Galleguillos; Guillermo Valenzuela; Benito Escobar
- Directed by: Rodrigo Velasquez Q. Nicolás Alemparte (2nd unit); María Eugenia Rencoret (TVN's dramatic dept.)
- Starring: Simón Pesutic; Alonso Quintero; Carolina Arregui; Francisco Reyes; Amparo Noguera; Mauricio Pesutic; Susana Hidalgo; César Caillet; Magdalena Müller; Valentina Carvajal; Fernando Kliche
- Opening theme: Como tú no hay dos (J. Kill)
- Country of origin: Chile
- Original language: Spanish
- No. of seasons: 1
- No. of episodes: 227

Production
- Executive producer: Patricio López
- Producer: Cecilia Aguirre
- Camera setup: Multicamera

Original release
- Network: TVN
- Release: 23 April 2012 – 11 March 2013

Related
- Nuevo Rico Nuevo Pobre; Aquí mando yo; Dos por uno

Pobre Rico (International Title: The Switch) is a 2012 Chilean telenovela produced and broadcast by TVN. The series is based on Colombia telenovela Nuevo Rico Nuevo Pobre.

== Plot ==
Freddy Perez (Simón Pesutic) and Nicolas Cotapos (Alonso Quintero) lead a normal life until now. The two boys are happy and comfortable in each of their worlds. While Freddy lives with his mother Eloisa (Carolina Arregui) and sister Megan (Teresita Commentz) in scarce economic conditions in Cerro Navia, Santiago, Nicolas is torn between the wealth and glamour of belonging to one of the richest and most powerful families in Chile. But one day they experience a radical change and face the news that will mark their lives: 17 years ago the babies of both families were switched at birth in a cold southern hospital.

When the families discover this error, it quickly becomes national news because of the fame of the powerful Cotapos family. The decision of what to do is settled in court. A court decision forces both teenagers to live for a year with their biological families. When they turn 18 they may decide for themselves who they would like to live with.

== Cast ==
- Simón Pesutic - Freddy Pérez
- Alonso Quintero - Nicolás Cotapos
- Carolina Arregui - Eloísa Rivas, Freddy's mother and Juan Carlos's ex-wife
- Francisco Reyes - Maximo Cotapos, Virginia's husband
- Amparo Noguera - Virginia Donoso, Maximo's wife
- Mauricio Pesutic - Juan Carlos Pérez, Eloisa's ex-husband
- Susana Hidalgo - Julieta Cotapos, Maximo and Virginia's elder daughter
- Álvaro Espinoza - Luis Felipe Tagle, Julieta's boyfriend
- Katyna Huberman - Rosa Lagos, Claudia's mother and Eloisa's best friend
- Gabriela Hernández - Sonia Hundurraga, Cotapos's maid
- Roberto Prieto - César Parra, Rosa's boyfriend and Juan Carlos's best friend
- Magdalena Müller - Claudia Lagos, Freddy's girlfriend and Rosa's daughter
- Valentina Carvajal - Martina Guzmán, Nicolás's girlfriend
- Francisco Puelles - Rodrigo Parra, César's son and Freddy's best friend
- Teresita Commentz - Megan Pérez, Eloisa and Juan Carlos's younger daughter

Supporting cast

- Otilio Castro - Óscar "Cachito" Muñoz, Maximo's half-brother
- Elvis Fuentes - Ramiro, Cotapos's chauffeur
- Silvia Santelices - Sara Garcia-Huidobro
- María Paz Grandjean - The Mexican, boxer
- César Caillet - Álex Garrido
- Bárbara Lama - Sandrita, secretary
- Otilio Castro - Óscar "Cachito" Muñoz, brother Maximo's
- Nicolás Poblete - Cristián Bascuñan
- Ariel Mateluna - Jorge Galdames Jr.
- Karla Melo - Denisse Lagos
- Jaime Omeñaca - Jorge "Anaconda" Galdames
- Marcelo Valdivieso - Professor Queirolo
- Sebastián Goya - Mario Williams
- Andrea Zuckermann - Zasha
- Jonathan Carvajal Romo - Danilo - "Joven Flayte"
- Carlos Silva - Richard - "Joven Flayte"
- Natalie Dujovne - Pamela Matamala
- Teresa Hales - Daniela Tepu
- Marina Salcedo - Kimberly Suason
