= Floribella =

Soap opera

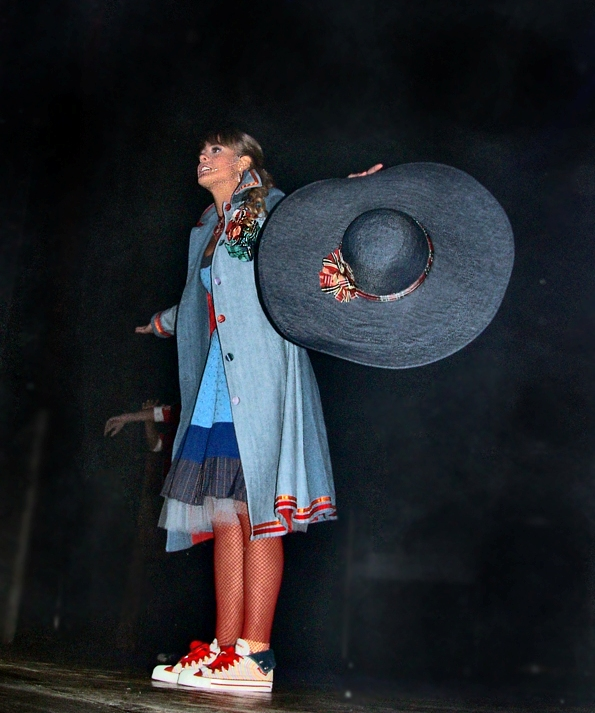
Juliana Silveira playing Floribella.

Floribella is a soap opera that was produced in Brazil, Portugal and Chile. Each of those countries had their own cast, but the show had the same name. Although they had the same name, all of them came from the first and original Argentine soap opera called Floricienta, created by Cris Morena.

== Plot ==
Floribella is based on the classic story Cinderella.

Flor is a pretty, young and poor girl who works for Frederico Fritzenwalden, who falls in love with Flor. However, Frederico is engaged with Delfina, who is a very mean and spoiled woman that fights against anything to marry the soonest possible Frederico and get his money. But like in the fairy tales, the love always wins: Frederico finds out all the truth about Delfina, and all what she did to everyone. In the final week of the soap opera, Frederico dies (he dies differently in each country version), and with this ending, a new story starts with Flor and Conde Máximo Augusto, so this way, the second season of Floribella begins.

== Floribella Brazil ==
Floribella, as portrayed in the Brazilian version by Juliana Silveira

Floribella was aired on the Rede Bandeirantes Channel of Television. The first season started on April 4, 2005, and ended on November 21, 2005. The second season began on January 23, 2006, and ended on August 28, 2006.

Floribella Brazil released its first musical album during the first season, which went double platinum. Also released its first musical DVD which topped the DVD sales ranking. Over 40 licensed products with the Floribella brand were released.

Later on, a second album was released (alongside the second season) which received Platinum certification according to ABPD. Four DVDs were also released: the first season, the second season, a TV special and the live musical.

A paperback novel, As Aventuras de Floribella, was released and it stayed during months on the top of the best-selling children fiction list compiled by O Globo and Epoca.

The cast also did a sold-out tour which included stops in several cities in Brazil from August to December 2006.

=== Music, Video, Book ===
- CD FLORIBELLA (Floribella Album) - 2005
- DVD FLORIBELLA AO VIVO (Floribella Live DVD) - 2005
- CD FLORIBELLA 2 (Floribella 2nd Season Album) - 2006
- CD DUPLO FLORIBELLA REMIXES & KARAOKÊS (Floribella Remix & Instrumental Double Album)
- BOX FLORIBELLA PRIMEIRA TEMPORADA (Floribella First Season, DVD Box)
- DVD FLORIBELLA: O ESPETÁCULO MUSICAL (Floribella: The Concert DVD)
- LIVRO: AS AVENTURAS DE FLORIBELLA (Book: Floribella's Adventures)

== Portugal ==
Floribella, as portrayed in the Portuguese version by Luciana Abreu

The show was a huge phenomenon in Portugal. The show started discrete but after a few weeks it exceeded expectation and became one of the most-watched programs in the country. Luciana Abreu played the title role.

The first season soundtrack reached 10 times platinum and sold over 200.000 copies, becoming the best-selling album ever in Portugal. Over 100 licensed products were released and two sold-out tours were made.

The second season of the show could not reach the success of the first.

=== Music, Video, Books ===
- Floribella soundtrack (2006)
- O Melhor Natal (Christmas soundtrack) (2006)
- DVD Floribella Karaoke (2006)
- Floribella 2 (Soundtrack) (2007)
- DVD RI-FIXE - O Musical da Floribella (2007)
- DVD Floribella Karaoke 2 (2007)
- Video game Floribella (2007)
- Coleção de Livros Floribella (Books Floribella) (2006)
- Roupa Floribella "clothes Floribella" (2007)
- Conjunto de Chávenas Floribella " Set cups Floribella" (2006)

== Chile ==
In 2006 began the production of the Chilean version by TVN, premiering in October of the same year. It reached high levels of rating, defeating its counterpart by Canal 13 Charly Tango. The original name, "Floricienta", could not be used because a private company had registered the trademark previously. It features actress Mariana Derderián on the role of Florencia and Cristián Arriagada on the role of Federico. It was the most-watched fictional program of 2007 but a second season was not commissioned since TVN did not want to kill the Prince, which was necessary for a second season to happen.

The CD achieved platinum certification.

Cast credits

- Mariana Derderian - Florencia
- Cristián Arriagada - Federico
- Luz Valdivieso - Agustina
- Coca Guazzini - Laura
- Ximena Rivas - Teresa
- Fernanda Urrejola - Sofía
- Juan José Gurruchaga - Gaspar
- Gloria Munchmeyer - Greta
- Cristián Riquelme - Pedro
- Ana Reeves - Nilda
- Mauricio Pesutic - Antonio
- Claudio Arredondo - Raúl
