= María Elena Swett =

Chilean actress (born 1979)

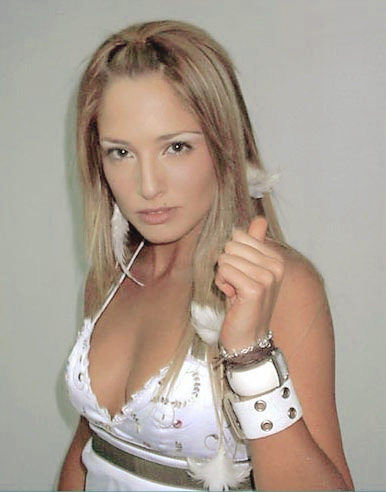
- In 2006
- Born: María Elena Swett Urquieta; 11 April 1979 (age 47); Santiago, Chile
- Occupations: Actress, TV presenter
- Years active: 1999 – present
- Spouse: Felipe Braun (2006-2010)

María Elena Swett Urquieta is a Chilean actress.

== Early life ==
She was born in Santiago on April 11, 1979. She studied at Colegio Nuestra Señora del Pilar and later at the Academia de Humanidades de Recoleta. Later, she studied theater at DUOC.

== Acting career ==
She debuted on television in 1999, in the series La otra cara del espejo on the Mega chain after being discovered by the director Herval Abreu.

In 2002 he signed a contract with the dramatic section of Canal 13, and was a participant in five telenovelas produced by Verónica Saquel. In this period of popularity with his role in Machos and Brujas, positioning herself alongside Jorge Zabaleta as the leading duo of the private channel. At the same time, he participated in the feature film Rojo intenso, where he shared roles with the Argentine actor Fabián Mazzei.

In 2008 he signed an exclusive contract with the Dramatic Area of Televisión Nacional de Chile, starring in eight telenovelas, five of them being a duo with Zabaleta. In the state channel, she consolidated her television career, positioning herself as the main actress of the public channel in 2012. In 2018, after 10 years, the channel decided not to renew her contract. In 2016, according to the publication Primer plano, she was one of the actresses paid between 2011 and 2015 with better earnings calculated at $15 million pesos, only surpassed by Claudia Di Girolamo, Paz Bascuñán and Sigrid Alegría.

In 2019 she wrote a six-month contract with Mega to star in 100 days to fall in love.

In 2020, she premiered the previously recorded microseries S.o.s mamis , in which she stars alongside Paz Bascuñán, Loreto Aravena, Tamara Acosta and Jenny Cavallo. She also, due to the COVID-19 pandemic, she began to do works online by Zoom for The Cow Company together with renowned Chilean actors. On December 1, 2020, she launches her first book S.o.s Mamis: el libro based on the microseries.

On November 1, 2021, joined "Who is the mask?" in Chilevisión where she was part of the jury / investigation team together with Cristian Riquelme, Macarena Pizarro and Cristián Sánchez for 3 seasons.

== Personal life ==
Formerly married to the Chilean actor Felipe Braun. She is also known as "Mane" by friends and family.

== Filmography ==
Film
Year	Title	Role	Director
2003	XS: The Worst Size	Pamela	Jorge López
2003	The Chosen One	Sara	Nacho Argiro & Gabriel Lopez
2006	Mirageman	Karol Valdivieso	Ernesto Díaz
2007	Rojo intenso	Laura	Javier Elorrieta
2022	S.O.S. Mamis: La película	Julia	Gabriela Sobarzo Mierzo
2023	S.O.S. Mamis 2: Mosquita muerta	Julia	Gabriela Sobarzo Mierzo

Television

Year	Title	Role	Other notes
1999	La Otra Cara del Espejo		1 Episode
2002	Mas que Amigos	Barbara	
2003	Machos	Fernanda Garrido	
2004	Hippie	Magdalena Arrieta	
2005	Brujas	Cassandra Garcia	
2006	Descarado	Verena Garreton	
2007	Papi Ricky	Catalina Rivera	
2007	Héroes	Francisca de Paula Segura y Ruiz	1 Episode
2008	Hijos del Monte	Paula Del Monte	
2009	Los Angeles de Estela	Margarita Bobadilla	
2010	La Familia de al lado	Pilar Echenique	
2011	Aqui Mando Yo	Sofia Kunkar	
2013	Socias	Ines Ventura	
2014	El Amor Lo Manejo Yo	Victoria Duque	
2015	Dueños del Paraíso	Vanessa Esparza	
2015	La Poseída	Olimpia Ruiz	
2016	El Camionero	Ema Kaulen	
2017	Wena profe	Bárbara Fernández	
2020	100 días para enamorarse	Laura	
2023	Dime con quién andas	Karina Ayala	

=== TV shows ===
- La Ruta de Asia (2009) - Host
