= La familia de al lado =

Chilean television series

- Created by: José Ignacio Valenzuela
- Starring: Álvaro Rudolphy; María Elena Swett; Jorge Zabaleta; Luz Valdivieso; Cristián Arriagada
- Country of origin: Chile
- Original language: Spanish
- No. of episodes: 125

Production
- Production location: Santiago de Chile
- Camera setup: Multi-camera
- Running time: 25–30 minutes
- Production company: Televisión Nacional de Chile

Original release
- Network: TVN

La Familia de al Lado (International title: The Family Next Door) is a Chilean telenovela created by José Ignacio Valenzuela. It was produced by the Chilean national channel Televisión Nacional de Chile and aired by the same channel from September 2010 through March 2011. It stars Álvaro Rudolphy, María Elena Swett, Jorge Zabaleta, Luz Valdivieso, and Cristián Arriagada. La Casa de al Lado (English – The House Next Door) is a remake of the original telenovela produced by the American Spanish-language network Telemundo.

The series revolves around two families that live next door to each other: the Fabres family and the Ruiz-Tagle family. Renato Fabres (Jaime Vadell) is a wealthy businessman, who lives a picturesque life with his family: his wife Eva Spencer (Coca Guazzini) and their three children Ignacia (Luz Valdivieso), Carola (Francisca Lewin), and Benjamín (Pablo Díaz). Meanwhile, their next door neighbors Javier Ruiz-Tagle (Jorge Zabaleta) and Pilar Echeñique (María Elena Swett), seem to also live a picturesque life with their children, Andrea (Constanza Piccoli) and Diego (Giovanni Carella). The arrival of Ignacia's new husband, Gonzalo Ibáñez (Álvaro Rudolphy), and the immediate attraction that flares between him and Pilar shakes everything up. Leonardo (Cristián Arriagada), the quadriplegic identical twin brother of Carola's late husband Hugo (also Cristián Arriagada), holds many secrets, including whether or not Hugo actually committed suicide. All the secrets the two families have will be revealed and everyone's lives will be forever altered.

== Plot ==
The series opens with the oldest Fabres daughter, Ignacia, marrying Gonzalo Ibáñez. Ignacia's first husband Hugo committed suicide a year earlier. Hugo's identical twin brother, Leonardo, is a quadriplegic and lives in the Fabres home. Through hints dropped by Leonardo, it appears that Hugo did not commit suicide and was actually murdered by Ignacia. Gonzalo finds himself unsettled by this revelation as well as the presence of Ignacia's unstable sister, Carola, her voyeuristic brother, Benjamin and strange occurrences in the house of Fabres.

Next door, Pilar Echeñique is in an unhappy marriage to her controlling husband, Javier Ruiz-Tagle. Pilar and Gonzalo form a bond and become attracted to each other. When Ignacia tells Gonzalo she is pregnant, he knows he is not the father, because he is infertile. It is revealed that Ignacia has been having an affair with Javier and he is the father. Ignacia later miscarries. Pilar and Gonzalo begin a passionate affair.

Another shocking revelation comes to light when it is shown that Hugo really did not commit suicide— he is still alive and is posing as Leonardo! Also, Hugo has not been working alone, his accomplice is none other than Gonzalo, who is actually his older brother. The three brothers' real names are Ismael (Hugo), Iván (Leonardo), and Iñigo (Gonzalo) Mora. When the three men were children, their mother had an affair with Renato and then their father, who worked at Renato's company, went to prison for financial crimes that were actually committed by Renato. Afterwards, the boys' mother abandoned them and they were brought up by their housekeeper. Gonzalo and Hugo decided to exact on revenge on the Fabres family for ruining their family. They decided to worm their way into the family, first by Hugo marrying Ignacia and then staging his own suicide by murdering Leonardo and taking his place, and then by Gonzalo also marrying Ignacia. Hugo has also been responsible for all strange occurrences in the Fabres home with his aim to drive Ignacia crazy.

== Cast ==
=== Main cast ===
Actor	Character	Known as
Álvaro Rudolphy	Gonzalo Ibáñez / Roberto Acosta Errázuriz (former alias) / Iñigo Mora Vergara (birth name)	son of Igor & Mabel, brother of Hugo & Leonardo, second husband of Ignacia, in love with Pilar
María Elena Swett	Pilar Echeñique	wife of Javier, mother of Andrea and Diego, in love with Gonzalo
Jorge Zabaleta	Javier Ruiz-Tagle	husband of Pilar, lover of Ignacia and Rebeca, father of Andrea and Diego
Luz Valdivieso	Ignacia Fabres	wife of Gonzalo, "widow" of Hugo, lover of Javier, daughter of Eva and Renato, sister of Carola and Benjamín
Cristián Arriagada	Hugo Acosta Errázuriz / Ismael Mora Vergara	son of Igor & Mabel, identical twin brother of Leonardo, brother of Gonzalo, first husband of Ignacia
Cristián Arriagada	Leonardo Acosta Errázuriz / Iván Mora Vergara	son of Igor & Mabel, identical twin brother of Hugo, brother of Gonzalo
Francisca Lewin	Carola Fabres	Daughter of Eva and Renato, sister of Ignacia and Benjamín
María José Illanes	Rebeca Echeñique	sister of Pilar, lover of Javier, in love with Matías
Coca Guazzini	Eva Spencer	wife of Renato, mother of Ignacia, Carola and Benjamín
Jaime Vadell	Renato Fabres	husband of Eva, father of Ignacia, Carola and Benjamín
Ana Reeves	Mabel Vergara	former wife of Igor, mother of Hugo, Leonardo, & Gonzalo, former lover of Renato
Pablo Díaz	Benjamín Fabres	son of Eva and Renato, brother of Ignacia and Carola, in love with Hilda
Antonia Santa María	Hilda González	maid for the Fabres family, in love with Benjamín, niece of Yolanda and Nibaldo
Maricarmen Arrigorriaga	Yolanda Sanhueza	housemaid for the Fabres family, wife of Nibaldo
Claudio Arredondo	Nibaldo González	driver of Renato, husband of Yolanda
Loreto Araya-Ayala	Karen Ortega	housemaid of the Ruiz-Tagle
Constanza Piccoli	Andrea Ruiz-Tagle	daughter of Pilar and Javier
Brian Luca Bacelli	Guido Maldonado	boyfriend of Andrea
Giovanni Carella	Diego Ruiz-Tagle	son of Pilar and Javier

=== Secondary cast ===
Actor	Character	Known as
Javiera Ramos	Carmen Salazar	biological mother of Carola
Luis Alarcón	Igor Mora	father of Hugo, Leonardo, & Gonzalo, former husband of Mabel
Emilio Edwards	Danilo Salas	employee of Hugo
Sandra O'Ryan	Judge	civil judge
Iñigo Urrutia	Matías Santa María	lawyer of Renato, lover of Eva, in love with Rebeca
Carmen Gloria Bresky	Rosa Munita Yen / Cecilia Avendaño	lover and accomplice of Hugo
Rommy Salinas	Lidia Román	friend of the Acosta family, former girlfriend of Hugo
Ana Luz Figueroa	Teresa Sandoval	nurse of Leonardo
Remigio Remedy	Ricardo Merino	former patient of Pilar who is obsessed with her

== Soundtrack ==
Singer and song	Characters	Actors
Camila Aléjate de mi	Gonzalo and Pilar	Álvaro Rudolphy and María Elena Swett
Enrique Iglesias Cuando Me Enamoro	Benjamín and Hilda	Pablo Diaz and Antonia Santa María
