= Patricio Achurra =

Chilean actor and politician

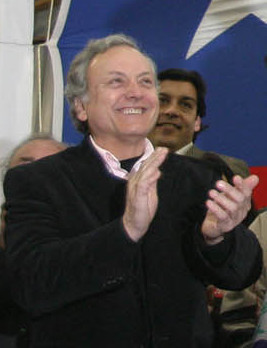
- Achurra in 2009
- Born: Patricio Achurra Garfias; February 3, 1948 (age 78); Santiago, Chile
- Occupations: Actor, politician
- Years active: 1970–present

Patricio Achurra Garfias (born February 3, 1948) is a Chilean actor and politician. A native of Santiago, he has been recognized for his roles in telenovelas such as J.J. Juez, La Colorina, La madrastra, and series such as Martín Rivas, among many others.

He was mayor of Paine from 2004 to 2008, backed by his party, the Christian Democratic Party. In 2012 he was elected councilor of the commune of Paine during the period 2012 to 2016.

His son is the actor Ignacio Achurra.

== Filmography ==
=== Telenovelas ===
Telenovelas
Year	Telenovela	Role	Channel
1975	María José	Alfredo	Canal 13
1975	J.J. Juez	Francisco Garmendia	Canal 13
1975	La otra Soledad	Eduardo	Canal 13
1976	Sol tardío	Rodolfo	TVN
1977	La colorina	Daniel Latorre	TVN
1981	La madrastra	Leonello Ibáñez	Canal 13
1983	La noche del cobarde	Raúl Villarrobles	Canal 13
1984	Andrea	Julián Arellano	Canal 13
1985	El prisionero de la media noche	Ramiro Saavedra	Canal 13
1985	La trampa	Alonso	Canal 13
1987	La última cruz	Abel Carrasco	Canal 13
1988	Vivir Así	Julián Cruchaga	Canal 13
1989	La intrusa	Rodrigo Estévez	Canal 13
1989	Bravo	Nelson	Canal 13
1990	Acércate más	Aníbal Lecaros	Canal 13
1991	Ellas por ellas	Jaime Munizaga	Canal 13
1992	Fácil de amar	Génaro	Canal 13
1993	Doble juego	Antonio Alzavía / Nicanor "El Toyo"	Canal 13
1994	Top secret	Arturo Rey	Canal 13
1995	El amor está de moda	Gonzalo	Canal 13
1995	Amor a domicilio	Sergio Toledo	Canal 13
1996	Adrenalina	Walter Opazo	Canal 13
1997	Playa Salvaje	Ricardo Aguirre	Canal 13
1998	Marparaíso	Enrique Santa Cruz	Canal 13
1999	Cerro Alegre	Clemente Echeverría	Canal 13
2003	16	Demetrio Alquinta	TVN
2005	17	Demetrio Alquinta	TVN
2011	Esperanza	Genaro Solovera	TVN
2012	Reserva de familia	Agustín Correa	TVN
2013	Solamente Julia	Gerardo García	TVN
2014	El amor lo manejo yo	José "Pepe" Fernández	TVN
2015	Dueños del paraíso	Orlando Olavarria	TVN
2015	Esa no soy yo	Ramón Marín	TVN
2017	Wena profe	Pedro Domínguez	TVN
2019	Pacto de sangre	Guillermo Sotomayor	Canal 13
2026	La baronesa	Roberto Márquez	Mega

=== TV Series ===
Serie de televisión
Year	Serie	Role	Channel
1979	Martín Rivas	Rafael San Luis	TVN
1979	Teatro... y en el teatro	Varios personajes	Corporación de Televisión de la Universidad de Chile
1982	Anakena	Agustín Ferrer	Canal 13
1990	Crónica de un hombre santo	Monseñor Francisco Alliende	Canal 13
1994	Fácil de amar, la comedia	Genaro	Canal 13
1996	Amor a domicilio, la comedia	Sergio toledo	Canal 13
1999	Los Cárcamo	Ricardo Aguirre	Canal 13
2002	El día menos pensado	Alfonso	TVN
2008	Teatro en Chilevisión	Varios personajes	Chilevisión
2011	12 días	Arturo Coloma	Chilevisión
2012	El diario secreto de una profesional	Álex Gurruchaga	TVN
2012	Vida por vida	Dr. Nano Davila	Canal 13
2012	BKN	Anselmo Costello	Mega
2013	Prófugos	Abogado	HBO
2017	Irreversible	Manuel Armijo	Canal 13
