= Papi Ricky =

- Title card
- Genre: Romance; Comedy drama
- Created by: Sebastian Arrau
- Directed by: Ítalo Galleani
- Creative director: Isabel Montecinos
- Starring: Jorge Zabaleta; Belén Soto; María Elena Swett; Tamara Acosta
- Opening theme: "Quiero una chica" by Latin Dreams
- Country of origin: Chile
- Original language: Spanish
- No. of episodes: 135

Production
- Executive producer: Veronica Saquel
- Producer: Marcelo Muñoz
- Production locations: Santiago, Chile
- Cinematography: Eduardo Alister
- Camera setup: Single camera
- Running time: 45-50 minutes
- Production company: Corporación de televisión de la Pontificia Universidad Católica de Chile

Original release
- Network: Canal 13
- Release: March 12 – October 1, 2007

Related
- Charly Tango; Lola; Papa Ricky (2017)

Papi Ricky is a Chilean telenovela that aired on Canal 13 in 2007. Created by Sebastián Arrau and directed by Ítalo Galleani, it tells the story of Ricardo, an unconventional single father to eight-year-old Alicia, who never knew her mother. The series stars Jorge Zabaleta and Belén Soto in the lead roles, as well as María Elena Swett and Tamara Acosta. The series first aired on 12 March 2007.

== Remake ==
Papi Ricky was remade as Papa Ricky in Malaysia by Global Station Sdn Bhd. Its last episode premiered on 5 May 2017.

== Cast ==
- Jorge Zabaleta as Ricardo "Ricky" Montes.
- María Elena Swett as Catalina Rivera.
- Belén Soto as Alicia Montes.
- Pablo Cerda as Greco Ovalle.
- Tamara Acosta as Colomba Chaparro.
- María Izquierdo as Blanca De la Luz.
- Silvia Santelices as Matilde Hormazábal.
- Juan Falcón as Antonio Noriega.
- Katty Kowaleczko as Úrsula Flores.
- Leonardo Perucci as Genaro Chaparro.
- Teresita Reyes as Olga Mía Cuevas.
- Luis Gnecco as Leonardo Garay.
- Ximena Rivas as Trinidad Azócar.
- Héctor Morales as Gabriel "Gabo" Del Río.
- Arantxa Uribarri as Macarena Garay.
- Carmen Barros as Julia "Julita" Merino.
- Jorge Yáñez as Segundo Marcos.
- Grimanesa Jiménez as Fresia Huaiquimán.
- Carmen Disa Gutiérrez as Filomena Mena.
- Julio Milostich as Renato Del Río.
- María Paz Grandjean as Dolores "Lola" Meléndez.
- César Caillet as Tomás Vidal.
- Antonia Santa María as María Paz Spencer.
- María José Illanes as Pascuala Chaparro.
- Mario Horton as Valentín Carrasco.
- Lorena Capetillo as Amparo Marcos.
- Sebastián Layseca as Vasco Marcos.
- Francisca Gavilán as Andrea Kuntz.
- Remigio Remedy as Adonis López.
- Alejandro Trejo as Máximo Tapia.
- Agustín Moya as Salvador Tapia.
- Manuel Antonio Aguirre as Ignacio "Nacho" Garay.
- José Tomás Guzmán as Luis "Luchín" Marcos.
- Gonzalo Schneider as Javier Noriega.
- Josefina Dumay as Minina Noriega.
- Colomba Dumay as Manana Noriega.

=== Special participations ===
- Magdalena Max-Neef as Gretel.
- Gabriela Medina as Manuela Pacheco
- Juan Pablo Miranda as Vladimir.
- Víctor Rojas as Don Ulises.
- Ariel Canale as Ciro.
- Loreto Moya as Clara.
- Paula Fernández as Celeste.
- Renato Münster as Flavio.
- Mariana Prat as Patricia, Greco's mother.
- Sergio Madrid as Judge Gabo home with Macarena.
- Margarita Barón as Giselle.
- Juan Carlos Cáceres as Sr. Spencer
- Patricio Ossa as Ricardo Montes (child).
- Sandra O'Ryan as Ema.
- Tichi Lobos as Solange.
- María José Bello as Ricky's mother (child).
- Gabriela Hernández as Lucía Cuevas (only shown in a photo)

== International release ==
- Chile: Canal 13 (2007) / RecTV (2014,2015-2016)
- Poland: Zone Romantica
- Hungary: Zone Romantica
- Israel: Viva
- Morocco: 2M TV
- Costa Rica: Canal 9
- Panama: Telemix Internacional
- United States: Latinoamérica Televisión
- Latin America: Canal 13 International
- Malaysia: Astro (2017) remake for Papa Ricky
