= El amor lo manejo yo =

- Genre: Romance; Drama
- Created by: Enrique Estevanez; Marcelo Nacci; Laura Barneix
- Written by: Guillermo Valenzuela; Benito Escobar; Florencia Martínez; Camilo Brodsky
- Directed by: Christian Maringer Cabañas
- Creative director: Alex Bowen
- Starring: María Elena Swett; Jorge Zabaleta; María Gracia Omegna; Diego Muñoz; Julio Jung Duvauchelle; Luz Valdivieso; Coca Guazzini; Antonia Santa María; Carmen Gloria Bresky; Osvaldo Silva; Rodrigo Muñoz
- Opening theme: Me gusta by Yotuel Romero
- Country of origin: Chile
- Original language: Spanish
- No. of episodes: 149

Production
- Executive producer: Eduardo Alegría Celaya
- Producer: Juan Carlos Asensio P.
- Running time: 30-45 minutes

Original release
- Network: TVN; TV Chile
- Release: March 24 – October 22, 2014

Related
- Somos Los Carmona; Caleta del Sol; Dulce amor (2012)

El amor lo manejo yo (English: I Will Drive This Love) is a 2014 Chilean telenovela produced and broadcast by TVN. Based on the Argentine telenovela Dulce amor.

== Cast ==
- Jorge Zabaleta as Marcos Guerrero
- María Elena Swett as Victoria Duque/Victoria Fernández
- Diego Muñoz as Julián Jiménez
- María Gracia Omegna as Natalia Duque
- Julio Jung Duvauchelle as Alonso García
- Luz Valdivieso as Laura Green
- Coca Guazzini as Elena Farias
- Patricio Achurra as José "Pepe" Fernández
- Loreto Valenzuela as Isabel Fuentes
- Carmen Gloria Bresky as Gabriela "Gaby" Ahumada
- Ignacio Achurra as Alcides "Máquina" Castro
- Antonia Santa María as Noelia Fernández
- Rodrigo Muñoz as Emilio Montes
- María Elena Duvauchelle as Rosa Prado
- Ariel Mateluna as Lucas Ramírez
- Margarita Hardessen as Valentina Duque
- Soledad Cruz as Rocío Guerrero
- Borja Velasco as Mariano "Nano" Jiménez
- Otilio Castro as Antonio Medina
- Osvaldo Silva as Sergio Montalbán
- Marcelo Valdivieso as Agustín Rensi

== Special cast ==
- Jorge Yañez as Hugo Bonifatti.
- Pedro Rivadeneira as Corredor de Autos.
- Patricio Andrade as Fermín.
- Sara Becker as Sara "Sarita" Medina.
- Ángela Prieto as Andrea Green.
- Gonzalo Robles as Waldo Guerrero.
- Juan Pablo Sáez as Nicky.
- Mónica Illanes as Cecilia.
- José Palma as Jimmy, novio de Natalia.
- Nicolás Pérez as Matías Schmidt.
- Fernando Olivares as Raúl.
- Max Meriño as Comisario.
- Andrés Arriola as Álvarez.
