= XS: The Worst Size =

- Theatrical release poster
- Directed by: Jorge López Sotomayor
- Screenplay by: Gonzalo Maza; Luis Ponce
- Based on: XS: The Worst Size by Sergio Gómez
- Produced by: Gustavo Valenzuela
- Cinematography: Sebastián Moreno; Ralf Oberti
- Edited by: Marcelo Zamora
- Music by: Nacho Mena
- Production company: JL Producciones de Cine y TV Ltda
- Release date: November 27, 2003
- Running time: 84 minutes
- Country: Chile
- Language: Spanish
- Budget: $300,000

XS: The Worst Size (Spanish: XS, la peor talla) is a 2003 Chilean comedy film directed by Jorge López Sotomayor and written by Gonzalo Maza & Luis Ponce. Based on the short story of the same name by Sergio Gómez, the film stars Benjamín Vicuña, Gonzalo Valenzuela and María Elena Swett. It premiered on November 27, 2003, in Chilean theaters.

The film started as a telefilm for the National Television series Cuentos Chilenos in 1999, but was later transformed into a theatrical feature film.

== Synopsis ==
Víctor is a teenager who, together with his group of classmates, represents the classic youngsters who stand out within the school. The messy and ticket-sellers, the prettiest and most exuberant whom everyone wants to conquer, her shy friend and 'El Maquina', a school bully, whom no one dares to contradict. The film shows how teenagers deal with their friends, peers and teachers, and the loneliness they face in the constant search for identity.

== Cast ==
The actors participating in this film are:

- Benjamín Vicuña as Víctor Camus
- Gonzalo Valenzuela as 'El Máquina' Miranda
- Nicolás Saavedra as Jalil
- María Elena Swett as Pamela
- Florencia Romero as Conny
- Cristóbal Tapia-Montt as Viñuela
- Álvaro Uccelletti as Caneo
- Domingo Guzmán as Matías
- Malucha Pinto as Rebeca Chávez
- Sandra Arriagada as Norris Girl
- Jaime Capó as Inspector Peñaloza
- Otilio Castro as Teacher
- Sebastián Dahm as Victor's dad
- Felipe Hurtado as Gunther
- Juan Luis León as Viñuela's brother
- Diego López as Johanssen
- Víctor Mix as Morales goalkeeper
- Eduardo Banchieri as Student

== Accolades ==
Year	Award / Festival	Category	Recipient	Result	Ref.
2003	Auburn International Film Festival	Best Youth Film	XS: The Worst Size	Won	
2004	Lebu International Film Festival	Audience Award - Best Chilean Film	XS: The Worst Size	Won	
2005	Cuenca International Film Festival	Best Actor	Benjamín Vicuña	Won	
