= Hijos del Monte =

- Title card
- Created by: Víctor Carrasco
- Developed by: TVN
- Directed by: María Eugenia Rencoret; Víctor Huerta; Camilo Sánchez
- Starring: María Elena Swett; Jorge Zabaleta; Francisco Pérez-Bannen; Mónica Godoy; Cristián Arriagada; Matías Oviedo; Andrés Reyes
- Country of origin: Chile
- Original language: Spanish
- No. of episodes: 131

Production
- Producers: Vania Portilla; Patricia Encina
- Production location: Santiago de Chile
- Camera setup: Multi-camera
- Running time: 23-25 minutes

Original release
- Network: TVN
- Release: September 2, 2008 – March 10, 2009

Related
- Viuda Alegre; Los Exitosos Pells; Belmonte; Los herederos del Monte La herencia, un legado de amor

Hijos del Monte (translated: Del Monte Sons) is a Chilean telenovela produced by TVN. It was written by Víctor Carrasco and directed by María Eugenia Rencoret. Filming began on June 18, 2008 and took place in the Santiago neighborhoods of Padre Hurtado and Isla de Maipo beside the TVN studios.

Two adaptations of this soap have been aired in 2011 and 2022.

== Plot ==
The series tells the story of the five del Monte brothers (from oldest to youngest): Juan, José, Pedro, Gaspar, and Lucas. The five men were all adopted by Emilio del Monte and his wife, Clarisa. Clarisa died from cancer a few years earlier and Emilio dies of a heart attack just before the series begins. The close-knit family live an easygoing life on their ranch. The Del Monte brothers' lives are abruptly changed with the arrival of their father's illegitimate daughter, Paula del Monte. Emilio left a portion of his estate to Paula, who wants to claim what is rightfully hers.

Paula and her mother, Sofía Cañadas, immediately cause disharmony among the brothers. Juan is upset but respects his fathers wishes, José does not want to share their inheritance, Pedro is indifferent to Paula, Gaspar is furious over his father's affair, while Lucas is the only one who fully accepts Paula into the family. There is an instant attraction between Juan and Paula, despite the fact that Juan is engaged to Julieta Millán. While Julieta's heart belongs to Juan, she also shares a connection with Pedro, who is madly in love with her. José has been having an affair with Beatriz Pereira, who is married to Efraín Mardones. It is revealed that José is the father Beatriz's son, Simón. Gaspar is in love with Lupe Mardones, who he has to sneak around with since her father, Eleuterio, disapproves of their relationship. Lucas flirts with Rosario, Julieta's sister, but also develops feelings for Paula.

Juan moves up his wedding to Julieta after they find out she is pregnant. Paula begs Juan not to marry Julieta and they sleep together. Pedro shows Julieta footage of Paula and Juan sleeping together, but she still goes through with the wedding. Sadly, Julieta suffers a miscarriage and she leaves Juan when she realizes he is in love with Paula. Julieta begins seeing Pedro and Juan begins seeing with Paula, but there is tension between the four. Eventually, Juan and Julieta reconcile.

Gustavo Valdés, an attorney of the Del Monte family, gets into a plane crash and tells José just before he dies that he is actually Paula's biological father. Jose blackmails Sofía with this information, saying he will not tell Paula if he gets a portion of her inheritance.

== Cast ==
=== Main cast ===
Actor	Character	Description
Jorge Zabaleta	Juan del Monte	Oldest of the five adopted sons of Emilio and Clarisa, in love with Paula and Julieta.
María Elena Swett	Paula del Monte	Daughter of Sofía and Gustavo (originally thought to be Emilio's daughter), in love with Juan, mother of his twin sons.
Francisco Pérez-Bannen	José del Monte	Second oldest of the five adopted sons of Emilio and Clarisa, biological father of Simon.
Mónica Godoy	Julieta Millan	Daughter of Miguel and Blanca, in love with Juan and Pedro.
Cristián Arriagada	Pedro del Monte	Third oldest of the five adopted sons of Emilio and Clarisa, in love with Julieta.
Matías Oviedo	Gaspar del Monte	Fourth oldest of the five adopted sons of Emilio and Clarisa, in love with Lupe, the only brother who was closer to his mother than his father.
Andrés Reyes	Lucas del Monte	Youngest of the five adopted sons of Emilio and Clarisa, biological son of Carmen, biological brother of Amador, in love with Rosario.
Coca Guazzini	Sofía Cañadas	Former mistress of Emilio, mother of Paula.
Jaime Vadell	Miguel Millan	Husband of Blanca, father of Julieta, Consuelo and Rosario.
Maricarmen Arrigorriaga	Blanca Cifuentes	Wife of Miguel, mother of Julieta, Consuelo and Rosario.
Fernanda Urrejola	Beatriz Pereira	Wife of Efraín, mother of Simon, in love with José.
Claudio Arredondo	Efraín Mardones	Son of Modesto, husband of Beatriz, legal father of Simon.
Celine Reymond / Begoña Basauri	Guadalupe "Lupe" Mardones	Daughter of Eleuterio, in love with Gaspar.
Fernando Farías	Modesto Mardones	Brother of Eleuterio, father of Efraín, butler of the Del Monte family.
Ana Reeves	Berta Soto	Maid of the Millan family, in love with Modesto.
Edgardo Bruna	Eleuterio Mardones	Brother of Modesto, father of Lupe.
Antonia Santa María	Consuelo Millan	Daughter of Miguel and Blanca, in love with Johnny.
Cristián Riquelme	Johnny Delgado	A worker for the Del Monte family, in love with Consuelo.
Juana Ringeling	Rosario Millan	Daughter of Miguel and Blanca, in love with Lucas.
Nicolás Poblete	Amador Cereceda	A worker for the Del Monte family, biological brother of Lucas.

=== Recurring cast ===
Actor	Character	Description
Luis Alarcón	Emilio del Monte	Husband of Clarisa, adoptive father of Juan, José, Pedro, Gaspar and Lucas, alleged biological father of Paula, died from a heart attack.
Gloria Canales	Carmen Cereceda	Mother of Amador, biological mother of Lucas.
Peggy Cordero	Clarisa Serrano	Wife of Emilio, adoptive mother of Juan, José, Pedro, Gaspar and Lucas, died from cancer.
Patricio Strahovsky	Gustavo Valdés	An attorney of the Del Monte family, biological father of Paula, dies in a plane crash.
