= Brujas (TV series) =

- Title card
- Genre: Comedy drama Mystery
- Created by: Néstor Castagno; Daniella Castagno
- Written by: Néstor Castagno; Daniella Castagno; Marcelo Castañon; Segio Diaz; Claudia Villaroel
- Directed by: Guillermo Helo; Ítalo Galleani
- Creative directors: Alfredo Barrios; Carlos Leppe
- Starring: Carolina Arregui; Jorge Zabaleta; María Elena Swett
- Opening theme: "Brujas" by Pedro Foneca
- Country of origin: Chile
- Original language: Spanish
- No. of episodes: 135

Production
- Executive producer: Verónica Saquel
- Producers: Marisol Morales; Javier Goldschmied
- Production location: Santiago
- Cinematography: Eduardo Alister
- Editors: Claudio Matus; Cristian Reyes
- Camera setup: Single camera
- Running time: 60-110 minutes
- Production company: Corporación de televisión de la Pontificia Universidad Católica de Chile

Original release
- Network: Canal 13
- Release: March 7 – August 23, 2005

Related
- Tentación; Gatas y tuercas; Las profesionales, a su servicio (2006)

Brujas (lit: Witches) also known as Las profesionales, is a Chilean television soap opera created by Néstor and Daniella Castagno, that aired on Canal 13 from March 7, to August 23, 2005, starring Carolina Arregui, Jorge Zabaleta and María Elena Swett.

== Cast ==
- Carolina Arregui as Beatriz González.
- Jorge Zabaleta as Dante Ruíz Salazar / Soler Morales / Fontaine Morales.
- María Elena Swett as Cassandra García.
- Juan Falcón as Jason Estévez.
- Íngrid Cruz as Gretel "Estrudel" Schmidt Kaussel.
- Elvira López as Candelaria Pérez "Candela".
- Antonella Ríos as Mariana Carvajal.
- Lorena Capetillo as Noelia Fuentes.
- Silvia Santelices as Rebeca Márquez.
- Leonardo Perucci as Humberto Fontaine.
- Loreto Valenzuela as Mercedes Salazar.
- Luis Gnecco as Leopoldo Quevedo.
- Solange Lackington as Marta "Martuca" Salinas.
- Alejandro Trejo as Gregorio "Goyo" Sánchez.
- Viviana Rodríguez as Josefina "Pepa" Altamirano.
- Guido Vecchiola as Benjamín Rivas.
- Teresita Reyes as Irene León.
- Elena Muñoz as Hilda Cruz.
- Magdalena Max-Neef as Montserrat Contreras.
- Víctor Rojas as Jack "Don Jack" Salinas.
- Gabriela Medina as Elizabeth Donoso.
- Julio Milostich as Fabián Mainardi.
- Paula Sharim as Angelina Contreras.
- Remigio Remedy as Enrique Monárdez.
- Gabriel Prieto as Emilio Arriagada.
- Fernando Gómez-Rovira as Manuel Arriagada.
- Carmen Gloria Bresky as María Inés "Nené" Fontecilla.
- Héctor Morales as Byron Brandon Sánchez.
- Antonia Santa María as Sharon Janet Sánchez.
- Mariana Derderián as Macarena Altamirano.
- Nicolás Poblete as Luciano Mainardi.
- Gabriel Sepúlveda as José Tomás Contreras.
- Muykuay Silva/Ivanna Tapia as Anastasia Mainardi.
- Salvador Sacur as Sebastián Arriagada Conteras.

=== Special participations ===
- Osvaldo Laport as Vicente Soler Marquez / Fontaine Marquez.
- María Elena Duvauchelle as Raquel Morales.
- Alfredo Allende as Pablo "Cocoliso" Ossa.
- Aldo Bernales as Chueco" Carmona.
- Verónica Santiago as Luz María.
- María Olga Matte as Javiera.
- Patricia Bustamante as Loreto.
- Annie Murath as Karla.
- Serge Francois Soto as Inspector Campos.
- Verónica González as Nancy.
- Rodrigo Fernández as José Mora Morales.
- Agustín Moya as Apostador.
- Tommy Rey as himself.

== Banda sonora ==
1. Pedro Foncea - Brujas (Tema principal)
2. Michael Bublé - Feeling Good (Tema de Don Humberto enamorado y con Mercedes)
3. Kalimba - No me quiero enamorar (Tema de Dante y Beatriz)
4. David Civera (Team Mekano) - Que la detengan (Tema de Beatriz)
5. Juanes - Volverte a ver (Tema de Gretel y Jason)
6. Azúcar Moreno - El (Tema incidental de Beatriz)
7. Ricardo Montaner - Tengo verano (Tema de Jason)
8. El Símbolo - Muévete así (Vicio) (Tema de Mariana)
9. Daddy Yankee - La gasolina (Tema de Byron)
10. Raffaella Carrà - Hay que venir al sur (Tema de baile de Candela)
11. Melvin Crema - Juego cruel (Tema de Fabián)
12. Alex Ubago - Cuanto antes (Tema de Gretel y Enrique)
13. Miguel Bosé - Teorema (Señora es usted) (Tema de Leopoldo cuando piensa en Beatriz)
14. Carlos Vives - Voy a olvidarme de mi (Tema de Marta y Gregorio Sa-sá)
15. María Isabel - Antes muerta que sencilla (Tema de las 5 Profesionales del Servicio)
16. Myriam Hernández - Mío (Tema de Beatriz cuando extraña a Dante)
17. La Sociedad - Quiero (Tema de Mariana y Byron)
18. Alejandro Sanz - Tu no tienes alma (Tema de Josefina "Pepa")
19. Aldo Ranks - Mueve mami (Tema de Sharon Janet)
20. Laura Canoura - Casandra (Tema de Casandra)
21. Chayanne - Caprichosa (Tema de Casandra y Dante)
22. Azul Caribe - Con las manos arriba (Tema incidental)
23. Kudai - Sin despertar (Tema de Manuelito)
24. Ricardo Arjona - Mujeres (Tema incidental)
25. Los Tigres del Norte - La manzanita (Tema de Doña Irene y Don Jack)
26. Belinda - Vivir (Tema de Macarena)
27. Christian Castro - Te buscaría (Tema de Angelina y Enrique)
28. Alejandro Sanz y Lena Burke - Tu corazón (Tema de Noelia y Benjamín)
29. Sin Bandera - Mientes tan bien (Tema de Casandra y Dante enamorados)
30. Marta Sánchez - Profundo valor (Tema de Beatriz cuando esta triste)
31. La Sonora de Tommy Rey - Los domingos (la peineta) (Tema en las fiestas de la Familia Sa-sá)
32. Juanes - Camisa negra (Tema de Jason)

== International broadcasts ==
- Venezuela: RCTV
- Argentina: El Trece
- Ecuador: Teleamazonas
- United States: Latinoamérica Televisión
- Russia: TNT
- Costa Rica: Teletica
- Uruguay: Saeta TV Canal 10
- Peru: Panamericana Televisión
- Panama: Televisora Nacional
- Israel: Viva Platina
- Honduras: Canal 4
