= Ana Reeves =

Chilean actress

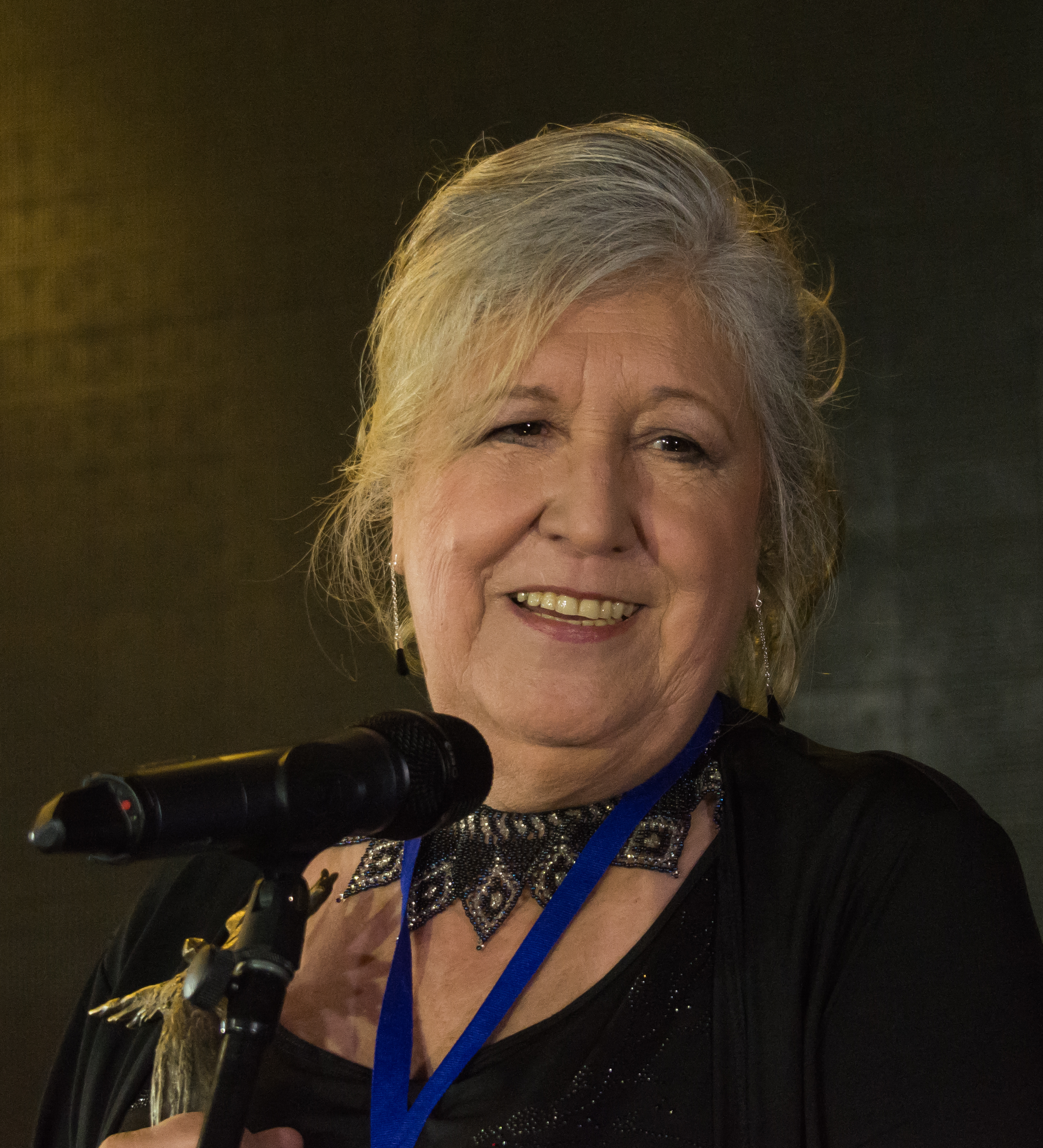
- Born: Ana Reeves Salinas; December 22, 1948 (age 77); Santiago de Chile, Chile
- Occupation: Actress

Ana Reeves Salinas (born December 22, 1948), best known as Anita Reeves, is a Chilean television, film and theatre actress and occasional theatre director. In 2004 Reeves received the APES (Asociación de Periodistas de Espectáculos) prize for "Best Comedian Actress" owing to her role in the telenovela Versus. In 2008 she received a tribute to her career on the III Festival Nacional e Internacional Teatro La Olla. In 2010, in the Pedro Sienna Awards she received the prize for "Best Supporting Actress Performance" for the film The Maid.

== Television ==
TV series
Year	Title	Roles	Channel
1972	La sal del desierto	Rita	TVN
1982	Bienvenido Hermano Andes	Yolanda Villaroel	Canal 13
1983	Las Herederas	Brígida	Canal 13
1984	La Represa	Lucy Velero	TVN
1984	La Torre 10	Blanca Menares	TVN
1985	Morir de amor	Magdalena Suárez	TVN
1988	Semidiós	Rosario	Canal 13
1988	Vivir así	Adriana	Canal 13
1989	A la sombra del ángel	Alina	TVN
1990	El milagro de vivir	Danna	TVN
1991	Volver a empezar	Lorenza	TVN
1992	Trampas y caretas	Leticia	TVN
1993	Jaque Mate	Elvira of Tapia	TVN
1993	Ámame	Rossy	TVN
1994	Rompecorazón	Corina Parraguéz	TVN
1995	Estúpido Cupido	Hermana Rebeca	TVN
1996	Sucupira	Carmen of Campos	TVN
1997	Tic Tac	Victoria Grant	TVN
1998	Iorana	Minerva Barros	TVN
1998	Mi abuelo, mi nana y yo	Tía Bartolina	TVN
1998	Borrón y Cuenta Nueva	Evangelina Cruz	TVN
1999	Aquelarre	Chela Ponce	TVN
2000	Santoladrón	Leticia of Palma	TVN
2001	Amores de Mercado	Alicia "Pastora" Rubilar	TVN
2002	Purasangre	Apolonia Soto	TVN
2003	Pecadores	Gloria Torres	TVN
2004	Los Pincheira	Madre Superiora	TVN
2004	Destinos Cruzados	Emma Tapia	TVN
2005	Versus	Enriqueta Dolores of Vergara	TVN
2006	Floribella	Nilda "Memé" of Santillán	TVN
2007	Amor por Accidente	Luciana Hinojosa	TVN
2008	Hijos del Monte	Berta Soto	TVN
2009	Los Ángeles de Estela	Lina Lumbrera	TVN
2009	Mi bella genio	Salomé	TVN
2010	La familia de al lado	Mabel Vergara	TVN
2011	12 días que estremecieron a Chile	Berta	CHV
2013	Infieles	Olga	CHV
2013	Lo que callamos las mujeres	Sonia	CHV
2013	Bim Bam Bum	Miriam Nassiff	TVN
2015	Los años dorados	Dolores Peña	UCV
2015	Fabulosas flores	Manuela Flores	La Red
2017	Lo que callamos las mujeres	Yolanda	CHV
2017	Vidas en riesgo	María	CHV
2017	Wena profe	Marta Contreras	TVN

== Films ==
Films
Year	Title	Director
1972	Operación alfa	Enrique Urteaga
1999	Last Call	Christine Lucas
1999	The Sentimental Teaser	Cristián Galaz
2005	El tiempo que quieran	Pedro Ayala
2008	Freezer	Valentina Berstein
2008	Mansacue	Marco Enríquez-Ominami
2009	The Maid	Sebastián Silva
2014	Desastres naturales	Bernardo Quesney
2017	And Suddenly the Dawn	Silvio Caiozzi
2017	Se busca novio... para mi mujer	Diego Rougier
2018	The Sutherland School	Iñaki Velasquez
