= Los Ángeles de Estela =

- Title card for Los ángeles de Estela
- Genre: Serial drama
- Written by: Hugo Morales; Andrés Telias; Carlos Galofré; Diego Muñoz; Carla Stagno
- Directed by: Rodrigo Velásquez; Nicolás Alemparte
- Starring: María Elena Swett; Jorge Zabaleta; Coca Guazzini; Francisco Pérez-Bannen; Cristián Arriagada
- Opening theme: "Mentia" by Miranda!
- Country of origin: Chile
- Original language: Spanish
- No. of seasons: 1
- No. of episodes: 121

Production
- Executive producer: María Eugenia Rencoret
- Producers: Vania Portilla; Patricia Encina
- Production locations: Santiago, Chile

Original release
- Network: TVN
- Release: September 22, 2009 – March 19, 2010

Los ángeles de Estela (lit: Estela's Angels) is a Chilean comedy-drama television series that originally aired on TVN and TV Chile from September 22, 2009, to March 19, 2010, starring, María Elena Swett, Jorge Zabaleta, Coca Guazzini, Francisco Pérez-Banenn and Cristián Arriagada.

== Plot ==
Everything spins around Estela Cox (Coca Guazzini), a successful entrepreneur, but at the same time a very cold tempered woman, willing to do anything to achieve her goals. On the other side, Margarita (María Elena Swett), daughter of the servant and the husband of the powerful Estela, a man that by the way has died in strange circumstances.

On a particular day León (Jorge Zabaleta), Emilio (Cristián Arriagada) and Danilo (Francisco Pérez-Bannen), who have one of the most prosperous business in the city, see how their projects fall hard to the ground, when an accident ends the life of the restaurant where they had invested all their valuables.

Without financial support, without work, and thinking about how they are going to start over, they receive an offer to transform themselves into hair-dressers for a well known beauty parlor. León, Danilo and Emilio do not understand much about the business, but they do understand that the money they will make will help them reconstruct their lives and put some life back in their restaurant.

Estela Cox (Coca Guazzini), the owner of the place helps them accomplish their tasks at the beauty parlor: a "Voice" will be instructing their every move –by means of a small transmitter– every step of the way, how to handle clients, how to treat them, and what style to apply to each and every one of them. Then everyone will want to know who is this "Voice", and why she lives in hiding and does not show her face.

== Cast ==
=== Main characters ===
- María Elena Swett as Margarita Bobadilla / Margarita Alcázar.
- Coca Guazzini as Agetilde Rocha / Estela Cox.
- Jorge Zabaleta as León Inostroza / León Urmeneta.
- Francisco Pérez-Bannen as Danilo Escobar.
- Cristián Arriagada as Emilio Palacios.

=== Supporting characters ===
- Begoña Basauri as Laura Alcázar.
- Paola Volpato as Paloma Subercaseaux.
- Mariana Derderián as Alejandra Andrade.
- Ana Reeves as Lina Lumbrera.
- Maricarmen Arrigorriaga as Pola Amunátegui.
- Claudio Arredondo as Samuel Rocha.
- Renata Bravo as Nicole Wilkinson.
- Cristián Riquelme as Mario Bobadilla.
- Katyna Huberman as Tania Abarzúa.
- Montserrat Prats as Sandra Vilchés.
- Christián Sève as Felipe de la Vega.
- Juanita Ringeling as Lourdes Ríos.
- María José Illanes as Pilar Romero.
- Lucas Saez Collins as Teodoro Palacios.
- Catalina Castelblanco as Dakota Robinson.
- Camila Comnentz as Molly Robinson.
- Edgardo Bruna as Máximo Alcázar.
- Luis Wigdorsky as Alberto Bobadilla.
