= Silvia Santelices =

Chilean actress

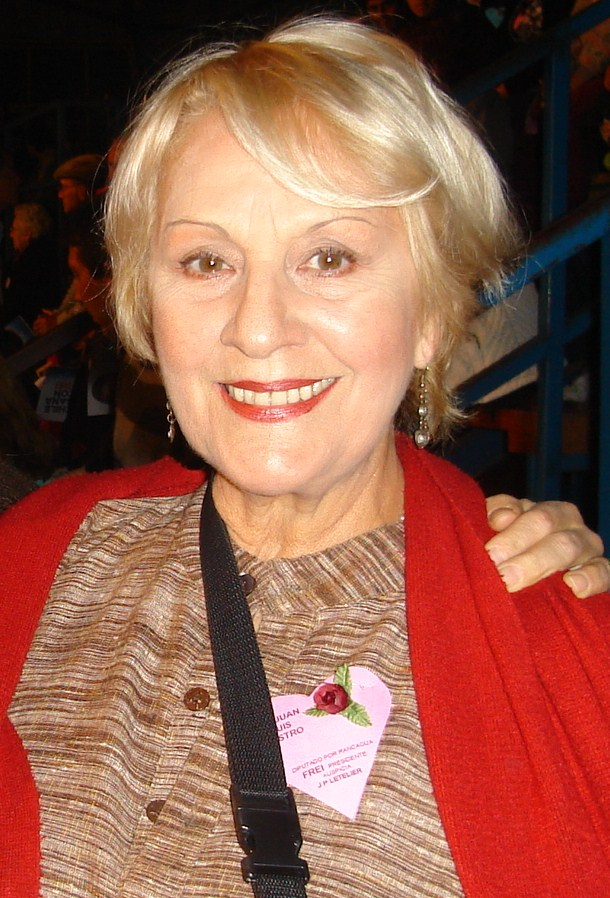
- Santelices in 2009
- Born: 27 June 1940 (age 86); Santiago, Chile
- Education: Catholic University of Chile
- Occupations: Actress, politician
- Years active: 1967–present
- Political party: Socialist
- Spouse: Jaime Schneider (divorced)
- Children: Valeria Schneider

Silvia Elena Santelices Rojas (born 27 June 1940) is a Chilean theater, film, and television actress, a pioneer of telenovelas in her country. She currently serves as councilor for the commune of Rancagua.

== Professional career ==
In 1960 Santelices entered the Catholic University of Chile to study theater. While still a student, she joined the nascent dramatic department of her alma mater's television station, Canal 13, where she initially participated in televised plays. In 1967 she was part of the cast of the first telenovela shot in Chile, Los días jóvenes, in which she shared the screen with actors such as Mirella Latorre, Mario Rodríguez, and Leonardo Perucci.

During the 1980s and 90s Santelices participated in numerous soap operas on Canal 13 and TVN, most notably La madrastra (1981), Los títeres (1984), and Fuera de control (1999). She also played Lucia Solar, mother of Teresa of the Andes (played by Paulina Urrutia) in TVN's miniseries Teresa de los Andes (1989).

After years of absence from television, in 2005 she participated in the television series Brujas, and has joined other dramatic productions such as Papi Ricky and Veinteañero a los 40.

She is known for having a great stage presence, characteristic smooth voice, and great interpretive power. Since the late 1990s she has lived in the city of Rancagua, where she is part of Casa del Arte Theater Company.

== Political career ==
In the 1970s Santelices was a supporter of Popular Unity. The 1973 coup d'état took her by surprise in Venezuela, where she was exiled for five years.

She was elected councilor of Rancagua in the municipal elections of 2008 on behalf of the Socialist Party. In the 2012 elections she returned to obtain a seat on the Municipal Council of Rancagua, receiving 4,533 votes, corresponding to 6.38%, obtaining the third communal majority.

== Telenovelas ==
Year	Title	Role	Channel
1967	Los días jóvenes	Ignacia Duarte	Canal 13
1981	La madrastra	Felisa Morán	Canal 13
1982	De cara al mañana	Isabel Valverde	TVN
1982	Alguien por quien vivir	Cecilia Sonnenberg	Canal 13
1983	La noche del cobarde	Estela Diez	Canal 13
1984	Los títeres	Eva Chacón	Canal 13
1985	Morir de amor	Lía Narváez / Leonora Di Lauro	TVN
1986	La Villa	Ximena Larralde	TVN
1988	Vivir así	Clara Wilson	Canal 13
1989	A la sombra del ángel	Eliana Riesling	TVN
1990	El milagro de vivir	Silvia Montané	TVN
1991	Volver a empezar	Adriana Miraflores	TVN
1993	Doble juego	Dolores "Lolo" Alzavía	Canal 13
1995	Juegos de fuego	Gloria Cox	TVN
1996	Loca piel	Irene Claro	TVN
1999	Fuera de control	Kimberly Seymour	Canal 13
2005	Brujas	Rebeca Márquez	Canal 13
2007	Papi Ricky	Matilde Hormazábal	Canal 13
2012	Reserva de familia	Amelia Correa	TVN
2016	Veinteañero a los 40	Ester Lynch	Canal 13

== Other TV series ==
Year	Title	Role	Channel
1967	Esa mujer eres tú	Lucila	Canal 13
1967	Amalia	Manolita Rozas	Canal 13
1968	El socio	Loreto	Canal 13
1970	Martín Rivas, 1970	Leonor Encina	TVN
1970	Cuartetos para instrumentos de muerte	Natalia Klavitz	TVN
1979	Martín Rivas, 1979	Adelaida Molina	TVN
1989	Teresa de los Andes	Lucía Solar	TVN
2005	La Nany	Yolanda "Yoli" Tapia	Mega
2015	Los años dorados	Josefa "Pepa"	UCV
