= Coca Guazzini =

Chilean actress

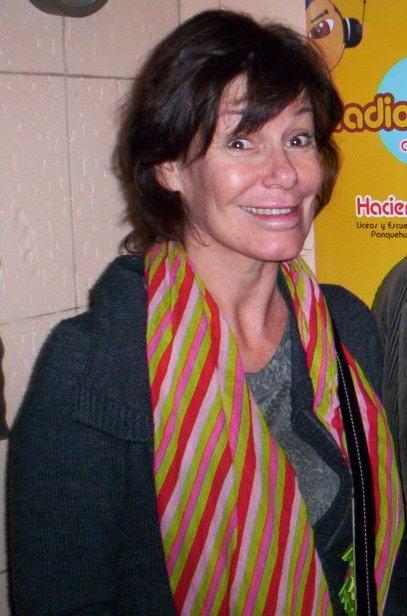
- Coca Guazzini in 2005
- Born: Silvia Beatriz Guazzini Monsalve; December 22, 1953 (age 72); Santiago, Chile
- Occupation: Actress

Silvia Beatriz Guazzini Monsalve (born December 22, 1953, in Santiago), best known as Coca Guazzini, is a Chilean television, theatre and film actress. Guazzini studied theatre at Universidad de Chile. She appeared in some popular Chilean telenovelas like Sucupira, Aquelarre and Tic Tac, in addition to participating in comedy programs such as De chincol a jote. In 2002 Coca Guazzini won the Apes Award for "Best Actress".

One of her most recognized roles is Pía Correa Gumucio, of the comedy show Los Eguiguren.

== Filmography ==
=== Films ===
- 1990, Viva el Novio.
- 2004, La Sagrada Familia as Soledad.
- 2004, De Película.
- 2005, Padre Nuestro.
- 2005, Play as Laura.
- 2006, Rojo, la película as Susana.
- 2007, Normal con Alas
- 2013, Gloria
- 2016, Rara as Icha.

Soap Opera and television credits
Year	Title	Role	Notes
1981	La Madrastra	Hortencia	Soap Opera
1982	Alguien por Quien Vivir	Graciela	Soap Opera
1982	Una Familia Feliz	Paula	Television series
1983	Las Herederas	Teresa Rodríguez	Soap Opera
1993	Ámame	Eugenia Hernández	Soap Opera
1994	Rompecorazón	Elena Montaner	Soap Opera
1996	Sucupira	Luisa Lineros	Soap Opera
1996	La Buhardilla	Tsa tsa	Television series
1997	Tic Tac	Ivana Gabor	Soap Opera
1998	Borrón y Cuenta Nueva	Magnolia "Maggie" Morán	Soap Opera
1999	Aquelarre	Elena Vergara	Soap Opera
2000	Santoladrón	Lucrecia Smith	Soap Opera
2001	Amores de Mercado	Morgana Atal	Soap Opera
2002	Te llamabas Rosicler		Television film
2002	Purasangre	Josefina López	Soap Opera
2003	Pecadores	Amelia Soto	Soap Opera
2004	Destinos Cruzados	Flavia Mendrano	Soap Opera
2005	Versus	América Gumucio	Soap Opera
2006	Floribella	María Laura "Malala" Torres	Soap Opera
2007	Amor por Accidente	Rebeca Malbrán	Soap Opera
2008	Hijos Del Monte	Sofía Cañadas	Soap Opera
2009	Los Ángeles de Estela	Estela Cox	Soap Opera
2010	La Familia de al lado	Eva Spencer	Soap Opera
2011	Aquí Mando Yo	Rocío Leighton	Soap Opera
2012	Separados	María Isabel Correa	Soap Opera
2014	El Amor Lo Manejo Yo	Elena Duque	Soap Opera

=== TV shows ===
- 1982, Sábado Gigante as Pía Correa Gumucio.
- 1987-1991, De chincol a jote, various characters.
- 1992, Jaguar Yu
