= Mariana Derderián =

Chilean actress (born 1980)

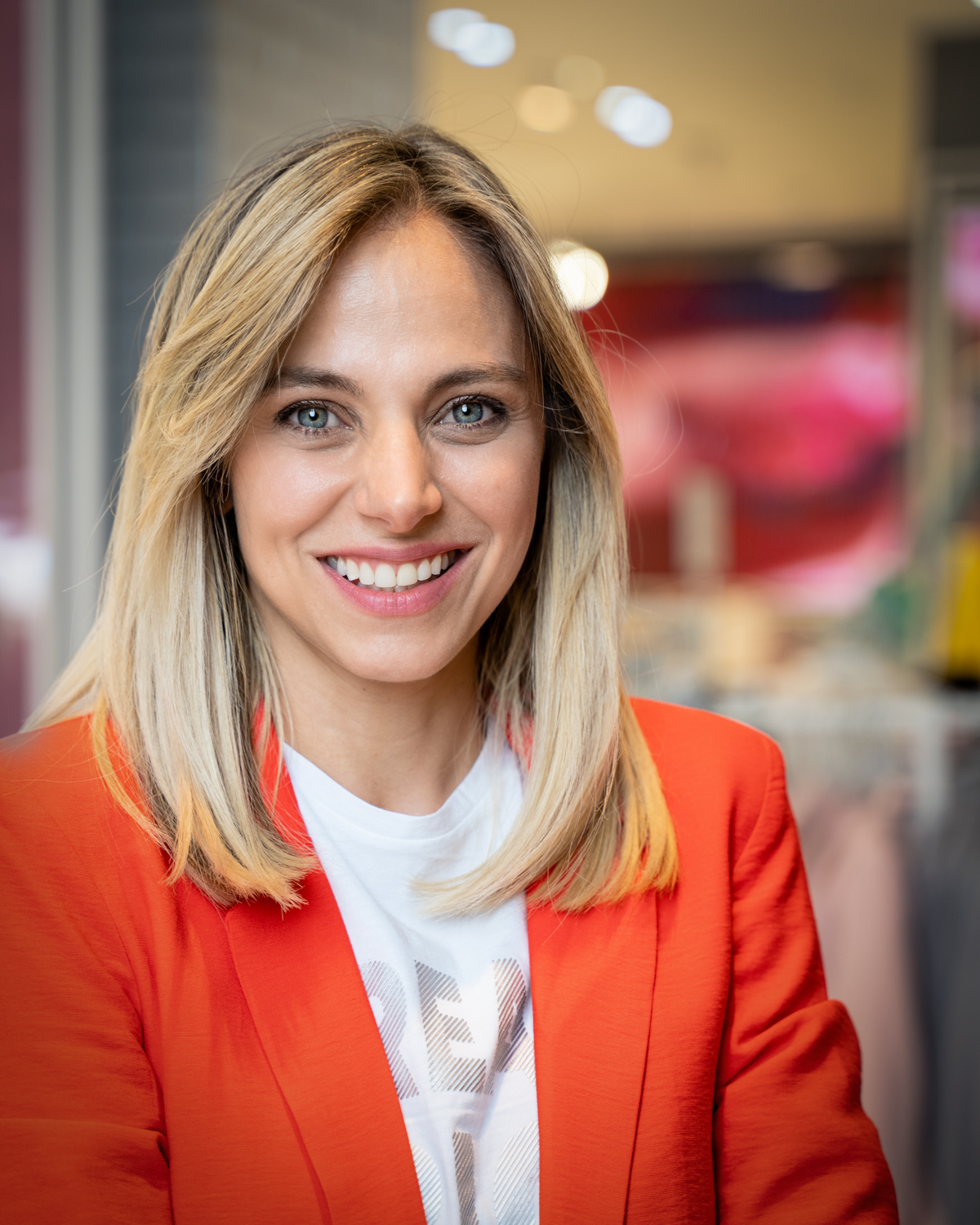
- Born: Mariana Derderian; January 15, 1980 (age 46); Caracas, Venezuela
- Occupation: Actress

Mariana Sirvat Derderián Espinoza (born January 15, 1980) is a Chilean actress and television presenter. She is best known for her roles as the protagonist in Chilean adaptations of TV series such as Floribella and I Dream of Jeannie.

== Biography ==
Mariana Derderián was born in Caracas, Venezuela, daughter of Chilean Armenian parents. She arrived in Chile in the early 1990s with her older sister. She accomplished her secondary studies in San Pedro Nolasco school in the community of Vitacura, and then was accepted at the Universidad Mayor to study business engineering. During her third year of study, Mariana found out that her professional vocation was the theatre and decided to take evening workshop, first in the municipalities of Vitacura and Las Condes, and then in the Academy of Fernando González.

At the end of 2004, Derderián and a classmate showed up at an audition at Canal 13, where she got selected to participate in the TV series Brujas where she interpreted Macarena Altamirano, an emotional immature girl, hardheaded, flirty, happy, innocent and very good friend, that falls in love with Byron, the role interpreted by Héctor Morales.

Mariana egressed of the University and started with the recordings, that combined with the elaboration of her thesis. After Brujas, Derderián participated in the TV series Gatas & Tuercas. On that production, she had a minor role as Carolina "Caco" Ulloa. Derderián finished her thesis and obtained her professional title.

In 2006 she starred in Floribella, and she appeared in Los ángeles de Estela in 2009. In 2009 she was given the lead role in the Chilean version of I Dream of Jeannie.

On May 8, 2024, Derderian and her two children were in their home in Vitacura (Greater Santiago), when a fire started in her son Pedro's room. Derderian and her daughter Laura evacuated the property, but the son died as a result of the smoke, apparently the fire started due to an electrical overload (the residence had been without power since the previous day due to the unusual snow blizzard). The children's father, and former partner of Mariana, journalist Francisco Aravena, suffered serious burns trying to save his son

== Filmography ==
=== Movies ===
- Scrambled Beer (2007) - Mónica
- Ella es Cristina (2019)

=== Telenovelas (TV series) ===
- Hippie (Canal 13, 2004)
- Brujas (Canal 13, 2005) - Macarena Altamirano
- Gatas y Tuercas (Canal 13, 2005) - Carolina 'Caco' Ulloa
- Floribella (TVN, 2006) - Florencia González
- Amor por accidente (TVN, 2007) - Britney Urrutia
- Los Ángeles de Estela (TVN, 2009) - Alejandra Andrade
- Decibel 110 (Mega, 2011)
- Mamá Mechona (Canal 13, 2013)
- La Chúcara (TVN, 2014)

=== Series & Unitarios ===
- El Día Menos Pensado (El cuadro) (TVN, 2007) - Valentina
- I Dream of Jeannie
- Mi Cooking Therapy
- La Jauría
