= Constanza Piccoli =

Chilean actress and singer

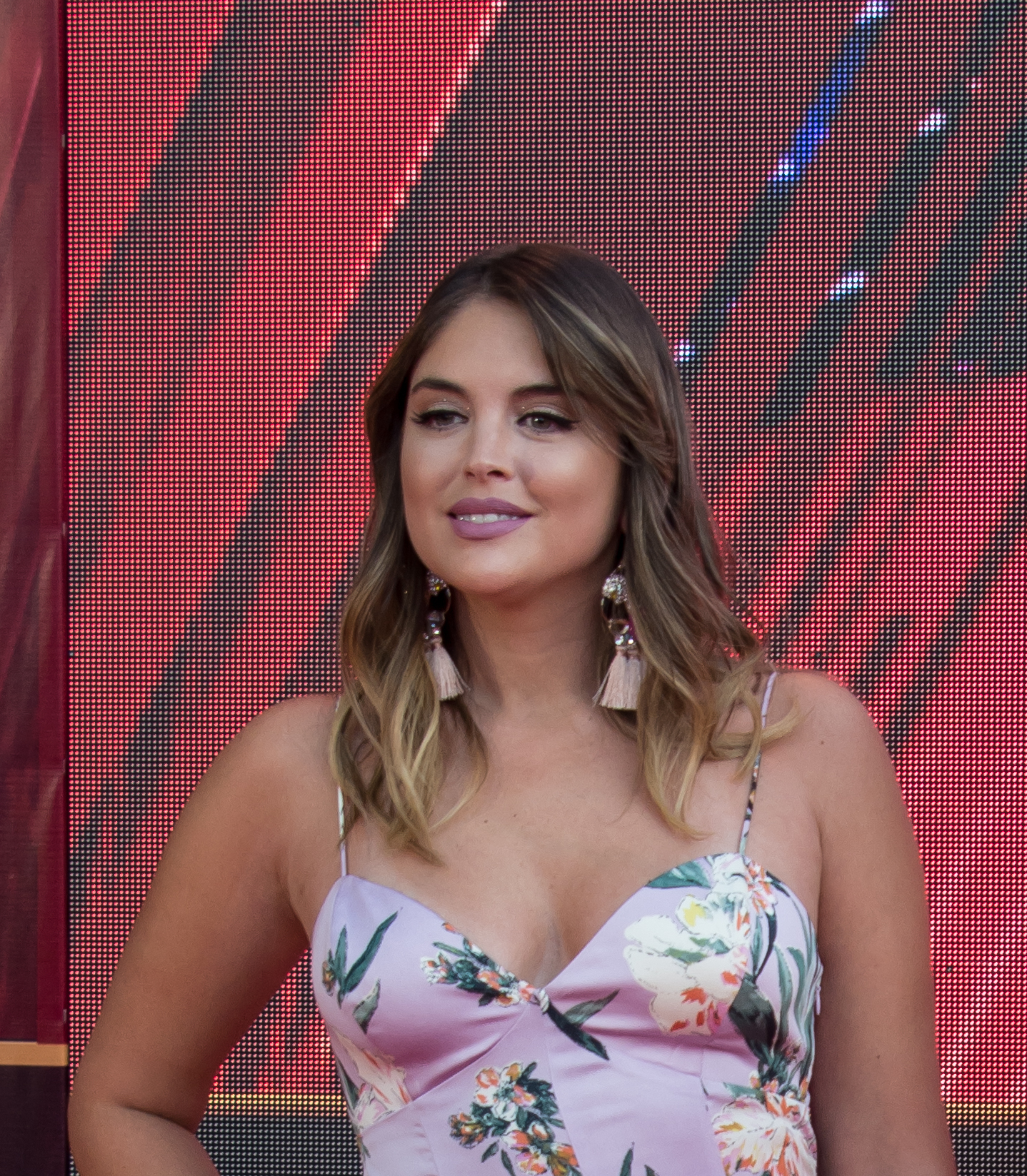
- Constanza Piccoli in the Copihue de Oro awards of 2018.
- Born: Constanza Patricia Piccoli Molina; 29 November 1992 (age 33); Santiago, Chile
- Other names: Conni Piccoli
- Occupations: Actress and singer
- Years active: since 2002
- Spouse: Nicolás Achá (m. 2021)

Constanza Patricia Piccoli Molina (19 November 1992), also known as Coni Piccoli, is a Chilean actress and singer, who became known in Mega's children's series BKN and later in Karkú, aired by TVN and Nickelodeon. She has also been part of the cast of several telenovelas such as La familia de al lado and Aquí mando yo, among others.

== Trajectory ==
At the age of eleven she made her television debut in the children's series BKN on Mega. She played as Catalina Valdivieso in 4 seasons, broadcast between 2004 and 2005, also in 2009 as a guest and also with a soundtrack with three albums. In December 2005 she left the series in which her character moved to Spain, so in 2006 she had to be replaced by Vesta Lugg (Brenda) and Paulina Prohaska (Antonia) who had already replaced Alberto Herrera (Jota) in season 3 of BKN.

She left the series by the end of 2005 due to an offer from the production company My Friend to star in Karkú, a production that would be BKN's competitor. It premiered in 2007 on TVN and the following year on Nickelodeon. It had three seasons and a band integrated by the same actors called Six Pack.

As part of Six Pack, she recorded two albums. The first one includes the songs Cada vez and Chico malo, which were widely played in Chilean radio stations. They were winners at the MTV Latin America Awards as Best New Artist Center and performed at the Viña del Mar Festival in 2008.

She had a short solo career, with three singles released, Eres el culpable, Arena & Mar and Sabes.

In 2010 she signed a contract with TVN to join their dramatic area and later on she was part of the cast of the TV series La familia de al lado. Then she was in Aquí mando yo and Dos por uno of the same channel. In 2014 she migrated to Canal 13 to play Millaray in Mamá mechona.

== Filmography ==
=== Movies ===
Year	Movie	Role	Director
2016	Prueba de actitud	Samantha María Tello Tapia	Fabrizio Copano

=== Telenovelas ===
Year	Teleseries	Role	Channel
2010	La familia de al lado	Andrea Ruiz-Tagle	TVN
2011	Aquí mando yo	Isabel Grez	TVN
2013	Dos por uno	Aurora Salinas	TVN
2014	Mamá Mechona	Millaray Valdebenito	Canal 13
2016	Veinteañero a los 40	Nicole Basáez	Canal 13

=== Series ===
Year	Series	Role	Channel
2004-2005, 2009	BKN	Catalina Valdivieso	Mega
2007-2009	Karkú	Emilia Valdés	TVN

== Television programs ==
- Calle 7 (TVN, 2011) – Guest
- Buenos Días a Todos, (TVN, 2009) – Guest
- Pollo en Conserva, (La Red, 2011) – Guest
- Alfombra Roja, (Canal 13, 2014) – Guest
- Alfombra Roja, En Viña, (Canal 13, 2014) – Guest
- Bienvenidos, (Canal 13, 2014) – Guest
- Vértigo (Canal 13, 2014) – Participant
- Rojo, el color del talento (TVN, 2018) – Backstage Conductor

== Discography ==
=== Studio albums ===
With BKN

- 2004: BKN
- 2004: La amistad sigue creciendo
- 2005: Lo mejor de/The best of

With SixPack

- 2007: SixPack
- 2008: SixPack (Reissue, only available online)
- 2009: Up
