= Machos (TV series) =

- Title card
- Genre: Drama
- Created by: Sebastián Arrau; Coca Gómez; Pablo Illanes
- Directed by: Herval Abreu
- Creative director: Carlos Leppe
- Starring: Héctor Noguera; Liliana Ross; Cristián Campos; Carolina Arregui; Rodrigo Bastidas; Felipe Braun; Jorge Zabaleta; Gonzalo Valenzuela; Diego Muñoz; Pablo Díaz
- Opening theme: "Machos" by Victor Flores
- Country of origin: Chile
- Original language: Spanish
- No. of episodes: 163

Production
- Executive producer: Verónica Saquel
- Producer: Marisol Morales
- Production location: Viña del Mar
- Camera setup: Single camera
- Running time: 60-90 minutes

Original release
- Network: Canal 13
- Release: March 10 – October 23, 2003

Related
- Buen partido; Hippie; Machos (2005)

Machos (lit: Males) is a Chilean television series which aired on Canal 13 from March 10, to October 23, 2003. The series was created by Sebastián Arrau, Coca Gómez, and Pablo Illanes and directed by Herval Abreu.

== Cast ==
- Héctor Noguera as Ángel Mercader
- Liliana Ross as Valentina Fernández
- Cristián Campos as Alonso Mercader
- Carolina Arregui as Sonia Trujillo
- Rodrigo Bastidas as Armando Mercader
- Felipe Braun as Ariel Mercader
- Jorge Zabaleta as Álex Mercader
- Gonzalo Valenzuela as Adán Mercader
- Diego Muñoz as Amaro Mercader
- Pablo Díaz as Antonio Mercader
- María Elena Swett como Fernanda Garrido
- María José Prieto as Mónica Salazar
- Viviana Rodríguez as Consuelo Valdés
- Maricarmen Arrigorriaga as Estela Salazar
- Alejandro Castillo as Fanor Cruchaga
- Solange Lackington as Josefina Urrutia
- Adriana Vacarezza as Isabel Füller
- Íngrid Cruz as Belén Cruchaga
- Juan Pablo Bastidas as Benjamín Cruchaga
- Aranzazú Yankovic as Úrsula Villavicencio
- Renato Münster as Pedro Pablo Estévez
- Berta Lasala as Pilar Ponce
- Teresita Reyes as Imelda Robles
- Marcela Medel as Clemencia Ríos
- Mariana Loyola as Soraya Salcedo
- Sergio Silva as Lucas Farfán
- Carolina Varleta as Kiara Salazar
- Lorena Capetillo as Madona Ríos
- Sebastián Arancibia as Nicolás Ponce
- José Jiménez as Andrés "Andresito" Mercader
- Elvira López as Alicia Mercader Robles
- Nelly Meruane as Mirna Robles
- María Elena Duvauchelle as Bernarda Bravo
- Teresa Munchmeyer as Tía Chita Reyes
- Antonella Ríos as Yolanda "Yoly" Salcedo
- Cristián Guzmán as Gustavo Heredia
- Macarena Teke as Manuela Silva
- Felipe Hurtado as Ignacio "Nacho" Ossa
- Paulina de la Paz as María José "Cachorra" González
- Leonardo Álvarez as Diego Bernales
- Constanza González as Cristina
- Rosa Ramírez as Jacinta Montero
- Fernando Gómez-Rovira as René Sandoval
- Emilio García as Sammy

=== Special participations ===
- Catherine Mazoyer as Paula Jiménez (Álex's lawyer)
- Alejandro Trejo as Víctor Benavides
- Pedro Vicuña as Carlos Garrido
- Coca Rudolphy as Ema Salinas de Garrido
- Remigio Remedy as Raimundo Fernández
- Pamela Villalba as Tatiana Romero
- Óscar Garcés as Kevin "Chino" Heredia
- Sebastián Dahm as Javier Coccolo
- Rubén Darío Guevara as Joaquín Fernández
- Francisca Márquez as Clarita Manríquez
- Arturo Ruiz-Tagle as Mauro Salcedo
- Patricia Irribarra as Tía Nena, mother of Soraya
- Sergio Gajardo as Soraya's father
- Clara Brevis as Soraya's grandmother
- Nicolás Fontaine as Julián Pérez
- Reinaldo Vallejos as AGD&T Investor
- Víctor Rojas as Uncle Washington Salcedo
- Gabriel Maturana as Dr. Max Hernández
- Sergio Madrid as Valentina's doctor
- Osvaldo Lagos as Uncle Sebastián
- Cecilia Hidalgo as Lourdes
- Humberto Gallardo as Sacerdote
- Cristián Gajardo as Cholo Salcedo
- Néstor Castagno as college director
- Teresa Berríos as Rosita, friend of Chita
- Hugo Vásquez as Patricio
- Yamén Salazar as Andrés and Nicolás' professor
- Macarena Basterrica as Bernarda's secretary
- Carlos Araya as Josefina's chief
- Magdalena Ahumada as Evelyn Urquieta
