= Nicolás Vigneaux =

Chilean actor

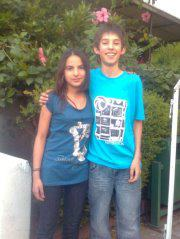
- Nicolás Vigneaux Poirot when he was young
- Born: Nicolás Francisco Alberto Vigneaux Poirot; March 8, 1997 (age 29); Santiago, Chile
- Occupation: Actor

Nicolás Vigneaux Poirot (born March 8, 1997, in Santiago) is an actor known by his first television series Mujeres de lujo who played Moses. also had a cameo in the TV series Infiltradas on Chilevisión.

Later, he worked on the area's dramatic National Television of Chile on the hit television series Aquí mando yo. and Separados.

== Filmography ==
Films
Year	Name	Character	Channel
2010	Mujeres de Lujo	Moisés Moyano / Diego Figueroa	Chilevisión
2011	Infiltradas	Airon	Chilevisión
2011	Aquí mando yo	Franco Bilbao / Franco Buzzoni	TVN
2012	Separados	Vicente Armstrong Cavada	TVN
2016	Rara	Julián	
