= Maricarmen Arrigorriaga =

Chilean actress

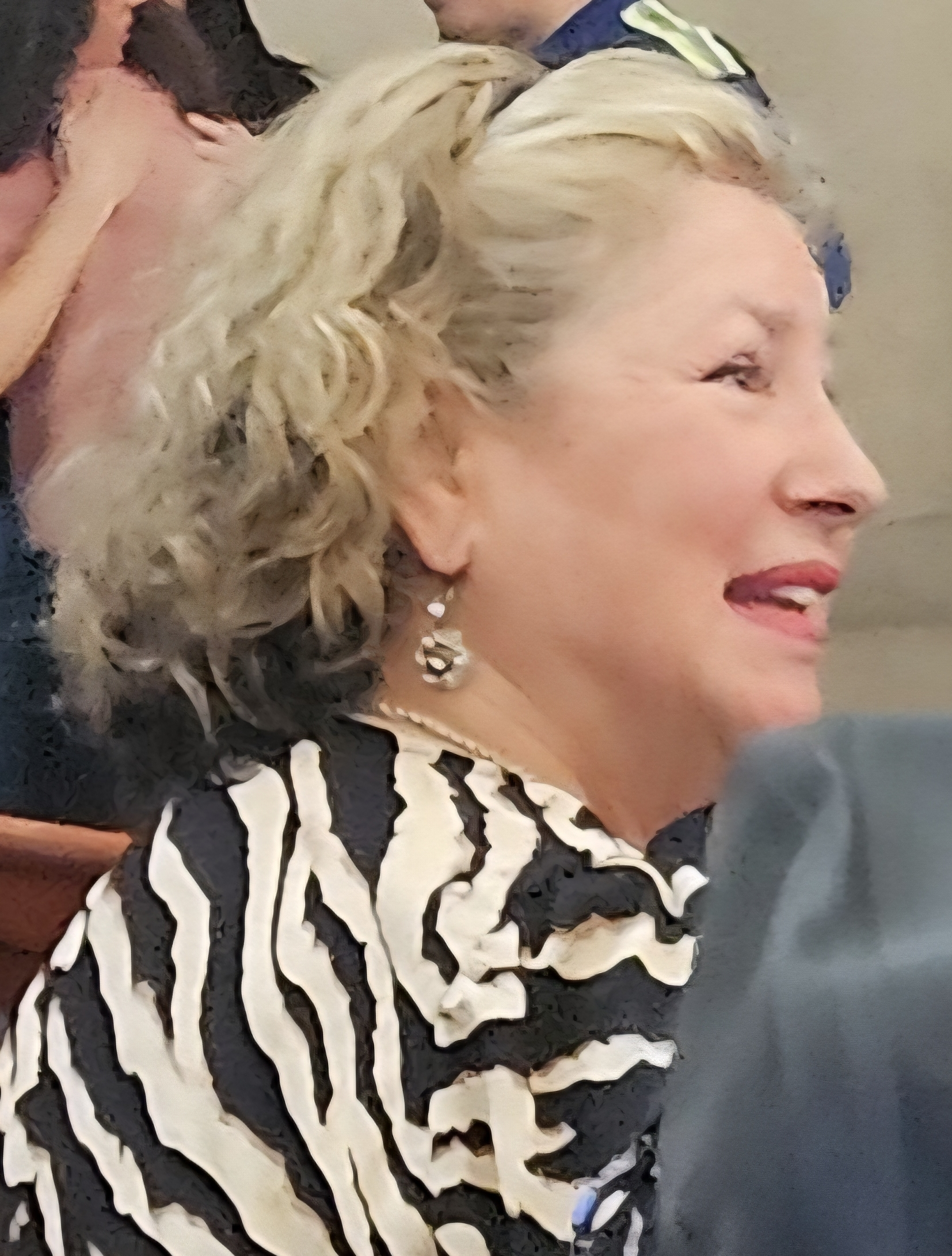
- In 2025
- Born: Maricarmen Arrigorriaga Aguirre; June 17, 1957 (age 68); Santiago, Chile
- Occupation: Actress
- Children: 2

Maricarmen Arrigorriaga Aguirre (born June 17, 1957 in Santiago) is a popular Chilean film and soap opera actress.

== Biography ==
She is the daughter of parents of origin Basque and has nine siblings. His training was in the Colegio Universitario Inglés and then at school Divina Pastora. Later he graduated to the School of Theatre in the University of Chile, but in the latter could not finish his studies because he was abrutamente sent to Europe before the eyes of their parents for personal reasons. Eight months later he returned to Chile, during that time also tried to graduating from the University several times, but finally gave up.

Maricarmen marriage contracted in 1985 with TV director Christian Mason to whom he was married five years, finally in a tough year separate.

== Career ==
It debuted at television when he was just starting the soap, replacing an actress with an antagonistic role on the daytime drama Casagrande on television Canal 13. His debut was an emergency, but he used to enter the area of the channel dramatically manduvo where for ten years. In 1992 at the end of El Palo al Gato, the TV director Óscar Rodriguez tells you that there were no papers for her and eventually migrates to the chain TV TVN debut on the hit daytime drama Amame. Parallel debut in film with the film Amnesia directed by Gonzalo Justiniano and Valparaíso directed by Mariano Andrade.

In Televisión Nacional de Chile remained another ten years, and participated in several dramatic productions, in which stands ( Rojo y Miel, Oro Verde, Aquelarre, Santoladrón and in addition to two sets).

In 2003, returns to television Canal 13 to participate in the successful production Machos. Keep in entering the field of several dramatic productions until 2007, where it is part of another successful production Lola, whose character just kept in the first stage and then was taken by another actress. In 2008 returned to the area's dramatic TVN led by Maria Eugenia Rencoret and is involved in the successful production Hijos del Monte.

== Filmography ==
- Amnesia (1994)
- Valparaíso (1994)
- Tuve un Sueño Contigo (1999) – Luisa
- Te Amo (made in Chile) (2001) – Isabel's mother
- Tres Noches de un Sábado (2002) – Amanda
- Fiestapatria (2006) – Irma
- The Toast (2007) – Sofía
- Life Kills Me (2007) – María Paz

Soap Opera and television credits
Year	Title	Role	Notes
1982	Casagrande	Inés	
1982	Anakena	Delia Fernández	
1983	Las Herederas	Vania	
1984	Andrea, Justicia de Mujer	Sandra	
1985	La Trampa	Teresita	
1986	Ángel Malo	Teresa García	
1987	La Invitación	María Luisa	
1988	Semidiós	Ángela	
1988	Matilde Dedos Verdes	Matilde	
1990	Te Conté?	Lucía	
1991	Villa Nápoli	Virginia Álvarez	
1992	El Palo al Gato	Ivonne	
1993	Ámame	Regina Agüero	
1994	Rojo y Miel	Bernardita	
1995	Juegos de Fuego	Vicky Casiraghi	
1997	Oro Verde	Raquel of Moraga	
1999	La Fiera	Isabel Moreno	Special Participation (1 episode)
1999	Aquelarre	Bernarda Álvarez	Nominated —Altazor Award of the National Arts for Best Actress on TV
2000	Santoladrón	Elvira of Amaral	
2003	Machos	Estela Salazar	
2004	Tentación	Antonia Domínguez	
2005	Gatas & Tuercas	Elisa San Juan	
2006	Charly Tango	Alicia Ferrada	
2007	Lola	Flora Soto	
2008	Hijos del Monte	Blanca Cifuentes	
2009	Los Ángeles de Estela	Pola Amunátegui	
2010	La Familia de al lado	Yolanda Sanhueza	
2011	Témpano	Ana María Quezada	Special Participation (38 episodes)
2011	Su Nombre es Joaquín	Sonia Arce	
2013	Soltera otra vez	Rebeca	Special Participation

Television Series Roles
Year	Title	Role	Notes
1989	Contigo Pan y Caviar	Adriana	Sitcom
1990	Crónica de un Hombre Santo	Ana Cruchaga (teenager)	
1997	La Buhardilla		
1998	Brigada Escorpión	Rose Mary	
2002	Más Que Amigos	Rodrigo's mother	
2003	Bienvenida Realidad	Teresa	
2006	Huaiquimán y Tolosa	Josefina	Special Participation (1 episode)
2007	Héroes	Carlota Altamirano	Special Participation (1 episode)
2010	Volver a Mí	Carme Luz	
2011	Ala Chilena	María Cecilia	Sitcom – (voice)
