= La chúcara =

Chilean telenovela

- Genre: Telenovela
- Created by: Julio Rojas Gutiérrez; Valeria Hoffman
- Written by: Sandra Arriagada; Natalia Luque; Francisco Arriagada; Jaime Morales
- Directed by: Matías Stagnaro; Alejandro Lagos
- Starring: Antonia Santa María; Felipe Braun; Bárbara Ruiz-Tagle
- Opening theme: "Los Matorrales" by La Guacha
- Country of origin: Chile
- Original language: Spanish
- No. of seasons: 1
- No. of episodes: 190

Production
- Executive producers: Alejandro Burr; Pablo Díaz del Río
- Producer: María Luisa Sousa
- Production location: Colina, Chile
- Production companies: DDRío Televisión; Televisión Nacional de Chile

Original release
- Network: TVN
- Release: December 1, 2014 – August 26, 2015

Related
- Vino el amor (2016)

La chúcara (English: Rebel in Love) is a 2014 Chilean telenovela produced by DDRío Televisión for Televisión Nacional de Chile. It is an original story by Julio Rojas Gutiérrez and Valeria Hoffman. The series stars Antonia Santa María, Felipe Braun and Bárbara Ruiz-Tagle. It aired on TVN from 1 December 2014 to 26 August 2015.

== Plot ==
Laura Muñoz is a beautiful young woman with strong personality who returns to Fundo Santa Piedad to reunite with her mother and brother. She meets a stern-looking man named Vicente Correa, the ranch owner who is recently widowed.

== Cast ==
=== Main ===
- Antonia Santa María as Laura Muñoz
- Felipe Braun as Vicente Correa
- Bárbara Ruiz-Tagle as Gracia Montero / Piedad Montero
- Josefina Velasco as Adriana del Solar
- Carmina Riego as Carmen Cubillos
- Eduardo Paxeco as Agustin Lara
- Juan Pablo Miranda as Orlando "Negro" Opazo
- Íñigo Urrutia as Juan Cristobal Cañas
- Pablo Casals as León Muñoz
- Mariana Derderian as Luciana Cavalli
- Carolina Paulsen as Rebeca López
- Alejandra Vega as Magdalena Andrade
- Nicole Espinoza as Carolina "Carito" Jiménez
- Luna Martínez as Roberta Correa
- Matías Torres as Francisco "Panchito" Correa

=== Recurring ===
- Mauricio Pitta as Gastón Muñoz
- Nicolás Saavedra as Tomás Espina
- Christián Sève as Rafael Belloni
