= Separados =

- Genre: Telenovela, Comedy
- Directed by: María Eugenia Rencoret; Ítalo Galleani
- Starring: Jorge Zabaleta; Álvaro Rudolphy; Sigrid Alegría; Luz Valdivieso; Fernando Larraín; Alejandra Fosalba; Andrés Velasco; Daniela Ramírez; Rodrigo Muñoz; Coca Guazzini
- Opening theme: Why can't we be friends? by Smash Mouth
- Country of origin: Chile
- Original language: Spanish
- No. of episodes: 123

Production
- Producers: Daniela Demicheli; Claudia Cazenave

Original release
- Network: TVN
- Release: October 22, 2012 – June 3, 2013

Related
- Reserva de familia; Socias

Separados (International Title: Better Off Single) is a Chilean telenovela originally aired on TVN.

== Cast ==
- Luz Valdivieso as Carolina Cavada
- Álvaro Rudolphy as Jaime Mathews
- Sigrid Alegría as Verónica Infante
- Jorge Zabaleta as Pedro Armstrong
- Fernando Larraín as Emilio Marambio
- Alejandra Fosalba as Macarena Damilano
- Andrés Velasco as Mateo Fernández
- Rodrigo Muñoz as Antonio "Toñito" García
- Francisca Gavilán as Rosario Aranda
- Coca Guazzini as María Isabel Correa
- Jaime Vadell as Álvaro Cavada
- Daniela Ramírez as Amanda Valenzuela
- Sebastián Goya as Andrés Beneyto
- Valeska Díaz as Javiera Mathews
- Ignacio Susperreguy as Pablo Marambio
- Nicolás Vigneaux as Vicente Armstrong
- Rosita Vial as Camila Amstrong
- Margarita Sánchez as Teresita Marambio

=== Special participations ===
- Daniel de la Vega as Psicologo
- María José Prieto as Claudia Armstrong
- Amaya Forch as Maite Subercaseaux
- Ignacia Allamand as Josefa Matte
- Javiera Cifuentes as Ana Fonseca
- Remigio Remedy as Alejandro Lamarca
- Lorena Capetillo as Fabiola Pérez
- Sebastián Layseca as Ignacio Mathews
- Javiera Acevedo as ¿?
- Santiago Tupper as Nicolás Ramírez
- Óscar Hernández as Sergio Beneyto
- Teresa Hales as Pamela Martini, Psicologa de Jaime
- Silvia Novak as Sonia Jaramillo
- Luis Wigdorsky as Héctor Santibañez
- Sergio Silva as Leonel "Guatón" Riquelme
- Matías Stevens as Gabriel
- María Contreras as Patricia
- Fernando Olivares as Sebastián
- Pedro Rivadeneira as Cristián
- Sebastián Arrigorriaga as Francisco
- Julián Castagno as Óscar, Maite's friend
- Marcela Arroyave as Prostituta
- Andrés Pozo as Sicólogo
- Ivana Llanos as Jaime's patient
- Jocelyn Medina as Odalisca
- Nataly Masinari as Promotora'
- Sandy Boquita as Sandy

== See also ==
- Televisión Nacional de Chile
