= Dos por uno =

- Also known as: Un papá como ninguno
- Directed by: María Eugenia Rencoret
- Starring: Diego Muñoz; Carolina Varleta; Adela Secall; Francisco Melo; María José Illanes; Mariana Loyola; Hernán Contreras
- Opening theme: Me estoy volviendo loco by DJ Méndez
- Country of origin: Chile
- Original language: Spanish
- No. of episodes: 117

Production
- Producers: Patricio López V. Cecilia Aguirre

Original release
- Network: TVN
- Release: March 11 – August 23, 2013

Related
- Pobre Rico; Somos Los Carmona

Dos por uno is a Chilean telenovela starring Diego Muñoz, Carolina Varleta and Adela Secall originally aired on TVN and it premiered on March 11, 2013.

== Cast ==
- Diego Muñoz as Ramiro Hernández / Valentina Infante/ Briggite Waters
- Carolina Varleta as Valentina Infante
- Mariana Loyola as Rita Casas
- Francisco Melo as Gonzalo Meyer - Villain
- Adela Secall as Alejandra Mardones
- María José Illanes as Adriana Ibarra - Villain
- Matías Oviedo as Pablo Saavedra
- Antonia Santa María as Angélica "Angy" Meyer
- Gloria Münchmeyer as Carlota Pinto
- Ximena Rivas as Silvia Villanueva
- José Martínez as Rodrigo Jorquera / Robert Jackson
- Loreto Valenzuela as Isidora Goycochea - Villain
- Hernán Contreras as Marcos Barrientos - Villain Principal
- Constanza Piccoli as Aurora Salinas
- Teresita Reyes as Lucy Santos
- Claudio Olate as Nelson Órdenes
- Belén Soto as Rafaela Hernández
- Giovanni Carella as Willy Casas
- Antonella Castagno as Daniela Hernández
- Valentina Vogel as Constanza Hernández

== See also ==
- Televisión Nacional de Chile
