= Carolina Arregui =

Chilean actress (born 1965)

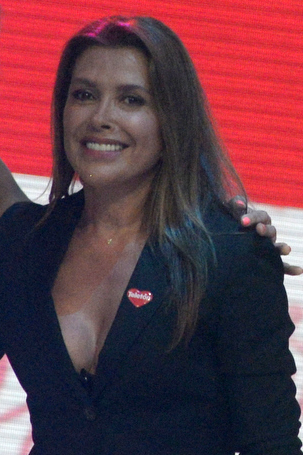
- Arregui in 2016
- Born: María Carolina Arregui Vuskovic; August 26, 1965 (age 61); Santiago, Chile
- Occupation: Actress
- Years active: 1983–present
- Spouses: Óscar Rodríguez (m. 1985–1993) Roy Sothers (m. 2005; died 2025)
- Children: 3

María Carolina Arregui Vuskovic (born August 26, 1965) is a Chilean television actress of Croatian and Basque descent. Although she never attended drama school, she is considered to be one of Chile's most popular and gifted actresses.

== Biography ==
She debuted at age 17 in the telenovela El Juego de la Vida. Since this work, she started her TV career obtaining some roles, as in Los Títeres, La Torre 10 and especially Ángel Malo, which is considered her breakthrough role.

In 1993, Arregui left her acting career for personal reasons, within a turmoil of controversy regarding her own marriage to Chilean TV director, Oscar Rodríguez. She returned in 1998, portraying Verónica Retamales in A Todo Dar. For this role, she won the APES (Asociación de Periodistas de Espectáculos) award for Best Actress.

In 2002, Carolina returned to Canal 13, her legendary TV station, in Buen Partido. The same year, she acted in the comedy play Entre Brujas, starring along fellow actresses Rosita Nicolet, Liliana García, Tichi Lobos and Loreto Valenzuela.

In 2003 she was cast in Machos as Sonia, one of the lead characters. Machos was a great success, becoming the telenovela with the highest rating in Chilean television that year. In 2005, she portrayed Beatriz in Brujas as a sexy and overwhelming woman. In 2008, she played Maira Acevedo in Don Amor, filmed in Puerto Rico and broadcast in both the island and in Chile. In 2009, Arregui played the character of Anita Rojas in Cuenta Conmigo.

In 2010, Arregui was crowned as queen of the 2010 Viña del Mar International Song Festival, voted by the media covering the event.

== Television ==
- El Juego de la Vida (TVN, 1983)
- La Torre 10 (TVN, 1984) - Gabriela Ugalde
- Los títeres (Canal 13, 1984) - Gloria Leyton
- Ángel Malo (Canal 13, 1986) - Nice Oyarzo (lead character)
- La Última Cruz (Canal 13, 1987) - Kim Kazar
- Semidiós (Canal 13, 1988) - Adriana Lemus
- Te Conté (Canal 13, 1990) - Gianna
- Villa Nápoli (Canal 13, 1991) - Olivia Reyes
- El Palo al Gato (Canal 13, 1992) - Marilí Rojas
- Marrón Glacé (Canal 13, 1993) - Vanessa Aguilera (lead character)
- A Todo Dar (Mega, 1998) - Verónica Retamales
- Algo Está Cambiando (Mega, 1999) - Marta Echeverría (antagonist)
- La Otra Cara del Espejo (Mega, 2000)
- Buen Partido (Canal 13, 2002) - Milagros Cienfuegos (lead character)
- Machos (Canal 13, 2003) - Sonia Trujillo (lead character)
- Hippie (Canal 13, 2004) - Victoria Vicuña
- Brujas (Canal 13, 2005) - Beatriz González (lead character)
- Descarado (Canal 13, 2006) - Amanda Cortés / A-7 (lead character, antagonist)
- Don Amor (Canal 13, 2008) - Maira Acevedo (lead character)
- Cuenta Conmigo (Canal 13, 2009) - Anita María Rojas (lead character)
- Feroz (TV series) (Canal 13, 2010) - Carmen Ramírez (lead character)
- Primera dama (Canal 13, 2010) - Estrella Soto (lead character)
- Peleles (Canal 13, 2011) - Andrea Barahona
- Pobre Rico (TVN, 2012) - Eloísa Rivas
- Somos Los Carmona (TVN, 2013) - Rosa Leiva
- No Abras La Puerta (TVN, 2014) - Gladys
- Caleta del sol (TVN, 2014) - Elena Aranguiz (lead character)
- El Camionero, (TVN, 2016) - Vilma Flores

=== Theatre ===
- Entre Brujas (2002)
