= Antonia Santa María =

Chilean actress

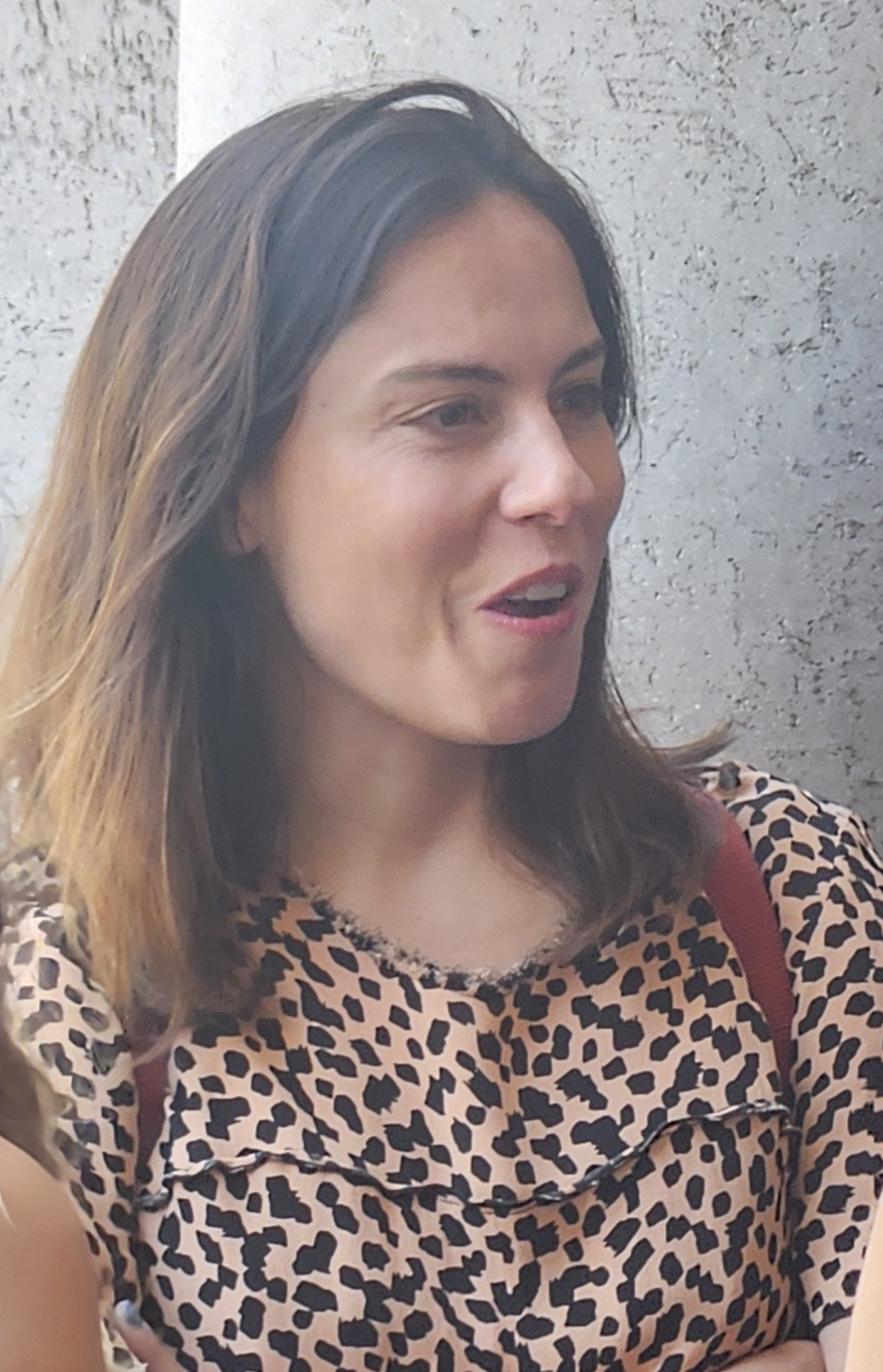
- in 2025
- Born: Antonia Santa María Monckeberg; 22 July 1982 (age 44); Santiago, Chile
- Education: Pontifical Catholic University of Chile
- Occupations: Actress, singer
- Years active: 2005–present
- Spouse: Álvaro Viguera (2012–present)
- Relatives: Constanza Santa María (sister)

Antonia Santa María Monckeberg (born 22 July 1982) is a Chilean film, television, and theater actress.

== Biography ==
The daughter of Juan Pedro Santa María Pérez, legal director of Banco Santander and great-grandson of President Domingo Santa María, Antonia Santa María attended the Apoquindo School and, after completing her secondary education, studied theater at the Catholic University. She refined her skills with an acting seminar at Alfredo Castro's school. She has also taken singing and dancing courses.

Her first television series was Brujas on Canal 13, playing the role of Sharon Sánchez. She next joined Descarado and Papi Ricky on the same network. In 2008 she began to appear on Televisión Nacional de Chile (TVN) series such as El señor de La Querencia, Hijos del Monte, Conde Vrolok, La familia de al lado, and La chúcara, with the latter being her first leading role.

In 2006, the year after her premiere in Brujas, she performed professionally in theater for the first time, in the play Oedipus (o La múltiple dislexia), a version of Oedipus Rex written and directed by Luna del Canto. Since then she has made sporadic theatrical appearances, in productions such as El Último Cuplé, el cabaret de Sarita Montiel and Gladys.

She debuted on the big screen as Antonia in Las niñas (2007), the award-winning first work by Rodrigo Marín. She acted in Quiero entrar (2011) by Roberto Farías, and Pérez (2012), which was directed by her husband, Álvaro Viguera, and of which she was also a producer. The film, for which Viguera won the Best Director award at the 2012 Santiago International Film Festival, is based on the 2009 play of the same name by Elisa Zulueta (in which Santa María also acted).

She is the youngest of four siblings: painter and musician Pedro Santa María, journalist and singer Constanza Santa María, and architect and musician Rodrigo Santa María.

== Filmography ==
=== Films ===
Year	Title	Role
2007	Las niñas	Antonia
2008	Edgar	Consuelo
2011	Quiero entrar	
2012	Pérez	Roma Pérez
2013	Gloria	María

=== Telenovelas ===
Year	Title	Role	Channel
2005	Brujas	Sharon Sánchez	Canal 13
2006	Descarado	Perla Cortés	Canal 13
2007	Papi Ricky	María Paz Spencer	Canal 13
2008	El señor de La Querencia	Violeta Moreno	TVN
2008	Hijos del Monte	Consuelo Millán	TVN
2009–2010	Conde Vrolok	Úrsula Donoso	TVN
2010	La familia de al lado	Hilda González	TVN
2011	Su nombre es Joaquín	Carolina Ortega	TVN
2013	Dos por uno	Ángelica "Angie" Pavez	TVN
2014	El amor lo manejo yo	Noelia Fernández	TVN
2014–2015	La Chúcara	Laura Muñoz	TVN
2017–2018	Dime quién fue	Laura Castillo	TVN

=== TV series and specials ===
Year	Title	Role	Channel
2005	Los simuladores	Anastasia Soto	Canal 13
2006	Dinastía Sa-Sá	Sharon Janet Sánchez	Canal 13
2009	Mi bella genio	Laura Paloma Andrómeda	TVN

=== TV programs ===
- Más vale tarde (Mega, 2013) – Guest
- Juga2 (TVN, 2013) – Participant
- Dudo (13C, 2013) – Guest
- Cadena Nacional (Vía X, 2013) – Guest
- Más que 2 (TVN, 2014) – Guest
- La Juguera (TVN, 2017) - Interviewee
- Muy buenos días (TVN, 2017) – Guest

=== Music videos ===
- 2012: "Mis cenizas" by Rodrigo Santa María
- 2013: "Suicidas" by Rodrigo Santa María

== Theater ==
Year	Work	Role	Author	Director	Theater	Ref.
2009	Pérez	Roma	Elisa Zulueta	Elisa Zulueta	Teatro del Puente	
2010-11	El Último Cuplé	Sarita Montiel		Álvaro Viguera	Centro Cultural Amanda (2010); Teatro Municipal de Las Condes (2011)	
2011-13	Gladys	Uxue	Elisa Zulueta	Elisa Zulueta	Teatro del Puente (2011); Teatro UC (2012); La Araucanía (Temuco, 2013); Centro GAM (2013)	
2013	Acción armada 42 26, 73 35		Andrés Kalawski	Ramón López	Teatro UC	
2017	Uncle Vanya	Sonia	Anton Chekhov	Álvaro Viguera	CorpArtes	

== Discography ==
- 2013: Ceniza (collaboration with Rodrigo Santa María)
