= Mariana Loyola =

Chilean actress

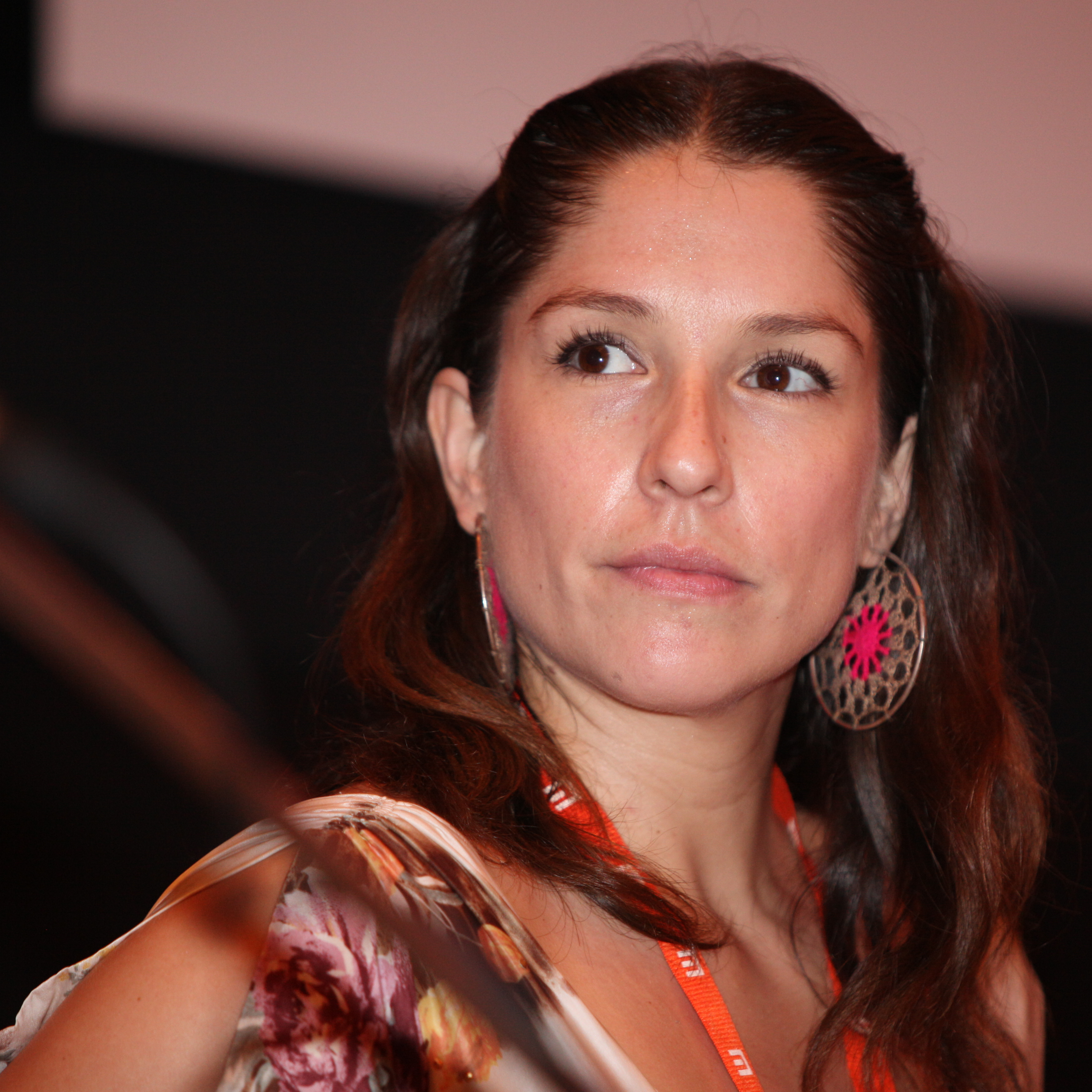
- Born: 2 August 1975 (age 50); Santiago, Chile
- Occupation: Actor
- Years active: 1997–present

Mariana Francisca Loyola Ruz (Santiago, 2 August 1975) is a Chilean theater, film, and television actress. Loyola began to work regularly in the theater until in 2001 she was cast in the telenovela Amores de mercado. That same year she made her feature film debut with Andrés Wood's La fiebre del loco followed by Sub Terra and Cachimba. Further appearances in television projects such as Machos followed, as did inclusion in the international cast of El baile de la Victoria.

She has been the winner of the main awards in her country, two APES, an Altazor Award, a Pedro Sienna Awards and a Caleuche Award. In addition, an award at the Festival de Cine Iberoamericano de Huelva and an award at the Cartagena Film Festival.

== Filmography ==
=== Film ===
Films
Year	Film	Role	Director
2000	Monos con navaja	Isabella	Stanley Gonczanski
2001	Negocio redondo	Rosita María	Ricardo Carrasco
2001	La fiebre del loco	Patricia	Andrés Wood
2003	Sub Terra	Mercedes	Marcelo Ferrari
2004	Cachimba	Hildita	Silvio Caiozzi
2005	Amor después de la marea	Nina	Pamela Espinoza
2008	El baile de la Victoria	Liliana	Fernando Trueba
2009	The Maid	Lucía "Lucy"	Sebastián Silva
2009	Súper, todo Chile adentro	Nancy	Fefa Alijaro
2012	Bahía Azul	Lidia	Nicolás Acuña
2012	Génesis nirvana	Patricia Lucía	Alejandro Lagos
2014	Aurora	Alicia	Rodrigo Sepúlveda
2016	Rara	Paula	Pepa San Martín
2019	Ema		Pablo Larraín
2024	Malas costumbres	Sara Yáñez	Pablo Mantilla

=== Telenovelas ===
Telenovelas
Year	telenovela	Role	Channel
2001	Amores de mercado	Topacio Peralta	20px TVN
2003	Machos	Soraya Salcedo	20px Canal 13
2004	Tentación	Camila Risopatrón	20px Canal 13
2005	Gatas & Tuercas	Lulú Rivera	20px Canal 13
2006	Charly Tango	Alma Uribe / Rosario Toledo	20px Canal 13
2007	Fortunato	Yolanda "Yoli" Cuevas	20px Mega
2010	Manuel Rodríguez	Mercedes Larraín Fernández de León	15px Chilevisión
2011	Peleles	Pamela Leiva	20px Canal 13
2013	Dos por uno	Rita Casas	20px TVN
2018	Si yo fuera rico	Julia Molina	20px Mega
2024	Secretos de familia	Raquel Cruchaga Echeverria	Canal 13

=== TV Series ===
Series y unitarios
Año	Serie	Rol	Canal
2005	Amor después de la marea	Nina	20px TVN
2005	Los simuladores	Claudia	20px Canal 13
2006	Huaiquimán y Tolosa	Penélope Díaz	20px Canal 13
2007	Héroes	Ana	20px Canal 13
2008	Aída	Aída	20px TVN
2011	Karma	Carmen	15px Chilevisión
2011	12 días: Horror en Quilicura	María Estela Ortiz	15px Chilevisión
2013	Prófugos	Mariana	20px HBO
2015	Familia moderna	Paula Gallo	20px Mega
2017	Papá Mono	Francisca Martínez	20px Canal 13
2017	12 días: Tragedia en Juan Fernández	Sandra Medel	15px Chilevisión
2018	Bichos raros	Verónica Mancinelli	20px TVN
2018	Mary & Mike	Mariana Callejas	15px Chilevisión
2018	Lo que callamos las mujeres	Pamela	15px Chilevisión
2020	Los Carcamales	Laura de la Carrera	20px Canal 13
2024	‘’Baby Bandito’’	Ana	Netflix
