= La madrastra (1981 TV series) =

- Title card
- Genre: Crime drama
- Created by: Arturo Moya Grau
- Directed by: Óscar Rodríguez
- Creative director: Jorge Garate
- Starring: Jael Ünger; Walter Kliche
- Opening theme: "Soy el amor" by Alejandra Álamo
- Country of origin: Chile
- Original language: Spanish
- No. of episodes: 75

Production
- Executive producer: Ricardo Larenas
- Producers: Astrid Campos; Gisela Montenegro
- Production locations: Santiago, Chile; Los Angeles, United States
- Cinematography: Oscar Alarcon; Manuel Villaroel
- Editor: Ricardo Montoya
- Camera setup: Multiple camera
- Running time: 55–60 minutes
- Production company: Corporación de Televisión de la Pontificia Universidad Católica de Chile

Original release
- Network: Canal 13
- Release: April 21 – September 18, 1981

Related
- Vivir un poco (1985); Para toda la vida (1996); Forever (1996); La madrastra (2005) ¿Quién mató a Patricia Soler? (2014); La madrastra (2022)

La Madrastra (lit: The Stepmother) is a Chilean television soap opera created by Arturo Moya Grau, that aired on Canal 13 from April 21 to September 18, 1981, starring Jael Unger and Walter Kliche. The series, set in Los Angeles and Santiago between 1961 and 1981, depicts the memoirs of Marcia Espínola, a woman wrongfully accused of murder in America. Twenty years later, she is freed from prison, returning to Chile for revenge, and to see her children as their stepmother. La Madrastra having achieved both wide acclaim and commercial success with 80% television ratings, became a significant part of the 1980s Chilean popular culture.

Directed by Óscar Rodríguez and comprising a total of 75 episodes, the series has been consistently ranked by Latin American media as one of the greatest television screenplay in Spanish language of all time, and has been remade several times by other television networks. La Madrastra has been cited as a key influence on Chilean television productions inspiring screenwriters until now. International versions has been adapted and rebranded as Vivir un poco (1985), Para toda la vida (1996), Forever (1996), La Madrastra (2005), ¿Quién mató a Patricia Soler? (2014) , La madrastra (2022) and recent A Madrasta (2026).

== Plot ==
The series starts twenty years earlier when a group of Chilean friends travel for fun to Los Angeles, United States. One night in the hotel a gunshot is heard, and Marcia Jones (Jael Unger), the first to hear it, runs to the room where she heard the shot to find her friend Patricia dead on the floor. Marcia picks up the gun by accident, therefore becoming the sole murder suspect. Months later she is found guilty and sentenced to 20 years in prison in the United States. During the trial it is discovered that at the time of her death, Patricia was pregnant. Every friend Marcia thought she had shuns her, including her husband Esteban San Lucas (Walter Kliche), who leaves her in the United States and forces her to sign a marriage annulment.

The story moves on to present day (1981), Marcia has now become a bitter woman who only maintains contact with her attorney, who has always believed in her innocence and tries to help her. Father Belisario (Tennyson Ferrada), a priest in Pomaire also remains in touch with Marcia and regularly sends her Chilean food and clay which Marcia uses to make highly-appraised figurines which had allowed her to generate a small fortune by herself. One day Marcia is released from prison and decides to return to Chile. At this point, Esteban is about to marry Ana Rosa (Ana María Palma), to the dismay of Héctor (Ramón Farías), Luna (Claudia Di Girólamo), and Ricardo (Alberto Vega), Esteban's children with Marcia. Especially since the wedding day coincides with another anniversary of the "mother's death"—Esteban had told this lie to his kids so he wouldn't have to tell them she was a murderer.

Days later, the group of friends receives an invitation to a hotel where they find out that they have been summoned by Marcia herself, who has returned to reclaim her children and finally discover Patricia's real murderer. She begins by making Esteban cease his relationship with Ana Rosa, and goes on to remarry him herself, therefore becoming "La Madrastra" ("The Stepmother") of her own children who reject her completely and make her life impossible at first. But as time goes on, Marcia slowly regains their trust.

At the same time, she slowly uncovers the truth: Patricia's murderer was Estrella (Gloria Münchmeyer), who killed Patricia because she was expecting a baby that could have possibly come from her affair with Estrella's husband Donato (Jaime Vadell) who might have left Estrella to be with Patricia and their baby.

== Cast ==
- Jael Unger as Maria Espínola / Marcia Jones.
- Walter Kliche as Esteban San Lucas.
- Sonia Viveros as Claudia Molina.
- Patricio Achurra as Leonelo Ibañez.
- Marés González as Luisa San Lucas.
- Nelly Meruane as Dora San Lucas.
- Sergio Urrutia as Miguel Ángel.
- Arturo Moya Grau as El Langosta.
- Ana María Palma as Ana Rosa.
- Gonzalo Robles as Carlos.
- Tennyson Ferrada as Padre Belisario.
- Lucy Salgado as Casta de Molina.
- Cristián Campos as Greco Molina.
- Alberto Vega as Ricardo San Lucas.
- Ramón Farías as Hector San Lucas.
- Claudia Di Girolamo as Luna San Lucas.
- Jaime Vadell as Donato.
- Gloria Münchmeyer as Estrella.
- Mario Lorca as Boris.
- Silvia Santelices as Felisa.
- Eduardo Naveda as Serafín.
- Yoya Martínez as Vivian.
- Sergio Aguirre as Harry.
- Coca Guazzini as Hortencia.
- Paz Irarrázabal as La Condesa.

== Impact and reception ==
During the five months of broadcast, La madrastra, was the most seen television programme in Chile. According to audience measurements, the final episode aired on September 18, 1981, reached 80% television ratings. Director Óscar Rodríguez, said that "It was heard that meetings from top executives and ministers were postponed" ("Se supo de reuniones de ministros y ejecutivos que fueron suspendidas") and that "that afternoon, there wasn't a single soul walking the streets of the city and that soda fountains in Santiago's city centre put up signs saying "Here we watch La Madrastra."" (esa tarde no circulaba un alma por las calles y que las fuentes de soda del centro de Santiago pusieron carteles que decían “aquí se ve La Madrastra”).

For Canal 13's 50th-anniversary celebrations in 2009, they produced and released TV o no TV, a small series narrating the story of television on Chilean society. In the series it was described the level of popularity of the series back when the series finale was aired in 1981. Additionally, La madrastra touched on the impact that this soap opera had on the careers of the actors, specially the role of Gloria Münchmeyer as Estrella, the killer of Patricia.

== International adaptations ==
In 1985, Televisa purchased the original screenplay, adapting it and shooting a new version called Vivir un poco, which was premiered in Mexico on July 29, 1985, on Canal de las Estrellas starring Angélica Aragón and Rogelio Guerra. After 165 episodes Vivir un poco came to an end on March 14, 1986. Ten years later, in 1996 was released Para toda la vida, co-production between broadcasters companies Megavisión and Televisa, from Chile and Mexico, respectively. Starring Ofelia Medina and Exequiel Lavanderos, Para toda la vida had low television ratings, the original story was cut, and unexpectedly the main actress Ofelia Medina resigned. That same year was launched the American version called Forever, that aired on the Fox network from June 10, to September 27, 1996, comprising a total of 80 episodes, starring Maria Mayenzet and Mark Schneider.

Starring Victoria Ruffo and César Évora, the new La Madrastra, was broadcast in Mexico from February 7, to July 29, 2005. That adaptation became highly successful in several countries. In 2014, the Colombian broadcaster RCN Televisión released the fifth adaptation, called ¿Quién mató a Patricia Soler?, it was developed by RTI Producciones having as main characters Itatí Cantoral and Miguel de Miguel. This series also was broadcast in the United States by the Spanish-language network MundoFox. In 2022, TelevisaUnivision produced a second version in serial format starring Aracely Arámbula and Andrés Palacios.

in 2026 TVI of Portugal remade the series as A Madrasta

== Home releases and merchandise ==
Set details			Special features
75 episodes; 9-double disc set (DVD); 4:3 aspect ratio; Languages: Spanish (Stereo); Subtitles: Spanish; English			Commentaries; Live music video of "Soy el amor" by Alejandra Álamo; Television reports of Teletrece; Image gallery
DVD release dates			Commentaries; Live music video of "Soy el amor" by Alejandra Álamo; Television reports of Teletrece; Image gallery
Region 1	Region 2	Region 4	Commentaries; Live music video of "Soy el amor" by Alejandra Álamo; Television reports of Teletrece; Image gallery
TBA	TBA	October 4, 2007	Commentaries; Live music video of "Soy el amor" by Alejandra Álamo; Television reports of Teletrece; Image gallery
