= Jorge Zabaleta =

Chilean actor (born 1970)

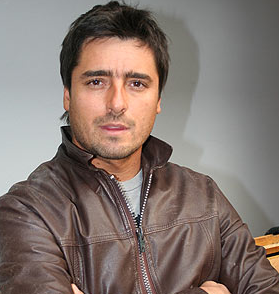
- Born: Jorge Antonio Zabaleta Briceño; 18 April 1970 (age 56); Santiago, Chile
- Occupations: Actor, TV presenter
- Partner: Francisca Allende
- Children: 3

Jorge Zabaleta is a Chilean television actor. He is best known for his portrayal of an unconventional single father in Papi Ricky (2007) on Canal 13. He worked in Canal 13 until 2008, when he joined TVN working in Hijos del Monte.

He is the son of the musician Antonio Zabaleta and the nephew of Miguel Zabaleta, both members of the duo Red Juniors.

== Filmography ==
Television

Year	Title	Role	Channel	Other notes	Ref.
1997	Playa Salvaje	Ignacio San Martín			
1998	Marparaiso	Sebastian Valderrama			
1999	Fuera de Control	Pablo Olguin		1 Episode	
1999	Cerro Alegre	Mauricio Mendez/Mauricio Del Sol			
2001	Corazon Pirata	Mateo Labarca			
2002	Mas que Amigos	Alvaro Donoso			
2003	Machos	Alex Mercader	Canal 13		
2004	Hippie	Martín Hidalgo	Canal 13		
2004	Quiero	Himself		1 Episode	
2005	Brujas	Dante Ruiz	Canal 13		
2006	Descarado	Tomas Castillo	Canal 13		
2007	Papi Ricky	Ricardo "Ricky" Montes	Canal 13		
2008	Hijos del Monte	Juan Del Monte	TVN		
2009	Los Angeles de Estela	Leon Inostroza	TVN		
2010	La Familia de al lado	Javier Ruiz Tagle	TVN		
2011	Ala Chilena	Himself		1 Episode	
2011	Aquí Mando Yo	Diego Buzzoni	TVN		
2012	Separados	Pedro Armstrong	TVN		
2014	El Amor Lo Manejo Yo	Marcos Guerrero	TVN		
2015	Dueños del Paraíso	Conrado San Miguel	TVN; Telemundo		
2016	Sres. Papis	Ignacio Moreno	Mega		
2018	Si yo fuera rico	Nelson Peña	Mega		
2019	Juegos de poder	Aníbal Ramos	Mega		
