= Aquí mando yo =

- Genre: Telenovela; Comedy
- Written by: Daniella Castagno, Luis Ponce, Elena Muñoz, Rodrigo Muñoz, Rodrigo Bastidas
- Directed by: Italo Galleani; Nicolás Alemparte (2nd unit); María Eugenia Rencoret (TVN's dramatic dept.)
- Starring: Jorge Zabaleta; María Elena Swett; Cristián Riquelme
- Opening theme: Te amo con locura (Eyci and Cody)
- Country of origin: Chile
- Original language: Spanish
- No. of episodes: 160

Production
- Executive producer: Vania Portilla H.
- Producer: Patricia Encina
- Camera setup: Multicamera

Original release
- Network: TVN
- Release: September 12, 2011 – April 23, 2012

Aquí mando yo (International Title: I Am The Boss) is a Chilean telenovela produced and broadcast by TVN.

== Plot ==
Sofía Kuncar (María Elena Swett) is a successful executive, who is promoted to regional manager for Latin America at the headhunting company where she works. She has two daughters, Antonella (Catalina Castelblanco) and Chiara (Emilia Burr), with her ex-husband Diego Buzzoni (Jorge Zabaleta), a radio personality. Since her job now requires Sofía to travel constantly between New York City, Chicago, and other U.S. cities and Santiago, Sofía decides to ask Diego to take care of their daughters. Though Sofía is dating Jorge Camacho (Cristián Riquelme), her boss, and has been separated from her ex-husband for 4 years, Diego is still in love with her.

== Cast ==
- Jorge Zabaleta - Diego Buzzoni
- María Elena Swett - Sofía Kuncar, Diego's ex-wife
- Cristián Riquelme - Jorge Camacho, Sofía's boss and boyfriend
- Carolina Varleta - Anita Bilbao, Sofía's neighbour and best friend, interested in Diego
- Coca Guazzini - Rocío Leighton, Sofía's mother
- Jaime Vadell - Pedro Montenegro, Maximiliano's father
- Fernando Larraín - Maximiliano Montenegro, Pedro's son, María Carolina's ex-husband
- Begoña Basauri - María Carolina Silva, Maximiliano's ex-wife
- Rodrigo Muñoz - Arnoldo Grez
- Yamila Reyna - Laura Mazza, Arnoldo's girlfriend
- Fernando Farías - Gino Buzzoni, Diego's father
- Loreto Valenzuela - Carmen Morales, Diego's mother
- Catalina Castelblanco - Antonella Buzzoni, Sofía and Diego's elder daughter
- Alonso Quintero - Rodrigo Montenegro, Maximiliano's son
- Constanza Piccoli - Isabel Grez, Arnoldo's daughter
- Hernán Contreras - Cristián Grez, Arnoldo's son
- Catalina Vallejos - Josefina Egaña, Cristián's girlfriend.
- Nicolás Vigneaux - Franco Bilbao, Anita's son
- Emilia Burr - Kiara Buzzoni, Sofía and Diego's younger daughter
- Antonella Castagno - Margarita Egaña

== Reception ==
The telenovela was received with successful ratings. Terra.cl claims that this circumstance is "reactivating" the 20:00 weekday timeslot, when as of early 2011 only TVN was broadcasting telenovelas, after Canal 13 pulled off its productions, and that even Mega and Chilevisión were considering competing with their own series. The critic at queveo.cl, a website by parents concerned with the media their children consume, praises the acting of Zabaleta and Swett and celebrates the "return" of family-oriented telenovelas.
