= Belén Soto =

Chilean actress and model (born 1997)

- Born: Pía Belén Soto Infante; January 22, 1997 (age 29); Santiago
- Other names: La tierna niña de Papi Ricky
- Occupations: Actress, Writer Mmdel
- Years active: 2007–present
- Known for: Papi Ricky

Pía Belén Soto Infante (born January 22, 1997. Santiago), best known as Belén Soto, is a Chilean actress, Writer and model. Her role debut was in Papi Ricky (a Chilean TV series of 2007).

== Life and career ==
Soto was born in January 1997 in Chile, was daughter of Aldo Soto and Carolina Infante, also has a sister and a brother. In 2011 Aldo Soto died due to cardiac arrest because he was suffering of cancer. She finished highschool in Colegio San Francisco Javier and thinks to keep with her career studying in an acting school.

She started recording audios for Chilean station radios and at 10 years old she made her debut in the Canal 13 (Chile) Chilean TV series Papi Ricky as Alicia, an 8-year-old little girl.

Belén is considered as a Chilean Barbie in most countries of Latin America for make television publicity for children TV channels Soto actually is a magazine model called the new "it girl made in Chile"

" I want to study acting and journalism, as the theater would help quite in journalism to encourage".

— Belén Soto, Revista biut

In 2014 she went as invited to the program TV series Mujeres Primero and said she was threatened with death if she attending a concert of Justin Bieber by beliebers.

== Filmography ==
Year	Title	Role	Other notes
2007	Papi Ricky	Alicia Montes	
2008	Los 80	Gracia	
2009	Cuenta Conmigo	Sofia Sarmiento	
2010	Feroz	Isidora Tagle	
2013	Dos por uno	Rafaela Hernández	
2015	El Camionero	Alejandra Sanhueza	
2016	Prueba de Actitud	Jeshu	
2017	Wena Profe	Florencia Meza Domínguez	
2018–2019	La Reina de Franklin	Valentina	
2019	Plan de VIAJE	BELEN TV Host	

== Books ==
Year	Title	Role	Other notes
– 2019	No Te Lo Mereces	Author	–
– 2020	Mujer Power	Author	–

== Awards ==
Year	Title	Category
2007	Copihue de Oro	Best Chilean Actress
