= Cristián Arriagada =

Chilean film, television, and theater actor

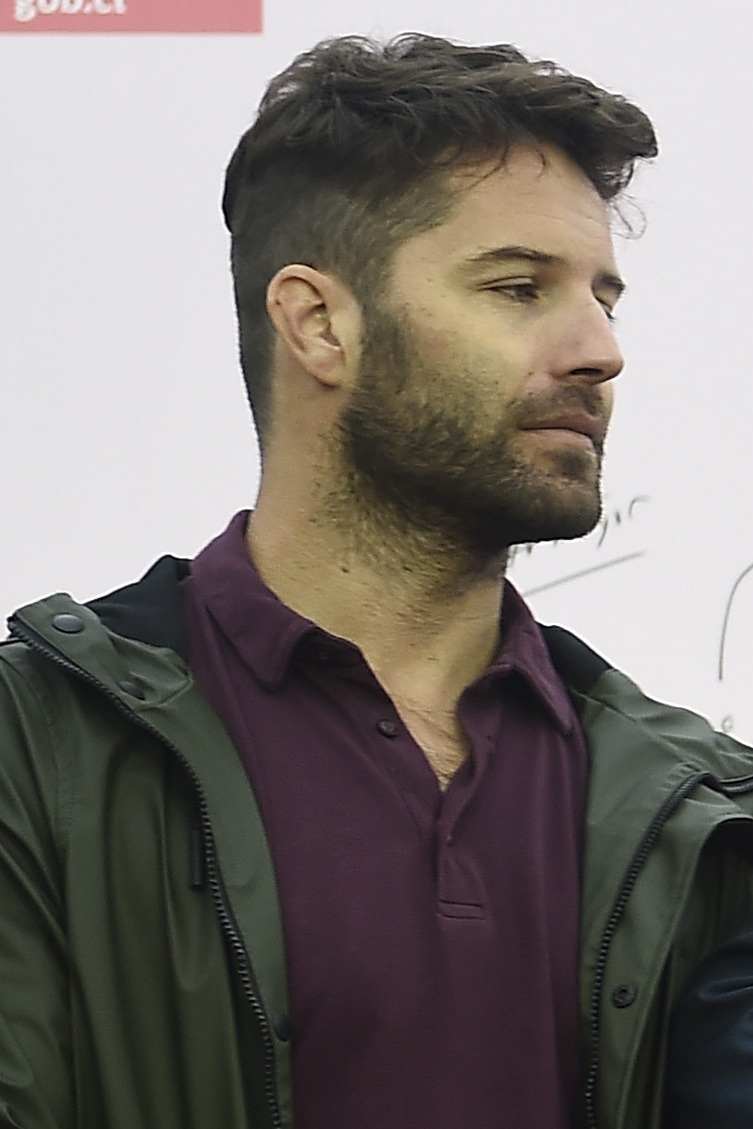
- Arriagada in 2016
- Born: Cristián Andrés Arriagada Bižaca; March 15, 1981 (age 45); Punta Arenas, Chile
- Occupation: Actor

Cristián Andrés Arriagada Bižaca (born March 15, 1981) is a Chilean television, theatre and film actor. He is of Croat origin (island of Brač) through his mother's side.

== Filmography ==
- Bang (2006): Joaquín

=== Miniseries ===
- La vida es una lotería: "El osito enamorado" (TVN, 2003) – Mauricio
- La vida es una lotería: "Un pedazo de mi suerte" (TVN, 2003) - Camilo

=== Soap operas ===
- Buen partido, (Canal 13, 2002) - Martín Márquez
- 16, (TVN, 2003) - Ignacio Vargas
- Ídolos (TVN, 2004) - Gabriel Figueroa
- 17, (TVN, 2005) - Ignacio Vargas
- Versus, (TVN, 2005) - Octavio Cox
- Amor en tiempo récord, (TVN, 2006) - Íñigo
- Disparejas, (TVN, 2006) - Ricardo
- Floribella, (TVN, 2006) - Federico Fritzenwalden
- Amor por accidente, (TVN, 2007) - Alex Amenábar
- Hijos del Monte, (TVN, 2008) - Pedro Del Monte
- Los Angeles de Estela (TVN) (2009) - Emilio Palacios
- La Familia de al Lado (TVN) (2010) - Leonardo Acosta / Hugo Acosta
- Soltera otra vez (Canal 13, 2012) - Rodrigo
- Verdades Ocultas (Mega (Chile), 2019) Diego Castillo

== Theatre ==
- El método de Grönholm
- Movimiento rápido del ojo
- El diario de un asesor presidencial
- El alma buena de Se-Chuan
- La ópera de tres centavos
