= List of Chilean actors =

This is a list of notable Chilean actors of film, television, theatre, radio, and others.

== A ==
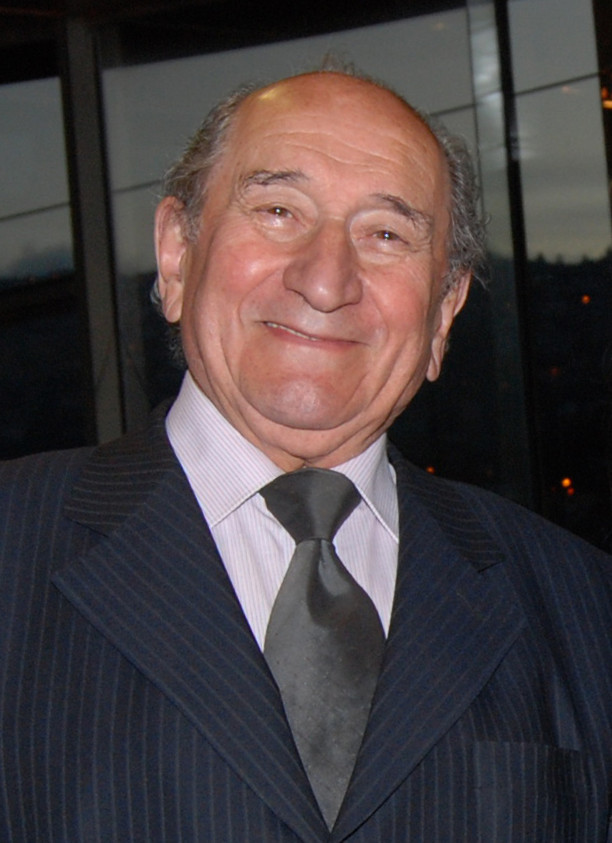
Luis Alarcón (1929–2023)

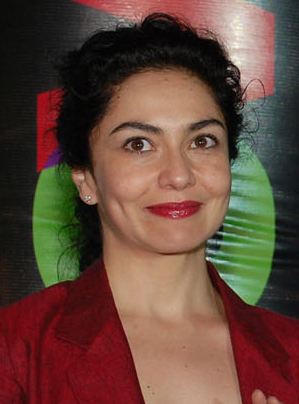
Tamara Acosta (1972–present)

- Ignacio Achurra
- Patricio Achurra
- Tamara Acosta
- Fernando Alarcón
- Luis Alarcón
- Daniel Alcaíno
- Sigrid Alegría
- Ignacia Allamand
- Marcelo Alonso
- Nathalia Aragonese
- Loreto Aravena
- Iván Arenas
- Raquel Argandoña
- Carolina Arredondo
- Claudio Arredondo
- Carolina Arregui
- Maricarmen Arrigorriaga
- Cristián Arriagada

== B ==
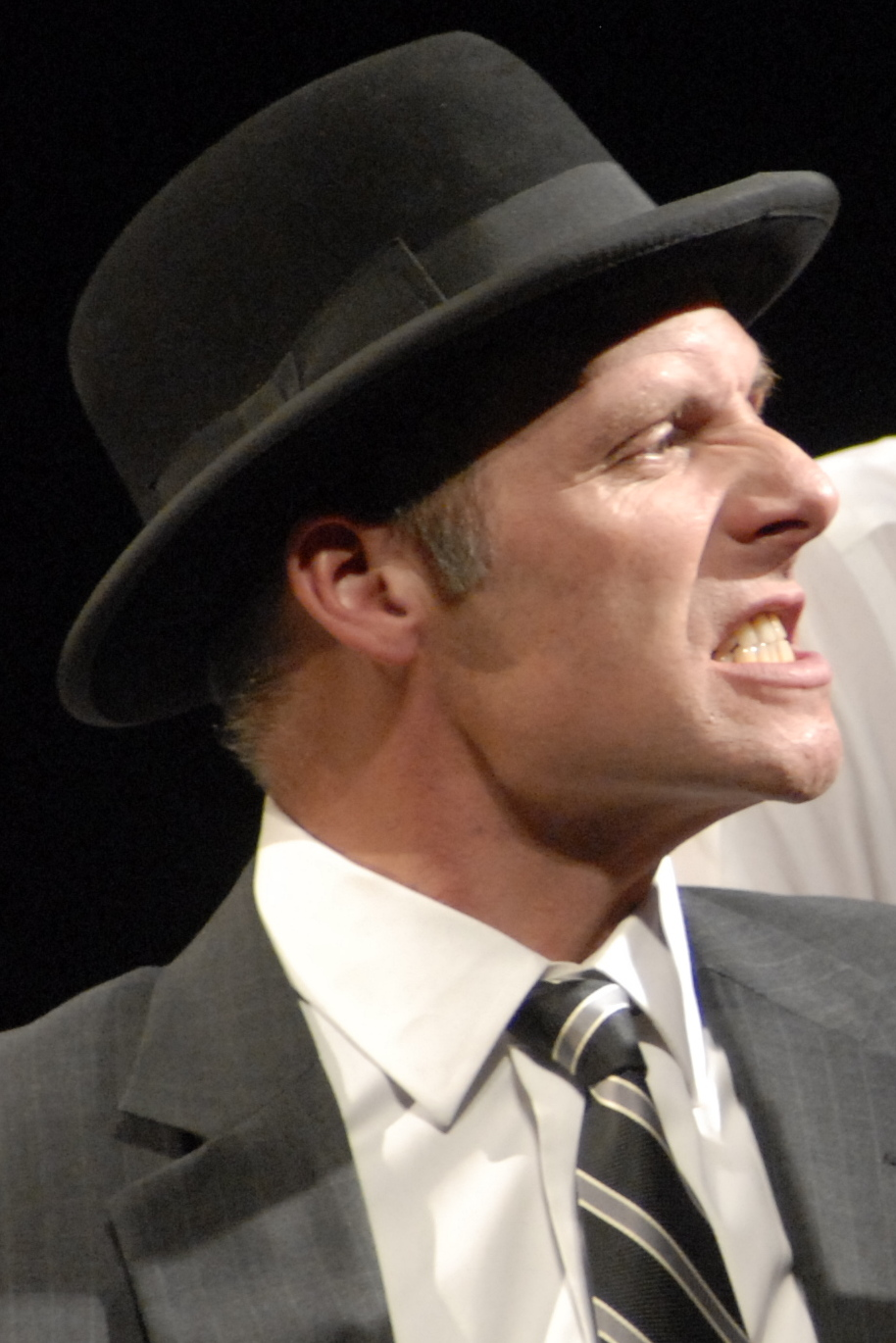
Bastián Bodenhöfer (1961–present)

- Pedro de la Barra
- Alicia Barrié
- Eduardo Barril
- Carmen Barros
- Paz Bascuñán
- Schlomit Baytelman
- Gloria Benavides
- Bastián Bodenhöfer
- Miranda Bodenhöfer
- José Bohr
- Graciela Bon
- Felipe Braun
- Nelson Brodt
- Edgardo Bruna
- Carmen Bunster
- Claudia Burr

== C ==
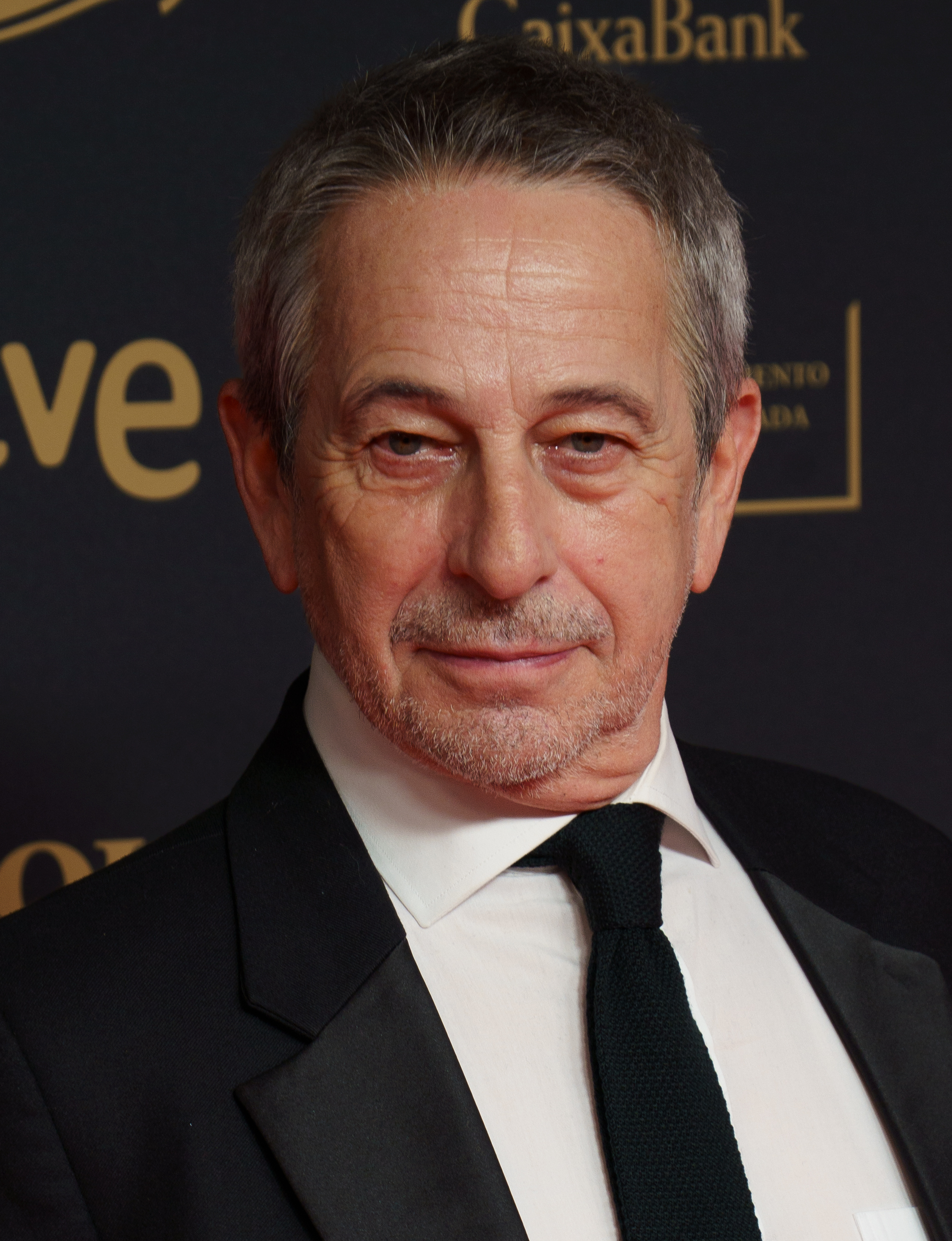
Alfredo Castro (1955–present)

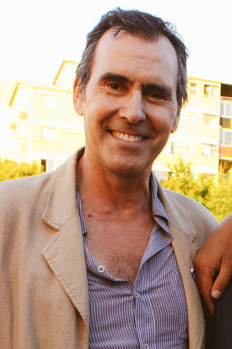
Cristián Campos (1956–present)

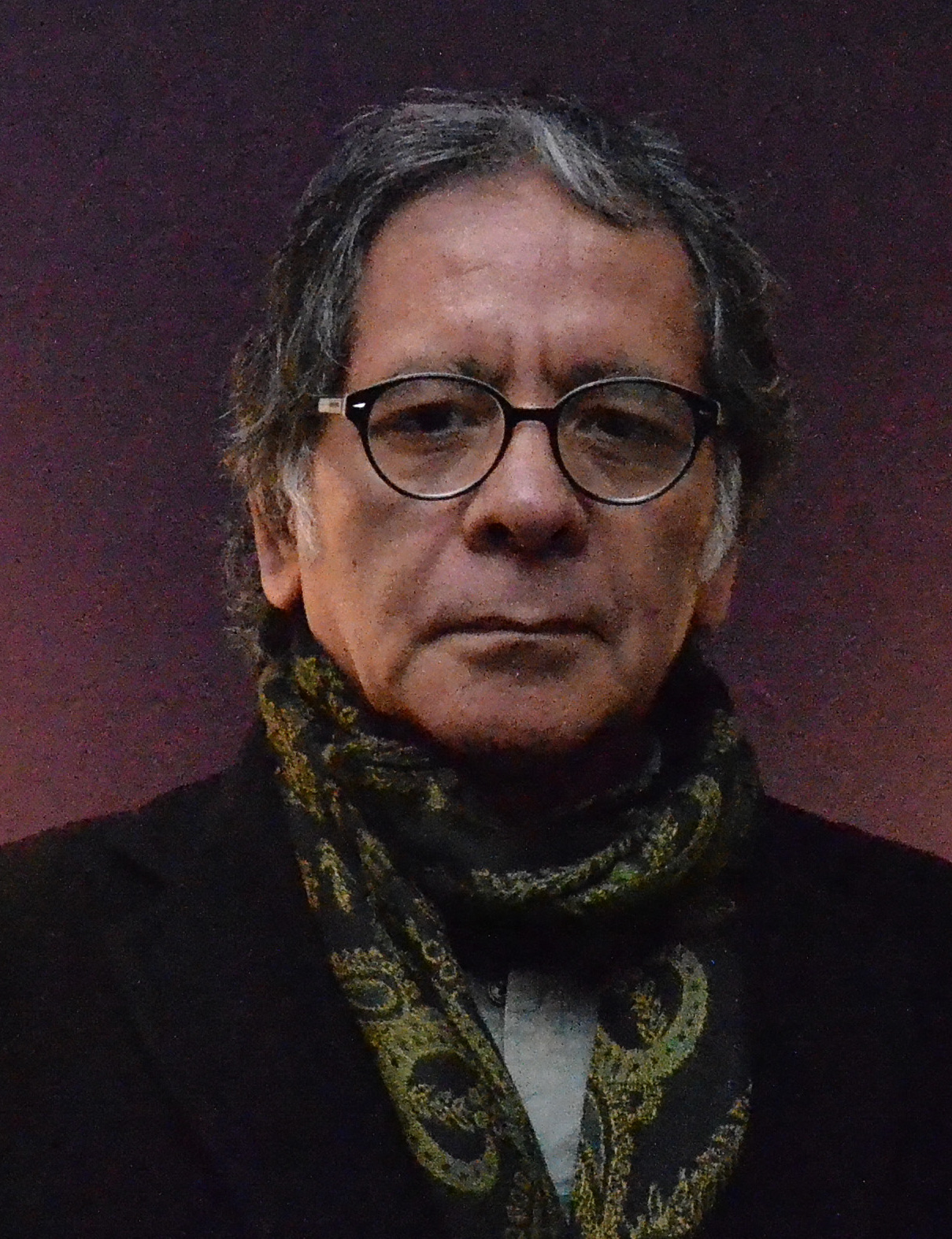
Patricio Contreras (1947–present)

- Santiago Cabrera
- César Caillet
- Adela Calderón
- Felipe Camiroaga
- Elsa del Campillo
- Cristián Campos
- Néstor Cantillana
- Alejandro Castillo
- Alfredo Castro
- Bélgica Castro
- Óscar Castro Ramírez
- Mónica Carrasco
- Claudia Celedón
- Oona Chaplin
- Claudia Conserva
- Javiera Contador
- Ángela Contreras
- Patricio Contreras
- Tiago Correa
- Elvira Cristi
- Íngrid Cruz
- Luciano Cruz-Coke
- Beto Cuevas
- Natalia Cuevas

== D ==
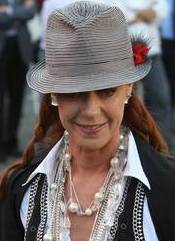
Claudia di Girolamo (1956–present)

- Tito Davison
- Mariana Derderian
- Claudia di Girolamo
- Mariana di Girolamo
- Carlos Díaz León
- Javiera Díaz de Valdés
- Luis Dubó
- Alejandra Dueñas

== E ==
- Luciana Echeverría
- Daniel Emilfork
- Álvaro Escobar
- Álvaro Espinoza

== F ==
- Carolina Fadic
- Juan Falcón
- Fernando Farías
- Ramón Farías
- Roberto Farías
- Nona Fernández
- Francisco Flores del Campo
- Alejandro Flores
- Amaya Forch
- Alejandra Fosalba
- Andrea Freund
- Rafael Frontaura de la Fuente
- Cristián de la Fuente

== G ==
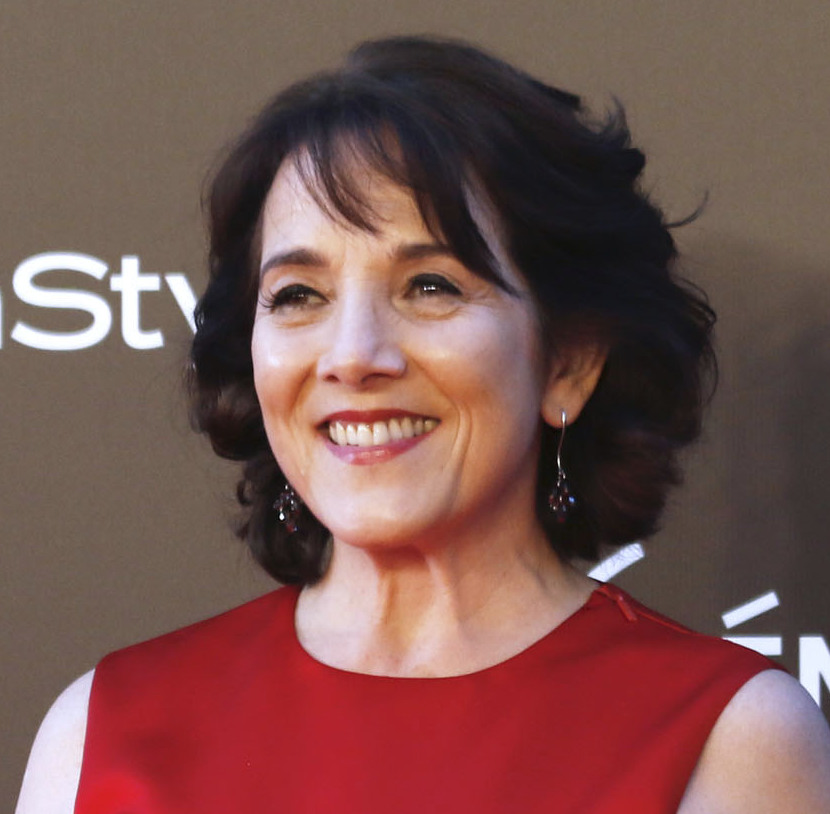
Paulina García (1960–present)

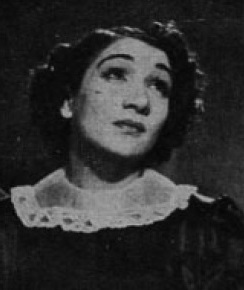
Ana González Olea (1915-2008)

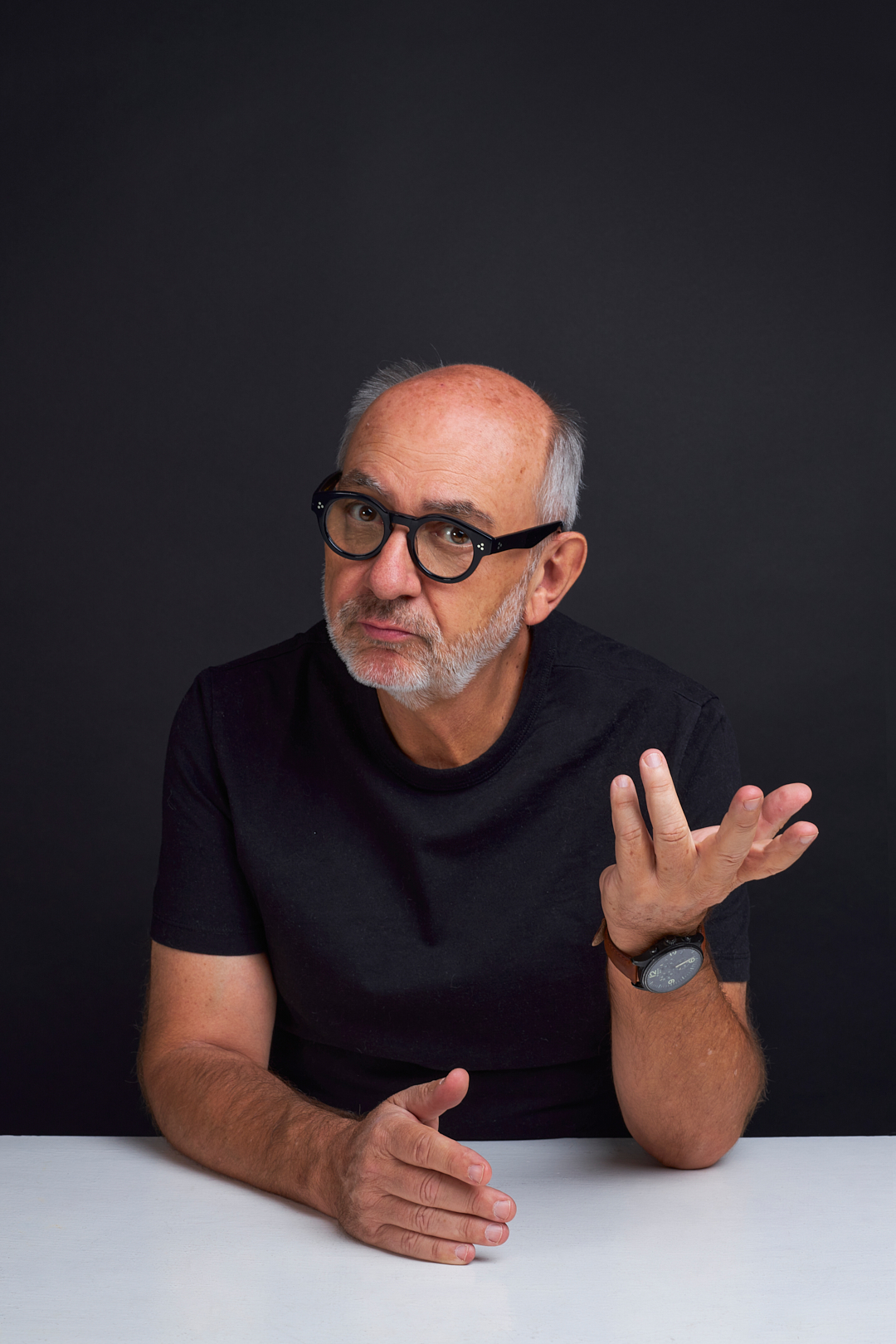
Luis Gnecco (1962–present).

- Liliana García
- Jorge Garcia
- Paulina García
- Cristián García-Huidobro
- Malú Gatica
- Francisca Gavilán
- Ana María Gazmuri
- Rebeca Ghigliotto
- Luis Gnecco
- Mónica Godoy
- Alejandro Goic
- Álvaro Gómez
- Ana González
- Coca Guazzini
- Catalina Guerra
- Juan José Gurruchaga
- Delfina Guzmán

== H ==
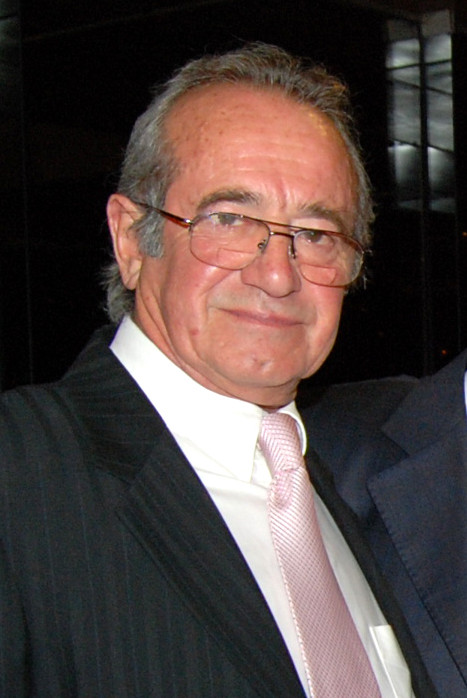
Sergio Hernández (1945–present)

- Gabriela Hernández
- Óscar Hernández
- Sergio Hernández
- Alejandra Herrera
- Constanza Herrero
- Consuelo Holzapfel
- Ximena Huilipán

== I ==
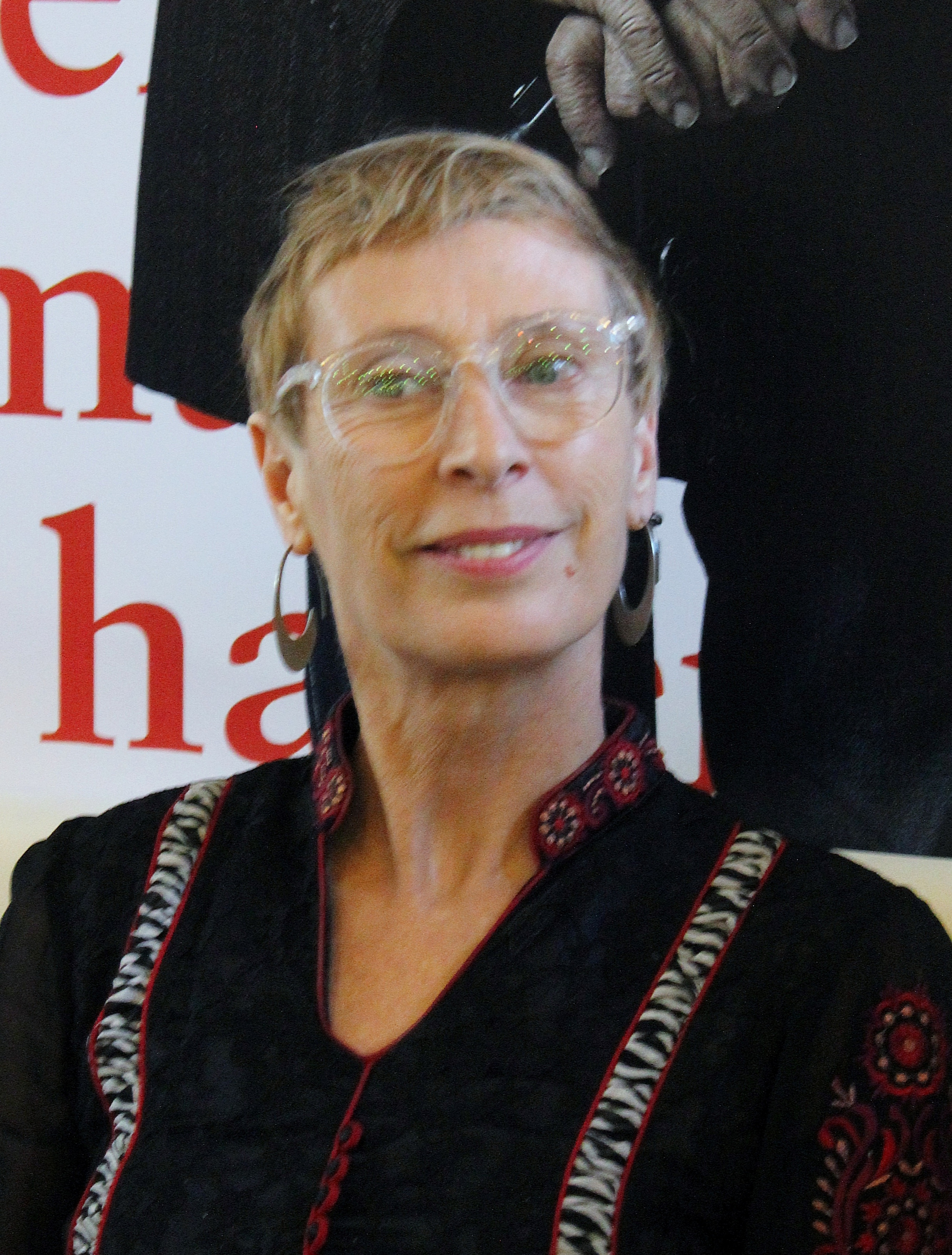
María Izquierdo (1960–present)

- Francisca Imboden
- Paz Irarrázabal
- Ingrid Isensee
- María Izquierdo
- Lorenza Izzo

== J ==
- Víctor Jara
- Grimanesa Jiménez
- Luz Jiménez
- Adan Jodorowsky
- Brontis Jodorowsky
- Alejandro Jodorowsky
- Julio Jung

== K ==
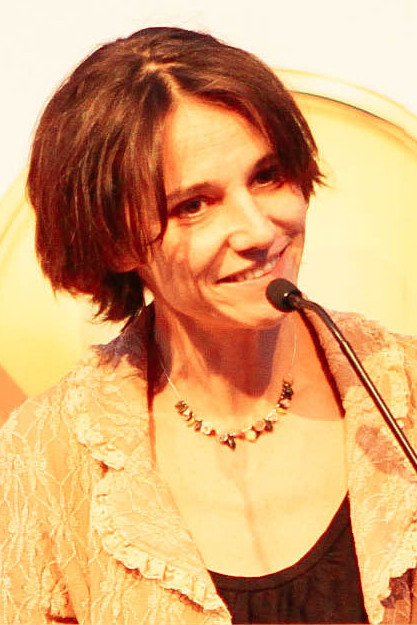
Aline Kuppenheim (1969–present)

- Anita Klesky
- Fernando Kliche
- Katty Kowaleczko
- Stefan Kramer
- Pablo Krögh
- Aline Kuppenheim

== L ==
- Solange Lackington
- Fernando Larraín
- Paola Lattus
- Mirella Latorre
- Coco Legrand
- Ariel Levy
- Blanca Lewin
- Francisca Lewin
- Elvira López
- Patricia López
- Mariana Loyola
- Paula Luchsinger

== M ==
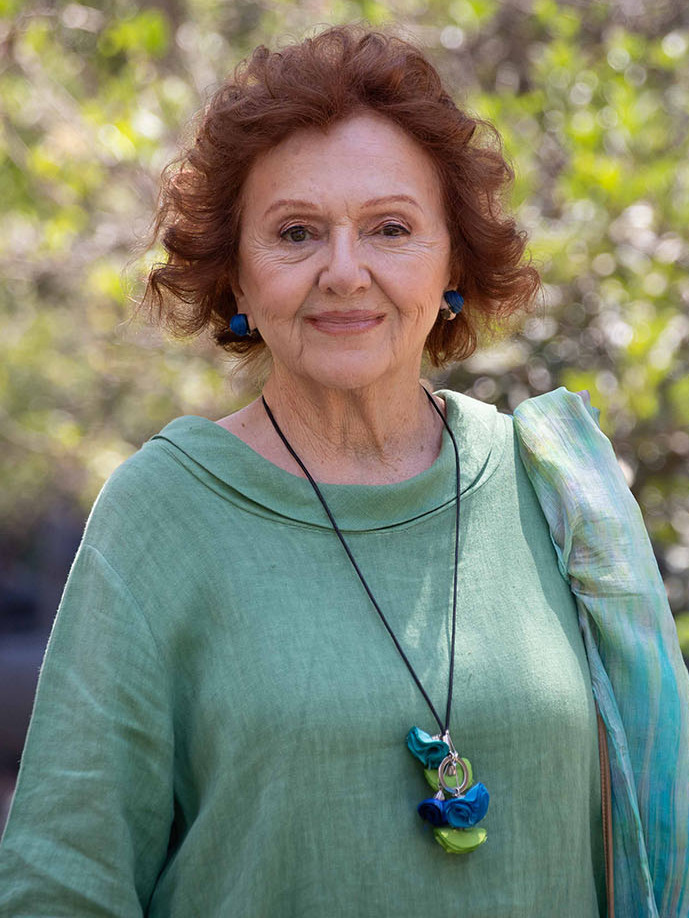
Gloria Munchmeyer (1938–present)

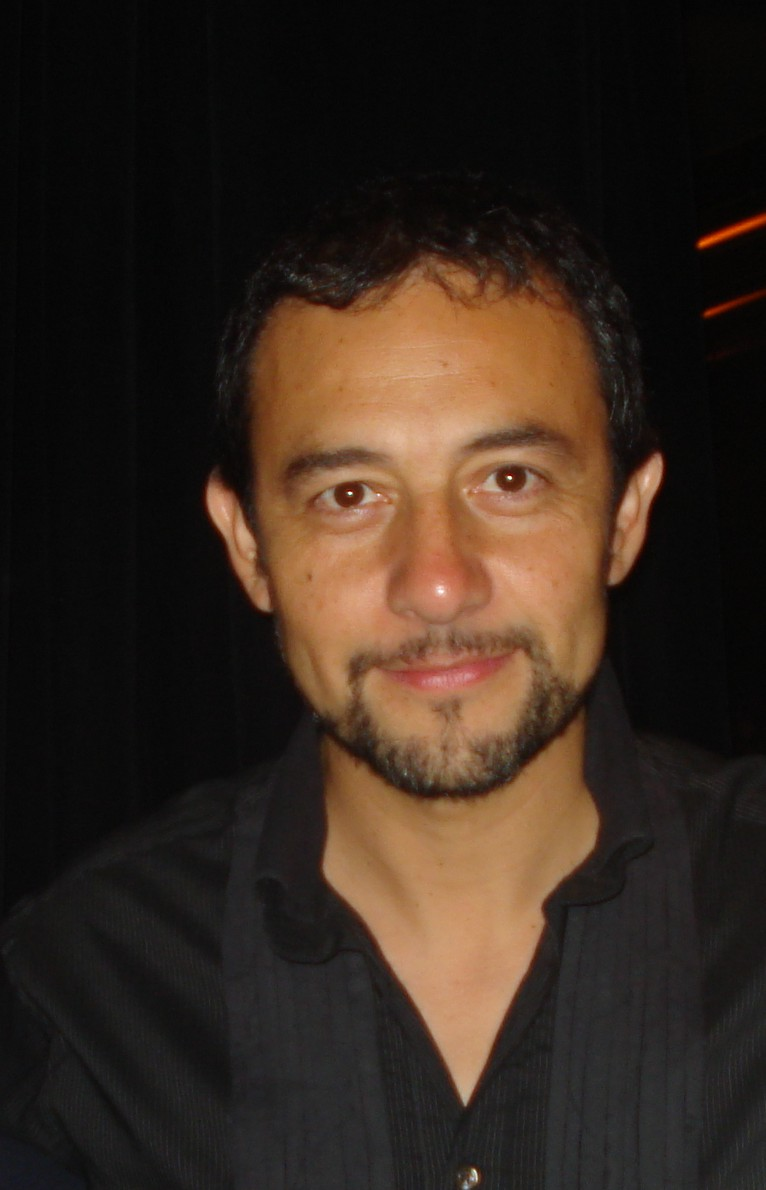
Daniel Muñoz (1966–present)

- María Maluenda
- Sebastián Mancilla
- Carolina Marzán
- María Luisa Mayol
- Manuela Martelli
- Yoya Martínez
- Ariel Mateluna
- Marcela Medel
- Gabriela Medina
- Hugo Medina
- Francisco Melo
- Francisca Merino
- Nelly Meruane
- Carolina Mestrovic
- Eyal Meyer
- Adelqui Migliar
- Julio Milostich
- Daniella Monet
- Andrea Molina
- Josefina Montané
- Cristina Montt
- Álvaro Morales
- Héctor Morales
- Elena Moreno
- Gloria Münchmeyer
- Renato Munster
- Daniel Muñoz
- Diego Muñoz
- Lautaro Murúa

== N ==
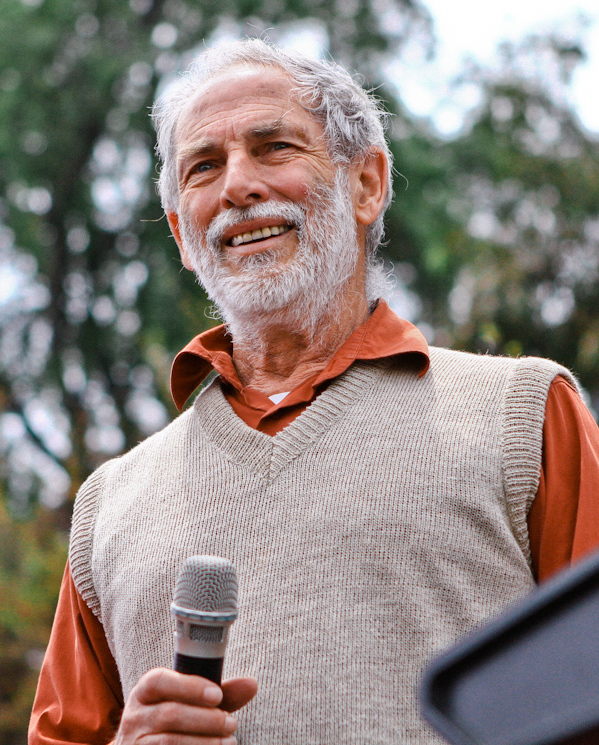
Hector Noguera (1937–2025)

- Amparo Noguera
- Héctor Noguera
- Matías Novoa

== O ==
- Sandra O'Ryan
- María Gracia Omegna
- Óscar Olavarría
- Gonzalo Olave
- Maite Orsini
- Marcela Osorio

== P ==
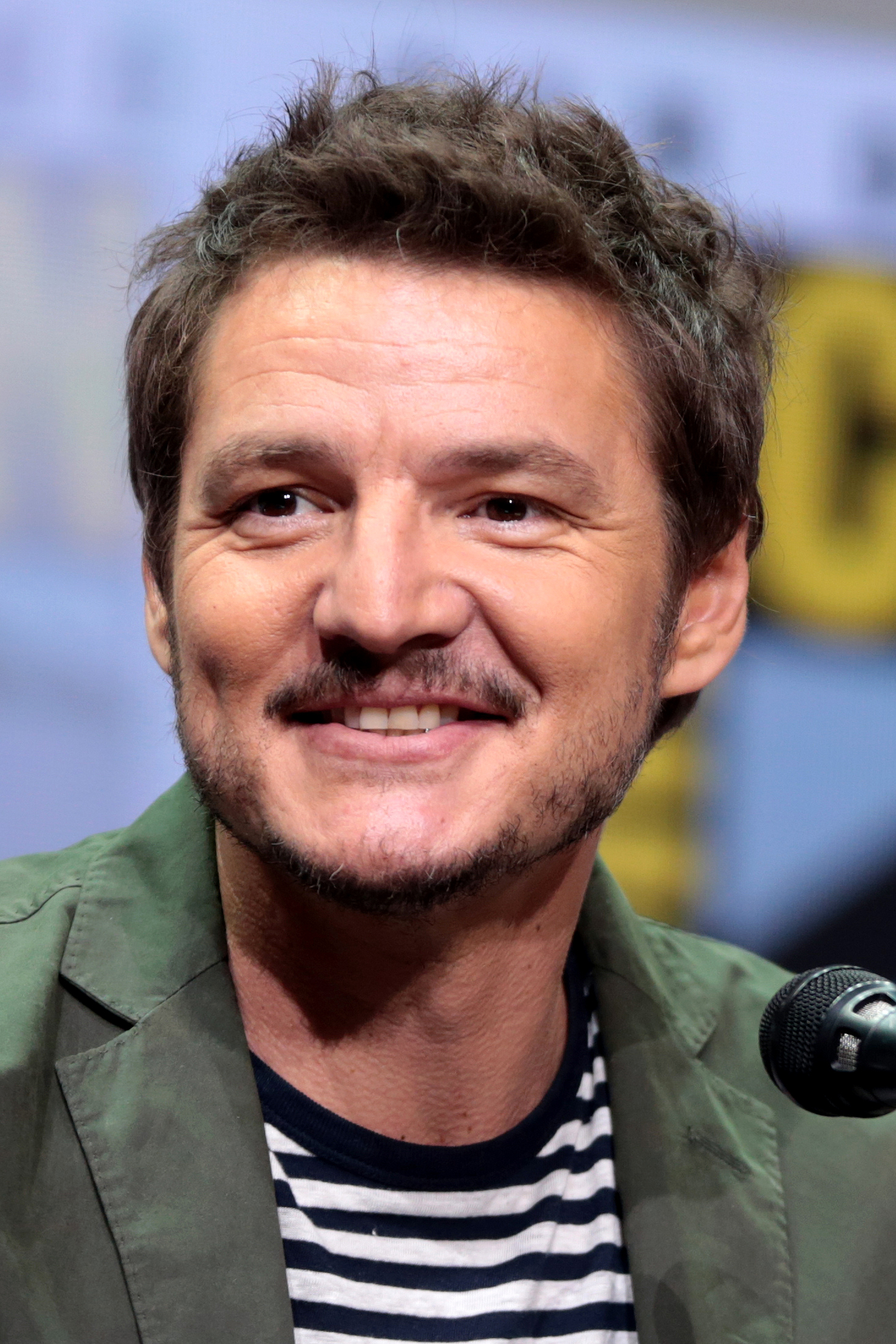
Pedro Pascal (1975–present)

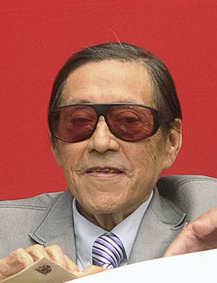
Jorge Pedreros (1942–2013)

- Cote de Pablo
- Andrés Palacios
- Catalina Palacios
- Myriam Palacios
- Roberto Parada
- Lux Pascal
- Pedro Pascal
- Jorge Pedreros
- Francisco Pérez-Bannen
- Mauricio Pesutic
- Constanza Piccoli
- Malucha Pinto
- Trinidad Piriz
- Roberto Poblete
- Valentina Pollarolo
- Blanca Pozas
- Antonio Prieto
- Gabriel Prieto
- Lorene Prieto
- María José Prieto
- Catalina Pulido

== Q ==
- Boris Quercia
- Alonso Quintero

== R ==
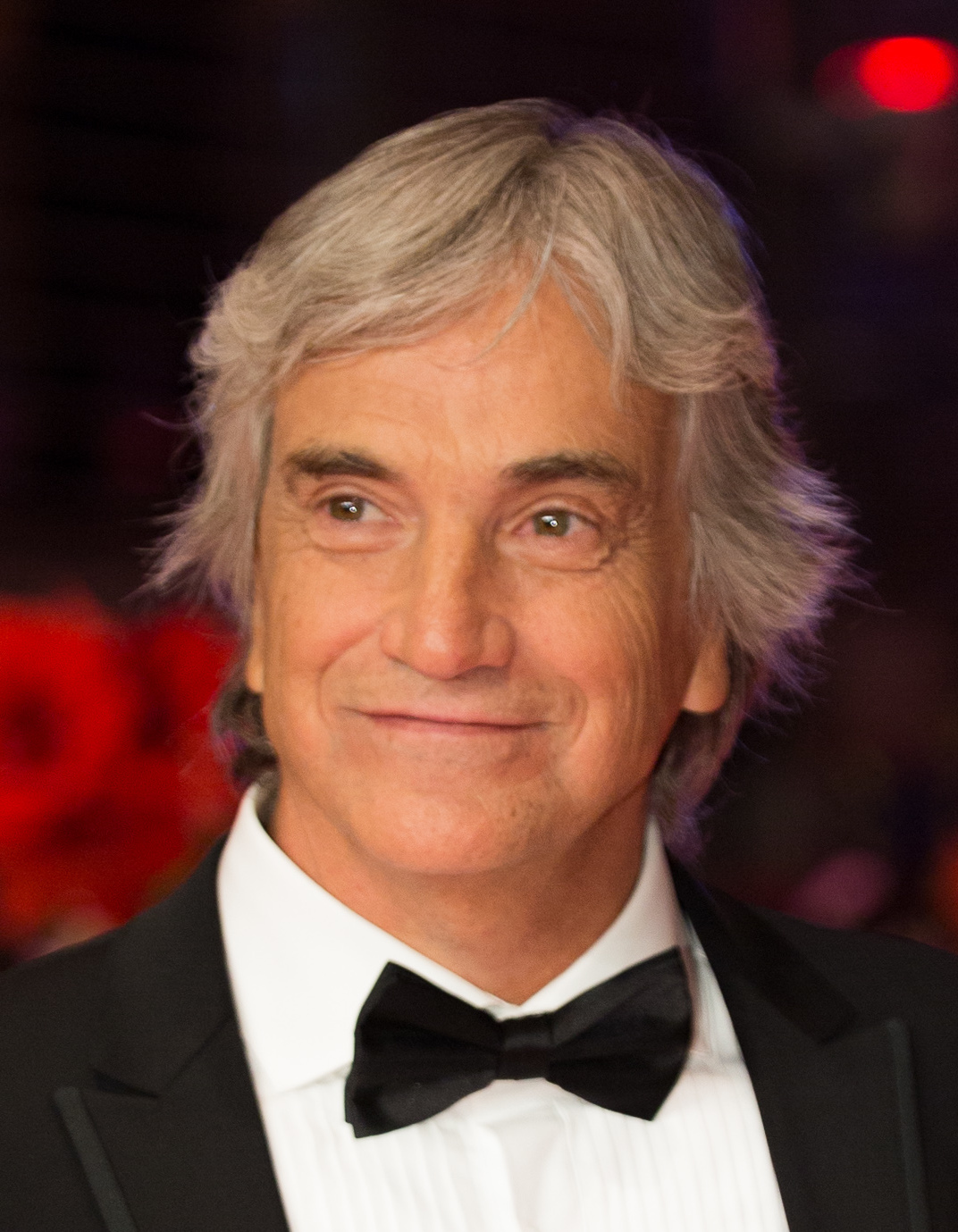
Francisco Reyes (1954–present)

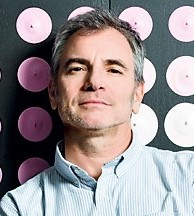
Álvaro Rudolphy (1964–present)

- Daniela Ramírez
- Eduardo Ravani
- Ana Reeves
- Eugenio Retes
- Francisco Reyes
- Teresita Reyes
- Carmina Riego
- Andrés Rillón
- Gladys del Río
- Antonella Ríos
- Patricia Rivadeneira
- Ximena Rivas
- Gonzalo Robles
- Alicia Rodríguez
- Mayte Rodríguez
- Viviana Rodríguez
- Marcelo Romo
- Shenda Román
- Denise Rosenthal
- Liliana Ross
- Álvaro Rudolphy
- Bárbara Ruiz-Tagle

== S ==
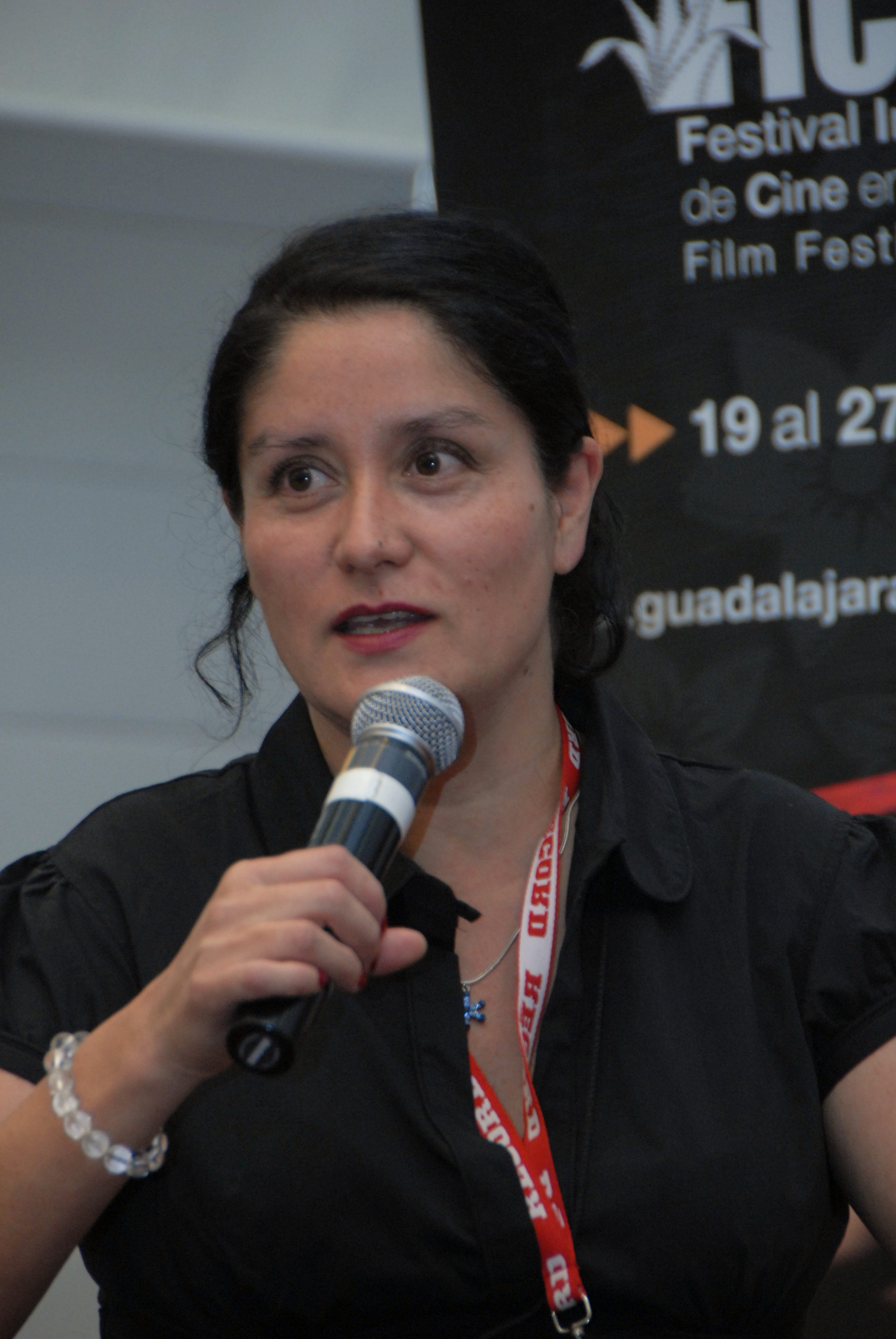
Catalina Saavedra (1968–present)

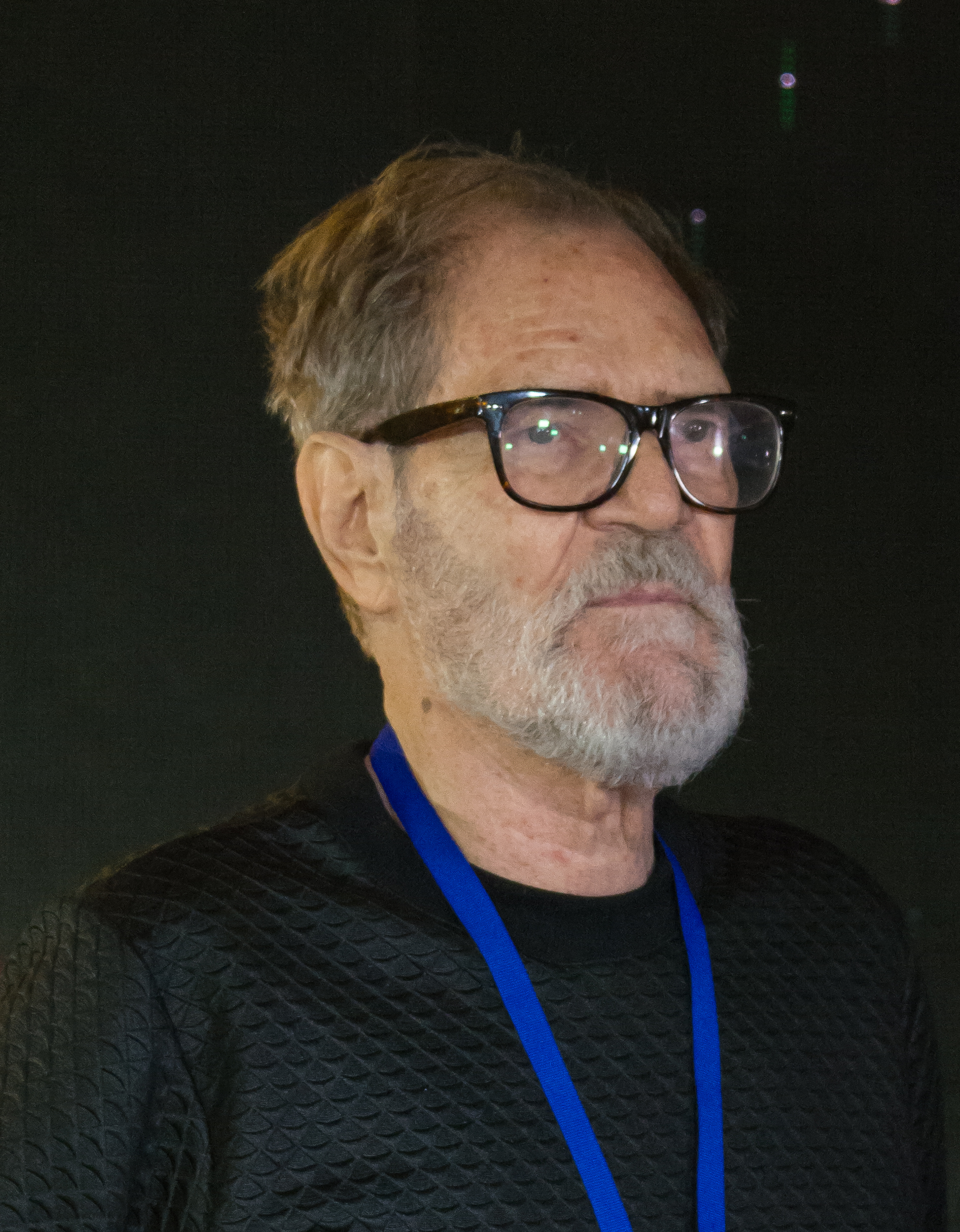
Alejandro Sieveking (1934–2020)

- Catalina Saavedra
- Katherine Salosny
- Marisela Santibáñez
- Antonia Santa María
- Silvia Santelices
- Valeria Sarmiento
- Augusto Schuster
- Pablo Schwarz
- José Secall
- Mara Sedini
- Willy Semler
- Rosita Serrano
- Nissim Sharim
- Pedro Sienna
- Alejandro Sieveking
- Esperanza Silva
- Belén Soto
- José Soza
- Karla Souza
- María Elena Swett

== T ==
- Marcial Tagle
- Sussan Taunton
- Alejandro Trejo
- Paola Troncoso

== U ==
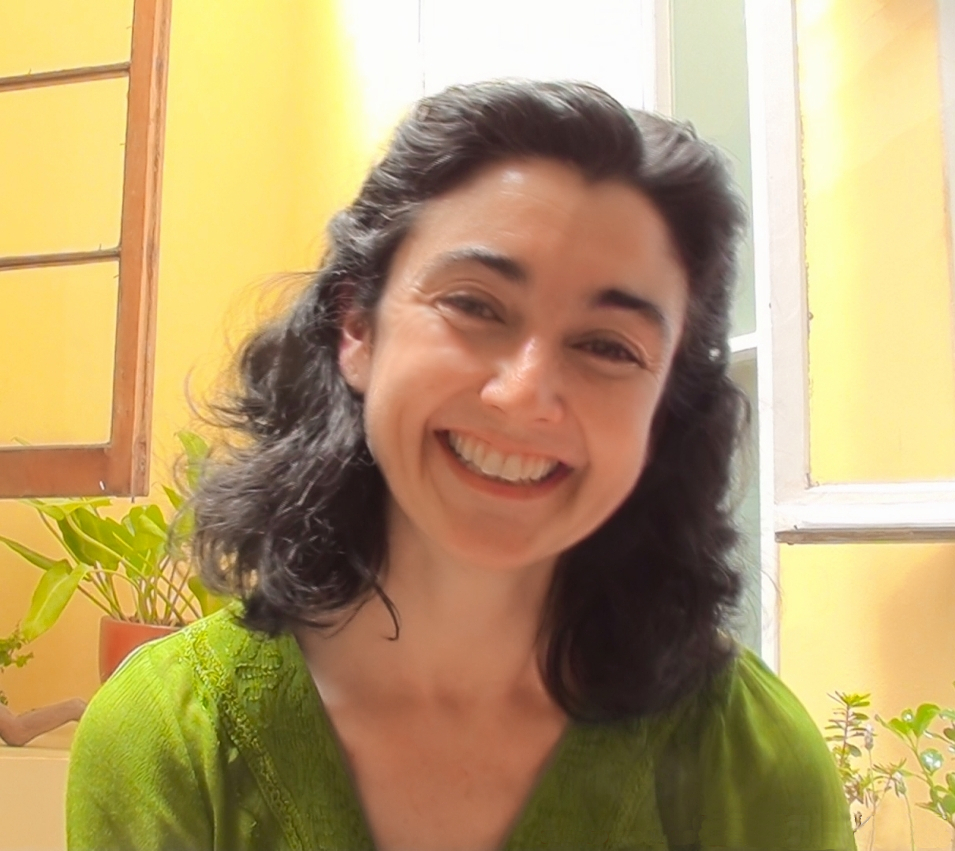
Paulina Urrutia (1969–present)

- Fernanda Urrejola
- Paulina Urrutia
- María José Urzúa

== V ==
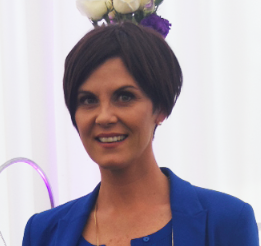
Paola Volpato (1969–present)

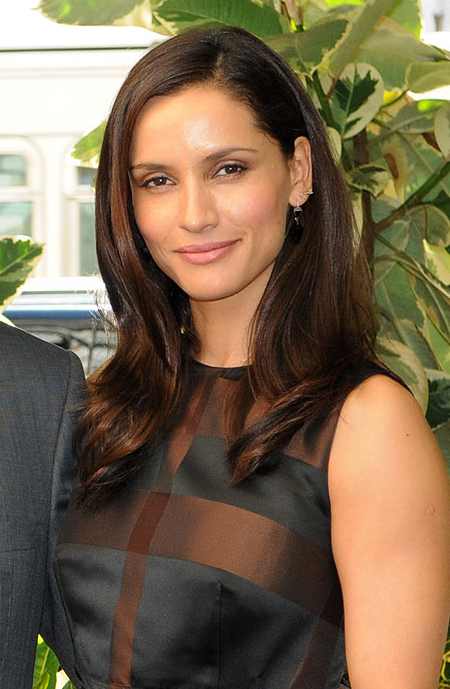
Leonor Varela (1972–present)

- Adriana Vacarezza
- Jaime Vadell
- Luz Valdivieso
- Gonzalo Valenzuela
- Loreto Valenzuela
- Roberto Vander
- Leonor Varela
- Valentina Vargas
- Guido Vecchiola
- Andrea Velasco
- Gabriela Velasco
- Mireya Véliz
- Benjamín Vicuña
- Ximena Vidal
- Violeta Vidaurre
- Tomás Vidiella
- Helvecia Viera
- Nelson Villagra
- Araceli Vitta
- Sonia Viveros
- Paola Volpato

== Z ==
- Jorge Zabaleta
- Marko Zaror
- Antonia Zegers
- Alex Zisis
- Elisa Zulueta

== See also ==
- List of Chilean films
- List of Chilean telenovelas
- Missing articles of Chilean actresses
