= Gloria Benavides =

Chilean actress, singer and comedian

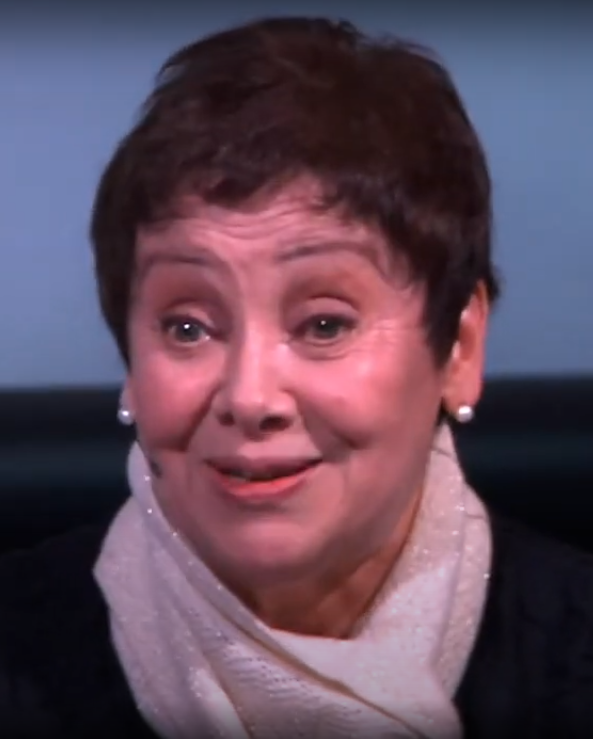
- Gloria Benavides in 2016
- Born: Gloria Angélica Benavides Nicolás; 5 April 1948 (age 78); Loncoche, Chile
- Occupations: comedian, actress, singer
- Years active: 1961–present

Gloria Angélica Benavides Nicolás (born April 5, 1948), is a Chilean actress, singer and comedian.

== Biography ==
=== Personal life ===
She was born in Loncoche in 1948, daughter of Juan Luis Benavides Oliva and Nieves Elena Nicolás Gacitúa. At the age of three she was left in the care of a family in the vicinity of Valdivia, due to a serious illness in her mother, which required treatment in Santiago, her older brother was left with a grandmother in the countryside. At the age of five, she traveled alone to Santiago to reunite with her mother.

At fifteen, she married another Chilean music idol, Pat Henry, who was eight years older. They had started their relationship during the tours of the radio program Discomanía, and their relationship was widely publicized by the nascent press of the heart of those years. The couple had two daughters, Cherie and Carol, and had a media rift in 1968.

At the age of 26 (1974), she again married Army Major Francisco Molina, who is the father of her son Joaquín. When they were separated in the 1980s, he was shot at a party in 1988, and it was a tragedy that forever marked the family and she has only spoken very little and on rare occasions, like in 2016, on the Vertigo TV show. Later, she would marry for the third time in 1985, a relationship that she lives at a distance.

=== Musical career ===
After her arrival in Santiago, Gloria Benavides, at just 13 years old, would record the song that would end up catapulting her to national fame, "la gotita", a composition by the prominent announcer Francisco "Gabito" Hernandez, the song would quickly reach number 1 of the radio rankings of the moment. Songs like "Pequeño amorcito" or "Prima o Poi" would further increase her popularity among the youth of the time. By the end of the 60s she would perhaps reach her best moment in the world of records, the hits "Balapapa" and "Patati Patata" were loud on the radio, keeping her in the first row of the country's music scene.

Starting in 1970, her songs would change their focus to youth love. Scottie Scott -a distinguished Chilean female composer- would be her main creative support, the hits "Porque no fui yo tu primer amor" "Princesita de luna" -of the composers JC Gil and Carlos Alegría- "Los enamorados de siempre" and "Muchacho malo" positioned her as the most successful female artist of the moment, and a regular guest on the already established Chilean television.

Little by little, she would move away from the musical spectrum to dedicate herself to completing her studies and focusing on more personal projects.

=== Acting career ===
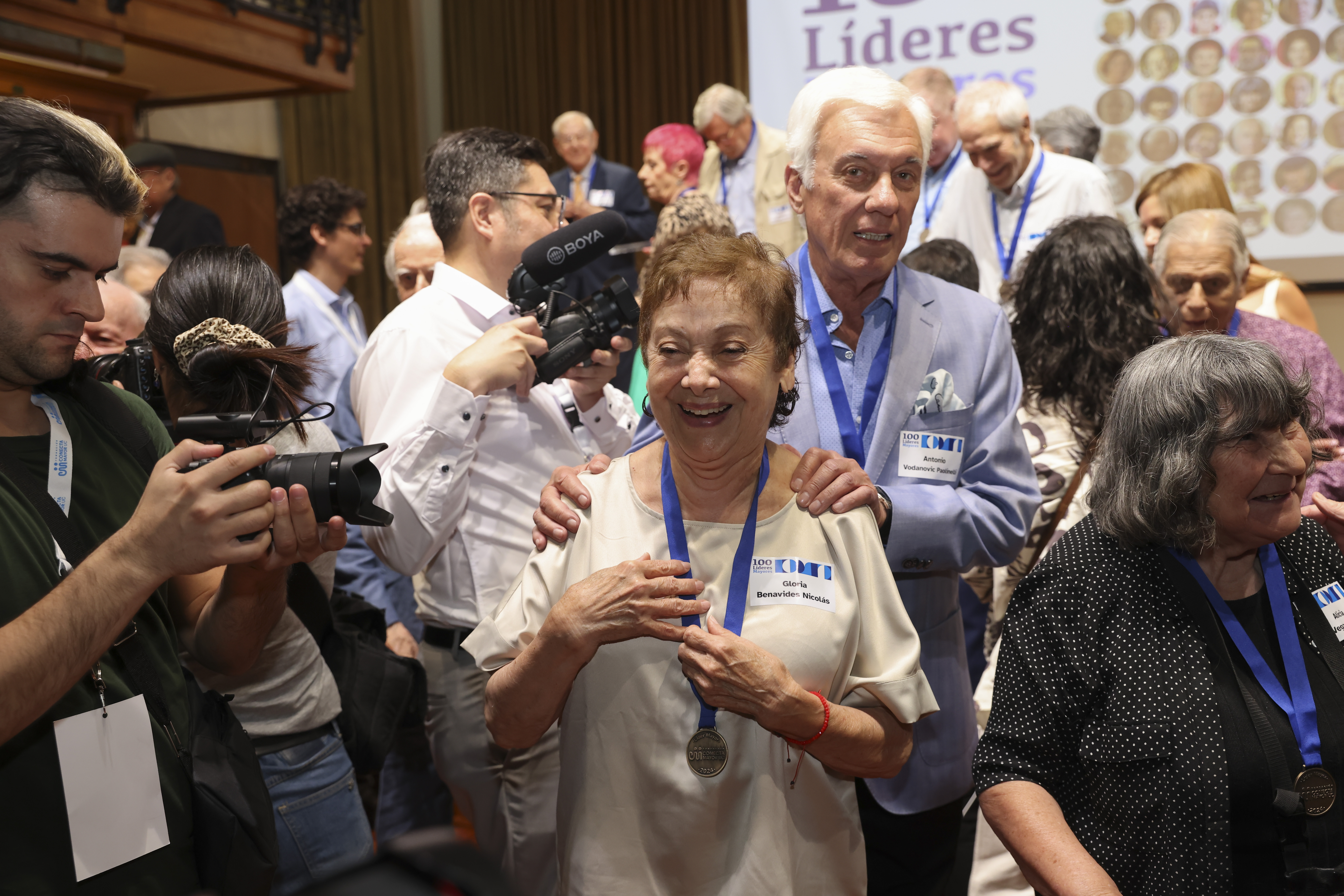
Benavides at the 2024 Pontificia Universidad Católica de Chile Senior Leaders Recognition Ceremony

She developed as a comedy actress participating in the iconic comedy show Jappening con ja between 1978 and 1989 alongside Eduardo Ravani, Jorge Pedreros, and Fernando Alarcón. Among her most prominent characters was "Gertrudis", a submissive and hardworking secretary of The Office sketch. "La Tía Tute" and "La Cuatro Dientes" were also some of the most recognizable characters. In 1985, she participated and hosted the stellar El show de Gloria on Televisión Nacional de Chile and a children's program called Valle Alegría, which featured prestigious actors within her cast, such as Ramón Farías and Patricio Torres.

She was also a regular comedian on the program Sábado Gigante since 1975, produced by Canal 13 in Chile, and later by Univisión network in Miami, United States, from 1986 until the last episode of the program on Saturday, September 19, 2015. Her last project in Chile was the sitcom Vecinos al tres y al cuatro, broadcast by Channel 13.

"La Cuatro Dientes", also known as "La Cuatro" outside of Chile, is the most famous humorous character performed by Gloria Benavides. This character with blond hair, a red miniskirt, polka dot blouse, socks and clogs, was born in 1975 on the television show Sabados Gigantes (as the show was known in Chile), initially as Mandolino's girlfriend. However, the character became an independent and stable number of the program, since Don Francisco became a companion for Benavides' routines. This is how "La Cuatro Dientes" became popular, also being invited in several occasions to the Viña del Mar International Song Festival with "Anthony" (Antonio Vodanovic), as she called him. She is also classic in her interpretation of "La copucha" (copucha in Chile means gossip), a song written by the late Chilean singer-songwriter Nicanor Molinare, in which she was ironic through verses about national reality.

In 2006, "La Cuatro" won the "Best Humorous Character Award" in the history of Chile in the program Chile elige (TVN), carried out within the framework of the Bicentennial of Chile.

== Discography ==
=== Studio albums ===
- Gloria Benavides, Sus primeros éxitos (1963)
- De Gloria Benavides a los enamorados de siempre (1968–73)
- Gloria Benavides (1972)

=== Collaborations ===
- La Nueva Ola en 30 grandes éxitos (1997)
- Las grandes canciones chilenas del siglo XX (1999)
- 24 inmortales de la Nueva Ola (2000)
- Nueva Ola. Más inmortales (2005)
- Show de la Nueva Ola (2008)

== Filmography ==
=== Television ===
- Jappening con ja (1978-1981, 1984–1986, 1988–1989)
- Sábado gigante (1975-1978, 1982–1984, 1987, 1991–2015)
- El show de Gloria (1984-1985)
- Mediomundo (1987)
- Valle Alegría (1981)
- Vecinos al 3 y al 4 (2007)

=== Film ===
- Hasta en las mejores familias (1994), as Jacqueline.
- Velódromo (2010), as labor psychologist.
