= María Urzúa =

María Urzúa may refer to:

- María Guadalupe Urzúa Flores (1912-2004), Mexican politician
- María José Urzúa (born 1983), Chilean actress
