= Gladys del Río =

Chilean actress and comedian (1941–2021)

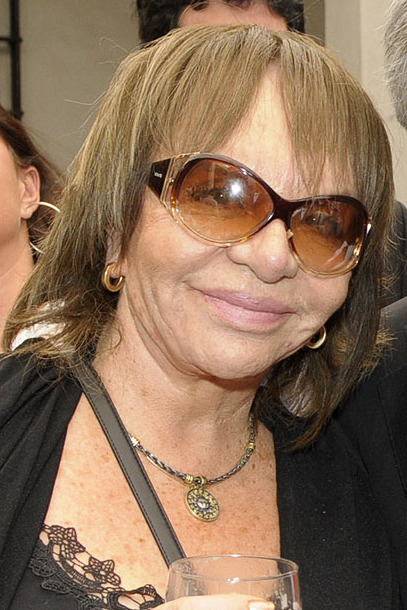
- del Río in 2011
- Born: Gladys Yolanda del Río Uribe; 29 December 1941; Santiago, Chile
- Died: 30 October 2021 (aged 79); Santiago, Chile
- Occupations: Comedian, actor

Gladys Yolanda del Río Uribe (December 29, 1941 – October 30, 2021) was a Chilean actress and comedian.

== Biography ==
She married fellow actor and musician Jorge Pedreros in 1967, with whom she had a daughter called Claudia. During those years, del Río was studying at the Technical Pedagogical Institute of the State Technical University (UTE). There, she took her first steps on the stage, since she was one of the founders of Teknos, the university theater, where she acted alongside Sonia Viveros, Gabriela Medina and Luis Alarcón.

In 1982 she was part of the cast of the telenovela De cara al mañana on Televisión Nacional de Chile (TVN). However, she became recognized the following year when she joined the humorous television program Jappening con Ja, which had been created by her husband along with Fernando Alarcón and Eduardo Ravani in the late 1970s. In the program, del Río stood out for her character as "Señora Pochi" in the popular sketch "La Oficina", as well as other characters such as "Mama Show", "Tranquilina", "Yolanda Motocinos", "Maruja" or the "Mamá de Pequitas" after more than 20 years on the show.

In 1989 she acted in the movie Todo por nada, directed by Alfredo Lamadrid. In addition to Jappening con ja, del Río participated in the programs El show de Pepito TV and A la suerte de la olla, both broadcast on Canal 13 in 2001.

She was widowed in 2013 after a long illness of her husband Jorge Pedreros.

She died on October 30, 2021, at age 79, due to heart failure.
