= Caleta del sol =

2014 Chilean telenovela

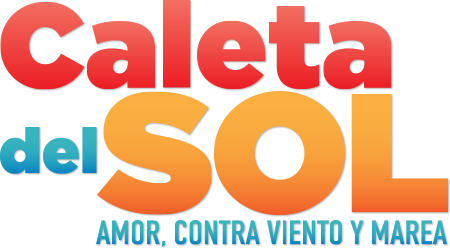
- Logo
- Genre: Romance; Drama
- Created by: Carlos Oporto
- Written by: Carlos Oporto; Priscilla Rodriguez; Jorge Peña; Marianela Fuenzalida
- Directed by: Claudio López de Lérida
- Creative director: Alex Bowen C.
- Starring: Carolina Arregui; Gonzalo Vivanco; Francisco Melo; Daniela Lhorente; Mayte Rodríguez; Jorge Arecheta; Gabriela Medina; Nicolás Oyarzún; Patricio Strahovsky
- Country of origin: Chile
- Original language: Spanish
- No. of episodes: 67

Production
- Executive producer: Eduardo Alegría Celaya
- Producer: Chyntia Rojas
- Production locations: Chañaral de Aceituno, Chile
- Production company: Televisión Nacional de Chile

Original release
- Network: TVN
- Release: October 20, 2014 – January 21, 2015

Related
- El amor lo manejo yo; Matriarcas

Caleta del Sol was a 2014 Chilean telenovela produced and broadcast by TVN.

Carolina Arregui, Gonzalo Vivanco and Francisco Melo are the leading roles, with Gabriela Medina, Nicolás Oyarzún, Daniela Lhorente and Karla Melo as the antagonist.

== Cast ==
- Carolina Arregui as Elena Aránguiz.
- Gonzalo Vivanco as Ignacio Cox.
- Francisco Melo as Crescente Maturana Gutierrez.
- Daniela Lhorente as Mariana Sandoval.
- Luis Alarcón as Nicasio "Don Lobo" Mardones.
- Mayte Rodríguez as Bárbara Hidalgo Aránguiz.
- Renata Bravo as Clara Montecinos.
- Jorge Arecheta as Gerardo "Lobo Chico" Luna Paredes.
- Valentina Carvajal as Catalina "Chica K" Infante.
- Matías Assler as Vicente "Vicho" Foster.
- Patricio Strahovsky as Francisco Hidalgo.
- Ignacio Susperreguy as Nicolás Hidalgo Aránguiz.
- Nicolás Oyarzún as Gabriel Opazo.
- Karla Melo as Fabiana Cordero.
- Tatiana Molina as Lidia San Juan.
- Grimanesa Jiménez as Miriam Paredes.
- Andrés Velasco as Federico Galván.
- Gabriel Cañas as Darío "Chungungo" Jérez San Juan.
- Erto Pantoja as Emilio Viveros.
- Gabriela Medina as Juana Gutiérrez.
- Silvana Salgueiro as Estrella Jérez San Juan.
- Macarena Teke as Sandra Soto Montecinos.
- Mario Bustos as Mario Luna.
- Roberto Prieto as Padre Juan Eduardo "Lalo" Pascal.
- Camila Laso as Vanesa.
- Marcelo Gutiérrez as Felipe.
- Elisa Alemparte as Maribel.
- Nicolás Platovsky as Sebastián.
- Daniel de la Vega as Agustin
