= Pobre novio =

#PobreNovio
- Genre: Telenovela
- Created by: Alejandro Cabrera
- Written by: María Eugenia Rencoret
- Directed by: Matías Stagnaro; Bárbara Della Schiava
- Starring: Etienne Bobenrieth; Montserrat Ballarin; Diego Muñoz; Francisca Walker; Hector Noguera; Sigrid Alegria; Carolina Arregui; Claudio Arredondo; Claudio Castellón
- Opening theme: "Canción Bonita" by Carlos Vives and Ricky Martin
- Country of origin: Chile
- Original language: Spanish
- No. of seasons: 1
- No. of episodes: 172

Production
- Executive producers: Daniela Demicheli; Vania Portilla
- Producer: Claudia Cazanave
- Editor: Nelson Valdés
- Camera setup: Multi-camera
- Production companies: Mega; Chilefilms

Original release
- Network: Mega
- Release: August 9, 2021 – June 7, 2022

Related
- Pobre novio (Peruvian TV series)

#PobreNovio is a Chilean telenovela created by Alejandro Cabrera for Mega. It aired from August 9, 2021 to June 7, 2022. It stars Etienne Bobenrieth, Montserrat Ballarín, Francisca Walker, Diego Muñoz, Francisca Walker, Hector Noguera, Sigrid Alegria, Carolina Arregui, Claudio Arredondo, and Claudio Castellón.

== Plot ==
Santiago Garcia is abandoned by his bride on their wedding day. The image of the bride taking off on a motorcycle quickly becomes viral and has shocked the city. Santiago becomes a celebrity and the most coveted bachelor in the city when the hashtag #PobreNovio (#PoorHusband) becomes a trending topic, a status that makes a businessman offer him the deal of his life: to raffle him as a husband to women who want to marry him.

== Cast ==
- Etienne Bobenrieth as Santiago García Rossi
- Montserrat Ballarín as Francisca Thompson
- Francisca Walker as Pamela Donoso Cruz
- Diego Muñoz as Eduardo Santander
- Héctor Noguera as Arturo Thompson
- Sigrid Alegría as Betty Cruz
- Carolina Arregui as Vilma Rossi
- Clemente Rodríguez as Iván Donoso Cruz
- Claudio Arredondo as César García
- Claudio Castellón as Johnny Videla
- María José Necochea as Mónica Olavarría
- Teresita Reyes as Bella Martínez
- Alfred Borner as Marco García Rossi
- Nathalie Vera as Génesis Márquez
- Maira Bodenhöfer as Sara
- Catalina del Río as Manuela Santander
- Alexander Solórzano as José Gregorio Márquez
- Fernanda Finsterbusch as Camila
- Mireya Sotoconil as Mirta
- Melissa Brandt as Ximena
- Luz Valdivieso as Alicia Aguilera
- Mabel Farías as Norma
- Katty Kowaleczko as Stella Valderrama
- Claudia Pérez as Graciela López

== Ratings ==
Season	Episodes	First aired		Last aired	
Season	Episodes	Date	Rating (in points)	Date	Rating (in points)
1	172	August 9, 2021	23.6	June 7, 2021	22.6
