= Los Twisters =

Chilean rock 'n' roll band, formed in 1961

- Origin: Santiago, Chile
- Genres: Rock and roll
- Years active: 1961–1966
- Past members: Luis Dimas; Fernando Allende; Jorge Toscano; Franz Benko; Jorge Pedreros

Los Twisters (English: The Twisters) was a Chilean rock 'n' roll band, formed in 1961.

== History ==
Los Twisters was one of the first South American bands which recorded twist songs. The band originated in the early 1960s after Los Lyons broke up. The band was highly influenced by Bill Haley, Chubby Checker and Elvis Presley.

From their beginnings, the band had Luis Dimas as lead vocalist and they had their first successful singles: "Penas juveniles", Caprichitos, Me recordarás, Sueña and "Mi secreto". In 1963 it was selected as the most popular band in Chile; but it didn't continued so much, because the next year Cecilia weed it to them, inducing the band to emigrate to Argentina. In Argentina, the band was quite successful, and Luis Dimas became so popular, and they wanted to dissolve in 1966. After they broke up, the band lost popularity until they released their unique album, El show de Los Twisters.

== Members ==
- Luis Dimas - lead vocals
- Fernando Allende - drums
- Jorge Toscano - bass
- Franz Benko - guitar
- Jorge Pedreros - accordion
