= Feroz (TV series) =

- Title card
- Genre: Horror; Mystery; Thriller
- Written by: Jonathan Cuchacovich, Sergio Díaz, Claudia Villarroel, Marcelo Castañón, Eduardo Pavez Goye, José Fonseca, Rodrigo Fernández
- Directed by: Roberto Rebolledo
- Starring: Cristián Campos, Ignacio Garmendia, Tamara Acosta, Patricia López, Manuela Martelli, Carolina Arregui
- Opening theme: "Como un Lobo" (Miguel Bosé)
- Country of origin: Chile
- Original language: Spanish
- No. of episodes: 122

Production
- Producer: Sebastián Freund

Original release
- Network: Canal 13
- Release: March 15 – September 6, 2010

Feroz (international title: Fierce) is a Chilean telenovela broadcast on Canal 13. It broadcast was initially scheduled to start from February 28, 2010, but was postponed until March 8 due to the February 27 earthquake that caused massive damage in Chile.

== Cast ==
- Cristián Campos as Guillermo Bernard
- Ignacio Garmendia as Leonardo "Leo" Cruz
- Tamara Acosta as Soledad Gutiérrez
- Patricia López as Kiara Montero Main heroine, main villain
- Manuela Martelli as Amanda Carrera
- Carolina Arregui as Carmen Ramírez
- Blanca Lewin as Ángela Carrera
- Mario Horton as Pablo Gutiérrez
- María José Bello as Monserrat Tagle
- Cristóbal Tapia-Montt as Damián Cruz
- Pablo Schwartz as Jacinto Fonseca
- Lorena Bosch as Mónica Parráguez / Sofía Brunet
- Ramón Llao as René Sanhueza
- Lorene Prieto as Olga Bolados
- Juan Falcón as Tomás Hernández
- Elisa Zulueta as Valentina "Tina" Sanhueza
- Carolina Paulsen as Rosa Telías
- Francisco Gormaz as Ignacio "Nacho" Irarrázabal
- Catalina González as Ana Karen Telías
- Alfredo Allende as Jorge "Coke" Alfaro
- Belén Soto as Isidora Tagle Ramírez
- Simón Gelsich as Benjamín Cruz
- Tomás Verdejo as Gabriel Hernández
- Mayte Rodríguez as Lorena Salazar
- Ingrid Parra as Gloria "Yoya" Hernández
- Agustín Moya as Elías "El loco" Carrera

=== Special participations ===
- Pablo Krögh as Andrés Cruz
- Felipe Álvarez as Jairo
- Luciana Echeverría as Danae Suicx
- José Secall as Hugo Navarro
- Maria Elena Duvauchelle as Marta Soto
- Peggy Cordero as Chepa
- Sonia Mena as Renata
- Mauricio Diocares as Eric Molina
- Leonor Varela as Laura Palma
- Aldo Bernales as Perro Inostroza
- Eduardo Topelberg as Atila
- Isidora Cabezón as Profesora
- Araceli Vitta as Adriana Cooper
- Alessandra Guerzoni as Bethania McLean
- Rodrigo Achondo as Rómulo
- Alex Zisis as Gonzalo Tagle
- Julio César Serrano as Barman
- Eyal Meyer as Jean Pierre

== See also ==
- Martín Rivas
- Manuel Rodríguez
