= Su nombre es Joaquín =

- Genre: soap opera / Suspense & Thriller
- Written by: Victor Carrasco, Jaime Morales, Carlos Oporto, David Bustos
- Directed by: Maria Eugenia Rencoret
- Starring: Alvaro Rudolphy; Francisco Perez-Bannen; Mauricio Pesutic
- Country of origin: Chile
- Original languages: Spanish; English
- No. of episodes: 87

Production
- Camera setup: Multicamera

Original release
- Network: TVN; Columbia Broadcasting System(USA Only)
- Release: 5 October 2011 – 5 March 2012

Su Nombre Es Joaquin (in English: His name is Joaquin) is a 2011 Chilean soap opera produced and broadcast by TVN.

== Plot ==
Valle Azul (Blue Valley) is northern Chilean town bringing clear skies and is a place that arriving in that madhouse called La Comunidad (The Community) led by Joaquin Arellano (Alvaro Rudolphy), who has three wives Lola, Julia, Carolina and other youths, whom also live with calm, meditations and spiritual preparation for the end of the world. The other side is the Valle Azul Hospital worked by Alonso Montero (Francisco Perez-Bannen), who falls in love with Magdalena Silva and later married to Laura Mardones, but their marriage ended in divorce. The City Hall is led by Raul, who is mayor of Valle Azul, helping the citizens to rebuild the town after the earthquake and the volcanic, which struck in the beginning. The family hotel is the home of Dioniso Silva (Mauricio Pesutic), who abused his lovely daughter, Dolores and turned his family to a disaster.

== Cast ==
- Álvaro Rudolphy as Joaquin Arellano, leader of the Youth Community near Valle Azul, killed by Alonso
- Luciana Echeverría as Magdalena Silva
- Francisco Pérez-Bannen as Alonso Montero, a doctor of the Valle Azul Hospital, fell in love with Magdalena
- Paola Volpato as Lola Briceno, Joaquin's first wife
- Alejandra Fosalba as Julia Ossa, Joaquin's partner and second wife
- Antonia Santa María as Carolina Ortega, Joaquin's third wife, later relationship with Dante
- Matías Oviedo as Sebastian Pérez, one of Joaquin's helper, later married with Dolores
- María José Illanes as Dolores Silva, Magdalena's older sister
- Mauricio Pesutic as Dionisio Silva, Magdalena and Dolores's devilish and abusive father, later committed suicide
- Marcela Medel as Milagros Lucero, Dolores's mother, Dante's grandmother and Dionisio's estranged wife
- Bastián Bondenhofer as Raul Sanfuentes, The mayor of Valle Azul and Dolores's first husband, later died of unknown causes
- Maricarmen Arrigorriaga as Sonia Arce, Eduardo's estranged wife and Laura's mother
- Óscar Hernández as Eduardo Mardones, Laura's father and Raul's partner, later fell into his death
- Adela Secall as Laura Mardones, Alonso's ex-wife, later ambushed by Dolores
- Sebastián Layseca as Tomas Alamparte, one of Joaquin's helper, later died from drug overdose
- Juanita Ringeling as Ofelia Sanfuentes, Raul's daughter, fainted and dies
- Nicolás Oyarzún as Dante Silva, Dolores's son and Dionisio's grandson / son, killed by Laura
