= Óscar Olavarría =

Chilean actor, singer and comedian

Óscar Olavarría Araya (20 August 1951 – 27 January 2000) was a Chilean actor, singer and comedian from Santiago. He was a member of the television comedy Jappening con Ja. He died in a car accident on Chile Route 68 while en route to a show at Viña del Mar.

== Life and career ==
Olavarría's career began in music. He was a soloist in the group Los Trapos y Cristal.

He began acting in 1973, when he graduated from the University of Chile. At that time, he entered his first marriage, lasting two years.

He worked on a diverse range of television series, including Villa's Aromas (1981), Jealous (1982), A Happy Family (1982), and The Villa (1986).

He primarily acted in comedies, such as in "The Valverde" section of Giant Saturdays, where he won an Oscar for his performance as the 'eternal lover' of Monona Valverde (Marilú Cuevas). He served as a rival for this character's boyfriend, Pato Torres (Patricio Torres). He continued acting in 1988, becoming part of the "Singles Department" alongside other notable actors Cristián García-Huidobro and Rebeca Ghigliotto.

By the time he starred in Jappening con Ja, he was subject to the nickname the "Black" by his friends in the industry. He arrived in the 1984 season alongside his friends Cuevas and Torres. He performed as characters like "Cacho Escalona", the prince in the sketch The Office, and "The Crazy Motorcycle" in the section "The Married House Wants." Besides for "Don Lalo," he played the character of the president Eduardo Frei Ruiz-Tagle, receiving praise for his performance from a representative of Ruiz-Tagle. He also performed songs like "The Usher" and "Kleptomaniac."

== Death ==
Following his divorce during his second marriage in 1990, his gradual distancing from Jappening and subsequent reinstatement, he developed an alcoholism problem.

On the same day as his death, he was appearing as a guest towards the evening on the program Almost Seriously by Leo Caprile in La Red. Following the broadcast, on January 27, 2000, he died in an automobile accident on Chile's Route 68. After trying to make a U-turn to go back to Santiago, he failed to notice a truck headed his way. This resulted in a head-on collision and his immediate death. His friend and colleague Jorge Garrido appeared on the scene of the accident, and was badly affected. Olavarría was 48 at the time of his death.

His body arrived at Chile's Servicio Médico Legal, where he was surrounded by family and his colleagues from Jappening, Cuevas and Gladys del Río.

His final resting place is patio 99 of Santiago General Cemetery.

== Filmography ==
- Estació D'enllaç (1995)
- Questio of Colors (1995)
- The Villa (1986)
- Jappening with Ja (1978–1999)
- Fanny Joe-T (1984)
- The Siren of the Sea Blancarosa Blava (1984)
- A Happy Family (1982)
- Jealousy (1982)
- The Fifth of the Joint (1981)
- Dragon, St. George and the Knights Kaska (1981)
- Villa's Aromas (1981)
