= Marcela Medel =

Chilean actress

- Born: Sonia Marcela Medel Fuentes; December 13, 1957 (age 68); Santiago, Chile
- Education: University of Chile
- Occupation: Actress
- Spouse: Samuel Villarroel
- Children: 1

Sonia Marcela Medel Fuentes (Santiago, September 13, 1947) is a Chilean actress, popularly known for her roles in telenovelas.

== Biography ==
She completed her studies at the Manuel de Salas High School in Ñuñoa. Later, she entered the Theater School of the University of Chile, where she was a classmate of Claudia Di Girólamo, Alfredo Castro, Roxana Campos, Maricarmen Arrigorriaga, Alejandro Goic, and Rosa Ramírez. She was part of the Teatro Itinerante group.

Her television debut was in the TVN telenovela Villa Los Aromos, where she shared the screen with Luz Jiménez and Óscar Olavarría. She spent much of her television career at Canal 13, from the 1980s until the mid-2000s. In the 80s and 90s, the actress was part of memorable fictions such as “Andrea, justicia de mujer”, “Ángel Malo”, “Semidiós”, “¿Te conté?”, “Villa Napoli”, “Marrón Glacé”, “El palo al gato”, “Champaña” and “Marrón Glacé, el regreso”, where she stood out for her great talent.

In telenovelas, she has collaborated with directors such as Óscar Rodríguez Gingins, Herval Rossano, and Herval Abreu.

In March 2025, Medel landed the role of Angustias in the audio series La casa de Bernarda Alba, based on Federico García Lorca's play of the same name, a co-production between ChileActores, GestionArte, and the GAM Center, adapted and directed by Claudia Di Girolamo Quesney.

== Personal life ==
She is married to Chilean actor Samuel Villarroel, whom she met during the filming of the TVN telenovela La gran mentira (1982). Their daughter, Camila, was born during the marriage. Marcela is the sister of Eduardo Medel, who is the father of her six nephews and nieces.

== Filmography ==
=== Films ===
- Nemesio (1985)
- No (2012)
- Calzones rotos (2018)

=== Television ===
==== Telenovelas ====
Year	Title	Role	Channel
1981	Villa Los Aromos	Laura Muñoz	Televisión Nacional
1982	La gran mentira	Andrea	Televisión Nacional
1983	El juego de la vida	Marcela Salinas	Televisión Nacional
1983	La represa	Cristina Poblete	Televisión Nacional
1984	Andrea	Sonia	Canal 13
1986	Ángel malo	Antonieta Oyarzo	Canal 13
1988	Semidiós	Norma Acevedo	Canal 13
1990	¿Te conté?	Rita Carreño	Canal 13
1991	Villa Nápoli	Elcira Faúndez	Canal 13
1992	El palo al gato	Sofía	Canal 13
1993	Marrón glacé	Shirley Fariña	Canal 13
1994	Champaña	Fernanda Romero	Canal 13
1996	Marrón glacé, el regreso	Shirley Fariña	Canal 13
1997	Rossabella	Paola Vargas	Mega
1998	A todo dar	Solange Vásquez	Mega
1999	Algo está cambiando	Leonor Machuca	Mega
2000	Corazón pirata	Ginette Cáceres	Canal 13
2003	Machos	Clemencia Ríos	Canal 13
2004	Tentación	Milagros Yáñez	Canal 13
2005	Gatas y tuercas	Rita Ruiz	Canal 13
2006	Charly tango	Valeska Patiño	Canal 13
2011	Su nombre es Joaquín	Milagros Lucero	Televisión Nacional
2014	Volver a amar	Rosa Peña	Televisión Nacional
2016	Preciosas	María Ester Suárez	Canal 13
2017	Verdades ocultas	Laura Flores	Mega
2018	Verdades ocultas 2	Laura Flores	Mega

==== TV Series ====
Series
Year	Serie	Role	Channel
2002	La vida es una lotería	Mary	TVN
2009	Corin Tellado	Marisa	Chilevisión
