= Joaquín de Orbegoso =

Peruvian actor of Spanish descent (born 1979)

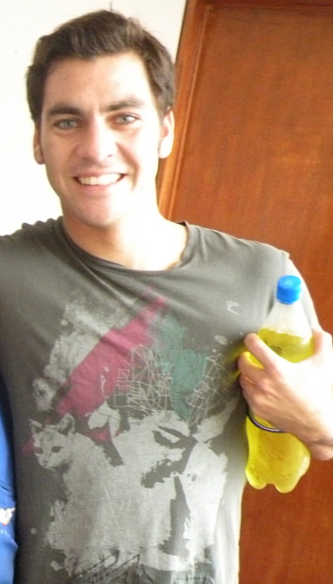
- Born: Joaquín de Orbegoso Seoane; June 24, 1979 (age 47); Lima, Peru
- Occupations: Actor, surfer
- Years active: 2006–present

Joaquín de Orbegoso Seoane (born 24 June 1979, in Lima, Peru) is a Peruvian actor most known for his role in the TV series Al Fondo Hay Sitio.

He starred in the soap operas Ana Cristina (2011) and Corazón de fuego (2011–12). He starred in the musical West Side Story (2011) as Riff Lorton.

He is the son of Guillermo de Orbegoso Orbegoso and Regina Seoane Morla, and half brother of the actress Katia Condos. He studied psychology at the Pontificia Universidad Católica del Perú.

== Filmography ==
Films
Year	Title	Role	Notes
2007	You don't want to know		
2008	Desencuentro	Martín/Eduardo	Short film
2008	Ojos de Fuego	Patrick	
2009	Don't panic	Gaspar	Short film
2008	Plexus	O'Mara	Short film
2008	Rocanrol 68		

Television
Year	Title	Role	Notes
1997	Torbellino		
1998	Bouleverd Torbellino		
2002	Qué buena raza		
2004–08	Así es la vida	Rafael Mendoza Berckemeyer	
2005	Vírgenes de la cumbia	"Coyote"	
2006	Esta Sociedad	Gym teacher	Guest actor
2007	Por la Sarita		
2008	Dina Páucar, el sueño continúa	Diego	
2008	Magnolia Merino	Marcelo	
2009	Rita y yo y mi otra yo	Salvador	
2009–10	Mamá por siempre	Host	
2010	Matadoras	Eloy	
2010	Al Fondo Hay Sitio	Michael "Mike" Miller	
2011	Ana Cristina	Luis "Lucho"	
2011–12	Corazón de fuego	Mateo "Teo" Salazar Montenegro	
2012–13	Al Fondo Hay Sitio	Michael "Mike" Miller	
2014	7 perros		
2024–25	Pobre novio	Eduardo Salazar Ganoza	

== Theatre ==
- Sólo por miedo (2004)
- Actos indecentes: los tres juicios de Oscar Wilde (2005)
- Manzanas para recordar (2005)
- Círculo de Arena (2006)
- Adiós al camino amarillo (2007)
- Canta la cloaca (2007)
- Chau Misterix (2008)
- Don't Worry Blue Eyes (2008) as Kurt Cobain.
- Cuatro amigos en busca de la chompa perdida (2008)
- ¿Donde está el idiota? (2009)
- L'Eden Cinema (2009)
- Incierto Concierto (2009)
- El enfermo imaginario (2010)
- Escuela de Payasos (2010)
- West Side Story (2011) as Riff Lorton.
- Escuela de Payasos (2011)
- Sueños de un seductor (2013) as Bill.
- L'Eden Cinema (2013)
