= Verdades ocultas =

Chilean television soap opera

- Genre: Telenovela
- Created by: Carlos Oporto
- Written by: Carlos Oporto; Sebastián Arrau; Fernando Delgado; Marianela Fuenzalida; Felipe Montero
- Directed by: Felipe Arratia; Manuel Buch; Pablo Aedo; Víctor Huerta; Claudio López de Lérida
- Starring: Camila Hirane; Solange Lackington; Carmen Zabala; Catalina Guerra; Matías Oviedo; Cristian Campos; Javiera Díaz de Valdés
- Country of origin: Chile
- Original language: Spanish
- No. of seasons: 6
- No. of episodes: 1128

Production
- Executive producer: Patricio López
- Producers: Cecilia Aguirre; Jorge Singh; Vania Portilla
- Editor: Javier Kappes
- Running time: 35 minutes (approx.)
- Production companies: Red Televisiva Megavisión; AGTV Producciones (2017-2019); Chilefilms (2019-present)

Original release
- Network: Mega
- Release: July 24, 2017 – June 22, 2022

Verdades ocultas (English title: Hidden Truths) is a Chilean telenovela produced by AGTV Producciones and Chilefilms, starring Marcela Medel, Camila Hirane, Carmen Luz Zabala, Javiera Díaz de Valdés, Viviana Rodríguez, Matías Oviedo, Carlos Díaz León and Mauricio Pesutic. It aired on Mega from July 24, 2017 to June 22, 2022.

It is the longest-running telenovela on Chilean television.

== Series overview ==
Season	Episodes	Originally released	
Season	Episodes	First released	Last released
1	168	July 24, 2017	March 21, 2018
2	114	March 22, 2018	August 29, 2018
3	165	August 30, 2018	April 25, 2019
4	168	April 26, 2019	December 30, 2019
5	189	December 31, 2019	March 1, 2021
6	156	March 2, 2021	October 6, 2021
7	168	October 7, 2021	June 22, 2022

== Cast ==
=== Main ===
- Camila Hirane as Rocío Verdugo Flores / Martina Benavente Merino
- Solange Lackington as Rocío Verdugo Flores (alias: Ana Merino)
- Carmen Zabala as Agustina Mackenna Guzmán / Olivia Tapia Mackenna
- Catalina Guerra as Agustina Mackenna Guzmán
- Matías Oviedo as Tomás Valencia Fernández / Cristobel Valencia Mackenna
- Cristián Campos as Tomás Valencia Fernández
- Gabriel Urzúa as Benjamín Valencia Verdugo
- Cecilia Cucurella as María Luisa Guzmán
- Mabel Farías as Eliana Zapata
- Remigio Remedy as Ricardo San Martín Marín
- Cristián Arriagada as Diego Castillo Hurtado / Gaspar Inostroza
- Felipe Castro as Diego Castillo Hurtado
- Javiera Díaz de Valdés as Samantha Müller Pérez / Julieta Müller Pérez
- Alejandra Fosalba as Samantha Müller Pérez
- Maricarmen Arrigorriaga as Leticia Hurtado
- Constanza Araya as Natalia
- Rocío Toscano as Roxana Núñez
- Marcela Medel as Laura Flores
- Osvaldo Silva as Rodolfo Mackenna
- Alejandro Trejo as Genaro Silva
- Mauricio Pesutic as Mario Verdugo
- Renato Munster as José Soto
- Nicolás Saavedra as Rafael Silva
- Santiago Tupper as Alonso Toledo
- Carmen Gloria Bresky as Gladys Núñez / Raquel Núñez
- Claudia Hidalgo as Viviana Leiva
- María de los Ángeles García as Maite Soto
- Ricardo Vergara as Franco Soto
- Macarena Teke as Nadia Retamales
- Norma Norma Ortiz as Maruja Pérez
- Teresita Reyes as Gabriela Marín
- Nicolás Brown as Eduardo Fuentes
- Antonia Giesen as Paula Fuentes
- Luna Martinez as Claudia Cárdenas
- Dominique Jimenez as Sofía Walker Cárdenas
- María Jesús Miranda as Javiera Diez Barraza
- Cristián Carvajal as Samuel Diez
- María José Necochea as María Angélica Barraza
- Renato Jofré as Gonzalo Verdugo Flores
- Mauricio Flores as Juan Francisco Rodríguez
- Beltrán Izquierdo as Cristobel Tapia (born Tomas "Tomasito" Valencia Mackenna)
- Stefan Platz as Benjamin Valencia Verdugo
- Juan Falcón as Francesco Leone
- Antonia Bosman as Julieta Müller Pérez
- Katty Kowaleczko as Gracia Pérez
- Alexander Solórzano as José Luis Rodríguez
- Viviana Rodríguez as María Luisa Guzmán
- Francisca Gavilán as Eliana Zapata
- Julio Jung Duvauchelle as Ricardo San Martín Marín
- Emilio Edwards as Nicolás Walker
- Carlos Díaz León as Leonardo San Martín Marín (aliases: Lucas Montalbán/Matias del Santo/Javier Briceño/Andrés Benavente)

=== Recurring ===
- Julio Milostich as Pedro Mackenna
- Paula Sharim as Isabel Guzmán
- Begoña Basauri as Muriel Droguett
- Paulina Eguiluz as Gloria Zúñiga
- Khaled Darwich as Sebastián Mackenna Guzmán
- María Angélica Luzzi as Teresa
- Lorena Prada as Olga Valdés
- Ester Müller as Belma
- Benjamín Hidalgo as Marcial
- Carlos Martínez as Dr. Gustavo Lama
- Bárbara Ríos as Sonia
- Catalina Vera as Marisol Sánchez
- Clara Larraín as Valentina Urrutia
- Claudia Tapia Mendoza as Laura Flores (in flashbacks)
- Cristian Soto Marabolí as Pedro Mackenna (in flashbacks)
- Alondra Valenzuela as Agustina Mackenna Guzmán (in flashbacks)
- Sofía García as María Luisa Guzmán (in flashbacks)
- Catalina Silva as Isidora Undurraga
- Carlos Briones as Jairo
- Catalina de la Cerda as Florencia
- Jorge Denegri as Isidora's father
- Hernán Contreras as Emilio Velásquez
- Felipe Jaroba as Gendarme Miguel
- Romeo Singer as Rafael's doctor
- Bárbara Mundt as Jueza
- Cristián Alegría as Pedro Mackenna's lawyer
- Julio César Serrano as Agustina Building Concierge
- Joaquín Emilio as spiritual master
- Julia Ibarz as Alba
- Ale Paredes-Rosales as Inés
- Seide Tosta as Renata

== Awards and nominations ==
Year	Awards	Category	Nominated work	Result
2018	Copihue de Oro			
2018	Copihue de Oro	Best telenovela		Nominated
