= Apio verde =

- Directed by: Francesc Morales
- Written by: Francesc Morales
- Produced by: Francesc Morales; Camilo Klein; Catherine Mazoyer; Jorge Gaete
- Starring: Catherine Mazoyer; Cristian Gajardo; Catalina Aguayo; Sonia Mena; Teresita Reyes; Alejandro Trejo; Gregory Cohen; Jenny Cavallo; Carolina Paulsen
- Cinematography: Alex Leyton
- Edited by: Francesc Morales
- Production companies: Klein Producciones; Efecto Moral Films
- Release date: July 2013
- Running time: 82 minutes
- Country: Chile
- Language: Spanish

Apio verde is 2013 Chilean thriller film written and directed by Francesc Morales, starring Catherine Mazoyer, Cristian Gajardo, Catalina Aguayo, Sonia Mena, Teresita Reyes, Alejandro Trejo, Gregory Cohen, Jenny Cavallo, Carolina Paulsen, among others. The film focuses on how a normal woman is turned into a psychotic as she's told the child she's expecting has anencephaly, a disease that won't allow him to live once he's born. As she lives in Chile, one of the few countries where therapeutic abortion is illegal in any situation, she must wait until the natural birth. The film was released in Chile in July 2013.

Morales said recently to Screen International: “This is a very real situation that has happened many times in our country. Since 1989, a few months before the end of the Chilean dictatorship, it was stated that therapeutic abortion would be considered illegal, not even when the life of the mother is in danger. The realism is very important in this film, which is why the story is based on the lives of many real people and it also shows how politics and religion get involved in a subject like this. Yet the movie is not a drama, but a thriller that states how this is not only an attempt on human rights but also a situation that always leads to a violent resolution.”

== Plot ==
A couple is told their child has a disease that won't allow him to live outside the mother's womb. It won't matter how much physical or mental pain they feel; as therapeutic abortion is illegal on Chile, they'll have to wait until the natural birth.

== See also ==
- Cinema of Chile
