= Nina de azúcar =

- Genre: Telenovela
- Created by: Marcela Citterio
- Written by: Marcela Citterio; Carolina Parmo; Chiara Francia Citterio
- Directed by: Ani Alva Helfer; Sandro Méndez; Aldo Salvini
- Creative director: Francisco Álvarez
- Starring: Patricia Barreto; Juan Ignacio Di Marco
- Theme music composer: Juan Carlos Fernández
- Opening theme: "Dulce" by Gali
- Country of origin: Peru
- Original language: Spanish
- No. of seasons: 1
- No. of episodes: 84

Production
- Executive producer: Ivanna de la Piedra
- Producers: Hugo Coya; Adriana Álvarez; Michelle Alexander
- Camera setup: Multi-camera
- Production company: Del Barrio Producciones

Original release
- Network: América Televisión
- Release: 2 December 2024 – 1 April 2025

Nina de azúcar is a Peruvian telenovela created by Marcela Citterio. It aired on América Televisión from 2 December 2024 to 1 April 2025. The series stars Patricia Barreto and Juan Ignacio Di Marco.

== Premise ==
Nina Garay works at her family's bakery, Nina de Azúcar, while Ramiro "the Jaguar" Morán is a footballer that plays as a forward. They meet when Nina is hired to cater a party where Ramiro is the special guest. Nina and Ramiro become involved in a misunderstanding when the press start a rumor that they are in a romantic relationship, creating entanglements and lies on their part until their true feelings are finally revealed.

== Cast ==
- Patricia Barreto as Georgina "Nina" Garay Corradi
  - Macarena Argote as child «Nina»
- Juan Ignacio Di Marco as Ramiro "El Jaguar" Morán del Trigo:
  - Di Marco also portrays Ramiro's twin brother Rodrigo Morán del Trigo / Pedro «el Lobo» Jiménez
- Vanessa Saba as Alessandra de la Torre
- Fiorella Díaz as Mirta Corradi de Garay
- Valentina Saba as Valentina Montes de la Torre
- Nicolás Galindo as Guillermo III "Guille" del Pueblo
- Iván Chávez as Angélico "Ángel" Garay
- Sebastián Monteghirfo as Ignacio de la Torre
- Raúl Zuazo as Leandro Montes: Antagonista reformado
- José Miguel Argüelles as Bruno Garay Corradi
- Sebastián Rubio as César Marsano
- Grapa Paola as Margarita del Trigo de Morán
- Nicolás Fantinato as Fabián Morán
- Daniela Camaiora as Dayana Delfín
- Melissa Paredes as Sheyla Quispe / Glow, "La Sirena Tropical"
- Nicolás Osorio as Luis "La Abeja" Espinoza
- Matilde León as Eva Moreno López
- Dominic Oré as Simón Rufino / Morán Garay "Simoncito"
- Haydeé Cáceres as Emma / Esmeralda

== Reception ==
The telenovela premiered on 2 December 2024 with a percentage rating of 20.8 points, beating its competitor, the telenovela Pobre novio, which premiered the same day on Latina Televisión.
