= Pobre novio (Peruvian TV series) =

#PobreNovio
- Genre: Telenovela
- Based on: Pobre novio by Alejandro Cabrera
- Written by: José Fonseca; Luis de Prado; Mariana Silva
- Directed by: Gerardo Herrera
- Starring: Nico Ponce; Priscila Espinoza; Joaquín de Orbegoso; Andrea Luna; Javier Valdés; Bruno Odar; Urpi Gibbons
- Opening theme: "Canción Bonita" by Carlos Vives & Ricky Martin
- Composer: Martin Chira
- Country of origin: Peru
- Original language: Spanish
- No. of seasons: 1
- No. of episodes: 181

Production
- Executive producers: Patricio López Vicuña; Carol Ríos Polastri
- Producer: Guillermo Lay Arcos
- Cinematography: Pedro Bergna
- Editor: Mario Ching
- Camera setup: Multi-camera
- Production companies: Chasqui Producciones; Mega

Original release
- Network: Latina Televisión
- Release: 2 December 2024 – 15 August 2025

#PobreNovio is a Peruvian telenovela based on the 2021 Chilean telenovela of the same name, created by Alejandro Cabrera. It aired on Latina Televisión from 2 December 2024 to 15 August 2025. The series stars Nico Ponce, Priscila Espinoza, Joaquín de Orbegoso, Andrea Luna, Javier Valdés, Bruno Odar and Urpi Gibbons.

== Plot ==
Santiago García is about to get married but is left standing at the altar by his fiancée, Pamela. Just moments before making her entrance, she decides to flee with a mysterious man who had arrived on a motorcycle, which turns out to be her boss and lover, Arturo Thompson, an elderly millionaire. Faced with this unexpected turn of events, Santiago's best friend, Johnny, decides to help him find a second chance at love by creating a profile for him on the dating app "Finder". Beyond this, what truly catapults him to the status of "Peru's Sweetheart" is the viral spread on social media of images from his failed wedding. Businessman Eduardo Salazar spots a prime business opportunity in Santiago's unfortunate predicament, so he reaches out to propose that he be raffled off as a potential husband to single women. At first, the idea strikes Santiago as preposterous; however, he eventually decides it could be a good way to get over Pamela and make her jealous in the process. The person who ultimately convinces him, almost without intending to, is Isabela Thompson, a marketing executive who had recently become engaged to Eduardo and happens to be the daughter of the wealthy Arturo. Although Isabela was on the verge of getting married and Santiago is forbidden from falling in love again until the raffle concludes, the two of them begin to develop an attraction that proves difficult to control.

== Cast ==
- Nico Ponce as Santiago García Flores
- Priscila Espinoza as María Isabela Thompson Benavides
- Joaquín de Orbegoso as Eduardo Salazar
- Andrea Luna as Pamela Chumbe Cruz
- Javier Valdés as Arturo Thompson
- Manuel Gold as Juan David "Johnny" Videla Martínez
- Laly Goyzueta as Beatriz "Betty" Cruz
- Urpi Gibbons as Vilma Flores Rossi
- Bruno Odar as César García
- Alejandro Tagle as Marcos García Flores
- Rodrigo López as Iván Chumbe Cruz / Iván García Cruz
- Érika "Keki" Rojas as Génesis Márquez López
- Flor Castillo as Rosa Martínez
- Camila Ferrer as Mónica Olavarría
- Daniela Granda as Sara Grados / Sara Meneses
- Adriana Salas as Alicia Aguilera
- Almudena García as Manuela Salazar

== Reception ==
The telenovela premiered on 2 December 2024 with a percentage of 6.1 points, being surpassed by its competitor, the telenovela Nina de azúcar airing on América Televisión.
