= Malas costumbres =

- Theatrical release poster
- Directed by: Pablo Mantilla
- Written by: Pablo Mantilla
- Produced by: Pablo Mantilla; Patricio Ochoa
- Starring: Rodrigo Pardow; Mariana Loyola; Rodrigo Lisboa; Mayte Rodríguez
- Cinematography: José Luis Canales
- Edited by: Carolina Aránguiz; Javier Estévez
- Music by: Cristián Freund; Cristobal Carvajal
- Production companies: Zapatilla Films; La Merced Producciones
- Distributed by: Andes Films
- Release date: March 14, 2024
- Running time: 90 minutes
- Country: Chile
- Language: Spanish

Malas costumbres (lit. 'Bad habits') is a 2024 Chilean comedy film written, co-produced and directed by Pablo Mantilla in his directorial debut. Starring Rodrigo Pardow, Mariana Loyola, Rodrigo Lisboa and Mayte Rodríguez. It premiered on March 14, 2024, in Chilean theaters.

== Synopsis ==
Amid the excitement of the 2016 Copa América Centenario, two brothers have the opportunity to collect the substantial inheritance left by their mother. However, they realize that their father, who abandoned them 20 years ago, also has a right to claim it, so they must take matters into their own hands.

== Cast ==
The actors participating in this film are:

- Rodrigo Pardow as Esteban Robles
- Mariana Loyola as Sara Yáñez
- Rodrigo Lisboa as Guillermo Robles
- Mayte Rodríguez as Sol Ramírez
- Joseff Messmer as Dylan Robles
- Jaime Azócar as Marcos Robles
- Sebastián Arrigorriaga as Miguel
- Jaime McManus as Pedro
