= Araceli Vitta =

Chilean actress

Personal details
- Born: Araceli Vitta Arambarri; 4 October 1973 (age 53) Santiago, Chile
- Education: Santo Tomás University (BA)
- Occupation: Actress
- Profession: Public relations

Araceli Vitta Arambarri (born 4 March 1973) is a Chilean actress and public relations agent.

== Biography ==
Vitta made his television debut as part of the Children's Clan of Sábado Gigante, program directed by Don Francisco for Canal 13. In 1987, she was part of the cast of the television series «La Invitación» from the same channel. Later, she appeared in fictions such as «Fácil de Amar», «Champaña», «Juegos de Fuego» and «A todo dar». In 1998 she decided to move away from the television to focus on her family life.

In 1996, she was part of the international jury of the 37th edition of the Vina del Mar Song Festival.

She was married for 12 years with Daniel Guerrero, Chilean composer and former member of the musical duo «La Sociedad». With him she had a son. They both composed a song called «El juego del amor» (The Game of Love), which was interpreted by Daniela Aleuy and represented to Chile in the international competition of the 2001 Viña del Mar Festival.

Away from television, in 2003, Vitta finished her BA in Public Relations at the Santo Tomás University. She has practiced her profession in different companies and entities such as the Municipality of Pirque. Similarly, she has been part of some plays and has had sporadic appearances in the Chilean version of the series Lo que callamos las mujeres, broadcast by Chilevisión.

== Filmography ==
=== Novels ===
Year	Novel	Character	Channel
1987	La invitación	Betty del Solar	Canal 13
1988	Semidiós	Ana Luz Santana	Canal 13
1992	Fácil de amar	Nadia Bascur	Canal 13
1994	Champaña	Victoria Echaurren	Canal 13
1995	Juegos de fuego	Alejandra Spencer Vergara	TVN
1996	Para toda la vida	Marisa	Televisa/Mega
1997	Rossabella	Cristina	Mega
1998	A todo dar	Catalina Balboa	Mega
2004	Xfea2	Sonia Bustamante	Mega
2010	Feroz	Adriana Cooper	Canal 13

=== Television series ===
Year	Serie	Character	Channel
1994	Fácil de amar: La comedia	Nadia Bascur	Canal 13
2001	La otra cara del espejo		Mega
2007−2008	Karkú	Miss Faviana Castillo	TVN
2015	Código Rosa	Various characters	Mega
2016	Lo que callamos las mujeres	Various characters	Chilevisión

=== Other participations ===
Year	Title	Character	Channel
1984−1985	Sábado Gigante	Children's Clan Member	Canal 13
1989	Sábado Gigante	Actress of Las siete hermanas	Canal 13
1996	Vina del Mar Song Festival	Internacional jury	Mega
2005	Hola Andrea	Drama actress	Mega
2008	Teatro en Chilevisión	Mi Pasado me Condena (Featured)	Chilevisión
