= Sandra O'Ryan =

Chilean actress

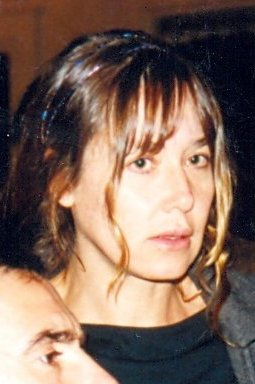
- Born: Sandra O'Ryan; December 25, 1960 (age 64); Santiago, Chile
- Occupation: Actress

Sandra O'Ryan (born December 25, 1960) is a Chilean television, theatre and film actress. She was born in Santiago, Chile. She is the mother of the actress María José Urzúa. Her first television appearance was in 1988 in Vivir Así, but she got fame working in the telenovela Amor a Domicilio and in the film La Rubia de Kennedy. She actually joined MEGA in the comedy/drama show called Otra Vez Papá along with her daughter María José.

== Filmography ==
=== Telenovelas and TV series ===
- Vivir así (1988) as Gina
- La intrusa (1989) as Diana
- Acércate más (1990) as Beatriz
- Ellas por ellas (1991) as Claudia
- Fácil de amar (1992) as Marcela
- Doble juego (1993) as Soraya Alafán
- Top secret (1994) as Kelly Román
- Amor a domicilio (1995) as Mireya Zambrano
- Amor a domicilio, la comedia (1996) as Mireya Zambrano
- Adrenalina as Rosario Andrade
- Playa salvaje (1997) as Carla Cumings
- Marparaíso (1998) as Manuela Larraín
- Cerro Alegre (1999) as Alexandra Thompson
- Corazón pirata (2001) as Claudia Gallardo
- 17 (2005) as Verónica Salazar
- La Nany (2005) as Profesora Verdugo (1 ep.)
- Los simuladores (2005) as Productora (1 ep.)
- Porky te amo (2006) as Angélica Santa María
- Bakán (2006) as Ana María Correa (12 ep)
- Amor por accidente (2007) as Doctora
- Vivir con 10 (2007) as Nina Fontana
- Otra vez papá (2009) as Mariana

=== Theatre ===
- Teatro en CHV
  - Despedida de soltero (2007) as ?
  - Lo comido y lo bailado nadie lo quita (2009) as ?
  - Amor a dos bandas (2009) as Mariana
  - Nano puertas adentro (2009) as Ignacia

=== Films ===
- La rubia de Kennedy (1995) as Margot
