= Renato Munster =

Chilean actor

Renato Münster
- Born: Renato Enrique Münster Gripe; 28 December 1962 (age 63); Santiago, Chile
- Occupation: Actor,
- Years active: 1987–present

Renato Enrique Münster Gripe (Santiago, 28 December 1962) is a Chilean film, theater and television actor.

He graduated from the Liceo de Aplicación to later study at the Theater School of the Faculty of Arts of the University of Chile, with studies at the National Conservatory of Music as a flute interpreter. He has worked in theater and television in Chile and abroad and also as an artistic producer in theater, music and dance. He is the creator of the theater and audiovisual content generation platform Teatro Play www.teatroplay.cl, in which he develops creative solutions for the HR, Marketing and Internal Communication departments of all types of companies and institutions. He has starred in telenovelas such as Rompecorazón, A todo dar and Maldita and has a long time career in television.

== Filmography ==
=== Telenovelas ===
Year	Telenovela	Character
1987	La invitación	Jacinto
1990	El milagro de vivir	Miguel Ángel Sandoval
1991	Volver a empezar	Hugo
1993	Ámame	Marcos Miretti
1994	Rompecorazón	Juan Antonio Miranda
1995	Juegos de fuego	Ignacio Ugarte
1996	Loca piel	Emilio Duval
1997	Rossabella	Agustín
1998	A todo dar	José Miguel
1998	Travesuras del corazón	Gonzalo Aguirre
1999	Algo está cambiando	Tomás Zúñiga
2002	Buen partido	Rafa
2003	Machos	Pedro Pablo Estévez
2010	Primera dama	'Diablo' José Astudillo
2012	Maldita	Jean Claude Piquet
2017	Verdades ocultas	José Soto
2019	Amor a la Catalán	Walter Ruiz
