= Ana González Olea =

Chilean actress (1915–2008)

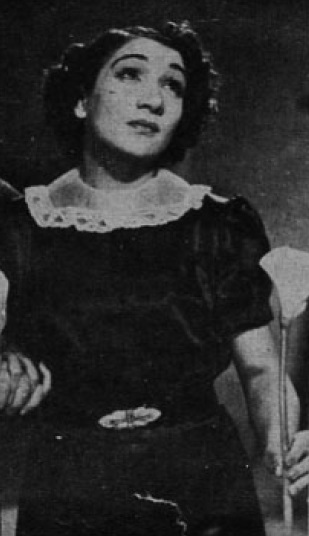

Ana González Olea (May 4, 1915 – February 21, 2008) was an actress in Chilean theater, television and radio. She was commonly known by her nickname La Desideria.

González was born in Santiago on May 4, 1915. She received the National Prize of Art of Chile in 1969 for her work.

González died on February 21, 2008, at 8:05pm in her apartment on Miraflores Street in Santiago, Chile. She was 92 years old. The cause of Gonzalez's death was septic shock and the failure of both her liver and kidneys. She was also ill with advanced Alzheimer's disease since 1995, which left her in poor health for the last two years of her life. Her funeral took place at the Church of La Merced in Santiago.
