= Mayte Rodríguez =

Chilean actress

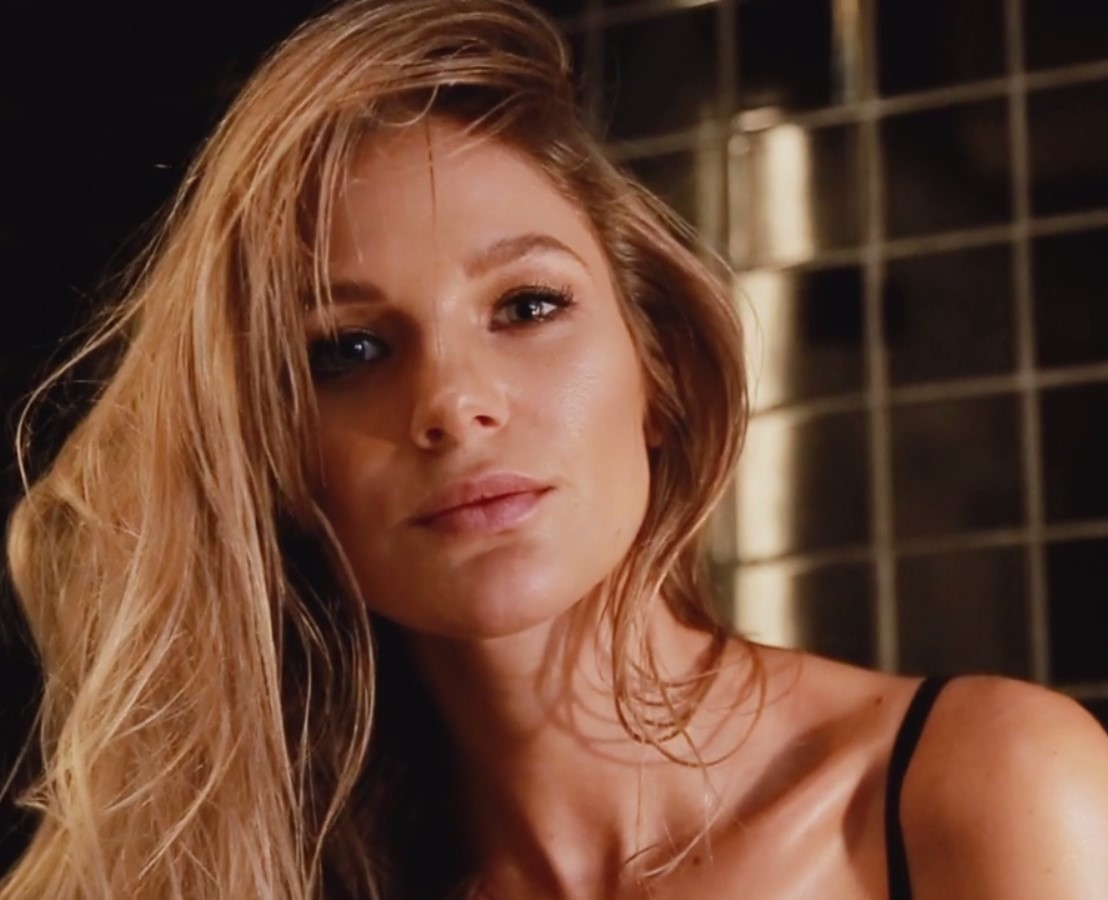
- Born: Mayte Andrea Rodríguez Arregui; 25 January 1989 (age 37); Santiago, Chile
- Occupations: Actress; model
- Partners: Tiago Correa (2011-2016); Alexis Sánchez (2017-2018); Diego Boneta (2019-2020)
- Children: 1
- Parent(s): Óscar Rodríguez Gingins; Carolina Arregui

Mayte Andrea Rodríguez Arregui (born 25 January 1989) is a Chilean actress and model who was also the partner of soccer player Alexis Sánchez.

== Career ==
Her television debut was at the age of 12, as part of the teen cast of the musical program Música libre on Canal 13. Later, she got a small break in acting with a brief role in the series BKN in 2004.

== Personal life ==
Her father is Óscar Rodríguez, a soap opera director, and her mother is Carolina Arregui, a soap opera actress.

Between 2011 and 2016 she was in a relationship with Chilean actor Tiago Correa. After her relationship with Tiago, she maintained a relationship with Chilean soccer player Alexis Sánchez which ended in 2018.

From February 2019 to mid-2020 she was in a relationship with Mexican actor Diego Boneta.

On 10 January 2022, her first son, Galo, was born product of a relationship with gastronomic entrepreneur Camilo Figueroa.

== Filmography ==
=== Telenovelas ===
- Feroz (Canal 13, 2010)
- Infiltradas (Chilevisión, 2011)
- La sexóloga (Chilevisión, 2012)
- Socias (TVN, 2013)
- Caleta del sol (TVN, 2014)
- Un diablo con ángel (TVN, 2017)
- Dime quién fue (TVN, 2017)

=== Series ===
- BKN (Mega, 2004)

=== Films ===
- Distancia (2015)
- Reverso (2015, short film)
- American Huaso (2018)
- La novia de Azapa (2018)
- La forma del miedo (2021)
- Malas costumbres (2024) as Sol Ramírez

=== Documentaries ===
- Chile salvaje y extremo (2017) - Host

=== Ads ===
- Falabella (2011)
- Fitness (2014)
- Peugeot (2016-2018)
- París (2018-present)
- Pamela Grant (2018)
