= Paola Troncoso =

Chilean actress and comedian

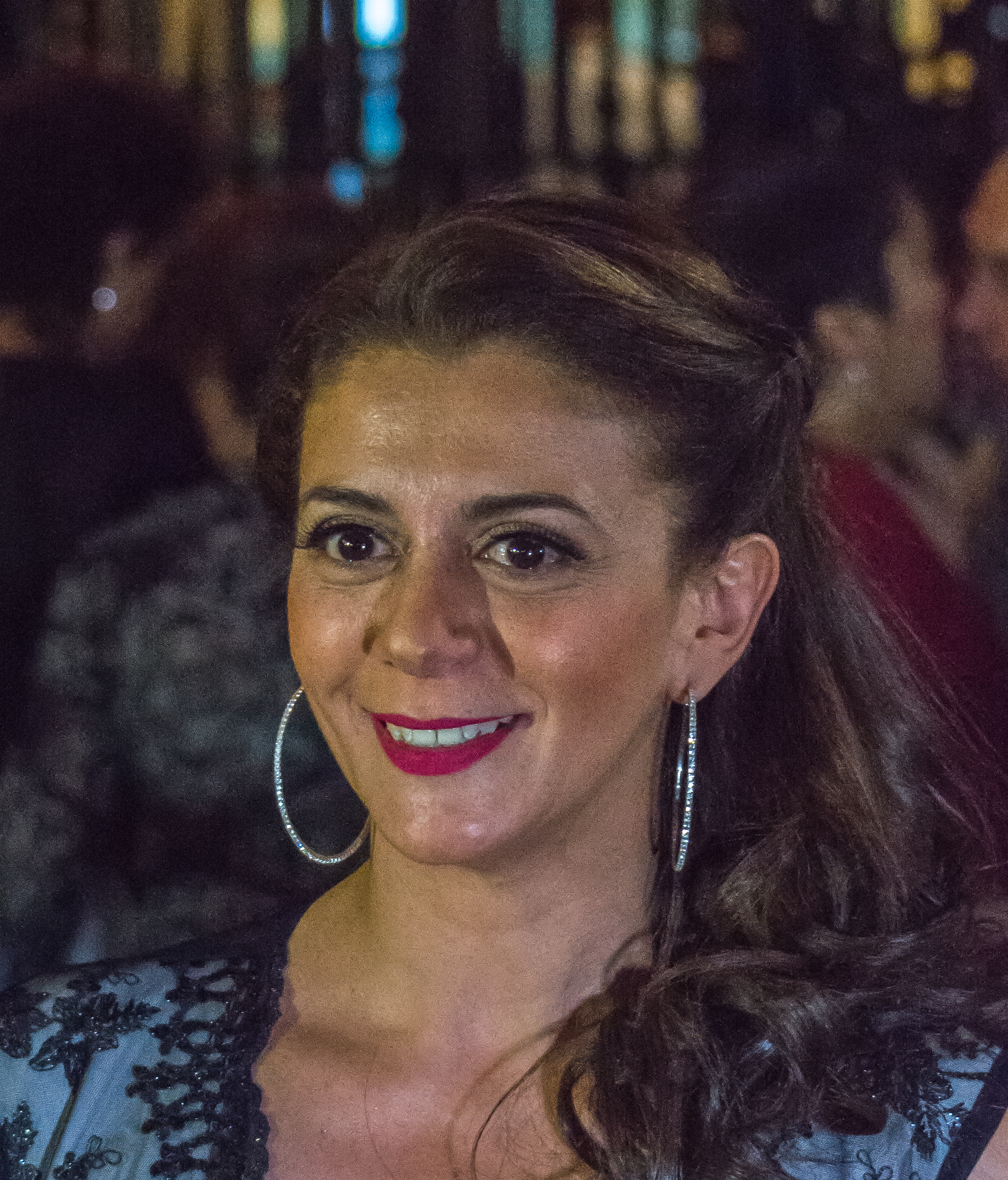
- Born: 12 January 1974; Santiago, Chile
- Years active: 1995-present
- Notable work: Morandé con Compañia; Paola & Miguelito: La serie
- Children: 2

Paola Troncoso (born 12 January 1974) is a Chilean actress and comedian.

She became known for her participation in the comedy show Morandé con compañía where she played several characters, being "Polillita" and "Miguelito's" mother, "Paolita Rojas"; the most outstanding.

== Career ==
She began her career as an actress and comedian in 1995, when, through a casting, she was chosen to participate in the comedy section of Mega's program Acompáñeme. Two years later, she joined the programs Venga conmigo and Na' que ver con Chile of the same channel, consolidating herself in the comedy scene. Subsequently, she was part of the theater team at Canal 13.

In 2004 she arrived at Mega and joined the last season of the program Jappening con ja. In 2005 she was hired in Morandé con Compañía (MCC), to play different characters such as "La Polillita", "Malena", "María Pinto" and her most outstanding character, "Paola 'Paolita' Rojas", the mother of "Miguelito", played by Hans "Miguelito" Malpartida; remaining until the last broadcast of the program.

In 2014 she was crowned as "Reina Guachaca", by popular vote.

With the end of MCC in April 2021, she joined the cast of the program Mi barrio, tu mejor compañía, where she played several characters, besides reprising her role as "Miguelito's" mother.

In November 2021 she appeared in the third season of The Chef's Disciple as a participant and member of the red team, being eliminated in the 11th Gala.

Since January 2022, along with Hans "Miguelito" Malpartida, they star in the comedy series Paola y Miguelito, a comedy that portrays the experiences of the emblematic characters of MCC and Mi barrio.

== Filmography ==
=== Television programs ===
Year	Program	Role	Channel
1995	Acompáñeme	Actress/Comedian	Mega
1997	Venga conmigo	Actress/Comedian	Canal 13
1997	Na' que ver con Chile	Actress/Comedian	Canal 13
1998	Teatro en Canal 13	Actress/Comedian	Mega
2004	Jappening con ja	Actress/Comedian	Mega
2005-2021	Morandé con compañia	Actress/Comedian	Mega
2007	Rojo	Actress/Comedian	TVN
2021	Mi barrio, tu mejor compañia	Actress/Comedian	Mega
2021	El discípulo del chef	Participant	Chilevisión
2022-present	Paola & Miguelito	Paola Rojas	Mega

=== Awards and nominations ===
Year	Award	Category	Result	Ref.
2018	Caleuche Awards	Best Comedian	Nominated	
2019	Caleuche Awards	Best Comedian	Nominated	
2023	Caleuche Awards	Best Comedian	Nominated	
