= Trinidad Piriz =

Chilean playwright and actress

Trinidad Piriz is a Chilean playwright and actress.

In the 2000s, Piriz collaborated with actress Paula Aros. After the collaboration stopped in 2011, Piriz went to Berlin where she became a victim of scam. She returned to Chile and wrote her first play, Helen Brown, in 2012 based on her experience in Berlin.

Piriz graduated from Goldsmiths, University of London in Master en performance making. Since 2010, she has been teaching at the theater School at Universidad Católica de Chile, University of Chile, and Universidad Mayor.

In 2013, together with Daniel Marabolí and Alejandro Moreno, she produced Teatro Nacional, a play written by Alejandro Moreno.

Since 2020 Piriz has been running a podcast El estallido de las cosas together with María Court. In 2022, she became the director of Podium Podcast, owned by Prisa Media. The first podcast she ran as a director was Expertas en Nada with Paloma Salas and Elisa Zulueta.

== Plays ==
- Helen Brown (2012, with Daniel Marabolí)
- Ithaca (2015, with Daniel Marabolí)
- Fin (2017, with Daniel Marabolí)
