= Katty Kowaleczko =

Chilean actress

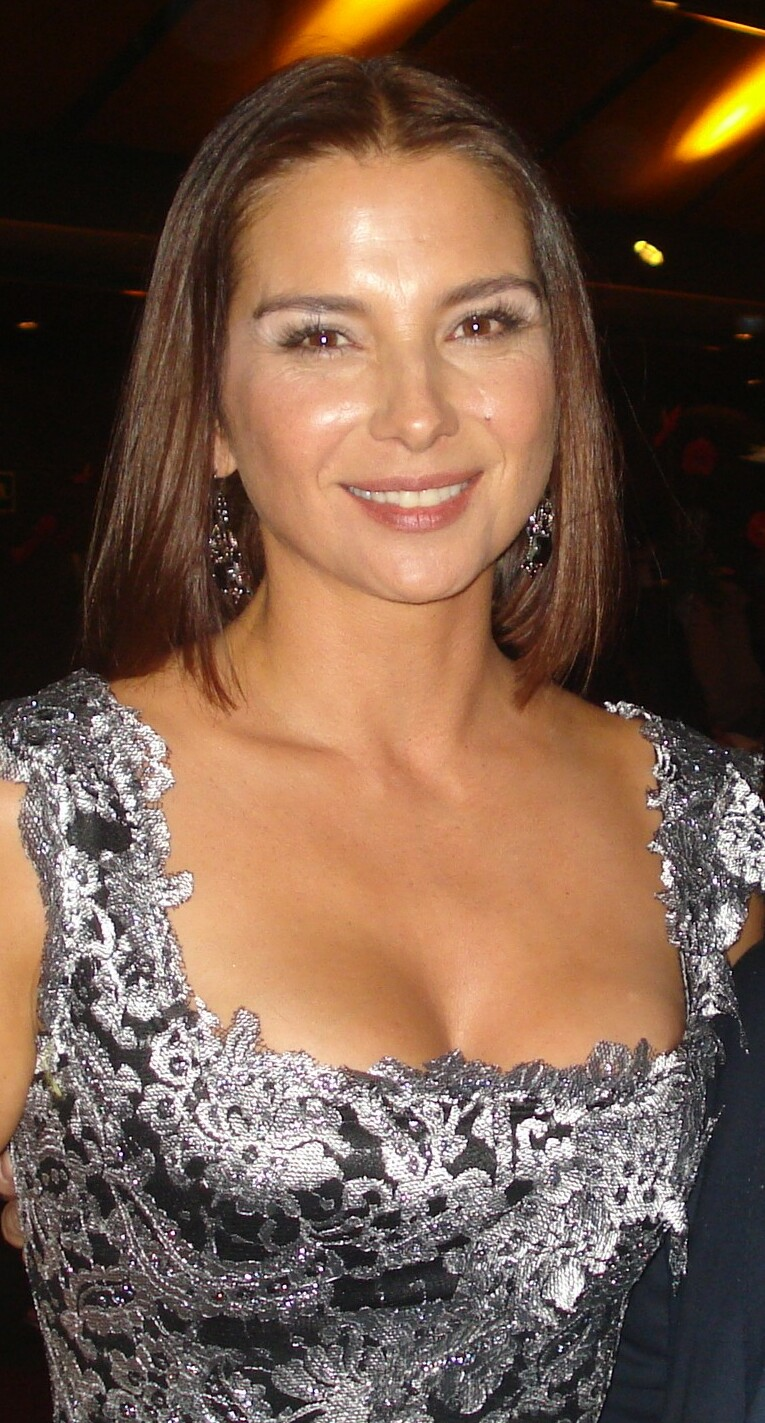
- Kowaleczko in 2009
- Born: 2 October 1964 (age 61); Santiago, Chile

Katarzyna Helena Kowałeczko Henríquez (Santiago, 2 October 1964), better known as Katty Kowaleczko or Katty Ko, is a Chilean actress of Polish ancestry.

== Early life ==
Ko started her career at a young age by participating in beauty pageants.

== Career ==
Kowaleczko debuted in a telenovela and then in 1987 got a role in the television series The Invitation. She participated in productions on Canal 13 such as Las Vegas. Kowaleczko then had a brief stint on TVN, which became known for encouraging the children's program Arboliris. She returned to Canal 13 to star in the TV series Marron Glacé.

She participated in theatrical productions such as The Vagina Monologues and in film. In 2004, she portrayed the role of a lover in the TV series Temptation. She shaved her head for the role. In Telethon 2006, she did a striptease. She then worked on the docu-reality Born To Win. She participated in the great Chilean series of all time The 80.

In June 2010, Kowaleczko announced that she left Canal angel to migrate to Chilevisión and star in a dual role on the 2011 TV series Infiltradas.

Following roles as Stella Valderrama in 2021's Pobre Novio telenovela and as Gracia Pérez in the Verdades Ocultas telenovela, in 2024, Kowaleczko starred the Los Casablanca telenovela, as Samuel (Francisco Reyes Cristi)'s mother-in-law.
