= Jorge Pedreros =

Chilean musician, record producer, actor and comedian

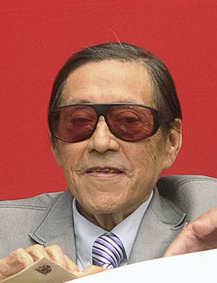
- Pedreros in May 2011
- Born: Jorge Arnaldo Pedreros Avilés; 8 August 1942; Santiago, Chile
- Died: 14 September 2013 (aged 71)
- Occupations: comedian, actor, composer, record producer

Jorge Arnaldo Pedreros Avilés (8 August 1942 – 14 September 2013) was a Chilean musician, record producer, actor, and comedian. He was one of the creators of the iconic comedy show Jappening con Ja alongside Eduardo Ravani and Fernando Alarcón.

== Personal life ==
Pedreros was born on 8 August 1942 in Santiago, Chile. He was married to Gladys del Río from 1967 until his death in 2013. Pedreros died on 14 September 2013 from complications of pneumonia, aged 71.

== Music career ==
Pedreros is considered one of the forerunners of La Nueva Ola in Chile. He was a keyboardist and founder of The Lyons, a support band for Peter Rock during 1958. In 1961 the band became Los Twisters, with the incorporation of singer Luis Dimas.

He is the author of classic songs of the time such as Caprichito, Sueña (with Franz Benko), Al pasa que tiempo (with Hugo Beiza), Ser, Como una sombra and Entre la arena y el mar, among others. Later, he became a music producer, working on various Chilean television programs (including the Festival de Viña del Mar), together with bands such as Sol y Medianoche, in its beginnings (1981). However, nowadays his most recognized musical work is the main theme for the TV show Jappening con ja, titled Ríe (laught), originally written for Silvia Piñeiro's performance in Bim Bam Bum show.

== Television career ==
At the end of the 1960s, he made his debut as producer of El show de Luis Dimas, broadcast by the Peruvian channel Panamericana Televisión. Later, together with his friends and also comedians Fernando Alarcón and Eduardo Ravani, they formed the comedy trio "Los Paparazzi", and were in charge of the direction and production of Dingolondago (TVN, 1976-1978), presented by Enrique Maluenda.

In 1978 they created the successful comedy show Jappening con Ja, which soon became a cultural benchmark on Chilean television. In it, Pedreros developed his acting streak, playing well-remembered characters such as Evaristo Espina (true archetype of the servile employee who wants at all costs to win the appreciation of the boss), the radio host Silverio Silva, El operado (a post-operative patient whose friends make him laugh excessively) or El indio bolsero (a tough North American Indian who always ends up asking for food), among others.

Jappening con Ja was broadcast for 26 uninterrupted years, of which Pedreros was only absent in 1989 and between 2000 and 2001, due to discrepancies with Ravani. In his first year out of Jappening, he was part of the program Éxito on Channel 13, in the section "La Oficina de Al Lado" where he once again played the role of Evaristo Espina. While in his second stage outside the humorous space, he participated in the programs El show de Pepito TV and A la suerte de la Olla, both produced by Canal 13 in 2001. The Jappening was broadcast until 2004 (the last chapter aired on September 14). In 2008 he returned to play "Espinita" in Mandiola & Cía. (Mega), a sort of remake of the La Oficina segment, in which Eduardo Ravani and Fernando Alarcón also participated.
