= Rebeca Ghigliotto =

Chilean actress

Rebeca Antonieta Ghigliotto Villar (18 January 1954 – 20 September 2003) was a Chilean actress of stage plays and television series, or telenovelas. She had three daughters with director Raúl Osorio: Camila, Javiera, and Luciana Osorio Ghigliotto. Ghigliotto died of lung cancer.

== Performances ==
- The Puppet (1984)
- Paper Marriage (1985)
- Bad Angel (1986)
- The Invitation (1987)
- Demigod (1988)
- They by them (1991)
- Love at home (1995)
- Adrenaline (1996)
- Out of Control (1999)
