= Teresita Reyes =

Chilean actress (1950–2025)

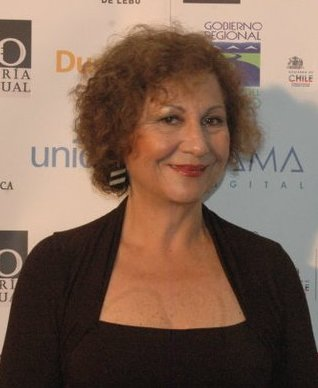
- Reyes in 2011
- Born: María Teresita de Jesús Reyes Aleuanlli; 4 February 1950; Osorno, Chile
- Died: 24 May 2025 (aged 75)
- Occupation: Actress
- Years active: 1981–2024
- Spouse: Jorge Yacaman (m. 1973; died 2016)
- Children: 4

María Teresita de Jesús Reyes Aleuanlli (4 February 1950 – 24 May 2025) was a Chilean actress. She was of Palestinian ancestry on her mother's side. Reyes died from cancer on 24 May 2025, at the age of 75.

== Filmography ==
=== Film ===
- Sussi (film) (1987)
- Te amo (2001)
- Promedio rojo (2004) – Madre de Roberto
- The Toast (2007) – Sandra
- Normal con Alas (2007) – Jovita Maulén
- Santos (2008) – Madre de Busiek
- Apio verde (2013)

=== Television ===
Telenovelas
Year	Title	Role	Channel
1981	Villa Los Aromos	Zenobia	TVN
1982	De cara al mañana	Teresa Canales	TVN
1983	El juego de la vida	Mirta Lopez	TVN
1984	La Represa	Carmen Luisa	TVN
1985	Morir de amor	Coca Cox	TVN
1986	La Quintrala	Magdalena Lisperguer	TVN
1987	Mi nombre es Lara	María Alvarado	TVN
1988	Bellas y audaces	Mamma Sabina	TVN
1994	Top Secret	Corina Díaz de Samoa	Canal 13
1995	El amor está de moda	Lucía	Canal 13
1996	Marrón Glacé, el regreso	Maclovia	Canal 13
1997	Playa Salvaje	Myriam	Canal 13
1998	A todo dar	Brígida	Mega
1999	Algo está cambiando	Sufrida	Mega
2001	Piel Canela	Toya Chandía	Canal 13
2003	Machos	Imelda Robles	Canal 13
2004	Hippie	Mamma Chela	Canal 13
2005	Brujas	Irene León de Altamirano	Canal 13
2005	Gatas y Tuercas	Enriqueta García	Canal 13
2006	Descarado	Victoria "Toya" Peña	Canal 13
2007	Papi Ricky	Olga Mía Cuevas	Canal 13
2008	Lola	Tía Chechi	Canal 13
2009	Corazón Rebelde	Sandra Murua	Canal 13
2010	Primera Dama	Engracia Loyola	Canal 13
2011	Esperanza	Carmen Salazar	TVN
2013	Dos Por Uno	Lucy Santos	TVN
2013	El Regreso	Nina Abdalha "La Turca"	TVN
2015	Eres Mi Tesoro	Delia Contreras	Mega
2018	Verdades Ocultas	Gabriela Marín	Mega
2019–20	Yo soy Lorenzo	Rosa Jaramillo	Mega
