= María José Urzúa =

Chilean actress

- Born: María José Urzúa O'Ryan; 1983 (age 42–43); Santiago, Chile
- Occupation: Actress

María José Urzúa O'Ryan (born 1983) is a Chilean actress. She is the only daughter of the actress Sandra O'Ryan. She studied theatre at Universidad del Desarrollo following her mother's steps. In 2005 joined TVN making a role in the telenovela Versus with Francisco Melo and Cristián Arriagada. María José was nominated for "Best Actress" in Apes Awards. Actually joined MEGA in the comedy/drama show called Otra Vez Papá.

== Filmography ==
=== TV series ===
- El Día menos pensado "El camino" (TVN, 2006) - Lucía
- Otra Vez Papá (MEGA, 2009) - Camila

=== Telenovelas ===
- Versus (TVN) (2005) - Javiera Fuentealta
- Floribella (TVN) (2006) - Lily
