= Gabriela Medina (actress) =

Chilean actress (1935–2025)

Gabriela Amor Medina Espinoza (October 7, 1935 – June 16, 2025) was a Chilean actress and teacher, recognized for her numerous roles in Chilean soap operas, films, and stage plays.

== Personal life ==
She was married to fellow actor César Arredondo with whom she had a son, also actor, Claudio Arredondo, and other 5 children. Claudio is also father of Carolina Arredondo, actrees and Minister of Cultures, Arts and Heritage of Chile.

== Career ==
Medina had supporting roles in several films such as Coronación, Negocio redondo, Sub Terra, Machuca and 03:34 Terremoto en Chile. She also acted in television series such as Ángel Malo, A la Sombra del Ángel, Playa Salvaje and Reserva de familia and in series, including her participation in the original production Los 80.

== Death ==
Medina died on June 16, 2025, at the age of 89.
