= Eduardo Ravani =

Chilean comedian, actor, journalist and television director (1941–2023)

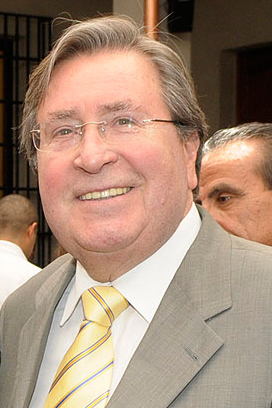
- Ravani in 2011
- Born: Pío Eduardo Apolo Ravani Vergara; 25 October 1941; Santiago, Chile
- Died: 20 March 2023 (aged 81); Santiago, Chile
- Occupations: Comedian, actor, television director, businessman

Pío Eduardo Apolo Ravani Vergara (25 October 1941 – 20 March 2023), better known as Eduardo Ravani, was a Chilean journalist, actor, comedian, television director, and businessman. He was one of the creators, producers, and members of the television show Jappening con Ja.

== Biography ==
Son of Pío Eduardo Gerardo Ravani López and Olga Leonor Vergara Cataldo, Ravani studied at the Manuel Barros Borgoño High School.

Together with his friends Fernando Alarcón and Jorge Pedreros, he produced television programs such as Dingolondango (TVN, 1976–1977). At the same time, and behind the scenes, they made jokes about the television of the time and its greatest exponents. Thus they gave rise to the successful comedy program Jappening con Ja, which was broadcast between 1978 and 2004, marking the comedy culture of the country, with different casts that saw some of the most prominent Chilean and foreign comedians. At the Jappening, Ravani played Willy Zañartu, the ruthless boss in the sketch "The Office" as well as many other characters such as "El Indio", "Giorgio", "Poty", "Pronunciano Perfecto", "Patricio Ayala", "Mario Chucrutberger" and many other impressions.

As a television director, he was in charge of the broadcast of the Viña del Mar International Song Festival seven times.

Ravani also served as a motivational speaker with Fernando Alarcón.

Ravani died from cancer on 20 March 2023, at the age of 81.
