= Fernando Alarcón (actor) =

- Fernando Alarcón in 2011
- Born: Fernando Ernesto Alarcón León; August 12, 1940 (age 86); Santiago, Chile
- Occupation: Actor
- Spouse: Gemma Contreras
- Children: Carolina, Viviana, Fernando J., Patricia, Cristóbal, Tomás

Fernando Ernesto Alarcón León (Santiago, August 12, 1940) is a Chilean actor, journalist, and comedian.

== Biography ==
He completed his secondary education at the Liceo Manuel Barros Borgoño]and subsequently enrolled at the University of Chile, where he earned a professional degree in journalism. He also joined the university's theater school. Together with his friends Jorge Pedreros and Eduardo Ravani, he began by producing television programs such as Dingolondango (TVN, 1976–1978). In 1978, they created the hit comedy show Jappening con Ja, which aired on Televisión Nacional de Chile and later on Megavisión over a total span of 26 years (1978–2004), featuring various casts. On that iconic program, Fernando popularized characters such as Canitrot, Pepito TV, Ele Jota, Segismundo Vega, Licenciado de la Mora, Alaraco, and el Guaripola.

He has also appeared in various other television programs, including: Una vez más hosted by Raúl Matas, Para eso estamos, Si se la puede, gana, and El Show de Pepito TV (2001) on Canal 13; Siempre contigo (2003) and the youth miniseries Don Floro, Xfea2 (2004), Es Cool, and Mitú (2005) on Mega; and *Buenas noches Chile* (2007–2008) on Zona Latina. He also appeared in the comedy series Paola y Miguelito, playing Don Cipriano Rojas—"Paolita's" uncle—who, upon his death, bequeathed his apartment to her and his mischievous son.

He married Chilean journalist Gemma Contreras, and they have two children.

== Filmography ==
=== Films ===
- Héroes: El asilo contra la opresión (2015) - Benito Magallanes
- Talca, París y Londres (2017) - El Profe

=== Telenovelas ===
- De cara al mañana (TVN, 1982) - Carlos Alberto Garrido
- Bellas y audaces (TVN, 1988) - Cameo
- Don Floro (Mega, 2004) - Florencio Díaz "Don Floro"
- Xfea2 (Mega, 2004) - Renato Vercucci
- Es cool (Mega, 2005) - Antonio Guerrero
- Mitú (Mega, 2005) - Eduardo Yávar
- Amores de Calle (TVN, 2010) - Don Juan
- Vampiras (CHV, 2011) - Vladimir Davivenco/Alejandro Romanov

=== TV Shows ===
- Dingolondango (TVN, 1976–1978), productor
- Jappening con Ja (TVN - Mega, 1978–1981, 1983–1989 and 2003–2004) - Productor y actor
- El show de Pepito TV (TVN - Canal 13, 1980–1982 y 2001) - Presentador (Personificando a "Pepito TV")
- La Oficina (Teleonce, 1982) - Actor (Personificando a "Ricardo Canitrot")
- Teleminimundo (TVN, 1982) - Presentador
- Para eso estamos (Canal 13, 1993–2000) - Presentador
- Una Vez Más (Canal 13, 1990–1996) - Coanimador
- Sábado gigante internacional (Canal 13, 1990–2002) - Actor
- Tuti Cuanti (Canal 13, 1995–1997) - Presentador y actor
- Café de noche (Canal 13, 1997) - Coanimador
- Juntos se pasa mejor (Canal 13, 1998) - Presentador
- La mañana del trece (Canal 13, 1999–2001) actor
- A la suerte de la olla (Canal 13, 2001) - Actor.
- Si se la puede, gana (Canal 13, 1998–2002) - Presentador/Reportero familiar
- El Almacén (UCV TV, 2011) - Actor
- Dudo (Canal 13c, 2013) - Invitado
- Paola y Miguelito: la serie (Mega, 2022) - Actor
