= Cesante (film) =

- Theatrical release poster
- Directed by: Ricardo Amunátegui
- Written by: Marco Antonio de la Parra; Nicolás López; Esteban Schneider
- Produced by: Ricardo Amunátegui
- Starring: Coco Legrand
- Edited by: Fernando Valenzuela
- Music by: Luis Bigorra; Joao Beltrán
- Production companies: Emu Films; Sobras Producciones; ADN Digital
- Release date: June 5, 2003
- Running time: 72 minutes
- Country: Chile
- Language: Spanish

Cesante (lit. 'Unemployed'; also known as Cesante: Cada día somos más, lit. 'Unemployed: Every day we are more') is a 2003 Chilean adult animated comedy film directed by Ricardo Amunátegui and written by Marco Antonio de la Parra, Nicolás López and Esteban Schneider. The voice of the protagonist was interpreted by Coco Legrand. The film was considered to represent Chile in the Best Foreign Film category at the 76th Academy Awards, but it was not selected.

== Synopsis ==
Carlos Meléndez, a man who has had bad luck in his life, broke up with his girlfriend and despite the fact that he has run out of gas, water and electricity, he has to go out and look for work. In just 12 hours and at the pace of his hectic clock, he will have to fight with insufferable secretaries, punk thieves, the police force, a topless cafe, rotten hot-dogs and a religious fanatic. All this to be, once and for all, respected.

== Cast ==
The actors participating in this film are:

- Coco Legrand as Carlos Meléndez
- Yasmín Valdés as Leslie / Girl in Cafe
- Gonzalo Robles as Gallo Claudio
- Cristián García-Huidobro as Skinny police officer
- Christián Mejía as Fat police officer / Gangster
- Fredy Guerrero as Drunk
- Claudio Reyes as Seller / Bank Manager
- Katyna Huberman as Wendy
- Natalia Cuevas as Gypsy / Fat old woman
- Vanessa Miller as Punk girl
- Fernando Larraín as Boy Scout / Mobster
- Liliana Ross as Old cuica
- Luis Dubó as Evangelical preacher
- Patricia Irribarra as Old fat woman
- Juan Andrés Salfate as Voice-over

== Release ==
Cesante was originally going to be released on May 29, 2003, but it was delayed a week due to an appeal before the Cinematographic Qualification Council, which initially authorized its exhibition only for those over 18 years of age, later lowering the censorship to 14 years.

== Reception ==
=== Box-office ===
Cesante was on the billboard for three weeks and brought to theaters only 8,643 people, considering it a box-office bomb.

=== Accolades ===
Year	Award / Festival	Category	Recipient	Result	Ref.
2003	Valdivia International Film Festival	Best Chilean Film	Cesante	Won	
2005	Cuenca International Film Festival	Audience Award	Cesante	Won	
