= The Fist of the Condor =

El puño del cóndor
- English-language release poster
- Directed by: Ernesto Díaz Espinoza
- Written by: Ernesto Díaz Espinoza
- Produced by: Michael Bianchi; Diego Moral Heimpell; Nicolás Ibieta; Marko Zaror
- Starring: Marko Zaror; Gina Aguad; Eyal Meyer; Man Soo Yoon; José Manuel; Fernanda Urrejola
- Cinematography: Nicolás Ibieta; Benjamín Luna Vaccarezza
- Edited by: Ernesto Díaz Espinoza
- Music by: Claudio Rocco
- Production companies: Cahuenga Boys; Moral Brothers Entertainment
- Release dates: 27 January 2023 (Rotterdam); 4 April 2023 (U.S. limited)
- Running time: 85 minutes
- Country: Chile
- Language: Spanish

The Fist of the Condor (Spanish: El puño del cóndor) is a 2023 Chilean martial arts film written and directed by Ernesto Díaz Espinoza. Starring Marko Zaror, Gina Aguad, Eyal Meyer, Man Soo Yoon, José Manuel and Fernanda Urrejola.

== Synopsis ==
A group of martial artists from all over the world search for a book that contains the ancient secrets of how to overcome the limits of the human body.

== Cast ==
The actors participating in this film are:

- Marko Zaror as The Warrior
- Eyal Meyer as Kalari
- Gina Aguad as Condor Woman
- Fernanda Urrejola as Marla
- Man Soo Yoon as Wook
- José Manuel as The Opponent
- Cristian Garín as Chief Biker
- Francisco Castro as Man of The Forest
- Andrés Cid as Biker 2
- Francisco Fuentes as Felipe
- Joaquin Puig as Student
- Jorge Vergara as Biker 3
- Daniel Ramirez as Biker 4
- Javiera Ureta as Daughter Marla 1
- Eva Luna Soto as Daughter Marla 2

== Production ==
The production was initially planned as a series but was later defined as a movie. Principal photography began in November 2020 and ended in March 2021 in Chile.

== Release ==
The film had its international premiere on 27 January 2023, at the International Film Festival Rotterdam. It had a limited theatrical release on 4 April 2023, in American theaters. It premiered on Hi-YAH! on 7 April 2023, followed by a Blu-ray release on May 23, 2023.
