= Alejandro Castillo (actor) =

Chilean actor (born 1948)

- Born: Alejandro César Castillo Tirado; April 15, 1948 (age 78); Santiago, Chile
- Education: University of Chile
- Occupation: Actor

Alejandro César Castillo Tirado (born April 15, 1948 in Santiago) is a Chilean actor and theater director.

== Education ==
He began his studies at the School of Theater of the University of Chile. He continued his education in Paris, France, where he studied at both the Conservatoire National Supérieur d'Art Dramatique and the Conservatoire de Littérature Générale et Comparée at the Sorbonne University. Castillo was a member of the Teatro Nuevo Popular and co-founder of Teatro Joven (1974–1978).

== Career ==
He started his television career at the age of 28 in 1976, on the Canal 13 telenovela, J. J. Juez (1976), where he played the supporting character, Gonzalo. Ten years later, he portrayed Amadeo Rivera in the station's iconic telenovela, Ángel malo (1986), followed by rules in La Invitación (1987) and Villa Nápoli (1991).

He subsequently switched channels, appearing in Trampas y caretas, his first fictional work for TVN. This led to roles in the telenovelas Jaque Mate, Rompecorazón, Estúpido Cupido, and Sucupira. The latter marked his last production for the state-owned channel before he moved to Mega in 1997. At Mega, he played various roles in Rossabella, Algo está cambiando, and A todo dar, starring in the latter alongside Liliana García and Gloria Laso.

Following his time in Mega, Castillo returned to Canal 13 between 2000 and 2004, where he was part of the cast of three telenovelas, including the successful Machos, before moving back to TVN. There, he played the antagonistic character of Ambrosio in Amor en tiempo récord (2006). Castillo later participated in Decibel 110 on Mega. Since then, he has focused on developing his career in theater, participating in plays such as El amor by Carla Cristi, directed by Javier Casanga, and Hermana by Pascal Rambert.

His first appearance in film was in 1996 when he worked under the direction of Tatiana Gaviola in El último hombre (The Last Man). Nine years later, he returned to the screen in Rodrigo Goncalves' feature film Horcón, al sur de ninguna parte (Horcón, South of Nowhere). The young Chilean director Ernesto Díaz has consistently included Castillo in his films, featuring him in his debut feature, Kiltro (2006), and in Mandrill (2010).

In addition to his performance career, Castillo has also taught at several higher education institutions, including the Fernando González School of Theater, the Domingo Tessier School of Theater, the University of the Americas, UNIACC University, ARCIS University, and the University of Chile.

== Filmography ==
=== Films ===
- Mi último hombre by Tatiana Gaviola.
- Horcón, al sur de ninguna parte by Rodrigo Gonçalves.
- Kiltro by Ernesto Díaz.
- Mandrill by Ernesto Díaz.
- Run over by Gopal Ibarra Roa and Visnu Ibarra Roa

=== Television ===
Year	Title	Role	Channel
1975	J. J. Juez	Gonzalo	Canal 13
1981	Amelia	Padre Roberto	Canal 13
1986	Ángel malo	Amadeo Rivera	Canal 13
1987	La Invitación	Marco Costa	Canal 13
1991	Villa Nápoli	Byron Trigal	Canal 13
1992	Trampas y caretas	Marco Villagrán	TVN
1993	Jaque mate	Sebastián Duval	TVN
1994	Rompe corazón	Gabriel Quintero	TVN
1995	Estúpido Cupido	Alfonso Campino	TVN
1996	Sucupira	Ramiro Portela	TVN
1997	Rossabella	Aníbal Sánchez	Mega
1998	A todo dar	Andrés Del Río / Tambito	Mega
1999	Algo está cambiando	Adrián Zúñiga	Mega
2000	Sabor a ti	Rodolfo Cifuentes	Canal 13
2003	Machos	Fanor Cruchaga	Canal 13
2004	Tentación	Gonzalo Cifuentes	Canal 13
2005	Amor en tiempo record	Ambrosio Yávar	TVN
2011	Decibel 110	Alfredo Alemparte	Mega
2012	La Sexóloga	Antonio Aravena	Chilevisión

== Theatre ==
=== As actor ===
- "El Pastor Lobo" de Lope de Vega.
- "Life Is a Dream" de Calderón.
- "Le Bourgeois gentilhomme" de Molière.
- "The Trickster of Seville and the Stone Guest" de Tirso de Molina.
- "Monogamia" de M.A. de la Parra.
- "Después de mi el diluvio" de Luïsa Cunillé
- "Los cristianos" de Lucas Hnath
- ”Un espejo” de Sam Holcroft
- "El Amor" de Carla Zuñiga

=== As director ===
- "Oedipus Rex" de Sophocles.
- "Casa de Muñecas" de Ibsen.
- "La noche de Madame Lucienne" de Copi.
- "Moscas Sobre el Mármol" de Luis Alberto Heiremans.
- "El Marinero" de Fernando Pessoa.
- "El mal de la muerte" de Marguerite Duras.
- "Pequeños Crímenes Conyugales" Éric-Emmanuel Schmitt.
- "Visitando al señor Green" Jeff Baron.
- "El Gran Regreso" de Serge Kribus.
- “Todas esas cosas maravillosas “ de Duncan Mc Millan
- “Ardiente Paciencia" de Antonio Skarmeta.
- “Coronacion" de José Pineda, a partir de la novela de José Donoso.
- “Últimos Remordimientos antes del Olvido” de Jean Luc Lagarce.
- “Después de mi el diluvio” de Lluïsa Cunillé.
