= Graduados, historias que no se olvidan =

- Clockwise from top left: Andrés Jalifa (Marcial Tagle), María Laura Falsetti (Fernanda Urrejola), Pablo Flores (Ricardo Fernández), Patricia Rojas (Bárbara Ruiz-Tagle), Francisco "Tuca" Allende (Cristian Carvajal), Verónica Sarmiento (Elvira Cristi)
- Genre: Comedy
- Created by: Sebastián Ortega
- Written by: Carlos Galofré; Rodrigo Ossandón; Sandra Arriagada
- Directed by: Mauricio Bustos
- Starring: Fernanda Urrejola; Marcial Tagle; Ricardo Fernández; Cristián Carvajal; Pedro Campos
- Theme music composer: Fito Páez
- Opening theme: "A rodar mi vida"
- Country of origin: Chile
- Original language: Spanish
- No. of seasons: 1
- No. of episodes: 201

Production
- Producers: Vicente Sabatini; Cecilia Stoltze

Original release
- Network: Chilevisión
- Release: March 3, 2013 – January 10, 2014

Related
- La Sexóloga; Las 2 Carolinas

Graduados, historias que no se olvidan (Spanish: The Graduates, stories that may not be forgotten) is a 2013 Chilean telenovela, a remake of the 2012 Argentine telenovela Graduados. It was aired by Chilevisión, and the main actors are Marcial Tagle, Fernanda Urrejola, Ricardo Fernández and Bárbara Ruiz-Tagle.

== Plot ==
The telenovela began in a 1993 high-school graduation. María Laura Falsetti was the girlfriend of Pablo Flores, the school's bully. She left the graduation party when she saw him having sex with another student. Andrés Jalifa, who was secretly in love with her, helped her to leave the graduation party, and had sex in the car. Unaware of this one-night relation, Clemente Falsetti ordered his daughter and Flores to get married, as she got pregnant.

The narration makes then a time skip to 2013. Pablo works at Clemente's firm, and Andrés is a dog walker, hired by chance by María Laura. She confirmed with a DNA test that her son Martín was the biological son of Andrés, not the son of Pablo as she had always thought. Most plots revolve around the consequences of this reveal.

== Production ==
The telenovela is a remake of the successful 2012 Argentine telenovela Graduados. It is the first remake produced at the channel Chilevisión. The first actors who signed for the work were Fernanda Urrejola, Marcial Tagle and Ricardo Fernández. The Argentine telenovela made an extensive use of 1980s music, in most cases 1980s Argentine rock. The Chilean remake used both Chilean music bands, such as Upa! and Los Prisioneros, and Argentine bands highly successful in Chile, such as Soda Stereo, Charly García and Virus.

Unlike the Argentine telenovela, the Chilean remake is not focused in nostalgia of the 1980s, but in the 1990s. Mirroring similar productions from the Argentine telenovela, the production included an homage to the old Chilean TV show Extra Jóvenes, in a flashback with the main characters attending to it. The TV host Daniel Fuenzalida, who worked at that program, took part in the fiction.

== Reception ==
Graduados was first aired in March 2013, and got more rating than competitor channels but by a narrow margin. On March 3 it got 13.9 rating points, against Mundos opuestos 2 in Channel 13 and Apuesto por ti in TVN, both with 13.7 points, and Pablo Escobar, el patrón del mal by Mega with 13 points.

== Cast ==
- Marcial Tagle as Andrés Jalifa
- Fernanda Urrejola as María Laura "Loli" Falsetti
- Ricardo Fernández as Pablo Flores
- Bárbara Ruiz-Tagle as Ximena Benítez / Patricia Rojas
- Cristián Carvajal as Francisco "Tuca" Allende
- Elvira Cristi as Verónica Sarmiento
- Pedro Campos as Martín Flores/Jalifa
- Eduardo Barril as Clemente Falsetti
- Fernando Farías as Amir Jalifa
- María Elena Duvauchelle as Hannah Talla
- Natalia Valdebenito as Alejandra Aguirre
- Guido Vecchiola as Guillermo Aliaga
- Elisa Alemparte as Claudia Jalifa
- César Sepúlveda as Augusto Flores
- Natalia Grez as Clara
- Paulina Hunt as Betty
- Aldo Parodi as Walter
- Carolina Mestrovic as Sofía Matic
- Felipe Álvarez as Juan José Correa "Juanjo"

=== Guest cast ===
- Claudia di Girolamo as Cristina "Titi" Arregui
- Juan Falcón as Fernando Ponte
- Alessandra Guerzoni as Juana López
- Sandra O'Ryan as Inés Matic
- Jaime McManus as Daniel Jalifa
- Catherine Mazoyer as Sandra Assad
- Macarena Sánchez as Azul Vega
- Javiera Osorio as Luna Ponte
- Benito Quercia as Musalem Jalifa
- Grimanesa Jiménez as Marta Quiñones
- Gabrio Cavalla as Dr. Alfredo Ripstein
- Eyal Meyer as Rodrigo
