= Marko Zaror =

Chilean martial artist and actor

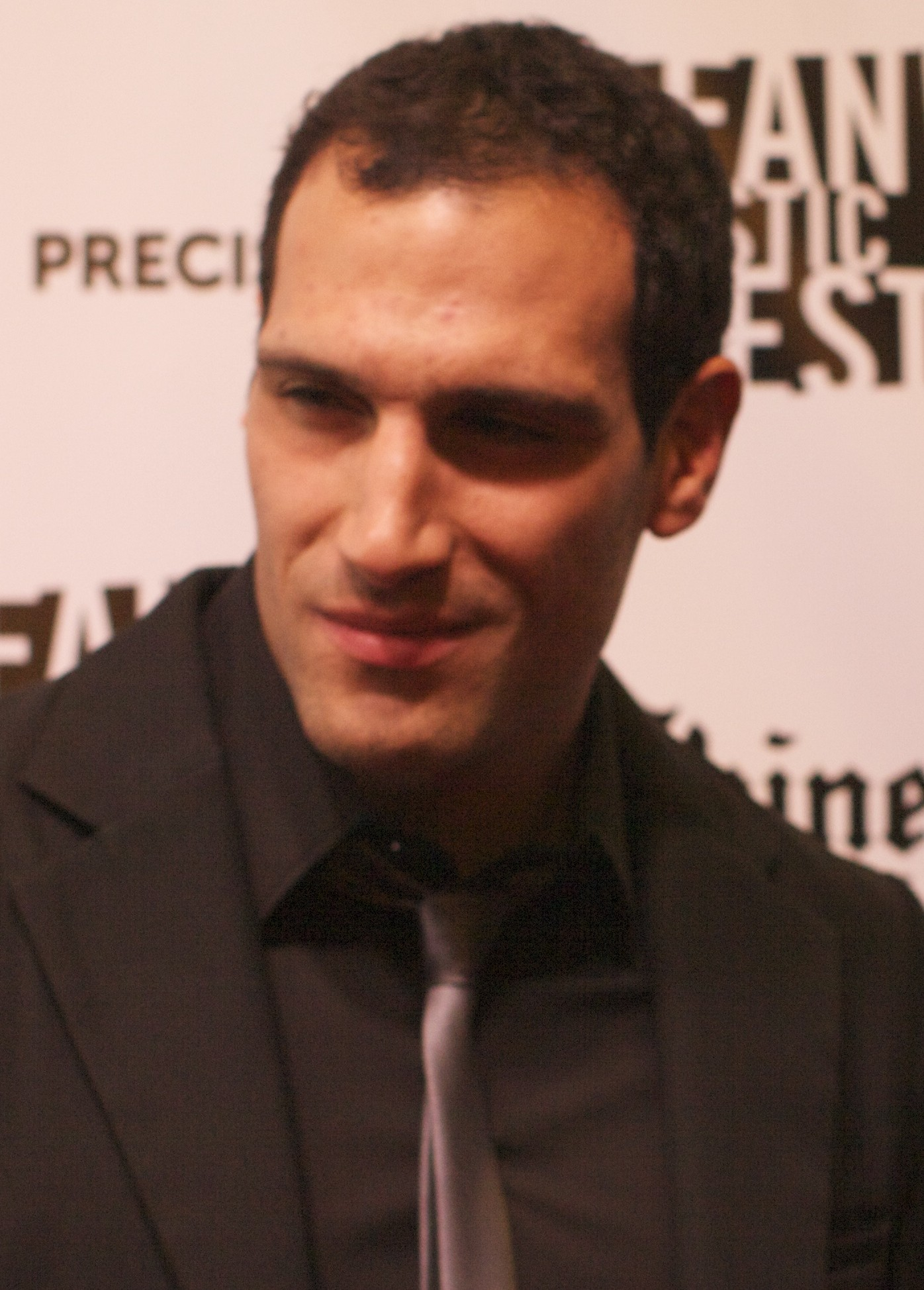
- Zaror in 2013
- Born: Marko Zaror Aguad; 10 June 1978 (age 47); Santiago, Chile
- Occupation: Actor
- Years active: 1998–present

Marko Zaror Aguad (born 10 June 1978) is a Chilean martial artist and actor.

== Early life ==
Zaror was born in Santiago, Chile to Chilean father Fernando Zaror and mother Gina Aguad of Peruvian and Palestinian descent. He started self training in martial arts when he was six years old. He has trained mainly in taekwondo and kickboxing, and also judo, aikido, wing chun and shotokan karate.

== Career ==
Zaror has appeared in several Spanish language action films, including Chinango and Kiltro, and acted as stuntman for Dwayne "The Rock" Johnson in the 2003 film The Rundown. In 2010, he played bloodthirsty Colombian prisoner/fighter Raul "Dolor" Quinones in the film Undisputed III: Redemption, which was his first American film and the first time he spoke English in a film (he was previously only a stunt man). In Machete Kills (2013), he played an associate of main villain Luther Voz (Mel Gibson), with "Zaror" being his character's name; and was seen as a mixed martial arts competition finalist in the Bollywood movie Sultan. He has worked with Robert Rodriguez in several projects. Zaror is the only Latin American action film star devoted specifically to action films.

== Personal life ==
Zaror is of Peruvian and Palestinian descent.

Zaror lives in Los Angeles, California. He has adopted the carnivore diet.

== Filmography ==
=== Film ===
Year	Title	Role	Notes
1998	Juan Camaney en Acapulco	Kaoma	
2001	Hard As Nails	Russian Bodyguard 1	
2002	Into the Flames	Max	
2006	Kiltro	Zamir	
2007	Mirageman	Maco Gutierrez / Mirageman	Also producer
2007	Chinango	Braulio Bo	
2009	Mandrill	Antonio Espinoza / Mandrill	Also producer
2010	Undisputed III: Redemption	Raul "Dolor" Quinones	Direct-to-video
2013	Machete Kills	Zaror	
2014	Redeemer	Nicky Pardo	Also producer
2016	Sultan	Marcus	
2017	Savage Dog	Jean-Pierre "The Executioner" Rastignac	Direct-to-video
2018	The Green Ghost	Drake	Also producer
2019	Alita: Battle Angel	Ajakutty	
2020	Invincible	Brock Cortez	Direct-to-video
2023	The Fist of the Condor	The Warrior	Also producer
2023	John Wick: Chapter 4	Chidi	
2024	The Killer's Game	Botas Gasevich	
2025	Affinity	Bruno	Also producer, screenwriter
2025	Fight or Flight	Chayenne	
2025	Diablo	"El Corvo"	Also story
2115	100 Years^{†}	Bad Guy	Short film; Posthumous release

Key
†	Denotes films that have not yet been released

=== Television ===
Year	Title	Role	Notes
2016	From Dusk till Dawn: The Series	Zolo	3 episodes
2017	Marvel's The Defenders	Shaft	1 episode

=== Music video ===
Year	Title	Artist	Ref.
2015	"Confident"	Demi Lovato	
