= Eyal Meyer =

Chilean actor

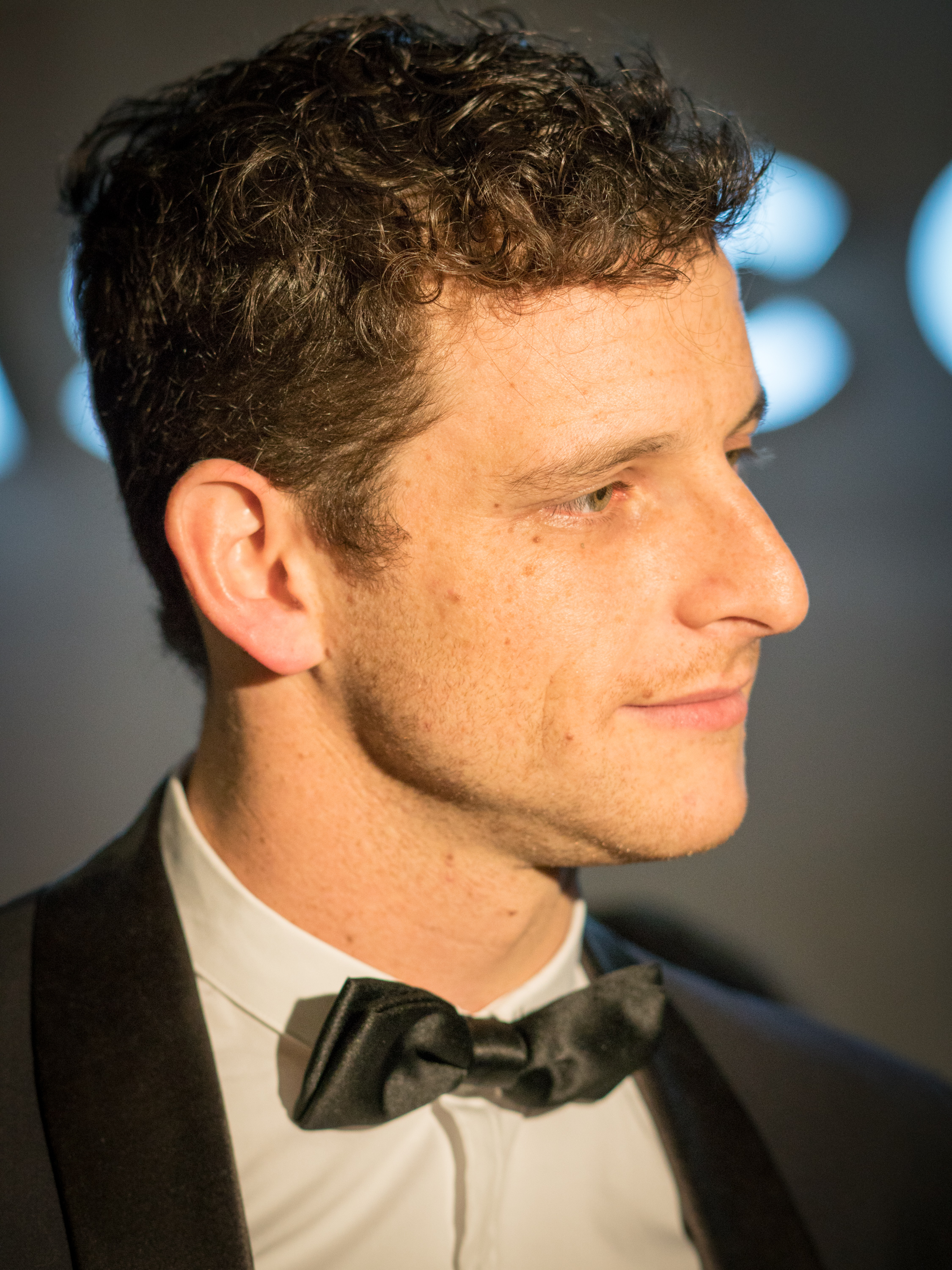
- Meyer in 2017
- Born: Eyal Meyer Shevat; 10 December 1985 (age 40); Santiago, Chile
- Education: University of Chile
- Occupations: Actor, kalaripayattu instructor

Eyal Meyer Shevat (Hebrew: אייל מאיר שבט; born 10 December 1985) is a Chilean actor and instructor of Kalaripayattu, who also holds German and Israeli citizenship.

== Early life and education ==
Meyer was born on 10 December 1985 in Santiago, Chile. His father is a Chilean-born electrical civil engineer of German-Jewish descent and his mother is an Israeli business administrator of Hungarian-Jewish and Polish-Jewish descent. His paternal grandparents immigrated to Chile escaping Nazi Germany, and his maternal grandparents fled Hungary to Haifa during World War II. His parents met and married there in Israel, while his father was pursuing a master's degree at the Faculty of Electrical Engineering at Technion.

He was admitted to the theatrical acting program at the Faculty of Arts of the University of Chile in 2004, having been ranked first in the entrance exam. In 2007 he obtained a Bachelor of Arts with a specialization in theatrical acting and graduated as an actor in 2010, dedicating the thesis in Hebrew to his grandmother, Lea Shevat.

At the same time as studying acting, Meyer began practicing the martial art Kalaripayattu in 2006, a discipline he learned during several trips to India.

== Acting career ==
Meyer's first experience with acting was at the age of 16 with street theatre.

He appeared occasionally on television in series such as Soltera otra vez (2011), playing one of the protagonist's suitors. This gave his career a boost, opening the door to major productions such as Downhill, directed by Patricio Valladares; Fuerzas Especiales, directed by José Miguel Zúñiga; Videoclub, by Pablo Illanes; and the acclaimed Berlin Film Festival Golden Bear-winning film Gloria, directed by Sebastián Lelio.

On a national TV series he has had prominent roles in Juana Brava and Las 2 Carolinas, directed by Vicente Sabatini, as well as in Gemelas as the antagonist, directed by Rodrigo Velásquez, and in La colombiana, directed by Germán Barriga.

In 2023 he starred in The Fist of the Condor, where he showcased his Kalaripayattu martial arts abilities.

In January 2026 he starred TVN's vertical thriller Mi marido me robó la memoria, portraying Gabriel Lira. The series reached over 26.6 million views in its first 13 days of release, with Meyer describing this as "very surprising". In September and October, Meyer was part of Chicago: el musical, a revamped Chilean version of the Broadway classic, which was performed in Santiago.

== Other projects ==
Since a young age, Eyal Meyer has participated in modeling.

In April 2018 he made his debut as a radio host on FM Dos, a role he continues to hold.

In 2020 he opened Chile's first Kalaripayattu center, called Mauna Kalari, where he serves as an instructor of the discipline.

In 2025 Meyer was legally and formally recognized as the Representative of Kalaripayattu in Chile, after appearing before the Technical Commission of Martial Arts in October 2024.

In November of the same year, Meyer joined the third season of the reality show Mundos Opuestos (Opposite Worlds) on Canal 13 as a participant. He ended up being the last one eliminated before the final stage of the program.

In April 2026, he joined the TV show Fiebre de baile on Chilevisión as a new participant. He was eliminated on 26 April 2026.

== Personal life ==
Meyer is ethnically Jewish, but does not practice Judaism or any other religion. He speaks Spanish, Hebrew, and English, and also some Malayalam. He has played the bass since 14, and also plays piano and guitar.

He is straight but often faces speculation about his sexuality, with people claiming he is gay. He explains that this is partly due to his laid-back personality and his ability to talk to women easily without romantic intentions, but mainly because he keeps his personal life private and doesn't share details about his relationships or family life on social media. Meyer has also stated that he has no issues with doing gay scenes, portraying gay characters, or performing nude scenes. He was married to theatre designer Francisca Correa for 14 years, with whom has two children.

== Filmography ==
=== Film ===
Year	Title	Role	Notes	Ref.
2011	Otra película de amor	Adonis		
2013	Gloria	Theo		
2013	The Night Face Up	Voice	Short film	
2013	The Dance of Reality	Grandpa Jodo - Herculean Man		
2013	Videoclub	Father Washington Moore		
2014	Fuerzas especiales	Cape Arriagada		
2014	Blood Sugar Baby	Yuri		
2016	Downhill	Charlie		
2018	Dry Martina	Young friend		
2018	Too Late to Die Young	Jaime		
2021	Cydonia	Preston Bowman	Short film	
2022	Lo que queda entre nosotros	Marcos	Short film	
2023	The Fist of the Condor	Kalari		
2023	Outsider Girls	Tomás		
2023	El Conde	Rugby player		
2023	Sayen: Desert Road	Aguilar		
2024	Sayen: The Huntress	Aguilar		
2025	Dancing in the Ring	Doctor		

=== Television ===
Year	Title	Role	Notes	Ref.
2009	Mi primera vez		Miniseries, 1 episode	
2010–2012	Teatro en Chilevisión	Milko	2 episodes	
2010	Mujeres de lujo	Guard	2 episodes	
2010	Feroz	Jean Pierre	3 episodes	
2011	Primera dama	Knut Hassan	4 episodes	
2012	Diario secreto de una profesional	Vedetto	1 episode	
2012–2013	Soltera otra vez	Víctor Andrade	2 episodes	
2012	La sexóloga	Amador Schweizer	7 episodes	
2012	Centro de alumnos	Luciano	3 episodes	
2013	Graduados	Rodrigo	4 episodes	
2013	Socias	Arturo	2 episodes	
2014	Infieles	Chalo	Mini series, 1 episode	
2014	Las 2 Carolinas	Maximiliano Montero	Main role, 112 episodes	
2014	Roommates	Yoga instructor; Miguel	2 episodes (2 roles)	
2015	Juana Brava	Esteban Quiroz	Mini series, 5 episodes	
2015	Lo que callamos las mujeres	Manuel; Ricardo; Carlos	3 episodes (3 roles)	
2016	20añero a los 40	Aquiles Cohen	4 episodes	
2016	Bala Loca	X Man	Mini series, 1 episode	
2016-2017	Preciosas	Nicolás Infante	Main role, 105 episodes	
2017	La colombiana	Igor Ramírez	Main role	
2017-2018	Dime quién fue	Rafael Eyzaguirre	Main role, 89 episodes	
2019-2020	Gemelas	Antonio Martínez	Main role, 138 episodes	
2023	Dime con quién andas	Rabbi	Main role, 55 episodes	
2026	Mi marido me robó la memoria	Gabriel Lira	Vertical mini series	
