= Claudio Reyes =

Chilean actor and comedian (1960–2024)

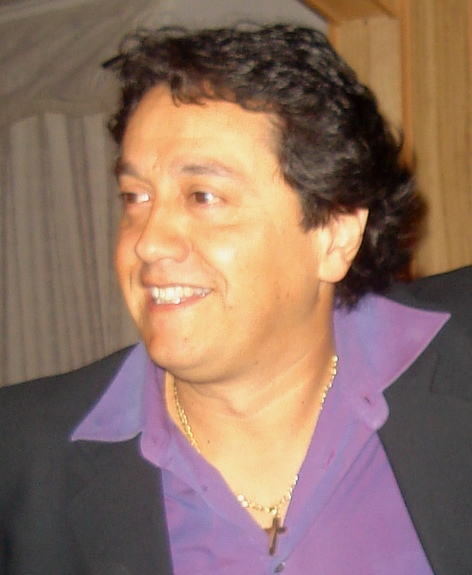
- Reyes in 2011
- Born: Claudio Emilio Reyes Norambuena; 5 May 1960; Longaví, Chile
- Died: 13 July 2024 (aged 64); Santiago, Chile
- Occupations: Actor, comedian, singer, politician

Claudio Reyes (5 May 1960 – 13 July 2024) was a Chilean singer, actor, politician and comedian.

== Life and career ==
He began his television career in 1984, participating in supporting roles in the soap operas La torre 10, La represa and Bellas y audaces. His last participation in soap operas was in Piel canela in 2001

In 1989, he ventured into singing by participating in the soundtrack of the television series A la sombra del Ángel, in which he also acted. "Por qué llora la tarde" (originally performed by Brazilian Antonio Marcos) was known in the Reyes version for its chorus "The afternoon is crying and it's because of you", becoming a radio hit that year.

In the 1990s he began his career as a comedian on the program Jappening con ja, where he is remembered for characters such as "El Huaso Clemente", "Clementina", "Tutín", "Chalo" (Le Bisoñé hair salon) and "Charly Badulaque"; The latter became very popular around the year 2000, when the program was practically based on its routine. Later he was a frequent comedian on Morandé con compañía a TV show from Mega. The success of the character allowed him to attend as a guest on stellar television programs of the time such as Viva el lunes. And a film titled "Kuma Channel: The True Story of Charly Badulaque" was even produced, which, according to Reyes himself, "follows the life of Charly, a villager who dreams of becoming an entertainer and thus fulfilling his late father's wishes" Charly Badulaque would be the most recognized character and show of his career.

He was elected councilor for the commune of Puente Alto, representing the Independent Democratic Union (UDI), for the period 2004–2008, obtaining 12.00% of the vote, equivalent to 12,456 votes.

He worked on the program De aquí no sale on UCV Televisión as a guest panellist in 2016. In 2021 he worked on the program Gato por Liebre on Radio Agricultura.

== Personal life ==
He had seven children with six different women. His last wife was Yanet Alfaro. Reyes suffered from high blood pressure and type 2 diabetes mellitus. On April 23, 2023, he suffered a mild heart attack, from which he managed to recover.

Claudio Reyes died around 11 p.m. on Saturday, July 13, 2024, as a result of a heart attack while he was celebrating a friend's birthday.

== Controversies ==
In 1989 he was a judge at the Viña del Mar International Song Festival and met who would briefly be his partner; María Verónica Pinochet Molina, daughter of Augusto Pinochet Hiriart and granddaughter of dictator Augusto Pinochet. Supposedly she frequented him on the Chilefilms recording sets and as a result he was separated from his work by director Vicente Sabatini, and, according to Reyes, banned from the television series for life.

In April 2023, comedian Óscar Gangas claimed that Reyes attacked fellow comedian Jajá Calderón, after an imitation of President Gabriel Boric at a meeting of friends. His own son, José Reyes Rojas, publicly called him out by saying that it was not the first time he had done it, and that he thought he had not been wrong "in marking my distance from a far-right fanatic".

== Filmography ==
=== Film ===
Year	Title	Character
2000	Kuma Channel: La verdadera historia de Charly Badulaque	Charly Badulaque
2002	El fotógrafo	Gardel
2003	Cesante	seller / bank manager
2009	Desorejado	Gonzalo Calvo de Barrientos
2009	Argentino QL	Charly Badulaque

=== Telenovelas ===
year	Title	Character
1984	La represa	Johnny Cereceda
1984	La torre 10	Luchito Oyarce
1985	Marta a las Ocho	Nelson
1986	La villa	Porky López
1987	Mi Nombre es Lara	Alfredo Gómez
1988	Bellas y audaces	Marcello Bruni
1988	Las dos caras del amor	Javier/Daslav Merovic
1989	A la sombra del ángel	Julián Torreblanca
1990	El milagro de vivir	Lalo Moreira
1994	Rojo y miel	Bruno Bertuni
2001	Piel canela	Moncho Cárdenas

=== Series and unitaries ===
- Jappening con ja (Megavisión, 1995–2001) – «El Huaso Clemente», «Clementina», «Tutín» (La Oficina), «Chalo» (peluquería Le Bisoñé) y «Charly Badulaque»
- Posta Lo Matta (La Red, 1991) – Artenor Toro «Torito»
- Infieles (Chilevisión, 2013) – Capítulo «Cazatalentos»
- Cesantes (Chilevisión, 2014) – Capítulo «El embromado»
- Infieles (Chilevisión, 2014) – Capítulo «Ojos que no ven»
