= Diablo (2025 film) =

- Theatrical release poster
- Directed by: Ernesto Díaz Espinoza
- Screenplay by: Mat Sansom
- Story by: Mat Sansom; Scott Adkins; Marko Zaror; Ernesto Díaz Espinoza
- Produced by: Craig Baumgarten; Clay Epstein; Alvaro Gutierrez; Jason Gurvitz; Scott Adkins; Marko Zaror
- Starring: Scott Adkins; Marko Zaror; Alana De La Rossa
- Cinematography: Niccolo De La Fere
- Edited by: Ernesto Díaz Espinoza
- Music by: Rocco
- Production companies: Vault Entertainment; Film Mode Entertainment; Daro Films
- Distributed by: Lionsgate; Grindstone Entertainment Group
- Release date: June 13, 2025
- Running time: 91 minutes
- Countries: Colombia; United States
- Languages: English; Spanish

Diablo is a 2025 action thriller film directed by Ernesto Díaz Espinoza, written by Mat Sansom and starring Scott Adkins, Marko Zaror and Alana De La Rossa.

The film was released in select theaters, video on demand and digital platforms on June 13, 2025.

It was the #1 film in the world on Paramount + and was #1 in Argentina, Bolivia, Chile, Colombia, Costa Rica, Dominican Republic, Ecuador, Guatemala, Honduras, Mexico, Nicaragua, Panama, Paraguay, Peru, Salvador, Uruguay and Venezuela.

It proved to be a streaming hit in the US too, reaching #3 on Amazon Prime's top ten and staying in the top ten for just under two weeks.

It was also a top ten streaming success in both the UK and Brazil, reaching #7 on Rakuten TV in the UK and #3 on Globoplay, Brazil's most popular streaming service.

== Plot ==
Kris Chaney, a former bank-robber is released from prison. Clearly carrying the weight of his past, he sets out to fulfill a promise he once made to the deceased mother of a teenage girl named Elisa. His mission takes him to Colombia, where he kidnaps Elisa — the daughter of Vicente, a powerful cartel boss and Kris’ former criminal partner who betrayed him many years before. Kris intercepts Elisa on her way to school and forces her into a desperate cross-country escape. Elisa is reluctant to go with him because she is justifiably unsure of his motivations. Meanwhile, Vicente puts a massive bounty on Kris's head, promising the reward to anyone who can bring his daughter home.

Among those who answer the call is a mysterious and psychopathic hitman known only as El Corvo. As Kris and Elisa remain on the run, the truth slowly comes to light: Kris is actually Elisa's biological father. He kidnapped her not out of revenge against Vicente, but to rescue her from a life with him — this is the promise that Kris made to her mother before she died.

During a stop at a roadside diner, a gang capture Elisa, take her to their hideout and contact Vicente in order to collect the reward. Soon after, both Kris and El Corvo arrive at the hideout, triggering a brutal shootout and violent brawl. Kris and Elisa barely escape and then go on the run again. Tensions continue between them but they also continue to bond. Kris notices that Elisa wears a diamond necklace that he once gave to her mother.

After stealing a truck to continue their journey, Elisa begins to once again doubt Kris and his vision of a better life for her. Convinced that life with him may be worse for her than with Vicente and angry and emotional that Kris won't be a proper father to her, she steals the truck and leaves him behind.

While trying to call Vincente for help, she’s tracked down by both Kris and El Corvo. The confrontation escalates when El Corvo takes Elisa hostage, forcing an emotional moment between Kris and Elisa wherein she breaks down and reveals to El Corvo that Kris is her real father. She clearly now believes this is true and it signifies that, despite their ongoing tensions, her and Kris have now built a real connection.

Kris is then knocked unconscious. He wakes up bound, precariously balanced on an upturned tire and with a noose around his neck in the middle of a public square. Vicente and his men find Kris, cut him down and after a confrontation it is revealed that El Corvo has his own vendetta against Vicente — a deeply personal grudge that drives him to destroy everything Vicente holds dear.

El Corvo calls Vicente and reveals Elisa's location: an abandoned factory. Vicente arrives at the factory with his men and an unarmed Kris in tow. El Corvo effortlessly ambushes them, killing Vicente's crew and capturing Vicente. He forces Vicente to watch as Elisa, bound and helpless, is slowly pulled toward a massive metal-shredding machine. Kris then appears and engages El Corvo in an epic fight whilst Vicente frantically tries to stop the machine. In the chaos, El Corvo forces Vicente to confess a long-buried secret: years ago, Vicente hired him to murder Elisa's mother when she was going to leave him, taking Elisa with her.

As Elisa is moments away from being crushed, an injured Kris tells her to throw the diamond necklace he once gave to her mother into the machine. The diamonds jam the mechanism sufficiently for her to free herself. Badly injured but determined, Kris then strikes El Corvo as he continues to try and kill Elisa. Vicente also attacks El Corvo with a saw. The struggle ends when El Corvo is injured and drags Vicente over the edge of the machine, causing them both to fall from a great height. A badly bleeding Kris, seemingly mortally injured lays on the floor, a hysterical Elisa cries over him, begging him not to die.

Later, Elisa lays flowers on a grave ... but then it is revealed that it's not Kris' grave, it is her mother's. Kris then appears and also lays down a flower. Kris tells her that keeping the promise he made to her mother was worth it and they hold hands, finally united in love and grief as father and daughter.

In a final flashback, it’s revealed that only Vicente's body was ever found after the fall – leaving El Corvo's fate uncertain.

== Cast ==
- Scott Adkins as Kris Chaney
- Marko Zaror as "El Corvo"
- Alana De La Rossa as Elisa
- Lucho Velasquez as Vicente
- Diana Hoyos as Alex

== Production ==
=== Development ===
Diablo was reported to be in pre-production stages in May 2023. with Scott Adkins and Marko Zaror cast in the lead roles. Also cast were Colombian actors Alana De La Rossa, Lucho Velasco and Diana Hoyos.

=== Filming ===
Principal photography began on February 13, 2024, in Colombia. Filming had wrapped by March 9, 2024.

== Release ==
In May 2024, Grindstone Entertainment Group acquired North American distribution rights for the film. The film was released in select theaters, video on demand, and digital platforms on June 13, 2025.

It received a theatrical release in Brazil and across the Middle-East.

== Reception ==
On the review aggregator Rotten Tomatoes, 71% of 17 critics' reviews are positive.

Both The Action Elite and Action-Flix gave it a 4/5 rating and said it 'exceeds all expectations' and is a 'masterclass in Martial Arts action cinema' respectively.

Keith-Loves-Movies rated it at 88% and praised the story, action, soundtrack and performance's, regarding it as Espinoza's best film to date.

Kung-Fu Kingdom gave it a 9/10 rating and said it was 'a home run of the sort that breaks the bat into a million pieces'.

411 MANIA scored it a perfect 10 describing it as a 'modern masterpiece' and an 'absolute must see'.

Fandor rated it as the 'Best action film of 2025' and said it had a 'pretty great, emotional story'.

Bulletproof Action said 'Diablo is the total package, a compelling story that is well structured and executed with Adkins and Zaror delivering the best acting performances of their careers'.

TKD Life Magazine said 'The script is good and plays out in a well told and tightly edited way. The filmmakers start this 91 minute rollercoaster ride by jumping immediately into the story and the action; however, the artful execution never leaves the viewer confused about what is happening, or how we got here. This is good storytelling.

JoBlo regarded it as 'a unique story of revenge' that 'actually has some heart and humor' and provides Adkins with a role that is 'more nuanced than the stereotypical action lead'.

Worldfilmgeek gave it an A− score and said 'It’s round three between martial arts powerhouses Scott Adkins and Marko Zaror in this exciting action packed thriller from Zaror collaborator Ernesto Diaz Espinoza' and 'Another major plus is the script by Mat Sansom'.

Film International stated that it was 'A well made low-budget film with characters that escape one-dimensional stereotyping'

The Last Thing I See said 'It delivers the goods' and is 'Epic as all hell'.

Movies films and flix called it 'A pretty fun and pretty over-the-top Scott Adkins action romp'.

Screen Anarchy called it 'a very satisfying clash of two international indie action titans'.

Cineparenting said 'the movie is a relentless, blood-soaked thrill ride packed with heart-pounding martial arts combat, shocking twists, and emotional depth'. Also, that it 'mixes explosive fight sequences with moments of surprising emotional weight' and 'the screenplay keeps viewers guessing until the final moments'.

Crooked-Marquee stated 'Espinoza keeps the crisp, kinetic action moving from the first moment to the last'.

We-Live-Entertainment gave it a 7/10 rating and said 'Zaror is a beast, and it’s fun watching him tear his way through basically everything in his attempts to reach his targets. Meanwhile, Adkins is selling his role as a figure from a past that this kidnapped girl never knew. Making all this come together in thrilling ways makes the action land with even greater impact. Yes, there's still plenty of silliness here, but it’s silliness that pays off with action aplomb'.

But-Why-Tho gave it a 7/10 and said Diablo is what you want your actioner to be. It’s loud, it doesn’t take itself too seriously, and its hero and villain work perfectly off each other.

Fortress-Of-Solitude said 'Diablo sizzles with outstanding action' and 'It’s fist-pumping action to the core, and everyone involved in Diablo knows what the viewer is here for, dialing it up to the max. Honestly, don’t be surprised if this becomes your next Friday night delight'.

The Bulwark said 'Diablo is a masterpiece of a certain sort of movie—the low-budget, high-octane, straight-to-video martial arts action flick' and that 'it kicks ass' and 'has the best fight choreography you’ll see in a movie this year'

The Guardian provided a mixed review, stating: 'It's deranged antagonist might be an Anton Chigurh rip-off, but some fantastically flailing fight scenes almost lift this otherwise humdrum action romp' but praised Del La Rossa's 'smartly animalistic performance' and its finale for being 'the right kind of basic'

In-Review-Online stated: 'No offense to Mission: Impossible or Ballerina or whatever other bajillion-dollar project Hollywood wants to pump out, but Diablo has already claimed the title of action film of the year. This is the pure, uncut stuff'.

GAZETTELY said 'Adkins portrays Kris Chaney not as an indestructible force, but as a man whose mileage is starting to show. After a fight, you see the exhaustion set in; his power is undeniable, but it comes at a cost, reflecting a welcome maturity in the action hero archetype' and that 'Alana De La Rossa's Elisa is a revelation. She fiercely rejects the role of a passive victim, meeting her kidnapper with defiance and a few well-aimed kicks of her own. Her journey from resistance to understanding forms the film's emotional bedrock'.

Ain't It Cool News stated that 'Diablo delivers on every front. The fight scenes, choreographed by Zaror, are intense and deftly photographed. The gunplay is intense, the acting top tier, and the film never lags'.

IGN opined that 'There's something awesome about how the personal stakes (which only grow more personal as Diablo goes on) of the story, free Adkins to modulate his action-man brawniness for something slightly more restrained and mature' and 'it gives him a chance to display the many dimensions of his onscreen prowess, revealing hints of regret, guilt, and even more subtly, the wear and tear of age. Adkins still piles up KO after KO in Diablo, but after years of cutting through bad guys like a finely honed blade, it’s nice to see him portray the rust that's built up under the sheath'.

Go-See-Talk gave it a 3.5/4 rating and said 'if you want white-knuckle excitement, we’re gonna highly recommend Diablo as one of the best films of the year. It sure is tops in our book' and 'Whether seen as a genre film or not, Diablo is just an incredible picture. It’s trope heavy, but it’s also lean, mean, brutal and sure to please anyone who likes hearing bones crunch. Moreover, it honestly made me feel like a kid again watching the greatest Jean-Claude Van Damme movie that never was. The narrative structure is a wonderful hybrid of The Terminator, Logan, and Predator'.

Hollywoodmatrimony said 'I have been eager to see this flick and it gave me everything I had hoped for' and 'Adkins does a great job with his everyman persona here. There is a lot more depth to the character than I expected for this film and it makes it work more leaning into some of the revelations and action'

CINAPSE said 'Diablo thrives on finding ways to make itself stand out with solid essential bones and successful theatrical flare harkening back to the earliest days of cinema'.

Eastern Film Fans said 'Believe the hype, Action and Martial Arts fans rejoice, we have a bona fide cult classic in the making' and 'Diablo is, so far, our action film of the year, it's bold, brash and beautifully orchestrated to provide action film fans with all the entertainment they need'.

Outlaw Vern called it 'An entertaining movie from top to bottom'.

Collider called it 'The perfect guilty pleasure'.

Esquire listed Diablo in their '26 Best Action Movies of 2025', featuring it alongside Sinners, One Battle After Another and Ballerina.

The New York Times recommended it as one of their top five action movies to stream.
