= Kiltro =

- Directed by: Ernesto Díaz Espinoza
- Written by: Ernesto Díaz Espinoza
- Produced by: Derek Rundell
- Cinematography: Victor J. Atkin
- Edited by: Ernesto Díaz Espinoza
- Music by: Rocco
- Release date: 2006
- Running time: 93 minutes
- Country: Chile
- Language: Spanish / Korean

Kiltro is a 2006 Chilean martial arts film written and directed by Ernesto Díaz Espinoza and starring the martial artist Marko Zaror.

== Name ==
The word Kiltro is a stylized spelling of the word quiltro, used in Chile and Bolivia to designate a mixed-breed dog.

== Plot ==
Zamir, a street tough, has been in love with Kim ever since he saved her from rapists. However, the only way he knows how to express his affection is by attacking any man who shows interest in her. Although Kim tolerates Zamir's infatuation, she keeps him at a distance. When Max Kalba arrives in town seeking revenge against Kim's father, Zamir tries to rescue her once again. Unfortunately, Kalba overpowers Zamir and kidnaps Kim's father, who is the Master at the Korean martial arts school.

Kim and Zamir flee and take refuge with a mystical dwarf named Nik Nak, who explains that Kalba plans to kill everyone linked to the "Sect" of martial artists to which Kim and Zamir's fathers belonged. Through a series of flashbacks, a love triangle between Kim's parents and Kalba is revealed, resulting in her mother's suicide.

While Zamir trains with a drunken Sect member named Jose Soto, Kalba's minions kidnap Kim. Zamir learns to fight in the "Zeta" style and is given a pair of bladed spurs for his feet. He arrives at Kalba's headquarters and quickly dispatches Kalba's minions before fighting Kalba himself. During the fight, Kalba reveals that he murdered Zamir's mother, which infuriates Zamir and gives him the strength to defeat Kalba.

Afterward, Zamir checks on Kim, and she thanks him with a second kiss. Zamir then leaves to reunite with José Soto, whom he has just learned is his father.

== Cast ==
- Marko Zaror as Zamir
- Caterina Jadresic as Kim
- Miguel Angel De Luca as Max Kalba
- Daniela Lhorente as Romina
- Luis Alarcón as Farah
- Alejandro Castillo as José Soto
- Man Soo Yoon as Teran
- Roberto Avendaño as "Nik Nak"
- Ximena Rivas as Sara
- Alex Rivera as Alex

== Film references ==
The film contains a number of references to aspects of popular films and television shows. Baylor University film scholar Moises Park lists a partial list of references . Among them: In the scene where Zamir runs down a street at night to the music of David Bowie's "Modern Love" is a parody of a scene in Leos Carax's Bad Blood. The film's score is a pastiche of Ennio Morricone's Spaghetti Western scores, and one passage is taken directly from the score of Once Upon a Time in the West. The scene in which Zamir must attempt to snatch a pebble from his master's hand is a reference to the famous test in the television series Kung Fu. The name of the dwarf Nik Nak is a reference to the dwarf villain Nick Nack in The Man with the Golden Gun. The torture victim suspended by hooks and the main character's bladed shoes are both elements of the film Ichi the Killer.

== See also ==
- Cinema of Chile
