= La sexóloga =

- Genre: Telenovela, Comedy
- Directed by: Vicente Sabatini
- Starring: Isidora Urrejola; Tiago Correa; Claudia Di Girólamo; Héctor Noguera; Liliana Ross; Álvaro Morales; Begoña Basauri
- Opening theme: Touch and Go by DJ Méndez featuring Romina Martin
- Country of origin: Chile
- Original language: Spanish

Production
- Producers: Verónica Basso; Verónica Brañes

Original release
- Network: Chilevisión
- Release: September 24, 2012 – March 7, 2013

Related
- La Doña; Graduados

La Sexóloga (English: The Sexologist) is a Chilean telenovela that originally aired on Chilevisión in Chile on September 24, 2012.

== Cast ==
=== Main cast ===
- Claudia Di Girólamo as Olivia Pamplona
- Tiago Correa as Francisco "Pancho" Pamplona
- Isidora Urrejola as Florencia Garay
- Álvaro Morales as Gabriel Hidalgo
- Begoña Basauri as Griselda Garay
- Héctor Noguera as Hernan "Nano" Hidalgo

=== Supporting cast ===
- Liliana Ross as Mabel Pamplona
- Roberto Vander as Axel Cooper
- Juan Falcón as Eloy Garay
- Bárbara Ruiz-Tagle as Romina Carvajal
- Catalina Pulido as Monica Cooper
- Ricardo Fernández as Esteban Encina
- Cristián Carvajal as German Riveros / Britney Paola
- Sofía García as Julieta Tamayo
- Felipe Contreras as Roberto Loyola "Robert Roberto"
- Malucha Pinto as Yolanda Tapia
- Willy Semler as Custodio Curilen
- Andrea Velasco as Cote Castillo
- Ariel Levy as Adamo Curilen
- Javiera Hernández as Bernardita Nuñez
- Eduardo Paxeco as Nicolay Curilén
- Mayte Rodríguez as Mariana Cooper "Sister Mariana"
- Antonio Campos as Lorenzo Nuñez
- Marcela del Valle as Dayana Cruz
- Juan Pablo Ogalde as DJ Kiss
- Francisca Castillo as Gloria Stevez
- Claudio Castellón as Wenceslao Carvajal

=== Special participations ===
- Diego Ruiz as Luis Miguel Garcia
- Schlomit Baytelman as Simona Rosino
- Alejandro Castillo as Doctor
- Osvaldo Silva as Julio Cesar Galvez
- Alejandra Herrera as Estefania "the Boa"
- Francisco Medina as Eduardo Encina
- Soledad Pérez as Soila
- Andreina Chataing as Vania
- Rodrigo Soto as Doctor Avendaño
- Ernesto Gutiérrez as Señor Patiño
- Ingrid Parra as Fernanda Bascuñan
- Aldo Parodi as Samuel
- Eyal Meyer as the membership of the committee
- Silvia Novak as Roberto's casual partner
- Luz María Yacometti as the judge it home as Gabriel and Griselda
- Catalina Vera as Radio Announcer

== Soundtrack of La sexóloga ==
- The Ting Tings - Great DJ (First main song)
- DJ Méndez - Constamente Mia (Second main song)
- Laura Pausini - Jamas Abandone (Song of Olivia)
- Vicentico - Algo Contigo (Song of Gabriel and Florencia))

== International broadcasters of La sexóloga ==
=== South América ===
- Argentina: Canal 9 (Premiere of La sexóloga on Canal 9 are broadcast from March 10, 2015 at 00:30 (local time)).
- Paraguay: Canal 13 (Premiere of La sexóloga on Canal 13 are broadcast from March 3, 2015 at 22:00 (local time)).
- Ecuador: Teleamazonas
