= Redeemer (2014 film) =

- Directed by: Ernesto Díaz Espinoza
- Written by: Ernesto Díaz Espinoza; Guillermo Prieto; Sanz Andrea; Gina Aguad
- Produced by: Guillermo Prieto; Noah Segan; Marko Zaror
- Starring: Marko Zaror; Noah Segan
- Cinematography: Nicolás Ibieta
- Edited by: Ernesto Díaz Espinoza
- Music by: Claudio Rocco
- Production company: XYZ Films
- Release date: September 2014 (Fantastic Fest)
- Running time: 90 minutes
- Country: Chile
- Language: Spanish

Redeemer is a 2014 Chilean martial arts vigilante action film directed by Ernesto Díaz Espinoza and co-written with Guillermo Prieto, Sanz Andrea and Gina Aguad. The film stars Marko Zaror and Noah Segan. Zaror plays a former hit man who seeks redemption through killing the drug gangs he once served. It premiered in September 2014 at Fantastic Fest.

== Plot ==
Former hit man Nicky Pardo regularly plays Russian roulette with a stylized pistol. Flashbacks reveal that, during a confrontation, he accidentally killed the son of a rival hit man known as the Scorpion. In revenge, the Scorpion tortures both Pardo and his pregnant wife, forces Pardo to kill his wife to end her suffering, and leaves Pardo for dead in a desert. The Scorpion leaves behind his stylized pistol as a way to escape dehydration. Pardo pulls the trigger three times but survives. In the present, he targets the former drug gangs that he once served, giving them an ultimatum to either repent or die. As a result, he becomes known as the Redeemer. When the Scorpion discovered Pardo is still alive, he chases after him.

Pardo comes upon a villager, Agustin, menaced by thugs. After killing his attackers, they hide from the gang's retaliation in the house of Agustin's friend Antonia. Agustin explains that he found a bag full of money and took it to a local church to donate. Pardo offers to trade the money back to the gang in return if they leave the town. Though they refuse to leave, they agree to bargain once the money is recovered. When they realize that Pardo is the Redeemer, they keep him under heavy guard while several men fetch the money. They fail to find the money, and Pardo kills all the men in the room before they can shoot him. The gang's boss, an American named Steve Bradock, dismisses his henchmen's fears and orders them to kill Pardo.

Pardo returns to find that Agustin has given the money to Antonia to help her son get an operation. Pardo initially refuses to allow her to keep it, but he relents after she unknowingly reminds him of slaughtered family. Agustin and Antonia watch as Pardo engages in his ritualistic Russian roulette, and Antonia tells him that he must accept his dark side and forgive himself rather than looking to God for a sign that he has been forgiven. Knowing that the entire gang must be killed if they allow Antonia to keep the money, Pardo researches the gang's next drug deal, where he defeats one of Bradock's assassins.

Meanwhile, the Scorpion arrives in town and kills anyone who gets in his way. Realizing that both the Redeemer and Scorpion are in town, Bradock's second-in-command urges him to flee. Instead, Bradock kills him, promotes underling Piedra, and demands that his men come up with a cool-sounding nickname for him, too. After Pardo clears out a warehouse, Piedra and Pardo engage in a duel. After Pardo wins, he learns from Piedra the location Bradock's headquarters. There, Pardo realizes the Scorpion has already killed Bradock. The Scorpion knocks him out.

When Pardo awakes, he sees that Agustin and Antonia are both prisoners. The Scorpion reveals that he has been killing all the people that Pardo has helped, which he says proves the futility of Pardo's redemption. The Scorpion demands Agustin to play Russian roulette; when he refuses, the Scorpion wounds Antonia and finally kills Agustin. The Scorpion demands Antonia play under threat of Pardo's death, but Pardo points out that the Scorpion would never kill him without making him suffer. Both Antonia and the Scorpion are disarmed, and the two men face off. Pardo defeats the Scorpion, and Antonia hands him the stylized pistol. Instead of killing him, Pardo apologizes for killing his son and gives the Scorpion back his pistol, saying that it is all he can do to reunite the Scorpion with his son. A gunshot is heard as Pardo and Antonia leave.

== Cast ==
- Marko Zaror as Nicky Pardo
- Loreto Aravena as Antonia
- Jose Luis Mosca as "The Scorpion"
- Mauricio Diocares as Agustin
- Noah Segan as Steve Bradock
- Smirnow Boris as Piedra

== Production ==
On March 18, 2014, XYZ Films announced Redeemer, which Marko Zaror would star in and Ernesto Diaz Espinoza direct. On March 26, Noah Segan joined the cast of the film.

The filming began on March 24, 2014, in Pichidangui, Chile, and ended in mid-May.

== Release ==
Redeemer premiered in September 2014 at Fantastic Fest. It received a limited release in the US on 12 June 2015.

== Reception ==
Frank Scheck of The Hollywood Reporter called the action scenes "thrilling to watch" and singled out Zaror's performance as a breakout role. Ethan Alter of Film Journal International wrote that Redeemer updates vigilante films to adapt to popular superhero film tropes but lacks a timely statement to interest viewers. Martin Tsai of the Los Angeles Times called it lame and derivative action film with contrived scenes that force the characters to resort to martial arts. Simon Abrams of The Village Voice wrote, "Redeemer may not be as good as its star, but it does give Zaror enough room to shine."
