= Mirageman =

- Theatrical release poster
- Directed by: Ernesto Díaz Espinoza
- Written by: Ernesto Díaz Espinoza
- Produced by: Derek Rundell; Marko Zaror
- Starring: Marko Zaror; María Elena Swett
- Cinematography: Nicolás Ibieta
- Edited by: Constanza Meza-Lopehandía
- Music by: Rocco
- Production company: Mandrill Films
- Release dates: July 15, 2007 (Fantasia); March 20, 2008 (Chile)
- Running time: 90 minutes
- Country: Chile
- Language: Spanish
- Budget: $500,000
- Box office: $390,003

Mirageman is a 2007 Chilean superhero film written and directed by Ernesto Díaz Espinoza. Starring Marko Zaror and María Elena Swett. It competed for the AMD Next Wave Award for Best Feature and won the bronze medal and Audience Award at the 3rd Fantastic Fest.

== Synopsis ==
A young man tormented by a family tragedy wants to support his brother who is admitted to a health center. Helping the underdog, dressed as a comic book superhero, he will fight crime and make his brother react by admiring this new street hero.

== Cast ==
The actors participating in this film are:

- Marko Zaror as Maco Gutierrez / Mirageman
- María Elena Swett as Carol Valdiviezo
- Ariel Mateluna as Tito Gutierrez
- Mauricio Pesutic as Juan Moli
- Iván Jara as Pseudo-Robin
- Jack Arama as Dr. Sartori
- Gina Aguad as Newscaster
- Eduardo Castro as Rony Lozano
- Pablo Díaz as Topless Bar Client
- Francisco Castro as Villain Capoeira
- Juan Pablo Miranda as Burglar
- Gabriela Sobarzo as Nurse Juanita
- Arturo Ruiz-Tagle as Head of The Pedophilia Network
- Paula Leoncini as Mugged Woman
- Juan Pablo Aliaga as Kidnapped Girl's Father
- Sofia Salas as Nurse Sofia
- Wernher Schurmann as Masked Villain
- Salvador Allende as Thug 11
- Víctor González as Vegueta
- Alfredo Tello as Thug 4
- Jorge Lillo as Announcer (voice)
- Lucky Buzzio as Pickpocket 4
- Constanza Meza-Lopehandia as Interviewed 1
- Nicolás Ibieta as Masks Seller

== Release ==
Mirageman had its world premiere on July 15, 2007, at the 11th Fantasia International Film Festival, then screened on September 21, 2007, at the 3rd Fantastic Fest. It was commercially released on March 20, 2008, in Chilean theaters.

== Reception ==
=== Box-office ===
In its 11 weeks in theaters, Mirageman attracted 80,836 viewers, grossing $189,393,091 Chilean pesos, becoming the fifth highest-grossing national film of that year.

=== Accolades ===
Year	Award / Festival	Category	Recipient	Result	Ref.
2007	Fantastic Fest	Best Feature - Bronze Medal	Mirageman	Won	
2007	Fantastic Fest	Audience Award	Mirageman	Won	
2007	Valdivia International Film Festival	Best Chilean Feature Film - Audience Award	Mirageman	Won	
2008	Puchon International Fantastic Film Festival	Best of Puchon	Mirageman	Nominated	
2008	Rio de Janeiro Fantastic Film Festival	Audience Award	Mirageman	Won	
2009	Pedro Sienna Awards	Best Picture	Mirageman	Nominated	
2009	Pedro Sienna Awards	Best Supporting Actor	Iván Jara	Nominated	
