= You Can't Run Forever =

- Theatrical release poster
- Directed by: Michelle Schumacher
- Written by: Carolyn Carpenter; Michelle Schumacher
- Produced by: Randle Schumacher
- Starring: J. K. Simmons; Allen Leech; Fernanda Urrejola; Isabelle Anaya; Olivia Simmons; Max Garfin; Nathan Vincenti
- Cinematography: Pietro Villani
- Edited by: Evan Ahlgren
- Music by: Joe Simmons
- Production companies: Rubber Tree Productions; Voltage Pictures
- Distributed by: Lionsgate
- Release date: May 17, 2024
- Running time: 102 minutes
- Country: United States
- Language: English

You Can't Run Forever (formerly titled The Woods) is a 2024 American thriller film written by Carolyn Carpenter and Michelle Schumacher, directed by Schumacher and starring J. K. Simmons.

The film was released in the United States on May 17, 2024.

== Plot summary ==
Ed and Jenny Cooper are expecting a baby. They live with Miranda, Jenny’s daughter, and Ed's daughter Emily from a previous marriage. Miranda has anxiety and panic attacks and is on medication. Ed and Miranda leave to buy a bassinet for the baby.

On the way, they stop at a gas station and Ed and Miranda encounter serial killer Wade, who has been killing people indiscriminately. He shoots Ed as Miranda flees into the woods. The police track Wade.

Wade pursues a panic attacked Miranda in the woods using Ed's phone to taunt and track her and Jenny. Miranda encounters a family but Wade shoots all three of them. Emily joins volunteers to find Miranda.

Miranda meets Todd, the teenage son of the family she met before, who is suffering from a gunshot wound. Miranda tells Todd she found her father’s body after he committed suicide and that caused her mental illness. Todd dies of his gunshot wounds overnight. Wade is revealed as a disgruntled college professor on a killing rampage. Miranda arrives to the nearby ranger station and reunites with Emily.

Wade decides to go to Ed and Jenny’s home. He holds Jenny hostage and calls Emily and tells her and Miranda come. After a struggle, Jenny shoots Wade and later has her baby. Jenny, Miranda, and Emily’s bond had grown stronger than ever before.

== Cast ==
- J. K. Simmons as Wade
- Allen Leech as Eddie
- Fernanda Urrejola as Jenny
- Isabelle Anaya as Miranda
- Olivia Simmons as Emily
- Max Garfin as Ben
- Nathan Vincenti as Davis
- Kevin Quinn as Todd

== Production ==
In September 2021, it was announced that Simmons, Leech, Urrejola, and Anaya had been cast in the film. It was also reported that same month that filming had occurred in Missoula, Montana.

In January 2023, filming wrapped.

Simmons confirmed in an interview with MovieWeb that the making of the film was a family collaboration since his wife co-wrote and directed the film, his brother-in-law produced it, his son composed the score of the film and his daughter makes an appearance in the film.

== Release ==
You Can't Run Forever was released in the United States on May 17, 2024.

== Reception ==
On the review aggregator website Rotten Tomatoes, 27% of 15 critics' reviews are positive, with an average rating of 4.2/10. Brian Tallerico of RogerEbert.com awarded the film one and a half stars. Will Sayre of MovieWeb rated the film a 3 out of 5.
