= Liliana Ross =

Italian-Chilean actress

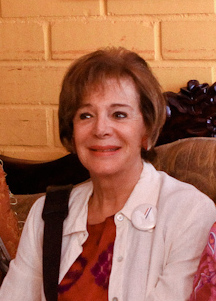
- Liliana Ross in 2013
- Born: Liliana Piera Marina Brescia Clerici; March 30, 1939; Genoa, Italy
- Died: June 10, 2018 (aged 79); Santiago, Chile
- Education: Pontifical Catholic University of Chile
- Occupations: Actress, director, playwright, producer
- Years active: 1965–2017
- Spouse(s): Hugo Miller (1963–1997; his death); Raoul Pinno (2003–2018; her death)
- Children: Daniela Miller; Vanessa Miller; Moira Miller

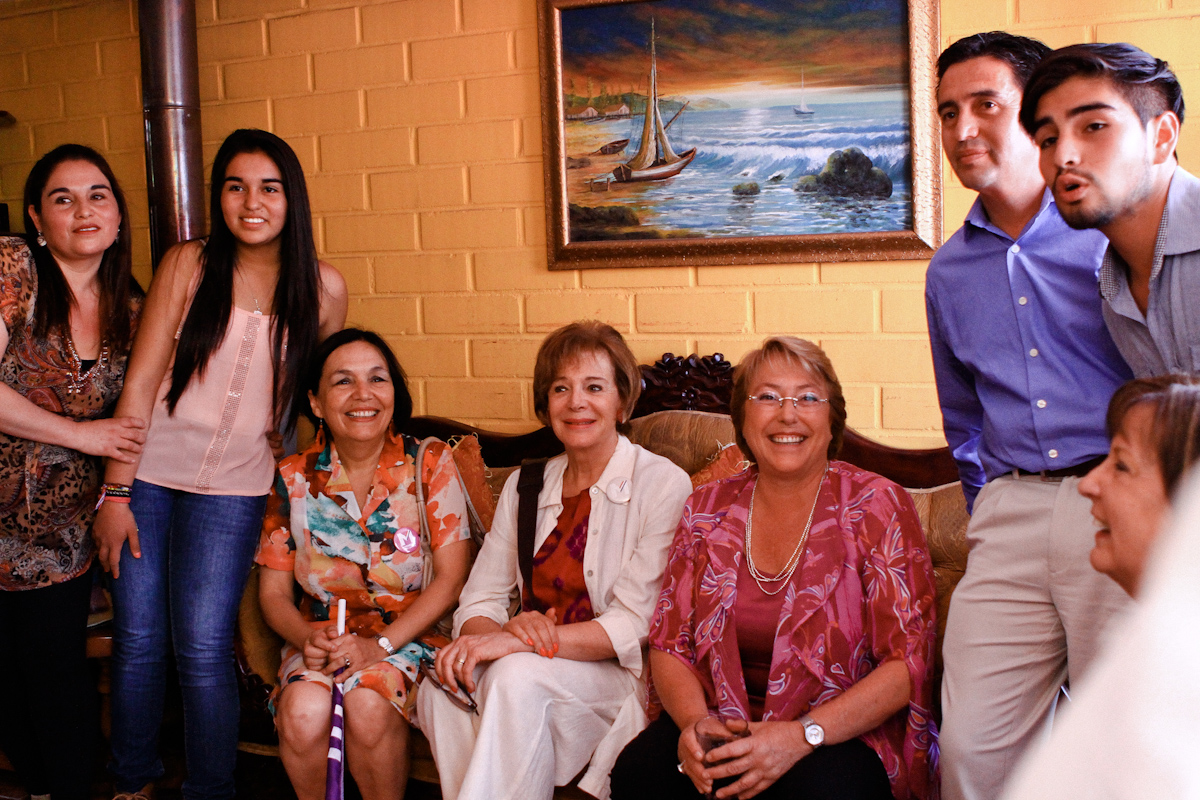
Liliana Ross (center wearing while) seated with then-presidential candidate Michelle Bachelet in 2013

Liliana Piera Marina Brescia Clerici, best known professionally as Liliana Ross, (March 30, 1939 – June 10, 2018) was an Italian-born Chilean actress, director, playwright, and theatrical producer whose professional career spanned more than fifty years. She was best known to television audiences for her starring roles in the Chilean telenovelas La Colorina (1977) and Machos (2003).

In 1992, Ross was honored with the title Knight of the Order of Merit of the Italian Republic by the Italian government.

== Biography ==
=== Early life ===
Ross was born Liliana Piera Marina Brescia Clerici in Genoa, Italy. She was raised in Pegli, a neighborhood in Genoa. Her first language was Italian. She emigrated to Chile with her parents when she was six-years old to escape World War II. She later recalled witnessing bombs falling on an Italian beach as her father ordered her to hide under a boat.

=== Career ===
In Chile, Ross appeared in more than twenty telenovelas and television dramas on four major networks – Canal 13, Televisión Nacional de Chile (TVN), Mega, and Chilevisión (CHV). In 1977, Ross was cast in the lead role on TVN telenovela, La Colorina, which aired for 88 episodes and launched her professional career.

Ross became best known to domestic and international television audiences for her starring role in the 2003 Canal 13 telenovela series, Machos. Ross portrayed Valentina Fernández, the matriarch of the Mercader family and mother of the seven Mercader brothers – Álex (Jorge Zabaleta), Ariel (Felipe Braun), Alonso (Cristián Campos), Antonio (Pablo Díaz), Adán (Gonzalo Valenzuela), Amaro (Diego Muñoz), and Armando (Rodrigo Bastidas). In contrast to her role on the show, Ross had three daughters and no sons in real life. In one of the show's most memorable scenes, Ross' character died surrounded by her on-screen husband, played by Héctor Noguera, and their sons. The episode, considered a landmark in Chilean television history, was watched by an entire generation of Chilean viewers.

Ross' last television credit was the 2012 telenovela series, La Sexóloga. In a July 2014 interview with Radio Cooperativa to promote her new comedic radio series, Sexitosas, Ross remarked that she would have loved to continue working in television, but she was no longer being offered roles in that particular medium. She told Radio Cooperativa at the time, "I've asked for a job, but I have no idea why they have stopped calling me." However, she continued to appear in several Chilean films throughout the 2010s, including Qué pena tu boda in 2011, Qué pena tu familia in 2012, and Mamá ya crecí in 2014.

Aside from television, much of Ross' work centered on the theater as an actor, director and producer. For example, Ross directed a 2000 Chilean stage adaptation of The Full Monty, which starred Gonzalo Valenzuela.

=== Honors and other work ===
In 2001, Ross teamed with her daughter, Daniela Miller, and photographer Pia Cosmelli to open a photography studio in Santiago called De Cuerpo y Alma (Body and Soul), which offered nude photography sessions to ordinary people. The premise of the project, which accepted clients of all shapes and sizes, was that "there are no ugly bodies," according to Ross.

Ross was honored by both the Chilean and Italian governments, as well as several publications, for her contributions to the arts. In 2003, the magazine Cara named honored Ross as its woman of the year. The Asociación de Periodistas de Espectáculos, Arte y Cultura de Chile awarded Ross, and nine other prominent actresses, with the Premio APES award in 2011.

Notably, the Italian government named Ross to the Order of Merit of the Italian Republic in 1992.

=== Later life ===
Ross began to suffer from cognitive difficulties in 2016 and 2017, which led to her retirement from acting. She was later diagnosed with Alzheimer's disease, though both she and her family kept the diagnosis a private matter.

Liliana Ross died at her home in Santiago, Chile, on June 10, 2018, at the age of 79. Her funeral was held at the Inmaculada Concepción de Vitacura.

== Personal life ==
Ross met her first husband, director Hugo Miller, while both were students at Pontifical Catholic University of Chile. The couple in 1963 had three daughters – Daniela, Vanessa and Moira. Like Ross, two of her daughters, Vanessa Miller and Moira Miller, became professional actresses. Hugo Miller died in 1997.

In 2003, married her second husband, theater producer Raoul Pinno. They remained together until her death in 2018.

== Filmography ==
=== Films ===
Films
Year	Film title	Character	Director
1970	El libro de Jacob	Ornella	Orlin Corey
1975	La pérgola de las flores	Cantante	
1998	Gringuito	Teresa "Teté"	Sergio Castilla
1999	Last Call	Rosemary Kendall	Christine Lucas
2003	Cesante	Old cuica	Ricardo Amunátegui
2004	Mujeres infieles	Teresa Vial	Rodrigo Ortúzar
2005	La fiesta del 35	Helga	Jorge Fried
2006	Rojo intenso	Madre de Laura	Javier Elorrieta
2011	Qué pena tu boda	Anavelia Smith	Nicolás López
2012	Qué pena tu familia	Anavelia Smith	Nicolás López
2014	Mamá ya crecí	Amelia Flores	Sebastián Badilla y Gonzalo Badilla
2016	Viejos amores	Ella misma	Gloria Laso

=== Telenovelas ===
Telenovelas
Year	Series	Title	Television channel
1976	Sol tardío		TVN
1977	La Colorina	Luciana Álvarez "La Colorina"	TVN
1983	Las herederas	Fernanda	Canal 13
1983	Bianca Vidal	Sofía Rinaldi	Televisa
1984	La represa	Soledad / Teresa Fuenzalida	TVN
1984	La torre 10	Loreto Mena	TVN
1987	La última cruz	Antonia Zazar	Canal 13
1989	La intrusa	Blanca Tropero	Canal 13
1990	Acércate más	Raquel Olivares	Canal 13
1991	Ellas por ellas	Marta	Canal 13
1992	Fácil de amar	Yasna	Canal 13
1994	Champaña	Eleonora Camargo	Canal 13
1994	Top Secret	Sonia Díaz	Canal 13
1995	Amor a domicilio	Silvia Risopatrón	Canal 13
1996	Adrenalina	Elvira Jordán	Canal 13
1997	Rossabella	Gina Mora	Mega
1998	A todo dar	Yasna Fuentes	Mega
1999	Algo está cambiando	Gloria Risopatrón	Mega
2001	Piel canela	Gracia Lobos	Canal 13
2003	Machos	Valentina Fernández	Canal 13
2004	Tentación	Sofía Stewart	Canal 13
2006	Cómplices	Martita Fuenzalida	TVN
2006	Disparejas	Elena Catalán	TVN
2007	Corazón de María	Leonor Bustamante	TVN
2011	Maldita	Antonia Rosetti	Mega
2012	Amor bravío	Ágatha Acosta	Televisa
2012	La Sexóloga	Mabel Pamplona	Chilevisión

=== Other television series and sitcoms ===
Television series
Year	Series title	Character	Channel
1979	Martín Rivas	Doña Engracia	TVN
1982	Una familia feliz	Ana Altamira	Canal 13
2003	Cuentos de mujeres	Irma / Olaya	TVN
2005	La Nany	Señora Valdivieso	Mega
2011	Karma	Ana María	Chilevisión
