= Bring Me the Head of the Machine Gun Woman =

- Film poster
- Spanish: Tráiganme la cabeza de la mujer metralleta
- Directed by: Ernesto Díaz Espinoza
- Written by: Ernesto Díaz Espinoza; Fernanda Urrejola
- Starring: Fernanda Urrejola; Matías Oviedo; Jorge Alis
- Cinematography: Nicolás Ibieta
- Edited by: Ernesto Díaz Espinoza; Nicolás Ibieta
- Music by: Rocco
- Production companies: LatinXploitation; Ronnoc Entertainment
- Distributed by: Ronnoc Entertainment
- Release date: September 23, 2012 (Austin Fantastic Fest)
- Running time: 73 minutes
- Country: Chile
- Language: Spanish

Bring Me the Head of the Machine Gun Woman (Spanish: Tráiganme la cabeza de la mujer metralleta) is a 2012 Chilean action comedy that was directed by Ernesto Díaz Espinoza. The film had its world premiere on 23 September 2012 at the Fantastic Fest and was released in Chile on 23 May 2013.

== Synopsis ==
Santiago (Matías Oviedo) is a DJ and gamer who stumbles upon gangster Che Longana (Jorge Alis) and his henchmen planning a hit on a notorious bounty hunter known as "Machine Gun Woman" (Fernanda Urrejola). Caught in the act, Santiago offers to kill Machine Gun Woman and bring back her head to prove her demise, approaching the situation as he would in a violent video game.

After successfully finding Machine Gun Woman, Santiago is pursued by Che's underlings who want to kill them both. In the ensuing confrontation, Machine Gun Woman kills the henchmen but shows mercy to Santiago, who attempts to flee the city with his mother (Francisca Castillo). However, Che catches up to them and threatens to harm them if Santiago doesn't deliver Machine Gun Woman to him.

Santiago manages to locate Machine Gun Woman again, but Che tracks them down and shoots one of them during their escape. Despite this setback, the two become romantically involved and plan to take down Che once and for all. However, Santiago forgets to inform Machine Gun Woman that his mother has been captured, leading to a botched operation.

Despite the setback, Santiago and Machine Gun Woman manage to confront Che, and they ultimately succeed in killing him. Afterward, Machine Gun Woman and Santiago share a kiss before she departs, leaving Santiago to try and follow her. Unfortunately, the police stop him before he can catch up to her.

== Cast ==
- Fernanda Urrejola as La Mujer Metralleta (Machine Gun Woman)
- Matías Oviedo as Santiago Fernández
- Jorge Alis as Che Longana
- Sofía García as Shadeline Soto
- Alex Rivera as Flavio
- Felipe Avello as Jonny Medina
- Pato Pimienta as Pato El Conserje
- Francisca Castillo as Santiago's Mom
- Miguel Angel De Luca as Parguineo
- Daniel Antivilo as El Tronador
- Jaime Omeñaca as Bracoli

== Reception ==
Critical reception for Bring Me the Head of the Machine Gun Woman has been mostly positive, and Film School Rejects and Complex both considered the film to be one of the best films at the Austin Fantastic Fest. The Daily Record and The List both gave the movie three stars, and the Daily Record noted that although the film had some flaws with its production it was ultimately "a fun ride that never outstays its welcome." Bloody Disgusting gave the film an overly favorable review, specifically praising actress Fernanda Urrejola's performance.
