= Fernanda Urrejola =

Chilean actress (born 1981)

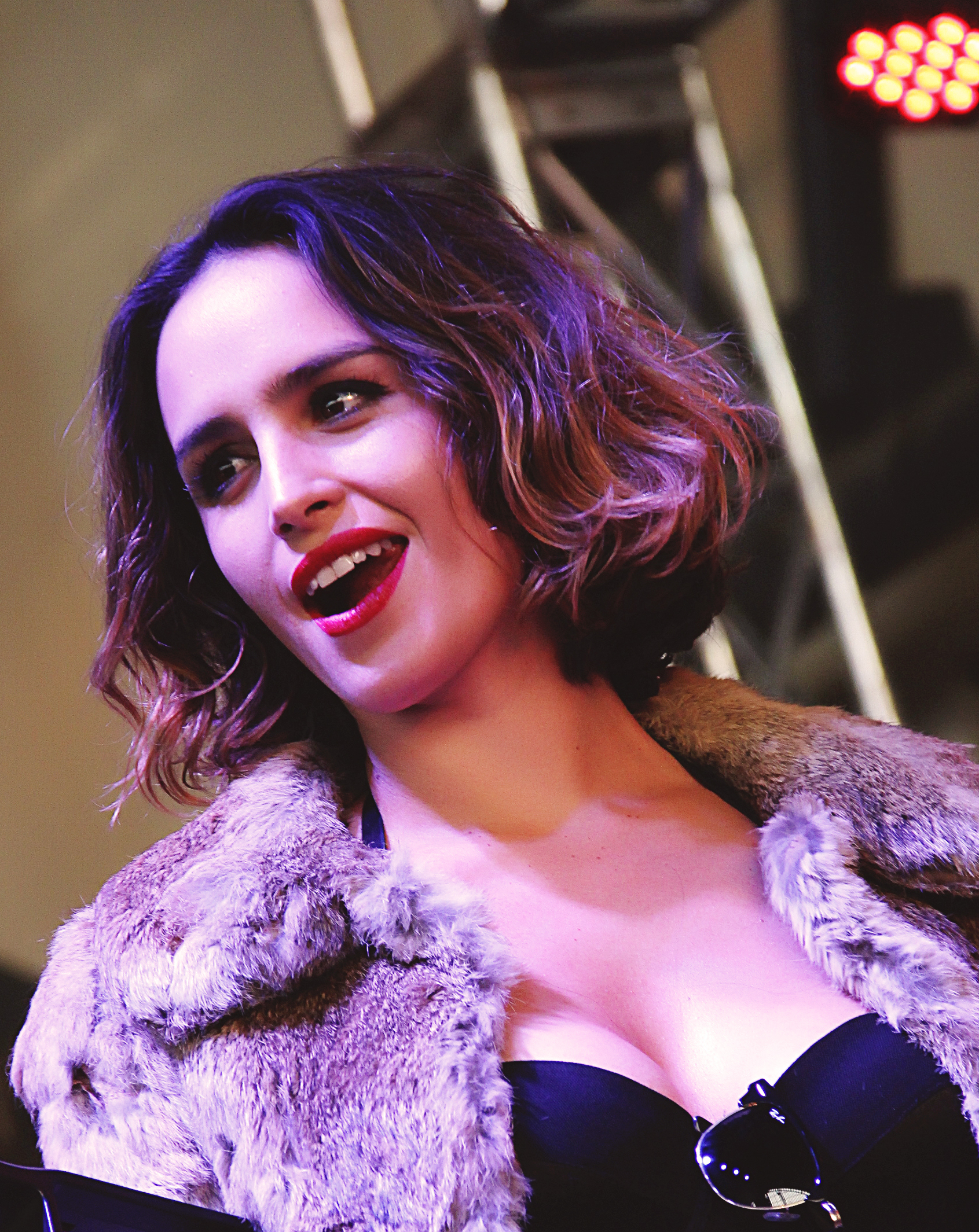
- Fernanda Urrejola in 2013 characterized as Mujer Metralleta.
- Born: Fernanda Loreto Urrejola Arroyo; September 24, 1981 (age 45); Santiago de Chile, Chile
- Occupation: Actor
- Height: 169 cm (5 ft 7 in)

Fernanda Loreto Urrejola Arroyo (born September 24, 1981) is a Chilean television, theatre and film actress.

The daughter of Francisco Urrejola and Francisca Arroyo, she has three sisters, Alejandra, Francisca and Isidora. She studied at the Kent School in Providencia, Santiago and later studied scenic communication in Duoc UC. She started her acting career in the teen telenovela 16.

Urrejola made her film debut in Perjudícame Cariño. She played a popular character in the telenovela Corazón de María as the wife of Néstor Cantillana's character. She also participated in Hijos del Monte. She is bisexual.

Since relocating to Los Angeles, California, in 2016, she has appeared in productions including Narcos: Mexico and Cry Macho, sharing credits with Clint Eastwood. In 2023, she appeared as Dolores De La Cruz on HBO Max's Gossip Girl reboot.

== Swimming career ==
At the age of eight, Urrejola started practicing rhythmic gymnastics before switching to synchronized swimming at professional level, becoming the Chilean champion at the age of 14. She represented Chile in South American championships and at the 1997 FINA World Junior Synchronised Swimming Championships. Her highest ranking was second place in South American championships.

== Filmography ==
=== Film ===
Year	Title	Role
2004	El roto (Perjudícame cariño)	
2004	Bienvenida realidad	Marina
2005	My Best Enemy	Gloria
2010	Drama	Mother of Mateo
2011	Metro cuadrado	Romina
2012	Bring Me the Head of the Machine Gun Woman	La Mujer Metralleta
2014	Gritos del bosque	Ailén Catrilaf
2018	No estoy loca	Maite
2018	American huaso	
2018	Imprisoned	Lisa
2019	After Her	Gabriela
2021	Cry Macho	
2021	Blue Miracle	
2023	The Black Demon	
2024	You Can't Run Forever	

=== TV ===
==== Telenovelas ====
Year	Series	Role	Station
2003	16	Matilde Arias	TVN
2004	Destinos Cruzados	Pascuala Goycolea	TVN
2005	17	Matilde Arias	TVN
2005	Versus	Clarita Chaparro	TVN
2006	Floribella	Sofía Santillán	TVN
2007	Corazón de Maria	María Cofré	TVN
2007	Amor por accidente	Romina Urrutia	TVN
2008	Hijos del Monte	Beatriz Pereira	TVN
2010	Mujeres de Lujo	Magdalena Reyes / Esmeralda Martín	Chilevisión
2011	La Doña	Millaray Lisperguer	Chilevisión
2013	Graduados	María Laura "Loli" Falsetti	Chilevisión
2015	Chipe Libre		Canal 13
2016	20añero a los 40		Canal 13

==== Series ====
Year	Title	Role	Station
2003	La Vida es una lotería	Patty	TVN
2004	Bienvenida Realidad	Marina	TVN
2005	JPT: Justicia para todos	Mónica Ríos	TVN
2008	Gen Mishima	Amapola Benadente	TVN
2010	Adiós la Séptimo de Línea	Leonora Latorre	Megavisión
2011	Karma	Juliet	Chilevisión
2018	Narcos: Mexico	María Elvira	Netflix
2020	Party of Five	Gloria	Freeform
2021	Gossip Girl	Dolores De La Cruz	HBO Max

== Theatre ==
- El Inspector (2005)
- Cuentos para un invierno largo (2006)
- Patio (2009)
