= Coco Legrand =

Chilean comedian, actor and TV presenter (born 1947)

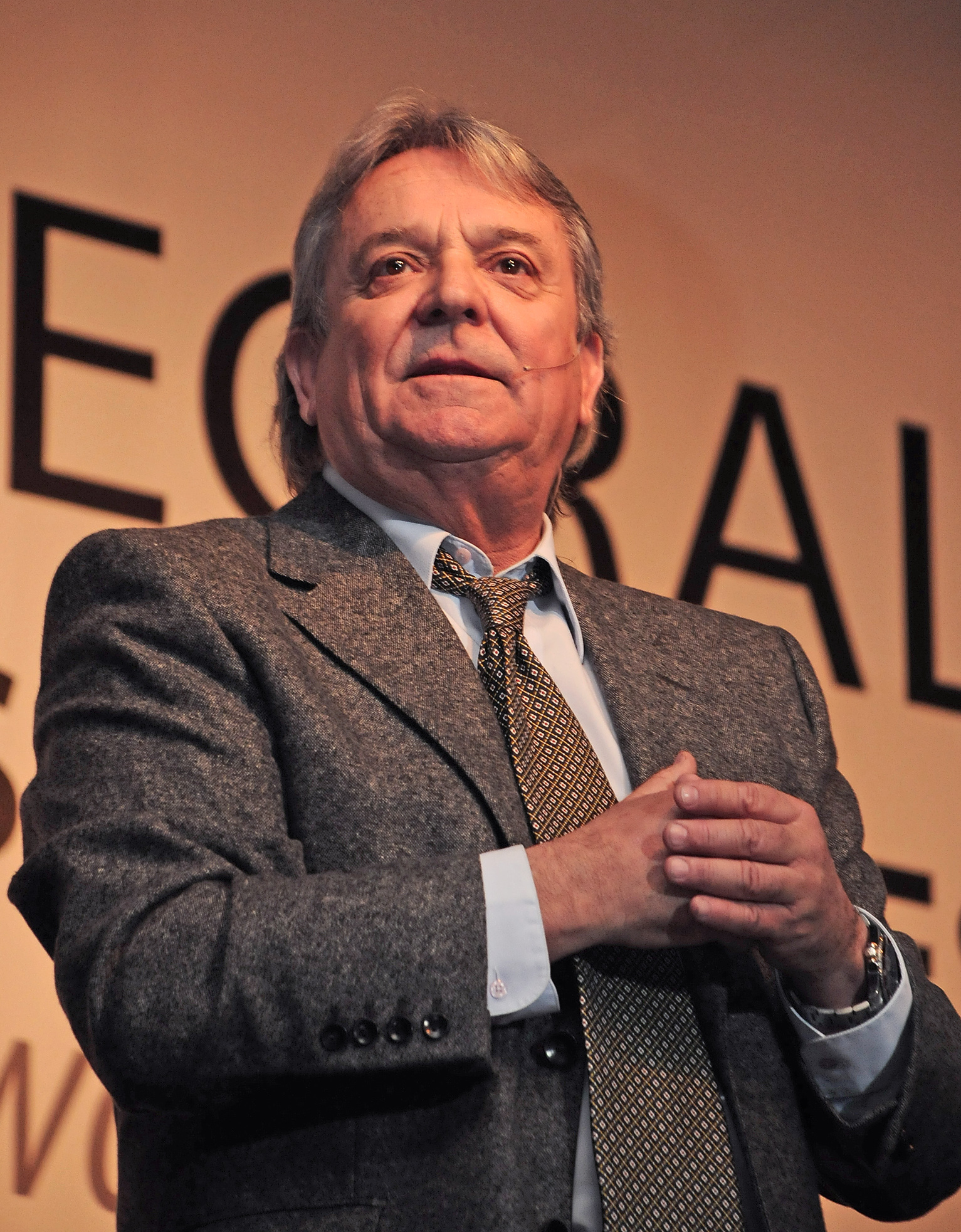
- Legrand in 2010
- Born: Alejandro Javier González Legrand; 28 July 1947 (age 79); Santiago, Chile
- Education: Colegio Hispano Americano; University of Chile; Home Union College
- Occupations: Comedian; actor; TV presenter
- Years active: 1970–2024

Alejandro Javier González Legrand, better known as Coco Legrand (born 28 July 1947), is a Chilean comedian, actor and TV presenter. His repertoire consists mainly of monologues that show daily experiences that allow us to review the most typical psychological features of society, satirizing them and thus rediscovering the profile of the average Chilean citizen.

In coherence with this, the topics addressed in the scripts correspond to family, work and sexual problems, among others of contingency. While he presents various situations, gestures, postures and typical phrases, he denounces attitudes and rescues the dignity of the Chilean people in front of them.

== Early life ==
Legrand was born on 28 July 1947 in Santiago.

He is the son of José González Videla, brother of President Gabriel González Videla, and Raquel Legrand. However, the father of his heart was always Amado Paredes Cárdenas, founder of Metalpar and Viñedos Torreón de Paredes. He was a fundamental pillar to later dedicate himself to humor.

He studied at the Liceo 7 de Ñuñoa and at the Colegio Hispano Americano in downtown Santiago. He wanted to study theater, but finally decided on Design at the Faculty of Fine Arts of the University of Chile. In addition, he studied at Home Union College, in Kosciusko, Mississippi (United States), where he majored in die-cutting. He returned with a degree and worked for a year in the press rooms of the workshops that the French brand Citroën owned in Arica, in the far north of Chile.

== Comedy career ==
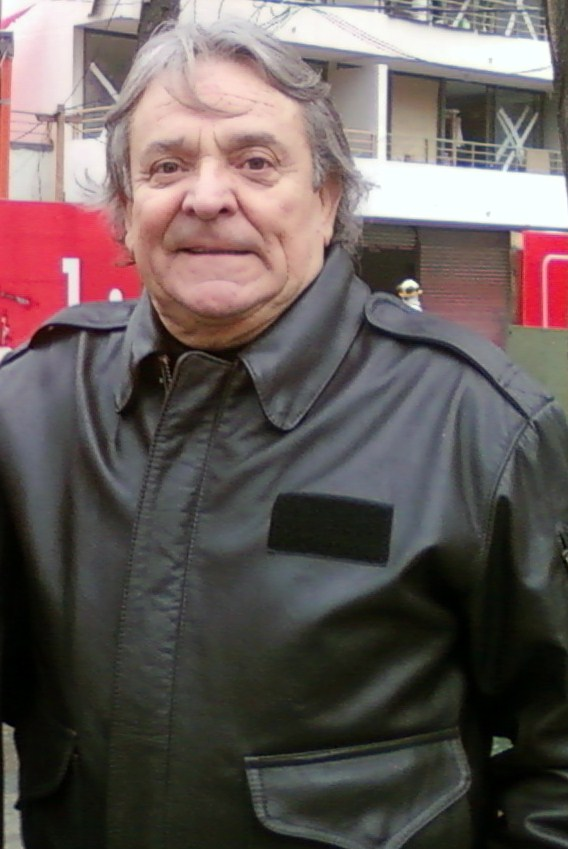
Legrand in 2009

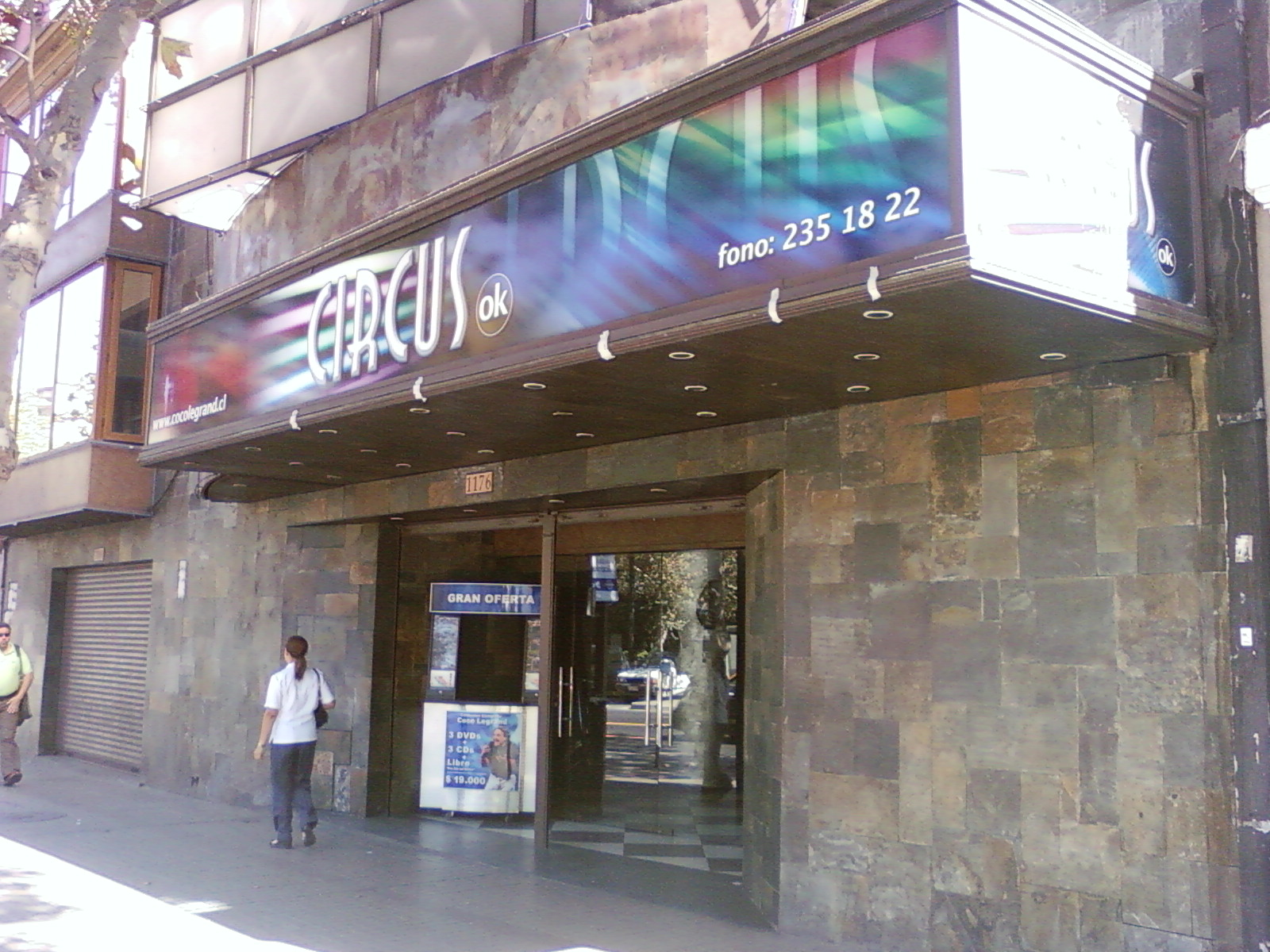
Old Circus Ok Theatre property of Coco Legrand, currently demolished

The comedian began professionally in 1970 in Arica, where he showed his first works and immediately stood out for the quality and variety of his characters that he was introducing in routines that led him to be known, each one with a hint of current affairs in agreement at the time. Then, he received very positive support from the specialized critics and the public, as well as from the journalist Alfredo Lamadrid, who represented him for several years.

Legrand moved to Santiago, where he performed in a variety of entertainment venues in an effort to identify with people of all ages. His monologues, short jokes, "stories" as he calls them, were reportedly liked by diverse audiences.

His presentations at the now defunct Bim bam bum magazine theater in Santiago were memorable, as were his performances on television and radio. The definitive consecration of Coco Legrand came with his remembered presentation at the XIII Viña del Mar International Song Festival, in 1972, with characters such as Lolo Palanca and Cuesco Cabrera.

In 1977, according to a publication in the newspaper El Mercurio of that year, Legrand would have been part of the so-called "77 young people from Chacarillas", attending a ceremony held in that town. The act was an explicit personal tribute to Augusto Pinochet Ugarte, Legrand, however, has denied having attended such a ceremony.

In the 1980s, his strong suit was the café concerts, six in all. Three of his café concerts took them to the phonogram: With the T-shirt on, Don't vote for me and The Decade of a Coco. To them is added the volume A cantar con Coco Legrand.

On 11 February 1980, the last night of that year's Viña del Mar International Song Festival, the artist's presentation was abruptly cut by TVN to make way for Neil Sedaka's performance in time to meet international broadcasting commitments. While the public demanded the comedian's return to the stage, Coco Legrand was held back, amid the struggles, the producers of the station and the journalists who were trying to interview him. That night, Coco Legrand vowed never to step on the stage of the Viña del Mar Festival again.

Between 1980 and 1981 he worked in Argentina, where he shot three comic films, two of them with Alberto Olmedo and Jorge Porcel.

The oath of Viña del Mar was kept for 20 years, until the year 2000. At the XLI International Song Festival, there was a reunion between the humorist and the audience of Quinta Vergara. He also appeared in the 2006 and 2010 editions of the contest, taking the highest awards from the public.

In 2003 and 2004, he hosted the program Ciudad Gótica, on Televisión Nacional de Chile (TVN), along with Felipe Camiroaga and Carla Ballero. In 2008, he also had a star of his own on the same channel, broadcast on Tuesdays at 10 pm, called El día del Coco.

Coco Legrand was the manager and owner of Circus Ok, a theater and entertainment company. His friend, actor Jaime Azócar, was the art director. In 2012, the theater was demolished along with other adjoining buildings to build an apartment building. Coco moved its offices to Av. Apoquindo in Las Condes.

In 2016, he reviewed his career on the program 45 años de un Coco, broadcast on the TVN channel. That same year he performed in the theatrical play Viejos de mierda alongside Tomás Vidiella and Jaime Vadell. The comedy was a great success and remained a stable work until Vidiella's death in early 2021.

One of Coco Legrand's hobbies is Harley Davidson motorcycles, of which he has had several, baptizing them with the names of well-known national women due to some important characteristic. Among them are: Chechi Bolocco, Raquel Argandoña, Fernanda Hansen, Pamela Díaz, Gladys Marín and Faloon Larraguibel.

In the animated film Condorito: La Película, the comedian voiced the characters Doña Tremebunda and Don Cuasimodo.

In 2019, a wax statue with his figure was placed in the comedians' area of the Las Condes Wax Museum.

In November 2020 he launched his own online theater website.

He announced his definitive retirement from the stage on June 19, 2024 just before turning 77 and after health difficulties derived from vertigo.

== Monologues ==
- XXI Festival de Viña del Mar (1980)
- Humor al contado (1981)
- Ríase por la recesión o la fuerza (1982)
- Tú te lamentas, de qué te lamentas (1983-1985)
- Con la camiseta puesta (1986-1987)
- No voten por mí (1988-1989)
- La década de un Coco (1990-1992)
- ¿Qué se teje? (1993-1995)
- ¡Al diablo con todo! (1996-1999)
- XLI Festival de Viña del Mar (2000)
- Hasta aquí nomás llegamos (2002)
- XLVII Festival de Viña del Mar (2006)
- Los Coquitos dicen (alongside with his son Matías González - 2007)
- LI Festival Internacional de la Canción de Viña del Mar (2010)
- Terrícolas, Corruptos Pero Organizados (T-CPO) (2010-2014)
- 70 o sé tonto (2022-2024)

== Filmography ==
=== Films ===
- A los cirujanos se les va la mano (1980)
- Las mujeres son cosa de guapos (1981)
- Abierto día y noche (1981)
- Cesante (2003)
- Héroes (2005)
- Lokas (2008)
- Condorito: La Película (2017)

=== Television ===
- Centralízate, gallo, en la alta tensión (1979)
- Mediomundo (1985)
- De lo bueno... Coco (1990)
- Maravillozoo (1995-2002)
- Por fin es lunes (2002)
- El día del Coco (2008)
- 45 años de un Coco (2016)
