= Duoc UC =

Institution of higher education in Chile

DuocUC
- The DuocUC Professional Institute Foundation Fundación Instituto Profesional DuocUC
- Motto: Cercanía. Liderazgo. Futuro. (Closeness. Leadership. Future.)
- Type: non-profit
- Established: 7 November 1968
- Founder: Pontificia Universidad Católica de Chile
- Affiliations: UNESCO-UNEVOC, Erasmus+, iMech+, WFCP, NASAD, IMIA, NMEDSUP, CORFO, CORMA, CIM UC CORMA
- Rector: Carlos Díaz Vergara
- Academic staff: 3,876 (2015)
- Administrative staff: 2,203 (2015)
- Students: 103,000 (2021)
- Location: Región Metropolitana de Santiago; Región de Valparaiso; Región del Biobío; Región de la Araucanía; Región de los Lagos
- Campus: 20 (2023)
- Website: www.duoc.cl

The Duoc Foundation of the Pontifical Catholic University of Chile—DuocUC (or the University Worker-Peasant Department of the Pontifical Catholic University of Chile) is a Chilean higher technical-professional institution, created on November 16, 1968, organized as a Professional Institute, and constituted as a non-profit, autonomous, ecclesiastical foundation and subsidiary of the Pontifical Catholic University of Chile.

The institution is an accredited in Chile, and provides technical and professional degrees through practical and industry-focused programs.

Nowadays it has 20 campuses, more than 103,000 students and ca. 3,169 teachers. Its rector is Carlos Díaz Vergara.

== History ==
DuocUC was founded in 1968 under the name "University Worker-Peasant Department of the Pontifical Catholic University of Chile" (Departamento Universitario Obrero Campesino de la Pontificia Universidad Católica de Chile) to give free education to students from lower social backgrounds, children of workers and farmers in particular. This practice was already being conducted by the University of Chile and especially the State Technical University (UTE), which was immersed in the era of university reform university classrooms opened to workers and low-income students who could study technical courses at universities despite economic shortcomings.

Duoc grew rapidly and a year after its foundation it already had one campus and 475 students. The following year, the campuses tripled, and the number of students grew to 3,033. In 1972 DuocUC already had 30,000 students enrolled in its courses and programs. The growth achieved in its early years prompted the Pontifical Catholic University of Chile to give legal autonomy and management, approving the creation of the Duoc Foundation, on 7 September 1973.

== Campus ==
The institution's schools are present in 5 of the 16 Regions of Chile (2023).

The patrimonial and university extension building of Santiago can also be seen virtually.

Region	Campus
Santiago Metropolitan Region	Campus Alameda
	Campus Antonio Varas
Campus Educación Continua
Campus Maipú
Campus Melipilla
Campus Padre Alonso de Ovalle
Campus Plaza Norte
Campus Plaza Oeste
Campus Plaza Vespucio
Campus Puente Alto
Campus San Bernardo
Campus San Carlos de Apoquindo
Campus San Joaquín
Valparaíso Region	Campus Valparaíso
	Campus Viña del Mar
Biobío Region	Campus San Andrés de Concepción
	Campus Arauco
Campus Nacimiento
Araucanía Region	Campus Villarrica
Los Lagos Region	Campus Puerto Montt

== Schools and programs ==
Currently, DuocUC has 9 schools distributed over 20 campuses (2023) where Professional and Technical level careers are taught:

1. School of Administration and Business
2. School of Communication
3. School of Construction
4. School of Design
5. School of Gastronomy
6. School of Informatics and Telecommunications
7. School of Engineering and Natural Resources
8. School of Health
9. School of Tourism and Hospitality

School	Professional Career	Technical Career
School of Business and Administration	Digital Marketing Engineering	Administration Technician
	Logistics Management Engineering	Logistics Management Technician
	Foreign Trade Engineering	Foreign Trade Technician
	Administration Engineering, mention in People Management	People Management Technician
	Administration Engineering, mention in Finance	Finance Technician
	Auditing	General Accounting, mention in Tax Legislation
School of Communication	Sound Engineering	Sound Technician
	Audiovisual Communication	Audiovisual Technician
	Advertising	
Public Relations, mention in Marketing
Digital Animation
Acting and Performance
School of Construction	Risk Prevention Engineering	Risk Prevention Technician
	Construction Engineering	Construction Technician
		Electrical Facilities and Projects Technician
Topographer Technician
Restoration of Patrimonial Goods
Architectural and Structural Drawing and Modeling
School of Design	Industrial Design	Illustration
	Graphic Design	Development and Web Design
	Interior Design	
Fashion Design
School of Gastronomy	Administration in International Gastronomy	Gastronomy Technician
School of Computer Science and Telecommunications	Infrastructure and Technological Platforms Engineering	Infrastructure and Technological Platforms Administration
	Informatics Engineering	Computer Analyst-Programmer
	Connectivity and Network Engineering	Network and Telecommunications Administration
School of Engineering and Natural Resources	Automotive Mechanical and Autotronics Engineering	Automotive Mechanical and Autotronics Technician
	Machinery and Heavy-Duty Vehicles Engineering	Machinery and Heavy-Duty Vehicles Technician
	Electricity and Industrial Automation Engineering	Electricity and Industrial Automation Technician
	Environmental Engineering	Renewable Energies Technician
	Agricultural Engineering	Agricultural Technician
		Electromechanical Maintenance Technician
Geology and Probing Control Technician
Veterinary and Livestock Technician
Food Quality Technician
School of Health	Biomedical Informatics	Clinical Laboratory and Blood Bank Technician
		Chemistry and Pharmacy Technician
Dental Technician
Nursing Technician
Radiodiagnosis and Radiotherapy Technician
Physical Preparation Technician
School of Tourism and Hotel Management	Turism and Hotel Industry	Hotel Management Technician
	Ecoturism	Adventure Tourism Technician
	Tourism & Hospitality	Tourism Technician, mention in Tourism Companies

=== Specialization and continuing education ===
Through the specialization programs, people and companies can opt for different courses, diplomas and also study plans, transforming them into complete study plans that allow the student to articulate and validate careers of the institution or also to focus them on their professional development.

=== Extension and Branches UC ===
See the main list with hyperlinks available in: DuocUC on spanish wikipedia.

Focus Area	Divisions and Extension Centers
Technical Secondary Education	Liceo Bicentenario Politécnico -Andes Polytechnic High School- (Foundation Subsidiary)
Diploma and specialization	Educación Continua DuocUC
R&D	CITT DuocUC: Innovation and Technology Transfer Center
R&D	Centro Innova
R&D	IA Applied Investigation
R&D	DDF Duoc Design Factory
Sports	DuocUC Sports
Culture & Arts	DuocUC Theater
Diploma and specialization	DuocUC Observatory
Communications	SOMOS Magazine
Communications	EscomTV
Employment	Duoc Laboral.cl
Comunicaciones	School of Communication Radios: AE Radio
Diploma and specialization	Teacher Training Center
R&D	Technology Centers for Engineering and Natural Resources
Culture & Arts	Extension Center: Cousiño Building (Valparaíso)
Culture & Arts	Extension Center: Íñiguez Palace (Santiago)
Communications	La Cantera Producer
Diploma and specialization	Center for the Regularization of Basic and High School Studies for Adults (Inactive)

== International Networks ==
DuocUC is an important actor within the Professional Technical field at a global and national level, being part of important international networks, thus providing opportunities for development and professional improvement to our students and foreign students:

=== Membership in International Networks ===
- World federation of colleges and polytechnics
- International Association of Universities and Colleges of Art Media and Design
- International Council of Design
- International Council of Societies of Industrial Design (WDO)
- Audio Engineering Society
- Global University Network for Innovation
- Global Alliance for Public Relations and Communication Management
- International Medical Informatics Association
- The Broadcast Education Association
- Inter-American Centre for Knowledge Development in Vocational Training
- SUNY COIL Network
- Design Factory Global Network

=== International Accreditation ===
The School of Design became accredited by the National Association of Schools of Art and Design (NASAD) in 2015

In 2015 the English Program at DuocUC achieved the Oxford Quality Gold Category from Oxford University Press

In 2012 our Biomedical Computing program received internacional accreditation by the International Medical Informatics Association.

=== Collaborative Projects ===
Design Factory DuocUC Design Factory is a Space of Collaborative Innovation based on the Design Factory model from the Aalto University in Finland. This center encourages the students' training and creativity as the fundamental component of the skills to innovate.

The Design Factory Global Network (DFGN) currently operates in eleven institutions of higher education around the world. The objective of this network and its partner members is to be the leader in international university collaboration, beyond academic boundaries.

== Institutional bond ==
- Pontificia Universidad Católica de Chile
- Archbishop of Santiago
- Annexed to Pontifical University, Holy See, Vatican State

== Notable alumni ==
- María Elena Swett, Chilean actress.
- Patricio "Pato" Escala Pierart, Chilean animator and film producer.
- Fernanda Urrejola, Chilean actress.
- Christiane Endler, Chilean footballer.

== Gallery ==
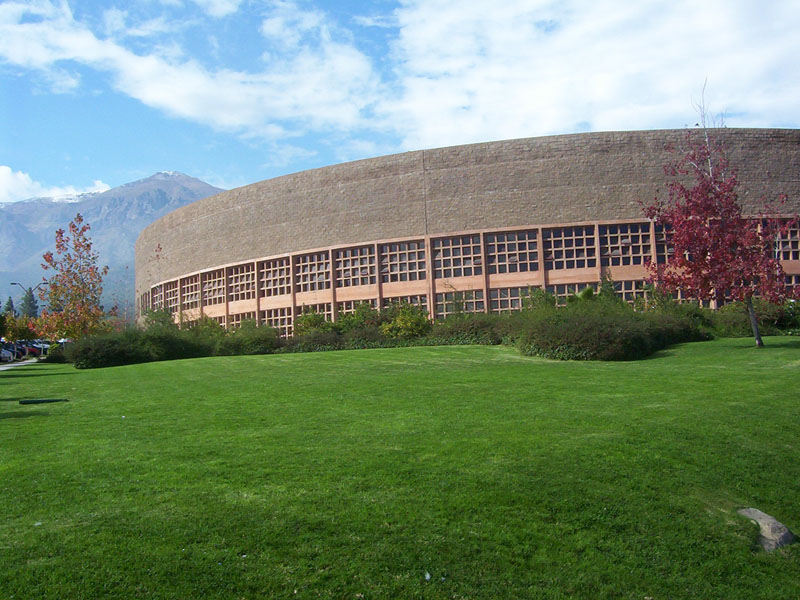
Campus San Carlos de Apoquindo

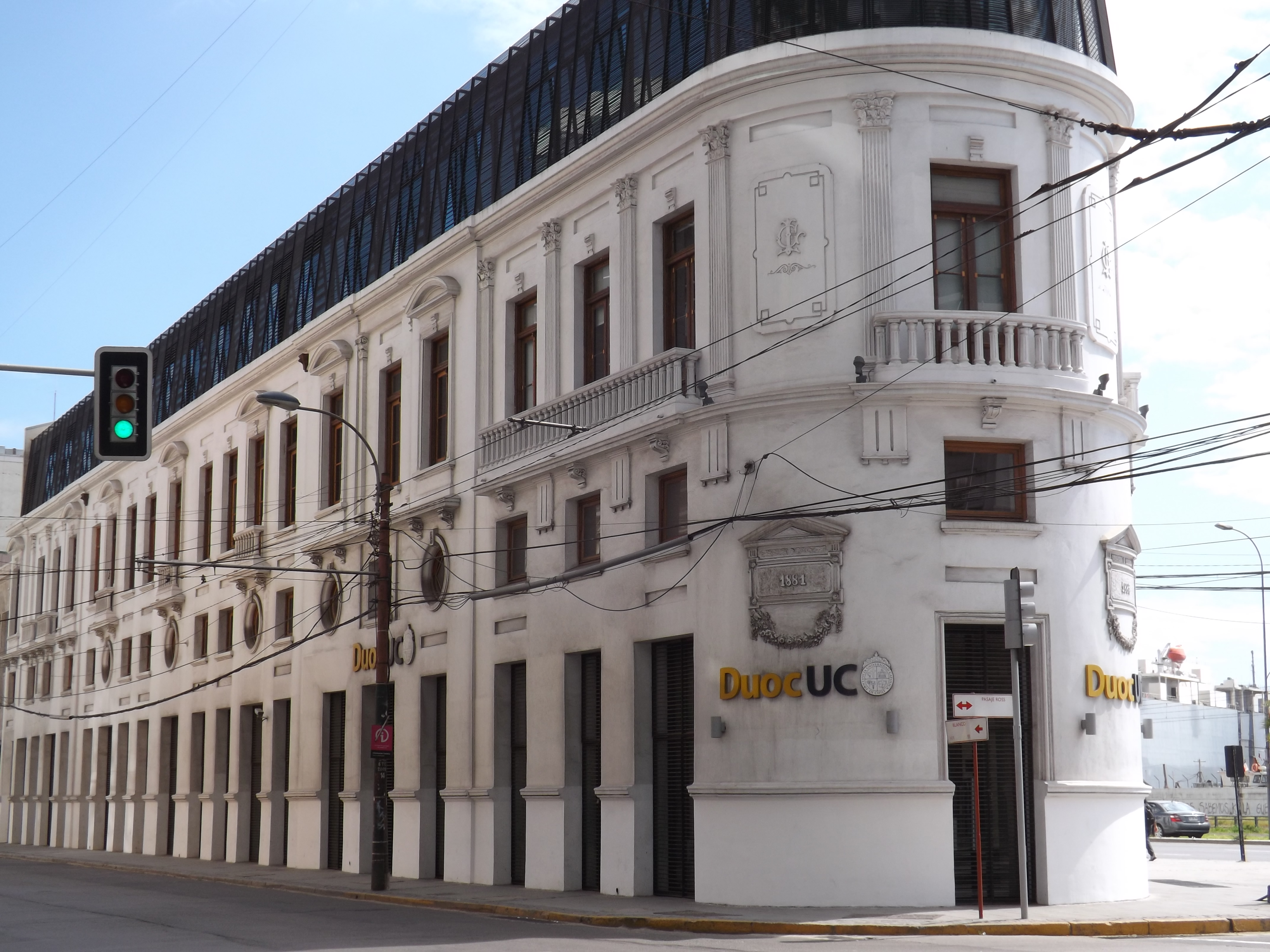
Centro de Extensión Edificio Cousiño, Valparaíso (Edificio patrimonial)

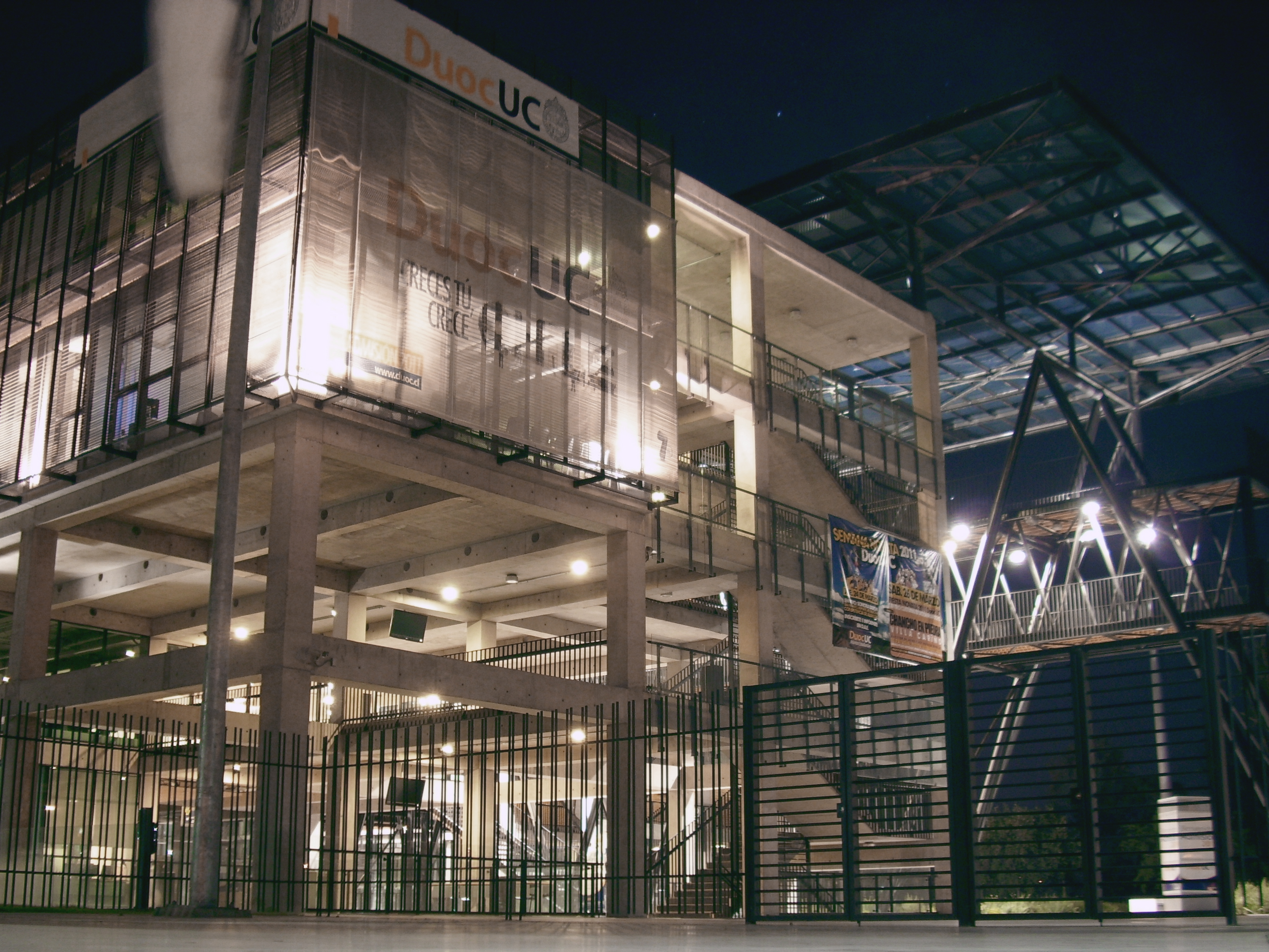
Campus Maipú, Santiago
