= Bárbara Ruiz-Tagle =

Chilean actress

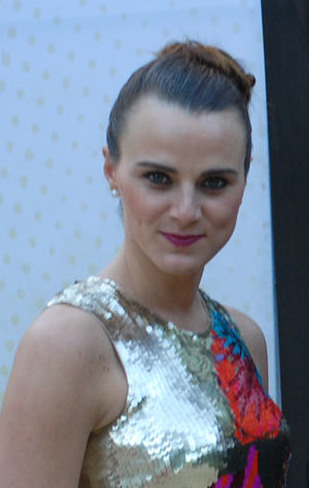
- Ruiz Tagle in 2011
- Born: Bárbara Ruiz-Tagle Correa; May 30, 1979 (age 46); Santiago, Chile
- Occupation: Actress

Bárbara Ruiz-Tagle Correa (born Santiago Chile May 30, 1979) is a Chilean actress of theater and television.

== Biography ==
She graduated from Universidad Finis Terrae in 2001 and traveled to Spain to specialize in theater dance.

She has participated in several TV series and her debut was in the soap opera Corazón de María from TVN, where she played a Russian mail order bride Irina Romanovna, the loved wife of Wladimir (Alfredo Castro).

She was a great asset to the night time soap opera from TVN, El señor de La Querencia, and more recently in ¿Dónde está Elisa?.

== Films ==
Soap Operas
Year	Soap Opera	Character	Channel
2007	Corazón de María	Irina Romanovna	TVN
2008	El señor de La Querencia	Leontina Aguirre	TVN
2009	Los Exitosos Pells	Miranda Varela	TVN
2009	¿Dónde está Elisa?	Juanita Ovalle	TVN
2010	Mujeres de Lujo	Virginia Letelier / Turquesa	Chilevisión
2011	Infiltradas	Amparo Barrientos / Alejandra	Chilevisión
2012	La Sexóloga	Romina Carvajal	Chilevisión
