= 1997 FINA World Junior Synchronised Swimming Championships =

The 5th FINA World Junior Synchronised Swimming Championships was held June 29-July 3, 1997, in Moscow, Russia. The synchronised swimmers are aged between 15 and 18 years old from 27 nations, swimming in three events: Solo, Duet and Team.

== Participating nations ==
27 nations swam at the 1997 World Junior Championships were:

- Australia
- Belarus
- Belgium
- Brazil
- Bulgaria
- Canada
- Chile
- China
- Egypt
- France
- Germany
- Great Britain
- Greece
- Hungary
- Israel
- Italy
- Japan
- Mexico
- Netherlands
- New Zealand
- Poland
- Russia
- South Africa
- Spain
- Switzerland
- Ukraine
- USA

== Results ==
Event	Gold		Silver		Bronze	
Solo details	Alexandra Vassina; Russia	91.390	Yoon Kyeong Jang (South Korea) Korea	90.639	Valérie Hould-Marchand; Canada	89.961
Duet details	Yoon Kyeong Jang; Min-Jeong Kim (South Korea) Korea	91.286	Alexandra Vassina; Ekaterina Androchina; Russia	90.608	Ayano Egami; Ikuyo Kihusawa; Japan	89.282
Team details	Russia	91.194	Japan	89.396	(United States) USA	89.357
