= Marco Antonio de la Parra =

Chilean psychiatrist, writer, and dramatist

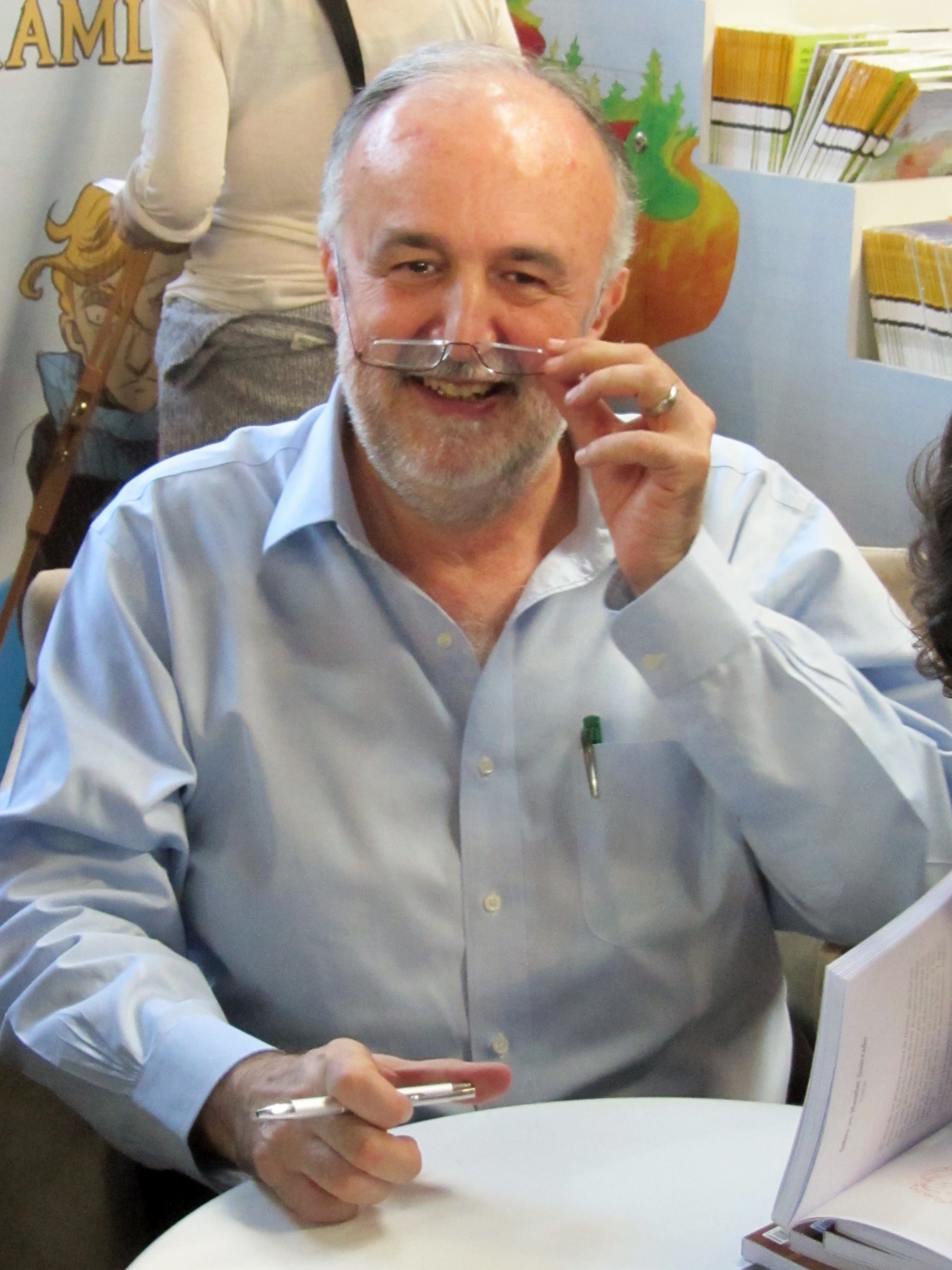
- At FILSA 2016
- Born: 23 January 1952 (age 74); Santiago, Chile
- Other name: Zap Zap
- Education: University of Chile
- Occupations: Psychiatrist, writer, dramatist
- Spouse: Ana Josefa Silva

Marco Antonio de la Parra (born 23 January 1952) is a Chilean psychiatrist, writer, and dramatist. Many of his works, which are strongly influenced by the country's 1973–90 military regime, satirize the national condition through metaphors. He is the author of more than 70 titles translated into several languages, including plays, novels, storybooks, and essays.

== Biography ==
Marco Antonio de la Parra studied at the National Institute and later enrolled at the University of Chile, where he graduated as a surgeon in 1976 and specialized in adult psychiatry.

His career as a dramatist began at the university, where he directed the Theater of the Faculty of Medicine from 1974 to 1976, and became known as a playwright. In 1975 he received an honorable mention in the university's dramaturgy competition for Matatangos, disparen sobre el zorzal, which would be released three years later.

In 1978, his play Lo crudo, lo cocido, lo podrido was censored prior to its premiere at the Catholic University. Hernán Larraín, the head of a commission representing the military regime, insisted that this was not a political persecution, writing, "We suppress it for the language and its content, which we consider disrespectful." María de la Luz Hurtado, a researcher for the university's theater school, disagreed with this, writing, "The work was not censored because there was rudeness, but for a political issue, obviously. There is no doubt that what is symbolized there is the authoritarian order."

Between 1984 and 1987, de la Parra directed the company La Teatroneta. He then founded the Theater of the Inextinguishable Passion. He was later artistic director of the Transatlantic Project, for scenic investigation and expanding the exchange of theatrical teaching between Chile and Spain. As an actor, he has interpreted many of his own works.

With Chile's return to democracy, after Augusto Pinochet was forced to surrender power due to his defeat in the 1988 plebiscite, de la Parra was appointed cultural attaché to the embassy in Spain by the government of Patricio Aylwin. He served in this position from January 1991 to September 1993.

On his return from Spain, he was a television critic for the evening edition of La Segunda, under the pseudonym Zap Zap, until 1998. De la Parra has ventured into several literary genres: story, novel, drama, essay, script, and chronicle. In addition, he has taught at the Catholic University, where he was Professor of Dramaturgy from 1993 to 1995. Beginning in 2005, he directed Finis Terrae University's School of Literature of the Faculty of Communications and Humanities and, from 2012 to 2015, its Theater School. At this house of studies he also directs the 21st Century Chair, which puts forward reflections on the great trends that are prevailing in the fields of culture, science, and social disciplines. He was the host of Puro cuento on Duna FM. In addition, he conducts dramaturgy workshops both in Chile and abroad.

As of 2014, he has a column in La Segunda.

In 1997 he was elected an active member of the Chilean Academy of Fine Arts, where he occupies chair No. 22. His works have been translated into several languages.

He is married to the journalist Ana Josefa Silva.

== The playwright ==
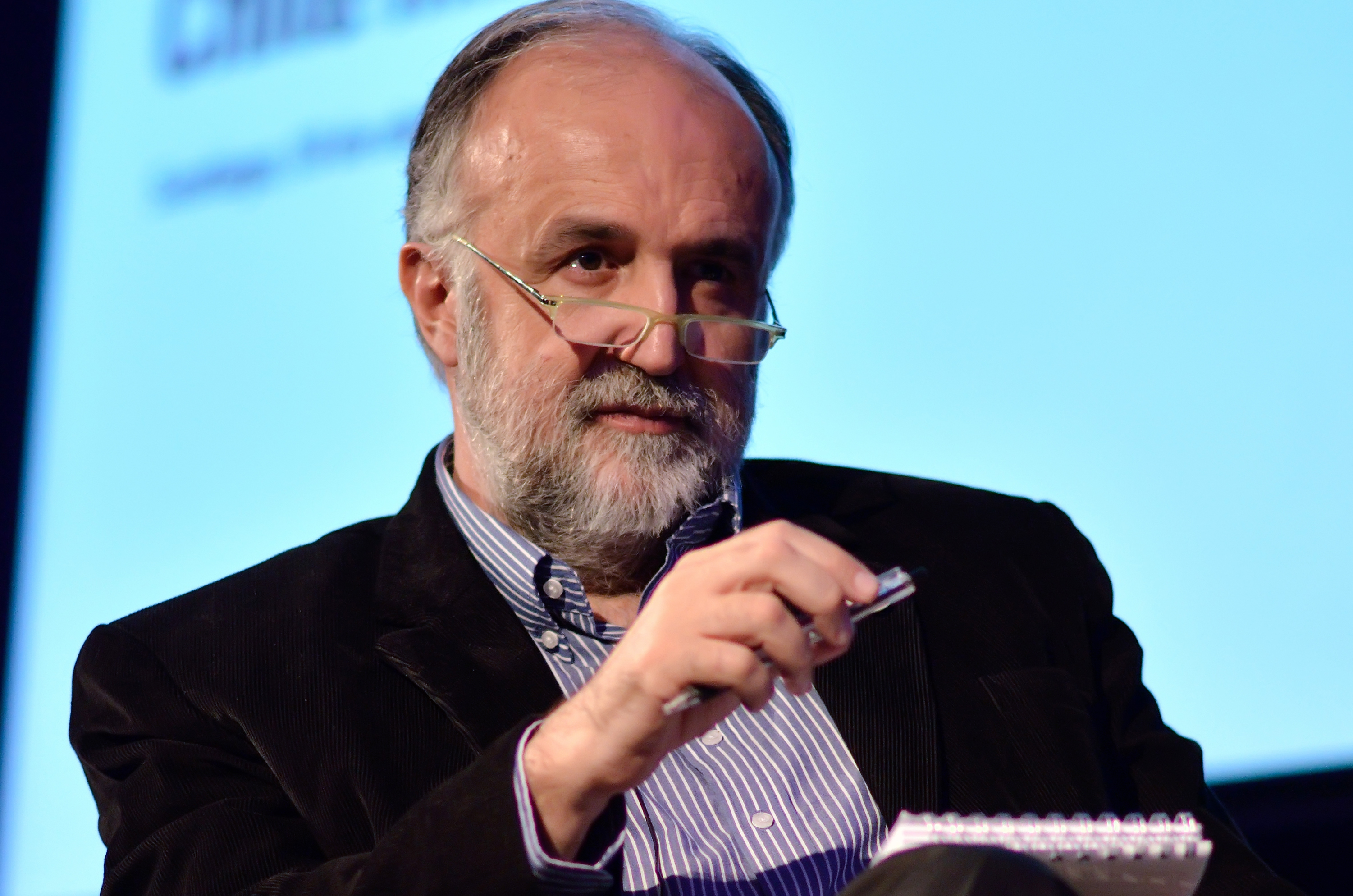
De la Parra in 2013

Professor Adolfo Albornoz Farías argues that,

From the thematic perspective, the theatrical production of Marco Antonio de la Parra is organized around three substantial investigations. The first is related to the permanent revision of Chilean history and identity, especially in its republican and modern context. The national imagination, its stories and myths, referents and icons, and its memory, have been preferentially examined in Lo crudo, lo cocido, lo podrido (1978), through La pequeña historia de Chile (1994). The second research project is related to the incessant siege of the subjectivity of the Chilean middle class at the end of the 20th century and the beginning of the 21st century. The main tensions of this class, their loves and hatreds, loyalties and betrayals, its political and economic determinants, have been particularly addressed, for example, in Infieles (1988), El continente negro (1994), Monogamia (2000), and Sushi (2003). The third obsession has been the permanent appropriation and resemantization, since the end of the century in Chile, of many of the main western cultural icons. Marx and Freud, Tarzan and Mandrake, Neruda and Dostoevsky, Shakespeare and Cervantes, Pinochet and Bush, Greek tragedy and reality shows, high tech and sushi, war and the mass media, etc., have been collected and reworked from Matatangos, disparen sobre el zorzal (1975), through La secreta obscenidad de cada día (1984), King Kong Palace o el exilio de Tarzán (1990), and Madrid/Sarajevo (1999), to Wittgenstein, el último filósofo (2004), among many other pieces.

== Works ==
- Lo crudo, lo cocido, lo podrido, play, 1978 (reedited by LOM, 2010)
- Lindo país esquina con vista al mar, coauthor, play, 1979
- La mar estaba serena, coauthor, play, 1980
- Teatro: Lo crudo, lo cocido, lo podrido / Matatangos, disparen sobre El zorzal, Santiago, Chile: Nacimiento, 1983 (prologue by Juan Andrés Piña)
- La secreta obscenidad de cada día, play, 1984
- El deseo de toda ciudadana, novel, Ediciones del Ornitorrinco, 1986; adapted for the theater in 1987 by director Ramón Griffero, and in 2017 by Elsa Poblete
- Sueños eróticos/Amores imposibles, stories, Ediciones del Ornitorrinco, 1986
- Infieles, play, 1988
- Obscenamente (in)fiel o una personal crónica de mi prehistoria dramatúrgica, professional autobiography, Santiago, Planeta, 1988
- La secreta guerra santa de Santiago de Chile, novel, Planeta, Santiago, 1989
- La noche de los volantines, coauthor, play, premiere: 1989, Teatro Ictus, directed by Nissim Sharim
- Cuerpos prohibidos, novel, Planeta, Santiago, 1991
- King Kong Palace o El exilio de Tarzán, play, 1990 (published by Pehuén, together with the following piece)
- Dostoievski va a la playa, play, 1990 (published by Pehuén, together with the previous piece)
- El padre muerto, play, 1991 (Menoría: Ediciones Premio Borne, 1992)
- Dédalus en el vientre de la bestia o Dédalus/Subamérica, play, 1992
- Telémaco/Subeuropa o El padre ausente, play, 1993
- Tristán e Isolda, play, 1993
- Heroína, play, Valladolid: Ediciones Premio Caja España, 1994
- El continente negro, play, CELCIT, Buenos Aires, 1994
- Ofelia o la madre muerta, play, 1994
- La pequeña historia de Chile, play, 1994
- La pérdida del tiempo, novel, Editorial Sudamericana, Santiago, 1994
- Cartas a un joven dramaturgo, essay, Santiago, Dolmen, 1995 (Mexico edition in 2007)
- Grandes éxitos y otros fracasos, stories, Planeta, Santiago, 1996. Contains ten previously published stories and six unpublished
- El ángel de la culpa y otros textos, Colcultura, 1996
- La mala memoria. Historia personal de Chile contemporáneo, essay, 1997
- La puta madre, play, 1997
- La vida privada/La puta madre, Casa de América, Madrid, 1998
- El televidente, essay in which he reflects on his experience as a TV critic in the second half of the 1980s; Planeta, Santiago, 1998
- Carta abierta a Pinochet. Monólogo de la clase media chilena con su padre, essay, Planeta, Santiago, 1998
- Teatro mutilado de Chile. Caracas and Santiago: Dolmen Ediciones, 1998. Contains:
  - Telemaco/Subeuropa (o El padre ausente) y La tierra insomne (o también La Orestiada de Chile [Tragedia griega sin griegos, Orestiada sin Orestes] o más propiamente conocida como La puta madre o igualmente La madre patria)
- Dios ha muerto, play, 1999
- Madrid/Sarajevo, play, 1999
- La familia, play, 1999
- Heroína. Teatro repleto de mujeres, Cuarto Propio, 1999
- Manual para entrar al siglo 21, essay, LOM, 1999
- Monogamia, play, 2000
- Novelas enanas, Alfaguara, 2000; contains 11 stories:
  - "Bajo la lluvia", "Mi padre hablaba boleros", "Querido Coyote", "Nunca se publicaron: las obras completas de Norton Jaramillo", "Pequeña novela gótica", "El maestro de Claudia", "Paul & John", "Nada es para siempre", "El libro negro del cine chileno", "Arena en las sábanas", and "No te quedes muda"
- (Estamos) en el aire, play, 2001
- El año de la ballena, young adult novel, Alfaguara, Serie Roja, 2001
- El cuerpo de Chile, Planeta/Ariel, Santiago, 2002
- El cuaderno de Mayra, young adult novel, Alfaguara, Serie Roja, 2002
- Anunciome, poems by de la Parra with drawings by Eva Lefever; BankBoston and Friends of Museums and Fine Arts Corporation, 2002
- Sobre los hombres (o lo que queda de ellos), Grijalbo, Santiago, 2003
- Sushi, play, 2003
- El Cristo entrando en Bruselas (basado en el cuadro de James Ensor), novel, Editorial Cuarto Propio, Santiago, 2003
- La sexualidad secreta de los hombres, 2004
- Wittgenstein, el último filósofo, play, 2004
- Te amaré toda la vida, novel, Plaza Janés, 2005
- El teatro, la escena secreta, play, premiered by the Chilean National Theater in 2006
- Crear o caer, essay, Ediciones B, Buenos Aires, 2006
- La cruzada de los niños, play, premiered in 2006
- Decapitation, play; premiered in 2006; directed by Jesús Barranco, Blenamiboá and El Tinglao companies
- Vencer la depresión, psychology, editorial Vergara, 2009
- Paul & John, theatrical adaptation of the novela enana, brought to the stage in 2010 by Daniel Lattus
- La casa de Dios, 2007
- La entrevista, o El piano mundo
- La secreta obscenidad de cada día, anthology, with prologue by Teresina Bueno; Arte y Escena; 2010, Mexico D.F. Containing:
  - La secreta obscenidad de cada día, Telémaco/Sub-Europa, o El padre ausente, El deseo de toda ciudadana, Querido coyote, and Tristán e Isolda
- El libro de David, 2010
- Para qué leer, 2011
- Ex ex, play, premiered in 2012
- El loco de Cervantes, play, one-person show, premiere: 28 May 2012; direction: Julio Pincheira
- La sangre de Xile, play, premiere: 6 September 2012; direction: Raúl Osorio
- El año que nos volvimos todos un poco locos, book, 2012
- El dolor de Xile, premiere: 4 July 2013, Chilean National Theater; direction: Raúl Osorio
- La UP, premiere: 2 August 2013, Finis Terrae University theater; direction: Francisco Krebs
- La vida doble, theatrical adaptation of the novel of the same name by Arturo Fontaine Talavera, premiere: 31 July 2014, Finis Terrae theater; direction: Claudia Fernández
- Los pájaros cantan en griego, premiere: 22 July 2015, Finis Terrae theater; direction: Aliocha de la Sotta
- El amo, one-person show, 2017

== Awards and recognitions ==
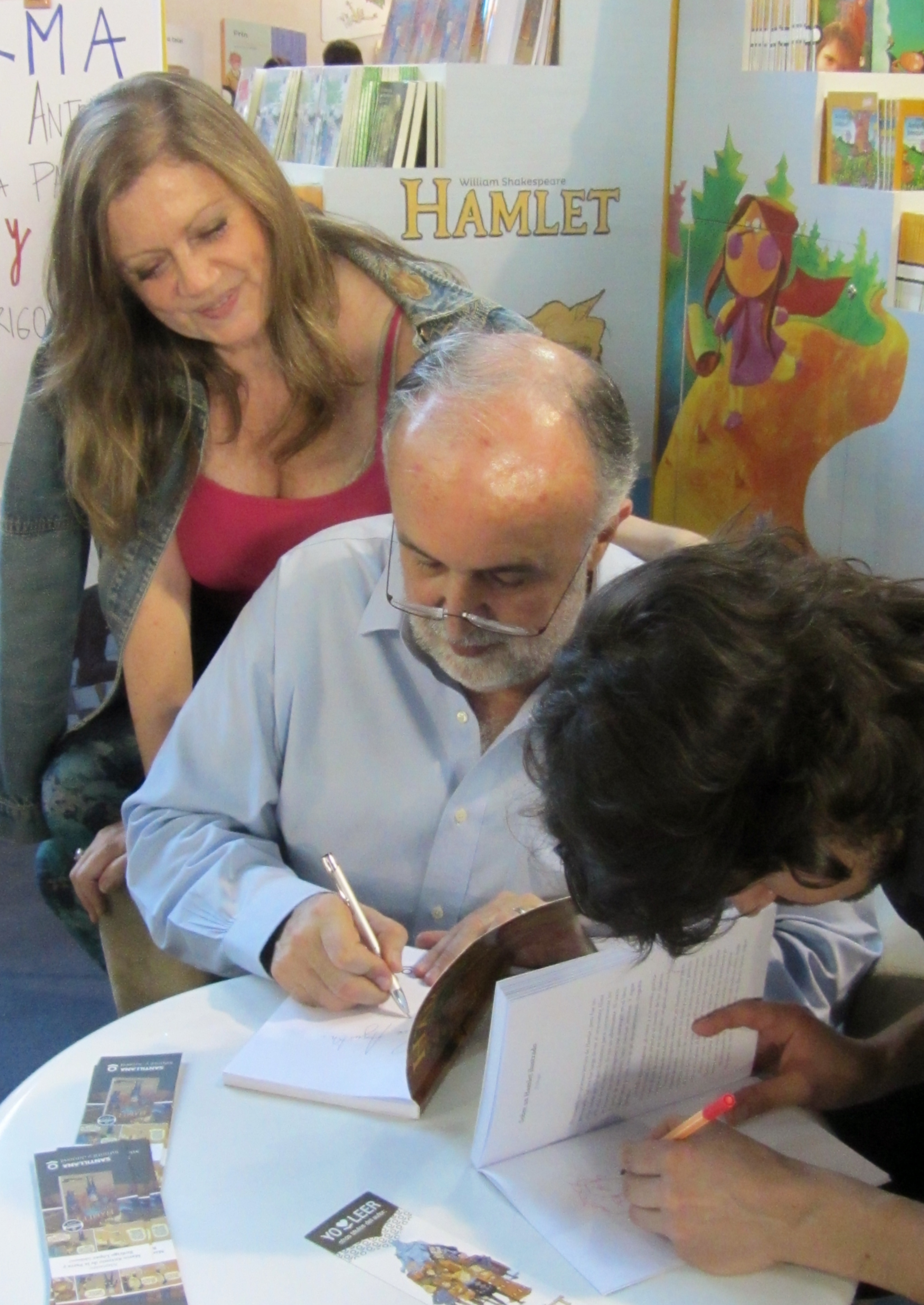
De la Parra signing copies of his adaptation of Hamlet with his wife Ana Josefa Silva and the cartoonist Rodrigo López, November 2016

- 1979 Latin American Theater Award, New York, for Lo crudo, lo cocido, lo podrido
- 1987 Ediciones Ornitorrinco Novel Contest Award for El deseo de toda ciudadana
- 1991 Borne Award, Spain, for El padre muerto
- 1993 Brief Theater Award, Spain, for Tristán e Isolda
- Andes Foundation Grant (1994)
- Prize of the Chile National Book Council on various occasions (1994–1995 and 2000–2004)
- 1996 José Nuez Martín Award for La pequeña historia de Chile
- 1996 Association of Entertainment Journalists Award in Best Dramaturgy and Best Assembly for La pequeña historia de Chile
- Guggenheim Fellowship (2000)
- Finalist for the 2000 Altazor Award for Dramaturgy with Madrid/Sarajevo and La puta madre
- Finalist for the 2001 Altazor Award for Dramaturgy with La vida privada
- Finalist for the 2003 Altazor Award for Dramaturgy with Las costureras
- 2003 Max Hispanoamericano Award for Performing Arts (General Society of Authors and Publishers of Spain)
- 2004 National Book and Reading Council Award for Best Unpublished Theater Work for Australia
- Saulo Benavente Award for the Best Foreign Show presented in Buenos Aires during 2004 for La secreta obscenidad de cada día
- Iberescena Fellowship (2009–2010)
