= Ernesto Díaz Espinoza =

Chilean filmmaker

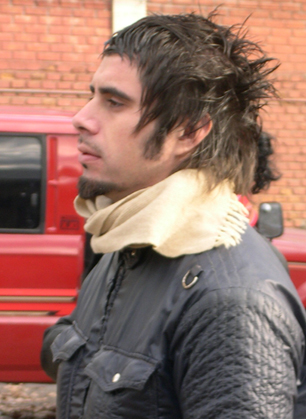
- Ernesto Díaz Espinoza at the set of Kiltro
- Born: Ernesto José Díaz Espinoza; June 10, 1978 (age 47); Santiago, Chile
- Occupation: Filmmaker
- Website: twitter.com/ErnestoDiazEsp

Ernesto Díaz Espinoza (born June 10, 1978, in Santiago, Chile) is a Chilean editor, film director and writer best known for his films Kiltro (2006), Mirageman (2007), The ABCs of Death (2012), Bring Me the Head of the Machine Gun Woman (2012), Redeemer (2014) and The Fist of the Condor (2023).

== Career ==
He studied Audio Visual Communication in Cinema and Television. He took a course in scriptwriting at the University of Pompeau Fabra in Barcelona, Spain.

In 2006 he wrote, directed, and edited his first feature film and the first South American martial arts film, Kiltro. He was honored as the best Chilean director and writer of 2006 by wiken.

Mirageman, his second feature, received even more critical acclaim and received numerous audience awards in genre film festivals from around the world. Film critic Harry Knowles wrote, "Mirageman is probably one my favorite superhero movies of all time."

Mandrill has been referred to as a cross between James Bond films and 1970's blaxploitation films. It had its world premiere at 2009 Fantastic Fest Film Festival where it won best actor for Marko Zaror and best Fantastic Fest Feature. In 2010 it wins the audience award at the Vina Del Mar International Film Festival. In 2011 it won best action film at FANTASPOA in Brazil.

In 2012 he wrote and directed Bring Me the Head of the Machine Gun Woman, which combined the 1970s blaxploitation genre with Latin American culture. In the same year, he directed a short in The ABCs of Death, a horror anthology directed by genre filmmakers from around the world.

Santiago Violenta, a crime comedy with the tagline "A Story of Guns and Mixed Drinks", premiered at the Valdivia International Film Festival in 2014. It won the audience award for best Chilean movie. That same year Redeemer, a modern western with martial arts, premiered at the 2014 Fantastic Fest Film Festival.

== Filmography ==
- Kiltro (2006)
- Mirageman (2007)
- Mandrill (2009)
- The ABCs of Death (2012) segment C is for Cycle
- Bring Me the Head of the Machine Gun Woman (2012)
- Santiago Violenta (2014)
- Redeemer (2014)
- Fuerzas Especiales 2: Cabos Sueltos (2015)
- The Fist of the Condor (2023)
- Diablo (2025)
