= José Secall =

Chilean actor and theater director (1949–2021)

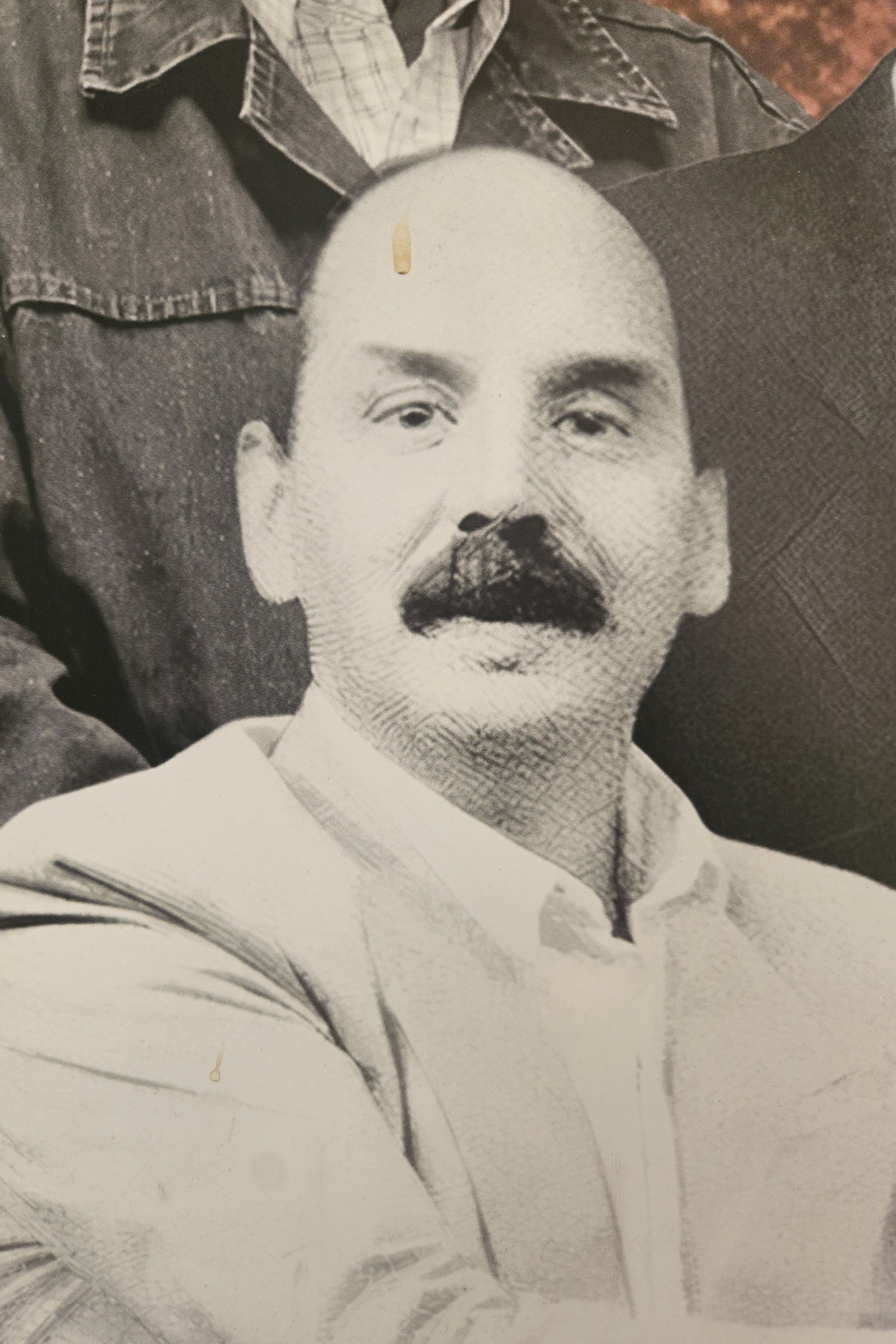
- José Secall in Teatro Ictus
- Born: José Arístides Manuel Secall Parada; June 18, 1949; Santiago, Chile
- Died: July 5, 2021 (aged 72); Santiago, Chile
- Occupation: Actor
- Years active: 1969–2020
- Children: Adela Secall

José Arístides Manuel Secall Parada (Santiago, June 18, 1949 – July 5, 2021) also known in the artistic world as Pepe Secall, was a Chilean actor and theater director. Until shortly before his death, he was active in film, television, and theater.

He was a member of the Communist Party of Chile and son-in-law of the communist politician Luis Corvalán. Due to that, he was exiled politically during the military dictatorship in the Soviet Union, where he had his daughter in 1979, also an actress, Adela Secall.

== Career ==
Secall became known professionally with the Teatro Ictus company, a group that he left in 1976 to join another theatrical project: La Feria, together with Jaime Vadell, a company that, installed in a marquee, would be in charge of premiering one of the most controversial works against the military dictatorship, Hojas de Parra.

He entered the telenovelesque genre belatedly – due to his political exile in the Soviet Union – only in the 1990s. He was for many years part of the staff of actors of the television series of the first semester of Canal 13.

His first appearance was in 1984, in the telenovela Andrea, Justicia de mujer, but due to his exile in the Soviet Union, he was banned from television until 1990. With the return of democracy to Chile, he began to participate in telenovelas of Television Nacional de Chile; El milagro de vivir. Later, he was hired by Channel 13 and performed in Marrón Glacé, Champagne, El amor está de moda, Eclipse de luna, Amándote, Fuera de control, Sabor a tí, Piel canela ad Ídolos. In the last one, he shared roles with his daughter in real life, Adela Secall. He also participated in the children's program Pin Pon on TVN between 1991 and 1993 with Jorge Guerra characterizing Amigo Pepe.

In 2009, he returned to Channel 13, with Cuenta conmigo y Feroz. However, he only held four jobs and then left television screens.

In 2014, he returned to television in the TVN series Pulseras rojas, portraying Benito.

In 2016, he returned to Chilean television again with Preciosas, also on Channel 13, in which he has managed to do his most work. In his life he has made 20 television jobs, since 1990. With a total of 10 supporting roles, 4 co-leading roles, one antagonistic, and 4 special participations.

== Personal life ==
In 1972 he met the dance student, Vivana Corvalán —daughter of the general secretary of the PC, Luis Corvalán—, with whom he formed a relationship until the beginning of 1980. He is the father of the actress Adela Secall Corvalán, who was born in 1979, while he was in his political exile in Moscow, after the military dictatorship of Augusto Pinochet. He has a first-born daughter named María and another named Masha, born in Russia. He is the nephew of actor Roberto Parada, cousin of José Manuel Parada Maluenda and paternal uncle of Javiera Parada. The actor maintained a sentimental bond in his adolescence with the actress Sonia Viveros, with whom he was reunited after his return to Chile and forged a great friendship.

He was a member of the Communist Party of Chile.

== Filmography ==
=== Film ===
- 1969: Caliche sangriento, directed by Helvio Soto.
- 1989: Contigo a la distancia, directed by José Caviedes.
- 1994: Amnesia, directed by Gonzalo Justiniano.
- 2004: El aspado, dirigido por Patricio Bustamante.
- 2014: Neruda, directed by Manuel Basoalto
- 2018: Nadar de noche, directed by Paulo Brunetti.

=== Telenovelas ===
Year	Telenovela	Role	Channel
1984	Andrea, justicia de mujer	Policía	Canal 13
1990	¿Te conté?	Doctor de Leo	Canal 13
1990	El milagro de vivir	Claudio Morán Rigaux	TVN
1991	Volver a empezar	Clemente Castellón	TVN
1993	Marrón Glacé	Óscar Ponce	Canal 13
1994	Champaña	Gastón González	Canal 13
1995	El amor está de moda	Agustín Andrade	Canal 13
1996	Marrón Glacé, el regreso	Óscar Ponce	Canal 13
1997	Eclipse de Luna	Camilo Mansilla	Canal 13
1998	Amándote	Carlos Fuentes	Canal 13
1999	Fuera de Contro	Ted Castro	Canal 13
2000	Sabor a ti	Padre Cayetano Cubillos	Canal 13
2001	Piel Canela	Aníbal Callejas	Canal 13
2004–2005	Ídolos	Antonio Figueroa	TVN
2009	Cuenta conmigo	Juan San Martín	Canal 13
2010	Feroz	Hugo Navarro	Canal 13
2010	Primera Dama	Heriberto Simonne	Canal 13
2011	Peleles	Ricardo Barahona	Canal 13
2016–2017	Preciosas	Patricio Rojas	Canal 13
2019–2020	Gemelas	José "Pepucho" Rivera	Chilevisión

=== TV Series ===
Year	TV Series	Role	Channel
1990	Corín Tellado: Mis mejores historias de amor	Daniel	TVN
2010	Adiós al séptimo de línea	Antonio Latorre	Mega
2013	Los archivos del cardenal	Sergio Valech	TVN
2014	Pulseras rojas	Benito	TVN
2015	Los años dorados	Rigoberto	UCV Televisión
