= Roberto Poblete =

Chilean actor and politician

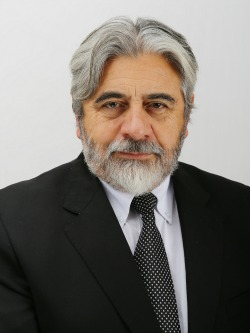
- Poblete in 2014

Member of the Chamber of Deputies
- In office 11 March 2014 – 11 March 2018
- Preceded by: Joel Rosales
- Succeeded by: District created
- Constituency: 47th District

Personal details
- Born: 8 January 1955 (age 71) Los Angeles, Chile
- Education: Pontifical Catholic University of Chile; University of Chile
- Profession: Actor

Roberto Fortunato Poblete Zapata (Los Ángeles, January 8, 1955) is a Chilean actor, director, teacher, presenter, announcer and politician. He is known for having participated in several television series on Canal 13 and Chilevisión. He served as a deputy for Los Angeles from 2014 to 2018.

== Performing arts career ==
Roberto Poblete was born in the city of Los Angeles in 1955. His parents are Fortunato Poblete and María Zapata from Quillón and Mulchén respectively. He studied at the German Lyceum in the city of Los Angeles.

He studied at the School of Communication Arts at the Catholic University of Chile. He graduated as an actor in 1979 with the thesis Relationships in the construction of the character.

He is a candidate for a Master of Arts, with a Mention in Theater Directing, from the University of Chile.

He has acted in numerous plays such as Dreams of bad death (1982), Spring with a broken corner (1984), The clowns of hope, Our father who are in bed (2002), Dreams of memory (2004), Squatting (2005) —for which he was nominated for Altazor 2006—, El grito (2006), Atascados en la Salala (2009), Nice country corner with a sea view (2010), Get up and run (2011) and Someone has to stop (2013).

He has also dedicated himself to the theatrical direction of various productions such as We were all going to be queens, Three nights on a Saturday and The King arrives.

He has done extensive teaching work at various universities in the country, including the Pontificia Universidad Católica de Chile, UNIACC and Universidad de Santiago de Chile. He was the director and founder of the theater career at the Bolivarian University of Los Angeles.

In cinema, he participated in the feature films Sexto A (1985) and Dos mujeres en la ciudad (1990), both by Claudio di Girólamo; La estación del regreso (1987) of Leo Kocking; La historia de un roble solo (1982) and La luna en el espejo (1990), both by Silvio Caiozzi; País de octubre (1990) by Daniel de la Vega; and Cuestión de ubicación of Luciano Tarifeño.

He has acted in various telenovelas such as Villa Los Aromos (1981), Los títeres (1984), La última cruz, Cerro Alegre, Marrón Glacé (1993), El amor está de moda (1995), and Marparaíso (1998) . He has also participated in television series such as Crónicas de un hombre santo (1990), La patrulla del desierto (1993) and Casados (2005); and in various children's and comedy programs, such as El desjueves, De Chincol a Jote, a program where he popularized the section "Humbertito y Gaspar" with Cristián García-Huidobro, Vamos Chile, El tiempo es oro, among others.

== Political career ==
In the 2013 parliamentary elections, he ran as a candidate for the Chamber of Deputies for the 47th district, which includes, among other places, the city of Los Angeles, supported by the Socialist Party of Chile. He obtained 12.96% of the votes, remaining thirdly, but being elected due to the Binomial voting. He took office on March 11, 2014. He is a member of the permanent commissions on Human Rights and Indigenous Peoples; Economy, Development; Micro, Small and Medium Enterprises; Consumer Protection and Tourism; and Culture, Arts and Communications.

He sought to once again integrate the Chamber of Deputies, this time for the new 21st district, in the 2017 parliamentary elections. He obtained 12,309 votes, equivalent to 6.46%, not being re-elected.

== Filmography ==
=== Films ===
- Historia de un roble solo (1982)
- VIº A 1965 (1986)
- La estación del regreso (1987)
- País de octubre (1990)
- La Luna en el espejo (1990)
- Dos mujeres en la ciudad (1990)
- The Wandering Soap Opera (1990, released in 2017)

=== Telenovelas ===
Telenovelas
Year	Telenovelas	Role	Channel
1977	La colorina	Richard Varela	TVN
1981	Villa Los Aromos	Sergio del Río	TVN
1984	Los títeres	Bruno Cañas	Canal 13
1985	Matrimonio de papel	Mauricio Poblete	Canal 13
1986	Secreto de familia	Carvajal	Canal 13
1987	La última cruz	Ulises	Canal 13
1988	Vivir así	Richard	Canal 13
1989	La intrusa	Segundo	Canal 13
1990	¿Te Conté?	Pedro	Canal 13
1993	Marrón Glacé	Néstor	Canal 13
1994	Champaña	Leonardo	Canal 13
1995	El amor está de moda	Aristóteles Sepúlveda / Vittorio Valentini	Canal 13
1996	Marrón Glacé, el regreso	Néstor	Canal 13
1997	Eclipse de luna	Dante O'Neal	Canal 13
1998	Marparaíso	Gregorio Leal	Canal 13
1999	Cerro Alegre	Capitán Memo Méndez	Canal 13
2001	Corazón pirata	Yamil Saud	Canal 13
2009	Sin anestesia	Domingo Quiñones	Chilevisión
2010	Mujeres de lujo	Víctor Tapia	Chilevisión
2011	Infiltradas	Luis Alegría	Chilevisión

=== TV Series ===
- De chincol a jote (Canal 13, 1987–1993) – Varios personajes
- La patrulla del desierto (Canal 13, 1993) – Pedro Salcedo
- Vamos Chile (Red TV, 2003)
- Casado con hijos (Mega, 2007) – Dr. Indigo
