= Liliana García =

Uruguayan actress

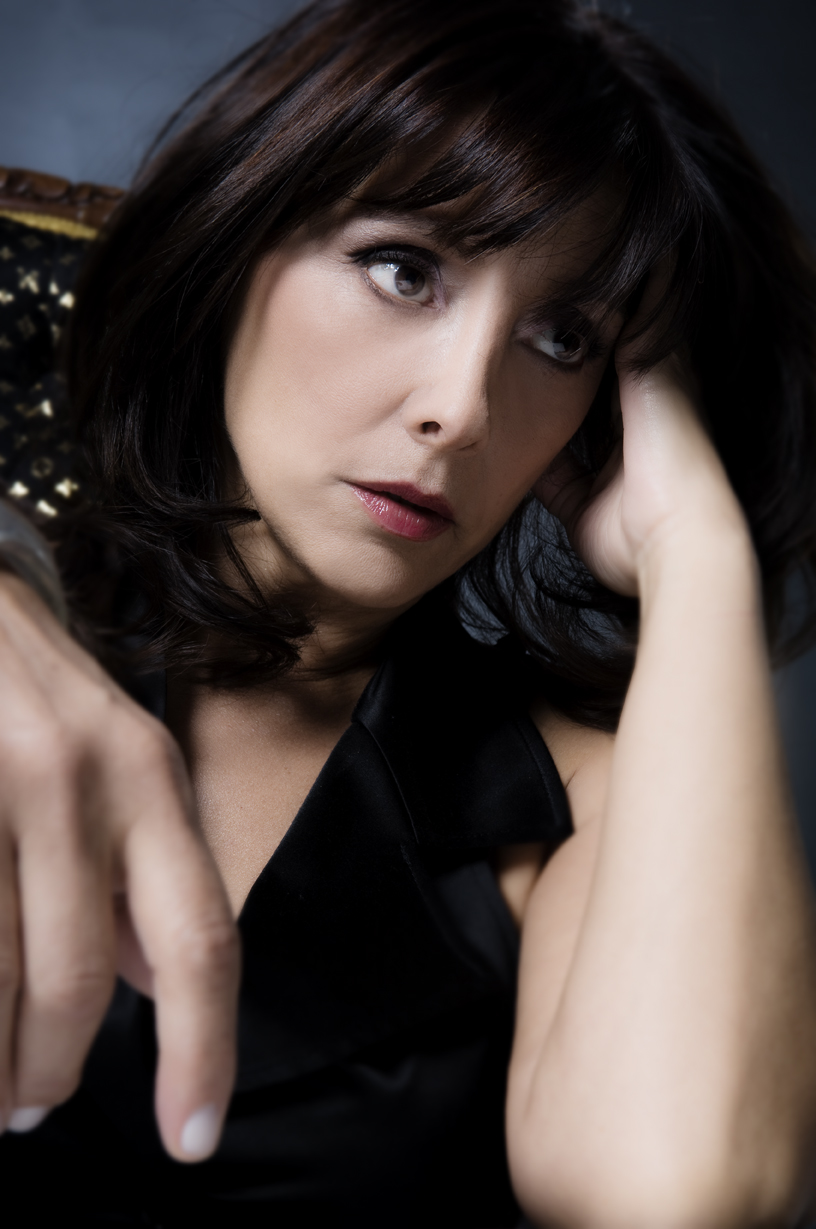
- García in 2009
- Born: Liliana García Sosa; 17 October 1957 (age 68); Montevideo, Uruguay
- Occupations: Actress, theatre director, producer, and solicitor
- Spouses: Héctor Guido (m. 1979; div. 1983) Mauricio Pesutic (m. 1987; div. 1992) Marco Consolo (m. 2009)
- Children: Vicenta Pesutic García
- Website: www.lilianagarciasosa.com

Liliana García Sosa (born 17 October 1957) is an Uruguayan-Spanish actress, solicitor, human rights activist, and theater director with a recognized career in film, theater, and television in Chile.

In 2008 she was appointed Cultural Attaché ad honorem of the Embassy of Uruguay in Chile, a position she holds to this day.

She received the Cavaliere dell'Ordine Della Stella D'Italia decoration in 2018, awarded in recognition of her professional career not only in art, but also in cultural management, creating bridges of collaboration and exchange between both countries and their cultures.

From 2020 to 2022, she was a member of the Board of Directors of the Chilean Human Rights Commission.

== Biography ==
During her childhood in Uruguay, she completed her primary and secondary education at the Elbio Fernández School in Montevideo.

In 1981, she graduated from the Dramatic Arts School of the Teatro Circular de Montevideo – later specializing in performing arts teaching – and in 1976, from the Dramatic Arts School of Teatro El Galpón.

At the same time, she studied law at the University of the Republic, where she became a student leader in the pursuit of joint government and autonomy for the institution. She also played an important role as a union leader in the Uruguayan Society of Actors.

She earned her degree as a solicitor, and a year before completing her law degree, she dropped out of university to move to Chile.

She attended artistic training workshops nationally and internationally, with prominent figures such as Eugenio Barba, Aderbal Freire Filho, José Estruch, Patricia Ariza, Santiago García, Ramón Griffero, Atahualpa del Cioppo, and Nelly Goitiño.

She also joined the regular cast of Teatro Circular de Montevideo from 1977 to 1987.

She worked with prestigious directors of the Uruguayan scene, including Roberto Fontana, Júver Salcedo, Omar Grasso, Héctor Manuel Vidal, Jorge Curi, Dervy Vilas, Santiago Introini, and Sebastián Barrios.

In 1987, she moved to Chile where she continued her theatrical activities, working under the direction of Delfina Guzmán, Liliana Ross, Mateo Iribarren, Cristián Campos, Rodrigo Muñoz, Manuel Calzada Pérez (Spain), Pete Brooks (England), and Tomás Vidiella, among others. It was there that she began to develop a significant career in television and film.

In cinema, she worked under the direction of Raúl Ruiz (France), Gonzalo Justiniano (Chile), Esteban Schroeder (Uruguay), Jörg Grünler (Germany), Sebastián Lelio (Chile), Juan Carlos Rodríguez Castro (Uruguay), among others.

On television, she has worked in over 50 fiction productions since 1988, for Chilean networks TVN, Mega, Chilevisión, and Canal 13. She starred in productions such as Bravo, El amor está de moda, Adrenalina, Rossabella, and A todo dar.

She continued her work at the Union of Actors and Actresses of Chile (Sidarte), and was part of the creation of the Chileactores Management Society, serving as a board member for nine years.

She has premiered around twenty theatrical productions, many of which had long runs and international tours in Argentina, Spain, England, Scotland, Italy, among other countries.

She has also taught workshops and ventured into university-level teaching.

Her proven and committed career led to her appointment in 2008 by then-Uruguayan President Tabaré Vázquez as Cultural Attaché ad honorem for the Embassy of Uruguay in Chile, a position she holds to this day. In 2009, SODRE honored her by featuring her portrait in the third edition of the "Uruguayan Women" photographic exhibition. This exhibition aimed to pay tribute to Uruguayan women who have excelled in various fields of national endeavor.

In October 2014, she starred in the play El Diccionario by Manuel Calzada Pérez at the Gabriela Mistral Cultural Center (GAM). The play was directed by the Spanish playwright himself, who was awarded the National Dramatic Literature Award of Spain that same year. The production ran for two seasons in Chile and was selected by the Cultural Affairs Directorate (Dirac) of the Chilean Ministry of Foreign Affairs for a tour through Uruguay and Italy.

In 2017, she premiered Operación Condor: El Vuelo de Laura, based on her own original concept with dramaturgy by Daniela Lillo. The Italian Ministry of Cultural Heritage and Activities (MIBACT) recognized the work as a Special Project in 2017. The play was presented at the Theatre of Marcellus in Rome and participated in the Quartieri dell'Arte Festival in Vitorchiano, Italy. It also featured in the International Festival Teatro a Mil (FITAM) in Chile, and at El Galpón Theater in Uruguay.

In 2023, commemorating the 50th anniversary of the Chilean coup d'état, she directed a new staging of this play with a Latin American team. It was presented in various cities across Chile, as well as in Montevideo and Buenos Aires.

== Television ==
Television
Year	Series	Role	Channel
1988	Semidiós	Karen	Canal 13
1988	Matilde dedos verdes	Claudia	Canal 13
1989	Bravo	Myriam Solorsano	Canal 13
1990	Acércate más	Estela Valentti	Canal 13
1991	Ellas por ellas	Wanda Cáceres	Canal 13
1992	Fácil de amar	Macarena Romo	Canal 13
1993	Doble juego	Ester Bernal	Canal 13
1994	Top secret	Eliana Bernal	Canal 13
1995	El amor está de moda	Jacqueline	Canal 13
1996	Marrón Glacé, el regreso	María José	Canal 13
1996	Adrenalina	Renata Winter	Canal 13
1997	Rossabella	Sofía Benavides	Mega
1998	A todo dar	Oriana McLean	Mega
1999	Algo está cambiando	Alicia Méndez	Mega
2001	Piel canela	Lilia	Canal 13
2002	Buen partido	Gracia Sánchez	Canal 13
2003	16	Oriana Arias	TVN
2004	Ídolos	Emilia Escorza	TVN
2005	17	Oriana Arias	TVN
2006	Amor en tiempo récord	Teresa Olarra	TVN
2006	Entre medias	Vecina de Maite	TVN
2006	Montecristo	Susana	Mega
2007	Vivir con 10	María José Navarro / Mariana	CHV
2009	Los exitosos Pells	Consuelo Balaguer	TVN
2013	Socias	Bernardita Risopatrón	TVN
2014	Mamá mechona	Aurora Larrañaga	Canal 13
2014	Valió la pena	Fernanda Vicuña	Canal 13
2016	Veinteañero a los 40	Sara Parker	Canal 13

=== Series ===
Television
Year	Series	Role	Channel	Notes
2002	La vida es una lotería	Karen	TVN	Guest (episode "Hermanas")
2003	Cuentos de Mujeres	Meche	TVN	Guest
2004	Bienvenida realidad	Carola	TVN	
2005	Tiempo final: en tiempo real	Alejandra	TVN	
2005	Heredia & Asociados	Agatha	TVN	
2005	La Nany	Rebeca Errázuriz	Mega	Guest
2006	Urgencias	Dra. Carmen Grez	Mega	
2007	Mujeres que matan	Eloiza Cárdenas	CHV	
2008	El blog de la Feña	Josefina McGellar	Canal 13	
2009	La ofis	Jimena Ibarra	Canal 13	
2009	Mis años grossos	Silvia Guzmán	CHV	
2012	Vida por vida	María Inés	Canal 13	Guest
2013	El hombre de tu vida	Lorena	Canal 13	Guest
2014	Los archivos del cardenal	Isabel	TVN	
2014	Sudamerican Rockers	Madre de Celeste	CHV	
2019	Isla Paraíso	Luciana Bandini	Mega	

== Theater ==
Year	Play	Authors	Direction	Notes
1976/1977	Teatro Popular Español	Federico García Lorca, Ramón del Valle Inclán, Rafael Alberti, cancionero anónimo español.	Roberto Fontana	
1976/1977	Teatro Rioplatense	Florencio Sánchez, Roberto Cossa, Jacobo Lagsner, Juan Graña, Alberto Paredes.	Roberto Fontana	
1978	Juegos a la Hora de la Siesta	Roma Mahieu	Carlos Aguilera	
1979	El Jardín de los Cerezos	Antón Pávlovich Chéjov	Dervy Vilas	
1979	Ricardo III	William Shakespeare	Héctor Manuel Vidal	
1979/1980	La Trastienda	Carlos Maggi	Júver Salcedo	
1980/1981	Mariana Pineda	Federico García Lorca	Jorge Curi	
1982	Doña Ramona	Víctor Manuel Leites	Jorge Curi	Seasons in: Teatro Circular de Montevideo, General San Martín Municipal Theater in Buenos Aires, Argentina. Florencio Award for Best Play.
1983	Los Engañados	Lope de Rueda	Santiago Introini	
1983	La Rebelión de las Mujeres	Basada en Lisístrata de Aristófanes	Mercedes Rein and Jorge Curi	
1983	Vivir Para Atrás	Juan Graña	Juan Graña	
1985	Las Raíces	Milton Schinca	Santiago Introini	
1986	Doña Ramona	Víctor Manuel Leites	Jorge Curi	Performance in major Spanish cities. Ibero-American Award for Best Show at the Huelva Festival. Presented as the opening piece of the first Cadiz Theatre Festival, Spain.
1989	Doña Ramona	Víctor Manuel Leites	Jorge Curi	Televisión Española, Ibero-American theater series.
1990	Taxi	Ray Cooney	Cristián Campos	
1993	Albertina en Cinco Tiempos	Michael Tremblay	Delfina Guzmán	
1994	Taxi	Ray Cooney	Cristián Campos	
1995	Sangre	Creación Colectiva	Pete Brooks	Dramaturgy: Pete Brooks. Chilean premiere.
1995	Sangre	Creación Colectiva	Pete Brooks	Playwright: Pete Brooks. Season at the Young Vic Theatre, London. Tour by England and Scotland.
2001	Monólogos de la Vagina	Eve Ensler	Liliana Ross	
2002	Yo Soy Tú	Alex Jones	Liliana Ross	
2004/2005	Brujas	Santiago Moncada	Javiera Contador	
2006	Kuarteto	Santiago Moncada	Tomás Vidiella	
2007	La Casa de Bernarda Alba	Federico García Lorca	Tomás Vidiella	
2008	El Método Grönholm	Jordi Galcerain	Liliana Ross	Tour by the main cities of Chile.
2008	Cristal Tu Corazón	Pedro Lemebel	Rodrigo Muñoz	Tour by the main cities of Chile.
2009	Brujas	Santiago Moncada	Mateo Iribarren	Tour by the main cities of Chile.
2012	En Honor al Mérito (La Investigación Saboteada)	Margarita Musto	Sebastián Barrios	Seasons and Tour: El Galpón Theater, Uruguay.; SHA Theater and Haroldo Conti Memory Center, Argentina.; Gabriela Mistral Cultural Center (GAM), Chile.
2014	El Diccionario	Manuel Calzada Pérez	Manuel Calzada Pérez	Gabriela Mistral Cultural Center (GAM), Chile - Room A2. Manuel Calzada Pérez won the 2014 National Prize for Dramatic Literature in his native Spain for this work.
2015	El Diccionario	Manuel Calzada Pérez	Manuel Calzada Pérez	April season at the Solís Theater in Montevideo, Uruguay.
2015	El Diccionario	Manuel Calzada Pérez	Manuel Calzada Pérez	At the invitation of GAM Theatre: Rerun August 2015 season, Room A2.
2016	El Diccionario	Manuel Calzada Pérez	Manuel Calzada Pérez	DIRAC tour of Italy (Ministry of Foreign Affairs of Chile).: Opening "Quartieri dell'Arte Theater Festival (QdA) Sala MAT in Viterbo".; Napoli: "Castello Maschio Angioino".; Roma: "Teatro di Villa Torlonia".
2017	Operación Cóndor: El Vuelo de Laura	Original idea: Liliana García Sosa. Dramaturgy: Daniella Lillo.	Liliana García Sosa and Ugo Bentivegna	Premiere at the Teatro Marcello di Roma, Italy. The Italian Ministry for Cultural Benefits and Activities (MIBACT) recognized the work as a 2017 Special Project. It was also selected to close L'Estate Romana 2017 by the Municipality of Rome, also as a special recognition. It subsequently participated in the Quartieri dell'Arte Festival in Vitorchiano, Italy.
2018	Operación Cóndor: El Vuelo de Laura	Original idea: Liliana García Sosa. Dramaturgy: Daniella Lillo.	Liliana García Sosa and Ugo Bentivegna	Single performance: El Galpón Theater, Montevideo, Uruguay.
2018	Operación Cóndor: El Vuelo de Laura	Original idea: Liliana García Sosa. Dramaturgy: Daniella Lillo.	Liliana García Sosa and Ugo Bentivegna	Teatro a Mil Festival (FITAM), Santiago de Chile.
2020	El Diccionario	Manuel Calzada Pérez	Manuel Calzada Pérez	Repositioning to celebrate the first decade of the Gabriela Mistral Cultural Center (GAM), selected as "one of the works that have marked its history."
2023	Radioteatro Podcast Mi nombre es Sofia... Marta, Uberlinda, María, Oriana, Raquel...	Arnaldo Madrid	Arnaldo Madrid	"Coup Stories" series by ADN Radio and the Museum of Memory and Human Rights Chile.
2023	Operación Cóndor: El Vuelo de Laura	Original idea: Liliana García Sosa. Dramaturgy: Daniella Lillo.	Liliana García Sosa	Gabriela Mistral Cultural Center (GAM).
2023	Operación Cóndor: El Vuelo de Laura	Original idea: Liliana García Sosa. Dramaturgy: Daniella Lillo.	Liliana García Sosa	Special function in the Aula Magna of the Faculty of Medicine, University of Chile.
2024	Operación Cóndor: El Vuelo de Laura	Original idea: Liliana García Sosa. Dramaturgy: Daniella Lillo.	Liliana García Sosa	Juan XXIII Park Amphitheater-Ñuñoa Cultural Corporation.
2024	Operación Cóndor: El Vuelo de Laura	Original idea: Liliana García Sosa. Dramaturgy: Daniella Lillo.	Liliana García Sosa	International Tour "El Galpón Theater" Montevideo, Uruguay.
2024	Operación Cóndor: El Vuelo de Laura	Original idea: Liliana García Sosa. Dramaturgy: Daniella Lillo.	Liliana García Sosa	International Tour, "El Galpón Theater" Montevideo, Uruguay and "Payró Theater" Buenos Aires, Argentina.
2024	Operación Cóndor: El Vuelo de Laura	Original idea: Liliana García Sosa. Dramaturgy: Daniella Lillo.	Liliana García Sosa	35th edition of the Puerto Montt International Theatre Seasons

== Filmography ==
Film
Year	Film	Director
1990	La teleserie errante	Raúl Ruiz
1991	El Infierno de Dante (cantos X to XV)	Raúl Ruiz
1996	Mi último hombre	Tatiana Gaviola
1998	Tuve un sueño contigo	Gonzalo Justiniano
1999	El viñedo	Esteban Schroeder
2003	El baño	Gregory Cohen
2007	Mi corazón en Chile	Jörg Grünler
2011	Santiago Violenta	Ernesto Díaz Espinoza
2012	Gloria	Sebastián Lelio
