= Parque del Recuerdo (Chile) =

Cemeteries in Santiago, Chile

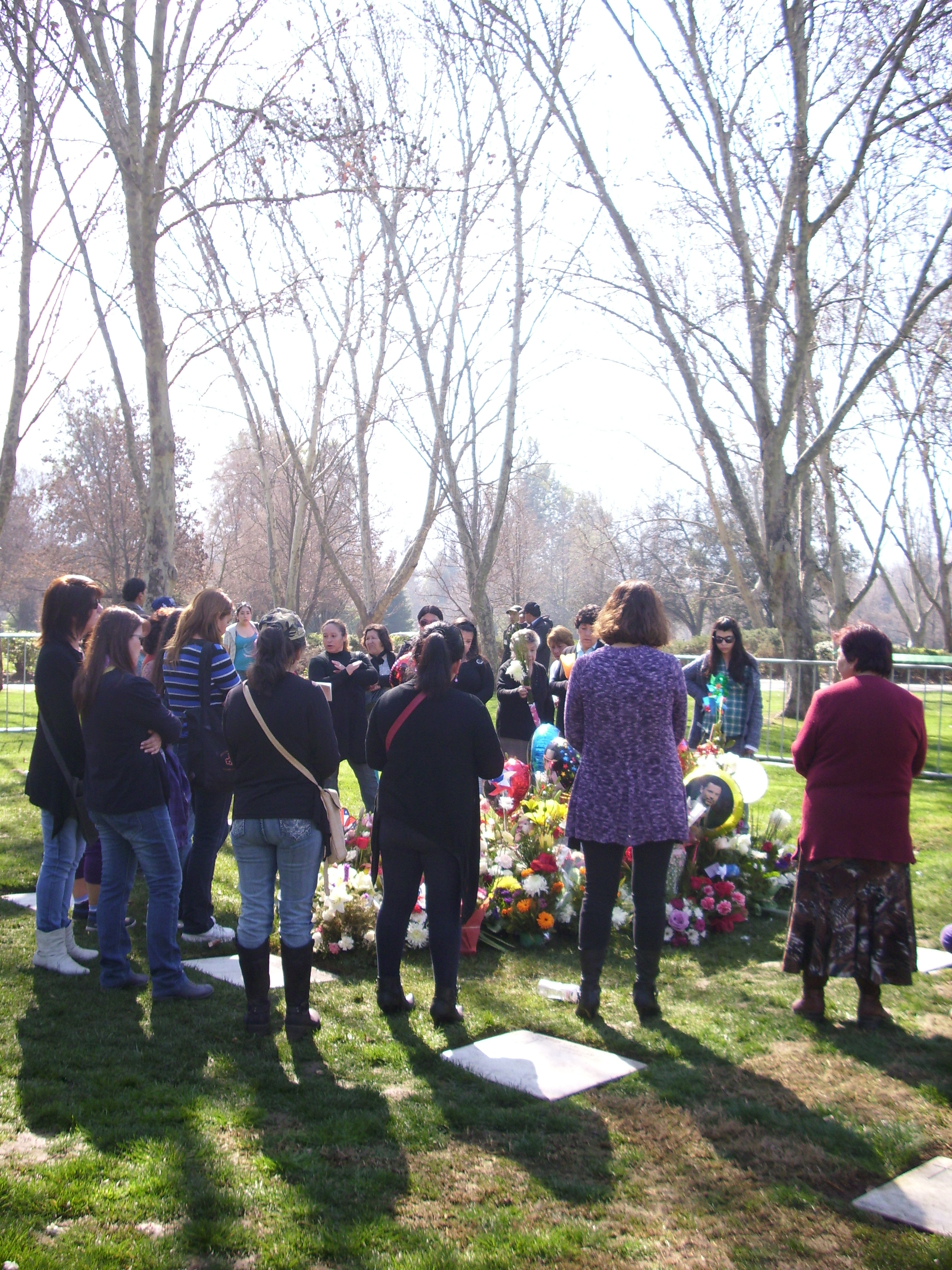
Commemoration of the first anniversary of the death of television presenter Felipe Camiroaga at Parque del Recuerdo Américo Vespucio

Parque del Recuerdo (Spanish: Memory Park) is a group of four cemetery parks located in Santiago, Chile.

== Parque del Recuerdo Américo Vespucio ==
Opened in 1980, Parque del Recuerdo Américo Vespucio is located in the commune of Huechuraba, in the northern sector of the city of Santiago. It was the first cemetery of its kind in the country. It occupies 59 hectares and has a cinerary.

=== People interred ===
- Carlos "Chicho" Azúa (c. 1938–2009), actor and comedian
- Juan Azúa (1938–2006), conductor
- Gonzalo Bertrán (1945–2001), television director
- José Alejandro Bernales (1949–2008), director of the Carabineros de Chile from 2005 to 2008
- Andrés Bobe (1962–1994), founder of the rock band La Ley
- Eduardo Bonvallet (1955–2015), footballer, coach, and sports commentator
- Roberto Bruce (1979–2011), television journalist
- Felipe Camiroaga (1966–2011), television presenter
- Patricio Carvajal (1916–1994), vice admiral and minister of the military dictatorship
- Carlo de Gavardo, racing driver and motorcyclist
- Carolina Fadic (1974–2002), actress and television presenter
- Néstor Isella (1937–2015), footballer, coach, and sports commentator
- Ronald Kay (1941–2017), poet, theorist, and visual artist
- Gustavo Leigh (1920–1999), general and commander-in-chief of the Chilean Air Force, part of the Government Junta
- Bernardo Leighton (1909–1995), lawyer and politician
- Sergio Livingstone (1920–2012), footballer and sports commentator
- Raúl Matas (1921–2004), journalist and radio and television presenter
- Fernando Matthei (1925–2017), general and commander-in-chief of the Chilean Air Force, part of the Government Junta
- César Mendoza (1918–1996), Olympic medalist and general director of the Carabineros, part of the Government Junta
- José Ricardo Morales (1915–2016), Spanish-Chilean writer
- Hernán Olguín (1949–1987), television journalist
- Myriam Palacios (1936–2013), actress and comedian
- Matilde Pérez (1916–2014), painter and sculptor, pioneer of kinetic art in Chile
- Fernando Riera (1920–2010), footballer and coach
- Andrés Rillón (1929–2017), lawyer, actor, director, and comedian
- Peter Rock (1945–2016), Austrian-Chilean musician
- Ricarte Soto (1952–2013), radio and television journalist
- Gabriel Valdés (1919–2011), lawyer, diplomat, academic, and politician
- Luis Vitale (1927–2010), Argentine-Chilean historian and intellectual
- Sonia Viveros (1949–2003), actress
- Raimundo Tupper (1969–1995), footballer
- Adolfo Zaldívar (1943–2013), politician, lawyer, and professor
- Margot Honecker (1927–2016), East German politician and wife of leader Erich Honecker
- Eugenio Cruz Vargas (1923–2014), painter and poet
- Rodolfo Opazo Bernales (1935–2019), painter and sculptor
- Joaquín Marcó Figueroa (1892–1956), former superintendent of the Casa de Moneda de Chile, and author
- Sebastián Piñera (1949–2024), businessman and politician, former president of Chile

== Parque del Recuerdo Santa Clara ==
Parque del Recuerdo Santa Clara, also called Américo Vespucio II, is an extension of the previous park, located at the back by Santa Clara Avenue. It occupies approximately 25 hectares and is still in its construction phase.

== Parque del Recuerdo Cordillera ==
Parque del Recuerdo Cordillera is located in the commune of La Florida, close to the Andean foothills. It was opened in 1998 and occupies 69 hectares.

=== Persons interred ===
- Roberto Viking Valdés (1950–2002), singer
- Paul Schäfer, German immigrant leader and convicted sex offender

== Parque del Recuerdo Padre Hurtado ==
Parque del Recuerdo Padre Hurtado, also known as Parque del Recuerdo Malloco, is located in the commune of Peñaflor, in the peripheral sector of Santiago. It is surrounded by a rural and natural environment. It was opened in 1998 and occupies 35 hectares.

== In popular culture ==
The episode "El funeral de Tulio" of the children's TV series 31 Minutos was filmed in the Parque del Recuerdo Cordillera cemetery.
