= El amor está de moda =

- Title card
- Created by: Cassiano Gabus Mendes
- Based on: Ti Ti Ti (1985)
- Written by: Jorge Ramírez; Nadya Ramírez; Alfredo Rates
- Directed by: Ricardo Vicuña
- Starring: Fernando Kliche; Roberto Poblete; Liliana García; Katty Kowaleczko; Adriana Vacarezza; Luciano Cruz-Coke; Cristian de la Fuente; Claudia Conserva
- Opening theme: "¿Qué me pasa contigo?" by Aline Kuppenheim
- Country of origin: Chile
- Original language: Spanish
- No. of episodes: 85

Production
- Producer: Nené Aguirre
- Production location: Santiago
- Camera setup: Single camera
- Running time: 60-110 minutes
- Production company: Corporación de televisión de la Pontificia Universidad Católica de Chile

Original release
- Network: Canal 13
- Release: March 13 – July 21, 1995

Related
- Top Secret; Amor a domicilio

El amor está de moda (Love is in Fashion) is a 1995 Chilean telenovela produced and broadcast by Canal 13, based on the Brazilian telenovela Ti Ti Ti created by Cassiano Gabus Mendes. It is directed by Ricardo Vicuña.

== Cast ==
- Roberto Poblete as Aristóteles Sepúlveda / "Vittorio Valentini".
- Fernando Kliche as Andrés Correa / "Jack Volteare".
- Esperanza Silva as Susana Acevedo.
- Liliana García as Jacqueline.
- Katty Kowaleczko as Claudia.
- Aline Küppenheim as Valeria Correa.
- Claudia Conserva as Gabriela "Gaby".
- Cristián de la Fuente as Lucas Correa.
- Luciano Cruz-Coke as Juan Pablo Sepúlveda.
- Adriana Vacarezza as Carmen Cáceres.
- Gloria Münchmeyer as Cecilia Correa.
- Patricia Guzmán as Julia Correa.
- Walter Kliche as Hugo Cáceres.
- Sandra Solimano as Sonia.
- Paulina Urrutia as Soledad.
- Boris Quercia as Domingo.
- Andrea Freund as Catalina Andrade.
- Guido Vecchiola as Jorge.
- Marcela Osorio as Solange.
- Alfredo Castro as Leonardo "León" Soto.
- Verónica Moraga as Javiera.
- Felipe Castro as Bob.
- Felipe Armas as Pancho.
- Francisco López as Alex Correa.
- Luz Croxatto as Florencia.
- Gabriela Hernández como Leonor.
- Paola Camaggi como Patricia.
- Alex Zisis como Hernán Mujica.
- Felipe Viel como Antonio.
- Carlos Díaz as Samuel.
- Pía Salas as Amanda.
- Gloria Laso as María Luisa Valdivieso.
- José Secall as Agustín Andrade.
- María Elena Duvauchelle as Soraya.
- Patricio Achurra as Gonzalo.
- Carmen Barros as Aurora Zañartu.
- Sonia Viveros as Ruth.
- Francisca Merino as Marcela.
- Teresita Reyes as Lucía.
- Myriam Palacios as Rosalía.
- Hernan Hevia as Caco.
- Juan Falcón as Adriano.
- Alicia Pedroso as Nelly.
- Verónica González as Camila.
- Constanza Piwonka as Rocío.
- Pedro Vicuña as Pretendiente de Soledad.
- Orietta Grendi as Myriam.
- Cristián García-Huidobro as the Animator fashion competition.
- Ramón Núñez
- Archibaldo Larenas as Santiago Valdivia.

== Soundtrack ==
1. Que me pasa Contigo - Aline Kuppenheim (Opening theme)
2. Pequeño Rayo de Sol - Alberto Plaza
3. Coche Viejo - Paralamas
4. Mas Fuerte de lo que Pensaba - Aleks Syntek
5. Cariño Mio - Soledad Guerrero
6. Temporal de amor - Leandro y Leonardo
7. Golpes y besos - Leandro y Leonardo
8. Mejor no hablemos de amor - Enanitos Verdes
9. Vida - La Mafia
10. Locos por Amor - Francesc Picas
11. Cómo voy a renunciar a tí - Cecilia Echenique
12. Subire - Cinema
13. Mucha Experiencia - Los Pericos
14. Canción por un encuentro - Alberto Plaza
15. Volver a nacer - Chayanne
16. Runaway - Los Pericos
17. Angel Descarriado - Cinema
18. Parate y Mira - Los Pericos
19. El amor esta de moda - Aline Kuppenheim
20. La vida - La Sociedad
21. Amor por bandera - Francesc Picas

== Other versions ==
- (Brazil) Ti Ti Ti - a Brazilian telenovela produced and aired by Rede Globo in 1995.
- (Brazil) Ti Ti Ti - remake of the 1985 Brazilian telenovela also produced and aired by Rede Globo in 2010.
