= Tomás Vidiella =

Chilean actor (1937–2021)

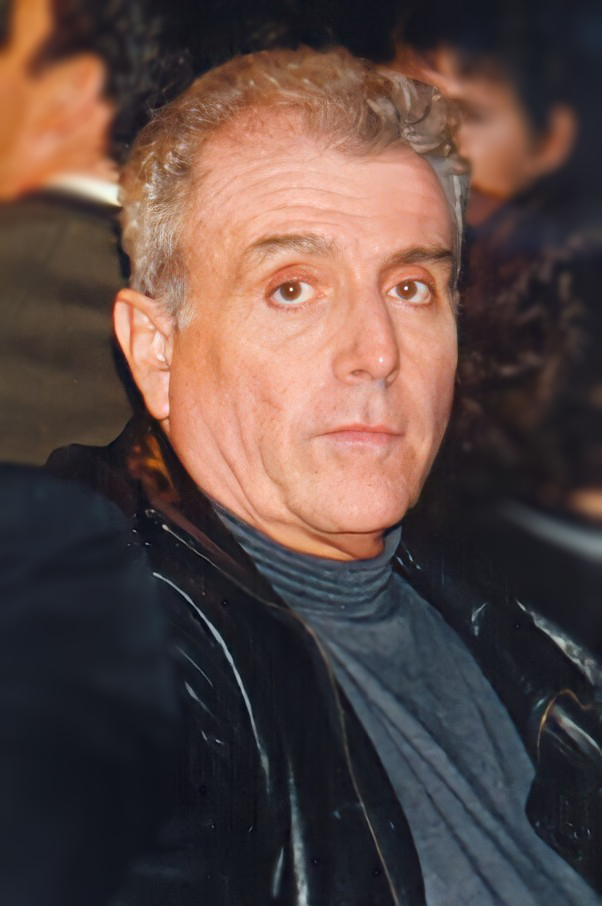
- Vidiella in 2000
- Born: Tomás Humberto Eduardo Vidiella Baigorrotegui; 26 October 1937; Santiago, Chile
- Died: 10 March 2021 (aged 83); Santiago, Chile
- Occupations: Actor, director, cultural manager
- Years active: 1958–2021

Tomás Humberto Eduardo Vidiella Baigorrotegui (26 October 1937 – 10 March 2021) was a Chilean actor, theatre director, and cultural manager.

He is notable for his long and broad artistic career. He was the founder of the theater companies El Túnel (1970), Hollywood (1976), Anfiteatro Lo Castillo (1980) and El Conventillo (1983), along with his sister Eliana Vidiella. He is considered the father of café-concert in Chile, which he helped forge and develop with remarkable success in the 1970s and 1980s.

In theater he acted and collaborated in various and successful plays, with national and international tours, such as Cabaret Bijoux and Viejos de mierda. While on television he is recognized for his roles of character and interpretive strength, in titles such as La torre 10, La villa, Amor a domicilio, Fuera de control, Sabor a ti and his magisterial antagonistic role in Montecristo. In cinema he stand out in films such as El nominado (2003), Cachimba (2004) and La memoria de mi padre (2017)

== Biography ==
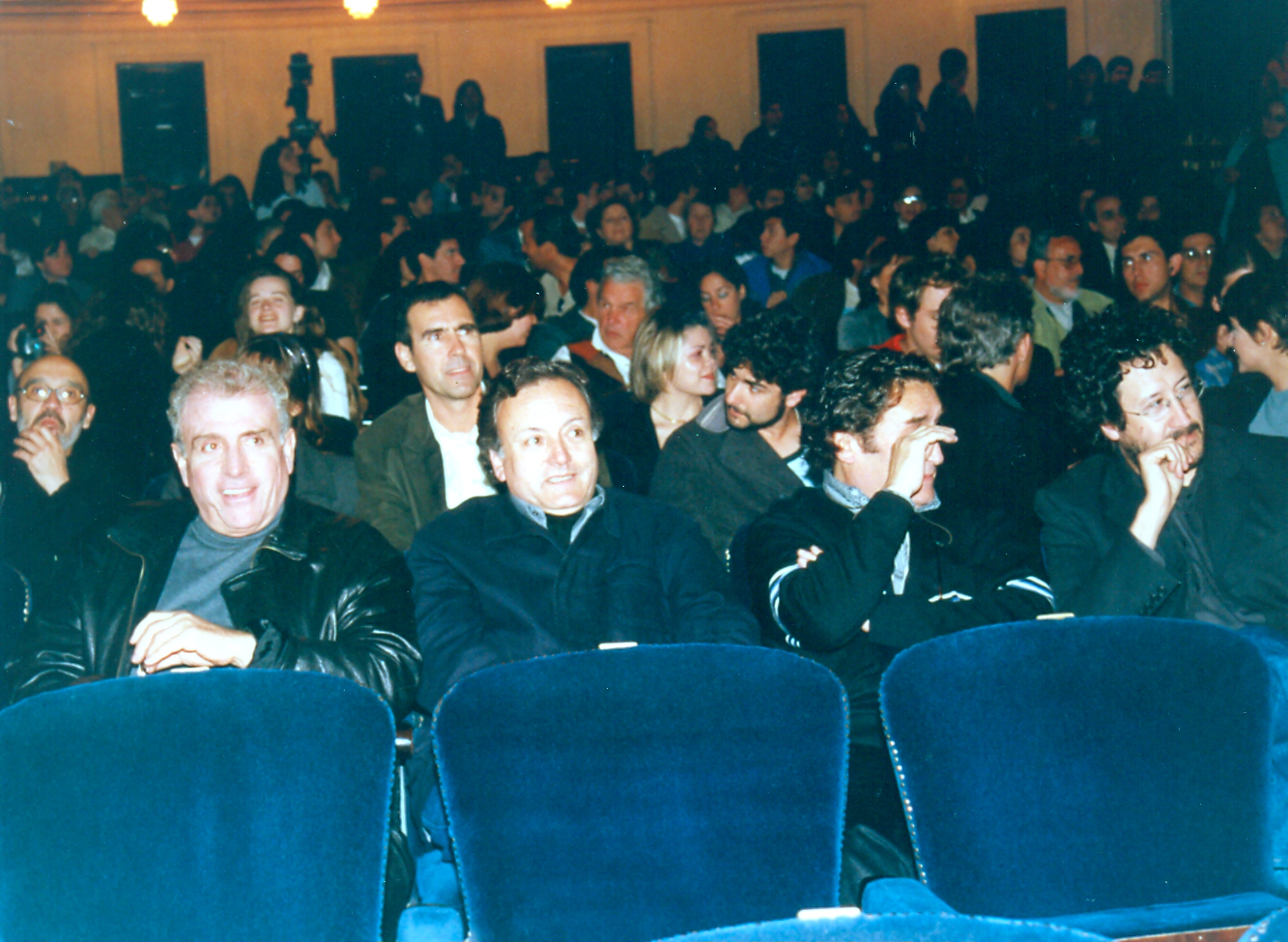
Vidiella alongside fellow actors Patricio Achurra, Rodolfo Bravo, Willy Semler, Aldo Parodi, Cristián Campos, Romeo Singer, among others, at the 2000 Viña del Mar International Film Festival.

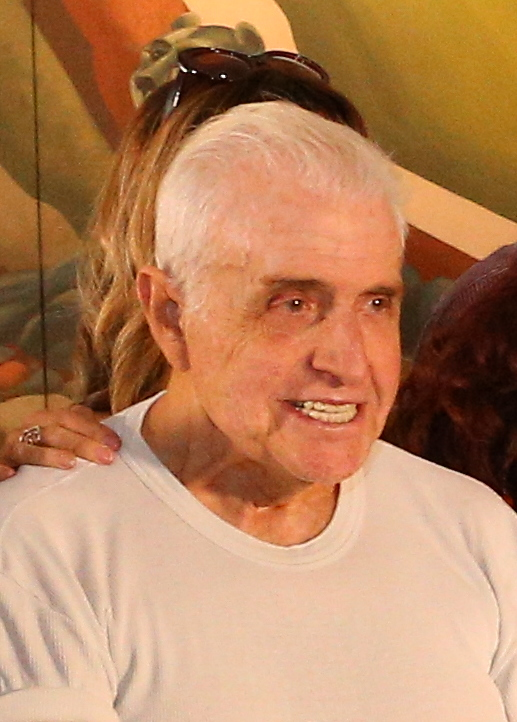
Vidiella in January 2020

He was the son of Tomás Vidiella Sánchez and Lina Elvira Baigorrotegui de la Barra. He had a sister named Eliana Vidiella, also an actress. In his childhood he lived in a wealthy family in the Lastarria neighborhood of Santiago. He studied at the San José Patrocinio and later at the Barros Arana National Boarding School. Later, he performed at the School of Theater at the University of Chile. Of his generation, 36 students entered the theater and only four graduated, among them Víctor Jara, Alejandro Sieveking, Luis Barahona and him. Later, with Víctor Jara and Alejandro Sieveking they made a tour of Latin America and when they were in Mexico, after six months, they fought before leaving for Spain. So Vidiella returned to Chile, sold her clothes and his record player, and left for New York with $200.

Upon his return he soon stood out, especially as a creative, manager and entrepreneur of the show. He brought to Chile the concept of the café concert, which he developed with total success. And he opened nine theaters, while still performing. His sister, Eliana, supported him in the administration of his premises, reaching great success in the 70s and 80s. The first show of this genre in Chile was orchestrated by Vidiella together with the actors Alejandro Cohen and Pina Brandt, thus premiering Hagamos el amor in 1971 at the El Túnel Theater.

Already in 1961 the interpreter had his first appearance in the Chilean fotonovela, in the magazine Cine Amor in El que volvió, directed by Eduardo Naveda. Vidiella first appeared on a cover in 1962 with El Milagro.

His El Túnel Theater company was the first to premiere a work by Isabel Allende in 1973, with Balada de medio pelo and with the performance of Valentín Trujillo. In 1975, Vidiella made her debut at the Chilean-French Institute of Culture with the play Los siete espejos, written by Allende and Francisco Flores del Campo.

In 1976, he played the second transforming character in the Chilean theater, after Travesti por mi abuela (1971) by Eduardo Soto, playing "Lulú" in the play Cabaret Bijoux, which became a success and over time came to be presented in Valparaíso, Osorno, Concepción, Arica, Puerto Montt and Valdivia. Famous actresses such as Sonia Viveros and Silvia Piñeiro took part in it.

On television, he was one of the first gallants of the Dramatic Area of National Television of Chile hired by the Executive Director, Sonia Fuchs, thus standing out in telenovelas such as La torre 10, along with Sonia Viveros and young Javiera Parada, and in La Villa. He also contributed his experience as a mature actor in several Channel 13 productions in the 1990s, with titles such as Amor a domicilio, Fuera de control, Sabor a tí, among others. In 2006 he masterfully antagonized the telenovela Montecristo, by Megavisión.

As a cultural manager and producer, he stands out as founder of the theaters El Túnel (1970), Hollywood (1976), Anfiteatro Lo Castillo (1980) and El Conventillo (1983). He has acted and directed in Mrs. Warren's Profession (2002) and Los Chinos (2002).

With the work Parecido a la felicidad, he toured La Havana, Caracas, Bogotá, Guatemala, San José and Mexico City. He has also toured in Buenos Aires with Las Sirvientas, Fausto Shock and Los Chinos.

In 2001, Vidiella was awarded the Award of the Association of Journalists of Shows, Art and Culture of Chile (APES) for Best Theater Actor in 2001 for Largo viaje del día hacia la noche.

Regarding cinema, his performances in El nominado (2003), Cachimba (2004) and La memoria de mi padre (2017) stand out. In the latter, along with Jaime McManus, directed by Rodrigo Bacigalupe. His performance was the winner of the Best Actor Award at the Santiago International Film Festival.

In the theater field, he stood out in his last years mainly with the play Viejos de Mierda (2015–2021), a delirious comedy written and directed by Rodrigo Bastidas, where Vidiella shared roles with comedian Coco Legrand and Jaime Vadell.

In 2018, he received a tribute from the Actors Union of Chile to his career. On 26 February 2021, two weeks before his death, ChileActores awarded him with a Caleuche Lifetime Achievement Award for his exceptional work in the performing arts. The actor said that: “I have made a career out of love, because theater is very important for the life of human beings”.

=== Death ===
On 5 March 2021, Vidiella was hospitalized at the UC Christus Clinic after contracting COVID-19, just days after it was confirmed that Cristián Campos, his co-star in the play Orquesta de Señoritas, also tested positive. In turn, all the rest of team members also underwent a preventive quarantine including stars such as Luis Gnecco, Willy Semler and Mauricio Pesutic.

On 9 March, his friend and actor, Jaime Vadell, indicated that Vidiella was in good health, and they even communicated by phone on 6 March. Despite this, the actor remained connected to a mechanical ventilator since 7 March, finally dying three days later of complications related to COVID-19 during the COVID-19 pandemic in Chile.

== Filmography ==
=== Films ===
Year	Produccion	Character	Director
1973	Antonio		Claudio Guzmán
1998	El entusiasmo	Canoso	Ricardo Larraín
2003	The Chosen One	Mañungo Eyzaguirre	Ignacio Argiró & Gabriel López
2004	Cachimba	Marcel	Silvio Caiozzi
2009	Teresa	Antonio Balmaceda	Tatiana Gaviola
2011	Dios me libre	Óscar Cifuentes	Martín Duplaquet
2012	Educación Física	Padre de Exequiel	Pablo Cerda
2013	Oranch		Pablo Lagos
2015	Sendero	Gustavo	Lucio A. Rojas
2017	La memoria de mi padre	Jesús	Rodrigo Bacigalupe
2021	Un loco matrimonio en cuarentena	Hugo Espíndola	Rodrigo Bastidas

=== Telenovelas ===
Year	Telenovela	Role	Channel	Type
1982	De cara al mañana	Ignacio Martínez	TVN	Papel principal
1984	La represa	Fernando Varas	TVN	Reparto
1984	La torre 10	Hernán Ugalde	TVN	Papel principal
1986	La dama del balcón	Ruperto	TVN	Reparto
1986	La Villa	Ignacio Montes / Héctor Pereira	TVN	Papel principal
1988	Vivir así	Aldo Francino	Canal 13	Invitado
1990	El milagro de vivir	Aníbal Gómez / Roberto Martínez	TVN	Antagonista
1994	Top secret	Horacio Ragner	Canal 13	Antagonista
1995	Amor a domicilio	Gaspar Encina	Canal 13	Papel co-principal
1996	Marrón Glacé, el regreso	Amador Monarde	Canal 13	Antagonista
1997	Eclipse de luna	Ómar Riva	Canal 13	Papel co-principal
1998	Amándote	Vicente Trosciani	Canal 13	Antagonista
1999	Fuera de control	Aarón Hurtado "El viejo Aarón"	Canal 13	Papel co-principal
2000	Sabor a ti	Refugio Sarmiento	Canal 13	Papel principal
2001	Piel canela	Galo Casagrande	Canal 13	Reparto
2006	Montecristo	Alberto Lombardo	Mega	Antagonista
2008	Camera Café	Gregorio Hormazábal	Mega	Antagonista
2008	Lola	Alfonso Salamanca	Canal 13	Reparto
2009	Corazón rebelde	Sergio Bustamante	Canal 13	Antagonista
2017	Tranquilo papá	Leopoldo Sánchez	Mega	Invitado

=== TV Series ===
Year	Produccion	Role	Channel
1978	El show de Tomás Vidiella	Él mismo	Canal 9 U
1980	Tres veces amor	Dr. Ismael Flores	TVN
1996	Amor a domicilio, la comedia	Gaspar Encina	Canal 13
2003	La vida es una lotería	Gregorio	TVN
2004	Tiempo final: en tiempo real	Héctor	TVN
2010	Cartas de mujer	Luis Alberto	Chilevisión
2015	Fabulosas Flores	Leopoldo Ramos	La Red
2017	Lo que callamos las mujeres		Chilevisión
