= The King of San Gregorio =

- DVD release poster
- Directed by: Alfonso Gazitúa
- Written by: Alfonso Gazitúa; Christian Morales
- Produced by: Magdalena Gissi; Claudia Nelson; Christian Olguín
- Starring: Pedro Vargas; María José Parga
- Cinematography: Alvaro Cortés
- Edited by: Soledad Salfate
- Music by: Edgardo Cantón
- Production company: Allegro Films
- Release date: October 26, 2006 (Chile)
- Running time: 90 minutes
- Country: Chile
- Language: Spanish

The King of San Gregorio (Spanish: El rey de San Gregorio) is a 2006 Chilean romantic drama film directed by Alfonso Gazitúa (in his directorial debut) and written by Gazitúa & Christian Morales. Starring Pedro Vargas and María José Parga. It is about the love story between two people with mental and physical disabilities in the town of San Gregorio, Chile.

== Synopsis ==
Pedro, a thirty something resident of San Gregorio, who struggles to overcome physical and slight mental impairments, and Cati, a girl with a severe intellectual disability, whom Pedro refers to, dotingly, as his "princess". Together, the two must counter opposition to the relationship posed by Pedro's mother, María, and Cati's sister – who worries openly about the role that Cati's erogenous arousal will play in the romance. Through it all, however, Pedro vows to make the relationship work no matter the cost.

== Cast ==
The actors participating in this film are:

- Pedro Vargas as Pedro
- María José Pargas as Cati
- Gloria Münchmeyer as Pedro's mother
- Andrés Rillón as Juan
- José Sosa as Collective driver
- Giselle Demelchiore as Marta
- José Miguel Jiménez as Rodrigo

== Release ==
The King of San Gregorio premiered on October 26, 2006, in Chilean theaters.

== Accolades ==
Year	Award / Festival	Category	Recipient	Result	Ref.
2006	Viña del Mar International Film Festival	Best Leading Actress	María José Pargas	Won	
2007	Milan African, Asian and Latin American Film Festival	Best Film	The King of San Gregorio	Won	
2007	Pedro Sienna Awards	Best Director	Alfonso Gazitúa	Nominated	
2007	Pedro Sienna Awards	Best Actress	María José Parga	Nominated	
2007	Pedro Sienna Awards	Best Actor	Pedro Vargas	Nominated	
2007	Pedro Sienna Awards	Best Costume Design	Alejandro Mora	Nominated	
2007	Pedro Sienna Awards	Best Original Music	Edgardo Cantón	Nominated	
2007	Pedro Sienna Awards	Best Sound Design	Miguel Hormazábal	Nominated	
2007	Pedro Sienna Awards	Best Makeup	Paula Yolin	Nominated	
