= Anita Alvarado =

Chilean prostitute, businesswoman, reality TV personality

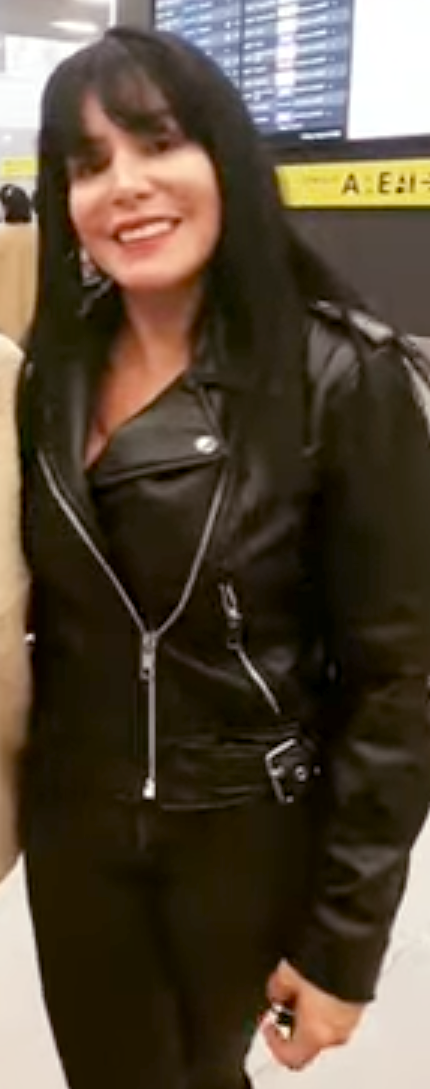
- In a 2022 video
- Born: Anita Ester Alvarado Muñoz; 25 December 1972 (age 53); Santiago de Chile, Chile
- Other names: The Chilean Geisha
- Occupations: Prostitute, businesswoman, reality TV personality
- Known for: Wife of Japanese embezzler Yuji Chida

Anita Ester Alvarado Muñoz (born 25 December 1972), better known as "The Chilean Geisha", she is known for her ex-husband's involvement in one of the largest financial frauds carried out in Japan, where she worked as a prostitute. On her return to Chile, she pursued a career in show business, as an actress and singer, and being a frequent guest on reality television programmes.

== Biography ==
=== Early years ===
Alvarado was born in Santiago in 1972, the fourth daughter out of eight. During her childhood she lived in the Las Vertientes neighbourhood of El Bosque.

In 1989 she worked in a shoe factory, and had a relationship with a 40-year-old man, from which his first daughter, Angie, was born, on 25 May 1990. Alvarado also worked as an assistant to a seamstress in San Bernardo and in a restaurant in the Mapocho neighbourhood. Her daughter Angie suffered a respiratory infection during her first few months. To support her daughter, Alvarado decided to work in the brothels in the Chilean capital, including the Charlie Bar on calle José Miguel de la Barra and the Black Cat. She later had her second child, a son named Felipe.

=== Emigration to Japan ===
In search of better opportunities, Alvarado emigrated to Nagoya, Japan in December 1990. In Japan she spent two years engaging in prostitution in different cities. She returned to Chile for a month to see her family, returning to Japan on 7 December 1992.

In 1996 at the Asamushi Onsen in northern Japan, she met Tsukasa Tanesawa, whom she has described as "her only love." Alvarado lived in the Tanesawa family home and was introduced as his future wife. However, the need to see her children made her travel to Chile for a month, financed by a businessman named "Kudo" who gave her $20,000. She travelled through Mexico, where she had a breast enlargement, but had complications and upon her return to Japan had the implants removed.

Alvarado met Yuji Chida, who was an executive and accountant of the Aomori housing cooperative, in 1997 in a ladies' bar. On their first date Chida gave her a briefcase containing $100,000. She maintained a relationship with the executive only to improve her financial situation and was in love with Tanesawa.

=== Return to Chile and rise to fame ===
After suffering domestic violence from her boyfriend, Alvarado decided to return to Chile, but Chida followed to ask her to marry him. Alvarado accepted due to family pressure. Chida and Alvarado married on 2 August 1997 in La Cisterna. Initially they lived together in La Florida, but after a few months Chida decided to return to Japan and visit Anita every three months. Alvarado started business in Chile, a bar called Delirio Caribeño, where she met the father of two of her children. She also opened a medical centre and a real estate company. She had a mansion built in the exclusive Chicureo sector of the Santiago Metropolitan Region. The mansion was valued at more than 1.2 million euros and was inspired by Scarlett O'Hara's house in the movie Gone with the Wind.

In December 2001, Chida was arrested in Tokyo for defrauding the Aomori cooperative of US $11 million, a crime that Alvarado was allegedly unaware of. Because of this Alvarado became a celebrity both in Japan and in her native Chile, being interviewed in magazines and television programs. At this time she was given the nickname "Chilean geisha" by the press. Alvarado played a small role as a prostitute named Solange in the Chilean film Los Debutantes in March 2002, during which she performed fellatio. On 29 July she released her autobiography Me llamo Anita Alvarado (My Name Is Anita Alvarado), and appeared half-naked on the cover. Alvarado released an album Anita, la geisha chilena (Anita, the Chilean geisha) in November 2002. She also marketed a wine, Doña Geisha, in the same month.

In August 2002, her mansion was put up for auction to try and recover part of the money embezzled by Chida, and she vacated the property in October. Other buildings owned by Alvarado in Santiago suffered a similar fate, such as the clinic and the bar "Delirio Caribeño". Chida filed for divorce from Alvarado but she refused.

=== Other television appearances ===
In 2007, Alvarado returned to controversy after appearing naked on the celebrity reality show The Beautiful People, broadcast by Chilevisión. The same year she travelled to Japan to visit her ex-husband who was incarcerated in Yamagata prison, which was later broadcast in another episode of The Beautiful People. Her oldest daughter, Angie, participated in the TVN reality show Pelotón VIP in 2009, after which she became a regular on reality shows.

In August 2011 Alvarado had her own docureality on the show Primer plano, and in 2012, she participated in the fifth season of the Fiebre de baile dance contest and in the reality show Amazonas, both from Chilevisión.

== Prosecutions ==
Alvarado was accused of sex-trafficking in 2003, the charges were dismissed. In 2005 she was charged with “facilitation and promotion” of prostitution.

== Works ==
- Alvarado, Anita (2002). Me llamo Anita Alvarado [My Name is Anita Alvarado] (in Spanish). Ediciones B. ISBN 978-956-7510-76-4.

== Filmography ==
=== Cinema ===
Movie	Year	Role
Los Debutantes	2003	Solange

=== Television ===
Programme	Year	Channel	Role
The beautiful people	2007	Chilevision	Herself
Primer plano	2011	Chilevision	Herself
Infieles	2012	Chilevision	Miriam (chapter "Chopped Spider")
Fiebre de baile	2012	Chilevision	Herself
Amazonas	2012	Chilevision	Herself

== Discography ==
- Anita Alvarado (2002). Anita, la geisha chilena [Anita, Chilean geisha] (in Spanish). EMI Chile.
