= Gloria Münchmeyer =

Chilean actress

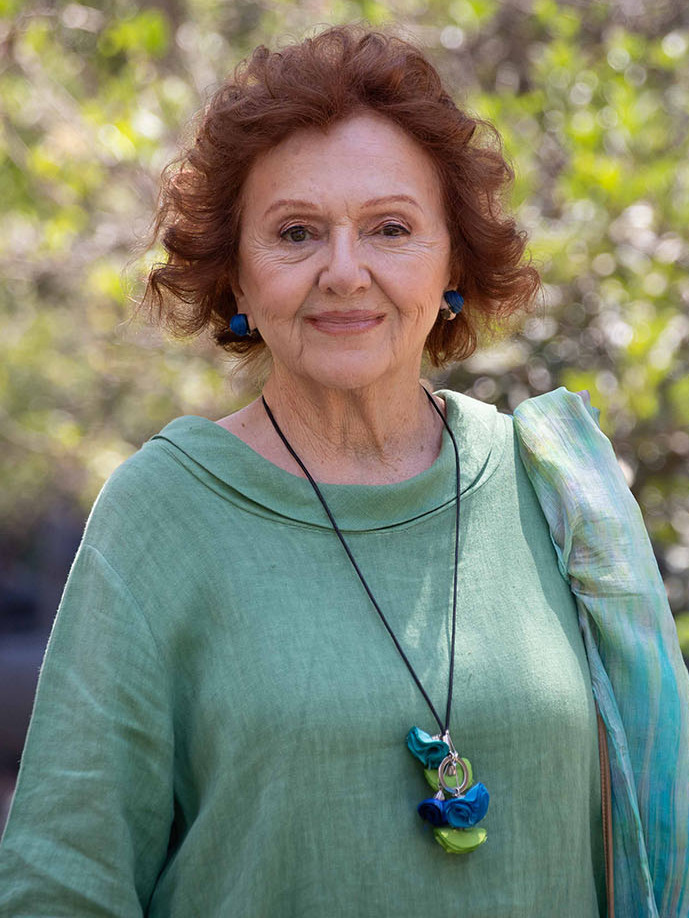
- Münchmeyer in 2024
- Born: María Gloria Münchmeyer Barber; 2 September 1938 (age 87); Santiago de Chile, Chile
- Occupation: Actress

María Gloria Münchmeyer Barber (born September 2, 1938, in Santiago) is a Chilean television, film and theatre actress, known for her roles in some telenovelas like La Madrastra, Marrón Glacé, and others. She was married to actor/comedian Jorge Guerra and mother of actress Catalina Guerra. In 1990, she received the Volpi Cup for her role on The Moon in the Mirror.

== Filmography ==
Soap Opera and television credits
| Year | Title | Role | Notes |
|---|---|---|---|
| 1981 | La Madrastra | Estrella Moran | |
| 1982 | Alguien por Quien Vivir | Silvia Correa | |
| 1983 | La Noche del Cobarde | Paloma | |
| 1984 | Los Títeres | Adriana Godan | |
| 1985 | Matrimonio de Papel | Claudia Robinson | |
| 1986 | Ángel Malo | Stela Álvarez | |
| 1987 | La Invitación | Irene Vilar | |
| 1988 | Semidiós | Paloma Del Rio | |
| 1988 | Matilde Dedos Verdes | Laura Olea | |
| 1990 | ¿Te Conté? | Elena Valdivieso | |
| 1991 | Villa Nápoli | Claudia Huidobro | |
| 1992 | El Palo al Gato | Cristina Bustamante | |
| 1993 | Marrón Glacé | Cló Anderson | |
| 1994 | Champaña | Olivia Carter | |
| 1995 | El amor está de moda | Cecilia Correa | |
| 1996 | Marrón Glacé, el Regreso | Cló Anderson | |
| 1997 | Eclipse de Luna | Ana Celis | |
| 1998 | Amándote | Victoria Archer | |
| 1999 | Fuera de Control | Diva Oyarzún | |
| 2000 | Sabor a Ti | Sol Mora | |
| 2001 | Piel canela | Vida Suárez | |
| 2002 | Purasangre | Violeta Salazar | |
| 2003 | Pecadores | Úrsula Pérez | |
| 2004 | Destinos Cruzados | Esther Dickinson | |
| 2005 | Versus | Nélida Rojo | |
| 2006 | Floribella | Greta Fassbinder | |
| 2006 | The King of San Gregorio | Pedro's Mother | |
| 2007 | Fortunato | Aurora Valdivieso | |
| 2007 | Tres Son Multitud | Beatriz Rozas | |
| 2009 | Cuenta Conmigo | Eugenia Lazcano | |
| 2011 | El Laberinto de Alicia | Hellen Harper | |
| 2012 | Reserva de Familia | Estela Solar de Arce | |
| 2013 | Dos por uno | Carlota Pinto | |
| 2014 | Chipe Libre | Violeta Riesco | |
| 2015 | Matriarcas | Isabelle Standford | |
| 2015 | Mis Años Dorados | Chichi Fernandez | |
| 2019 | Gemelas | Lolo Beltrán | |
| 2020 | Los Carcamales | Estela Jáuregui | |
| 2021 | 42 Days of Darkness | Berta Del Rio | |

=== Films ===
- La casa en que vivimos (1970)
- Voto más fusil (1971)
- State of Siege (1972)
- Julio Comienza en Julio (1977)
- Cualquier día (1980)
- Los deseos concebidos (1982)
- Imagen latente (1988)
- The Moon in the Mirror (1990) - Lucrecia
- ¡Viva el novio! (1990)
- Los agentes de la KGB también se enamoran (1992)
- Cielo ciego (1998)
- El desquite (1999)
- Coronación (2000)
- Padre nuestro (2005)
- The King of San Gregorio (2005)
- Pecados, confesiones de mujer (2006)
- El regalo (2008) - Lucy
- The Dancer and the Thief (2009)
- El bosque de Karadima (2015)
- Viejos amores (2016)
- Calzones rotos (2018)
- Perra vida (2020)
- El Conde (2023)

== Theatre ==
- Los Deseos Concebidos (1982)
- Cielo Ciego (1998)
- Pecados, Confesiones de una Mujer (2005)

== Series ==
- Soltero a la Medida (1994)
- Tres son Multitud (2007) - Beatriz Rosas
- Los 80 (2010) - Leonor
