= Adriana Vacarezza =

Chilean actress (born 1961)

- Born: Adriana Vacarezza Etcheverry; October 8, 1961 (age 64); Antofagasta, Chile
- Education: Pontifical Catholic University of Chile
- Occupation: Actress

Adriana Vacarezza Etcheverry (born October 8, 1961, in Antofagasta) is a Chilean television and theatre actress. She is the sister of the television presenter Marcela Vacarezza.

Adriana studied theatre at Escuela de la Pontificia Universidad Católica de Chile. She made her TV acting debut in the telenovela "Los Títeres" (lit: The Puppets) directed by Oscar Rodríguez. In 2007 she joined Chilevisión.

== Filmography ==
=== Telenovelas ===
- Los titeres (Canal 13 – 1984) as Márgara
- La Trampa (Canal 13 – 1985) as Maria Blanca "Mariblanca" Madrid
- Secreto de Familia (Canal 13 – 1986) as Paz Barca
- La invitacion (Canal 13 – 1987) as Ruth
- Semidios (Canal 13 – 1988) es Jeannette
- Bravo (Canal 13 – 1989) as Sussy
- Ellas por Ellas (Canal 13 – 1991) as Marlene
- Trampas y Caretas (TVN – 1992) as María Fernanda
- Fácil de amar (Canal 13 – 1992) as Verónica
- Ámame (TVN – 1993) as Fernanda Rivarosa
- Rojo y Miel (TVN – 1994) as Carla
- El amor está de moda (Canal 13 – 1995) as Carmen
- Marrón Glacé, el regreso (Canal 13 – 1996) as Susana
- Oro Verde (TVN – 1997) as Bernardita "Berny" Alemparte
- Tic Tac (TVN – 1997) as Calú Barcelona
- Borron y cuenta nueva (TVN – 1998) as Carola Sutíl
- Cerro Alegre (Canal 13 – 1999) as Emilia San Martín
- Machos (Canal 13 – 2003) as Isabel Füller
- Amor en tiempo record (TVN – 2006) as Carmen de Yávar
- Vivir con 10 (CHV – 2007) as Victoria Salazar
- ¿Dónde está Elisa? (TVN – 2009) as Isabel Salazar

== Television series ==
- Ángeles (1988) as Ángela
- Teatro en Canal 13 (canal 13 – 1995 y 1998)
- Las historias de sussy (TVN – 1997) as Ruth
- Mi último hombre (1996) as Valeria (journalist)
- Mi Abuelo mi nana y yo (Sitcom – TVN – 1998) as María Ignacia Luco
- Mea Culpa (TVN – 2002) as Doralisa
- La vida es una loteria (TVN – 2002) as Astrid
- Los Debutantes (2003) as Bernardita
- Los simuladores (Canal 13 – 2005) as Teresa
- Bienvenida Realidad (TVN – 2005) as Madre de Leticia
- Urgencias (serie – MEGA – 2005) as Katty Sandoval
- Teatro en Chilevisión "Playa Luna" (CHV – 2008 y 2010) as Vicky de Pérez-Cotapos
