= Andrés Rillón =

- Born: Andrés Eugenio Rillón Romani; 27 December 1929; Viña del Mar, Chile
- Died: 5 January 2017 (aged 87); Santiago, Chile
- Resting place: Parque del Recuerdo
- Other names: Argos, Artos, Aramis
- Education: University of Chile
- Occupations: Lawyer, actor, film director, comedian
- Spouse: María Elvira Reyes

Andrés Eugenio Rillón Romani (27 December 1929 – 5 January 2017) was a Chilean lawyer, actor, film director, and comedian.

== Lawyer and director of the Electoral Registry ==
Andrés Rillón studied law at several universities, graduating from the University of Chile. In 1963, age 33, he obtained a law degree.

He was director of his country's Electoral Registry (predecessor of the Electoral Service of Chile) from 1965 to 1977, acting in an interim capacity from 1965 to 1968. During his term of office, a constitutional reform was implemented granting suffrage to men and women over 18 years old, regardless of literacy, and modernizing the service through the implementation of computer technologies of the time. He was asked to resign in 1977, during the military regime, after having refused to be director of a government publication.

== Artistic career ==
Rillón studied film at the Pontifical Catholic University of Chile. He served as an actor, film producer and theater director. He was an assistant director at Teatro Ictus.

On television, he joined the cast of the comedy programs La manivela, Jappening con ja (1983–1984 and 2000) – where he gained notoriety for his character "Don Pío", in the sketch "La Oficina" – and Mediomundo (1985–1987 and 1991–1992), where he formed a duo with Julio Jung. He also starred in a series of commercials for Cecinas Winter from 1987 to 1997. In cinema, he starred in the films The King of San Gregorio (2005) and Héroes: el asilo contra la opresión (2014).

He was also a television critic for ten years (1976–1986) for El Mercurio, and a comedic columnist in the magazine Qué Pasa (1972–1973) and the evening newspaper La Segunda. He wrote under the pseudonyms "Argos", "Artos", and "Aramis".

== Personal life and health ==
On 8 December 1957, he married María Elvira Reyes, with whom he had six children.

During his final years, he suffered heart problems. In December 2016, he was admitted to the hospital for a week, and the need for a surgical intervention was evaluated. In an interview with Las Últimas Noticias, Rillón affirmed with his peculiar sense of humor that, "they have to operate on me if funerary festivities do not go ahead." On 5 January 2017, Rillón died at age 87. He was buried in Santiago's Parque del Recuerdo.

== Filmography ==
=== Film ===
Year	Title	Role
2006	The King of San Gregorio	Juan
2014	Héroes: el asilo contra la opresión	Caco

=== TV series ===
Year	Title	Channel	Role
1983–1984	Jappening con ja	TVN	"Don Pío", various characters
1985–1992	Mediomundo	Canal 13	"Don Pío", various characters
1998	Travesía	Megavisión	Panelist

== Publications ==
- Cosas que podrían interesar a más de alguien: una autobiografía (2008)
