= Gonzalo Robles =

Chilean actor

Gonzalo Eduardo Robles García
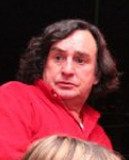
- Born: April 22, 1952 (age 74); Santiago, Chile
- Occupations: Actor, comedian
- Years active: 1979–present

Gonzalo Eduardo Robles García (Santiago, April 22, 1952), is a Chilean film, theater and television actor and comedian.

== Biography ==
Robles studied at Colegio San Ignacio. Later he started a career in Civil Construction at the Pontificia Universidad Católica de Chile, but withdrew to enter the School of Theater at the University of Chile.

He was married to the actress Coca Guazzini with whom he had his son Camilo, later in another relationship he had his children Antonio and Concepción. He is currently married to film director Tatiana Gaviola.

He was a founding member of the Teatro Imagen Company. He has acted in more than 30 theatrical works, among them "The raw, the cooked, the rotten", "The last train", "You called yourself Rosicler", "The kiss of the spider woman", "Pachamama", "Neruda", "A perfectly ridiculous being", "Machísimo", "Delinquent and bipolar", "Our women".

In cinema, Robles has acted in 11 films including: Latent Image, The Magnetic Tree, Stretched out looking at the stars, and The verses of oblivion. On television, he has been part of the film-making and acting team of comedy shows such as Los Eguiguren, De chincol a jote, Jaguar you, Na´que ver con Chile and Mi tío y yo.

Robles has acted in 10 seasons of Teatro en Chilevisión. In TV series: Reporteras, Los Cárcamo, Infieles, Mis años Grossos and the highly praised Los 80. He has participated in more than 18 TV soap productions, among which are: La Madrastra, La Señora, Las Herederas, Rojo y Miel, Playa Salvaje, Vivir con 10, Mala Conducta, El amor lo manejo yo, Matriarcas and Un diablo con ángel.

In 2020, he revived the show Los Eguiguren en pandemia along with fellow actors from the 80s Coca Guazzini, Malucha Pinto and Cristián García-Huidobro in the context of the Coronavirus Pandemic by streaming.

== Filmography ==
=== Films ===
Film
Year	Film	Character
1980	Cuestión de ubicación	Cristián
1988	Imagen latente	
2001	Te amo (Made in Chile)	
2003	Cesante	Gallo Claudio (voz)
2004	Tendida, mirando las estrellas	
2006	Pretendiendo	Hermano Juan
2009	Super, todo Chile adentro	Supervisor Vivados
2012	Mi último round	Don Chalo
2013	El árbol magnético	Diego
2013	El derechazo	Talibán Monteira
2015	American Huaso	Tío Ringo
2019	Oblivion Verses	
2021	La mirada incendiada	

=== TV soaps ===
Telenovelas
Year	Title	Role	Channel
1976	Sol tardío	Tomás	TVN
1977	El secreto de Isabel		TVN
1977	La Colorina	Iván	TVN
1981	La Madrastra	Carlos Diez Cabezas	Canal 13
1982	La Señora	Germán	Canal 13
1982	Bienvenido Hermano Andes	Andes Villarroel	Canal 13
1983	Las herederas	Octavio Suárez	Canal 13
1985	El prisionero de la media noche	León	Canal 13
1994	Rojo y miel	Félix Flores	TVN
1996	Marrón Glacé, el regreso	Marcos	Canal 13
1997	Playa salvaje	Juan Carlos Cárcamo	Canal 13
2001	Corazón pirata	Adonis Marambio	Canal 13
2002	Buen partido	Roberto Sánchez	Canal 13
2007	Vivir con 10	Fidelio Mondaca	Chilevisión
2008	Mala Conducta	Padre Plinio Bobadilla	Chilevisión
2010	Mujeres de lujo	Víctor Tapia	Chilevisión
2014	El amor lo manejo yo	Waldo Guerrero	TVN
2015	Matriarcas	Francisco Álvarez	TVN
2017	Un diablo con ángel	Osvaldo Morales	TVN

=== TV series ===
TV shows
Year	Title	Role	Channel
1996	Madre e hijo		TVN
1997	La Buhardilla	Bilhem Van Dessel	TVN
1998–1999	Los Cárcamo	Juan Carlos Cárcamo	Canal 13
2005	Mitú	Bruno Carreño	Mega
2006	Reporteras	Esteban	Chilevisión
2008	Huaiquimán y Tolosa	Darío	Canal 13
2009	Mis años grossos	Sergio Molina	Chilevisión
2011	Vampiras	Conde Bonifacio Piuchén	Chilevisión
2012 y 2014	Los 80	Ricardo Hassad	
2013	Infieles	Don Tito	Chilevisión
2014	Modern Family Chile	Vecino	Mega
2016	Moperna	Osvaldo Morales	TVN
2020	El presidente	Rafael Esquivel	Amazon
