= Ugly Me =

Pretendiendo
- Theatrical release poster
- Directed by: Claudio Dabed
- Written by: Claudio Dabed
- Starring: Bárbara Mori; Marcelo Mazzarello; Amaya Forch; Rodrigo Muñoz; Gonzalo Robles; Felipe Camiroaga; Jaime Azócar
- Distributed by: Paramount Pictures (Latin America)
- Release date: October 2006
- Running time: 118 minutes
- Country: Chile
- Language: Spanish

Ugly Me (Spanish: Pretendiendo, lit. 'Pretending') is a 2006 Chilean romantic comedy film directed and written by Claudio Dabed. The film is about a beautiful but romantically disappointed woman named Amanda. In an attempt to avoid men and getting hurt again, she adopts another persona, that of an "ugly" girl, while at the same time posing as a gorgeous vixen named Helena. When Argentinian co-worker and ladies' man Marcelo enters into her life, Helena/Amanda will have to re-think her life choices as a single woman. The film stars Bárbara Mori as Amanda/Helena.

== Plot ==
Amanda, a young woman who is both beautiful and psychopathic, works as an architect. One day, she catches her boyfriend Pepe in bed with her best friend, which infuriates her. Her boyfriend denies it despite Amanda hearing him have sex with her friend, and catching them together at her friend's apartment. In a fit of rage, she threatens him with a shotgun and then shoots him in the groin, hoping to prevent him from "cheating" again. As part of a court settlement, a psychiatrist is assigned to evaluate her, and he concludes that Amanda feels no remorse for her actions and would do the same thing again if given the opportunity. Amanda is subsequently fired from her job and decides to leave Santiago. She moves to Valparaíso and finds an apartment to rent for six months. Amanda goes to a church in the city and befriends brother Juan. The two share their life experiences with each other and Amanda begins turning to him for assistance.

Realizing that avoiding romance is crucial to maintaining her new life, Amanda resorts to disguising herself as a frumpy, middle-aged woman with children by using a fat suit, unflattering clothes, buck-tooth dentures, makeup, and a wig. She then meets with Max, a local architect, and accepts a lower-paying job at his office. Max introduces her to the rest of the staff, including Guillermo, a married man who is devoted to his family, Karen, a scheming blonde bombshell, and Marcelo, a womanizer. When Amanda meets Marcelo, they both find each other repulsive. Marcelo is disgusted by Amanda's appearance, and Amanda is unsettled by how much he resembles Pepe.

Max selects Amanda to lead an investigation into a maintenance issue at one of their projects, much to Karen's chagrin. During the investigation, Marcelo and Guillermo accompany Amanda, but they mostly engage in conversation about women and sex, leaving Amanda to do most of the work. While checking on a problem, Amanda is forced to remove part of her disguise, which nearly exposes her identity to Marcelo. However, she manages to avoid detection by shining her flashlight into his eyes. After work, Amanda and Marcelo go out for drinks. Amanda lies to Marcelo, claiming that she has two children, and lectures him about the importance of genuine love rather than just pursuing sex. In response, Marcelo tells her that marriage kills love and goes on to describe in detail what kind of woman he desires.

Realizing the potential of this situation, Amanda begins manipulating Marcelo as her true self, using the alias "Helena". She tells brother Juan of her plan but he is confused as to why she is pretending to be different people, and believes it will lead to trouble. As "Helena", she gradually befriends Marcelo, who is puzzled by her disrespectful treatment of him and seeks advice from his co-worker on how to improve their relationship. Karen, envious of their close bond, attempts to embarrass Amanda by asking her to bring her children to the office. Amanda asks brother Juan to let her bring two orphan boys from the church's orphanage to be brought in to her work to act as her sons, and brother Juan agrees to help her. When Amanda brings them in she observes that Marcelo enjoys playing with them. Later, she teaches him how to cook a proper meal for "Helena". While conversing with him, they share a kiss. Marcelo finds himself becoming attracted to the domestic life Amanda pretends to have, he also tells Max that he is very lucky to have a beautiful wife. Max tells him that he has to work for a family, and not to simply chase after attractive women. Max tells Marcelo to clear his mind and think of a woman, when Marcelo becomes serious at the woman he thinks of Max tells him to marry her.

Marcelo invites "Helena" to his apartment and confesses his love for her. Amanda, feeling that Marcelo's affections are based solely on her unattractive disguise, convinces him to dress up as a woman and handcuff himself to the bed. She then pretends to cut his chest with a fake knife before leaving. The police subsequently rescue him, but the media coverage turns Marcelo into a laughingstock. Amanda later talks to Marcelo at work and discovers that his experience with "Helena" has caused him to swear off relationships until he gets married. Marcelo and Karen begin dating and soon become engaged. Amanda is devastated by Marcelo's decision but agrees to be Karen's maid of honor at the wedding. Amanda goes to brother Juan to tell him everything that has happened. Brother Juan realizes she is in love with Marcelo and urges her to tell Marcelo the truth. However, Amanda says that is a terrible idea since she has hurt him so much. On the day of wedding ceremony, Marcelo suddenly falls silent while delivering his vows. Amanda sneezes, and her dentures fall out, revealing her true smile, which is identical to "Helena's." Marcelo realizes that the two women are the same and breaks off his engagement to Karen. The film concludes with Amanda and Marcelo happily married with their dog, three children, and are expecting another baby.

== Cast ==
- Bárbara Mori ... Amanda Miranda / Helena
- Marcelo Mazzarello ... Marcelo Rocco
- Amaya Forch ... Karen
- Gonzalo Robles ... Brother Juan
- Rodrigo Muñoz ... Guillermo
- Jaime Azócar ... Max López
- Alejandro Cohen ... Dr. Perner
- Paz Bascuñán ... Fernanda
- Felipe Camiroaga ... Pepe
- Fernando Kliche ... Pablo
- Fernando Farías ... Priest
- Ignacio Mansilla ... Detective
- Claudia Vergara ... Max's Wife
- Cristian Martínez ... Nightclub Macho Guy
- Claudio Dabed ... Nightclub DJ
