= Vecchiola =

Vecchiola is a surname. It is the 617,057th most common surname in the World (2022). The name is most prevalent in Italy and highest density in Chile. Notable people with the surname include:

- Guido Vecchiola (born 1973), Chilean actor
- Sebastiano Vecchiola (born 1970), Italian footballer
