= Los debutantes =

2003 film by Andrés Waissbluth

- Film poster
- Directed by: Andrés Waissbluth
- Written by: Andrés Waissbluth; Julio Rojas
- Produced by: Sebastián Freund; Andrés Waissbluth
- Starring: Antonella Ríos; Néstor Cantillana; Juan Pablo Miranda; Alejandro Trejo; Eduardo Barril; Roberto Farías; Adriana Vacarezza; Víctor Montero; Anita Alvarado
- Cinematography: Arnaldo Rodríguez
- Edited by: Galut Alarcón
- Music by: Cristián Heyne
- Release date: June 13, 2003 (Chile)
- Running time: 114 minutes
- Country: Chile
- Language: Spanish

Los debutantes (English: The Debutantes) is a 2003 Chilean drama film directed by Andres Waissbluth and starring Antonella Rios and Alejandro Trejo.

== Plot ==
Two brothers, Silvio and Víctor, relocate from their hometown of Temuco to Santiago after the death of their parents. Silvio works to fund Víctor's education and, on Víctor's seventeenth birthday, takes him to nightclubs where he encourages him to lose his virginity to one of the club's stripper/prostitutes. In a poignant moment, Víctor confronts his rising impotence while Silvio impresses the club's owners with his hiring potential.

Silvio lands a job as a bodyguard/henchman for the gang, earning significant money to support Víctor's education. However, Víctor falls for Gracia, one of the dancers from the club, and begins courting her, leaving school and incurring Silvio's ire and disappointment. Unfortunately, Gracia is the lover of the gang's boss, Don Pascual, who is also Silvio's boss. Gracia is the common thread that connects the tale since she is involved with Víctor, Silvio, and Don Pascual, and the consequences of their strange love triangle are deadly. By telling the same story from the viewpoints of Víctor, Silvio, and Gracia, the film exposes the vulnerabilities and flaws of each character, which lead to the sordid climax.

== Production ==
In this film there is a scene in which Anita Alvarado performs a brief unsimulated fellatio on Juan Pablo Miranda.

== Awards ==
The film was the Chilean submission for the 76th Academy Awards in the category Academy Award for Best Foreign Language Film which took place in 2004, but was not one of the five nominated films. It was also nominated for the Goya Awards.

== Release ==
=== Home media ===
The film was released on DVD in the UK in 2005, and received a mildly critical review in Time Out.
