= Joaquín Marcó Figueroa =

Chilean civil engineer, civil servant, writer (1892–1956)

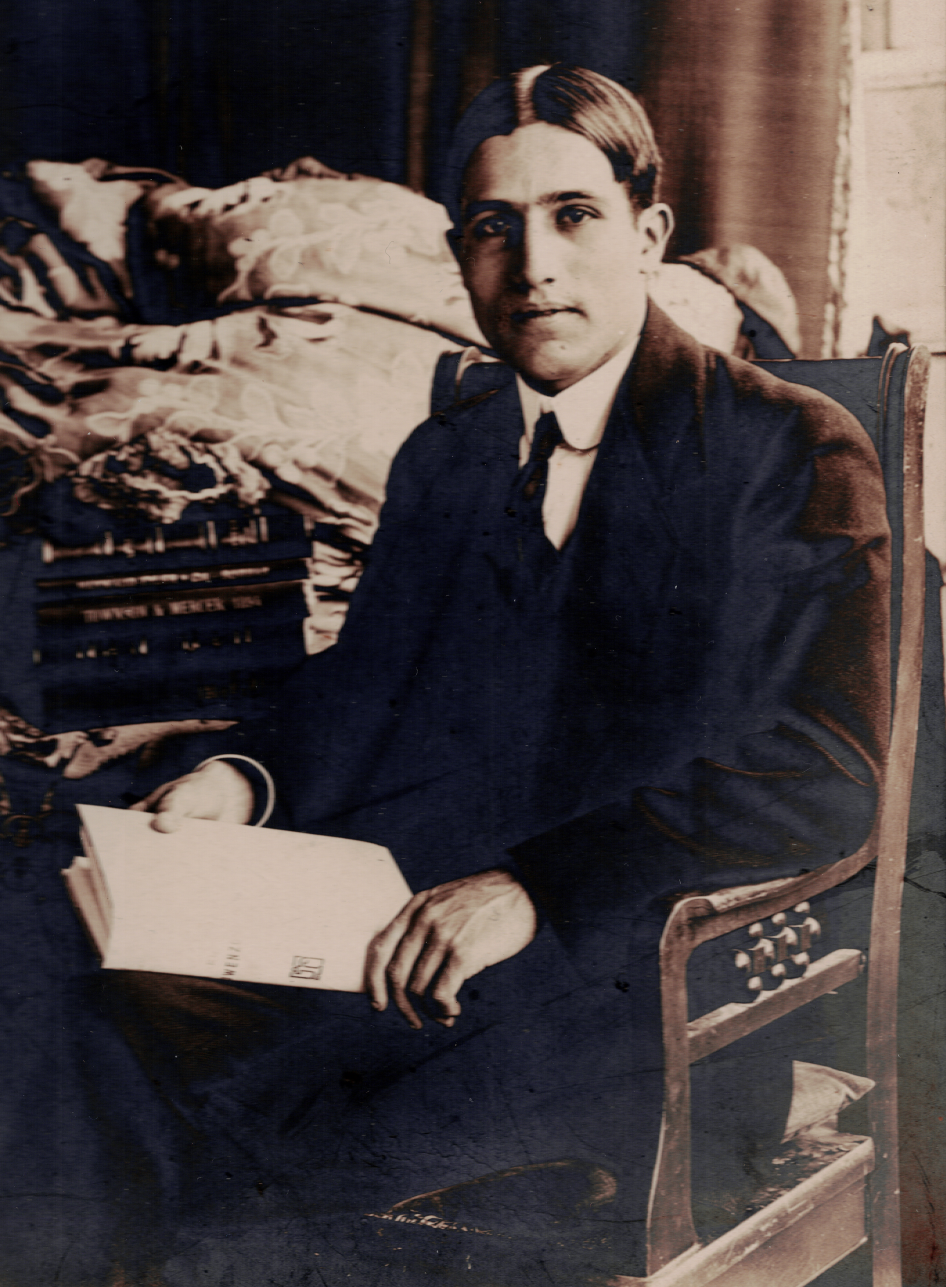
- Figueroa after graduation
- Born: 4 February 1892; Copiapó, Chile
- Died: 18 October 1956 (aged 64); Santiago, Chile
- Resting place: Parque del Recuerdo, Santiago, Chile
- Education: University of Chile
- Occupations: Mining civil engineering, civil servant, writer
- Notable work: Chile Marca un Camino
- Spouse: Nora Haugerud
- Children: Alicia Marcó Haugerud; Halldis Marcó Haugerud
- Parents: Joaquín Marcó Anaut (father); Lorina Elvira Figueroa (mother)

Joaquín Marcó Figueroa (4 February 1892 – 18 October 1956) was a Chilean civil engineer, public servant, and writer.

He was superintendent of the Casa de Moneda de Chile mint from 1930 until his death in 1956. In 1946, he published a book, Chile Marca un Camino, with the intention to highlight the political and social evolution of Chile.

== Biography ==
Joaquín Marcó was born in Copiapó in 1892 to a Spanish father who worked as a merchant, Joaquín Marcó Anaut, and an Argentinian mother, Lorina Elvira Figueroa.

He studied his elementary and high school years in the School of German Fathers and the "José A. Carvajal" public school, both in Copiapó.

For his undergraduate studies, he went to the University of Chile in Santiago, where he graduated as a civil engineer in 1917. The title of his thesis was Irrigación de la Rinconada de Chena. He participated in the execution of the electrification project between Santiago and Valparaíso.

== Casa de Moneda de Chile ==
In 1930, he was appointed superintendent of the Casa de Moneda de Chile, the only person from the Atacama Region to have held that position.

He opposed a proposal to make the one-peso and five-peso coins the same diameter, on the grounds that it would confuse the public. His reasoning was recorded in the 1944 volume produced by the institution itself: "Naturally, if it is desired to avoid the inconveniences that other countries in South America have had with their confusing systems of metallic divisional coins, it would be preferable, in the opinion of the undersigned, to establish (different) weights and diameters."

Also concerned with social welfare, he provided workers with summer cottages on the coast and in the mountains. One of these was the summer cottage in the coastal town of Llolleo, commune of San Antonio, an important seaside resort at the time.

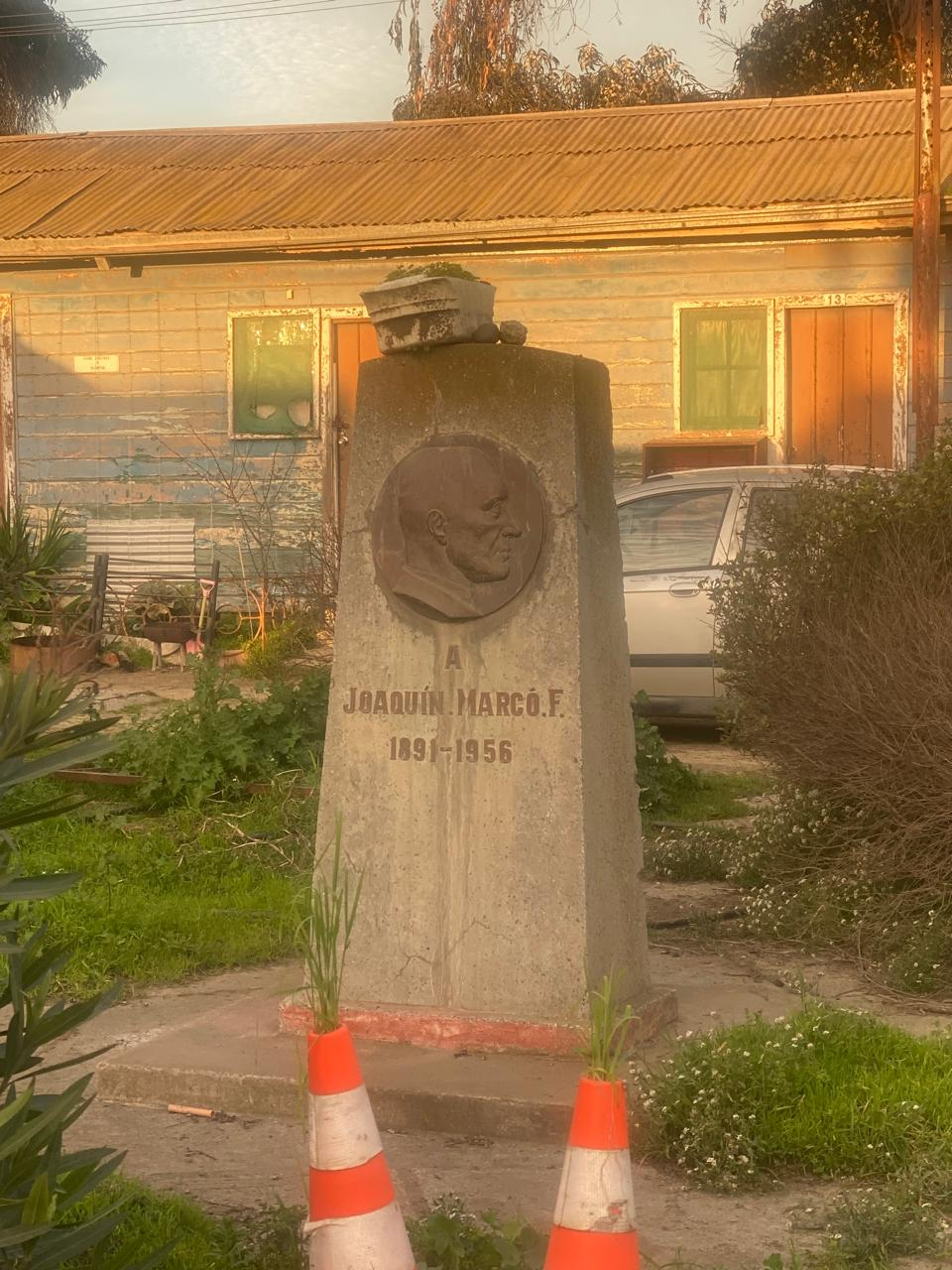
Monument in honor of Joaquín Marcó Figueroa, at the Casa de Moneda summer cottage in Llolleo, commune of San Antonio.

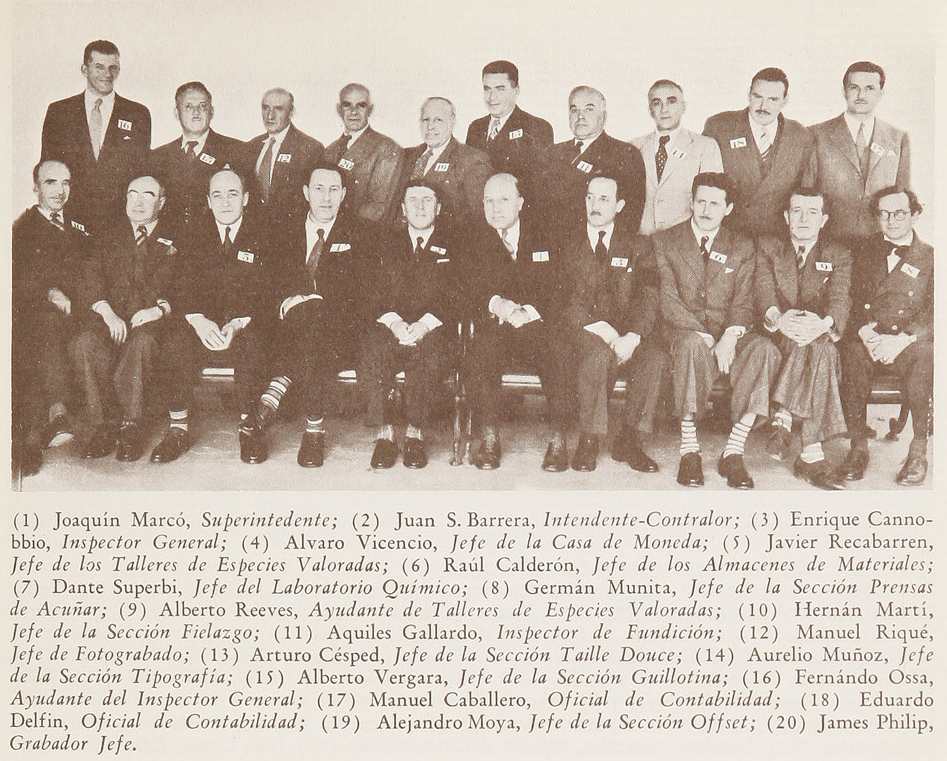
The superintendent (center below) with workers from the Casa de Moneda de Chile

== Chile Marca un Camino ==
Published in 1946 in Buenos Aires, his first and only book was well received and remains held at the National Library of Chile (Sección Chilena, call number 11;(010-45), system record 000269176).

The book's chapters include "Sobre el pasado," "Sobre los descontentos," "La burguesía," "Funcionarios, ingenieros, contadores y maestros," "La moneda," and "El caso Kemmerer" (a reference to Edwin Kemmerer, the American economist who advised on Chile's 1920s monetary reforms), along with chapters on immigration, security, and the future.

The National Library catalog lists his dates as "1892-1946," which conflicts with the 1956 death date used throughout this article and confirmed by the 1966 obituary (explicitly framed as the 10th anniversary of his death). This is most likely the cataloger defaulting to the book's publication year in the absence of a confirmed death date, not a competing fact.

== Death ==
After returning from his studies in Santiago to his native town of Copiapó, he was affected by Staphylococcus aureus. He died in 1956 in his home on Cristóbal Colón avenue, after the bacteria affected the valves in his heart amid a shortage of digitoxin in the country at the time.
