= Guido Vecchiola =

Chilean actor

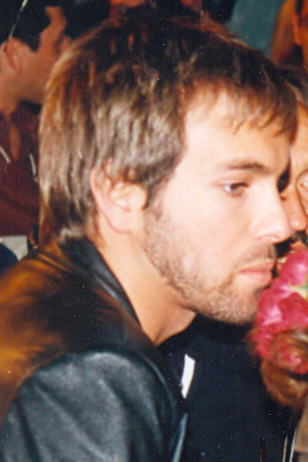
- Guido Vecchiola in 2000
- Born: Guido Vecchiola Arellano; November 16, 1973 (age 52); Chañaral, Chile
- Occupation: Actor

Guido Vecchiola Arellano (born November 16, 1973, in Chañaral), is a Chilean actor in telenovelas, film and stage. He is of Italian and Basque descent.

Vecchiola was born in Chañaral and has two brothers. In 1993, he started working for the Chilean TV channel UCTV. He was best known for his role in the show called Carabineros de Chile (1992). His television debut was in Champaña at 19 years old, and he later worked in El Amor está de Moda, Amor a Domicilio, Adrenalina, Eclipse de Luna, Amándote, Fuera de Control and Sabor a Tí. Later, Vecchiola took a break to live in Europa for three years, returning in 2003 to work in telenovelas like Xfea2, Brujas, Descarado and Lola, and cinema in the film El Huésped directed by Jorge Hidalgo.

In 2007, Vecchiola was a contestant in the TV show Locos por el Baile, taking third place after Fabricio Vasconcelos and Catalina Pulido.

== Telenovelas ==
- 1994 – Champaña (Canal 13) - Greg Brandao
- 1995 – El amor está de moda (Canal 13) - Jorge
- 1995 – Amor a Domicilio (Canal 13) - Matías Undurraga
- 1996 – Adrenalina (Canal 13) - Fabián Undurraga
- 1997 – Eclipse de Luna (Canal 13) - Diego Landa
- 1998 – Amándote (Canal 13) - Nicolás Urrutia
- 1999 – Fuera de Control (Canal 13) - Santiago Goic
- 2000 – Sabor a Tí (Canal 13) - Julián Solano
- 2004 – Xfea2 (MEGA)- Aquiles Carranza
- 2005 – Brujas (Canal 13) - Benjamín Rivas
- 2006 – Descarado (Canal 13) - Daniel Arredondo
- 2007/2008 – Lola (Canal 13) - Gonzalo Castro
- 2010 – Mujeres de Lujo (chilevisión) - Max Larrazabal

== Movies ==
- 2005 – El Huésped - Jean Franco Bruzzone

== Series, miniseries and TV ==
- 1996 – Amor a Domicilio, la comedia (Canal 13)
- 2003 – La Vida es una Lotería (TVN) - Alberto
- 2004/2005/2008/2009 – Teatro en Chilevisión (CHV)
- 2006 – Casado con Hijos (MEGA) - Helmut

== Theatre ==
- 2004 – Se busca impotente para convivir
- 2005/2006 – El cuando quiere, Ellas cuando pueden
- 2007 – El Virus
- 2007 – Costalazo
- 2008/2009 – Tape
- 2009 – Conmigo no cuenten
- 2010 – Toc-Toc
- 2010 - En la cama
- 2012 - Toc-Toc

== Advertisements ==
In the 1990s, Vecchiola appeared in an advertisement campaign about road traffic safety. This was remade by the Comisión Nacional de Seguridad de Tránsito in 2023, with Vecchiola again appearing.
