= De chincol a jote =

- Genre: Comedy; Sketch; Social satire
- Directed by: Cristián Mason
- Starring: Cristián García-Huidobro, Gonzalo Robles, Coca Guazzini, Malucha Pinto, Roberto Poblete, Myriam Palacios, Alex Zisis, César Arredondo, Tatiana Molina
- Country of origin: Chile
- Original language: Spanish
- No. of seasons: 5

Production
- Production locations: Santiago, Chile
- Running time: 30 minutes (with commercials)

Original release
- Network: Canal 13
- Release: 1987 – 1991

De chincol a jote was a Chilean comedy show broadcast on Canal 13 between 1987 and 1991. In 1993, a retelling called El chincol ataca de nuevo was broadcast.

Although they had a large cast, the actors Cristián García-Huidobro, Gonzalo Robles, Coca Guazzini, Malucha Pinto starred in most of the sketches. They were part of all the seasons of the program. In 2019, one of its sections, Hermosilla and Quintanilla, returned as a recounting and interview program.

== Sketches ==
Among the most popular sections of the program were the following sketches:

- Humbertito y Gaspar (Humbertito and Gaspar): The story of two friends, Humberto and Gaspar (Cristián García-Huidobro and Roberto Poblete). Humbertito doesn't understand his friend Gaspar's stories and jokes. For this reason, Gaspar has to explain them to him through drawings and representations. At the end of each explanation, Humbertito understands the stories or jokes in his own way.
- Hermosilla y Quintanilla (Hermosilla and Quintanilla): Hermosilla and Quintanilla (García-Huidobro and Gonzalo Robles) work as office workers, with an aesthetic very similar to that of public administration. They are both pretty mediocre as employees and are just looking to have fun. Also notable are the characters señorita Astrid (Coca Guazzini) and Gatica (Luis Gnecco).
- Los Hueseros (The Hueseros): Lucho (Robles) and his compadre (García-Huidobro) work collecting waste materials, such as bones and bottles. Together with their wives, Tere (Guazzini) and Perla (Malucha Pinto), they live entertaining adventures. Although the characters live in extreme poverty, their concerns, such as love and family, are no different from those of other people.
