= Esperanza Silva =

Chilean actress (born 1960)

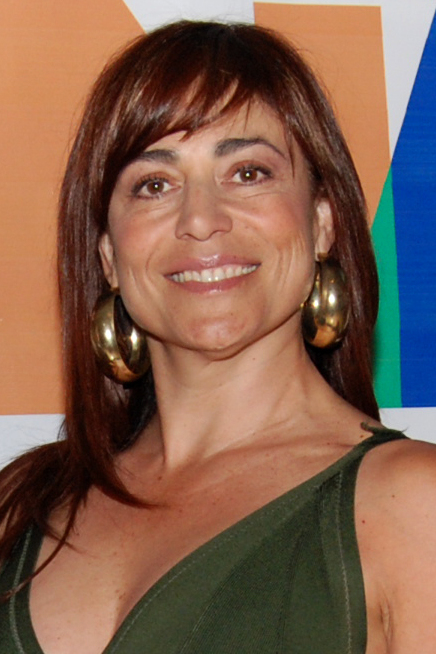
- Silva in 2010
- Born: María Esperanza Silva Soura; July 12, 1960 (age 66); Santiago, Chile
- Occupations: Actress, Union leader
- Years active: 1981–present

María Esperanza Silva Soura (Santiago, July 12, 1960) is a Chilean actress, theater director and union leader, with a career in theater, film and television. She is the daughter of the prominent Chilean announcer and actor Sergio Silva Acuña.

She studied theater at the University of Chile between 1986 and 1991. That same year she completed a postgraduate degree in theater directing from the Pontificia Universidad Católica de Chile.

His career in theater began in the 1980s, in works such as Esperando la carroza, La colombiana, the theatrical version of Pantaleón y las visitadoras, and then in the leading role in Ocúpate de Amelia (1990), by Georges Feydeau, El derrumbe (2002), by Arthur Miller, both directed by Ramón Núñez. In 2005 she acted in Rompiendo Códigos. Fuente Ovejuna by Lope de Vega, directed by Jorge Cano, Colombian director, (1983).

On television she has developed a wide career in humorous spaces and telenovelas such as El milagro de vivir, El palo al gato (1992), Marrón Glacé (1993), Champagne (1994), El amor está de moda (1995), Fuera de control (1999), Tentación (2004), Gatas y tuercas (2005), Viuda Alegre (2008) and Infiltrados (2011). Since the 2000s she has dabbled in series and units such as Tiempo final: en tiempo real (2004–2006), Heredia (2004), Loco por ti (2004), Geografía del deseo (2004), Reporteras (2006), Volver a mí.

She has also participated in the cinema, such as the comedy Mi famosa desconocida (2000), by Edgardo Viereck and the acclaimed Cachimba (2004), by Silvio Caiozzi.

She has developed as a union leader for the actors. She was the founder of the Corporación de Actores de Chile, a body of which she has been its president. She has also served as director of the Corporation of Artists for Rehabilitation and Social Reintegration through Art (COARTRE); she as second vice president of Latin Artist; and as president of the Art Management Foundation.

In 2013 she became a counselor of National Television Council (CNTV).

== Filmography ==
=== Films ===
Films
Year	Film	Role	Director
2000	Mi famosa desconocida	María Pilar	Edgardo Viereck
2004	Cachimba	Baronesa	Silvio Caiozzi
2010	Lucía	Elena	Niles Atallah

=== Telenovelas ===
Telenovelas
Year	Telenovela	Role	Channel
1982	Alguien por quien vivir	María José	C13
1985	Matrimonio de papel	Pamela	C13
1990	El milagro de vivir	Carolina Rodríguez	TVN
1992	El palo al gato	Noelia	C13
1993	Marrón Glacé	Erika	C13
1994	Champaña	Ana Cameratti	C13
1995	El amor está de moda	Susana	C13
1996	Marrón Glacé, el regreso	Erika	C13
1997	Eclipse de luna	Roxana Fernández	C13
1998	Amándote	Isadora Sarmiento	C13
1999	Fuera de control	Divita "Ita" Villalobos	C13
2000	Sabor a ti	Manana Prieto	C13
2004	Tentación	Regina Domínguez	C13
2005	Gatas & tuercas	Brigitte Troncoso	C13
2006	Charly Tango	Milena Vidal	C13
2007	Fortunato	Piera Perez	MGA
2008	Viuda Alegre	Teresita Rodríguez	TVN
2011	Infiltradas	Deborah Gangas	CHV

=== TV Series ===
Serie
Year	Serie	Role	Channel
2001	A la suerte de la olla	Candy Cañete	Canal 13
2004	Geografía del deseo	Ana Solórzano	TVN
2004	JPT: Justicia Para Todos (episodio "Mentiras verdaderas")	Thelma Spencer	TVN
2004	Loco por ti	Pía	TVN
2005	Heredia & asociados	Magdalena	TVN
2004–2006	Tiempo final: en tiempo real (episodio "Los Venenosos") (episodio "Mano a Mano") (episodio "Infieles")	Paula; Violeta; Raquel	TVN
2006	Reporteras Urbanas	Rebeca	Chilevisión
2010	Volver a mí	Eva Beltrán	Canal 13
