= Marcela Vacarezza =

Chilean journalist and model

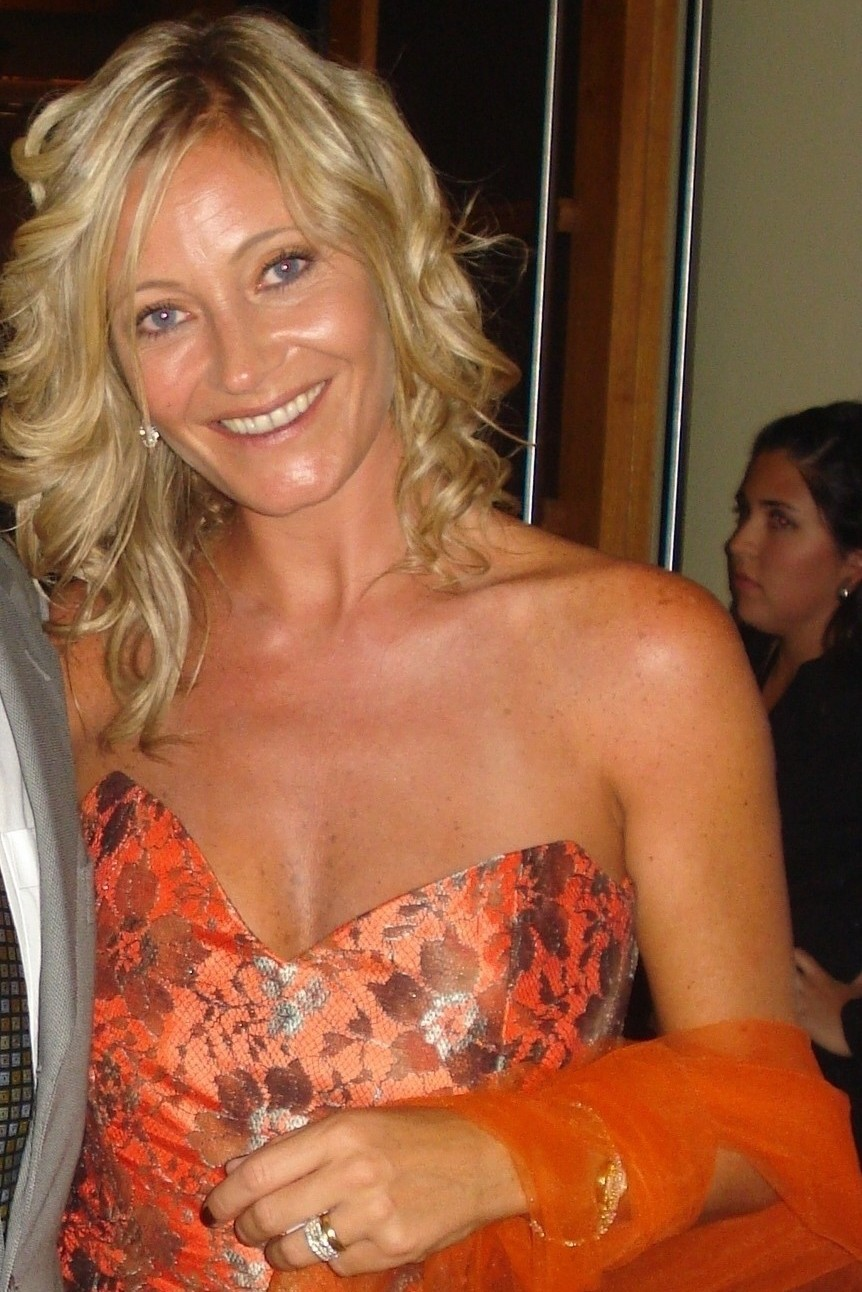
- Born: Marcela Paz Vacarezza Etcheverry; 8 May 1970 (age 56); Antofagasta, Chile
- Education: Pontifical Catholic University of Chile (B.A. in Psychology)
- Occupations: Television presenter, journalist, psychologist
- Title: Miss Chile 1992
- Spouse: Rafael Araneda
- Children: 3
- Relatives: Adriana Vacarezza (sister)

Marcela Paz Vacarezza Etcheverry (born 8 May 1970 in Antofagasta) is a Chilean actress, psychologist and beauty pageant titleholder. She is married to the TV host Rafael Araneda with whom she has three children, Martina, Florencia and Vicente.

Marcela is the daughter of hematologist Ricardo Vacarezza Yávar and the younger sister of actress Adriana Vacarezza. Marcela won Miss Universo Chile 1992 pageant and represented her country at Miss Universe 1992 and in the same year she started her television career. Following a maternity leave, she returned on TV as hostess for En Portada (On Cover) until 2005. Currently, Marcela is part of the television show SQP.

== TV shows ==
- Coctel 1992–1994
- La Ola (La Red) 1994–1998
- Enemigas (CHV) 2000–2003
- En Portada (La Red) 2004–2006
- Gente Como Tú (CHV) 2006–2008
- SQP (CHV) 2009–2011
