= The Magnetic Tree =

- Film poster
- Spanish: El árbol magnético
- Directed by: Isabel de Ayguavives
- Written by: Isabel de Ayguavives
- Produced by: Sergio Gándara, Ignacio Monge, Rafael Álvarez, Leonora Gonzalez
- Starring: Andrés Gertrúdix, Manuela Martelli, Catalina Saavedra, Gonzalo Robles, Juan Pablo Larenas, Edgardo Bruna, Ximena Rivas, Otilio Castro, Blanca Lewin, Daniel Alcaíno, Agustín Silva, Lisette Lastra, Antonia Zilleruelo, Felipe Misa, Dominga Zilleruelo
- Cinematography: Alberto D. Centeno
- Edited by: José Manuel Jiménez
- Music by: Nico Casal
- Production company: Dos Treinta y Cinco P.C. / Parox / Instituto de la Cinematografía y de las Artes Audiovisuales (ICAA)
- Distributed by: Urban Distribution International
- Release dates: September 2013 (San Sebastián); August 7, 2014 (Chile)
- Running time: 85
- Countries: Chile, Spain
- Language: Spanish

The Magnetic Tree (Spanish: El árbol magnético) is a Chilean Spanish co-produced film written and directed by Isabel de Ayguavives and filmed in Chile. The Magnetic Tree is Isabel de Ayguavives' debut feature film.

The film premiered at the 2013 San Sebastián International Film Festival.

== Plot ==
Bruno, a young immigrant, returns to Chile from Germany after a long absence and stays with his cousins in the countryside. The family is gathered to bid farewell to their house, which is about to be sold. During their stay, they visit a local curiosity that Bruno remembers fondly - the "Magnetic Tree". The tree has a mysterious magnetic force so powerful that it can pull cars towards itself.

As the family spends time together, they engage in free and open conversations that reveal the complex emotions that come with familial relationships.

== Cast ==
- Andrés Gertrúdix
- Catalina Saavedra
- Manuela Martelli
- Gonzalo Robles
- Juan Pablo Larenas
- Daniel Alcaíno
- Edgardo Bruna
- Lisette Lastra

== Production ==
- The movie is a Chilean-Spanish production by Dos Treinta y Cinco P.C, Parox, and Instituto de la Cinematografía y de las Artes Audiovisuales .

== Awards ==
- San Sebastian Film Festival Nominated: Kutxa – New Director Award

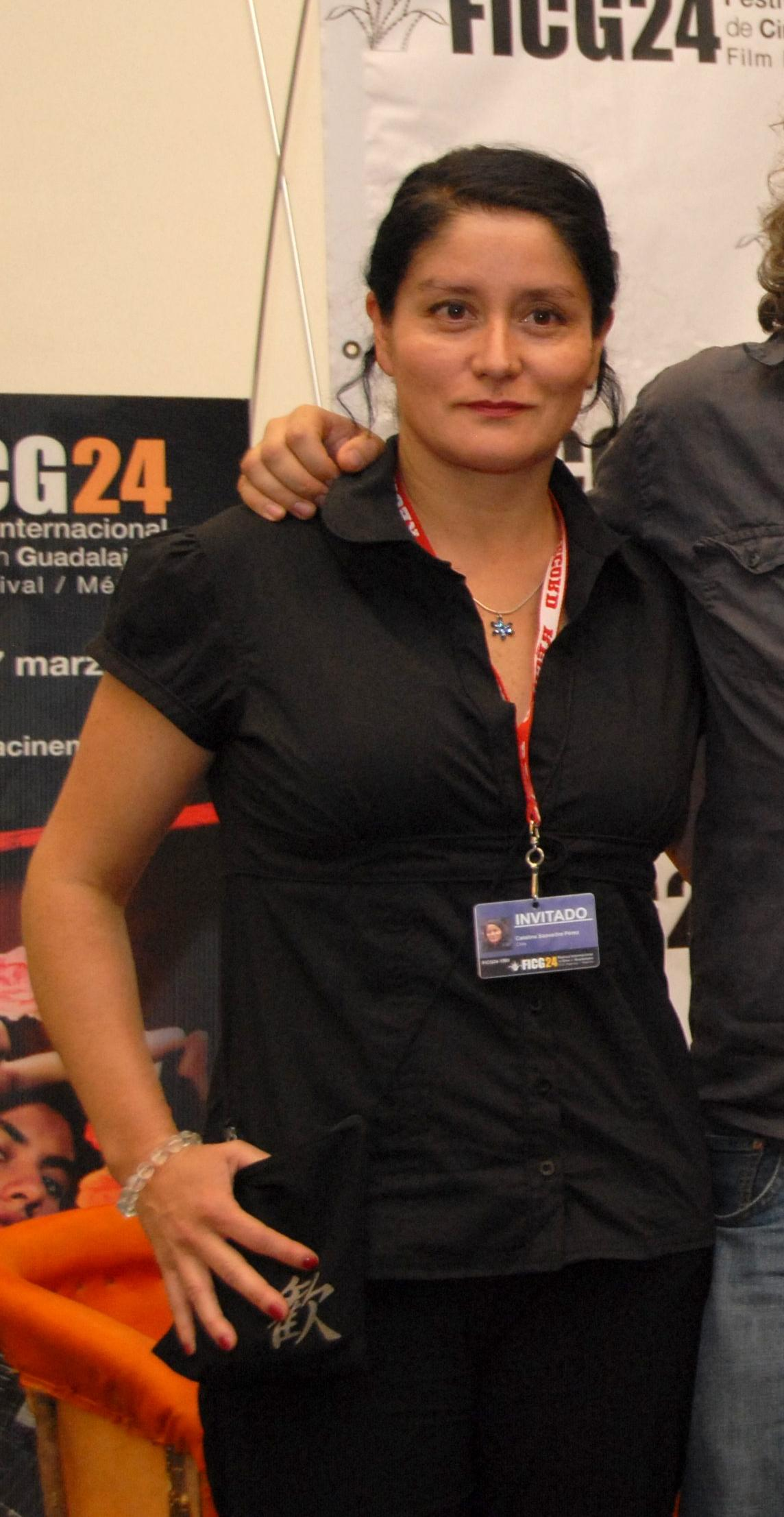
Catalina Saavedra as Carla in The Magnetic Tree

== Reception ==
- The film had generally positive reception.
- Twitchfilm review: "The strongest element of the movie, written and directed by Isabel de Ayguavives, is how it manages to recreate that feeling of a family reunion, specially when it comes to Chile."
- Cineuropa review: "Ayguavives has created a mosaic of different situations that combine to form a subtle reflection on that damned nostalgia that can sometimes end up weighing down too heavily on us."
- The Hollywood Reporter: “Lively and intimate, it's a film made by someone whose interest in and compassion for her people is deep and forgiving.” Jonathan Holland, The Hollywood Reporter.
