= Viuda Alegre =

- Genre: Telenovela
- Directed by: Vicente Sabatini
- Starring: Claudia Di Girólamo; Francisco Reyes; Amparo Noguera
- Opening theme: "Me Enamora" (Juanes)
- Country of origin: Chile
- Original language: Spanish

Production
- Producer: Pablo Ávila

Original release
- Network: TVN

Viuda alegre (English: Happy Widow) is a Chilean telenovela released on March 10 of 2008. It is written by Alejandro Cabrera, Guillermo Valenzuela, Trinidad Jiménez, Valeria Vargas and Nelson Pedreros, and directed by Vicente Sabatini.

Publicity for the series began on January 16 of that year. Two days later, a music video of the show's theme song Me Enamora was released.

== Cast ==
- Claudia Di Girólamo - Beatriz Sarmiento
- Alfredo Castro - José Pablo Zulueta
- Marcelo Alonso - Rodrigo Zulueta
- Amparo Noguera - Kathy Meneses
- Paz Bascuñán - Sofía Valdevenito Sarmiento
- Francisco Reyes - Simón Díaz/Santiago Balmaceda
- Francisca Lewin - Sabina Díaz/Javiera Balmaceda
- Ricardo Fernández - Franco Fonseca Sarmiento
- Alvaro Morales - Yagán Vivanco
- Adela Secall - Paola Zulueta
- Esperanza Silva - Teresita
- Luis Alarcón - Edgardo Mancilla
- Delfina Guzmán - Norita Norambuena
- Rodrigo Pérez - Hermógenes León
- Maria Jose Necochea - Susana Pizarro
- Luis Eduardo Campos - Pedrito Pizarro
- Roxana Campos - Adela Velásquez
- Néstor Cantillana - Andrés Tapìa
- Daniela Lhorente - Milenka Vivanco
- Mauricio Pesutic - Sandro Zapata
- Taira Court - Emilia Recart
- Alvaro Espinoza - Alexis "Chaleco" Opazo
- Begoña Basauri - Carolina Zapata
- Oscar Hernández - Ramiro Opazo
- Santiago Tupper - Marcos Hess
- Verónica Soffia - Lupe Ossandón
- José Sosa - Cóndor Dionisio Vivanco

== Competence ==
- Don Amor - Canal 13
- Mala Conducta - Chilevisión
