= Antonella Ríos =

Chilean actress (born 1974)

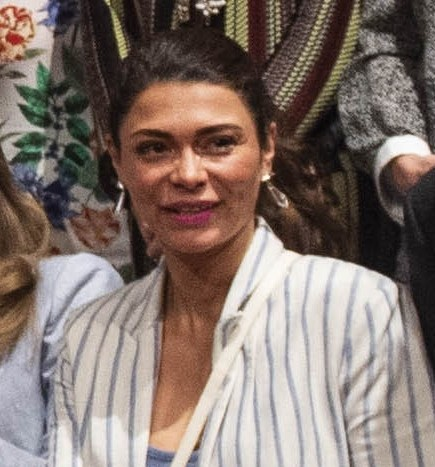
- Antonella Ríos in 2018
- Born: Antonella Ríos Mascetti; July 31, 1974 (age 52); Valdivia
- Occupation: Actress
- Years active: 2003-Present
- Partner: Ítalo Galleani
- Parent: Oscar Ríos Loretta Mascetti

Antonella Ríos Mascetti (born July 31, 1974) is a Chilean television and film actress. Her best-known roles were Mariana in the telenovela Brujas and Gracia in the film Los Debutantes.

== Filmography ==
=== Films ===
Year	Film	Role	Director
2003	Los Debutantes	Gracia	Andrés Waissbluth
2005	Súper, todo Chile adentro	Lorenz	Fernanda Aljaro

=== Telenovelas ===
- Machos (Canal 13, 2003) - Yoly Mondaca
- Hippie (Canal 13, 2004) - Juana Pizarro
- Brujas (Canal 13, 2005) - Mariana Carvajal
- Descarado (Canal 13, 2006) - Catalina Montoya Bernard
- Lola (Canal 13, 2008) - Francisca Monsalve
- Cuenta Conmigo (Canal 13, 2009) - Margarita Jimenez
- Maldita (Mega, 2012) - Claudia Montero
