= Sergio Vodanović =

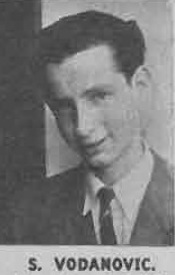
Sergio Vodanović

Sergio Vodanović Pistelli (1926–2001) was a Croatian–Chilean lawyer, journalist, dramatist and television writer. His works were critical of corruption and social structures.

He studied theater at Columbia and Yale Universities. He was professor at the Pontifical Catholic University of Chile and the Universidad de Concepción.

== Career ==
=== As playwright ===
Vodanovic was born in Split, Croatia in 1926. Shortly after, he moved to Chile. His first works were light comedies acted by commercial theater companies. In 1959, Vodanović began to write for the university theaters, leading to a change in style. He adopted a neorealistic style, critically representing diverse aspects of the socio-political reality of his country through drama and comedy. His first such was the social drama Deja que los perros ladren ("Let the dogs bark"), which analyzed from a social and psychological point of view the phenomenon of corruption in the Chilean middle class. Viña, subtitled Tres comedias en traje de baño ("Three comedies in a bathing suit"), satirically portrayed the upper class's relationship with other classes of society.

=== As screenwriter ===
In 1982, he wrote a miniseries for Canal 13 entitled Una familia feliz. It was not until 1984, when his first telenovela Los títeres aired that he became known as a screenwriter. His television series were commercially successful while also intellectual, carefully disguising references to the Chilean socio-political context of the 1980s.

== Plays ==
- El príncipe azul (1948)
- Mi mujer necesita marido (1953)
- La cigueña también espera (1955)
- El delantal blanco (1956)
- Deja que los perros ladren (1959)
- Viña: Tres comedias en traje de baño (1964)
- Los fugitivos (1965)
- Perdón, estamos en guerra (1966).
- Nos tomamos la Universidad (1969)
- Igual que antes (1972)
- Nosotros, los de entonces (1974)
- La gente como nosotros (1977)
- Cuántos años tiene un día (1978)
- La mar estaba serena (1982)
- El gordo y el flaco (1992)
- Girasol (2000)

== Telenovelas ==
- Los títeres (1984)
- Secreto de familia (1986)
- La intrusa (1989)
- Villa Nápoli (1991)
- Doble juego (1993)
