= Cristián García-Huidobro =

Chilean actor and comedian

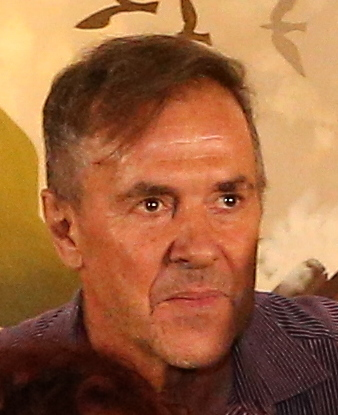
- García-Huidobro in 2020
- Born: Cristian Mario García-Huidobro Lira; 27 May 1952 (age 73); Santiago, Chile
- Occupation(s): comedian, actor
- Years active: 1970–present

Cristián Mario García-Huidobro Lira (born 27 May 1952) is a Chilean actor and comedian.

== Career ==
Known for his appearances on television since the mid-1980s in programs such as Sábados Gigantes where he played Francisco Javier "Pompi" Eguiguren in Los Eguiguren section and Tito García in Departamento de solteros. Later he participated in programs such as De chincol a jote, where he performed the sections such as Humbertito y Gaspar, Hermosilla and Quintanilla, and Los hueseros, among the most remembered.

He also participated in other television comedy shows such as Vamos a ver, El desjueves (remembered by a funny unprepared joke), Na' que ver con Chile, Vamos Chile and Morandé con compañía, among others.

He also has an acting career in theater, and in cinema where he has participated in films such as ¡Viva el boyfriend! (1990), Oveja negra (2001), and Cesante (2003).

He was part of a group of actors-comedians of great success on television in the 1980s and 1990s, together with Gonzalo Robles, Roberto Poblete, Luis Gnecco, Coca Guazzini, and Malucha Pinto, among others.

In 2009 he ran as a senator of the republic in the Chilean parliamentary elections of 2009 for the V Cordillera constituency, for the New Majority for Chile pact of Marco Enríquez-Ominami, without being elected.

Cristián returned to television, through a new program on the REC TV channel of memories called "Hermosilla y Quintanilla: El Antilate", where Cristián and Gonzalo Robles (characterizing their classic characters Hermógenes Hermosilla and Quintanicio Quintanilla) will interview and remember great television moments with various guests.

== Personal life ==
He is the son of José García-Huidobro Correa and María Angélica Lira Lagarrigue. He has separated three times, the first time with Gabriela Rodríguez, with whom he had Natalia García Huidobro Rodríguez (b. 1975). He is the ex-husband of actress Claudia Celedón and father of fellow actress Andrea García-Huidobro.

In 2003, his problems with alcohol and drugs, and the diagnosis of strong anxiety, came to light, which he managed to overcome with psychological treatment.
