= Los títeres =

- Title card
- Genre: Drama
- Created by: Sergio Vodanović
- Directed by: Óscar Rodríguez
- Opening theme: "Los títeres" by Alejandra Álamo
- Country of origin: Chile
- Original language: Spanish
- No. of episodes: 110

Production
- Executive producer: Ricardo Miranda
- Producers: Ricardo Larenas; Verónica Cerutti
- Production locations: Santiago, Chile; Quito, Ecuador
- Camera setup: Multiple camera
- Running time: 50–60 minutes
- Production company: Corporación de Televisión de la Pontificia Universidad Católica de Chile

Original release
- Network: Canal 13
- Release: March 5 – August 3, 1984

Related
- Las herederas; Andrea, justicia de mujer

Los títeres (lit: The Puppets) is a Chilean soap opera, created by Sergio Vodanović, that aired on Canal 13 from March 5 to August 3, 1984, starring Claudia Di Girólamo and Gloria Münchmeyer.

== Plot ==
The title, literally "The Marionettes", is taken from the marionettes that are made with the main characters as models. These are used later by one of Adriana's old friends, a kindergarten teacher, to tell fairy tales to the children she teaches. It is also a metaphor, referring to the way people are obsessed with money and power which move them as strings move puppets.

In the early 1960s, a relatively rich Greek man named Constantino Mykonos (Walter Kliche) and his 17-year-old daughter Artemisa (Claudia Di Girólamo) arrive in Chile. They come to the Godán household, ruled by Elías (Aníbal Reyna), Constantino's cousin and childhood friend. Artemisa is immediately bullied by his cousin, the spoiled Adriana Godán (played by Paulina García as a young girl and Gloria Münchmayer as an adult) and her school friends. Adriana is jealous of Artemisa's beauty and charisma, and is also obsessed that no woman should surpass her, since her father looked down on her for being female. Adriana's best friend Loreto (Soledad Pérez) is also jealous of Artemisa since her boyfriend, the aspiring writer Néstor (Mauricio Pesutic) is starting to harbor romantic interest towards her. Artemisa likes Néstor, but, also has her eyes set on Hugo (Cristián Campos), the handsome and hard-working son of the Godan's housekeeper.

After Adriana stages an incredibly cruel prank that includes photos of a naked Artemisa taken without her knowledge, and Constantino dies in an accident, Artemisa cannot resist any more. Despite the pleas and support of her best friend, Margarita (Ximena Vidal) and her husband, the photographer Klaus Müller (Marcelo González), Artemisa flees to Quito, Ecuador. Twenty years later, she returns as a cold and gorgeous socialite and businesswoman, determined to face her past. She doesn't know that Adriana, unable to let go of her own jealousy, is already planning to steal Artemisa's hard-won fortune and either send her to a North American jail on false charges or lock her up in a mental institution.

== Cultural impact ==
The final episode of Los títeres shows how Adriana, after all her evil plans crumble, goes completely insane and suffers a regression to her childhood, as a little girl who only wished for her father's unconditional love, which was denied her because she was not a boy. At one point, Adriana jumps into a pool and starts playing with a bunch of plastic dolls, while her old and paralyzed father cries; this is the origin of the Chilean slang phrase "peinar la muñeca" ("to comb the doll" in English), which refers to the loss of reason. Adriana Godán is still one of the most popular villains in Chilean telenovelas, as well as one of actress Gloria Münchmayer's most popular roles ever.

== Cast ==
- Claudia Di Girólamo as Artemisa Mikonos
- Walter Kliche as Constantino Mikonos
- Paulina García as Adriana Godán, (young)
- Gloria Münchmeyer as Adriana Godán, (adult)
- Mauricio Pesutic as Néstor
- Soledad Pérez as Loreto
- Ximena Vidal as Margarita
- Marcelo Hernández as Klaus
- Adriana Vacarezza as Márgara
- Silvia Santelices as Eva
- Tennyson Ferrada
- Carolina Arregui as Gloria
