= The Moon in the Mirror =

- Directed by: Silvio Caiozzi
- Written by: José Donoso; Silvio Caiozzi
- Cinematography: Nelson Fuentes
- Release date: 1990
- Country: Chile
- Language: Spanish

The Moon in the Mirror (Spanish: La luna en el espejo) is a 1990 Chilean drama film written and directed by Silvio Caiozzi. It was entered into the main competition at the 47th Venice International Film Festival; for her performance Gloria Münchmeyer won the Volpi Cup for best actress. The film was selected as the Chilean entry for the Best Foreign Language Film at the 63rd Academy Awards, but was not accepted as a nominee.

== Plot ==
In the enchanting port of Valparaíso, an elderly and ailing sailor named Don Arnaldo lives in seclusion with his obedient and submissive son, El Gordo. Don Arnaldo controls all the movements in the house from his bed, using the mirrors hanging on the walls of his bedroom. However, El Gordo longs for freedom, which he finally finds after meeting Lucrecia. But this rebellion angers Don Arnaldo, who will stop at nothing to regain control over his son.

== Cast ==
- Gloria Münchmeyer as Lucrecia
- Rafael Benavente as Don Arnaldo
- Ernesto Beadle as El Gordo

== See also ==
- List of submissions to the 63rd Academy Awards for Best Foreign Language Film
- List of Chilean submissions for the Academy Award for Best Foreign Language Film
