= Javiera Parada =

Chilean politician

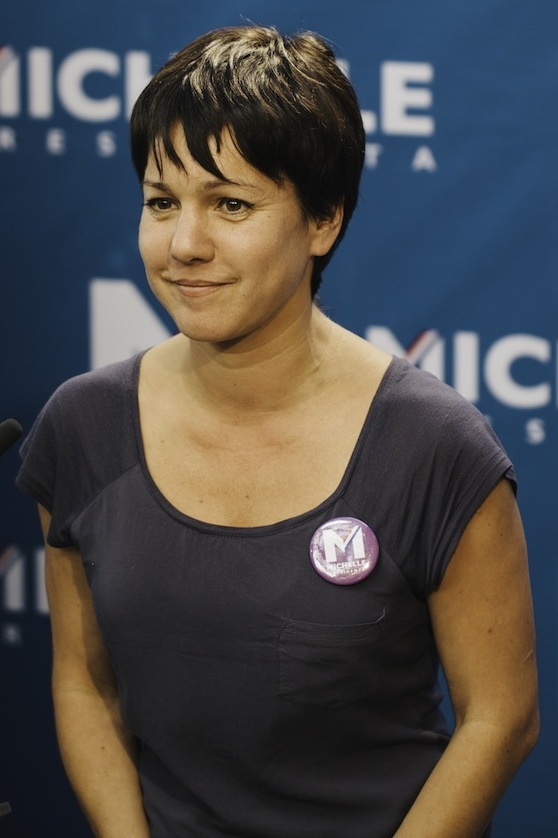
- Parada in 2014

Cultural attaché of Chile in the United States
- In office 2014–2016
- President: Michelle Bachelet
- Succeeded by: Roberto Brodsky

Personal details
- Born: 10 May 1974 (age 52) Santiago, Chile
- Party: Communist Party (1987−1990); Democratic Revolution (2012−2019)
- Other political affiliations: Close to Evópoli (2021)
- Occupation: Politician
- Profession: Actress

Javiera Paz Parada Ortiz (born 10 May 1974) is a Chilean politician and actress.

In 2014, being already a member of Democratic Revolution (RD), Parada was appointed as cultural attaché of Chile in the US by the president Michelle Bachelet, who started her then second government (2014−2018).

== Political career ==
=== Spell in RD and rupture ===
In 2012, she joined RD.

On 28 October 2019, Parada resigned to RD after the party's decision to impeach to the President Sebastián Piñera.

=== Collaboration with Piñera ===
In 2021, her NGO 'Corporación Libertad y Comunicaciones' («Liberty and Communications Corporation») received direct support from Piñera's government to support the goals of the organization towards the then-future Constitutional Convention.
