= Sonia Viveros =

Chilean actress (1949–2003)

Sonia Viveros (2 September 1949 – 22 September 2003) was a Chilean television actress. She was born in Santiago, Chile and died in La Serena. She distinguished herself with roles in the telenovelas La Madrastra, La Torre 10, and Marta a las Ocho.

== Education and career ==
Viveros began working in radio at age 9 and three years later on television. Viveros debuted in soap opera at age 17, becoming the youngest actress of the time.

Although she received no formal dramatic education, she began acting on television. Her first TV series was El Litre 4916 (1967), in which she played the role of Carmencha.

She played a variety of roles in which her beauty, versatility and interpretive strength were her most noted highlights on Chilean screens, becoming well known and loved by the audience. Fame and recognition came in 1981 with the TV series La Madrastra (telenovela, 1981). She also participated in other television series like La represa and the comedy Juani en Sociedad.

Her role as Leonor Encina in the series Martín Rivas with Alejandro Cohen was a notable role. Sonia Viveros, along with this actor, formed a highly ranked television couple.

== Personal life and death ==
Sonia married three times and they were of a short duration. One of her spouses was the producer Óscar Rodríguez. None of her marriages produced children (she was pregnant fourteen times) as she suffered from spontaneous abortion. She decided to adopt two children: Camilo José Tomás and Javiera Esperanza.

Her last marriage was to Professor Leopoldo Segovia, from La Serena whom she met while filming the TV series called Borrón y Cuenta Nueva (Clean Slate) and she settled in La Serena.

In 1985 she was diagnosed with lupus, a degenerative disease of the immune system which in her case seriously affected her cerebral vessels.

== Filmography ==
TV Series
Year	TV Series	Role	Channel
1967	El litre 4916	Carmencha	Canal 13
1967	Juani en sociedad	Juani Möller McKay	Canal 13
1972	O'Higgins	Rosario Puga	Canal 13
1975	J.J. Juez	Javiera	Canal 13
1978	The Voyage of Charles Darwin		BBC
1979	Martín Rivas	Leonor Encina	TVN
1981	La Madrastra	Claudia Molina	Canal 13
1982	La Señora	Nélida	Canal 13
1982	Alguien por quien vivir	Ana Filippi	Canal 13
1983	La noche del cobarde	Sol	Canal 13
1984	La Represa	Silvia Espinoza	TVN
1984	La Torre 10	Thelma Bernard	TVN
1985	Marta a las Ocho	Marta Mendez	TVN
1986	La Villa	Julia Alcantara	TVN
1987	Mi nombre es Lara	Alicia Padilla	TVN
1988	Las dos caras del amor	Paulina	TVN
1988	Bellas y Audaces	Milena Cabral Blanche	TVN
1991	Villa Nápoli	Matilde	Canal 13
1992	Trampas y caretas	Sofía Ortiz	TVN
1993	Ámame	Loreto Castellot	TVN
1994	Top Secret	Olga Mena	Canal 13
1995	El amor está de moda	Ruth	Canal 13
1995	Amor a domicilio	Adriana Acevedo	Canal 13
1996	Loca piel	Trinidad Yávar	TVN
1997	Santiago City	Beatriz Aldana	Mega
1998	Borrón y cuenta nueva	Rosa De Goyeneche	TVN

=== Series ===
- Más que amigos (Canal 13 - 2002) as Gabriela.

=== Television appearances ===
- De Pe a Pa (2003)
- Sonia Viveros with Alejandro Cohen in La Represa (1984).
