= Luz Jiménez (actress) =

Chilean actress, theater director and teacher (born 1934)

- Born: María de la Luz Jiménez Ormeño; 18 December 1934 (age 91); Santiago, Chile
- Education: Catholic University of Chile
- Occupations: Actress, theater director, teacher
- Years active: 1957–present
- Spouse: Alfredo Acuña
- Awards: APES Career Award (2011); La Serena Film Festival Career Award (2015)

Luz Jiménez Ormeño (born 18 December 1934) is a Chilean actress, theater director, and teacher who gained recognition for her performances in the roles of Maruja in the play Tres Marías y una Rosa (1979) and Kiki Blanche in the telenovela Bellas y audaces (1988). She has developed a career spanning 50 years, in which she gained popularity mainly as a theater and television actress.

She began acting theatrically in the 1950s, and during the 1980s became one of the first important figures of the then-emerging telenovela industry at Televisión Nacional de Chile (TVN) centered around Sonia Fuchs. Since then, she has been considered one of the country's most respected figures in the performing arts.

Among her most recognized collaborations are those she formed with director Vicente Sabatini, appearing in important telenovelas such as La torre 10 (1984), Marta a las ocho (1985), Teresa de los Andes (1989), Oro verde (1997), La fiera (1999), Romané (2000), Pampa Ilusión (2001), El circo de las Montini (2002), Corazón de María (2007), Manuel Rodríguez (2010), and La Doña (2011).

In 2015, she was recognized with a career award at the first La Serena Film Festival.

In 2017, she obtained a small role in the Rede Globo series Os Dias Eram Assim.

== Biography ==
=== Beginnings ===
Luz Jiménez's acting studies were conducted in the mid-1960s at the Experimental Theater School of the University of Chile. However she left her studies incomplete. "I left the theater for a love. I got married and then I had my four daughters". Later, she resumed her studies at the Catholic University's School of Communication Arts, graduating in 1979. During the 1970s she worked as a secretary in the vice-rectory of the university after the censorship of university theaters during Augusto Pinochet's military dictatorship.

She began her career between 1955 and 1960, participating in the various university and independent theater companies, acting in works such as El fin de febrero (1958) by Alejandro Sieveking, La princesa Panchita, Ocúpate de Amelia, and ¿Cuantos años tiene un día? by the Ictus Theatre company.

=== 1979–1990 ===
==== Collective theater and world tour ====
In 1979, Jiménez starred with Myriam Palacios, Soledad Alonso, and Loreto Valenzuela in the play Tres Marías y una Rosa by David Benavente, directed by Raúl Osorio. It was created by Benavente and the Theater Research Workshop (TIT) at Santiago's Teatro Ángel. The work constitutes a milestone in the history of Chilean theater during the period of the dictatorship, given that it deals with the theme of unemployment of the time and machismo from the point of view of three women settlers who try to overcome poverty by weaving burlap in a workshop given by the Vicariate of Solidarity. The success of the play led her to make an international tour of America and Europe.

==== Collaboration with Sonia Fuchs ====
After participating in numerous plays, Jiménez debuted on television in 1981 with the first original telenovela on TVN, Villa Los Aromos, directed by Claudio Guzmán and produced by Sonia Fuchs. In the telenovela she shared the stage with Arnaldo Berríos and Mario Montilles. This turned out to be a shaky experience for the established theater actress, but it served as a rapid introduction to television. After this opportunity the actress achieved a great friendship with Fuchs, collaborating on all her productions until 1991. Next she would work with Malú Gatica, Loreto Valenzuela, and Alfredo Castro in La represa (1984), in which she played a peasant woman faithful to her employer played by Gatica. Later she was part of the cast of La torre 10 (1984). She obtained a starring role in Marta a las ocho, along with Sonia Viveros and Lucy Salgado, playing Amneris, a woman characterized by her soft tone of voice, elegance, and taste for opera music. The result was excellent. It not only satisfied the public, but also TVN. In the following years, she acted in the melodramas Morir de amor (1985), La dama del balcón (1986), La villa (1986), and the miniseries La Quintrala. In 1987 she appeared in Mi nombre es Lara, where she played Lucrecia Ferrer, a sober and elegant writer of famous novels who falls in love with an executive played by Eduardo Barril.

After participating in numerous telenovelas, Luz Jiménez had her first big role with a leading character: Kiki Blanche in Bellas y Audaces (1988), directed by Ricardo Vicuña and in which she shared credits with actresses such as Sonia Viveros, Silvia Piñeiro, and debutante Ana María Gazmuri. Director Vicuña declared: "We tried many figures and we bet on her. For her charisma and great sweetness. It was not an easy role and she did it very well". In 1989 she took the part of one of the central characters of the highly successful series Teresa de los Andes, where she played a religious leader of a convent where Sister Teresa was played by Paulina Urrutia. According to the actress herself, this was one of the best characters she has played on television.

=== 1991–1995 ===
==== Training of new actors ====
At the beginning of 1990, she withdrew temporarily from television to teach and train new actors. Between 1991 and 1995 she would join the faculty of The Theater Club of director Fernando González. Among her students were the actors Carolina Fadic, Tamara Acosta, Aline Küppenheim, Álvaro Morales, and Francisca Gavilán. Jiménez clarified, "What I have tried most to convey to you is that acting is a vocation, an inevitable passion that goes beyond the ego and that harbors a true curiosity about life, a desire to tell, a love for the game". According to Tamara Acosta, "She (Luz) was my first acting teacher. She was very important in my training; she had that wonderful thing about the warmth of putting together a team".

=== 1997–2014 ===
==== Collaboration with Sabatini and TVN's golden age ====
After a period without major projects, Jiménez regained public favor in 1997 after participating in Oro Verde, again under the direction of Vicente Sabatini, where she gave life to a gossipy woman in charge of a popular hairdresser's in the fictional town of Los Robles in Caburga. The actress shared scenes with Álvaro Morales, José Soza, and Maricarmen Arrigorriaga. The following year, she obtained a secondary role in Amándote on Canal 13, directed by Ricardo Vicuña.

In 1999, she played Doña Mirta Jaramillo in La Fiera, a woman who believes in the myths and legends of Chiloé. The character had the hope that El Caleuche would return her husband who was missing in the ocean after a shipwreck. The actress managed to give an exceptional interpretation of the character, and was positioned as one of the most charismatic actresses of the year. In 2016, she declared "this character has always been in my heart".

At the beginning of the decade, she moved to Mejillones with the Sabatini team to join the cast of Romané (2000). In the telenovela she played the Roma character Mama Pasca Antich, the respected sister of the king of the ethnic colony, who fights against the pain and abandonment of her only son who went to the capital for an unrequited love. In the melodrama she shared credits with Juan Falcón, Claudia di Girolamo, Héctor Noguera, and Luis Alarcón. Like her previous character, she counts this as one of her best roles in television. In 2001 she participated in Pampa Ilusión, filmed at Humberstone and Santa Laura Saltpeter Works, where she played a southern prostitute named La Poroto, who together with her young colleague arrive at the fictional Pampa Ilusión office, hired to work in a clandestine brothel of a blind man who owns the place's only grocery store. She shared credits with José Soza, Ximena Rivas, Pablo Schwarz, and Roxana Campos. Later came the comedy El circo de las Montini (2002) with Violeta Vidaurre, in which she played a sweet poodle trainer in the circus. In 2005 she starred with María Izquierdo and Ximena Rivas in the play Madre by Rodrigo Pérez.

In 2007, she participated in Corazón de María, where she played a reading and writing teacher for adults who did not have opportunities. The same year, she made an outstanding appearance in the drama Cárcel de mujeres, portraying an elderly inmate and sharing credits with Claudia Di Girolamo and Paulina García. She also participated in the series Héroes, Los 80, and Huaiquimán y Tolosa on Canal 13. In the latter she acted sharing credits with Benjamín Vicuña. She was also acting director at the School of Theater of the University of the Andes, which took first place in the National Festival of University Theater (FESTESA).

In 2010, Jiménez was hired by the Dramatic Area of Chilevisión under the direction of Vicente Sabatini, to play María Loreto Erdoíza y Aguirre in the historical bicentennial production Manuel Rodríguez. In an interview she said, "It is an honor to play this role. Manuel Rodríguez was very brave, very detached, and consistent. Maybe there are new guerrillas out there, I do not know, but it is very nice to listen to Viva Chile in that way; something trembles in here". The following year, she participated in La Doña (2011) as Águeda Flores, maternal grandmother of La Quintrala and one of the most powerful women of Chilean society in the 15th century. In the same year, she participated in Los archivos del cardenal, where she played a country woman looking for her grandson who was arrested and disappeared by the DINA. This role brought her critical applause and recognition on social networks for her moving and respectable performance. According to Daniela Ramírez, "Working with Luz is the most wonderful thing that has ever happened to me", while Pablo Illanes posted on his Twitter account, "Luz Jimenez is an extraordinary actress". She played another moving role in the Matías Bize film The Life of Fish. It went on to win a Goya Award in the category of Best Spanish-Language Foreign Film.

Her next films were the romantic drama Gloria (2013) by Sebastián Lelio, along with Paulina García, and the Chilean-French autobiographical film The Dance of Reality (2014) by Alejandro Jodorowsky.

In 2014, she played a small supporting role in Las 2 Carolinas. At the launch of the telenovela, in Puente Alto, Jiménez was applauded by the public, where she received a deafening ovation. The actress declared, "For me it was a very big impact. I never expected it; it impressed me. I had never experienced something like that, an ovation for me; it fills me with joy, emotion, and gratitude". She next appeared in the series Zamudio (2015), where she met for the first time with the director Juan Ignacio Sabatini. In the psychological drama, which also starred Daniel Muñoz, Francisca Gavilán, and Nicolás Rojas, she played the grandmother of Daniel Zamudio. Around the same time, she starred in the music video "Presentiemiento" by Prehistöricos.

=== 2015–present ===
==== Theater tours and awards ====
In 2015, she was recognized with an award for cinematic, theatrical, and television career at the first La Serena Film Festival. The same year, she joined the company Niño Proletario and performed with José Soza, Paola Lattus, and Ángel Lattus in El otro, directed by Luis Guenel. The play is based on the book El infarto del alma by Diamela Eltit and Paz Errázuriz, about the theme of possible love within a psychiatric hospital. The production was presented in unconventional places in the country and toured Spain, the Netherlands, and Belgium. In 2016, she starred in Fulgor with the same company, based on immigration and labor abuse. After a good reception in Chile, the play was presented to 150,000 spectators at FiraTàrrega in Spain. In the same year, she performed with Tomás Vidiella and Jaime McManus in the film La memoria de mi Padre, directed by Rodrigo Bacigalupe.

After two years she returned to television, participating in Os Dias Eram Assim (2017) on Rede Globo, performing with the Brazilian actor Renato Góes. In 2017, she took on an international tour with El otro, performing with the company Niño Proletario in France, at Jean Vilar Theater, Paul Éluard Theater, La Ferne du Buisson, Théatre de la Ville, and Jean Arpo Theater. The same year, she starred in the teaser Los Carcamales with Sergio Hernández, Julio Jung, and Fernando Alarcón, telling the story of a group of elderly people living in a nursing home facing Alzheimer's and theft of their pensions. The project received the largest grant delivered by the National Television Council of Chile (CNTV) for its production in 2018.

== Filmography ==
=== Film ===
Year	Title	Role	Director
1983	Rogelio Segundo		Ricardo Larraín
1986	Nemesio	Rosa	Cristián Lorca
1988	Der Radfahrer von San Cristóbal	Mujer escalante	Peter Lilienthal
1999	La chica del crillón	Rubilinda	Alberto Daiber
2004	El tesoro de los caracoles	Doña Santos	Cristián Jiménez
2004	Cachimba	Vecina	Silvio Caiozzi
2004	Azul y blanco	La Quintrala	Sebastián Araya
2007	Redención	The Mother	Joaquín Pavez
2008	La ausencia	Narrator	Ricardo Greene
2010	The Life of Fish	Guillermina	Matías Bize
2011	La lección de pintura	Clara	Pablo Perelman
2011	Aquellos tiempos	Soledad	Constanza Torres
2012	No	Kiki Blanche	Pablo Larraín
2013	Gloria	Victoria	Sebastián Lelio
2014	The Dance of Reality	Queen of Cups	Alejandro Jodorowsky
2016	La memoria de mi padre	Julieta	Rodrigo Bacigalupe
2021	My Brothers Dream Awake	Grandma	Claudia Huaiquimilla
2022	Bardo, False Chronicle of a Handful of Truths	Mother	Alejandro González Iñárritu

=== Telenovelas ===
Year	Title	Role	Type	Channel
1981	Villa Los Aromos	Raquel Muñoz	Co-lead	TVN
1982	La gran mentira	Marisa's mother	Cast	TVN
1983	El juego de la vida	Manuela	Cast	TVN
1984	La represa	Mercedes Loyola	Cast	TVN
1984	La torre 10	Raquel Toledo	Cast	TVN
1985	Marta a las ocho	Amneris Soto	Co-lead	TVN
1985	Morir de amor	Edulia de Venegas	Cast	TVN
1986	La dama del balcón	Carmen Dravichi	Cast	TVN
1986	La Villa	Angie Riveros	Cast	TVN
1987	Mi nombre es Lara	Lucrecia Ferrer	Co-lead	TVN
1988	Bellas y audaces	Kiki Blanche	Lead	TVN
1988	Las dos caras del amor	Luchita Valdivieso	Co-lead	TVN
1989	A la sombra del ángel	Tita Ossandón	Cast	TVN
1990	El milagro de vivir	Flora Jiménez	Cast	TVN
1991	Volver a empezar	Leticia Contreras	Cast	TVN
1994	Rojo y miel	Ruth	Special appearance	TVN
1995	Estúpido Cupido	Raquel de Meza	Special appearance	TVN
1996	Sucupira	Magdalena	Special appearance	TVN
1996	Loca piel	Bernarda Rosas	Cast	TVN
1997	Oro verde	Digna Durán	Cast	TVN
1998	Amándote	Juanita Valdivia	Cast	Canal 13
1999	La fiera	Mirta Jaramillo	Cast	TVN
2000	Romané	Mama Pasca Antich	Cast	TVN
2001	Pampa Ilusión	Lourdes Santana "La Poroto"	Cast	TVN
2002	El circo de las Montini	Leonor Galdames	Cast	TVN
2003	Puertas adentro	Bristela Cáceres	Cast	TVN
2004	Los Pincheira	Domitila Cruz	Cast	TVN
2005	Los Capo	Mercedes Rojas	Cast	TVN
2007	Corazón de María	Alicia Garrido	Cast	TVN
2009	Los exitosos Pells	Ester Redolés	Special appearance	TVN
2010	Manuel Rodríguez	María Loreto Erdoíza y Aguirre	Cast	Chilevisión
2011	La Doña	Águeda Flores	Cast	Chilevisión
2014	Las 2 Carolinas	Rosa Bahamondes	Cast	Chilevisión

=== Other TV series ===
Year	Title	Role	Episode(s)	Channel
1987	La Quintrala	Doña Mencia Reyes		TVN
1989	Teresa de los Andes	Madre Angélica Teresa del Santísimo Sacramento		TVN
1990	Crónica de un hombre santo	Doña Clota		Canal 13
2006–2008	Huaiquimán y Tolosa	Elisa "Yaya" Álvarez		Canal 13
2007	Cárcel de mujeres	Bernardita Recabarren		TVN
2007	Héroes	Rosa	"Rodríguez, hijo de la rebeldía"	Canal 13
2008	Los 80	Señora Mena	"Cualquier cosa, menos mentir"	Canal 13
2008	El Día Menos Pensado	Luisa	"El Cambio"	TVN
2011	Cesante	Sara		Chilevisión
2011	Los archivos del cardenal	Doña Ana	"Hallan los cuerpos"	TVN
2015	Zamudio	Elena "Mami" Muñoz		TVN
2017	Os Dias Eram Assim	Luz		Rede Globo

== Theater ==
=== Acting ===
Year(s)	Play	Director	Notes
1958	El fin de febrero		
1970	La princesa Panchita	Enrique Durán	Chilean National Theater
1978	Ocúpate de Amelia		Ictus Theatre
1978	¿Cuantos años tiene un día?		Ictus Theatre
1979	Tres Marías y una Rosa	Raúl Osorio	Sala El Ángel: National tour of Chile; International tour of America and Europe
1984	El pájaro azul		Teatro UC
1985	Doña Ramona	Héctor Noguera	Teatro UC
2001	Three Sisters	Francisco Albornoz	Sala Agustín Siré
2004	Provincia Kapital	Rodrigo Pérez	Centro Cultural Matucana 100
2006	Madre	Rodrigo Pérez	Universidad Mayor Theater
2008	Autorretrato doble		Festival de Dramaturgia Europea Contemporánea
2009	La casa limpia	Claudio Fuentes	North American Contemporary Drama Festival: Teatro Lastarria 90
2009–2010	Las Palomas de Choferillo	Claudio Fuentes	Centro Cultural Matucana 100
2012	La reencarnación de la Chimba	Cristóbal García	Chilean National Theater
2014	La muerte del príncipe	Fernando Ocampo	Centro GAM
2015–2017	El otro	Luis Güenel	Centro Nave: National tour of Chile (2015); International tour of Chile, Spain, Netherlands, and Belgium (2016); International tour of Chile and France (2017)
2016	Fulgor	Luis Güenel	Centro Nave: Estación Mapocho; International tour of Spain (2016)

=== Directing ===
- Mama Rosa, 1998
- Time and the Conways, 2004
- The Shoemaker's Prodigious Wife, 2005
- Beauty and the Beast (ADAE)
- Nuestro pueblo, 2008
- Amor herido
- A Doll's House
- The Bald Soprano, 2014

== Music videos ==
Year	Title	Artist	Director
2014	"Presentimiento"	Prehistöricos	Tomás Samael

== Awards and nominations ==
Year	Award	Category	Result
2011	APES Award	Artistic Career	Winner
2015	La Serena Film Festival	Artistic Career	Winner
2016	Matucana 100 Auditors Awards	Artistic Career	Winner
