= Casa de muñecos =

2018–2019 Chilean telenovela

- Created by: Nona Fernández; Marcelo Leonart
- Written by: Nona Fernández; Marcelo Leonart; Larissa Contreras
- Directed by: Patricio González; Claudio López de Lérida
- Starring: Gabriela Hernández; Héctor Noguera; Sigrid Alegría; Luz Valdivieso; Celine Reymond; Daniela Ramírez
- Opening theme: "I Will Survive" by Gloria Gaynor
- Country of origin: Chile
- Original language: Spanish
- No. of seasons: 1
- No. of episodes: 128

Production
- Executive producer: Daniela Demicheli
- Producer: Claudia Cazanave
- Camera setup: Multi-camera
- Production company: Mega

Original release
- Network: Mega
- Release: August 20, 2018 – March 11, 2019

Casa de muñecos is a Chilean telenovela created by Nona Fernández and Marcelo Leonart, that premiered on Mega on August 20, 2018, and ended on March 11, 2019. It stars Gabriela Hernández, Héctor Noguera, Sigrid Alegría, Luz Valdivieso, Celine Reymond and Daniela Ramírez.

== Premise ==
The telenovela revolves around the Falco sisters, who learn that their mother, Nora, has abandoned their father after more than 50 years of marriage. This event leads them to question the apparent happiness and stability in their own lives and undertake a search for true happiness. What they ignore is that Nora has Alzheimer's disease and her drastic decision is only a desperate attempt to live to the fullest the days of lucidity she has left.

== Cast ==
- Gabriela Hernández as Nora Elizalde
- Héctor Noguera as Sergio Falco
- Sigrid Alegría as Leonor Falco
- Luz Valdivieso as Mónica Falco
- Celine Reymond as Isabella Falco
- Daniela Ramírez as Alejandra Falco
- Alejandro Goic as Federico Andrade
- Álvaro Morales as Jose Luis Hurtado
- Diego Muñoz as Santiago Balladares
- Paulo Brunetti as Octavio Sepúlveda
- Cristián Riquelme as Rodrigo Hormazábal
- Santiago Meneghello as Mauro Torres
- Teresa Münchmeyer as Gracia Galindo
- Amalia Kassai as Almendra Sepúlveda
- Ignacio Massa as Matías Andrade
- Catalina Stuardo as Ágata Balladares
- Clemente Rodríguez as Julián Hurtado
- Antonia Mujica as Constanza Hurtado
- Emilia Echavarría as Fabiola Valdivia
- Sebastián Sarralde as Sebastián Balladares
- Hellen Mrugalski as Natalia Hormazábal
- Jaime Vadell as Rodolfo Marín
- Coca Rudolphy as Pochi Peralta
- Julio Jung Duvauchelle as Patricio Aliaga
- Ingrid Isensee as Susana Estévez
- Muriel Martin as Claudia
- Pelusa Troncoso as Jazmín Quispe
- Camila Leyva as Martita Rojas
- Luz María Yacometti as Lucy Tapia
- Diego Gougain as Polo

== Ratings ==
Season	Episodes	First aired		Last aired		Average
Season	Episodes	Date	Rating	Date	Rating	Average
1	128	August 20, 2018	28.5	March 11, 2019	28.2	20.4
