= 199 Tips to Be Happy =

- Theatrical release poster
- Spanish: 199 recetas para ser feliz
- Directed by: Andrés Waissbluth
- Written by: Andrés Waissbluth; Nona Fernández; Cristián Jiménez; Marcelo Leonart
- Produced by: Bruno Bettati
- Starring: Pablo Macaya; Tamara Garea; Andrea García-Huidobro
- Cinematography: Inti Briones
- Edited by: Marcos Hervera
- Music by: Pebre
- Production companies: 14 Pies; Jirafa films Retaguardia Films; Zoofilmes
- Release dates: 25 September 2008 (Chile); 17 July 2009 (Spain)
- Running time: 95 minutes
- Countries: Chile; Spain
- Language: Spanish
- Budget: $1 million

199 Tips to Be Happy (Spanish: 199 recetas para ser feliz, lit. '199 recipes to be happy') is a 2008 drama film directed by Andrés Waissbluth and written by Waissbluth, Nona Fernández, Cristián Jiménez & Marcelo Leonart. Starring Pablo Macaya, Tamara Garea and Andrea García-Huidobro. It is inspired by the story Noticias de Milo, which is part of the book Mujer desnuda fumando en la ventana by Marcelo Leonart.

== Synopsis ==
A Chilean couple in Barcelona languishes under the influence of a humid and hot summer. While he tries to lead the promotional campaign for a book that promises happiness, she can't get her younger brother recently dead in Chile out of her mind. His days are shaken by the unexpected visit of a disturbing girl.

== Cast ==
The actors participating in this film are:

- Pablo Macaya as Tomás
- Tamara Garea as Helena
- Andrea García-Huidobro as Sandra
- Àlex Brendemühl as Jordi
- Jordi Dauder as Enric
- Felipe Pires as Milo
- Abdelali El Aziz as Moroccan Bar Waiter
- Soledad Gaspar as Moroccan Bar Girl
- Andrés Waissbluth as Man in the train
- Carolina Clemente as Tomás's partner in Editorial 1
- Oscar Pino as Tomás's partner in Editorial 2
- Diego Muñiz as Long Haired Boy
- Pau Herrero as Curly Haired Boy
- Juan Perona as Hotel Receptionist
- Alana Vandeweghe as Redhead Model Academy
- Rossana Barra as Black Model
- Pablo Vázquez as Artist

== Production ==
Principal photography began on 28 July 2006, and ended on September 5 of the same year in Barcelona, Spain.

== Release ==
=== Festival ===
199 Tips to Be Happy was screened at the beginning of October 2008 in the Ventana Section of Chilean Cinema at the 15th Valdivia International Film Festival, in mid-November 2008 at the 20th Viña del Mar International Film Festival as part of the National Fiction Feature Film Competition and on 22 June 2009, at the 9th Festival La Chimenea de Villaverde.

=== Theatrical ===
It was scheduled to be released on 14 August 2008, in Chilean theaters, but it was delayed until September 25 of the same year to later expand to the Spanish market on 17 July 2009.

== Accolades ==
Award / Festival	Category	Recipient	Result	Ref.
Seoul International Film Festival	Best Director	Andrés Waissbluth	Won	
Antofagasta International Film Festival	Audience Award	199 Tips to Be Happy	Won	
Tarapaca Festival	Best Screenplay	Andrés Waissbluth, Nona Fernández, Cristián Jiménez & Marcelo Leonart	Won	
Pedro Sienna Awards	Best Original Music	Pebre	Nominated	
