= Alejandra Fosalba =

Chilean actress

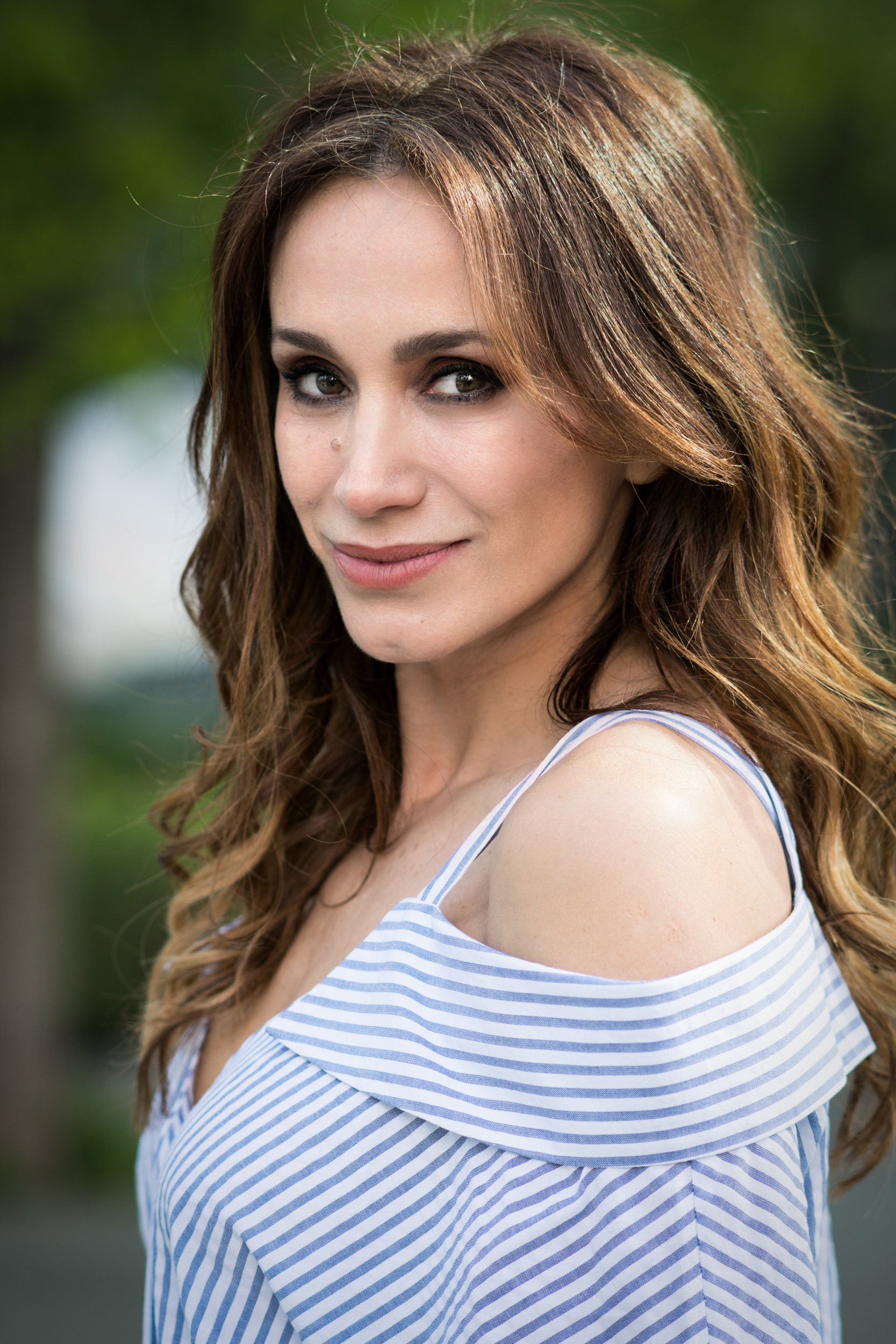
- Fosalba in 2017
- Born: Alejandra Fosalba Henry; 4 July 1969 (age 55); Concepción, Chile
- Occupation(s): Actress, model
- Spouse: Lars Jaederlund
- Children: 2

Alejandra Fosalba Henry (born 4 July 1969) is an actress from Chile.

== Life ==
She was born in Concepción. Right after school, she discovered her calling, theater, and went to Santiago to study.

She has said that her television career was started slowly. Some of her work include Iorana, Loca Piel, and Los Treinta, where she played Diana, wife of the character played by Francisco Melo, who had an improper relationship with one of her friends. In this soap opera she made one of her first adult (naked) scenes.

== Filmography ==
=== Film ===
Year	Title	Role	Notes
1990	El país de Octubre		
1997	Takilleitor		
1998	Gringuito		

=== Television ===
Year	Title	Role	Notes
1990	Te conté	Emilia Larraín	
1991	Villa Napoli	Ismenia Soto	
1992	Fácil de Amar	Lídia Faúndez	
1993	Doble Juego	Susana Pino	
1994	Champaña	María McMillan	
1994	Rojo y Miel	Teresita	
1995	Estúpido Cupido	Gaby Buzeta	
1995	Juegos de Fuego	Camila Casiraghi	
1996	Loca piel	Manuela Phillips	
1997	Tic Tac	Samantha Rouge	
1998	Iorana	Vaitea Ahoa	
1999	Aquelarre	Tina Torres	
2001	Amores de Mercado	Betsabé Galdames	
2003	Pecadores	Filomena	
2003	16	Bárbara Torrent	
2005	Los Treinta	Diana Ramis	
2005 - 2006	Tiempo final: En tiempo real		
2006	Amor en Tiempo Récord	Julieta Neumann	
2006	Disparejas	Marcia Recart	
2007	Alguien te mira	Matilde Larraín	
2007	Herederos		
2008	El señor de La Querencia	Mercedes de los Rios	
2008	Aída		
2009	¿Dónde Está Elisa?	Pamela Portugal	
2009	Conde Vrolok	Beatriz Buzeta	
2010	40 y Tantos	Amanda Ferreti	
2011	Témpano	Susana Norambuena	
2011	Your name is Joaquin	Julia Ossa	
2012	Separados	Macarena Damilano	
2013	The return	Fátima Massar	Protagonist
2014	No open the door	Carla Marambio	(LGBT) group part

== Other parts ==
- Video Musical - "Caliente" - Los pericos - (1996)
