= Hasta encontrarte =

- Genre: Telenovela
- Created by: Ximena Carrera
- Written by: Ximena Carrera; María José Galleguillos; Hugo Morales; Luis Emilio Guzmán
- Directed by: Víctor Huerta; Claudio López de Lérida
- Starring: Luz Valdivieso; Daniel Alcaíno; Sigrid Alegría; Álvaro Morales; César Sepúlveda
- Country of origin: Chile
- Original language: Spanish
- No. of seasons: 1
- No. of episodes: 98

Production
- Executive producers: María Eugenia Rencoret; Daniela Demicheli; Juan Carlos Arriagada; Vania Portilla
- Producer: Claudia Cazanave
- Editor: Nelson Valdés
- Camera setup: Multi-camera
- Production companies: Mega; Chilefilms

Original release
- Network: Mega
- Release: June 22 – December 12, 2022

Hasta encontrarte is a Chilean telenovela created by Ximena Carrera for Mega. It aired from June 22, 2022 to December 12, 2022. It stars Luz Valdivieso, Daniel Alcaíno, Sigrid Alegría, Álvaro Morales and César Sepúlveda.

== Plot ==
Catalina Cienfuegos (Luz Valdivieso), at the age of 18, gives birth to a baby girl named Emilia, who dies of natural causes a few hours after birth. This causes her to break up with her boyfriend and father of the baby, Lautaro Cáceres (Daniel Alcaíno). Twenty-one years later, the couple is reunited after suspecting that their daughter might still be alive, so they team up to try to find her. The suspicions point to Catalina's own family, who intervened, with the help of the well-known priest Francisco Echeñique (Alejandro Trejo), so that the baby girl was placed for adoption.

== Cast ==
- Luz Valdivieso as Catalina Cienfuegos
  - Octavia Bernasconi as Young Catalina
- Daniel Alcaíno as Lautaro Cáceres
  - Max Salgado as Young Lautaro
- Sigrid Alegría as Asunción Echeñique
- Álvaro Morales as Esteban Ugalde
- César Sepúlveda as Cristóbal Gaete
- Coca Guazzini as Piedad Azócar
- Alejandro Trejo as Francisco Echeñique
- Lorena Capetillo as Pamela Castaño
- Francisco Ossa as Jaime Benavente
- Gabriel Prieto as Anselmo Cáceres
- Valentina Acuña as Muriel Benavente
- Andrew Bargsted as Iván Huaiquipán
- Juan Carlos Maldonado as Gabriel Ugalde
- Catalina Benítez as Montserrat Gaete
- Matías Alarcón
- Helen Mrugalski as Blanca Gaete
- Osvaldo Silva as Gonzalo Cienfuegos
- María José Prieto as Vanessa
- María Elena Duvauchelle
- Patricio Achurra

== Ratings ==
Season	Episodes	First aired		Last aired	
Season	Episodes	Date	Rating (in points)	Date	Rating (in points)
1	98	June 22, 2022	18.8	December 12, 2022	16.2
