= Juan José Gurruchaga =

Chilean television actor

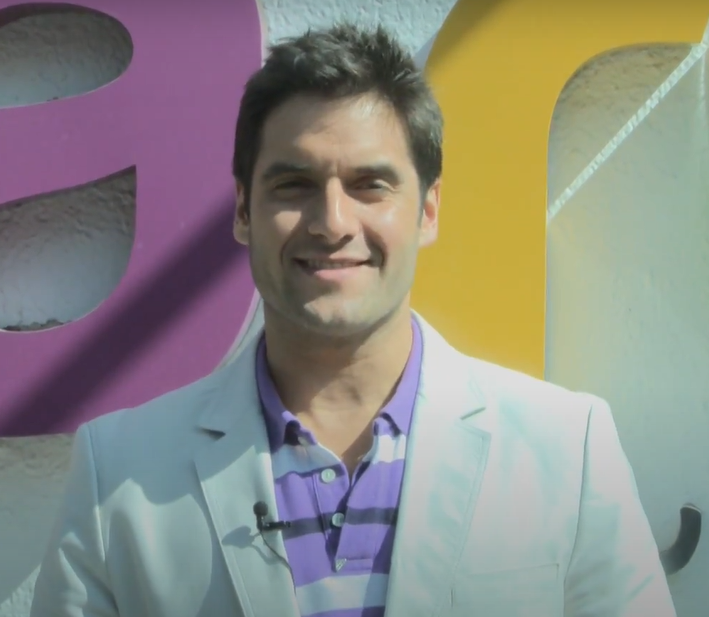
- Juan José Gurruchaga
- Born: Juan José Gurruchaga Vergara; November 29, 1977 (age 48); Santiago de Chile, Chile
- Occupation: Actor

Juan José Gurruchaga Vergara (born November 29, 1977, in Santiago) is a Chilean television actor.

== Filmography ==
=== Telenovelas ===
- 16 (2003, TVN) - Darío Carmona
- Bienvenida Realidad (2004) - Rodrigo
- Versus (2005, TVN) - Álvaro Cox
- 17 (2005, TVN) - Darío Carmona
- Los treinta (2005) - Benito Lorca
- Floribella (2006, TVN) - Gaspar Balmaceda
- Alguien te mira (2007, TVN) - Ángel Montalva
- Amor por accidente (2007, TVN) - Polo Rivera
- Aída (2008), TVN) - Aida's Teacher
- ¿Dónde está Elisa? (2009, TVN) - Detective Esteban Briceño
- Vuelve temprano (2014, TVN)

=== TV shows ===
- Corre Video (2006), TVN - Host
- Los Improvisadores (2010–2011), Vía X - Host, actor
- Radar TV (2011), Vía X - Host
- Quiero Mi Fiesta (2011), Canal 13 - Host
- Mañaneros (2011-), La Red - Host
- Así Somos (2011-), La Red - Host
