= Conde Vrolok =

Chilean telenovela

- Genre: Telenovela
- Created by: Rodrigo Ossandón; Felipe Ossandón; Jorge Ayala
- Written by: Pablo Illanes; Nona Fernández; Francisca Bernardi; Juan Pablo Olave
- Directed by: Víctor Huerta
- Creative director: María Eugenia Rencoret
- Starring: Álvaro Rudolphy; Francisca Lewin; Luz Valdivieso; Matías Oviedo; Claudia di Girolamo; Marcelo Alonso; Francisco Reyes; Alejandra Fosalba; Bastián Bodenhöfer
- Country of origin: Chile
- Original language: Spanish
- No. of seasons: 1
- No. of episodes: 104

Production
- Executive producer: Daniela Demicheli
- Producer: Cecilia Aguirre
- Running time: 40 minutes

Original release
- Network: TVN
- Release: 3 November 2009 – 2 June 2010

Related
- ¿Dónde está Elisa?; 40 y Tantos

Conde Vrolok (Count Vrolok; "vampire" in Slovak) is a telenovela produced and broadcast by Televisión Nacional de Chile (TVN) in 2009, succeeding ¿Dónde está Elisa? Recording began on 11 August and the first episode aired on 3 November of that year. With an average rating of 44.2 points, between 10:38 and 11:16, and a peak of 54, it became the most successful debut of a TV series in the TVN night slot, which can be largely attributed to the popularity of the aforementioned telenovela which it replaced.

The production – created by Rodrigo and Felipe Ossandón, with Jorge Ayala – is the first vampire telenovela made in Chile, and began shooting at Las Majadas Palace in Pirque. The scripts were written by Pablo Illanes, Nona Fernández, Francisca Bernardi, and Juan Pablo Olave, and its first promotional spot was aired on 6 October 2009 during the nightly series ¿Dónde está Elisa?

It stars Álvaro Rudolphy and Francisca Lewin, with supporting performances by Claudia Di Girólamo, Francisco Reyes, Marcelo Alonso, Luz Valdivieso, and Matías Oviedo, and with a special appearance by Bastián Bodenhöfer.

Towards the end of its run its ratings had dropped significantly; its average (at the end of May 2010, counting from its debut) had been 20.3 points, but in the last two weeks of that month it dipped to 18 points, "a situation very different from what happened with its predecessor, that in its final stage averaged 40 rating points."

== Plot ==
In 1880, during a time of war, a mysterious stranger and his companions arrive at a small town, Santa Bárbara.

The people react with distrust to the visit of this mysterious character; the arrival of this attractive, seductive, and elegant man completely changes the destiny of this town. Back in Santa Bárbara, Count Domingo Vrolok unleashes the passions of women and the envy of men, while suspicions about the foreigner's past increase. Soon, the count will have to face his condition after falling in love with the wrong woman, Emilia Verdugo. However, the legendary curse that afflicts those of his race will be more powerful than love.

Vrolok, being a vampire, can not understand human feelings clearly. In addition, a love from the past returns to confuse things further; the spirit of Teresa Salvatierra has returned to recover her lost love, Vrolok. Domingo is at a crossroads between two loves, Emilia and Teresa.

To everyone's surprise, Emilia is expecting a daughter of Domingo. However, the child is devouring her mother inside. Once the daughter is born, Domingo and the others discover, in spite of themselves, that the girl is an ancient vampire; that is, she is weak in the light, garlic, roses, has no reflection, and is half human. Furthermore, Lucio Martino, Vrolok's old and powerful enemy, has arrived in Santa Bárbara to take Montserrat with him and kill anyone who gets in his way.

== Cast ==
- Álvaro Rudolphy as Conde Domingo Vrolok
- Francisca Lewin as Emilia Verdugo
- Claudia Di Girolamo as Doña Elena Medrano / Teresa Salvatierra
- Francisco Reyes as Froilán Donoso
- Luz Valdivieso as Montserrat Vrolok
- Marcelo Alonso as General Juan de Dios Verdugo
- Alejandra Fosalba as Beatriz Buzeta
- Francisca Imboden as Hermana Victoria Buzeta
- Julio Milostich as Padre Faustino Rengifo
- Matías Oviedo as Gabriel Donoso
- Antonia Santa María as Úrsula Donoso
- Pablo Díaz as Santiago Verdugo
- Remigio Remedy as Dario Gutiérrez
- Sebastián Layseca as Tadeo
- Paulette Sève as Luisa Verdugo
- Nicolás Pérez as Fernando Gutiérrez
- Violeta Vidaurre as Ercilia Núñez
- Gabriela Medina as Modesta Pérez
- Bastián Bodenhöfer as Barón Lucio Martino
- Héctor Morales as Capitán Maximiliano Ariztia
- Jenny Cavallo as Teresa Salvatierra
- María José León as Agustina Ariztia
- Otilio Castro as Pancracio Tancredo
- Nicolás Brown as Soldado González
- Felipe Contreras as Soldado Vampiro
- Teresa Hales as Prostitute
- Ángela Vallejos as María
- Paulina Eguiluz as Lucía Cienfuegos de Vrolok
- María de los Ángeles Calvo as Ana Mardones
