= Alguien te mira =

Alguien te mira may refer to:

- Alguien te mira (Chilean TV series)
- Alguien te mira (American TV series)
