= Sigrid Alegría =

Chilean actress

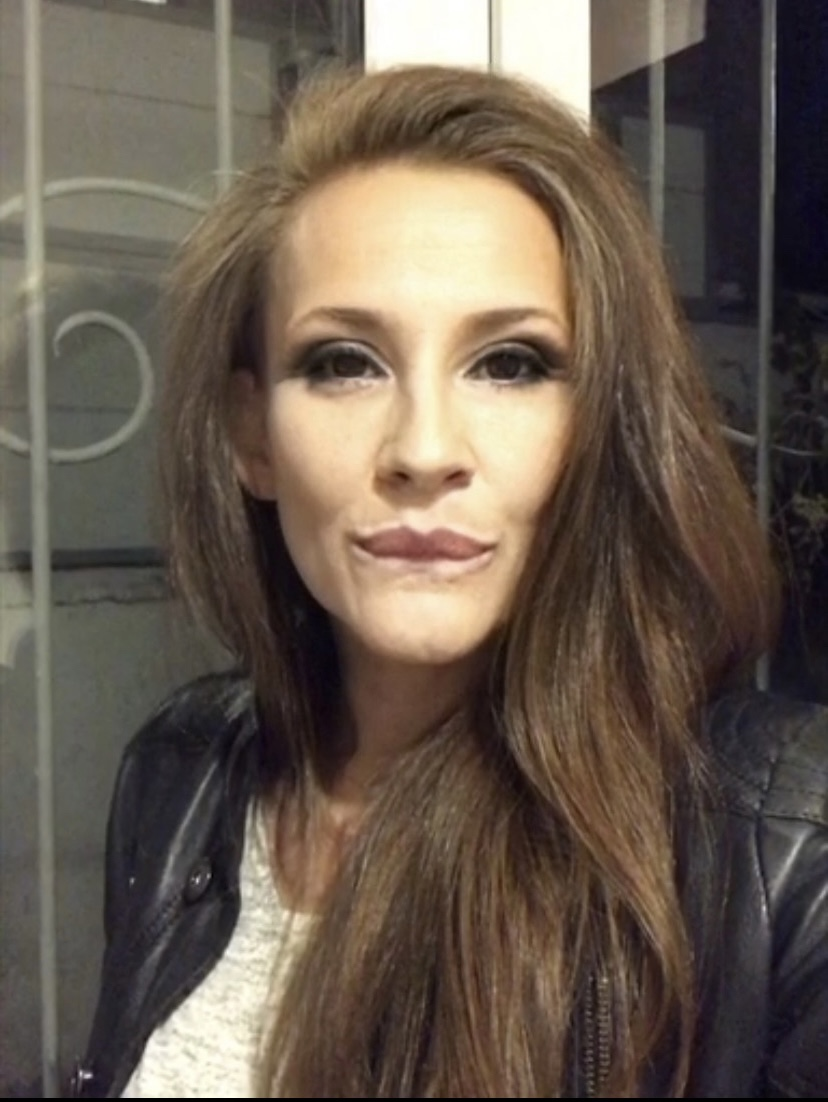
- Born: Sigrid Alegría Conrads; 18 June 1974 (age 52); Rostock, East Germany
- Occupations: Actress, TV presenter, Radio host, Theatre director
- Spouse: Juan Andrés Ossandón
- Children: 3

Sigrid Alegría Conrads (born 18 June 1974) is a Chilean film and television actress.

Alegría began her acting debut in the TVN soap opera Borrón y cuenta nueva in 1998, playing the role of "Doris Morán", a religious nun who was rethinking her life after she found a new lover.

In 2004, she left for Canal 13 to participate in the soap opera Hippie and also Tentación. Not happy with her contract to Canal 13, she decided to return to TVN.

Since 2007, she has been working on night time soap operas such as Alguien Te Mira, El señor de La Querencia, and ¿Dónde está Elisa?.

== Filmography ==
Film Roles
Year	Title	Role	Other notes
2003	Sex with Love	Luisa	
2004	Mujeres Infieles	Cristina Mujica	
2005	Paréntesis	Pola	
2008	Mansacue	House Buyer 2	
2016	Rara	Nicole	

Television Series Roles
Year	Title	Role	Other notes
1997	Historias de Sussy	Berta	
1998	Borrón y Cuenta Nueva	Doris Morán	
1999	Aquelarre	Emilia Patiño	
2000	Santoladrón	Macarena Algarañaz	
2001	Amores de Mercado	Shakira	
2002	Purasangre	Brenda Valenzuela	
2003	Pecadores	Rebeca Flores	
2003	Cuentos de Mujeres	Baby	1 episode
2004	Hippie	Ximena Salinas	
2004	Tentación	Bárbara Urrutia	
2004	Bienvenida realidad	Carla	
2005	Los Treinta	Leticia Lira	
2005	Versus	Cindy López	
2005-06	Tiempo final: En tiempo real	Daniela / Gabriela	2 episodes
2007	Alguien Te Mira	Piedad Estévez	
2008	El señor de La Querencia	Leonor Amenábar	
2008	Cárcel de Mujeres 2	Usnavy	
2009	¿Dónde está Elisa?	Francisca Correa	
2011	El Laberinto de Alicia	Alicia Molinari	
2012-13	Separados	Verónica Infante	
2014	Mamá Mechona	Macarena Muñoz	
2016	Veinteañero a los 40	Fátima Bustamante	
2016-17	Ámbar	Matilde Errázuriz	
2018-19	Casa de muñecos	Leonor Falco	
2019	Yo soy Lorenzo	Jacinta Jofré	
2021	Pobre novio	Betty Cruz	
2022	Hasta encontrarte	Asunción Echeñique	
2024	Los Casablanca	Miranda Infante	
