= Space Invaders (book) =

Book by Nona Fernández

- First edition
- Author: Nona Fernández
- Translator: Natasha Wimmer
- Language: Spanish
- Genre: Fiction
- Publisher: Alquimia Ediciones
- Publication date: 2013 (in Spanish)
- Publication place: Chile
- English publication date: 2019
- Media type: Print
- Pages: 70
- ISBN: 978-1-64445-007-9 (English Greywolf Press Paperback)

Space Invaders by Nona Fernández was originally published in Spanish in 2013, and translated into English in 2019 by Natasha Wimmer. This story follows the jumbled memories, letters, and dreams of some of the classmates of Estrella González, a young woman who mysteriously disappeared under the Pinochet military regime in Chile. The story is structured around and includes many aspects of its namesake - the 1978 video game Space Invaders.

== Summary ==
The novel opens with a memory from Santiago, Chile in 1980. Ten-year-old Estrella González is dropped off by her father at Avenida Matta school where neatly-clothed children sing the Chilean national anthem, pray to the Virgin del Carmen, and annually reenact scenes from the War of the Pacific. As Estrella's classmates age, she only survives through their memories and dreams. They remember her by her braids, her voice, her hand-written letters, her father's prosthetic hands, and the times they played Space Invaders.

The novel continues with another memory from 1982. Estrella hides her red painted nails in her smock as she and her classmates reenter class after lunch. Opposition to the Pinochet Regime is discouraged through death and torture, and the influence of politics begins to establish divisions among the curious, aging students of Avenida Matta school. Some students attempt to spread flyers of a march against Pinochet, for which they are punished. Politics are not the only new source of fascination for the children as they are enamored by new physical attractions and the bright red Chevy Chevette that González's Uncle Claudio drives. However, Uncle Claudio is not truly who he appears to be as evidenced by one of Estrella's letters to a classmate.

In March 1985, opposition members are killed by the Chilean government. Estrella, Uncle Claudio, and the rest of her family are never seen again by any of the students. Opposition members are beaten, tortured, and killed in events like Caso Degollados where opposition members' throats were slit using a corvo. As her classmates continue to dream about her, Estrella writes that she is attending a German school and that contact will be infrequent.

Nine years later, in 1994, the children are now young adults and trials against government officials begin. The children recognize the criminal's faces on the news to be Uncle Claudio and Estrella's father, their suspicions confirmed by the sight of his gloved prosthetic hand.

The novel returns to 1991 and a grown Estrella now has a son and works for a rental car company. After separating from her child's father, she endures relentless harassment from him before he shoots her seven times, killing her. Her classmates continue to dream of the school and the classmate they never saw again.

== Characters ==
=== Primary Characters ===
- Estrella González - The ten-year-old girl whose sudden disappearance provides the framework of the novel. She is the daughter of Don González, a national police officer. Appropriate to meaning of her name, star, she signs her letters with a small, hand-drawn star.
- Zúñiga - Estrella's friend. The others catch him staring at Estrella, but she never seems to notice. He is suspended for spreading flyers which promote a march against Pinochet.
- Maldonado - She dreams about the letters that she and Estrella used to send to each other, which are included in the text.
- Riquelme - The only friend to ever enter Estrella's house. He remembers playing Space Invaders with Estrella for hours, and, most of all, he remembers Don Gonzáles's prosthetic hand.
- Fuenzalida - She identifies Estrella in her dreams by her voice.
- Uncle Claudio - The body guard of Estrella who drives a Red Chevy Chevette.

=== Secondary Characters ===
- Donoso - Part of the friend group that remembers Estrella.
- Acosta - Part of the friend group that remembers Estrella.
- Bustamante - Part of the friend group that remembers Estrella.

== Structure ==
The 70 page novel is separated into four sections titled “First Life,” “Second Life,” “Third Life,” and “Game Over.” These titles refer to the number of lives given to a Space Invaders player before the game ends. Within each of these sections, there is a range of anywhere from three to eight chapters. The length of the chapters ranges from one to three pages long.

The novel contains chapters that are written in first, second, and/or third person, and there is not a single narrator. The first person chapters are presented in the form of letters from Estella to a classmate. The second and third person chapters are narrated by an unknown narrator, assumed to be the author Fernandez or Estrella's classmates. Some chapters do contain a mix of second and third person perspectives. The arrangement of chapters presents many switches between point of view and chronological times.

== Background ==
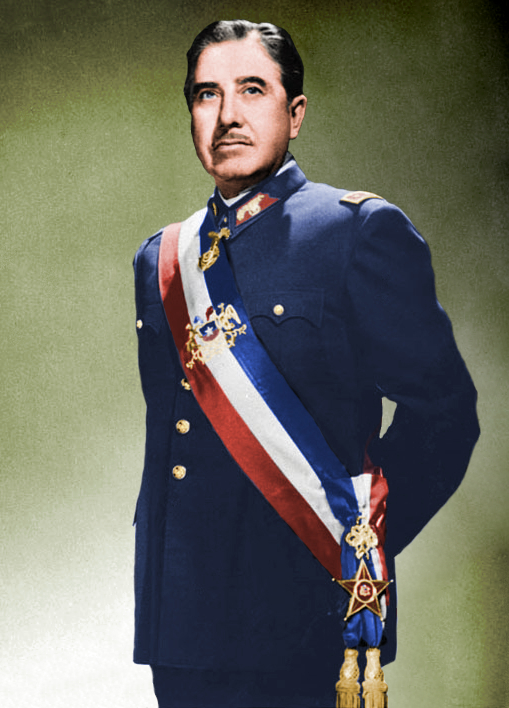
Official (colored) Portrait of Augusto Pinochet c. 1974

Space Invaders is set in the 20th century during the Military dictatorship of Chile (1973 - 1990). Under the brutal regime of General Augusto Pinochet, thousands of citizens were abducted, tortured, raped, and murdered. Missing person cases were common. After abduction by military forces, individuals were often taken to one of many detention centers and isolated from their relatives, where many were killed and secretly buried. Because relatives of these individuals were denied information about the death, these victims became commonly referred to as desaparecidos (the “disappeared”).

Fernandez's own childhood was spent under Pinochet's authoritarian regime. Consequently, many of the details in Space Invaders are true and directly extracted from Fernandez's personal memory, including the names of the characters. Estrella Gonzales, Maldonado, and the additional characters were all Fernandez's former classmates. Even the letters in the book are derived from the real letters written by Gonzales. Gonzales's father, too, was one of the killers in the Caso Degollados.

== Critical response ==
This book is praised for the combination of short chapters with multi-voiced narration used to invoke an unsettled feeling. This unsettled feeling paired with the use of unreliable dreams and memories is what reviewers felt reenacted for readers the feelings of people who are living under a repressive regime. One reviewer felt that the book's restraint in the overdramatization of brutal events is what contributed to its eerie feeling. The book is also praised for its use of the video game Space Invaders as a way to relate the events more readily to readers. It has been said that the book creates the same addictive attention that the video game did. Natasha Wimmer's translation is praised for retaining the tone, format, and flow of the original language without changing the meaning. The book was also longlisted for the National Book Award for Translated Literature in 2019.
