= Sex Life of Plants =

- Theatrical release poster
- Directed by: Sebastián Brahm
- Written by: Sebastián Brahm
- Produced by: Sebastián Brahm
- Starring: Mario Horton; Francisca Lewin
- Cinematography: Benjamín Echazarreta; Sergio Armstrong
- Edited by: Sebastián Brahm
- Music by: Santiago Farah; Tomás Gubbins
- Production companies: Escala Humana; Valcine S.A.
- Release dates: 21 September 2015 (SSIFF); 28 April 2016 (Chile)
- Running time: 94 minutes
- Country: Chile
- Language: Spanish

Sex Life of Plants (Spanish: Vida sexual de las plantas) is a 2015 Chilean romantic drama film written, directed, produced and edited by Sebastián Brahm. Starring Francisca Lewin and Mario Horton accompanied by Cristián Jiménez, Nathalie Nicloux, Gloria Laso, Ingrid Isensee and Gabriela Aguilera.

== Synopsis ==
After an accident turns Barbara's boyfriend into a complete stranger, she becomes involved with a man who offers her stability without passion. She tries to accept her new destiny but the memory of lost love torments her.

== Cast ==
The actors participating in this film are:

- Francisca Lewin as Bárbara
- Mario Horton as Guille
- Ingrid Isensee as Olaya
- Cristián Jiménez as Nils
- Nataly Varillas as Nati
- Gloria Laso as Cristina
- Gabriela Aguilera as Nancy
- Nathalie Nicloux as Lupe
- Alejandro Hernández as Juan
- Andrés Almeida as Andrés
- José Palma as Guy
- Bernardo Quesney as Zorrón
- Manuel Figueroa as Young Gardener
- Mauricio Dávila as Head Gardener

== Release ==
Sex Life of Plants had its world premiere on September 21, 2015, at the 63rd San Sebastián International Film Festival. It was commercially released on 28 April 2016, in Chilean theaters.

== Reception ==
=== Critical reception ===
Jay Weissberg from Variety wrote: "Sex Life of Plants maintains an atmosphere of hesitant expectation in which details may be left unspoken, yet psychological depth is satisfyingly pushed to the fore." Diego Brodersen from Página 12 highlights the performance of Francisca Lewin, since her acting work brings subtlety and ambiguity to a film that could easily have decided to be more explicit in terms of its content.

=== Accolades ===
Year	Award / Festival	Category	Recipient	Result	Ref.
2015	San Sebastián International Film Festival	New Directors Award - Special Mention	Sex Life of Plants	Won	
2017	Caleuche Awards	Best Leading Actress	Francisca Lewin	Nominated	
