= Francisco Pérez-Bannen =

Chilean film and television actor

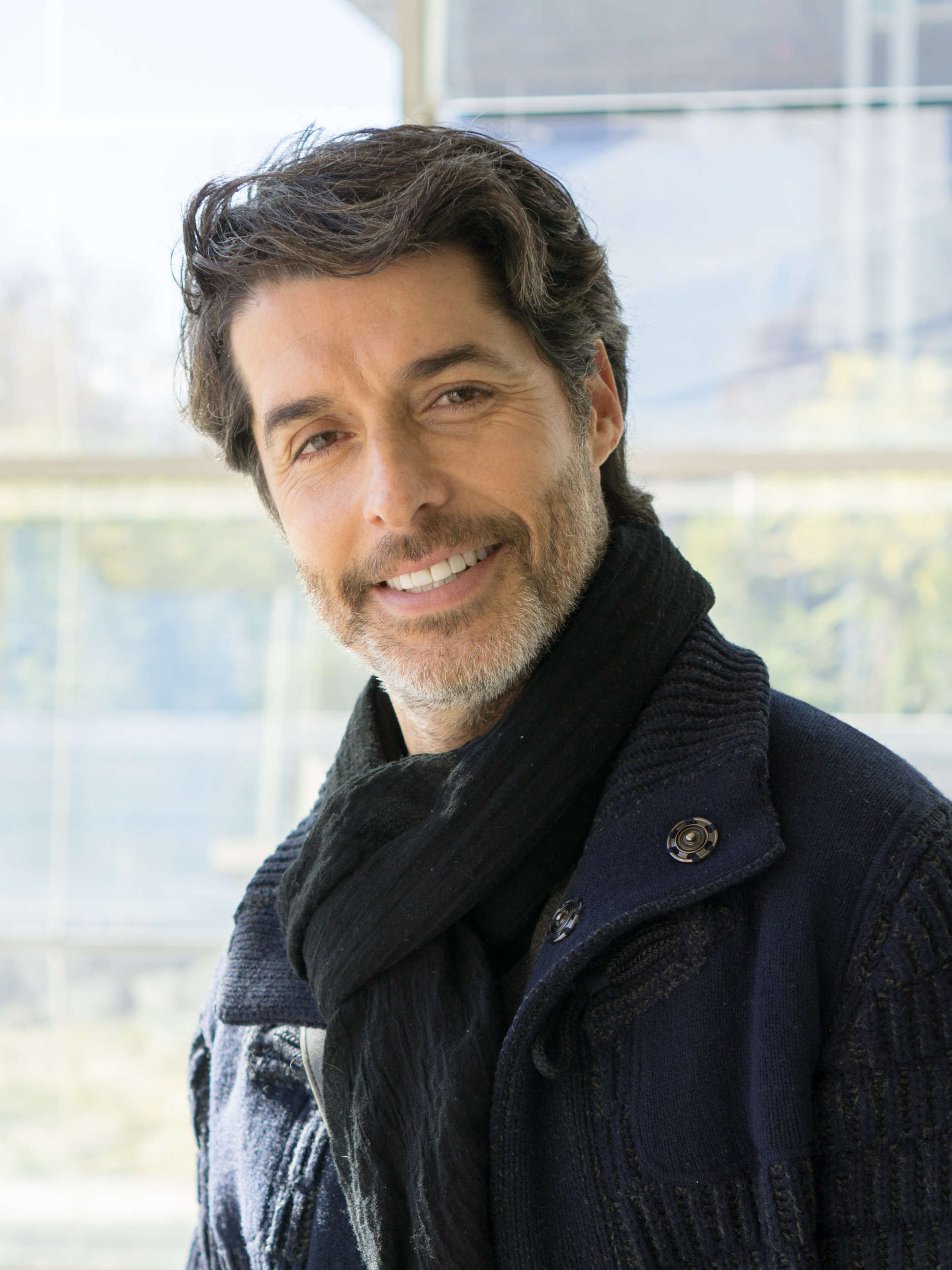
- Pérez Bannen in 2016
- Born: Francisco Pérez Bannen; January 16, 1971 (age 55); Santiago, Chile
- Occupations: Actor, television presenter
- Spouse: Paola Zanghellini (1997-2009)
- Children: 3

Francisco Pérez-Bannen (born Francisco Pérez Bannen on January 16, 1971, in Santiago) is a Chilean film and television actor.

== Biography ==
Pérez-Bannen studied at Colegio Verbo Divino school and in 1992 joined Escuela Fernando González to study acting. Years later he decided to unite his surnames Pérez (from his father's side) and Bannen (from his mother's side).

He debuted in television with the telenovela Loca Piel (1996) and is best known for his roles in Aquelarre, Alguien Te Mira and films like Sexo con Amor and Padre nuestro. Recently, Pérez-Bannen debuted as a television presenter with the theatre-comedy show Improvisa o Muere.

== Filmography ==
=== Films ===
- The True Story Of People In The Dragon (2024) - Himself
- Thursday Till Sunday (2012)
- Paréntesis (2005) - Camilo
- Padre nuestro (2005) - Roberto
- Mujeres Infieles (2004)
- Sexo con Amor (2003) - Valentín

=== TV series ===
- El Cuento del Tío (TVN, 2005) "El Ofertón" - Aníbal
- El Socio' (TVN, 2004) - Julián Pardo
- Te Llamabas Rosicler (TVN, 2002) - José Eduardo
- El Niño que Enloqueció de Amor (TVN, 1998) - Jorge
- Mi Abuelo mi Nana y Yo (TVN, 1998)

=== Telenovelas ===
TVN

- Loca Piel (1996) - Vicente Yávar
- Tic Tac (1997) - Nicolás Urrutia
- Borrón y Cuenta Nueva (1998) - Pascual Bianchi
- Aquelarre (1999) - Toro Mardones
- Santoladrón (2000) - Rodrigo Carpio
- Amores de Mercado (2001) - Jonathan Muñoz
- Purasangre (2002) - Manuel Figueroa
- Pecadores (2003) - Radamés Pérez Soto
- Destinos Cruzados (2004) - Gaspar Goycolea
- Versus (2005) - Juano Torrejón
- Cómplices (2006) - Guillermo Zavala
- Disparejas (2006) - Daniel Castro
- Alguien Te Mira (2007) - Benjamín Morandé
- Amor por Accidente (2007) - Gustavo Arancibia
- Hijos del Monte (2008) - José Del Monte
- Los Angeles de Estela (2009) - Danilo Escobar
- 40 y Tantos (2010) - Marco Elizalde
- Su Nombre es Joaquín (2011) - Alonso Montero
- Dama y Obrero (2012) - Julio Ulloa

=== Canal 13 ===
- Secretos en el Jardín (2013) - Ramiro Opazo
- My little dilemma (2014) - Sergio
- Veinteañero a los 40 (2015) - Francisco Javier Bustamante Lynch

=== TV shows ===
- Improvisa o Muere (TVN, 2010) - Host
