= 16 (TV series) =

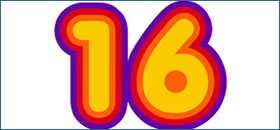
- Genre: Teen drama
- Created by: Marcelo Leonart; Nona Fernández
- Written by: Marcelo Leonart; Nona Fernández; Hugo Morales; Ximena Carrera
- Directed by: Víctor Huerta; Germán Barriga
- Starring: Cristián Arriagada; Francisca Lewin; Cristián Riquelme
- Theme music composer: Jorge del Campo Álvarez
- Country of origin: Chile
- Original language: Spanish
- No. of episodes: 98

Production
- Executive producer: Pablo Ávila Guerrero
- Producer: Daniela Demicheli
- Production location: Santiago, Chile
- Camera setup: Multi-camera
- Running time: 25–35 minutes

Original release
- Network: Televisión Nacional de Chile; TV Chile
- Release: 9 June – 22 October 2003

Related
- 17

16 (original title: Dieciséis) is a Chilean teen drama television series written by Marcelo Leonart. It premiered on Televisión Nacional de Chile on June 9, 2003, and concluded on October 22, 2003. The series stars Francisca Lewin and Cristián Arriagada.

Throughout the series, topics such as bullying, bulimia, and drug use are explored within the setting of a prestigious high school. Due to its success, a sequel series titled 17 was released, continuing the main storyline.

== Plot ==
After an intense summer break, a new school year begins at Antumapu High School. It's a time for students and teachers to reunite and welcome new members of the school community.

Magdalena Arias (Francisca Lewin), the principal's daughter, feels lonely but is thrilled when her cousin Matilde (Fernanda Urrejola) joins her class along with her friends Alejandra (Luz Valdivieso) and Canela (Isabel Ruiz) after their liberal private school went bankrupt. The group calls themselves "the witches." New classmates Fabiana (Antonella Orsini), Estrella (Francisca Tapia), and Ariela (Paola Giannini) also join.

The school year brings challenges as Manuel Arias (Willy Semler), the strict school principal and Magdalena's father, introduces new rules, such as segregating the school's common areas by gender. Magdalena and her friends lead a protest against these rules, which they see as oppressive.

While navigating these struggles, Magdalena faces personal conflicts, including falling in love with Nacho (Cristián Arriagada), a scholarship student and the janitor's son, despite dating Joaquín (Cristián Riquelme), the student council president. Her romance with Nacho sparks tension with her father, but Magdalena refuses to let social differences dictate her heart.

The lives of other characters at Antumapu High involve themes of love, jealousy, friendship, rebellion, and family relationships.

== Cast ==
- Francisca Lewin as Magdalena Arias
- Cristián Arriagada as Ignacio "Nacho" Vargas
- Cristián Riquelme as Joaquín Ortúzar
- Willy Semler as Manuel "Chacal" Arias
- Consuelo Holzapfel as Sofía Arias
- Alejandra Fosalba as Bárbara Torrent
- Juan Falcón as Román Espoz
- Fernanda Urrejola as Matilde Arias
- Juan José Gurruchaga as Darío Carmona
- Paola Giannini as Ariela Ortúzar
- Mauricio Inzunza as Álvaro Munizaga
- Luz Valdivieso as Alejandra Moretti
- Matías Oviedo as Pablo Arias
- Patricio Achurra as Demetrio Alquinta
- Lorene Prieto as Ester Costa
- Hugo Medina as Ambrosio Vargas
- Isabel Ruiz as Canela Talavera
- Antonella Orsini as Fabiana Tamayo
- Francisca Tapia as Estrella Toro
- Mario Gatica as Elías Santelices
- Liliana García as Oriana Fernández
- Patricio Strahovsky as Jaime Ortúzar
- Loreto Valenzuela as Mariana Del Canto
- Maité Fernández as Azucena Mora

== Production ==
The project was approved for the 2003 programming lineup by Televisión Nacional de Chile in October 2002. Jorge Marchant provided script consulting. The school scenes were filmed at the Patrocinio de San José School in Providencia.

== Phenomenon ==
This was the first Chilean telenovela designed for an early evening time slot, such as 5:30 PM. Its overwhelming success—achieving higher ratings than TVN's prime-time telenovelas of the season, Puertas adentro and Pecadores—led to its nearly immediate rerun in the summer of 2004 and the production of a sequel, titled 17, which aired in the summer of 2005. It also sparked TVN's interest in exploring new time slots for telenovelas, including nighttime programming starting in 2004. The telenovela stood out for portraying typical adolescent issues, such as bulimia, represented by Paola Giannini.

== Soundtrack ==
1. Jorge del Campo Álvarez - Divididos (Main Theme)
2. EM 3,14 - Al despertar (Nacho and Magdalena's Theme)
3. Marina Club - Keep on dancing (Pablo and Fabiana's Theme)
4. NTVG - No necesito nada (Darío and Matilde's Theme)
5. Miguel Bosé - Morena Mía (Manuel and Barbara's Theme)
6. Jarabe de Palo - Bonito (Darío's Theme)
7. Gonzalo Yáñez - Algún Día (Magdalena and Joaquín's Theme)
8. Daniela Castillo - Creo en ti
9. Fito Páez - El Amor Después Del Amor (Román and Ester's Theme)
10. Supernova - Herida (Alejandra's Theme)
11. Yahir - Alucinando (Álvaro and Canela's Theme)
12. Clan Rojo - Todo anda bien (Estrella's Theme)
13. Mai - Dónde estoy?
14. Canal Magdalena - Tú siempre tú
15. Lucybell - Ten Paz
16. Delisse - Un Rincón Escondido
17. Lucybell - Amanece (Magdalena and Joaquín's Theme)
18. Gabriel Yared - The Unfeeling Kiss
19. Sixpence None The Richer - Tension is a Passing Note
20. Jarabe De Palo - Ying Yang
21. Santo Barrio - Jaguar
22. Linkin Park - Breaking The Habit
23. Linkin Park - Somewhere I Belong
24. Linkin Park - Session
25. Linkin Park - Don't Stay
26. Daft Punk - Crescendolls
27. Deftones - Minerva
28. Gorillaz - Clint Eastwood
29. Red Hot Chili Peppers - The Zephyr Song
30. Linkin Park - Hit the Floor
31. The Chemical Brothers - Star Guitar
32. Nicole - Vida
33. Red Hot Chili Peppers - Cabron
34. Lucybell - Triángulo
35. Lucybell - Mi Corazón
