= Martín, el hombre y la leyenda =

- Genre: Biographical
- Created by: Rodrigo Cuevas
- Directed by: Juan Francisco Olea
- Starring: Gastón Salgado
- Country of origin: Chile
- Original language: Spanish
- No. of seasons: 1
- No. of episodes: 4

Production
- Executive producer: Cristóbal Zapata
- Camera setup: Multi-camera

Original release
- Network: Mega
- Release: 7 May – 10 May 2018

Martín, el hombre y la leyenda is a Chilean biographical miniseries written by Rodrigo Cuevas based on the life of Chilean boxer Martín Vargas. The series consists of 4 episodes and premiered on 7 May 2018, and ended on 10 May 2018. It stars Gastón Salgado as the titular character.

== Plot ==
The series delves into the life of the boxer Martín Vargas, who disputed four times the world title of El Peso de Mosca between 1977 and 1980, and enjoyed a fame rarely seen in the country, from his beginnings in Osorno until his rise to fame. In addition, his relationship with his wife Mireya Inostroza, his battles for the world title that paralyzed the country in the midst of the Military dictatorship of Chile (1973–1990), the difficult relationship with his manager Lucio Hernández, his fall and his subsequent redemption will be shown in the 90's.

== Cast ==
- Gastón Salgado as Martín Vargas
- Alfredo Castro as Lucio Hernández
- Mario Horton as Fernando Páez
- Lucas Bolvarán as Martín Adolfo Vargas
- Otilio Castro as Juan Peralta
- Alejandro Goic as Edgardo Valdebenito
- Francisca Lewin as Mireya Inostroza

== Ratings ==
Viewership and ratings per season of Martín, el hombre y la leyenda
Season	Episodes	First aired		Last aired		Avg. viewers (millions)	18–49 rank
Season	Episodes	Date	Viewers (millions)	Date	Viewers (millions)	Avg. viewers (millions)	18–49 rank
1	4	7 May 2018	17.1	10 May 2018	14.6	15.75	TBD

== Episodes ==
No.	Title	Directed by	Written by	Original release date	Chile viewers (millions)
1	"Episode 1"	Juan Francisco Olea	Rodrigo Cuevas	7 May 2018	17.1
Martín Vargas starts his career as a boxer, starting from Osorno to Santiago. Already in the capital, he will meet Lucío Hernández and Mireya, where his life will change completely.
2	"Episode 2"	Juan Francisco Olea	Rodrigo Cuevas	8 May 2018	15.6
There is no one who does not remember, in the 70's, how the promise of Chilean boxing, Martín Vargas, in just seconds, left his opponent in the ring. However, what seemed to be the pinnacle of a successful career, became major and significant problems that would mark his life forever.
3	"Episode 3"	Juan Francisco Olea	Rodrigo Cuevas	9 May 2018	15.7
The problems in Martin's life will increase, not only professionally, but also personally. Facts that will leave a great wound in the soul of Martin, who always dreamed of being world champion.
4	"Episode 4"	Juan Francisco Olea	Rodrigo Cuevas	10 May 2018	14.6
Martín Vargas was, for many, the light at the end of the tunnel, in the midst of the difficult moments, political and social, that Chile lived in the 70s. Their fights turned into great anecdotes, which will remain in the minds of those who met to see him in the ring, knocking out his opponent in seconds and, although he never fulfilled his dream, he became a true champion for Chile.
