= La Doña (2011 TV series) =

- Created by: Sergio Bravo
- Directed by: Vicente Sabatini
- Starring: Claudia Di Girólamo; Juan Falcón; Fernanda Urrejola
- Country of origin: Chile
- Original language: Spanish
- No. of seasons: 1
- No. of episodes: 92

Original release
- Network: Chilevisión
- Release: 4 October 2011 – 4 April 2012

La Doña is a 2011 Chilean telenovela produced and broadcast by Chilevisión.

== Cast ==
- Claudia Di Girólamo as Catalina De los Ríos-Lisperguer
- Juan Falcón as Cristobal Garcia de Leon
- Ricardo Fernández as Fernando Garcia de Leon
- Sofía García as Rosario Lisperguer
- Alfredo Castro as Pedro Lisperguer
- Cristián Carvajal as Domingo de Figueroa
- Fernanda Urrejola as Millaray Chalco
- Felipe Contreras as Nahuel Curiqueo
- Catalina Pulido as Perpetua Ximenez de Mendoza
- Alejandro Goic as Juan De la Cruz
- José Soza as Gonzalo De los Rios
- Luz Jiménez as Agueda Lisperguer
- Roxana Campos as Aileen Chalco
- Rodrigo Pérez as Asencio Erazo
- Javiera Hernández as Beatriz Ferreiro-Da Silva
- Paloma Moreno as Isadora Ximenez de Mendoza
- Antonio Campos as Nicolas Villarreal
- Nathalia Aragonese as Ancavilo
- Claudio Castellón as Manuncahua
- Felipe Ponce as Martin Ximenez de Mendoza
- José Tomás Rodríguez as Daniel Ferreiro-Da Silva

=== Special guests ===
- Sergio Hernández as Antonio Ximenez de Mendoza
- Alessandra Guerzoni as Elena Saavedra de Guzman
- Pablo Krögh as Benigno Martinez de Oviedo
- Paulo Brunetti as Enrique de Enríquez
