= Las 2 Carolinas =

- Genre: Dramedy
- Created by: Víctor Carrasco; Vicente Sabatini
- Written by: Andrea Franco; Fernando Delgado; Tomás Espinoza; Daniel Gijón
- Directed by: Vicente Sabatini
- Starring: Claudia Di Girolamo; Francisca Lewin; Pablo Cerda; Eduardo Paxeco; Ximena Rivas; Juan Falcón; Francisca Gavilán; Héctor Noguera
- Opening theme: Soy lo que soy
- Composer: Sandra Mihanovich
- Country of origin: Chile
- Original language: Spanish
- No. of seasons: 1
- No. of episodes: 136

Production
- Executive producer: Verónica Basso
- Producer: Cecilia Aguirre
- Production locations: Chilevision Studios. Macul, Santiago de Chile
- Running time: 60 minutes

Original release
- Network: Chilevisión
- Release: March 2, 2014 – present

Related
- Graduados

Las 2 Carolinas is a 2014 Chilean television series, directed and produced by Vicente Sabatini, which aired on Chilevisión from March 2, 2014, to September 12, 2014.

== Premise ==
Carolina Salazar Ibarra (Francisca Lewin) a hard-working young woman from a poor family, she gets a relevant position in the fashion world thanks to being mistaken for a wealthy woman with the same name: Carolina Salazar. This scope of name makes her selected in Greece, Spain, and Germany in Latin America in american-mexican an elegant boutique run by Sofia Parker (Claudia Di Girolamo), an authoritative boss who thinks she is employing the daughter of one of her friends. However, the brightness, the luxuries and the elegance, dazzle her and tempt her to accept a millionaire contract. Upon learning of the impersonation, the young woman will remain silent so as not to disappoint her family, excited about her new job, and also not to miss this opportunity, since her mother is about to lose the house due to a large number of debts. Thus, she will have to start a double life, certain that at some point she will be able to confess the truth.

== Cast ==
Actor/Actress	Character
Francisca Lewin	Carolina Salazar
Claudia Di Girolamo	Sofia Parker
Pablo Cerda	Martín Parker
Claudia Navarrete	Magdalena Fuentes
Eduardo Paxeco	Lautaro Martínez
Ximena Rivas	Rebeca Salazar
Juan Falcón	Wilson Vasquez
Isidora Urrejola	Lorena Salazar
Eyal Meyer	Max Parker
Francisca Gavilán	Jacqueline "Jackie" Duarte
Héctor Noguera	Rolando Vallejos
Luz Jiménez	Rosa Bahamondes
Sebastián Layseca	Jonathan "Johnny" Salazar
Daniela Palavecino	Alejandra Verdugo
Antonio Campos	Pablo Verdugo
Sofía García	Isidora Ruiz
Paloma Moreno	Carolina Salazar
Karla Melo	Carla Ferrada
Juan Maldonado	Fabricio Salazar
Claudio Castellón	Augusto "Pinocho" Vallejos
Constanza Poloni	Stephanie "Stefi" Salazar
Andrea García-Huidobro	Renata Saavedra
Luz María Yacominetti	Lucy Ferrada

=== Special participation ===
Actor/Actress	Character
Patricio Achurra	Luis "Lucho" Salazar
Silvia Santelices	Teresa Salazar
Consuelo Holzapfel	Estela Soto
Macarena Teke	Pamela Soto/Claudia Salazar
Rodrigo Soto	Brayathan Mendoza/Mark Mondaca
Mabel Farías	Carmen Verdugo
Víctor Rojas	Julio Verdugo
Gustavo Becerra	Delincuente
Heidrun Breier	Maestra espiritual
Elvis Fuentes	Antonio
Andrés San Martín	Patricio Navarro
Marina Salcedo	Coty Bustamante
