= Secretos en el jardín =

Chilean television series

- Title card
- Also known as: Secrets In The City
- Genre: Thriller
- Written by: Nona Fernández; Marcelo Leonart; Ximena Carrera; Simón Soto
- Directed by: Rodrigo Velásquez; Felipe Marchetti
- Starring: Francisco Pérez-Bannen; Antonia Zegers; Francisca Lewin; Mario Horton; Blanca Lewin
- Opening theme: "Ay amor" by Victor Manuel
- Country of origin: Chile
- Original language: Spanish
- No. of episodes: 101

Production
- Producer: Matías Ovalle
- Production location: Viña del Mar
- Camera setup: Single camera
- Running time: 55-90 minutes

Original release
- Network: Canal 13
- Release: 24 November 2013 – 9 June 2014

Related
- Soltera otra vez 2; Chipe Libre

Secretos en el jardín (lit: Secrets in the garden), also known as Secrets In The City, is a Chilean television series created by Julio Rojas and Matías Ovalle. Starring Francisco Pérez-Bannen, Antonia Zegers, Francisca Lewin, Mario Horton and Blanca Lewin, the series aired on Canal 13 from 24 November 2013, to 9 June 2014.

== Cast ==
=== Main cast ===
- Francisco Pérez-Bannen as Ramiro Opazo.
- Mario Horton as Javier Montes.
- Blanca Lewin as Bárbara Benoit.
- Cristián Campos as Hernán Jerez.
- Alejandro Goic as Carlos Alberto Cox.
- Daniela Ramírez as Sofia Ventura.
- Julio Milostich as Francisco O’Ryan.
- Néstor Cantillana as Juan Enrique Ramírez.
- Francisca Lewin as Raquel Lastra.
- Antonia Zegers as Magdalena Villanueva.

=== Supporting characters ===
- Mónica Godoy as Carmen Pereira.
- Jaime Vadell as Klaus Cox.
- Edgardo Bruna as Aníbal Lastra.
- Claudio Arredondo as Braulio Hernández.
- Francisca Gavilán as Romina Retamal.
- Roberto Farías as Luis Gutiérrez.
- Camila Hirane as Rosa Sepúlveda.
- Cristóbal Tapia Montt as Sergio O’Ryan.
- Antonella Orsini as Dolores O’Ryan.
- Rodrigo Soto as Emilio Fuentes.
- Catalina González as Ana Carrasco.
- Daniel Antivilo as Pablo Aguirre.
- Paloma Mena as Maura Alberty.
- Felipe Ponce as Claudio Jaramillo.
- Edinson Díaz as Roberto Quiñones.
- Jesús Herrera as Juanito Ramírez.

=== Guest appearances ===
- Daniela Lhorente as Luisa Cárdenas.
- Alejandro Trejo as Roberto Soto.
- Lucy Cominetti as Beatriz Urra.
- Pedro Vicuña as Darío.
- Isidora González as Fabiana Opazo.
- Héctor Aguilar as Ómar Raleff.
- Hernán Vallejo as Facundo Andrade.
- Francisca Castillo as Lorena.
- Alejandra Vega as Maritza.
- Daniel de la Vega as TV reporter.

== Reception ==
=== Television ratings ===
Ibope Media Ratings (Chile)
Original broadcast date		Day rank	Viewership
Series premiere	24 November 2013	1st	24%
Series finale	9 June 2014	2nd	15,6%
Average			11,6%
