= Cristián Jiménez =

Chilean filmmaker (born 1975)

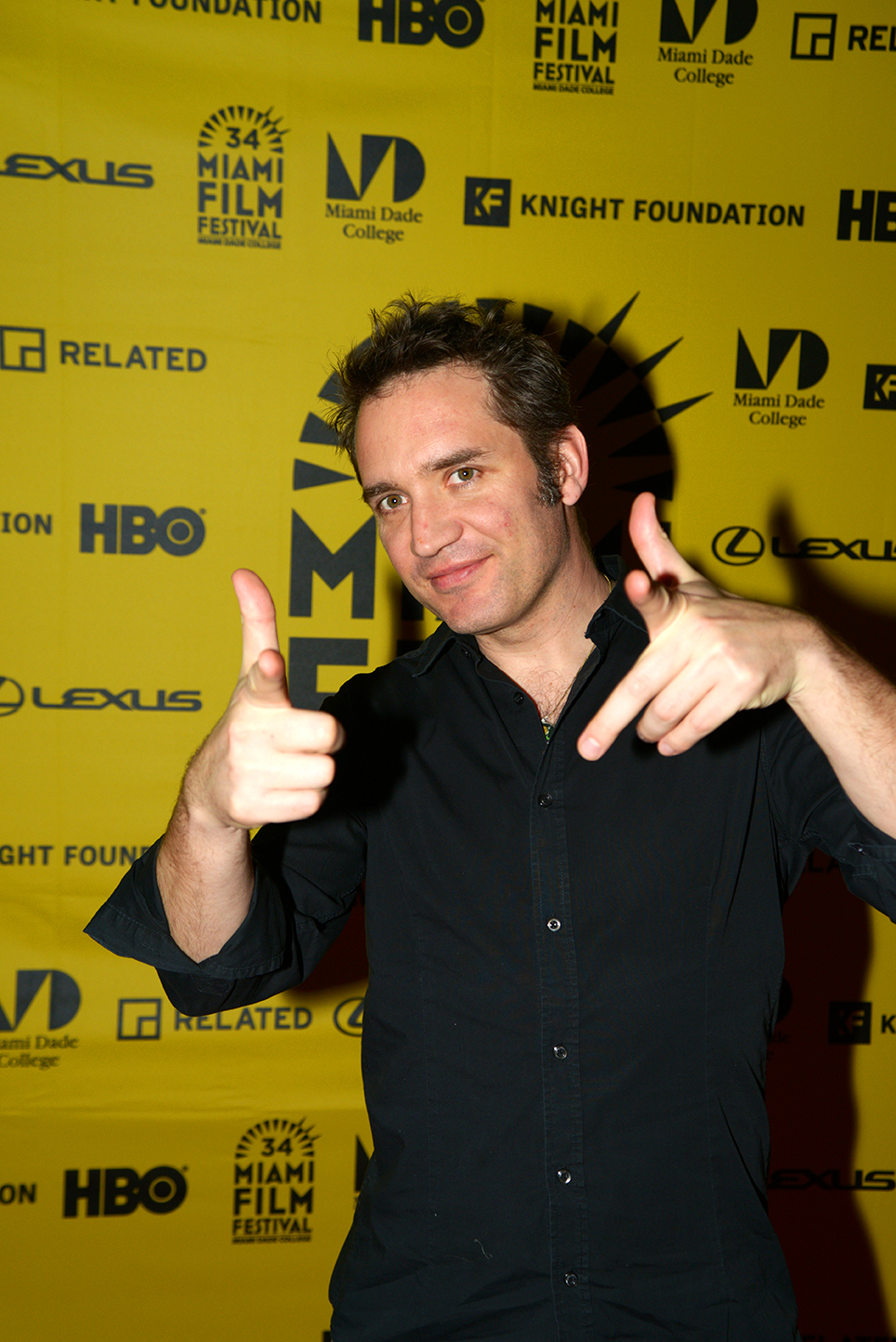
- Born: Valdivia
- Education: Pontifical Catholic University of Chile (B.A. in Sociology); Heidelberg University (M.A. in Sociology and Philosophy); London School of Economics (M.S. in Social sciences)
- Occupation: Film director

Cristián Jiménez (born 1975) is a filmmaker from southern Chile who is best known for low-key slacker dramas and dramedies. He won the 2013 Altazor Award for best direction for the TV series El Reemplazante.

== Select filmography ==
- 199 Tips to Be Happy (2008) - writer
- Optical Illusions (2009)
- Bonsai (2011)
- Voice Over (2014)
- Sex Life of Plants (2015) as Nils
- Family Life (2017; with Alicia Scherson)
