= Juan Falcón (actor) =

Chilean-Cuban actor

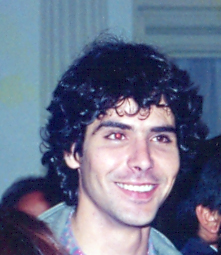
Falcón in 1997

Juan Falcón Marcial (born 27 April 1965) is a Chilean-Cuban actor.

Falcón was born in La Habana. He supports the Cuban Revolution, but settled in Chile in 1990 to live with his wife, the daughter of Chilean exiles who had fled their country after the 1973 military coup.

He is best known for his roles in Iorana, Romané and El circo de las Montini. In theatre, his participation in Sinvergüenzas is remembered.

== Filmography ==
=== Film ===
- Campo minado, nadie vuelve intacto (1998, directed by Alex Bowen), as Weinceslao.
- Maria Luisa en la niebla (1999, directed by Leo Kocking).
- Historias de sexo (2000, directed by Antonia Olivares).
- B-Happy (2003, directed by Gonzalo Justiniano), as Nelson.
- Gente mala del norte (2006, directed by Patricia Riquelme).

=== Television series ===
==== Canal 13 ====
- El palo al gato (1992) as Agustin.
- Top Secret (1994) as Ignacio.
- El amor está de moda (1995) as Adriano.
- Adrenalina (1996) as Elias.
- Brujas (2005) as Jason Estevez.
- Descarado (2006) as Mauro Montoya.
- Papi Ricky (2007) as Antonio Noriega.
- Cuenta Conmigo (2009) as Pedro "Mono" Gonzalez
- Feroz (2010) as Tomas Hernandez
- Primera dama (2010) as cameo
- Secretos de familia (2024) as Pedro Sotomayor Aguirre

==== Mega ====
- Rossabella (1997) as Jorge "Coke"
- Santiago City (1997) as Andrés.

==== TVN ====
- Iorana (1998) as Siu Teao.
- La Fiera (1999) as Marcos Chamorro.
- Romané (2000) as Branco.
- Pampa Ilusión (2001) as Alberto Quispe.
- El circo de las Montini (2002) as Isidro Martin.
- Puertas adentro (2003) as Daniel Henriquez.
- 16 (2003) as Roman Espoz.
- Los Pincheira (2004) as Delfin "Vinagre" Molina.
- Ídolos (2004) as Reinaldo Anderson.

=== Chilevision ===
- La Doña (2011) as Cristobal Garcia de Leon
- La Sexóloga (2012) as Eloy Garay
- Graduados (2013) as Fernando
- Las 2 Carolinas (2014) as Wilson Vasquez

=== Single TV series appearances ===
- Cuento de mujeres (TVN, 2003) in the episode "Berta/Angela" as Cristian/Bruno.
- El cuento del tío (TVN, 2004) in the episode "Hombre Soltero Busca" as Jose Miguel.
- Los simuladores (Canal 13, 2005) in the episode "Asalto espress" as Ángel Ponce.
- Dinastía Sa-Sa (Canal 13, 2006) as Jason Estevez.
- Héroes (Canal 13, 2007).
- La divina comida (Chilevisión, 2017) as a guest.
