= Francisca Lewin =

Chilean actress (born 1980)

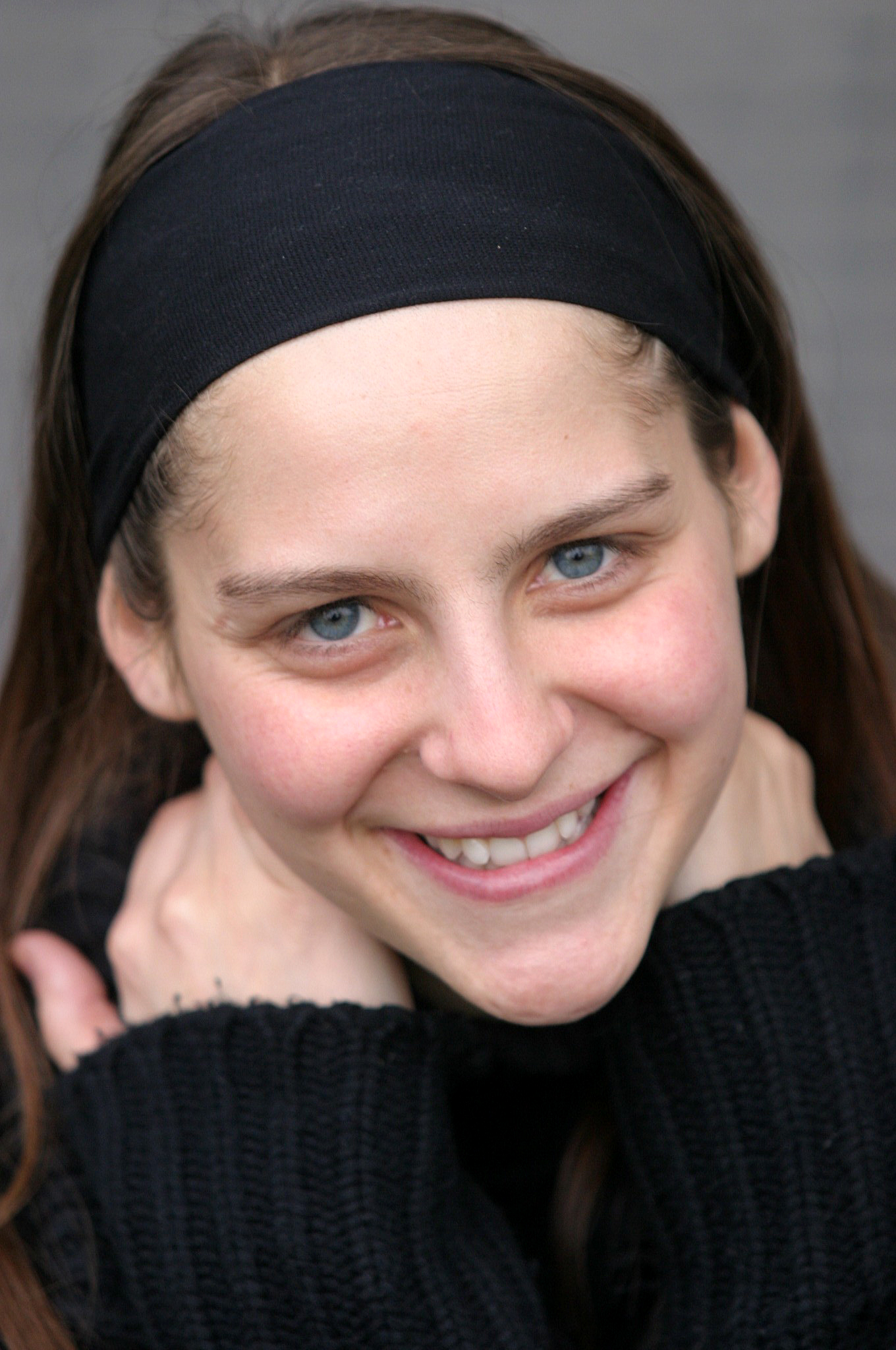
- In 2005
- Born: María Francisca Lewin Castellano; 26 September 1980 (age 45); Santiago, Chile
- Education: Pontifical Catholic University of Chile
- Occupation: Actress
- Political party: Democratic Revolution
- Partner: Guillermo Calderón
- Mother: Ángela Castellano
- Relatives: Blanca Lewin (cousin)
- Awards: APES Award (2005)

María Francisca Lewin Castellano (born 26 September 1980) is a Chilean film, theater, and television actress.

== Early life and education ==
Francisca Lewin was born in Santiago in 1980, the daughter of Ángela Castellano, a professor at the Pontifical Catholic University's School of Nursing. She is the distant cousin of actress Blanca Lewin.

She studied acting at the Theater School of the Pontifical Catholic University, graduating in October 2002, with the production Hombre pobre todo es trazas by Pedro Calderón de la Barca.

== Television and film career ==
A year after graduating, Lewin landed a leading role in the TVN youth telenovela titled 16. She later appeared in its sequel, 17.

In 2005, she joined TVN, to play Doménica Capo in the Italian immigrant television series Los Capo. For this performance, she received the APES Award for Best Supporting Actress.

Also that year, she acted in the Alberto Fuguet film Se arrienda, alongside Luciano Cruz-Coke. The film premiered in October 2005 at the Valdivia International Film Festival. In an interview on the Canal 13 morning show Viva la mañana, in its entertainment segment, Alfombra roja, Lewin said:

The first time I saw the complete film was in Valdivia, but I only dedicated myself to analyzing it. The second time was different and I enjoyed it. I followed the story of Luciano, everything that happened to him, and I liked it a lot.

She established herself in soap operas in 2006, playing the ambitious Andrea Riquelme in the successful Cómplices, a role that took Lewin out of her previous roles as a "tender" girl.

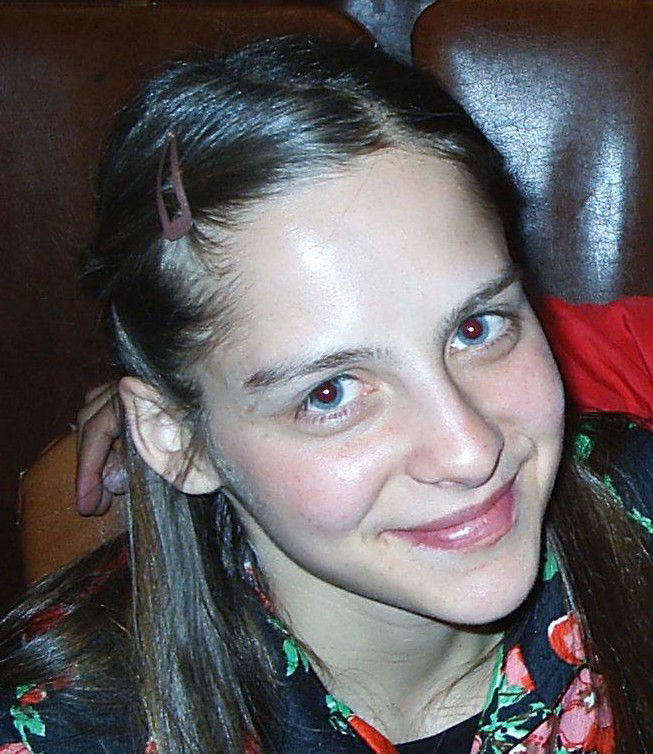
Lewin at a short film festival in Punta Arenas

In 2007, she appeared in three television projects on the state channel. Corazón de María is a telenovela in which Lewin plays a young transplanted woman, Elisa, who has a complicated family history. Mi primera vez is an anthology series that revolves around the loss of virginity of its protagonists. In it, Francisca appears in the chapter "Gonzalo", where the protagonist, played by Matías Oviedo, is a virgin schoolboy who tries to persuade his girlfriend (Lewin), also a virgin, to have sex. Finally, she appeared in the sitcom Hotel para dos, directed by Nicolás Acuña, where she plays a teenager who inherits a hotel, along with her mother, her stepsister, and the latter's mother.

In 2008, she joined the cast of the telenovela Viuda Alegre, where she played the role of Javiera Balmaceda/Sabina Díaz.

On 18 June 2009, the film Teresa, starring Lewin and directed by Tatiana Gaviola, was released in theaters.

In the same year, Francisca starred with Álvaro Rudolphy in the nightly television series Conde Vrolok, playing Emilia Verdugo.

In 2010, she starred in La familia de al lado, a production in which she portrays Carola Fabres, the black sheep of the Fabres family and lives in the shadow of her older sister, Ignacia. "The parents do not treat Carola well, not like Ignacia, who has always been her favorite. That is why she rebels and takes refuge in alcohol and drugs," Lewin explained.

In 2011, she dedicated herself fully to theater in the Guillermo Calderón play Villa+Discurso, and in 2012 she appeared in the feature film Educación física with Pablo Cerda.

In 2014, Lewin continued her professional rise with Las 2 Carolinas, directed by Vicente Sabatini. She played Carolina Salazar, the innocent young woman who arrives in Las Condes to work as a personal assistant to the voracious and ruthless owner of a fashion store.

== Advertising ==
During 2006, Lewin ventured into advertising, becoming one of the main faces of the Ripley department store.

In 2007, she was hired by Ingesa S.A. to be the face of Skechers sneakers, a position previously held by actress Carolina Varleta. The manager of Ingesa commented that Lewin was chosen because she is "talented, charismatic, and arouses great sympathy among the youth. She is close to the people, simple, and far from show business."

== Personal life ==
In May 2016, Lewin voiced her support for the Democratic Revolution party.

In March 2018, she announced that she was having her first child with her partner, the actor and dramatist Guillermo Calderón.

== Filmography ==
=== Films ===
Year	Title	Role	Director
2004	Crescendo (short)	Amanda	
2004	No me toques (short)	Yezarela	Mauro Bravo
2005	Se arrienda	Elisa	Alberto Fuguet
2009	Teresa	Teresa Wilms Montt	Tatiana Gaviola
2010	Velódromo	Claudia Santa Ana	Alberto Fuguet
2012	Educación física	Emiliana	Pablo Cerda
2012	Réquiem	Margarita	Camilo Chicahuale
2013	Agua	Malena	Álvaro Rudolphy
2015	Sex Life of Plants	Barbara	Sebastián Brahm

=== TV series ===
Year	Title	Role	Episode	Director
2001	Enigma	Cecilia	"Trágico agosto"	
2002	Enigma	Isabel	"Triste Domingo"	
2003	Mea Culpa	Viviana Garay	"El Taxi"	
2003	Cuentos de mujeres	Camila	"Camila"	
2003	16	Magdalena Arías		Víctor Huerta
2005	17	Magdalena Arías		Víctor Huerta
2005	Los Capo	Doménica Capo		Vicente Sabatini
2006	Cómplices	Andrea Riquelme		Patricio González
2006	Tiempo final: en tiempo real	Karina	"Pleno centro"	
2007	Corazón de María	Elisa Lamarca		Patricio González
2007	Mi primera vez	Carolina	"Gonzalo"	Marcelo Ferrari
2007	Hotel para dos	Paula Plaza		Nicolás Acuña
2008	Viuda Alegre	Javiera Balmaceda/Sabina Díaz		Patricio González
2009–2010	Conde Vrolok	Emilia Verdugo		Víctor Huerta
2010	La familia de al lado	Carola Fabres		Víctor Huerta
2013–2014	Secretos en el jardín	Raquel Lastra		Rodrigo Velásquez
2014	Las 2 Carolinas	Carolina Salazar		Vicente Sabatini
2017	Ramona	Soledad Ortúzar		Andrés Wood
2018	Martín, el hombre y la leyenda	Mireya Inostroza		Juan Francisco Olea
2021	No nos quieren ver	Colomba Ulloa		Guillermo Helo

=== TV programs ===
Year	Title	Role	Channel
2014	15th Viña del Mar International Song Festival	Juror	Chilevisión

== Theater ==
Year	Title	Author	Role	Theater	Ref.
2002	Hombre pobre todo es trazas				
2002	Romeo and Juliet	William Shakespeare	Juliet		
2003	An Enemy of the People	Henrik Ibsen	Petra	Teatro Tobalaba	
2006	A View from the Bridge	Arthur Miller	Catherine	Teatro del Parque	
2007	Todo es distinto de cómo tú piensas	Carlos Fernández Shaw			
2008–2009	Clase	Guillermo Calderón		Centro Mori	
2009	Three Sisters	Anton Chekhov	Irina	Teatro de la Palabra	
2011	Villa+Discurso	Guillermo Calderón			
2013	Escuela	Guillermo Calderón		Teatro UC	
2016	Un cuento de navidad	Álvaro Viguera	Belle		
2019	Dragón	Guillermo Calderón		Teatro UC	

== Awards and nominations ==
Year	Award	Category	Production	Result	Ref.
2004	APES Award	Best Acting Performance	16	Nominated	
2005	APES Award	Best Supporting Actress	Los Capo	Winner	
2005	Guachaca Queen	Most Popular Female Character	Cómplices	Nominated	
2005	Altazor Award	Best Film Actress	Se arrienda	Nominated	
2009	Altazor Award	Best Theater Actress	Clase	Nominated	
2017	Caleuche Awards	Best Leading Film Actress	Sex Life of Plants	Nominated	
