= Nona Fernández =

Chilean actress, author, and screenwriter

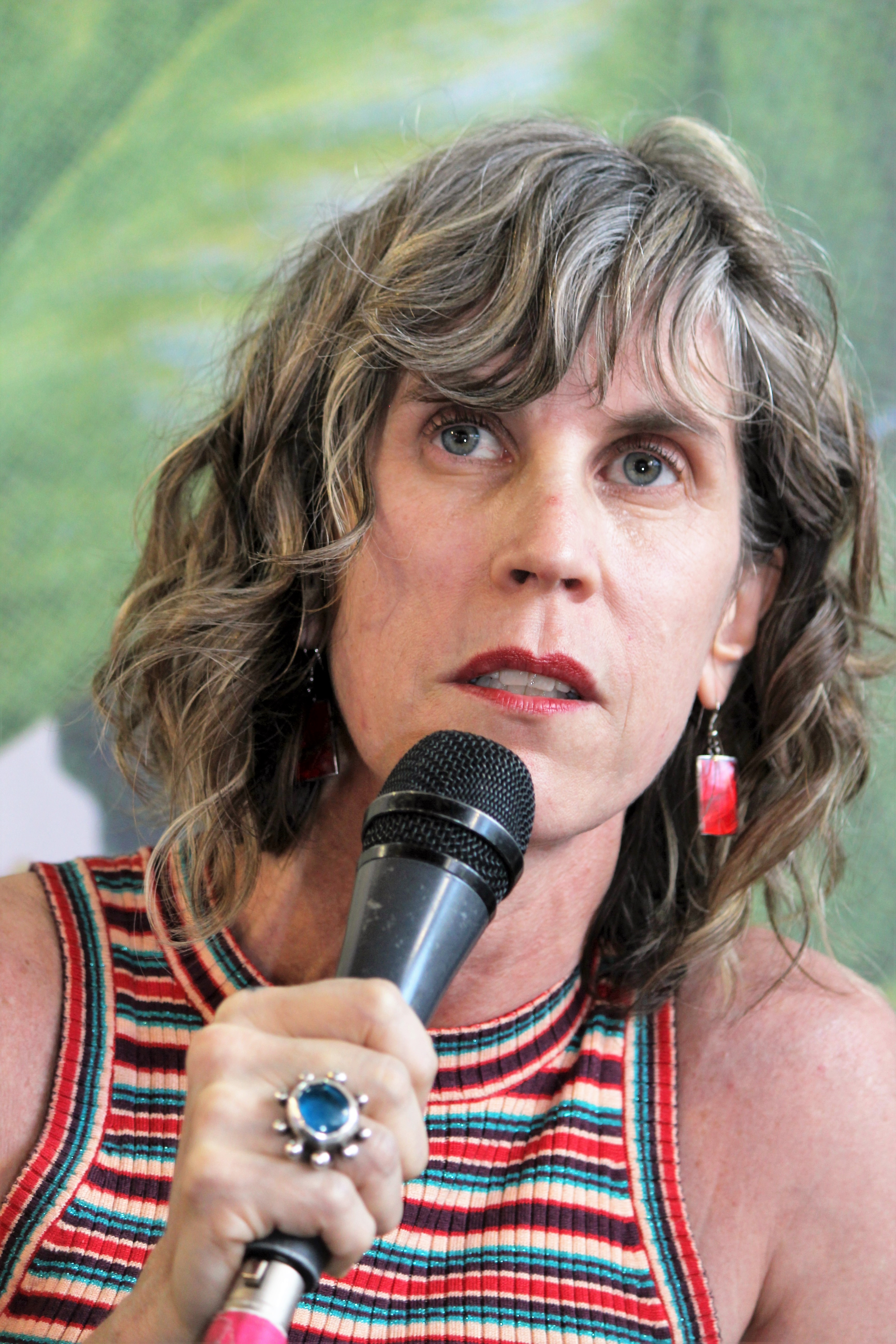
- At FILSA 2018
- Born: Patricia Paola Fernández Silanes; 23 June 1971 (age 54); Santiago, Chile
- Occupations: Actress, writer
- Notable work: Av. 10 de Julio Huamachuco, La dimensión desconocida
- Spouse: Marcelo Leonart
- Awards: Santiago Municipal Literature Award (2003, 2008); Altazor Award (2006, 2008, 2012, 2013); Sor Juana Inés de la Cruz Prize (2017)

Patricia Paola Fernández Silanes (born 23 June 1971), better known as Nona Fernández, is a Chilean actress, author, and screenwriter. She is a recipient of the Sor Juana Inés de la Cruz Prize, and the Altazor prize (on many occasions).

== Biography ==
An only child of a single mother, Nona Fernández grew up in a Matta Avenue neighborhood close to the market Persa Bíobío. There she had her first job, selling second-hand clothes.

Even though her name is the same as her mother's, Patricia Paola, everyone calls her Nona, the name by which she also signs her works. When she was just starting to walk, she used to talk little, hardly saying anything. All she could say was 'no'. Turning this negative into her child's pet word earned her the peculiar nickname "Nonito" among her family. When she got older, the nickname became Nona.

She attended Santa Cruz School in Santiago and later the Catholic University Theater School.

Later, as an actress, she founded the company Merri Melodys, participated in productions of many theatrical works, and won a competition of the Centro Chileno-Norteamericano de Cultura as the best actress.

In 1995, she participated in a workshop given by Antonio Skármeta, the same year she won the Gabriela Mistral Literary Games. Her stories were first published in various anthologies of contests, and her first book of short stories, El Cielo, was published in 2000. Her award-winning novel Mapocho was published two years later.

Regarding the genesis of that first novel, she states:

I wrote my first novel in an apartment in Barcelona, staring at Chile from afar, filling pages with wild interpretations of its national history, while my belly grew with a child seeking space. At the same time I gave birth to my son I finished the book. The name of my son is Dante. The book was named Mapocho, like the river that crosses my city, the same one that has moved garbage and corpses since always.

Fernández has been included by some critics in the so-called Literatura de los hijos.

Her husband, Dante's father, is the writer and theatre director Marcelo Leonart, whom she met when they were both studying at the Theatre School. Together they run the company La Fusa.

Nona describes herself with these words: "Actress for fun. Narrator for being a nuisance, trying not to forget what should not be forgotten. Scriptwriter for soap operas because of necessity. An uncomfortable Chilean, and sometimes rabid".

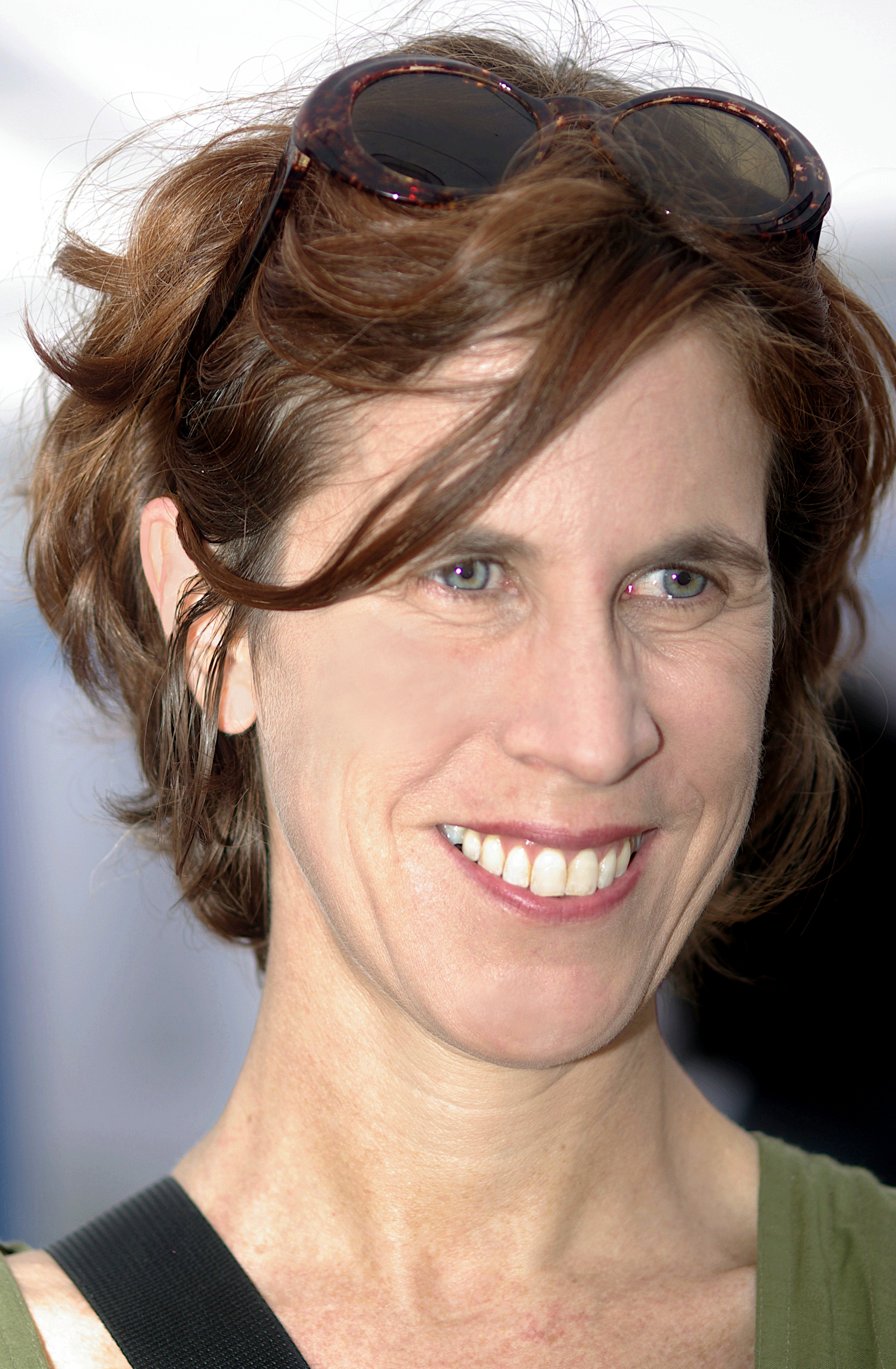
At the Book Festival in Santiago's Plaza de Armas, 2013

Her work as a screenwriter for TV series is for Nona Fernández only a way to make a living. On TVN, she has become the scriptwriter for El laberinto de Alicia. Also, she contributes to the series Los archivos del cardenal, based on the cases defended by the Vicariate of Solidarity during Augusto Pinochet's dictatorship. She also co-wrote Andrés Waissbluth's film 199 recetas para ser feliz (199 Tips to be Happy) and the documentary La ciudad de los fotógrafos (City of Photographers) by Sebastián Moreno.

She was selected in 2011 along with two other Chileans: Diego Muñoz Valenzuela and Francisco Díaz Klaassen as one of the "25 literary treasures waiting to be discovered", writers "whose talent has been consolidated in their countries, but who are still not well known outside them", by the Guadalajara International Book Fair in celebration of its 25 years of existence.

She made her debut as a playwright in 2012, with El taller, a play inspired by the literary salon that Mariana Callejas held in her home in Lo Curro while her husband, Michael Townley, directed the underground operations of a DINA headquarters. This black comedy performed by Leonart and Fernández's company, La Fusa, premiered in April at the Santiago theater Lastarria 90 and re-shown in August at the Centro Cultural Gabriela Mistral. It won the Premio Altazor 2013 in the Theater art category. Her second piece, Liceo de niñas, premiered in 2015 (with this, the company led by Nona and Leonart is now called Pieza Oscura); it is "a fantastic comedy about an overwhelmed science teacher who discovers in his school's laboratory three students who have been hidden since a 1985 protest occupation."

== Works ==
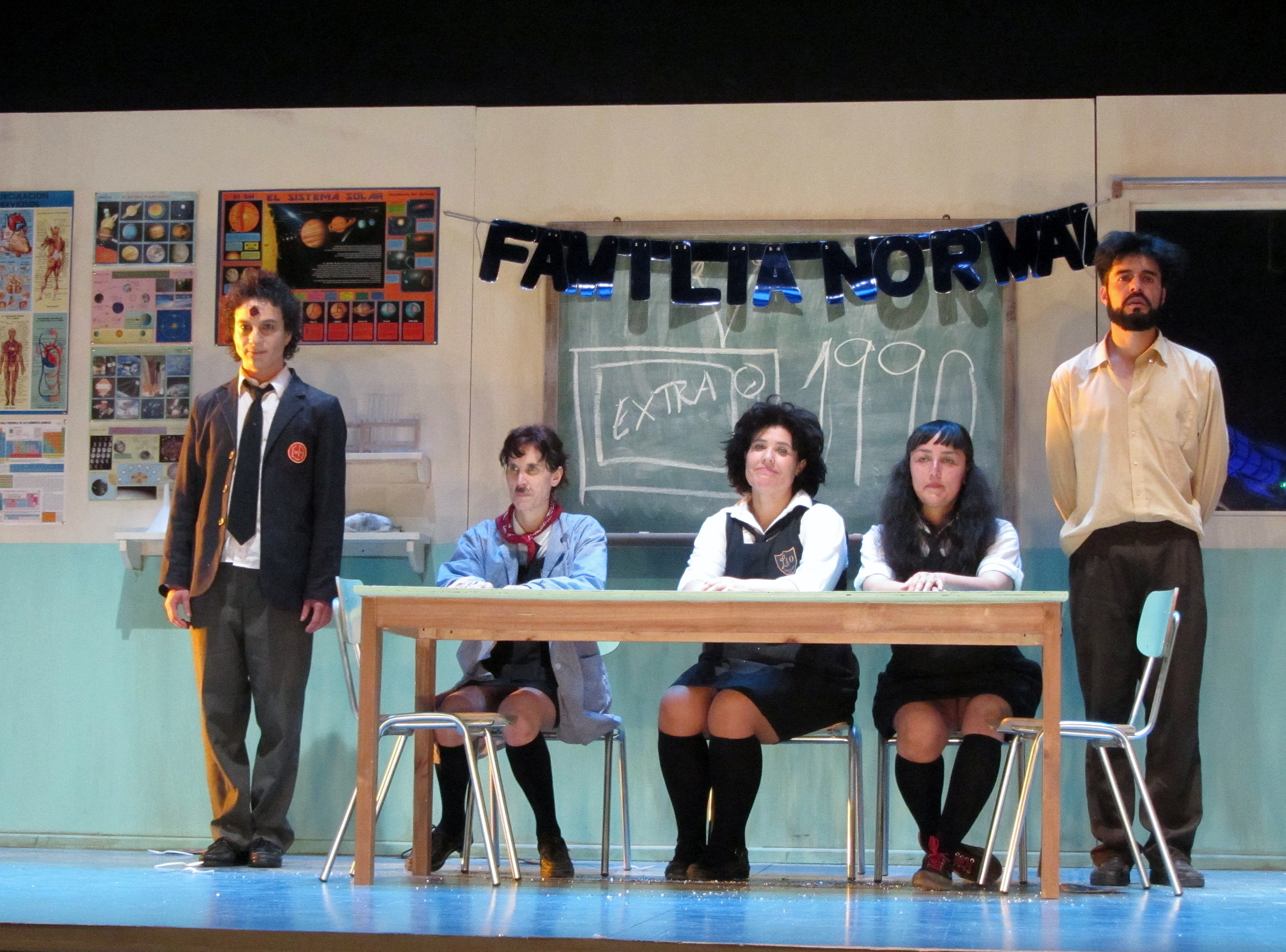
Greetings from the actors at the end of the Liceo de niñas piece (Fernández is seated left), 9 December 2015

=== Novels ===
- 2002: Mapocho, Planeta

A novel that portrays, through different symbols and metaphors, Chile's biography and the role of the Official History as a speech of power on the structuring of an identity.

- 2007: Av. 10 de Julio Huamachuco, Uqbar

Work that represents classic children's fears that most of the time cross the time barrier and continue tormenting until adulthood.

- 2012: Fuenzalida, Mondadori, Santiago

A maze of fantastical stories that intertwine with one another and suggest that is impossible to close the eyes before memories, be they personal or collective.

- 2013: Space invaders, Alquimia, Santiago.

Dreams of a generation turned into nightmares that until today torture them at night. Dreams of children that witnessed Pinochet's dictatorship.

- 2015: Chilean Electric, Alquimia, Santiago

A novel to understand and explore family history, turning it into an illumination of the "fearsome darkness" that has reigned in the history of Chile with its missing, murdered, and hanged men. A novel inspired, at the same time, by wooden horses, a typewriter, and the corpse of a president who said, "more passion and more affection."

- 2016: La dimensión desconocida, Penguin Random House, Santiago 2021 The Twilight Zone (English Translation) Graywolf Press

In the middle of the Chilean dictatorship, an anguished man arrives at the offices of an opposition magazine. He is an agent of the secret service. "I want to speak", he says, and a journalist turns on her voice recorder to listen to a testimony that opens the doors to a hitherto unknown dimension.

=== Memoir ===
- Fernández, Nona (2023). Voyager. Graywolf Press. ISBN 978-1-64445-217-2. Translated by Natasha Wimmer,

=== Short stories ===
- 2000: El Cielo, Cuarto Propio. Santiago

Seven stories marked by love and redemption or redemption through love. Stories where rules do not exist, everything counts, and everyone counts. What is important is that no one is actually more important. Everyone has a place, a niche, a heaven to go to.

=== In anthologies ===
- 1994: Música ligera (Grijalbo)
- 1996: Pasión por la música (Lom)
- 1997: Cuentos extraviados (Alfaguara; with "Blanca")
- 1998: Queso de cabeza y otros cuentos (with "El Cielo")

=== Theatrical dramas ===
- El taller: released in April 2012; published in the book Bestiario, freakshow temporada 1973/1990, together with Grita (2004, by Marcelo Leonart) and Medusa (2010, by Ximena Carrera): Ceibo Ediciones, Santiago, 2013
- Liceo de niñas: released on 23 October 2015 by the company Pieza Oscura at the Theater of the Catholic University, with direction by Marcelo Leonart and acting by the author, among others, who plays the role of a mute student. Published by Ediciones Oxímoron in 2016.

=== Television series scripts ===
==== Original stories ====
- 2011: El Laberinto de Alicia (rewritten in 2014 as the Colombian series El laberinto de Alicia with Tania Cárdenas and Santiago Ardila)
- 2005: Los treinta (with Marcelo Leonart, Hugo Morales, and Ximena Carrera)
- 2003: 16 (with Marcelo Leonart)

==== Adaptations ====
- 2013: Secretos en el jardín – originally by Julio Rojas y Matías Ovalle
- 2011: Los archivos del cardenal – originally by Josefina Fernández
- 2009: Conde Vrolok – originally by Rodrigo and Felipe Ossandón, and Jorge Ayala
- 2009: ¿Dónde está Elisa? – originally by Pablo Illanes
- 2007: Alguien te mira – originally by Pablo Illanes
- 2004: 17 – originally by Marcelo Leonart
- 2002: El circo de las Montini – originally by Víctor Carrasco
- 1999: Aquelarre – originally by Hugo Morales
- 1998: Iorana – originally by Enrique Cintolesi

== English translations ==
- Space Invaders. Translated by Natasha Wimmer. Minneapolis, MN: Graywolf Press, 2019. ISBN 978-1-64445-007-9
- The Twilight Zone. Translated by Natasha Wimmer. Minneapolis, MN: Graywolf Press, 2021. ISBN 978-1-64445-047-5

== Awards and recognitions ==
- 1995: First place of the Gabriela Mistral Literary Games, for the story "Marsellesa"
- 1996: First prize in the Passion for Music literary contest
- 1997: Finalist in the Paula magazine story contest, for "Blanca"
- 1998: Finalist in Paula magazine story contest, for "El Cielo"
- 2000: Finalist for the Altazor Award in the TV Script category with Aquelarre (ex aequo)
- 2003: Santiago Municipal Literature Award for Mapocho
- 2004: Finalist for the Altazor Award in the TV Script category with 16 (ex aequo)
- 2006: Altazor Award in the TV Script category for Los treinta (ex aequo)
- 2008: Altazor Award in the TV Script category for Alguien te Mira (ex aequo)
- 2008: Santiago Municipal Literature Award for Av. 10 de Julio Huamachuco
- 2010: Finalist for the Altazor Award in the TV Script category with Conde Vrolok (ex aequo)
- 2010: Finalist for the Altazor Award in the TV Script category with ¿Dónde está Elisa? (ex aequo)
- 2012: Altazor Award in the TV Script category for Los archivos del cardenal (ex aequo)
- 2013: Altazor Award in the Dramaturgy category for El taller
- 2016: Award of the National Council of Culture and the Arts for the best novel in the Published Works category for Chilean Electric
- 2017: Sor Juana Inés de la Cruz Prize for La dimensión desconocida
- 2019: Longlisted for the 2019 National Book Award for Translated Literature.
- 2021: Finalist for the 2021 National Book Award for Translated Literature.
- 2022: Longlisted for the 2022 Andrew Carnegie Medal for Excellence in Fiction.
