= Ictus Theatre =

- Interactive map of Ictus Theatre

Construction
- Opened: 1955

Teatro Ictus or ICTUS (Ictus Theatre) is the longest-running independent theatre company in Chile. A not-for-profit private company, Ictus was founded in 1955 and is known for its creative works with strong political-social commentary.

Of particular note is the work Lindo país esquina con vista al mar (“Beautiful country on the corner with sea views”), premiered in 1979 at the height of the military dictatorship, with its humorous take on Chilean society as it underwent economic reform amidst political repression. More recent works include Levántate y corre (“Get up and run”) and Alguien tiene que parar (“Someone has to stop”).
