= Luz Valdivieso =

Chilean actress

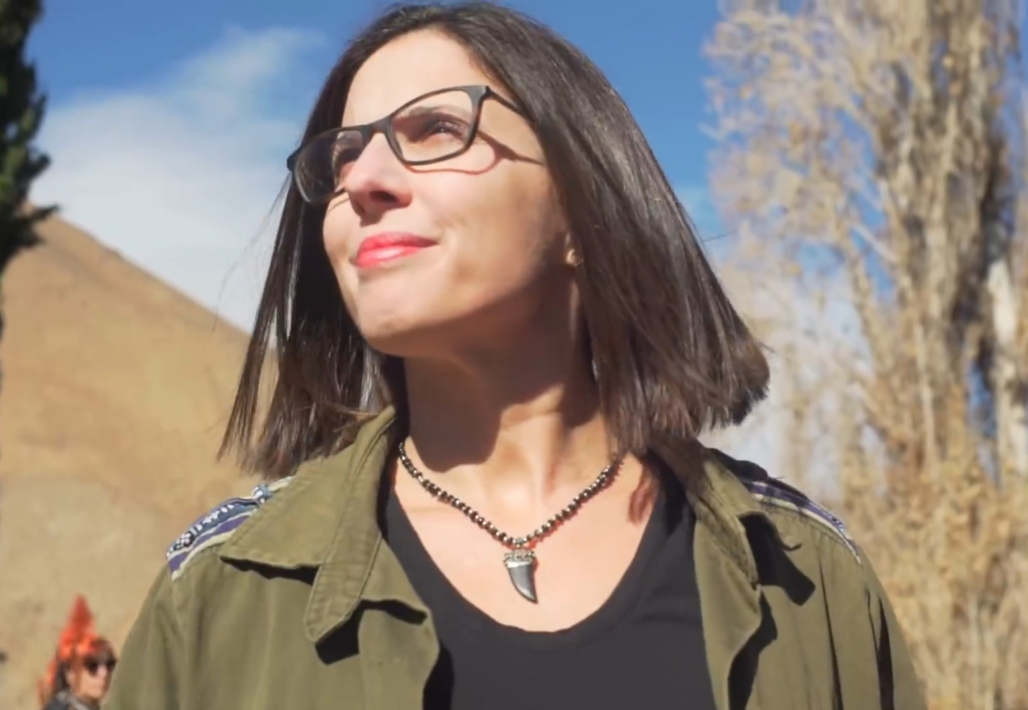
- Luz Valdivieso
- Born: Luz María Valdivieso Ovalle; July 1, 1977 (age 48); Santiago, Chile
- Occupation: Actress
- Spouse: Marcial Tagle (m. 2005)
- Children: María Tagle (b. 2008); Marcial Jr. Tagle (b. 2011)

Luz María Valdivieso Ovalle (born July 1, 1977) is a Chilean actress.

== Early life ==
Luz María Valdivieso Ovalle was born in Santiago, Chile. She went to study at Colegio Institución Teresiana and later entered the University of Chile to study psychology for two years. While at the university she realized that she wanted a career in acting. She put her career on hold to try her luck at the School of Teatro de Gustavo Meza and by the end of the first year of theater, she decided to stay there.

== Television career ==
Her first telenovela was in Piel Canela (Cinnamon-toned skin), as Anita Moreno. Next she played her first antagonistic role, Estefania, in the telenovela Buen Partido (Good game), alongside Cristián Arriagada, a complicated moment for the drama division of Channel 13.

Later TVN asked for her to join the new telenovela Juvenil 16, where she played an impulsive girl named Alejandra.

After Juvenil 16, she joined the cast of the first night-time telenovela Ídolos (Idols), where she played a young rebel named Natalia Medina. It involved a love conflict with her father, played by Eduardo Barril, and her best friend. Her acting skills brought her much attention. Following Ídolos, she joined the cast of Juvenil 17 y later, the second night-time telenovela Los Treinta (The Thirties) playing Simona, a married woman who decides to leave her husband (Álvaro Espinoza) and her son in order to regain her liberty.

Her notoriety gained here a role in a major telenovela on TVN named Versus, playing her second antagonistic role as Vanesa Carrera, a young girl who fights for the love of Octavio Cox (Cristián Arriagada).

She went on to make special appearances in the night-time series Disparejas (Different) as Javiera, a woman who represents Francisco Pérez-Bannen.

== Movie career ==
Valdivieso's first film role came in 2004 in a film called No me toques (Don't touch me), along with Carmen Gloria Bresky, Sebastian Layseca, Francisca Lewin, Juan Pablo Ogalde and Benjamín Vicuña; under the direction of Mauro Bravo.

Her second film role came in La remolienda (The binge) which was released in 2007.

== Personal life ==
She is married to Marcial Tagle, who acts in the series Casado con Hijos on MEGA.

== Filmography ==
Film roles
Year	Title	Role	Notes
2004	Don't Touch Me		Short film
2006	Casa de remolienda	Isaura	
2007	Life Kills Me	Andrea	
2010	Sobre La Mesa	Elvira	Short film
2012	Caleuche	Amanda	
2013	El Derechazo	Carolina Tomá	

Television series roles
Year	Title	Role	Notes
2001	Piel Canela	Ana Moreno	Soap Opera
2002	Buen Partido	Estefanía Roberts	Soap Opera
2003	16	Alejandra Moretti	Television series
2004	Ídolos	Natalia Medina	Soap Opera
2005	17	Alejandra Moretti	Television series
2005	Los Treinta	Simona Bórquez	Soap Opera
2005	Versus	Vanessa Carrera	Soap Opera
2006	Disparejas	Javiera	Soap Opera
2006	Tiempo Final	Cynthia	Television series (1 episode)
2006	Floribella	Agustina Santillan	Soap Opera
2007	Alguien Te Mira	Tatiana Wood	Soap Opera
2007	Amor por Accidente	Adriana Cicarelli	Soap Opera
2009	Los Exitosos Pells	Sol Costa	Soap Opera
2009	Conde Vrolok	Montserrat Batista	Soap Opera
2010	La Familia de al lado	Ignacia Fabres	Soap Opera
2012	Reserva de Familia	Lucía Rivera	Soap Opera
2013	Separados	Carolina Cavada	Soap Opera
2014	El Amor Lo Manejo Yo	Laura Green	Soap Opera
2014	No abras la puerta	Isabel Tobar	Soap Opera

== Theater ==
- H (Hiroshima Mon Amour)
- Los Borrachos
- De Ratones y de Hombres
- La Caida de la Casa Usher
- Top Dogs
- Tres Noches de un Sábado
