= Pablo Illanes =

Chilean writer, screenwriter, journalist and film director

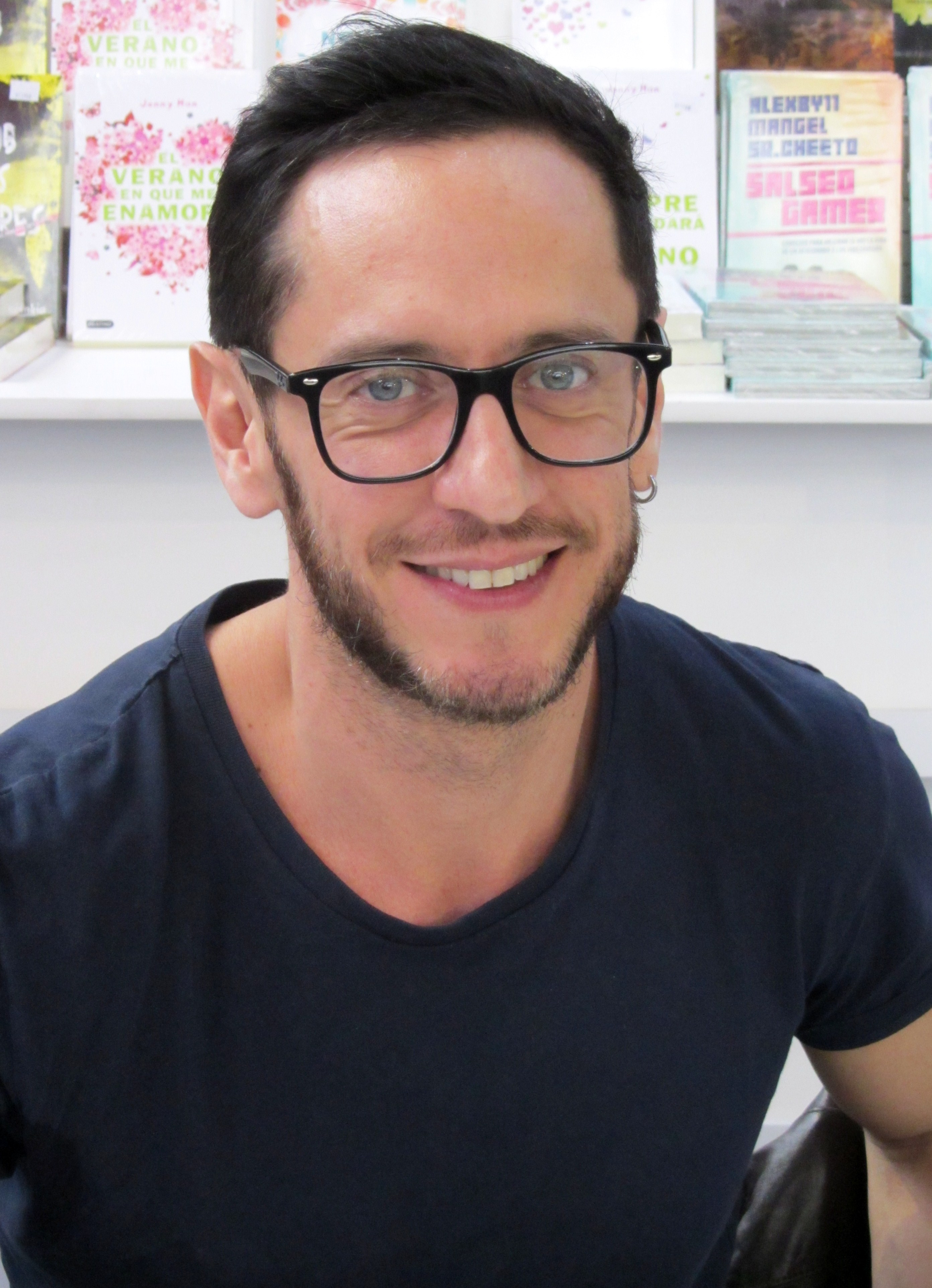
- Illanes in 2015
- Born: Pablo Andrés Illanes Tapia; 12 March 1973 (age 53); Santiago, Chile
- Education: Diego Portales University
- Occupations: Author; screenwriter; journalist; filmmaker
- Spouse: Mauricio López (m. 2018)
- Writing career
- Notable works: Machos; Alguien te mira ¿Dónde está Elisa?

Pablo Andrés Illanes Tapia (born March 12, 1973) is a Chilean writer, screenwriter, journalist and film director, principally known as the creator of various successful telenovelas, including Adrenalina, Machos, Alguien te mira, ¿Dónde está Elisa? and Conde Vrolok.

== Biography ==
Illanes studied journalism at Diego Portales University. After establishing himself as a film critic in Wikén, the weekend supplement of the newspaper El Mercurio, and at the defunct TV station Canal 2 Rock & Pop, he wrote his first telenovela, Adrenalina (1996). It was aired on Canal 13. The telenovela generated controversy for its storyline based on fleeting teen romances at a high school in the "barrio alto" (upper district) of Santiago.

His second telenovela, Playa salvaje (1997), was the most watched telenovela of the decade on its channel. His initiation as a screenwriter came later, with Fuera de control (1999), which did not generate high television ratings but was lauded by critics; it became a cult classic, and would be reaired on two occasions.

After Piel canela (2001), a series which obtained weak ratings and critical reviews and caused a temporary pause of telenovela production on Canal 13, he reestablished himself with the successful Machos (2003), co-written with Coca Gómez and Sebastián Arrau. The telenovela had a broad social impact and generated substantial ratings, and won several awards including two Altazors. It was extremely successful and would eventually be rebroadcast in Spain and various Latin American countries including Uruguay, where it was greatly popular.

Illanes then worked at Televisión Nacional de Chile (TVN) where he wrote the soap operas Destinos cruzados (2004) and Versus (2005). He also adapted the script of the Argentinean soap opera Floricienta, whose Chilean version, Floribella, premiered in 2006. Illanes created the first Chilean suspense TV series, Alguien te mira, based on the activities of a psychopath in the affluent section of Santiago, gaining the largest ever audience for a nighttime television series. This success allowed him to work on a new project, ¿Dónde está Elisa? a crime/suspense series inspired by real cases such as those of Madeleine McCann and Jorge Matute Johns. After that series, he wrote Conde Vrolok, a vampire telenovela set in the 19th century and inspired by Dracula. He is also the author of the scripts for Témpano (2011).

He entered the field of literature with Una Mujer Brutal and fragilidad. As of 2013, Illanes is working on a third novel, Los Amantes Caníbales, named after his blog.

Illanes directed Baby Shower (2011), a horror film starring actresses such as Ingrid Isensee, Claudia Burr, Francisca Merina, Sofía García, and Patricia López from several of his previous series. He filmed his second feature-length film, Videoclub, in late 2012. It stars Pedro Campos, Luciana Echeverría, and Ingrid Cruz, and its soundtrack was produced by the band Pánico.

Illanes became a screenwriter with Telemundo in 2013, and is contracted to the company for three years. More recently, he signed a deal with Viacom International Studios.

== Personal life ==
As of 2018, Illanes is married to director Mauricio López. Their announcement received praise from Chilean LGBT rights-focused organization MOVILH.

== Filmography ==
=== Film ===
- Baby Shower (2011)
- Video cub (2013)
- No tengas miedo (2014)
- Sala de ensayo (2015)

=== Television ===
- Adrenalina (Canal 13, 1996)
- Playa salvaje (Canal 13, 1997)
- Fuera de control (Canal 13, 1999)
- Piel canela (Canal 13, 2001)
- Machos (Canal 13, 2003)
- Destinos cruzados (TVN, 2004)
- Versus (TVN, 2005)
- Floribella, adaptación (TVN, 2006)
- Alguien te mira (TVN, 2007)
- ¿Dónde está Elisa? (TVN, 2009)
- Conde Vrolok (TVN, 2009-2010)
- Témpano (TVN, 2011)
- Prófugos, (HBO, 2011)
- Reserva de familia, adaptación (TVN, 2012)

== Publications ==
- Una mujer brutal, novel, Alfaguara, 2000
- Te vas a morir de pena cuando yo no esté, a play premiered under the direction of Ricardo Balil, January 23, 2012 in the Festival Internacional Santiago a Mil
- mp3, stories; publisher, Editorial Andrés Bello, 2003
- fragilidad, novel, Alfaguara, 2004
- Los amantes caníbales, novel, Planeta, 2015
