= Marcelo Leonart =

Chilean writer, filmmaker, and theater director

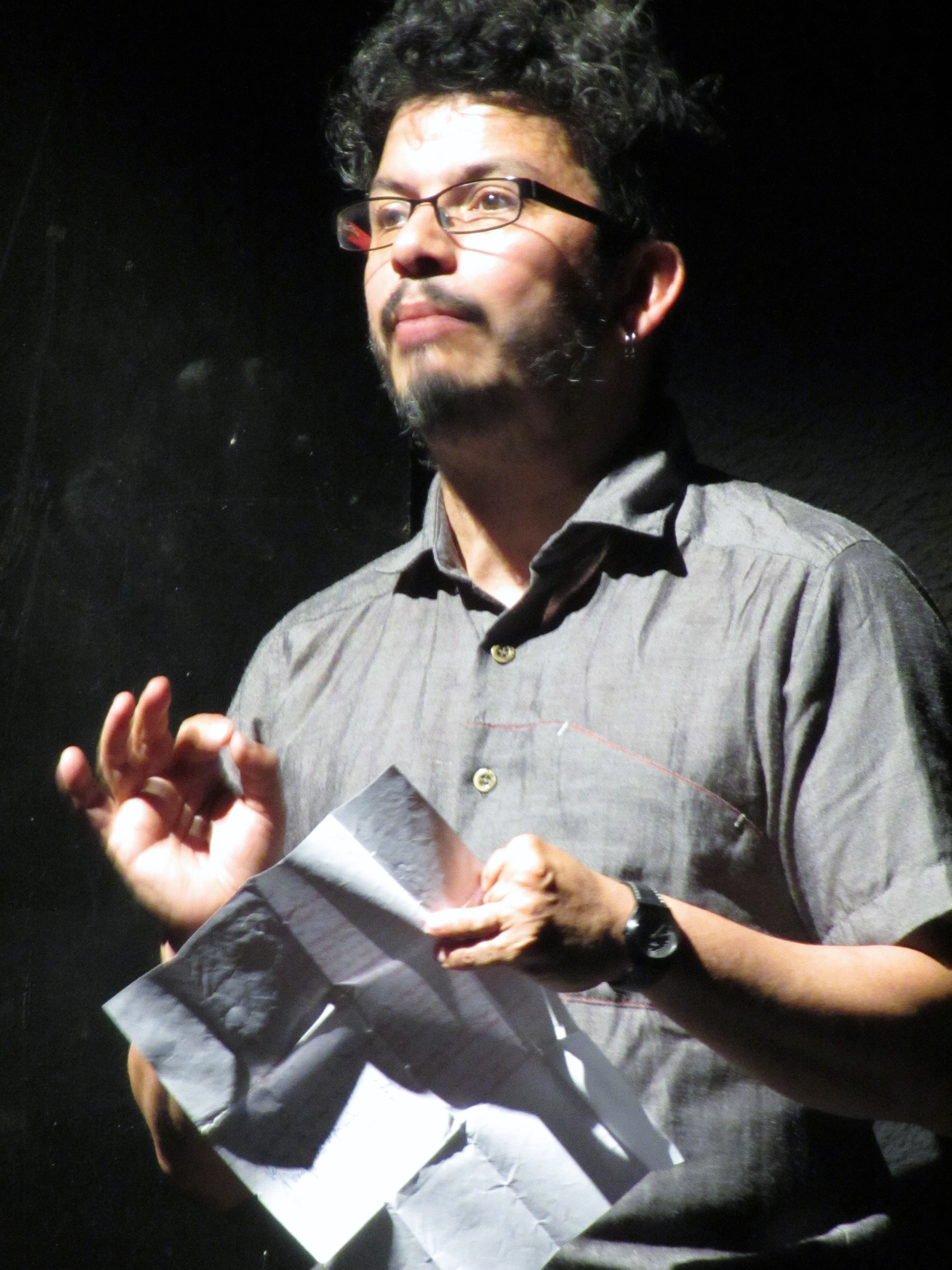
- Leonart before a Liceo de niñas performance, December 2015
- Born: Marcelo Enrique Leonart Tomas; 1970 (age 55–56); Santiago, Chile
- Occupations: Writer, filmmaker, theater director
- Spouse: Nona Fernández
- Awards: Altazor Award (2006); Revista de Libros Award (2011)

Marcelo Enrique Leonart Tomas (born 1970) is a Chilean writer, filmmaker, and theater director.

== Biography ==
An avid reader in childhood, Marcelo Leonart wrote his first play, No salgas esta noche, in 1991. He developed his skills by attending the literary workshops of Poli Délano, Antonio Skármeta, and Carlos Franz. It was in the last of these where he finished Mujer desnuda fumando en la ventana, his first book, which was published in 1999.

Some of the stories of that collection had already received awards, and the 2008 film 199 recetas para ser feliz, by Andrés Waissbluth, is based on one of them.

The following year, he was part of the scriptwriting team of the television series Romané. He went on to write for several other series. In 2012 he moved from TVN to Canal 13.

As a dramatist, Leonart has written a series of pieces, and among the most recent he has directed is El taller. Written by Nona Fernández and premiered in 2012, it is inspired by the literary workshop that Mariana Callejas had at her home in Lo Curro, while her husband Michael Townley directed the operations of a DINA barracks in the basement.

His first novel, Fotos de Laura, was applauded by critics and awarded, as was his second compilation of stories, La educación. After these two books appeared in 2012, he published the novels Lacra, La patria – whose main character is Francisco Javier Cuadra, minister of Augusto Pinochet – and Pascua, "which has at its center the abuses committed by priests."

As a filmmaker, Leonart co-directed, together with Paulo Avilés, the film Grita (based on his homonymous theatrical work), which premiered in 2009 at the Santiago International Film Festival.

He has a son, Dante, with his partner, the writer Nona Fernández, whom he met when they both studied at the Theater School of the Catholic University. In 2004 the couple founded the theater company La Fusa, with which Leonart staged all his works from Grita to Liceo de niñas. The latter premiered in 2015, and with it the company was renamed La Pieza Oscura.

== Awards ==
- Óscar Castro Award
- First place at the Gabriela Mistral Literary Games
- 1998 Juan Rulfo de Cuento Award (Radio France International, Paris) for Maribel bajo el brazo
- 2006 Altazor Award in the TV Script category for Los treinta (ex aequo)
- 2011 National Book and Reading Council Award in the Best Unpublished Work category for La educación
- 2011 Revista de Libros Award (El Mercurio) for Fotos de Laura
- 2012 National Book Council Award in the Best Unpublished Work category for the novel Lacra
- 2017 National Book Council Award in the Best Unpublished Work category for the novel Weichafe

== Works ==
=== Narrative ===
- Mujer desnuda fumando en la ventana, stories, Colección del Sur, Planeta, 1999 (Booket, 2004); containing five texts:
  - "Noticias de Milo", "Última llamada", "Maribel bajo el brazo", "Noches con Antonia", and "Mujer desnuda fumando en la ventana"
- Fotos de Laura, novel, El Mercurio/Aguilar, Santiago, 2012
- La educación, stories, Tajamar, Santiago, 2012; containing six stories:
  - "Crías", "Los perros", "Pájaros negro olfateando la carroña", "Caparazón", "Los cuerpos", and "La educación"
- La patria, novel with the principal character Francisco Javier Cuadra; Tajamar, Santiago, 2012
- Lacra, novel, Tajamar, Santiago, 2013
- Pascua, novel, Tajamar, Santiago, 2015
- El libro rojo de la historia de Chile, novel, Tajamar, Santiago, 2016

=== Theater ===
- No salgas esta noche, 1991
- Sobre los mismos techos, 1992
- SubCielo, fuego en la ciudad, 1994
- Pompa Bye-Bye, 1995
- Encadenados, 1997
- Grita, 2004; published in the book Bestiario, freakshow temporada 1973/1990, together with Medusa (2010, by Ximena Carrera) and El taller (2012, by Nona Fernández); Ceibo Ediciones, Santiago, 2013
- Lo invisible, 2006
- Cuerpos mutilados en el campo de batalla, 2007
- Todas las fiestas del mañana, 2008
- Noche mapuche, directed by the author; La Pieza Oscura company, GAM, 30 September – 28 October 2017

=== Telenovelas ===
==== Original stories ====
- 16 (2003)
- 17 (2005)
- Los treinta (2005)
- Disparejas (2006)
- Amor por accidente (2007)
- 40 y Tantos (2010)

==== Adaptations ====
- Romané (2000) – original by Sergio Bravo
- Amores de mercado (2001) – original by Fernando Aragón and Arnaldo Madrid
- Purasangre (2002) – original by Alejandro Cabrera and Larissa Contreras
- Aída (2008) – original by Nacho G. Velilla
- Los exitosos Pells (2009) – Original by Esther Feldman and Alejandro Maci
- Secretos en el jardín (2013) – original by Julio Rojas and Matías Ovalle

==== New versions rewritten by others ====
- Dulce amargo (2013) (Los treinta) - by Iris Dubs
