= Alguien te mira (Chilean TV series) =

- Written by: Pablo Illanes; Nona Fernández
- Directed by: María Eugenia Rencoret
- Starring: Francisco Melo; Francisco Pérez-Bannen; Álvaro Rudolphy; Sigrid Alegría; Francisca Imboden; Paola Volpato; Alejandra Fosalba; Celine Reymond
- Opening theme: "When I See You Smile" (Bad English)
- Country of origin: Chile
- Original language: Spanish
- No. of episodes: 78

Production
- Producer: Daniela Demicheli

Original release
- Network: TVN
- Release: April 30 – August 16, 2007

Alguien te mira (literally Someone’s watching you) is a telenovela from Televisión Nacional de Chile. Directed by María Eugenia Rencoret, produced by Daniela Demichelli and written by Pablo Illanes and Nona Fernández. The telenovela marked a change in themes from earlier night time productions from the state channel, being that this time the main themes were not troubled couple relationships and sex, but this time the main theme was associated with a serial killer, who kills women by taking their hearts. The debut date was April 30, 2007, and the last episode took place on August 16 of the same year.

== History ==
Santiago, 1992

Rodrigo Quintana, Piedad Estévez, Julián García and Benjamín Morandé are inseparable friends. Idealistic in their planning of future projects, they study medicine and dream of working together to help the needy.

Rodrigo (Francisco Melo) is the most charming and intelligent, and is the natural leader of the group. His personality wins over Piedad (Sigrid Alegría) with whom he shares an intense but tumultuous love, while Julián (Álvaro Rudolphy) loves Piedad in silence. Rodrigo's drug and alcohol addiction result in the deterioration of his relationship with Piedad. He reaches a point where he disappears from his friends' lives, after a confusing incident that results in a dead body and in Piedad being hospitalized.

Rodrigo Quintana leaves his friends and his studies to admit himself into a rehabilitation center outside of Chile. Piedad is never the same again.

Santiago, 2007

Now, 15 years later, when Benjamín, Julián, and Piedad have forgotten about the past, Rodrigo returns to their lives. Partners in an ophthalmology practice, the three doctors find that Rodrigo Quintana's return from Europe continues to bother them. The friends have changed. Quintana opts for an austere lifestyle in a rural clinic, while his friends accumulate a small fortune operating on the eyes of high-society people.

Rodrigo's return breaks Piedad's daily routine, who discovers that in spite of everything, Rodrigo is still the love of her life.

Meanwhile, Julián—divorced for a year from Matilde (Alejandra Fosalba)—becomes preoccupied with Piedad. It bothers Julián that history could repeat itself, and that Rodrigo could finally succeed in taking away the woman Julián's always loved but has never been able to have.

But love is not the only thing that changes the lives of this group of friends. While they are all at a benefit event, they are witnesses to a crime. The victim, María Gracia Carpenter (Amparo Noguera), a well-known socialite, is the third murder that torments the city.

Before her, the mysterious disappearance of Angela Argento (María José León), a sophisticated executive, was very closely followed by the media and the police. They concluded that they were in the presence of a psychopath serial killer, whose victims were beautiful, independent, high-society women. All were killed using the same M.O., a deep and accurate cut to remove their hearts.

The lead police detective Eva Zanetti (Paola Volpato) is in charge of the investigation. Everyone is a suspect. Slowly the circle of suspects is tightened, and the suspects are reined in. Only one is the killer, and with the passing of time the hour of the discovery of the killer's true identity draws closer.

== Cast ==
- Álvaro Rudolphy - Julián García
- Sigrid Alegría - Piedad Estévez
- Francisco Melo - Rodrigo Quintana
- Francisco Perez-Bannen - Benjamín Morandé
- Alejandra Fosalba - Matilde Larraín
- Luz Valdivieso - Tatiana Wood
- Claudio Arredondo - Pedro Pablo Peñafiel
- Francisca Imboden - Josefina "Pepi" Morandé
- Paola Volpato - Eva Zanetti
- Andrés Velasco - Mauricio Ossa
- Celine Reymond - Camila Wood
- Romina Mena - Lucy Saldaña
- Javiera Toledo - Isidora Morandé
- Adela Calderón - Yoyita
- Pablo Striano - Detective Carvajal

== Music Bands ==
1. Juego de seducción (Soda Stereo)
2. Atado a un sentimiento (Miguel Mateos)
3. Por el resto (Los Enanitos Verdes)
4. Tom y Jerry (Cinema)
5. Los dinosaurios (Charly García)
6. Pronta entrega (Virus)
7. Mi vida vale más (Valija Diplomática)
8. Desnudita es mejor (Divina Gloria)
9. Aire de todos (GIT)
10. Cleopatra, reina del twist (Fabiana Cantilo)
11. Canción animal (Gustavo Cerati)
12. Tus viejas cartas (Los Enanitos Verdes)
13. Sigues dando vueltas (La Rue Morgue)
14. Whisky a go-go (Roupa Nova)
15. Puedo sentirlo (David Lebon)
16. La rubia tarada (Sumo)
17. Debajo del puente (Ariel Rot)
18. When I see you smile (Bad English, (song used by "the hunter" to murder his victims)
