= 40 y Tantos =

- Genre: Telenovela
- Written by: Marcelo Leonart; Ximena Carrera; Andrea Franco; Carla Stagno; José Fonseca
- Directed by: María Eugenia Rencoret; Ítalo Galleani
- Starring: Francisco Melo; Paola Volpato; Francisca Imboden; Francisco Pérez-Bannen
- Opening theme: "I Want to Break Free" (Queen)
- Country of origin: Chile
- Original language: Spanish
- No. of episodes: 134

Original release
- Network: TVN
- Release: July 12, 2010 – October 3, 2011

40 y Tantos (International Title: 40 Something) is a Chilean telenovela produced by TVN and directed by María Eugenia Rencoret and Ítalo Galleani. The series was written by Marcelo Leonart, Ximena Carrera, Andrea Franco, Carla Stagno and José Fonseca.

== Plot ==
Diego (Francisco Melo), Rosario (Francisca Imboden), Marco (Francisco Pérez-Bannen) and Miguel Elizalde (Matías Oviedo) are four siblings who live the crisis forty and have just lost their father. Diego, who is the oldest, is in charge of his father's company, Elizalde Communications, where he works with his two brothers, Rosario and Marco, and his assistant and lover, Susana Jerez (Mónica Godoy). After Loreto Estevez (Paola Volpato), his wife, caught him in the act of infidelity with his lover, he tries to win her love over again but Loreto asks for a divorce.

Rosario is a working single mother who has to deal with Diego as the chief of the family business and has to raise his son Cristóbal (Nicolás Brown), who is addicted to drugs and has connections with Joaquin Sarda (Andrés Velasco), his best friend and partner in the firm, who is going to marry Renata Santelices (Katyna Huberman).

Marco is a married gamer, who supports his family, and is immature as well as the only witness to the relationship between his niece, the daughter of Diego and Loreto, Fernanda Elizalde (Juanita Ringeling) and a professor of the university, Gaspar Mellado (Bastián Bodenhöfer), who is 30 years her senior.

Finally Miguel, the youngest brother, returns from abroad and learns of the death of his father. Miguel is supported by his brothers because he does not work and has to deal with the demons of a relationship he had with the wife of Marco, Tatiana (Claudia Burr), before he went abroad and which had a daughter, Camila (Javiera Osorio), which is supposed to be his brother.

== Cast ==
- Francisco Melo as Diego Elizalde
- Paola Volpato as Loreto Estévez
- Francisca Imboden as Rosario Elizalde
- Francisco Pérez-Bannen as Marco Elizalde
- Matías Oviedo as Miguel Elizalde
- Claudia Burr as Tatiana Arizmendi
- Nicolás Brown as Cristóbal Cuesta
- Mónica Godoy as Susana Jerez
- Andrés Velasco as Joaquín Sardá
- Katyna Huberman as Renata Santelices
- César Caillet as Génaro Monckeberg
- Juanita Ringeling as Fernanda Elizalde
- Bastián Bodenhöfer as Gaspar Mellado
- Javiera Osorio as Camila Elizalde
- Jorge Velasco as Damián Elizalde
