= Hugo Medina =

Chilean actor

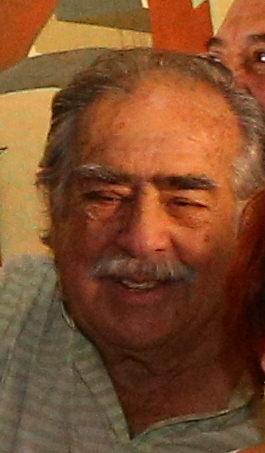
- Medina in 2020
- Born: Hugo Daniel Medina Medina; October 18, 1943 (age 82); Santiago de Chile
- Education: University of Chile
- Occupation: Actor

Hugo Daniel Medina Medina (Santiago, October 18, 1943) is a Chilean actor and theater director.

== Biography ==
Trained at the University of Chile's School of Theatre and the River Side Institute in London, he acknowledges the influence of Pedro Orthous and Agustín Siré, both key figures in shaping the university theatre scene in Chile, and of Nobel laureate Dario Fo. His work on stage, since 1964, has developed along three lines: the universal classical repertoire, primarily with university companies; Chilean classical plays; and, finally, a militant theatre, with an avant-garde aesthetic and strong political content, developed during the Popular Unity government (1970–1973) in Chile and later in exile in England, Sweden, and Germany, among other European countries.

Medina has said that for him, acting "is more than work; it's the pleasure of having this vital expression of creating, inventing characters, and putting them at the service of a whole, with its social, psychological, and aesthetic mechanisms, but above all, essential for the creators involved."

He highlights his participation in the productions: A Midsummer Night's Dream with the University of Chile Theater (1965), Viet Rock (1969), Chile 11.9.73, and The End of the World Called Us, presented for two years (1975–1977) in various European theaters. First in Sweden with the Sandino Company (1982) and later at the Catholic University of Chile, Lomas del Paraíso (1997), El Vestidor (1998), La Viuda de Apablaza (1999), Rompiendo Códigos (2000), Le Bourgeois gentilhomme (2001), and other works such as "Hechos Consumados" (1988), Accidental Death of an Anarchist (1986), and Ariel Dorfman's well-known play Death and the Maiden (1991), with the Teatro Imagen, Luciérnaga, and Chilean National Theater companies.

From 1972 to the present, Medina has maintained a significant and continuous body of work in film. Between 1972 and 1987, he acted in several politically charged films, first in Chile and then in Bulgaria, Sweden, and Germany, during the years he spent in exile following the coup d'état of September 1973. Among his notable works are Metamorphosis of the Chief of the Political Police (1972), The Promised Land (1973), and Disappeared Prisoners (1979). With the restoration of democracy in Chile, Medina participated in several films, including Sussi (1987), Johnny 100 Pesos (1993), and Historias de Fútbol (1997). This period is characterized by his involvement in productions with less overtly political content, more commercially oriented, and extensive work in television (telenovelas, educational programs, and miniseries). Since 1988, he has taught acting and basic emotional processes, both in Chile and Europe. In the last decade he has worked on award-winning films such as Jailbreak Pact (2020), Chile '76 (2022), and Prison in the Andes (2023), continuing the theme related to dictatorship and human rights violations.

In 2007 and 2011, he won the Altazor Award for Best Theater Actor. In 2018, he received a tribute from the Chilean Actors' Union for his career achievements. In 2024 he received the Caleuche Award as best male actor film performance for Prison in the Andes where he characterized Manuel Contreras.

=== Kidnapping and Exile ===
On November 20, 1973, Medina was kidnapped, detained, and tortured at the Buin Infantry Regiment No. 1 in Recoleta. He was subsequently sent to the Santiago Public Prison. After a military trial and an eight-month civilian trial, insufficient evidence was found to convict him, and he was released on November 22, 1975. Medina was forced into exile in England, with a 10-year ban on returning to Chile. In London, he reunited with Coca Rudolphy and Marcelo Romo, who were in exile after suffering the same fate as Medina. He returned to Chile in 1985.

On December 14, 2022, the Santiago Court of Appeals ordered the Chilean government to pay Medina 120 million pesos in damages for emotional distress due to the torture and coercion he suffered during Augusto Pinochet's civic-military dictatorship. It was established that Medina was a victim of illegal detention, imprisonment, and torture between November 20, 1973, and November 22, 1975, with the resulting serious physical and psychological consequences.

== Filmography ==
=== Films ===
Year	Títle	Character	Director
1973	Metamorfosis del jefe de la policía política		Helvio Soto
1973	La tierra prometida	Campesino	Miguel Littín
1977	Queridos compañeros		Pablo de la Barra
1978	El paso		Orlando Lübbert
1979	Prisioneros desaparecidos		Sergio M. Castilla
1979	De försvunna		Sergio M. Castilla
1986	Nemesio		Cristián Lorca
1987	Sussi		Gonzalo Justiniano
1987	La estación del regreso	Camionero	Leo Kocking
1993	Johnny cien pesos	Professor	Gustavo Graef Marino
1997	Historias de fútbol	Don Mario	Andrés Wood
1999	The Sentimental Teaser	Loro	Cristián Galaz
1999	El desquite		Andrés Wood
2000	Coronation	Locutor de radio	Silvio Caiozzi
2001	Un ladrón y su mujer		Rodrigo Sepúlveda
2003	Estación de invierno		Pamela Espinoza
2004	El tesoro de los caracoles	Don Julio	Cristián Jiménez
2005	Alberto: ¿Quién sabe cuánto cuesta hacer un ojal?		Ricardo Larraín
2008	The Sky, the Earth and the Rain		José Luis Torres
2008	The Good Life	Pepe	Andrés Wood
2009	Optical Illusions	Don Justo	Cristián Jiménez
2011	Bonsái	Gazmuri	Cristián Jiménez
2011	03:34: Earthquake in Chile	Don Cucho	Juan Pablo Ternicier
2014	Hijo de Trauco	Rafael	Alan Fischer
2020	Jailbreak Pact	Padre Gerard Fôvet	David Albala
2022	1976	Padre Sánchez	Manuela Martelli
2023	Prison in the Andes	Manuel Contreras	Felipe Carmona

=== Television ===
Telenovelas
Year			Channel
Year	Title	Role	Channel
1985	Matrimonio de papel	Gabriel Román	Canal 13
1985	Marta a las ocho	Antonio Gutiérrez	TVN
1985	Morir de amor	Manuel Tapia	TVN
1991	Volver an empezar	Salustio Moure	TVN
1993	Doble juego	Ángel	Canal 13
1994	Rompecorazón	Ignacio Riesco	TVN
1997	Oro verde	Casimiro Moraga	TVN
1998	Iorana	Hotu Pakarati	TVN
2003	16	Ambrosio Vargas	TVN
2004	Destinos Cruzados	Ruperto Menchaca	TVN
2004	17	Ambrosio Vargas	TVN
2015	La Poseída	José María Leal	TVN
2019	Río Oscuro	Eusebio Llanos	Canal 13
2023	Juego de ilusiones	Nadir Nazir	Mega

Series
Year	Title	Role
1972	La sal del desierto	
1987	La Quintrala	Alonso Solórzano y Velasco
1992	Los Venegas	Torrejón
1992	Estrictamente sentimental	Onofre Salcedo
1997	Brigada Escorpión	Horacio Luna
1998	Las historias de Sussi	Ricardo Santa María
1998	Los Cárcamo	Tito
2000	Gracias por la vida	Juan Manríquez
2001	A la suerte de la olla	Gilberto Moraga
2004	El cuento del tío	Evaristo
2004	Loco por ti	Alberto
2005	Mea culpa	Porfirio Pino
2005	Tiempo final: en tiempo real	Comisario
2005	Heredia y asociados	Julio
2007; 2024	El día menos pensado	Padre Valentín / Padre Ramiro
2007	Litoral	Carlos Rey
2008	Huaiquimán y Tolosa	Juan
2008	Ana y los siete	Nicolás Correa
2010	Adiós al séptimo de línea	Santiago Amengual
2010	Volver a mí	Mauricio Toledo
2016	Bala Loca	Julio Osorio
2017	Irreversible	Víctor Valderrama
2018	Mary & Mike	Carlos Prats
2022	Celeste	Héctor Correa
