= Luis Dubó =

Chilean actor

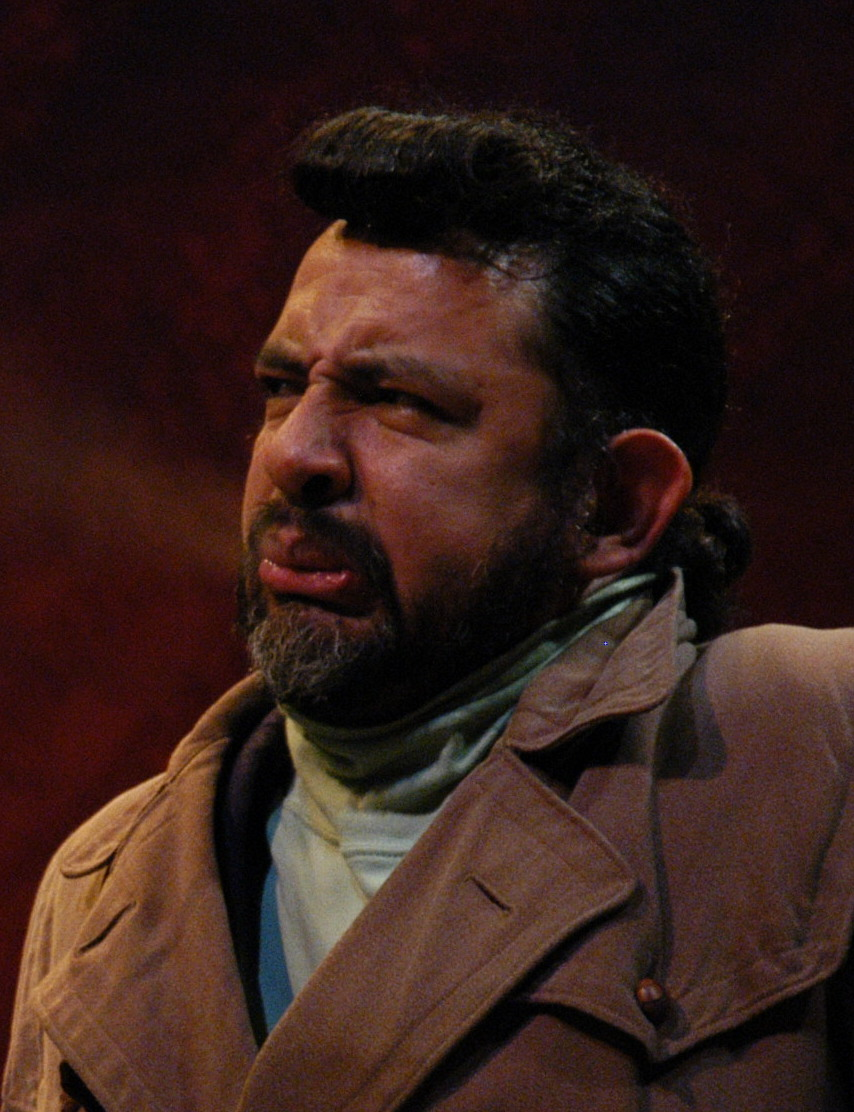
- Dubó performing in Teatro UC in 2006
- Born: Luis Humberto Dubó Alfaro; January 16, 1964 (age 62); Chuquicamata, Antofagasta Region
- Occupation: Actor

Luis Humberto Dubó Alfaro (Chuquicamata, January 21, 1964) is a Chilean actor with a long standing career in theatre, television and films. He was born on January 16, 1964, in the miner town of Chuquicamata, and graduated from the DRAN Theater Acting program, directed by Jorge Loncón. He has participated in various plays alongside Luis Ureta, Compañía La Puerta, Horacio Videla, Compañía La Bendita Comparsa, Claudia Echeñique, Ramón Griffero, Compañía Fin de Siglo, Marcela Arroyave, Compañía Corre y Vuela, Arturo Rossel, Compañía Equilibrio Precario, and Roberto Ancavil. Some of the plays he has directed include A Midsummer Night's Dream (by W. Shakespeare), Decir sí (by Griselda Gambaro), and Flores amarillas.

His film career began in 1998 with an acting role in the film Coronation, directed by Silvio Caiozzi. Since then he has participated in several films production with some of the most awarded Chilean directors such as Silvio Caiozzi, Andrés Wood, Miguel Littin, Pablo Larraín, Sebastián Silva, Gonzalo Justiniano, and Sebastián Lelio. His television debut was in 1995 in the episode "El Toro de Quilamuta" of the TVN series Mea Culpa.

== Filmography ==
=== Films ===
Year	Title	Role	Director	Award
2000	Coronation	René	Silvio Caiozzi	
2001	La fiebre del loco	Jorge	Andrés Wood	Nominado – Altazor
2001	Negocio redondo	El chico Mario	Ricardo Carrasco	Nominado – Altazor
2002	El abanderado	Abanderado	Miguel Littin	
2002	Te llamabas Roscier	Aníbal Maturana	Arnaldo Valsecchi	
2002	Estación de invierno		Pamela Espinoza	
2002	Paraíso B	Esteban	Nicolás Acuña	
2003	Unemployed	Predicador	Ricardo Amunátegui	
2004	Machuca	Ismael Machuca	Andrés Wood	
2004	Mala leche	Marmota	León Errázuriz	
2004	Azul y blanco	Ona	Sebastián Araya	
2004	El último disparo del Negro Chávez		Juan Carlos Bustamante	
2005	Límite	Pancho	Nicolás Jullian	
2006	Fuga	Dubó	Pablo Larraín	
2006	Adán y Eva		Gregory Cohen	
2007	Aguas milagrosas	Camilo	Mauricio Muñoz	
2008	Mansacue	Juan Brito	Marco Enríquez-Ominami	
2009	The Maid	Eric	Sebastián Silva	
2009	Dawson Isla 10	Sargento Figueroa	Miguel Littin	Ganador Altazor
2009	Desorejado	Michimalonco	Sebastián Alarcón	
2009	El baile de la Victoria	Rigoberto Marín	Fernando Trueba	
2009	The Goatherd	The Goatherd	León Errázuriz	
2011	My Last Round	Emiliano	Julio Jorquera	
2012	The Year of the Tiger	Manuel	Sebastián Lelio	Ganador Festival Internacional UNASUR
2012	Salt	Pascual	Diego Rougier	
2013	Magic, Magic	Bernardo	Sebastián Silva	
2013	La pasión de Michelangelo	Facundo	Esteban Larraín	
2013	Barrio universitario	Profesor Guajardo	Esteban Vidal	
2013	Il mondo fino in fondo	Borracho	Alessandro Lunardelli	
2014	Huesos rotos	Manuel González	Ricardo Mahnke	
2014	Hijo de trauco	Alejo	Alan Fischer	
2014	Neruda		Manuel Basoalto	
2015	Tailón		Martín Tuta	
2015	Pelokëlan	Óscar Leiva		
2015	Alma	Nino	Diego Rougier	
2016	Neruda	Comunista	Pablo Larraín	
2016	Argentino ql	Taxista	Pato Pimienta	
2016	Y todo el cielo cupo en el ojo de la vaca muerta		Francisca Alegría	
2017	Cabros de mierda	Tito	Gonzalo Justiniano	
2017	Los versos del olvido	Peluquero	Alireza Khatami	
2019	La vida simplemente		Guillermo Salinas	
2020	Jailbreak Pact	Hugo Salgado	David Abdala	
2020	Dominio vigente	Taxista	Juan Mora	
2021	A Place Called Dignity	Pastor	Matías Rojas	
2022	The Cow Who Sang a Song Into the Future	Víctor	Francisca Alegría	
2023	Desconectados	Cliente	Diego Rougier	
2023	The Movie Teller		Lone Scherfig	
2025	Los renacidos	Roque	Santiago Esteves	
2025	The Mysterious Gaze of the Flamingo	Clemente	Diego Céspedes	

=== Television ===
==== Telenovelas ====
Teleseries
Year	Teleserie	Role	Channel
1997	Playa salvaje	Erik	Canal 13
1999	Fuera de control	Toribio	Canal 13
2002	Buen partido	Wilson	Canal 13
2003	Puertas adentro	Narciso Romero	TVN
2004	Hippie	Juan Jara	Canal 13
2004	Xfea2	El Ramazzotti	Mega
2005	Es cool	Padre Ignacio Ovalle	Mega
2005	Mitú	Mariano Román	Mega
2006	Porky te amo	Luchito Mario	Mega
2007	Relatos de niños	Payaso	CHV
2012	Maldita	Antonio "Tonino" Díaz	Mega

==== TV Series ====
Year	Serie	Character	Notes
1993	La patrulla del desierto	Prisionero	Episodio: Los peligros de Dolores
1995-2006	Mea Culpa	varios	4 episodios
2002-2004	La vida es una lotería	varios	3 episodios
2002	El Día Menos Pensado	Ramón Luna	Episodio: El tesoro
2004	Justicia para todos	Aylwin Chamorro	Episodio: La ley de la cárcel
2005	El cuento del tío	varios	2 episodios
2005	Heredia & Asociados	Gastón	Episodio: Morir en Cartagena
2005	Los simuladores	Asaltante	Episodio: Asalto express
2005	Los Galindo	Miguel Galindo	Protagonista
2006	Tiempo final	Cantinero	Episodio: Cruce de rutas
2006	La otra cara del espejo	Alberto	Episodio: La trampa
2006-2023	Casado con hijos	Fito	3 episodios
2007	Héroes	Orozimbo Barbosa	Episodio: Balmaceda
2009	Mi bella genio	Filiberto	Episodio: Made in Chimbarongo
2009	Mundos paralelos	¿?
2010	Volver a mí	Raúl	10 episodios
2010	Cartas de mujer		Episodio: Carta de Leontina
2011	Prófugos	Cacho Aguilera	Reparto
2011-2017	12 días que estremecieron a Chile	varios	2 episodios
2012	Infieles	Humberto	Episodio: El refuerzo
2013	Ecos del desierto	Marcelo Moren Brito	Reparto
2015	Sitiados	Cañupán	Reparto
2016	Ramona	Víctor Lizana	Reparto
2016	Vidas en riesgo
2017	Lo que callamos las mujeres	Antonio/Raúl	2 episodios
2017	Una historia necesaria	Julio Vega
2019	La vida simplemente	Borrado Orellana	Reparto
2023	El refugio	Eduardo Varas	Reparto
