= Bala Loca =

Chilean television series

- Genre: Serial drama
- Created by: Marcos de Aguirre; David Miranda Hardy
- Written by: Gonzalo Maza; Pablo Toro; David Miranda Hardy
- Directed by: Gabriel Díaz; Óscar Godoy
- Country of origin: Chile
- Original language: Spanish
- No. of seasons: 1
- No. of episodes: 10

Production
- Executive producers: Marcos de Aguirre; David Miranda; Rodrigo Díaz
- Production locations: Santiago, Chile
- Running time: 45 minutes
- Production company: Filmosonido Producciones

Original release
- Network: Chilevisión
- Release: July 4 – September 4, 2016

Bala Loca (originally Entero Quebrado) is a Chilean television series created by Marcos de Aguirre and David Miranda Hardy and produced by Filmosonido for Chilevisión. Bala loca means "stray bullet".

The series revolves around an investigation by a disabled journalist, Mauro Murillo (Alejandro Goic), and features a cast with both established actors including Alfredo Castro, Aline Kuppenheim, Julio Milostich, Catalina Saavedra, Pablo Schwarz, Ingrid Isensee, as well as younger actors such as Fernanda Urrejola, Mario Horton and Lucas Bolvarán.

The production was the recipient of the annual grant from Chile's National Television Council in 2014. It premiered on television on July 4, 2016. The first season ended on September 4, 2016, with a double episode.

== Plot ==
The main protagonist is Mauro Murillo (Alejandro Goic). After fighting the military dictatorship of Augusto Pinochet, he became a celebrity journalist, a fact which some of his colleagues still do not forgive. At the peak of his career, he suffered a car accident that left him in a wheelchair. The rejection of his latest project by a television executive is causing him to reflect on his career. In addition to his career problems, Mauro also deals with his separation from Ángela (Aline Kuppenheim), a journalist who works at a newspaper; an abandoned teenage son, Daniel (Víctor Quezada), who begins to struggle with changes as a teenager; and a sexually dissatisfied girlfriend, Valeria Sánchez (Fernanda Urrejola), a younger woman who has a communications consulting company.

At fifty years old, the only possibility he sees of changing his situation is to invest the profits from his past ten years of stardom doing celebrity journalism, and to establish an online journalism site that fearlessly confronts the powerful of Chile. He clings to the possibility of working with Patricia Fuenzalida (Catalina Saavedra), a widely respected professional journalist who writes an independent blog, a platform she uses to unmask corrupt entrepreneurs. However, she rejects him again and again, disenchanted with his lack of professional ethics. In the midst of his desperate attempts to change her mind, she dies in a strange assault on a supermarket.

Mauro's instinct tells him that something else is hiding behind the supposed stray bullet (bala loca) that ended the journalist's life. Thus, he turns to Oscar (Mateo Iribarren), Patricia's husband, to help him discover what the journalist was investigating. Finally it is Víctor (Nicolás Durán), her son, who gives him the folders holding the murdered journalist's investigation. Thus, Eugenio 'Coco' Aldunate (Alfredo Castro), a powerful businessman who owns a health insurance company, becomes the main suspect. The magnate maintains political ties with Julián Torres Becker (Marcial Tagle), a liberal and progressive senator from the PPD who is a close friend of Murillo. Aldunate is also the main suspect of Nelson Iturra (Pablo Schwarz), a police investigator who takes the case of the reporter's death.

Mauro assembles a new team: Gabriela Vuskovic (Trinidad González), an experienced journalist and a demanding leader; Antonia Serrano (Ingrid Isensee), a journalist who worked at the newspaper with Murillo's ex-wife, but left her comfortable job to do more challenging journalism; Andrés Villanueva (Mario Horton), a journalist with technology skills, highly committed to justice and truth; and Alejandra Mujica (Manuela Oyarzún), a young professional with a reporter's nose, whose tenacity makes her a daring investigator. Mauro announces the premise on which their new EnGuardia.cl website is founded: Is it possible that in today's Chile a journalist is killed for investigating the powerful?

== Production ==
In 2014, the series produced by Filmosonido was awarded the grant of the National Television Council of Chile, worth CLP$437,914,700 (US$767,802 in 2014), for its production. Recording occurred from January 11 to April 23, 2016.

== Cast ==
=== Main ===
- Alejandro Goic as Mauro Murillo
- Trinidad González as Gabriela Vuskovic
- Ingrid Isensee as Antonia Serrano
- Mario Horton as Andrés Villanueva
- Manuela Oyarzún as Alejandra Mujica
- Fernanda Urrejola as Valeria Sánchez
- Catalina Saavedra as Patricia Fuenzalida
- Pablo Schwarz as Nelson Iturra
- Aline Kuppenheim as Ángela Schmidt
- Marcial Tagle as Julián Torres Becker
- Víctor Quezada as Daniel Murillo
- Alfredo Castro as Eugenio "Coco" Aldunate
- Roberto Farías as Alexis Vilches

=== Recurring ===
- Nicolás Durán as Víctor Paredes Fuenzalida
- Mateo Iribarren as Óscar Paredes
- Julio Milostich as General Larrondo
- Willy Semler as General Arismendi
- Hugo Medina as Julio Osorio
- Erto Pantoja as Oliverio Farías
- Iván Álvarez de Araya as Agustín
- María Paz Grandjean as Mariana Lobos
- Víctor Montero as Félix Morales
- Sebastián Ayala as Technician
- Luis Uribe as Rapist
- Daniel Candia as Mario Palazzo, Hitman
- Simón Pascal as Assailant
- Francisco Ossa as Daniel's School Inspector
- Gaspar Rosson as Felipe
- Benjamín Westfall as Supermarket Guard
- Mario Ossandón as Aldunate's Lawyer
- Lucas Bolvarán as Rodrigo
- Rodrigo Soto as Uncle Carlos
- Alex Draper as Peter
- Román Wilson as Dylan
- Thomas Bentin as Mikael Ivelic
- Christián Farías as Secuaz

=== Guests ===
- Pablo Cerda as Fabio
- Alejandro Sieveking as Pedro Cisneros
- Michael Silva as Joel Medina
- Boris Quercia as César Fantini
- Celine Reymond as Juliana
- Sergio Hernández as Mr. Murillo
- Eyal Meyer as Man X
- Pablo Striano as Pelao Fernández
- Ximena Rivas as Luisa Arismendi
- Andrea Martínez as Commentator
- Javiera Torres as Victoria "Vicky"
- Jack Arama as Doctor Materán
- Daniela Torres as Reporter
- Laura Olazábal as Shooting Club Secretary
- Rodrigo Lisboa as Forensic Technician
- Elvis Fuentes as Ramírez
- Silvana Hardy as Marta
- Vittorio Yaconi as Pablo Miller
- Andrés Rillón as YouTube Journalist
- Eugenio González as TV Politician
- Eduardo Squella as TV Politician
- Ignacio Santa Cruz as Ricardo Rojas
- Manuel Peña as Hugo Céspedes
- Eduardo de Aguirre as Juez Rómulo
- Carlos Isensee as Judge Radic
- Eugenio Ahumada as Judge
- Gabriela Calvete as Sound Technician
- Rafael de la Reguera as Cameraman
- Nikolás Bottinelli as Dealer
- Cristián Quezada as Tito Almeyda
- Iván Parra as Mateo
- Renato Illanes as Juan Molina
- Katy Cabezas as Lorena Pérez
- Carlos Donoso as Guard
- David Miranda as Prosecutor Awad
- Edinson Díaz as Taxi Driver
- Pesquinel Martínez as Executive
- Diego Thompson as Government Person
- Marcial Edwards as Congressional Officer
- Antonia Krug as Casandra
- Renata Goiri as Martina
- Joseff Messmer as Manuel

=== Cameos ===
- Sergio Campos
- Francisca García-Huidobro
- Felipe Vidal
- Carolina de Moras
- Claudia Schmidt
- Kika Silva
- Paulina Rojas
- Botota Fox
- Macarena Pizarro
- Karina Alvárez
- Karim Butte

== Awards and nominations ==
Year	Award	Category	Nominees	Result
2016	Copihue de Oro	Best TV series or miniseries		Nominated
2017	Caleuche Awards	Best leading actress	Fernanda Urrejola	Nominated
2017	Caleuche Awards	Best leading actor	Alejandro Goic	Won
2017	Caleuche Awards	Best supporting actress	Aline Küppenheim	Nominated
2017	Caleuche Awards	Best supporting actress	Manuela Oyarzún	Nominated
2017	Caleuche Awards	Best supporting actress	Trinidad González	Won
2017	Caleuche Awards	Best supporting actor	Nicolás Durán	Nominated
2017	Caleuche Awards	Best supporting actor	Pablo Schwarz	Won
2017	Caleuche Awards	Best supporting actor	Marcial Tagle	Nominated
2017	Pulsar Awards	Best music	Juan Cristóbal Meza	Nominated
2017	Platino Awards	Best Ibero-American film miniseries or teleseries		Nominated
2017	Fénix Awards	Best acting ensemble		Nominated
2017	Peabody Award	Entertainment		Nominated
