= Mamá Mechona =

- Title card
- Created by: Sergio Díaz
- Directed by: Germán Barriga; Camilo Sánchez
- Starring: Sigrid Alegría; Álvaro Espinoza; Paulo Brunetti
- Opening theme: Mamá de Ojos Mágicos by David Bisbal
- Country of origin: Chile
- Original language: Spanish
- No. of episodes: 117

Production
- Producer: Vania Portilla
- Production location: Santiago
- Running time: 45–50 minutes
- Production company: Canal 13 S.A.

Original release
- Network: Canal 13
- Release: 3 March – 19 August 2014

Related
- Primera dama; Valió la Pena

Mamá mechona (International Title: Freshman Mom) is a 2014 Chilean television series, it starts with a 40-year-old mother who dreams of studying at university. The series aired on Canal 13 from 3 March to 19 August 2014 on weekdays at 8pm for 118 episodes. It is directed by Germán Barriga and Camilo Sánchez, and starring by Sigrid Alegría.

== Cast ==
=== Main cast ===
- Sigrid Alegría as Macarena Muñoz: A 40 years old mother and university student of psychology.
- Paulo Brunetti as Rafael Amenábar: The old Argentine boyfriend of Macarena, in the present he is teacher in the same university.
- Álvaro Espinoza as Andrés Mora: He is the husband of Macarena.
- Carolina Varleta as Leticia Mora: She is the sister of Andrés and university manager.

=== Supporting cast ===
- Begoña Basauri as Silvana Cancino: She is the sister of Marisol and neighbor of the Mora's family.
- Pablo Schwarz as Reinaldo García: Husband of Marisol.
- Katyna Huberman as Marisol Cancino: Neighbor of the Mora's family, she has issues with cleanliness and excessive order.
- Álvaro Gómez as Agustín "Cucho" Valdivia: Teacher.
- Paula Sharim as Yolanda Fuentes
- Mariana Derderián as Lilian "Lili" Marín
- Hernán Contreras as Sebastián Mora
- Simón Pesutic as Benjamín Keller
- Alonso Quintero as Emmanuel Peña
- Constanza Piccoli as Millaray Valdebenito
- Francisca Walker as Paula Alcaíno
- Jaime Artus as Nicolás Alvear: Model and student.
- Daniela Nicolás as Rebeca Lorenzini
- Samuel González as Alejandro Reyes: The homosexual boy of the class.
- Dominique Gallego as Ignacia Novoa
- Catalina Castelblanco as Olivia Mora
- María Jesús Montané as Paz García
- Matias Silva as Pablo Mora
- Rodrigo Roco Contreras as Axel.
- Teresita Commentz as Colomba Castillo
- Gaspar Vigneaux as Guillermo "Memo" García.

=== Special participations ===
- María José Prieto as Valeria García
- Mónica Godoy as Bárbara Correa
- María Gracia Subercaseaux as Daniella Illanes
- Marcela del Valle as Macarena "Macaruchi" Muñoz
- Liliana García as Aurora Larrañaga

== International broadcast ==
- Malaysia – Astro Bella / Mustika HD (2015–2016)
