= La baronesa =

- Genre: Telenovela
- Created by: Verónica Saquel; Carlos Oporto
- Directed by: Patricio González
- Starring: Loreto Valenzuela; Simón Pesutic; Octavia Bernasconi
- Opening theme: "Yo no soy esa" by Mari Trini
- Country of origin: Chile
- Original language: Spanish

Production
- Executive producers: María Eugenia Rencoret; Patricio López
- Camera setup: Multi-camera
- Production company: Mazal Producciones

Original release
- Network: Mega
- Release: August 17, 2026 – present

La baronesa is a Chilean telenovela created by Verónica Saquel y Carlos Oporto and stars Loreto Valenzuela in the lead role. It premiered on Mega on August 17, 2026.

== Plot ==
Aurora is a woman who not only seeks to uphold the prestige and traditions of her clan, but also to maintain control over the lives of everyone around her. From childhood, she was distinguished by her striking appearance, beauty, and strong character, earning her the nickname "The Baroness". Her gambling addiction will lead her to risk her most precious possessions against Javier, a young man who will challenge her at the clandestine casino she frequents.

== Cast ==
- Loreto Valenzuela as Aurora Valdés
- Octavia Bernasconi as Emilia Márquez
- Simón Pesutic as Javier Toledo
- Francisca Armstrong as Paula Márquez
- Andrew Bargsted as Nicolás Ortiz
- Carlos Díaz as Antonio Márquez
- Lorena Bosch as Clara Faúndez
- Francisco Reyes Cristi as Daniel Márquez
- Patricio Achurra as Roberto Márquez
- Catalina Guerra as Andrea Núñez
- César Caillet as León Insulza
- Katyna Huberman as Francesca Ortiz
- Francisco Ossa as Samuel Toledo
- María Jesús Godoy as Catalina Toledo

== Reception ==
=== Ratings ===
Season	Episodes	First aired		Last aired	
Season	Episodes	Date	Rating (millions)	Date	Rating (millions)
1	TBA	August 17, 2026	0.89	TBA	TBD
