= Pablo Schwarz =

Chilean actor

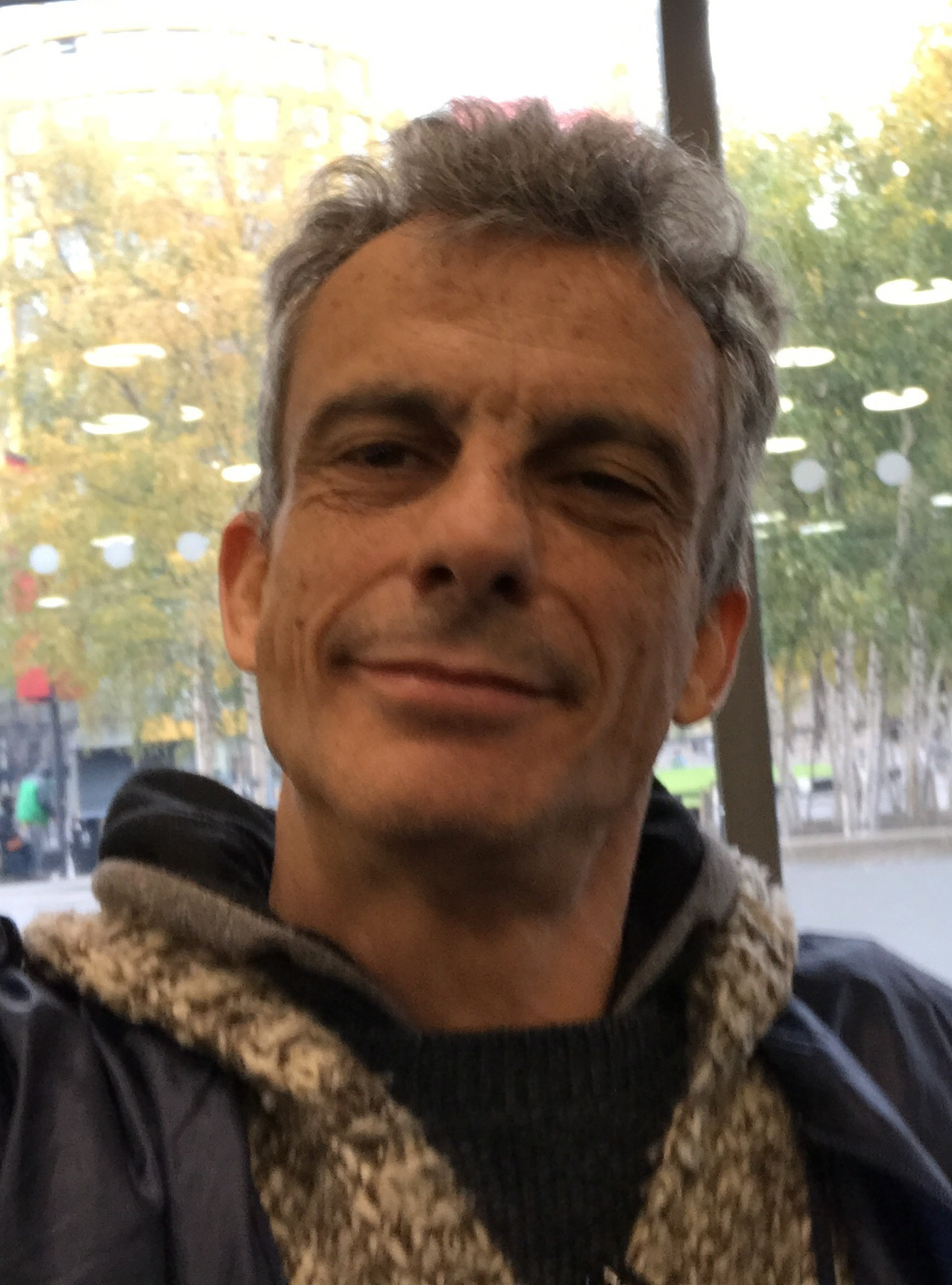
- Born: 9 October 1970 (age 55); Santiago, Chile
- Occupation: Actor
- Years active: 1990–present

Pablo Alfonso Schwarz Rabinovich (born Santiago, 9 October 1970) is a Chilean actor, noted for his extensive television, theater and film career.

Raised in a family of teachers and actors, he began his theatrical career when he was only 9 years old, acting for the English-speaking company "Santiago Stage". Schwarz has made more than twenty characters for Chilean television and has appeared in more than 20 theatrical works in Chile and the world. Schwarz is widely known for his character "Juan del Burro" in the soap opera Sucupira, broadcast on TVN in 1996. His participation in the film Cachimba by Silvio Caiozzi earned him a nomination for best actor by the Association of Show Journalists, as well as his role as "Iturra" from the series "Bala Loca" gave him the Altazor 2017 as best supporting actor.

He is also dedicated to music, drummer of the band Maraca, which he formed together with the actor Néstor Cantillana. He played in the band Indio Loco alongside musicians and actors Mauricio Diocares, Antonio de la Fuente and Gustavo Becerra, with frequent performances in Santiago and other Chilean cities.

== Filmography ==
=== Films ===
Films
Year	Film	Role	Director
1996	El encierro		Marcelo Ferrari
2002	Fragmentos urbanos	Tomás	Antonino Ballestrazzi y Sebastián Campos
2004	Cachimba	Marcos Ruiz	Silvio Caiozzi
2007	Life Kills Me	Dead	Sebastián Silva
2009	Toto, un artista del hambre	Toto	Pablo Stephens
2012	Caleuche	Pedro Millalobos	Jorge Olguín
2016	Fragmentos de Lucía	Luís	Jorge Yacoman
2016	Prueba de actitud		Fabrizio Copano
2016	Neruda		Pablo Larraín
2017	Niñas Araña		Guillermo Helo
2018	And Suddenly the Dawn	Luciano	Silvio Caiozzi
2018	Calzones rotos		Arnaldo Valsecchi
2019	No basta con amar		Cristián Mamani
2020	Detrás de la lluvia		Valeria Sarmiento
2023	History and Geography		Bernardo Quesney
2023	The Movie Teller		Lone Scherfig
2024	A Yard of Jackals		Diego Figueroa

=== Telenovelas ===
Telenovela
Year	Telenovela	Role	Channel
1992	Trampas y caretas	Daniel Tapia	TVN
1993	Ámame	Claudio Baumann	TVN
1994	Rojo y miel	Hugo Flores	TVN
1995	Estúpido cupido	Gonzalo Tagle	TVN
1996	Sucupira	Juan «Del Burro» Aravena	TVN
1997	Oro verde	Lautaro «Tallo» Meneses	TVN
1998	Iorana	Andrés Maturana	TVN
1999	La Fiera	Santos Bahamonde	TVN
2000	Romané	Mirko Dinamarca	TVN
2001	Pampa Ilusión	Serafín Gálvez «Puro Pellejo»	TVN
2002	El circo de las Montini	Danilo Quinteros «Payaso Tallarín»	TVN
2004	Los Pincheira	Naim Abu Kassem	TVN
2005	Los Capo	Guido Veroli	TVN
2006	Disparejas	Tadeo Espinoza	TVN
2006	Floribella	Evaristo	TVN
2007	Corazón de María	Manuel Rodríguez	TVN
2008	Lola	Hugo Urquieta	Canal 13
2009	Cuenta conmigo	Waldo Peña	Canal 13
2010	Feroz	Jacinto Fonseca	Canal 13
2010	Primera dama	Domingo Fernández	Canal 13
2011	Peleles	Rudolph Tapia «El alemán»	Canal 13
2013	Las Vega's	Boris Vallejos	Canal 13
2013	Soltera otra vez	Maestro Gobinda	Canal 13
2014	Mamá Mechona	Reinaldo García	Canal 13
2014	Chipe libre	Carlos Loyola	Canal 13

=== TV series ===
Series
Year	Serie	Role	Channel
1996	La buhardilla	Nicolás Van Vessel	TVN
1997	Sucupira, la comedia	Juan «Del Burro» Aravena	TVN
2007	Herederos		TVN
2007	Mi primera vez	Samuel	TVN
2007	Huaquiman y Tolosa	Pablo "Escarabajo" Órdenes	Canal 13
2007	Héroes	Santiago Florín	Canal 13
2008	Los 80	Sargento Morales	Canal 13
2012	El diario secreto de una profesional	Franco	TVN
2013	Prófugos	Johnny	HBO
2015	Mierda, mierda, mierda	Él mismo – presentador	TVN.cl
2016	Bala Loca	Nelson Iturra	Chilevisión

=== Theatre ===
- 1992 - "History of Blood." Teatro de La Memoria. Directed by Alfredo Castro.
- 1992 to 1993 - "Daedalus in the Belly of the Beast." Teatro de La Memoria. Directed by Alfredo Castro.
- 1994 - "El Tony Chico," by Luis Alberto Heiremans. Directed by Cristián Campos - Juanucho.
- 1994 - "The Little Kitchen."
- 1994 - Waiting for Godot, by Samuel Beckett. Directed by Mauricio Pesutic.
- 1994 to 1995 - Bent. Directed by Amílcar Borges.
- 1996 - Human Remains and the True Nature of Love. Directed by Francisco Melo.
- 1997 - Brunch.
- 2000 - Cinema Utopia, by Ramón Griffero. Teatro Fin de Siglo - "The Usher."
- 2001 - Eva Perón, by Copi. Directed by Marcial di Fonzo Bo - The Nurse, Eva.
- 2002 - Oedipus, by André Gide - Directed by Carlos Bórquez - Oedipus.
- 2003 to 2004 - In the Blood. Directed by Carlos Osorio - Susan Lori Parks.
- 2006 - Disaffection - Raúl Miranda for La Minimale Company.
- 2006 to 2007 - Who Stole the Mona Lisa? Written and directed by Vittorio Di Girolamo.
- 2007 - I Dream of a Revolver, by Lola Arias. Directed by Néstor Cantillana - Participated as a musician.
- 2007 to 2008 - No One Is a Prophet in Their Own Mirror, by Jorge Díaz. Directed by Paulina García - El Chema.
- 2008 - The House of God, by Marco Antonio de la Parra. Directed by Paulina García - Pedro, the Brute.
- 2009 - North, by Alejandro Moreno. Directed by Víctor Carrasco.
- 2009 - Gertrude, the Scream, by Howard Baker, for the European Drama Showcase - Claudio.
- 2010 - Jorge González Died, by Pablo Paredes. Directed by Sebastián Jaña - Jorge.
- 2011 - Love Is a Sniper, by Lola Arias. Directed by Néstor Cantillana - The Boxer.
- 2011 - Whispers, by David Leddy. Directed by Constanza Brieba - Moth.
- 2013 - Dancing for Dead Eyes, by Juan Radrigán. Directed by Víctor Carrasco - Lion.
- 2014 - Sonata for a Raven. Directed by Constanza Thümler - Tell-Tale Heart.
- 2016 - Gospodin, by Philipp Löhle. Directed by Néstor Cantillana - Gospodin
- 2017 - Mapuche Night by Marcelo Leonart. Directed by Marcelo Leonart - Juan Ignacio
- 2018 - Alessandra's Iguana by Ramón Griffero. Directed by Ramón Griffero for the Chilean National Theatre (TNCH)
- 2019 - Horace by Heiner Müller. Directed by Néstor Cantillana
- 2021 - The Barking of the Butterflies by Mauricio Pesutic. Directed by Mauricio Pesutic
- 2021 - The Tempest Project by William Shakespeare. Adapted by Peter Brook. Directed by Peter Brook and Marie Hélène Estienne - Prospero
- 2022 - Portrait of a Woman Who One Day Looked at the Moon and Thought It Was Fake by Carla Zúñiga. Directed by Manuel Morgado.
