= Amanda (Chilean TV series) =

- Created by: Luis Ponce
- Written by: Luis Ponce; Daniela Lillo; Felipe Montero; María Luisa Hurtado
- Directed by: Matías Stagnaro
- Starring: Daniela Ramírez; Felipe Contreras; Carlos Díaz; Álvaro Gómez; Ignacio Garmendia; Pedro Campos; Loreto Valenzuela; Ignacia Baeza; Adela Secall
- Country of origin: Chile
- Original language: Spanish
- No. of seasons: 1
- No. of episodes: 170

Production
- Executive producer: Daniela Demicheli
- Camera setup: Multi-camera
- Production companies: Mega; AGTV Producciones

Original release
- Network: Mega
- Release: November 22, 2016 – July 25, 2017

Amanda is a Chilean telenovela produced by AGTV Producciones that premiered on Mega on November 22, 2016 and ended on July 25, 2017. It stars Daniela Ramírez, Felipe Contreras and Carlos Díaz.

== Plot ==
Margarita Gálvez is a young woman who has suffered a drastic moment in her life, she was raped by four brothers, sons of the powerful Santa Cruz family. 14 years later Margarita returns with a new identity, Amanda Solís, to seek justice against these four brothers. Amanda works in the Santa Cruz hacienda as Catalina Minardi's nurse and quickly starts to earn the appreciation and trust of the family, without anyone suspecting her true intentions.

== Cast ==
- Daniela Ramírez as Amanda Solís / Margarita Gálvez
  - Rocío Toscano as Young Margarita
- Felipe Contreras as Víctor Reyes / Víctor Santa Cruz
  - Matías Burgos as Young Víctor
- Carlos Díaz as Luciano Santa Cruz
- Álvaro Gómez as Claudio Santa Cruz
  - Rodrigo Walker as Young Claudio
- Ignacio Garmendia as Mateo Santa Cruz
  - Joseff Messmer as Young Mateo
- Pedro Campos as Bruno Santa Cruz
  - Martín Elgueta as Young Bruno
- Loreto Valenzuela as Catalina Minardi
- Ignacia Baeza as Josefina Undurraga
- Adela Secall as Gloria Cisternas
- Josefina Velasco as Elcira Morales
- Teresita Reyes as Yolanda Salgado
- Carolina Arredondo as Melisa Arenas
- Ariel Mateluna as Leonel "Leo" Reyes
- Otilio Castro as Juvenal Reyes
- Bárbara Mundt as Gladys Aguirre
- Teresita Commentz as Anita Santa Cruz
- María de los Ángeles Burrows as Celeste Cisternas
- Emilia Neut as Pilar Santa Cruz
- Borja Larraín as Diego Santa Cruz
- Jaime Omeñaca as Miguel Gálvez
- Osvaldo Silva as Alfonso Undurraga
- Caterina Espinosa as Bernardita Del Valle
- Sebastián Arrigorriaga as Juan José Palacios
- Camilo Polanco as José "Pepe" Céspedes
- Simón Pascal as "El Negro" Lara
- Francisco González as Guillermo "El Loco Guille"
- Felipe Castro as Gabriel Rubinstein
- Ignacio Susperreguy as Fernando "Feña"
- Mónica Illanes as Andrea Curinao
- Nahuel Cantillano as Daniel Quintana
- Scarleth Flores as La Cirujana
- Ignacio Cárdenas as El Toro

== Ratings ==
| Season | Episodes | First aired | | Last aired | | Average |
| Season | Episodes | Date | Rating | Date | Rating | Average |
|---|---|---|---|---|---|---|
| 1 | 170 | November 22, 2016 | 21.1 | July 25, 2017 | 31.6 | 19.8 |
