= Carlos Díaz León =

Chilean actor

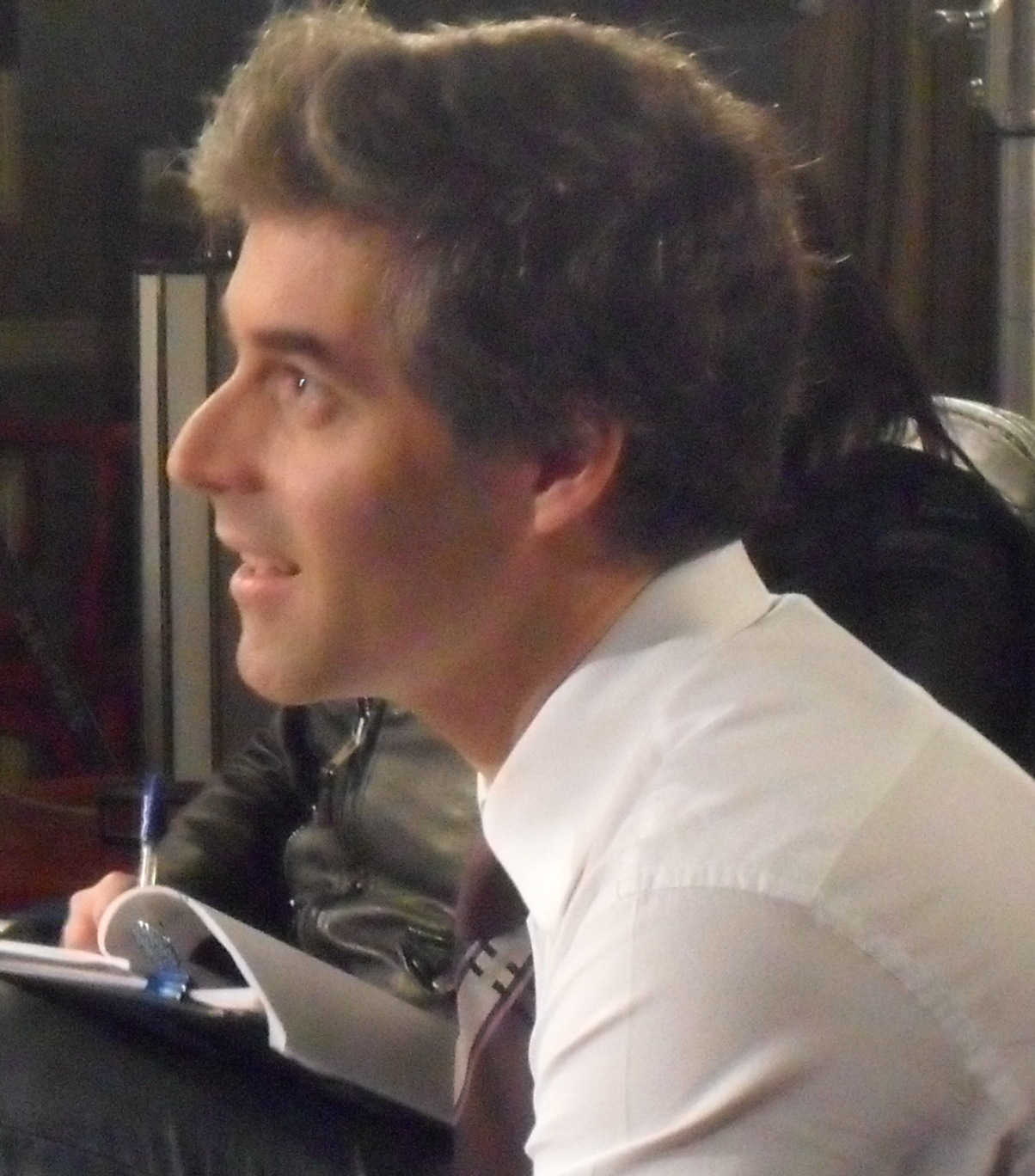
- Díaz in 2010
- Born: Carlos Eugenio Díaz León; 4 November 1972 (age 53); Santiago de Chile, Chile
- Education: University of Chile
- Occupations: Actor voice actor
- Spouse: Camila Andrea Videla Wilson (m. 1996)
- Children: Gaspar Díaz Videla; Sara Díaz Videla

Carlos Eugenio Díaz León is a Chilean actor and director.

== Biography ==
He completed basic and secondary education at Saint George's College and has a degree in arts with a major in theatre performance from the University of Chile.

He has participated in several soap operas and series on Canal 13: Champaña (1994), El amor está de moda (1995), Amor a domicilio (1995), Adrenalina (1996), Más que amigos (2002), Tentación (2004), Primera dama (2010), Río Oscuro (2019). He has also been part of the casts of Mega soap operas: Rossabella (1997), A todo dar (1998), Algo está cambiando (1999), Montecristo (2006), Amanda (2016), Verdades ocultas (2017–2022) and Juego de ilusiones (2023).

He is also known as a dubbed actor in Spanish for series such as That '70s Show (Eric) and LazyTown (Stingy).

Since 2000, he has been a professor at Duoc UC, where he was director of the acting program at the San Carlos de Apoquindo campus. In addition, he was a professor at the Faculty of Communications at the Universidad del Desarrollo. He has been a guest professor at TISCH School of Arts, directing the play Fuenteovejuna (2010). He has also conducted workshops at Binghamton University in New York State and at New York University Abu Dhabi (NYUAD).

In 1996 during the production of Adrenalina he met fellow actress Camila Videla with whom he married soon after. They have two children; Gaspar and Sara.
