= La poseída =

- Genre: Drama
- Created by: Josefina Fernández; Julio Rojas
- Written by: Josefina Fernández; Hugo Morales; Francisca Bernardi; Juan Pablo Olave
- Directed by: Víctor Huerta
- Starring: Luciana Echeverría; Marcelo Alonso; Jorge Arecheta; Amparo Noguera; Francisco Melo; Patricia Rivadeneira; Antonia Zegers; Francisca Gavilán; César Sepúlveda; Ignacia Baeza
- Country of origin: Chile
- Original language: Spanish
- No. of episodes: 73

Production
- Executive producer: Rodrigo Sepúlveda
- Producer: Mauricio Campos
- Production locations: Santiago, Chile
- Production company: Televisión Nacional de Chile

Original release
- Network: TVN
- Release: 17 May – 12 October 2015

Related
- Dueños del paraíso; Kambal Karibal

La Poseída (English: The Possessed), is a Chilean telenovela produced, and broadcast, by TVN.

Luciana Echeverría, Marcelo Alonso and Jorge Arecheta star as the main protagonists, while Francisco Melo, Gabriel Cañas and Alicia Rodríguez as the main antagonists.

== Cast ==
- Luciana Echeverría as Carmen Marín
- Marcelo Alonso as Raimundo Zisternas
- Jorge Arecheta as Gabriel Varas
- Amparo Noguera as Sor Juana Correa
- Francisco Melo as Eleodoro Mackenna Lyon
- Patricia Rivadeneira as Ernestina Riesco
- Antonia Zegers as Asunción Mackenna Lyon
- Francisca Gavilán as Rosa Carreño
- César Sepúlveda as Joaquín Orrego
- Ignacia Baeza as María de los Ángeles Urmeneta
- Tiago Correa as Vicente Smith
- Daniela Ramírez as Micaela Rojas
- Diego Ruiz as Melchor Mackenna
- Emilia Noguera as Luisa Mackenna
- Óscar Hernández as Bernardo Urmeneta
- Taira Court as Sor Beatriz Alemparte
- Gabriel Cañas as Pedro Carreño
- Magdalena Müller as Adela Soto
- Alicia Rodríguez as Vitalia Mackenna
- Constanza Contreras as Teresita Cousiño
- Camila Roeschmann as Elena Subercaseux
- Gabriela Arancibia as Guacolda Paillán
- Francisco Ossa as Alfredo Gutiérrez
- Agustín Canales as Ignacio Orrego

=== Special participations ===
- Hugo Medina as Arzobispo
- Pablo Ausensi as Confesor
