= Luciana Echeverría =

Chilean actress and singer

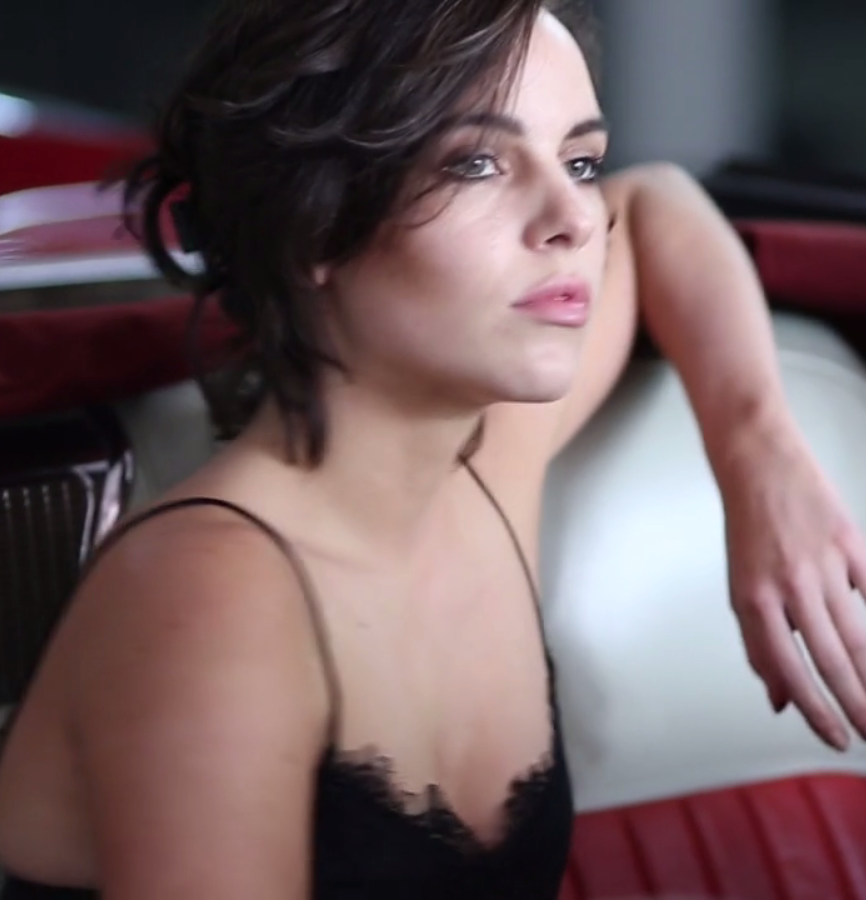
- Echeverría in 2014
- Born: Luciana Andrea Echeverría Christie; July 12, 1991 (age 34); Cauquenes, Chile
- Occupation(s): Actress, television presenter, singer
- Years active: 2007–present

Luciana Andrea Echeverría Christie (Spanish pronunciation: [luˈsjana etʃeβeˈri.a]; born 12 July 1991) is a Chilean actress, singer, and television presenter.

== Filmography ==
=== Movies ===
Year	Title	Character	Director
2012	Joven y alocada	Chica Sexy	Marialy Rivas
2013	Video Club	Daniela	Pablo Illanes

=== Television ===
Year	Titre	Character	Channel
2007–09	Karkú	Valentina Urquieta	TVN−Nickelodeon
2009	Corazón Rebelde	María José "Coté" Colucci	Canal 13
2010	Feroz	Danae Suicx	Canal 13
2010–11	Primera dama	Cristina Santander	Canal 13
2011	Témpano	Teresa Truman Graun	TVN
2011–12	Su nombre es Joaquín	Magdalena Silva	TVN
2013	Chico reality	Luz	Mega
2014	Chipe Libre	Diana Lagos	Canal 13
2015	La poseída	Carmen Marín	TVN
2016	Por Fin Solos	Natalia	TVN

==== Shows ====
- Cubox (Canal 13, 2010) – Herself/Presenter

== Other websites ==
- Luciana Echeverría at IMDb
