= Por fin solos =

- Genre: Romance
- Created by: Julio Rojas
- Written by: Luis López-Aliaga
- Starring: Luciana Echeverría; Daniel Muñoz; Francisca Gavilán; Elisa Zulueta; Gabriel Cañas; Benjamín Vicuña
- Country of origin: Chile
- Original language: Spanish
- No. of seasons: 1

Production
- Executive producer: Alejandro Burr
- Producer: Luciana Luppi
- Production locations: Santiago, Chile
- Production company: Televisión Nacional de Chile

Original release
- Network: TVN
- Release: February 24 – July 16, 2016

Related
- Juana Brava

Por Fin Solos (English: Finally Alone) is a Chilean mini-series produced and broadcast by TVN.

Elisa Zulueta, Benjamín Vicuña, Gabriel Cañas, Luciana Echeverría, Daniel Muñoz, and Francisca Gavilán star as the main protagonists.

== History ==
Catalina tells the story of Gonzalo, a young couple living in Santiago with their child. The series also features couples Franco and Natalia, and Roberto and Cecilia.

== Cast ==
- Francisca Gavilán as Cecilia
- Daniel Muñoz as Roberto
- Luciana Echeverría as Natalia Sierra
- Elisa Zulueta as Catalina Carranza
- Benjamín Vicuña as Gonzalo Muñoz
- Gabriel Cañas as Franco Farías
