= Julio Milostich =

Chilean actor

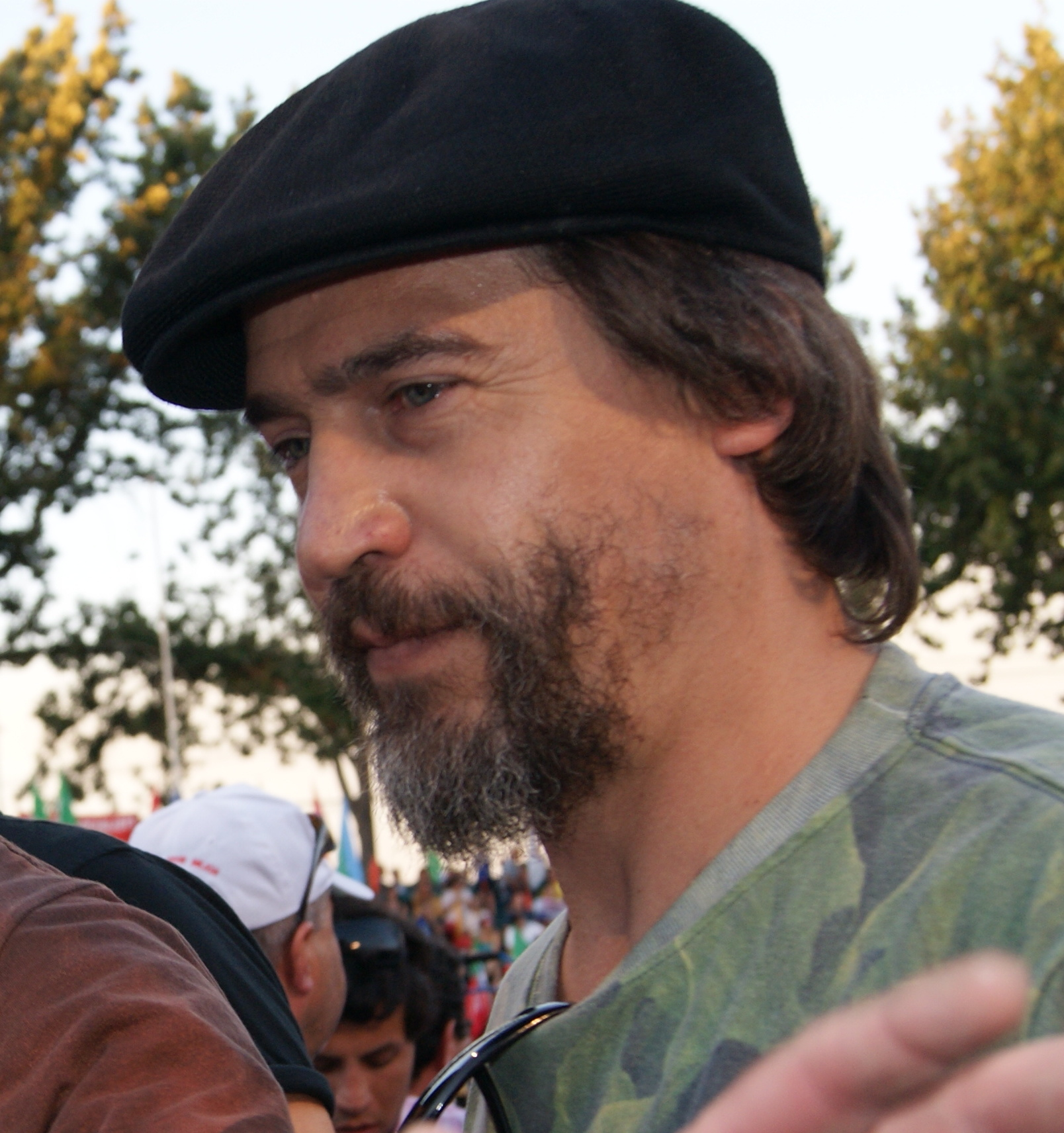
- Milostich in 2009
- Born: Julio Pelegrin Milostich Muñoz; October 5, 1966 (age 59); Punta Arenas, Chile
- Occupation: Actor
- Years active: 1988–present

Julio Pelegrin Milostich Muñoz (born October 5, 1966) is a Chilean theater, film and television actor.

Milostich was known for playing cynical and morally antagonistic characters. He has been described by many as an unconventional heartthrob. Among his most remembered roles are his portrayal of General Bernardo O'Higgins in Héroes and as José Luis Echeñique, the protagonist of El señor de La Querencia for which he won many awards.

== Career ==
Milostich was born in Punta Arenas on October 5, 1966. His father died quite young, so his mother, Magdalena Muñoz, took care of her family, made up of 5 siblings. He studied basic education at the E-20 school and continued his studies at the Liceo Salesiano San José, in Punta Arenas. Driven by the priests, in 1986 he emigrated to Santiago to study at the DRAN School of Dramatic Art

Milostich's first audition for a play was in 1988, to work on La batuta. Together with the actor and director Mateo Iribarren, he made a version of The Little Prince. Shortly afterwards, Milostich was invited to participate in Chronicle of a Death Foretold, where he met Alejandro Trejo, one of his great friends to this day, and whom he considers as his mentor. Together with him they formed the company La comarca.

Milostich's first television incursion was on TVN's Mea culpa, under the direction of Carlos Pinto.

In 2004 Milostich began to work on Channel 13, his first role in a television series being Manuel Doren for Hippie, where he arrived because the casting director of Channel 13 saw him acting in the play The Dark Shared Flight. Then he has been the permanent face of the television series of the first semester of Channel 13 in productions such as Brujas (2005), Descarado (2006), and Papi Ricky (2007).

However, Milostich's great leap came in 2007, when he played Bernardo O'Higgins in the miniseries Héroes de Canal 13, for which he was nominated for the Altazor Award in 2009. Director Ricardo Larraín, who was in charge of the project on Bernardo O'Higgins, says that he chose Milostich because of his physical resemblance to the hero. Milostich's performance of O'Higgins was considered masterful.

Thanks to Milostich's performance in the telefilm, the director María Eugenia Rencoret noticed him and signed him for two years for the drama area of TVN. During 2008 he participated in the nightly telenovela of the same television station, El señor de La Querencia, where he played José Luis Echeñique, the owner of La Querencia and the telenovela's main antagonist. Although Milostich said that, "Playing the bad guy is a great challenge," he also claimed to be happy with his latest performance on television. Despite this, the stress and pressure of the character would eventually lead him to ask for a few weeks off on two occasions. Sigrid Alegría (Leonor in El Señor de La Querencia), declared that "after a very powerful year for him, a year with a character who taught him to know a threshold of emotions that was too high [...] Julio Milostich reached a limit". His deteriorating mental health and some legal problems kept him away from television for a while.

Milostich finally returned to the stage in 2009 with the play El hombre de La Mancha at the Municipal Theater of Santiago, where together with the participation of Amaya Forch and the tenor Daniel Farias, he would interpret the idealist "Don Quixote". That same year he would participate as part of the cast of actors in the electoral strip for the presidential elections for the campaign of candidate Jorge Arrate. The work would be put on the billboard again in the same venue during the summer of 2010, within the framework of the Santiago a Mil Festival. He returned to Channel 13 in 2010 acting in the TV series Primera dama and in 2014 in the drama Secretos en el Jardín.

In 2014, Milostich played Rodrigo Pérez de Uriondo, a Spanish captain who arrived at the Villarrica fort during the Arauco War between the Spanish and the Mapuches in the series Sitiados directed by Nicolás Acuña. He was accompanied among others in the cast such as Andrés Parra, Marimar Vega and Benjamín Vicuña. The series was released on Fox and on TVN, that year.

In 2019 Milostich starred in the drama Río Oscuro alongside Claudia Di Girolamo and Amparo Noguera on Channel 13. In the same year, he appeared on Gemelas de Chilevisión.

== Filmography ==
=== Film ===
Year	Film	Role	Director
2015	Vacaciones en familia	Juan Kelly	Ricardo Carrasco
2016	Tierra Yerma	Jorge	Miriam Heard
2016	Neruda	Entrevistador de Radio	Pablo Larraín
2016	Un hombre interesado en la justicia	Coronel	Jaime Amunategui
2017	Libertad	Sebastián	Ariel Rafalowski
2017	Nublado, cubierto y lluvia	Alberto	Fernando Solís
2018	Contra el demonio		José Miguel Zúñiga
2019	Sumergida		Andrés Finat
2020	Alto Hospicio		Jorge Olguín
2023	Cacique mulato		Jorge Grez

=== Telenovelas ===
Year	Telenovela	Character	Channel
2004	Hippie	Manuel Doren	Canal 13
2005	Brujas	Fabián Mainardi	Canal 13
2006	Descarado	Marco Antonio Ferrada	Canal 13
2007	Papi Ricky	Renato del Río	Canal 13
2008	Viuda Alegre	Alfonso Correa	TVN
2008	El señor de La Querencia	José Luis Echeñique	TVN
2009–2010	Conde Vrolok	Fraile Faustino Rengifo	TVN
2010	Primera Dama	Leonardo Santander	Canal 13
2013	Las Vega's	Álvaro Sandoval	Canal 13
2013–2014	Secretos en el jardín	Francisco O'Ryan	Canal 13
2016	Señores papis	Eduardo Bachi (Lalo)	Mega
2017	Verdades ocultas	Pedro Mackenna	Mega
2019–2020	Gemelas	Manuel Vázquez de Acuña	Chilevision
2019	Río oscuro	Juan Echeverría	Canal 13
2023	Juego de ilusiones	Julián Mardones / Guillermo Mardones	Mega

=== TV Series ===
Year	Serie	Character	Channel
1994	Mea culpa	Alfonso Salinas	TVN
2003	La vida es una lotería	Pablo	TVN
2004	Justicia para todos		TVN
2007	Héroes	General Bernardo O'Higgins	Canal 13
2008	Cárcel de Mujeres 2	Ricardo Cisternas	TVN
2012	Vida por vida	Doctor Álex Mackenna	Canal 13
2015	Puerto Hambre	Gobernador Pedro Sarmiento de Gamboa	UCV Televisión
2015	Sitiados	Capitán Rodrigo Pérez de Uriondo	TVN/ Fox
2016	Bala loca	General Esteban Larrondo	Chilevisión
2016	Neruda, la serie	Locutor radial	Mega
2017	Irreversible	Aníbal Valenzuela	Canal 13
2018	Mary & Mike	Guillermo	Chilevisión / Space

== Theatre ==
- Crónica de una muerte anunciada
- Galileo Galilei
- La comarca del jazmín
- La marejada
- Fantasmas borrachos
- La zapatera prodigiosa
- Provincia Kapital (2004)
- El loco afán
- El desvarío
- El hombre de La Mancha (2009) – Miguel de Cervantes/Don Quijote de la Mancha
- My Fair Lady (2010)
- Tenías que ser tú (2013) – Vito Pignoli
- Pobre Inés sentada ahí (2016)
