= Mala leche =

Mala Leche
- Film poster
- Directed by: León Errázuriz
- Written by: León Errázuriz; Matías Ovalle
- Cinematography: Andrés Garcés
- Edited by: León Errázuriz
- Music by: Miguel Miranda; José Miguel Tobar
- Release date: 16 April 2004
- Running time: 100 minutes
- Country: Chile
- Language: Spanish

Bad Blood (Spanish: Mala leche, lit. 'Bad milk') is a 2004 Chilean crime drama action film directed by León Errázuriz. It won the Horizons Award at 52nd San Sebastián International Film Festival.

== Plot ==
The story revolves around two young delinquent friends who are involved in a drug business that goes awry. Their troubles escalate when they lose both the money and the drugs, putting them at risk of being killed by the drug dealer. In order to retrieve the money and avoid being harmed, they embark on a series of crimes within a tight two-day timeframe. The film offers a fresh and realistic perspective of Santiago that differs from the typical postcard-perfect image often portrayed.

== Cast ==
- Mauricio Diocares
- Luis Dubó
- Tamara Garea
- Adela Secall
- José Herrera
- Loreto Moya
- Ramón Llao
- Camila Leiva

== See also ==
- Cinema of Chile
