= Jailbreak Pact =

- Theatrical release poster
- Directed by: David Albala
- Written by: David Albala; Cecilia Ruz; Loreto Caro-Valdés; Susana Quiroz-Saavedra
- Produced by: David Albala
- Starring: Benjamín Vicuña; Roberto Farías; Francisca Gavilán; Amparo Noguera; Víctor Montero; Diego Ruiz; Catalina Martín; Eusebio Arenas
- Cinematography: Jorge González
- Edited by: David Albala; José Córdova-Llanos
- Music by: Juan Cristóbal Meza
- Production companies: Calibre 71 Producciones; Storyboard Media
- Distributed by: 20th Century Fox
- Release date: 23 January 2020
- Running time: 138 minutes
- Country: Chile
- Language: Spanish
- Budget: $2.8 million

Jailbreak Pact (Spanish: Pacto de fuga) is a 2020 Chilean action thriller film directed by David Albala (in his directorial debut) who co-wrote the script along with Cecilia Ruz, Loreto Caro-Valdés and Susana Quiroz-Saavedra. It stars Benjamín Vicuña, Roberto Farías, Francisca Gavilán, Amparo Noguera, Víctor Montero, Diego Ruiz, Catalina Martín and Eusebio Arenas. It is inspired by the prison escape that occurred on 30 January 1990, known as Operation Success in the Public Jail of Santiago.

The film was named on the shortlist for Chilean's entry for the Academy Award for Best International Feature Film at the 93rd Academy Awards, but it was not selected.

== Synopsis ==
In the Santiago Public Prison, 24 inmates secretly dug a tunnel over 80 meters long, hiding 55 tons of earth within the prison. The construction, which took them more than a year, was completed using nothing more than a screwdriver. Neither the neighboring prisoners nor the guards who monitored them daily uncovered the plan, which ultimately led to the escape of 49 inmates in one of the most astonishing jailbreaks in Chilean criminal history.

== Cast ==
The actors participating in this film are:

- Benjamín Vicuña as León Vargas
- Roberto Farías as Rafael Jiménez
- Víctor Montero as Germán Sánchez
- Francisca Gavilán as Paulina Baeza
- Amparo Noguera as Fabiola Pizarro
- Diego Ruiz as Oscar Lira
- Eusebio Arenas as Dr. Patricio Velasquez
- Mateo Iribarren as Prosecutor Andrade
- Willy Semler as Warden Jorquera
- Patricio Contreras as Rodolfo Ternicier
- Roberto Peña as Lalo Sotomayor
- Pablo Teillier as Mario Quezada
- Gonzalo Canelo as "Bigote"
- Luis Dubó as Hugo Salgado
- Hugo Medina as Father Gerard Fovet
- Christian Quevedo as Sergeant Bravo - 'El Perro'
- Mauricio Rojas as Sergeant Arévalo - 'El Mozo'
- Edinson Díaz as Sergeant Castro - 'Paco Braulio'
- Jose Luis Aguilera as Sergeant González - 'Care'Poker'
- Catalina Martin as Quena
- Jorge Antezana as Pancho Antilef
- Eduardo Reyes as Emilio Muñoz
- Vladimir Huaquiñir as Nicolai Castillo
- Sebastián Ramírez as Xavier Rojas
- Pablo Muza as Benjamín Canto
- Sergio Díaz as José Caro
- Roberto Cobian as Luis Fernández
- Serge Santana as Sergio Llanos
- Mauricio Roa as "El Oso"
- César Quintanilla as "El Econo"
- Julio Fuentes as Alejandro Lira
- Miguel Toro as Benito Aliaga
- Alberto Ellena as Gastón Velásquez
- Amaia Cardemil as Matilde
- Simón Beltrán as Boris
- Jaime Muñoz as Joaquín
- Franco Vidal as Felipe Osorio
- Juan Díaz Garay as Cape Droguett
- Yerko García as Solorza

== Production ==
Principal photography began on 22 November 2017, and ended on 15 January 2018, in Santiago, Chile.

== Release ==
Jailbreak Pact was scheduled to premiere on 24 October 2019, in Chilean theaters, but it was delayed due to the social outbreak that occurred in Chile in October of that same year. Finally, it was released on 23 January 2020, in Chilean theaters.

== Reception ==
=== Box-office ===
Jailbreak Pact sold 7,092 theater tickets on its first day of release. It increased to 125,626 viewers for its second week in theaters. By the fourth week, the film grossed $250,000. It ended its run in theaters having attracted 225,159 viewers to Chilean theaters.

=== Critical reception ===
Phuong Le from The Guardian highlights the acting work of the main actors who manage to be exciting, although they become overshadowed by other elements such as forced and overexposed dialogues. However, he concludes that it still manages to be entertaining and remarkable for David Albala's directorial debut.
