= Mansacue =

- Theatrical release poster
- Directed by: Marco Enríquez-Ominami
- Screenplay by: Yusef Rumie
- Based on: La vida es una lotería by TVN
- Produced by: Cristián Warner
- Starring: Cristián Riquelme; Dayana Amigo; Luis Dubó; Patricio Strahovsky; Carolina Oliva; Fernando Gómez Rovira; Claudia Pérez; Mauricio Pesutic
- Cinematography: Gabriel del Carril
- Edited by: Aracelis Ariza
- Music by: Jorge Arriagada
- Production company: Rivas y Rivas
- Release date: April 24, 2008
- Running time: 90 minutes
- Country: Chile
- Language: Spanish

Mansacue is a 2008 Chilean comedy film directed by Marco Enríquez-Ominami and written by Yusef Rumie. It has a choral cast headed by Cristián Riquelme, Dayana Amigo, Luis Dubó, Patricio Strahovsky, Carolina Oliva, Fernando Gómez Rovira, Claudia Pérez and Mauricio Pesutic. It is based on the television series La vida es una lotería by TVN. It premiered on April 24, 2008, in Chilean theaters.

== Synopsis ==
In the first story, an upper-class couple loses a winning Kino ticket and must track it down to the wallet of a drunk from the fringes. In the second, a geologist and his girlfriend must keep their fortune a secret to avoid the wrath of the inhabitants of a town where everything is shared.

== Cast ==
The actors participating in this film are:

=== El vuelo de KINO ===
- Cristián Riquelme as House Buyer 1
- Sigrid Alegría as House Buyer 2
- Luis Dubó as Brito
- Carolina Oliva as Paola
- Fernando Gómez-Rovira as Eric
- Ana Reeves as Denizen
- Mauricio Pesutic as Sergio
- Alejandro Trejo as Denizen 1
- Juan Alcayaga as Denizen 2
- Peter Rock as Detective
- Claudia Pérez as The Girl

=== Miti - Mota ===
- Dayana Amigo as Tere Sánchez
- Cristián Riquelme as Mario Restovic
- Teresa Hales as Store Clerk
- Luis Dubó as Juanito
- Julio González Littin as Julio
- Patricio Strahovsky as Soldier
- Teresa Münchmeyer as Juanito's mother
- Vladimir Huaiquinir as Cariquima's Neighbor

=== El banco ===
- Karen Doggenweiler as Bank Clerk
- Daniel Vilches as Bank Customer

== Production ==
Principal photography took place between 2005 and 2006 in Cariquima and La Pincoya, Santiago.

== Reception ==
Mansacue in its 6 weeks in theaters attracted 8,234 viewers, collecting $20,249,120 Chilean pesos.
