= Francisca Gavilán =

Chilean film, theater, and television actress and singer

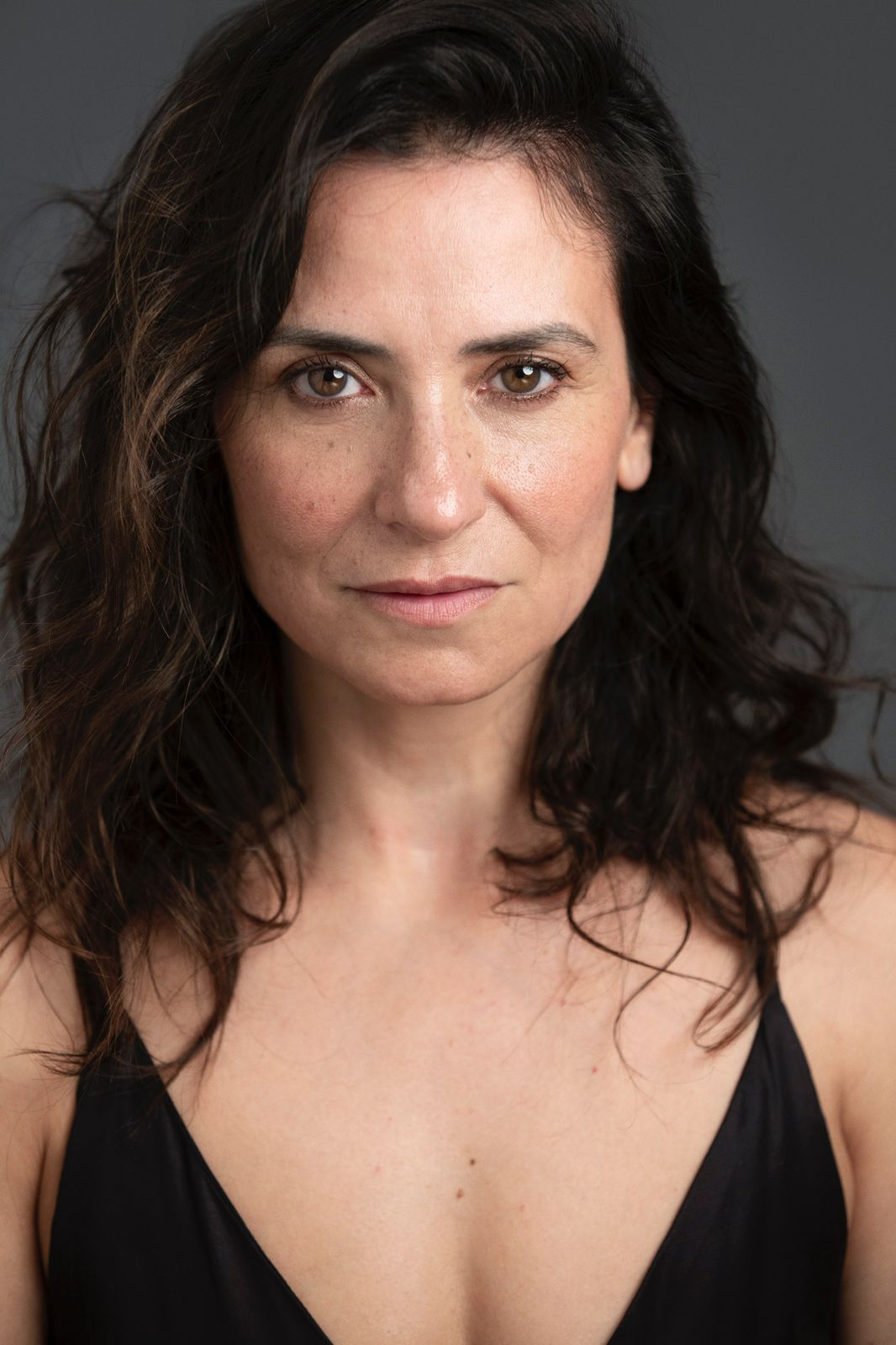
- Born: María Francisca Gavilán Valladares; 27 June 1973 (age 52); Santiago, Chile
- Occupation(s): Actress, singer
- Years active: 1997–present
- Children: Joaquín Schwarz; Simón Tironi
- Awards: Altazor Award (2012, 2013); Huelva Festival Best Actress (2011); Pedro Sienna Award (2011)

María Francisca Gavilán Valladares (born 27 June 1973) is a Chilean film, theater, and television actress and singer.

== Acting career ==
Francisca Gavilán graduated from the Theater School of Fernando González in 1994, with the play Madame de Sade, directed by Rodrigo Pérez. In this academy she was a student of Luz Jiménez, who has been one of her main artistic influences. She also counts as influences Tamara Acosta – who was her partner at theater school and on the cast of Los Pincheira and Papi Ricky – Amparo Noguera, and Paulina Urrutia.

She has participated in several Chilean television series, beginning with Romané on Televisión Nacional de Chile (TVN) and Piel canela on Canal 13, and then returning to TVN with more central roles in Puertas adentro, Los Pincheira, and Los Capo. In 2007 she returned to Canal 13 to play Andrea Kuntz on the series Papi Ricky, and in 2010 she played a small role on the series Los 80.

In cinema she has acted in the films Monos con navaja (2000), Ulysses (2010), and in 2011 she was the protagonist of the Violeta Parra biopic Violeta Went to Heaven, directed by Andrés Wood.

== Musical career ==
In Violeta Went to Heaven, Gavilán interpreted the songs of Parra sung in the movie.

In 2016 she appeared on the program Puro Chile with La Regia Orquesta, where she performed songs by Parra and from the musical La negra Ester.

== Filmography ==
Year	Title	Role	Notes
2000	Monos con navaja	Simone	
2010	Ulysses	Flavia	
2011	Violeta Went to Heaven	Violeta Parra	Altazor Award for Best Film Actress; Pedro Sienna Award for Best Female Leading Performance; Colón de Plata for Best Film Actress; Mayahuel de Plata Award for Best Actress; Trophy Spondylus for Best Film Actress; Palmarés Award for Best Actress
2013	El Tío	Cameo	
2013	The Quispe Girls	Luciana Quispe	
2015	Aurora		
2016	Mala Junta	Andrea	
2016	Niñas arañas		
2020	Jailbreak Pact	Paulina Baeza	

== TV serials ==
Year	Title	Role	Channel
2000	Romané	Berta Faúndez	TVN
2001	Piel canela	Genoveva Ramírez	Canal 13
2003	Puertas adentro	Bernardina López	TVN
2004	Los Pincheira	Rosita Luna	TVN
2004	Ídolos	Margara Sandoval	TVN
2005	Los Capo	Libertad Alvarado	TVN
2007	Papi Ricky	Andrea Kuntz	Canal 13
2012	Separados	Rosario Aranda	TVN
2013	Secretos en el jardín	Romina Retamal	Canal 13
2014	Las 2 Carolinas	Jacqueline Duarte	Chilevisión
2015	La poseída	Rosa Carreño	TVN
2016	Un diablo con ángel	Ximena Muñoz	TVN
2017	Perdona nuestros pecados	Silvia Corcuera	Mega
2025	El jardín de Olivia	Gloria González	Mega

== TV series ==
Year	Title	Role	Channel
2005	El día menos pensado	Carola	TVN
2009	Los 80	Vendedora	Canal 13
2011	Los archivos del cardenal	Susana	TVN
2012	Violeta Went to Heaven, the Series	Violeta Parra	Chilevisión
2015	Zamudio	Jacqueline Vera	TVN
2016	Por fin solos	Cecilia Martínez	TVN

== Theater ==
- Hedda Gabler (directed by Claudia di Girolamo)
- Lady marginal (directed by Claudia di Girolamo)
- Aquí están (directed by Claudia di Girolamo)
- Mina antipersonal (directed by Claudia di Girolamo)
- La cocinita (directed by Fernándo Villalobos)
- Restos Humanos y la Verdadera Naturaleza del Amor (directed by Francisco Melo)
- Sonata de otoño (directed by Carla Acchiardi)
- Mun Chile (directed by Rodrigo Achondo)
- NN.29.10 (directed by Rodrigo Achondo)
- La Condición Humana (directed by Mateo Iribarren)
- Ma vie de Chandell (directed by Víctor Carrasco)
- Provincia Kapital (directed by Rodrigo Pérez)
- Cartas a Tomás (directed by Rodrigo Pérez)
- Carita de Emperaora (directed by Felipe Hurtado)
- Handicam (directed by Eduardo Pávez Goye)
- Libres (directed by Francisco Melo)
- Doña Rosita the Spinster (directed by Héctor Noguera)
- The Broken Jug (directed by Francisco Pérez-Bannen)

== Awards ==
- Pedro Sienna Award: Best Female Leading Performance (Violeta Went to Heaven)
- Huelva Film Festival: Colón de Plata for Best Film Actress (Violeta Went to Heaven)
- Lima Film Festival: Special Mention – Best Actress (Violeta Went to Heaven)
- 2012 Altazor Award for Best Film Actress (Violeta Went to Heaven)
- 2012 UNASUR Film Festival: Best Film Actress (Violeta Went to Heaven)
- 2013 Altazor Award: Best Television Actress (Violeta Went to Heaven, the Series)
