= Río Oscuro =

Chilean telenovela

- Title card
- Genre: Telenovela
- Created by: Víctor Carrasco
- Written by: Andrea Franco; Claudia Hidalgo; Francisca Bernardi; Francisca Andrade
- Directed by: Cristián Mason; Roberto Rebolledo; Pablo Aedo
- Starring: Amparo Noguera; Claudia Di Girolamo; Julio Milostich; Mariana Di Girolamo; José Antonio Raffo
- Theme music composer: Aníbal Vidal
- Country of origin: Chile
- Original language: Spanish
- No. of episodes: 94

Production
- Executive producers: Matías Ovalle; Pablo Ávila
- Producers: Eduardo Alegría; Caco Muñoz
- Production locations: Lo Barnechea, Santiago, Chile
- Running time: 30-45 minutes
- Production company: AGTV Producciones

Original release
- Network: Canal 13
- Release: May 27 – November 15, 2019

Related
- Pacto de sangre

Río Oscuro (English: Dark River) is a Chilean telenovela produced by AGTV Producciones and broadcast by Canal 13 from May 27 to November 15, 2019. The series stars Amparo Noguera, Claudia Di Girolamo, Julio Milostich, Mariana Di Girolamo and José Antonio Raffo.

== Cast ==
=== Main cast ===
- Amparo Noguera as Clara Molina
- Claudia Di Girolamo as Concepción Aldunate
- Julio Milostich as Juan Echeverría
- Mariana Di Girolamo as Rosario Correa
- José Antonio Raffo as Manuel Valdivieso
- Gabriel Cañas as Alberto Echeverría

=== Supporting cast ===
- Mauricio Pesutic as Francisco Javier Guzman
- Josefina Fiebelkorn as Adela Echeverría
- Alejandra Fosalba as Angélica López
- Marcial Tagle as Custodio Pereira
- Lorena Bosch as Rosa Mardones
- Carlos Díaz as Rafael Morales
- Katyna Huberman as Josefina Cruz
- Alonso Quintero as Pedro Salgado
- Antonia Giesen as María Pereira
- Alejandro Fajardo as Claudio Baeza
- Seide Tosta as Antonia Noble
- Yohan Aguiar as Eugenio Baeza

=== Guest appearances ===
- Álvaro Morales as Fernando García
- Nelson Brodt as Mario Rodríguez
- Hugo Medina as Eusebio Llanos
- Betsy Camino as Luisa Baeza
- Elvis Fuentes as the prosecutor in the Manuel case.
- Gustavo Garcés as Jesús
