= El señor de La Querencia (2008 TV series) =

- Genre: Nighttime soap opera
- Starring: Julio Milostich; Sigrid Alegría; Álvaro Rudolphy; Alejandra Fosalba; Patricia López
- Country of origin: Chile
- Original language: Spanish
- No. of episodes: 64

Production
- Producer: Patricio López
- Production locations: Santiago and Colina

Original release
- Network: Televisión Nacional de Chile
- Release: May 12 – September 2, 2008

El Señor de la Querencia (English: The Lord of the Farm) is a nighttime soap opera broadcast by Televisión Nacional de Chile. El Señor de la Querencia is set in a rural estate in Colina, Chile in 1920. It differs from former Chilean series by the large amounts of domestic violence, sexual abuses, extortions, threats, torture and violence shown as part of the plot. Chilean minister Laura Albornoz expressed her concern about the impact of the repeatedly shown domestic violence and sexual abuses shown in the soap opera.

Starring by Julio Milostich as the main villain, as co-protagonist Sigrid Alegría and Álvaro Rudolphy.

== Cast ==
- Julio Milostich – José Luis Echeñique
- Sigrid Alegría – Leonor Amenábar
- Álvaro Rudolphy – Manuel Pradenas
- Alejandra Fosalba – Mercedes de los Ríos
- Matías Oviedo – Ignacio Echeñique
- Patricia López – María Pradenas
- Álvaro Espinoza – Buenaventura Moreno
- Bárbara Ruiz-Tagle – Leontina Aguirre
- Celine Reymond – Teresa Echeñique
- Andrés Reyes – Luis Emilio Echeñique
- Antonia Santa María – Violeta Moreno
- Begoña Basauri – Herminia Pradenas
- Lorena Bosch – Lucrecia Santa María
- Nicolás Poblete – Juan Cristóba León
- Adela Calderón – Carmen

Other Cast

- Luis Alarcón – Mr. Renato Echeñique
- Maité Fernández – Mrs. Bernarda Leiva
- Jaime Vadell – Priest
- Andrés Velasco – Alberto Salinas
- Álvaro Morales – Evaristo Pradenas
