= Adela Calderón =

Chilean actress (born 1959)

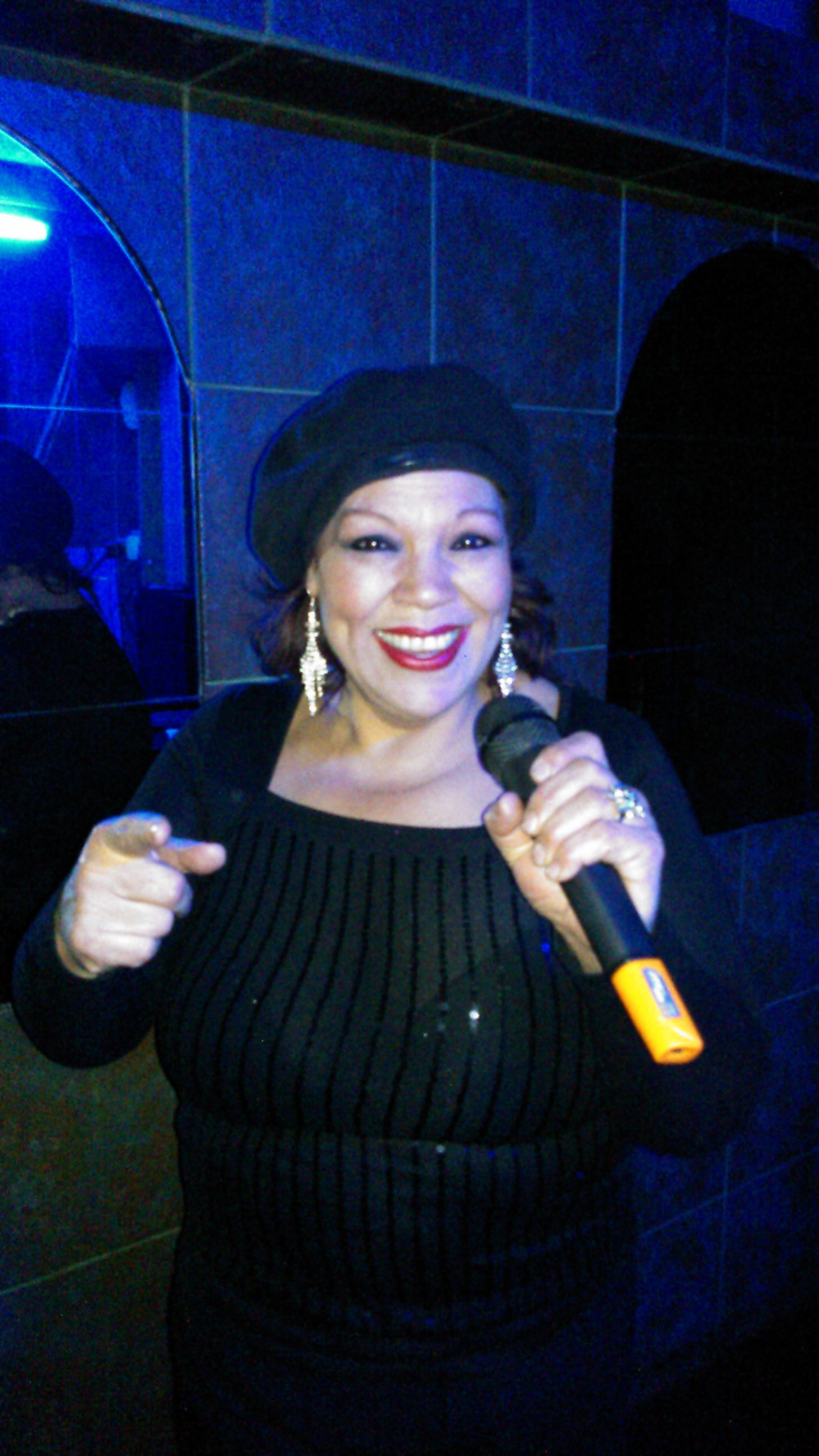
- Born: Elena Adela Calderón García; 21 February 1959 (age 66); Santiago, Chile
- Occupation(s): Actress; Comedian

Elena Adela Calderón García, known as Adela Calderón (born 21 February 1959 in Santiago) is a Chilean actress and comedienne who has appeared in television and stage.

Calderón's family faced severe hardship during the rule of Augusto Pinochet. She recalls that her family was tortured and spent time in two concentration camps, including Villa Grimaldi during her winter vacation at the age of 14. Her brothers and cousins were murdered and thrown into the Mapocho River. Her sister later died of cancer.

Calderón began appearing in Televisión Nacional de Chile (TVN) series such as Bellas y audaces and A la sombra del ángel in the late 1980s. In 2008, Adela Calderón portrayed Aunt Carmen, a "Madame" of a brothel in the series El señor de La Querencia, and the same year she was a candidate for councilor for the municipal district of Santiago. However, the following year she was remanded in custody after being arrested for drug trafficking with Garras de Amor singer Rodolfo Tarragona. In 2016 Calderón returned to television, in the teleseries El camionero for TVN.
