= Dominique Gallego =

Chilean model and TV host (born 1990)

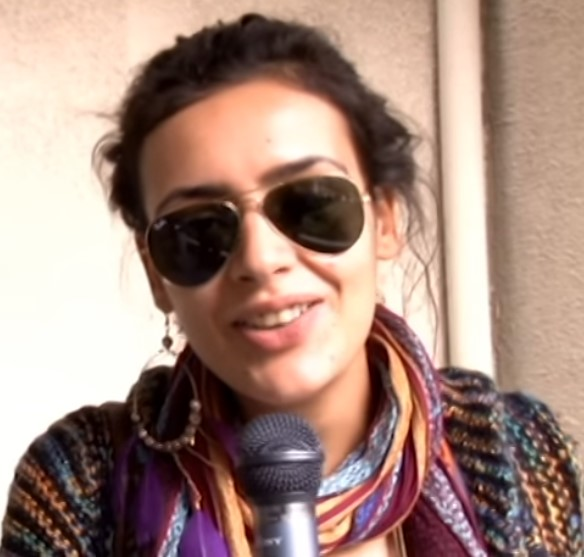
Dominique Gallego

Dominique Anastasia Gallego Williams (Santiago de Chile, 5 March 1990) is a media model, television reality personality, promoter and actress.

== Television career ==
She became known when she was seventeen years old, participating in the Pelotón reality show of Televisión Nacional de Chile. In this program she caught the attention of some means by topless bathing. The broadcast by TVN of those images was sanctioned by the Consejo Nacional de Televisión de Chile (National Council of Television of Chile) with a penalty fine. After being eliminated from the reality show, Dominique became involved increasingly in the Chilean showbiz being page of magazines and newspapers and bikini modeling for magazines and being invited to various programmes of showbiz and entertainment such as SQP, Intrusos en la Televisión and Primer Plano.

In June 2011 she entered the dating show 40 o 20 by Canal 13, where a group of men of all ages struggled to conquer her. After entering the programme, Gallego eliminated the previous protagonist, the Indian-Chilean actress and model Jennifer Mayani, following a vote by the contestants themselves. The last chapter was issued in November 2011, in which Gallego chose as the winner of Argentine model José Luis Bibbo (known as "Joche"). After she "finished" their relationship days earlier, in January 2012 both as participants enter the reality show Mundos Opuestos.

Dominique is one of the panelists of the entertainment and show business programme Alfombra Roja of Canal 13 and Saturday 18 August is model of the programme Sábado Gigante 50 años La Gala.

On 27 February 2013, Dominique Gallego was elected by the journalists Queen of the Festival of Viña del Mar.

In March 2014, Gallego acted in the telenovela of Canal 13 Mamá mechona.

Currently she maintains a relationship with lawyer Rodrigo Wainraihgt with whom she gave birth her second child, and have even talked about the possibility of marriage.

On August 22, 2016 Dominique returned to Televisión Nacional de Chile as panelist of the morning programme "Muy buenos días" (Very good morning).

== Television works ==
- Pelotón – TVN (2007–2008)
- Intrusos en la Televisión – La Red (2008)
- SQP – Chilevisión (2008)
- Teatro en Chilevisión – Chilevisión (2008)
- Mala conducta – Chilevisión (2008)
- Primer Plano – Chilevisión (2008–2009)
- Show de Goles – Chilevisión (2009)
- Mira quién habla – Mega (2010)
- 40 o 20 – Canal 13 (2011)
- Teletón 2011 (2011)
- Mundos Opuestos – Canal 13 (2012)
- Bienvenidos – Canal 13 (2012)
- Alfombra Roja – Canal 13 (2012–present)
- Sábado Gigante – Canal 13 (2012)
- Las Vega's – Canal 13 (2013)
- Generaciones cruzadas - Canal 13 (2014)
- Mamá mechona - Canal 13 (2014)
- Bienvenido 2015 - Canal 13 (2014)
- Muy Buenos Días - TVN (2016)
