= The Year of the Tiger (2011 film) =

2011 film

- Film poster
- Directed by: Sebastián Lelio
- Written by: Gonzalo Maza
- Produced by: Juan de Dios Larraín; Pablo Larraín
- Starring: Luis Dubó
- Cinematography: Miguel Littin Menz
- Release date: August 2011 (Locarno IFF)
- Running time: 82 minutes
- Country: Chile
- Language: Spanish

The Year of the Tiger (Spanish: El año del tigre) is a 2011 Chilean drama film directed by Sebastián Lelio about a prison inmate trying to find his family after the 2010 Chile earthquake.

== Cast ==
- Luis Dubó
- Sergio Hernández
- Viviana Herrera
