= Las Vega's (Chilean TV series) =

- Title card
- Genre: Comedy drama
- Created by: Javier Cuchacovic; Nicolas Wellmann
- Written by: Javier Cuchacovic; Sergio Diaz; Patricio Heim; Barbara Zemelman; Nicolas Wellmann; Catalina Calcagni
- Directed by: Herval Abreu; Roberto Rebolledo
- Creative director: Paulina Braithwaite
- Starring: Francisca Imboden; Lorena Bosch; María Jose Bello; Josefina Montané
- Opening theme: "Sexy and I Know It" by LMFAO
- Country of origin: Chile
- Original language: Spanish
- No. of seasons: 1
- No. of episodes: 77

Production
- Executive producer: Javier Goldschmied
- Producers: Bernardita Mosso; Alejandra Garate; Tatiana Acevedo
- Production location: Santiago
- Cinematography: Eduardo Alister
- Editors: Douglas Ardiles; Jose Antonio Bustamante
- Camera setup: Single camera
- Running time: 65-120 minutes
- Production company: Canal 13 S.A.

Original release
- Network: Canal 13
- Release: March 17 – July 18, 2013

Related
- Las Bravo (2014); Las Vegas (2016)

Las Vega's is a Chilean television soap opera created by Javier Cuchacovic and Nicolas Wellmann, and starring Francisca Imboden, Lorena Bosch, María Jose Bello, and Josefina Montané. It first aired on Canal 13 from March 17 to July 18, 2013.

== Cast ==
=== Main characters ===
- Francisca Imboden as Verónica Díaz.
- Lorena Bosch as Mariana Vega.
- María José Bello as Antonia Vega.
- Josefina Montané as Camila Vega.

=== Supporting characters ===
Related to Las Vega's club

- Cristián Arriagada as Pedro Vargas
- Cristián Campos as José Luis "Coto" Bravo
- Mario Horton as Vicente Acuña
- Álvaro Gómez as Robinson Martínez
- Ignacio Garmendia as Juan Pablo Vallejos
- Pablo Macaya as Mauro Durán / Ricardo "Richi" Álvarez

Others

- Julio Milostich as Álvaro Sandoval
- Catalina Guerra as Rocío Muñoz
- Claudio Arredondo as Germán Soto
- Katty Kowaleczko as Teresa Acuña
- Héctor Morales as Benjamín Ossandón
- Verónica Soffia as Natalia Silva
- Pablo Schwarz as Boris Vallejos
- Paula Sharim as Magdalena Gutiérrez
- Paulo Brunetti as Javier Riesco
- Antonella Orsini as Lorena Riesco / Lorena Bravo
- Cristóbal Tapia-Montt as Carlitos "Charly" Vega
- Fedra Vergara as Belén Valdebenito
- Martín Castillo as Renzo Zapata

=== Guest appearances ===
- Alejandro Trejo as Carlos Vega
- Ramón Farías as Hernán Aguirre
- Sandra O'Ryan as Fernanda Valdés
- Pablo Ausensi as Vicente's chief
- Verónica González as Luisa
- Noelia Arias as Roxana Olivera
- Felipe Ríos as Saúl
- Eduardo Cumar as trader
- Catalina Olcay as Jéssica Pavez
- Javier Baldassare as Gutiérrez.
- Matias Stevens as Novio.
- Loreto González as Daniela.
- Sebastián Arrigorriaga as Cristián
- Teresa Munchmeyer as Señora Ana
- Agustín Moya as Sr. Acuña
- Edinson Díaz as Rubén / Ramón
- Nathalia Aragonese as Scarlet
- Christian Ocaranza as Alex
- Gabriel Martina as Pibe
- María Eugenia García-Huidobro as Vanessa
- Aldo Parodi as the theater professor
- Mariana Prat as the Kindergarten director
- Luz María Yacometti as the lady of civil registration
- Martín Cárcamo (cameo)
- Tonka Tomicic (cameo)
- Pancho Saavedra (cameo)
- Dominique Gallego (cameo)

== International broadcast ==
- Mexico: XHST-TDT.
- Paraguay: La Tele (2014-2015).
- Peru: Willax.
- South Africa: Star Novela E1.
- Venezuela: Televen (2014).

== International versions ==
- Colombia: Las Vega's (2016).
- Mexico: Las Bravo (2014).
