= Juego de ilusiones =

- Genre: Telenovela
- Created by: Verónica Saquel; Carlos Oporto
- Written by: Marianela Fuenzalida; Fernando Delgado
- Directed by: Matías Stagnaro
- Starring: Julio Milostich; Carolina Arregui
- Opening theme: "Mentira" by Josefina Fiebelkorn
- Country of origin: Chile
- Original language: Spanish
- No. of episodes: 550

Production
- Executive producers: María Eugenia Rencoret; Patricio López
- Production location: Santiago de Chile
- Camera setup: Multi-camera
- Production company: Mazal Producciones

Original release
- Network: Mega
- Release: January 16, 2023 – March 18, 2025

Juego de ilusiones is a Chilean telenovela created by Verónica Saquel and Carlos Oporto for Mega. It aired from January 16, 2023 to March 18, 2025, and stars Julio Milostich and Carolina Arregui. Filming of the telenovela began on 11 October 2022.

== Cast ==
- Carolina Arregui as Mariana Nazir
- Julio Milostich as Julián Mardones / Guillermo Mardones
- Alejandra Fosalba as Victoria Morán
- Loreto Valenzuela as Irene San Juan
- Patricio Achurra as Mario Jiménez
- Magdalena Müller as Sofía Mardones
- Etienne Bobenrieth as Rubén Lara
- Nathalia Aragonese as Susana Mardones
- Felipe Contreras as Ignacio Abascal
- Fernanda Finsterbusch as Javiera Mardones
- Félix Villar as Emmanuel Jiménez
- Nicolás Rojas as Joaquín Mardones
- Mónica Echeverría as Camila Mardones

== Reception ==
=== Ratings ===
| Season | Episodes | First aired | | Last aired | |
| Season | Episodes | Date | Rating (in points) | Date | Rating (in points) |
|---|---|---|---|---|---|
| 1 | 550 | January 16, 2023 | 16.2 | March 18, 2025 | 13.5 |

=== Awards and nominations ===
| Year | Award | Category | Nominated | Result | Ref |
|---|---|---|---|---|---|
| 2023 | Produ Awards | Best Telenovela | Juego de ilusiones | Nominated | |
| 2023 | Produ Awards | Best Lead Actress - Superseries or Telenovela | Carolina Arregui | Nominated | |
| 2025 | Produ Awards | Best Family Telenovela | Juego de ilusiones | Pending | |
| 2025 | Produ Awards | Best Lead Actress - Family Telenovela | Carolina Arregui | Pending | |
| 2025 | Produ Awards | Best Lead Actor - Family Telenovela | Julio Milostich | Pending | |
| 2025 | Produ Awards | Best Directing - Superseries or Telenovela | Matías Stagnaro | Pending | |
| 2025 | Produ Awards | Best Screenplay - Superseries or Telenovela | Verónica Saquel & Carlos Oporto | Pending | |
