= Primera dama (Chilean TV series) =

- Title card
- Created by: Sebastián Arrau
- Directed by: Herval Abreu
- Starring: Celine Reymond; Julio Milostich; Carolina Arregui; Mario Horton; Catalina Guerra; Luciana Echeverría
- Opening theme: ¿Quién eres tú? by Hernán Pelegri
- Ending theme: Bella sin alma by Ricardo Cocciante
- Country of origin: Chile
- Original language: Spanish
- No. of episodes: 127

Production
- Producer: Javier Rubio

Original release
- Network: Canal 13
- Release: August 30, 2010 – March 9, 2011

Related
- Feroz; Mamá mechona; Primera dama (Colombia)

Primera dama (lit: First Lady), is a Chilean television soap opera created by Sebastián Arrau. Starring Celine Reymond, Julio Milostich, Mario Horton, and Catalina Guerra, it aired on Canal 13 from August 30, 2010, to March 9, 2011.

== Cast ==
- Celine Reymond as Sabina Astudillo
- Julio Milostich as Leonardo Santander
- Catalina Guerra as Bruna San Juan
- Mario Horton as Mariano Zamora
- Carolina Arregui as Estrella Soto
- Eduardo Paxeco as Caetano Bello
- Luciana Echeverría as Cristina Santander
- Pablo Schwarz as Domingo Fernández
- César Sepúlveda as Aníbal Urrutia
- Lorena Bosch as Sandra Burr
- Pablo Macaya as Federico Astudillo
- Daniela Lhorente as Paula Méndez
- Nicolás Poblete as Ángel Astudillo
- Javiera Díaz de Valdés as Luciana Cuadra
- Renato Münster as José Astudillo "El Diablo"
- Gabriela Hernández as Mirza Pérez
- Teresita Reyes as Engracia Loyola
- Natalie Dujovne as Emma Astudillo
- Diego Ruiz as Diego Santander
- Elvira Cristi as Rafaela Fonseca
- Teresa Münchmeyer as Hortensia Soto
- María de los Ángeles García as Nancy Ramírez
- Lucy Cominetti as Juanita Ramírez
- Silvana Salgueiro as Corina Molina
- Eyal Meyer as Knut Hassan

== International versions ==
The international rights are distributed by Latin Media Corporation.

Country/language	Local title	Channel	Date aired/premiered
Egypt	السيدة الأولى مسلسل السيدة الاولى السيدة الأولى	Middle East Television	June 29, 2014
Colombia	The First Lady	Caracol Televisión	November 8, 2011
