= León Errázuriz =

Chilean film director

León Errázuriz (born in 1968 in Santiago, Chile) is a filmmaker now based in Los Angeles, USA.

He is earned a degree in Commercial engineering at the Catholic University of Chile 1991, and also studied for a few years at the Centro Universitario de Estudios Cinematográficos of the UNAM Mexican film school. Back in Chile he directed many commercials spots and his first feature film Mala Leche in late 2004, winning the Horizons Award at the 52 San Sebastián International Film Festival.

== Awards ==
- Altazor Awards: Best Director Drama Television with Huaquimán y Tolosa - 2007
- New York LaCinemaFe: Honorable Mention with Mala leche - (35mm,100 minutes) - 2005
- Gramado Film Festival: Nominated with Mala leche - (35mm,100 minutes) -2005
- Festival Cinesul Brasil: Won with Mala leche - (35mm,100 minutes) -2005
- San Sebastián International Film Festival: Won Horizons Awards with Mala leche(35mm,100 minutes)- 2004
- 1999–2003 in two occasions he obtained awards from ACHAP (Chilean National Association of Advertising)

== Filmography as director ==
- 2010 - Letter of Consuelo / a historical TV film about Land Reform in Chile (1971–1973) (Chilevision)
- 2010 - Free Falling Atacama / Feature Film (Director, Script, Edition)
- 2009 - The Goatherd / Feature Film (Director, Script, Edition)
- 2007 - Caméra Café / Director Pilot Chile / Serie TV (4K)
- 2007 - Che Kopete la película/ Feature Film (Director).
- 2006 - Huaiquimán y Tolosa private detectives (Police comedy) / Serie TV (canal 13) (director, original idea)
- 2004 - Mala Leche / Feature Film (Director, script, executive production, editing)

With his production company, Cine FX, he co-produced Paraíso B (2002), Sexo con amor (2003), Jemeaux (2003) y Huaiquimán y Tolosa Investigadores privados / Serie TV (2006).
