= Carlos Pinto (journalist) =

Chilean journalist and television presenter

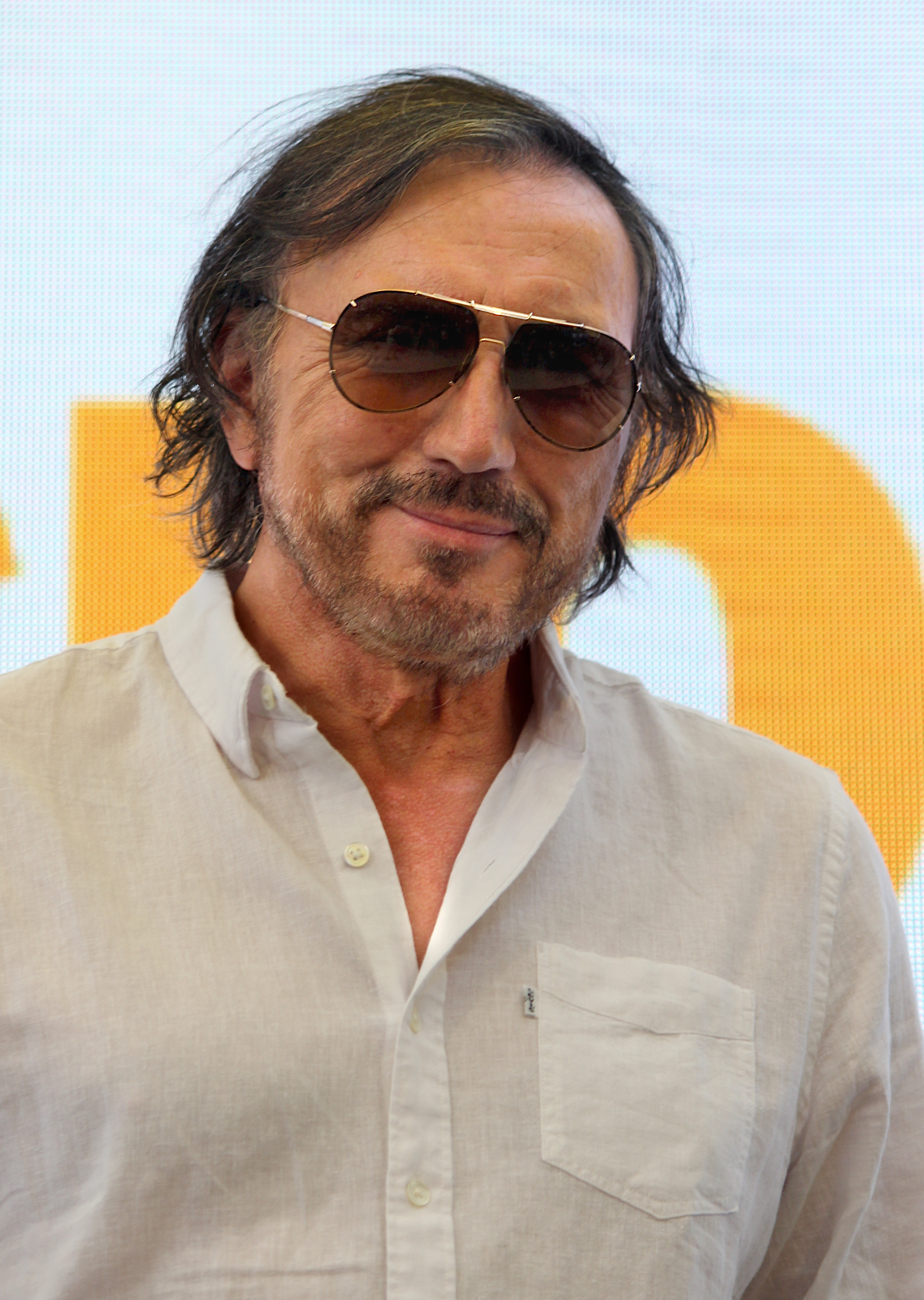
- Carlos Pinto, 2018
- Born: May 12, 1959 (age 66); Santiago de Chile

Carlos Pinto (born May 12, 1959) is a popular Chilean journalist, writer and television presenter. In 1984, he and Santiago Pavlovic began an investigative program called Informe Especial which airs in TVN. He is the father of the football player Sebastián Pinto. It was the driver of the reality The game of fear of TVN, which was taken off the air shortly after due to poor ratings.

In the mid-1990s Carlos Pinto's new program, Mea Culpa, became the most popular true crime shows on Chilean TV history. The show catapulted Pinto's career and today his other shows also have had great success:

- Mea Culpa, true crime movie-like interactments, featuring cases that had its share of spotlight back in the day;
- El Día Menos Pensado ("The Least Expected Day"), it focuses on true paranormal experiences;
- El Cuento del Tío ("Uncle's Tale"), a show that deals with financial deception stories.

Books: "El Silencio de los Malditos" (2018) and "El Jardín de los Inocentes".
