= The Good Life (2008 film) =

- Film poster
- Spanish: La buena vida
- Directed by: Andrés Wood
- Written by: Mamoun Hassan
- Starring: Aline Küppenheim; Manuela Martelli; Eduardo Paxeco; Roberto Farias
- Cinematography: Miguel Littín
- Edited by: Andrea Chignoli
- Music by: Miranda y Tobar
- Release date: August 2008
- Countries: Chile; Argentina; Spain; France; United Kingdom
- Language: Spanish

The Good Life (Spanish: La buena vida) is a 2008 drama film directed by Andrés Wood and written by Mamoun Hassan. The film won the 2008 Goya Award for Best Spanish Language Foreign Film.

== Plot ==
Teresa (Aline Küppenheim), Edmundo (Roberto Farias), Mario (Eduardo Paxeco), and Patricia (Paula Sotelo) are four inhabitants of the city of Santiago de Chile whose lives intersect in public places but rarely come together to communicate.

Immersed in the urban whirlwind, each of them pursues a goal: Teresa, a social psychologist who helps women in situations of risk; Edmundo, a stylist who still lives with his mother and longs to have a car; Mario, a young clarinetist who arrives from Berlin and wants to join the Philharmonic; and Patricia, who struggles to survive while caring for a baby and battling illness.

Four stories based on real events, very different from each other but united by the ups and downs and contradictions of life in a South American city.

== Cast ==
- Aline Küppenheim - Teresa
- Roberto Farías - Edmundo
- Eduardo Paxeco - Mario
- Paula Sotelo - Patricia
- Alfredo Castro - Jorge
- Manuela Martelli - Paula
- Francisco Acuña - Lucas
- Bélgica Castro - Leonor

== Awards and nominations ==
=== Won ===
Goya Awards

- Best Spanish Language Foreign Film

Havana Film Festival

- Mention (Andrés Wood)

Huelva Latin American Film Festival

- Golden Colon: Best Film (Andrés Wood)
