= Loreto Valenzuela =

Chilean actress and director

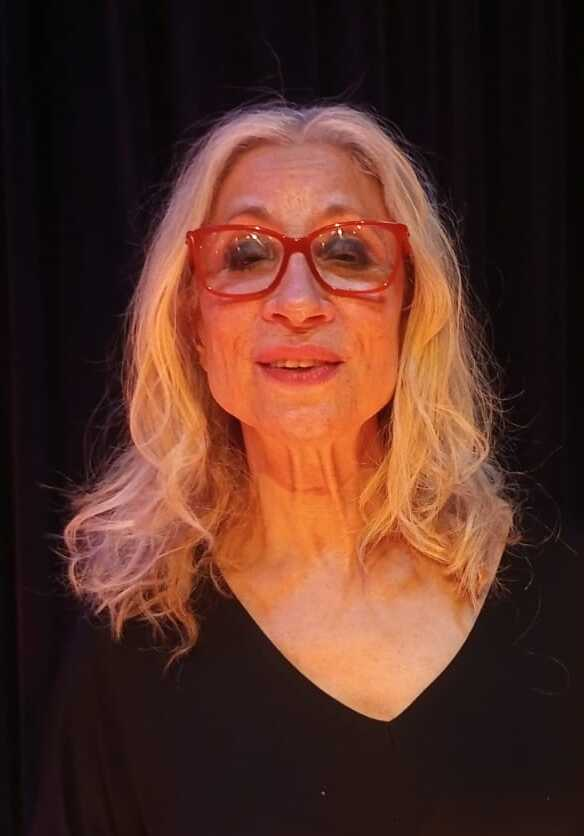
- In 2022
- Born: Loreto Cristina Valenzuela Valdivia; 3 July 1954 (age 72); San Antonio, Chile
- Education: Catholic University of Chile
- Occupations: Actress, theater director
- Spouses: Francisco Huneeus (divorced); Juan Ramón Ibáñez

Loreto Cristina Valenzuela Valdivia (born 3 July 1954) is a Chilean actress and director, recognized for her extensive career in theater and television.

Valenzuela achieved great popularity in the play Tres Marías y una Rosa (1979), in the enigmatic and censored La dama del balcón (1986), in the drama La Quintrala (1987), and for her treacherous antagonistic role in Amanda (2016).

== Biography ==
Loreto Valenzuela studied business engineering at the University of Chile's Faculty of Economy and Business from 1972 to 1973 due to political considerations. After the 1973 military coup, a continuous persecution against leftist students began. The school was dissolved the same year, so she was forced to abandon her studies. Subsequently, she took secretarial and acting courses at the School of Communication Arts (EAC) of the Pontifical Catholic University, graduating in 1979.

In 1979 she starred with Luz Jiménez, Myriam Palacios, and Soledad Alonso in the play Tres Marías y una Rosa by David Benavente and directed by Raúl Osorio. Its success led her to tour Latin America and Europe. In the theater, she has excelled in the productions Three Sisters by Chekhov, El día que me quieras by José Ignacio Cabrujas, Invitación a cenar by Egon Wolff, and a theatrical adaptation of Dona Flor and Her Two Husbands by Jorge Amado, in addition to several plays with the outstanding Ictus Theater company, such as Sueños de mala muerte and Oleada.

After participating in plays, Valenzuela made her television debut in 1984 with La represa on TVN, produced by Sonia Fuchs. In the telenovela she played a small but fundamental role, sharing a scene with Malú Gatica, Luz Jiménez, and Alfredo Castro.

In 1986, she obtained her first leading role, in María Elena Gertner's enigmatic La dama del balcón. Valenzuela plays three characters and earned the recognition of TV critics. The character suffers a Nazi genetic experiment that keeps her young. However, the telenovela was censored by the military regime of Augusto Pinochet. Later, she participated in Vicente Sabatini's successful miniseries La Quintrala (1987), playing Rufina, a sorceress slave. In this production, she shared credits with Raquel Argandoña, Roxana Campos, and María Izquierdo. At the same time, she made her cinematic debut with the 1986 film Hechos consumados, followed by Consuelo in 1989.

In 2000 she returned to TVN after making special appearances on some shows. This time she participated in several productions, such as Santo ladrón, the successful Amores de mercado (2001), and the young adult telenovela 16 (2003). Later she moved to the station Canal 13 to participate in successful productions such as Brujas and Lola.

In 2016 she obtained her first antagonistic role in Amanda, playing Catalina Minardi, a rigid and narcissistic matriarch who suffers from a facial paralysis, owner of the estate where the protagonist returns for revenge. The character has been ranked as one of the actress's best performances, both in terms of aesthetics and idioms.

Valenzuela plays an important social role together with the CoArtRe Corporation, which works on the reintegration of Chilean prisoners into the labor market.

== Filmography ==
=== Film ===
Year	Title	Role	Director
1983	El 18 de los García		Claudio di Girolamo
1983	Rogelio Segundo		Ricardo Larraín
1988	Hechos consumados	Marta	Luis R. Vera
1988	Consuelo	Consuelo	Luis R. Vera
1990	The Moon in the Mirror		Silvio Caiozzi
1994	The Shipwrecked	Leticia	Miguel Littín
2001	Te amo (made in Chile)	Madre de Samuel	Sergio Castilla
2003	Sex with Love	Mónica	Boris Quercia
2003	El huésped	Doctora Solar	Coke Hidalgo

=== Telenovelas ===
Year	Title	Role	Channel
1984	La represa	Hortencia "Tencha" Jara	TVN
1986	La dama del balcón	Nora de Castaños / Regina Rey / Olga	TVN
1987	La Quintrala	Rufina	TVN
2000	Santo ladrón	Norma Villegas	TVN
2001	Amores de mercado	Maitén García "La Morocha"	TVN
2003	16	Mariana del Canto	TVN
2005	Brujas	Mercedes Salazar	Canal 13
2006	Descarado	Minerva Castillo	Canal 13
2007-2008	Lola	Alicia Toro	Canal 13
2011	Aquí mando yo	Carmen Morales	TVN
2013	Dos por uno	Isidora Goycochea	TVN
2014	El amor lo manejo yo	Isabel Fuentes	TVN
2015	Eres mi tesoro	Gabriela Aldunate	Mega
2016-2017	Amanda	Catalina Minardi	Mega
2018	Educando a Nina		Chilevisión
2026	La baronesa	Aurora Valdés	Mega

=== TV series and specials ===
Year	Title	Role	Channel
1998	Los Cárcamo	Josefa Machuca	Canal 13
2005	La Nany	Mónica	Mega
2005	Los simuladores	Madre de Macarena	Canal 13
2008	El blog de la Feña	Miss Maturana	Canal 13

== Theater ==
- Tres Marías y una Rosa
- Three Sisters
- El día en que me quieras
- Invitación a cenar
- Dona Flor and Her Two Husbands
- Debajo de las polleras (2004)
- Brujas (2009)
- The House of the Spirits (2010)

== Awards and nominations ==
=== Caleuche Awards ===
Year	Category	Work	Result
2018	Best Leading Television Actress	Amanda	Winner

=== Copihue de Oro ===
Year	Category	Work	Result
2017	Best Popular Actress	Amanda	Nominated
2017	Copihue de Oro Queen		Nominated

=== FOTECH Award ===
Year	Category	Work	Result
2017	Best Supporting Actress	Amanda	Nominated
2017	The 7 Best Characters of the Year	Amanda	Winner

=== Wikén-GfK Adimark Poll ===
Year	Category	Work	Place
2017	Best Television Actress	Amanda	4th (59 points)
