= Roberto Farías =

Chilean actor

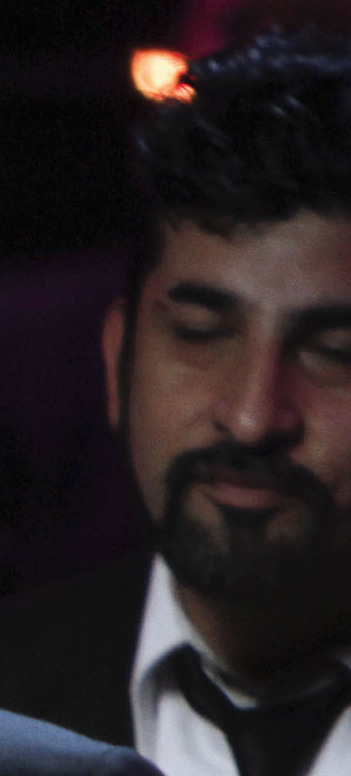
- Born: 31 May 1969 (age 57); Conchalí, Chile
- Occupation: Actor
- Years active: 2003-present

Roberto Farías Morales (born 31 May 1969) is a Chilean actor. He has appeared in more than thirty films since 2003. He also works in dubbing.

== Career ==
He studied in various acting workshops, including the María Cánepa Corporation Workshop and the Juan Edmundo González Workshop. In 1997, he graduated from Theater School. He started out in street theater at the age of 25 and has been under the direction of important Chilean directors, such as Gustavo Meza, Raúl Osorio, Luis Ureta, Alexis Moreno and Guillermo Calderón.

== Selected filmography ==
Year	Title	Role	Notes
2007	Life Kills Me (La vida me mata)	Coach	
2008	The Good Life (La Buena Vida)	Edmundo	
2012	Violeta Went to Heaven (Violeta se fue a los cielos)	Luis Arce	
2012	My Last Round (Mi Último Round)	Octavio	
2012–2014	El Reemplazante	Francisco	
2015	The Club (El Club)	Sandokan	
2020	Jailbreak Pact (Pacto de fuga)	Rafael Jiménez	
