= Héroes (Chilean miniseries) =

- Héroes promotional photo
- Directed by: Cristián Galaz; Gustavo Graef-Marino; Ricardo Larraín; Rodrigo Sepúlveda
- Starring: Julio Milostich; Diego Casanueva; Benjamín Vicuña; Carlos Concha; Jaime McMannus; Andrés Waas
- Country of origin: Chile
- No. of episodes: 6

Original release
- Network: Canal 13 (Chile)
- Release: March 25, 2007 – May 31, 2009

Héroes (full name: Héroes, la gloria tiene su precio, "Heroes, glory has its price" in Spanish) is a Chilean TV miniseries produced by Canal 13 in 2007.

Héroes has 6 episodes. Each one of them relates the history of one of the principal figures of the Chilean history in the 19th century: Bernardo O'Higgins, José Miguel Carrera, Manuel Rodríguez, Diego Portales, José Manuel Balmaceda and Arturo Prat. The miniseries is one of the most ambitious project of Canal 13 for the commemoration of the bicentenary of the independence of Chile, in 2010.

The miniseries has the support of the Ministry of Education and the Chilean Army.

== Episodes ==
=== "O'Higgins, vivir para merecer su nombre" ===
"O'Higgins, Live to Deserve his Name"
Hero: Bernardo O'Higgins
Released: March 26, 2007

The film is set during 1817 to 1823, on the events of the Patria Nueva, but it has some flashbacks when O'Higgins was a kid (years unrevealed) and when he was learning who his father (Ambrosio O'Higgins) was. Its main plot surrounds the events of his governments, and the changes on his popularity among the people.

In this film, Bernardo O'Higgins is portrayed by the actor Julio Milostich, and gives an "emotional" side to the hero, to explain why he acceded to kill the Carrera brothers and Manuel Rodriguez.

Other co-stars are Daniela Jaccques as Rosario Puga, Elsa Poblete as Isabel Riquelme, Hector Noguera as Ambrosio O'Higgins, Diego Muñoz as José Antonio Pérez Cotapos, Pedro Vicuña as General De La Cruz, Daniel Muñoz as José de San Martín, and Benjamín Vicuña as Manuel Rodríguez.

=== "Carrera, el príncipe de los caminos" ===
Carrera, the Prince of the Roads
Hero: José Miguel Carrera
Released: April 30, 2007

The film is set during 1796 (just a brief scene in which Carrera is a young boy) to 1821. When José Miguel is having his worst moments, he remembers a memory from his youth: a scorpion trying to escape from fire. Its main plot surrounds Carrera's journey back to Chile and the revenge he has for O'Higgins. Here, José Miguel Carrera is portrayed by a new young actor, Diego Casanueva.

Other co-stars are Javiera Díaz de Valdés as Mercedes Fontecilla, Sebastián Layseca as José María Benavente, Daniel Muñoz as José de San Martín, Benjamín Vicuña as Manuel Rodríguez, Julio Milostich as Bernardo O´Higgins, Alfredo Allende as Luis Carrera, and Gabriel Sepúlveda as Juan José Carrera.

=== "Rodríguez, hijo de la rebeldía" ===
"Rodriguez, Son of the Rebelliousness"
Hero: Manuel Rodríguez
Released: June 24, 2007

The film is set during 1808 to 1818, especially highlighting the period of the Reconquista and having as its main plot surrounding Rodriguez's time as a spy. Additionally, the film is narrated by Rodriguez's father, Carlos Rodriguez.

This is the third film and the final one of the independency trilogy. Manuel Rodriguez is portrayed by Benjamín Vicuña, and though it is the third time he appears in an Héroes film, now he has a much larger role.

Other co-stars are María Elena Swett as Francisca de Paula Segura y Ruiz, Alejandro Trejo as Carlos Rodriguez, Carmen Disa Gutiérrez as Loreto Erdoíza, Erto Pantoja as Miguel Neira, Mariana Loyola as Ana, Julio Milostich as Bernardo O'Higgins and Diego Casanueva as José Miguel Carrera.

=== "Portales, la fuerza de los hechos" ===
"Portales, the force of the Facts"
Hero: Diego Portales
Released: September 2, 2007

The film is set only in 1837, when Diego Portales is arrested along with Necochea. Throughout the movie, there are several flashbacks showing Portales's father's arrest, his relationship with his mother, the deaths of his wife and daughters, and his rise to power. Another theme in the movie is religion and the tendency that Portales has to always blame God for the deaths of his loved ones.

Diego Portales here is portrayed by the actor Carlos Concha, who perfectly reflects both of the hero's sides. He portrays his kind side when he is joking with Necochea or with his family. And his more ruthless side is when his family is already dead.

Other co-stars are Luis Gnecco as Necochea, Paola Giannini as Chepita, Paulina García as María Encarnación, Ingrid Isenee as Constanza, Marcial Edwards as José Portales, Pablo Schwarz as Santiago Florín and Pablo Krögh as Viadurre.

=== "Balmaceda" ===
Hero: José Manuel Balmaceda
Released: September 30, 2007

The only film to feature a President of Chile, and the Chilean Civil War of 1891.

=== "Prat, Espada de honor" ===
"Prat, sword of honor"
Hero: Arturo Prat
Released: May 24 and 31, 2009

Released in honor of the 130th anniversary of the Battle of Iquique that made him Chile's great national naval hero of the War of the Pacific (thus making it also the only episode from this great and important part of the nation's history). Even through it was made very late in 2008, this two-part film focuses on Arturo Prat's life and the battle that made him a hero for the nation, at his life's cost. Andres Waas stars as the Chilean naval hero.
