= Álvaro Gómez (actor) =

Chilean actor and theatre director (born 1980)

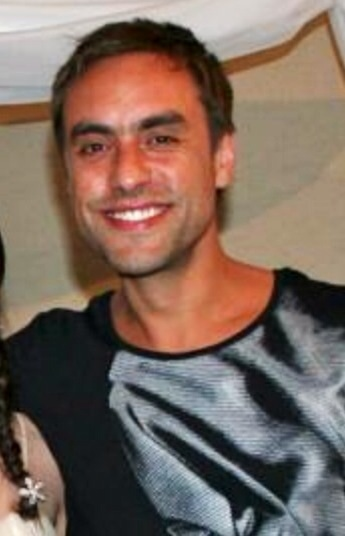
- Born: Álvaro Gómez González; 24 December 1980 (age 44); Osorno, Chile
- Occupations: Actor; theatre director
- Partner(s): Francini Amaral (2010–2015); Florencia Arenas (2019–present)

Álvaro Gómez González (born 24 December 1980) is a Chilean actor and theatre director.

== Personal life ==
Gómez was in a relationship with dancer Francini Amaral from 2010 to 2015. As of 2019, he is engaged to artist Florencia Arenas.

== Filmography ==
=== Movies ===
Year	Title	Role	Director
2011	Baby Shower	Julio	Pablo Illanes

=== Television ===
==== Telenovelas ====
Year	Title	Role	Network
2007	Vivir con 10	Silvestre Solé	Chilevisión
2008	Mala conducta	Rigoberto "Rigo" Bobadilla	Chilevisión
2009	Sin anestesia	Zaror Cruchaga	Chilevisión
2010	Martín Rivas	Clemente Valencia	TVN
2011	Témpano	Luciano Estévez	TVN
2013	Las Vega's	Robinson Martínez	Canal 13
2018	Si yo fuera rico	Facundo Grandinetti	MEGA
2021	La torre de Mabel	Carlos Ortega / Juan Pablo Arismendi	Canal 13
2024	Secretos de familia	Dr. Gerardo Cruchaga Echeverría	Canal 13

==== TV Series ====
Year	Title	Role	Channel
2008	Huaiquimán y Tolosa	Látigo	Canal 13
2010	Cartas de Mujer		Chilevisión
2012	Infieles	Nino / Manuel	Chilevisión

== Theatre ==
Year	Title	Role	Director
2012	El Muro	El Tila	Himself

== Sources ==
- Álvaro Gómez at IMDb
