= El Día Menos Pensado =

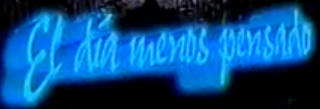
- Title card
- Genre: Supernatural horror; Thriller; Mystery; Drama
- Created by: Carlos Pinto
- Directed by: Carlos Pinto; Jaime Canales; Marcelo Bernous
- Narrated by: Carlos Pinto (host)
- Theme music composer: Sergio Ruiz de Gamboa
- Opening theme: El Día Menos Pensado Theme Song (Cortina de Mea Culpa)
- Country of origin: Chile
- Original language: Spanish
- No. of seasons: 13
- No. of episodes: 118

Production
- Production location: Chile (many places)
- Camera setup: Multi-camera
- Production company: Geoimagen

Original release
- Network: TVN Chile
- Release: 1999 – 2011

El Día Menos Pensado (Spanish for The Least Expected Day) is a Chilean television program broadcast on the screens of Televisión Nacional de Chile, directed by journalist Carlos Pinto, under the Chilean producer Geoimagen. The series recreates stories based on real life that do not have a scientific explanation and are attributed to paranormal events, two-dimensional encounters and life after death. The main music of the program was composed by Sergio Ruiz de Gamboa. The first season was broadcast in 1999 and the last during 2011. The series was broadcast again in 2020, on Fridays at 1:30 pm and Saturdays at 1 pm (Chilean time).

== Cast ==
The cast of the series was very varied in its nearly 12 years of broadcast, with the following actors appearing in at least 3 episodes.

- Loreto Moya
- Pedro Vicuña
