= Mea Culpa (Chilean TV series) =

- Genre: Police procedural; Criminology; Mystery; Drama; Thriller; True crime
- Created by: Carlos Pinto
- Directed by: Carlos Pinto; Jaime Canales; Marcelo Bernous
- Narrated by: Carlos Pinto (host) (seasons 1–13); Cecilia Serrano (host) (season 1)
- Theme music composer: Edgardo Riquelme
- Opening theme: Mea Culpa Theme Song (Cortina de Mea Culpa)
- Country of origin: Chile
- Original language: Spanish
- No. of seasons: 14
- No. of episodes: 152

Production
- Production location: Chile (many places)
- Camera setup: Multi-camera
- Production companies: International Network Group (stage 1); Nuevo Espacio (stage 2); Producciones Geoimagen (stage 3)

Original release
- Network: TVN Chile
- Release: June 2, 1993 – present

Mea culpa is a Chilean television series broadcast by Televisión Nacional de Chile in prime time, hosted by journalist Carlos Pinto. He recreates with actors the crimes that have shocked Chilean public opinion in a trustworthy way, which, in its original broadcasts, earned him a large audience in his country of origin. Its first broadcast was on June 2, 1993, presented by journalist Cecilia Serrano. The main music at the beginning of the program was composed by Edgardo Riquelme in 1993 who also composed certain themes used as incidental music in some chapters.

Given its graphic dramatization of murders, rapes or other crimes that endanger human life, this series is exclusively for adults.

After twelve years of the last episode issued, on October 21, 2021 a new season premiered, replicating the success of its broadcasts in the 90s and 2000s. The new episodes of 2021 have been promoted as 'Mea Culpa: El Regreso' (Mea Culpa returns, in Spanish).

== History ==
At the beginning the program was presented by the journalist Cecilia Serrano, recognized for being a host, at that time the main TVN newscast, with an introduction to the case, then she continued with the recreation of the case, a case with different themes each week. At the end, the psychologist Giorgio Agostini Vicentini and the criminologist lawyer Andrés Domínguez Vial were discussed about the case, as well as a guest depending on the case. In the following seasons it changed and only the recreations were presented and within these, an expert in the subject was consulted.

During its broadcast, it beat the ratings of its competitor's programs in its schedule. At first they were broadcast on Wednesdays, and then it surpassed Martes 13 of Canal 13, between 1993 and 1995. Although the program during its broadcast varied on its broadcast day, its schedule was maintained, always surpassing other programs.

Between 2000 and March 2003 there were no new chapters and they only gave replays after midnight. In April 2003, a new season returns after four years of recess and he beat Canal 13's first Vértigo season on Thursdays at 10:00 pm. Then in 2004 another season returns for Monday and beats Morandé con Compañía de Mega. Between 2005 and 2008 there were five seasons in a row one each year.

While the show was never officially canceled, and a final episode was unnecessary, being an episodic series, its last season is considered to have aired between 2008 and 2009. A series of similar themes was broadcast several years later, this time on Canal 13, called Irreversible, which was almost the same, although without the interviewers to the real culprits.

As of July 11, 2017, TVN uploaded the entire series to YouTube, where all 150 episodes are currently available for viewing.

In 2020, during COVID-19 pandemic, as part of the special programming of TVN, this program began to be broadcast randomly at midnight on Saturday, again having great success with viewers.

== Cast ==
The cast of the series was very varied in its nearly 16 years of broadcast, with the following actors appearing in at least 5 episodes.

- Patricio Andrade (7 episodes: 2003.2008)
- Maité Fernández (5 episodes: 2004–2008)
- María Teresa Palma (5 episodes: 2003–2008)
- Raúl Roco (5 episodes: 1995–2007)

== Episodes ==
=== Season 1 (1994) ===
- 1. Cita con el Amor
- 2. Presunta Desgracia
- 3. La Berenice
- 4. Fue una Pasión
- 5. La Llamada Fatal
- 6. Por mi Hijo
- 7. Volver a Nacer
- 8. Yo Acuso
- 9. Adiós a los Sueños
- 10. La Visita
- 11. Dios Existe
- 12. La Bodega

=== Season 2 (1994) ===
- 1. El Exorcismo
- 2. El Amor de Marjory y Alexander
- 3. La Gran Estafa a Las Isapres
- 4. Erase una vez una Madre
- 5. El Silencio de los Culpables
- 6. El Último Adiós
- 7. Entre el Amor y los Sueños (Part 1)
- 8. Entre el Amor y los Sueños (Part 2)
- 9. El Resplandor
- 10. Escape de la Muerte
- 11. El Desencuentro
- 12. El Límite

=== Season 3 (1995) ===
- 1. El Silencio de los Culpables
- 2. El Penoso Camino de la Violencia
- 3. El paredón del desierto (Part 1)
- 4. El paredón del desierto (Part 2)
- 5. Es Tiempo de Vivir
- 6. El Camino Sin Regreso
- 7. El Corazón en tus Manos
- 8. El Terrorista I parte
- 9. El Terrorista II parte
- 10. El Toro de Quilamuta
- 11. El Encuentro Final
- 12. El protagonista (Johnny Cien Pesos)

=== Season 4 (1996) ===
- 1. Era un Martes 13
- 2. El Asaltante Solitario
- 3. El Sueño Inconcluso (El Extranjero)
- 4. En Nombre del Amor
- 5. El Charro Dorotea
- 6. El Desconocido
- 7. Era Solo una Niña
- 8. El Viernes Negro
- 9. Entre el Miedo y el Dolor
- 10. El Regalo
- 11. El Día Inolvidable

=== Season 5 (1997) ===
- 1. El Embrujo de Salamanca
- 2. El Eterno Castigo
- 3. El Pasado
- 4. En Un Pueblo del Sur
- 5. El Último Grito
- 6. El Honor De La Familia
- 7. El Padre
- 8. El Doctor
- 9. El Sepulturero
- 10. El Estudiante
- 11. El Amante
- 12. El Enfermo
- 13. El Exorcismo

=== Season 6 (1998) ===
- 1. El Forastero de la Muerte
- 2. El Día de la Crisis
- 3. El Sueño Roto
- 4. El Elegido
- 5. El Niño Jesús
- 6. El Dolor de la Inocencia
- 7. El Maldito Placer
- 8. El Incidente
- 9. El Verdugo de la Inocencia
- 10. El Profesor
- 11. Eran Las Diez

=== Season 7 (1999) ===
- 1. El Crimen Perfecto
- 2. El Cautiverio
- 3. El Padrastro
- 4. El Rubencito
- 5. El Desprecio
- 6. El Hermano
- 7. El Abandono
- 8. El Ladrón
- 9. El Viaje
- 10. El Engaño
- 11. El Robo

=== Season 8 (2003) ===
- 1. El Proceso
- 2. El Tucho Caldera
- 3. El Incidente
- 4. El Joya
- 5. El Veneno
- 6. El Sádico
- 7. El Cementerio de Dardignac
- 8. El Incendio
- 9. El Canciller
- 10. El Taxi (Part 1)
- 11. El Taxi (Part 2)
- 12. El Padre

=== Season 9 (2004) ===
- 1. El Mercenario
- 2. El Amor Imposible
- 3. El Castigo
- 4. El Visitante
- 5. El Heredero
- 6. Entre Cuatro Paredes
- 7. El Pirómano
- 8. El Diagnóstico
- 9. El Arrebato
- 10. El Testimonio
- 11. El Mano de Tijeras

=== Season 10 (2005) ===
- 1. El Croata
- 2. El Portal Lyon
- 3. El Cuatrero
- 4. El Analfabeto
- 5. El Encargo
- 6. El Cuidador
- 7. Emilio
- 8. El Tambor
- 9. El Doctor Amor
- 10. El Bosque
- 11. El Adiós
- 12. El Pediatra

=== Season 11 (2006) ===
- 1. El Alex
- 2. Esos Niños (Part 1)
- 3. Esos Niños (Part 2)
- 4. El Único Camino
- 5. El Nono y la Pola
- 6. El Amante
- 7. El Psicópata de Pozo Almonte
- 8. El Sicario
- 9. El Inculpado
- 10. Ella empezó a los trece años
- 11. El Séptimo Piso
- 12. El Enfrentamiento
- 13. El Guardia

=== Season 12 (2007) ===
- 1. El Canero
- 2. El Sacerdote
- 3. El Colectivo
- 4. El Vengador
- 5. El Descontrol
- 6. El Amor Justiciero
- 7. El Policía
- 8. El Cumpleaños
- 9. Tito Van Damme
- 10. El Agobio
- 11. El Despedido
- 12. El Cuidador

=== Season 13 (2008) ===
- 1. El Guardia
- 2. El Hijo Pródigo
- 3. El Niño Problema
- 4. El Crimen Imperfecto
- 5. El Vengador
- 6. En el nombre del Padre
- 7. El Internado (Part 1)
- 8. El Internado (Part 2)
- 9. En Manos de Dios
- 10. El Amigo Íntimo
- 11. El Amor de Madre
- 12. El Manipulador
- 13. El Embaucador
- 14. El Desaparecido
- 15. Ella Tenía 10 Meses
- 16. El Lado Oscuro del Sexo
- 17. El Taxi de Alto Hospicio

=== Season 14 (2021) ===
- 1. Un cuento salvaje
- 2. El Chacal de Puerto Montt
- 3. Adiós al cariño
- 4. El brujo
- 5. El plan imperfecto
- 6. El alma sucia
- 7. A la sombra del padre
