= Iorana =

1998 Chilean telenovela

- Genre: Telenovela
- Created by: Enrique Cintolesi
- Written by: Fernando Aragón; Arnaldo Madrid; Hugo Morales; Nona Fernández
- Directed by: Vicente Sabatini; Rodrigo Sepúlveda
- Creative director: Carlos Leppe
- Starring: Claudia Di Girolamo; Francisco Reyes; Álvaro Morales; Alejandra Fosalba; Carolina Fadic; Alfredo Castro; Juan Falcón etc.
- Theme music composer: Eduardo Garrido
- Opening theme: "E Nua e Koro"
- Country of origin: Chile
- Original languages: Spanish; Rapanui
- No. of episodes: 103

Production
- Executive producer: Vicente Sabatini
- Producers: Pablo Ávila; Marcelo Muñoz
- Production locations: Easter Island, Chile
- Cinematography: Multi-camera
- Editors: Miguel Garrido; Jaime Pagani
- Running time: Approx. 45 minutes
- Production company: Televisión Nacional de Chile

Original release
- Network: Televisión Nacional de Chile; TV Chile
- Release: 9 March – 31 July 1998

Related
- Tic Tac (preceded); Borrón y cuenta nueva (followed)

Iorana is a Chilean telenovela in the romantic drama genre, directed by Vicente Sabatini. It aired on the public broadcaster Televisión Nacional de Chile from March 9 to July 31, 1998.

The series stars Claudia Di Girolamo, Francisco Reyes, Álvaro Morales, and Alejandra Fosalba. It also features Carolina Fadic, Alfredo Castro, and Juan Falcón in antagonist roles. The supporting cast includes Delfina Guzmán, Eduardo Barril, José Soza, Consuelo Holzapfel, Viviana Rodríguez, Claudia Burr, Pablo Schwarz, Tamara Acosta, Felipe Braun, Amparo Noguera, Sergio Hernández, Carmen Disa Gutiérrez, Francisco Melo, Francisca Imboden, among others.

Iorana became the thirteenth most-watched telenovela in Chilean television history and the ninth most successful production of Televisión Nacional, according to Time Ibope ratings. Throughout its run, it averaged 30.2 rating points, with some episodes reaching peaks of up to 60 points. During its time slot, it surpassed competing programs such as Amándote from Canal 13 and A todo dar from Megavisión. The series was awarded the Premio APES for Best Production, and Alfredo Castro won Best Actor for his outstanding performance.

== Plot ==
Cristián Balbontín (Álvaro Morales) is deeply in love with the beautiful Rapa Nui woman Vaitea Haoa (Alejandra Fosalba), and they have decided to get married. However, their relationship is hindered by various external interests rooted in a dark past. Central to the conflict is the return of Fernando Balbontín (Francisco Reyes), Cristián's father, who left Easter Island 15 years earlier after being falsely accused of setting fire to the Rapa Nui Archaeological Museum, destroying priceless artifacts.

Fernando's return in a fragile health state shakes the island community. His wife, Josefa Soublette (Claudia Di Girolamo), who believed him dead, remarried Luciano Cox (Alfredo Castro), a greedy and unscrupulous man who was actually responsible for the crime that haunted the Balbontín family. Fernando comes back with two purposes: to seek revenge on Josefa and Luciano for their betrayals and to regain the love and loyalty of his children, who have been caught between indifference towards him and loyalty to their mother.

Fernando's approach to revenge is unique and surprising; he presents himself as a man on the brink of death, isolated within a protective bubble separating him from the outside world. He is guarded by Arístides Concha, his private physician, a character also played by Fernando himself, adding mystery around his condition. Additionally, Fernando introduces Captain Antoine Dumond, a Frenchman who arrives on the island claiming to be the executor of Fernando's estate, accompanying him in his final days.

Cristián, Fernando's eldest son, is a skilled diver on the island but also deeply connected to the local culture, having adopted the customs and identity of Rapa Nui to the extent he considers himself a true islander. He calls himself “Iriti” and lives in seclusion in a cave by the rocks of Ovahe Beach, a paradise refuge he chose after leaving Josefa's home following her marriage to Luciano.

Cristián's life changes unexpectedly when he meets Paula Novoa (Carolina Fadic), an ambitious and captivating journalist who arrives on Rapa Nui searching for the submerged Moai, a legendary statue that has captured the interest of adventurers. Paula is not only pursuing fame and prestige but also becomes romantically involved with Iriti, complicating his feelings and his engagement to Vaitea. Their relationship introduces conflicts, distrust, and controversies that affect the islanders. Paula's quest for professional relevance triggers a chain of events leading to the dishonor of the island and reigniting old rivalries, threatening not only personal reputations but the harmony of the Rapa Nui community.

As the characters navigate betrayals, passions, secrets, and complex family relationships, the story unfolds into a tangled plot where revenge, love, and the fight for identity drive each character's decisions, ultimately altering everyone's fate.

== Cast ==
The cast directed by Vicente Sabatini includes:

- Claudia Di Girolamo as Josefa Soublette
- Francisco Reyes as Fernando Balbontín / Arístides Concha / Antoine Dumond
- Alfredo Castro as Luciano Cox
- Álvaro Morales as Cristián "Iriti" Balbontín
- Alejandra Fosalba as Vaitea Haoa
- Carolina Fadic as Paula Novoa
- Juan Falcón as Siu Teao
- Viviana Rodríguez as Francisca Labbé
- Eduardo Barril as Gregorio Peñailillo
- Delfina Guzmán as Virginia Sanz
- José Soza as Rodolfo Tuki
- Claudia Burr as Teresa Apablaza
- Tamara Acosta as Tahía Peñailillo
- Pablo Schwarz as Andrés Maturana
- Francisca Imboden as Susana Peñailillo
- Felipe Braun as Rafael Balbontín
- Amparo Noguera as Ingrid Astudillo
- Francisco Melo as Ismael Nahoe
- Consuelo Holzapfel as Angélica Riroroko
- Sergio Hernández as Mike Haoa
- Mariel Bravo as Cristina Tuki
- Óscar Hernández as Lázaro Tepano
- Carmen Disa Gutiérrez as Dolores Miru
- Roxana Campos as Carmen Abarca
- Hugo Medina as Hotu Pakarati
- Ana Luz Figueroa as Isadora Haoa
- Nicolás Fontaine as Alan Carter
- Lorene Prieto as Isabel Tepu
- Erto Pantoja as Petero Pakarati
- Antonia Zegers as Margaret Olivares
- Néstor Cantillana as Patricio Tepano
- Blanca Lewin as Tiare Tepano
- Nicolás Saavedra as Ariki Foltmann
- Mireya Véliz as Nua Eva Huke
- José Martín as Walter Puga

== Production ==
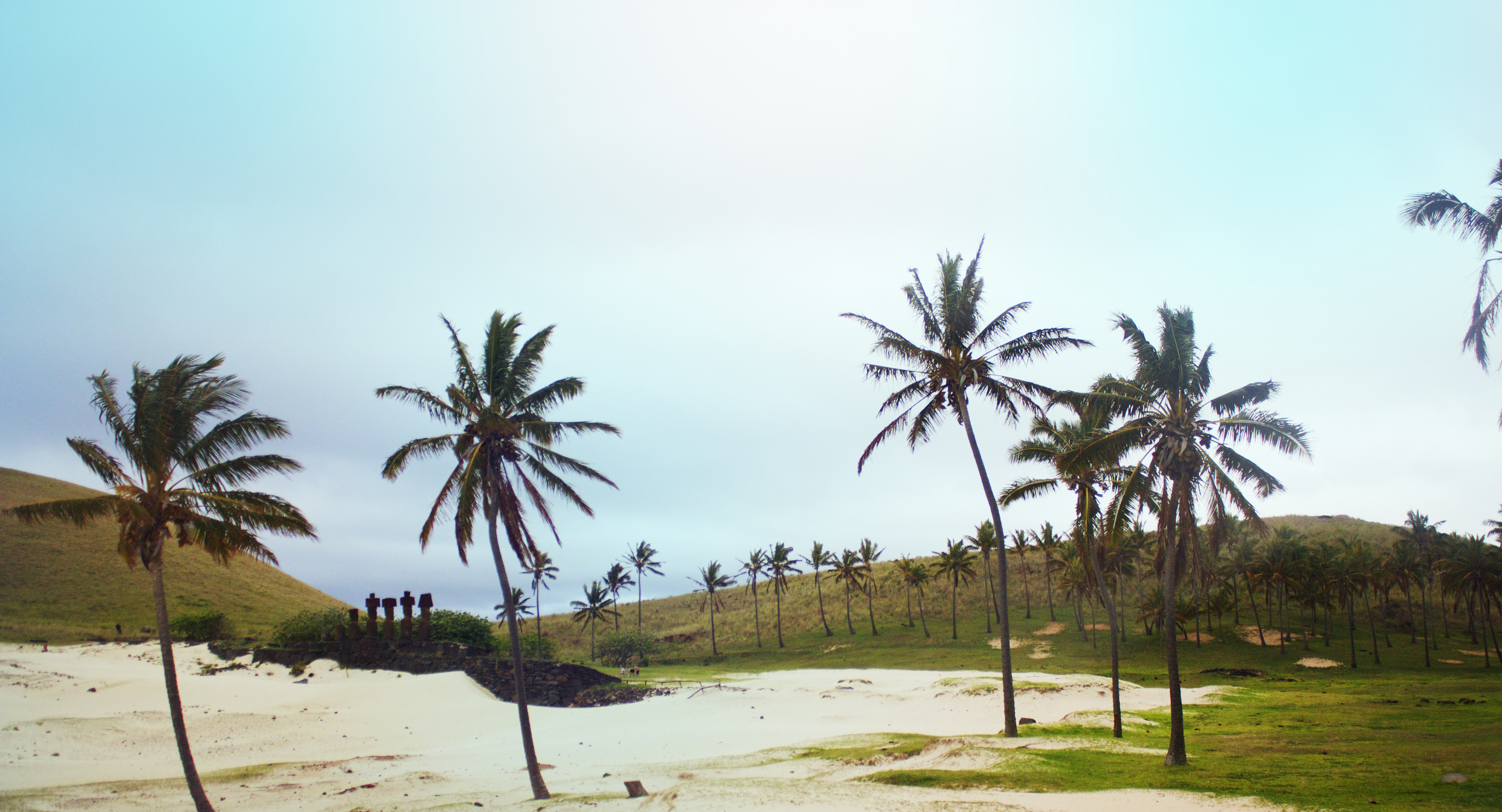
The beach of Anakena was widely used for filming scenes of the production.

Filming took place on Easter Island and around Anakena Beach from December 1997 to May 1998. The series features a bilingual script mixing Rapanui language (the native language of Easter Island) and Spanish. The title Iorana is a greeting in Rapanui meaning "welcome."

The production initially offered the role of Vaitea Haoa to Leonor Varela, who declined to continue her acting commitments in France.

== Reception ==
Iorana achieved high ratings throughout its broadcast and was widely praised for showcasing the culture, traditions, and landscapes of Rapa Nui. Critics noted its bold narrative structure, use of local languages, and the strong performances of its cast, especially Francisco Reyes and Alfredo Castro.
