= Impatient =

Impatient may refer to:

- "Impatient" (Anna Abreu song)
- "Impatient" (Jeremih song)
- "Impatient", a 2024 song by Ansonbean
- "Impatient", a song by Blu Cantrell from the album Bittersweet

== See also ==
- Impatiens, a genus of flowers
- (Im)Patient, a 2021 Chilean film
- Inpatient
