= Violeta Vidaurre =

Chilean actress (1928–2021)

- Born: Violeta Rosa Ester Vidaurre Heiremans; 12 September 1928; Traiguén, Chile
- Died: 1 June 2021 (aged 92)
- Education: Pontifical Catholic University of Chile
- Occupation: Actress
- Years active: 1959–2016
- Spouses: Ramón Salgado (1946–1973); Pedro Villagra (1976–2021)
- Awards: APES Award for artistic career (2011); Enrique Silva Cimma Award (2015)

Violeta Rosa Ester Vidaurre Heiremans (12 September 1928 – 1 June 2021), better known as Violeta Vidaurre, was a Chilean actress with a long television and theater career, with more than 120 characters played since her debut.

For three decades, Vidaurre established herself as one of the most important theater actresses in the cast of the Catholic University's Experimental Theater, collaborating with Eugenio Dittborn, Eugenio Guzmán, Hugo Miller, Víctor Jara, and the American Frank McMullan. In 1963, she was summoned to play Laura Larraín in La pérgola de las flores by Isidora Aguirre, replacing Silvia Piñeiro, which quickly became a pop culture sensation. She achieved success in television with the comedy Juntos se pasa mejor in 1965, in the family comedy Juani en Sociedad (broadcast from 1967 to 1972), and in the first television adaptation of Martín Rivas in 1970. After the dictatorship she began to work in various university productions and independent companies. She made her way back onto television as a supporting actress in hit telenovelas such as the comedies Sol tardío and La Colorina (1975–1978) by Arturo Moya Grau, and in De cara al mañana (1982) by María Elena Gertner.

She also performed in emblematic telenovelas such as La represa, La torre 10, La dama del balcón, La Villa, Mi nombre es Lara, A la sombra del ángel, Amor a domicilio, Adrenalina, A todo dar, Romané, Pampa Ilusión, and El circo de las Montini.

In 2015, she stood as the sole female candidate among five selected for the National Prize for Performing and Audiovisual Arts, ultimately won by actor Héctor Noguera. That year, she garnered numerous tributes and acknowledgments for her extensive contributions to the performing arts. National Prize for Performing and Audiovisual Arts, whose winner was actor Héctor Noguera. In the same year, she received several tributes and recognitions for her vast career in the performing arts.

Her last performances included appearances in various television series and some valued performances in independent theater companies, allowing herself to be honored in each presentation.

== Biography ==
=== Early years and childhood ===
Born of the marriage formed by Víctor Vidaurre Coo and Rosa Violeta Heiremans Brockman. of Belgian and German origin, Violeta Vidaurre was the eldest of three siblings and a cousin of the doctor, actor, storyteller, novelist and playwright Luis Alberto Heiremans and the businessman Eugenio Heiremans. On her childhood the actress said, "I was always very pampered by my parents, but the one with whom I had more complicity and affinity was my dad. Sometimes I think I was in love with him."

Coming from an aristocratic or upper-class family from Santiago's Barrio República, her basic education took place at the Colegio Sagrado Corazón, Villa María Academy, and Sacred Heart of Argentine nuns. "In school plays they never gave me the role to represent the Virgin, because I had bad behavior. I suffered a lot because of that, but in the end I was reassured because the house had a good time when we made the sets with costumes and wigs." Since she was a child, she showed her acting skills with her cousin Luis Alberto, who wrote and performed plays that were staged at her grandfather's house, as in the case of Atahuicha, la reina de la selva, which Luis Alberto wrote and directed.

Vidaurre entered into her first marriage at age 19 with Ramón Salgado Suárez, a marine guard of the school ship Lautaro, which caught fire before his eyes off Callao in 1945. "In those years I valued my marriage and I did not go to study theater although I liked it. Only at the age of 28 Luis Alberto convinced me to enter to study theater, and then I started replacing actresses until this became a real passion."

== Artistic career ==
Vidaurre entered to study acting at the Academy of Dramatic Art of the Experimental Theater of the Pontifical Catholic University, graduating with maximum distinction. In this process, she was a colleague of Paz Yrarrázabal – later school director, Ramón Ñúñez – 2009 National Art Prize winner, and Héctor Noguera – 2015 Performing Arts Prize winner, among others. She took to the massive stages replacing some actresses, and was cast in a role by the American director Frank McMullan, who had been invited to direct the play Look Homeward, Angel by Thomas Wolfe in 1959.

After completing her academic training and role in Look Homeward, Angel, she was able to quickly join the cast of actors of the Experimental Theater with Ana González, Mario Montilles, Silvia Piñeiro, Anita Klesky, Nelly Meruane, Justo Ugarte, Maruja Cifuentes, and others. Since then, she has performed in plays such as Much Ado About Nothing, Versos de ciego, Dialogues of the Carmelites, Le Bourgeois gentilhomme, and Casimiro Vico Primer Actor.

She participated in the premiere of La pérgola de las flores by Isidora Aguirre in 1961, playing the role of Mrs. Laura Larraín. In an interview, the actress declared: "Eugenio Guzmán, the director of the play, first placed me in the choir and then chose me as a replacement for Silvia Piñeiro and there I stayed for several seasons." In a short time the play became a massive popular culture phenomenon. It occupied all the spaces that the media offered at that time, transforming image and sound into a true cultural sensation, making an international tour through Argentina, Mexico, and Europe.

She joined the artistic team of Los cuatro, a theater company based on the creative abilities of each one of the artists that made up a cast, formed by Orietta Escámez, Humberto and Héctor Duvauchelle, with the participation of Víctor Jara, Claudio di Girolamo, Mireya Véliz, Isabel Allende, Raúl Ruiz, Hugo Miller, René Combeau, and Domingo Tessier. At the same time, she belonged to the Theater Research Workshop (TIT), from 1968 to 1971, under the direction of Fernando Colina and Enrique Noisvander. Highlights of this period include plays such as Peligro a 50 metros, Nos tomamos la Universidad, and Antigone, the latter led by Víctor Jara. In 1972 she was invited to the Teatro Opera's Bim bam bum magazine, where she made several artistic presentations.

Along with this love of theatrical art, Vidaurre participated in national and international tours of countries such as Argentina, Mexico, France, and Spain. Among the plays that were part of these itineraries were Tartuffe, Las chiquillas van a la pelea, Monólogos de Dario Fo, Las señoras de los jueves, and the comedy El rapto del galán de la teleserie.

Her television debut was in Canal 13 televised plays, giving her greater exposure. At the end of the 1960s, she joined the stable cast of television network actors, debuting in the daily series Juntos se pasa mejor and Juani en Sociedad, with great success. She also played Doña Bernarda Cordero in Martín Rivas, and continued to play roles in soap operas. Years later she moved to Televisión Nacional de Chile (TVN) at the suggestion of her friend Sonia Fuchs, where she performed in De cara al mañana, La represa, La torre 10, La dama del balcón, La Villa, and Mi nombre es Lara, among others.

During the 2000 season, she joined the stable cast of director Vicente Sabatini, appearing in successful telenovelas such as Romané, Pampa Ilusión, El circo de las Montini, and Puertas adentro. She was also a member of the cast of Mekano's youth miniseries, directed by Álex Hernández, such as Don Floro, Xfea2, EsCool, and Gordis.

In this period, she had notable friendships with the theater and television producer Sonia Fuchs (1931–1991), the actress and National Art Prize winner Marés González (1925–2008) and the actress and writer María Elena Gertner (1932–2013).

During 2012 she participated in Javiera Contador and Fernando Godoy's comedy program Desfachatados, with a parody of the program Mamá a los 15 named Mamá a los 80.

== Later years ==
Over the years, her output diminished but she still continued making special appearances in TV series such as 12 días que estremecieron Chile and Lo que callamos las mujeres, on youth telenovelas like Gordis, Decibel 110, and her last appearance on television as a guest actress on 2014's Chipe libre, along with Jaime Vadell and Gloria Münchmeyer. In theater she acted in Las chiquillas van a la pelea (2015) and Esperanzo la carroza (2016), playing Mamá Cora in the latter.

In 2015, she was the only woman to be a candidate (out of five selected) for the National Prize for Performing and Audiovisual Arts, whose winner was actor Héctor Noguera. In the same year, she received several tributes and recognitions for her vast career in the performing arts.

I want to die like Elena Moreno, who was taken from the theater and taken away.

— Violeta Vidaurre on Radio Cooperativa, 30 September 2011.

During 2015 she received several tributes and recognitions for her vast career in the performing arts.

In 2017, she was taken to a nursing home due to Alzheimer's disease, amid allegations that she had been forcibly hospitalized. She died from the disease on 1 June 2021, aged 92.

== Theater ==
- 1958 – Atahuicha, la reina de la selva, directed by Luis Alberto Heiremans
- 1958 – Esta señorita Trini
- 1959 – El ángel que nos mira, directed by Frank McMullan
- 1959 – El diálogo de las carmelitas, directed by Eugenio Dittborn
- 1960 – La pérgola de las flores, directed by Eugenio Guzmán
- 1961 – Versos de ciego
- 1961 – La ronda de la buena nueva
- 1963 – Much Ado About Nothing
- 1964 – El tony chico, directed by Luis Alberto Heiremans
- 1965 – Casimiro Vico Primer Actor
- 1966 – Tiempo para convivir, directed by Hugo Miller
- El diálogo de las carmelitas
- Monólogos de Dario Fo
- 1967 – Un negro en el cielo
- 1969 – Nos tomamos la universidad, directed by Gustavo Meza
- 1969 – Antigone, directed by Víctor Jara
- 1970 – Todas las colorinas tienen pecas, directed by Eugenio Dittborn
- 1971 – Paraíso para uno, directed by Eugenio Dittborn
- 1972 – El pastor lobo (stories by Isabel Allende)
- 1975 – Le Bourgeois gentilhomme, directed by Eugenio Dittborn
- 1977 – Las señoras de los jueves, directed by Christian Villarreal
- 1978 – Equus
- 1981 – Los 7 pecados capitales
- 1981 – Mary Stuart, directed by Raúl Osorio
- 1982 – Mama Rosa
- 1983 – Como en la Gran Ciudad
- 1984 – Testimonio de un sueño
- 1985 – Tartuffe
- 1987 – El almacén de la vieja Justa
- 1991 – La última noche que pasé contigo, directed by Roberto Nicolini
- 1997 – Entre gallos y medianoche
- 1998 – El caballero de la muerte
- 1999 – Ni tonta ni perezosa, directed by Silva Gutiérrez
- 2001 – Sol tardío, directed by Horacio Valdeavellano
- 2002 – Déjame que te cuente que las abuelas sí son para el verano, directed by Roberto Nicolini
- 2003 – Las chiquillas van a la pelea, directed by Katty Kowaleczko
- 2003 – Más zarzuela, directed by Eduardo Soto
- 2005 – De mi boca a tu boca, directed by Christian Villarreal
- 2007 – El rapto del galán de la teleserie, directed by Christian Villarreal
- 2008 – Sindicato de variedades
- 2008 – Cena para dos
- 2009 – Steel Magnolias
- 2009 – Ellas quieren... él no puede
- 2010 – Ella 80, yo 50
- 2010 – La pérgola de las flores, directed by Silvia Santelices
- 2010 – Los que van quedando en el camino, directed by Guillermo Calderón
- 2011 – ¿Quién se queda con mamá?, directed by Christian Villarreal
- 2012 – Casa de ejercicios espirituales, directed by Cristóbal García
- 2013 – Vivan nuestros poetas, directed by José Peña
- 2015 – Las chiquillas van a la pelea
- 2016 – Amor a los 80
- 2016 – La noche de san Juan
- 2016 – Mamá Cora (Argentine adaptation of Esperando la carroza)

== Telenovelas ==
Year	Title	Role	Type	Channel
1971	Sin amor	Elena Méndez	Cast	Canal 13
1975	J.J. Juez	Rosa Riquelme	Cast	Canal 13
1976	Sol tardío	Fresia Maturana	Cast	TVN
1977	La Colorina	Ofelia Yáñez	Cast	TVN
1982	De cara al mañana	Rosa Cárcamo	Cast	TVN
1982	La gran mentira	Ermelinda Gutiérrez	Cast	TVN
1983	El juego de la vida	Gabriela viuda de Salinas	Cast	TVN
1984	La represa	Rebeca Betancourt	Cast	TVN
1984	La torre 10	Aída Menares	Cast	TVN
1985	Morir de amor	Violeta Vega	Recurring role	TVN
1986	La dama del balcón	Amparo Robledo	Cast	TVN
1986	La Villa	Corina López	Cast	TVN
1987	Mi nombre es Lara	Aurora Gómez	Cast	TVN
1988	Vivir así	Josefa Latorre	Recurring role	Canal 13
1989	A la sombra del ángel	Encarnación Fuenzalida	Cast	TVN
1990	El milagro de vivir	Betsabé Molina	Cast	TVN
1992	Fácil de amar	María Faúndez	Cast	Canal 13
1994	Top secret	Ramona Khön	Cast	Canal 13
1995	Amor a domicilio	Aurora Castro	Cast	Canal 13
1996	Adrenalina	Matilde Moreno	Cast	Canal 13
1997	Rossabella	Estela Villalba	Cast	Mega
1998	A todo dar	Luz María Balboa	Cast	Mega
1999	Algo está cambiando	Magnolia Echeñique	Cast	Mega
2000	Romané	Olimpia Brito	Cast	TVN
2001	Pampa Ilusion	Amanda Jorquera	Cast	TVN
2002	El circo de las Montini	Termutis Norambuena	Cast	TVN
2003	Puertas adentro	Mercedes Farías	Cast	TVN
2004	Don Floro	Graciela Acevedo	Cast	Mega
2005	Xfea2	María Baeza	Cast	Mega
2005	EsCool	Tránsito Valdés	Cast	Mega
2007	Fortunato	Isolina Briceño	Guest	Mega
2009	Conde Vrolok	Ercilia Núñez	Cast	TVN
2011	Decibel 110	Adela Alfaro	Guest	Mega
2012	Gordis	Alexandra Egaña	Recurring role	Chilevisión
2014	Chipe libre	Olguita Portela	Guest	Canal 13

== TV series and specials ==
Year	Title	Role	Channel	Notes
1965-1966	Juntos se pasa mejor	Marjorie Sánchez	Canal 13	Cast
1967-1972	Juani en Sociedad	Adriana de Hortiz	Canal 13	Cast
1968	El loco estero	Eleonora Gutiérrez	Canal 13	Cast
1969	Incomunicados	Victoria Santander	Canal 13	Cast
1970	Martín Rivas	Bernarda Cordero	TVN	Cast
1994	Fácil de amar, la comedia	María Faúndez	Canal 13	Cast
1996	Amor a domicilio, la comedia	Aurora Castro	Canal 13	Cast
2000	La otra cara del espejo	Myriam	Mega	Episode: "Regalo de Cumpleaños"
2003	La vida es una lotería	Victoria Ramírez	TVN	Episode: "Hogar paraíso"
2002	El Día Menos Pensado	Amelia Bahamondez	TVN	Episode: "El Tesoro"
2004	El cuento del tío	Delfina Orrego	TVN	Episode: "Hombre soltero busca..."
2005	Casados	Nora Venegas	Chilevisión	Episode: "La familia"
2006	La Nany	Dalia Núñez	Mega	Episode: "El novio de la tía Yoli"; Episode: "El mal día de la Nany"
2006	La otra cara del espejo	Belinda Cáceres	Mega	
2006	La vida es una lotería	Carmen Pacheco	TVN	Episode: "El milagro" Episode: "Repartiendo amor"
2009	Otra vez papá	Sara Montenegro	Mega	Season 3
2009	Mis años grossos	Adelaida Molina	Chilevisión	Guest
2009	Aquí no hay quien viva	Emily O'Ryan	Chilevisión	Guest (1 episode)
2009	Corín Tellado	Teresa Lagos	Chilevisión	Episode: "Matrimonio por poder"
2010	La Colonia	Mariana Fernández	Mega	Guest (1 episode)
2011	12 días que estremecieron Chile	Marta Quintero	Chilevisión	Episode: "27 de febrero de 2010"
2012	Infieles	Adela Pérez	Chilevisión	Guest (1 episode)
2013	Lo que callamos las mujeres	Leonor Soto	Chilevisión	Guest (1 episode)

== Film ==
Year	Title	Role	Director	Notes
1964	El burócrata González		Tito Davison	
1965	Más allá del pipilco		Tito Davison	
1971	El afuerino		Alejo Álvarez	
1984	Como aman los chilenos		Alejo Álvarez	
2004	El Socio	Mandfredo's wife	Gastón Roca	
2009	Melodrama Lo-Fi	Owner of the pension	Alexis Aldana	
2011	Punto de partida	Suegra	Manuel Venegas	
2012	Isidora	Ella misma		Documentary
2014	La madre del cordero		Rosario Espinosa y Enrique Farías	
2014	Un concierto inolvidable: La Nueva Ola		Elías Llanos	

== Other appearances ==
- Viva el teatro (2005) - Various characters
- Desfachatados (Megavisión, 2012) - Guest
- Teatro en Chilevisión (Chilevisión) - Guest

== Awards and recognitions ==
=== APES Award ===
Year	Category	Result
2011	Artistic Career	Winner

=== Enrique Silva Cimma Award ===
Year	Category	Result
2015	Artistic Career	Winner

=== Other recognitions ===
- Career recognition from the Municipality of Villarrica, 2007
- Career award at the 16th Chillán International Film Festival, 2011
- Career recognition and tribute at the Theater Actors' Syndicate (SIDARTE), 2015
- Career award from the Rancagua Corporation of Culture and Illustrious Arts, 2015
- Career recognition from the Municipality of El Bosque, 2017
