= ¿Dónde está Elisa? =

¿Dónde está Elisa? may refer to:

- ¿Dónde está Elisa? (Chilean TV series), a 2009 Chilean thriller television soap opera
- ¿Dónde está Elisa? (American TV series), a 2010 Spanish-language telenovela
