= La ley de Baltazar =

- Genre: Telenovela
- Created by: Rodrigo Bastidas; Daniella Castagno
- Written by: Elena Muñoz; Milena Bastidas; José Fonseca
- Directed by: Nicolás Alemparte; Manuel Soto; Bárbara Della Schiava
- Starring: Francisco Reyes; Amparo Noguera; Daniela Ramírez; Gabriel Cañas; Simón Pešutić
- Country of origin: Chile
- Original language: Spanish
- No. of seasons: 1
- No. of episodes: 221

Production
- Executive producers: María Eugenia Rencoret; Daniela Demicheli; Juan Carlos Arriagada; Vania Portilla
- Producer: Shigri Sánchez
- Editor: Nelson Valdés
- Camera setup: Multi-camera
- Production companies: Mega; Chilefilms

Original release
- Network: Mega
- Release: June 7, 2022 – May 10, 2023

La ley de Baltazar is a Chilean telenovela created by Rodrigo Bastidas y Daniella Castagno for Mega. It aired from June 7, 2022 to May 10, 2023. It stars Francisco Reyes, Amparo Noguera, Daniela Ramírez, Gabriel Cañas and Simón Pešutić.

== Plot ==
Baltazar Rodríguez (Francisco Reyes) is a widowed man full of mysteries who lives on his farm by the sea. He has three children with whom he does not have a good relationship. After suffering a heart attack, Baltazar's children ask him to retire, but he wants to keep working and change society's view of the elderly. In addition, he will look for a way to conquer the great love of his life, Margarita (Amparo Noguera), a nun who is in charge of the town's school. Baltazar's daughter, Antonia (Daniela Ramírez), wants to find a way to take care of him, although his sons, Mariano (Gabriel Cañas) and Gabriel (Simón Pešutić), have their interests in his farm and see in his delicate condition the perfect excuse to sell it.

== Cast ==
=== Main ===
- Francisco Reyes as Baltazar Rodríguez
- Amparo Noguera as Margarita Fuentes
- Daniela Ramírez as Antonia Rodríguez
- Gabriel Cañas as Mariano Rodríguez
- Simón Pešutić as Gabriel Rodríguez
- Francisca Imboden as Cristina Moya
- Andrés Velasco as Manuel Silva
- Ignacia Baeza as Sofía Moncada
- Mabel Farías as Rosa Zúñiga
- Fernanda Salazar as Anita Zúñiga
- Claudio Castellón as Fernando Gatica
- Felipe Rojas as Gerónimo Mendoza
- Victoria de Gregorio as Teresa Maldonado
- Santiago Meneghello as Sebastián Schmidt
- Gabriel Urzúa as Hernán Amunátegui
- Andrea Eltit as Clarita Vial
- Luis Rodríguez as Luchito Gatica
- Diego Madrigal as Benjamín Rodríguez
- Francisca Armstrong as Candelaria Olmedo
- Vivian Inostroza as Colomba Rodríguez
- Matías Bielostotzky as Matías Gatica

=== Guest stars ===
- Catalina Stuardo as Elisa Martínez
- Javiera Hernández as Paula Fuentes
- Hugo Vásquez as Dr. Horacio Ledesma
- Eduardo Reyes as José
- Matías Fernández as Genaro

== Ratings ==
Season	Episodes	First aired		Last aired	
Season	Episodes	Date	Rating (in points)	Date	Rating (in points)
1	221	June 7, 2022	22.3	May 10, 2023	19.3
