= Francisco Melo =

Chilean actor, producer and also model (born 1966)

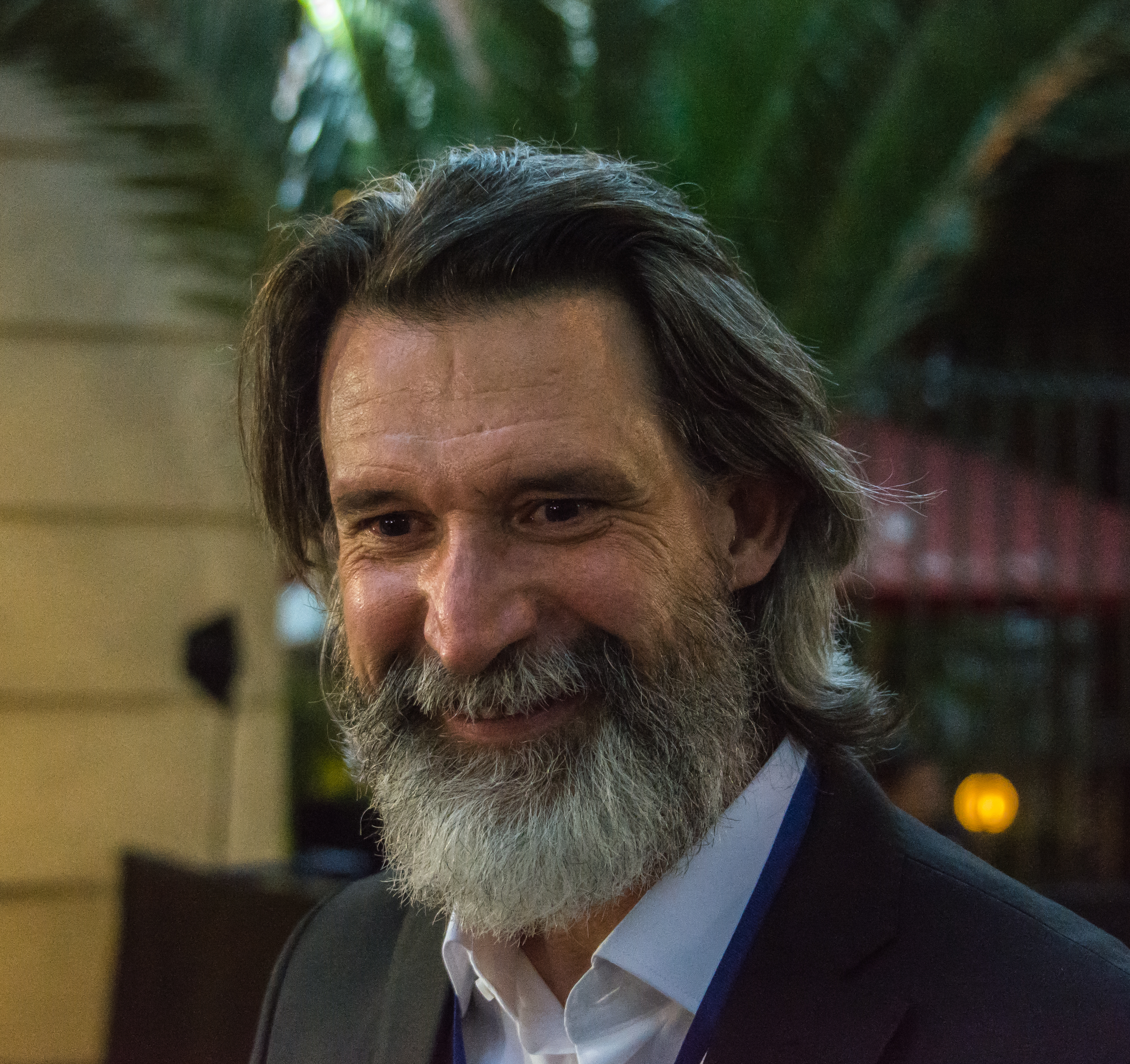
- Born: Juan Francisco Melo Miquel; February 14, 1966 (age 60); Santiago, Chile
- Occupations: Actor, Producer, TV presenter
- Years active: 1993–present
- Spouse: Patricia Velasco (divorced)
- Partners: Amparo Noguera; Daniela Lhorente (2004–present)
- Children: 2

Juan Francisco Melo Miquel (born February 14, 1966) is a Chilean actor, producer and also model. His first TV performance was in the TVN program Mea Culpa in 1993. From then on he has appeared in several soap operas, movies and TV shows.

== Personal life ==
=== Relationships ===
Melo is private about his personal life. He was married to actress Patricia Velasco and they had two children, Florencia and Vincente. After nearly a decade of marriage they divorced. Melo was later in a relationship with actress Amparo Noguera, daughter of actor Hector Noguera.

Melo has been in a relationship with actress Daniela Lhorente since 2004.

== Filmography ==
Television roles
Year	Title	Role	Notes
1994	Top secret	Rubén	
1995	Estúpido Cupido	Peter O'Kelly	
1996	Sucupira	Diógenes Tobar	
1997	Oro verde	Padre Felipe	
1998	Iorana	Yorgo Ismael	
1999	La Fiera	Julio Alvarado	
2000	Romané	Rafael Domínguez	
2001	Pampa Ilusión	Manuel Clark	
2002	El circo de las Montini	David Riquelme / David Valenti	
2003	Puertas adentro	Bruno Martínez	
2004	Los Pincheira	Shadi Abu Kassem	
2005	Los treinta	Fernando Hidalgo	
2005	Versus	Diego Saldaña / Iván Saldaña	
2007	Alguien te mira	Rodrigo Quintana	
2007	Amor por accidente	Martín Amenábar	
2008	Viuda Alegre	Félix Mujica	
2008	Hijos del Monte	Himself	
2009	¿Dónde está Elisa?	Raimundo Domínguez	
2010	40 y Tantos	Diego Elizalde	
2011	Témpano	Álvaro Grau	
2011–2013	Prófugos	Emiliano Encina	
2012	Lynch	Gabriel Hoffman	Episode: "Un final casi feliz"
2012	Reserva de familia	Miguel Ruiz-Tagle	
2013	Dos por uno	Gonzalo Meyer	
2013–2015	Woki Toki	Narrador Psicólogo	Episode: "Un Cuento de Navidad" Episode: "Adictos a Internet"
2014	Vuelve temprano	Antonio Fuenzalida	
2014	Caleta del sol	Crescente Maturana	
2015	Sitiados	Alonso Carvallo y Vásquez	
2015	El bosque de Karadima, la serie	Padre Aguirre	
2015	La poseída	Eleodoro Mackenna	
2016–2017	Sres. Papis	Fernando Pereira	
2017–2018	Tranquilo papá	Domingo Aldunate	
2018–2019	Isla Paraíso	Oscar León	
2024	Los Casablanca	Iván Casablanca	

Film roles
Year	Title	Role	Notes
2007	The Toast	David	
2015	El bosque de Karadima	Padre Aguirre	
2015	Toro Loco Sangriento	Toro Loco	
2024	Bitter Gold	Pacífico	

== Awards ==
=== Altazor ===
Year	Category	Telenovela/Play	Resultado
2006	Best Television Actor	Los treinta	Nominated
2008	Best Television Actor	Alguien te mira	Nominated
2010	Best Actor	¿Dónde esta Elisa?	Nominated
2009	Best Stage Actor	El mercader de Venecia	Nominated

=== Fotech ===
Year	Category	Telenovela	Result
2005	Best Character in Comedy	Los Pincheira	Won
2010	Best Actor	¿Dónde esta Elisa?	Won

=== Festival de San Diego ===
Year	Category	Movie	Result
2008	People Award	El Brindis	Won

=== APES ===
Year	Category	Telenovela	Result
2002	Best Actor	El Circo de las Montini	Nominated

=== Copihue de Oro ===
Year	Category	Result
2005	Best Actor	Nominated
