= Sres. Papis =

Sres. Papis may refer to:

- Sres. Papis (Argentine TV series), 2014
- Sres. Papis (Chilean TV series), 2016-2017
