= Viviana Rodríguez =

Chilean actress

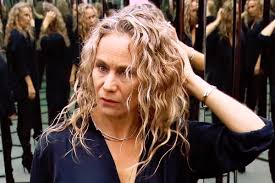
- Rodríguez in 2020
- Born: Viviana Cecilia Rodríguez Dreckmann; December 2, 1970 (age 55); Santiago, Chile
- Education: University of Chile
- Occupation: Actress
- Children: 1

Viviana Cecilia Rodríguez Dreckmann (Santiago, December 2, 1970) is a Chilean actress.

== Biography ==
She completed her secondary education at Colegio Nido de Águilas and studied acting at the University of Chile.

In 1993, she made her acting debut in the Canal 13 telenovela "Doble juego." She then continued working at TVN in "Sucupira", "Oro verde", and "Iorana", until she decided to take a break from acting.

In the early 2000s, she left Chile and lived in the United States for two years to study at the Lee Strasberg Theatre & Film Institute. She returned in 2003 to act in Machos, Hippie, and Brujas as well as the films Gente decente and Mujeres infieles.

In 2017, she gained popularity for her extensive acting work as María Luisa Guzmán in the series Verdades ocultas, becoming one of the most beloved characters due to the character's behavior throughout the series. In Mega she also acted in telenovelas such as Decibel 110, Eres mi tesoro, Señores Papis.

In 2023, she starred in a virtual play in Miami called "Quizás, Quizás, Quizás," in which she participated alongside her daughter. She is living in the United States with her since she entered Juilliard School.

== Personal life ==
She was married to Chilean businessman Marco Simunovic, with whom she had a daughter called Ágatha Simunovic.

== Filmography ==
=== Films ===
- Gente decente (2004)
- Mujeres infieles (2004)
- Instrucciones para mi funeral (2012)
- Tiempos decentes (2013)
- Talion (2015)
- Gun Shy (2017)
- Vidas recicladas (2018)

=== Television ===
Telenovelas
Year	Title	Role
1993	Doble juego	Antonia Alzavía
1994	Top secret	Trinidad Mena
1995	Juegos de fuego	Moira Spencer
1996	Sucupira	Sofía Montero
1997	Oro verde	Gabriela Meyer
1998	Iorana	Francisca Labbé «Matakuri»
2003	Machos	Consuelo Valdés
2004	Hippie	Rafaela Morgán
2005	Brujas	Josefina Altamirano
2009	Los exitosos Pells	Lupita Del Real
2010	40 y Tantos	Carolina Cousiño
2011	Decibel 110	Magdalena Arismendi
2014	Vuelve temprano	Renata Arancibia
2015	Eres mi tesoro	Carolina Ruiz
2016	Sres. papis	Blanca Harris
2017-2021	Verdades ocultas	María Luisa Guzmán

Series
Year	Title	Role
1997	Las historias de Sussi	Brenda
2002	Cuentos de mujeres	Sofía
2007	Mujeres que matan	
2009	Peligro latente	
2010	Cartas de mujer	
2011	Otra vez papá	Magdalena
2013	Maldito corazón	María Carolina Geel
