= César Caillet =

Chilean actor

- Born: César Andrés Caillet Álvarez; 9 January 1974; Temuco, Chile
- Occupations: Actor, lawyer

César Caillet Álvarez is a Chilean actor (born 9 January 1974 in Temuco), studied in the Instituto chileno-francés of the city of Temuco. Graduated with a law degree, knowing that he would not pursue his degree, dedicated himself to acting. He studied Theater in the school of Fernando González, had a love–hate relationship with one of his teachers and today's semi-idol, Marcelo Alonso, and became a great actor at 29 years old. Made his debut in “Los Pincheira”, he became famous as the “cool” Jaime of “Ídolos” and after a role in “Los Capo”, ended up going to the drama-area of Canal 13, in Papi Ricky and the mini-series Héroes. Has worked in several Chilean soap operas, including Los Pincheira and ¿Dónde está Elisa?.

== Filmography ==
=== Television ===
Year	Title	Role	Notes
2026	La baronesa	León Insulza	
2017	Perdona nuestros pecados	Ernesto Möller	
2015	Eres mi tesoro	Rodrigo Pezoa	Main Antagonist
2013	El regreso	Néstor Bulnes	
2012	Reserva De Familia	Adrián Fernández	
2010	40 y Tantos	Génaro Monckerberg	
2010	Circo de Estrellas	Himself	
2009-2010	Sin Anestesia	Pablo Goycoechea	
2009	¿Dónde está Elisa?	Javier Goyeneche Munita	
2007	Papi Ricky	Tomás Vidal	
2006	Floribella	Luciano Velasco	
2006	Disparejas	Francés	
2005	Los Capo	Hipólito Rojas	
2004	Ídolos	Jaime Montecinos	
2004	Los Pincheira	Francisco Del Canto	
