= Los Casablanca =

- Genre: Telenovela
- Created by: Ximena Carrera; María José Galleguillos
- Written by: Arnaldo Madrid; Felipe Zambrano; Claudia Hidalgo
- Directed by: Felipe Arratia Díaz
- Starring: Francisco Reyes; Francisco Melo; Sigrid Alegría
- Country of origin: Chile
- Original language: Spanish
- No. of seasons: 1
- No. of episodes: 156

Production
- Executive producers: Patricio López; Vania Portilla
- Producer: Verónica Brañes
- Camera setup: Multi-camera
- Production company: Chilefilms

Original release
- Network: Mega
- Release: December 3, 2024 – September 24, 2025

Los Casablanca is a Chilean telenovela created by Ximena Carrera and María José Galleguillos. It aired on Mega from December 3, 2024 to September 24, 2025. The telenovela stars Francisco Reyes, Francisco Melo and Sigrid Alegría.

== Plot ==
The telenovela follows a powerful family whose stability is shaken by the return of Iván Casablanca, who seeks to destroy Raimundo Casablanca, his brother. Years ago, Iván disappeared from the country after betraying Raimundo and leaving him with debts that made the economic empire of the Casablancas falter. Without announcing his return, Iván is ready to take away the family fortune that Raimundo has built throughout his life. To carry out his revenge, Iván counts on Miranda, his partner, who will help him achieve his goal: to win the trust of Raimundo and then steal the family fortune and ruin him ruthlessly. However, Miranda and Raimundo develop real feelings for each other that could ruin Iván's plans.

== Cast ==
- Francisco Reyes as Raimundo Casablanca
- Francisco Melo as Iván Casablanca
- Sigrid Alegría as Miranda Infante
- Mariana Di Girolamo as Alexandra Casablanca
- Nicolás Poblete as Tomás Errázuriz
- Vivianne Dietz as Luciana Prado
- Jorge Arecheta as Juan Pablo Urrutia
- Octavia Bernasconi as Martina Casablanca
- Max Salgado as Jonás Casablanca
- María Elena Duvauchelle as Genoveva Del Real
- Felipe Rojas as Tormento Arancibia
- Lorena Bosch as Ivette Sanhueza
- Rodrigo Soto as Ángel Soto
- Francisco Reyes Cristi as Samuel Casablanca
- Matilde Stuardo Noguera as Gabriela Barrientos

== Reception ==
=== Ratings ===
Season	Episodes	First aired		Last aired	
Season	Episodes	Date	Rating (in points)	Date	Rating (millions)
1	156	December 3, 2024	18.3	September 24, 2025	0.99

=== Awards and nominations ===
Year	Award	Category	Nominated	Result	Ref
2025	Produ Awards	Best Superseries	Los Casablanca	Nominated	
2025	Produ Awards	Best Lead Actor - Superseries	Francisco Melo	Nominated	
2025	Produ Awards	Best Supporting Actor - Superseries	Nicolás Poblete	Nominated	
2025	Produ Awards	Best Directing - Superseries or Telenovela	Felipe Arratia	Nominated	
