= Romané =

Chilean telenovela

Romané is a Chilean soap opera (telenovela) that was first aired on March 6, 2000 as part of the first semester prime-time lineup of soap operas on TVN. It competed against Canal 13’s Sabor A Ti.

== Plot ==
The last time the beautiful Roma woman Jovanka Antich (Claudia Di Girólamo) was in Chile, she was a teenager and had a secret, torrid affair with Raphael Dominguez (Francisco Melo) the son of a local well-to-do family. The affair ended badly, with both of them believing that the other betrayed them - when really it was Raphael’s mother Victoria North (Marés González) with the help of the power hungry and vengeful Roma Drago (José Soza) who tricked the young lovers into hating each other and separating.

The day they had planned to run away together Raphael doesn’t show and Jovanka leaves Mejillones alone, never to tell him she is pregnant. She ends up in Spain where she has a baby girl and marries a wealthy and good Roma man named Jairo. They adopt two other girls, and the three of them grow up believing they all adopted.

Jovanka has now returned to Chile, with her daughters and now a rich widow, after 25 years to attend her father’s wedding. Her father, Melquíades (Héctor Noguera) has brought his whole tribe with him to Mejillones where he plans on marrying the young beauty Milenka California (Blanca Lewin), daughter of Jovanka's once-fiancé Lazlo (Alfredo Castro). Jovanka finds herself once again in this town that brings back so many memories.

Townspeople like Victoria North have an adverse hatred and prejudice towards gypsies, but the town itself is doing poorly with many businesses on the verge of bankruptcy, and the arrival of the Roma will change all that. It's not long before Jovanka runs into Raphael again, and Victoria, afraid that she'll be found out, comes to tell her to leave.

From here is where things get complicated. People start attempting plots against Raphael. Victoria and Drago once again plot together to get rid of Jovanka. And Drago has his own plans to get rid of his best friend Melquiades so that he can become the leader of the tribe and have revenge against him. Jovanka meanwhile starts to fall in love with Raphael's older brother Juan (Francisco Reyes) who unlike his brother has a great affection for the gypsies. However, he happens to be a priest, and both Jovanka and Rafael struggle with the mix of hate and love they feel for each other. And Raphael's son, Sebastián (Ricardo Fernández) becomes enamored with Maria Salomé (Francisca Imboden), one of Jovanka’s daughters, who may or may not be his half-sister.

== Cast ==
- Claudia Di Girolamo as Jovanka Antich
- Francisco Reyes as Juan Bautista Domínguez
- Francisco Melo as Rafael Domínguez
- Marés González as Victoria North
- Ricardo Fernández as Sebastián Domínguez
- Francisca Imboden as María Salomé
- Antonia Zegers as María Jacobé
- Amparo Noguera as María Magdalena
- Héctor Noguera as Melquiades Antich
- Néstor Cantillana as Raúl Escudero
- José Soza as Drago Stanovich
- Luz Jiménez as Mamá Pasca
- Álvaro Morales as Rodrigo Cordero
- Alfredo Castro as Lazlo California
- Felipe Ríos as Perhan California
- Blanca Lewin as Milenka California
- Alessandra Guerzzoni as Vinka California
- Luis Alarcón as Baldomero Lillo
- Óscar Hernández as Alfredo Gaete
- Consuelo Holzapfel as Ofelia Lillo
- Delfina Guzmán as Adela of Gaete
- Eduardo Barril as Ismael Cordero
- Violeta Vidaurre as Olimpia Brito
- Carmen Disa Gutiérrez as Muriel Cruces
- Sergio Hernández as Estefan Dinamarca
- Roxana Campos as Zaida Dinamarca
- Pablo Schwarz as Mirko Dinamarca
- Andrea Freund as Rosario Gaete
- Álvaro Espinoza as Claudio Gaete
- Claudia Cabezas as Javiera Bolaños
- Mauricio Inzunza as Mario Cruces
- Claudio Ravanal as Ianko Ilich
- Juan Falcón as Branco Antich
- Erto Pantoja : Ulises Jara
- Daniela Lhorente as Paula Arévalo
- Mireya Véliz as Inés Suárez
- Ernesto Gutiérrez as The Anchoveta
- Héctor Aguilar as The Piure
- Ricardo Pinto as The Taza
