= Sucupira (TV series) =

- Genre: Telenovela
- Based on: O Bem-Amado by Dias Gomes
- Written by: Víctor Carrasco; Hugo Morales; Gonzalo Peralta
- Directed by: Vicente Sabatini
- Starring: Héctor Noguera; Delfina Guzmán; Francisco Reyes; Ángela Contreras; Álvaro Rudolphy
- Opening theme: Te quiero enamorar by Timbala
- Country of origin: Chile
- Original language: Spanish
- No. of episodes: 108

Production
- Executive producer: Verónica Saquel
- Producer: Marcelo Muñoz
- Running time: 60 minutes
- Production company: Televisión Nacional de Chile

Original release
- Network: TVN
- Release: March 11 – August 9, 1996

Related
- Juegos de fuego; Loca piel; O Bem-Amado; El Bienamado

Sucupira is a Chilean telenovela produced and broadcast by Televisión Nacional de Chile from March 11 to August 9, 1996, starring Héctor Noguera, Delfina Guzmán, Francisco Reyes, Ángela Contreras and Álvaro Rudolphy. It is based on the 1973 Brazilian telenovela O Bem-Amado produced by Rede Globo. As with other installments during the so-called "golden age of TVN", the production featured an extensive cast, a greater focus on comedy, and an exotic location (the fictional seaside town of Sucupira, shot in Papudo and Zapallar)

== Plot summary ==
The long-serving mayor of a sleepy fishing town is eager to inaugurate his latest campaign promise, a cemetery, but his plans are constantly thwarted by the absence of deaths in the community. The central love triangle is formed by the mayor's free-spirited daughter as she chooses between the town's doctor and the local reporter, both bitter adversaries of her father. The various antics of the town's colorful denizens occupy much of the plot.

== Cast ==
- Héctor Noguera as Federico Valdivieso Montt
- Ángela Contreras as Bárbara Valdivieso Fernández
- Francisco Reyes as Esteban Onetto Sanfuentes
- Viviana Rodríguez as Sofía Montero
- Álvaro Rudolphy as Rafael Aliaga
- Delfina Guzmán as Mariana Montero
- Luis Alarcón as Ambrosio Campos
- Coca Guazzini as Luisa Lineros
- Mauricio Pesutic as Renato Montenegro
- Patricia Rivadeneira as Regina Lineros
- Anita Klesky as Dora Lineros
- José Soza as Segundo Fábrega
- Claudia Burr as Soledad Campos Gutiérrez
- Álvaro Morales as Raimundo "Rucio" Prado Cárdenas
- Consuelo Holzapfel as Elena Domínguez
- Alejandro Castillo as Ramiro Portela
- Ana Reeves as Carmen Gutiérrez
- Óscar Hernández as Carlos López
- Carmen Disa Gutiérrez as Olguita Marina
- Remigio Remedy as Rodrigo Valdivieso Fernández
- Felipe Braun as Cristián López Domínguez
- Tamara Acosta as Daniela López Domínguez
- Pablo Schwarz as Juan Aravena "Juan del Burro"
- Amparo Noguera as Norma Órdenes
- Francisco Melo as Diógenes Tobar
- Ximena Rivas as Susana de Portela
- Juan Pablo Bastidas as Fernando Rovira
- Valentina Pollarolo as Rocío Ureta
- Mario Montilles as Padre Damián
- Mireya Véliz as Hilda Moya
- Ana Luz Figueroa as Carla Silva
- Catalina Olcay as Francisca Silva
- Mónica Godoy as Loreto Inostroza
- Maité Pascal as Claudia Briceño
- Ricardo Pinto as Jeremías Alegría
- Ernesto Gutiérrez as El Cincuenta
- Samuel Guajardo as El Cabeza de Corcho
- Juan Carlos Montaña as El Pata de Jaiva
- Andrea Molina as Luna del Alba
- Carolina Infante as Catalina García
- Jaime Davagnino as Ángel
