= ¿Dónde está Elisa? (Chilean TV series) =

Chilean telenovela

- Title card
- Genre: Thriller, action, crime, suspense, mystery
- Created by: Pablo Illanes
- Screenplay by: Pablo Illanes; Nona Fernández; Hugo Morales; Josefina Fernández
- Directed by: Rodrigo Velásquez; Claudio López de Lérida
- Starring: Sigrid Alegría; Francisco Melo; Montserrat Prats; Paola Volpato; Francisco Reyes
- Country of origin: Chile
- Original language: Spanish
- No. of episodes: 112

Production
- Producers: Daniela Demicheli; Mauricio Campos
- Production locations: Santiago, Chile
- Camera setup: Single-camera
- Running time: 25 minutes
- Production company: Televisión Nacional de Chile

Original release
- Network: TVN
- Release: April 21 – November 4, 2009

Related
- ¿Dónde está Elisa? (2010); Kızım Nerede? (2010); Di Mana Melani (2010); Nasaan Ka Elisa? (2011); Laut Aao Trisha (2014); Family Secret (2014); Onde Está Elisa? (2018)

¿Dónde está Elisa? (lit: Where is Elisa?) is a Chilean thriller television soap opera, that first appeared on television on April 21 of 2009 on TVN. It is written by Pablo Illanes, with scripts from Pablo Illanes, Nona Fernández, Hugo Morales and Josefina Fernández and is directed by María Eugenia Rencoret.

The soap opera is noted for its several remakes or adaptations. Nearly a year after the show aired, three international remakes were produced, with the most popular one – made by American Spanish-language television channel Telemundo – bearing the same title as the original. The other two adaptations made in 2010, Turkish network aTV's Kızım Nerede? and Indonesian entertainment company MD Entertainment's Di Mana Melani, also saw success. Other subsequent remakes of ¿Dónde está Elisa? include Nasaan Ka, Elisa? (2011; by Filipino television company ABS-CBN), Family Secret (2014; by South Korean television network tvN), and Laut Aao Trisha (2014–15; by Indian pay television channel Life OK).

The story involves the events of the disappearance of Elisa (Montserrat Prats), one of the daughters of the couple formed by Raimundo Domínguez (Francisco Melo) and Francisca Correa (Sigrid Alegría), who after 17 years of marriage become so desperate that their own marriage is in danger.

Inspiration of the story comes from the real life drama involving vanished British native Madeleine McCann in Portugal. However, unlike the McCann story, the soap opera features a teenager who disappears and not a small child. The disappearance in a local club makes the story very similar to that of Jorge Matute Johns, a Chilean youngster who disappeared and was never seen again after leaving a party at a local disco. The list of suspects is long and includes family members, fellow students, and friends of the teenager who frequented the same places that she did prior to her disappearance.

Production of the opera began on August 14, 2008.

The first infomercial or preview of the production was shown on Friday, March 13, 2009.

== Plot ==
The lives of the Dominguez family will change forever based on the events surrounding the disappearance of Elisa (Montserrat Prats), one of the daughters of the marriage of Raimundo Domínguez (Francisco Melo) and Francisca Correa (Sigrid Alegría).

Once she disappears, we begin to learn the secrets of every member of the family as well as those of her friends. Paranoia sets in, the past is dragged up, matters that were supposed to be buried reappear and recriminations among family members start.

All these events lead to a long list of suspects, among them family members (uncles, cousins, and her parents), fellow students, former employees of the Domínguez family and several friends who used to frequent the same places she did prior to her disappearance.

== Cast ==
=== Main ===
- Montserrat Prats as Elisa Domínguez
- Francisco Melo as Raimundo Domínguez
- Sigrid Alegría as Francisca Correa
- Álvaro Rudolphy as Comisario Camilo Rivas
- Paola Volpato as Consuelo Domínguez
- Francisco Reyes as Bruno Alberti
- Francisca Imboden as Olivia Domínguez
- Álvaro Morales as Ignacio Cousiño
- César Caillet as Javier Goyeneche
- Bárbara Ruiz-Tagle as Juanita Ovalle
- Andrés Velasco as Nicólas Errázuriz
- Alejandra Fosalba as Pamela Portugal

=== Recurring ===
- Mauricio Pesutic as Perfecto Néstor Salazar
- Patricia López as Fiscal Adriana Castañeda
- Juan José Gurruchaga as Ex Detective Briceño
- Christian Sève as Sebastián Cousiño
- Paulette Sève as Florencia Alberti
- Nicolás Pérez as Gaspar Alberti
- Gloria Canales as Sonia

=== Guest cast ===
- Amparo Noguera as Camilo's psychologist
- Begoña Basauri as Loreto Sandoval
- Adriana Vacarezza as Isabel Cabunilas
- Francisco Ossa as Álex
- Yamila Reyna as Marisol
- Claudio Arredondo as Ítalo
- Teresa Hales as the news host

== Cultural references ==
- Among the first names that the telenovela was planning to use were "Buscando a Elisa" (Looking for Elisa), "Desaparecida" (Missing) and "Elisa".
- It is the first telenovela for Montserrat Prats, after her professional debut in the series Mi primera vez (My first time) and Aída, both from TVN.
- Katyna Huberman had to leave the cast due to her pregnancy.
- The role of Francisco Reyes was originally to be played by Julio Milostich, but after the scandal that he was involved with, casting came up with people like Luciano Cruz-Coke, Bastián Bodenhöfer and Reyes himself; the first one had a contract with Roos Film and the second one with Canal 13. Finally the role went to Reyes, who had expressed a really great attitude in participating in a late evening production from TVN.
- This will be the second time where Francisca Imboden and Álvaro Morales will be a couple in fiction, after they played a couple in Pampa Ilusión (Isidora and Melchor).
- The role of Cesar Caillet is a homosexual, who had an affair with the husband of his best friend.

== Remake ==
It was remade in Indonesia as Di Mana Melani?, the Philippines as Nasaan Ka, Elisa? and in India as Laut Aao Trisha.

== International Releases ==
- Top Channel (Albania) (January 4, 2010)
- Shant TV (Armenia)
- Farsi1 (Iran)
- Zone Romantica, Czech Republic (2010)
- Zone Romantica, Slovakia (2010)
- Zone Romantica, Serbia (2010)
- Zone Romantica, Croatia (2010)
- Zone Romantica, Slovenia (2010)
- Zone Romantica, Romania (2010)
- Zone Romantica, Bulgaria (2010, 2011)
- aTV, Turkey (2010)
- ABS-CBN, Philippines (2011)
- Studio 23, Philippines (2013)
- TVN, South Korea (2014)

== Curiosities ==
- The first few episodes were transmitted between the end of the News (24 Horas) and the beginning of the weather reports (TV Tiempo).
- In the Facebook-like page that Elisa was using, her mother tells authorities that a message appeared, this denotes two errors; first, no anonymous messages can be received on this site, since only registered users can send and receive messages; secondly, the message was sent by Elisa's profile itself, which means that she sent the message or somebody that knew her password.
- The supposed message from the "Facebook" account was sent with an IP address that starts with 68.xxx.xxx.xxx, while in Chile one could only use the format 200.xxx.xxx.xxx.
- The search engine that Francisca Correa was using, called "Search", utilizes the same format as Google.
- In the telenovela's debut, two episodes were transmitted back to back without commercial interruption.
- Paulette Sève and Christian Sève, who play cousins in the telenovela (Florencia and Sebastián) are siblings in real life.
- The newspaper called "El ciudadano", utilizes the same format as La Tercera.
- Starting on Monday, July 20, the slogan of the telenovela was changed from "A todos nos puede pasar" (It could happen to anyone) to "Mirando a través del mal" (Looking through evil eyes), this is because on episode 52 transmitted on the same day, the audience will know who the kidnapper is.
