= Consuelo Holzapfel =

Chilean actress

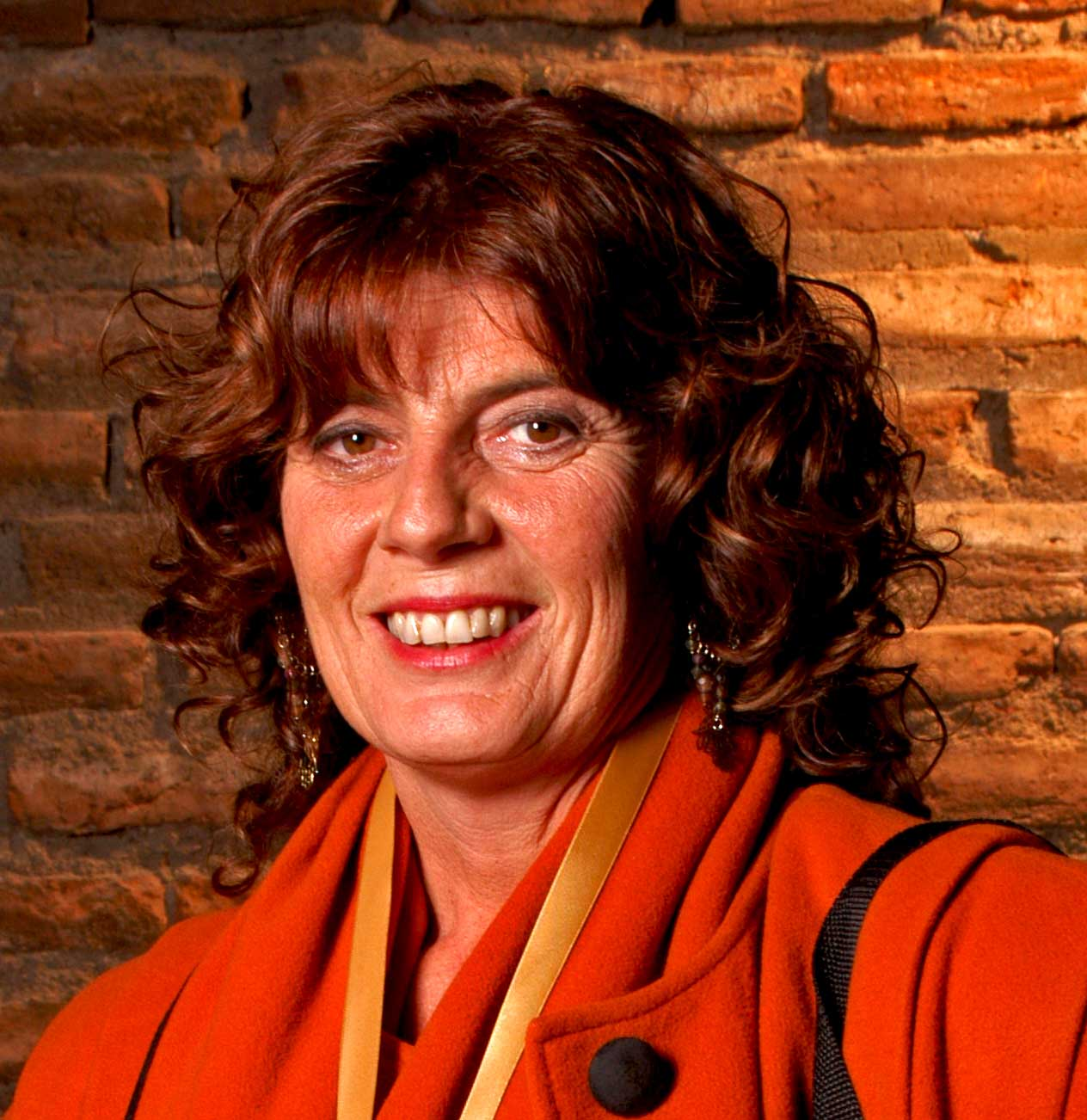
- Born: María Consuelo Holzapfel Ossa; March 27, 1956 (age 69); Valdivia, Chile
- Occupation: Actor
- Years active: 1974–present

María Consuelo Holzapfel Ossa (Valdivia, March 27, 1956) is a Chilean actress and theater director, known for her collaborations with the director Vicente Sabatini, and one of the most prominent actresses of the currently known as the golden age of telenovelas of Chilean television in the 1990s. She served as director of the theatre program at Universidad del Mar between 2004 and 2015.

== Filmography ==
=== Films ===
Película
Year	Title	Role	Notes
1987	Imagen latente	Laura	
1997	Sin miedo a la muerte	Marta	
2000	Coronación	Tenchita	voz
2002	Sangre Eterna	Madre de Carmila	directed by Jorge Olguín
2003	Subterra	Isidora Goyenechea Gallo	Papel principal: Nominación — Premio Altazor a la Mejor Actriz de cine
2004	Mónica, vida mía	Alejandrina	Película para televisión
2006	Rojo, la película	Carmen	
2007	Aguas milagrosas	Milagros	
2009	El vuelo del poeta	María Luisa Fernández	Película para televisión
2010	Metro cuadrado	La madre	
2010	Niebla	Teresa	
2011	Mejor no fumes	Sra. Arancibia	voz
2011	Patalos blancos	Isabel	Papel principal
2012	No	Ella misma	cameo
2012	Intimidar	Abuela	
2013	El paso del diablo	Doña Chelita	
2016	El paradero de las moscas		Papel principal
2016	Amapola Roja	Sofía del Campo	
2018	Calzones rotos	Alejandrina	Papel principal
2019	Mujeres arriba	Ximena Gutiérrez	
2020	Los Invitados	Teresa	Papel principal
2024	A Yard of Jackals		

=== Telenovelas ===
Telenovelas
Year	Title	Character	Channel
1978	El secreto de Isabel		TVN
1982	La gran mentira	Viviana Soler	TVN
1983	El juego de la vida	Pilar Ramírez	TVN
1985	Marta a las Ocho	Ana María Prado	TVN
1985	Morir de amor	Leticia Marín	TVN
1986	La dama del balcón	Carmen	TVN
1986	La Villa	Verónica Donoso	TVN
1989	A la sombra del ángel	Cristina Hudson	TVN
1990	El milagro de vivir	Clarisa Montes / Elsa Montes	TVN
1992	Trampas y caretas	Teresa Ríos	TVN
1993	Jaque mate	Érica Aguirre	TVN
1994	Rompecorazón	Rosemary Garay	TVN
1995	Estúpido cupido	Virginia Buzeta	TVN
1996	Sucupira	Elena Domínguez	TVN
1996	Loca piel	Gisela Bonfante	TVN
1997	Oro verde	Isabel Ugarte	TVN
1998	Iorana	Angélica Riroroko	TVN
1999	La Fiera	Gladys Cereceda	TVN
2000	Romané	Ofelia Lillo	TVN
2001	Pampa Ilusión	Asunción Echeñique	TVN
2002	El circo de las Montini	Violeta, profesora de Olga IV	TVN
2003	16	Sofía Arias	TVN
2004	Destinos cruzados	Gabriela Flaño	TVN
2005	17	Sofía Arias	TVN
2006	Entre medias	Silvia Contreras	TVN
2007	Corazón de María	Laura Cárdenas	TVN
2012	Reserva de familia	Sofía Guzmán	TVN
2016	Sres. Papis	Myriam Moreno	Mega
2017	Perdona nuestros pecados	Clemencia Valdeavellano	Mega
2019	Isla Paraíso	Sor Presagio	Mega

=== TV Series ===
Series
Year	Title	Character	Episodes	Channel
1989	Teresa de los Andes	Mercedes "Meche" Tagle	Reparto	TVN
1990	Corín Tellado	Carmen	1 episodio	TVN
1992	Estrictamente sentimental			TVN
1998–1999	Sucupira, la comedia	Elena Domínguez	Reparto	TVN
2001	Cuentos chilenos	Doña Facunda	1 episodio	TVN
2002	La vida es una lotería	Eliana	1 episodio	TVN
2002	Más que amigos	Madre de Andrea	Especial	Canal 13
2005	El día menos pensado	Edith	1 episodio	TVN
2006	Casado con hijos	Constanza "Cota"	1 episodio	Mega
2011–2014	Los archivos del cardenal	Julia Correa	Reparto	TVN
2012	El diario secreto de una profesional	María Cecilia Jeldres	Co-protagónico	TVN
2013	Lo que callamos las mujeres	Isidora	1 episodio	Chilevisión
2015	Los años dorados	Beatriz Lira	Protagónico	UCV
2015	Fabulosas Flores	Esposa de Ítalo		La Red
2016	Código Rosa	Marta	1 episodio	Mega
2018	Santiago Paranormal	Teresa	1 episodio	TVN
2020	La jauría	Mercedes Agüero	2 episodios	Amazon Prime Video
