= Pampa Ilusión =

- Genre: Telenovela
- Written by: Víctor Carrasco; Larissa Contreras; María José Galleguillos; Alexis Moreno
- Directed by: Vicente Sabatini
- Starring: Claudia di Girolamo; Francisco Reyes; Héctor Noguera; Delfina Guzmán; Francisco Melo; Tamara Acosta; Blanca Lewin; Juan Falcón; Amparo Noguera; Alfredo Castro; Francisca Imboden; Álvaro Morales
- Opening theme: "Y tenía un lunar" (Celia Gamez)
- Country of origin: Chile
- Original language: Spanish
- No. of episodes: 114

Original release
- Network: TVN

Pampa Ilusión is a Chilean telenovela produced by TVN. It was written by Víctor Carrasco, Larissa Contreras, María José Galleguillos and Alexis Moreno, and directed by Vicente Sabatini. It is considered part of the so-called Golden Age of Chilean telenovelas.

Set in the desolate interior of the Atacama Desert in 1934, and filmed on location in the Humberstone and Santa Laura Saltpeter Works, it classifies both as a historical romance and a working-class melodrama dealing with tyranny, classism and misogyny as principal motives, but given the wide array of characters there are substories centering on themes such as innocence, religious hypocrisy, unrequited love, narcissism, betrayal and prostitution.

The main setting is fictional company town whose existence is based entirely on the extraction of saltpeter. The price of saltpeter has declined both due to the effects of the ongoing Great Depression and the invention of synthetic alternatives, and the town faces economic decline and a threat to its existence. The despotic businessman William Clark refuses to accept that his economic prosperity has reached its end, while trying to locate and arrest his estranged daughter. He is searching for a woman, unaware that his daughter is crossdressing and that she uses a male identity in her career as a physician.

== Plot ==
The year is 1934. Deep in the Atacama Desert lies Pampa Ilusión, a company town dedicated to the extraction of saltpeter, a commodity that underwent a massive boom in previous decades, but which has sharply declined in price due to the Great Depression and the recent invention of synthetic alternatives. This has left Pampa Ilusión struggling to remain afloat as one of the few saltpeter works still in operation.

The owner of this office is Mr. William Clark (Héctor Noguera), an English-born, despotic and bed-ridden businessman who refuses to accept the end of his economic prosperity. The daily life and routine in the saltpeter mine is interrupted by the arrival of his daughter Inés (Claudia di Girolamo), a doctor, banished from the family along with her mother when she was a newborn. She will come to discover the reasons for the exile and humiliation suffered by her mother thirty years before. Alerted of Inés's arrival, Mr. Clark orders the arrest of any unknown women found within the office, which forces Inés to lead a double life: by day she disguises as a man, "Dr. Florencio Aguirre", under which identity she becomes Mr. Clark's personal physician and eventual confidant; And by night she covertly re-takes her true personality as Inés Clark.

Under the shadow of William lives Manuel (Francisco Melo), his son (and, unknowingly, younger brother of Inés), a weak and insecure man that spends his days trying to win the approval of his mentally abusive father and hide from him the near bankruptcy of the business.

Then there is José Miguel Inostroza (Francisco Reyes), Clark's security chief and right-hand man, an exemplary employee who follows Mr. Clark's orders blindly, even if the orders are harmful and abusive to the workers of Pampa Ilusion. His obedience is affected by the arrival of Inés, for whom he falls in love, Forcing him to choose between his loyalty and his principles.

Both as "Dr. Aguirre" and herself, Inés gets involved in the daily lives of the workers and management of the mine in the midst of the revolution against her father's oppressive rule, and slowly wins over the loyalty and friendship of the inhabitants both poor and wealthy. Among these are Clara Montes (Blanca Lewin), a wealthy socialite and feminist and Inés's primary confidant, and Alberto Quispe (Juan Falcón), Clara's secret lover and a Peruvian miner fighting discrimination against his own.

== Cast ==
=== Aristocracy ===
- Héctor Noguera as Mr. William Clark.
- Claudia di Girolamo as Inés Clark - Dr. Florencio Aguirre.
- Francisco Reyes as José Miguel Inostroza.
- Francisco Melo as Manuel Clark.
- Delfina Guzmán as Mercedes Jorquera.
- Luis Alarcón as Emilio Fuenzalida.
- Violeta Vidaurre as Amanda Jorquera.
- Eduardo Barril as Ángel Montes.
- Marés González as Elena Moncada.
- Alfredo Castro as Eulogio Martínez.
- Consuelo Holzapfel as Asunción Echeñique.
- Francisca Imboden as Isidora Fuenzalida.
- Blanca Lewin as Clara Montes.
- Antonia Zegers as Carmen Montes.
- Álvaro Espinoza as Ricardo Fuenzalida.
- Ricardo Fernández as Maximiliano Subercaseaux.

=== Inhabitants ===
- Tamara Acosta as Clementina Paita.
- Álvaro Morales as Melchor López - Gaspar López.
- Juan Falcón as Alberto Quispe.
- Amparo Noguera as Elisa Pereira.
- Néstor Cantillana as Tobías Pincheira.
- Claudia Cabezas as María Paita.
- Claudio González as Rómulo Verdugo.
- José Soza as Ivo Yutronic.
- Luz Jiménez as Lourdes Santana.
- Ximena Rivas as Julia Méndez.
- Pablo Schwarz as Serafin Gálvez.
- Erto Pantoja as Aparicio Meza.
- Óscar Hernández as Tomás Navarro.
- Carmen Disa Gutiérrez as Domitila Faúndez.
- Rodrigo Pérez as Arsenio Valle.
- Roxana Campos as Laura Fortuna.
- Sergio Hernández as Benito Valencia.
- Alessandra Guerzoni as Miss Emily Thomas Scott.
- Mauricio Inzunza as Carlos González.
- Daniela Lhorente as Libertad Navarro.
- Felipe Ríos as Luciano Pereira.
- María José Necochea as Esperanza Mardones.
- Eduardo Soto as Macario Ortega.
- Mireya Véliz as Bristela Monardes.
- Héctor Aguilar as Mario Weng.
