= Álvaro Morales (actor) =

Chilean actor

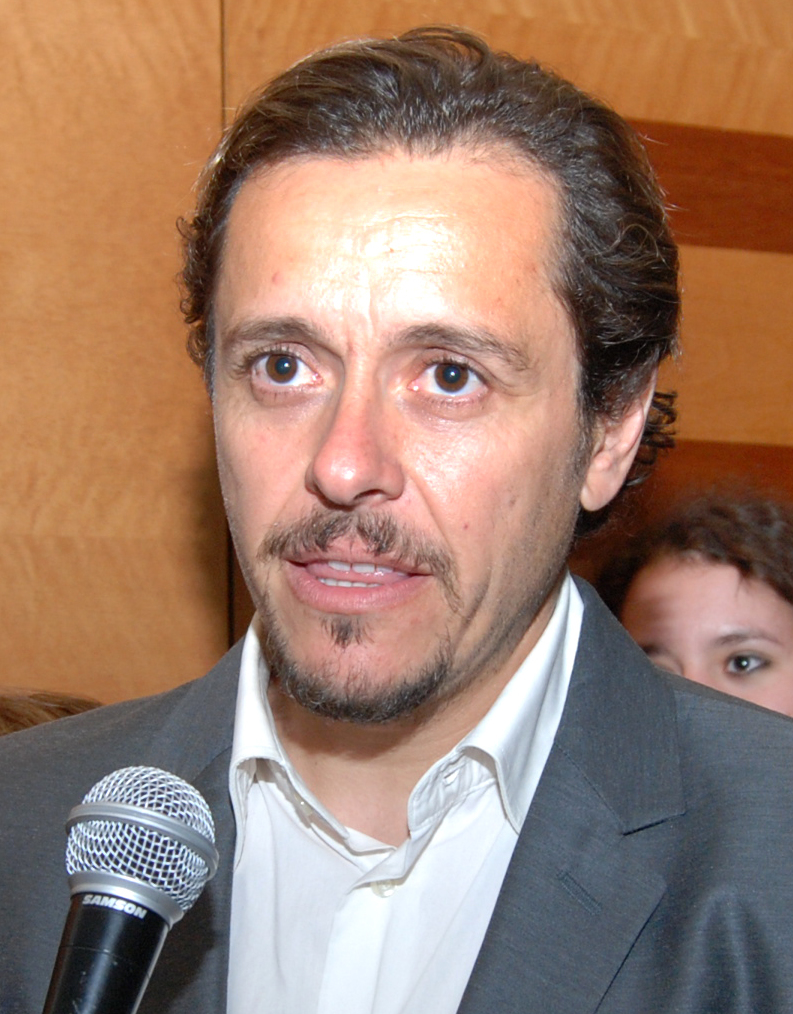
- Morales in 2010
- Born: September 14, 1968 (age 57); Santiago, Chile
- Occupation: Actor
- Years active: 1990–present

Álvaro Enrique Morales Rojas (born Santiago, September 14, 1968) is a Chilean theater and television actor. For his interpretations, he has been the recipient of several awards, among them being the winner of an APES for best leading actor for his role as Martín Ortúzar in the telenovela Los Pincheira.

== Career ==
He attended the Fernando González Theater Club, where together with Marcelo Leonart – his friend from school – he founded the Merri Melodys theater company. It was also there that Verónica Saquel and María Eugenia Rencoret discovered him and offered him a supporting role in the television series Ámame in 1993. Some of his most recognized collaborations are those with the director Vicente Sabatini, among them the box office hit Rompecorazón (1994), Estúpido Cupido (1995), Sucupira (1996) and its sequel Sucupira, la comedia (1998), Oro Verde (1997), Iorana (1998), La Fiera (1999), Romané (2000), Pampa Ilusión (2001), El circo de las Montini (2002), Los Pincheira (2004), among others.

In 2004, Morales played Martín Ortúzar, the antagonist of Los Pincheira, an evil and powerful landowner who owns most of the land in the area. Faced with his choice as an antagonist, Morales declared: "We are actors by trade and profession, and for the same reason any of us who are can be in the main roles. That is why I think that director Vicente Sabatini chose me for the casting, for my age and the closeness that my appearance provokes with who will be my partner and antagonist." For his performance, Morales received critical acclaim and received the APES award in the category of "Best Television Actor". Morales was widely recognized for his performance in the drama ¿Donde está Elisa? (2009). He played Ignacio Cousiño, a conservative man and family man. However, he hides his homosexuality from his family until an old friend of his wife returns – played by César Caillet – with whom he maintained a parallel relationship in his youth. In that same year, he had a sporadic 8-episode participation in Los Exitosos Pells (2009), where he shared roles with Luz Valdivieso, Ricardo Fernández and Claudia Di Girolamo. In 2011, he portrayed the drug trafficker Lucio Santo Domingo in Infiltradas (2011). In the drama he played the main antagonist, and his performance received several positive reviews from critics of Chilean television and entertainment. The character is an antihero, because in the past they did him a lot of damage, living in a very aggressive environment in which he responds in the same way. He also declared "Lucio is a very well written character." In the production, he shared credits with Héctor Noguera, Katty Kowaleczko, Felipe Braun, Mayte Rodríguez and Tiago Correa. At the same time, he was a member of the international jury of the Viña del Mar International Song Festival.

== Filmography ==
=== Film ===
Películas
Año	Película	Rol	Director
2000	Ángel Negro	Gabriel Echeverría	Jorge Olguín
2010	Qué pena tu vida	Diego	Nicolás López

=== Telenovelas ===
Teleseries
Año	Teleserie	Personaje	Rol	Director	Canal
1993	Ámame	Ignacio Ricalde	Secundario	María Eugenia Rencoret	TVN
1994	Rompecorazón	Matías Sullivan	Secundario	Vicente Sabatini	TVN
1995	Estúpido Cupido	Ricardo Campino	Secundario	Vicente Sabatini	TVN
1996	Sucupira	Raimundo «Rucio» Prado	Secundario	Vicente Sabatini	TVN
1997	Oro verde	Alonso Durán	Secundario	Vicente Sabatini	TVN
1998	Iorana	Cristián «Iriti» Balbontín	Protagónico	Vicente Sabatini	TVN
1999	La Fiera	Andrés Cárdenas	Co-protagónico	Vicente Sabatini	TVN
2000	Romané	Rodrigo Cordero	Antagónico	Vicente Sabatini	TVN
2001	Pampa Ilusión	Melchor López / Gaspar López	Co-protagónico	Vicente Sabatini	TVN
2002	El circo de las Montini	Luis «Lucho» Rubio	Co-protagónico	Vicente Sabatini	TVN
2003	Puertas adentro	Matías Rivera	Antagónico	Vicente Sabatini	TVN
2004	Los Pincheira	Martín Ortúzar	Antagónico	Vicente Sabatini	TVN
2005	Los Capo	Adriano Urbini	Co-protagónico	Vicente Sabatini	TVN
2006	Cómplices	Mario Zamora	Co-protagónico	Vicente Sabatini	TVN
2007	Corazón de María	Gonzalo Montes	Secundario	Vicente Sabatini	TVN
2008	Viuda alegre	Yagán Vivanco	Secundario	Vicente Sabatini	TVN
2009	Los exitosos Pells	Gianluca Paldini	Participación Especial	Germán Barriga	TVN
2009	¿Dónde está Elisa?	Ignacio Cousiño	Co-protagónico	Rodrigo Velásquez	TVN
2010	Mujeres de lujo	Clemente Figueroa	Protagónico	Patricio González	Chilevisión
2011	Infiltradas	Lucio Santo Domingo	Protagónico	Patricio González	Chilevisión
2012	La Sexóloga	Gabriel Hidalgo	Protagónico	Vicente Sabatini	Chilevisión
2013	Socias	Pablo Ventura	Co-protagónico	Patricio González	TVN
2015	Eres mi tesoro	Álvaro Cummings	Protagónico	Nicolás Alemparte	Mega
2016	Ámbar	Cristóbal Moler	Antagónico	Felipe Arratia	Mega
2018	Casa de muñecos	José Luis Hurtado	Protagónico	Patricio González	Mega
2019	Río Oscuro	Fernando García	Participación Especial	Cristián Mason	Canal 13
