= Eres mi tesoro =

- Genre: Telenovela
- Created by: Yusef Rumie
- Written by: Pablo Riquelme; Francisco Bobadilla; Luis Ponce; Rosario Valenzuela; Isabel Budinish
- Directed by: Nicolás Alemparte; Manuel Buch
- Creative director: María Eugenia Rencoret
- Starring: María José Bello; Álvaro Morales; Felipe Contreras; Viviana Rodríguez; César Caillet; Celine Raymond; Loreto Valenzuela; Teresita Reyes; Edgardo Bruna
- Opening theme: "Mi Tesoro" by Jesse & Joy
- Country of origin: Chile
- Original language: Spanish
- No. of seasons: 1
- No. of episodes: 171

Production
- Executive producers: Daniela Demicheli; Pablo Ávila
- Producer: Cecilia Aguirre
- Camera setup: Multi-camera
- Production companies: Mega; AGTV Producciones

Original release
- Network: Mega
- Release: July 29, 2015 – April 6, 2016

Eres mi tesoro (English: You Are My Treasure) is a Chilean telenovela created by Yusef Rufie, that premiered on Mega on July 29, 2015 and ended on April 6, 2016. It stars María José Bello, Álvaro Morales and Felipe Contreras.

== Cast ==
- María José Bello as Julieta Lizama
- Álvaro Morales as Álvaro Cummings
- Felipe Contreras as Juan Riquelme
- Viviana Rodríguez as Carolina Ruiz
- César Caillet as Rodrigo Pezoa
- Teresita Reyes as Delia Contreras
- Loreto Valenzuela as Gabriela Aldunate
- Dayana Amigo as Susana "Susy" Pizarro
- Edgardo Bruna as Ángel Riquelme
- Celine Reymond as Bernardita Cummings
- Pedro Vicuña as Jorge "El Tigre" Pizarro
- Etienne Bobenrieth as Ricardo "Richi" Pizarro
- Constanza Araya as Marión Lizama
- Ricardo Vergara as Benjamín Cummings Ruiz
- Félix Villar as "El Flash"
- Isidora Guzmán as Alma Lizama
- Teresa Münchmeyer as Rodrigo's mother
- Max Meriño as Carolina's doctor
- Luz María Yacometti as Beatriz, Carolina's nurse

== Ratings ==
Season	Episodes	First aired		Last aired		Average
Season	Episodes	Date	Rating	Date	Rating	Average
1	171	July 29, 2015	22	April 6, 2016	19	14.8
