= Francisco Reyes Morandé =

Chilean actor

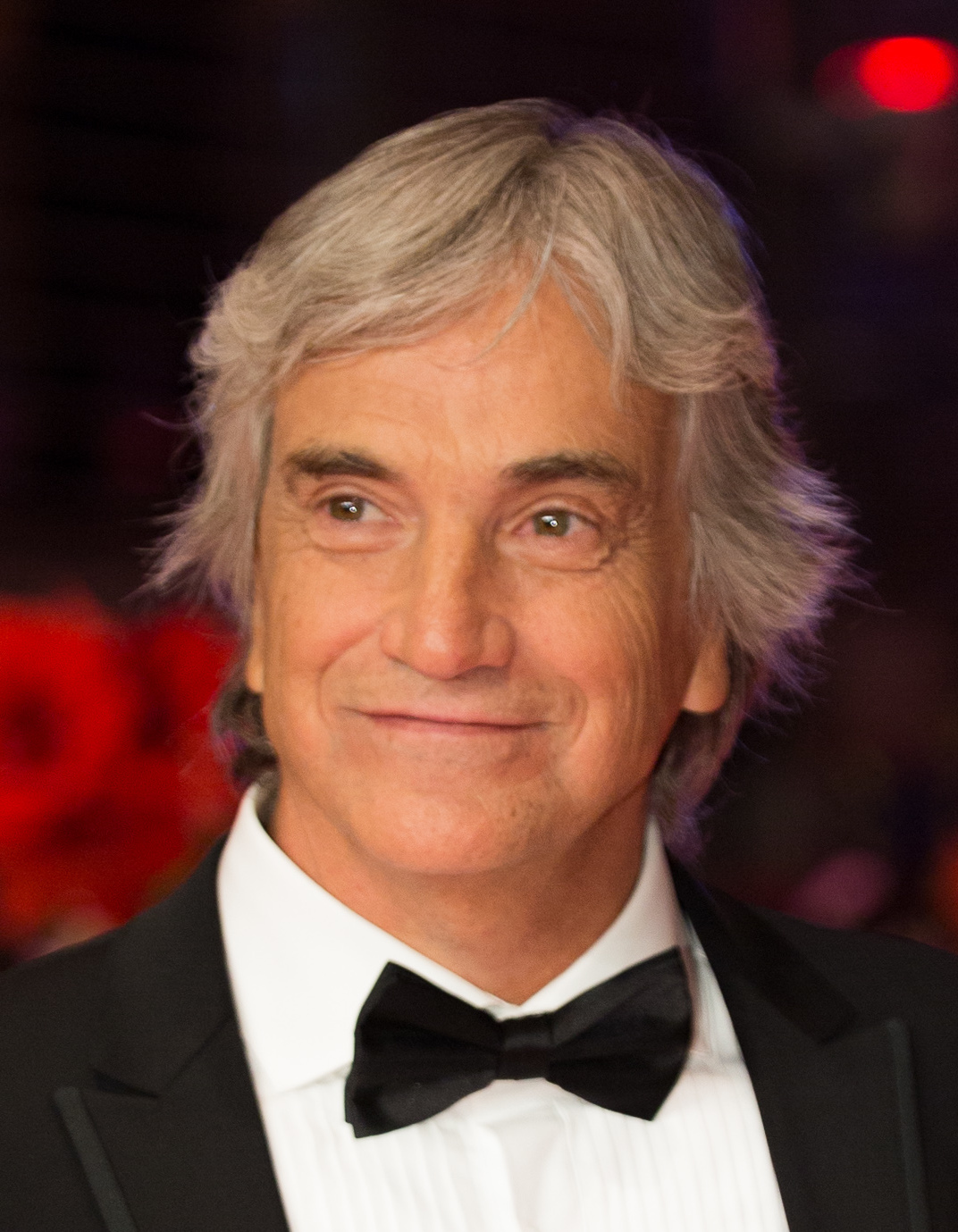
- Francisco Reyes at the Berlinale 2017
- Born: Eugenio Francisco Reyes Morandé; July 6, 1954 (age 71); Santiago, Chile
- Occupation: Actor
- Years active: 1989 – present
- Spouse: Carmen Romero (m. 1987)
- Children: 5

Eugenio Francisco Reyes Morandé (born July 6, 1954, in Santiago) is a Chilean television, theatre and film actor.

He made his debut in the year 1989 in the series Sor Teresa de Los Andes on TVN. Notable performances include those with Chilean actress Claudia di Girolamo. Francisco has married to Carmen Romero since 1987 and has five children. In 2007 he appeared in the TVN program El Baile and he won the competition.

In 2017 he gained international recognition for his role as Orlando, the older boyfriend of Marina (Daniela Vega) in Sebastián Lelio's Oscar-winning film A Fantastic Woman.

== Filmography ==
Films
Year	Film	Character	Notes
1988	Ángeles	Juan Segovia	
1990	La Telenovela Errante (released in 2017)		
1990	Hay Algo allá Afuera	Daniel	
1996	Mi Último Hombre	Álvaro	
1997	Docteur Chance	Georg Trakl	
1998	Enemigo de mi Enemigo	Pascal	
1999	Diplomatic Siege		
2001	Muertes a Medianoche	Engineer #2	
2003	Buscando à la Señorita Hyde	Bruno Delmas	
2003	Subterra	Fernando Gutierrez	
2003	The Chosen One	Patricio	
2004	Machuca	Patricio Infante	
2004	Days in the Country	Dr. Chadian	
2008	Secrets	Dr. Liborio	
2015	The Club	Father Alfonso	
2016	Neruda	Bianchi	
2017	A Fantastic Woman	Orlando Onetto Partier	
2023	El vacío	Him	
Telenovelas
Year	Soap opera	Character	Channel
1990	El Milagro de Vivir	Ricardo Gomez	TVN
1991	Volver a Empezar	Martín Barnes	TVN
1992	Trampas y Caretas	Max Cruchaga	TVN
1993	Jaque Mate	Nicolas Belmar	TVN
1994	Rompecorazón	Pablo Sierra	TVN
1995	Estúpido Cupido	Jaime Salvatierra	TVN
1996	Sucupira	Esteban Onetto	TVN
1997	Oro Verde	Diego Valenzuela	TVN
1998	Iorana	Fernando Balbontin / Dr. Arístides Concha / Antoine Dumond	TVN
1999	La Fiera	Martin Echaurren	TVN
2000	Romané	Father Juan Bautista Domínguez	TVN
2001	Pampa Ilusión	Jose Miguel Inostroza	TVN
2003	Puertas Adentro	Jose Cardenas	TVN
2004	Los Pincheira	Miguel Molina Linares	TVN
2005	Los Capo	Giorgio Capo Ragianni	TVN
2006	Cómplices	Harvey Slater	TVN
2007	Corazón de María	Father Mateo Garcia	TVN
2008	Viuda Alegre	Santiago Balmaceda / Simon Diaz	TVN
2009	¿Dónde está Elisa?	Bruno Alberti	TVN
2010	Conde Vrolok	Froilan Donoso	TVN
2011	El Laberinto de Alicia	Manuel Inostroza	TVN
2012	Pobre Rico	Maximo Cotapos	TVN
2014	Vuelve temprano	Santiago Goycolea	TVN
2015	Matriarcas	Gary Mendez	TVN
2017	Dime Quien Fue	Manuel Silva	TVN
2018	Amar a morir	Nicolas Vidal	TVN
2019	Yo soy Lorenzo	Ernesto Orellana	Mega
2022	Secretos de Familia	Octavio Cruchaga	Canal 13
2022	La ley de Baltazar	Baltazar Rodríguez	Mega
2023	Generación 98	Arturo Bulnes	Mega
2024	Secretos de familia	Octavio Cruchaga	Canal 13
2024	Los Casablanca	Raimundo Casablanca	Mega
TV Series
Year	Serie	Character	Channel
1989	Santa Teresa de Los Andes	Miguel Fernández	TVN
1997	Sucupira, la comedia	Esteban Onetto	TVN
2002	La Vida es una Lotería	Cap. Lóco por Déborah	TVN
2011-2013	Prófugos	Óscar Salamanca	HBO

== Theatre ==
- El Tony chico
- Historia de la sangre (1991–1992)
- Patas de perro 2000
- Enrique por Lhin 2001
- Eva Perón 2002
- El Campo 2004
- Dejála Sangrar 2005
- Copenhague 2006
- Criminal 2007
- Filotas 2007
- Pancho Villa 2008
