= Amparo Noguera =

Chilean actress

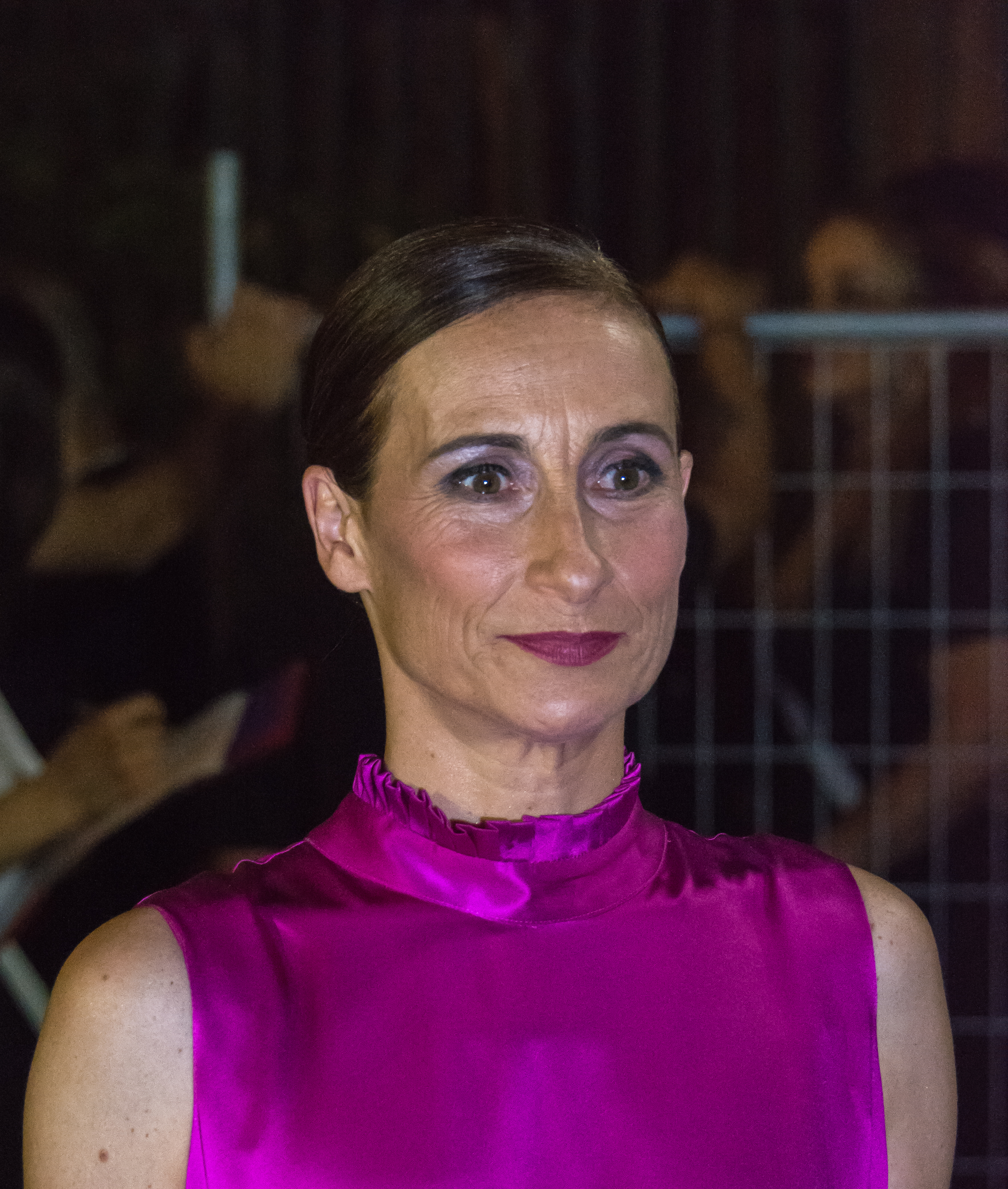
- Noguera in 2019
- Born: María Amparo Noguera Portales; Santiago, Chile
- Education: Pontifical Catholic University of Chile
- Occupations: Actress, Theatre director
- Years active: 1988–present
- Spouse: Marcelo Alonso

María Amparo Noguera Portales is a Chilean television, theatre and film actress and theatre director.

== Early life and education ==
María Amparo Noguera Portales is the daughter of the actor Héctor Noguera Illanes and Isidora Portales. Her grandfather, Héctor Noguera Prieto was descendant of the former President of Chile José Joaquín Prieto Vial and her mother is descendant of Diego Portales, Chilean politician of Basque descent.

Noguera studied acting at Pontificia Universidad Católica de Chile and the Escuela de Teatro Imagen.

Her half-sister, Emilia is also an actress.

== Career ==
Noguera is one of the most recognized actresses in Chile. She is best known for the films El Ciclista de San Cristóbal, El País de Octubre and Mi Último Hombre.

She won the Altazar Award for best actress for her role in Un Ladrón y su Mujer.

In 2009 Noguera appeared in the TV series ¿Dónde está Elisa? as Amanda Goldstein.

== Filmography ==
=== Film roles ===
Year	Film	Role	Notes
1988	Der Radfahrer von San Cristóbal	Amparo	
1988	Ángeles	Claudia	
1990	El país de octubre		
1992	Archipiélago		
1996	Mi último hombre	Rosalia	
2001	Un ladrón y su mujer	Ana Lopez	Altazor Award of the National Arts for Best Actress on Cinema
2002	Tres noches de un sábado	Victoria	
2004	Days in the Country	Miss Chazal / Rosita Renard	
2006	Padre nuestro	Meche	
2007	Casa de remolienda	Nicolasa	
2007	Life Kills Me	Margarita	
2007	Radio Corazón	Maria Pilar	PAOA Award for the Best Actress on Movie
2008	Secretos	Judge Vilma	
2008	Tony Manero	Cony	
2010	Post Mortem	Sandra	
2012	Las mujeres de Neruda	Laura Reyes	
2012	No	Psychologist	Nominated for the Academy Award for Best Foreign Language Film
2013	Carne de perro	Laura	
2014	Desastres naturales	Lucia	Post-production
2014	Hotel Valdivia		Post-production
2014	Aurora	Sofia	Post-production
2017	A Fantastic Woman	Adriana Cortés	
2020	Jailbreak Pact	Fabiola Pizarro	
2020	My Tender Matador	Doña Olguita	
2021	(Im)Patient	Milena Fariña	
2022	Blanquita	Piedad	
2023	History and Geography	Gioconda Martínez	

=== Soap opera roles ===
Year	Title	Role	Notes	Director
1989	La Intrusa	Texia Gonzalez	Main role	Cristián Mason
1990	Te Conte?	Antonieta	Supporting role	Óscar Rodríguez Gingins
1991	Ellas por Ellas	Ema Pereira	Supporting role	Ricardo Vicuña
1994	Champaña	Verónica Valdes	Main role	Cristián Mason
1994	Rojo y Miel	Lucia Castellanos	Supporting role	Quena Rencoret
1995	Estúpido Cupido	Marta Davis	Supporting role	Vicente Sabatini
1996	Sucupira	Norma Ordenes	Supporting role	Vicente Sabatini
1997	Oro Verde	Adela Moraga	Supporting role	Vicente Sabatini
1998	Iorana	Ingrid Astudillo	Supporting role	Vicente Sabatini
1999	La Fiera	Rosita Espejo	Supporting role	Vicente Sabatini
2000	Romané	Maria Magdalena	Supporting role	Vicente Sabatini
2001	Pampa Ilusión	Elisa Pereira	Supporting role	Vicente Sabatini
2002	El Circo de las Montini	Olga III Montini	Supporting role	Vicente Sabatini
2003	Puertas Adentro	Monica Barrera	Main role	Vicente Sabatini
2004	Los Pincheira	Luisa Sotomayor	Supporting role	Vicente Sabatini
2005	Los Capo	Concetta Esposito	Main role	Vicente Sabatini
2006	Cómplices	Rita Cifuentes	Supporting role	Vicente Sabatini
2007	Corazón de María	Dalila Peñafiel	Main role	Vicente Sabatini
2007	Alguien Te Mira	Maria Gracia Carpenter	4 episodes	Germán Barriga
2008	Viuda Alegre	Kathy Meneses	Supporting role	Vicente Sabatini
2009	Los Exitosos Pells	Lily Tokmann	Supporting role	Germán Barriga
2009	¿Dónde está Elisa?	Amanda Goldstein	16 episodes	Rodrigo Velásquez
2010	Martín Rivas	Engracia Encina	Supporting role	Germán Barriga
2011	El Laberinto de Alicia	Sofia Andrade	Supporting role	Rodrigo Velásquez
2012	Pobre Rico	Virginia Cotapos	Main role	Rodrigo Velásquez
2014	Vuelve temprano	Clara Goycolea	Main Role	Víctor Huerta
2015	La Poseída	Mother Juana	Supporting role	Víctor Huerta
2016	El Camionero	Rosita Saldívar	2 episodes	Ítalo Galleani
2017	Dime Quién Fue	Agustina Lyon	Main Role	Germán Barriga
2019	Río Oscuro	Clara Molina	Main Role	Cristián Mason
2022	La ley de Baltazar	Margarita Fuentes	Main Role	Nicolas Alemparte
2024	Nuevo amores de mercado	Maitén García		Nicolas Alemparte

=== TV series roles ===
Year	Title	Role	Notes
1996	The Buhardilla	Anita	Supporting role
1997	Sussi's Stories	Teresa	1 episode
1997	Scorpion Brigade	Angelica	1 episode
1998-1999	Sucupira, The Comedy	Norma Órdenes	Supporting role
1999	The Lizana's	Rosita Espejo	Main role
2011-2013	Fugitives	Natalia Ricci "The Red"	Supporting role
2015	Zamudio: Lost at Night	Marcela	Supporting role; 2 episodes
2020	The Pack	Maria Rivera	Supporting role
2021	No Nos Quieren Ver	Javiera Rojas	Supporting role; 6 episodes
2022	The Prisoners	Ida Rios	Supporting role
2022	42 Days of Darkness	Nora Figueroa	Supporting role
2023	Chromosome 21	Judge	Supporting role
2023	Star Wars: Visions	Officer (voice)	1 episode

== Theatre ==
- Ardiente Paciencia
- Diálogo de Fin de Siglo
- La Manzana de Adán
- Historias de Sangre
- Los Días Tuertos
- Dédalo en el Vientre de la Bestia
- El Paseo de Buster Keaton
- ´´Hechos Consumados´´
- La Gaviota (Melodrama Del Fracaso)
- Numancia
- Infamante Electra
- Casa de Muñecas
- Las Brutas
