= Sres. Papis (Chilean TV series) =

- Genre: Telenovela
- Based on: Sres. Papis by Marcela Guerty and Pamela Rementería
- Written by: Rodrigo Cuevas; Ximena Carrera; Nicolás Wellmann; Isabel Budinich; José Fonseca
- Directed by: Patricio González; Javier Cabieses
- Starring: Francisco Melo; Jorge Zabaleta; Simón Pesutic
- Opening theme: "We Built This City" by Starship
- Country of origin: Chile
- Original language: Spanish
- No. of seasons: 1
- No. of episodes: 144

Production
- Executive producer: Patricio López
- Producer: Claudia Cazanave
- Camera setup: Multi-camera
- Production company: Mega

Original release
- Network: Mega
- Release: June 28, 2016 – March 6, 2017

Sres. Papis is a Chilean telenovela based on the Argentine telenovela of the same name. It premiered on Mega on June 28, 2016 and ended on March 6, 2017. It stars Francisco Melo, Jorge Zabaleta and Simón Pesutic.

The series revolves around three fathers who meet daily at the entrance of their children's kindergarten and touches topics such as friendship, parent-child relationship, love conflicts and changing social roles.

== Plot ==
Ignacio Moreno is a successful business executive, who likes to live a life of luxury, surrounded by women and is not interested in compromising. One day someone rings the bell of his apartment. Karina Urrutia, an old love, reveals to Ignacio that he is Johnny's dad. Karina decides to escape, however, Ignacio chases her but he is hit by Ema Díaz. As the days go by, Ignacio takes his son to school and gets a surprise, the teacher is the same woman who almost ran him over. At the school he meets two other parents. Julián Álvarez is a young father, who while working in his fast-food truck with his son Lucas, his in-laws suddenly appear. The father of his late girlfriend, Alberto Echeñique, along with his wife Ensenada Zúñiga, threatens him and tells him that he will do whatever it takes to take away Lucas, since he believes they will take better care of him. Fernando Pereira is a disoriented father who has found love after a separation. After doing his vegetable dance, Julián is visited by the police who want to take custody of his son to what he refuses. In addition, Ignacio and Fernando provoke the police, so the three parents end up in prison. After this meeting, the fathers start a strong friendship and must face new challenges and risks they may have.

== Cast ==
- Francisco Melo as Fernando Pereira
- Jorge Zabaleta as Ignacio Moreno
- Simón Pesutic as Julián Álvarez
- María Gracia Omegna as Emma Díaz
- Francisca Imboden as Maricarmen Riveros
- Francisca Walker as Valentina Salamanca
- Diego Muñoz as Gustavo Olavarría
- Katyna Huberman as Paula Rosende
- Maricarmen Arrigorriaga as María Teresa Velasco
- Hernán Lacalle as Alberto Echeñique
- Rodrigo Muñoz as Benito Soto "Sotito"
- Claudio Arredondo as Benni Velasco
- Eduardo Barril as Álvaro Salamanca
- Solange Lackington as Guacolda Olavarría
- Antonia Giesen as Verónica Echeñique
- Paula Luchsinger as Ignacia Pereira
- Li Fridman as Ensenada Zúñiga
- Constanza Mackenna as Antonia Fernández
- Ignacio Massa as Vicente Zúñiga
- Diego Guerrero as Johnny Moreno
- Hellen Mrugalski as Sofía Pereira
- Beltrán Izquierdo as Lucas Álvarez
- Pelusa Troncoso as Carmen Flores
- Lorena Capetillo as Karina Urrutia
- Consuelo Holzapfel as Myriam Moreno
- Julio Milostich as Eduardo "Lalo" Bachi
- Viviana Rodríguez as Blanca Harris
- Gabriela Hernández as María Elena "Nena" Larrondo
- Felipe Castro as Bernardo Salamanca
- Álvaro Espinoza as Tomás Ovalle
- Ingrid Cruz as Francisca Ferrada
- Carmen Gloria Bresky as Cecilia "Chechi" Agüero
- María José Necochea as María José Montalba
- Felipe Contreras as Marcos Meléndez
- Francisco Puelles as Rafael Miranda
- Nicolás Oyarzún as Joaquín Cantillana
- Matías Gil as Gonzalo "El Rana" Elizalde
- Mireya Sotoconil as Mónica Díaz
- Seide Costa as Salomé Vélez
- Jacqueline Boudon as Berta Mardones
- Héctor Aguilar as Emilio Quiroz
- Paulina Hunt as Inés Soto
- Patricia Irribarra as Lissette
- Pablo Striano as Doctor Cárdenas
- Luz María Yacometti as Gilda Bejarano

== Ratings ==
Season	Episodes	First aired		Last aired		Average
Season	Episodes	Date	Rating	Date	Rating	Average
1	144	June 28, 2016	24.8	March 6, 2017	37.2	24.1
