= Sergio Hernández (actor) =

Chilean actor

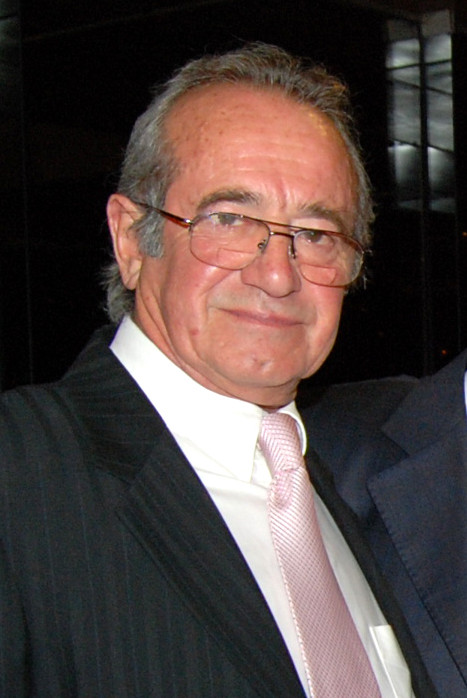
- Born: 27 April 1945 (age 79); Arica, Chile
- Years active: 1971–present
- Children: 4

Sergio Fernando Hernández Albrecht (born 27 April 1945) is a Chilean actor. He has performed in more than sixty films since 1971. Due to the coup Hernández left Chile in 1973 and worked in film and theater in Europe. He returned to Chile in 1986.

== Selected filmography ==
Film
Year	Title	Role	Notes
1975	Dialogues of Exiles	Fabián Luna	
1991	Amelia Lópes O'Neill	Igor	
1991	The Frontier		
1993	Johnny cien pesos		
1998	Takilleitor		
2007	Fiestapatria	Don Álvaro	
2009	Dawson Isla 10		
2011	The Year of the Tiger		
2012	Night Across the Street	Celso Robles	
2012	No		
2013	Gloria	Rodolfo	
2015	In the Grayscale	Toto	
2016	You'll Never Be Alone	Juan	
2017	A Fantastic Woman		
2017	And Suddenly the Dawn		

TV
Year	Title	Role	Notes
1997	Oro verde		
1998	Iorana		
1999	Aquelarre		
2000	Romané		
2001	Pampa Ilusión		
2011	La Doña		
2012-2014	El Reemplazante		
