= (Im)Patient =

- Theatrical release poster
- Directed by: Constanza Fernández Bertrand
- Screenplay by: Constanza Fernández Bertrand
- Based on: El pa(de)ciente: La medicina cuestionada by Miguel Kottow
- Produced by: Constanza Fernández Bertrand; Roberto Doveris
- Starring: Héctor Noguera
- Cinematography: Cristián Petit-Laurent
- Edited by: Soledad Salfate; Sylvana Squiciarini
- Music by: Ángela Acuña
- Production companies: Celosa Productions; Niña Niño Films; Fundación PACUAR
- Release dates: October 9, 2021 (BIFF); May 12, 2022 (Chile)
- Running time: 108 minutes
- Country: Chile
- Language: Spanish

(Im)Patient (Spanish: El pa(de)ciente) is a 2021 Chilean drama film written and directed by Constanza Fernández Bertrand. It is based on the book El pa(de)ciente: La medicina cuestionada by Miguel Kottow. Starring Héctor Noguera accompanied by Amparo Noguera, Naldy Hernández, Emilia Noguera, Diego Casanueva, Daniel Muñoz, Paola Giannini and Gabriela Aguilera.

== Synopsis ==
After being diagnosed with a syndrome that progressively paralyzes his entire body, Sergio Graf will fight to take an active role in his healing, this time as a patient and not as a doctor. This is the journey of his bodily deterioration, the loss of his security, and the opportunity to reconcile with his closest environment: his family.

== Cast ==
The actors participating in this film are:

- Héctor Noguera as Sergio Graf
- Amparo Noguera as Milena Fariña
- Naldy Hernández as Nora
- Emilia Noguera as Tisca Graf
- Diego Casanueva as Javier Graf
- Daniel Muñoz as Boris
- Paola Giannini as Fisiatra
- Gabriela Aguilera as Dr. Vásquez

== Production ==
Principal photography took place in three hospitals in Chile between October and December 2019.

== Release ==
(Im)Patient had its world premiere on October 9, 2021, at the Busan International Film Festival. It was commercially released on May 12, 2022, in Chilean theaters.

== Reception ==
=== Critical reception ===
Paula Bustamante from Bitácora de Cine favorably criticizes the film's story, which becomes very crude, but there are moments very well achieved for acid humor, managing to move the viewer. Ana Catalina Castillo from Culturizarte highlights the film's ability to make the viewer identify with the main character, although it can become overexplanatory at times. Carolina Benavente from El Agente Cine wrote: "(Im)patient is suggestive and accomplished, serious and playful at the same time, with few potholes that betray a kind of craftsmanship linked to what has already been described."

=== Accolades ===
Year	Award / Festival	Category	Recipient	Result	Ref.
2021	Huelva Ibero-American Film Festival	Silver Colon - Audience Award	Constanza Fernández & Roberto Doveris	Won	
2022	Buenos Aires International Festival of Independent Cinema	International Competition - Best Film	Constanza Fernández & Roberto Doveris	Nominated	
2023	Caleuche Awards	Best Leading Actor	Héctor Noguera	Won	
2023	Caleuche Awards	Best Supporting Actress	Paola Giannini	Won	
2023	Caleuche Awards	Best Supporting Actress	Amparo Noguera	Nominated	
2023	Caleuche Awards	Best Supporting Actress	Naldy Hernández	Nominated	
