= Néstor Cantillana =

Chilean actor

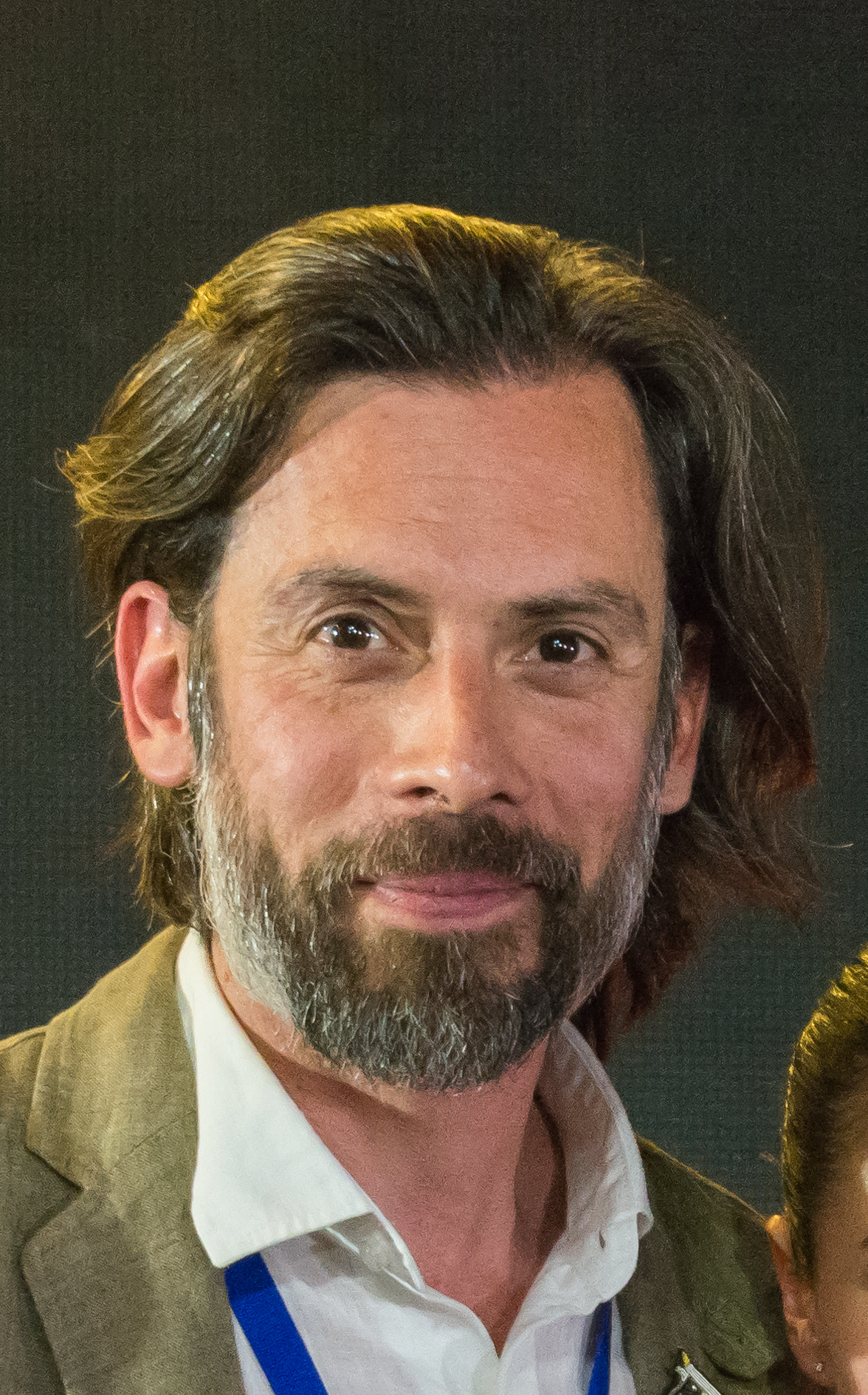
- Born: Néstor Igor Cantillana; July 19, 1975 (age 50); Santiago, Chile
- Occupation: Actor
- Political party: Democratic Revolution
- Partner: Macarena Teke
- Children: 2

Néstor Igor Cantillana (born July 19, 1975 in Santiago) is a Chilean actor in theater, movies and TV.

== Life and career ==
Cantillana's grandmother was a communist and later she practiced the evangelic religion and he grew up under that doctrine until 12 years old in Curicó. He used to play the piano in the local church. He studied in the theater academy of Fernando González.

Since 1994 he has participated in theater work such as Historia de la Sangre (1995), Calígula (1998), Hamlet (2000) and La Herencia (2000).

In 1995, Cantillana traveled to the Canadian city of Montreal with the play "Historia de la Sangre". The following year, 1996, he participated in the same play in Berlin, a city where he would return that same year with the play La misión. In 1998, the actor would return to Germany to present the same play in Munich, Bonn and Stuttgart.

In 1996, Cantillana received the award for best actor for his role in the play Despertar de Primavera, presented in the third Nuevas Tendencias Teatrales festival.

He made his debut in the telenovela world in the role of Patricio Tepano in Iorana (1998) from TVN, he then performed some other characters, among them, an AIDS victim, a common employee, a frustrated detective and a young homosexual doctor.

Cantillana was nominated for an Altazor Award for his role in the soap opera Romané and he won the APES award as the best actor in the year 2000.

He had the protagonist role in the TVN soap opera, Corazón de María (2007), where he plays Miguel.

He has one of the mains roles in the HBO series Prófugos. He also has supporting role in the TVN series Los Archivos del Cardenal. This series tells the ordeals of a group of lawyers than works for Vicaria de la Solidaridad an office within the Catholic Church that investigates crimes by Augusto Pinochet's secret police against left-wing people.

He acted in the movie Radio Corazón (the sequel to El Chacotero Sentimental), with Claudia Di Girólamo, Tamara Acosta and Manuela Martelli, under director Roberto Artiagoitía (El Rumpy) and with screenwriter Pablo Illanes. The argument represents the personal relations among family members and combines various elements, principally comedy, with some romance and drama aspects. He also played supporting roles in the Oscar-nominated No (2012) and the Oscar-winning drama A Fantastic Woman (2017).

== Filmography ==
Year	Title	Role	Notes	Ref(s)
1995	E s 3		Short film	
1997	Historias de fútbol	Francisco		
2001	Un ladrón y su mujer			
2002	Cofralandes, Chilean Rhapsody			
2002	Fragmentos urbanos		Short film	
2002	Ciudad de maravillas	Raul	Short film	
2003	Los Debutantes	Silvio		
2004	La sagrada familia	Marco (hijo)		
2005	Paréntesis			
2006	Las Golondrinas de Altazor	Altazor		
2007	Radio Corazón	Federico		
2012	No	Fernando		
2015	The Memory of Water			
2016	Neruda			
2017	A Fantastic Woman			
2021	Apps			
2022	The Punishment	Mateo		
2024	A Yard of Jackals	Raúl		

== Television ==
=== Soap operas ===
- Iorana (TVN, 1998) - Patricio Tepano
- La Fiera (TVN, 1999) - Carlos Lizana
- Romané (TVN, 2000) - Escudero
- Pampa Ilusión (TVN, 2001) - Tobías Pincheira
- El Circo de las Montini (TVN, 2002) - Rodrigo Marín
- Puertas Adentro (TVN, 2003) - Raúl Brito
- Los Pincheira (TVN, 2004) - Santos Molina
- Cómplices (TVN, 2006) - Sebastián Opazo
- Corazón de María (TVN, 2007) - Miguel Villa
- Viuda Alegre (2008) - Andrés Tapia
- Sin Anestesia (2009) - Dr. Quiñores
- Peleles (2011) - Fabian

=== Series and other TV shows ===
- Cuentos Chilenos (Gracia y el forastero) (2000) - Gabriel
- Cuentos Chilenos (2001)
- Mira Tú (2002) - Maxi
- Profugos (2011) - Vicente Ferragut

== Stage ==
- Cada vez que ladra los perros
- Le senttiment de la langue
- Historia de la Sangre (1995)
- Despertar de Primavera (1996)
- La Misión (1998)
- Calígula (1998)
- La Herencia (2000)
- Hamlet (2000)
- De noche, justo antes de los bosques (2004)
- Roberto Zucco (2006)
- Sueño con revólver (2007)
- Pelo Negro, Boca Arriba (2007)
