= Francisca Imboden =

Chilean actress

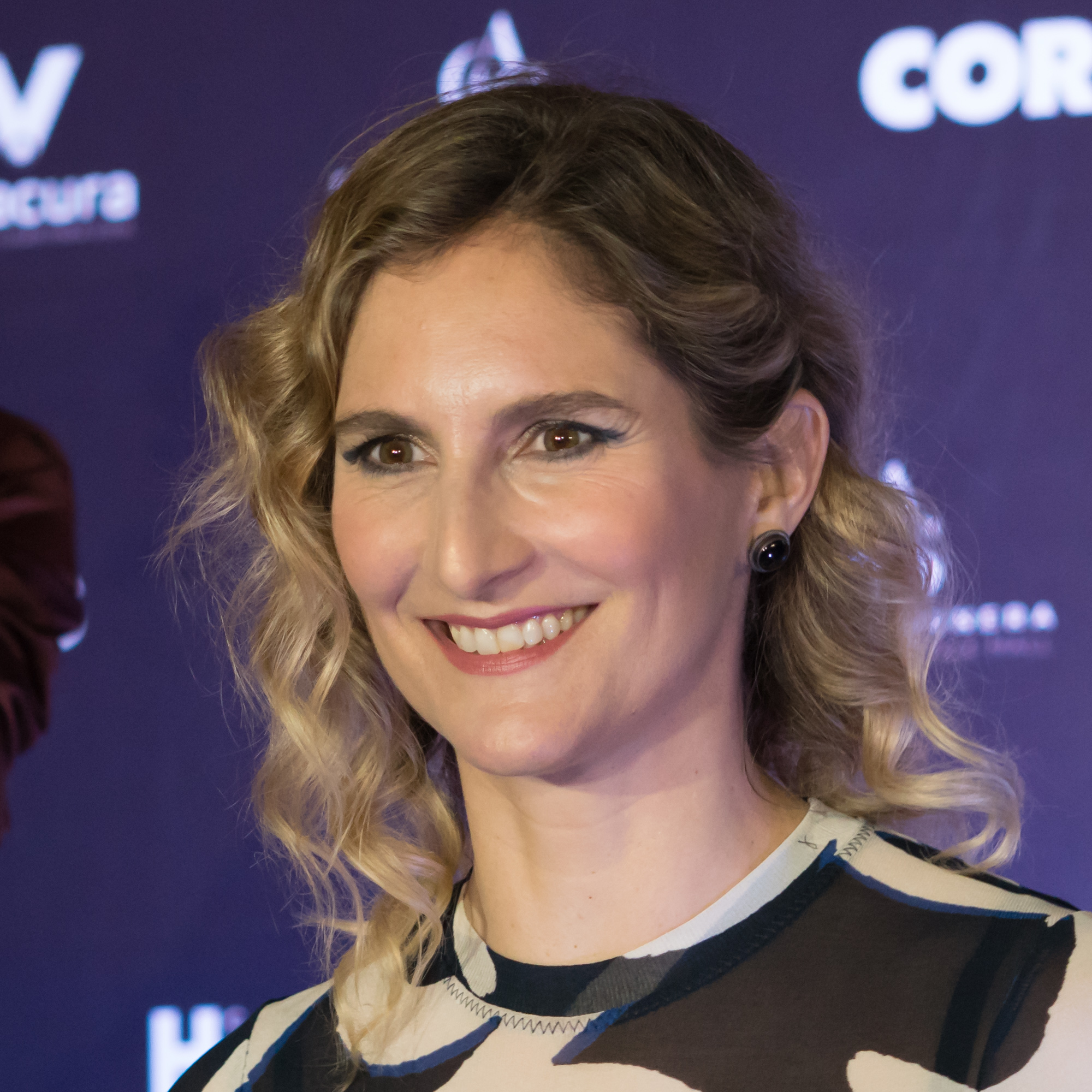
- Imboden in 2017
- Born: Francisca María Imboden Fernández; July 31, 1971 (age 55); Viña del Mar, Chile
- Education: Pontifical Catholic University of Chile
- Occupation: Actress

Francisca María Imboden Fernández (born July 31, 1971) is a Chilean actress who has performed in film, theater and television.

== Life ==
She is the daughter of Juan Carlos Imboden and María Isabel Fernández. Together with her sisters Catalina and Ignacia, she studied at College Français of Viña del Mar, an institution now known as Alliançe Française Jean D'Alambert.

Imboden studied and graduated in theater studies from Pontificia Universidad Católica de Chile, and her professional debut came in the soap opera Oro Verde of TVN in 1997.

She is a columnist for several internet sites, like the magazine "Puntonet", from Terra Networks, in Chile; her pseudonym is "Franca".

Imboden is engaged to Chilean architect Pablo Redondo, and the mother of two daughters and a son.

== Films ==
Films
Year	Film	Character	Notes
2004	Machuca		
2004	Infieles	Andrea	
2004	La Isla		
2004	Tendida, Mitando las Estrellas		
2006	Fuga	Georgina	
2009	El vuelo del Poeta		Raquel Señoret
2019	Hecho bolsa	Alfredo's wife	
Soap Operas
Year	Soap Opera	Character	Channel
1997	Oro Verde	Alejandra Solari	TVN
1998	Iorana	Susana Peñailillo	TVN
1999	La Fiera	Blanca Chamorro	TVN
2000	Romané	María Salomé	TVN
2001	Pampa Ilusión	Isidora Fuenzalida	TVN
2002	El Circo de las Montini	Jessica Mardones	TVN
2003	Pecadores	Dolores "Lola" Barriga / Elisa Cienfuegos	TVN
2004	Destinos Cruzados	Fedora Goycolea	TVN
2005	Versus	Irene Yáñez	TVN
2006	Entre Medias	Renata Sepúlveda	TVN
2007	Alguien te Mira	Josefa "Pepi" Morandé	TVN
2009	¿Dónde está Elisa?	Olivia Domínguez	TVN
2009–2010	Conde Vrolok	Sister Victoria Buzeta	TVN
2010	40 y Tantos	Rosario Elizalde	TVN
2011	Peleles	Susana Leiva	Canal 13
2013	Las Vega's	Verónica Díaz	Canal 13
2015	Papá a la deriva	Rosario Quevedo	Mega
2016	Sres. papis	Maricarmen Riveros	Mega
2017	Tranquilo papá	Pepa Vial	Mega
2019	Juegos de poder	Pilar Egaña	Mega
2021	Demente	Adriana Covarrubias	Mega
2024	Nuevo amores de mercado	Morgana Attal	Mega
TV Series
Year	Serie	Character	Channel
2001	Oveja Nera	Sor Sarita	TVN
2003	Cuentos de Mujeres	Renata	TVN
2003	La Vida es una Lotería	María	TVN
2004	Justicia para Todos	Bernardita de Orrego	TVN
2004	Loco por ti	Fran	TVN
2013	El hombre de tu vida		Canal 13
