= No (2012 film) =

2012 international historical drama film by Pablo Larraín

- Theatrical release poster
- Directed by: Pablo Larraín
- Screenplay by: Pedro Peirano
- Based on: El plebiscito by Antonio Skármeta
- Produced by: Daniel Marc Dreifuss; Pablo Larraín; Juan de Dios Larraín
- Starring: Gael García Bernal
- Cinematography: Sergio Armstrong
- Edited by: Andrea Chignoli
- Music by: Carlos Cabezas
- Production company: Participant Media
- Distributed by: Sony Pictures Classics (US)
- Release dates: 18 May 2012 (Cannes); 9 August 2012 (Chile); 16 November 2012 (premiere); 15 February 2013 (US)
- Running time: 118 minutes
- Countries: Chile; France; United States
- Languages: Spanish; English
- Box office: $7.7 million

No is a 2012 historical drama film directed by Pablo Larraín. It is based on the unpublished stage play El plebiscito by Antonio Skármeta. Mexican actor Gael García Bernal stars as René, a sought-after advertising executive working in Chile in the late 1980s. The film depicts the advertising strategies used during the political campaigns for the 1988 Chilean national plebiscite, in which citizens voted on whether dictator Augusto Pinochet should remain in power for another eight years. At the 85th Academy Awards, No became the first Chilean film to be nominated for the Oscar for Best Foreign Language Film.

== Plot ==
After fifteen years of military dictatorship and under significant international pressure, the Chilean regime calls for a national plebiscite in 1988 to determine whether General Augusto Pinochet should remain in power for another eight years or whether there should be an open democratic presidential election the following year. René Saavedra, a successful advertising creator, is approached by the "No" campaign to consult on their advertising. Despite his politically conservative boss's disapproval, Saavedra agrees to participate and discovers that the advertising is a depressing catalogue of the regime's abuses, created by an organization lacking confidence in its efforts. Saavedra proposes a lighthearted, optimistic approach that emphasizes abstract concepts like "joy" to counter fears that voting in a referendum under a notoriously brutal military junta would be politically meaningless and risky.

While some members of the "No" campaign dismiss the unorthodox marketing theme as a facile dismissal of the regime's horrific abuses, the proposal is approved. Saavedra, his son, and his colleagues are eventually targeted and intimidated by the authorities. When Saavedra's boss, Lucho, discovers his employee's activities, he offers him a partnership if he withdraws, but Saavedra refuses. As a result, Lucho heads the "Yes" campaign to survive.

The historic campaign unfolds in 27 nights of television advertisements, with each side having 15 minutes per night to present its perspective. During that month, the "No" campaign, led by the majority of Chile's artistic community, proves successful with a series of entertaining and insightful presentations that have cross-demographic appeal. By contrast, the "Yes" campaign's advertising, with only dry economic data in its favor and few creative personnel on call, is criticized even by government officials as crude and heavy-handed.

Despite attempts by the government to interfere with the "No" campaign through further intimidation and blatant censorship, Saavedra and his team use those tactics to their advantage in their marketing, and public sympathy shifts to them. As the campaign heats up in the concluding days with international Hollywood celebrity endorsements and wildly popular street concert rallies of the "No" campaign, the "Yes" side is reduced to desperately mimicking the "No" ads.

On the day of the referendum, it initially appears that the "Yes" vote has the lead, but the final result decisively favors the "No" campaign. The ultimate confirmation comes when the troops surrounding the "No" headquarters withdraw as news arrives that the Chilean senior military command has forced Pinochet to concede. Following its triumph, Saavedra and Lucho resume their usual advertising activities in a new Chile.

The film concludes with historical footage of Pinochet handing over power to newly elected president Patricio Aylwin.

== Cast ==
- Gael García Bernal as René Saavedra
- Alfredo Castro as Luis "Lucho" Guzmán
- Luis Gnecco as José Tomás Urrutia
- Antonia Zegers as Verónica Carvajal
- Marcial Tagle as Costa
- Néstor Cantillana as Fernando Arancibia
- Jaime Vadell as Sergio Fernández
- Pascal Montero as Simón Saavedra
- Diego Muñoz as Carlos
- Paloma Moreno as Francisca
- Sergio Hernández
- Alejandro Goic as Ricardo
- Richard Dreyfuss, Jane Fonda, Christopher Reeve, and Augusto Pinochet as themselves in archive footage
- Patricio Aylwin, Patricio Bañados, Carlos Caszely and Florcita Motuda acting as themselves and also appearing in archival footage

== Release ==
At the Telluride Film Festival, the film was shown outdoors and was rained on. It was also screened at the Locarno Film Festival in Switzerland. No played as a Spotlight selection at the Sundance Film Festival. Gael García Bernal attended the Toronto International Film Festival where No was screened. The film was released in the UK by Network on 8 February 2013.

== Reception ==
=== International praise ===
Review aggregation website Rotten Tomatoes gives the film a 93% rating based on 132 reviews, and an average rating of 7.70/10. The website's critical consensus states, "No uses its history-driven storyline to offer a bit of smart, darkly funny perspective on modern democracy and human nature". It also has a score of 81 out of 100 on Metacritic, based on 36 critics, indicating "universal acclaim".

Writing in May 2012, Time Out New York critic David Fear called No "the closest thing to a masterpiece that I've seen so far here in Cannes". Variety reviewer Leslie Felperin felt the film had the "potential to break out of the usual ghettos that keep Latin American cinema walled off from non-Hispanic territories. ....with the international success of Mad Men, marketing campaigners should think about capitalizing on viewers' fascination everywhere with portraits of the advertising industry itself, engagingly scrutinized here with a delicious, Matthew Weiner-style eye for period detail."

One of the unique features of the film was Larraín's decision to use ¾ inch Sony U-matic magnetic tape, which was widely used by television news in the 80s. The Hollywood Reporter argues that this decision probably lessened the film's chances "commercially and with Oscar voters." The Village Voice reviewer commented that the film "allows Larrain's new material to mesh quite seamlessly with c. 1988 footage of actual police crackdowns and pro-democracy assemblages, an accomplishment in cinematic verisimilitude situated anxiously at the halfway point between Medium Cool and Forrest Gump."

In July 2025, it ranked number 97 on Rolling Stone's list of "The 100 Best Movies of the 21st Century."

=== Local criticism ===
The film received mixed reviews in Chile. Several commentators, including politician Genaro Arriagada, who directed the "No" campaign, criticized the film for oversimplifying history—particularly for focusing exclusively on the television advertising campaign while ignoring the crucial role of grassroots voter registration efforts in mobilizing the "No" vote. Larraín defended the film as a work of art rather than a documentary, stating, "A movie is not a testament. It's just the way we looked at it."

In another critique, a Chilean political science professor questioned whether it was appropriate to celebrate the moment when political activism gave way to marketing, rather than a principled debate.

=== Accolades ===
When screened at the 2012 Cannes Film Festival, No won the Art Cinema Award, the top prize in the Directors' Fortnight section. In September 2012, it was selected as Chile's bid for the Foreign Language Oscar at the 85th Academy Awards. In December 2012 it made the January shortlist and was nominated on 10 January 2013. At the 2012 Abu Dhabi Film Festival, Bernal won the award for Best Actor.

Accolades
Award / Film Festival	Category	Recipients	Result
Academy Awards	Best Foreign Language Film	Chile	Nominated
Cannes Film Festival	Art Cinema Award	Pablo Larraín	Won
Havana Film Festival	Best Film	Pablo Larraín	Won
BFI London Film Festival	Best Film	Pablo Larraín	Nominated
National Board of Review	Top Five Foreign Language Films		Won
Films from the South	Best Feature	Pablo Larraín	Nominated
Abu Dhabi Film Festival	Best Actor	Gael García-Bernal	Won
São Paulo International Film Festival	Best Foreign Language Film	Pablo Larraín	Won
Thessaloniki International Film Festival	Open Horizons	Pablo Larraín	Won
Tokyo International Film Festival	Tokyo Grand Prix	Pablo Larraín	Nominated
Altazor Award	Best Fiction Director	Pablo Larraín	Won
Altazor Award	Best Actor	Jaime Vadell	Won
Altazor Award	Best Screenplay	Pedro Peirano	Nominated
St. Louis Gateway Film Critics Association Awards	Best Foreign Language Film		Nominated

== See also ==
- List of submissions to the 85th Academy Awards for Best Foreign Language Film
- List of Chilean submissions for the Academy Award for Best Foreign Language Film
- Cinema of Chile
