= Héctor Noguera =

Chilean actor and theatre director (1937–2025)

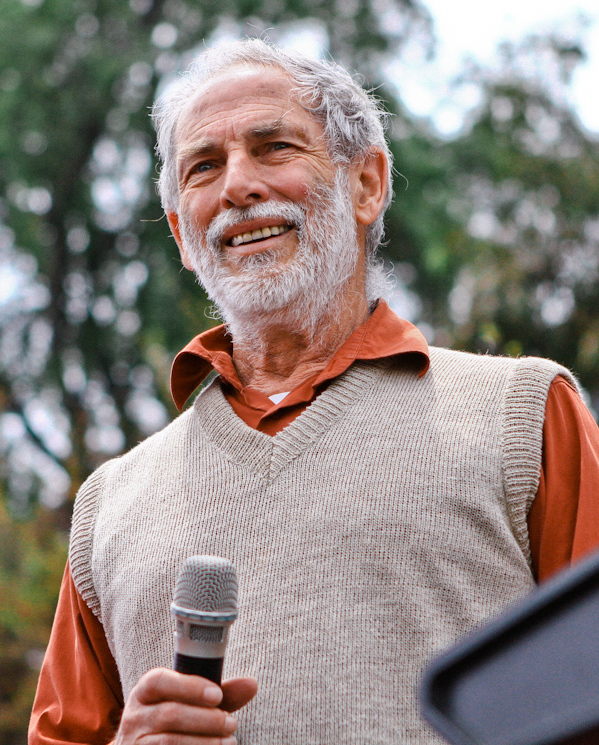
- Noguera in 2013
- Born: Héctor Eugenio Noguera Illanes; July 8, 1937; Santiago, Chile
- Died: October 28, 2025 (aged 88)
- Education: Pontifical Catholic University of Chile
- Occupations: Actor; theatre director
- Years active: 1959–2025
- Awards: National Prize for Performing and Audiovisual Arts (2015)

Héctor Eugenio Noguera Illanes (July 8, 1937 – October 28, 2025) was a Chilean television, theatre and film actor, and also a theatre director.

== Life and career ==
Noguera was the son of Héctor Noguera Prieto (grandson of José Joaquín Prieto Vial and Yolanda Illanes Benítez). He studied at Colegio San Ignacio school and graduated from Pontificia Universidad Católica de Chile. He was married to Isidora Portales and they had two daughters, Amparo and Piedad. Later, he married Claudia Berger and had three children with her, Diego, Emilia and Damián. Héctor debuted on the fotonovelas "Ecran" and "Cine Amor" in the 1960s and on the film El Chacal de Nahueltoro (1969) directed by Miguel Littín.

Noguera is best known for his telenovelas at TVN like "Sucupira", "Romané", "Pampa ilusión", and others. In 2003, he joined Canal 13 with Machos, which was a great success. He won the APES (Asociación de Periodistas de Espectáculos) award for "Best Actor" in 1996, 2000 and 2003 for his roles in "Sucupira", "Romané" and "Machos", respectively. In 2015, the Havana Film Festival New York awarded him the Havana Star Prize for "Best Actor" for his role in the Uruguayan film Mr. Kaplan. He was part of Chilevisión where he recorded "Sin Anestesia" (2009) and "Mujeres de Lujo" (2010).

In 2015 he received Chile's National Prize for Performing and Audiovisual Arts.

Noguera died from cancer on October 28, 2025, at the age of 88.

== Filmography ==
=== Films ===
- 1961 – Deja que los perros ladren, directed by Naúm Kramarenco
- 1969 – El chacal de Nahueltoro, directed by Miguel Littín – Chaplain
- 1970 – El fin del juego, directed by Luis Cornejo
- 1972 – State of Siege, directed by Costa-Gavras – Tupamaro leader (uncredited)
- 1975 – La pérgola de las flores, directed by Hugo Miller
- 1983 – The Compass Rose, directed by Patricio Guzmán
- 1985 – Sexto A 1965, directed by Claudio Di Girolamo
- 1988 – Imagen latente, directed by Pablo Perelman
- 1991 – La frontera, directed by Ricardo Larraín – Father Patricio
- 1992 – Archipiélago, directed by Pablo Perelman
- 1999 – La chica del Crillón, directed by Alberto Daiber
- 2000 – 30 ans, directed by Laurent Perrin – Luis Miguel Suerte
- 2003 – Sub Terra, directed by Marcelo Ferrari – Luis Cousiño
- 2006 – Fuga, directed by Pablo Larraín – Klaus Roth
- 2008 – Desierto sur, directed by Shawn Garry – Iñaki Martiarena
- 2008 – El regalo, directed by Cristián Galaz and Andrea Ugalde – Nicolás
- 2014 – Mr. Kaplan, directed by Álvaro Brechner – Jacobo
- 2016 – Noche, directed by Inti Carrizo
- 2016 – Neruda, directed by Pablo Larraín
- 2020 – Los invitados, directed by Valentina Arango – Verner
- 2021 – (Im)Patient, directed by Constanza Fernández Bertrand – Sergio Graf

=== Telenovelas and television series ===
- 1963 – El invernadero (Canal 13) Jaime Callifer
- 1965 – El litre 4196 (Canal 13) Gerardo Olivares
- 1967 – Los días jóvenes (Canal 13) – Álvaro Arrau
- 1972 – La sal del desierto (TVN) – Bernardo Covarrubias
- 1975 – Parejas de trapo (Canal 13)
- 1975 – La pérgola de las flores (TVN) – Carlucho
- 1977 – Padre Gallo (Canal 13) – Patricio
- 1985 – Matrimonio de papel (Canal 13) – Javier Moyano
- 1988 – Semidiós (Canal 13) – Ponce
- 1991 – Volver a empezar (TVN) – Ignacio Urmeneta
- 1992 – Trampas y caretas (TVN) – Américo
- 1993 – Ámame (TVN) – Américo de Bantes
- 1994 – Rompecorazón (TVN) – Alvaro Sulivan/Mario Barrientos
- 1995 – Estúpido Cupido (TVN) – Obispo
- 1996 – Sucupira (TVN) – Federico Valdivieso
- 1997 – Oro verde (TVN) – Ignacio Meyer
- 1998 – Sucupira, la comedia (TVN) – Federico Valdivieso
- 2000 – Romané (TVN) – Melquiades Antich
- 2001 – Pampa ilusión (TVN) – William Clark
- 2003 – Machos (Canal 13) – Ángel Mercader
- 2004 – Tentación (Canal 13) – Julián Domínguez
- 2006 – Descarado (Canal 13) – Franco Miretti
- 2006 – Huaiquimán y Tolosa (Canal 13) – Carlos Montoya
- 2007 – Heroes – Ambrosio O'Higgins
- 2007 – Lola (Canal 13) – Carlos Aguirre
- 2009 – Sin anestesia (CHV) – Dr. Alfonso Valenzuela
- 2010 – Mujeres de lujo (CHV) – Ronny Palma
- 2011 – Infiltradas (CHV) – Faustino Santo Domingo
- 2012 – La sexóloga (CHV) – Hernán "Nano" Hidalgo
- 2014 – Las 2 Carolinas (CHV) – Rolando Vallejos
- 2014 – Sudamerican rockers (CHV) – Alfredo Benítez
- 2017 – Perdona nuestros pecados (Mega) – Obispo Subercaseaux
- 2017 – Neruda, la serie (Mega) – Senador
- 2018 – Casa de muñecos (Mega) – Sergio Falco
- 2019 – Juegos de poder (Mega) – Patricio Egaña
- 2020 – Historias de cuarentena (Mega) – Aníbal Bustamante
- 2021 – Pobre novio (Mega) – Arturo Thompson
- 2023 – Como la vida misma (Mega) – Armando Morales
- 2024 – El señor de La Querencia (Mega) – Mons. Mariano Echaurren
- 2025 – Aguas de oro (Mega) – Ernesto Ruiz-Tagle
