= List of Televisión Nacional de Chile telenovelas =

Current logo of Televisión Nacional de Chile.

Televisión Nacional de Chile (TVN) is a Chilean state-owned national television network founded on October 24, 1969. Villa Los Aromos was the first telenovela produced by the network.

== 1980s ==
=== 1981 ===
- Villa Los Aromos

=== 1982 ===
- De cara al mañana
- La gran mentira

=== 1983 ===
- El Juego de la vida

=== 1984 ===
- La represa
- La torre 10

=== 1985 ===
- Morir de amor

=== 1986 ===
- La dama del balcón
- La villa

=== 1987 ===
- Mi nombre es Lara

=== 1988 ===
- Bellas y audaces
- Las dos caras del amor

=== 1989 ===
- A la sombra del ángel

== 1990s ==
=== 1990 ===
- El milagro de vivir

=== 1991 ===
- Volver a empezar

=== 1992 ===
- Trampas y caretas

=== 1993 ===
- Jaque Mate
- Ámame

=== 1994 ===
- Rompecorazón
- Rojo y miel

=== 1995 ===
- Estúpido Cupido
- Juegos de fuego

=== 1996 ===
- Sucupira
- Loca piel

=== 1997 ===
- Oro verde
- Tic Tac

=== 1998 ===
- Iorana
- Borrón y cuenta nueva

=== 1999 ===
- La fiera
- Aquelarre

== 2000s ==
=== 2000 ===
- Romané
- Santo ladrón

=== 2001 ===
- Pampa Ilusión
- Amores de mercado

=== 2002 ===
- El circo de las Montini
- Purasangre

=== 2003 ===
- Puertas adentro
- 16
- Pecadores

=== 2004 ===
- Los Pincheira
- Destinos cruzados
- Ídolos

=== 2005 ===
- 17
- Los Capo
- Los treinta
- Versus

=== 2006 ===
- Amor en tiempo récord
- Entre medias
- Cómplices
- Disparejas
- Floribella

=== 2007 ===
- Corazón de María
- Alguien Te Mira
- Amor por accidente
- Karkú

=== 2008 ===
- Viuda Alegre
- El señor de La Querencia
- Hijos del Monte

=== 2009 ===
- Los exitosos Pells
- ¿Dónde está Elisa?
- Los Ángeles de Estela
- Conde Vrolok

== 2010s ==
=== 2010 ===
Year	Title	Author	Ref
2010	Martín Rivas	Víctor Carrasco, David Bustos, Fernando Delgado, Jaime Morales, Carlos Oporto	
2010	40 y Tantos	Marcelo Leonart, Ximena Carrera, Andrea Franco, Rocío Mendoza, Carla Stagno, José Fonseca	
2010	La familia de al lado	José Ignacio Valenzuela	

=== 2011 ===
Year	Title	Author	Ref
2011	Témpano	Pablo Illanes, Hugo Morales, Andrés Telias, Juan Pablo Olave	
2011	El Laberinto de Alicia	Josefina Fernández, Larissa Contreras, Arnaldo Madrid	
2011	Esperanza	Alejandro Cabrera, María José Galleguillos, Guillermo Valenzuela, Benito Escobar	
2011	Aquí mando yo	Daniella Castagno, Luis Ponce, Elena Muñoz, Rodrigo Muñoz, Rodrigo Bastidas	
2011	Su Nombre es Joaquín	Victor Carrasco, Jaime Morales, Carlos Oporto, David Bustos	

=== 2012 ===
Year	Title	Author	Ref
2012	Reserva de familia	Pablo Illanes, Larissa Contrera, Juan Pablo Olave, Jaime Morales	
2012	Pobre Rico	Alejandro Cabrera, María José Galleguillos, Guillermo Valenzuela, Benito Escobar, Trinidad Jimenez	
2012	Dama y Obrero	José Ignacio Valenzuela	
2012	Separados	Daniella Castagno	

=== 2013 ===
Year	Title	Author	Ref
2013	Solamente Julia	Camila Villagrán, Carla Stagno, Andrea Franco, Liliana García-Urmeneta, Paula Parra, Rosario Valenzuela	
2013	Dos por uno	Sebastián Arrau	
2013	Socias	Rodrigo Bastidas, Josefina Fernández, Hugo Morales, Juan Pablo Olave, Elena Muñoz, Francisca Bernardi	
2013	Somos los Carmona	Carlos Oporto	
2013	El regreso	Larissa Contreras	

=== 2014 ===
Year	Title	Author	Ref
2014	Vuelve temprano	Daniella Castagno	
2014	El amor lo manejo yo	Enrique Estevanez, Marcelo Nacci, Laura Barneix, Guillermo Valenzuela	
2014	Volver a amar	Camila Villagrán, Rosario Valenzuela, Malú Urriola	
2014	No abras la puerta	Julio Rojas	
2014	Caleta del sol	Carlos Oporto	
2014	La Chúcara	Julio Rojas, Valeria Hofmann	

=== 2015 ===
Year	Title	Author	Ref
2015	Dueños del paraíso	Pablo Illanes	
2015	La poseída	Julio Rojas; Josefina Fernández	
2015	Matriarcas	Sebastián Arrau	
2015	Esa no soy yo	Camila Villagrán	

=== 2016 ===
Year	Title	Author	Ref
2016	El camionero	Luis López Aliaga; Ángela Bascuñán; Vicente Sabatini	

=== 2017 ===
Year	Title	Author	Ref
2017	Un diablo con ángel	Julio Rojas; Eugenio García	
2017	La colombiana	Jaime Morales	
2017	Wena profe	Carlos Galofré	
2017	Dime quién fue	Marcelo Castañón; Valentina Pollarolo	

=== 2019 ===
Year	Title	Author	Ref
2019	Amar a morir	Jaime Morales	

== See also ==
- Televisión Nacional de Chile
- List of Canal 13 telenovelas
- List of Chilean telenovelas
- List of Chilean films
- List of Chilean actors
