= Óscar Hernández (actor) =

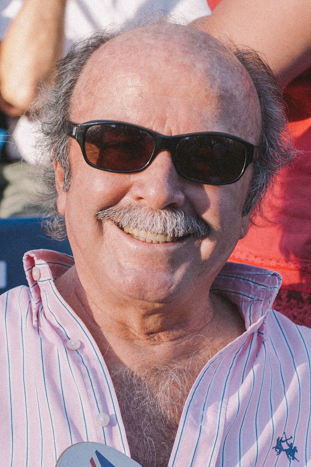
- Hernández in 2013
- Born: Óscar Benjamín Hernández Torres; August 21, 1947 (age 78); Santiago de Chile
- Occupation: Actor

Óscar Benjamín Hernández Torres (Santiago, August 21, 1947) is a Chilean stage and television actor. He is known for his various roles in telenovelas produced by Televisión Nacional de Chile (TVN).

== Biography ==
He has spent almost his entire television acting career at Televisión Nacional de Chile (TVN), where he remained for over 30 years. His television career began with supporting roles in various telenovelas, some of Vicente Sabatini's most successful productions, such as La Torre 10, Bellas y Audaces, Estúpido Cupido, Sucupira Oro Verde, Iorana, La Fiera, Romané, Pampa Ilusión, El Circo de las Montini, Los Pincheira, Cómplices, Corazón de María, Viuda Alegre, Los Exitosos Pells, and Su nombre es Joaquín, among others. In 2009, following the departure of the director of TVN's drama department, many actors also left, but he decided to stay when María Eugenia Rencoret took over as general director of the drama department. He is currently one of the most recognized supporting actors for his long career at the channel. In 2011, he appeared in two primetime telenovelas: El laberinto de Alicia in the first half of the year and Su nombre es Joaquín in the second. In 2017, the actor returned to daytime television as part of the cast of La Colombiana, where he played Eric Ramírez, a neighborhood barber with three children. He later made a guest appearance in Wena profe, playing the grandfather of the character portrayed by Patricio Pimienta. In 2018, he appeared in the daytime telenovela Amar a morir, playing Emilio, the oncologist of the protagonist, played by Felipe Braun. His most recent appearances were guest roles in the telenovelas Juegos de poder and Hijos del desierto, both on Mega.

In film he has participated in productions such as The Shipwrecked (1994), Paradise B (2002), B-Happy (2003), The Prince (2019), Prison in the Andes (2023), and La Fuente (2025).

== Filmography ==
=== Films ===
- La Fuente (2025)
- Prison in the Andes (2023)
- The Prince (2019)
- Raúl (2014)
- Paseo de oficina (2012)
- B-Happy (2003)
- Paraíso B (2002)
- Un ladrón y su mujer (2001)
- The Shipwrecked (1994)

=== Television ===
Telenovelas
Year			Channel
Year	Title	Role	Channel
1984	La represa	Anselmo Gutiérrez	TVN
1984	La torre 10	Alejandro Walker	TVN
1985	Morir de amor	Sergio Marambio	TVN
1987	Mi nombre es Lara	José Velasco	TVN
1988	Bellas y audaces	Víctor Silvani	TVN
1988	Las dos caras del amor	Julián García	TVN
1989	A la sombra del ángel	Mariano Saldías	TVN
1991	Volver a empezar	Cornelio Jara	TVN
1992	Trampas y caretas	Octavio Dupré	TVN
1993	Jaque mate	Úlises Tapia	TVN
1994	Rompe corazón	Ramón Soto	TVN
1995	Estúpido cupido	Pancracio Carmona	TVN
1996	Sucupira	Carlos López	TVN
1997	Oro verde	Ramiro Guzmán	TVN
1998	Iorana	Lázaro Tepano	TVN
1999	La Fiera	Rubén Alvarado	TVN
2000	Romané	Alfredo Gaete	TVN
2000	Santo ladrón	Romualdo Leiva	TVN
2001	Pampa Ilusión	Tomás Navarro	TVN
2002	El circo de las Montini	Pedro Marín	TVN
2003	Puertas Adentro	Eusebio Moraga	TVN
2004	Los Pincheira	Sofanor Silva	TVN
2005	Los Capo	Camilo Norfini	TVN
2006	Cómplices	Benito Quintana	TVN
2007	Corazón de María	Tirso Bizama	TVN
2008	Viuda alegre	Ramiro Opazo	TVN
2009	Los exitosos Pells	Álvaro Primm	TVN
2011	El laberinto de Alicia	Julio Mardones	TVN
2011	Su nombre es Joaquín	Eduardo Mardones	TVN
2013	Solamente Julia	Manuel Muñoz	TVN
2015	La Poseída	Bernardo Urmeneta	TVN
2017	La Colombiana	Eric Ramírez	TVN
2017	Wena profe	Segismundo Salas	TVN
2018	Amar a morir	Emilio Cintolesi	TVN

=== TV Series ===
Television series
Year	Serie	Role	Channel
1982	Una familia feliz	Félix Ceballos	Canal 13
1987	La Quintrala	Juan del Pozo y Silva	TVN
1989	Teresa de los Andes	Padre Valdés	TVN
1993	La patrulla del desierto	Patricio Lynch	Canal 13
1996	La Buhardilla	Marco	TVN
1998-1999	Sucupira, la comedia	Carlos López	TVN
2004	Bienvenida realidad	Padre de Camila	TVN
2005	Tiempo final: en tiempo real	Comisario Caro	TVN
2008	Paz	Señor Riquelme	TVN
2011	Los archivos del cardenal	Victorino Medici	TVN
2011	12 días que estremecieron a Chile	Osvaldo Osorio	Chilevisión
2013	Prófugos	Maquinista del tren	HBO
2018	Casa de Angelis	Isidoro Santa Cruz	TVN
