= Myriam Palacios =

Chilean actress and comedian

- Born: Myriam Isabel Palacios Piña; 18 December 1936; Victoria, Chile
- Died: 18 March 2013 (aged 76); Providencia, Chile
- Resting place: Parque del Recuerdo
- Education: University of Chile
- Occupations: Actress, comedian
- Years active: 1960–2006
- Spouse: Jorge Gajardo (divorced in 2002)

Myriam Isabel Palacios Piña (18 December 1936 – 18 March 2013) was a Chilean actress and comedian who worked in theater, film, and television. She was the winner of two APES Awards for her theater performances.

== Biography ==
The daughter of Héctor Palacios and Isabel Piña, Myriam Palacios was born in the district of Victoria, Araucanía Region.

Her theatrical training took place at the University Theater of Concepción and the Theater School of the University of Chile (1960). She participated in the play Tres Marías y una Rosa, directed by Raúl Osorio, which was very successful and was performed in several cities in Latin America and Europe.

She acted in numerous telenovelas, and developed her role as a comedian on the programs De chincol a jote and Jappening con ja. She made her film debut in 1988, when she played Laura in Gonzalo Justiniano's Sussi. She also acted in Caluga o menta (1990), Amnesia (1994), The Sentimental Teaser (1999), and Coronation (2000) – for which she would receive an Altazor Award nomination – among others.

Palacios was awarded as the Best Film Actress by the Theater Actors' Syndicate (SIDARTE) in 2000, and won two APES Awards for her performances in the plays Chiloé cielos cubiertos and La pérgola de las flores.

Toward the end of her life she suffered from Alzheimer's disease and lived in a nursing home for six years. She died on 18 March 2013 at age 76.

== Filmography ==
=== Film ===
- El 18 de los García (1983) as Clementina
- Sussi (1987) as Nelida
- Hechos consumados (1988) as Eloisa
- Consuelo (1988) as Ursulina
- Caluga o menta (1990) as Sra de clase alta
- Dos mujeres en la ciudad (1990) as Altagracia
- La niña en la palomera (1991) as Inés
- The Shipwrecked (1994)
- Amnesia (1994)
- Pasión gitana (1997)
- The Sentimental Teaser (1999)
- Coronation (2000)
- Las golondrinas de Altazor (2006) as seamstress; her last role

=== Television ===
==== Telenovelas and series ====
Telenovelas
| Year | Title | Role | Channel |
|---|---|---|---|
| 1982 | Celos | Clotilde | Canal 13 |
| 1983 | Las herederas | Magdalena | Canal 13 |
| 1984 | La represa | Auristela Novoa | TVN |
| 1985 | Matrimonio de papel | María Chamorro | Canal 13 |
| 1986 | La villa | Elcira Díaz | TVN |
| 1987 | Mi nombre es Lara | Corina | TVN |
| 1989 | Bravo | Rufina | Canal 13 |
| 1993 | Marrón Glacé | Chela | Canal 13 |
| 1994 | Champaña | Florita | Canal 13 |
| 1995 | El amor está de moda | Rosalía | Canal 13 |
| 1995 | Amor a domicilio | Helga Holguett | Canal 13 |
| 1996 | Marrón Glacé, el regreso | Chela | Canal 13 |
| 1997 | Playa salvaje | Lídia Meneses | Canal 13 |
| 1999 | Fuera de control | Trinidad Sanhueza | Canal 13 |
| 2001 | Corazón pirata | Felicinda Sánchez | Canal 13 |
TV series
| Year | Title | Role | Channel |
| 1989 | Teresa de los Andes | Hermana Juana del Niño Jesús | TVN |
| 1997 | Las historias de Sussi | Doña Guberlinda | TVN |

==== Other programs ====
- De chincol a jote
- Jappening con ja
- Morandé con compañía
