= List of Canal 13 (Chilean TV network) telenovelas =

The following is a list of telenovelas produced by Canal 13.

== 1980s ==
Year	Title	Premiere date	Finale date	No. of episodes	Ref.
1981	La madrastra	April 21, 1981	September 18, 1981	75	
1981	Casagrande	October 8, 1981	January 27, 1982	unknown	
1982	Alguien por quien vivir	March 15, 1982	September 10, 1982	117	
1982	Bienvenido Hermano Andes	July 12, 1982	unknown	unknown	
1982	Celos	September 13, 1982	February 1983	123	
1982	Anakena	1982	unknown	12	
1983	La noche del cobarde	1983	unknown	unknown	
1983	Las herederas	August 1983	February 3, 1984	unknown	
1984	Los títeres	March 1984	August 1984	110	
1984	Andrea, justicia de mujer	July 16, 1984	November 23, 1984	85	
1985	Matrimonio de papel	March 11, 1985	May 17, 1985	50	
1985	La trampa	May 22, 1985	October 14, 1985	65	
1985	El prisionero de la medianoche	1985	unknown	unknown	
1986	Ángel malo	March 11, 1986	August 1, 1986	88	
1986	Secreto de familia	August 4, 1986	December 1986	unknown	
1987	La invitación	1987	unknown	120	
1987	La última cruz	July 15, 1987	January 1, 1988	unknown	
1988	Semidios	March 7, 1988	September 2, 1988	125	
1988	Vivir así	September 12, 1988	November 11, 1988	30	
1988	Matilde dedos verdes	November 14, 1988	December 23, 1988	40	
1989	La intrusa	March 27, 1989	July 29, 1989	100	
1989	Bravo	August 1, 1989	December 11, 1989	100	

== 1990s ==
Year	Title	Premiere date	Finale date	No. of episodes	Ref.
1990	¿Te conté?	April 16, 1990	September 7, 1990	110	
1990	Acércate más	September 5, 1990	January 11, 1991	96	
1991	Villa Nápoli	April 1, 1991	August 15, 1991	98	
1991	Ellas por ellas	August 19, 1991	December 20, 1991	81	
1992	El palo al gato	March 23, 1992	June 26, 1992	65	
1992	Fácil de amar	August 17, 1992	December 30, 1992	92	
1993	Marrón Glacé	March 15, 1993	July 30, 1993	100	
1993	Doble juego	August 2, 1993	December 10, 1993	113	
1994	Champaña	March 14, 1994	July 22, 1994	92	
1994	Top Secret	August 3, 1994	December 9, 1994	85	
1995	El amor está de moda	March 13, 1995	July 17, 1995	85	
1995	Amor a domicilio	July 24, 1995	December 14, 1995	102	
1996	Marrón Glacé, el regreso	March 11, 1996	July 26, 1996	97	
1996	Adrenalina	July 29, 1996	December 21, 1996	103	
1997	Eclipse de luna	March 10, 1997	July 25, 1997	unknown	
1997	Playa salvaje	July 21, 1997	December 19, 1997	110	
1998	Amándote	March 9, 1998	July 31, 1998	105	
1998	Marparaíso	August 3, 1998	December 22, 1998	102	
1999	Fuera de control	March 8, 1999	July 30, 1999	97	
1999	Cerro Alegre	August 4, 1999	December 22, 1999	100	

== 2000s ==
Year	Title	Premiere date	Finale date	No. of episodes	Ref.
2000	Sabor a ti	March 1, 2000	August 11, 2000	112	
2001	Corazón pirata	March 5, 2001	August 3, 2001	106	
2001	Piel Canela	August 6, 2001	November 16, 2001	69	
2002	Buen partido	August 5, 2002	December 23, 2002	95	
2003	Machos	March 10, 2003	October 27, 2003	163	
2004	Hippie	March 8, 2004	August 12, 2004	108	
2004	Tentación	September 6, 2004	February 9, 2005	110	
2004	Quiero	October 19, 2004	February 15, 2005	80	
2005	Brujas	March 7, 2005	August 23, 2005	135	
2005	Gatas y tuercas	September 13, 2005	March 7, 2006	125	
2006	Descarado	March 6, 2006	September 26, 2006	145	
2006	Charly tango	September 27, 2006	December 8, 2006	52	
2007	Papi Ricky	March 12, 2007	October 1, 2007	135	
2007	Lola	September 26, 2007	November 4, 2008	276	
2008	Don Amor	March 3, 2008	September 1, 2008	126	
2009	Cuenta conmigo	March 2, 2009	August 21, 2009	106	
2009	Corazón rebelde	August 18, 2009	December 16, 2009	80	

== 2010s ==
Year	Title	Premiere date	Finale date	No. of episodes	Ref.
2010	Feroz	March 8, 2010	August 27, 2010	122	
2010	Primera dama	August 30, 2010	March 9, 2011	127	
2011	Peleles	July 26, 2011	January 15, 2012	83	
2012	Soltera otra vez	May 27, 2012	September 5, 2012	44	
2013	Las Vega's	March 17, 2013	July 18, 2013	77	
2013	Soltera otra vez 2	July 21, 2013	January 8, 2014	80	
2013	Secretos en el jardín	November 24, 2013	July 9, 2014	101	
2014	Mamá mechona	March 3, 2014	August 19, 2014	118	
2014	Chipe libre	August 3, 2014	January 26, 2015	97	
2014	Valió la pena	October 19, 2014	February 19, 2015	73	
2016	Veinteañero a los 40	January 3, 2016	July 26, 2016	93	
2016	Preciosas	August 1, 2016	January 31, 2017	94	
2018	Soltera otra vez 3	March 5, 2018	September 19, 2018	101	
2018	Pacto de sangre	September 24, 2018	May 28, 2019	133	
2018	La reina de Franklin	November 19, 2018	May 2, 2019	97	
2019	Río Oscuro	May 27, 2019	November 15, 2019	94	
2019	Amor a la Catalán	July 7, 2019	February 20, 2020	124	

== 2020s ==
Year	Title	Premiere date	Finale date	No. of episodes	Ref.
2021	La torre de Mabel	June 14, 2021	February 24, 2022	143	
2024	Secretos de familia	March 10, 2024	October 10, 2024	140	

== See also ==
- Canal 13 (Chilean TV network)
- List of Televisión Nacional de Chile telenovelas
- List of Chilean telenovelas
- List of Chilean films
- List of Chilean actors
