= Bastián Bodenhöfer =

Chilean actor

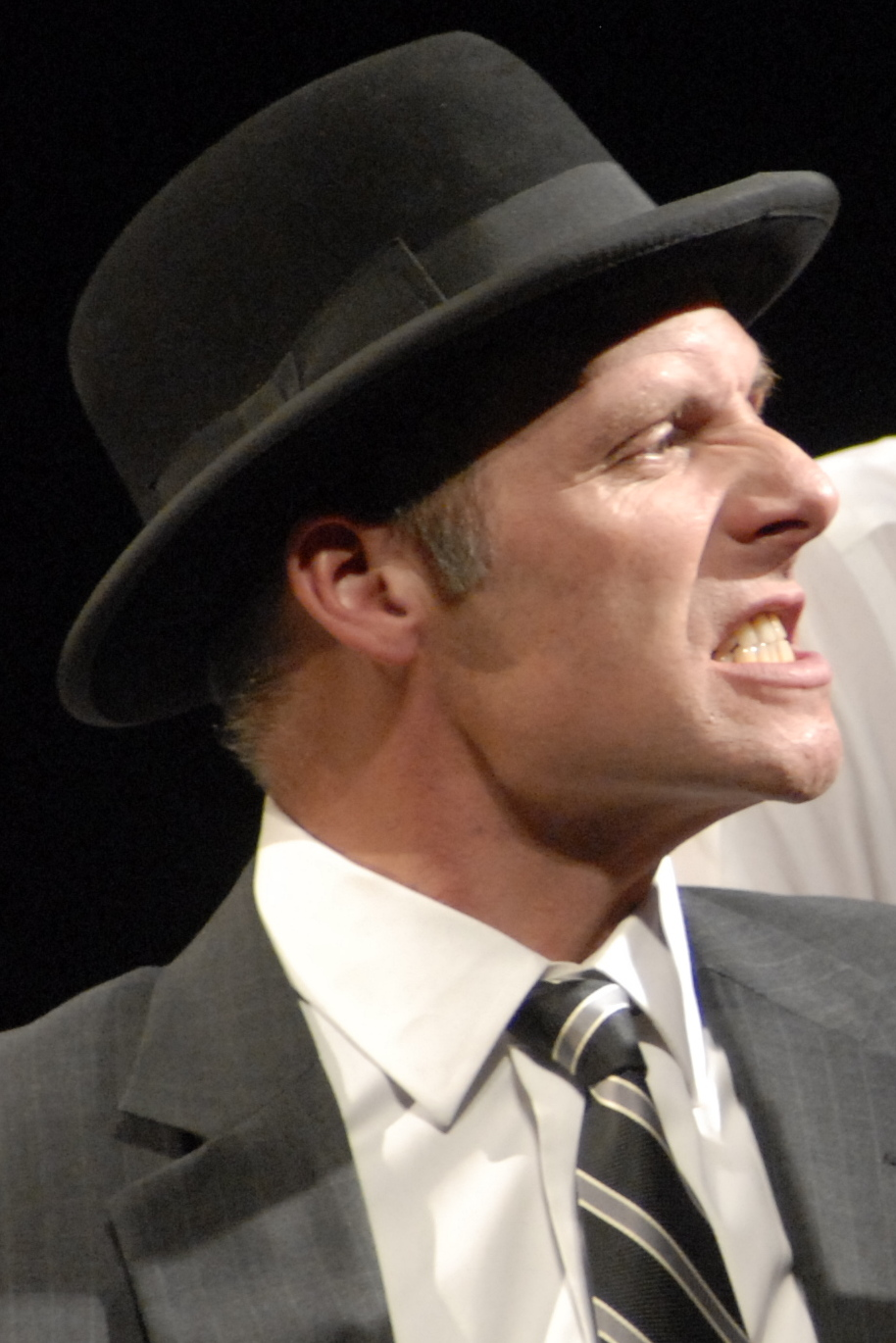
- Bodenhöfer in 2008
- Born: Bastián Lorenzo Bodenhöfer Alexander; July 1, 1961 (age 65); Santiago, Chile
- Occupation: Actor

Bastián Lorenzo Bodenhöfer Alexander (Santiago, July 1, 1961) is a Chilean actor, theater director, musician and cultural manager. He served as cultural attaché of the Chile embassy in France between 2000 and 2002, during the government of president Ricardo Lagos. Bodenhöfer established himself as a renowned actor in the telenovela Ángel Malo in 1986. During the 1990s, due to his physical attractiveness, his solid presence and his talent, he became the highest paid male lead in Televisión Nacional de Chile.

== Personal life ==
He is the son of the German-Chilean Jew composer Leni Alexander. He also studied in the Conservatoire de Paris where he developed as a saxophone and clarinet player. His brother, Andreas, is also a composer and his niece Miranda Bodenhöfer an actress and dancer. Bodenhöfer was married to Consuelo Holzapfel (1983–1991) with whom he had two children; Damián Bodenhöfer and Maira Bodenhöfer, both actors. He also was married to Aline Küppenheim (2000–2006) and had a son called Ian Bodenhöfer.

== Filmography ==
Film
Year	Film	Character	Director
1987	Sussi	Nelson	Gonzalo Justiniano
1988	Imagen latente	Pedro	Pablo Perelman
1994	Los náufragos	Matías	Miguel Littín
1999	Last Call	Miguel	Christine Lucas
2004	Infieles	Carlos	Christine Lucas
2004	Inportunición	Ricardo	Luis Echavarri
2007	Radio Corazón	Jorge Covarrubias	Roberto Artiagoitía
2013	El verano de los peces voladores	Carlos	Marcela Said
2013	The Dance of Reality	Carlos Ibáñez del Campo	Alejandro Jodorowsky
2014	Letters from Santiago	Álvaro de Aránguiz	Peter Gersina
2016	Poesía sin fin	Carlos Ibáñez del Campo	Alejandro Jodorowsky
2023	Prison in the Andes	Miguel Krassnoff	Felipe Carmona
2026	Wild Horse Nine	Priest	Martin McDonagh

== TV shows ==
=== Telenovelas ===
Telenovela
Year	Telenovela	Character	Type	Channel
1981	La madrastra	Boris	Especial	Canal 13
1981	Casagrande	Ignacio	Especial	Canal 13
1982	La gran mentira	Eduardo Echaurren	Papel principal	TVN
1983	El juego de la vida	Agustín "Cucho" Ramírez	Secundario	TVN
1984	La represa	Marcelo Álvarez	Secundario	TVN
1985	Matrimonio de papel	Rodrigo Dellany	Papel principal	Canal 13
1986	Ángel malo	Roberto Álvarez	Papel principal	Canal 13
1987	Mi nombre es Lara	Pablo Mondetti	Papel principal	TVN
1988	Semidiós	Alejandro "Alex" García	Papel principal	Canal 13
1989	Bravo	Eduardo Rivas	Papel principal	Canal 13
1990	¿Te conté?	Leonardo "Leo" Donoso	Papel principal	Canal 13
1991	Ellas por ellas	Mario Cáceres	Papel principal	Canal 13
1992	Trampas y caretas	Luis Felipe Fabres	Papel principal	TVN
1993	Ámame	Luciano Rivarosa	Papel principal	TVN
1994	Rojo y miel	Rodrigo Carvajal	Papel principal	TVN
1995	Juegos de fuego	Lucas Pereira	Papel principal	TVN
1996	Loca piel	Guillermo Carter	Papel principal	TVN
1997	Tic tac	Tomás Barcelona	Papel principal	TVN
1999	Aquelarre	Ignacio Pastene	Papel principal	TVN
2000	Santo ladrón	Jacinto Algarañaz	Papel principal	TVN
2006	Montecristo	Horacio Díaz-Herrera	Especial	Mega
2007	Fortunato	Emilio Uriarte	Papel principal	Mega
2009	Cuenta conmigo	Camilo Sarmiento	Papel principal	Canal 13
2010	Conde Vrolok	Barón Lucio Martino	Especial	TVN
2010	40 y Tantos	Gaspar Mellado	Secundario	TVN
2011	El Laberinto de Alicia	Baltazar Andrade	Secundario	TVN
2011	Su nombre es Joaquín	Raúl Sanfuentes	Secundario	TVN
2014	Valió la pena	Raimundo Montes	Secundario	Canal 13
2015	Matriarcas	Iván Santolini	Especial	TVN
2016	El camionero	Felipe Cienfuegos	Secundario	TVN
2019	Amar a morir	Hernán "Nano" Palacios	Secundario	TVN

=== TV series ===
TV series
Year	Serie	Role	Channel
1992	Estrictamente sentimental	Hernán Cox	TVN
2004	Geografía del deseo	Javier Álvarez	TVN
2004–2006	JPT: Justicia Para Todos	José Luis Orrego	TVN
2005	Tiempo final: en tiempo real	Gerardo	TVN
2005	Loco por ti	Paulo Selman	TVN
2005	Los Simuladores	Mario Santos	Canal 13
2007	Héroes	Ignacio de la Carrera	Canal 13
2008–2009	El blog de la Feña	Roberto McGellar	Canal 13
2012	Cobre	William Blake	Mega
2013	Bim bam bum	Danny Key	TVN
2014	El hombre de tu vida	Manuel	Canal 13
2014	Los 80 (episode 69)	Enrique	Canal 13
2015	Los años dorados	Agustín Martínez	UCV
2020	El Presidente	Policía	Amazon Prime Video
2020	Los Carcamales		Canal 13
