= Last Call (1999 film) =

- Directed by: Christine Lucas
- Screenplay by: Jorge Durán; Christine Lucas; David T. Page
- Produced by: Juan Harting
- Starring: Bastián Bodenhöfer; Elizabeth Berkley; Garret Dillahunt; Peter Coyote; Lorene Prieto; Eric Michael Cole
- Cinematography: Antonio Farías
- Edited by: Danielle Fillios
- Music by: Andreas Bodenhöfer
- Production company: Roos Film
- Distributed by: Echo Bridge Home Entertainment (DVD)
- Release dates: 3 January 1999 (Chile); 8 August 1999 (US)
- Running time: 92 minutes
- Countries: Chile; United States
- Language: English

Last Call is a Chilean-American psychological thriller film. It was released in Chile on 3 January 1999, and in the United States on 8 August 1999 at the Hollywood Film Festival.

As it is a collaboration between both countries, and a Chilean production aimed at the American market, the dialogue is in English. It features American and Chilean actors such as Bastián Bodenhöfer, Elizabeth Berkley, Peter Coyote, and Lorene Prieto.

== Plot ==
In a central apartment building in Santiago, three foreigners wait impatiently for a call to carry out an illegal operation in the desert. In her apartment, Helena, a lonely American woman, waits for her lover. Upstairs, Nico settles in his brother's apartment. As time goes by, tension increases, intertwining these characters' lives in a sordid and oppressive environment.

== Cast ==
- Peter Coyote as Xuave
- Eric Michael Cole as Nico
- Lorene Prieto as Cote
- Elizabeth Rossa as Connie
- Bastián Bodenhöfer as Miguel
- Elizabeth Berkley as Helena
- Garret Dillahunt as Curtis
- Pedro Vicuña as Lucho
- Anita Reeves as Mother
- David Olguiser as Son
- Teresa Berríos as Grandmother
- Roberto "El Rumpy" Artiagoitia as Gangster
- Elizabeth Gomez Aguilera (Ely Sanders) as the cashier

== Release dates ==
- 3 January 1999 – Chile
- 8 August 1999 – United States (Hollywood Film Festival)
- 5 June 2007 – DVD release in Canada and United States
