= Estúpido Cupido =

Chilean television series

- Genre: Romantic comedy
- Written by: Mário Prata
- Directed by: Régis Cardoso
- Starring: Leonardo Villar; Maria Della Costa; Françoise Forton; Ricardo Blat; Ney Latorraca; Elizabeth Savalla; Luiz Armando Queiroz; Nuno Leal Maia; Célia Biar; Kléber Macedo (ver mais)
- Opening theme: Estúpido Cupido – Celly Campello
- Ending theme: Estúpido Cupido – Celly Campello
- Country of origin: Brazil
- Original language: Portuguese
- No. of episodes: 160

Production
- Running time: 55 minutes

Original release
- Network: TV Globo
- Release: 25 August 1976 – 26 February 1977

Related
- Anjo Mau; Locomotivas

Estúpido Cupido is a Brazilian telenovela produced by TV Globo. It aired from 25 August 1976 to 26 February 1977 at 7pm. Written by Mário Prata and directed by Régis Cardoso, it was the last Globo telenovela recorded in black-and-white, with the exception of the last two chapters, directed by Walter Avancini using the then-new color technology.

It was the first telenovela written by Mário Prata. Due to the 1976 Olympic Games in Montreal, Estúpido Cupido debuted exceptionally on a Wednesday.

The telenovela was re-aired in Brazil starting in May 1979, at 2:00 p.m.

== Plot ==
The story takes place in the fictional city of Albuquerque, São Paulo, in the beginning of the 1960s. It revolves around the loves of youth, having as background the American music of the time: rock ballads and rock and roll. The teenagers study in the Catholic school Colégio Normal de Albuquerque, and many Nuns and Priests take part in the plot. Other subjects covered are: the prejudice suffered by a divorced woman (Olga Oliveira); the success of a rock band, Personélitis Boys, led by Antônio Ney Medeiros; Belchior, a clever but not very sane homeless man who runs an imaginary radio station daily from 11am–noon; Cabo Fidélis, a policeman; Acioly, a geologist prospecting for petroleum in the city region; and Alcides Guimarães Filho, the city mayor, owner of the Albuquerque Tênis Club where the high society of the city meet and party.

The external scenes were recorded in Itaboraí, Rio de Janeiro. With the success of the telenovela, there was a revival of the music style of the 50s and 60s, with twist dance competitions happening in several places across the country. The soundtrack album, produced by Som Livre, sold more than one million copies.

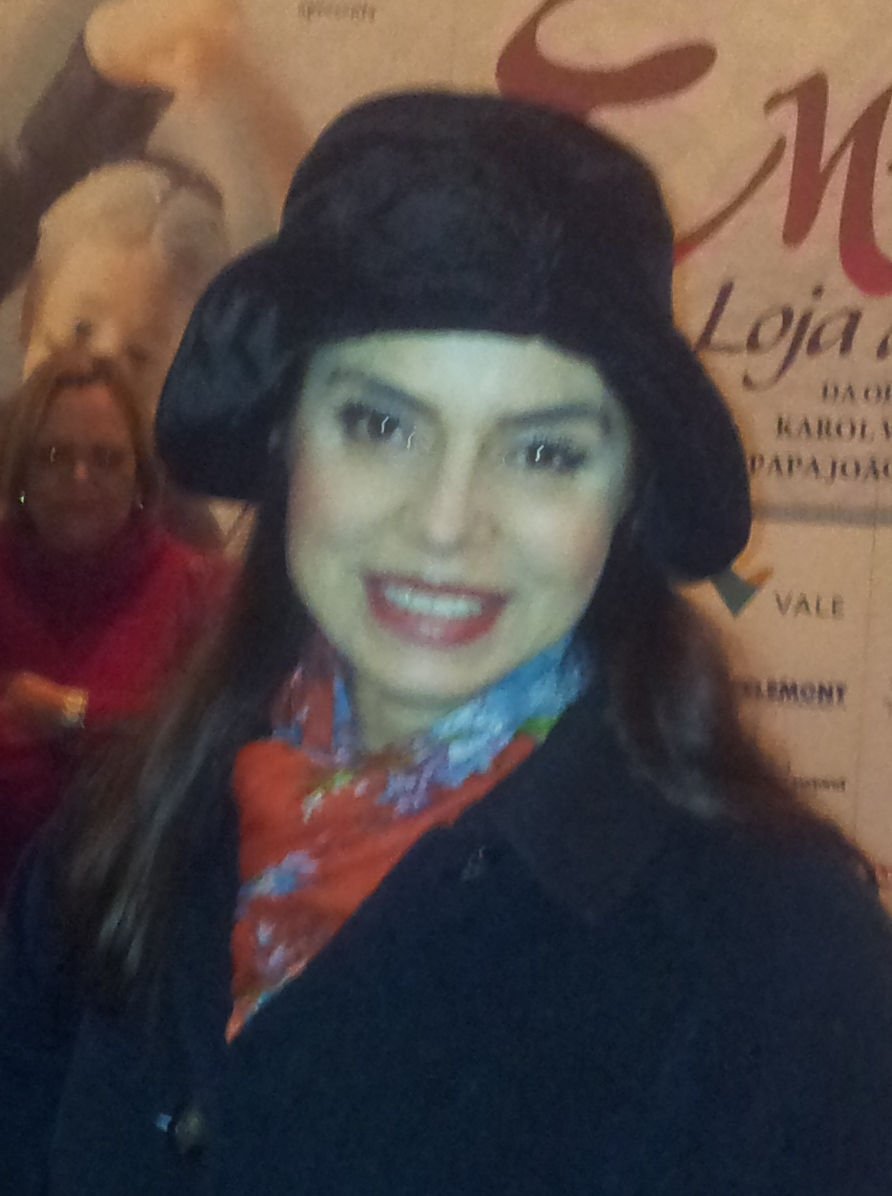
Françoise Forton

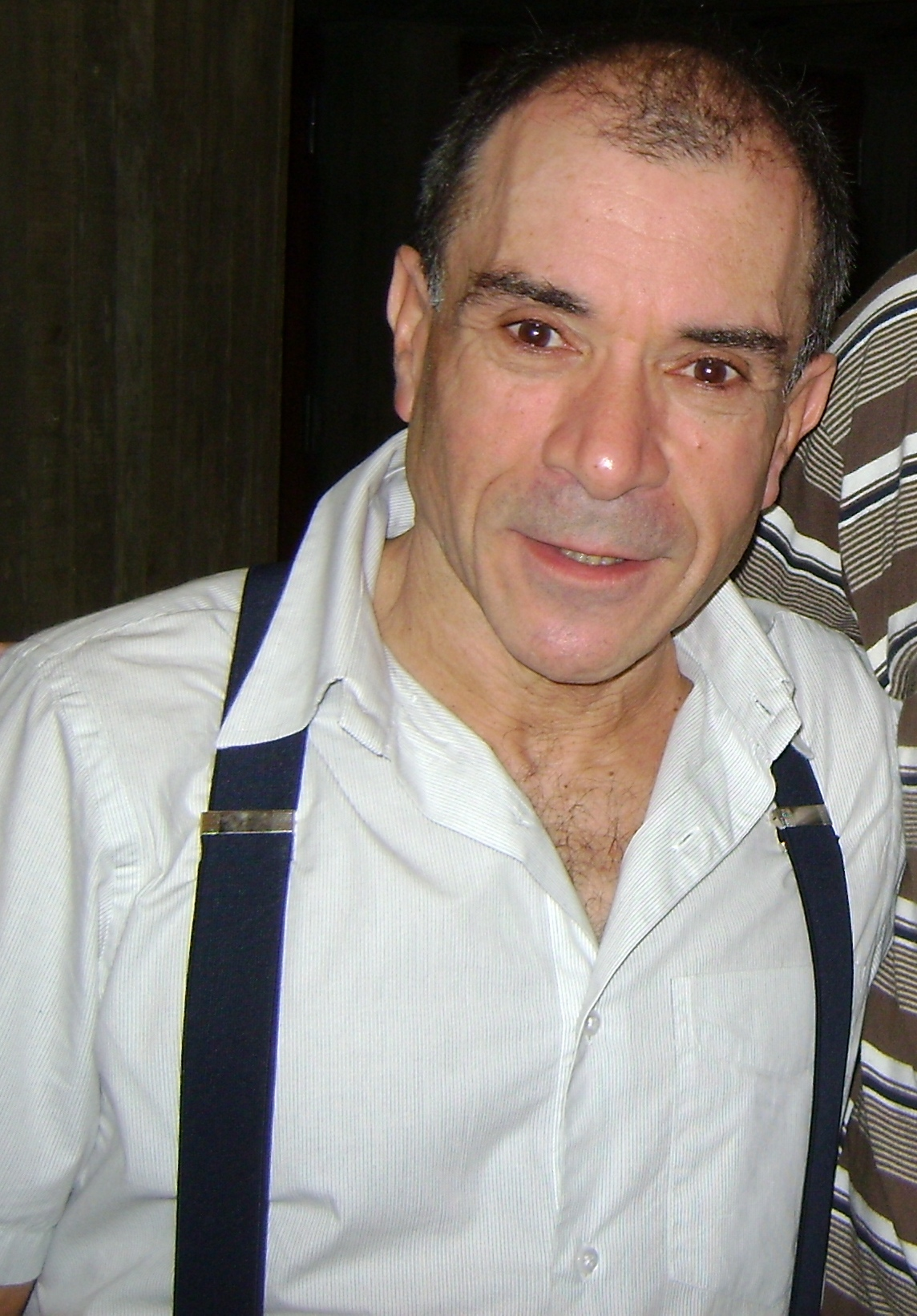
Ricardo Blat

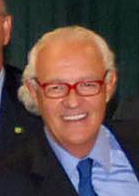
Ney Latorraca

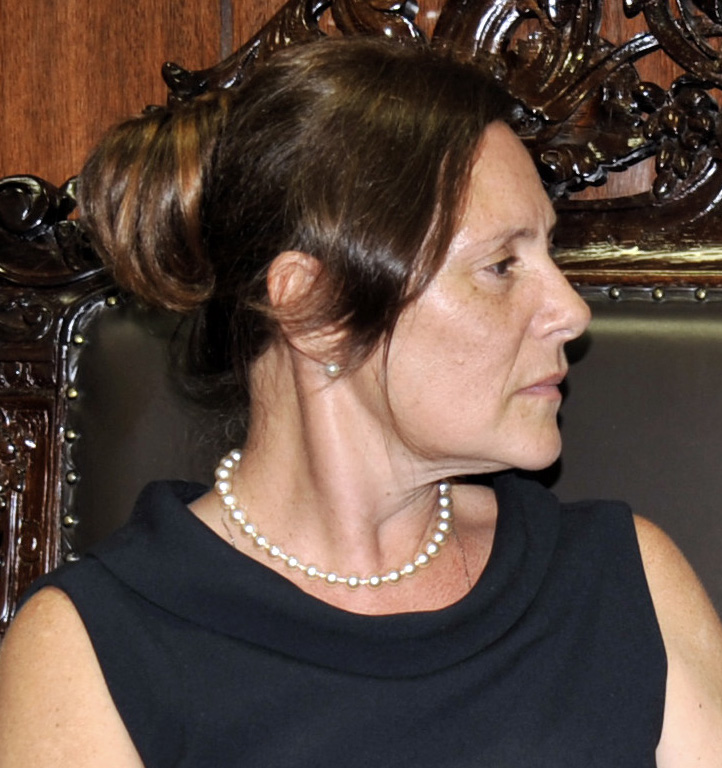
Elizabeth Savalla

== Cast ==
Actor	Character
Leonardo Villar	Alcides Guimarães Filho (Guima)
Maria Della Costa	Olga Oliveira
Françoise Forton	Maria Tereza Oliveira (Tetê)
Ricardo Blat	João Guimarães
Ney Latorraca	Antônio Ney Medeiros (Mederiquis)
Elizabeth Savalla	Sister Angélica
Luiz Armando Queiroz	Belchior
Nuno Leal Maia	Acioly
Heloísa Millet	Betina Oliveira
João Carlos Barroso	Joel Otávio Oliveira (Tavico / Caniço)
Djenane Machado	Glória Siqueira (Glorinha)
Oswaldo Louzada	Alcides Guimarães (Guimão)
Célia Biar	Adelaide
Kléber Macedo	Eulália
Mauro Mendonça	Dr. Armando Siqueira (Tom Mix)
Marilu Bueno	Maria Antonieta Siqueira (Mariinha)
Luiz Orioni	Miguel Medeiros
Ida Gomes	Mother Encarnación
Antônio Patiño	Father Batista (Batistão)
Suely Franco	Sister Consuelo
Emiliano Queiroz	Father Almerindo
Vick Militello	Joana D'Arc da Silva (Daquinha)
Tony Ferreira	Cabo Fidélis
Ênio Santos	Aquino
Sônia de Paula	Ciça Oliveira
Zanoni Ferrite	Pedro (Pepê)
Patrícia Bueno	Suely
Carlos Kroeber	Friar Damasceno
Henriqueta Brieba	Creuza Oliveira (Vovó Zinha)
Arthur Costa Filho	Father Guido
Tião D'Ávila	Carneirinho
Heloísa Raso	Aninha
Ricardo Garcia Costa	José Maria Guimarães (Zé Maria)
Cláudio Ayres da Motta	Mr. Gordon
Marly Bueno	Miss Brazil pageant host

== Sound tracks ==
=== National ===
1. "Banho de Lua (Tintarella di luna)" – Celly Campello
2. "Quem É?" – Osmar Navarro
3. "Diana" – Carlos Gonzaga
4. "Meu Mundo Caiu" – Maysa
5. "Broto Legal" – Sérgio Murilo
6. "Alguém é Bobo de Alguém" – Wilson Miranda
7. "Por Uma Noite" – Stradivarius
8. "Ritmo da Chuva (The Rhythm of the Rain)" – Demétrius
9. "Boogie do Bebê" – Tony Campello
10. "Sereno" – Paulo Molin
11. "Neurastênico" – Betinho & Seu Conjunto
12. "Biquíni Amarelo (Itsy Bitsy Teenie Weenie Yellow Polka Dot Bikini)" – Ronnie Cord
13. "Tetê" – Sylvia Telles
14. "Bata Baby" – Wilson Miranda
15. "Ela é Carioca" – Os Cariocas
16. "Estúpido Cupido (Stupid Cupid)" – Celly Campello

=== International ===
1. "Breaking Up Is Hard to Do" – Neil Sedaka
2. "Love Me Forever" – The Playing's
3. "Be-Bop-A-Lula" – Gene Vincent
4. "Tutti Frutti" – Little Richard
5. "Ruby" – Ray Charles
6. "Twilight Time" – The Platters
7. "America" – Trini Lopez
8. "The Twist" – Chubby Checker
9. "Secretly" – Jimmy Rodgers
10. "Tears on My Pillow" – Little Anthony & The Imperials
11. "Misty" – Johnny Mathis
12. "April Love" – Pat Boone
13. "Multiplication" – Bobby Darin
14. "Don't Be Cruel" – Elvis Presley
15. "Petit Fleur" – Bob Crosby
16. "The Green Leaves of Summer" – The Brothers Four
17. "Puppy Love" – Paul Anka
18. "Al di là" – Emilio Pericoli
19. "Everybody Loves Somebody" – Dean Martin
20. "Bye Bye Love" – The Everly Brothers

== Chilean remake ==
Estúpido Cupido
- Created by: Jorge Marchant Lazcano
- Based on: Estúpido Cupido
- Written by: Mário Prata
- Directed by: Vicente Sabatini
- Starring: Claudia di Girolamo; Francisco Reyes; Carolina Fadic; Álvaro Rudolphy; Claudia Burr; Luis Alarcón; Jael Unger; Alejandro Castillo; Consuelo Holzapfel; Delfina Guzmán; Eduardo Barril; Ana Reeves; Mauricio Pesutic
- Opening theme: "Los Habitantes de San Andrés" (Medley)
- Country of origin: Chile
- Original language: Spanish
- No. of episodes: 110 approx.

Original release
- Network: TVN
- Release: 1995

In 1995, Chilean TVN produced a remake of the same name that takes place in the city of San Andrés, instead of Albuquerque. Directed by Vicente Sabatini, it was adapted by Jorge Marchant Lazcano with Víctor Carrasco and Hugo Morales.

This soap opera has multiple leading couples and concerns two main plotlines. In one, a love triangle forms among Monica Tagle (Carolina Fadic), Anibal Donoso (Álvaro Rudolphy) and Isabel Margarita Dublé (Claudia Burr). Isabel, the spoiled daughter of the mayor who falls in love with Anibal, schemes to have him beside her.

The other story features local radio announcer Jaime Salvatierra (Francisco Reyes) and Sister Angélica (Claudia Di Girolamo), an extrovert revolutionary nun who scandalizes the town. When the soap aired, it stirred controversy among church authorities in Chile and was the subject of debate, as Angélica may have left the habit and started a relationship with Jaime.

=== Cast ===
- Claudia di Girolamo as Sister Angélica
- Francisco Reyes as Jaime Salvatierra
- Carolina Fadic as Mónica Tagle
- Álvaro Rudolphy as Aníbal Donoso
- Claudia Burr as Isabel Margarita Dublé
- Luis Alarcón as Octavio Dublé
- Jael Unger as Luz Arlegui of Dublé
- Alejandro Castillo as Alfonso Campino
- Consuelo Holzapfel as Virginia Buzeta
- Delfina Guzmán as Mother Undurraga
- Eduardo Barril as Father Urbistondo
- Ana Reeves as Sister Rebeca
- Mauricio Pesutic as Father Benítez
- Silvia Piñeiro as Carlota Meza
- Anita Klesky as Matilde Meza
- José Soza as Waldo Retamal
- Patricia Rivadeneira as Gloria Manterola
- Amparo Noguera as Marta Davis
- Álvaro Morales as Ricardo Campino
- Alejandra Fosalba as Gaby Buzeta
- Felipe Braun as Daniel Meza
- Tamara Acosta as Marisol Tagle
- Pablo Schwarz as Gonzalo Tagle
- Valentina Pollarolo as Pamela Manterola
- Juan Pablo Bastidas as Marcelo Manterola
- Remigio Remedy as Sergio Torrealba
- Óscar Hernández as Pancracio Carmona
- Ximena Rivas as Felicia Manzano
- Francisco Melo as Peter O'Kelly
- Fernando Larraín as Guillermo Sandoval
- Mario Montilles as Mister Raimundo Campino
- Mireya Véliz as Mother Guadalupe
- Jorge Hevia Jr. as Benjamín Campino

==== Other cast ====
- Héctor Noguera as Mgr
- Berta Lasala as Mabel Fuentes
- Marcelo Romo as Miguel Santa Cruz
- Luz Jiménez as Raquel of Meza
- Ana Luz Figueroa as Rocío Montes
- Pablo Ausensi as César Leiva "Cupid"
- Maité Fernández as Provincial Mother
- Jaime Davagnino as Marcial
- Sonia Mena as Aunt of Mónica's
- Pedro Villagra as Fernando
