= Mireya Véliz =

Chilean actress (1915–2013)

Mireya Véliz (1915 – 5 September 2013) was a Chilean actress with a career of more than 50 years, retiring at the age of 96.

== Career ==
Véliz was featured in some of the first televised TV-theatre productions in Chile which were directed by Hugo Miller for Chile's Channel 13.

Before working in television she spent a number of years writing, directing and producing theatre for children. She later became part of the Teatre Ensayo which was a major University theatre company in Chile. Within this company she wrote radio-theatre and worked on the program La Voz de America which was recorded in the U.S. embassy.

In 1986 she was in the cast of the Universidad Catolica theatre production of Juan Radrigan’s El Pueblo de mal amor alongside other prominent actors such as Patricio Strahovsky and Gabriela Medina. The play’s theme inspired by real events dealt with homelessness, displacement and exile and interplayed with the biblical themes of exile and the Promised Land.

Véliz worked in several television series in Chile; her last major role was in the popular telenovela Corazon de María, where she played the role of “Modesta” the mother of “Salvador” (Mauricio Pesutic).

== Filmography ==
TV production and Films	Role	Year
Prohibido pisar las nubes	Clara	1970
Una familia feliz	Mireya	1982
Sor Teresa de los Andes	María Cáceres	1989
El milagro de vivir		1990
Acércate más	Tita	1990
Trampas y Caretas	Adela	1992
Jaque Mate	Amelia	1993
Rompecorazón	Saruca	1994
Estúpido Cupido	Mother Guadalupe	1995
Sucupira	Hilda Llantén	1996
Oro Verde	Guadalupe	1997
Iorana	Nua Eva	1998
La Fiera	Corita	1999
El chacotero sentimental	Tota	1999
Romané	Inés Suárez	2000
Pampa Ilusión	Bristela Monardes	2001
El Circo de las Montini	Rebeca, widow of Rubio	2002
Puertas Adentro	Grandmother Moraga	2003
Los Pincheira	Clementina Perez	2004
El Perro Hortelano	Mother of Antonio	2004
Cómplices	Biological Mother of Harvey	2006
La abuela de Max	Eloísa	2006
Corazón de María	Modesta, widow Ceballos	2007
Infiltradas	Mother of Nelson	2011
