= Amnesia (1994 film) =

1994 film

- Film poster
- Directed by: Gonzalo Justiniano
- Written by: Gonzalo Justiniano
- Starring: Julio Jung
- Release date: 27 June 1994
- Running time: 90 minutes
- Country: Chile
- Language: Spanish

Amnesia is a 1994 Chilean drama film directed by Gonzalo Justiniano. The film was selected as the Chilean entry for the Best Foreign Language Film at the 67th Academy Awards, but was not accepted as a nominee.

== Plot ==
After years of searching, Ramirez, a former soldier tormented by his conscience, manages to track down his former army sergeant, Zúñiga, under whose cruel orders he served as a guard at a prisoner camp in the desert after the military coup of 1973. Over some drinks, Ramírez forces Zúñiga to recall a violent past that he believed he had left behind, unaware that the seemingly cordial reunion is part of Ramírez's plan to take revenge on him for the sake of his victims.

== Cast ==
- Julio Jung as Zúñiga
- Pedro Vicuña as Ramírez
- José Secall as Carrasco
- Marcela Osorio as Marta
- Myriam Palacios as Yolanda
- José Martin as Alvear
- Nelson Villagra as Captain Mandiola

== See also ==
- List of submissions to the 67th Academy Awards for Best Foreign Language Film
- List of Chilean submissions for the Academy Award for Best Foreign Language Film
