= B-Happy =

- Theatrical release poster
- Directed by: Gonzalo Justiniano
- Written by: Gonzalo Justiniano; Sergio Gómez; Daniela Lillo; Fernando Aragón
- Produced by: Carlo Bettin; Gonzalo Justiniano
- Starring: Manuela Martelli
- Cinematography: Andrés Garretón
- Edited by: Danielle Fillios; Guillermo Sánchez
- Music by: Cuti Aste
- Production company: Sahara Films
- Release dates: September 5, 2003 (TIFF); October 18, 2003 (FICV); January 8, 2004 (Chile)
- Running time: 90 minutes
- Countries: Chile; Spain; Venezuela
- Language: Spanish

B-Happy is a 2003 Chilean-Spanish-Venezuelan drama film directed by Gonzalo Justiniano and written by Justiniano, Sergio Gómez, Daniela Lillo and Fernando Aragón. It stars Manuela Martelli accompanied by Eduardo Barril, Lorene Prieto, Felipe Ríos and Ricardo Fernández.

== Synopsis ==
Kathy lives with her brother Danilo in a small coastal town in Chile. Her life is marked by the absence of her father, who is serving a sentence for multiple robberies, and by the permanent difficulties she must face. At the Lyceum, Kathy meets Chemo, a kind and sensitive boy. Together, they begin an intense relationship of mutual discovery. Meanwhile, Kathy falls into depression due to the increasing loneliness that surrounds her. It will be a painful process, but her strength of spirit and optimism will carry her through.

== Cast ==
The actors participating in this film are:

- Manuela Martelli as Katty
- Eduardo Barril as Radomir
- Lorene Prieto as Mercedes
- Juan Pablo Sáez as Francisco / Nina
- Gloria Laso as Gladis
- Ricardo Fernández as Chemo
- Juan Falcón as Nélson
- Felipe Ríos as Danilo
- Gabriela Hernández as Peta
- José Martin as Oscar
- Sergio Hernández as Franco
- Oscar Hernández as Albino
- Pedro Vicuña as Tulio
- Carmen Gloria Bresky as Flea
- Consuelo Edwards as Maira
- Sergio Buschmann as Police Officer

== Release ==
B-Happy had its world premiere on September 5, 2003, at the Toronto International Film Festival, then it was screened on October 18, 2003, as the opening film of the Valdivia International Film Festival. It was commercially released on January 8, 2004, in Chilean theaters, then screened on February 20, 2004, at the Mexico City International Film Festival.

== Reception ==
=== Critical reception ===
On the review aggregator website Rotten Tomatoes, 60% of 5 critics' reviews are positive, with an average rating of 6.4/10.

=== Accolades ===
Year	Award	Category	Recipient	Result	Ref.
2003	Havana New Latin American Film Festival	Second Choral Prize	B-Happy	Won	
2003	Havana New Latin American Film Festival	Best Actress	Manuela Martelli	Won	
2004	Bolivian Contemporary Film Festival	Best Actress	Manuela Martelli	Won	
2004	Santo Domingo International Film Festival	Best Actress	Manuela Martelli	Won	
2004	Santo Domingo International Film Festival	Best Screenplay	Gonzalo Justiniano, Sergio Gómez, Daniela Lillo & Fernando Aragón	Won	
2004	Santo Domingo International Film Festival	Best Cinematography	Andrés Garretón	Won	
2004	Buenos Aires International Festival of Independent Cinema	Festival Cultural Diversity Award	B-Happy	Won	
2004	International Film Festival of Cartagena de Indias	Best Film	B-Happy	Nominated	
2004	International Film Festival of Cartagena de Indias	Best Screenplay	Gonzalo Justiniano, Sergio Gómez, Daniela Lillo & Fernando Aragón	Won	
2004	International Film Festival of Cartagena de Indias	Best Supporting Actress	Lorene Prieto	Won	
2004	Berlin International Film Festival	CICAE Award - Best Film	B-Happy	Won	
2004	Berlin International Film Festival	IFFS-FICC - Special Mention	B-Happy	Won	
