= Prison in the Andes =

- Theatrical release poster
- Directed by: Felipe Carmona
- Written by: Felipe Carmona
- Produced by: Daniel Pech; Dominga Sotomayor; Omar Zúñiga
- Starring: Bastián Bodenhöfer; Hugo Medina
- Cinematography: Mauro Veloso
- Edited by: Olivia Brenga
- Music by: Mariá Portugal
- Production companies: Cinestación; Multiverso Produções
- Distributed by: Storyboard Media
- Release dates: October 6, 2023 (BFI); November 23, 2023 (Chile)
- Running time: 104 minutes
- Countries: Chile; Brazil
- Language: Spanish

Prison in the Andes (Spanish: Penal Cordillera) is a 2023 drama film written and directed by Felipe Carmona in his directorial debut. Starring Bastián Bodenhöfer and Hugo Medina accompanied by Andrew Bargsted, Mauricio Pesutic, Alejandro Trejo, Óscar Hernández, Daniel Alcaíno and Juan Carlos Maldonado. It is about 5 military generals who participated in the Pinochet dictatorship and who are imprisoned in the "Penal Cordillera", a luxurious prison from which they will not want to leave when the government wants to transfer them to a regular prison.

Prison in the Andes had its world premiere at the 67th BFI London Film Festival on 6 October 2023, where it competed for the Sutherland Trophy.

== Synopsis ==
Five of the most cruel torturers of the Pinochet dictatorship are serving sentences of several centuries in a luxurious prison at the foot of the Andes. It is an enclosure with a swimming pool, gardens and aviaries where they are always watched by guards who look more like their employees. When a television crew interviews Contreras, one of the inmates, his statements have an unexpected impact. Fearing that they will be transferred to a common prison, the military will do everything possible to stay in place, unleashing delirium and violence in the middle of the mountains.

== Cast ==
The actors participating in this film are:

- Hugo Medina as Manuel Contreras
- Bastián Bodenhöfer as Miguel Krassnoff
- Alejandro Trejo as Odlanier Mena
- Mauricio Pesutic as Marcelo Moren Brito
- Óscar Hernández as Pedro Espinoza
- Daniel Alcaíno as Alcaide
- Andrew Bargsted as Navarrete
- Juan Carlos Maldonado as Galdames
- Nicolás Zárate as Castro

== Release ==
It had its world premiere on October 6, 2023, in the First Feature Competition section at the 67th BFI London Film Festival, then was screened on November 12, 2023, at the 49th Huelva Ibero-American Film Festival, on December 10, 2023, at the 28th International Film Festival of Kerala, on June 9, 2024, at the 39th Guadalajara International Film Festival and on August 10, 2024, at the 28th Lima Film Festival.

It was commercially released on November 23, 2023, in Chilean theaters.

== Accolades ==
Year	Award / Festival	Category	Recipient	Result	Ref.
2023	67th BFI London Film Festival	Sutherland Trophy	Prison in the Andes	Nominated	
2023	49th Huelva Ibero-American Film Festival	Golden Colon	Prison in the Andes	Nominated	
2023	49th Huelva Ibero-American Film Festival	Best Performance	Cast of Prison in the Andes	Won	
2023	28th International Film Festival of Kerala	Golden Crow Pheasant	Prison in the Andes	Nominated	
2023	28th International Film Festival of Kerala	Fipresci Award	Prison in the Andes	Won	
2024	26th Punta del Este International Film Festival	Best Director	Felipe Carmona	Won	
2024	15th Festival Internacional de Cinema da Fronteira	Special Mention - Official Jury Award	Prison in the Andes	Won	
2024	15th Festival Internacional de Cinema da Fronteira	Best Script	Felipe Carmona	Won	
2024	39th Guadalajara International Film Festival	Best Ibero-American Fiction Feature Film	Prison in the Andes	Nominated	
2025	9th Caleuche Awards	Best Leading Actor	Bastián Bodenhöfer	Won	
2025	9th Caleuche Awards	Best Leading Actor	Hugo Medina	Won	
2025	9th Caleuche Awards	Best Supporting Actor	Andrew Bargsted	Nominated	
2025	9th Caleuche Awards	Best Supporting Actor	Nicolás Zárate	Nominated	
