= Edgardo Bruna =

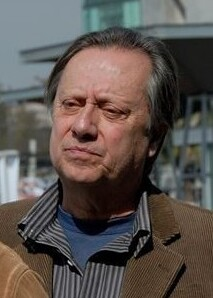
- Born: Edgardo Bruna del Campo; 8 February 1947; Santiago, Chile
- Died: 19 March 2017 (aged 70); Santiago, Chile
- Education: University of California, Berkeley
- Occupations: Actor, musician, theater director
- Years active: 1984–2017
- Spouse: Verónica Fruns

Edgardo Bruna del Campo (8 February 1947 – 19 March 2017) was a Chilean actor, musician, theater director, and social activist, recognized for his long career in various productions and plays.

He is known for his roles in telenovelas, playing the evil Fernando Bernard in Rojo y miel (1994), inspector Igor in Adrenalina (1996), the swindler Renacuajo in Tic Tac (1997), the patron of Fernando Guerra in Aquelarre (1999), Don Clinton in Amores de mercado (2001), and José Reyes in Purasangre (2002).

== Biography ==
Edgardo Bruna studied at the Liceo Experimental Manuel de Salas and the San Felipe Boys School. In 1963 he entered the acting profession at the University of Chile, where he had national theater figures as teachers, such as Patricio Bunster, Eugenio Guzmán, and Agustín Siré. Thanks to a scholarship, he traveled to the United States to perfect his skills in dramatic arts at the University of California, Berkeley, home of the hippie movement in the late 1960s. He decided to return to Chile in 1971 to be present in the government of President Salvador Allende. Later, after the 1973 coup d'état, he left for Mexico, where he lived for five years.

Before dedicating himself to acting, he was a musician and participated in the folk group Los Paulos, together with Pedro Messone. The group won the folkloric competition of the 1966 Viña del Mar International Song Festival with the song "La burrerita".

He made his television debut in 1984 on the Channel 13 telenovela Los títeres. During the 1990s he joined the dramatic area of TVN, and later worked for Chilevisión and Mega. He participated in series such as Los archivos del cardenal, Prófugos, Ecos del desierto, and Príncipes de barrio. His last role was in Casa de Angelis, recorded just before his death.

He was president of the Union of Actors and Actresses of Chile (Sidarte), president of the National Union of Artists, and counselor of Chileactores. In 2013 he was a candidate for regional councilor representing the Progressive Party for the Santiago Metropolitan Region. However, he was not elected.

He died on 19 March 2017 at age 70, after suffering a heart attack at home at 4:00 p.m. On 22 March, the Senate of Chile paid tribute to him for his work in the actors' union and his active participation in the preparation of the project which created the Ministry of Science and Technology.

== Filmography ==
=== Films ===
- ¡Viva el novio! (1990)
- Dos mujeres en la ciudad (1990) – Professor
- Amelia Lópes O'Neill (1991)
- El seductor (2004) – Catar
- El socio (2004) – Walter Davis
- Las golondrinas del altazor (2006)
- The Black Pimpernel (2007) – Hotel proprietor
- Oculto en la oscuridad (2007) – Father of Mariana
- Teresa (2009) – Federico Wilms
- La lección de pintura (2011) – Bechard
- Aftershock (2012) – Grumpy operator
- El vuelo de los cuervos (2013) – Don Efraín
- El árbol magnético (2013) – Tata
- El inquisidor (2015) – Gaspar
- Pinochet boys (2016)
- You'll Never Be Alone (2016) – Bruno

=== Telenovelas ===
Year	Title	Role	Channel
1984	Los títeres	Julio Barros	Channel 13
1986	Secreto de familia	Sebastián Williams	Channel 13
1990	El milagro de vivir	Camilo	TVN
1990	Acércate más	Mauricio	Channel 13
1991	Volver a empezar	Germán Yáñez	TVN
1992	Fácil de amar	Raúl	Channel 13
1993	Jaque mate	Ernesto Quesney	TVN
1993	Ámame	Sergio Hernández	TVN
1994	Rojo y miel	Fernando Bernard	TVN
1995	Amor a domicilio	Raúl Díaz	Channel 13
1996	Adrenalina	Igor Hormazábal	Channel 13
1997	Tic Tac	Renato Puig "El Renacuajo"	TVN
1998	Borrón y Cuenta Nueva	León Costa	TVN
1999	Aquelarre	Fernando Guerra	TVN
2000	Santo ladrón	Federico Quiroga	TVN
2001	Amores de mercado	Manfred Midesraub "El Clinton"	TVN
2002	Purasangre	José Reyes "El rey del Monte con huesillo"	TVN
2003	Pecadores	Safanor Pérez	TVN
2004	Destinos cruzados	Raimundo Goycolea	TVN
2005	Versus	Nuncio Chaparro	TVN
2006	Floribella	Eugenio Zaldívar	TVN
2006	Disparejas	Tololo Romero	TVN
2007	Amor por accidente	Ernesto Urrutia	TVN
2008	Hijos del Monte	Eleuterio Mardones	TVN
2009	Los Ángeles de Estela	Máximo Alcázar	TVN
2011	Peleles	Fernando Varas	Channel 13
2011	Maldita	Joaquín Ibáñez	Mega
2012	Dama y obrero	Mariano Villavicencio	TVN
2013	Secretos en el jardín	Aníbal Lastra	Channel 13
2014	Valió la pena	Raúl García	Channel 13
2014	Pituca Sin Lucas	Exequiel Santibáñez	Mega
2015	Eres mi tesoro	Ángel Riquelme	Mega

=== TV series and specials ===
Year	Title	Role	Channel
1996	Madre e hijo	Roberto	TVN
1997	Brigada Escorpión	Leyton	TVN
1998	Mi abuelo, mi nana y yo	The director	TVN
1999	Los Cárcamo	Alfonso Irarrázabal	Canal 13
2005/2006	Tiempo final: en tiempo real	Ángel / Father of Karina	TVN
2006	El aval	Inspector Losada	TVN
2008	Paz	Domingo Santa María	TVN
2010	La Tirana	Ramiro Eyzaguirre	TVN
2010	Adiós al séptimo de línea	Joaquín Godoy Cruz	Mega
2011	12 días que estremecieron Chile	Orlando Sotomayor / Roberto Parada	Chilevisión
2011	Cartas de mujer	President Arturo Alessandri	Chilevisión
2011–2013	Prófugos	Luis Serrano	HBO
2011–2014	Los archivos del cardenal	Marcos Sarmiento	TVN
2012	El diario secreto de una profesional	Ricardo García	TVN
2012	Vida por vida	Dr. Sergio Mackenna	Channel 13
2012	Solita camino	Pedro Pablo	Mega
2013	Maldito corazón	Juan Aníbal	Chilevisión
2013	Ecos del desierto	General Joaquín Lagos	Chilevisión
2014	Los 80	Arturo González	Canal 13
2015	Príncipes de barrio	Francisco Elizalde	Canal 13
2017	12 días que estremecieron Chile	Miguel Mejías	Chilevisión
2017	Papá mono	Eduardo Figueroa	Canal 13
2018	Casa de Angelis		TVN

=== Music videos ===
Year	Title	Artist	Director
2010	"Cabros"	Álex Anwandter	Álex Anwandter

== Theater ==
- La Celestina (1982) – director
