= Lorene Prieto =

Chilean singer and actress

- Born: New Zealand
- Occupation: Actor
- Known for: Film, television and stage musical

Lorene Prieto is a Chilean-New Zealand film, stage and television actor.

== Life ==
Prieto was born in New Zealand and raised in Switzerland, and studied acting at a theatre school in Chile.

Prieto starred in the 1999 film El Chacotero Sentimental, which became her most famous role. The same year, she starred in an erotic drama, Last Call. She also appeared in 2003 in the film B-Happy, a role which won her the best actress award at the Cartagena de Indias Festival in Colombia.

In 2012 Prieto starred in a mini-series for television based on the life of convicted murderer María del Pilar Pérez, Maldita.

In 2013 Prieto appeared in a musical theatre stage show Blanca Nieves.
