= Candy or Mint =

1990 Chilean film

- Chilean theatrical release poster
- Spanish: Caluga o Menta
- Directed by: Gonzalo Justiniano
- Starring: Hector Vega Mauricio
- Cinematography: Gastón Roca
- Music by: Jaime de Aguirre
- Release date: 1990
- Running time: 100 minutes
- Countries: Chile, Spain
- Language: Spanish

Candy or Mint (Spanish: Caluga o Menta [translation: Toffee or Mint]), also known as El Niki, is a 1990 Chilean crime drama directed by Gonzalo Justiniano and one of the country's first post-Pinochet dictatorship films. In 1991 it became the first Chilean film to be nominated for the Goya Award in the category of best Ibero-American film.

== Summary ==
The film provides an accurate and gritty portrayal of the lives of a group of young people from the marginalized neighborhoods of Santiago. Niki and his friends are unemployed, with nothing to do, and quickly get caught up in the world of drugs and crime. During one of their adventures, Niki meets Manuela, his love interest who is known as "crazy".

== Cast ==
- Hector Vega Mauricio
- Patricia Rivadeneira
- Aldo Parodi
- Myriam Palacios
- David Olguiser
- Rodrigo Gijon
- Cecilia Godoy
- Rodrigo Peña
- Luis Alarcón

== Reception and analysis ==
Juan Silva-Escobar wrote in Izquierdas that the film opens with a sign that reads: "At the end of the eighties, one in three young Chileans fell into the category of what we commonly call marginalized." He goes on to set the narrative for the movie: after the credits roll, we see a vacant lot occupied by four young men; lounging around on a tire, a piece of cardboard, an old beach chair, and a sofa. One of the boys is sniffing glue, while another is tossing stones at a glass of water on the hood of a car. "It's hot. The space is dry and suffocating. It is a deserted urban space where these marginalized young people spend the afternoon, the days."

Patricia Rivadeneira opined that "Justiniano has the extraordinary ability to discover talents and also to tell great, endearing stories that go beyond the political, the contingent, and that endure over time." In 1991 it became the first Chilean film to be nominated for the Goya Award in the category of best Ibero-American film.

Magda Eriz wrote in Alpha that this "is a film from the early stages of the Chilean transition that depicts the state of the population after the dictatorship." They go on to state the film shows "unemployed youth who steal and make some money from the illegal sale of marijuana."

== See also ==
- Cinema of Chile
- Chilean LGBTQ cinema
- List of Chilean films
- Latin American cinema
