= Carolina Fadic =

Chilean actress

- Born: Carolina Fadic Maturana; February 27, 1974; Santiago, Chile
- Died: October 12, 2002 (aged 28); Santiago, Chile
- Occupation: Actress
- Years active: 1994–2002
- Spouse: Gabriel del Carril (1995–2001)
- Children: Pedro del Carril Fadic (1996)

Carolina Fadic Maturana (Santiago, February 27, 1974 – ibid, October 12 of 2002) was an actress and television presenter from Chile. She started her career when she was only 19 years old, when she was chosen by the director Vicente Sabatini to star in his successful productions of the 1990s. She played the main role in the telenovelas Rompecorazón (1994), Estúpido cupido (1995), Oro verde (1997), Algo está cambiando (1999) and Sabor a ti (2000), since then it began to be considered as one of the most profitable actresses in the television industry. Her debut in cinema was with the film La rubia de Kennedy by director Arnaldo Valsecchi, and her last film was Antonia (2001). On television, she was also one of the hosts of the entertainment program Primer plano. Fadic died on October 12, 2002, due to a stroke, while she was at the height of her career when she was only 28 years old. Her unexpected death caused grief and commotion in Chile.

== Filmography ==
=== Film ===
Films
Year	Film	Character	Director	Notes
1995	La rubia de Kennedy	Rubia de Kennedy	Arnaldo Valsecchi	Protagonista
1999	Los secretos	Antonella "Nella"	Fernando Guarinello	
2000	Monos con navaja	Josefina	Stanley Gonczanski	Reparto
2001	Antonia	Antonia Moltedo	Mariano Andrade	Protagonista (con Jorge Zabaleta)

=== Telenovelas ===
Telenovelas
Year	Telenovela	Rol	Channel
1994	Rompecorazón	Camila Sullivan Montané	TVN
1995	Estúpido Cupido	Mónica Tagle Buzeta	TVN
1997	Oro Verde	Antonia Sandoval Schmidt	TVN
1998	Iorana	Paula Novoa Lira	TVN
1999	Algo está cambiando	Karen Steinlein	Mega
2000	Sabor a ti	Ángela Herrera Quevedo	Canal 13
2001	Piel canela	Katina Berger	Canal 13
