= Celly Campello =

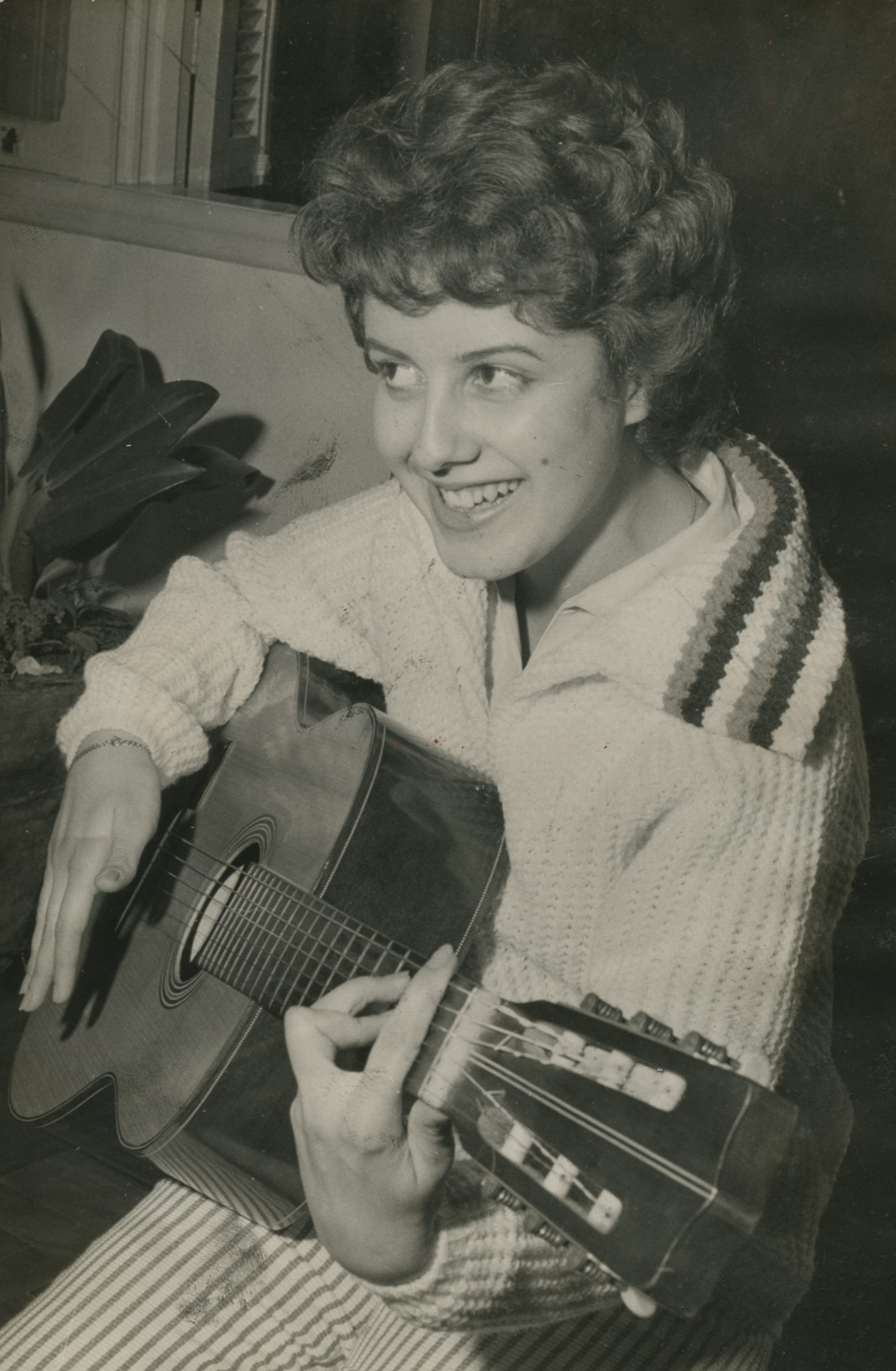

Background information
- Born: Célia Benelli Campello; June 18, 1942; São Paulo, São Paulo, Brazil
- Died: 4 March 2003 (aged 60) Campinas, São Paulo, Brazil
- Genres: Rock and roll; rhythm and blues
- Occupations: Singer; actress
- Instruments: Vocals; guitar; piano
- Years active: 1958–1962; 1968–1977
- Labels: Odeon; Continental; RCA Victor

Célia Campello Gomes Chacon (née Célia Benelli Campello; 18 June 1942 – 4 March 2003), known by her stage name Celly Campello, was a Brazilian singer and performer, a pioneer in Brazilian rock. She also acted in the telenovela Estúpido Cupido.

== Life ==
Campello was born in São Paulo and raised in Taubaté. She started her career in an early age, performing at local radio shows when she was six years old. She studied piano, classical guitar and ballet during her childhood.

Campello presented her own radio show when she was 12, at Rádio Cacique. In 1958 she recorded her first vinyl in São Paulo together with her brother Tony Campello who accompanied her in most of her career. Her debut in television was at TV Tupi's Campeões do Disco, in 1958. In 1959 she and Tony presented Celly e Tony em Hi-Fi, at Rede Record, until 1961.

Her breakthrough was in 1959 with the single Estúpido Cupido, the Brazilian version of Stupid Cupid. That same year she was featured in Mazzaropi's feature, Jeca Tatu. Another Campello's songs were Lacinhos Cor de Rosa, Billy and Banho de Lua (a version of Tintarella di luna by Mina).

Campello left the career in 1962, and moved to Campinas. She married José Eduardo Gomes Chacon, and had two children. In 1975 Campello had a brief comeback, presenting with her brother Tony at the Hollywood Rock festival in Rio de Janeiro. In 1976 she had a cameo appearance at TV Globo telenovela Estúpido Cupido, featuring her music in the soundtrack.

Campello died on 4 March 2003 of breast cancer, in Campinas.

Celly Campello was portrayed by Brazilian actress Marianna Alexandre in the 2022 biographical film Um Broto Legal.

== Discography ==
=== Odeon LPs ===
- 1959: Come Rock With Me
- 1960: Broto Certinho
- 1960: A Bonequinha que Canta
- 1961: A Graça de Celly Campello e as Músicas de Paul Anka
- 1961: Brotinho Encantador
- 1962: Os Grandes Sucessos de Celly Campello
- 1968: Celly
- 1973: Anos 60

=== RCA Victor LPs ===
- 1976: Celly Campello
- 1981: Disco de Ouro

== Filmography ==
- 1960: Zé do Periquito
- 1960: Jeca Tatu as Singer in pool (final film role)
- 1975: Ritmo Alucinante (Documentary) as herself
- 1977: Estúpido Cupido (TV Series) as herself
