= Chilean LGBTQ cinema =

LGBT+ Cinema

Chile has a growing body of national LGBT+ cinema.

== History and society ==
In the latter half of the 20th century, Daniel Emilfork, was considered the most prominent Chilean film actor both in Chile and internationally. He resettled in France in 1949, due to homophobic persecution in the country. The star of 2017's A Fantastic Woman, Daniela Vega, was the first transgender person to present at the Oscars.

Homosexuality in Chilean cinema is a subject that is rarely portrayed, with the first openly gay character appearing in 1990, but has been done in a more explicit way in the 21st century — CinemaChile's director Constanza Arena reflected in 2019 that only in the past eight years had filmmaking been able to diversify after dictatorship, giving the example of "the exploration of LGBT issues".

The 2017 release of A Fantastic Woman was said to have "reignited a conversation about trans rights in Chile", and ultimately was a deciding factor in the country passing Gender Identity Laws in 2018 after the filmmakers reportedly took its Oscar to then-President Michelle Bachelet.

=== Murder of Daniel Zamudio in film ===
The 2016 film Jesús tells the true story of a young gay man who was beaten to death in a park, matching this with the irony of two of his attackers engaging in gay sex shortly afterwards, with the director saying he wanted to show the complexity of the event and its and the killer's place in society; one of the real killers was also bisexual. He has also said that he would not label the film an LGBT film, because its young sexually-fluid protagonist does not label himself either. Álex Anwandter's Nunca vas a estar solo, released the same year, is based on the same event and also shows the bisexuality of one of the killers, using its narrative to challenge Chileans to look at their homophobia and question its origins. Both films ignore the "neo-nazi" rhetoric about the killers used in the news, to reflect that many regular Chileans held homophobic views.

== Films ==
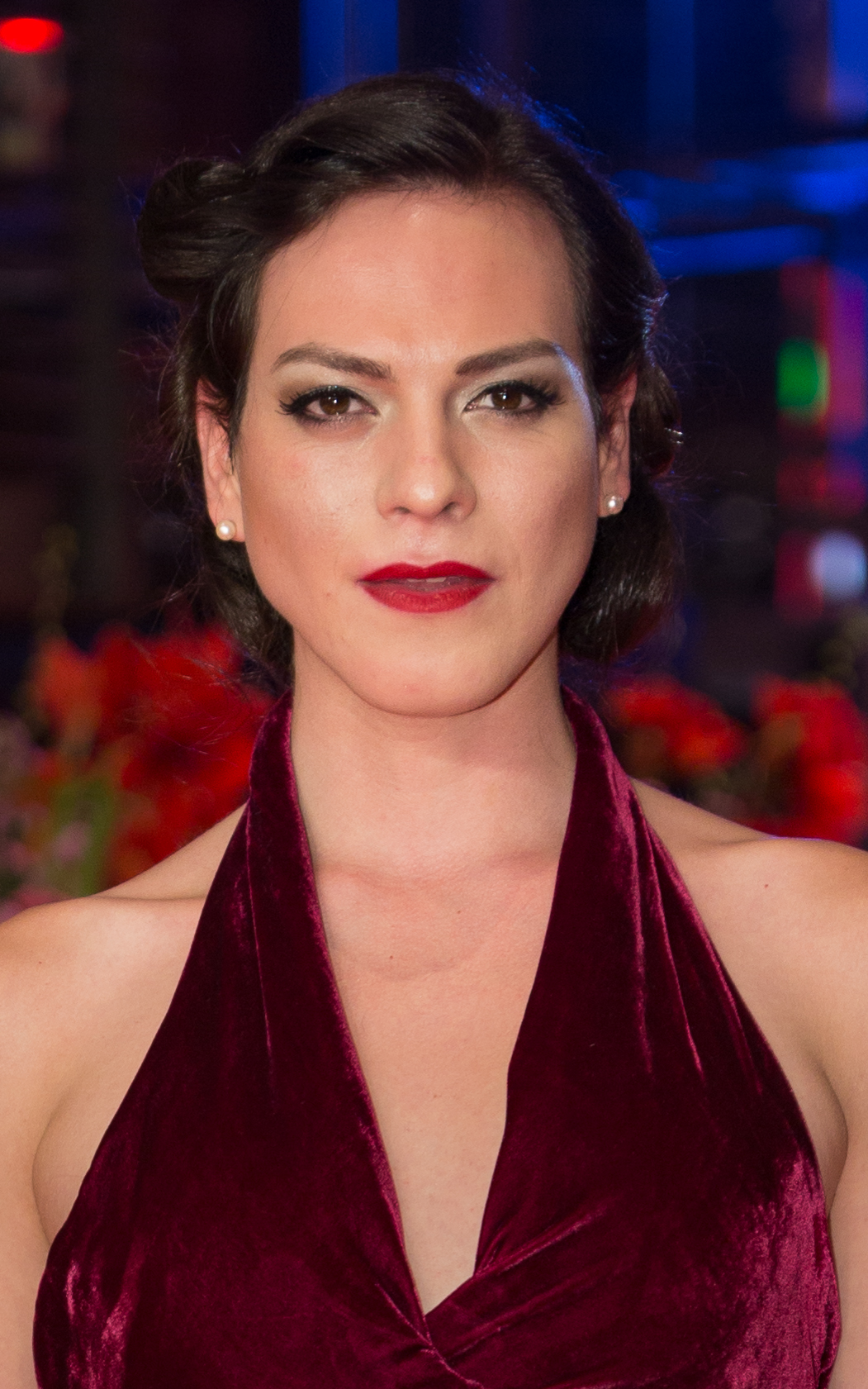
Daniela Vega, an openly transgender Chilean actress.

Year	Film title	Director	Notes
1990	Caluga o menta	Gonzalo Justiniano	Luis Alarcón stars as the first gay character
2002	El Regalo	Carmen García Pexo	short
2008	Muñeca	Sebastián Arrau	
2009	Lokas	Gonzalo Justiniano	
2010	Blokes		short
2010	Des/Esperando	Erick Salas Kirchhausen	
2010	Drama	Matias Lira	
2010	Otra película de amor	Edwin Oyarce	
2011	Mapa para conversar		
2012	Young and Wild (Joven y alocada)	Marialy Rivas	
2012	La Santa		short
2012	My Last Round (Mi último round)	Julio Jorquera Arriagada	
2013	Iglú	Diego Ruiz	
2013	Naomi Campbell	Camila José Donoso	
2013	Solsticio de primavera para un primer amor		short
2014	The Guest (La Visita)	Mauricio López Fernández	
2014	Plutón		short
2015	Aguas abajo		short
2015	He Hated Pigeons	Ingrid Veninger	Chilean-Canadian coproduction
2015	El hombre nuevo		documentary
2015	In the Grayscale (En la gama de los grises)	Claudio Marcone	
2015	Lost Queens (Locas Perdidas)	Ignacio Juricic	short; Winner of a Cannes Queer Palme
2015	Nasty Baby	Sebastián Silva	
2015	San Cristóbal	Omar Zuñiga	short - Winner of the Berlin Short award
2015	El Bosque de Karadima	Matias Lira	
2016	El Destello de la Luna (2016 film)	Gustavo Letelier	
2016	Jesús	Fernando Guzzoni	
2016	You'll Never Be Alone (Nunca vas a estar solo)	Álex Anwandter	
2016	Rara	Pepa San Martín	
2016	The Devil's Magnificent	Nicolás Videla	Starring Chilean transgender actress Manuela Guevara
2016	Chameleon (Camaleón)	Jorge Riquelme Serrano	
2017	A Fantastic Woman (Una mujer fantástica)	Sebastián Lelio	Won the Academy Award for Best Foreign Language Film
2018	Cola de Mono	Alberto Fuguet	
2018	Disobedience	Sebastián Lelio	
2019	Lemebel	Joanna Reposi Garibaldi	Documentary
2019	Enigma	Ignacio Juricic	
2019	The Prince (El principe)	Sebastián Muñoz	
2019	The Strong Ones (Los Fuertes)	Omar Zuñiga	
2020	My Tender Matador (Tengo miedo torero)	Rodrigo Sepúlveda	
2020	Shining Moon Director's Cut	Gustavo Letelier	

== See also ==
- LGBT culture in Chile: Cinema
