= Tic Tac (TV series) =

- Genre: Telenovela
- Written by: Jorge Marchant Lazcano; Perla Devoto; Maité Chapero; Jimmy Daccarett
- Directed by: María Eugenia Rencoret
- Starring: Enrique Cintolesi; Leonor Varela; Bastián Bodenhöfer; Ximena Rivas; Coca Guazzini; Mauricio Pesutic; Peggy Cordero
- Opening theme: "Another One Bites the Dust" (Queen)
- Country of origin: Chile
- Original language: Spanish
- No. of episodes: 95

Original release
- Network: TVN

Tic Tac is a Chilean telenovela produced by TVN. It was written by Jorge Marchant Lazcano, Perla Devoto, Maité Chapero and Jimmy Daccarett, and directed by María Eugenia Rencoret.

The soundtrack of the soap opera was based primarily on the album Tributo a Queen, with cover versions of songs by the group interpreted by the Latin artists Illya Kuryaki & The Valderramas, Soda Stereo, Molotov, Fito Paez and Aterciopelados.

== Plot ==
After a seance, the ghost of a young high-class young man, Maximilian Ossa, (Enrique Cintolesi), who died in very strange circumstances, comes from 1925 to 1997 to recover the love of his beloved Pola Santa Maria (Leonor Varela).

In 1997, Pola is the great-niece of his beloved, and physically identical with the same name, with whom he falls in love. There is also a named Nicolas (Francisco Pérez-Bannen) Hunt Mysteries who, for his radio program, Magik Radio, tries to prove that Max is a ghost, well away from Pola, who also is in love.

== Cast ==
- Enrique Cintolesi - Maximiliano Ossa
- Leonor Varela - Pola Santa María
- Bastián Bodenhöfer - Tomás Barcelona
- Ximena Rivas - Eva Félix
- Coca Guazzini - Ivana Gabor
- Mauricio Pesutic - Ángel Mendizábal / Ángela Smith
- Peggy Cordero - Emilia Santa María
- Jaime Vadell - Samuel Gaete
- Anita Klesky - Rosario Pascal
- Ana Reeves - Victoria Grant
- Edgardo Bruna - Renato Puig
- Adriana Vacarezza - Calú Barcelona
- Solange Lackington - Iris Valdés
- Francisco Pérez-Bannen - Nicolás Urrutia
- Alejandra Fosalba - Samantha Rouge
- Roberto Artiagoitía - Memo
- Mónica Godoy - Isidora Ortúzar
- Yuyuniz Navas - Romina Gaete
- Nicolás Fontaine - Matías Mendizábal
- Remigio Remedy - Gaspar "Roca" García
- Pamela Villalba - Dominique Aldunate
- Paulo Meza - Charly Troncoso
- Paola Volpato - Jocelyn Miranda
- Claudio Arredondo - Antonio "Toño"
- Blanca Lewin - Macarena Mendizábal
- Íñigo Urrutia - Ignacio García
- Carola Derpsch - María José Donoso
- Pedro Villagra - José María
- Jorge Hevia Jr. - Diego Gaete
- Antonella Orsini - Aurora Aldunate
- Clemente Gómez - Andrés Mendizábal
