= Claudia Burr =

Chilean actress

- Born: Claudia Andrea Burr Huerta; October 1, 1968 (age 57); Santiago, Chile
- Occupation: Actor
- Years active: 1992–present

Claudia Andrea Burr Huerta (Santiago, October 1, 1968) is a Chilean film and television actress.

Her first appearance on television was in Marrón Glacé telenovela on Channel 13. She stood out in the television series Estúpido Cupido on Televisión Nacional de Chile (1995), where she played the beloved antagonist, Isabel Margarita Dublé. In 1999 participates in the TVN television series Aquelarre where he plays Eduarda Patiño.

In 2000, after participating in the telenovela Santo ladrón, Burr left Chilean television and moved to live in France, where she worked making documentaries and playing small roles in short films. Her return to television took place in 2004, with the telenovela Tentación. From that date on, she was in productions of different Chilean channels and acted in two national films: Grado 3 in 2009, and Baby Shower in 2011.

Between 2012 and 2016 the actress lived in Lund, southern Sweden, with her partner, the photographer Mario Salazar. In that country, she acted in the SVT miniseries Viva Hate.

== Filmography ==
=== Films ===
Films
Year	Film	Role	Director
2009	Grado 3	Marcela Iriberne	Roberto Artiagoitía
2011	Baby Shower	Olivia	Pablo Illanes

=== Telenovela ===
Telenovela
Year	Telenovela	Character	Role	Channel
1993	Marrón Glacé	Andrea	Reparto	Canal 13
1994	Champaña	Odette Camaño	Reparto	Canal 13
1995	Estúpido Cupido	Isabel Margarita Dublé	Antagónico	TVN
1996	Sucupira	Soledad Campos	Co-protagónico	TVN
1997	Oro verde	Anita Solari	Co-protagónico	TVN
1998	Iorana	Teresita Apablaza	Reparto	TVN
1999	Aquelarre	Eduarda Patiño	Antagónico	TVN
2000	Santo ladrón	Tita López	Reparto	TVN
2004	Tentación	Matilde García	Co-protagónico	Canal 13
2005	Gatas y tuercas	Adriana del Real	Co-protagónico	Canal 13
2007	Fortunato	Chichita Subercaseaux	Antagónico	Mega
2010	40 y tantos	Tatiana Arismendi	Antagónico	TVN
2012	Maldita	Maribel Ibáñez	Co-protagónico	Mega

=== TV Series ===
TV series
Year	Serie	Role	Channel
1991	Las cosas de cada día		La Red
1996	La buhardilla	Constanza "Cony" Jaramillo	TVN
1998	Mi abuelo, mi nana y yo	Ruth López	TVN
2000–2002	Vigías del sur	Lorena	TVN
2014	Viva Hate	Madre de Juan	SVT
