= Anita Klesky =

Chilean actress and journalist

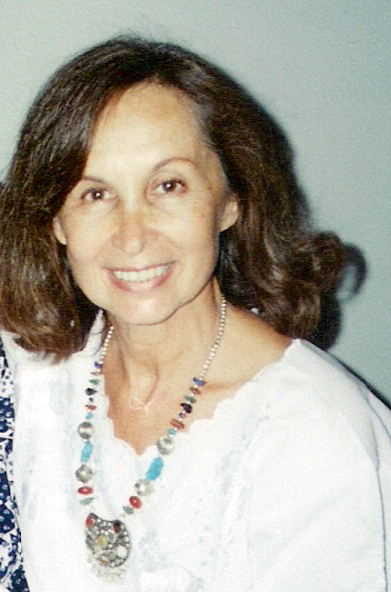
- Klesky in 1995
- Born: Ana Klecky Rapaport; November 10, 1937; Santiago de Chile
- Died: November 15, 2000 (aged 63)
- Education: University of Chile, Catholic University of Chile
- Occupations: Actress, journalist
- Spouse: Bernardo Trumper
- Children: 2

Ana Klecky Rapaport (Santiago, November 11, 1937 - November 15, 2000) better known as Anita Klesky was a Chilean actress and journalist.

== Biography ==
She was born in Santiago on November 10, 1937. She was the daughter of Abraham Klecky (d. 1947), of Belarusian origin, and Ester Rapaport Kuniche, of Jewish origin.

She studied theater at the Academy of Dramatic Arts of the Pontifical Catholic University of Chile (PUC). She graduated as an actress in 1955. In 1972, she entered the School of Journalism at the University of Chile, from which she graduated in 1976.

Anita Klecky married her former teacher, the renowned architect and set designer of the Teatro UC, Bernardo Trumper Roñis (b. 1929–d. 1997), in 1960. They had two sons: Juan Pablo Trumper Klecky and Leonardo Trumper Klecky, both architects.

In 1971, he joined the Teatro del Ángel company, where he remained until 1974.

Between 1974 and 1978, he participated in productions with the National Theater Company of the University of Chile.

In 1992, he joined Televisión Nacional de Chile (TVN), participating in several emblematic and diverse telenovelas directed by Vicente Sabatini and María Eugenia Rencoret. He was part of the Golden Age of TVN telenovelas.

In the early 1960s, he participated in various photo-novels for the magazine Cine Amor, where he and Héctor Noguera achieved early popularity.

In the mid-1970s, he worked as a journalist for the newspapers Las Últimas Noticias and Diario Financiero, for the television network Canal 9 of the University of Chile, and as a journalist and theater critic for Revista Bravo.

== Death ==
Anita Klesky died at her home in Providencia on November 15, 2000, from health complications related to her cancer treatment. In February, she had been diagnosed with a brain tumor and underwent surgery and radiation therapy at the Clínica Alemana in Santiago.

She was buried on November 16 in the Recoleta Jewish Cemetery, where she was accompanied by her mother, children, relatives, friends, and her closest artistic circle, and attended by directors and producers from Televisión Nacional (TVN), as well as the First Lady of the Republic, Luisa Durán.

On the day of her death, TVN broadcast an episode of Santo Ladrón dedicated to her memory.

== Filmography ==
=== Films ===
- 1968: Lunes 1, Domingo 7 (dir.: Helvio Soto)
- 1996: El último cierra la puerta (dir.: Marcela Catalán)

=== Television ===
Teleseries
| Year | Teleserie | Role | Channel |
|---|---|---|---|
| 1969 | La chica del bastón | Claudia Peña | Canal 13 |
| 1975 | J.J. Juez | Paula Garmendia | Canal 13 |
| 1981 | Casagrande | Laura Vidal | Canal 13 |
| 1982 | La Señora | Silvia | Canal 13 |
| 1983 | El juego de la vida | Carmen Salinas | Televisión Nacional |
| 1984 | La represa | Elvira Muñoz | Televisión Nacional |
| 1984 | La torre 10 | Yolanda Perutti | Televisión Nacional |
| 1987 | Mi nombre es Lara | Clara Velasco | Televisión Nacional |
| 1988 | Matilde dedos verdes | Georgina Riquelme | Canal 13 |
| 1989 | Bravo | Silvia González | Canal 13 |
| 1990 | Acércate más | Aída Urzúa | Canal 13 |
| 1992 | Trampas y caretas | Isidora Tuca Novoa | Televisión Nacional |
| 1993 | Jaque mate | Delfina Rioseco | Televisión Nacional |
| 1994 | Rompecorazón | Lucinda Ortiz | Televisión Nacional |
| 1995 | Estúpido cupido | Matilde Meza | Televisión Nacional |
| 1995 | Caminos cruzados | Leontina Órdenes | Televisa |
| 1995 | Juegos de fuego | Hortensia Zegers | Televisión Nacional |
| 1996 | Sucupira | Dora Lineros | Televisión Nacional |
| 1997 | Oro verde | Concepción Andrade-Farrut | Televisión Nacional |
| 1997 | Tic tac | Rosario Pascal | Televisión Nacional |
| 1998 | Iorana | Elena Valdés | Televisión Nacional |
| 1998 | Borrón y cuenta nueva | Adriana Domínguez | Televisión Nacional |
| 1999 | La Fiera | voz de radio | Televisión Nacional |
| 1999 | Aquelarre | Cándida Morales | Televisión Nacional |
| 2000 | Santo ladrón | Maya Sandoval | Televisión Nacional |

Series and miniseries
| Year | Serie | Role | Channel |
|---|---|---|---|
| 1970 | Martín Rivas | Matilde Elías | Televisión Nacional |
| 1970 | Cuarteto para instrumentos de muerte | Rossane O'Neill | Televisión Nacional |
| 1972 | La sal del desierto | Fedora | Televisión Nacional |
| 1998 | Sucupira, la comedia | Dora Lineros | |
| 1998 | Mi abuelo, mi nana y yo | Graciela | Televisión Nacional |
| 1999 | Sucupira, la comedia 2 | Dora Lineros | Televisión Nacional |

=== Theatre ===
- 1955: Navidad en el circo (dir.: Germán Becker, Teatro UC)
- 1959: El diálogo de las Carmelitas (dir.: Eugenio Dittborn, Teatro UC)
- 1959: El siciliano (dir.: Eugenio Dittborn, Teatro UC)
- 1960: La pérgola de las flores (dir.. Eugenio Guzmán, Teatro UC)
- 1961: Versos de ciego (dir.: Eugenio Dittborn, Teatro UC)
- 1961: La ronda de la buena nueva (dir.: Eugenio Guzmán, Teatro UC)
- 1962: Las travesuras del ordenanza Ortega (dir.: Fernando Colina, Teatro UC)
- 1963: Mucho ruido y pocas nueces (dir.: Eugenio Guzmán, Teatro UC)
- 1964: El Wurlitzer (dir.: Eugenio Dittborn, Teatro UC)
- 1965: Casimiro Vico (dir.: Fernando Colina, Teatro UC)
- 1966: Locos de verano (dir.: Fernando Colina, Teatro UC)
- 1970: La ronda (dir.: Eugenio Guzmán, Teatro Cariola)
- 1970: Tu sabes que no te puedo oír cuando el agua está corriendo (dir.: Domingo Tessier)
- 1971: Tres de última (dir.: Jaime Vadell, Teatro UC)
- 1971: Croni teatro (dir.: Eugenio Dittborn, Teatro UC)
- 1972: La profesión de la señora Warren (dir.: Alejandro Sieveking, Teatro del Ángel)
- 1972: La Celestina (dir.: Alejandro Sieveking, Teatro del Ángel)
- 1973: La virgen de la manito cerrada (dir.: Alejandro Sieveking, Teatro del Ángel)
- 1973: Cama de batalla (dir.: Alejandro Sieveking, Teatro del Ángel)
- 1974: Ja-Jaque mate (dir.: Alejandro Sieveking, Teatro del Ángel)
- 1975: La fantástica isla de los casi animales (dir.: Carlos Grave, Teatro Nacional)
- 1976: Orfeo y el último desodorante (dir.: Enrique Noisvander, Teatro Nacional)
- 1976: Don Juan Tenorio (dir.: Patricio Campos, Teatro Nacional)
- 1978: Rancagua 1814 (dir.: Patricio Campos, Teatro Nacional)
- 1978: El mercader de Venecia (dir.: Hernán Letelier, Teatro Nacional)
- 1979: Emily (Teatro Américo Vargas)
- 1980: Berlín 1930 (Teatro Américo Vargas)
- 1980: El boquete (dir.: Abel Carrizo, Teatro La Moneda)
- 1985: La comadre Lola (dir.: Alejandro Sieveking, Teatro El Carrusel)
- 1986: La muerte de un vendedor viajero (dir.: Tomás Vidiella)
- 1988: El amor, gran sueño del hombre (dir.: Eugenio Guzmán, Teatro Camilo Henríquez)
- 1989: El carrusel (dir.: Alejandro Sieveking, Teatro El Carrusel)
- 1989: Ingenuas palomas (dir.: Alejandro Sieveking, Teatro El Carrusel)
- 1992: Las brujas (dir.: José Andrés Peña, Teatro Duoc)
- 1993: Invitación a comer (dir.: Egon Wolff, Sala Apoquindo)
- 1994: Fair Play (Abel Carrizo, Teatro Nacional)
