= Mónica Godoy =

Chilean actress

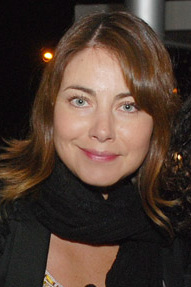
- Born: Mónica Alejandra Godoy Cabezas; 9 May 1976 (age 50); Santiago de Chile, Chile
- Occupation: Actress
- Spouse: Nicolás Saavedra
- Children: 2

Mónica Alejandra Godoy Cabezas (born May 9, 1976) is a Chilean actress. She was born in Santiago, and began her career at the Chilean channel Televisión Nacional de Chile. The actress was notably successful for her role of Scarlette in the telenovela Aquelarre. Godoy has been in the soap operas Hijos del Monte, 40 y Tantos and El Laberinto de Alicia.

== Biography ==
=== Career ===
She debuted on television as host on Canal 2 Rock & Pop, when she was 19 years. She subsequently participated in six successful dramatic productions of National Television of Chile, playing various characters that allowed Monica to demonstrate her talent and charisma.

Probably by the press, many people who know, know who was living in Barcelona. Left for this city on January 16, 2001, at the end of the recordings of Santo Ladrón, motivated to meet new concerns and find the tools to effectively perform as an actress and get the experience of living abroad. He also participated in the Spanish film XXL, directed by Julio Sánchez Valdés, next to Oscar Jaenada.

In 2004 he returned to Chile and back to the Televisión Nacional de Chile dramatic area to participate in dramatic productions Destinos Cruzados, uneven and Love by accident. In 2008 participated in Hijos del Monte, her portrayal of Julieta Millán caused great empathy in viewers, playing it down the lead role of María Elena Swett.

In 2010 production is part of the night 40 y Tantos, where she played Susana Jerez, the leading character's lover. Prosperiormente part in the TV series on Child Abuse, El Laberinto de Alicia, playing Bettina Molinari, sister of Alice.

During the 2011 is part of the winning National Television Council of Chile, with the production Bim Bam Bum and series El Diario Secreto de una Profesional (Adaptation of Secret Diary of a Call Girl). In the latter was chosen to play the lead in the series at first, but following the unexpected pregnancy had to leave the project due to the incompatibility of their status with the extension of the recordings.

== Filmography ==
Year	Title	Role	Other notes
1996	Sucupira	Loreto Inostroza	Soap Opera
1996	Loca Piel	Javiera Renán	Soap Opera
1997	Tic Tac	Isidora Ortúzar	Soap Opera
1998	Borrón y Cuenta Nueva	Marta Suárez	Soap Opera
1998	Mi Abuelo, Mi Nana y Yo	Bárbara Barros Luco	Television series
1999	Aquelarre	Scarlette Jara / Pía Montero	Soap Opera
2000	Santoladrón	Flavia Del Valle	Soap Opera
2002	Small White Dove		Film
2003	Gatos Placentarios		Short film
2004	XXL	Lidia	Film
2004	Pepe Carvalho	Jessica	Television series (2 Episodes)
2004	The South Seas		Film
2004	Destinos Cruzados	Colomba Rebacarren	Soap Opera
2005	Tiempo Final: En Tiempo Real	Gabriela	Television series (1 Episode)
2006	Disparejas	Claudia Arizmendi	Soap Opera
2007	Amor por Accidente	Celeste Sanhueza	Soap Opera
2008	Hijos Del Monte	Julieta Millán	Soap Opera
2009	Grado 3	Cristina	Film
2009	Una Pareja Dispareja	Vanessa	Television series (1 Episode)
2010	40 y Tantos	Susana Jerez	Soap Opera
2011	El Laberinto de Alicia	Bettina Molinari	Soap Opera
2013	Secretos en el Jardín	Carmen	Soap Opera
2017–2018	La Reina de Franklin	Camila Ossa	Soap Opera
