= Eduardo Barril =

Chilean actor and theatre director

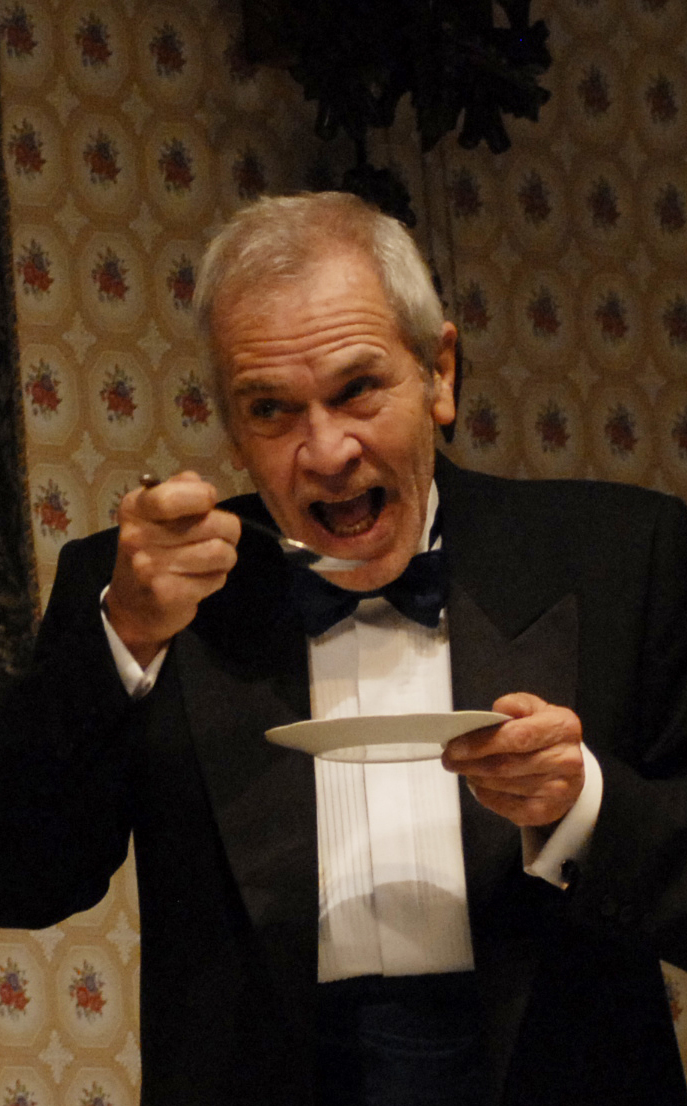
- Barril acting at Teatro UC in 2009
- Born: Eduardo Andrés Barril Villalobos; July 7, 1941 (age 84); Puerto Montt, Chile
- Occupations: Actor, theatre director

Eduardo Andrés Barril Villalobos (born July 7, 1941 in Puerto Montt) is a Chilean actor and theatre director.

== Biography ==
Born in Puerto Montt, he was the fourth of the seven children of Luis Barril Marquardt and Juana Villalobos Koghel.

He graduated from Theater School of the University of Chile in 1963. He joined the ITUCH (Theater Institute of the University of Chile) as a full-time actor, participating in plays such as "La remolienda" by Alejandro Sieveking, "El Círculo de Tiza Caucasiano" by Bertolt Brecht; "Romeo and Juliet" by William Shakespeare in Pablo Neruda's version; "Santa Juana" by George Bernard Shaw, "Waiting for Godot" by Samuel Beckett, among others. He also conducts acting classes and body language workshops in unions and cultural institutes and participates in the first tele-theater of the experimental television of the University of Chile with carbonatan.

In 1966 he travels to Panama. For 8 years, he performs on children's and miscellaneous programs on Channels 2 and 4. He travels the country doing cultural outreach work at the University of Panama, obtaining the National Mola de Oro Award in 1973. She graduated as Specialist in Audiovisual Communication at the University of Panama.

In 1974 he traveled to Italy to study at RAI (Italian Radio and Television) TV Direction. Back in Chile at the end of 1974, he takes Acting classes at the School of Theater of the University of Chile and workshops at different Communication Institutes and is titled as an actor. He is also dedicated to writing poetry, short stories, theater and television scripts. In 1975 he received an Honorable Mention from the Paula Magazine contest for his story "Osvaldo the boxer". As director, he premieres children's works and café-concert such as "Monsters in the fifth symphony" and "Matapasión", among others. In 1978 he directed "Requiem for a sunflower" by Jorge Díaz in Concepción. He participates in musicals on Martes 13, Humor on Sábado Gigante, TELEDUC and El Professor Rossa, all programs on Canal 13.

In telenovelas, his debut was in 1982 with Casagrande on Channel 13. In 1985, after his participation in Los títeres, he moved to Televisión Nacional de Chile, a station where he remained for more than 20 years integrating various casts of dramatic productions such as Mi nombre es Lara (1987), Bellas y audaces (1988), A la sombra del ángel (1989), Trampas y caretas (1992), Ámame (1993), Rompecorazón (1994), Oro verde (1997), Iorana (1998), Romané (2000), Pampa Ilusión (2001) e Ídolos (2004), among others. After a brief return to Channel 13, he moved away from television. The last television series he recorded was Graduados from Chilevisión in 2013.

As a theatre actor, he has also participated in the productions "The Bedrooms" by A. Ayckburn, Le Signe; "Becket" by Anouilh, and "Pachamama" by Saavedra; in "King Lear" by Shakespeare-Parra, "Waiting for Godot" by Beckett and "Joan of Arc" by Coca Duarte for the Theater of the Catholic University; and for the Chilean National Theater in "Fantasmas Borrachos" by Juan Radrigán and "Play with Fire" by August Strindberg, with a tour of Spain and Sweden in 1999. In 2003 he acted in "Provincia designated" directed by Rodrigo Pérez and "El Hijo "By Jon Fosse.

In June 2009 he premiered as an actor for the Theater of the Catholic University of Chile the play PANA, written by the playwright Andrés Kalawski and directed by Francisco Albornoz. During this montage, he met again with the actors Ramón Núñez Villarroel and Arnaldo Berríos, with whom he had already acted in "Esperando a Godot" and "El Rey Lear".

In 2018 he received a tribute from the Actors Union of Chile to his career.

In 2023 he received a Lifetime Achievement Award at the Puerto Montt International Theater Festival for the play "Historia de amor para un alma viejo".

== Filmography ==
=== Movies ===
- B-Happy (2003) – Radomiro
- Los 33 de Atacama (2011) – Miner García

=== Telenovelas ===
| Year | Title | Role | Network |
|---|---|---|---|
| 1981 | Casagrande | Federico | Canal 13 |
| 2008 | Don Amor | Rodolfo Dreyer | Canal 13 |
| 2011 | El Laberinto de Alicia | Harold Harper | TVN |
| 2013 | Graduados | Clemente Falsetti | Chilevisión |
