= Amar a morir (TV series) =

- Also known as: Amar ou Morrer
- Genre: Telenovela
- Created by: Carlos Espinoza; Guillermo García; Alexis Mardones
- Directed by: César Opazo
- Creative director: Rodrigo Sepúlveda
- Starring: Felipe Braun; Antonia Zegers; Ricardo Fernández; María José Illanes
- Theme music composer: Gonzalo Osorio
- Country of origin: Chile
- Original language: Spanish
- No. of seasons: 1
- No. of episodes: 126

Production
- Executive producer: Mauricio Campos
- Producer: Carolina Provoste
- Production locations: Santiago, Chile
- Editor: Claudio Matus
- Running time: 30 minutes
- Production company: Televisión Nacional de Chile

Original release
- Network: TVN
- Release: March 4 – September 30, 2019

Amar a morir (transl. Love to Die) is a Chilean telenovela produced and broadcast by TVN from March 4 to September 30, 2019. It stars Felipe Braun, Antonia Zegers, Ricardo Fernández and María José Illanes.

== Plot ==
The show focuses on the relationship between Caco, a widowed father of three, and Pachi, who recently left her husband, Rafa. After Caco's wife dies, he focuses on his work to the detriment of his children. When he learns he has a terminal illness and only months to live, he decides to do everything he wanted to before he died. He moves to Cajón del Maipo, and starts up his own restaurant like he always wanted to, and refocuses on his children. On moving, he encounters Pachi, who is the owner of a restaurant there.

== Cast ==
- Felipe Braun as Caco Vidal
- Antonia Zegers as Pachi Palacios
- Ricardo Fernández as Rafael Figueroa
- Francisco Reyes as Nicolás Vidal
- Carolina Arregui as Victoria Quezada
- Bastián Bodenhöfer as Nano Palacios
- Ximena Rivas as Gladys Letelier
- María José Illanes as Toya Palacios
- Emilia Noguera as Susana Vasconcellos
- César Sepúlveda asBernardo Canessa
- Óscar Hernández as Emilio Cintolesi
- Paulina Urrutia as Rita Jaramillo
- Juan Pablo Miranda as Marcos Oblitas
- Daniela Estay as Maite Salvatierra
- Raimundo Alcalde as Álvaro Vidal
- Vivianne Dietz as Rocío Figueroa
- Tomás Robertson as Simón Vidal
- Javiera Gaete as Jacinta Palacios
- Diego Chávez as Matías Figueroa
- Aída Caballero as Milagros Vidal
- Ana María Navarro as Luchita Castro
