= Los Pincheira =

- Genre: Telenovela
- Directed by: Vicente Sabatini
- Starring: Francisco Reyes Morandé; Tamara Acosta; Álvaro Morales; Ricardo Fernández; Paz Bascuñán; Juan Falcón
- Opening theme: "Ojos Incandescentes" by Beto Cuevas
- Country of origin: Chile
- Original language: Spanish
- No. of episodes: 127

Production
- Running time: 60 minutes

Original release
- Network: Televisión Nacional de Chile
- Release: March 9 – September 3, 2004

Related
- Los Plateados

Los Pincheira (The Pincheiras) is a 2004 Chilean historic telenovela developed and broadcast by TVN and directed by Vicente Sabatini. The series was based in the story of the Pincheira brothers.

== Plot ==
The telenovela centers in 1918 (One hundred years after the actual events happened). Delfín and Miguel Molina were accused accomplices of his father, who was unjustly accused. This accusation was made by Mrs. Carmen, Olegario Sotomayor's mother. The father of the Molina was shot after the murder charge . From there, both brothers, in charge of his younger brothers Santiago and Trinidad Molina Molina, had to make to live in anonymity as police sought. Subsequently, the charge included Santiago Molina, so far, the three men were brothers guilty of unlawful killing. In one chapter, are shown Delfín and Miguel young with his father in a state of poor health. On stage, their father asked to care for siblings. This explains the enormous commitment of Miguel for taking care of younger siblings, especially Trinidad.

Once the murder occurred alongside Molina brothers and sister Pancrazio (helpers of the old Molina family) escaped through the woods until you find a cave, which became his home. Looting for food began to be daily, until officially, the band "The Pincheira" began to fight for justice for the death of his father.

== Cast ==
- Francisco Reyes Morandé as Miguel Molina.
- Tamara Acosta as Matilde Del Solar.
- Álvaro Morales as Martín Ortúzar .
- Paz Bascuñán as Trinidad Molina.
- Juan Falcón as Delfín Molina.
- Néstor Cantillana as Santos Molina.
- Ricardo Fernández as Ignacio Sotomayor.
- Claudia di Girolamo as Marwa Abu Kassem.
- Francisco Melo as Chadi Abu Kassem.
- Delfina Guzmán as Josefina Covarrubias.
- Luis Alarcón as Padre Antonio Ortúzar.
- Marés González as Carmen Valdivia.
- Amparo Noguera as Luisa Sotomayor.
- Marcelo Alonso as Domingo Del Solar.
- Antonia Zegers as Asunción Del Solar.
- Alfredo Castro as Floridor Carmona.
- José Soza as Olegario Sotomayor.
- Roxana Campos as Ester Mardones.
- Juan Pablo Ogalde as José Manuel Sotomayor.
- Daniela Lhorente as Rosario Sotomayor.
- Álvaro Espinoza as Jamal Abu Kassem.
- Blanca Lewin as Samira Abu Kassem.
- Pablo Schwarz as Naím Abu Kassem.
- Ximena Rivas as Fátime Hassan.
- Gonzalo Canelo as Yussef Hassan.
- Adela Secall as María Jorquera "La Gata".
- Claudia Cabezas as Ramoncito Barraza / Ramoncita Barraza.
- Carmen Disa Gutiérrez as Margarita Barraza.
- Óscar Hernández as Sofanor Silva.
- María José Necochea as Irma Solís.
- Francisca Gavilán as Rosita Luna.
- Rodrigo Pérez as Pancracio Jorquera.
- Luz Jiménez as Domitila Cruz.
- Eduardo Soto as Salustio Moya.
- Mireya Véliz as Clementina Pérez.
- Karin Vodanovic as Agustina Del Solar.
- Ingrid Isensee as Concepción Fuentealba.
- César Caillet as Francisco Del Canto.
- Carolina Vargas as Bernardita Fuentealba.
