= Felipe Braun =

Chilean actor (born 1970)

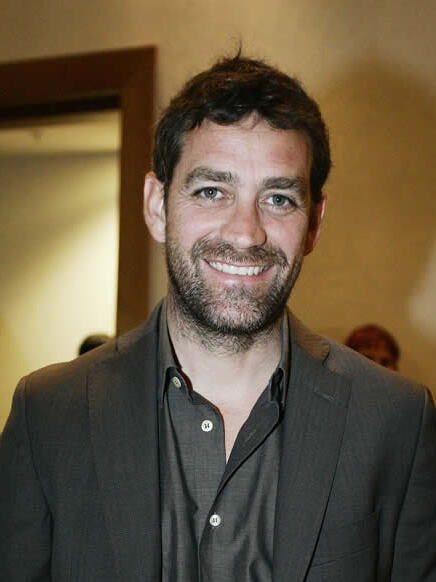
- Braun in 2009
- Born: Felipe Braun Valenzuela; 3 December 1970 (age 55); Mexico City, Mexico
- Occupation: Actor

Felipe Braun Valenzuela (born 3 December 1970) is a Chilean actor.

In theater, he starred with Antonia Zegers In My Way (2003), a play directed by Achondo that tells the story of a kidnapping; he also participated in the 2005 revival of Rojas Magallanes, a piece by the same director. In Charly Tango he played Polo, a blind tourist businessman. Braun is also a director and as such he mounted in 2002 Fragments of a farewell letter read by geologists, by Normand Chaurette (presented at the Museum of Natural History with Mariana Loyola and Luciano Cruz-Coke) and Miss Julia, by August Strindberg (Theater Municipal de Santiago, with Ximena Rivas and Cruz-Coke). As a cultural manager, he founded in 2001 with the latter actor the Lastarria 90 Theater, known as L90, a cultural center where a series of theatrical works have been staged and has supported the development of several films through the digital cinema competition.

In 2011, he returned to the theater as the lead in Martin McDonagh's The Pillowman, directed by Willy Semler, in which he plays the role of Katurian, author of ghoulish tales. In 2013, after 11 years, he returned to National Television to star in the soap opera Solamente Julia. Later, he participated in Volver a amar, La Chúcara, El camionero, La colombiana and finally Amar a morir in 2019, the latest TVN telenovela. Likewise, with Amar a Morir he culminated his career in soap operas and officially withdrew on 14 July 2020, during an interview in which he announced the decision.

== Filmography ==
=== Films ===
- 10.7: El caso de Monserrat de Amesti (1997, cortometraje de Marco Enríquez-Ominami)
- Juan Fariña (1999, de Marcelo Ferrari) como Teniente
- Smog (2000, corto de Sebastián Lelio y Marialy Rivas)
- Monos con navaja (2000, de Stanley Gonczanski) como Mario.
- Azul y blanco (2004, de Sebastián Araya), como Joven Político.
- Se arrienda (2005, de Alberto Fuguet) como Julián Balbo.
- Mi mejor enemigo (2005, de Alex Bowen) como Teniente Riquelme.
- Radio Corazón (2007, de Roberto Artiagoitia) como Cristián Covarrubias.
- Santos (2008, de Nicolás López) como Padre de Arturo.
- Oscuro iluminado (2008, de Miguel Ángel Vidaurre) como Miguel

=== Telenovelas ===
Year	Title	Personnel	Role	Channel
1994	Rompecorazón	Renato Castro	Secundario	Televisión Nacional
1995	Estúpido cupido	Daniel Meza	Secundario	Televisión Nacional
1995	Juegos de fuego	Cristóbal Spencer	Secundario	Televisión Nacional
1996	Sucupira	Cristián López	Secundario	Televisión Nacional
1997	Oro verde	Nicolás Moraga	Secundario	Televisión Nacional
1998	Iorana	Rafael Balbontín	Secundario	Televisión Nacional
1999	La fiera	Tomás Martínez	Secundario	Televisión Nacional
1999	Aquelarre	Gonzalo Guerra	Secundario	Televisión Nacional
2001	Amores de mercado	Rubén Cancino	Secundario	Televisión Nacional
2002-2003	Purasangre	Juan Estay	Secundario	Televisión Nacional
2003	Machos	Ariel Mercader	Co-protagónico	Canal 13
2004-2005	Tentación	Gabriel Ortiz	Antagónico	Canal 13
2005-2006	Gatas y tuercas	Richard Zamorano	Co-protagónico	Canal 13
2006	Charly tango	Leopoldo "Polo" Valdés	Protagónico	Canal 13
2007	Fortunato	Pablo Mancini	Antagónico	Mega
2011	Infiltradas	Horacio Leiva	Antagónico	Chilevisión
2013	Solamente Julia	Emilio Ibáñez	Protagónico	Televisión Nacional
2014	Volver a amar	Franco Andrade	Antagónico	Televisión Nacional
2014-2015	La Chúcara	Vicente Correa	Protagónico	Televisión Nacional
2016-2017	El camionero	Cristóbal Berenguer	Antagónico	Televisión Nacional
2017	La colombiana	Pedro Watson	Protagónico	Televisión Nacional
2019	Amar a morir	Francisco "Caco" Vidal	Protagónico	Televisión Nacional
