= Valió la pena (TV series) =

- Title card
- Genre: Drama; Comedy
- Written by: Patricia González; Nelson Pedrero; Ricardo Ossandón; Felipe Montero; Luisa Hurtado; Rodrigo Fernández
- Directed by: Enrique Bravo
- Starring: Lorena Bosch; Cristián Arriagada; Francisco Pérez-Bannen
- Opening theme: "Valió la Pena" by Marc Anthony
- Country of origin: Chile
- Original language: Spanish
- No. of episodes: 73

Production
- Executive producer: Vania Portilla
- Producer: Patricia Encina
- Production locations: Santiago, Mejillones (Chile)
- Running time: 45-50 minutes

Original release
- Network: Canal 13
- Release: October 19, 2014 – February 19, 2015

Related
- Mamá mechona; Veinteañero a los 40

Valió la Pena (lit: It was worth it), also known as My Little Dilemma, is a Chilean television soap opera, that aired on Canal 13 from October 19, 2014, to February 19, 2015, starring Lorena Bosch, Francisco Pérez-Bannen and Cristián Arriagada.

== Cast ==
=== Main characters ===
- Lorena Bosch as Rosario García.
- Cristián Arriagada as Gastón Rodríguez.
- Francisco Pérez-Bannen as Sergio Valenzuela / Rodrigo Infante.
- María Fernanda Martínez as Ema Valenzuela.
- Josefina Montané as Antonia Riquelme.
- Mónica Godoy as Martina del Río.

=== Supporting characters ===
- Bastián Bodenhöfer as Raimundo Montes.
- Liliana García as Fernanda Vicuña.
- Josefina Velasco as Lidia Fernández.
- Julio Jung as Lorenzo García.
- María José Bello as Verónica García.
- Marcela del Valle as Magdalena Tagle.
- Catalina González as Miss Pamela Riquelme.
- Cristóbal Tapia-Montt as Felipe Montes.
- Claudio Arredondo as Juan Roca (alias Johnny Rock).
- Ingrid Parra as Karem Jara.
- Eduardo Cumar as Arturo Santa Cruz.
- Cristóbal del Real as Juan Pablo Gómez.
- Francisco Dañobeitia as Vicente Rodríguez.
- Emilia Sánchez as Bélen Santa Cruz.
- Benjamín Ruíz as Mateo Gómez.
- Francisco Godoy as Diego Rodríguez.
- Oliver Borner as Cristóbal Jara "Mamito" / Cristóbal Contreras Jara.

=== Guest appearances ===
- Javiera Hernández as Loreto Zúñiga
- Mario Bustos as Mauro Quispe / Carlos Cacéres
- Ándres San Juan as Moncho
- Antonella Ríos as Sonia
- Edgardo Bruna as Raúl García
- Juan Pablo Bastidas as MD Sebastian Díaz
- Francisco González as Capatáz Pedro
- Francisca Opazo as NTPC Show panellist
- Paola Giannini as Daniela
- Sebastian de la Cuesta as Rafael Lawyer
- Agustín Moya as Ismael Rodríguez
- María José Necochea as Francesca
- Gabriel Sepulveda as Renzo
- Francisca Reiss as Regina
- Marcial Edwards as Rosamel
- Maite Neira as Isidora
- Camila Hirane as María de los Ángeles Palma / Yazmín
- Sandra O'Ryan as María José
- Gabriel Martina as Aléx
- Yuyuníz Navas as Yoga Teacher
- Paola Lértora as Judge
- Karla Matta as NTPC Show Reporter
- Ariel Cerda as Charlie Contreras / Bianca del Río
- Patricia Lopéz Ríos as Hotel owner
- Mireya Sotoconil as former employee of family Santa Crúz
- Nicolás Massú as himself
- Nicole "Luli" Moreno as himself
- Sergio Lagos as himself
- Francisco Saavedra as himself

== Reception ==
=== Television ratings ===
Ibope Media Ratings (Chile)
Original broadcast date		Day rank	Viewership
Series premiere	March 15, 2010	—	17.7%
Series finale	September 6, 2010	—	5.7%
Average			4.9%

== International broadcast ==
- Ecuador: Telerama (2016).
