= El Laberinto de Alicia (Chilean TV series) =

- Genre: Serial drama
- Created by: Nona Fernández
- Directed by: Rodrigo Velásquez; Claudio López de Lérida
- Starring: Sigrid Alegría; Francisco Reyes; Marcelo Alonso; Amparo Noguera; Bastián Bodenhöfer; Mauricio Pesutic
- Country of origin: Chile
- Original language: Spanish
- No. of seasons: 1
- No. of episodes: 122

Production
- Executive producer: María Eugenia Rencoret
- Producers: Daniela Demicheli; Cecilia Aguirre
- Production location: Santiago
- Running time: 55–60 minutes

Original release
- Network: TVN
- Release: March 14 – October 5, 2011

Related
- 40 y Tantos; Su nombre es Joaquín; El Laberinto de Alicia (2014) El Laberinto de Alicia (2015)

El Laberinto de Alicia (lit: Alicia's Labyrinth) is a Chilean action television series created by Nona Fernández, that aired on the main channel of Televisión Nacional de Chile from March 14, to October 5, 2011, starring Sigrid Alegría, Francisco Reyes, Marcelo Alonso, Amparo Noguera, Bastián Bodenhöfer, and Mauricio Pesutic.

== Plot ==
Shelter From the beginning the School was a very placid, family-students, parents and teachers lived together harmoniously. After the tragic death of its founder Mr. Harold Harper (Eduardo Barril), his widow Miss Helen Harper (Gloria Münchmeyer) and a board consisting of prominent alumni and parents have been at the forefront of this unique establishment elite. This peaceful world is threatened when in the act of anniversary, one of his students has a strange fainting. Alicia (Sigrid Alegría), the school counselor recognizes the dismay of the little Valentina Andrade (Isidora González) the indication of a particular form of abuse that is very familiar. Years ago, when the network broke largest pederast, the leader of this organization was its master Vladimir Navarenko (Mauricio Pesutic). And the phone he used to abuse the young was giving a small dose of benzodiazepines to numb. The suspicion that a rising criminal mastermind is incubated in the vicinity of Shelter School makes Alicia mad. Dam has already experienced the horror, the school counselor is confident that his intuitions are correct and are to new case of abuse. The thought of raising Alice, quickly generates fear among students and parents, and was immediately condemned by the Andrade family-Donoso until they themselves begin to suspect, after his strange disappearance, that someone is abusing her daughter.

Navarenko reveals to Alice that an admirer is behind Valentina, after his daughter Dominga (Catalina Montenegro) and the other children around them. The first suspect was Gregory Harper (Álvaro Espinoza (actor)|) due to its proximity to Valentina, Harper is the director of Shelter School and adopted son of Miss Helen and the late Mr. Harold. Gregory begins to have dreams of a cellar in which a child is abused, those who make suspicious of himself and of his innocence, then it is revealed that his dreams were actually memories where Mr. Harold abusing him. This basement was in the Shelter School and many children were abused there by Mr. Harper.

New Victims describe the place where the abuse occurred as a basement, this is identical to the Shelter School, Alice and her ex-husband who is case Detective Manuel (Francisco Reyes) conclude that the pedophile is an alumnus of the School to Shelter recreates the place was abused by Mr. Harold Harper, wanting to follow the steps above.

The pedophile has an alter-ego, "Carlitos", the name by which it communicates via Internet chat rooms and phone calls, his technique is to befriend the children, teach them to chat and then delete the conversation history, manipulate them lie to their parents, so children look after their identity. Valentina escapes from a school trip to meet with Charlie, who eventually abused her sexually. Suspicion fell on San Martín Octavio (Andrés Velasco), who received money from Mr. Harper also said he had been in the basement, resulting in a temporary break with his wife Bettina Molinari (Monica Godoy). The detectives find clues pointing to Baltazar Andrade (Bastián Bodenhöfer), father of Valentina and their immediate environment will begin to doubt him, especially his wife Sofia (Amparo Noguera), then becomes the major suspect.

== Cast ==
=== Main characters ===
- Sigrid Alegría as Alicia Molinari.
- Francisco Reyes as Manuel Inostroza.
- Marcelo Alonso as Esteban Donoso.
- Amparo Noguera as Sofía Donoso.
- Bastián Bodenhöfer as Baltazar Andrade.
- Mauricio Pesutic as Vladimir Navarenko.

=== Supporting characters ===
- Mónica Godoy as Bettina Molinari.
- Andrés Velasco as Octavio San Martín.
- Gloria Münchmeyer as Miss Hellen Harper.
- Álvaro Espinoza as Gregorio Harper.
- Adela Secall as Paula Moncada.
- Simón Pesutic as Santiago San Martín.
- Maite Orsini as Dolores Donoso.
- Felipe Álvarez as Maximiliano Andrade.
- Óscar Hernández as Julio Mardones.
- Isidora González as Valentina Andrade.
- Catalina Montenegro as Dominga Inostroza.
- Gaspar Vigneaux as Lorenzo San Martín.
- Josefina Vigneaux as Francesca San Martín.

=== Guest appearances ===
- Eduardo Barril as Mr. Harold Harper.
- Paola Volpato as Rebeca Brethauer.
- Margarita Llanos as Detective Solimano.
- Elvis Fuentes as Detective Marambio.
- Paulette Sève as Carolina Berríos.
- Javiera Toledo as Claudia López.
- Luis Eduardo Campos as Luis Rojas Padilla.

== International broadcast ==
- Ecuador: Telerama.
- Uruguay: Channel 10.

== International versions ==
The Colombian version of the series was launched by RCN on 2014, and the American version by Telemundo on 2015.
