= Solamente Julia =

- Genre: Telenovela
- Directed by: Cristián Maringuer; María Eugenia Rencoret
- Starring: Susana Hidalgo; Felipe Braun; Ignacia Baeza; Santiago Tupper; Andrea Velasco; Patricio Achurra; Cecilia Cucurella
- Opening theme: Volví a Nacer by Carlos Vives
- Country of origin: Chile
- Original language: Spanish
- No. of episodes: 150

Production
- Producer: Álex Bowen
- Production locations: Santiago, Chile
- Cinematography: Camila Villagrán (screenplay)
- Production company: Televisión Nacional de Chile

Original release
- Network: TVN
- Release: March 11 – October 10, 2013

Related
- Dama y obrero; El regreso

Solamente Julia is a Chilean telenovela produced and broadcast by TVN.

== Cast ==
- Susana Hidalgo as Julia Sepúlveda
- Felipe Braun as Emilio Ibáñez
- Ignacia Baeza as Ángela García
- Patricio Achurra as Gerardo García
- Cecilia Cucurella as Beatriz Larraín - Main villain
- Andrea Velasco as Isabel Larraín
- Santiago Tupper as Max Carvajal
- Tatiana Molina as Amelia Rojas - Villain
- Marcelo Valdivieso as Pedro Castillo
- Óscar Hernández as Manuel Muñoz
- Carolina Arredondo as Fernanda Salgado
- Ignacio Achurra as Marco Muñoz
- Jorge Velasco as Camilo Sepúlveda
- Andreína Chataing as Idannia Reyes
- Piero Macchiavello as Simón Ibáñez

== See also ==
- Televisión Nacional de Chile
