= Jorge Marchant Lazcano =

- Born: March 9, 1950 (age 76); Santiago, Chile
- Occupations: Novelist, playwright and journalist

Jorge Marchant Lazcano (born March 9, 1950, in Santiago, Chile) is a Chilean writer, playwright, screenwriter, novelist and journalist.

He is the son of Jorge Marchant Montalva and María Ester Lazcano Cuevas. He had a religious, conservative and very formal education of which Jorge partially united, when he began to study journalism at the Universidad de Chile in 1969.

== Start in the literature ==
His first literary contributions were published by Editorial Quimantú, a former publishing house of Chile. Very soon he discovered a new form of literature that helped him to write La Beatriz Ovalle, his first novel, published in Buenos Aires, Argentina in 1977. That book became later one of the biggest successes of Chilean publications, although the coup d'état of General Augusto Pinochet was a hard misfortune for the culture and literature of this country.

== A writer with strength ==
His first job as a journalist was for Revista Paula, a magazine dedicated to the women's world. Simultaneously he wrote literary reviews for the evening newspaper La Segunda, but his vocation as a journalist did not consolidate and in the 1980s Televisión Nacional de Chile, a TV channel from Santiago, hired him as a screenwriter. In the meantime he published two new titles, La noche que nunca ha gestado el día, a short novel (1982), and Matar a la dama de las camelias, a short fiction book (1986). He also released two new theater plays during those years: Gabriela (1981), about the life of Gabriela Mistral, the first Latin American to win the Nobel Prize in Literature, and Última Edición (1983), an ironic portrait of his journalistic participation in the Revista Paula magazine. Many of his tales were included in Chilean and international anthologies. One of his most important achievements was his inclusion in the book My Deep Dark Pain Is Love, an anthology of gay narrative, published by Gay Sunshine Press in San Francisco, where he appears along with authors such as Manuel Puig, Reinaldo Arenas and Luis Zapata.

== Screenwriter of television series ==
Being a television series writer was not widely admired or highly regarded during those years and Jorge Marchant was strongly criticized for working in this field. In spite of this, his work opened the door for other writers willing to start in the budding industry of television. His most relevant creation during that stage was Volver a empezar (1990). During the 1990s Jorge Marchant wrote many television series that are considered classics in the genre. He also built the foundations for a television playwright of wide repercussions in Chile.

== Successful return to the world of literature ==
In 1999 he released a new drama named No me pidas la luna and in 2002 Marchant published the historical novel Me parece que no somos felices, followed by La joven de blanco (2004). This was followed by Sangre como la mía (2006), for which he received the Altazor National Arts award in Chile. His most recent creation is the novel El amante sin rostro.

Although Jorge Marchant officially lives in Santiago, the capital city of Chile, he spends more or less half of the year in New York, with a complete dedication to the job of writing.

== Works ==
Published books

- La Beatriz Ovalle
- La noche que nunca ha gestado el día
- Matar a la dama de las Camelias
- Me parece que no somos felices
- La joven de blanco
- Sangre como la mía
- El amante sin rostro

Participation in anthologies

- My Deep Dark Pain Is Love

Playwright

- Gabriela
- Última Edición
- No me pidas la luna

Awards

- Premio Altazor de Novela – Versión 2007
