= Gonzalo Justiniano =

Chilean filmmaker (born 1955)

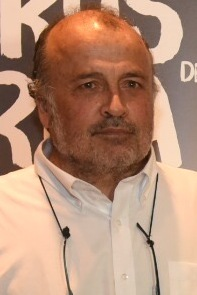
- Gonzalo Justiniano
- Born: Santiago de Chile
- Occupation: Film director

Gonzalo Justiniano (born 1955) is a Chilean filmmaker.

== Select filmography ==
- Guerreros pacifistas - 1984
- La Victoria - 1984
- Children of the Cold War (Hijos de la guerra fría) - 1986
- Sussi - 1988
- Candy or Mint (Caluga o menta) - 1990
- Amnesia - 1994
- Pasión gitana - 1997
- Tuve un sueño contigo - 1999
- El Leyton - 2002
- B-Happy - 2003
- Lokas - 2008
- Have You Seen Lupita? (¿Alguien ha visto a Lupita?) - 2011
- Damn Kids (Cabros de mierda) - 2017
