= History of the Jews in Latin America and the Caribbean =

The history of the Jews in Latin America and the Caribbean began with conversos who joined the Spanish and Portuguese expeditions to the continents. The Alhambra Decree of 1492 led to the mass conversion of Spain's Jews to Catholicism and the expulsion of those who refused to do so. Many conversos, Jews who converted to Christianity under pressure during the Spanish Inquisition, did travel to the New World. While the Spanish Crown required settlers to be of Catholic lineage, conversos often presented themselves as devout Catholics to meet this requirement. Some sought refuge in the Americas to escape persecution of the Inquisition, which followed them even to the Spanish viceregal towns.

In places like Mexico and New Mexico, conversos maintained their faith in secret while outwardly adhering to Catholic practices. Their migration was driven by both the hope for greater economic opportunities and the desire to escape religious oppression. The first Jews came with the first expedition of Christopher Columbus, including Rodrigo de Triana and Luis de Torres.

Throughout the 15th and 16th centuries a number of converso families migrated to the Netherlands, France and eventually Italy, from where they joined other expeditions to the Americas. Others migrated to England or France and accompanied their colonists as traders and merchants. By the late 16th century, fully functioning Jewish communities were founded in the Portuguese colony of Brazil, the Dutch Suriname and Curaçao; Spanish Santo Domingo, and the English colonies of Jamaica and Barbados. In addition, there were unorganized communities of Jews in Spanish and Portuguese territories where the Inquisition was active, including Colombia, Cuba, Puerto Rico, Mexico and Peru. Many in such communities were crypto-Jews, who had generally concealed their identity from the authorities.

By the mid-17th century, the largest Jewish communities in the Western Hemisphere were located in Suriname and Brazil. Several Jewish communities in the Caribbean, Central and South America flourished, particularly in those areas under Dutch and English control, which were more tolerant. More immigrants went to this region as part of the massive emigration of Jews from eastern Europe in the late 19th century. During the Nazi period, Latin America became one of several regions of refuge for German-speaking and other European Jewish refugees, although admission policies varied by country. The Jewish Museum Berlin has described the forced emigration of Ashkenazi Jews after 1933 as extending to more than one hundred countries, including countries in Latin America. The American Jewish Joint Distribution Committee also supported emigration and relief efforts in the region, including the Dominican Republic Settlement Association in Sosúa, refugee assistance in Cuba, and partnerships with local committees in Bolivia, Peru, Ecuador, Brazil and Uruguay. These efforts included agricultural settlements, refugee homes, work programs and community relief. In the 21st century, fewer than 300,000 Jews live in Latin America. They are concentrated in Argentina, Brazil, Chile, Cuba, Mexico and Uruguay.

== Argentina ==
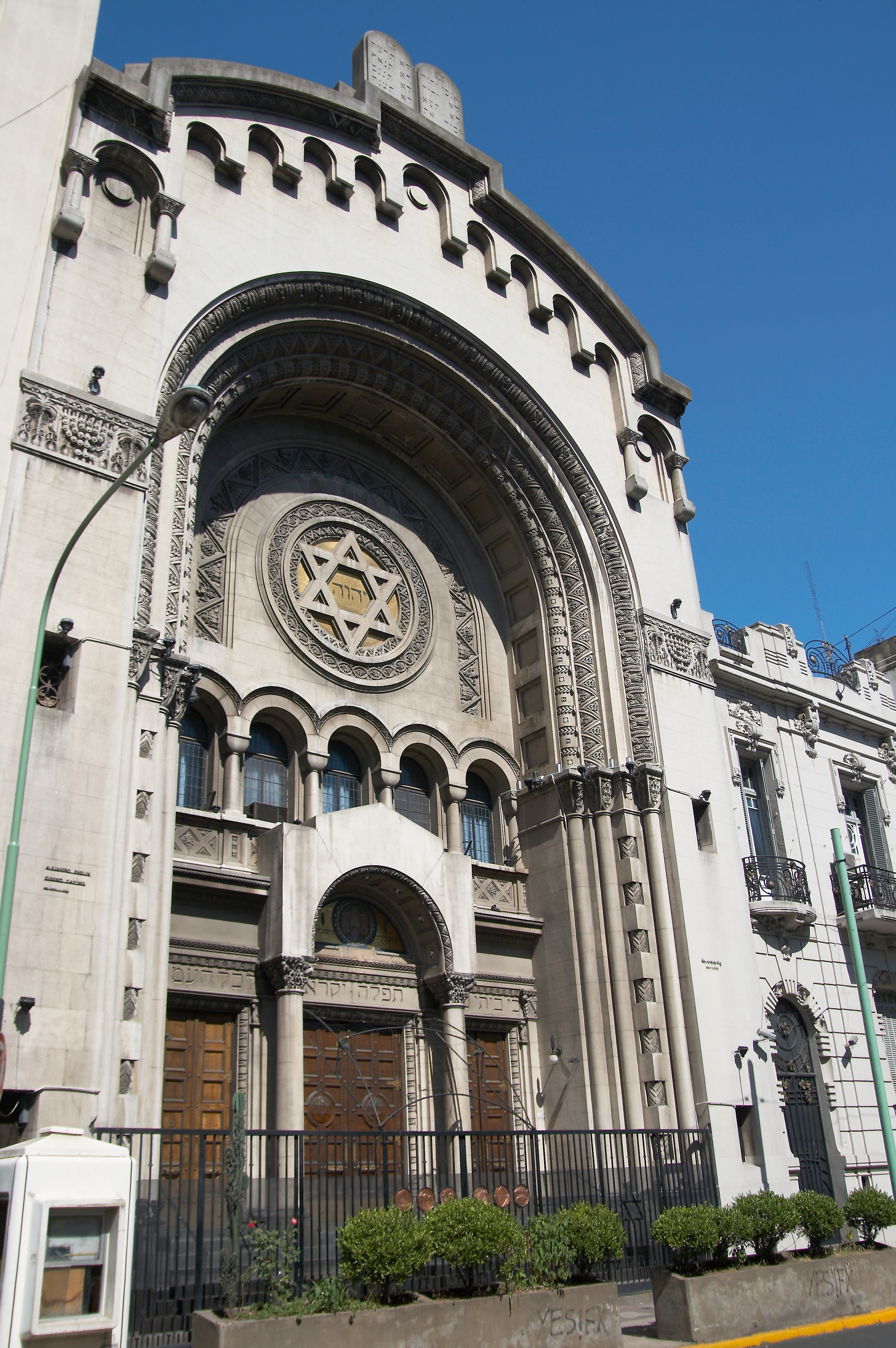
Templo Libertad Synagogue in Buenos Aires.

Jews fleeing the Inquisition settled in Argentina, where they intermarried with native women. Portuguese traders and smugglers in the Virreinato del Río de la Plata were considered by many to be crypto-Jewish, but no community emerged after Argentina achieved independence. After 1810 (and about mid-nineteenth century), more Jews, especially from France, began to settle in Argentina. By the end of the century in Argentina, as in America, many Jewish immigrants were coming from Eastern Europe (mainly Russia and Poland) fleeing Tsarist persecution. Upon arrival they were generally called "Russians" in reference to their region of origin.

Jewish individuals and families emigrated from Europe to Argentina before and after World War II, in an attempt to escape the Holocaust and later postwar antisemitism. Between 250,000 and 300,000 Jews now live in Argentina, the vast majority of whom reside in the cities of Buenos Aires, Rosario, Córdoba, Mendoza, La Plata and San Miguel de Tucumán. Argentina has the third-largest Jewish community in the Americas after the United States and Canada, and the sixth largest in the world. According to recent surveys, more than a million Argentines have at least one grandparent of Jewish ethnicity. The Jewish Argentine community legally receives seven holidays per year, with both days of Rosh Hashanah, Yom Kippur, and the first and last two days of Passover, according to the law 26,089.

== Bahamas ==
200 Jews lived in the Bahamas in 2022.

== Bolivia ==
Jewish presence in Bolivia started at the beginning of the Spanish colonial period. Santa Cruz de la Sierra, was founded in 1557 by Ñuflo de Chávez who was accompanied by a small group of pioneers, including several crypto-Jews from Ascuncion and Buenos Aires. The city became known as a safe haven for Jews during the Inquisition in the region.

The second wave of Conversos came to Santa Cruz de la Sierra after 1570, when the Spanish Inquisition began operating in Lima. Alleged marranos (that is, New Christians whom others rightly or wrongly suspected of crypto-Judaism), settled in Potosi, La Paz and La Plata. After they gained economic success in mining and commerce, they faced suspicion and persecution from the Inquisition and local authorities. Most of these marrano families moved to Santa Cruz de la Sierra, as it was an isolated urban settlement where the Inquisition did not bother the conversos. Most of the converso settlers were men, and many intermarried with indigenous or mestizo women, founding mixed-race or mestizo families. Conversos also settled in adjacent towns of Vallegrande, Postrervalle, Portachuelo, Terevinto, Pucara, Cotoca and others.

Many of Santa Cruz's oldest families are of partial Jewish heritage; Some traces of Jewish culture can still be found in family traditions, as well as local customs. For example, some families have family-heirloom seven-branched candle sticks or the custom of lighting candles on Friday at sunset. The typical local dishes can be all prepared with kosher practices (none mix milk and meat, pork is served, but never mixed with other foods). Scholars disagree on provenance and recency of these practices. After almost five centuries, some of the descendants of these families claim awareness of Jewish origins, but practice Catholicism (in certain cases with some Jewish syncretism).

From independence in 1825 to the end of the 19th century, some Jewish merchants and traders (both Sephardim and Ashkenazim) immigrated to Bolivia. Most took local women as wives, founding families that eventually merged into the mainstream Catholic society. This was often the case in the eastern regions of Santa Cruz, Tarija, Beni and Pando, where these merchants came from Brazil or Argentina.

During the 20th century, substantial Jewish settlement began in Bolivia. In 1905, a group of Russian Jews, followed by Argentines, settled in Bolivia. In 1917, it was estimated that there were 20 to 25 professing Jews in the country. By 1933, when the Nazi era in Germany started, there were 30 Jewish families. The first large Jewish immigration occurred during the 1930s; the population had climbed to an estimated 8,000 at the end of 1942. Part of this wartime immigration was connected to the mining industrialist Mauricio Hochschild, whose company records are preserved in the Archivo Histórico de la Minería Nacional of COMIBOL. The collection, registered in UNESCO’s Memory of the World regional programme in 2016, documents activities related to Jewish immigration from Europe to Bolivia during the Holocaust, including the creation of the Israeli Immigrant Protection Society (SOPRO) and the Bolivian Colonization Society (SOCOBO). Hochschild also acquired agricultural properties in Coroico, Yungas, including Santa Rosa and Polo Polo, where immigrant workers were employed in agricultural activities.

During the 1940s, 2,200 Jews emigrated from Bolivia to other countries. Those who remained established communities in La Paz, Cochabamba, Oruro, Santa Cruz, Sucre, Tarija and Potosí. After World War II, a small number of Polish Jews immigrated to Bolivia.

By 2006, approximately 700 Jews remained in Bolivia. There are synagogues in the cities of Santa Cruz de la Sierra, La Paz, and Cochabamba. Most Bolivian Jews live in Santa Cruz de la Sierra.

== Brazil ==
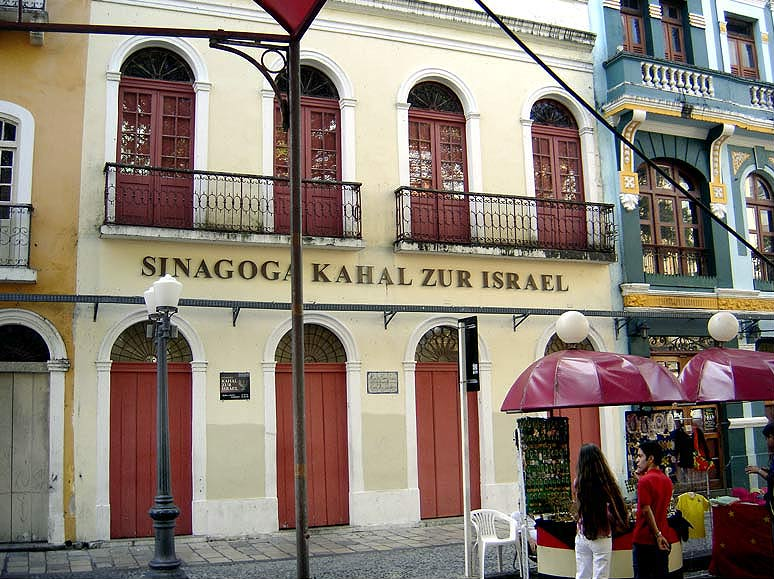
The oldest synagogue in the Americas, Kahal Zur Israel Synagogue, located in Recife.

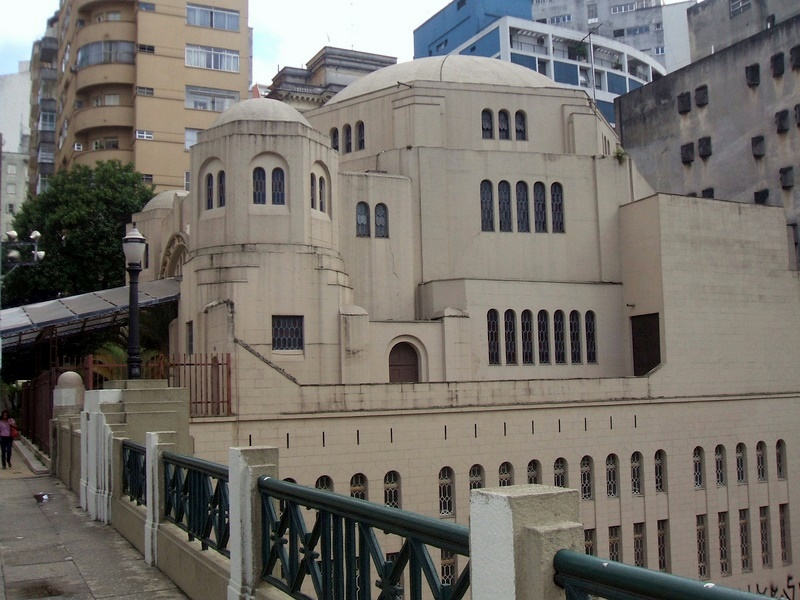
Beth El Synagogue in São Paulo.

Jews settled early in Brazil, especially in areas of Dutch rule. They set up a synagogue in Recife in 1636, which is considered the first synagogue in the Americas. Most of these Jews were conversos who had fled Spain and Portugal to the religious freedom of the Netherlands when the Inquisition began in Portugal in 1536. In 1656, following the Portuguese reconquest of Brazil, Jews left for the Caribbean islands and New Amsterdam under Dutch rule; the latter was taken over by the English in 1664 and was renamed as New York City.

After independence in the 19th century, Brazil attracted more Jews among its immigrants, and pressure in Europe convinced more Jews to leave. Jewish immigration rose throughout the 19th and early 20th centuries, at a time of massive emigration from the Russian Empire (including Poland and Ukraine). Jewish immigration to Brazil was rather low between 1881 and 1900 although this was the height of other international immigration to Brazil; many were going to more industrialized countries. Between 1921 and 1942 worldwide immigration to Brazil fell by 21%, but Jewish immigration to Brazil increased by 57,000. This was in response to anti-immigration legislation and immigration quotas passed by the United States, Argentina, Canada and South Africa, persisting even after the crisis of Jews under the Third Reich became clear. Jewish refugee assistance in Brazil was supported through local committees. The American Jewish Joint Distribution Committee partnered with the Refugee Assistance Committee in Rio de Janeiro, funding services for refugees, including refugee homes such as Lar de União. The Brazilian government generally did not enforce its own immigration legislation. The Jews in Brazil developed strong support structures and economic opportunities, which attracted Eastern European and Polish Jewish immigration. After World War II, Brazil received Jewish Holocaust survivors from Central and Eastern Europe. According to the JDC Archives, more than 18,000 Jewish Holocaust survivors immigrated to Brazil between 1945 and 1959. Some were displaced persons who had first emigrated to Israel, later returned to Europe, and were admitted to Brazil in the early 1950s with the involvement of Jewish relief organizations, including the American Jewish Joint Distribution Committee and HIAS.

Brazil has the 9th largest Jewish community in the world, about 107,329 by 2010, according to the IBGE census. The Jewish Confederation of Brazil (CONIB) estimates that there are more than 120,000 Jews in Brazil. Brazilian Jews play an active role in politics, sports, academia, trade and industry, and are well integrated in all spheres of Brazilian life. The majority of Brazilian Jews live in the state of São Paulo, but there are also sizable communities in Rio de Janeiro, Rio Grande do Sul, Minas Gerais and Paraná.

== Chile ==
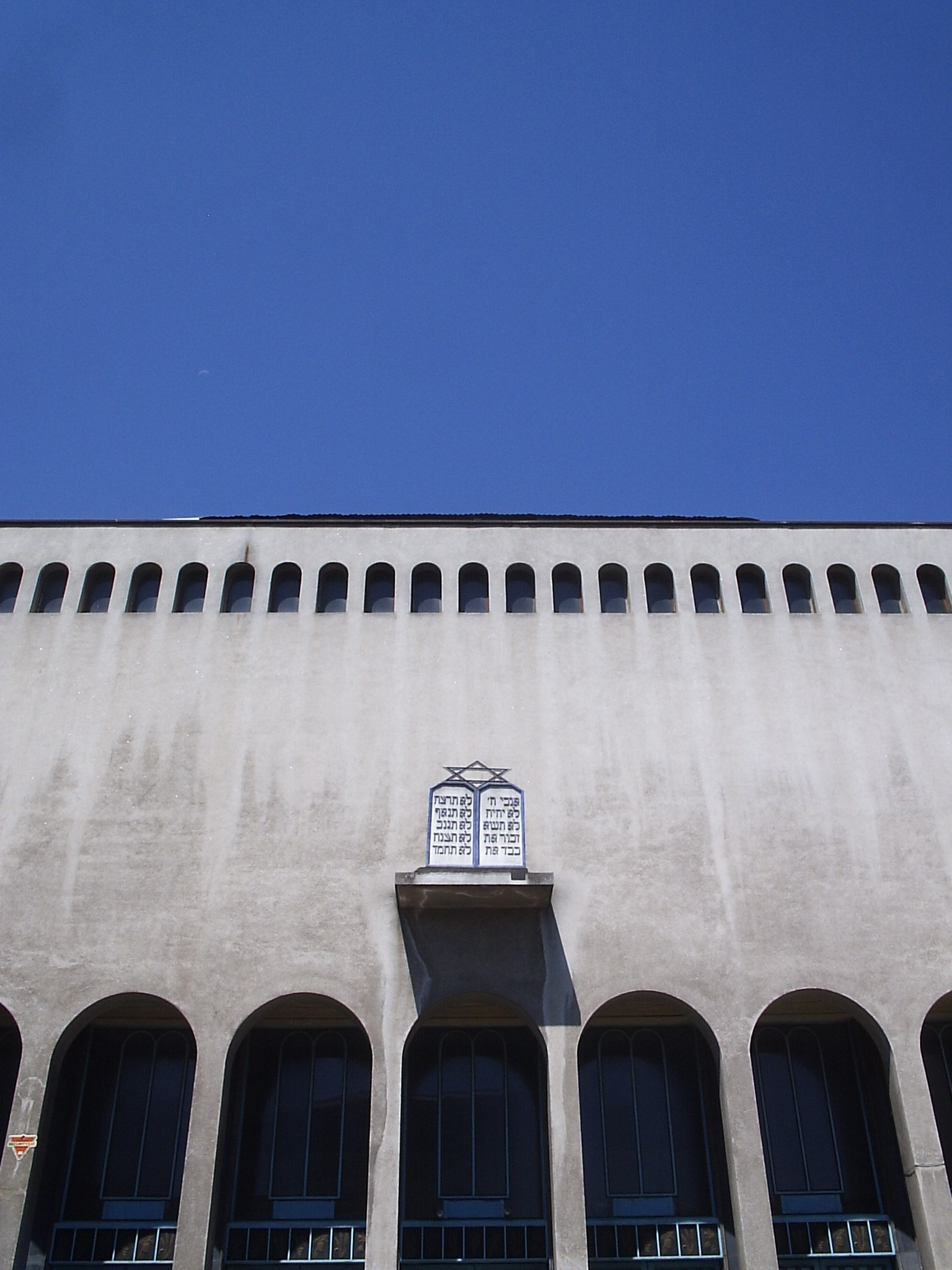
Great Synagogue of Santiago, Chile.

Although a relatively small community amounting to no more than 1% of the country's religious minorities, Jews in Chile have achieved prominent positions in its society. They have had key roles both before and after its independence in 1810. Most Chilean Jews today reside in Santiago and Valparaíso, but there are significant communities in the north and south of the country.

Mario Kreutzberger, otherwise known as "Don Francisco" and host of Sábado Gigante, the longest-running TV show in the world, is a Chilean Jew of German origin. Other Chilean Jews who have achieved recognition in arts and culture include Alejandro Jodorowsky, now established in France and best known internationally for his literary and filmic work. Others include Nissim Sharim (actor), Shlomit Baytelman (actress) and Anita Klesky (actress). Volodia Teitelboim, poet and former leader of the Chilean Communist Party, is one of the many Jews to have held important political positions in the country.

Tomás Hirsch is leader of the radical Green-Communist coalition and former presidential candidate in 2005. State ministers Karen Poniachick (Minister for Mining) and Clarisa Hardy (Minister for Social Affairs) are also Jewish. In the field of sport, tennis player Nicolás Massú (gold medalist in Athens 2004 and former top-ten in the ATP rankings) has Jewish background.

Many of the country's most important companies, particularly in the retail and commercial field, have been set up by Jews. Examples are Calderón, Gendelman, Hites, and Pollak (commercial retailers) and Rosen (Mattress and Bed Industries).

== Colombia ==
"New Christians", fled the Iberian peninsula to escape persecution and seek religious freedom during the 16th and 17th centuries. It is estimated that some reached northern areas of Colombia, which at the time was known as New Granada. Most if not all of these people assimilated into Colombian society. Some continue to practice traces of Sephardic Jewish rituals as family traditions.

In the 18th century, practicing Spanish and Portuguese Jews came from Jamaica and Curaçao, where they had flourished under English and Dutch rule. These Jews started practicing their religion openly in Colombia at the end of the 18th century, although it was not officially legal to do so, given the established Catholic Church. After independence, Judaism was recognized as a legal religion. The government granted the Jews land for a cemetery.

Many Jews who came during the 18th and 19th centuries achieved prominent positions in Colombian society. Some married local women and felt they had to abandon or diminish their Jewish identity. These included author Jorge Isaacs of English Jewish ancestry, the industrialist James Martin Eder (who adopted the more Christian name of Santiago Eder when he translated his name to Spanish) born into the Latvian Jewish community, as well as the De Lima, Salazar, Espinoza, Arias, Ramirez, Perez and Lobo families of Caribbean Sephardim. Coincidentally, these persons and their families settled in the Cauca Valley region of Colombia. They have continued to be influential members of society in cities such as Cali. Over the generations most of their descendants were raised as secular Christians.

During the early part of the 20th century, numerous Sephardic Jewish immigrants came from Greece, Turkey, North Africa and Syria. Shortly after, Jewish immigrants began to arrive from Eastern Europe. A wave of immigrants came after the rise of Nazism in 1933 and the imposition of antisemitic laws and practices, including more than 7,000 German Jews. From 1939 until the end of World War II, immigration was put to a halt by anti-immigrant feelings in the country and restrictions on immigration from Germany.

Colombia asked Germans who were on the U.S. blacklist to leave and allowed Jewish refugees in the country illegally to stay. The Jewish population increased dramatically in the 1950s and 1960s, and institutions such as synagogues, schools and social clubs were established throughout the largest cities in the country.

The changing economy and wave of kidnappings during the last decade of the 20th century led many members of Colombia's Jewish community to emigrate. Most settled in Miami and other parts of the United States. Successes in the nation's Democratic security Policy has encouraged citizens to return; it has drastically reduced violence in the rural areas and criminality rates in urban areas, as well as in spurring the economy. The situation in Colombia has improved to the extent that many Venezuelan Jews are now seeking refuge in Colombia.

In the early 21st century, most of the Jews in Colombia are concentrated in Bogotá, with about 20,000 members, and Barranquilla, with about 7,000 members. Large communities are found in Cali and Medellín, but very few practicing Jews. Smaller communities are found in Cartagena and the island of San Andres. There are 14 official synagogues throughout the country. In Bogotá, Jews each run their own religious and cultural institutions. The Confederación de Asociaciones Judías de Colombia, located in Bogotá, is the central organization that coordinates Jews and Jewish institutions in Colombia.

In the new millennium, after years of study, a group of Colombians with Jewish ancestry formally converted to Judaism to be accepted as Jews according to the halakha.

== Costa Rica ==
The first Jews in Costa Rica were probably conversos, who arrived in the 16th and 17th centuries with Spanish expeditions. In the 19th century Sephardic merchants from Curaçao, Jamaica, Panama and the Caribbean followed. They lived mostly in Central Valley, married local women, and were soon assimilated into the country's general society. Most eventually gave up Judaism altogether.

A third wave of Jewish immigrants came before World War I and especially in the 1930s, as Ashkenazi Jews fled a Europe threatened by Nazi Germany. Most of these immigrants came from the Polish town Żelechów. The term Polacos, which was originally a slur referring to these immigrants, has come to mean door-to-door salesman in colloquial Costa Rican Spanish.

The country's first synagogue, the Orthodox Shaarei Zion, was built in 1933 in the capital San José (it is located along 3rd Avenue and 6th Street). Along with a wave of nationalism, in the 1940s there was some antisemitism in Costa Rica, but generally there have been few problems.

Since the late 20th century there has been a fourth wave of Jewish immigration made up of American and Israeli expatriates who are retiring here or doing business in the country. The Jewish community is estimated to number 2,500 to 3,000 people, most of them living in the capital.

The San José suburb of Rohrmoser has a strong Jewish influence due to its residents. A couple of synagogues are located here, as well as a kosher deli and restaurant. The Plaza Rohrmoser shopping center had the only kosher Burger King in the country. The Centro Israelita Sionista (Zionist Israeli Center) is a large Orthodox compound where a synagogue, library and museum are located. In 2015, the Chaim Weizmann comprehensive school in San Jose had over 300 students in kindergarten, primary, and secondary grades learning in both Spanish and Hebrew.

== Cuba ==
Jews have lived on the island of Cuba for centuries. Some Cubans trace Jewish ancestry to crypto-Jews, called Marranos, who fled the Spanish Inquisition. Early colonists generally married native women and few of their descendants, after centuries of residence, practice Judaism today. There was significant Jewish immigration to Cuba in the first half of the 20th century, as noted in other countries of Latin America. During the Nazi period, Cuba also became a temporary refuge for European Jewish refugees. According to the American Jewish Joint Distribution Committee, most of the 12,000 refugees who arrived in Cuba between 1938 and 1944 received assistance through the local Joint Relief Committee. JDC-supported programs included relief for refugee children and loans that helped skilled refugees establish businesses, including a diamond plant established by Dutch and Belgian Jews in Havana that employed both refugees and local workers. During this time, Beth Shalom Temple in Havana was constructed and became the most prominent Latin American Jewish synagogue. There were 15,000 Jews in Cuba in 1959, but many Jewish businessmen and professionals left Cuba for the United States after the Cuban revolution, fearing class persecution under the Communists.

In the early 1990s, Operation Cigar was launched, and in the period of five years, more than 400 Cuban Jews secretly immigrated to Israel. In February 2007 The New York Times estimated that about 1,500 Jews live in Cuba, most of them (about 1,000) in Havana. Beth Shalom Temple is an active synagogue that serves many Cuban Jews.

== Curaçao ==
Curaçao has the oldest active Jewish congregation in the Americas—dating to 1651—and the oldest synagogue of the Americas, in continuous use since its completion in 1732 on the site of a previous synagogue. The Jewish community of Curaçao also played a key role in supporting early Jewish congregations in the United States in the 18th and 19th centuries, including in New York City and Newport, Rhode Island, where the Touro Synagogue was built. Growth in Latin American Jewish communities, primarily in Colombia and Venezuela, resulted from the influx of Curaçaoan Jews. In 1856 and 1902 the Jews of Coro (Venezuela) were plundered, maltreated, and driven to seek refuge in their native Curaçao.

== Dominican Republic ==
Converso Merchants of Sephardic origin arrived in southern Hispaniola during the 15th, 16th and 17th centuries, fleeing the outcome of the Spanish Inquisition. Over the centuries, many Jews and their descendants assimilated into the general population and some have converted into the Catholic religion, although many of the country's Jews still retain elements of the Sephardic culture of their ancestors. Later, in the 18th and 19th centuries, many Sephardic families from Curaçao emigrated to the Dominican Republic.

Sosúa, near Puerto Plata, became a Jewish refugee settlement founded by Jews fleeing the rising Nazi regime of the 1930s. After the 1938 Évian Conference, General Rafael Trujillo offered to accept these refugees, and the American Jewish Joint Distribution Committee established and funded the Dominican Republic Settlement Association, which supported an agricultural settlement for about 700 refugees in Sosúa. The town retains a synagogue and a museum of Jewish history. Descendants of those Jews can still be found in many other villages and towns on the north of the island.

== Ecuador ==
For some time, prior to the 20th century, many Jews in Ecuador were of Sephardic ancestry and some retained their use of the Judaeo-Spanish (Ladino) language. However, today, most Jewish people in Ecuador are of Ashkenazi ancestry. Some assume that these groups were among the European settlers of Ecuador.

Many Jewish people came from Germany in 1939, on a ship called the "Koenigstein". During the years 1933–43, there were a population of 2,700 Jewish immigrants. In 1939, the Jewish population, mostly German and Polish Jews, were expelled by a decree of the Italian influenced government of Alberto Enriquez Gallo. The antisemitism spread in the population, but was stopped by the intervention of the American embassy. In 1945, there was a reported population of 3,000. About 85% of them were European refugees.

The rise of Jewish immigration to Ecuador was when the Holocaust started. In 1950, there was an estimation of 4,000 persons living in Ecuador. Most of the active Jewish communities in Ecuador are from German origin. The majority of Ecuadorian Jews live in Quito and Guayaquil. There is a Jewish school in Quito. In Guayaquil, there is a Jewish Community under the auspices of Los Caminos de Israel called Nachle Emuna Congregation. Now in 2017 in Ecuador there are only 290 reported Jews in the country.

Among the Jewish immigrants who came to Ecuador were also professionals, intellectuals and artists, some of whom were professors and writers. Other Alberto Capua, Giorgio Ottolenghi, Aldo Mugla, Francisco Breth, Hans Herman, Leopold Levy, Paul Engel, Marco Turkel, Henry Fente, Benno Weiser, Otto Glass, Egon Fellig, and Karl Kohn. Olga Fis valued and spread the Ecuadorian folk art, Constanza Capua conducted archaeological, anthropological and colonial art.

From Sephardic ancestry were Leonidas Gilces and his younger brother Angel Theodore Gilces whom helped many immigrants such as Charles Liebman who reach the capital with his library, which became the most important of the capital. Simon Goldberg who had a library in Berlin, Goethe library of old books that contributed to the dissemination of reading. Vera Kohn was a psychologist and teacher, tasks that at mid-century were not of interest of Ecuadorian women who used to live in their homes given away, devoid of intellectual curiosity and only care about social life. They were not interested in politics, with the exception of Paul Beter, belonging to the second generation of Jews, who became Minister of Economy and Central Bank President.

== El Salvador ==
The first Jews arrived in El Salvador as the first Spanish Settlers since the 16th century, the conversos who practiced Judaism in secret.

Alsatian-born Bernardo Haas, who came to El Salvador in 1868, was believed to be the country's first "recognized" Jewish immigrant. Another Jew, Leon Libes, was documented as the first German Jew in 1888. Sephardic families also arrived from countries such as Turkey, Egypt, Tunisia Spain and France. De Sola helped to found the first synagogue and became an invaluable member of the Jewish community. In 1936, World War II caused the Jewish community to help their ancestors escape from Europe. Some had their relatives in El Salvador. But some were forced to go into countries such as Brazil, Ecuador, Guatemala and Panama. On 30 July 1939, President Martinez barred an entry of fifty Jewish refugees going to El Salvador on the German ship Portland. On 11 September 1948, the community started and continues to support a school "Colegio Estado de Israel". According to the latest Census, there are currently about 100 Jews living in El Salvador, mostly in the capital city of San Salvador. Most of them have Sephardic roots. There is a small town called Armenia in rural El Salvador where people practice Orthodox Sephardic Judaism since the inquisition.

== French Guiana ==
Jews arrived in French Guiana by the way of the Dutch West India Company. Later on 12 September 1659, Jews arrived from Dutch colonies in Brazil. The company appointed David Nassy, a Brazilian refugee, patron of an exclusive Jewish settlement on the western side of the island of Cayenne, an area called Remire or Irmire. From 1658 to 1659, Paulo Jacomo Pinto began negotiating with the Dutch authorities in Amsterdam to allow a group of Jews from Livorno, Italy to settle in the Americas. On 20 July 1600, more than 150 Sephardic Jews left Livorno (Leghorn) and settled in Cayenne. The French agreed to those terms, an exceptional policy that was not common among the French colonies. Nevertheless, nearly two-thirds of the population left for the Dutch colony of Suriname.

Over the decades, the Leghorn Jews of Cayenne immigrated to Suriname. In 1667, the remaining Jewish community was captured by the occupying British forces and moved the population to either Suriname or Barbados to work in sugarcane production. Since the late 17th century, few Jews have lived in French Guiana. In 1992, 20 Jewish families from Suriname and North Africa attempted to re-establish the community in Cayenne. A Chabad organization exists in the country and maintains Jewish life within the community. Today, 800 Jews live in French Guiana, predominately in Cayenne.

== Guatemala ==
The first Jewish migrations to Guatemala date back to the Spanish period. Historical records from the Mexican Inquisition reveal that the earliest Jewish settlers were Crypto-Jews and converts. And there is still descendants of them. ( mainly converted ) As in other spanish america countries.

The modern Jewish community in Guatemala, however, traces its roots to German Jewish immigrants who arrived in the mid-19th century.

The Jews in Guatemala are mainly descendants from immigrants from Germany, Eastern Europe and the Middle East that arrived in the second half of the 19th century and first half of the 20th.

The first Jewish families arrived from the town of Kempen, Posen, Prussia (today Kepno, Poland), establishing themselves in Guatemala City and Quetzaltenango. Immigrants from the Middle East (mainly Turkey) immigrated during the first three decades of the 20th century. Many immigrated during World War II. There are approximately 900 Jews living in Guatemala today. Most live in Guatemala City. Today, the Jewish community in Guatemala is made up of Orthodox Jews, Sephardi, Eastern European and German Jews.

In 2014, numerous members of the communities Lev Tahor and Toiras Jesed, who practice a particularly austere form of Orthodox Judaism, began settling in the village of San Juan La Laguna. Mainstream Jewish communities felt concerned about the reputation following this group, who had left both the US and Canada under allegations of child abuse, underage marriage and child neglect. Despite the tropical heat, the members of the community continued to wear the long black cloaks for men and full black chador for women.

== Haiti ==
When Christopher Columbus arrived in Santo Domingo, as he named it, among his crew was an interpreter, Luis de Torres, who was Jewish. Luis was one of the first Jews to settle on Santo Domingo in 1492. When the western part of the island was taken over by France in 1633, many Dutch Sephardic Jews came from Curaçao, arriving in 1634, after the Portuguese had taken over there. Others immigrated from English colonies such as Jamaica, contributing to the merchant trade. In 1683, Louis XIV banned all religions except Catholicism in the French colonies, and ordered the expulsion of Jews, but this was lightly enforced. Sephardic Jews remained in Saint-Domingue as leading officials in French trading companies. After the French Revolution instituted religious freedom in 1791, additional Jewish merchants returned to Saint-Domingue and settled in several cities. Some likely married free women of color, establishing families. In the 21st century, archaeologists discovered a synagogue of Crypto-Jews in Jérémie in the southwest area of the island. In Cap-Haïtien, Cayes and Jacmel, a few Jewish tombstones have been uncovered.

In the late eighteenth century at the time of the French Revolution, the free people of color pressed for more rights in Saint-Domingue, and a slave revolt led by Toussaint L'Ouverture broke out in 1791 in the North of the island. Slaves considered Jews to be among the white oppressor group. Through the years of warfare, many people of the Jewish community were among the whites killed; some Jews were expelled when the slaves and free blacks took power and instituted restrictions on foreign businessmen. Haiti achieved independence in 1804 but was not recognized by other nations for some time and struggled economically, based on a peasant culture producing coffee as a commodity crop. Foreigners were prohibited from owning land and subject to other restrictions. Planters and other whites were killed in 1805, and Jews were among the whites and people of color who fled to the United States, many settling in New Orleans or Charleston.

Race, as defined in slavery years, and nationality became more important in Haiti in the 19th century than religion, and Jews were considered whites and nationals of their groups. Later in the century, Polish Jews immigrated to Haiti due to the civil strife in Poland and settled in Cazale, in the North-West region of the country. Most Jews settled in port cities, where they worked as traders and merchants. In 1881 a crowd in Port-au-Prince attacked a group of Jews but was drawn back by militia men.

By the end of the 19th century, a small number of Mizrahi Jewish families immigrated to Haiti from Lebanon, Syria and Egypt; there were a higher number of Levantine Christian traders arriving at the same time. German Jews arrived with other German businessmen; they were highly acculturated and were considered part of the German community. In 1915, there were 200 Jews in Haiti. During the 20 years of American occupation, many of the Jews emigrated to the United States. The US and Haiti had joint interests in reducing the number and influence of foreign businessmen. In 1937, the government issued passports and visas to Jews of Germany and Eastern Europe, to help them escape the Nazi persecution. They retained control of any naturalization of foreigners, restricting it. During this time, 300 Jews lived on the island. Most of the Jews stayed until the late 1950s, when they moved on to the United States or Israel.

As of 2010, the number of known Jews in Haiti is estimated at 25, residing in the relatively affluent suburb of Pétion-Ville, outside Port-au-Prince.

Haiti and Israel maintain full diplomatic relations, but Israel's nearest permanent diplomat to the region is based in neighboring Dominican Republic.

== Honduras ==
During the 20th century-1980s, Jewish immigrants came to Honduras, mainly from Russia, Poland, Germany, Hungary and Romania. There were also immigration from Greece, who are of Sephardic origin and Turkey and North Africa, who are of Mizrachi origin. Throughout the 1970s and 1980s, it has been absorbed a huge number of Jewish immigrants from Israel. Through the past two decades, the Honduras experienced a resurgence of Jewish life. Communities in Tegucigalpa and San Pedro Sula grew more active. In 1998, Hurricane Mitch destroyed the synagogue, which was part of the Jewish community center in the Honduras. But the Jewish community contributed money to re-build the temple. Most Honduran Jews live in Tegucigalpa.

== Jamaica ==
The history of the Jews in Jamaica predominantly dates back to the 1490s when many Jews from Portugal and Spain fled the persecution of the Holy Inquisition. When the English captured the colony of Jamaica from Spain in 1655, Jews who were living as conversos began to practice Judaism openly. In 1719, the synagogue Kahal Kadosh Neve Tsedek in Port Royal was built. By the year 1720, 18 percent of the population the capital Kingston was Jewish. For the most part, Jews practiced Orthodox rituals and customs.

A recent study has now estimated that nearly 424,000 Jamaicans are descendants of Jewish (Sephardic) immigrants to Jamaica from Portugal and Spain from 1494 to the present, either by birth or ancestry. Jewish documents, gravestones written in Hebrew and recent DNA testing have proven this. While many are non-practicing, it is recorded that over 20,000 Jamaicans religiously identify as Jews.

Common Jewish surnames in Jamaica are Abrahams, Alexander, Isaacs, Levy, Marish, Lindo, Lyon, Sangster, Myers, Da Silva, De Souza, De Cohen, De Leon, DeMercado, Barrett, Babb, Magnus, Codner, Pimentel, DeCosta, Henriques and Rodriques.

In 2006 Jamaican Jewish Heritage Center opened to celebrate of 350 years of Jews living in Jamaica.

== Mexico ==
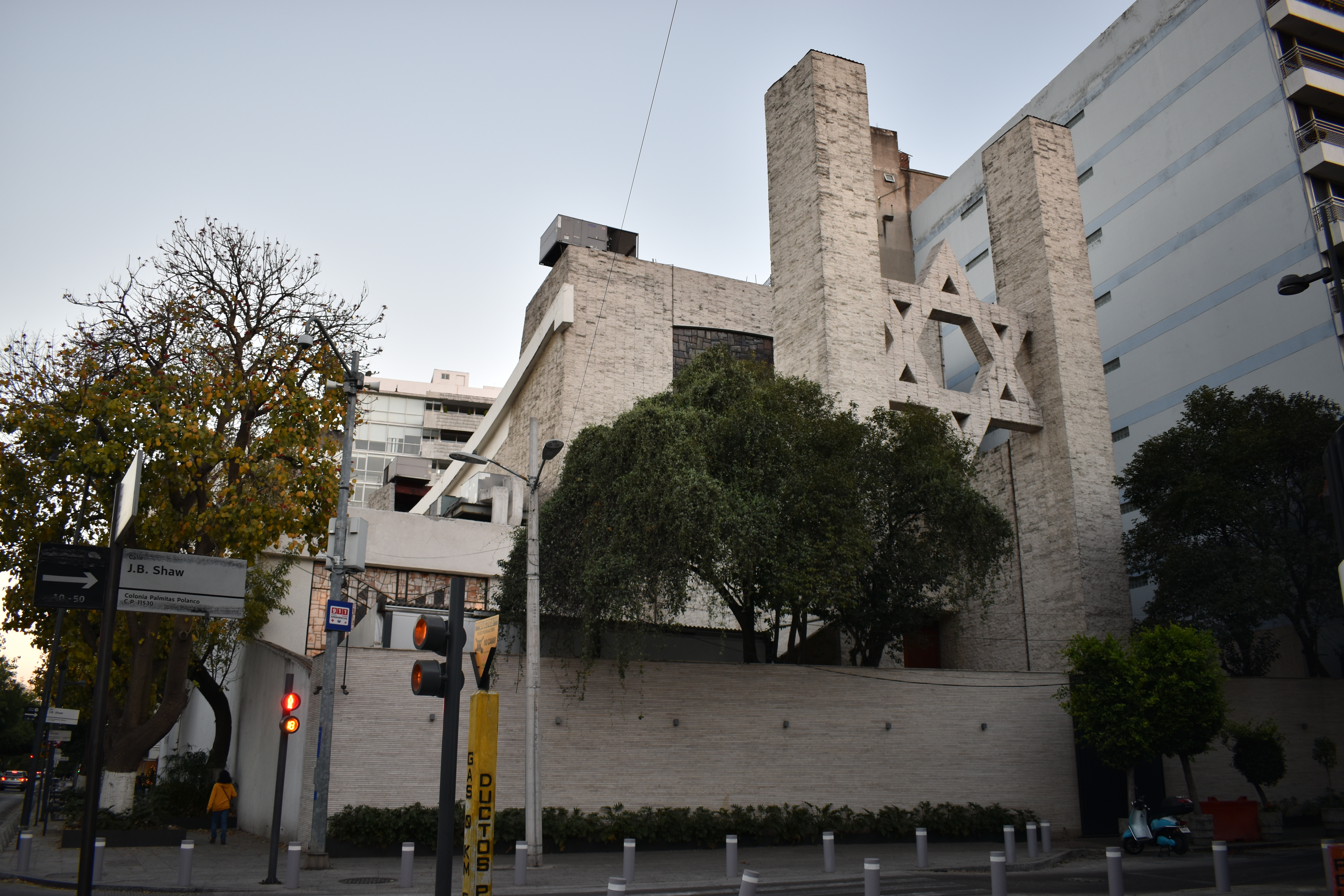
Sinagoga Maguén David in Polanco

New Christians arrived in Mexico as early as 1521. Due to the strong Catholic Church presence in Mexico, few conversos and even fewer Jews migrated there after the Spanish Conquest of Mexico.

Then, in the late 19th century, a number of German Jews settled in Mexico as a result of invitations from Maximilian I of Mexico, followed by a huge wave of Ashkenazic Jews fleeing pogroms in Russia and Eastern Europe. A second large wave of immigration occurred as the Ottoman Empire collapsed, leading many Sephardic Jews from Turkey, Morocco, and parts of France to flee. Finally, a wave of immigrants fled the increasing Nazi persecutions in Europe during World War II. According to the 2010 Census, there are 67,476 Jews in Mexico, making them the third largest Jewish community in Latin America.

Based in Cancún, they reached out to the whole Quintana Roo and Mexican Caribbean including Playa del Carmen, Cozumel, Isla Mujeres and Mérida.

In 2010 they opened a Chabad branch in Playa del Carmen to expand their activities. Rabbi Mendel Goldberg along with his wife Chaya and two daughters where assigned to direct the activities there and open a new center.

The State of Baja California has also had a Jewish presence for the last few hundred years. La Paz, Mexico was home to many Jewish traders who would dock at the port and do business. Many locals in La Paz descend from the prominent Schcolnik, Tuschman and Habiff families, although most are assimilated into Mexican life. In recent years, the tourist industry has picked up in Baja California Sur, which saw many American retirees purchase and live in properties around the Baja. In 2009, with a grassroots Jewish Community formulating and with the help of Tijuana-based businessman José Galicot, Chabad sent out Rabbi Benny Hershcovich and his family to run the operations of the Cabo Jewish Center, located in Los Cabos, Mexico, but providing Jewish services and assistance to Jews scattered throughout the Baja Sur region, including La Paz, Todos Santos and the East Cape.

== Nicaragua ==
In the 20th century, Nicaragua's Jewish community consisted mostly of immigrants from Eastern Europe who arrived in Nicaragua after 1929. The Jews in Nicaragua were a relatively small community, with most living in Managua. The Jews made significant contributions to Nicaragua's economic development while dedicating themselves to farming, manufacturing and retail sales.

It was approximated that the highest number of Jews in Nicaragua reached a peak of 250 in 1972. Some 60 Jews left the country after the 1972 earthquake that devastated Managua, it having destroyed many Jewish businesses, while others fled during the violence and unrest of the 1978-1979 Sandinista Revolution. When Nicaraguan dictator Anastasio Somoza was deposed in 1979, almost all of the remaining Nicaraguan Jews left the country, concerned about their future under the incoming socialist government.

Beginning in 1983, the Reagan administration in the U.S. made a concerted effort to increase domestic support for funding the Contras by persuading American Jews that the Sandinista government was antisemitic. According to Contra leader Edgar Chamorro, CIA officers told him of this plan in a 1983 meeting, justifying it with the antisemitic argument that Jews controlled the media and winning them over would be key to a public relations success. The Anti-Defamation League supported the Reagan administration's charges of Sandinista antisemitism, having actively worked with Nicaraguan Jews to reclaim a synagogue that had been firebombed by Sandinista militants in 1978 and seized by the Sandinista government in 1979. However, a variety of left-wing organizations that opposed the Reagan administration's policies in Latin America, including the progressive New Jewish Agenda, the leftist NGO the Council on Hemispheric Affairs, as well as the American Jewish Committee, all found that there was no evidence to support the U.S. charge of government antisemitism. Anthony Quainton, U.S. ambassador to Nicaragua, also reported no evidence of government antisemitism after an investigation by embassy staff. The dozens of Nicaraguan Jews who had fled the country supported the Reagan administration's charges of antisemitism, citing several instances of intimidation, harassment, and arbitrary arrest, but two of the Jews who remained in Nicaragua denied their accuracy, and they were widely cited in the media at the time.

After Daniel Ortega lost the 1990 presidential election, Nicaraguan Jews started returning to Nicaragua. Prior to 1979 the Jewish community had no rabbi or mohel (circumcision practitioner). In 2005, the Jewish community numbered about 50 people and included 3 mohalim, but had no ordained rabbi. In 2017, there was a mass conversion of 114 Nicaraguans to Judaism.

== Panama ==
=== Viceroyalty Period ===
The presence of Anusim or Crypto-Jews was recorded as early as the first migrations of Spaniards and Portuguese to the territory. Researcher and writer Elyjah Byrzdett explains that the Judeo-Converso phenomenon in Panama can be divided into two main periods: the Castilian period and the Portuguese period.

==== 1. The Castilian Period (1501–1580) ====
This period was marked by the arrival of Crypto-Jews of Castilian origin, who played an active role in the colonization of the territory. When Rodrigo de Bastidas arrived on the Isthmus of Panama in 1501, he was accompanied by recent converts to Christianity. From the first Spanish expeditions and throughout the conquest, Judeo-Conversos were present in the region.

The governor and founder of the city of Panama, Pedro Arias Dávila (known as Pedrarias), had Jewish ancestry on both his paternal and maternal sides. His paternal grandfather, Ysaque Abenazar, was an influential member of the Jewish community of Segovia, who later converted to Catholicism and adopted the name Diego Arias Dávila. Although his religious beliefs remain uncertain, it is established that he protected Judeo-Conversos from persecution led by Franciscan friar Juan de Quevedo.

Other notable figures of Converso origin include the following captains and governors:

- Felipe Gutiérrez de Toledo (a member of the Pisa clan): He served as governor of Veragua and led a migratory movement from Almagro and Toledo to the Veragua region. History professor Enrique Soria Mesa studied this migration and compiled a list of Judeo-Converso individuals who traveled with him.
- Diego Gutiérrez: He was governor of Veragua and obtained, through a new asiento on November 29, 1540, the right to explore and populate the region as governor and captain of Veragua. Tragically, he was killed by the indigenous population.

In his work The Pisa Family: A Converso Lineage, Byrzdett documents the detailed genealogy of the Pisa family, whose descendants arrived in Panama before settling in other regions. Although not all Crypto-Jews bore the name "de Pisa," the author uses it as a reference due to its significance as a common lineage among several Converso families in the region.

==== 2. The Portuguese Period (1580–1640) ====
The Portuguese period began in 1580, following the dynastic union of Portugal with the Spanish Crown. During this period, Portuguese Crypto-Jews, who were better organized and had more resources, managed to establish a house of prayer on Calafates Street, located behind the old cathedral of Panama la Vieja. However, the Inquisition intensified its persecution against Judaizers, culminating in 1640 with an event known as the "Great Conspiracy," which dismantled much of the Crypto-Jewish network on the Isthmus. From then on, their presence in historical records became more difficult to trace, as fear of persecution led many to further conceal their identity.

One of the most documented episodes of this persecution was the arrest of the Portuguese Sebastián Rodríguez, accused of being a Judaizer, meaning a practitioner of Judaism. Rodríguez led a group of Crypto-Jews, including Antonio de Ávila, González de Silva, Domingo de Almeyda, and a Mercedarian friar, all secretly practicing Judaism. During the trial, four doctors confirmed the presence of a circumcision mark on Rodríguez, which was used as evidence against him.

=== Period of Union with Colombia ===
When the isthmus joined Simón Bolívar’s federation project, a new wave of Jewish migration took place, revitalizing Mosaic faith in the region. These early Jewish immigrants arrived under a new policy that encouraged religious freedom in the newly independent territories. Thanks to their proficiency in languages such as German, Spanish, French, English, Dutch, and Papiamento, they played a crucial role as intermediaries and translators, facilitating communication between the local population and foreigners arriving in or passing through the region.

Sephardic (Judeo-Spanish) mainly from nearby islands such as Curaçao, St. Thomas and Jamaica, and Jewish immigrants from Central and Eastern Europe began arriving in Panama in large quantities until the mid-nineteenth century, attracted by economic incentives such as bi-oceanic railway construction and the California gold rush. And Ashkenazi (Judeo-German) Jews began arriving in significant numbers in Panama in the mid-19th century, attracted by economic opportunities such as the construction of the interoceanic railroad and the California Gold Rush. This migratory flow marked an important chapter in the history of Panama’s Jewish community.

=== Republican Period ===
The Republic of Panama, in its current form, would be significantly different without the notable contributions of the Panamanian Jewish community. Its role in the struggle for the country's independence in 1903 was crucial and prevented the failure of the separatist movement. Prominent members of the Kol Shearith Israel Congregation, such as Isaac Brandon, M.D. Cardoze, M.A. De León, Joshua Lindo, Morris Lindo, Joshua Piza, and Isaac L. Toledano, provided essential financial support to the Revolutionary Junta when the promised funds from Philippe Jean Bunau-Varilla failed to materialize. Without their contribution, the lives of the leaders responsible for Panama’s separation from Colombia could have been in jeopardy. For this reason, the commitment of the Jewish community was of vital importance at this historical moment for Panama.

They were followed by other waves of immigration: during the First World War the Ottoman Empire from disintegrating, before and after the Second World War from Europe, from Arab countries because of the exodus caused in 1948 and more recently from South American countries suffering economic crises.

The center of Jewish life in Panama is Panama City, although historically small groups of Jews settled in other cities, like Colón, David, Chitre, La Chorrera, Santiago de Veraguas and Bocas del Toro. Those communities are disappearing as families move to the capital in search of education for their children and for economic reasons. Today Jewish community numbers some 20,000.

Panama is the only country in the world except for Israel that has had two Jewish presidents in the twentieth century. In the sixties Max Delvalle was first vice president, then president. His nephew, Eric Arturo Delvalle, was president between 1985 and 1988. The two were members of Kol Shearith Israel synagogue and were involved in Jewish life.

== Paraguay ==
Toward the 19th century, Jewish immigrants arrived in Paraguay from countries such as France, Switzerland and Italy. During World War I Jews from Palestine (Jerusalem), Egypt and Turkey arrived in Paraguay, mostly Sephardic Jews. In the 1920s, there was a second wave of immigrants from Ukraine and Poland. Between 1933 and 1939, between 15,000 and 20,000 Jews from Germany, Austria and Czechoslovakia took advantage of Paraguay's liberal immigration laws to escape from Nazi-occupied Europe. After World War II, most Jews that arrived in Paraguay were survivors of concentration camps. Today, there are 1,000 Jews mostly living in Paraguay's capital, Asunción. Most are of German descent.

== Peru ==
In Peru, conversos arrived at the time of the Spanish Conquest. At first, they had lived without restrictions because the Inquisition was not active in Peru at the beginning of the Viceroyalty. Then, with the advent of the Inquisition, New Christians began to be persecuted, and, in some cases, executed. In this period, these people were sometimes called "marranos", converts ("conversos"), and "cristianos nuevos" (New Christians) even if they had not been among the original converts from Judaism and had been reared as Catholics. The descendants of these Colonial Sephardic Jewish descent converts to Christianity settled mainly in the northern highlands and northern high jungle, and they were assimilated to local people: Cajamarca, the northern highlands of Piura as Ayabaca and Huancabamba, among others, due to cultural and ethnic contact with the southern highlands of Ecuador.

In modern times, before and after the Second World War, some Ashkenazic Jews, Western and Eastern Slavic and Hungarians mainly, migrated to Peru, mostly to Lima. Today, Peruvian Jews represent an important part of the economics and politics of Peru; the majority of them are from the Ashkenazi community.

== Puerto Rico ==
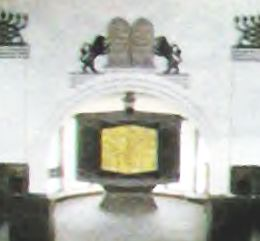
Inside Sha'are Zedeck in Puerto Rico

Puerto Rico is currently home to the largest Jewish community in the Caribbean, with over 3,000 Jews supporting four synagogues; three in the capital city of San Juan: one each Reform, Conservative and Chabad, as well as a Satmar community in the western part of the island in the town of Mayagüez known as Toiras Jesed for Minyanim information. Many Jews managed to settle in the island as secret Jews and settled in the island's remote mountainous interior as did the early Jews in all Spanish and Portuguese colonies. In the late 1800s during the Spanish–American War many Jewish American servicemen gathered together with local Puerto Rican Jews at the Old Telegraph building in Ponce to hold religious services. Many Central and Eastern European Jews came after World War II.

== Suriname ==
Suriname has the oldest Jewish community in the Americas. During the Inquisition in Portugal and Spain around 1500, many Jews fled to the Netherlands and the Dutch colonies to escape social discrimination and inquisitorial persecution, sometimes including torture and condemnation to the stake. Those who were converted to the Catholic faith were called New Christians, conversos, and, less often, "Marranos". The stadtholder of the King of Portugal gave those who wanted to depart some time to let them settle, and supplied them with 16 ships and safe conduct to leave for the Netherlands. The Dutch government gave an opportunity to settle in Brazil. But most found their home in Recife, and merchants became cocoa growers. But the Portuguese in Brazil forced many Jews to move into the northern Dutch colonies in the Americas, The Guyanas. Jews settled in Suriname in 1639.

Suriname was one of the most important centers of the Jewish population in the Western Hemisphere, and Jews there were planters and slaveholders.

For a few years, when World War II arrived, many Jewish refugees from the Netherlands and other parts of Europe fled to Suriname. Today, 2,765 Jews live in Suriname.

== Trinidad and Tobago ==
Trinidad and Tobago, a former British colony, is home to over 500 Jews.

== Uruguay ==
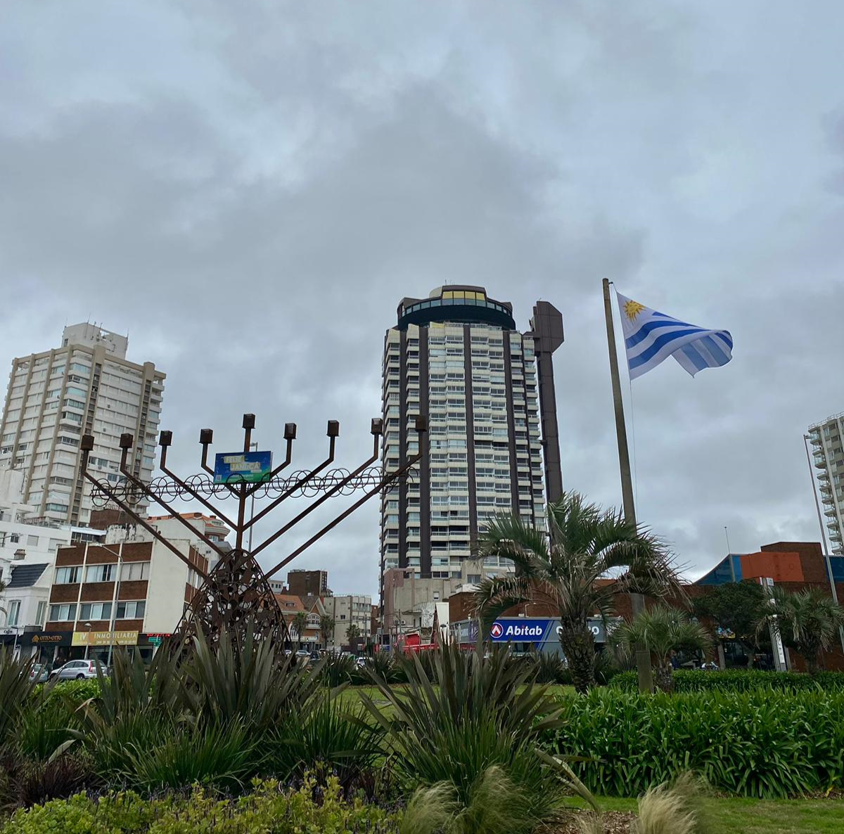
Public menorah in Punta del Este.

Uruguay is home to the fifth-largest Jewish community in Latin America, but the largest as a proportion of the country's total population. Jewish presence began during the colonial era, with the arrival of conversos to the Banda Oriental, fleeing the Spanish Inquisition. However, considerable Jewish immigration began at the end of the 19th century with the arrival of some Sephardic Jews from neighboring countries, and spread during the first half of the 20th century with the arrival of a large number of Ashkenazim from Central and Eastern Europe.

By the first decades of the 20th century, the Jewish community had already set up an educational network, and its presence was notable in several areas of the capital Montevideo, such as the Villa Muñoz neighborhood, which became known as the city's Jewish quarter. In addition, Jews from Belarus and Bessarabia formed an agricultural community in the rural area of the Paysandú Department.

Most of the Jewish immigration to Uruguay took place in the 1920s and 1930s, although in this latter period, there were some Fascist and liberal anti-immigration sectors that opposed all foreign immigration, weighing heavily on Jewish immigration. However, the country has traditionally been the destination of a large number of Jewish refugees during and after World War II. In 1940, the Central Israelite Committee of Uruguay was founded, uniting the different Jewish communities that had been formed based on the place of origin of the Jews who arrived in the country. It is estimated that between the 1950s and 1960s the Jewish community in Uruguay was made up of approximately 50,000 people.

== Venezuela ==
The history of Venezuelan New Christians most likely began in the middle of the 17th century, when some records suggest that groups of conversos lived in Caracas and Maracaibo. At the turn of the 19th century, Venezuela and Colombia were fighting against their Spanish colonizers in wars of independence. Simón Bolívar, Venezuela's liberator and his sister, found refuge and material support for his army in the homes of Jews from Curaçao. After independence, in 1826 practicing Jews came from Curaçao to Santa Ana Coro, where they had flourished under Dutch rule. Judaism was recognized as a legal religion. The government granted the Jews land for a cemetery.

According to a national census taken at the end of the 19th century, 247 Jews lived in Venezuela as citizens in 1891. In 1907, the Israelite Beneficial Society, which became the Israelite Society of Venezuela in 1919, was created as an organization to bring all the Jews who were scattered through various cities and towns throughout the country together.

By 1943, nearly 600 German Jews had entered the country, with several hundred more becoming citizens after World War II. By 1950, the community had grown to around 6,000 people, even in the face of immigration restrictions.

During the first decades of the 21st century, many Venezuelan Jews decided to emigrate due to the growth of antisemitism and to the political crisis and instability. Currently, there are around 10,000 Jews living in Venezuela, with more than half living in the capital Caracas. Venezuelan Jewry is split equally between Sephardim and Ashkenazim. All but one of the country's 15 synagogues are Orthodox. The majority of Venezuela's Jews are members of the middle class.

The current president of Venezuela, Nicolas Maduro, claims to be of Sephardic Jewish descent. Jewish groups, such as the Latin American Jewish Congress, have criticized Maduro and his predecessor, Hugo Chavez, of fostering antisemitism.

== Reported Jewish populations in the Americas and the Caribbean in 2014 ==
Rank (Worldwide)	Country	Jewish Population	% of Country
7	Argentina	180,500	0.42%
10	Brazil	93,800	0.05%
14	Mexico	40,000	0.03%
24	Uruguay	16,900	0.36%
24	Chile	18,300	0.1%
26	Panama	10,000	0.28%
31	Venezuela	7,600	0.02%
39	Colombia	7,500	<0.01%
47	Costa Rica	4,800	0.80%
51	Peru	1,900	<0.01%
54	Puerto Rico	1,500	<0.04%
60	Paraguay	900	<0.01%
61	Guatemala	900	0.02%
63	Ecuador	600	<0.01%
67	Cayman Islands	600	1.00%
68	Cuba	500	0.00%
69	United States Virgin Islands	500	0.48%
74	Bahamas	300	0.09%
80	Jamaica	300	0.09%
81	Netherlands Antilles	200	0.07%
82	Suriname	200	0.03%
88	Dominican Republic	100	0.003%
89	El Salvador	100	<0.01%
90	Honduras	100	0.00%
107	Aruba	85	0.08%
N/A	French Guiana	880?	0.02%
N/A	Barbados	970?	0.00%
N/A	Haiti	25?	0.00%
N/A	Bermuda	20?	0.00%

^{1} CIA World Factbook, with most estimates current as of July 2014; Jewish Virtual Library: Vital Statistics: Jewish Population of the World (1882 – Present).

== See also ==
- List of Caribbean Jews
- Jewish immigration to Puerto Rico
- B'nai B'rith Latin America
- Latin American Muslims
- Pallache family

== Bibliography ==
- Mordechai Arbell, Dennis Channing Landis, Ann Phelps Barry Spanish and Portuguese Jews in the Caribbean and the Guianas: A Bibliography, Interamericas, 1999, ISBN 0-916617-52-1
- Mordechai Arbell The Portuguese Jews of Jamaica, Canoe Press, 2000, ISBN 976-8125-69-1
- Marjorie Agosín Memory, Oblivion, and Jewish Culture In Latin America, University of Texas Press, 2005, ISBN 0-292-70667-7
- Alan Fredric Benjamin Jews of the Dutch Caribbean: Exploring Ethnic Identity on Curaçao, Routledge, 2002, ISBN 0-415-27439-7
- Judah M. Cohen Through the Sands of Time: A History of the Jewish Community of St. Thomas, UPNE, 2004, ISBN 1-58465-341-8
- Judith Laikin Elkin. The Jews of Latin America (rev) Holmes & Meier, 1998. ISBN 0-8419-1369-2
- Ariel Segal Frielich Jews of the Amazon: Self-Exile in Earthly Paradise, The Jewish Publication Society, 1999, ISBN 0-8276-0669-9
- Jeffrey Lesser & Raanan Rein. Rethinking Jewish-Latin Americans. University of New Mexico Press, 2008. ISBN 978-0-8263-4401-4
- Jeffrey Lesser, Welcoming the Undesirables: Brazil and the Jewish Question. University of California Press, 1995
- Ruggiero, Kristin The Jewish Diaspora In Latin America and the Caribbean: Fragments of Memory, Sussex Academic Press, 2005, ISBN 1-84519-061-0
- The Jews and the Expansion of Europe to the West, 1450–1800, Berghahn Books, 2001, ISBN 1-57181-430-2
- Leo Spitzer. Hotel Bolivia. Hill and Wang, 1998. ISBN 0-8090-5545-7
