= Nissim Sharim =

Chilean actor (1932–2020)

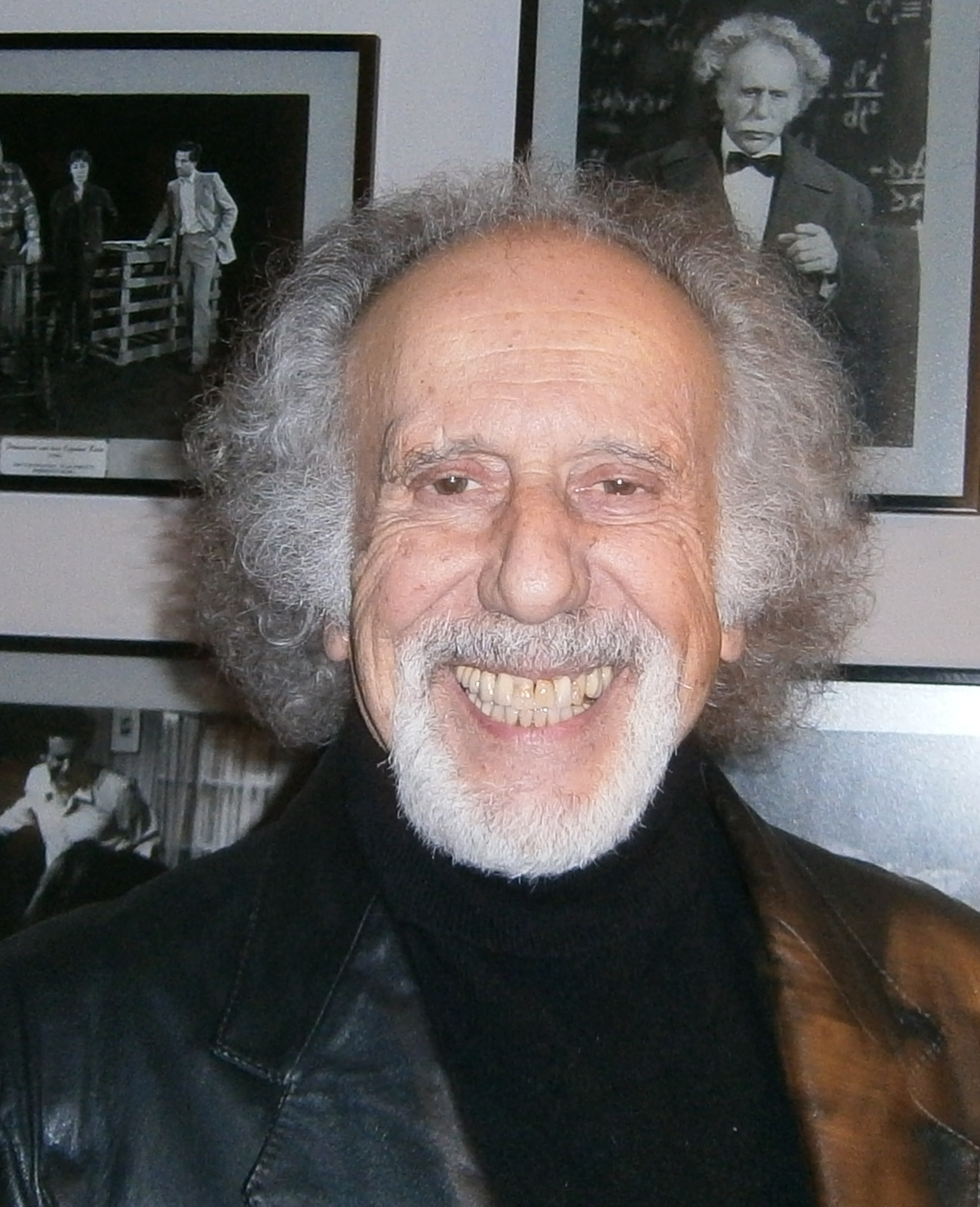
- Sharim in 2013
- Born: Nissim Sharim Paz; 20 July 1932; Santiago, Chile
- Died: 5 November 2020 (aged 88); Santiago, Chile
- Occupations: Actor, theatre director
- Years active: 1960–2020

Nissim Sharim Paz (20 July 1932 – 5 November 2020) was a Chilean actor and theater director. He was the director of Ictus theater company from 1962 to 2015, and is also known for having participated both in the TV show La Manivela and for a famous Banco Estado publicity together with Delfina Guzmán. He was also a prominent opponent of the military dictatorship.

== Biography ==
Nissim Sharim Paz was born on 20 July 1932 in Santiago, Chile. His grandfather was a Syrian Jew, and his father, Elías Sharim, was a Jew from Lebanon. Whereas his mother, Fortuna Paz, was from Egypt. He was the youngest of four brothers. His first two schools were the Windsor and Cambridge School. During his youth, he was part of the youth socialist zionist movement Hashomer Hatzair that marked him for its ideology and that, in turn, strengthened his bond with Judaism. In the meetings that he attended together with other young Chileans of Jewish descent, they offered training activities on the Jewish tradition.

At the age of 16, he entered the Law School of the University of Chile for five years. Although he graduated and served as a civil judge for a short period, he soon devoted himself to the theater. He started his acting career in 1962, when he entered at the Ictus theater, a company he directed until 2015. He married Argentine psychologist Juana Kovalskys and had two daughters: psychologist Dariela and actress Paula Sharim.

During the 1970s, he participated as protagonist in the humorous television program La Manivela, which was successful in audience. After the completion of the program, he dedicated himself to performing theater and participating in films. Among the films in which he participated are ¡Ufa con el sexo! (1968), Julio comienza en julio (1976), and Música y palabras (1978). In the 40-year Theater cycle of the Museum of Memory and Human Rights, the show Lindo país esquina con vista al mar from 1979 and directed by Sharim is presented. He was also a prominent opponent of Augusto Pinochet's military dictatorship, which caused harassment, persecution and even death threats.

During the 1980s, he was the face of an advertising campaign for Banco de Santiago that would pigeonhole him for years as the character "Perico", along with actress Delfina Guzmán and the catchphrase ¡cómprate un auto, Perico!. He also featured in films such as La candelaria (1982), Historia de un Roble Solo (1983), and Sexto A 1965 (1985). In politics, he was part of the central leadership of the Partido por la democracia (PPD) in 1989. He also served as a board member of Televisión Nacional de Chile (TVN) for four years. Additionally, he was a columnist for Diario Siete and a board member of TVN from 2000 to 2004.

In 2008, he published his only book, entitled Espera larga. In 2012, he made his final film appearance in El incontrolable mundo del azar. In 2015, after 53 years at the helm of Ictus, he stepped down as director due to health problems, handing the leadership to his daughter Paula. He also appeared in Familia moderna (2015) and Veinteañero a los 40 (2016). On 12 December 2016, he received the Rene Cassin Human Rights Award from B'nai B'rith Chile. In 2019, he was honored with the Luz y Memoria award by the Jewish Community of Chile.

== Death ==
Sharim died in Santiago on 5 November 2020, at the age of 88. His death was announced by his daughter, actress Paula Sharim, and confirmed by the Ictus theater company.

Following the announcement, the Ictus theater company—his professional home for more than 60 years—issued a statement: "As Ictus theater... we hope that he carries with him the recognition of an entire country that witnessed the resistance and struggle that he gave through theater," praising his "absolute dedication to the performing arts."

His wake was held in the comedy room of the Ictus theater, located in the Lastarria neighborhood. Regarding his lifelong connection to the venue, Sharim had previously stated:

"No death will ever be able to take me away from this theater, as none of those who were here have been taken away. Let's tell him at the same time that his effort to erase the footprints of the shoes that have stepped on this scene, is useless."

— Nissim Sharim,

== Filmography ==
=== Cinema ===
- ¡Ufa con el sexo! (1968)
- Julio comienza en julio (1976)
- Música y palabras (1978)
- La candelaria (1982)
- Historia de un Roble Solo (1983)
- Sexto A 1965 (1985)
- El incontrolable mundo del azar (2012)

=== Television ===
- La Manivela (1970)
- Página web (1998)
- Familia moderna (2015)
- Veinteañero a los 40 (2016)
