= Daniela Ramírez =

Chilean actress (born 1987)

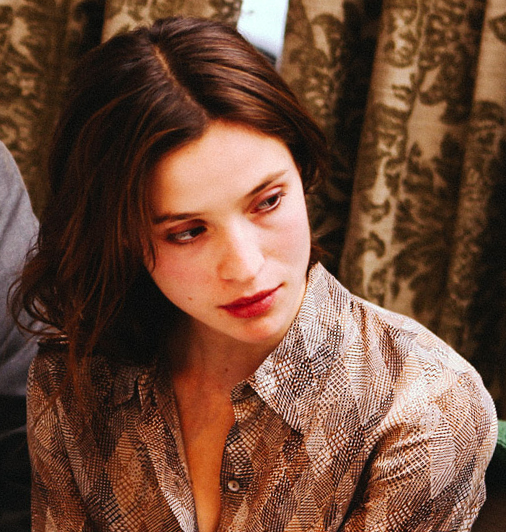
- Ramírez in 2013
- Born: Daniela Elizabeth Ramírez Rodríguez; January 11, 1987 (age 39); Santiago, Chile
- Occupation: Actor
- Years active: 2011–present

Daniela Elizabeth Ramírez Rodríguez (born 11 January 1987) is a Chilean film, theater and television actress. She starred in the series Los archivos del cardenal, for which she won an Altazor Award for best television actress, and also has performed as Isabel Allende in the biographical series Isabel (2021). She also starred on telenovelas such as Esperanza (2011) and Amanda (2016).

== Career ==
Daniela Ramírez was born in Santiago de Chile. She is the youngest of three siblings. At 16 she was a mother and she had Martín, her first and only child to date. He completed his secondary studies at the Centennial School of Maipú and graduated from acting at the ARCIS University in 2009. During the school period he made the montage "I am not killing anyone" with the company Teatro Malcriado, in which he gains recognition as best actress at the La Casa Theater School performance festival. In 2008 she participated in the European Dramaturgy Show in the City of Concepción, with the text "El padre" by Heiner Muller, directed by Cristian Torres and Francisco Albornoz. In the first semester of 2010, she is a collaborating professor at ARCIS University in the field of theater acting.

She started acting at the age of 14 when she read an ad in the newspaper where they were looking for young people from the age of 15 who wanted to participate in children's plays. She went to the casting and stayed, although she was always afraid that they would find out that she was a year younger. Finally, she stayed there until she was 18 years old. At that time, she already belonged to the theater workshops of the Centennial School of Maipú, where she lived almost her entire life.

It was precisely during her university days that she met Rodrigo Suzarte, her film teacher and director of the series Gen Mishima (TVN). He invited her to participate in some synopses of her films and it was that material of her that she saw the production of Los archivos del cardenal. Thanks to that, she was called to appear at the casting.

In July 2011, Ramírez made his debut on the state network TVN in the series Los archivos del cardenal, under the direction of Nicolás Acuña. It is centered on the years of the military dictatorship, where she is the protagonist, playing Laura Pedregal, a young social worker who works in the Vicariate of Solidarity to fight for the injustice that existed in the country.

Later, in August 2011, she starred in the TVN telenovela, Esperanza, winner of a fund from the National Television Council and the first Chilean telenovela to air in the afternoon, where she played a young Peruvian who comes to work as a domestic worker in a house in the upper neighborhood of Santiago, where her boss (Álvaro Escobar) is, without knowing it, the man with whom she had an affair 11 years ago in her homeland and from whom a son of the that he is unaware of its existence.

She participated in the film La Jubilada directed by Jairo Boisier.

In October, Ramírez also played Abigaíl Williams, the problematic protagonist of Las brujas de Salem, and with that role the actress who graduated from Arcis led the cast composed of Francisco Melo, Tomás Vidiella, Paola Volpato and Jaime McManus, in the theatrical bet of the production company Fiebre.

After having starred in Esperanza, Daniela Ramírez would continue in the telenovelas, continuing in Separados, a project that meant her debut in the nighttime soap operas of TVN.

In 2012, she was the protagonist of director Jorge Durán's film (Prohibido prohibir, 2006), which is tentatively named Police Romance, a Brazilian co-production thriller whose main setting is San Pedro de Atacama.

In September 2012, she starred in singer Mika's music video, "Origin of love," which was directed by Chilean director Cristián Jiménez and shot in Santiago and Valparaíso.

Later, she was confirmed for the second season of the HBO series Prófugos as the love interest of the main character who is played by Benjamín Vicuña. In 2013, Daniela Ramírez left TVN and negotiated with Channel 13, however, she asks to be linked to the public channel, asking for permission to record the second season of Los archivos del cardenal on TVN.

In 2016 she emigrated to Mega starring in the daytime telenovela called Amanda, which turned out to be a complete success and with the final episode setting unprecedented ratings for a daytime telenovela in Chile.

In 2019, and after the success of Amanda, she signed again with the AGTV Producciones production company, which this time, made productions for Channel 13, where she was the main protagonist for the new evening directed by Vicente Sabatini, Amor a la Catalán.

In 2021 she starred in the Amazon Prime biographic series Isabel, about Chilean writer Isabel Allende.

== Filmography ==
=== Film ===
Year	Title	Role	Director
2009	La Ñoko		
2012	La Jubilada		Jairo Boisier
2014	Romance policial	Florencia	Jorge Durán
2014	Hijo de Trauco	Aurelia	Alan Fischer
2014	Olvidados	Sofía	Carlos Bolado
2014	Aurora	Jimena	Rodrigo Sepúlveda
2014	Allende en su laberinto		Miguel Littín
2015	El botón de nácar		Patricio Guzmán
2015	En la gama de los grises	Soledad	Claudio Marcone
2015	Inside the Mind of a Psychopath	Journalist	Alejandro Torres
2015	La prima luce		Vincenzo Marra
2016	Madre	Diana	
2017	Crisis	Ofelia	
2017	Un dia cualquiera	Constanza	
2017	Ausencia	Carmen Arriagada	Claudio Marcone
2018	Swing	Camila	
2018	Enigma	Actriz recreación Laura	Ignacio Juricic Merillán
2020	Matar a Pinochet		Juan Ignacio Sabatini
2020	Detrás de la lluvia		Valeria Sarmiento
2022	Blanquita		Fernando Guzzoni
2024	Zafari	Ana	Mariana Rondón

=== Television ===
Television roles
Year	Title	Character	Role
2011–2012	Esperanza	Esperanza Reyes	Main role
2011–2014	Los archivos del cardenal	Laura Pedregal	Main role
2012–2013	Separados	Amanda Valenzuela	Supporting role
2013	Prófugos	Rocío	3 episodes
2013–2014	Secretos en el jardín	Sofía Ventura	Main cast
2014	La canción de tu vida	Camila Lorca	Episode: "Un amor violento"
2014	Los 80	Sybilla	7 episodes
2015	La poseída	Micaela Rojas	Supporting role
2016–2017	Amanda	Amanda Solís	Main role
2018–2019	Casa de muñecos	Alejandra Falco	Main cast
2019	Berko, el arte de callar	Divina Day	Main role
2019–2020	Amor a la Catalán	Dafne Catalán	Main role
2020	Inés del alma mía	Marina de Valdívia	2 episodes
2021	Demente	Valentina Spencer	Supporting role
2021	Isabel	Isabel Allende	Main role
2022	La ley de Baltazar	Antonia Rodríguez	Main role
2024	Secretos de familia	Elena Valdés	Main role

=== Music videos ===
Year	Title	Director	Artist(s)
2012	«Trampas para oso»	Jorge Riquelme Serrano	Mowat
2012	«Origin of Love»	Cristián Jiménez	Mika
2014	«Medusa»	Riff Producciones	Manuel García
2017	«Amor de Madrugada»	Hermanos Ibarra Roa	Villa Cariño
