= Memories of the Desert =

2014 film directed by Jorge Durán

Romance Policial
- International release poster
- Directed by: Jorge Durán
- Written by: Jorge Durán
- Produced by: Gisela Camara; Gabriel Flores Durán; Pedro Rossi
- Starring: Daniel de Oliveira; Daniela Ramírez; Álvaro Rudolphy
- Cinematography: Luís Abramo
- Edited by: Pedro Durán; Gabriel Flores Durán
- Music by: Fabiano Krieger; Lucas Marcier
- Production companies: El Desierto Filmes; Ceneca Produciones
- Distributed by: Pandora Filmes
- Release dates: 9 March 2014 (Miami International Film Festival); 4 June 2015 (Brazil)
- Running time: 98 minutes
- Country: Brazil
- Languages: Portuguese; Spanish

Memories of the Desert (Portuguese: Romance Policial) is a 2014 Brazilian-Chilean crime drama film directed and written by Jorge Durán. It stars Daniel de Oliveira as a young Brazilian writer named Antonio, who decides to go to the Atacama Desert in search of inspiration for a tale. Daniela Ramírez and Álvaro Rudolphy co-star in supporting roles. The film was first screened on 9 March 2014 at the Miami International Film Festival, and was released theatrically in Brazil on 4 June 2015.

== Plot ==
Antonio is a 30-year-old civil servant living in Rio de Janeiro, with a penchant for writing, who travels to the Atacama Desert in search of inspiration to write a novel. The arid and astonishing landscape leaves him in awe. One day, Antonio, hiking through the desert, hears suspicious noises and finds a dead man (whom he had met earlier in a bar). He is detained by Martínez, a local police officer, who forbids him to leave Chile or the village of San Pedro de Atacama, where he stays. Antonio also meets Florencia, a local bar-owner, with whom he develops a romantic relationship. The crime situation and his ongoing romance with Florencia help him write his tale and get mixed in it.

== Cast ==
- Daniel de Oliveira as Antonio
- Daniela Ramírez as Florencia
- Álvaro Rudolphy as Martínez
- Roxana Campos as Miriam
- Rogério Fróes as The Old Writer
- Nelson Polania as El Hombre (as Nelson Polanco)
- Victor Montero as Romo
- María Izquierdo as Florencia's Mother

== Awards and nominations ==
- Best Film – Bogotá Film Festival (nominated)
- The Knight Competition – Miami International Film Festival (nominated)
