= Blanquita =

2022 Chilean film by Fernando Guzzoni

- Theatrical release poster
- Directed by: Fernando Guzzoni
- Screenplay by: Fernando Guzzoni
- Produced by: Giancarlo Nasi; Pablo Zimbrón Alva; Donato Rotunno; Pascal Guerrin; Yves Darondeau; Emmanuel Priou; Beata Rzezniczek
- Starring: Laura López; Alejandro Goic; Amparo Noguera; Marcelo Alonso; Daniela Ramírez; Ariel Grandón
- Cinematography: Benjamín Echazarreta
- Edited by: Jarosław Kamiński; Soledad Salfate
- Music by: Chloé Thevenin
- Production companies: Quijote Films (CL); Tarantula Luxembourg; Bonne Pioche; Madants Sp. z o.o.; Varios Lobos (MX)
- Distributed by: New Europe Film Sales; Outsider Pictures
- Release dates: 5 September 2022 (Venice); 9 December 2022 (United States (limited))
- Running time: 99 minutes
- Countries: Chile; Mexico; Luxembourg; France; Poland
- Language: Spanish

Blanquita is a 2022 drama film directed by Fernando Guzzoni, starring Alejandro Goic, Amparo Noguera, Marcelo Alonso, Daniela Ramírez and Ariel Grandón. The film had its premiere on September 4, 2022 at the 79th Venice International Film Festival in the Horizon section, where it won an award for best screenplay.

It was released on December 9 at Cinema Village in New York City, and at Laemmle Glendale in Los Angeles. The film was selected as the Chilean entry for the Best International Feature Film at the 95th Academy Awards.

== Synopsis ==
The film is based on a real child prostitution scandal, the Spiniak case, which shook Chile in the early 2000s. It tells the story of Blanquita (Laura López), an 18-year-old resident of a foster home, who becomes the key witness in a scandal involving powerful businessmen and politicians.

== Cast ==
- Laura López as Blanquita
- Alejandro Goic as Manuel
- Amparo Noguera as Piedad
- Marcelo Alonso as Fiscal Herrera
- Daniela Ramírez as Fiscal Lagos
- Ariel Grandón as Carlos

== Release ==
The film had its world premiere at the 79th Venice International Film Festival on 5 September 2022. It also made it to 'World Cinema' section of 27th Busan International Film Festival where it was screened on 9 October, and 'International Perspective' section of 46th São Paulo International Film Festival, where it was screened on 22 October 2022. Later in December, it was invited to the 28th Kolkata International Film Festival, where it was screened on 17 December 2022, and to the 34th Palm Springs International Film Festival to be screened on January 7, 2023.

The film was released theatrically in New York and Los Angeles on December 9, 2022 by Outsider Pictures.

== Reception ==
On the review aggregator Rotten Tomatoes website, the film has an approval rating of 100% based on 24 reviews, with an average rating of 7.5/10. On Metacritic, it has a weighted average score of 77 out of 100 based on 6 reviews, indicating "generally favorable reviews".

Marta Bałaga reviewing for Cineuropa wrote, "Blanquita is devoid of colour and seemingly also emotion, which makes perfect sense". Bałaga praised the director for execution of the film writing, "it’s the fact that his (director) well-executed film is not exactly explicit". She opined that not making film explicit would make more people see it. Wendy Ide reviewing for ScreenDaily praised the film, writing, "An atmospheric thriller which is carried by an assured central performance from López."

Ronda Racha Penrice reviewing for TheWrap praised the acting of Laura López writing, "López perfectly strikes a great balance between Blanca’s toughness and vulnerability". Penrice commended Fernando Guzzoni for "using all his talent to amplify the sad reality of social injustice". She further wrote that Guzzoni "created a compelling thriller that probes deep, posing critical questions about society’s continual failure to protect children." She praised the cinematography of Benjamín Echazarreta writing, "The impressive cinematography by Benjamín Echazarreta has a moodiness that highlights the inherent drama of Blanquita."

== Awards and nominations ==
Year	Award	Category	Recipient(s)	Result	Ref.
2022	Venice Film Festival	Best Screenplay	Fernando Guzzoni	Won	
2022	Huelva Ibero-American Film Festival	Golden Columbus	Blanquita	Won	

== See also ==
- List of submissions to the 95th Academy Awards for Best International Feature Film
- List of Chilean submissions for the Academy Award for Best International Feature Film
