= Operación Triunfo (Chilean TV series) =

- Title card
- Also known as: OT Chile
- Genre: Reality television
- Created by: Toni Cruz; Josep Maria Mainat; Joan Ramon Mainat
- Based on: Operación Triunfo
- Developed by: Coty Cagliolo
- Presented by: Álvaro Escobar
- Country of origin: Chile
- Original language: Spanish

Production
- Executive producer: Alfredo Escobar
- Production locations: Santiago, Chile
- Running time: 60-90 minutes
- Production companies: Red televisiva Megavisión S.A. Endemol

Original release
- Network: Mega
- Release: June 9 – September 14, 2003

Related
- Operación triunfo España

Operación Triunfo (lit: Operation Triumph), also known as OT Chile, was a short-lived Chilean reality television programme aired on Mega from 9 June to 14 September 2003. This series was an adaptation of the Spanish television franchise Operación Triunfo. It was presented by Álvaro Escobar and the winners were Mónica Rodríguez and César Ávila.

Until 2008, 5 editions were held, but in 2018, the programme come back and until 2020, 3 editions were held
