= Buscando a María =

- Genre: Romance; Drama
- Created by: Víctor Carrasco
- Written by: Carlos Galofré; Sandra Arriagada; Iván Salas Moya
- Directed by: Roberto Morales
- Starring: Isidora Urrejola; Ricardo Fernández; Cristián Carvajal; Daniela Palavecino; Nicolás Brown
- Country of origin: Chile
- Original language: Spanish
- No. of episodes: 65

Production
- Production locations: Santiago; Quintay (Chile)
- Running time: 60 minutes

Original release
- Network: Chilevisión
- Release: December 9, 2015 – March 11, 2016

Buscando a María (English title: Searching For María) is a 2015 Chilean telenovela produced and which will be broadcast by Chilevisión. The story is created by Víctor Carrasco, Carlos Galofré, Ivan Salas y Sandra Arriagada. Directed by Roberto Morales.

Tomás Arriagada, Isidora Urrejola and Ricardo Fernández are main protagonist. With Cristián Carvajal, Daniela Palavecino and Lorena Capetillo will stars as the antagonists.

The telenovela production began July 14, 2014. It premiered on December 9, 2015. The telenovela finished on March 11, 2016.

It aired in Africa on Eva Channel on DSTV in English (141) and Portuguese (508) under the title Searching For Maria. It began to re-air on Eva+ (English142) and Eva+ (Portuguese 509) from November 1, 2016 and received much praise on Eva's Facebook page as many voted it as their favourite telenovela on Eva becoming a fan-favourite.

== History ==
The story follows the life of Maria Barraza (Isidora Urrejola), a good woman who suffers the aggression of her husband Evaristo (Cristián Carvajal). The plot starts when Evaristo throws his son into the sea.

His son is the kind Benjamin "Chiripa" Maulen (Tomas Arriagada); everyone thinks he's dead, but it is not. He is alive and decides to go to Santiago to find his mother.

== Cast ==
- Isidora Urrejola as María Barraza Cifuentes
- Ricardo Fernández as Pedro Montecinos Briones
- Tomás Arriagada as Benjamín "The Chiripa" Maulén Barraza
- Cristián Carvajal as Evaristo Maulén - Main Antagonist
- Daniela Palavecino as Bernandita Prieto - Antagonist
- Carlos Díaz as Sergio Montecinos Briones
- Lorena Capetillo as Paola Galdames - Former Antagonist
- Schlomit Baytelman as Marta Briones
- Malucha Pinto as Raquel Cifuentes
- Nicolás Brown as Marcelo Tapia Mardones - R.I.P
- Alberto Castillo as Roberto González
- Loreto Araya as Irma Flores
- Eliana Palermo as Flora Mardones
- Claudio Castellón as Rubén Morales
- Catalina Martín as Juana Canales
- Joaquín Saldaña as Joaquín Montencinos
- Alejandro Trejo
- Francesca Poloni as Natalia Salinas
