= Schlomit Baytelman =

Chilean actress

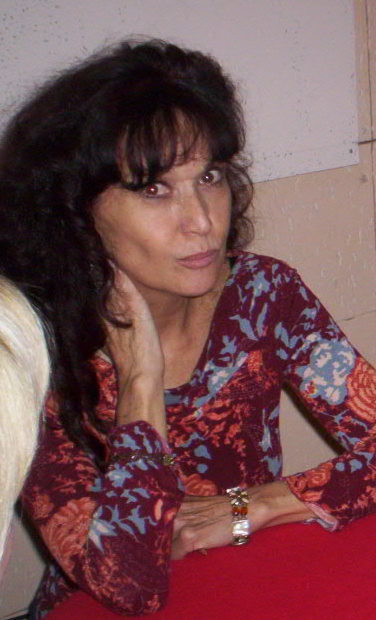
- Baytelman in 2005
- Born: Shlomit Baytelman Albala; November 30, 1949 (age 76); Afula, Israel
- Occupations: Actor, theatre director
- Years active: 1971–present

Shlomit Baytelman Albala (Hebrew: שלומית בייטלמן; Yiddish: שלאָמיט בייַטעלמאַן; born Afula, November 30, 1949) is an Israeli-born Chilean actress, director, and writer who became a naturalized Chilean citizen. She gained recognition in the mid-1970s as a sex symbol in Chilean cinema, particularly for her role in the film Julio comienza en julio, and later for an extensive career in television.

== Biography ==
Baytelman was born in Israel in 1949 and immigrated to Chile in 1951, where she built her entire career. She is the daughter of Bernardo Baytelman and Eliana Albala. In 1966, she was recognized as the best school actress in Santiago. Baytelman graduated from the Theater School of the University of Chile in 1971 and made her debut in La Remienda and Tres Tristes Tigres, both by Alejandro Sieveking. In 1972 and 1973, she participated in the productions Chiloé cielos cubiertos, by María Asunción Requena, and Las troyanas by Euripides. Although best known for her extensive theatrical career, Baytelman gained recognition for her role as a prostitute in the film Julio comienza en julio, directed by Silvio Caiozzi.

On television, she stood out in telenovelas such as La gran mentira (1982), El juego de la vida, and Las hederas (both in 1983), El milagro de vivir (1990), and Rompecorazón (1994). However, her most significant success came from her role as Carla in the popular TVN sitcom Los Venegas, where she remained for two decades. In 2019, Baytelman was seriously injured in a hit-and-run accident with a cyclist. After a lengthy rehabilitation, she returned to acting in 2020.

== Filmography ==
=== Films ===
Films
| Year | Title | Character | Director |
|---|---|---|---|
| 1972 | Estado de sitio | Militante | Costa-Gavras |
| 1977 | Julio comienza en julio | María | Silvio Caiozzi |
| 1987 | Imagen latente | | Pablo Perelman |
| 1988 | Consuelo | | Luis R. Vera |
| 1990 | País de octubre | | Daniel de la Vega |
| 1997 | Takilleitor | Shlomit | Daniel de la Vega |
| 2001 | Antonia | Psiquiatra | Mario Andrade |
| 2007 | Irrespirable | | Matías Pinochet |
| 2007 | Los Andes no creen en Dios | Clota | Antonio Eguino |
| 2010 | Ni una caricia | | Beatriz Maldonado |
| 2010 | Perro muerto | | Camilo Becerra |
| 2011 | Marco quiere mucho a Iris | | |
| 2011 | Have You Seen Lupita? (¿Alguien ha visto a Lupita?) | Tía Manuela | Gonzalo Justiniano |
| 2011 | El circuito de Román | Carmen | Sebastián Brahm |
| 2012 | No | Cameo | Pablo Larraín |
| 2013 | I Am from Chile | Marta | Gonzalo Díaz |
| 2014 | Olvidados | Gloria | Carlos Bolado |
| 2016 | Argentino Ql | Sofía | Patricio Pimienta |
| 2016 | Secos | | Galut Alarcón |
| 2020 | Homemade | | Pablo Larraín |
| 2020 | El estado imaginario | | Alan Fischer |

=== Telenovelas ===
Telenovela
| Year | Telenovela | Character | Director | Channel |
|---|---|---|---|---|
| 1976 | Sol tardío | Nancy Fernández | José Caviedes | TVN |
| 1978 | El secreto de Isabel | Paula Narváez | José Caviedes | TVN |
| 1981 | Casagrande | Renata | Ricardo de la Fuente | Canal 13 |
| 1982 | La gran mentira | Cecilia Benavides | Herval Rossano | TVN |
| 1983 | El juego de la vida | Paola Arratia | Herval Rossano | TVN |
| 1983 | Las herederas | Patricia Duval | Regis Bartizzaghi | Canal 13 |
| 1985 | Matrimonio de papel | Carolina Dellany | Óscar Rodríguez | Canal 13 |
| 1988 | Vivir así | Ana María Maturana | Vicente Sabatini | Canal 13 |
| 1990 | El milagro de vivir | Sofía Rivadeneira | Vicente Sabatini | TVN |
| 1991 | Volver a empezar | Jessica Morel | Vicente Sabatini | TVN |
| 1993 | Jaque mate | Mimí Pons | Vicente Sabatini | TVN |
| 1994 | Rompecorazón | Josefina "Chepa" Arestizábal | Vicente Sabatini | TVN |
| 1996 | Loca piel | Diana Balbontín | María Eugenia Rencoret | TVN |
| 1999 | Aquelarre | Mariola Bulnes | María Eugenia Rencoret | TVN |
| 2000 | Santo ladrón | Leonor Valdés | María Eugenia Rencoret | TVN |
| 2004 | Hippie | Mónica Grez | Cristián Galaz | Canal 13 |
| 2006 | Entre medias | María Teresa Fernández | Óscar Rodríguez | TVN |
| 2008 | Hijos Del Monte | Rosa Miranda | Víctor Huerta | TVN |
| 2010 | Mujeres de lujo | Casta Diva | Patricio González | Chilevisión |
| 2011 | Infiltradas | Libertad León | Patricio González | Chilevisión |
| 2011 | Esperanza | Trinidad Vergara | Claudio López de Lérida | TVN |
| 2012 | La sexóloga | Simona Rossino | Vicente Sabatini | Chilevisión |
| 2015 | Buscando a María | Marta Briones | Roberto Morales | Chilevisión |
| 2017 | La colombiana | Carmen Gloria Zurita | Germán Barriga | TVN |
| 2019 | 100 días para enamorarse | Lourdes Cotapos | Enrique Bravo | Mega |

=== Series and unitaries ===
TV Serie
| Year | Serie | Character | Channel |
|---|---|---|---|
| 2003 | Cuentos de mujeres | Elsa / Ivette | TVN |
| 1990–2010 | Los Venegas | Carla Alcázar | TVN |
| 1998 | Los Cárcamo | Corina | Canal 13 |
| 2010 | Cartas de mujer | Irene | Chilevisión |
| 2013 | Maldito Corazón | Gladiola | Chilevisión |
| 2014 | El hombre de tu vida | Luciana | Canal 13 |
| 2015 | Los años dorados | Silvana | UCV Televisión |
| 2017 | Papá Mono | Teresa Larrondo | Canal 13 |
