= Roberto Martínez Vásquez =

Chilean serial rapist

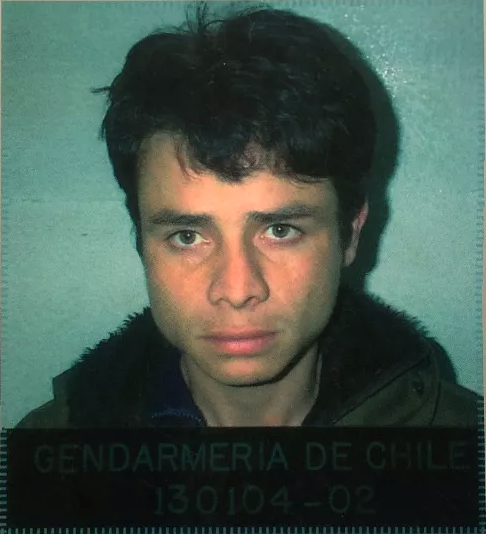
- Martínez' mugshot, taken by the Chilean Gendarmerie.
- Born: José Roberto Martínez Vásquez; 19 April 1976; Central Santiago, Santiago, Chile
- Died: 13 December 2002 (aged 26); CCP Colina II, Colina, Chile
- Cause of death: Suicide by hanging
- Resting place: Metropolitan Cemetery
- Other names: Tila; Psychopath of La Dehesa
- Occupations: Serial robber and rapist
- Status: Deceased

Details
- Victims: 6 burglarized 6 raped 1 murdered
- Span of crimes: 1991–2002
- Country: Chile
- Location: Various high-income sectors of Santiago
- Date apprehended: 13 June 2002
- Imprisoned at: CCP Colina II, Colina, Chile

José Roberto Martínez Vásquez (19 April 1976 – 13 December 2002), known by his friends as "Tila" and posthumously referred to as the "Psychopath of La Dehesa" was a Chilean serial rapist and robber. Born and raised in poverty, he would usually target high-class homes (usually located in Central Santiago, Las Condes, Vitacura, and Lo Barnechea) as part of a social vendetta. He was arrested multiple times, but was ultimately detained in June 2002 for the murder of his ex-girlfriend, 16-year-old Maciel Zúñiga, which occurred the previous month. He committed suicide by hanging in his prison cell during a blackout in December of that year.

His long history of violence, coupled with his antisocial tendencies and anti-systematic modus operandi, have been used as a failed example of Chile's National Service of Minors (Servicio Nacional de Menores, SENAME), which is in charge of detainees under 18 years of age, the Chilean Gendarmerie, which is in charge of Chile's prison system as a whole, and the Chilean economic system as a whole as someone who was "left behind".

== Biography ==
Roberto Martínez Vásquez was born in Central Santiago as the son of José Martínez Yaeger, a watch merchant, and Matilde Martínez Martínez, being the third of four children. When his younger brother, Alberto, was born, José Martínez left home, effectively becoming absent in the life of his son Roberto. His mother suffered from schizophrenia and typically physically abused her children.

For his first years of life, he grew up with his mother, his sister and two brothers, and three maternal uncles, all homosexual men active as transvestite prostitutes. At the age of 2, he was the victim of sexual abuse by one of these uncles, and at 4, he was arrested for his first time for the crime of vagrancy. The following year, he was removed from his biological family and was raised by a family from Valdivia, also abusive, until he was 10 years old. Already suffering from antisocial tendencies and normalized to violence by his family upbringing, at the age of 15 he committed his first home robbery, also raping the home's resident, a German teacher. At 17 years old, he escaped from the San Miguel Diagnostic Orientation Center (Centro de Orientación Diagnóstica, COD), after which he was captured and transferred to the section for minors in the Puente Alto prison. He was arrested 10 times before he was 18 years old.

Upon becoming of legal age, he showed a change in attitude, entering a rehabilitation program in which he won prizes for drawing and writing poetry and music. His hope of reintegrating into Chilean society ended soon, when he was arrested for a violent home robbery committed in March 1994, when he was 17, in Lo Curro. He was held at the Colina I Penitentiary Compliance Center (Centro de Cumplimiento Penitenciario, CCP). According to gendarme Luis Arias, Martínez was respected by the other prisoners and even considered something of a leader in his time as a recluse. He read mechanic books, planning to become a car thief. Later, he was transferred to CCP Colina II due to his high danger as an inmate. He regained his freedom for the last time at age 25.

Less than a month after regaining his freedom, he broke into an apartment in the Jardines de Vitacura building. After tying up his victims, the home's residents, he felt frustrated by his lack of collaboration, for which he raped the woman of the house in front of her husband (already forming his modus operandi) and went to sleep. The next day, he left the place via subway, taking a 9-month break before committing his next robbery. This pattern was repeated several times, amounting to a total year of 4 robberies, in which he raped 5 women. At this time he lived in the southern sector of Santiago, moving to the better-income sectors to attack homeowners.

On May 8, 2002, the remains of Maciel Zúñiga Pacheco, the then-partner of Roberto Martínez, were found in the Uno Sur passageway in the José María Caro population in Lo Espejo. According to Martínez, he killed her after she decided to abort their unborn child. He convinced her to let him tie up her hands as a sexual practice and proceeded to stab her in the throat. After a couple of hours, he dismembered and burned her corpse. After committing two other robberies, on 12 June, he was arrested for the murder of Zúñiga by the Investigations Police (Policía de Investigaciones, PDI) of Chile, who, after a couple of weeks of investigations, realized that he was the most wanted serial rapist in the nation.

He was confined in the Colina II Penitentiary Compliance Center until 13 December 2002, when, during a power outage, he took his own life by hanging himself with the cord of an electric typewriter.

The Chilean film El Tila: Fragmentos de un psicópata (2015) is inspired by his biography, where actor Nicolás Zárate plays his role.
