= Beth Shalom Temple (Havana) =

Conservative synagogue in Havana, Cuba

- Hebrew: בית הכנסת בית שלום; Spanish: Gran Sinagoga Bet Shalom
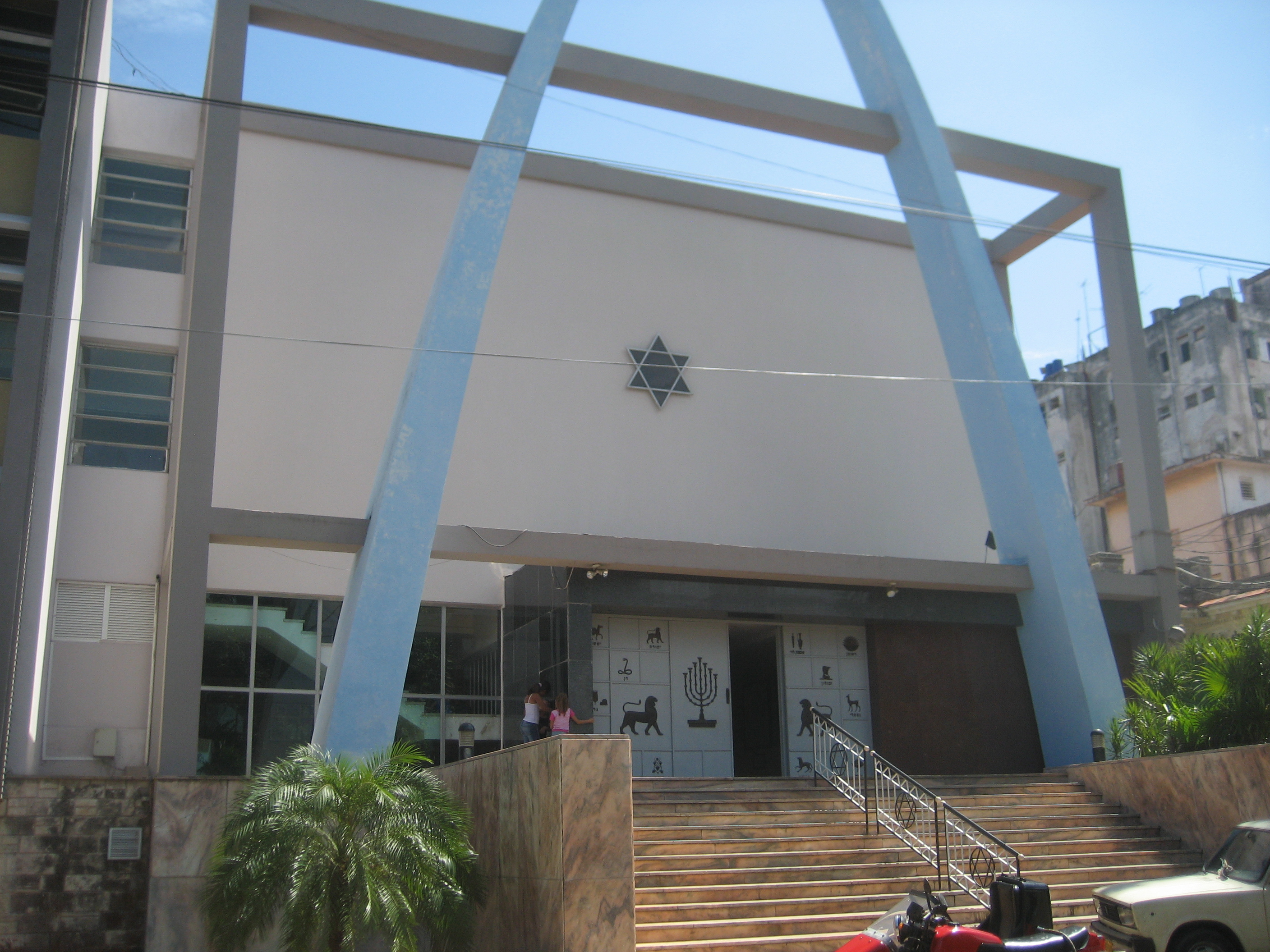
- The synagogue exterior, 2008

- Location of the synagogue in Cuba

Religion
- Affiliation: Conservative Judaism
- Rite: Nusach Ashkenaz
- Ecclesiastical or organizational status: Synagogue
- Status: Active

Location
- Location: Calle I Esq. 13, Vedado, Havana 10400
- Country: Cuba
- Interactive map of Beth Shalom Temple
- Coordinates: 23°08′30″N 82°23′22″W

Architecture
- Type: Synagogue architecture
- Style: Modernist
- Established: 1904 (as a congregation)
- Groundbreaking: 1951
- Completed: 1953

Specifications
- Capacity: 300 seats
- Materials: Cement-block

Beth Shalom Temple (Hebrew: בית הכנסת בית שלום, romanized: Beit haKnesset Beit Shalom; Spanish: Gran Sinagoga Bet Shalom), commonly referred to as El Patronato, is a Conservative Jewish congregation and synagogue, located in the Vedado neighbourhood of downtown Havana, Cuba.

The temple was established in 1904, with the current temple being built in the 1950s. It has been described as Cuba's "main synagogue."

== History ==
Jews arrived in Cuba shortly after the expulsion of Jews from Spain in 1492. Subsequent waves of Portuguese Jews from Brazil and Dutch Jews arrived in Cuba from the 16th through 19th centuries. Ashkenazi Jews from Europe started arriving in Cuba, usually via the United States, following the Spanish-American War. The Beth Shalom congregation was established in 1904.

The synagogue originally opened its doors in 1953 and was among the largest Jewish houses of worship in Havana. The temple's soaring Romanesque features fused European and Moorish-Spanish elements made it a unique, hybrid Modernist style.

By the 1980s, however, shifting political tides had led to a significant decrease in the Jewish population. In 1981, the state acquired a large portion of the building to establish the Bertolt Brecht Cultural Center. The much smaller Jewish population resulted in a lack of upkeep. In 1999 the building received extensive renovations with support from benefactors like the American Jewish Joint Distribution Committee and under the guidance of Shmuel Szteinhendler.

With the relaxation of religious restrictions in Cuba, Temple Beth Shalom led a revival of public Jewish expression. The temple continues to be a presence which sustains the Cuban Jewish community. The building also houses a library of Jewish and Hebrew books.

Temple Beth Shalom receives many international vicitors, and has been visited by celebrities such as Steven Spielberg, Sean Penn, Fidel Castro and Raul Castro.

As of 2017, the congregation does not have a rabbi, there are no rabbis residing in Cuba.

== See also ==
- History of the Jews in Cuba
- List of synagogues in Cuba
