= Inside the Mind of a Psychopath =

- Promotional release poster
- Directed by: Alejandro Torres
- Written by: Alejandro Torres
- Produced by: Felipe Morales
- Starring: Nicolás Zárate
- Cinematography: Vicente Mayo
- Edited by: Martín Bohte
- Music by: Roberto Torres
- Production companies: Cinepsis; Escuela de Cine de Chile; MG Filmicas
- Distributed by: Storyboard Media
- Release dates: August 26, 2015 (SANFIC); July 7, 2016 (Chile)
- Running time: 96 minutes
- Country: Chile
- Language: Spanish

Inside the Mind of a Psychopath (Spanish: El Tila: Fragmentos de un psicópata, lit. 'Tila: Fragments of a psychopath') is a 2015 Chilean psychological thriller film written and directed by Alejandro Torres Contreras in his directorial debut. It is based on the life of the real-world serial rapist and eventual murderer Roberto "Tila" Martínez Vásquez, who would frequently break into houses throughout high-class neighborhoods of Santiago de Chile during the 90s and early 2000s as part of a social vendetta. It stars Nicolás Zárate as the titular character, accompanied by Daniela Ramírez, Rodrigo Soto and Daniel Alcaíno.

== Plot ==
An exhausted young man (Nizolás Zárate) is seen riding on a bicycle throughout a lower-class neighborhood in Santiago, where he eventually gives up and sits down before he is arrested by a squadron of Investigations Police officers. We cut to his prison cell, where he has dozens of drawings and newspaper clippings about his case. His defense attorney (Rodrigo Soto) walks into his cell, where, over the course of the movie, they have various discussions, recounting his criminal career and the wider story of his life, frequently cutting back and forth from his memories and his state in prison.

His life story begins with the recurrent abuse he suffered at the hands of his mother (Jeanette Castillo), a schizophrenic woman, and his time spent at the National Service of Minors (Chile's public service in charge of chile protection and juvenile detention), where he excelled in artistic social programs. Eventually, he is let free and tries attending an artistic career at a university, but it is denied to him for not having finished high school. "Tila", as he would be known, moves to Santiago and begins breaking into high-class houses, stealing from them, and raping the women at gunpoint, often forcing their husbands to observe. He is eventually caught and sent to prison, where he is frequently abused and taken advantage of by Gendarmerie workers. He is eventually freed again, but returns to the same activities, now becoming even more cold and unfeeling. He eventually begins dating a high schooler (Tiare Pino), who frequently arrives by his house to have sex and consume cocaine paste. At one point, she reveals to having been pregnant with his child, but had a clandestine abortion. "Tila" snaps at her and smashes her head with a hammer, immediately killing her. He later cannibalizes her remains, eating her uterus in an attempt to "find his son". Later on, he goes to a desolate sector, where he burns what is left of her remains.

Now in prison and under constant surveillance, "Tila" awaits his incoming life sentence in his cell. Outside of the prison, a truck crashes into an electricity pole, leaving the entire city of Colina (where he is being held) in a blackout. He seizes the opportunity and hangs himself in the dark using the cable of an electric typewriter which he had been using to write poetry and press statements throughout the movie. The prison workers and his defense attorney are furious upon finding his body, as he evaded his punishment. The film then shows a time lapse of his tomb, where flowers and decorations left by visitors rot away, only leaving a wooden sign proclaiming "He didn't pay" (No pagó), until "Tila"'s remains are dug up and replaced. (Note: In real life, Martínez's remains were dug up from his grave at the Metropolitan Cemetery of Santiago and transferred to a common grave in 2013, after his family stopped making regular payments to the cemetery, citing that the cost was too much for them to handle. Alejandro Torres, the film's director, was filming the final scenes of the movie, and managed to film this scene just before he was dug up.)

In the final sequence of the film, we cut back to "Tila" in a prison call, where an intrigued journalist (played by Daniela Ramírez) interrogates him and directly asks him if he enjoys the notoriety given to him by the media. "Tila" simply gives a slight smile.

== Cast ==
The actors participating in this film are:

- Nicolás Zárate as Roberto "Tila" Martínez
  - Fabián Sanhueza as a younger Tila
- Daniel Alcaíno as Judge
- Daniela Ramírez as Journalist
- Rodrigo Soto as Defense Attorney
- Jorge Becker as Prosecutor
- Tiare Pino as Amelia
- Rodrigo Alarcón as Security Guard
- Norma Araya as Raped Woman
- Jeanette Castillo as Tila's Mom
- Gladys de Sanhueza as Nanny
- Teresa Díaz as Tila's Aunt
- Christopher Estay as Journalist 1
- Sebastián Echeverría as Journalist 2
- Damaris Torres as Journalist 3
- Ignacio Echegoyen as Journalist 4
- Trinidad González as 'Casa Grande' Woman
- Barbara Vera as Foster Home Teacher
- Alejandro Montes as Department Man
- Bárbara Santander as Department Woman

== Release ==
Inside the Mind of a Psychopath had its world premiere on August 26, 2015, at the 11th Santiago International Film Festival, then was screened on April 20, 2016, at the 18th Buenos Aires International Independent Film Festival. It was commercially released on July 7, 2016, in Chilean theaters. The film, which explores the themes such as social and economic isolation and how they can lead to crime, has been compared to Jackal of Nahueltoro (1969), a film based on the real life case of farmer Jorge Valenzuela Torres, who killed his domestic partner and her five children in a drunken rage, sometimes cited as "the best Chilean film of all time".

== Accolades ==
Year	Award / Festival	Category	Recipient	Result	Ref.
2015	Santiago International Film Festival	Best Actor	Nicolás Zárate	Won	
2017	Caleuche Awards	Best Leading Actor	Nicolás Zárate	Nominated	
2017	Caleuche Awards	Best Supporting Actress	Trinidad González	Nominated	
