= Esperanza (Chilean TV series) =

- Also known as: El destino del amor
- Genre: Telenovela
- Developed by: TVN; My Friend
- Directed by: María Eugenia Rencoret
- Starring: Daniela Ramírez; Álvaro Escobar; Íngrid Cruz; Teresita Reyes; José Martínez; Lorena Capetillo; Schlomit Baytelman; Patricio Achurra; Osvaldo Silva; Marcelo Valdivieso
- Opening theme: «Esperanza» by La Guacha
- Country of origin: Chile
- Original language: Spanish
- No. of episodes: 106

Production
- Running time: 60 minutes

Original release
- Network: TVN
- Release: 29 August 2011 – 23 January 2012

Esperanza (English: Hope) is a 2011 Chilean telenovela produced and broadcast by TVN.

== Cast ==
- Daniela Ramírez as Esperanza Reyes Varela.
- Alvaro Escobar as Juan Pablo Marticorena.
- Íngrid Cruz as Beatriz Solovera Vergara.
- José Martínez as Elías Rocco Salazar.
- Patricio Achurra as Génaro Solovera.
- Schlomit Baytelman as Trinidad Vergara.
- Osvaldo Silva as Ulises Leighton Villanueva.
- Teresita Reyes as Carmen Salazar.
- Erto Pantoja as Anselmo Quispe.
- Lorena Capetillo as Susana Farías.
- Marcelo Valdivieso as Héctor "Tito" Arguedas.
- Claudio González as Luis Reyes.
- Victor Montero as Jesús Vargas.
- Matías López as Ignacio Marticorena.
- Patricio Ossa as Ariel Reyes Reyes / Ariel Marticorena Reyes.
- Sebastián Gallardo as Rodrigo Marticorena Solovera.
- Max Meriño as Doctor Arrau.
- María José León as Cristina Salvatierra.
- Otilio Castro as Samuel Carrillo.
- Elvira Cristi as Bernardita Guzmán.
- Casandra Montt as Vilma, secretary of Juan Pablo.
- María Luisa Mayol as Dolores "Luly" Fernandez.
- Rodrigo Riffo Carrasco as Diego
- Verónica Moraga as Elvira.
- Simoney Romero as Mayra.
- Ernesto Gutiérrez as Camionero que ayuda a Ariel.
- Laura Olazábal as Mercedes, mother of Esperanza
- Max Meriño as Doctor Arrau
