= Familia moderna =

Chilean remake of the American TV series Modern Family

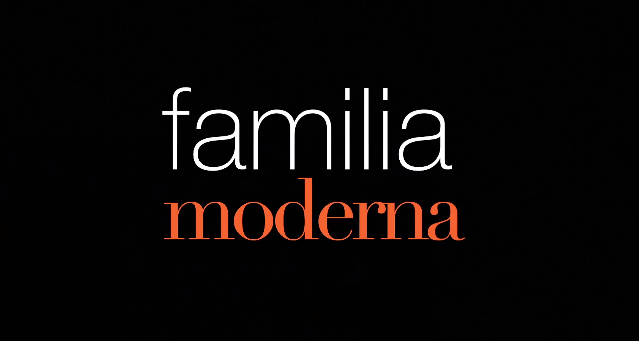
- Genre: Comedy; Family; Mockumentary; Sitcom
- Based on: Modern Family by Christopher Lloyd and Steven Levitan
- Written by: Rodrigo Gijón; Francisco Bobadilla
- Directed by: Diego Rougier
- Creative director: Herval Abreu
- Starring: Patricio Contreras; Nidyan Fabregat; Mariana Loyola; Álvaro Escobar; Nicolás Saavedra; Mario Soto
- Country of origin: Chile
- Original language: Spanish
- No. of seasons: 2
- No. of episodes: 48

Production
- Executive producer: Jimena Oto
- Producer: Tomás Macan
- Running time: 45 minutes
- Production companies: 20th Century Fox International Television; Red Televisiva Megavisión

Original release
- Network: Mega
- Release: December 3, 2015 – 2016

Related
- Modern Family (United States)

Familia moderna (English: Modern Family) is a Chilean television series based on the American sitcom Modern Family which aired on ABC. It is produced and broadcast by Mega since December 3, 2015, starring Patricio Contreras, Mariana Loyola, Nicolás Saavedra and Álvaro Escobar in the lead roles.

== Cast ==
- Patricio Contreras as José "Pepe" Luis Gallo
- Álvaro Escobar as Juan Pablo "Lete" Letelier
- Mariana Loyola as Paula Gallo
- Nicolás Saavedra as Gustavo "Gus" Gallo
- Mario Soto as Fernando "Feña" Navarro
- Nidyan Fabregat as Sara "Sarita" Astudillo
- Valeska Díaz as Laura Letelier Gallo
- Ian Morong as Luis García "Chito" Astudillo
- Rosita Vial as Javiera "Javi" Letelier Gallo
- Luca Yaconi as Luca Letelier Gallo
- Antonella Castillo as Antonia "Anto" Gallo Prieto
- María Izquierdo as Tete Gallo
