= Álvaro Escobar =

Chilean actor

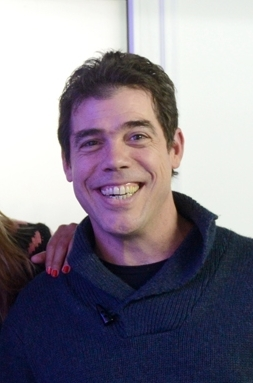
- Escobar in 2012
- Born: Álvaro Escobar Rufatt; December 16, 1966 (age 58); Washington DC, United States
- Occupation(s): Actor, politician, television presenter, radio personality, journalist, lawyer and musician.
- Years active: 1992–

Álvaro Escobar Rufatt (born December 16, 1966) is a Chilean actor, television presenter, lawyer, musician, journalist, radio personality and politician. He was a deputy of the Republic of Chile for District No. 20, which included the communes of Cerrillos, Estación Central and Maipú during the 2006–2010 period. He is mainly known as an actor and television presenter, although he has been involved in many professional activities.

== Early life ==
Álvaro Escobar Rufatt is the second of three children conceived by Fernando Escobar and Cecilia Rufatt. He was born in the United States on December 16, 1966. For his pre-basic, primary and secondary education, he attended schools in Washington, Panama City, Asunción and Santiago de Chile, where he graduated in 1984. Until that date, the titles of U-16 champion of North American soccer (1981) and the militancy in the lower divisions of the University of Chile (1983–1984) encouraged his decision to make a career in professional soccer.

In 1986, his commitment to the convulsed political events of the time and his desire to contribute to the recovery of democracy advised him to enter the Law School of the University of Chile. Two years later, he would be elected general secretary of his Student Center and would be part of the student movement that promoted the democratic option for the 1988 Chilean national plebiscite. To that end, just a few months before October 5, he responded to the call of the socialist leader Ricardo Lagos to register an instrumental political party, the Party for Democracy, destined to ensure the transparency of the plebiscite.

In 1989 and 1990, he was a pre-candidate for the presidency of the Federation of Students of the University of Chile (FECH), promoting the mechanism of primary elections to define the candidates to lead the student organization.

In 1990, he graduated from the school of law and the following year he was approved as a regular student in the theatrical acting career at the academy directed by Fernando González Mardones. At the same time, he studied for the law degree exam which he took on September 25, 1992. In addition to his memory on the tax hearings of the Royal Court of the 17th century, he obtained a degree in Legal and Social Sciences.

== Media career ==
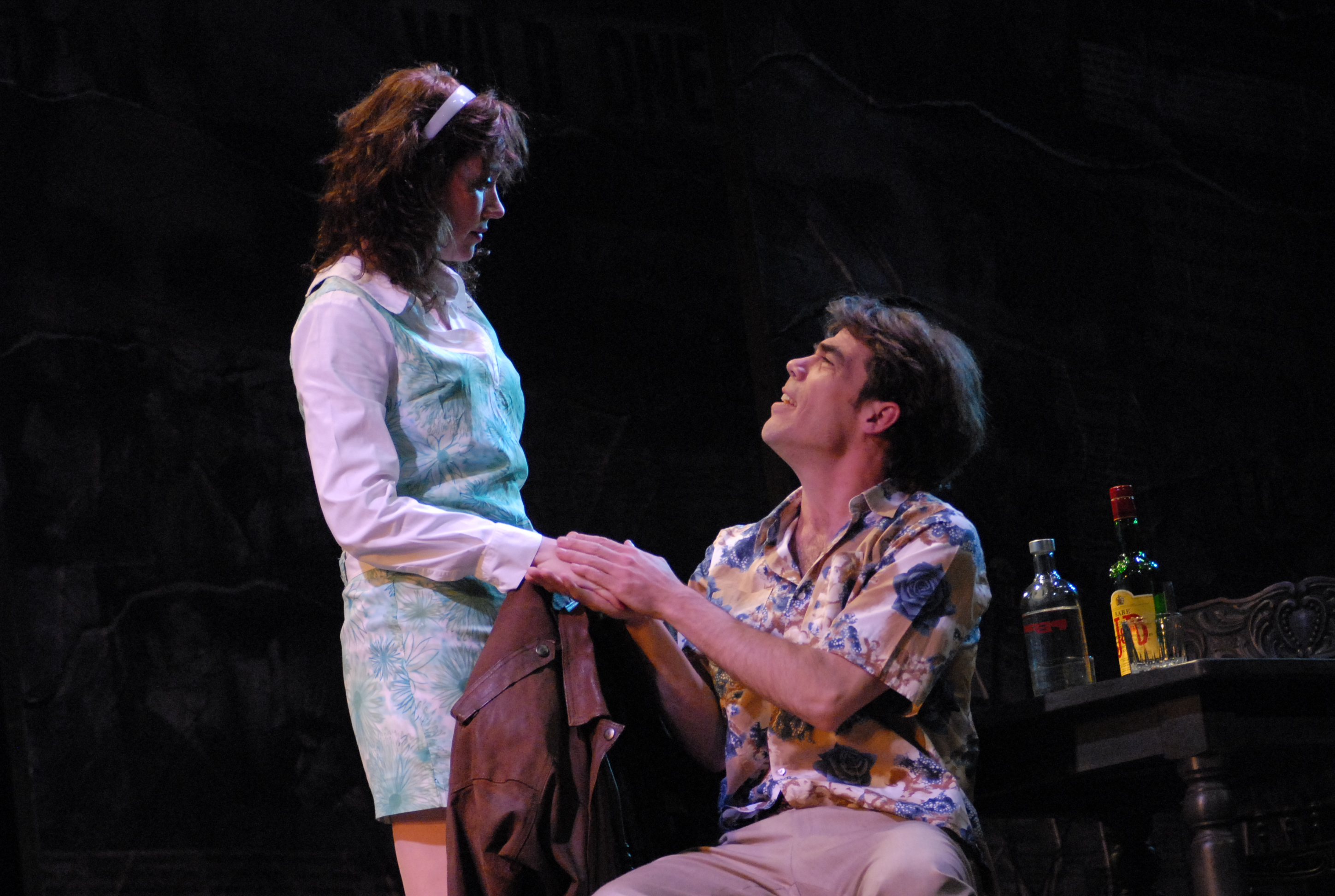
Escobar acting on stage next to Javiera Contador at Teatro UC

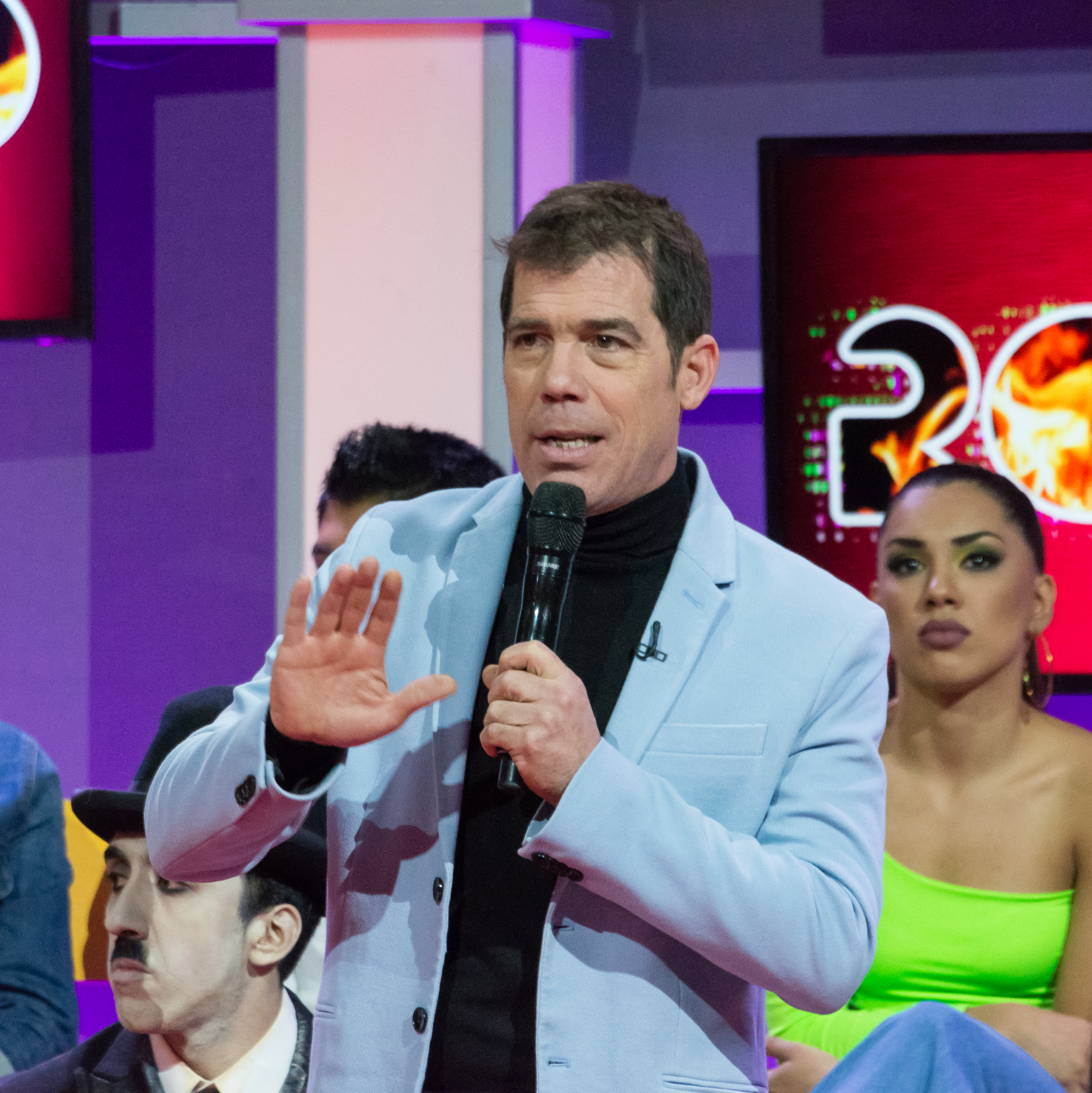
Álvaro Escobar as TV presenter of the show Rojo in 2019

In 1992, while combining his theater studies with the professional practice of Law at the San Antonio Judicial Assistance Corporation, he was called to release the drama area of Televisión Nacional de Chile for his second semester productions under the direction of María Eugenia Rencoret.

Between 1992 and 1996, he developed a career that focused around on-camera acting, taking part in productions such as Fácil de amar, Ámame, Champaña, Rojo y miel, Juegos de fuego y Loca piel.

In 1997, with the aim of contributing to the diversification of fiction formats on Chilean television, he decided to move away from soap operas and join Luis Alarcón, Patricia Rivadeneira and director Joaquín Eyzaguirre in the first independently produced Chilean police series: Brigada Escorpión.

At this time, Álvaro Escobar decided to expand his professional record, intensifying his work as a conductor on Radio Concierto (1995–1998); debuting on stage with the Grupo Panico work Fando y Lis (1998); venturing into music through his responsibility for percussion, acoustic guitar, lyrics and melodic lines for the work of the Yunke group (1998–2001); initiating the making of the documentary The memory of music (1998–2004); and sharing honors with Álvaro Rudolphy, Maribel Verdú and Carmen Maura in the film Ricardo Larraín's Enthusiasm (1998).

In 1998, Álvaro Escobar conducted the coverage of Televisión Nacional de Chile for the concert that the Irish group U2 offered on February 11 at the National Stadium. In May he did the same for Vía X with the conduction of the Metallica concert in Chile. In June, he traveled with El Enthusiasm to the Cannes Film Festival and returned to Chile to rejoin the dramatic area of TVN and combine his performance in the television series Aquelarre, his work with Yunke (his musical band), and the host of the Rocket program for Vía X (1997–2000).

In 2000 he signed with Channel 13, starting the year as an international jury for the Viña del Mar International Song Festival and acting in the productions Sabor a ti (2000) and Piel canela (2001). This earned him a nomination from the Association of Show Journalists for best supporting actor.

From 2001 to 2005, Escobar's career was marked by his work on radios' Zero (2001) and at the University of Chile (2002); his debut as a director of microdocumentaries for the TVN program Día a día (2002); conducting the Latin Grammy Awards for TVN (2002); a prosperous "commission of service" in the TVN program Rojo (2003); conducting the Valparaíso Cultural Carnivals (2002 and 2003); conducting the galas in the program Operación Triunfo de Mega (2003) and conducting the program Beyond the horizon on Radio Horizonte (2003–2004).

Until September 2005, Álvaro Escobar managed to successfully combine his work in the morning programming of Radio Cooperativa (2004–2005), the post-production of the documentary The memory of music, the production of Autopsy for Mega (2004–2005), the realization and conducting the program Trafficking influences for UCV TV (2004–2005); acting work in television series such as Justicia para todos (2003–2004), Tiempo final (2004) or Urgencias (2005); and his performance in plays such as Three versions of life (2004) and Breaking codes, for which he is nominated for the Altazor and APES Awards (2005).

In May 2006, he received the APES Award for Best Theater Actor. By that time, Álvaro Escobar was already playing the most important role in his life: that of deputy of the Republic.

In 2011, he returned to television in the series Tempano, in addition to starring in the first Chilean television series of 3 pm, Esperanza, both on TVN.

== Political career ==
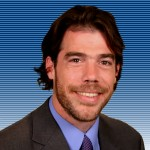
Escobar as deputy in 2006

In 2005, he responded to Michelle Bachelet's call to participate in that year's parliamentary elections as a candidate for the 20th district of Estación Central, Cerrillos and Maipú. He won a seat with the first relative majority: 42%.

Since March 11, 2006, his work in the Chamber of Deputies included an extensive legislative agenda; the creation of a Permanent Commission on Culture and the Arts; a productive job on the Housing Commission; the creation of a Special Commission on Freedom of Expression; his contribution to the legislative work of the Committee on the Environment; the creation of a Political Regime Commission; and social work for the 20th district.

At this time, Álvaro Escobar conceived his performances at the Teatro de la Universidad Católica (Traición; 2007) and at the Teatro ICTUS Theater (Visiting Mr. Green; 2007–2008) as a way to enrich social work for the 20th district, making cultural works available to the residents of Estación Central, Cerrillos and Maipú.

In August 2006, he resigned from his political community when the parliamentarians on his bench rejected the proposals of the "Boeninger Commission" to change to the binomial electoral system. From that date until the end of the legislative period, Álvaro Escobar remained as an independent deputy related to Michelle Bachelet. In this capacity, on January 15, 2009, Álvaro Escobar proposed the socialist deputy Marco Enríquez-Ominami as the presidential candidate of the Concertación for the presidential elections in December of that same year. However, the reluctance of the government coalition to include Enríquez-Ominami in the internal competition for selecting the presidential candidate of the sector led Álvaro Escobar and Marco Enríquez-Ominami to insist on the race for the presidency of Chile, aside from his historical militancy in the Concertación de Partidos por la Democracia.

For his part, his quality as a central figure in support of the Enríquez-Ominami candidacy forced Álvaro Escobar to register as a candidate to run as a deputy and strengthen the presidential campaign in the largest district of Chile. On December 13, the day of the voting, the deputy obtained the second majority of votes, but the current binomial electoral system made him lose in favor of Pepe Auth, a candidate who obtained third place and with whom he had had a bitter dispute days before, being at that time Pepe Auth the President of the Party for Democracy.

== Filmography ==
=== Telenovelas ===
| Year | Title | character | Channel |
|---|---|---|---|
| 1992 | Fácil de amar | Ernesto Alberti | Canal 13 |
| 1993 | Ámame | Pablo De Bantes | TVN |
| 1994 | Champaña | Rodolfo Jurandir | Canal 13 |
| 1994 | Rojo y miel | Felipe Bernhardt | TVN |
| 1995 | Juegos de fuego | Gabriel Pereira | TVN |
| 1996 | Loca piel | Martín Page | TVN |
| 1999 | Aquelarre | Diego Guerra | TVN |
| 2000 | Sabor a ti | Tomás Sarmiento | Canal 13 |
| 2001 | Piel canela | Robinson | Canal 13 |
| 2011 | Témpano | Marcos Fuentealba | TVN |
| 2011 | Esperanza | Juan Pablo Marticorena | TVN |

=== TV Series ===
| Year | Title | Character | Channel |
|---|---|---|---|
| 1997 | Brigada Escorpión | Ignacio Lobos | TVN |
| 2002 | La vida es una lotería | Martín Bianchi | TVN |
| 2004–2006 | JPT: Justicia Para Todos | Esteban Pérez | TVN |
| 2005 | Tiempo final: en tiempo real | Roberto | TVN |
| 2012 | El diario secreto de una profesional | Manuel Ibáñez | TVN |
| 2013 | Bim Bam Bum | Marcial Vergara | TVN |
| 2015 | Familia moderna | Juan Pablo Letelier | Mega |

=== TV Presenter ===
| Year | Title | Role | Channel |
|---|---|---|---|
| 1997–2000 | Rocket | Conductor | Vía X |
| 2002 | Día a día | Conductor | TVN |
| 2002 | Premios Grammy Latino | Conductor | TVN |
| 2002 | Rojo fama contrafama | Conductor | TVN |
| 2003 | Operación Triunfo | Conductor | Mega |
| 2004–2013 | Tráfico de influencias | Conductor | UCV TV |
| 2011 | El experimento | Juez | TVN |
| 2012 | Divididos | Conductor | TVN |
| 2012 | Memorias del Rock Chileno | Conductor | Canal 13 |
| 2013–2017 | Más vale tarde | Conductor | Mega |
| 2018 | Grandes Pillos | Conductor | CHV |
| 2018–2019 | Rojo, el color del talento | Conductor | TVN |
| 2020 | Olmué Festival | Conductor | TVN |
