= Silvio Caiozzi =

Chilean film director and cinematographer

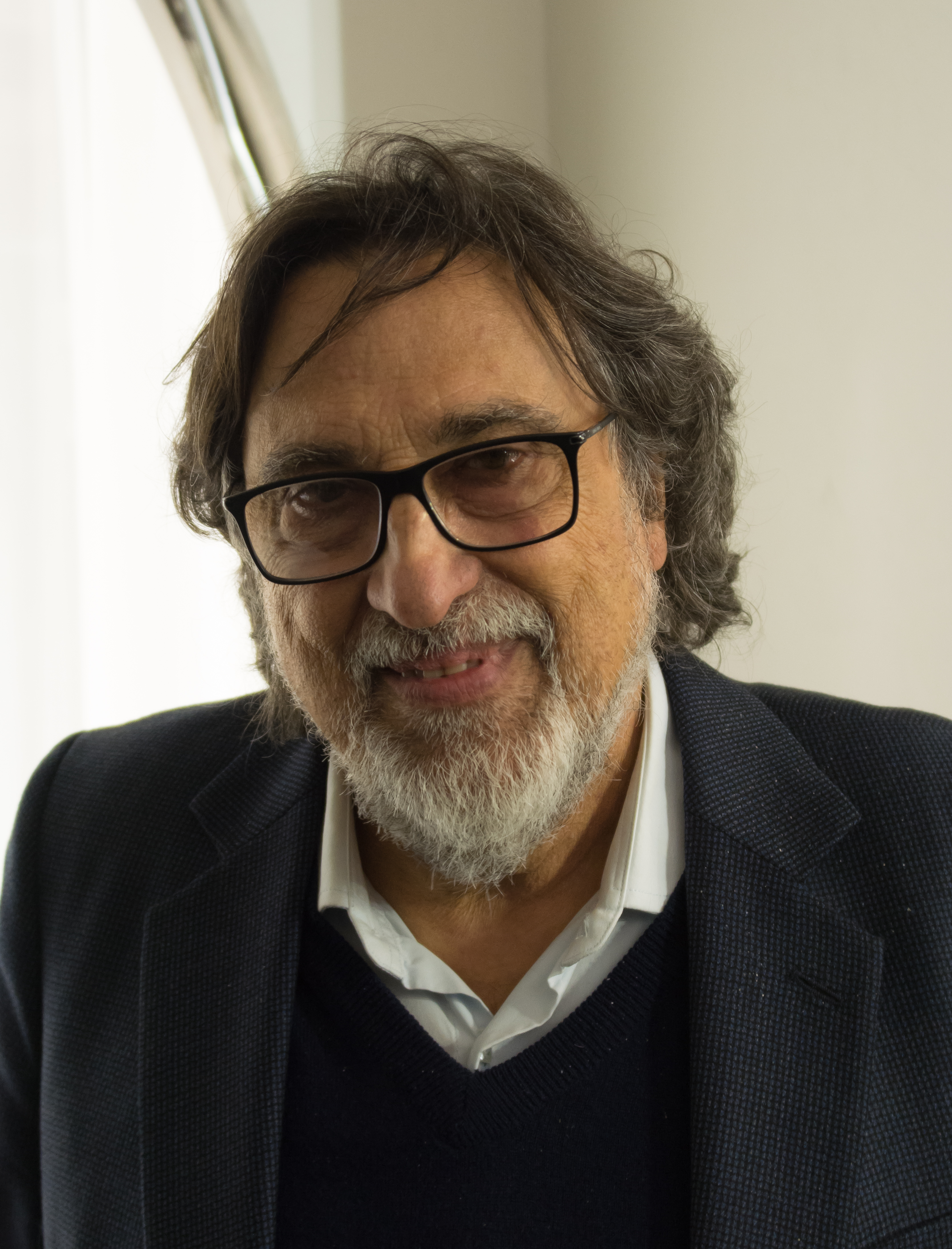
- Born: Santiago de Chile
- Occupation: Film director

Silvio Caiozzi (born 1944) is a Chilean film director and cinematographer.

== Select filmography ==
- In the Shadow of the Sun (A la sombra del sol) - 1974
- Julio Begins in July (Julio comienza en julio) - 1979
- Historia de un roble solo - 1982
- The Moon in the Mirror (La luna en el espejo) - 1990
- Fernando ha vuelto - 1998
- Coronation (Coronación) - 2000
- Chile, un encuentro cercano - 2001
- Cachimba - 2004
- And Suddenly the Dawn (Y de pronto el amanecer) - 2017

== Awards ==
Grand Prix des Amériques for Y de pronto el amanecer (And suddenly the dawn), 2017
