= B'nai B'rith Latin America =

Jewish social service organization

B'nai B'rith Latin America was founded in the early 20th Century as a regional division of B'nai B'rith International, a Jewish social service organization. It has been active in Latin America throughout the 20th Century and to the present day.

== Background ==
During the early 20th Century, B'nai B'rith lodges were established across Latin America. In 1959, representatives from international B'nai B'rith divisions established a new organizational body known as the "B'nai B'rith International Committee" and included representatives from B'nai B'rith Latin America and was later instrumental in updating the international organization on antisemitism in Latin America and the state of military dictatorships. The Latin American division participated in displaying a 1966 international exhibition on the contributions of Sigmund Freud in the hopes of combatting prejudice.

=== Argentina ===
B'nai B'rith in Argentina began in Buenos Aires in 1930. By the 1960s, the organization had also established itself in the cities of Mendoza, San Lorenzo, and Córdoba.

=== Brazil ===
B'nai B'rith in Brazil was founded in 1932 and was temporarily banned by the country's Estado Novo dictatorship that lasted from 1937 to 1945 before resuming its activities.

=== Chile ===
B'nai B'rith in Chile was established in 1937 initially with the assistance of B'nai B'rith members in Argentina.

=== Cuba ===
B'nai B'rith in Cuba was founded in 1943. After the Cuban revolution, the organisation's activities were mostly curtailed although it was never formally disbanded.

=== Guatemala ===
In Guatemala, the B'nai B'rith facilitated relief aid in the aftermath of the 1976 Guatemala earthquake.

=== Mexico ===
B'nai B'rith in Mexico was active since the early 20th Century and encouraged Jews in Eastern Europe to immigrate to Mexico. During the 1920s, it employed the scholar, Anita Brenner, as a correspondent to assist their efforts to protect immigrant Jewish girls from white slavery following reports of local abductions. In the 1960s, B'nai B'rith began reporting on the prevalence of antisemitic literature in Mexico's bookstores to international B'nai B'rith divisions.

=== Panama ===
B'nai B'rith in Panama was active since the early 20th Century and helped Jews arriving from Eastern Europe, Caribbean and the Middle East who emigrated to Panama. B'nai B'rith of Panama was one of the major Jewish organization to found the community's Consejo Central Comunitario Hebreo de Panama. Today runs the YOUTH LEADERSHIP PROGRAM, ANTI DEFAMATION COMMITTEE, STARS OF DAVID PROGRAM and the GOOD DEEDS DAY.

=== Uruguay ===
B'nai B'rith in Uruguay was founded in 1936, and later reported to the international B'nai B'rith concerning the 1970s military regime. The regional B'nai B'rith issued reports on the Uruguayan "death patrols" during the country's military regime, and the decline of Nicaragua's Jewish community.

=== Venezuela ===
In 1966, B'nai B'rith of Venezuela was one of the five major Jewish organization to found the community's Confederation of Jewish Associations of Venezuela (CAIV) and became a supporter of adult Jewish education programs.

== See also ==
- History of the Jews in Latin America
