= In the Grayscale =

- Theatrical release poster
- En la Gama de los Grises
- Directed by: Claudio Marcone
- Written by: Rodrigo Antonio Norero
- Produced by: Luis Cifuentes
- Starring: Francisco Celhay; Emilio Edwards; Sergio Hernández; Daniela Ramirez; Matias Torres
- Cinematography: Andrés Jordán
- Edited by: Felipe Gálvez Haberle
- Music by: Dario Segui
- Production companies: Tantan Films; Lucho Film
- Release date: 7 March 2015 (Miami)
- Running time: 101 minutes
- Country: Chile
- Language: Spanish

In the Grayscale (Spanish: En la Gama de los Grises) is a 2015 Chilean drama film directed by Claudio Marcone and written by Rodrigo Antonio Norero.

The film stars Francisco Celhay as Bruno, an architect separated from his wife Soledad (Daniela Ramírez), who begins to explore his unresolved bisexuality when a new project to design a public monument in Santiago brings him into contact with Fer (Emilio Edwards), an out gay travel guide to whom he feels a strong attraction.

The film, the directorial debut of Claudio Marcone, won the Ibero-American Opera Prima Award at the Miami International Film Festival, and it was named Best First Feature at the Frameline Film Festival.

== Plot ==
Bruno (Celhay) is a 35-year-old architect who leads a seemingly perfect life. He resides in a beautiful house with his wife and child and also owns a thriving architecture office. However, despite his comfortable lifestyle, he experiences a profound sense of unease. As a result, he decides to leave everything behind and move out to live alone, coincidentally when a businessman approaches him to design an icon for the city of Santiago. With newfound motivation, he embarks on a quest to search for heritage traces, accompanied by Fer (Emilio Edwards), a 29-year-old, energetic, and captivating gay history professor.

== See also ==
- List of lesbian, gay, bisexual or transgender-related films of 2015
