= Shmuel Szteinhendler =

Chief Rabbi of Cuba

Shmuel Szteinhendler, a rabbi in Santiago, Chile, is considered the current Chief Rabbi of Cuba and one of the most notable Rabbis in Latin America.

Szteinhendler was born in Argentina and trained as a Conservative rabbi in Buenos Aires. He started visiting Cuba regularly since 1992, operating from his base in Guadalajara, Mexico, and oversaw a revival of the Jewish culture there, serving as an informal spiritual head of the Jewish community in Cuba. Szteinhendler's visits to Cuba were sponsored by the American Jewish Joint Distribution Committee.
