= Julio Begins in July =

1979 Chilean film

- Chilean theatrical poster
- Spanish: Julio comienza en Julio
- Directed by: Silvio Caiozzi
- Starring: Juan Cristóbal Meza
- Cinematography: Nelson Fuentes
- Music by: Luis Advis
- Release date: 1979
- Running time: 120 minutes
- Country: Chile
- Language: Spanish

Julio Begins in July (Spanish: Julio comienza en julio) is a 1979 Chilean coming-of-age period film directed by Silvio Caiozzi and written by Gustavo Frías. It is one of the few Chilean feature films made and released in the first decade of the Pinochet dictatorship.

The film won the Golden Columbus Award at the 1979 Huelva Ibero-American Film Festival and the Chilean Critics' Circle Award for Best Film. In 1999, it was voted as the "best Chilean film of the 20th century" by the public in a poll organized by the Municipality of Santiago.

Critics regard it as one of the finest films in Chilean cinema, alongside Miguel Littín's The Jackal of Nahueltoro, Raúl Ruiz's Three Sad Tigers, Patricio Guzmán's The Battle of Chile, and Andrés Wood's Machuca.

== Plot ==
Don Julio García del Castaño is a wealthy landowner who must secure the future of his estate. To do so, he must train his son and heir, Julio (affectionately called Julito), in the necessary skills to become a man.

== Production ==
The film was shot in Pirque and Calera de Tango (with the curious coincidence that filming began in July 1976). Due to a severely limited budget, actors and crew members received only minimal compensation for their participation. It was shot in 16 mm black and white format and later transferred to 35 mm and sepia format in laboratories located in the United States.

== Cast ==
- Juan Cristóbal Meza
- Felipe Rabat
- Schlomit Baytelman
- Gloria Münchmeyer
- Jaime Vadell
- Luis Alarcón
- Ana González Olea
- Delfina Guzmán
- Tennyson Ferrada

== Reception ==
At its premiere, the film not only received widespread critical and popular acclaim, but also won the Golden Columbus for Best Film at the Huelva Ibero-American Film Festival and was screened at the prestigious Directors' Fortnight at the Cannes Film Festival.

Julio comienza en julio already exhibits several traits that would establish Silvio Caiozzi as one of the most important Chilean film directors, including a strong sense of mise-en-scène, remarkable skill in directing actors, and a keen ability to convey political messages about the country through implicit means. In 1999, Julio comienza en julio was voted the "best Chilean film of the 20th century" in a popular poll organized by the Municipality of Santiago.
