= 100 días para enamorarse =

100 días para enamorarse may refer to:

- 100 días para enamorarse (Argentine TV series), a 2018 telenovela
- 100 días para enamorarse (Chilean TV series), a 2019 telenovela based on the Argentine telenovela
- 100 días para enamorarnos, a 2020 American telenovela, based on the Argentine production
