= Nelly Meruane =

Chilean actress and teacher (1927–2018)

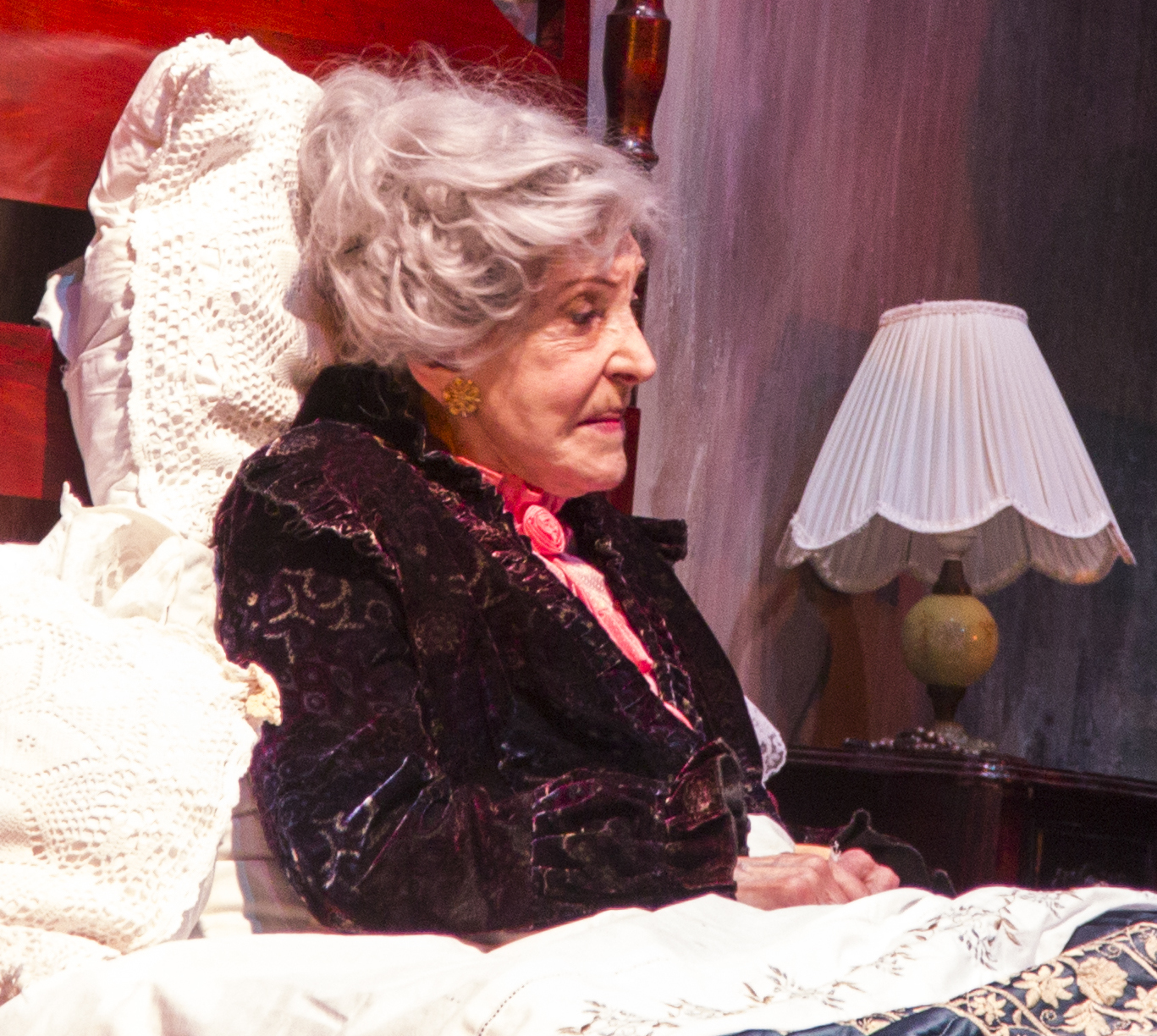
- Nelly Meruane in the play Coronación in 2013
- Born: Nelly Lucinda Consuelo Meruane Solano; 20 December 1927; Nueva Toltén, Chile
- Died: 20 June 2018 (aged 90); Santiago, Chile
- Education: University of Chile
- Occupations: Actress, teacher
- Years active: 1952–2018
- Spouse: Juan Carlos Bistoto (1969–2018)
- Family: Ricardo Meruane (nephew); Lina Meruane (great-niece)
- Awards: APES Award (2011); Altazor Award (2014)

Nelly Lucinda Consuelo Meruane Solano (20 December 1927 – 20 June 2018) was a distinguished Chilean actress and teacher whose career spanned 65 years. For 20 years she was a member of the stable cast of the Teatro Ensayo of the Pontifical Catholic University of Chile.

Meruane was recognized for her leading roles in the television series Juani en sociedad (1967), the telenovela La madrastra (1981), and the play Mama Rosa (1982). She received several honors, such as an APES Award in 2011 and an Altazor in 2014.

== Biography ==
Nelly Meruane was born in Nueva Toltén on 20 December 1927. She showed a strong interest in the performing arts from a very young age. Due to strong opposition from her parents, she studied pedagogy in Spanish, but also took theater classes in parallel. When beginning her studies at the University of Chile's Pedagogical Institute, she also entered the school's Dramatic Arts Center (CADIP), joining the cast of several plays under the stage name Sonia del Solar. Later, she majored in theater at the Catholic University. She debuted in the play Time and the Conways at the Municipal Theatre of Santiago in 1952 as a first-year student of the Theater Academy.

In 1960 she starred in La pérgola de las flores by Isidora Aguirre, where she replaced actress Ana González in the role of Rosaura. In the following years, she popularized the role of La Cotocó in the TV series Juani en sociedad, starring alongside Silvia Piñeiro. She met actor Juan Carlos Bistoto when he appeared on the show in 1969, and married him 45 days later.

She subsequently traveled to Venezuela with Bistoto, achieving a distinguished career in theater and television there. In 1977 she starred in the film El Pez que Fuma, directed by the playwright Román Chalbaud. She returned to Chile in 1981, and played Dora in Arturo Moya Grau's successful telenovela La madrastra. In 1982 she starred in Mama Rosa by Fernando Debesa, a performance which was lauded as one of her best. She continued to appear in films and television, with her last acting role being Señora Felman on the telenovela Chipe libre in 2014. In 2016 she was featured in the documentary Viejos amores, along with six other veteran actresses.

Nelly Meruane died in Santiago on 20 June 2018, nine days after her contemporary and frequent co-star Liliana Ross.

In November 2018 she received a posthumous career tribute from the Actors Guild of Chile.

== Works ==
=== Films ===
- El cuerpo y la sangre by R. Sánchez (1962)
- Angelito by L. Cornejo (1965)
- El Pez que Fuma by Román Chalbaud (1977)
- Fuga by Pablo Larraín (2006)
- Viejos amores (2016)

=== Telenovelas ===
| Year | Title | Character | Channel |
|---|---|---|---|
| 1981 | La madrastra | Dora San Lucas | Canal 13 |
| 1982 | Una familia feliz | Marisa Altamira | Canal 13 |
| 1982 | Alguien por quien vivir | Ester Elizalde | Canal 13 |
| 1983 | Las herederas | Kiki Zelada | Canal 13 |
| 1985 | Matrimonio de papel | Natalia López | Canal 13 |
| 1986 | Ángel malo | Marilú Alemparte | Canal 13 |
| 1987 | La invitación | Julieta Vantini | Canal 13 |
| 1988 | Matilde dedos verdes | Ema Riquelme | Canal 13 |
| 1988 | Semidiós | Elsa Santana | Canal 13 |
| 1989 | Bravo | Eugenia | Canal 13 |
| 1990 | ¿Te conté? | Hilda Mardones | Canal 13 |
| 1991 | Villa Nápoli | Úrsula | Canal 13 |
| 1992 | Fácil de amar | Berta | Canal 13 |
| 1993 | Marrón Glacé | Aída | Canal 13 |
| 1994 | Champaña | Inés Molina | Canal 13 |
| 1994 | Top secret | | Canal 13 |
| 1996 | Marrón Glacé, el regreso | Aída | Canal 13 |
| 1997 | Playa salvaje | Silvia O'Reilly | Canal 13 |
| 1999 | Fuera de control | Lavinia Loyola | Canal 13 |
| 2001 | Corazón pirata | Flora Salas | Canal 13 |
| 2001 | Piel canela | América | Canal 13 |
| 2003 | Machos | Mirna Robles | Canal 13 |
| 2004 | Hippie | Blanca Donoso | Canal 13 |
| 2008 | Mala Conducta | Rosa Bobadilla | Chilevisión |
| 2014 | Chipe libre | Señora Felman | Canal 13 |

=== TV series and specials ===
| Year | Title | Character | Channel |
|---|---|---|---|
| 1967–1972 | Juani en sociedad | Cotocó Pereira | Canal 13 |
| 2002–2006 | La vida es una lotería | Margarita/Milena | TVN |
| 2004 | El cuento del tío | Professor | TVN |
| 2004 | Xfea2 | Lídia | Mega |
| 2005–2006 | La Nany | Yaya Cárdenas | Mega |
| 2006 | Tiempo final: en tiempo real | Vecina | TVN |
| 2007 | Vecinos al 3 y al 4 | Sra. Elena | Canal 13 |
| 2007–2010 | Teatro en Chilevisión | Various | Chilevisión |
| 2008 | Casado con hijos | Josefina de Larraín | Mega |
| 2009 | Aquí no hay quien viva | Nora Cifuentes | Chilevisión |
| 2014 | Familia moderna | Antonia's grandmother | Mega |

=== Plays ===
- Time and the Conways by J. B. Priestley
- When We Are Married by J. B. Priestley
- Martín Rivas by S. del Campo
- La casa de la noche by T. Maulnier
- The Maidens' Consent by Leandro Fernández de Moratín
- Las santas mujeres by G. Roepke
- Navidad en el circo by H. Gheon
- The Imaginary Invalid by Molière
- Los culpables by G. Roepke
- The Matchmaker by Thornton Wilder
- The Madwoman of Chaillot by Jean Giraudoux
- Juana de Lorena by M. Anderson
- Pueblecito by A. Moock
- Un hombre de Dios by G. Marcel
- Entre gallos y medianoche by Carlos Cariola
- Esta señorita Trini by L. Heiremans and C. Barros
- Juegos silenciosos by G. Roepke
- Look Homeward, Angel by Thomas Wolfe
- Los güenos versos by L. Heiremans
- Diálogos de Carmelitas by Georges Bernanos
- La pérgola de las flores by I. Aguirre and P. Flores
- La moratoria by Jorge Andrade
- Versos de ciego by L. Heiremans
- Locos de verano by G. Laferrere
- El Tony Chico by L. Heiremans
- Árbol viejo by Acevedo Hernández
- Juani en sociedad by William Douglas Home
- Le Médecin malgré lui by Molière
- Como en la gran ciudad by H. Letelier and P. Flores
- Duck in Orange Sauce by William Douglas Home
- Filumena Marturano by Eduardo De Filippo
- Mama Rosa by Fernando Debesa
- Ah, Wilderness! by Eugene O'Neill
- Comedia a la antigua by N. Arbuzov
- Viejas by C. Ortega (1995)
- The Servant of Two Masters by Carlo Goldoni
- Los verdes campos del Edén by Antonio Gala
- Asia y el Lejano Oriente by Isaac Chocrón
- Entertaining Mr Sloane by Joe Orton
- The Balcony by Jean Genet
- La luminosa herida en el tiempo by Jorge Díaz (2000)
- A pedir de boca by Jorge Díaz (2004)
- La reencarnación de la Chimba, theatrical adaptation of The Obscene Bird of Night by José Donoso
- Coronación by José Donoso (2014)

=== Opera ===
- La fille du régiment by Gaetano Donizetti, Duchess of Krakenthorp, 1990

== Awards ==
- Municipal Performing Arts Award of Santiago, 2006
- APES Career Award, 2011
- University of Chile Fearab Award for Distinguished Professional Career, 2012
- Altazor Award for Best Actress in Coronación, 2014
- Distinguished Public Personality from the Municipality of Providencia, 2017
