= Alejandra Herrera =

Alejandra Herrera may refer to:

- Alejandra Herrera (actress), Chilean actress
- Alejandra Herrera (footballer), Salvadoran footballer
