= Valentina Pollarolo =

Chilean actress and screenwriter

- Born: Valentina Pollarolo Guiraldes; February 20, 1971 (age 54); Santiago, Chile
- Occupation(s): Actor, screenwriter
- Years active: 1990–present

Valentina Pollarolo Guiraldes (Santiago, February 20, 1971) is a Chilean actress and screenwriter. She was a regular face on Chilean telenovelas of the '90s. Her most popular character was Paola Cárcamo in the TV series Playa Salvaje and its spin-off show Los Cárcamo.

== Biography ==
In 1990, shortly after leaving school and while she was in her first year of Art, she appeared on the TV series Acércate más as Catalina Guerra's younger sister. Since then, she was a regular face of the dramatic productions of the decade like Estúpido Cupido and Sucupira on TVN. In 1997, she emigrated to Channel 13 where she participated in productions such as Playa salvaje, Marparaíso and Cerro Alegre.

Her role as Paola Cárcamo in Playa Salvaje was very popular as the rest of her fictional family were. This led to a family-based sitcom, Los Cárcamo, which ran for two seasons in 1998 and 1999. Due to the success, TVN, Channel 13's main rival, acquired the series to broadcast on its international signal. On her part, Pollarolo was even invited, characterized as Paola Cárcamo to the prime TV show of the time, Viva el Lunes, in a chapter where the then number one tennis player Marcelo Ríos also appeared.

In 2001, she gave him a break from the small screen to make her debut in theater with Tres noches de un sábado, under the direction of Andrés Céspedes. The following year she was in the production of the telenovela Buen partido, which meant her withdrawal from the TV genre.

After living in the Czech Republic with her husband, she returned to the country and dedicates herself to voice overs: she was the host of Radio Activa and the institutional voice of La Red. In 2012 she reappeared on television as the protagonist of a unique Vía X fiction called Pic nic.

In recent times she began to exploit her side as a screenwriter. In 2015 she participated by writing Preciosas on Channel 13, but she was raised by TVN to join the team of Un diablo con ángel. In addition, she is the author of a play called Juan, an imaginary story that was presented at Centro Mori.

== Filmography ==
=== Telenovelas ===
Telenovelas
Years	Telenovela	Role	Channel
1990	Acércate más	Anita	Canal 13
1993	Ámame	Constanza Castellot	TVN
1994	Rompecorazón	Bárbara	TVN
1995	Estúpido Cupido	Pamela Manterola	TVN
1996	Sucupira	Rocío Ureta	TVN
1997	Playa Salvaje	Paola Cárcamo / Verónica Gibson	Canal 13
1998	Marparaíso	Roxana Campos	Canal 13
1999	Cerro Alegre	Fernanda García	Canal 13
2001	Corazón Pirata	Lorna Sánchez	Canal 13
2002	Buen Partido	Marisol Carmona	Canal 13
2004	Quiero	Claudia Inostroza	Canal 13
2017	Un diablo con ángel	Sara Briceño	TVN

=== TV Series ===
Series
Year	Teleserie	Role	Channel
1989	Teresa de los Andes	Luisa Vial	TVN
1996	Los Venegas		TVN
1995	Juani en sociedad	Juana Ariztía Möller	Canal 13
1998	Teatro en Canal 13	María Pia	Canal 13
1998–1999	Los Cárcamo	Paola Cárcamo	Canal 13
2005	Heredia & Asociados	Sofía	TVN
2005	El día menos pensado	Adriana	TVN
2005	La Nany	Liliana	Mega
2012	Pic Nic	Amanda Ericson	Vía X

=== Scripts ===
- Juegos de poder (2019) – Original of Luis Ponce
- Dime quién fue (2018) – Original of Marcelo Castañón
- Un diablo con ángel (2017) – Original of Marcelo Castañón
- Preciosas (2016) – Original of Catalina Calcagni
