= Alex Zisis =

Chilean actor

- Born: Alejandro Isaac Zisis Drinberg; August 3, 1950 (age 76); Santiago de Chile
- Education: University of Chile
- Occupation: Actor
- Children: 3

Alejandro Isaac Zisis Drinberg (Santiago, Chile, August 3, 1950) better known as Alex Zisis, is a Chilean actor of theater, film and television.

== Biography ==
While studying Business Engineering at the University of Chile, he joined the Teatro Aleph Group, directed by Óscar Castro Ramírez. After participating in several productions, he distinguished himself among its members.

After the coup d'état of September 11, 1973, the group continued to perform, but several of its members were persecuted and forced to flee. Óscar Castro was arrested and fled to France, where he re-established the group, which remains active today. Another member, John McLeod, is among the disappeared. Alex Zisis fled to Argentina, where he remained for several years.

Upon returning to Chile, he joined several television casts. Among his first roles were the educational program Teleduc on Canal 13 and the telenovelas Alguien por quien vivir (1982) and Los títeres (1984), both on Canal 13. He continued with an extensive television career, where he stood out in his most memorable performances such as Champaña (1994), Eclipse de Luna, Playa Salvaje (1997), Sabor a ti (2000), Corazón Rebelde (2009), among others.

In 1987, he participated in the Canal 13 comedy project De chincol a jote, alongside Cristián García-Huidobro, Coca Guazzini, Gonzalo Robles, Malucha Pinto, and other actors.

In 1989, he acted in the film Consuelo by Luis R. Vera, a Swedish-Chilean co-production about exile and return. At the same time, he was working on the sitcom Contigo pan y caviar, written by Sergio Bravo and broadcast on Chilevisión.

His first leading role was in Carlos - Carola (1993) on TVN, a nighttime sitcom.

Alex has also distinguished in several telenovelas and comedy programs, such as Jaguar yu and Teatro on Chilevisión. He also starred in the Megavisión sitcom La Nany, (with Alejandra Herrera) which aired between 2005 and March 2006.

He also participated in the Pontifical Catholic University of Chile's educational project, Teleduc, in the Natural Sciences Laboratory course, where he played "Equis," a curious scientist who interacted with a box (played by Sandra Solimano). When Equis was surprised by something, the box explained the phenomenon through an experiment.

In 2017, the actor ran as deputy for Congress in District 8 (Maipú, Estación Central, Cerrillos, Quilicura, Lampa, Tiltil, Pudahuel, and Colina). He was not elected.

== Filmography ==
=== Films ===
Films
Year	Title	Role	Director
1989	Consuelo	Alfredo	Luis R. Vera
1998	El hombre que imaginaba	Ulises	Claudio Sapiain
2000	Mi famosa desconocida	Alberto Lecaros	Edgardo Viereck
2005	The bathroom		Gregory Cohen
2007	Fiestapatria	César	Luis R. Vera
2008	Juan Mandinga		Nicolás Labra
2009	Extranjero	Hernán	Cristian Quinzacara
2013	El derechazo	Pablo Corteira	Lalo Prieto

=== Telenovelas ===
Year	Telenovel	Role	Channel
1982	Alguien por quien vivir	Eduardo	Canal 13
1983	El juego de la vida	Joaquín	TVN
1983	La represa	Gerardo Pérez	TVN
1984	Los títeres	Aníbal	Canal 13
1984	Andrea	Felipe	Canal 13
1985	La trampa	Samuel	Canal 13
1985	La dama del balcón	Pablo San Ramón	TVN
1986	La villa	Saulo Bernier / Carlos Bernier	TVN
1987	Mi nombre es Lara	Federico Dieguez	TVN
1989	A la sombra del ángel	Daniel Inchauspe	TVN
1989	La intrusa	Eloy Tropero	Canal 13
1990	Acércate más	Sergio Costabal	Canal 13
1991	Ellas por ellas	Gerardo	Canal 13
1992	Trampas y Caretas	Clemente Correa	TVN
1994	Champaña	Alfonso Cox	Canal 13
1995	El amor está de moda	Hernán Mujica	Canal 13
1997	Eclipse de luna	Vladimir Ilich	Canal 13
1997	Playa salvaje	Adolfo Ossandón	Canal 13
1998	A todo dar	Sergio Balboa	Mega
1999	Algo está cambiando	Ricardo Steinlein	Mega
2000	Sabor a ti	Javier Ugarte	Canal 13
2001	Amores de mercado	Javier	TVN
2004	Tentación	Guillermo García	Canal 13
2009	Corazón rebelde	Marcelo Ortúzar	Canal 13
2010	Feroz	Gonzalo Tagle	Canal 13
2010	Primera dama	Enrique Salgado	Canal 13
2012	Reserva de familia	Diego Calvo	TVN
2013	Soltera otra vez 2	Sebastián	Canal 13
2014	Mamá mechona	René	Canal 13

=== Series and unitaries ===
- Martín Rivas (TVN, 1979) - Criado de Pedro San Luis
- Anakena (Canal 13, 1982) - Matías Ananí
- De chincol a jote (Canal 13, 1987-1993) - Varios personajes
- La Quintrala (TVN, 1987) como Juan Rudolfo Lisperguer.
- Contigo pan y caviar (Chilevisión, 1989)
- Carlos Carola (TVN, 1993) - Carlos / Carola
- El día menos pensado (TVN, 2001) como Jaime
- Más que amigos (Canal 13, 2002) como Javier Donoso.
- BKN (Mega, 2004) como Gonzalo Villanueva.
- Geografía del deseo (TVN, 2004) como Miguel
- Loco por ti (TVN, 2004) como Javier.
- Tiempo final: en tiempo real (TVN, 2005) como Nacho.
- Los Galindo (TVN, 2005) como Francisco Echeverría.
- La Nany (Mega, 2005) como Max Valdivieso.
- Los simuladores (Canal 13, 2005) como Víctor Soquin.
- 12 días que estremecieron a Chile (Chilevisión, 2011)
- La Canción de tu Vida (TVN, 2014) como Bruno.
- Sudamerican Rockers (Chilevisión, 2014) como Antonio.
- Código Rosa (Mega, 2015)
- Once comida (TVN, 2016) como Carlo
- La jauría (Prime Video, 2020-2022)
