= Como la vida misma =

Chilean telenovela

- Genre: Telenovela
- Created by: Marcelo Castañón; Valentina Pollarolo
- Directed by: Felipe Arratia Díaz
- Starring: Sigrid Alegría; Diego Muñoz
- Opening theme: "Hasta viejitos" by Alex González and Carlos Vives
- Country of origin: Chile
- Original language: Spanish
- No. of seasons: 1
- No. of episodes: 286

Production
- Executive producers: Daniela Demicheli; Pablo Ávila
- Producer: Shigri Sánchez
- Editor: Nelson Valdés
- Camera setup: Multi-camera
- Production company: Mazal Producciones

Original release
- Network: Mega
- Release: May 9, 2023 – July 22, 2024

Como la vida misma (English title: As Life Goes On) is a Chilean telenovela created by Marcelo Castañón and Valentina Pollarolo. It aired on Mega from May 9, 2023 to July 22, 2024. It stars Sigrid Alegría and Diego Muñoz.

== Cast ==
- Sigrid Alegría as Soledad García
- Diego Muñoz as Alonso Valdés
- Andrés Velasco as Marco Morales
- Íngrid Cruz as Octavia Werner
- Coca Guazzini as Malú Ruiz-Tagle
- Héctor Noguera as Armando Morales
- Elisa Zulueta as Paula Sáez
- Claudio Castellón as Caco Covarrubias
- Claudia Pérez as Kathy López
- Rodrigo Muñoz as Memo Aguilera
- Sebastián Layseca as René García
- Teresita Reyes as Hilda Torres
- Max Salgado as Joselo Morales
- Octavia Bernasconi as Carol Morales
- Andrew Bargsted as Bruno Aguilera
- Amara Pedroso as Alice Turner
- Oliver Borner as Ignacio Hurtado
- Sol Parga as Pía Mendoza
- Bastián Hidalgo as Damián Morales
- Alexander Tobar as Benjamín Valdés
- Jacqueline Boudon as Jovita Salas
- Álvaro Espinoza as Clemente Domínguez

== Production ==
On February 4, 2023, Mega announced the title and cast members of the series. Filming began on February 7, 2023.

== Reception ==
=== Ratings ===
Season	Episodes	First aired		Last aired	
Season	Episodes	Date	Rating (in points)	Date	Rating (in points)
1	286	May 9, 2023	19.6	July 22, 2024	20.0

=== Awards and nominations ===
Year	Award	Category	Nominated	Result	Ref
2023	Produ Awards	Best Telenovela	Como la vida misma	Won	
2023	Produ Awards	Best Supporting Actress - Superseries or Telenovela	Íngrid Cruz	Nominated	
