= Chromosome 21 (TV series) =

Chilean crime thriller television series

- Spanish: Cromosoma 21
- Genre: Crime; Political drama
- Created by: Matías Venables; Nico Martínez Bergen
- Country of origin: Chile
- Original language: Chilean Spanish
- No. of seasons: 1
- No. of episodes: 8

Production
- Executive producers: Nico Martínez Bergen; Matías Venables; Erik Barmack
- Production location: Santiago
- Cinematography: Vicente Mayo
- Editor: Danielle Fillios
- Camera setup: Multiple-camera
- Running time: 40–45 minutes
- Production companies: Film & Maker; Wild Sheep Content

Original release
- Network: Canal 13
- Release: 14 October – 9 December 2022

Chromosome 21 (Spanish: Cromosoma 21) is a Chilean crime thriller television series co-created by Matías Venables and Nico Martínez Bergen. The series traces a police investigation into a young man with Down syndrome involved in a murder. It had its original run on Chilean network Canal 13 on 14 October 2022. Netflix then acquired global streaming rights, and released it on their platform on 8 February 2023. The series received four nominations at the 7th Caleuche Awards, with Sebastián Solorza winning the breakthrough actor award, and five nominations for the 10th Platino Awards.

== Cast ==
=== Main ===
- Sebastián Solorza as Tomás "Tomy" Ruiz: a young man with Down syndrome who becomes involved in a crime because of his brother
- Valentina Muhr as Mariana Enríquez: the commissioner of the homicide brigade of the Investigations Police of Chile (PDI)
- Mario Horton as Bruno Durán: the deputy commissioner of the homicide brigade
- Gastón Salgado as Guillermo "Bekam" Ruiz: Tomy's older brother
- Claudia di Girolamo as Sofía Lombardi: the director of the "Down Up Foundation" and Cristina's mother
- Pía Urrutia as Cristina Pérez: Sofía's daughter and Tomy's fiancée with Down syndrome
- Daniel Muñoz as Ariel "Coya" Zavala: a former Carabinero who owns the factory where the murder occurred
- Alejandro Trejo as Rafael Santoro, PDI subprefect; Enríquez and Durán's boss

== Production ==
The series was originally meant to tell the story of a 42-year-old nurse who finds out she is pregnant with a baby with Down syndrome, and received a CL$359,230,053 grant for it from the National Television Council. Filming took place in Santiago and began on 27 September 2021.

== Awards and nominations ==
Year	Award	Category	Nominees	Result	Ref.
2023	7th Caleuche Awards	Best leading actor	Sebastián Solorza	Nominated	
2023	7th Caleuche Awards	Best leading actress	Valentina Muhr	Nominated	
2023	7th Caleuche Awards	Best supporting actor	Gastón Salgado	Nominated	
2023	7th Caleuche Awards	Breakthrough actor	Sebastián Solorza	Won	
