= Alejandro Trejo =

Chilean actor and voice actor

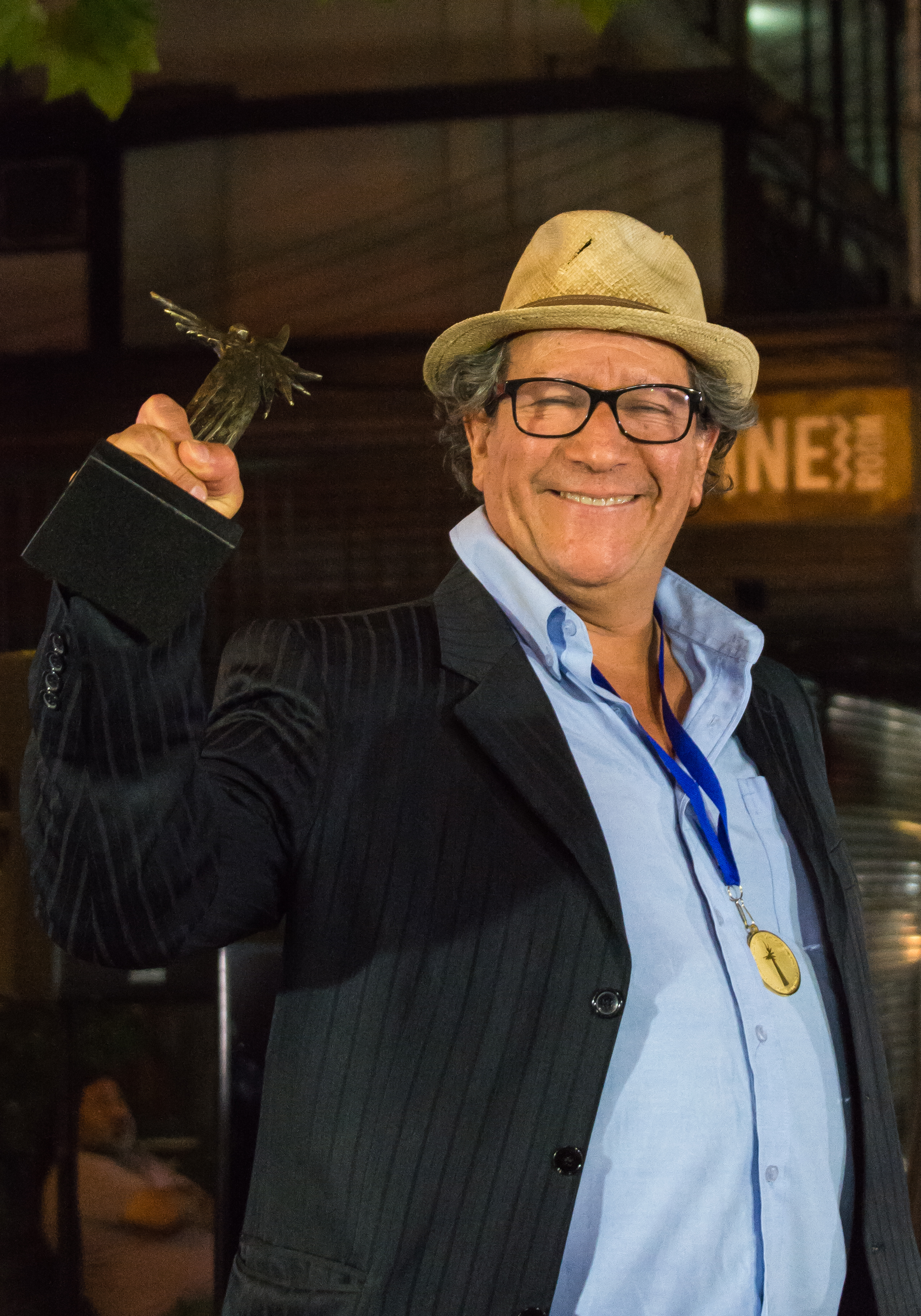
- 2019
- Born: Alejandro Edmundo Trejo Zapata; 8 August 1959 (age 67); Santiago, Chile
- Occupation: Actor
- Awards: Altazor Award (2012)

Alejandro Edmundo Trejo Zapata (born 8 August 1959) is a Chilean theater, television, and voice actor. He is best known for 2001's A Cab for Three, for which he received Best Actor awards at the Cinemanila and Gramado film festivals.

== Biography ==
Alejandro Trejo, a well-known Chilean actor, came to show business almost by chance, because the theater was his second choice. In 1979 he entered the Moneda Theater School directed by Pury Durante. In 1986 he founded, along with Juan Edmundo González, the street theater company El Clavo. As an actor he has participated in numerous plays, among which are Lautaro, by Isidora Aguirre, Historia de un galpón abandonado by Ramón Griffero, Tríptico, and El Señor Presidente, these last two with El Clavo. Later with the company La Batuta he participated in Chronicle of a Death Foretold, where he met Julio Milostich, and in Galileo Galilei. With the group Bufón Negro he has been part of the cast of El coordinador, El solitario, Un dulce aire canalla, and El amor intelectual, all by Benjamín Galemiri. A great theatrical success of his was Nadie es profeta en su espejo, by Jorge Díaz, under the direction of Alejandro Goic, as well as La Condición Humana. He starred in Macbeth under the direction of Englishman Ian Wooldrich, sharing the stage with actor Rodrigo González Rubio. He has made national and international tours. As a director he has distinguished himself with La comarca del jazmín by Óscar Castro, The Martian Chronicles by Ray Bradbury, El libro de Rebeca by Benjamin Galemiri, Loco afán by Pedro Lemebel, and El desvarío by Jorge Díaz, among others. In films, his performances stand out in A Cab for Three, The Sentimental Teaser, Subterra, Machuca, Gente decente, and Los Debutantes. Trejo is also a voice actor who has been in that business for more than 20 years, lending his voice to various commercials, series, and television documentaries.

He has served as a juror for the Caleuche Awards, and hosted their first ceremony in 2016.

== Awards ==
- 2002 Cinemanila International Film Festival Best Actor award for A Cab for Three
- 2002 Gramado Film Festival Best Actor award for A Cab for Three
- 2012 Altazor Award for Best Actor for Los archivos del cardenal

== Filmography ==
=== Films ===
- Historia de lagartos (1989)
- El cobrador (1994)
- The Sentimental Teaser (1999)
- Mi famosa desconocida (2000) – Pato
- A Cab for Three (2001) – Ulises Morales
- Un ladrón y su mujer (2001) – Luis Bahamondes
- Tres noches de un sábado (2002)
- Los Debutantes (2003) – Don Pascual
- Subterra (2003) – Eduardo
- El juego de Arcibel (2003)
- El tesoro de los caracoles (2004)
- Gente decente (2004) – Ernesto
- Machuca (2004) - Willy
- Fuga (2006)
- La Recta Provincia (2007) – Celoso
- The Toast (2007) – Rubén
- Mansacue (2008) – Denizen 1
- Desde el corazón (2009)
- Súper, todo Chile adentro (2009) – Edwin
- Schop Sui (2010)
- Drama (2010)
- My Last Round (2010)
- El Tío (2013)
- Distancia (2015)
- Talión (2015)
- Argentino QL (2016)
- Trauma (2017)
- Sapo (2018)
- La Salamandra (2018)
- Swing (2018)
- Noche (2018)
- Vidas recicladas (2018)
- Perkin (2018)
- Mi amigo Alexis (2019)
- Piola (2020)
- Mientes (2020)
- Prison in the Andes (2023) – Odlanier Mena
- Sayen (2023)
- Thanks for Coming (2023) – Fabio

=== Telenovelas ===
Year	Title	Role	Channel
1986	Ángel malo	Ricardo Álvarez	Canal 13
1997	Rossabella	Aníbal Lizana	Mega
2003	Machos	Víctor Benavides	Canal 13
2004	Hippie	Pedro Leiva	Canal 13
2004	Tentación	Rafael Santelices	Canal 13
2005	Brujas	Gregorio "Goyo" Sánchez	Canal 13
2006	Descarado	Baltazar Garretón	Canal 13
2007	Papi Ricky	Máximo Tapia	Canal 13
2007	Lola	Giovanni Báscoli	Canal 13
2009	Cuenta conmigo	Miguel Sermiento	Canal 13
2009	Corazón rebelde	Raúl Santander	Canal 13
2010	Martín Rivas	Fidel Elías	TVN
2010	Primera Dama	Facundo Madrid	Canal 13
2012	Soltera otra vez	Doctor Vasconcellos	Canal 13
2013	Las Vega's	Carlos Vega	Canal 13
2014	Secretos en el jardín	Roberto Soto	Canal 13
2016	Veinteañero a los 40	Alberto "Tito" Guerra	Canal 13
2016	El camionero	Orlando Cantillana	TVN
2017	Dime quién fue	Roberto Muñoz	TVN
2025	El jardín de Olivia	Luis Emilio Walker	Mega

=== TV series and specials ===
Year	Title	Role	Channel
2002	La vida es una lotería	Lucho	TVN
2007	Dinastía Sa-Sá	Gregorio "Goyo" Sánchez	Canal 13
2007	Héroes	Carlos Rodríguez	Canal 13
2007	Casado con hijos	Animador del programa	Mega
2010	Réquiem de Chile	General René Schneider	Canal 13
2010	Volver a mí	Vladimir Toledo	Canal 13
2011	Los archivos del cardenal	Carlos Pedregal	TVN
2012	Vida por vida	Dr. Pedro Miño	Canal 13
2012	El diario secreto de una profesional	Andrés	TVN
2012	Infieles	Moisés	Chilevisión
2012	Cobre	Víctor Serrano	Mega
2012	Solita camino	Simón Rodríguez	Mega
2013	Malandras	Pedro	VTR
2014	La canción de tu vida	Rubén Muñoz	TVN
2014	Centro de alumnos	Invitado	Mega
2014	Familia moderna	Pelado Arancibia	Mega
2014	Sudamerican Rockers	Profesor	Chilevisión
2015	Sitiados	Alejandro	TVN
2015	Juana Brava	Ambrosio Bravo	TVN
2016	Chico Reality	Rolando Cepeda	Mega
2019–20	Dignity	Mister Jiménez	Joyn, Mega
2022	Chromosome 21	Rafael Santoro	Netflix, Canal 13

=== Voice acting ===
- The Pink Panther Show – The Pink Panther
- Garfield and Friends – Bo
- VeggieTales - Larry the Cucumber (original dub)
- You're Under Arrest – Ken Nakajima
- Stargate SG-1 – Thor (2nd voice)
- Transformers: Animated – Henry Masterson/Headmaster
- Marmalade Boy – Jin Koishikawa
- Kinnikuman – Fight Reporter
- Sonic X – Mr. Tanaka
- Super Robot Monkey Team Hyperforce Go! – Mandarin
- Will and Dewitt – Additional voices
- Fritz Kunz – Comisario Rex
- Red – Marvin Boggs
- Ministry of Housing ad campaign – Armando Casas

=== Voice-over ===
- La Roja Íntima – narrated the qualification of the Chilean national soccer team to the 2010 World Cup in South Africa, broadcast on 14 October 2009 on Canal 13
