= Julio Jung =

Chilean actor (1942–2026)

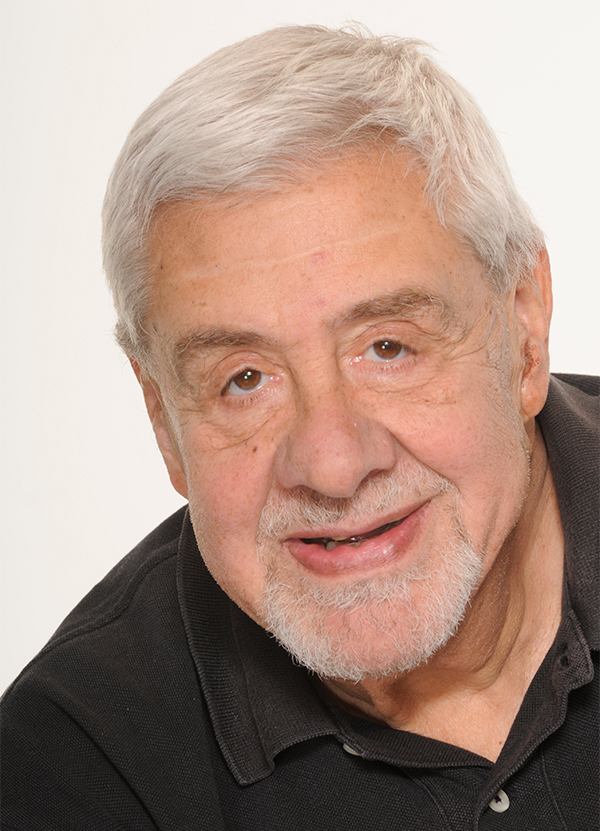
- Jung in 2013
- Born: Julio Humberto Gonzalo Benito Jung del Favero; 21 March 1942; Santiago, Chile
- Died: 6 June 2026 (aged 84); Santiago, Chile
- Occupation: Actor

Julio Humberto Gonzalo Benito Jung del Favero (21 March 1942 – 6 June 2026) was a Chilean actor and comedian.

== Life and career ==
Son of Julio Jung Paulsen and María Antonieta del Favero Comis, he began his artistic career at the age of 18 in radio drama with Justo Ugarte, a career that would extend for more than half a century uninterrupted. He first married María Elena Duvauchelle, with whom he had his only child, the actor Julio Jung Duvauchelle, born in 1978 in political exile in Venezuela; later, he married the designer and businesswoman Tessa Aguadé Bru, daughter of the painter Roser Bru, who arrived in Chile as a child with her family on the ship SS Winnipeg after the Spanish Civil War.

Jung worked in virtually every genre: theater, film, and television. In the 1960s, he worked with the companies of Silvia Piñeiro, Susana Buqué, Los Cuatro, and Teatro el Ángel, before returning in 1966 to the Ictus group, where he remained until 1973. He was also one of the founders of the emblematic television program La manivela.

A neighbor of Interior Minister Edmundo Pérez Zujovic, he witnessed his assassination on 8 June 1971, at the hands of a commando unit of the Vanguardia Organizada del Pueblo (VOP).

He appeared on El show de Antonio Prieto on Channel 13 in Argentina.

On 31 August 1974, he made a brief but important appearance on Sábado Gigante, co-hosting the program with Armando Navarrete, a comedian known for his character Mandolino, in the absence of Mario Kreutzberger "Don Francisco," whose mother had passed away three days earlier.

In late 1974, after the September 1973 military coup—led by General Augusto Pinochet, which overthrew the government of socialist Salvador Allende—Julio Jung went into exile in Caracas, Venezuela, where he continued his acting career in theater (with El Nuevo Grupo Chocron, Chalbaud y Cabrujas, and at the Ateneo), film, and television (Radio Caracas TV and Venevisión). In Venezuela, he also played Rumildo, a character created by Mario Arancibia for a Petróleos de Venezuela (PDVSA) advertising campaign that became an iconic figure in Venezuelan culture. He briefly returned to Chile in 1978 to participate in the comedy program Muchísimo, produced by Jorge Celedón on Canal 13 between June and August of that year.

In 1984, he returned permanently to Chile, where, with his wife María Elena Duvauchelle, he formed a theater company that performed at El Galpón de Los Leones for seven years, staging six plays. Simultaneously, he joined Canal 13, where he acted in television series and, along with Andrés Rillón, launched the program Mediomundo which became a cult classic.

In 1996, he was elected councilman for the Providencia district, serving until 2000. After completing his term, he was appointed by President Ricardo Lagos as Chile's cultural advisor in Barcelona. His tenure there culminated in the mega-event of the 2004 Universal Forum of Cultures: Neruda in the Heart, held at the Palau Sant Jordi to celebrate the poet's centenary.

In 2018, he received a tribute from the Chilean Actors' Union for his career.

In 2016, he was again elected councilman for Providencia. He ran for reelection in 2021 but was not elected.

Jung died in Santiago on 6 June 2026, at the age of 84.

== Filmography ==
=== Films ===
Films
Year	Film	Character
1960	Viaje a Santiago
1970	Voto más fusil	Senador
1982	Rumildo detective privado	Rumildo
1982	La Red
1983	El último grumete	voz
1985	Cortázar, capital Rayuela
1994	Hasta en las mejores familias	Pedro
1994	Amnesia	Zúñiga
1995	La rubia de Kennedy	Profesor Schmidt
1997	Inca de oro	Guatón Ramos
1999	Tuve un sueño contigo	Alcalde Gatica
2000	Coronation	Andrés Ábalos
2004	Cachimba	Felipe
2008	El regalo	Héctor Tito Tapia
2009	Súper	Julio
2009	Desde el corazón	Vicente
2009	The Dancer and the Thief	Alcaide Santoro
2011	Qué pena tu boda	Federico de María
2012	No	Él mismo
2012	Qué pena tu familia	Federico de María
2013	La Patagonia de los sueños
2013	La virtud de la familia
2013	El derechazo	Pedro Puga
2013	El cordero	Patricio
2014	Brillantes
2014	Las cartas secretas de mi madre	Jaime de Aránguiz
2014	Mejor estar solo	Humberto
2015	La sombra del roble	Roberto
2015	Rompecabezas negro	Mario Maza
2016	Suficiente coraje
2016	Neruda	Senador
2015	Héroes: El asilo contra la opresión	El Máquina
2017	Se busca novio... para mi mujer
2017	And Suddenly the Dawn	Francisco Veloso
2017	Oblivion Verses	Funcionario
2017	Silencio	Héctor
2018	Calzones rotos	Coronel Canales
2018	American Huaso	Salam I
2019	Ausencia
2019	Hecho bolsa	Presidente de la compañía
2019	No quiero ser tu hermano
2023	Hasta en las mejores familias, la restauración	Pedro
2025	Replicas	Domingo

=== Telenovelas ===
Telenovelas
Year	Teleserie	Characer	Channel
1977	Soltera y sin compromisos		Radio Caracas TV
1978	El ángel rebelde		Radio Caracas TV
1979	Sangre azul		Radio Caracas TV
1979	Estefanía	Giusseppe Cataldo	Radio Caracas TV
1981	Natalia de ocho a nueve		Radio Caracas TV
1982	Gómez		Radio Caracas TV
1983	Ligia Elena		Venevisión
1983	Julia		Venevisión
1984	Matrimonio de papel	Tamayo	Canal 13
1985	El prisionero de la media noche	Nicolás	Canal 13
1988	Semidios	Mauro	Canal 13
2006	Montecristo	Ulises Farías	Mega
2014	Valió la pena	Lorenzo García	Canal 13
2016	Un diablo con ángel	José Pablo Donoso	TVN

=== TV Series ===
TV Series
Year	Serie	Character	Channel
1989	Contigo pan y caviar	—	RTU
1992	Carlos Carola	Julián Arismendi	TVN
1997	Las historias de Sussi	Marelo Oyadenel	TVN
1998	Página Web	Varios personajes	TVN
2007	Three's Company (Chile)	Amador Melo	Mega
2008	Married... with Children (Chile)	—	Mega
2009	I Dream of Jeannie (Chile)	Víctor Echegaray	TVN
2011	Cumpleaños	Darío Pereira	TVN
2015	The Golden Girls (Chile)	Genaro	UCV
2015	Fabulosas Flores	Vecino de Zaida	La Red

=== TV Shows ===
- Alcance las estrellas: Programa concurso (Canal 13, 1970-1973)
- Juguemos a las 21 y Clases alegres: Programas que animó en la década de 1970 en TVN.
- La manivela: Programa de humor en TVN, Canal 13 y Canal 9
- El niño de papel (Radio Caracas Televisión)
- Muchísimo (Canal 13, 1978)
- Bienvenidos (Venevisión, 1982-1984)
- Mediomundo (Canal 13, 1985-1987 y 1991-1992) - Varios personajes
- ¿Cuánto vale el show? (Chilevisión, 1994-1995)
- Dudo (Canal 13, 2013) - Invitado
- 4 teleseries para (Radio Caracas Televisión)
- 3 teleseries para (Venevisión)
