= Baby Bandito =

- Promotional release poster
- Genre: Heist; Drama
- Written by: Diego Muñoz
- Screenplay by: Juan Andrés Rivera; Luis Pérez García; Valeria Hofmann
- Directed by: Julio Jorquera Arriagada; Fernando Guzzoni; Pepa San Martín
- Starring: Nicolás Contreras; Francisca Armstrong; Pablo Macaya; Carmen Zabala; Lukas Vergara
- Composers: Miguel Miranda; José Miguel Tobar
- Country of origin: Chile
- Original language: Spanish
- No. of seasons: 2
- No. of episodes: 16

Production
- Producers: Ángela Poblete; Carolina Carter; Juan de Dios Larraín; Pablo Larraín; Tomás González
- Cinematography: Arnaldo Rodríguez; M.I. Littin-Menz; Mauro Veloso
- Editors: Javier Estévez; Alvaro Solar; Diego Macho Gómez; Adela Altamirano
- Camera setup: Multi-camera
- Running time: 34–43 min
- Production company: Fabula

Original release
- Network: Netflix
- Release: January 31, 2024 – present

Baby Bandito is a Chilean heist drama television series directed by Julio Jorquera Arriagada, Fernando Guzzoni and Pepa San Martín and written by Diego Muñoz with the screenplay and dialogues were co-written by Juan Andrés Rivera, Luis Pérez García and Valeria Hofmann. Produced by Fabula, and stars Nicolás Contreras, Francisca Armstrong, Pablo Macaya, Carmen Zabala and Lukas Vergara. The series premiered on Netflix on January 31, 2024. Season 2 premiered on October 22, 2025.

== Cast ==
- Nicolás Contreras as Kevin
- Francisca Armstrong as Génesis
- Pablo Macaya as Pantera
- Carmen Zabala as Mistica
- Lukas Vergara as Panda
- Mario Horton as Galgo
- Mauricio Pesutic as El Carnicero
- Daniel Muñoz as Pedro
- Marcelo Alonso as Ruso
- Mariana Loyola as Ana
- Francisca Imboden as Fiscal Soraya
- Ricardo Fernández as Comisario Bozo
- Amparo Noguera as Natalia
- Vesta Lugg as Ludovica
- Diego Muñoz as Rambo
- Antonia Zegers as Paloma
- Florencia Berner as America
- Simon Pesutic as Alex
- Gabriel Urzua as Gustavo

== Production ==
In June 2023, The series was announced on Netflix. The filming took place in Chile and Italy. The trailer of the series was released on December 13, 2023.

== Reception ==
Melissa Camacho of Common Sense Media rated the series 3 stars out of 5. Joel Keller of Decider reviewed the series.
