= Thanks for Coming =

2023 Chilean drama film

- Theatrical release poster
- Directed by: Taiyo Yamazaki
- Written by: Taiyo Yamazaki; Cristóbal Acevedo
- Produced by: Nicolás Heimrich Morales
- Starring: Daniel Candia; Alejandro Trejo
- Cinematography: Piero Bravo
- Edited by: Antonia Quiroz
- Production companies: Kazoku Films; Universidad del Desarrollo
- Release dates: September 2, 2023 (FICPBA); September 26, 2024 (Chile)
- Running time: 72 minutes
- Country: Chile
- Language: Spanish

Thanks for Coming (Spanish: Gracias por venir) is a 2023 Chilean drama film co-written and directed by Taiyo Yamazaki in his directorial debut. Starring Daniel Candia and Alejandro Trejo. It is about a family facing the death of the grandfather in their soon-to-be-sold vacation home.

== Synopsis ==
After his father's death and learning that he will lose the house where he and his family have vacationed for more than 25 years, Nancho and his family will seek a way to sabotage the sale and fight to keep the place that belongs to them, where they have created unforgettable memories and moments. But Nancho's attachment and stubbornness will lead the family to make drastic decisions.

== Cast ==
- Daniel Candia as Nancho
- Alejandro Trejo as Fabio
- Alejandra Yáñez as Rosa
- América Navarro as Nicole
- Roberto Villena as Elías
- Daniela Fredes
- Igor Cantillana

== Release ==
Thanks for Coming had its world premiere on September 2, 2023, at the 1st Buenos Aires Province International Film Festival, and was then screened on November 20, 2023, at the 36th Exground Film Festival.

The film was released commercially on September 26, 2024, in Chilean theaters.
