= Plaza Camilo Mori =

Square in Santiago, Chile

Coordinates: 33°25′56″S 70°38′05″W

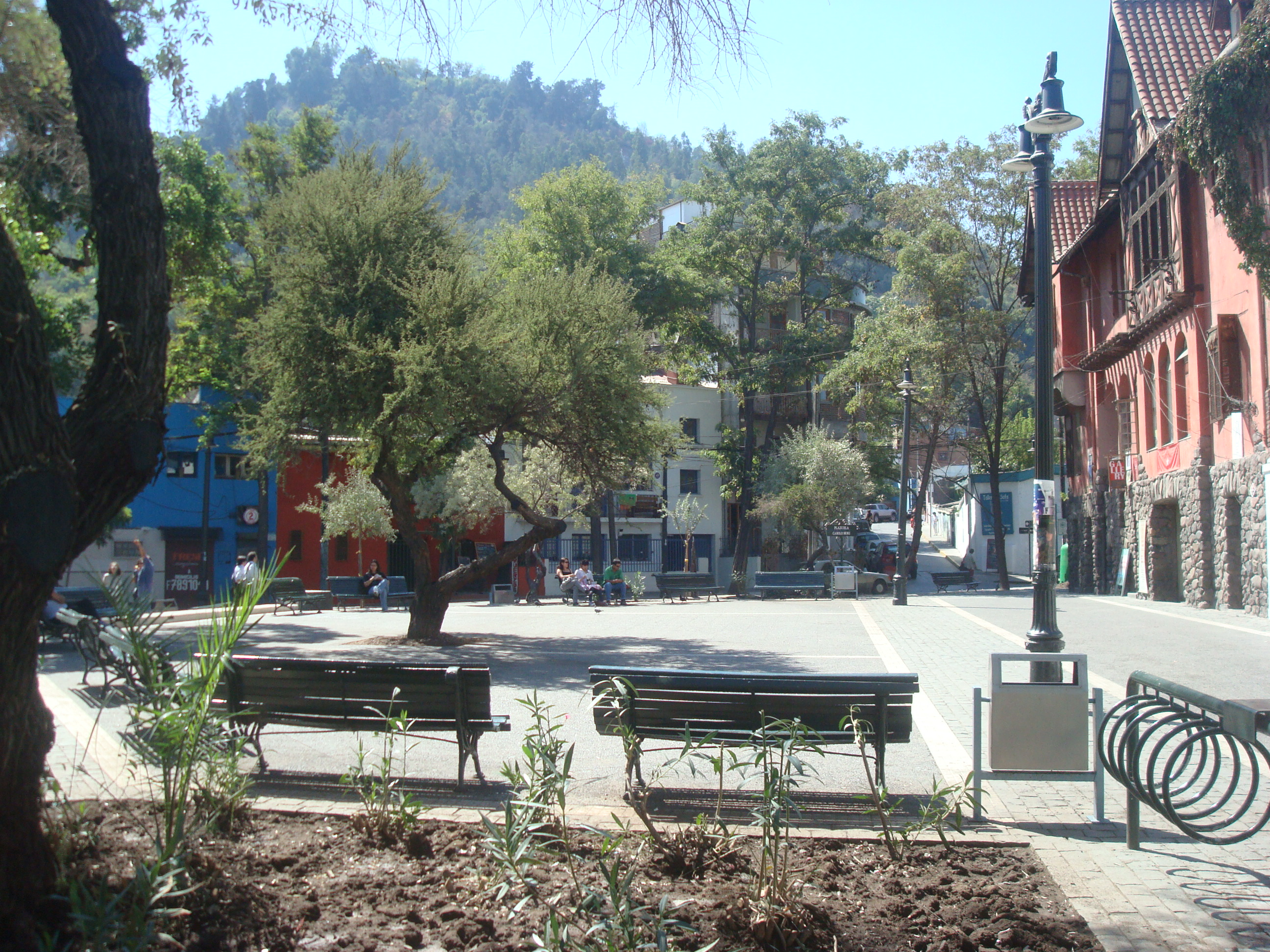
Plaza Camilo Mori.

Plaza Camilo Mori (Camilo Mori Square) is located in the commune of Providencia, in Santiago, Chile, between the streets of Constitución and Antonia López de Bello, in the heart of Barrio Bellavista. One block away is Pio Nono street, which leads to the Chilean National Zoo and San Cristóbal Hill. Plaza Camilo Mori is also an important meeting place for bohemian culture in Santiago, where important places such as the house-museum of Pablo Neruda (known as La Chascona), the Centro Mori, pubs and restaurants spreading from the plaza south along Constitución street and above all, a great number of workshops, theatres and cultural centers can be found. Nemesio Antúnez, Pablo Neruda, Mario Baeza and Camilo Mori are examples of how artists have given their names to this part of Barrio Bellavista. Access to the square is via station Baquedano of the Santiago Metro.
