= La Nany =

- Genre: Sitcom
- Created by: Megavisión
- Starring: Alejandra Herrera; Alex Zisis; Fernando Larraín; Francisca Castillo; Camila López; Maximiliano Valenzuela; Vania Vilas; Grimanesa Jiménez; Carmen Gloria Bresky; Nelly Meruane
- Country of origin: Chile
- Original language: Spanish
- No. of seasons: 1
- No. of episodes: 106

Production
- Executive producers: J.J. Harting; Ignacio Eyzaguirre
- Running time: 48 minutes (approx.)

Original release
- Network: Mega
- Release: 2005 – 2006

La Nany is a Chilean sitcom based on the American television series The Nanny. It was aired from 2005 to March 2006, when it was followed by Casado con hijos, the Chilean version of Married... with Children.

== Plot ==
Eliana "Nany" Tapia is a woman who comes to work in the mansion of a wealthy family, in the suburbs of La Dehesa, Santiago, after being fired from a bridal shop in the Florida Center Shopping Mall. The family she works for is formed by the widower Max Valdivieso, his three children, Catalina, Sofía, and Tomás, and his butler Bruno. Max's assistant, Loreto, has a rivalry against Eliana and Bruno. She will do everything possible to try to fire them. In some cases, Eliana and Loreto and will have to work together to get out of trouble. Loreto is very fond of Max and the two both have a relationship at the beginning of the series.

== Cast ==
- Alejandra Herrera as Eliana Melina Tapia Cárdenas
- Alex Zisis as Maximiliano Valdivieso
- Fernando Larraín as Bruno Órdenes, the Butler
- Francisca Castillo as Loreto López de Lérida
- Camila López as Catalina Valdivieso
- Maximiliano Valenzuela as Tomás Valdivieso
- Vania Vilas as Sofía Valdivieso
- Grimanesa Jiménez as Silvia Cárdenas
- Carmen Gloria Bresky as Valeska Patricia Torres
- Nelly Meruane as Yaya
