= Muñeca (film) =

- Theatrical release poster
- Directed by: Sebastián Arrau
- Written by: Sebastián Arrau; Fernando Aragón
- Produced by: Mauricio Arrau
- Starring: Benjamín Vicuña; Marcial Tagl
- Cinematography: Ricardo de Angelis
- Edited by: Soledad Salfate
- Music by: Cristián Freund
- Production companies: Alce Producciones Ltda. Lapsus Producciones
- Distributed by: BF Distribution
- Release dates: October 2008 (FICV); December 4, 2008 (Chile)
- Running time: 83 minutes
- Country: Chile
- Language: Spanish

Muñeca (lit. 'Doll'; also known as Muñeca, cuestión de sexo, lit. 'Doll, matter of sex') is a 2008 Chilean drama film directed by Sebastián Arrau (in his directorial debut) and written by Arrau & Fernando Aragón. Starring Benjamín Vicuña and Marcial Tagle. It won the Great Paoa awards for Best National Film and Best Leading Actor (National) for Marcial Tagle at the 20th Viña del Mar International Film Festival.

== Synopsis ==
Manuel and Pedro are extremely close friends. The former is an insatiable, acid and critical womanizer, while the latter is a solitary homosexual who views the social changes the country is undergoing with optimistic eyes. Desperate for Pedro to find meaning in his life, his friend organizes an appointment with Gabriela, a forty-year-old woman, whom he met through the internet, and who, in a hurry by her biological clock, is looking for a father for her son. A new Chile inspires Pedro to take a step previously unimagined for a homosexual: becoming a father.

== Cast ==
The actors participating in this film are:

- Benjamín Vicuña as Pedro
  - Andrés Sáiz as Pedro Child
- Marcial Tagle as Manuel
- Ana Fernández as Gabriela
- María de Los Ángeles García as Loli
- Catalina Guerra as Pedro's Mom
- Francisco Neculman as Porn Star 1
- Hector Cabrera as Porn Star 2

== Release ==
=== Festivals ===
Muñeca had its world premiere at the beginning of October 2008 at the 15th Valdivia International Film Festival, then it was screened on November 17, 2018, at the 20th Viña del Mar International Film Festival.

=== Theatrical ===
It was scheduled to be released commercially in theaters sometime in November 2008, but was pushed back to December 4, 2008.

== Reception ==
=== Box-office ===
After 4 weeks on the billboard, it caught a total of 15.374 viewers, collecting $40.258.772 Chilean pesos.

=== Accolades ===
Year	Award / Festival	Category	Recipient	Result	Ref.
2008	Viña del Mar International Film Festival	Great Paoa - Best National Film	Muñeca	Won	
2008	Viña del Mar International Film Festival	Best Leading Actor (National)	Marcial Tagle	Won	
