= El baño (2005 film) =

- Directed by: Gregory Cohen
- Written by: Gregory Cohen
- Produced by: Rodrigo Orellana
- Production company: Producciones Audiovisuales Dospasos Ltda.
- Release date: 17 November 2005
- Running time: 88 minutes
- Country: Chile
- Language: Spanish

El baño (lit. 'Bathroom') is a 2005 Chilean black comedy film directed by Gregory Cohen with Juan Pablo Bastidas, Faride Kaid, Aline Küppenheim and Ramón Llao. The action takes place in a bathroom in a family house in Santiago at the time of the Chilean military coup of 1973. The action is all shot with a camera fixed in a corner.

== Cast ==
- Alex Zisis
- Pablo Macaya
- Faryde Kaid as Ángela
- Aline Küppenheim
- Eduardo Marambio
- Juan Barahona
- Juan Pablo Bastidas as the Doctor
- Ramón Llao
- Lía Maldonado
- Jaime MacManus
- Igor Rosenmann
- Loreto Moya
- Álvaro Espinoza
- José Luis Aguilera
- Liliana García

== Awards ==
- Premio Especial del Público (Special Public Prize), Festival Internacional de Cine Digital de Viña del Mar (International Film Festival in Viña del Mar), Chile, 2005
- Premio Especial del Jurado (Special Jury Prize), Premio Especial del Público Festival Internacional de Cine Latinoamericano Marseille (Special Prize of the Public International Festival of Latin American film in Marseille), France, 2006
