= Diego Muñoz =

Chilean actor

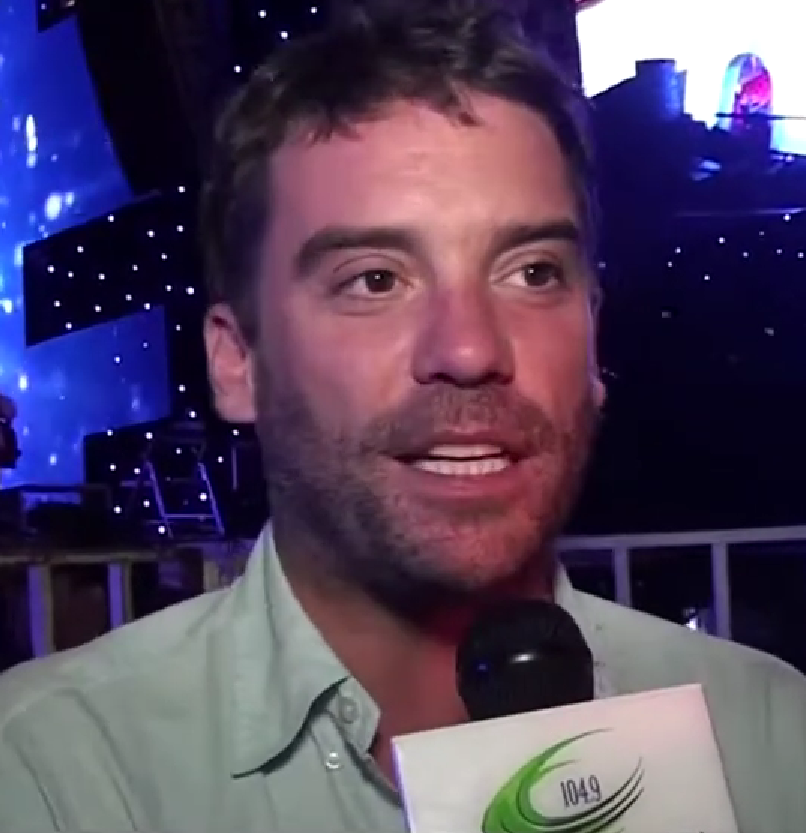
- Muñoz in 2012
- Born: Diego Muñoz Erenchun; February 11, 1976 (age 50); Santiago, Chile
- Occupations: Actor, director
- Years active: 1998–

Diego Muñoz Erenchun (born February 11, 1976) is a Chilean actor of film, television and theatre. He is also creative director of the fiction area of Centro Mori.

== Biography ==
He studied at Saint George's College until II ° Medio, later finishing his studies at Colegio Francisco de Asís de Las Condes. He has maintained a close relationship of friendship since this time with fellow actors Nicolás Saavedra and Mariana Loyola.

Graduated from the Fernando González Theater School, where he was a partner of Gonzalo Valenzuela, another great friend of the actor.

In 1998 he made his debut in the television series Borrón y cuenta nueva, on Televisión Nacional de Chile. Later he participated in other dramatic productions on Channel 13. He established himself as an actor and heartthrob in the television series Machos.

At the same time, he has participated in various films including Sábado y Malta con Huevo, and theatrical productions.

He played José Antonio Pérez Cotapos, in the series Héroes (Channel 13, 2007). In 2010 he starred in the TVN production, Martín Rivas.

In his theatrical work he has acted in plays such as "Games at siesta time" and directed in Are you there? in 2008.

During the 2010s he had supporting roles in four Pablo Larraín's films; No, El club, Neruda, and Ema.

== Filmography ==
=== Films ===
Year	Film	Character
1998	Año nuevo, vida nueva (short)	
1998	El entusiasmo	Fernando joven
2000	Dos hermanos: En un lugar de la noche	Agustín
2003	Sábado	Diego
2007	Life Kills Me	Álvaro
2007	Scrambled Beer	Vladimir
2009	Súper, todo Chile adentro	Leo
2009	Weekend	Novio de Francisca
2010	Drama	Romeo
2012	No	Carlos
2013	El Tío	Militar
2015	El club	Diego
2016	Neruda	Martínez
2019	Ema	surfer 2

=== Telenovelas ===
Year	Título	Character
1998	Borrón y cuenta nueva	Luis García
1999	Cerro Alegre	Jorge Andrés "Koke" León Thompson
2001	Corazón Pirata	Danilo Marambio
2003	Machos	Amaro Mercader
2004	Hippie	José Francisco "Pancho" Arrieta Vicuña
2004–2005	Tentación	Vicente Urrutia
2005–2006	Gatas y tuercas	Joaquín Mena
2006	Charly Tango	Tomás Riquelme
2007–2008	Lola	Gastón Correa
2010	Martín Rivas	Martín Rivas
2011	Témpano	Nicolás Duarte Pereira
2012	Reserva de familia	Raúl Ruiz-Tagle
2013	Dos por uno	Ramiro Hernández/ Valentina Infante
2014	El amor lo manejo yo	Julián Jiménez
2015	Dueños del paraíso	Gerardo Casanegra
2016–2017	Sres. Papis	Gustavo Olavarría
2018–2019	Casa de muñecos	Santiago Valladares
2019–2020	100 días para enamorarse	Pedro Valdés
2021–2022	Pobre novio	Eduardo Santander
2023–2024	Como la vida misma	Alonso Valdéz
2025-2026	Reunión de superados	Jorge Andrés "Coke" Benavides

=== Series and unitaries ===
- 2002: Más que Amigos as Rodrigo Osorio
- 2007: Héroes as José Antonio Pérez Cotapos
- 2013: Prófugos as Gabriel Villalobos
- 2020: La jauría, as Marco Valdés
- 2026: Baby Bandito, as Rambo
