= The First of Us =

Argentine telenovela

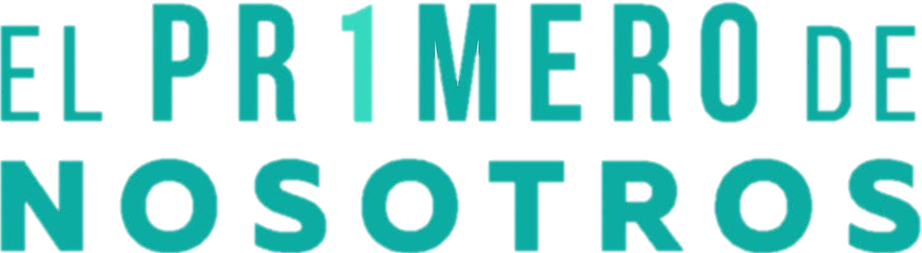
- Spanish: El primero de nosotros
- Genre: Telenovela
- Written by: Ernesto Korovsky; Romina Moretto
- Directed by: Pablo Vásquez; Pablo Ambrosino
- Creative director: Jorge Bechara
- Starring: Benjamín Vicuña; Paola Krum; Luciano Castro; Jorgelina Aruzzi; Damián de Santo; Mercedes Funes
- Theme music composer: Alberto Salerno; Renato Pareti; Fernando López Rossi
- Opening theme: "No Te Vayas" by Federico Coates
- Country of origin: Argentina
- Original language: Spanish
- No. of seasons: 1
- No. of episodes: 59 (list of episodes)

Production
- Executive producer: Alelén Villanueva
- Producers: Diego González; Gabriel Aiello; Gastón Smith; Sol Posse Molina
- Production location: Buenos Aires
- Cinematography: Alberto Echenique; Diego Cascini
- Editors: Andrés Britos; Laura Rego; Santiago McCormack; Leonardo Cartier; Ezequiel Chamorro
- Camera setup: Multi-camera
- Running time: 40–62 minutes
- Production company: Viacom International Studios

Original release
- Network: Telefe; Paramount+
- Release: 21 March – 30 June 2022

The First of Us (Spanish: El primero de nosotros, stylized as: EL PR1MERO DE NOSOTROS, English: THE F1RST OF US) is an Argentine telenovela produced by Viacom International Studios that premiered on 21 March 2022 on Telefe. It is written by Ernesto Korovsky and Romina Moretto, and directed by Pablo Vásquez and Pablo Ambrosino. It stars Benjamín Vicuña, Paola Krum, Luciano Castro, Jorgelina Aruzzi, Damián de Santo and Mercedes Funes.

== Plot ==
The story focuses on the life of a group of friends, who are in their 40s and undergo a great change when they find out that one of them, Santiago (Benjamín Vicuña), suffers from a terminal illness, after having experienced the first symptom at a dinner and be cared for in hospital. From there, the news leave everyone shocked, putting them in close proximity to death, which moves them deeply and keeps them restless.

== Cast ==
=== Main ===
- Benjamín Vicuña as Santiago Luna
- Paola Krum as Jimena Rauch
- Luciano Castro as Nicolás Torres
- Jorgelina Aruzzi as Valeria Perell
- Damián de Santo as Ignacio "Nacho" Reinoso
- Mercedes Funes as Soledad González

=== Recurring ===
- Daniel Fanego as Ernesto "Ernie" Luna
- Rafael Ferro as Martín Hermida
- Carola Reyna as Karina Pereyra
- Adriana Salonia as Mariana Herrera
- Nicolás Riera as Cristian García
- Sebastián Presta as Gustavo Sanguinetti
- Noralíh Gago as Margarita Litardo
- Karina Hernández as Raquel Russo
- Rocío Gómez Wlosko as Uma Luna
- José Giménez Zapiola as Pedro Reinoso
- Federico Pezet as Nahuel Reinoso
- Valentino Casado as Matías Sanguinetti
- Fernanda Metilli as Sofía
- Agustín García Moreno as Agustín

=== Guest ===
- Johanna Francella as Zoe
- Benjamín Alfonso as Marcelo Alonso
- Andrea Frigerio as Samantha Koch
- Micaela Wasserman as Lola Hermida
- Candela Saitta as Olivia Hermida
- Gastón Ricaud as Harvey
- Alexia Moyano as Carla
- Marita Ballesteros as Adriana
- Sergio Surraco as Javier Soria
- Mercedes Oviedo as Andrea Gentile
- Liliana Popovich as Teresa
- Gino Renni as Tano
- Simón Hempe as Jonathan
- Mariela Pizzo as Sara
- Ana Livingston as Roxy
- Azul Araya as Ana
- Lautaro Romero as Federico
- Jana Juárez as Camila
- Olivia Rivadulla as Melina
- Natalia D'Alena as Ámbar
- Nicole Luis as Daisy
- Leonardo Murúa as Jaime
- Silvana Sosto as Elizabeth Bernal
- Daniel Gallardo as Ayrton Fernández
- Ramiro Vayo as Klimovsky
- Silvina Diez as Luciana
- Hervé Segata as Luca Castillo

== Episodes ==
No.	Title	Directed by	Written by	Original release date	ARG viewers (millions)
1	"Los sospechosos de siempre"	Pablo Vásquez & Pablo Ambrosino	Ernesto Korovsky & Romina Moretto	March 21, 2022	15.6
2	"El pacto y las metas"	Pablo Vásquez & Pablo Ambrosino	Ernesto Korovsky & Romina Moretto	March 22, 2022	15.1
3	"La verdad"	Pablo Vásquez & Pablo Ambrosino	Ernesto Korovsky & Romina Moretto	March 23, 2022	14.6
4	"Carpe diem"	Pablo Vásquez & Pablo Ambrosino	Ernesto Korovsky & Romina Moretto	March 24, 2022	11.4
5	"El padre ausente"	Pablo Vásquez & Pablo Ambrosino	Ernesto Korovsky & Romina Moretto	March 28, 2022	14.5
6	"Escucha tu corazón"	Pablo Vásquez & Pablo Ambrosino	Ernesto Korovsky & Romina Moretto	March 29, 2022	10.9
7	"Brindemos"	Pablo Vásquez & Pablo Ambrosino	Ernesto Korovsky & Romina Moretto	March 30, 2022	13.9
8	"La operación"	Pablo Vásquez & Pablo Ambrosino	Ernesto Korovsky & Romina Moretto	March 31, 2022	13.3
9	"Los resultados"	Pablo Vásquez & Pablo Ambrosino	Ernesto Korovsky & Romina Moretto	April 4, 2022	14.2
10	"Despedida de soltero"	Pablo Vásquez & Pablo Ambrosino	Ernesto Korovsky & Romina Moretto	April 5, 2022	12.6
11	"El karaoke"	Pablo Vásquez & Pablo Ambrosino	Ernesto Korovsky & Romina Moretto	April 6, 2022	12.5
12	"Decir sí"	Pablo Vásquez & Pablo Ambrosino	Ernesto Korovsky & Romina Moretto	April 7, 2022	13.2
13	"El casamiento"	Pablo Vásquez & Pablo Ambrosino	Ernesto Korovsky & Romina Moretto	April 11, 2022	14.8
14	"El componente anímico"	Pablo Vásquez & Pablo Ambrosino	Ernesto Korovsky & Romina Moretto	April 12, 2022	11.8
15	"Explota todo"	Pablo Vásquez & Pablo Ambrosino	Ernesto Korovsky & Romina Moretto	April 13, 2022	11.3
16	"Latidos"	Pablo Vásquez & Pablo Ambrosino	Ernesto Korovsky & Romina Moretto	April 14, 2022	10.6
17	"Premoniciones"	Pablo Vásquez & Pablo Ambrosino	Ernesto Korovsky & Romina Moretto	April 18, 2022	13.0
18	"A los chicos sí"	Pablo Vásquez & Pablo Ambrosino	Ernesto Korovsky & Romina Moretto	April 19, 2022	13.1
19	"La duda"	Pablo Vásquez & Pablo Ambrosino	Ernesto Korovsky & Romina Moretto	April 20, 2022	12.6
20	"La confirmación"	Pablo Vásquez & Pablo Ambrosino	Ernesto Korovsky & Romina Moretto	April 21, 2022	12.1
21	"Los sentimientos a flor de piel"	Pablo Vásquez & Pablo Ambrosino	Ernesto Korovsky & Romina Moretto	April 25, 2022	11.6
22	"Pedir demasiado"	Pablo Vásquez & Pablo Ambrosino	Ernesto Korovsky & Romina Moretto	April 26, 2022	9.8
23	"Tener un hermanito"	Pablo Vásquez & Pablo Ambrosino	Ernesto Korovsky & Romina Moretto	April 27, 2022	11.3
24	"El padre de la criatura"	Pablo Vásquez & Pablo Ambrosino	Ernesto Korovsky & Romina Moretto	April 28, 2022	12.0
25	"Demasiada presión"	Pablo Vásquez & Pablo Ambrosino	Ernesto Korovsky & Romina Moretto	May 2, 2022	9.8
26	"Volver a estar de pie"	Pablo Vásquez & Pablo Ambrosino	Ernesto Korovsky & Romina Moretto	May 3, 2022	11.8
27	"Motivos para celebrar"	Pablo Vásquez & Pablo Ambrosino	Ernesto Korovsky & Romina Moretto	May 4, 2022	11.2
28	"Algo empieza a cambiar"	Pablo Vásquez & Pablo Ambrosino	Ernesto Korovsky & Romina Moretto	May 5, 2022	11.9
29	"A buen puerto"	Pablo Vásquez & Pablo Ambrosino	Ernesto Korovsky & Romina Moretto	May 9, 2022	10.8
30	"Esta noche, los tres"	Pablo Vásquez & Pablo Ambrosino	Ernesto Korovsky & Romina Moretto	May 10, 2022	10.4
31	"El dolor de la verdad"	Pablo Vásquez & Pablo Ambrosino	Ernesto Korovsky & Romina Moretto	May 11, 2022	9.7
32	"En carne viva"	Pablo Vásquez & Pablo Ambrosino	Ernesto Korovsky & Romina Moretto	May 12, 2022	11.2
33	"Más allá del tiempo y del espacio"	Pablo Vásquez & Pablo Ambrosino	Ernesto Korovsky & Romina Moretto	May 16, 2022	10.5
34	"Amor de amigas"	Pablo Vásquez & Pablo Ambrosino	Ernesto Korovsky & Romina Moretto	May 17, 2022	10.6
35	"Los dos acompañantes"	Pablo Vásquez & Pablo Ambrosino	Ernesto Korovsky & Romina Moretto	May 18, 2022	10.9
36	"Lo mejor para ella"	Pablo Vásquez & Pablo Ambrosino	Ernesto Korovsky & Romina Moretto	May 19, 2022	9.9
37	"Una mujer muy misteriosa"	Pablo Vásquez & Pablo Ambrosino	Ernesto Korovsky & Romina Moretto	May 23, 2022	10.1
38	"Motivos para estar celosa"	Pablo Vásquez & Pablo Ambrosino	Ernesto Korovsky & Romina Moretto	May 24, 2022	9.7
39	"Sosteniendo el espiritú"	Pablo Vásquez & Pablo Ambrosino	Ernesto Korovsky & Romina Moretto	May 25, 2022	8.9
40	"Partidas"	Pablo Vásquez & Pablo Ambrosino	Ernesto Korovsky & Romina Moretto	May 26, 2022	8.2
41	"Volver al hogar"	Pablo Vásquez & Pablo Ambrosino	Ernesto Korovsky & Romina Moretto	May 30, 2022	9.1
42	"Parejas que se rompen y otras que..."	Pablo Vásquez & Pablo Ambrosino	Ernesto Korovsky & Romina Moretto	May 31, 2022	8.8
43	"Hacerse cargo"	Pablo Vásquez & Pablo Ambrosino	Ernesto Korovsky & Romina Moretto	June 1, 2022	9.5
44	"Visitas"	Pablo Vásquez & Pablo Ambrosino	Ernesto Korovsky & Romina Moretto	June 2, 2022	8.8
45	"El esperado encuentro"	Pablo Vásquez & Pablo Ambrosino	Ernesto Korovsky & Romina Moretto	June 6, 2022	10.7
46	"Ser padres hoy"	Pablo Vásquez & Pablo Ambrosino	Ernesto Korovsky & Romina Moretto	June 7, 2022	9.3
47	"Ni un minuto de paz"	Pablo Vásquez & Pablo Ambrosino	Ernesto Korovsky & Romina Moretto	June 8, 2022	10.0
48	"Ámbar La Fox"	Pablo Vásquez & Pablo Ambrosino	Ernesto Korovsky & Romina Moretto	June 9, 2022	9.7
49	"En familia"	Pablo Vásquez & Pablo Ambrosino	Ernesto Korovsky & Romina Moretto	June 13, 2022	11.0
50	"Cartas a Julián"	Pablo Vásquez & Pablo Ambrosino	Ernesto Korovsky & Romina Moretto	June 14, 2022	10.2
51	"Muchas sorpresas"	Pablo Vásquez & Pablo Ambrosino	Ernesto Korovsky & Romina Moretto	June 15, 2022	10.1
52	"A corazón abierto"	Pablo Vásquez & Pablo Ambrosino	Ernesto Korovsky & Romina Moretto	June 16, 2022	9.8
53	"Bromas que no se hacen"	Pablo Vásquez & Pablo Ambrosino	Ernesto Korovsky & Romina Moretto	June 20, 2022	8.9
54	"Entre la vida y la muerte"	Pablo Vásquez & Pablo Ambrosino	Ernesto Korovsky & Romina Moretto	June 21, 2022	10.4
55	"Julián"	Pablo Vásquez & Pablo Ambrosino	Ernesto Korovsky & Romina Moretto	June 22, 2022	10.7
56	"Fuera de control"	Pablo Vásquez & Pablo Ambrosino	Ernesto Korovsky & Romina Moretto	June 23, 2022	11.0
57	"La quiero toda"	Pablo Vásquez & Pablo Ambrosino	Ernesto Korovsky & Romina Moretto	June 27, 2022	11.1
58	"Fiestón fiestón"	Pablo Vásquez & Pablo Ambrosino	Ernesto Korovsky & Romina Moretto	June 28, 2022	9.9
59	"El primero de nosotros"	Pablo Vásquez & Pablo Ambrosino	Ernesto Korovsky & Romina Moretto	June 30, 2022	12.6

== Reception ==
=== Critical response ===
The debut season of The First of Us received positive responses from critics. According to Emanuel Respighi of Página 12, the telenovela "has a deep story, which escapes the comedy of manners, mature in its genesis, trigger and development, a fiction that invites viewers to enter a dimension of human existence with the strange paradox of celebrating life". In a review for Clarín, Graciela Guiñazú wrote: "is one of those dramas that make us lump in throat" with a solid cast and described the plot as "a story in which it is sensed that love, fears, humor, doubts and hope will sustain the inevitable outcome".
