= Drama (2010 film) =

- Directed by: Matias Lira
- Starring: Eusebio Arenas; Isidora Urrejola
- Release date: 7 October 2010
- Running time: 80 minutes
- Country: Chile
- Language: Spanish

Drama is a 2010 Chilean drama film directed by Matias Lira.

== Plot ==
Mateo, Ángel, and María are three young theater students influenced by their professor, Dante. They carry out the "Artodian" technique created by the Frenchman Antonin Artaud, seeking a real reaction such as pain and suffering, and they are sent to the streets to seek experiences that they will later represent in class.

== Cast ==
- Eusebio Arenas - Mateo
- Isidora Urrejola - María
- Diego Ruiz - Ángel
- Jaime McManus - Dante
- Eduardo Paxeco - Johnny
- Alejandro Goic - Padre
- Fernanda Urrejola - Madre
- Benjamín Vicuña - Max
- Diego Muñoz - Romeo
- Alejandro Trejo - Don Tonny
