= Hecho bolsa =

- Theatrical release poster
- Directed by: Felipe Izquierdo
- Screenplay by: Felipe Izquierdo
- Based on: Hecho bolsa by Felipe Izquierdo
- Produced by: Felipe Izquierdo
- Starring: Felipe Izquierdo
- Cinematography: Felipe Izquierdo
- Edited by: Felipe Izquierdo
- Music by: Felipe Izquierdo
- Production company: Picardia Films
- Release date: August 8, 2019
- Running time: 96 minutes
- Country: Chile
- Language: Spanish

Hecho bolsa (lit. 'Made bag', which is interpreted as lit. 'Being Tired') is a 2019 Chilean comedy film written, directed, produced, starred, filmed, scored and edited by Felipe Izquierdo (in his directorial debut) who is accompanied by Bélgica Castro, Julio Jung, Erick Polhammer, Francisca Imboden and Fernando Larraín. It is based on the tetral monologue of the same name by the same director. It premiered on August 8, 2019, in Chilean theaters.

== Synopsis ==
Alfredo is a publicist who wakes up to constant harassment from those around him. Even the city seems to persecute him, with rain falling as if a dark cloud were fixed permanently above his head.

== Cast ==
The actors participating in this film are:

- Felipe Izquierdo as Alfredo
  - Clemente Palma del Pino as Alfredo Kid
- Bélgica Castro as Mother
- Julio Jung as President of the company
- Erick Polhammer as Psychiatrist
- Francisca Imboden as Alfredo's wife
- Fernando Larraín as Alfredo's coworker
- Silvia Santelices as Teacher
- Marcial Tagle as Mánager
- Francisco Acuña as Hitman
- María José Quiroz as Psychiatrist's secretary
- Rafael Gumucio as San Pedro
- María Olga Mate as Bank Executive
- Tomas Izquierdo as Son 1
- Valentina Izquierdo as Daughter
- Mariano Riesco as Son 2
- Isidro Valdés as Son-in-law
