= Benjamín Vicuña =

Chilean actor and entrepreneur (born 1978)

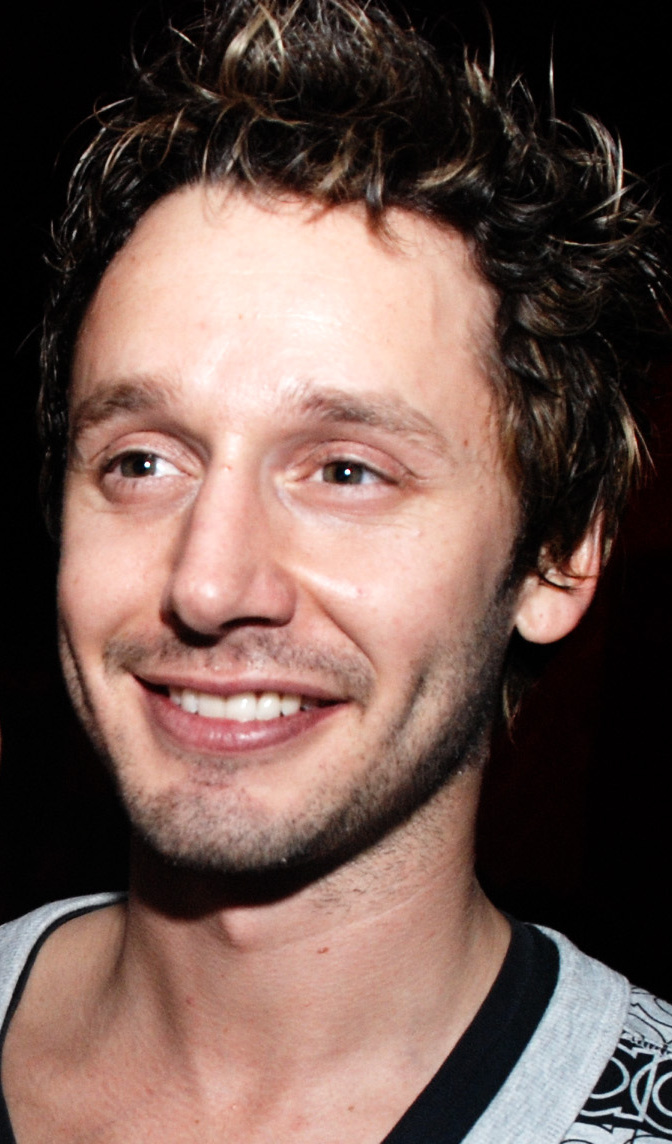
- Vicuña in 2009
- Born: Benjamín Vicuña Luco; November 29, 1978 (age 47); Santiago, Chile
- Education: University of Chile
- Occupations: Actor; entrepreneur
- Years active: 1998–present
- Partners: Pampita (2005–2015); China Suárez (2015–2021)
- Children: 6 (one deceased)

Benjamín Vicuña Luco (born 29 November 1978) is a Chilean actor and entrepreneur.

== Biography ==
Vicuña was born on November 29, 1978, to father Juan Pablo Vicuña Parot and mother Isabel Luco Morandé. He is a descendant of Benjamín Vicuña Mackenna, a Chilean historian and politician of Basque and Irish descent. He studied theatre at the University of Chile.

Vicuña founded the Centro Mori and was appointed as a goodwill ambassador of UNICEF Chile in 2008.

Vicuña was in a relationship with Argentine model Carolina Ardohain from 2005 to 2015, and the couple has four children together; one daughter, Blanca (2006-2012) and three sons, Bautista (born in 2008), Beltrán (born in 2012) and Benicio (born in 2014). He was in a relationship with Argentine actress China Suárez from 2015 to 2021, and the couple has two children together: daughter Magnolia (born in 2018) and son Amancio (born in 2020).

== Acting credits ==
Key
†	Denotes works that have not yet been released

=== Film ===
Year	Title	Character	Director
2001	Lucha social digital	Efraín	Boris Quercia
2002	Paraíso B	Jimmy	Nicolás Acuña
2003	XS: The Worst Size	Víctor Camus	Jorge López Sotomayor
2004	Promedio rojo	Fele	Nicolás López
2004	Mujeres Infieles	'OJala M1s b0l4s	Rodrigo Ortúzar
2004	El roto: Perjudícame Cariño	Sebastián	Alberto Daiber
2004	Las hormigas asesinas	Paul Kazán	Alberto Fuguet
2004	No Me Toques		Mauro Bravo
2005	Juego de Verano	Leandro	Fernanda Aljaro y Matías Bize
2005	Se Arrienda	Paul Kazán	Alberto Fuguet
2006	Fuga	Eliseo Montalbán	Pablo Larraín
2008	Chef's Special	Horacio	Nacho G. Velilla
2008	Muñeca	Pedro	Sebastián Arrau
2009	Grade 3	Gaston	Roberto Artiagoitía
2009	Super	Ortega	Felipe del Río
2009	Dawson Isla 10	Sergio Bitar	Miguel Littin
2010	Drama	Max	Matías Lira
2015	El bosque de Karadima	Thomas Leyton	Matías Lira
2015	The Memory of Water	Javier	Matías Bize
2015	Baires	Mateo	Marcelo Páez Cubells
2016	El hilo rojo	Manuel	Daniela Goggi
2016	That's Not Cheating	Joaquín Campos	Ariel Winograd
2017	Los padecientes	Pablo Rouviot	
2019	The Moneychanger	Javier Bonpland	
2020	Jailbreak Pact	León Vargas	David Albala
2022	Lie to Me	Julian	Sebastian Schindel
2023	The Lulú Club	Nico	Marcos Carnevale
2023	Matria		Sandra Arriagada
2024	The Silence of Marcos Tremmer	Marcos Tremmer	Miguel García de la Calera
2025	Mensaje en una botella	Tomás Blanco	Gabriel Nesci

=== Television ===
Year	Title	Channel	Character
2000	Vivir al Día	Red Televisión	
2001	Piel Canela	Canal 13	Gabriel Vallejos
2002-2003	Purasangre	TVN	Rafael Callasis
2003	Pecadores	TVN	Herodes Barriga, El Piruja
2003	La vida es una lotería (episode: Pobre Millonario)	TVN	Javier Soto
2004	Destinos Cruzados	TVN	Franco Schiafino
2005-2010	Los Simuladores	Canal 13	Gabriel Medina
2006-2008	Huaiquimán y Tolosa	Canal 13	Richard Tolosa
2007	Héroes	Canal 13	Manuel Rodríguez
2008-2009	Don Juan y su bella dama	Telefe	Franco Ramirez Puente
2010	Los Hombres de Paco (Spain)	Antena 3	Deker
2011-2012	Herederos de una venganza	Argentina	Benicio Echagüe, El Maldito
2011-2013	Prófugos (LatinAmerica)	HBO	Alvaro Parraguez / Tegui
2011-2014	Los archivos del cardenal	TVN	Ramón Sarmiento
2012	La Dueña	Telefe	Félix Fernández
2013-2014	Farsantes	El Trece	Pedro Beggio
2015	Entre caníbales	Telefe	Agustín Larralde
2015-2018	Sitiados	Fox, TVN	Agustín González
2016	2091	Fox	Lodi
2016	Por Fin Solos	TVN	Gonzalo Munoz
2017	Un Diablo Con Ángel	TVN	Gaspar Muñoz
2018	100 Days to Fall in Love	Telefe	Emiliano Iturria
2018-2019	Locked Up	Fox	Antonio Hierro
2019	Argentina, tierra de amor y venganza	El Trece	Torcuato Ferreyra
2019-2020	Berko: el arte de callar	FOX/TVN	Boris Berkowitz
2020	Inés del alma mía	RTVE, Boomerang TV, Chilevisión	Rodrigo de Quiroga
2021	Demente	Mega	Joaquín Acevedo
2021	Terapia alternativa	Star+	Elias
2021	Victoria	Amazon Prime Video	Antonio M.
2022	The First of Us	Telefe	Santiago Luna
2023	La voz ausente †	Star+	Pablo Rouviot
2023	Los mil días de Allende †	El Nueve	Fidel Castro
2023	Limbo 2 †	Star+	

=== Theatre ===
Year	Title	Author	Director	Character	Theater
1998	Antigona		Rodrigo Perez		
1999	Hechos Consumados		Alfredo Castro		Chilean National Theater, Teatro de la Memoria • Santiago, Chile
2000	The Seagull	Anton Chekhov	Erik Lacascade		
2000	Juegos a la hora de la siesta	Roma Mahieu			
2001	El Naranjal	Ramón Griffero	Ramón Griffero		
2001	Top Dogs	Urs Widmer			Teatro del Puente • Santiago, Chile
2001	El lugar común	Alejandro Moreno			
2002	Cueca@	Alejandro Moreno			
2004	Splendid's			Jean	Centro Cultural Matucana 100 • Santiago, Chile
2005	Cooking with Elvis				Centro Mori, Teatro Mori Bellavista • Santiago, Chile
2007	The Lover				Centro Mori, Teatro Mori Parque Arauco • Santiago, Chile
2009	The Big Night				Centro Mori, Teatro Mori Vitacura • Santiago, Chile
2011	The Celebration				Centro Mori, Lola Membrives • Buenos Aires, Argentina
2017	Eva Perón			Eva Perón	Teatro Nacional Cervantes • Buenos Aires, Argentina
2019	Terapia Amorosa			Valentin	Teatro El Picadero • Buenos Aires, Argentina
2022	The Grönholm Method				Sala Pablo Neruda • Buenos Aires, Argentina

=== Music Videos ===
Year	Title	Artist	Ref
2002	I Like	Los Tetas	
2022	Cuando Lo Veo	Pimpinela	
2023	Lloro	Pimpinela	

== Awards and nominations ==
Year	Award	Category	Nominated work	Result	Ref(s)
2002	APES Award	Best Lead Actor - Television	Purasangre	Won	
2003	APES Award	Best Actor - Television	Pecadores	Nominated	
2004	Altazor Award	Best Actor in a Television Series	Pecadores	Nominated	
2005	Copihue de Oro	Best Actor - Television	Los simuladores	Nominated	
2006	Copihue de Oro	Best Actor - Television	Huaiquimán y Tolosa	Nominated	
2006	APES Award	Best Supporting Performance - Television	Huaiquimán y Tolosa	Won	
2006	Trieste Festival of Latin-American Cinema	Best Performance	Fuga	Won	
2006	London Film Festival	Best Actor	Fuga	Won	
2007	Málaga Spanish Film Festival	Favorite Movie Actor	Fuga	Won	
2009	Copihue de Oro	Best Actor - Film		Won	
2009	New York Latin ACE Awards	Cinema - Best Supporting Actor	Chef's Special	Won	
2010	Copihue de Oro	Best Actor - Film		Won	
2011	Copihue de Oro	Best Actor - Television		Nominated	
2012	Martín Fierro Awards	Best Lead Actor in a Miniseries or Telefeature	La dueña	Nominated	
2014	Martín Fierro Awards	Best Lead Actor of Daily Fiction or Soap Opera	Farsantes	Nominated	
2015	Copihue de Oro	Favorite Actor		Nominated	
2016	Martín Fierro Awards	Best Lead Actor of Daily Fiction	Entre caníbales	Nominated	
2019	Notirey Awards	Best Lead Actor of Daily Fiction	Argentina, tierra de amor y venganza	Nominated	
2019	ACE Award	Best Leading Actor in a Comedy	Terapia amorosa	Nominated	
2022	Silver Condor Awards	Best Leading Actor in a Comedy Series	Terapia alternativa	Nominated	
2023	Martín Fierro Awards	Best Lead Actor of Daily Fiction	The First of Us	Won	
