= 100 días para enamorarse (Chilean TV series) =

Chilean telenovela

- Genre: Telenovela
- Created by: Rodrigo Bastidas
- Based on: 100 días para enamorarse by Sebastián Ortega
- Directed by: Enrique Bravo
- Country of origin: Chile
- Original language: Spanish
- No. of seasons: 1
- No. of episodes: 152

Production
- Executive producer: Daniela Demicheli

Original release
- Network: Mega
- Release: 9 December 2019 – 14 March 2021

Related
- 100 días para enamorarnos

100 días para enamorarse is a Chilean telenovela written by Rodrigo Bastidas, from a screenplay by Sebastián Ortega. The series is based on the 2018 Argentine telenovela of the same name produced by Viacom International Studios and broadcast on Telefe. It stars María Elena Swett, Marcelo Alonso, Luz Valdivieso, Diego Muñoz, Fernando Larraín, and Celine Reymond, and it premiered on 9 December 2019, replacing the telenovela Juegos de poder.

== Premise ==
The series revolves around Laura (María Elena Swett) and Antonia (Luz Valdivieso), two great friends who make a pact with their husbands to separate for 100 days, at which time they must follow 10 strict rules and in the end decide if they want to continue together or not. The idea is to show how men and women see life in different ways.

== Cast ==
- María Elena Swett as Laura Domínguez
- Diego Muñoz as Pedro Valdés
- Luz Valdivieso as Antonia Salinas
- Marcelo Alonso as Diego Prieto
- Celine Reymond as Mané Valenzuela
- Sebastián Layseca as Kike Martinez
- Claudia Pérez as Florencia González
- Fernando Larraín as Javier Muñoz
- Felipe Rojas as Pablo Domínguez
- Teresita Commentz as Martina Salinas/Martín Salinas
- Clemente Rodríguez as Clemente Valdés
- Andrea Eltit as Carmen Mujica
- Santiago Díaz as Lucas Valdés
- Valentina Alvear as Julieta Muñoz
- Simón Acuña as Nicolás Muñoz
- Amalia Kassai as Cristina Vicuña
- César Sepúlveda as Andrés García
- Schlomit Baytelman as Lourdes Cotapos
- Gabriel Prieto as Leo Salinas
- Jacqueline Boudon as Raquel Soto
- Catherine Mazoyer as Magdalena Alvear
- María José Bello as Catalina Mardones
- Juan Pablo Sáez as Sebastian Ruiz
- Carolina Paulsen as Alicia, Manu's mother
- Paulo Brunetti as Laura y Pedro's therapist
- Muriel Martin as Tamara Galindo
- Daniela Muñoz as Manu
- Sebastián Arrigorriaga as Joaquín
- Bárbara Ríos as Solange
- Daniel Guillón as Laura's tinder date
- Cristián Alegría as Man in nightclub
- Daniel Elosúa as Man in nightclub
- María José Quiroz as María José Quintana
- Mayte Sarmiento as Sole
- Iñaki Larraín as Borja
- Catalina Vera as Esther
- Julio César Serrano as Bombero, Javier's friend
- Romeo Singer as Arturo
