= The Lulú Club =

- Theatrical release poster
- Spanish: Papá al rescate
- Directed by: Marcos Carnevale
- Written by: Sebastián Freund; Rodrigo Muñoz
- Produced by: Ignacio Rey; Juan Pelosi; Rocío Gort; Sebastián Freund
- Starring: Benjamín Vicuña; Jorge Zabaleta
- Cinematography: Enrique Stindt
- Edited by: Luis Barros
- Music by: Camilo Salinas; Cristián Heyne
- Production companies: Rizoma Films; Frontera Films; Leyenda Films
- Release date: January 5, 2023
- Running time: 100 minutes
- Countries: Chile; Argentina
- Language: Spanish

The Lulú Club (Spanish: Papá al rescate, lit. 'Dad to the rescue') is a 2023 Chilean-Argentine comedy-drama film directed by Marcos Carnevale and written by Sebastián Freund & Rodrigo Muñoz. Starring Benjamín Vicuña and Jorge Zabaleta. It premiered on January 5, 2023, in Chilean theaters.

== Synopsis ==
Just one week before his same-sex wedding, Nico receives a letter that forces him to confront his best-kept secret: he is the father of Lulú, a 7-year-old girl he barely knew at birth. Following her mother's death, Lulú has been living in a home and Nico has just three days to retrieve her before she is put up for adoption. Unsure of what to do, Nico decides to confide in his fiancé and embarks on a journey with his closest friends to rescue Lulú.

== Cast ==
The actors participating in this film are:

- Benjamín Vicuña as Nicolás
- Jorge Zabaleta as Raimundo
- Fernando Larraín as Fernando
- Rodrigo Muñoz as Chico
- Laurita Fernández as Marina
- Johanna Francella as Laura
- Nayaraq Guevara
- Silvina Quintanilla

== Production ==
Principal photography of the film began on March 22, 2022, and ended on April 21 of the same year in Mendoza, Luján de Cuyo, Las Heras, Uspallata and Maipú, Argentina and in Chilean territory.

== Reception ==
In its first month, the film was seen between 200,000 and 250,000 viewers in Chilean theaters, becoming the best Chilean premiere since 2020.
