= Fuga (film) =

2006 Argentine drama film

- Chilean theatrical release poster
- Directed by: Pablo Larraín
- Written by: Mateo Iribarren; Pablo Larraín; Hernán Rodríguez Matte
- Starring: Benjamín Vicuña; Gastón Pauls; Alfredo Castro
- Production company: Fábula
- Release date: 27 March 2006
- Running time: 110 minutes
- Countries: Chile; Argentina
- Language: Spanish

Fuga is a 2006 Chilean-Argentine drama film directed by Pablo Larraín. It is Larraín's directing debut.

== Plot ==
The story follows Eliseo Montalbán (Benjamín Vicuña) and his traumatic childhood experience of witnessing the tragic and horrifying death of his sister on a piano, combined with the accidental creation of a piece of music that he believes carries a curse of death. This traumatic incident shapes Eliseo into a musical prodigy with an obsessive and disturbed personality, particularly fixated on the ominous musical piece.

As he matures, Eliseo eventually composes a masterpiece, a Rhapsody based on the haunting music, which tragically leads to the death of his love interest, the pianist Georgina (Francisca Imboden), moments after she starts performing it at a packed Municipal Theater in Santiago. This event deeply torments Eliseo, and his mental anguish becomes so overwhelming that his father decides to confine him to an asylum, causing Eliseo to fade into obscurity.

Meanwhile, Eliseo remains in seclusion after managing to escape the asylum. Ricardo Coppa (Gastón Pauls) endeavors to retrieve Montalbán's cursed musical composition with the help of a group of musicians. Unaware of the peril they're putting themselves in, they strive to claim the piece as their own.

== Cast ==
- Benjamín Vicuña as Eliseo Montalbán
- Gastón Pauls as Ricardo Coppa
- Francisca Imboden as Georgina
- María Izquierdo as Madre de Eliseo
- Willy Semler as Padre de Eliseo
- Héctor Noguera as Klaus Roth
- Alfredo Castro as Claudio
- Alejandro Trejo as Pacian
- Paulina Urrutia as Macarena
