= Fernando Larraín =

Chilean comedian and actor

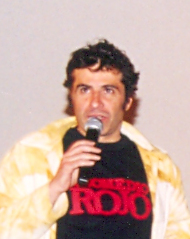
- Larraín in 2004
- Born: Fernando José Larraín de Toro; September 21, 1962 (age 63); Santiago de Chile
- Occupation(s): Actor, comedian, TV presenter
- Children: Celeste Larrain Olivares Iñaki Larrain Olivares Jerónimo Larrain Olivares

Fernando José Larraín de Toro (born September 21, 1962 in Santiago) is a Chilean comedian and film/television actor. He is of Basque descent.

Fernando started his career with the humoristic trio "Fresco y Natural después del postre", along with his brother Nicolás Larraín and Felipe Izquierdo. He also recorded a CD with his musical group called Varella. As a comedian in the 1990s, Fernando appeared in various TV shows as "Bodybuilder" and "CorazonesService" with Felipe Izquierdo. In 1998–2002, he hosted the show "Chile Tuday" (MEGA). Fernando also appeared in some films and comedy shows like "La Nany" (2005–2006) and "Casado con Hijos" (2006–2008), where obtained the main role.

== Filmography ==
Soap Opera, TV Series, Television and Film credits
Year	Title	Role	Notes
1995	Estúpido Cupido	Guillermo Sandoval	Soap Opera
2003	Cesante	Boy Scout / Mobster	Voice; Film
2003	The Chosen One	Andrés	Film
2005-06	La Nany	Bruno Órdenes	Television Series
2006-08	Casado con Hijos	Alberto "Tito" Larraín	Television Series
2007	Fiestapatria	Manuel Eduardo	Film
2011	Ala Chilena	Willy Benavente	Television Series
2012	Aquí Mando Yo	Maximiliano Montenegro	Soap Opera
2019	Hecho bolsa	Alfredo's coworker	Film
2023	The Lulú Club	Fernando	Film
