= 100 días para enamorarnos =

American comedy drama television series

- Genre: Drama
- Created by: Ricardo Álvarez Canales
- Based on: 100 días para enamorarse by Sebastián Ortega
- Developed by: Amaris Páez; Violeta Fonseca
- Directed by: Jorge Colón; Mariano Ardanaz; Fez Noriega
- Creative director: Pedro Larrechea
- Opening theme: "Quiero despertar" by Efecto Mandarina
- Composer: Joaquín Fernández
- Country of origin: United States
- Original language: Spanish
- No. of seasons: 2
- No. of episodes: 92

Production
- Executive producers: Marcos Santana; Miguel Varoni
- Producers: Orangel Lara; Ernesto Cabrera; Elizabeth Suarez
- Production location: Miami, United States
- Cinematography: José Luis Velarde; Gerónimo Denti
- Editors: Ellery Albarrán; Maribel García
- Production company: Telemundo Global Studios

Original release
- Network: Telemundo
- Release: 28 April 2020 – 10 February 2021

Related
- 100 días para enamorarse (2019)

100 días para enamorarnos (English: 100 Days To Fall In Love) is an American comedy drama television series that premiered on Telemundo on 28 April 2020, with 30 minutes of the first episode given a special pre-release online on 21 April 2020. The series is an adaptation of the Argentine telenovela created by Sebastián Ortega titled 100 días para enamorarse, which had a recent Chilean version released in 2019 on Mega with the same name. The series received media attention for LGBTQ characters like Alejandra Rivera who explores romantic feelings for a woman and then embraces his "gender identity." The second season was made available for streaming outside the United States on Netflix and Blim TV on 10 February 2021.

The series stars an ensemble cast headed by Ilse Salas, Mariana Treviño, Erick Elías, and David Chocarro.

== Plot ==
The story revolves around two good friends, Constanza Franco (Ilse Salas), a very sophisticated and successful lawyer, in addition to mother and wife; and to Remedios Rivera (Mariana Treviño), in the shoes of Mariana Treviño, also a loving mother and wife, but who, unlike her friend, is a free spirit who cannot keep her life in order. Both women decide to end 20 years of marriage with their respective husbands. Remedios's life is complicated when she decides to separate from her current husband and her first love reappears. Meanwhile, Constanza agrees with her husband to take a 100-day break. Once the 100 days are up, they will have to decide whether to keep the marriage or not.

== Cast ==
=== Main ===
- Ilse Salas as Constanza Franco
- Mariana Treviño as Remedios Rivera
- Erick Elías as Plutarco Cuesta
- David Chocarro as Emiliano León
- Sylvia Sáenz as Jimena Sosa
- Sofía Lama as Aurora Villareal
- Héctor Suárez Gomís as Luis Casas
- Andrés Almeida as Max Barrios
- Manuel Balbi as Fernando Barroso
- Lucas Velásquez as Pablo Franco
- Daniela Bascopé as Isabel Morales
- Macarena García as Alejandra Rivera
- Xabiani Ponce de León as Daniel Cuesta
- Gabriel Tarantini as Benjamín Flores
- Fernanda Urdapilleta as Lucía Sandoval Blanco
- Sheryl Rubio as Mariana Velarde
- Macaria as Mónica Franco
- Eduardo Ibarrola as Pedro Franco
- Shaula Vega as Marlene Blanco
- Beatriz Monroy as Vicky Medina
- Thamara Aguilar as Teresa "Tere" Medina
- Isabella Sierra as Susana Casas Sosa
- Gael Sánchez as Marín Cuesta
- Andrés Pirela as Nicolás "Nico" Casas Villareal
- Humberto Zurita as Ramiro Rivera

=== Guest stars ===
- Scarlet Ortiz as Gloria
- Carlos Torres as Fabián "Lobo" Ramírez
- Fabián Ríos as Iván Acosta

== Production ==
The show is produced by Telemundo Global Studios and filming in Miami, United States. The production of the series was officially confirmed on 23 October 2019. On 18 March 2020, Telemundo suspended production of the telenovela temporarily due to the COVID-19 pandemic in the United States. Filming resumed on 6 July 2020, and concluded on 31 July 2020.

== Episodes ==
=== Series overview ===
Series	Episodes	Originally released	
Series	Episodes	First released	Last released
1	57	28 April 2020	20 July 2020
2	35	10 February 2021	

=== Season 1 (2020) ===
No. overall	No. in season	Title	Original release date	US viewers (millions)
1	1	"Parejas en crisis"	28 April 2020	1.07
The marriage between Constanza and Plutarco does not go well at all. Jealousy triggers a discussion that forces them to replace their relationship, just on the day of their 18th anniversary.
2	2	"El insólito acuerdo"	29 April 2020	1.00
Constanza and Plutarco review the points of the pact and another discussion breaks out, when he ventilates the crisis in the office. Like a losing streak, divorce also affects Remedios and Max.
3	3	"Plutarco estrena su libertad"	30 April 2020	0.99
Plutarco follows the advice of his friend Emiliano: enjoy 100 days in the honeys of freedom. Gloria made her divorce in Cuesta's office. She is ready for a new relationship.
4	4	"En la gloria"	1 May 2020	0.80
Gloria and Plutarco have a romantic date in which everything seems to be on rails. A good wine accompanies the evening, but unexpectedly, someone knocks on the door. A storm is coming.
5	5	"El turno es de Constanza"	4 May 2020	0.93
Constanza and Plutarco are separated, but professionally they are still together. They go to court and Roger Montero appears, a prominent and handsome journalist with whom he has an appointment.
6	6	"La dura competencia"	5 May 2020	0.91
Roger Montero is not only a good candidate for Constanza, he is also an exceptional source of information to win a case. Plutarch bursts out of jealousy. Remedios reveals his most precious secret.
7	7	"Efecto tequila"	6 May 2020	0.93
Remedios has Constanza as a lawyer. The friends are celebrating and they vent their sorrows with tequila. They don't know what they say or what they do. Plutarco and Emiliano go to the rescue.
8	8	"La apuesta de Sol"	7 May 2020	0.84
Plutarco Cuesta has an appointment and a plan to run away from Jimena's birthday party, to see Sol. While she flirts with her son Daniel, he looks for an excuse to go out.
9	9	"La cuesta del amor"	8 May 2020	0.78
Plutarco has his way. The night is young and Sol asks him to surprise her. Daniel, his son can't take it anymore, curiosity kills him. Uncle Emiliano gives him advice to conquer a woman.
10	10	"El imperio de los machos"	11 May 2020	0.93
Plutarco and Constanza do not forget their role as parents and help Daniel to conquer the girl of his dreams. Nicolás and a costume set off alarms in Luis' double life. Jimena suspects.
11	11	"Los tiempos cambian"	12 May 2020	0.89
Constanza and Plutarco are forced to adapt, if they want to survive the 100-day pact. They give themselves the opportunity to be with someone else and the experience is somewhat complicated.
12	12	"Amor cibernético"	13 May 2020	0.84
Plutarco creates a fake profile on the internet. Her strategy is to get information out of Constanza, get close to her again and discover what she is looking for as a woman.
13	13	"Telaraña de mentiras"	14 May 2020	0.92
Daniel invites Sol home and the roles are reversed. The young man demands that his parents behave. It is the first family dinner, questions arise and Plutarco suffers the most.
14	14	"Infiel a la vista"	15 May 2020	0.80
Lies have short legs. Luis' double life is at stake. An outing with Aurora and Nicolas could expose him. Jimena is in the same place. Fear takes hold of him.
15	15	"Capricho"	18 May 2020	0.89
16	16	"Del amor a la locura"	19 May 2020	0.89
17	17	"Adiós al pacto"	20 May 2020	0.83
18	18	"No hay vuelta atrás"	21 May 2020	0.88
19	19	"Impulsos del corazón"	22 May 2020	0.67
20	20	"La vida loca en Miami"	25 May 2020	0.78
21	21	"Cara o sello"	26 May 2020	0.79
22	22	"El caso más difícil"	27 May 2020	0.81
23	23	"El viejo truco de la seducción"	28 May 2020	0.79
24	24	"Lobo puede con todas"	29 May 2020	0.72
25	25	"Partidazo"	1 June 2020	0.80
26	26	"Gallitos de pelea"	2 June 2020	0.92
27	27	"Triángulos amorosos"	3 June 2020	0.89
28	28	"Toma y dame"	4 June 2020	0.91
29	29	"La fiesta inolvidable"	5 June 2020	0.83
30	30	"Como lobo a su presa"	8 June 2020	0.91
31	31	"Plutarco al bate"	9 June 2020	0.92
32	32	"Por los viejos tiempos"	10 June 2020	0.85
33	33	"Dos hombres para una cita"	11 June 2020	0.87
34	34	"Los 100 días de Luis"	12 June 2020	0.65
35	35	"Los cómplices están de fiesta"	15 June 2020	0.82
36	36	"Sin el pan y sin la torta"	16 June 2020	0.79
37	37	"El pretexto"	17 June 2020	0.81
38	38	"Sorpresas te da la vida"	18 June 2020	0.83
39	39	"Constanza va por más"	19 June 2020	0.69
40	40	"Acorralado"	22 June 2020	0.87
41	41	"Soy Alex"	23 June 2020	0.85
42	42	"El coraje de todos"	24 June 2020	0.85
43	43	"El ataque"	25 June 2020	0.81
44	44	"No hay dos sin tres"	26 June 2020	0.63
45	45	"Inoportunos"	29 June 2020	0.84
46	46	"El cuarto poder"	30 June 2020	0.81
47	47	"Ofalto de sabuesos"	1 July 2020	0.91
48	48	"Un corazón para dos"	2 July 2020	0.75
49	49	"Una bomba a punto de explotar"	6 July 2020	0.81
50	50	"Un coqueteo picante"	7 July 2020	0.79
51	51	"Sin palabras"	8 July 2020	0.74
52	52	"Cenizas de amor"	9 July 2020	0.83
53	53	"El otro pacto"	13 July 2020	0.76
54	54	"Espejismos"	14 July 2020	0.88
55	55	"La metida de pata"	15 July 2020	0.75
56	56	"Como abeja a la miel"	16 July 2020	0.73
57	57	"A 50 días del acuerdo"	20 July 2020	0.96

=== Season 2 (2021) ===
No. overall	No. in season	Title	Original release date
58	1	"No te he olvidado"	10 February 2021
59	2	"Dos contra dos"	10 February 2021
60	3	"Deseos sin control"	10 February 2021
61	4	"Casados con secretos"	10 February 2021
62	5	"Plutarco pica adelante"	10 February 2021
63	6	"El torbellino Iván"	10 February 2021
64	7	"La madrina alcahueta"	10 February 2021
65	8	"No hay marcha atrás"	10 February 2021
66	9	"El límite es el cielo"	10 February 2021
67	10	"Rebeldes en fuga"	10 February 2021
68	11	"Abre los ojos"	10 February 2021
69	12	"Cómplices"	10 February 2021
70	13	"Mentira piadosa"	10 February 2021
71	14	"Renovación"	10 February 2021
72	15	"34 días de libertad"	10 February 2021
73	16	"Éxtasis"	10 February 2021
74	17	"Huele a peligro"	10 February 2021
75	18	"Hay gato encerrado"	10 February 2021
76	19	"La ocasión hace al ladrón"	10 February 2021
77	20	"Ojos que no ven"	10 February 2021
78	21	"Sorpresas te da la vida"	10 February 2021
79	22	"Vientos huracanados"	10 February 2021
80	23	"Al enemigo de cerca"	10 February 2021
81	24	"A toda marcha"	10 February 2021
82	25	"Socios y rivales"	10 February 2021
83	26	"No te rindas"	10 February 2021
84	27	"La prueba de la infidelidad"	10 February 2021
85	28	"Ella o yo"	10 February 2021
86	29	"A un paso de cumplir el pacto"	10 February 2021
87	30	"Declaración de guerra"	10 February 2021
88	31	"Tu casa también es mía"	10 February 2021
89	32	"La gran noticia"	10 February 2021
90	33	"La venganza de Elisa"	10 February 2021
91	34	"Constanza se desquita"	10 February 2021
92	35	"Mensaje emotivo"	10 February 2021

== Reception ==
=== Ratings ===
Viewership and ratings per season of 100 días para enamorarnos
Season	Timeslot (ET)	Episodes	First aired		Last aired		Avg. viewers (millions)
Season	Timeslot (ET)	Episodes	Date	Viewers (millions)	Date	Viewers (millions)	Avg. viewers (millions)
1	Mon–Fri 9:00 p.m.	57	28 April 2020	1.07	20 July 2020	0.96	0.84

=== Awards and nominations ===
Year	Award	Category	Nominated	Result	Ref
2020	Produ Awards	Best Telenovela	100 días para enamorarnos	Won	
2020	Produ Awards	Best Music Theme	"Quiero despertar" by Efecto Mandarina	Nominated	
2020	Produ Awards	Best Writer	Sebastián Ortega and Ricardo Álvarez Canales	Nominated	
2020	Produ Awards	Best Lead Actress	Mariana Treviño	Won	
2020	Produ Awards	Best Newcomer Actress	Macarena García	Nominated	
2020	Produ Awards	Best Newcomer Actor	Gael Sánchez	Nominated	
2021	Produ Awards	Best Lead Actress - Superseries or Telenovela	Ilse Salas	Nominated	
2021	Produ Awards	Best Supporting Actor - Superseries or Telenovela	Héctor Suárez Gomís	Nominated	
2021	Produ Awards	Best Supporting Actress - Superseries or Telenovela	Macarena García	Won	
