= Caleuche Awards =

Acting awards presented in Chile

- Awarded for: Actors and actresses in film and television
- Date: 25 January 2016
- Country: Chile
- Presented by: Corporation of Actors of Chile (Chileactores)
- Website: chileactores.cl

Television/radio coverage
- Network: CNN Chile (2016-2021); La Red (2022); TVN (2023)

The Caleuche Awards (Spanish: Premios Caleuche) is an awards ceremony presented to recognize the best in performances of the season, in feature films, television serials, miniseries and anthology series, and comedy. They were created and organized by the Corporation of Actors of Chile (Chileactores), sponsored by VTR for their first edition.

The first awards ceremony was held on 25 January 2016 at the Teatro Nescafé de las Artes in Santiago. It was hosted by Chilean actor Alejandro Trejo and was broadcast by CNN Chile and Radio Bío-Bío, in television and radio, respectively

== Background ==
The Caleuche Awards are the first Chilean awards ceremony destined to recognize mainly acting performances. Previously, the Altazor Awards were presented from 2000 to 2014 to reward the best in Chilean visual arts, theater, dance, music, cinema and television. These awards included categories for Best Actor and Best Actress, in film, television and theater. During the runtime of the awards, Chileactores was one of the institutions involved in the organization of said awards. On the other hand, the Pedro Sienna Awards were presented regularly from 2006 to 2017. They were presented to award the best in Chilean cinema and also included performance categories, both leading and supporting.

The awards were created in 2016 by Chileactores through their foundation Fundación Gestión (Gestionarte) under the name "Premios Caleuche, Gente que se transforma" (Caleuche Awards, People that transform). The awards name and subtitle make reference to the transformations that actors make for their work and comes from the Caleuche, a ghost ship from Chilote mythology whose name means "transformed people" in Mapudungun.

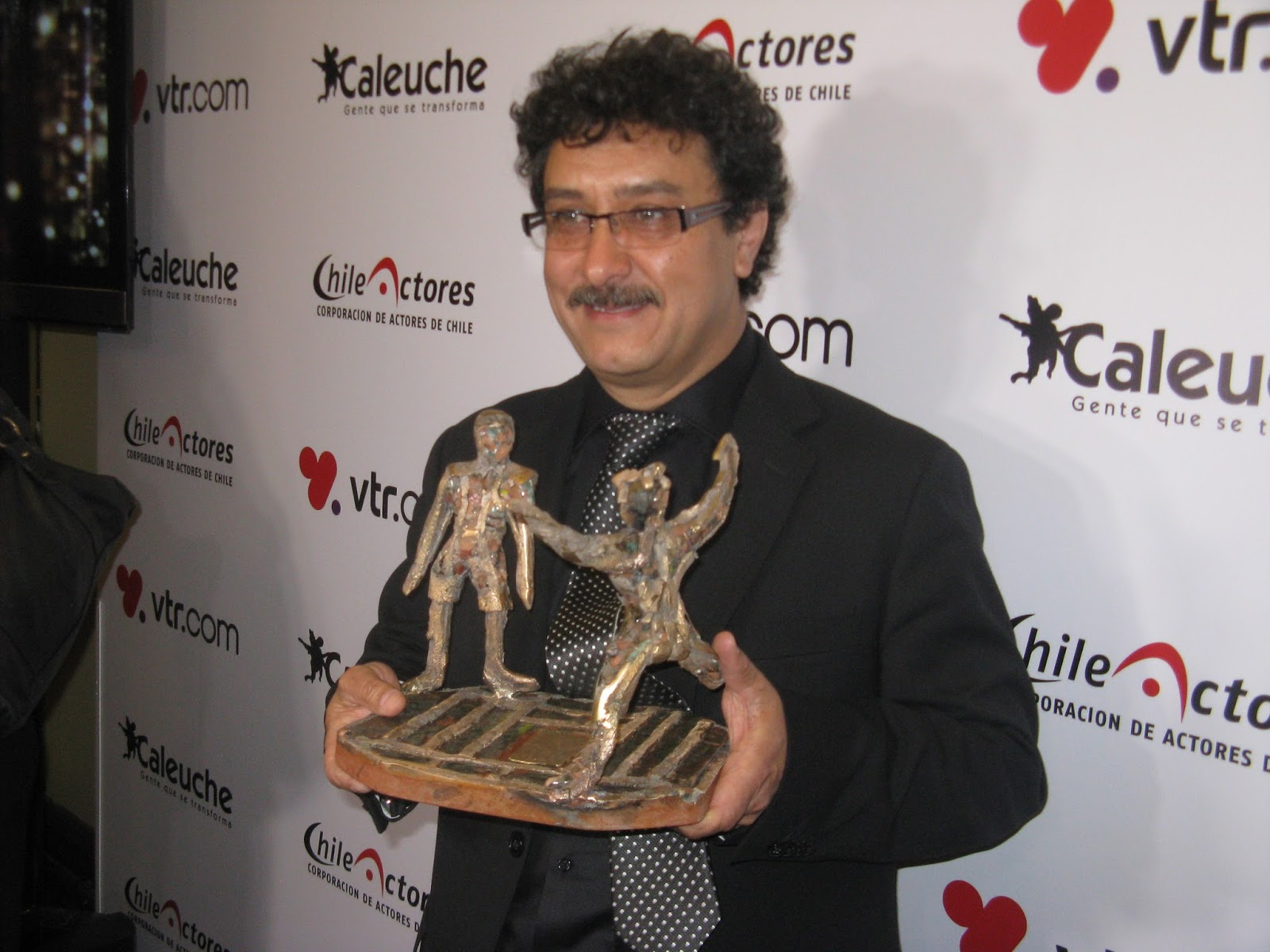

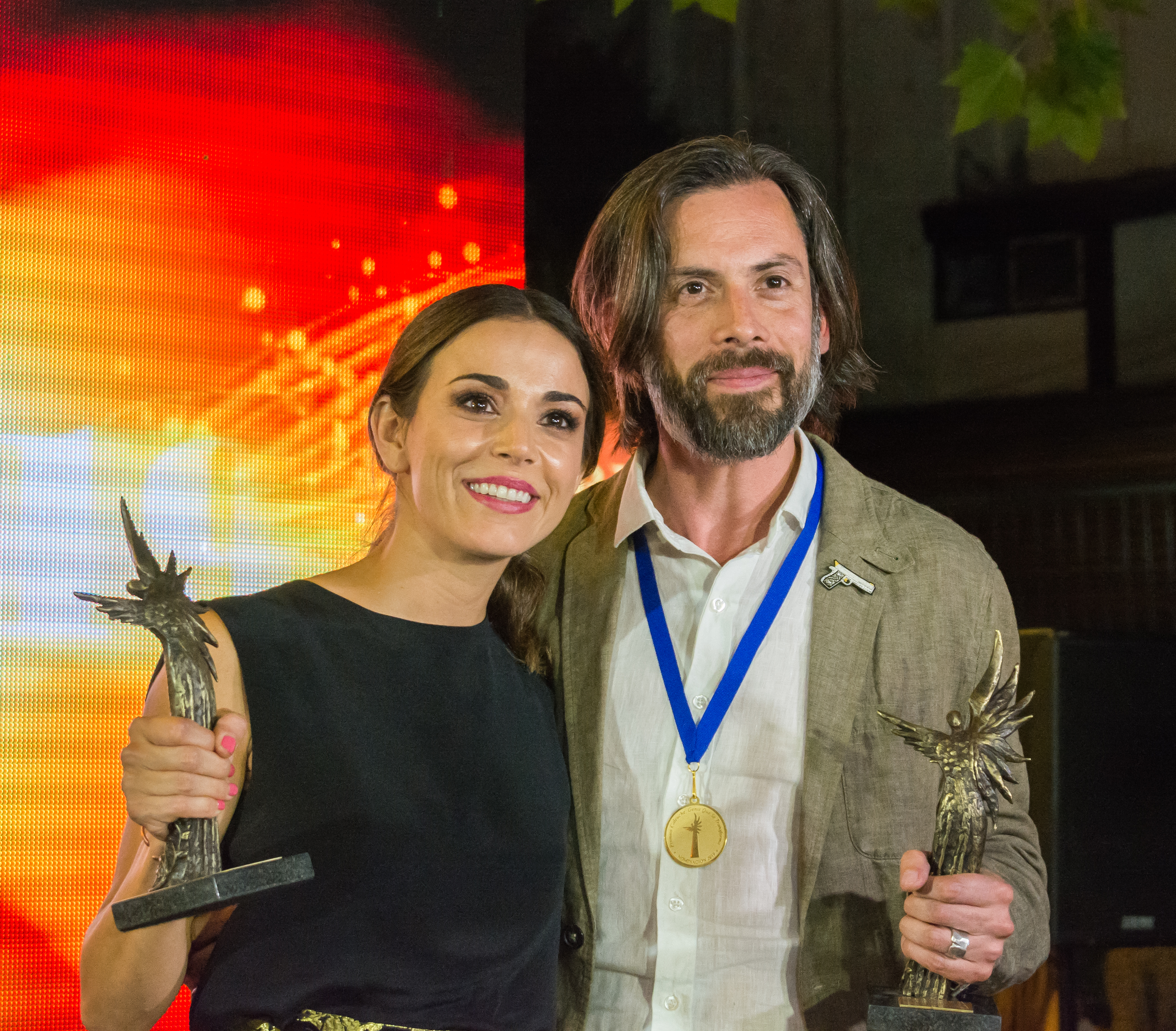
Actor Otilio Castro (top) holding the trophy for the first edition. Actors Ignacia Baeza and Nestor Cantillana (bottom) with the current trophy.

For the first edition of the awards, fourteen categories were presented, consisting of twelve competitive categories divided between three sections (feature films, television series and miniseries/anthology series) plus two special awards (Lifetime Achievement Award and Breakthrough Award). In 2017, the Audience Award was introduced. The following year, the Best Comedian category was created. Said category has recognized both performances in comedic programs and Stand-up comedy routines in televised events such as Teletón and the Viña del Mar International Song Festival.

== Jury ==
The awards process is divided in two phases. Prior to the first phase, a set of juries is determined, composed of eleven industry professionals (actors, film directors, television directors, screenwriters, journalists and critics) for each section (feature films, television series and miniseries/anthology series), which change for each edition of the awards. During the first phase, the juries vote for the nominees while during the second phase, all the associate members of Chileactores vote for the winners.

For the special awards, both the Lifetime Achievement Award and the Breakthrough Award are determined by members of a council in Chileactores, while the Audience Award is chosen via popular vote through the awards website.

== Trophy ==
For the first awards edition, Chilean sculptor Palolo Valdés designed fourteen unique bronze statuettes, inspired by the expressiveness of the body of an actor.

Since the second edition, the trophy is a bronze statuette, designed by Chilean sculptor and ceramist Eugenia González, which represents "a genderless winged being that can transform into a thousand characters and species".

== Categories ==
As of 2023, sixteen categories are presented, including thirteen competitive awards and three special awards:

Feature Film

- Best Leading Actor
- Best Leading Actress
- Best Supporting Actor
- Best Supporting Actress

Television Serials

- Best Leading Actor
- Best Leading Actress
- Best Supporting Actor
- Best Supporting Actress

Miniseries/Anthology Series

- Best Leading Actor
- Best Leading Actress
- Best Supporting Actor
- Best Supporting Actress

Comedy

- Best Comedian (since 2018)

Special Awards

- Lifetime Achievement Award
- Breakthrough Award
- Audience Award (since 2017)

== Ceremonies ==
Year	Date	Venue	City	Host	Broadcast		Ref.
Year	Date	Venue	City	Host	Television	Radio	Ref.
1st	25 January 2016	Teatro Nescafé de las Artes	Santiago	(Chile) Alejandro Trejo	CNN Chile	Radio Bío-Bío	
2nd	24 January 2017	Teatro Oriente	Santiago	(Chile) Fernando Godoy	CNN Chile	Radio Bío-Bío	
3rd	23 January 2018	Teatro Oriente	Santiago	(Chile) Javiera Contador	CNN Chile	Radio Bío-Bío	
4th	22 January 2019	Teatro Oriente	Santiago	(Chile) Javiera Contador	CNN Chile	Radio Bío-Bío	
5th	29 January 2021	Virtual	Santiago	(Chile) Natalia Valdebenito	CNN Chile	Radio Bío-Bío	
6th	21 March 2022	Teatro Oriente	Santiago	(Chile) Javiera Contador	La Red	Radio ADN	
7th	29 January 2023	Teatro Oriente	Santiago	(Chile) Javiera Contador	TVN	Radio ADN	
8th	28 January 2024	Teatro Oriente	Santiago	(Chile) Javiera Contador	TVN	Radio ADN	

== See also ==
- Altazor Award
- Pedro Sienna Awards
- Latin American television awards
