= Centro Mori =

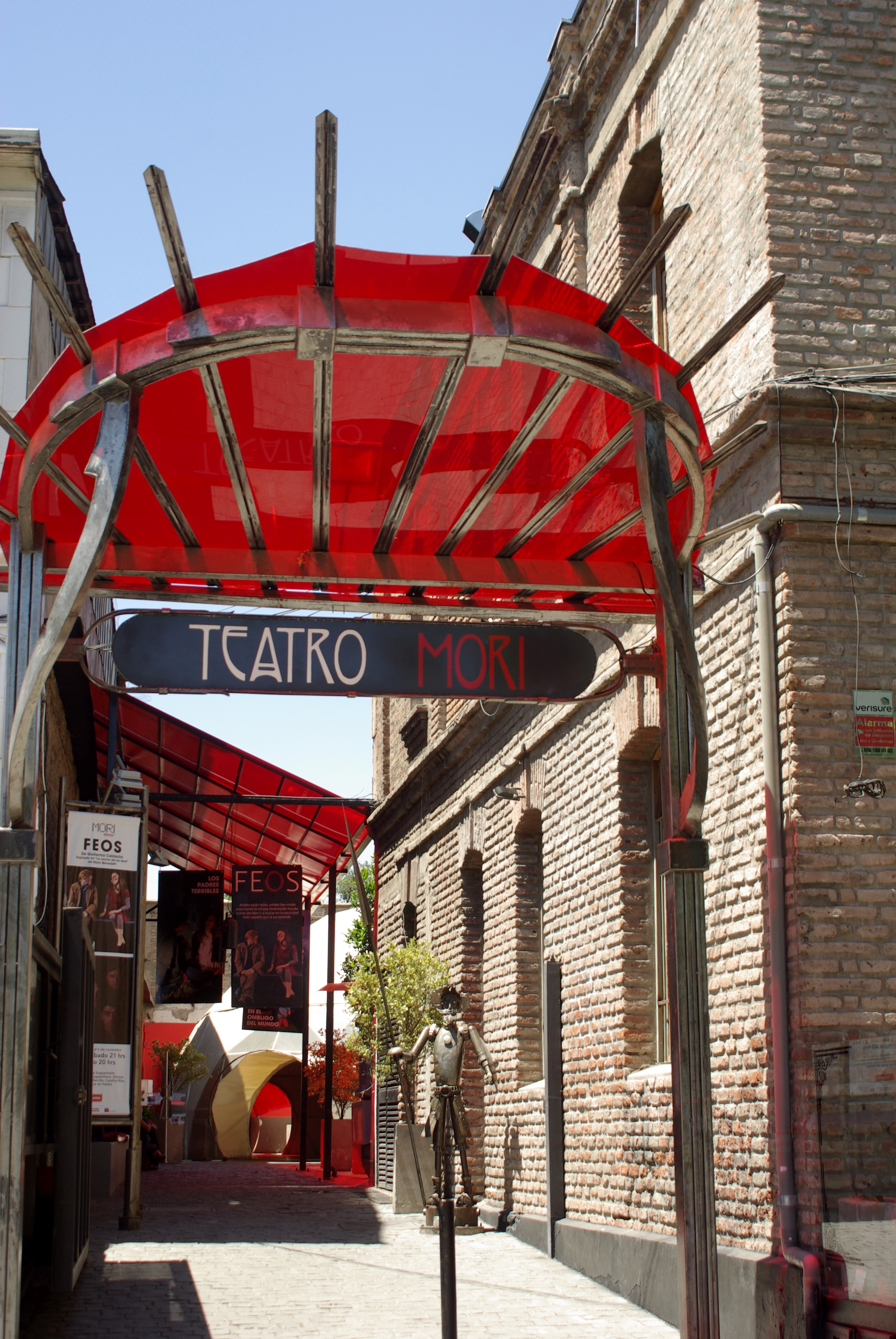
Centro Mori

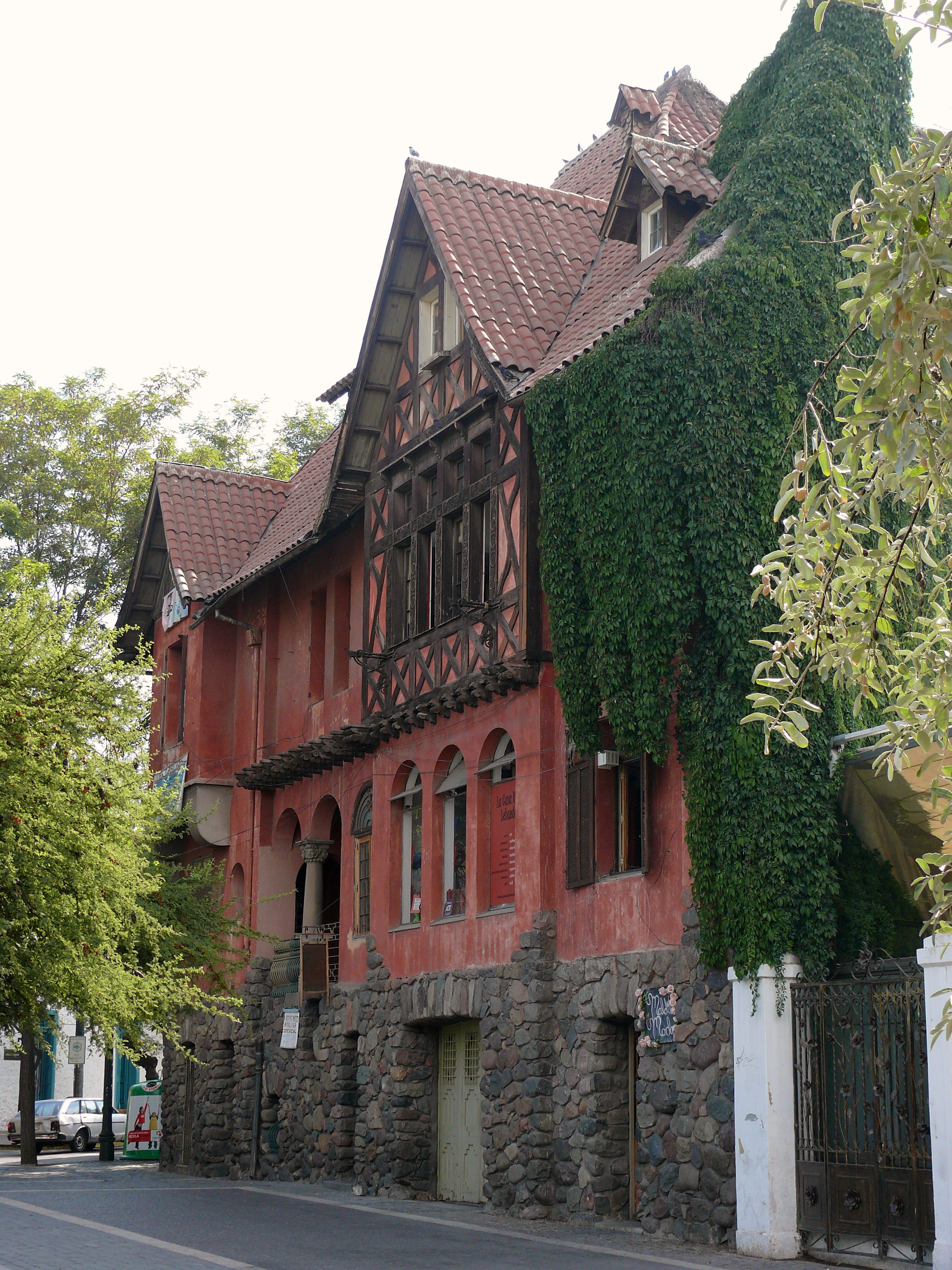
Plaza Camilo Mori 01

The Centro Mori or Centro Cultural Mori (Mori Cultural Center) is a cultural project founded in Santiago, Chile by actors Gonzalo Valenzuela and Benjamín Vicuña, together with their partner Cristóbal Vial. The center is located in Barrio Bellavista - a neighborhood of Santiago with a strong cultural heritage - in an old house at the foot of San Cristóbal Hill (street address Constitución 183), next to the Plaza Camilo Mori and near La Chascona (the museum and former house of Pablo Neruda). The property was restored in 2005 by the actors and a group of professionals to turn it into the Teatro Mori Bellavista (Mori Theater, Bellavista).

Centro Mori runs theater performances in three spaces located around Santiago. The latest to open was the Mori Plaza Vespucio, inaugurated in 2012. At its opening, Valenzuela said “we want to do away with the idea that the theater is elitist, instead showing that it can be a place where people can come and have fun.”

A wide range of theater styles are represented on the center's bill, including a play commemorating victims of the 2010 San Miguel prison fire which opened in August 2012, a theater adaptation of Charlie Chaplin's 1931 film City Lights shown during September 2012 and various works for both children and adults.

== Performance Spaces ==
- Teatro Mori Bellavista – Providencia, Santiago.
- Teatro Mori Parque Arauco – Las Condes, Santiago.
- Teatro Mori Plaza Vespucio – La Florida, Santiago.

== Team ==
- Founding partners: Gonzalo Valenzuela, Cristóbal Vial and Benjamín Vicuña.
- Executive Director: Cristóbal Vial.
- Director of Programming: Andrea Pérez de Castro.
- Press and Events Coordinator: Eloísa Ganderats.
- Journalist and events assistant: Alejandra Calcagni.
- Production and events assistant: Karina Haller.
- Managing Director Theater: Pierangelo Bertolini.
