= Alejandra Herrera (actress) =

Chilean actor (born 1971)

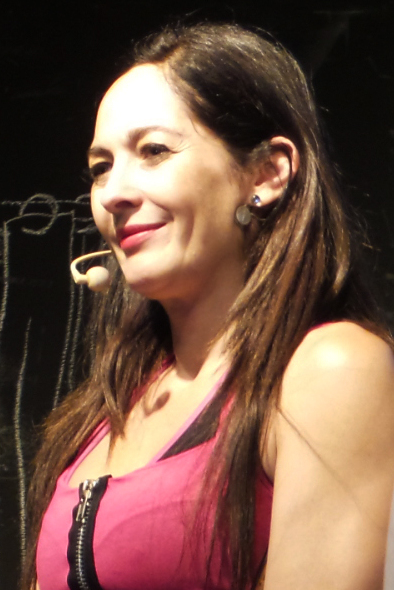
- Herrera in 2016
- Born: María Alejandra Herrera Andreucci; May 14, 1971 (age 54); Santiago, Chile
- Occupation: Actress

María Alejandra Herrera Andreucci (Santiago, May 14, 1971) is a Chilean actress known mainly for starring in the telenovelas Amor a domicilio, Adrenalina and Marparaíso on Canal 13, and in La Nany on Mega.

She graduated from the School of Theater of the University of Chile in 1994, she debuted in teleseries the following year in Amor a domicilio on Channel 13.

She starred in the Chilean adaptations of the series La Nany on Mega and Ana y los Siete on Chilevisión.

Her debut in the cinema was with the film Los Turistas All Inclusive in 2020.

In September 2021, she made her candidacy official for Deputy of District 10 for the Communes: La Granja, Macul, Ñuñoa, Providencia, San Joaquín and Santiago of the United Central Party of Chile

== Filmography ==
=== Telenovelas ===
Telenovelas
Year	Teleserie	Character	Channel	Role
1995	Amor a domicilio	Angélica Díaz	Canal 13	Protagonista
1996	Adrenalina	Alexis Opazo	Canal 13	Antagonista
1997	Playa salvaje	Deborah Meneses / Fernanda Solar	Canal 13	Coprotagonista
1998	Marparaíso	Camila Hidalgo	Canal 13	Protagonista
1999	Cerro Alegre	Carmen Mancilla	Canal 13	Secundario
2001	Corazón pirata	Siboney Mora	Canal 13	Antagonista
2006	Charly Tango	Dayana Mateluna	Canal 13	Coprotagonista
2009	Sin anestesia	Araceli Márquez	Chilevisión	Coprotagonista
2011	Decibel 110	Irene Torrejón	Mega	Coprotagonista
2012	La sexóloga	Estefanía Saavedra	Chilevisión	Participación especial

=== TV Series ===
Series
Year	Serie	Character	Channel
1996	Amor a domicilio, la comedia	Angélica Díaz	Canal 13
2004–2006	BKN	Carolina	Mega
2005	La Nany	Eliana Tapia "La Nany"	Mega
2008	Ana y los siete	Ana Muñoz	Chilevisión
2013–14	Lo que callamos las mujeres	Margarita / Carmen Luz	Chilevisión
2015	Los años dorados	Yasna "Novia de Genaro"	UCV
2015	Código Rosa	Susana	Mega
2017	Irreversible	Ivette	Canal 13
