= Casado con hijos (Chilean TV series) =

Chilean television series

- Genre: Sitcom
- Created by: Ron Leavitt; Michael G. Moye
- Written by: Luz Croxatto; Luis Ponce; Gonzalo Losada; Hernan Rodriguez Matte
- Directed by: Diego Rouger
- Starring: Fernando Larraín; Javiera Contador; Fernando Godoy; Dayana Amigo; Marcial Tagle; Carmen Gloria Bresky
- Country of origin: Chile
- Original language: Spanish
- No. of seasons: 4
- No. of episodes: 259

Production
- Executive producers: J.J. Harting; Ignacio Eysaguirre; Jimena Oto Carbonell
- Producers: J.J. Harting; Ignacio Eysaguirre
- Production location: Roos Film Studios
- Running time: approximately 40 minutes

Original release
- Network: Mega
- Release: October 15, 2008

Casado con hijos is a Chilean television series and remake of the American television series Married... with Children. It aired on May 2, 2006, and ended on October 15, 2008. It airs on post-time schedule (after 1:00 a.m.).

It was produced by Roos Film and Sony Pictures Television International and aired on the Chilean channel Megavisión. Its running time was about thirty to forty minutes. It had four seasons.

Casado con hijos was the most-watched sitcom in the history of Chilean television; some of its episodes reached more than 40 points of rating.

== Synopsis ==
The Larrains are a Chilean family. They watch television all day and have no hope of social mobility.

Tito met his wife, Quena, (a Coihueco native) when they were in high school. Quena became pregnant and had no choice but to marry Tito. Tito is a hooligan of the soccer team Unión Española, just like Fernando Larraín, the actor who portrays him.

Tito's family used to have a lot of money but lost everything on the economic crisis of 1982. His family left the country, and Tito stayed in Chile by himself. He never got into college because he had no money. He looked for a job and could find only a position as a salesman in a women's shoe shop, in a mall in Downtown Santiago called El Conde del Calzado. After 19 years of marriage, he still has that job.

== Series overview ==
| Season | Episodes | Originally aired | |
| Season | Episodes | First | Last |
|---|---|---|---|
| 1 | 75 | May 1, 2006 | September 8, 2006 |
| 2 | 63 | October 2, 2006 | January 26, 2007 |
| 3 | 100 | March 12, 2007 | July 26, 2007 |
| 4 | 26 | July 16, 2008 | October 15, 2008 |

=== First season ===
The First season Casado con hijos (Married with children) began on Tuesday, May 2, 2006, replacing Mr. Bean, and ended on Friday, September 29 of that year.

In adaptation, originally completed with only 25 chapters distributed Monday through Friday, but due to the success of the series in Chile, screenwriters and producers decided to make a Second Season.

=== Second season ===
The Second season or simply Casado con Hijos 2 (Married with children 2) began on Monday, October 2, 2006 and ended on Friday, January 26, 2007. It is set one year after the ending of the last season, which is why the protagonists of the series have changed "looks" (except Tito Larrain, who looks the same).

=== Third season ===
On Monday, March 12, 2007 began Casado con hijos 3 (Married with children 3), the third season. The family changed their look again. The neighbours had a baby, Larrain had a new car, a 15-inch flat TV, and had a dog instead of a parrot.

=== Fourth season ===
The fourth season of Casado con hijos (Married with children) is called: Casado con hijos: Estelar (Married with children: Stellar) and began broadcasting from Wednesday, July 16, 2008, in primetime at 22:00 hrs. The premiere of this season was successful, because it had an excellent following, being first of its schedule. The plot of this season is in the first leg of Tito's house to dedicate himself to music, which leads to a family breakdown.

== Characters ==
- Alberto "Tito" Larraín (Fernando Larraín): Tito likes beer and soccer and loves putting his right hand between his legs when sitting on his favorite sofa. He is harsh and often lies and is not very affectionate with his family. He has been working at a job that he loathes for almost 20 years
- María Eugenia "Quena" Gómez de Larraín (Javiera Contador): Quena is the careless mother of the family. She has been married to Tito for 19 years and is the mother of Nacho and Titi. Quena has never cooked, washed clothes or kept the house clean. She would rather buy new clothes on sale than wash clothes she already has. She wears bright, attractive colours; tight outfits; and low-cut shirts.
- Ignacio "Nacho" Larraín Gómez (Fernando Godoy): Nacho is the youngest son of the family. He is the smartest member of his family and has good grades at school. He is unpopular with women because of his lack of charm and unappealing looks. His family often mocks him for this and for being a “mama's boy.” The character is popular for his peculiar “baile del limpiaparabrisas”(windshield wiper dance).
- María Fernanda "Titi" Larraín Gómez (Dayana Amigo): Titi is 19 but has the maturity of a 13 year old and the reading ability of a 6 year old. She is the most attractive family member and is very foolish and naive. She has many boyfriends during the series, sometimes several at once. Her father is very protective of her and affectionately calls her Polillita (Little Moth).

=== Neighbours ===
- Marcia Durán (Carmen Gloria Bresky): Marcia is a neighbor and good friend of Quena’s. She is egocentric and considers herself superior because of her financial management job. She has strong feminist ideas and often argues with Tito for being sexist. She is very hysterical and controlling and has sudden fits of rage toward her husband, whom she regularly abuses verbally and physically.
- Pablo Pinto (Marcial Tagle): Pablo is Marcia's husband. Because he is very submissive, Tito tries to influence him, inviting him to bars and soccer games. Tito calls him "Marcio" because of the control his wife has over him. During the first season, Pablo is very shy and correct; but in the second season, he becomes vain and extroverted after a trip to Ibiza. He also gets a strong Spanish accent.
- Norma Pons (Renata Bravo): Neighbor of the family during the third season, she went to school with Quena and is now a real estate agent. She's an independent woman, although also a gossip and vicious person, she complains about the Larraín's low education and impoliteness. The Larraín's, on the other hand, make fun of her for being an old maid.

=== Pets ===
- Paco: The family parrot, Quena is the one to look after him. It lasted until the second season because he died.
- Campeón: Champion in Spanish. The family dog that appears in the third season. He's a mongrel, but the seller told Quena the dog was a German shepherd.

=== Job ===
- Luis "Lucho" (Jaime Omeñaca): He is Tito's co-worker, and a good friend of him. Lucho is a womanizer who lives with his mother, who naively believes he's a virgin.
- Bárbara Correa (Josefina Velasco): She is Tito and Lucho's boss, she is very strict, and constantly undermines and looks down on Tito. In one episode, she fell in love with Nacho.

== Song ==
Soy casado, casado con hijos
Ni lo sueñes, es mucho el sacrificio
A mi esposa, la mandaría a trabajar

Y aunque me pase todo el día en la zapatería
Todo el dinero lo gasta mi familia
Soy casado, casado con hijos
No me envidien por favor
No me envidien

Translation into English:

I am married, married with children
Don't even dream it, it takes much sacrifice
I'd send my wife off to work
And though I spend all day at the shoe shop
All the money is spent by my family
I am married, married with children
Do not envy me, please
Do not envy me
