= 20th Santiago International Film Festival =

2024 film festival

- Official poster.
- Location: Santiago, Chile
- Awards: Best Film: State of Silence; Best Chilean Film: The Fabulous Gold Harvesting Machine & Aullido de Invierno
- Directors: Carlos Núñez
- Festival date: August 18–25, 2024

Santiago International Film Festival
- 2025 2023

The 20th Santiago International Film Festival (SANFIC), organized by Fundación CorpArtes, took place from August 18 to 25, 2024.

Mexican documentary State of Silence by Santiago Maza won the Best Film award of the International Competition, while the documentary The Fabulous Gold Harvesting Machine by Alfredo Pourailly De La Plaza and the drama film Aullido de Invierno by Matías Rojas Valencia shared the Best Film award of the Chilean Film Competition.

== Background ==
The lineup for the Chilean film competition was revealed on July 17, while the remaining films were announced on August 13. During the festival's opening ceremony at Teatro CorpArtes, Chilean directors Pablo Larraín, Sebastián Lelio, and Maite Alberdi, were honored with the Trayectory Award for their directing achievements and presence within the international film industry. All three directors have been nominated at the Academy Awards. Larraín's No was Chile's first nomination for the Academy Award for Best International Feature Film, while Lelio's A Fantastic Woman was Chile's first win in the category. Furthermore, Alberdi's The Mole Agent and The Eternal Memory were nominated for the Academy Award for Best Documentary Feature Film.

The festival was directed by Carlos Núñez. Screenings took place at six venues: Sala Centro Arte Alameda, Centro Cultural CEINA, Cinépolis La Reina (La Reina), Cinépolis Mall Plaza Los Dominicos (Las Condes), Cinépolis Vivo Imperio, and Cineteca Nacional de Chile.

== Juries ==
=== International Competition ===
- Adrián Solar; Chilean film producer
- Ilda Santiago; Co-founder and programme director of the Rio de Janeiro International Film Festival
- Javier García Puerto; Director of the Tallinn Black Nights Film Festival

=== Chilean Film Competition ===
- Timm Kröger; German film director and screenwriter
- Santiago Maza; Mexican documentary filmmaker
- Lux Croxatto; Chilean actress and screenwriter

=== Chilean Short Film Competition ===
- Viviana Saavedra; Bolivian film producer, director and president of Red Iberoamericana de Laboratorios de Cine and Bolivia Lab
- Pavel Cortés; director of the Guadalajara International Film Festival
- J.G. Biggs; Chilean film director

== Official selections ==
The following films were selected for the official competitions and other sections:

=== International Film Competition ===
Highlighted title indicates section's best film winner.

English title	Original title	Director(s)	Production countrie(s)
The Universal Theory	Die Theorie von Allem	Timm Kröger	Germany
Simon of the Mountain	Simón de la montaña	Federico Luis	Argentina; Chile; Uruguay
That They May Face the Rising Sun		Pat Collins	Ireland
I Trust You	En vos confío	Agustín Toscano	Argentina
The Successor	Le Successeur	Xavier Legrand	France; Canada; Belgium
The Girls Are Alright	Las chicas están bien	Itsaso Arana	Spain
State of Silence	Estado de silencio	Santiago Maza	Mexico
The Dog Thief	El ladrón de perros	Vinko Tomičić	Bolivia; Chile; Mexico; Ecuador; France; Italy

=== Chilean Film Competition ===
Highlighted title indicates section's best film winner.

English title	Original title	Director(s)	Production countrie(s)
No Estoy en el Mar		Luis Cifuentes Saravia	Chile
A Dark Light	Una Luz Negra	Alberto Hayden	Chile
Aullido de Invierno		Matías Rojas Valencia	Chile; Colombia; Argentina
La Primera Dosis		Roberto Salinas Vergara	Chile
Through Rocks and Clouds	Raíz	Franco García	Peru; Chile
The Fabulous Gold Harvesting Machine	La fabulosa máquina de cosechar oro	Alfredo Pourailly De La Plaza	Chile; Netherlands
Las Cenizas		Stjepan Ostoic	Chile
Primera Persona		Daniel Peralta	Chile
Sariri		Laura Donoso	Chile
Affections	Los Afectos	Diego Ayala, Aníbal Jofré	Chile; Ecuador

=== Chilean Short Film Competition ===
Highlighted title indicates section's best film winner.

English title	Original title	Director(s)	Production countrie(s)
Frascos Vacíos		Guillermo Ribbeck	Chile
Lágrima Seca		Martín Pizarro Veglia	Chile
Paisahe Prohibido		Matías Alarcón	Chile
Todo se Quemará		Simón Vargas	Chile
Transfixion		Diego Fierro-Lablée	Chile
El Cánon		Martín Seeger	Chile
Fiesta de Cumpleaños (o la Venganza de la Historia)		Anastasia Ayazi	Chile
Al Sol, Lejos del Centro		Pascal Viveros, Luciana Merino	Chile
El Día de Mi Independencia		Constanza Majluf	Chile
Al Fin del Mundo		Antonia Sánchez, Isaac Brand	Chile
Entrará una Brisa Preguntando por Mí		Francisca Droppelmann	Chile
María Mar		Rocío Huerta	Chile
Cinco Formas de Borrar un Chupón		Colectivo Niñita Perversa	Chile
El Vuelo de Chaika		Eduardo Bunster, Belén Abarza	Chile
Humboldt		Beatriz Molina Páez	Chile
Helechos		Paz Ramírez	Chile
Corazón de Pollo		Matías Echeverría, Alfonso Ferrer, Isidora Barros	Chile
Desde tu Sombra		Víctor Soto Castillo	Chile
El Silencio del Mar		Tomás Caniulao	Chile
Familia		Picho García, Gabriela Peña	Chile
Marahoro		Sofía Rodríguez	Chile

=== Masters of Cinema ===
The following films were selected for the Masters of Cinema (Maestros del Cine) section, dedicated to films by prestigious filmmakers from around the world:

English title	Original title	Director(s)	Production countrie(s)
From Hilde, with Love	In Liebe, Eure Hilde	Andreas Dresen	Germany
The Falling Star	L'Étoile filante	Dominique Abel, Fiona Gordon	France; Belgium
The Empire	L'Empire	Bruno Dumont	France
The Book of Solutions	Le Livre des solutions	Michel Gondry	France
Un amor		Isabel Coixet	Spain
Carmín		Aldo Garay	Uruguay; Argentina
The Beast	La Bête	Bertrand Bonello	France; Canada
A Ravaging Wind	El viento que arrasa	Paula Hernández	Argentina; Uruguay
Motel Destino		Karim Aïnouz	Brazil

=== Visions of the World ===
The following films were selected for the Visions of the World (Visiones del Mundo) section, dedicated to feature films and documentaries from around the world:

English title	Original title	Director(s)	Production countrie(s)
Good Savage	Buen salvaje	Santiago Mohar	Mexico
Como el Mar		Nicolás Gil Lavedra	Argentina; Uruguay
Bones and Names	Knochen und Namen	Fabian Stumm	Germany
One Hundred Four	Einhundertvier	Jonathan Schörnig	Germany
Diario de un Hombre a la Deriva		José Ibáñez	Chile
White Angel – The End of Marinka	White Angel – Das Ende von Marinka	Arndt Ginzel	Germany
The Quiet Maid	Calladita	Miguel Faus	Spain
Oasis		Tamara Uribe, Felipe Morgado	Chile
Henri: The Last Pirate	Henri, el último pirata	Julián Fernández Prieto	Chile
Stick Together	Bis hierhin und wie weiter?	Felix Maria Buhler	Germany
Laguna Mental		Cristóbal Arteaga	Chile

=== Directors in Focus ===
The following films were selected for the Directors in Focus (Directoras en Foco) section, dedicated to films made by female filmmakers from around the world:

English title	Original title	Director(s)	Production countrie(s)
The Star I Lost	La estrella que perdí	Luz Orlando Brennan	Argentina
Pelökelan		Rocío García Morales	Chile
Milonga		Laura González	Uruguay; Argentina
Dancing Heartbeats		Lisa Wagner	Germany
Sisi & I	Sisi & Ich	Frauke Finsterwalder	Germany
Sincronía		Caro Bloj	Chile
Guián		Nicole Chi	Costa Rica

=== Special Screenings ===
English title	Original title	Director(s)	Production countrie(s)
Martínez		Laura Padilla	Mexico
Problemista		Julio Torres	United States
Heaven Can Wait		Sven Halfar	Germany
The Substance		Coralie Fargeat	United States

=== Retrospective ===
English title	Original title	Director(s)	Production countrie(s)
The Memory of Water (2015)	La memoria del agua	Matías Bize	Chile
Christmas (2009)	Navidad	Sebastián Lelio	Chile
Tony Manero (2009)		Pablo Larraín	Chile
Tea Time (2014)	La once	Maite Alberdi	Chile
Life Kills Me (2007)	La vida me mata	Sebastián Silva	Chile
El Pejesapo (2007)		José Luis Sepúlveda	Chile

=== Sanfic learn ===
The following films were selected for the SANFIC LEARN (SANFIC EDUCA), dedicated to fiction, documentary and animation films with themes related to children, youth and families:

English title	Original title	Director(s)	Production countrie(s)
Pepedrilo		Víctor Cartas Valdivia	Mexico
El Árbol Ya Fue Plantado		Irene Blei Mail	Argentina
Color-ido		Estefanía Piñeres	Colombia
En Mi Piel		Sándor M. Salas	Spain
Mira Niño		Sergio Avellaneda	Spain
Las Delicias		Eduardo Crespo	Argentina
Cacharro		Anselmo Portillo	Venezuela
Mystère		Denis Imbert	France
Mironins		Mikel Mas Bilbao, Txesco Montalt	Spain
Centella		Claudia Claremi	Cuba
Papá Consiguió Trabajo en Marte		Damián Galateo, Joaquín Zelaya	Argentina
Al Otro Lado del Muro		Pau Ortiz	Mexico, Spain
Cuando se Calme la Lluvia		Guillermo Argueta	El Salvador
Ice Merchants		João Gonzalez	Portugal
Los Últimos Veranos		Ricardo Esparragoza	Mexico
Ibrahim		Samir Guesmi	France

== Awards ==
The following awards were given:

=== International Competition ===
- Best Film: State of Silence by Santiago Maza
- Special Jury Mention for Best Film: The Universal Theory by Timm Kröger
- Best Director: Agustín Toscano for I Trust You
- Special Jury Mention for Best Director: Itsaso Arana for The Girls Are Alright
- Best Performance: Lorenzo Ferro for Simon of the Mountain & Franklin Aro for The Dog Thief (ex aequo)

=== Chilean Film Competition ===
- Best Film: The Fabulous Gold Harvesting Machine by Alfredo Pourailly De La Plaza & Aullido de Invierno by Matías Rojas Valencia (ex aequo)
- Best Director: Roberto Salinas Vergara for La Primera Dosis
  - Special Jury Mention for Best Director: Alberto Hayden for Una Luz Negra
- Best Performance: Gastón Salgado for Affections
  - Special Jury Mention for Best Performance: Paola Lattus for Sariri & Las Cenizas
- Special Jury Mention: Through Rocks and Clouds by Franco García

=== Chilean Short Film Competition ===
- Best Short Film: Familia by Picho García and Gabriela Peña & María Mar by Rocío Huerta (ex aequo)
- Special Jury Mention: El Vuelo de Chaika by Eduardo Bunster and Belén Abarza

=== Independent awards ===
- SIGNIS Award: State of Silence by Santiago Maza
