= The Dog Thief =

- Bolivian theatrical release poster
- Directed by: Vinko Tomičić
- Screenplay by: Vinko Tomičić
- Story by: Samm Haillay
- Produced by: Edher Campos; Matías De Bourguignon; Gabriela Maire; Álvaro Manzano Zambrana
- Starring: Franklin Aro; Alfredo Castro
- Cinematography: Sergio Armstrong
- Edited by: Urzula Barba Hopfner
- Music by: Wissam Hojeij
- Production companies: Color Monster; Zafiro Cinema; Calamar Cine; Easy Riders Films; Jirafa; Machete Producciones
- Release dates: June 6, 2024 (Tribeca); August 29, 2024 (Chile); October 17, 2024 (Bolivia); August 14, 2025 (Ecuador)
- Running time: 104 minutes
- Countries: Bolivia; Ecuador; Chile; Mexico; France; Italy
- Language: Spanish

The Dog Thief (Spanish: El ladrón de perros) is a 2024 drama film written and directed by Vinko Tomičić in his directorial debut. It stars Franklin Aro and Alfredo Castro. It follows a poor young orphan who steals the dog of his best client who sees him as a father figure.

A co-production between Bolivia, Ecuador, Chile, Mexico, France and Italy, the film had its world premiere at the 23rd Tribeca Film Festival on June 6, 2024.

== Synopsis ==
Martín is a young orphan who survives by working as a shoeshine boy in La Paz while facing discrimination and poverty. His relationship with a lonely tailor leads him to steal his client's dog, whom he has begun to imagine as his possible father.

== Cast ==
- Franklin Aro as Martin
- Alfredo Castro as Mr. Novoa
- María Luque as Gladys
- Julio César Altamirano as El Sombras
- Ninon Davalos as Mrs. Ambrosia
- Teresa Ruiz as Mrs. Andrea
- Kleber Aro Huasco as El Monedas
- Vladimir Gonza Mamani as El Conejo
- Jhoselyn Rosmery Cosme as Alicia
- Wolframio Sinué as Billar
- Felix Francisco Omonte Vargas as High School Principal
- Iván Cori Mamani as Teacher
- Raúl Montecinos Heredia as Processor

== Release ==
The Dog Thief had its world premiere on June 6, 2024, at the 23rd Tribeca Film Festival, then screened on June 12, 2024, at the 39th Guadalajara International Film Festival, on June 22, 2024, at the 12th Costa Rica International Film Festival, on July 1, 2024, at the 41st Filmfest München, on August 11, 2024, at the 28th Lima Film Festival, on November 27, 2024, at the 39th Mar del Plata International Film Festival, on December 14, 2025, at the 29th International Film Festival of Kerala, on March 17, 2025, at the 28th Málaga Film Festival, on March 31, 2025, at the 64th Cartagena Film Festival, on April 8, 2025, at the Festival cinéma du monde de Sherbrooke, on April 9, 2025, at the 41st Chicago Latino Film Festival, in Canada on April 13, 2025 by TIFF Next Wave, and on May 24, 2025, at the 12th Latin American Film Festival.

The film was released commercially on August 29, 2024, in Chilean theaters, on October 17, 2024, in Bolivian theaters, on May 15, 2025, in Costa Rican theaters, and on August 14, 2025, in Ecuadorian theaters.

== Accolades ==
Award / Festival	Ceremony date	Category	Recipient(s)	Result	Ref.
Tribeca Film Festival	13 June 2024	Best International Narrative Feature	The Dog Thief	Nominated	
Guadalajara International Film Festival	15 June 2024	Best Ibero-American Fiction Feature Film	The Dog Thief	Nominated	
Guadalajara International Film Festival	15 June 2024	New Actor - Special Mention	Franklin Aro	Won	
Filmfest München	6 July 2024	CineVision Award	The Dog Thief	Nominated	
Lima Film Festival	17 August 2024	Best Picture	The Dog Thief	Nominated	
Lima Film Festival	17 August 2024	Special Jury Prize	The Dog Thief	Won	
Santiago International Film Festival	25 August 2024	Best Film – International Competition	The Dog Thief	Nominated	
Santiago International Film Festival	25 August 2024	Best Performance – International Competition	Franklin Aro	Won	
Antalya Golden Orange Film Festival	14 October 2024	Best International Feature Film	The Dog Thief	Nominated	
Antalya Golden Orange Film Festival	14 October 2024	Best Director – International Competition	Vinko Tomičić	Won	
Antalya Golden Orange Film Festival	14 October 2024	Best Actor	Franklin Aro	Won	
Mar del Plata International Film Festival	1 December 2024	Latin-American Competition - Best Film	The Dog Thief	Nominated	
Havana Film Festival	13 December 2024	Best Fiction Feature Film	The Dog Thief	Nominated	
Havana Film Festival	13 December 2024	Best Screenplay	Vinko Tomičić	Won	
Forqué Awards	14 December 2024	Best Latin-American Film	The Dog Thief	Nominated	
Málaga Film Festival	23 March 2025	Best Latin-American Film	The Dog Thief	Won	
Miami Film Festival	14 April 2025	MARIMBAS Award	The Dog Thief	Nominated	
Platino Awards	27 April 2025	Best Ibero-American Debut Film	Vinko Tomičić	Won	
Platino Awards	27 April 2025	Film and Values Education	Vinko Tomičić	Nominated	
Ariel Awards	20 September 2025	Best Ibero-American Film	The Dog Thief	Nominated	
Pedro Sienna Awards	26 September 2025	Best Fiction Feature Film	The Dog Thief	Won	
Pedro Sienna Awards	26 September 2025	Best Director	Vinko Tomicic	Nominated	
Pedro Sienna Awards	26 September 2025	Best Screenplay	Vinko Tomicic	Nominated	
Pedro Sienna Awards	26 September 2025	Best Cinematography	Sergio Armstrong	Won	
