= Blood Will Tell (disambiguation) =

Blood Will Tell is a 2004 video game.

Blood Will Tell may also refer to:

- Blood Will Tell, a 1917 film directed by Charles Miller
- Blood Will Tell, a 1949 Hong Kong film directed by Yueh Feng
- Blood Will Tell (1927 film), an American silent Western film
- Blood Will Tell (2019 film), an Argentinian thriller
- "Blood Will Tell" (short story), a 1963 Rex Stout short story
- Blood Will Tell, alternate title for the 1952 Agatha Christie novel Mrs McGinty's Dead
- Blood Will Tell: The Murder Trials of T. Cullen Davis, a 1979 book by Gary Cartwright
