= Santiago International Film Festival =

Film festival in Santiago, Chile

- Location: Santiago, Chile
- Founded: August 2005; 21 years ago
- Most recent: 22nd Santiago International Film Festival
- Hosted by: Fundación CorpArtes
- Language: Spanish, English
- Website: SANFIC Website

The Santiago International Film Festival (Spanish: Santiago Festival Internacional de Cine; SANFIC) is a film festival that launched in 2005. As its name suggests, the festival takes place in Santiago, Chile.

Along with the Valdivia International Film Festival, SANFIC is one of the film festivals of Chile and South America.

== Competition ==
There are two main competitions at SANFIC: the Chilean Cinema Competition, and an International Competition, each featuring nine shortlisted films. There is also a Local Talent competition for local directors and producers, dedicated to short films, with 18 shortlisted works.

The judging panel and jury are made up of international and Chilean experts from the film industry.

== 10th Anniversary edition ==
SANFIC 2014 (the 10th edition) took place between the 21 and 26 of October, and screened more than 90 titles from 30 countries, some of which had won prizes at the world's most prestigious film festivals (Cannes, Berlin, Venice and Sundance, among others).

=== Participating films ===
The following films took part in the two competitions:

==== International Competition ====
- Aurora (2014 Film), by Rodrigo Sepulveda (Chile)
- El Ardor, by Pablo Frendik (Argentina, Brazil, Mexico, France, U.S.)
- El Cordero, by Juan Francisco Olea Opera Prima (Chile)
- The Selfish Giant, by Clio Barnard (England)
- Whiplash, by Damien Chazelle (Grand Jury Prize at the Sundance Film Festival; U.S.)
- Finsterworld by Frauke Finsterwalder Opera Prima (Germany)
- Los Ausentes, by Luciana Piantanida (Argentina)
- Ruido Rosa (Pink Noise), by Roberto Flores Prieto (Colombia)
- Un Castillo en Italia (Un Chateau en Italie / A Castle in Italy) by Valeria Bruni Tedeschi, France

==== Chilean Cinema Competition ====
- Escapes de Gas (Gas Leaks), by Bruno Salas
- Genoveva, by Paula Castillo
- Joselito, by Bárbara Pestan
- La comodidad en la distancia (Comfort in the Distance), by Jorge Yacoman
- La Invención de la Patria (The Invention of the Fatherland), by Galut Alarcon
- La Once (Tea Time), by Maite Alberdi
- No soy Lorena (I am not Lorena), by Isidora Marras
- Palabras Cruzadas: Los Amigos de Matta-Clark, by Matías Cardone
- Ventana, by Rodrigo Susarte

=== Winning films ===
The following films won awards at the 10th edition of SANFIC:

International Competition

- Best Film: Aurora, by Rodrigo Sepúlveda
- Best Director: Juan Francisco Olea, for El cordero
- Honorable Mention: The Selfish Giant ("El gigante egoísta”), by Clio Barnard
- Honorable Mention: Whiplash, by Damien Chazelle

Chilean Cinema Competition

- Best Film: La once, by Maite Alberdi
- Best Director: Maite Alberdi, for La once
- Honorable Mention: Escapes de gas, by Bruno Salas
- Honorable Mention: Genoveva, by Paola Castillo

Audience Award for Best Film

Escapes de gas, by Bruno Salas

Local Talent Competition

- Best Short Film: Historia de un oso, by Gabriel Osorio
- Honorable Mention: Las horas y los siglos, by Nelson Oyarzúa
- Honorable Mention: Los resentidos, by Pablo Álvarez

Latin American Work in Progress

- La mujer de la esclavina, by Alfonso Gazitúa (Chile)
- Las tetas de mi madre, by Carlos Zapata (Colombia)
- Nunca vas a estar solo, by Álex Anwandter (Chile)

Ventana Sur Prize

- La mujer de la esclavina, by Alfonso Gazitúa (Chile)

Santiago LAB SANFIC Industry Award for documentary projects

(“Premio a proyectos Santiago LAB Documental de SANFIC Industria”)

- Vidas cruzadas, by Paola Castillo
- Honorable Mention: LasFieles, de Valeria Hofmann
- Honorable Mention: El viento sopla donde quiere, by Cristián Saldía

Premio DocsDF:

- Las felicidades del mundo, by Ainara Aparici

Santiago LAB SANFIC Industry Award for fiction projects

(“Premio a proyectos Santiago LAB Ficción de SANFIC Industria”) Encuentros Cartagena Prize: El treinticuatro, by Waldo Salgado Mercado Guadalajara Prize: La Carola, by Juan Francisco Olea Argentina HD Prize: Cabros de mierda, de Gonzalo Justiniano

== Award winners ==
=== International Film Competition ===
Best Film

- 2005 – Los Muertos by Lisandro Alonso (Argentina)
- 2006 – In the Pit (En el hoyo) by Juan Carlos Rulfo (Mexico)
- 2007 – Red Road by Andrea Arnold (United Kingdom, Denmark)
- 2008 – Tony Manero by Pablo Larraín (Chile)
- 2009 – The Exploding Girl by Bradley Rust Gray (United States)
- 2010 – Alamar by Pedro González-Rubio (Mexico)
- 2011 – Das Lied in mir by Florian Cossen (Germany)
- 2012 – Los salvajes by Alejandro Fadel (Argentina)
- 2013 – Shell by Scott Graham (United Kingdom)
- 2014 – Aurora by Rodrigo Sepúlveda (Chile)
- 2015 – The Wolfpack by Crystal Moselle (United States)
- 2016 – Embrace of the Serpent (El abrazo de la serpiente) by Ciro Guerra (Colombia)
- 2017 – The Family (La familia) by Gustavo Rondón Córdova (Venezuela, Chile, Norway)
- 2018 – The Snatch Thief (El motoarrebatador) by Agustín Toscano (Argentina)
- 2019 – Amanda by Mikhaël Hers (France)
- 2020 – Sanctorum by Joshua Gil (Mexico)
- 2021 – As I Want by Samaher Alqadi (Egypt, France, Norway, Palestine)
- 2022 – Klondike (Клондайк) by Maryna Er Gorbach (Ukraine, Turkey)
- 2023 – Valeria is Getting Married by Michal Vinik (Israel, Ukraine)
- 2024 – State of Silence (Estado de silencio) by Santiago Maza (Mexico)

Best Director

- 2005 – Maria Ramos for Justice (Justiça) (Brazil)
- 2006 – Pascale Breton for Illumination (France)
- 2007 – Camila Guzmán Urzúa for El telón de azúcar (Cuba, France)
- 2008 – Pablo Fendrik for La sangre brota (Argentina)
- 2009 – Ciro Guerra for The Wind Journeys (Los viajes del viento) (Colombia)
- 2010 – Matthew Porterfield for Putty Hill (United States)
- 2011 – Yulene Olaizola for Paraísos artificiales (Mexico)
- 2012 – Juan Andrés Arango for La Playa DC (Colombia)
- 2013 – Frédérick Pelletier for Diego Star (Canada, Belgium)
- 2014 – Juan Francisco Olea for El cordero (Chile)
- 2015 – Sebastian Schipper for Victoria (Germany)
- 2016 – Alejandro Fernández Almendras for Much Ado About Nothing (Aquí no ha pasado nada) (Chile)
- 2017 – Gabe Klinger for Porto (Portugal, United States, France, Poland)
- 2018 – Marcelo Martinessi for The Heiresses (Las herederas) (Paraguay)
- 2019 – Alejandro Landes for Monos (Colombia, Argentina, Netherlands, Germany, Sweden, Uruguay)
- 2020 – Lemohang Jeremiah Mosese for This Is Not a Burial, It's a Resurrection (Lesotho)
- 2021 – Visar Morina for Exile (Exil) (Germany)
- 2022 – Roberto Baeza for Punto de encuentro (Chile)
- 2023 – Michal Vinik for Valeria is Getting Married (Israel, Ukraine)
- 2024 – Agustín Toscano for I Trust You (Confío en vos) (Argentina)

Best Performance

- 2016 – Alfredo Castro for From Afar (Desde allá) (Venezuela, Mexico)
- 2017 – Giovanny García and Reggie Reyes for The Family (La familia) (Venezuela, Chile, Norway)
- 2018 – Sergio Prina and Liliana Juárez for The Snatch Thief (El motoarrebatador) (Argentina)
- 2019 – Helena Zengel for System Crasher (Systemsprenger) (Germany)
- 2020 – Alberto Ammann for El silencio del cazador (Argentina) & Mary Twala Mhlongo for This Is Not a Burial, It's a Resurrection (Lesotho)
- 2021 – Mišel Matičević and Sandra Hüller for Exile (Exil) (Germany)
- 2022 – Oleksandr Yatsentiuk for Pamfir (Ukraine, France, Poland, Luxembourg)
- 2023 – Nicole Suazo for Las demas (Chile)
- 2024 – Lorenzo Ferro for Simon of the Mountain (Simón de la montaña) (Argentina, Chile, Uruguay) & Franklin Aro for The Dog Thief (El ladrón de perros) (Bolivia. Chile. Mexico. Ecuador. France. Italy)

Special Jury Mention

- 2005 – Wandering Shadows (La sombra del caminante) by Ciro Guerra (Colombia)
- 2006 – The Minder (El custodio) by Rodrigo Moreno (Argentina)
- 2007 – Special Mention for Actress: Kate Dickie for Red Road (United Kingdom, Denmark)
- 2009 – El General by Natalia Almada (Mexico), Christmas (Navidad) by Sebastián Lelio & Cannot Live Without You (不能没有你) by Leon Dai (Taiwan)
- 2010 – Special Mention for Performance: Cast of October (Octubre) (Peru)
  Special Mention for Direction, Screenplay and Cinematography: Sophie Deraspe for Vital Signs (Les signes vitaux) (Canada)
- 2011 – The Ballad of Genesis and Lady Jaye by Marie Losier (United States), La espera by Francisca Fuenzalida (Chile) & Norberto's Deadline (Norberto apenas tarde) by Daniel Hendler (Uruguay, Argentina)
- 2012 – Cracks in the Shell by Christian Schwochow (Germany)
- 2018 – Doubtful (Mutalim besafek) by Eliran Elya (Israel)
- 2019 – The Third Wife (Vợ ba) by Ash Mayfair (Vietnam)
- 2021 – Cryptozoo by Dash Shaw (United States) & Bosco by Alicia Cano (Uruguay, Italy)
- 2022 – Costa Brava, Lebanon (كوستا برافا، لبنان) by Mounia Akl (Lebanon, France, Qatar) & Happer's Comet by Tyler Taormina (United States)
- 2024 – Special Jury Mention for Best Film: The Universal Theory (Die Theorie von Allem) by Timm Kröger (Germany); Special Jury Mention for Best Director: Itsaso Arana for The Girls Are Alright (Las chicas están bien) (Spain)

Audience Award

- 2005 – Play by Alicia Scherson (Chile)
- 2014 – Escape de gas by Bruno Salas (Chile)
- 2015 – Beyond My Grandfather Allende (Allende, mi abuelo Allende) by Marcia Tambutti (Chile)
- 2018 – Cola de mono by Alberto Fuguet (Chile)
- 2019 – Sumergida by Andrés Finat (Chile)

Honorary Mention

- 2006 – Madeinusa by Claudia Llosa (Peru)
- 2008 – Flower in the Pocket (口袋裏的花) by Liew Seng Tat (Malaysia)

=== Chilean Film Competition ===
Best Film

- 2009 – Paseo by Sergio Castro San-Martín
- 2010 – Manuel de Ribera by Christopher Murray
- 2011 – Ulysses (Ulises) by Óscar Godoy
- 2012 – Cuentos sobre el futuro by Pachi Bustos
- 2013 – Illiterate (Las analfabetas) by Moisés Sepúlveda
- 2014 – Tea Time (La once) by Maite Alberdi
- 2015 – Surire by Bettina Perut and Iván Osnovikoff
- 2016 – El fumigador by Francisco Hevia and Vinko Tomicic
- 2017 – Sapo by Juan Pablo Ternicier
- 2018 – Flow by Nicolás Molina
- 2019 – Lemebel by Joanna Reposi Garibaldi
- 2020 – Las mujeres de mi casa by Valentina Reyes
- 2021 – Karnawal by Juan Pablo Félix (Argentina, Bolivia, Chile)
- 2022 – Villa Olímpica by Sebastián Kohan
- 2023 – Sister & Sister (Las hijas) by Kattia González
- 2024 – The Fabulous Gold Harvesting Machine (La fabulosa máquina de cosechar oro) by Alfredo Pourailly De La Plaza & Aullido de Invierno by Matías Rojas Valencia

Best Director

- 2009 – Cristóbal Cohen and Marcelo Hermosilla for Nosotros
- 2010 – René Ballestero for La quemadura
- 2011 – Constanza Fernández for Mapa para conversar
- 2012 – Álvaro Viguera for Pérez
- 2013 – José Luis Torres Leiva for Ver y escuchar
- 2014 – Maite Alberdi for Tea Time (La once)
- 2015 – Carola Fuentes and Rafael Valdeavellano for Chicago Boys
- 2016 – Carlos Leiva for El primero de la familia
- 2017 – Andrés Lübbert for El color del camaleón
- 2018 – Simón Vargas for Sobre los muertos
- 2019 – Carolina Adriazola and Jose Luis Sepúlveda for Harley Queen
- 2020 – Juan Francisco Riumalló for Onkel Gïnter
- 2021 – Nicol Ruiz Benavides for Forgotten Roads (La nave del olvido)
- 2022 – Felipe Zuñiga for La picada
- 2023 – Bernardo Quesney for History and Geography (Historia y geografía)
- 2024 – Roberto Salinas Vergara for La Primera Dosis

Best Performance

- 2015 – Nicolás Zárate for Inside the Mind of a Psychopath (El Tila: Fragmentos de un psicópata)
- 2016 – Sergio Hernández for You'll Never Be Alone (Nunca vas a estar solo)
- 2017 – Tomás Vidiella and Jaime McManus for La memoria de mi padre
- 2018 – Berta Lasala for Perkin
- 2019 – Carolina Flores for Harley Queen
- 2020 – Max Salgado for Piola
- 2021 – Martin López Lacci for Karnawal (Argentina, Bolivia, Chile)
- 2022 – Mara Bestelli for Dusk Stone (Piedra noche)
- 2023 – Ariana Chaves for Sister & Sister (Las hijas) & Amparo Noguera for History and Geography (Historia y geografía)
- 2024 – Gastón Salgado for Los Afectos

Special Mention

- 2010 – 31 de abril by Víctor Cubillos
  Special Mention for Screenplay: Martín Seeger and Simón Palacios for Piotr: una mala traducción
  Special Mention for Actor: Pablo Cerda for Velódromo
- 2011 – La muerte de Pinochet by Bettina Perut and Iván Osnovikoff
- 2012 – Leontina by Boris Peters, Marker 72 by Miguel Ángel Vidaurre & Valparadaise by Juan Cortés Mancilla
- 2018 – Special Mention for Sound: Rodrigo Robledo and Roberto Collío for Petit Frère
- 2019 – Amukan by Francisco Toro
  Special Mention for Sound: Bettina Perut and Iván Osnovikoff for Los Reyes
- 2021 – Primera by Vee Bravo
- 2023 – Bastard, the Inheritance of a Genocide (Bastardo, La herencia de un genocida) by Pepe Rovano
- 2024 – Special Jury Mention: Through Rocks and Clouds (Raíz) by Franco García; Special Jury Mention for Best Director: Alberto Hayden for Una Luz Negra; Special Jury Mention for Best Performance: Paola Lattus for Sariri & Las Cenizas

=== Latin-American Film Competition ===
Best Film

- 2007 – Familia Tortuga by Rubén Imaz Castro (Mexico)
- 2008 – The Path (El camino) by Ishtar Yasin Gutiérrez (Costa Rica)
- 2009 – Todos mienten by Matías Piñeiro (Argentina)

Best Director

- 2007 – Santiago Otheguy for La León (Argentina)
- 2008 – Juan Manuel Sepúlveda for La frontera infinita (Mexico)
- 2009 – Federico Veiroj for Acne (Acné) (Uruguay)

Special Mention

- 2007 – Tierra roja by Ramiro Gómez (Paraguay)
  Special Mention for Actress: Amparo Noguera for Life Kills Me (La vida me mata) (Chile)
- 2009 – El viento y el agua by Vero Bollow and Igar Yala Collective (Panama) & María y el nuevo mundo by George Walker Torres (Venezuela)

Honorary Mention

- 2008 – The Pope's Toilet (El baño del papa) by César Charlone and Enrique Fernández (Uruguay) & Furtivo by Nicolás León Tannchen (Argentina)

== See also ==
- Valdivia International Film Festival
- Viña del Mar International Film Festival
- Cinema of Chile
