= 28th Lima Film Festival =

2024 film festival

- Official poster of the 28th Lima Film Festival
- Opening film: Frida
- Location: Lima, Peru
- Founded: 1997
- Awards: Trophy Spondylus: Simon of the Mountain
- Directors: Vanessa Vizcarra
- Festival date: 8–17 August 2024
- Website: festivaldelima.com

Lima Film Festival
- 29th 27th

The 28th Lima Film Festival, organized by the Pontifical Catholic University of Peru, took place from 8–17 August 2024 in Lima, Peru. The awards were announced on 17 August 2024, with Simon of the Mountain winning the Trophy Spondylus.

== Background ==
On July 3, 2024, the Lima Film Festival officially announced its 28th edition under the motto "The Ritual of Cinema" (Spanish: El Ritual del Cine). The festival will take place from August 8 to 17, 2024. Organized by the Pontifical Catholic University of Peru and presented by the BBVA Foundation in Peru, the Ministry of Culture of Peru, the Gran Teatro Nacional del Perú, and in collaboration with PromPerú, the complete programming and ticket sales were available starting from July 24, 2024.

In its 28th edition, the film festival paid tribute to the careers of three distinguished personalities: French filmmaker Arnaud Desplechin, Peruvian filmmaker Mary Jiménez, and former Lima Film Festival director Marco Mühletaler. A new official section called "Peruvian Competition" (Spanish: Competencia Peruana) was introduced, highlighting the best Peruvian cinema of the year and providing an exclusive competitive space for national films of various genres and themes.

On August 8, 2024, during the festival's opening ceremony at the Gran Teatro Nacional, attendees booed Minister of Culture Leslie Urteaga during her speech. This reaction was attributed to her handling of the New Film Law, which has been criticized for limiting support for auteur, regional, and indigenous cinema and for imposing content-based restrictions that could lead to censorship.

== Juries ==
=== In Competition ===
==== Latin American Fiction ====
- Lila Avilés, Mexican filmmaker - Jury President
- Daniela Vega, Chilean actress
- Juan Antonio Vigar, Spanish cultural manager
- Rocío Jadue, Chilean film producer
- Karina Pacheco, Peruvian author

==== Latin American Documentary ====
- Carla Gutiérrez, Peruvian filmmaker - Jury President
- María Victoria Peña, Uruguayan cultural manager
- Pavel Giroud, Cuban filmmaker

==== Peruvian Competition ====
- Melina León, Peruvian filmmaker - Jury President
- Ricardo Pacheco, Mexican film distributor
- Carlos Moreno Calderón, Colombian film promotions director

=== Fiction Cinematography ===
- Alfonso Parra Redondo, Spanish cinematographer - Jury President
- Enrica Pérez, Peruvian filmmaker
- Juan Durán, Peruvian filmmaker

=== International Critics ===
- Ana Josefa Silva, Chilean journalist - Jury President
- Raúl Cachay, Peruvian journalist
- Sofía Ferrero Cárrega, Argentine film critic

=== PUCP Community ===
- Víctor Vich
- Vanesa Arenas
- Jared Albornoz
- Sha Sha Gutiérrez
- Adrián Cerna

=== Ministry of Culture of Peru ===
- Natalia Maysundo
- James A. Dettleff
- Gianfranco Brero

=== Peruvian Association of Film Press - APRECI ===
- Pablo Hernández
- Laslo Rojas
- Gisella Barthé

=== Monseñor Luciano Metzinger Communicators Association - APC Signis Peru ===
- Rocío Mendoza Vásquez
- María Rosa Lorbés Iñiguez
- Mónica Villanueva Galdos

=== International Labour Organization - CINETRAB ===
- Teresa Torres
- Rodrigo Portales
- Carmen Benitez

=== Chronicles of Diversity ===
- Gustavo Ochoa - Jury President
- Lesly Quispe Taco
- Aaran Ochante Wilson

=== Association of Female Film Directors of Peru - NUNA ===
- Victoria Guerrero Peirano - Jury President
- Sofía Carillo Zegarra
- Cordelia Sánchez

== Official Selection ==
The lineup of titles selected for the official selection include:

=== In Competition ===
==== Latin American Fiction ====
Highlighted title indicates award winner.

English Title	Original Title	Director(s)	Production Countrie(s)
Baby		Marcelo Caetano	Brazil; France; Netherlands
The Dog Thief	El ladrón de perros	Vinko Tomičić	Bolivia; Chile; Mexico; France; Ecuador; Italy
The Freshly Cut Grass	El aroma del pasto recién cortado	Celina Murga	Argentina; Uruguay; Germany; Mexico; United States
History and Geography	Historia y geografía	Bernardo Quesney	Chile
The Hyperboreans	Los hiperbóreos	Cristóbal León & Joaquín Cociña	Chile
Memories of a Burning Body	Memorias de un cuerpo que arde	Antonella Sudasassi Furniss	Costa Rica; Spain
Motel Destino		Karim Aïnouz	Brazil; France; Germany
Motherland	Kinra	Marco Panatonic	Peru
The Other Son	El otro hijo	Juan Sebastián Quebrada	Colombia; France; Argentina
Pepe		Nelson Carlo De Los Santos Arias	Dominican Republic; Namibia; Germany; France
Reinas		Klaudia Reynicke	Peru; Switzerland; Spain
Simon of the Mountain	Simón de la montaña	Federico Luis	Argentina; Chile; Uruguay
Something Old, Something New, Something Borrowed	Algo viejo, algo nuevo, algo prestado	Hernán Rosselli	Argentina; Portugal; Spain
Sujo		Astrid Rondero & Fernanda Valadez	Mexico; United States; France
Through Rocks and Clouds	Raíz	Franco García Becerra	Peru; Chile
Wild Woman	La mujer salvaje	Alán González	Cuba

==== Latin American Documentary ====
Highlighted title indicates award winner.

English Title	Original Title	Director(s)	Production Countrie(s)
The Bastard Images	El archivo bastardo	Marianela Vega Oroza	Peru
Behind Closed Doors	A Portas Fechadas	João Pedro Bim	Brazil
A Boat Departed from Me Taking Me Away	Partió de mí un barco llevándome	Cecilia Kang	Argentina; Singapore
Carropasajero		César Alejandro Jaimes & Juan Pablo Polanco	Colombia; Germany
The Fabulous Gold Harvesting Machine	La fabulosa máquina de cosechar oro	Alfredo Pourailly De La Plaza	Chile; Netherlands
The Falling Sky	A Queda do Céu	Eryk Rocha & Gabriela Carneiro da Cunha	Brazil; Italy
God Is a Woman	Dieu est une femme	Andrés Peyrot	Panama; France; Switzerland
Landrián		Ernesto Daranas	Colombia; Germany
Mexican Dream	Sueño mexicano	Laura Plancarte	Mexico; United Kingdom
Reas		Lola Arias	Argentina; Germany; Switzerland

==== Peruvian Competition ====
Highlighted title indicates award winner.

English Title	Original Title	Director(s)	Production Countrie(s)
Alone Together	Compartespacios	Carmen Rojas Gamarra	Peru
The Daughter of the Moon	Killapa Wawan	César Galindo	Peru
Family Album	Álbum de familia	Joel Calero	Peru
El huaro		Patricia Wiesse Risso	Peru
Karuana, People of the River	Karuara, la gente del río	Miguel Araoz Cartagena & Stephanie Boyd	Peru
The Legend of the Last Inca	Los indomables	Tito Catacora	Peru
The Social Sin	El pecado social	Juan Carlos Goicochea	Peru
The Uncle Lino	El Tío Lino	Omar Forero	Peru

=== Samples ===
==== Opening film ====
English title	Original title	Director(s)	Production countrie(s)
Frida		Carla Gutierrez	United States

==== Acclaimed ====
English title	Original title	Director(s)	Production countrie(s)
Caught by the Tides	风流一代	Jia Zhangke	China
Eyes of the Soul: Cristina García Rodero	Cristina García Rodero: La mirada oculta	Carlota Nelson	Spain
Filmlovers!	Spectateurs!	Arnaud Desplechin	France
The Girl with the Needle	Pigen med nålen	Magnus von Horn	Denmark; Poland; Sweden
Grand Tour		Miguel Gomes	Portugal; Italy; France
It's Not Me	C'est pas moi	Leos Carax	France
Saturn Return	Segundo premio	Isaki Lacuesta & Pol Rodríguez	Spain; France
The Story of Souleymane	L'histoire de Souleymane	Boris Lojkine	France
The Substance		Coralie Fargeat	United States; United Kingdom; France

==== Galas ====
English title	Original title	Director(s)	Production countrie(s)
Alemania		María Zanetti	Argentina
The Animal Kingdom	Le règne animal	Thomas Cailley	France; Belgium
A Blue Bird	Un pájaro azul	Ariel Rotter	Argentina
Borderland		Pamela Yates	United States
By the Sea	Como el mar	Nicolás Gil Lavedra	Argentina; Uruguay
The Color of the Sky	El color del cielo	Francisco Adrianzén Merino	Peru
Ongoing Cave	La gruta continua	Julián D'Angiolillo	Argentina; Cuba
Pachacútec, The Improbable School	Pachacútec, la escuela improbable	Mariano Carranza	Peru; United States
Prison in the Andes	Penal Cordillera	Felipe Carmona	Chile; Brazil
The Rescue: The Weight of the World	El rapto	Daniela Goggi	Argentina; United States
The Rye Horn	O corno	Jaione Camborda	Spain; Portugal; Belgium
Stay Still	Quédate quieto	Joanna Lombardi	Peru; Uruguay; Netherlands

== Awards ==
=== In Competition ===
==== Fiction ====
- Trophy Spondylus: Simon of the Mountain by Federico Luis
- Special Jury Prize: The Dog Thief by Vinko Tomičić
- Best Director: Franco García Becerra for Through Rocks and Clouds
- Best Actress: Maribel Felpeto for Something Old, Something New, Something Borrowed
- Best Actor: Lorenzo Ferro for Simon of the Mountain
- Best Screenplay: Klaudia Reynicke & Diego Vega for Reinas
- Best Debut: Motherland by Marco Panatonic

==== Fiction Cinematography ====
- Best Cinematography: Lorenzo Casadio Vanucci for Wild Woman

==== Documentary ====
- Trophy Spondylus: The Fabulous Gold Harvesting Machine by Alfredo Pourailly de la Plaza
  - Special Mention: Reas by Lola Arias

==== Peruvian Competition ====
- Best Film: Karuara, People of the River by Miguel Araoz Cartagena & Stephanie Boyd
- Special Jury Prize: The Social Sin by Juan Carlos Goicochea
- Best Director: Patricia Wiesse Risso for El huaro

==== International Critics ====
- International Critics' Jury Award for Best Film: Motherland by Marco Panatonic

==== Audience ====
- Audience Award for the Best Voted Film from the Fiction, Documentary, and Made in Peru sections: Karuara, People of the River by Miguel Araoz Cartagena & Stephanie Boyd

==== PUCP Community ====
- PUCP Community Award for Made in Peru Best Film: El huaro by Patricia Wiesse Risso

=== Other Awards ===
- Ministry of Culture Jury Award for Best Peruvian Film: Motherland by Marco Panatonic
- International Labour Organization – CINETRAB Award for Best Fiction: Motherland by Marco Panatonic
- International Labour Organization – CINETRAB Award for Best Documentary: The Fabulous Gold Harvesting Machine by Alfredo Pourailly de la Plaza
- Peruvian Association of Film Press - APRECI Award for Best Film in Competition: Motherland by Marco Panatonic
  - Honorable Mention: Simon of the Mountain by Federico Luis
- APC Signis Peru - Monseñor Luciano Metzinger Communicators Association Award: Motherland by Marco Panatonic
- Gio Award: Baby by Marcelo Caetano
- NUNA Award: El huaro by Patricia Wiesse Risso
