= Bernarda Gallardo =

Chilean child advocate

Bernarda Gallardo Olivieri
- Born: 1959 (age 66–67); Santiago, Chile
- Education: Pontifical Catholic University of Chile
- Occupations: Sociologist, activist
- Known for: Adoption and dignified funerals for dead newborns
- Spouse: Jaime Barría
- Children: Francisca (biological); Alejandra and José (adopted); 5 dead children named Aurora, Manuel, Víctor, Cristóbal and Margarita

Bernarda Gallardo (born 1959) is a Chilean woman famous for adopting dead babies.

== Early life ==
Bernarda Gallardo was born in 1959. While in the 12th grade, she was raped by a neighborhood man. At the age of 16, she found herself pregnant and without family support. The birth of her daughter, Francisca, required an emergency caesarean section that left Gallardo infertile. She left home and was supported by friends at the community college as she raised her daughter. Gallardo says this experience makes her feel connected to pregnant women in desperate situations. "After I was raped, I was lucky enough to be able to move on because of the support I got from my friends," she says. "But if I had been left on my own, perhaps I would have felt as helpless as [women who abandon their children] do."

Gallardo began studying sociology at the college. She was always hungry, but Francisca "was her strength" that got her through college. The two have remained close. Francisca went into film and married a Frenchman. She now lives in Paris.

At the age of 40, Gallardo met Jaime Barría who would become her husband. The couple adopted two children: Alejandra and José.

== Aurora ==
In Chile, around ten babies are found at city dumps each year. Most dumps are not open to the public, so the actual number of bodies disposed of in this manner is likely higher. On the morning of Friday, 4 April 2003, Gallardo paused to check the newspaper headlines as she does each morning. The headline, "Horrendo acto criminal: Botan un recién nacido al basural" ("A horrendous criminal act: A newborn baby was thrown on the rubbish dump"), described a newborn found inside a garbage bag at a local dump in Puerto Montt, Chile. Gallardo was shocked and instantly felt a connection to the child; "...that could have easily been my baby", she thought. However, she composed herself and continued about her day.

That evening Gallardo came across the headline again, this time at home with Barría. "What will happen to the dead baby they found in the trash?" she asked her husband. "What if we have a funeral?" she proposed. Barría agreed and on Monday morning Gallardo set out to obtain the body. She asked to speak with judge Francisco Javier del Campo at the First Criminal Court of Puerto Montt. When he arrived after a two-hour wait, Gallardo declared "I came to ask permission to bury the baby that appeared in the trash." Del Campo was confused and Gallardo did not know what to say; eventually, she offered "I want to give a human burial ... I want authorization to provide a Christian burial." Still confused, del Campo asked "Why?" She replied "Because he's a human being, like you and me".

Judge del Campo was suspicious. He thought Gallardo was the biological mother of Aurora and wanted the body back out of guilt, but wanted to avoid criminal charges. He also considered the possibility that Gallardo was involved in organ trafficking. Gallardo was persistent. "Jaime and I are adoptive parents of two children", she explained. "The baby that was found dead in the landfill could have been the third." Eventually del Campo was convinced of her good intentions but told Gallardo that he could not authorize the release of the body then - an autopsy had to be performed and the crime investigated. Del Campo later called it the strangest case of his career and said it was without legal precedence.

According to Chilean law, if a body is not claimed by family members it is classified as human waste and disposed of with surgical trash. Additionally, a doctor has to rule that the baby was not stillborn for it to be considered human and be given a proper burial. This meant that Gallardo had to get a doctor to classify the child, which she named Aurora after the Roman goddess of dawn, as having lived. Often doctors prefer to say a child never lived to protect women, who face prison terms of up to five years for abandoning their (living) children. (Chile does not have a safe-haven law.) Additionally, in order to claim the body, Gallardo had to legally adopt Aurora. Del Campo suggested that she follow up for any news the following week.

When Gallardo returned, there was no news on the case, so she came back the next week with still no further news. Gallardo returned each week for 25 weeks until finally Aurora was released on October 18. By that time, the case was famous; locals had followed updates to the story in the local newspaper. A publisher donated 1000 cards funeral invitations and a funeral home donated a casket, hearse, and cross.

The funeral was held October 24. An estimated 500 people lined the streets in two rows of cars. Gallardo said the funeral was like a big birthday party as people sang songs and read poetry about Aurora. A school bus brought the local school children. A journalist wept at the tomb. The director of the Legal Medical Service, Konstantin Ziolkowski, also attended. "The case of Aurora left me marked," he said. "In my job, I am used to the fact that nobody, not even family members, are interested in removing the bodies, which spend months in the freezer. When Bernarda and her husband came to look for the remains of the baby I felt that there was still humanity in people."

Gallardo said she was thankful for the unexpectedly large crowd. "I wanted to get my local community to think about what was going on. Why are babies being left to die when there are at least four families ready and waiting and in the right condition to adopt an unwanted baby?" she recalls. Bernarda gave the eulogy: "You were born to be abandoned in a dumpster – that hurts and much – but also to leave engraved in our hearts your memory as the daughter of this city, a city that in your name for your love is committed to welcome each new life that she conceives."

== Further efforts ==
The day after Aurora's funeral, another baby was found abandoned at the same dump. Gallardo was furious that her efforts for Aurora had seemingly been for nothing. "People did not give a damn about Aurora's death. They laughed at her, her pain, they had killed again," recalled a tearful Gallardo. She resolved to adopt and bury the child, which she named Manuel, just as she had done for Aurora. In November, she hung posters saying "Don't throw your babies in the rubbish" at every Puerto Montt trash dump. In December, she visited Ziolkowski at the Legal Medical Service to inquire as to the status of Manuel. The autopsy revealed that Manuel had suffocated to death in a trash bag as he wept. The report hit Gallardo hard. "I never knew how much Aurora suffered, but with Manuel I had certainty. His death was cruel."

As she waited for Manuel's release, she wrote letters to newspapers, television stations, the Senate, the first lady, and the director of National Children's Service (SENAME). She wanted someone to do something to prevent further killings, to say publicly that the children's lives matter. On 28 April 2004, SENAME announced they would file a complaint in the cases, increasing the chances of finding those responsible. Previously, the court was only able to investigate women who had visited a clinic during their pregnancy. On the SENAME plan, Chile is now able to find women who never visited a clinic. Satisfied by the progress, Gallardo and her husband resumed plans to adopt a third (living) child.

Gallardo has since adopted two more abandoned babies – Victor and Cristobal – and is in the process of adopting another, Margarita. She campaigns for better education on family planning and domestic violence in Chile. She feels current laws victimize poor women and those who have been abused, and is in favor of a safe-haven law allowing women to leave their unwanted children at a hospital without penalty. Gallardo sums up her philosophy on life: "Once I saw a photo ... the prettiest flower came out of a pile of cow dung. Of the most ugly can be born the most beautiful. What do I do with these dead babies is a service to life."

== Legacy ==
Gallardo's efforts inspired director Rodrigo Sepúlveda to make a movie about her life, entitled Aurora (2014). The film has been shown throughout Chile and internationally at film festivals.

== See also ==
- Children's rights in Chile
