= Some Beasts =

2019 film

- Film poster
- Directed by: Jorge Riquelme Serrano
- Written by: Jorge Riquelme Serrano; Nicolás Diodovich
- Produced by: Jorge Riquelme Serrano; Laberinto Films
- Starring: Paulina García; Alfredo Castro
- Cinematography: Eduardo Bunster
- Edited by: Jorge Riquelme Serrano; Valeria Hernández
- Music by: Carlos Cabezas
- Release date: 26 September 2019 (San Sebastian Film Festival)
- Running time: 97 minutes
- Country: Chile
- Language: Spanish

Some Beasts (Spanish: Algunas Bestias) is a 2019 Chilean film directed by Jorge Riquelme Serrano, with a script written by Riquelme and Nicolás Diodovich. It was set and filmed in Chaullïn, an island located in southern Chile that was uninhabited for decades. It was the big winner at Toulouse’s 35th Films in Progress, a prix that help to some rigorously selected latinoamerican films finding their way into the post-production stage, Some Beasts won three of the four prizes given by the Festival: the Films in Progress Prize; the Cine Plus Films in Progress Prize and the Distributors and Exhibitors Prize. Starring Paulina García and Alfredo Castro it was premiered in the New Directors section at the San Sebastián International Film Festival 2019, where it won the First Prize.

== Plot ==
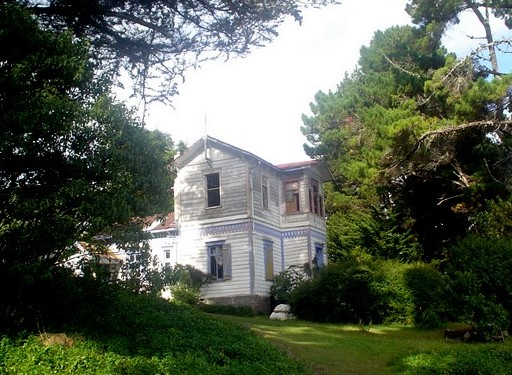
Chaullín Island, Chile, Some Beasts shooting location

An eager family arrived on an uninhabited island on the southern coast of Chile, with dreams of building a tourist hotel in that idyllic location. However, when the man who transported them from the mainland disappears, the family finds themselves trapped on the island. With cold temperatures, no water, and no sense of security, their spirits and camaraderie begin to falter, revealing the darker aspects of the family's nature.

== Cast ==
- Paulina García, as Dolores
- Alfredo Castro, as Antonio
- Consuelo Carreño, as Consuelo
- Gastón Salgado, as Alejandro
- Andrew Bargsted, as Máximo
- Millaray Lobos, as Ana
- Nicolás Zárate, as Nicolás
