= Henri: The Last Pirate =

- Theatrical release poster
- Directed by: Julián Fernández Prieto
- Produced by: Dominique Rammsy Sánchez
- Cinematography: Tomás Yovane
- Edited by: Monserrat Albarracín
- Music by: Loti García Haoa; Pablo Yovane
- Production company: Productora -1 Cine
- Distributed by: Market Chile
- Release dates: May 2, 2024 (L'Entrepôt); March 20, 2025 (Chile)
- Running time: 90 minutes
- Country: Chile
- Language: Spanish

Henri: The Last Pirate (Spanish: Henri, el último pirata) is a 2024 Chilean documentary film directed by Julián Fernández Prieto in his directorial debut. It follows the story of French explorer and diver Henri García, who arrived on Easter Island to build a new life.

== Synopsis ==
Through archival footage, the documentary showcases the life and legacy of French explorer and diver Henri García, who fell in love with Easter Island and decided to start a new life.

== Release ==
Henri: The Last Pirate had its world premiere on May 2, 2024, at the L'Entrepôt cinema in Paris, then screened on August 22, 2024, at the 20th Santiago International Film Festival.

The film was commercially released on March 20, 2025 in Chilean theaters.
