= The Council of Birds =

2014 German drama film

- Directed by: Timm Kröger
- Screenplay by: Roderick Warich; Timm Kröger
- Starring: Eva Maria Jost
- Cinematography: Roland Stuprich
- Edited by: Jann Anderegg
- Music by: John Gürtler; Jan Miserre
- Release date: 2014
- Country: Germany

The Council of Birds (German: Zerrumpelt Herz) is a 2014 German drama film co-written and directed by Timm Kröger, at his feature film debut.

Originally the Kröger's graduation film from the Film Academy Baden-Württemberg, it premiered at the 71st Venice International Film Festival in the International Critics' Week sidebar. The film was also screened at the 2015 Belgrade International Film Festival, where Kröger was awarded best director.

== Cast ==
- Thorsten Wien as Paul Leinert
- Eva Maria Jost as Anna
- Daniel Krauss as Willi Krück
- Christian Blümel as Otto
- Andreas Conrad as Dr. Mandelbrodt
