= Alfredo Castro (actor) =

Chilean actor

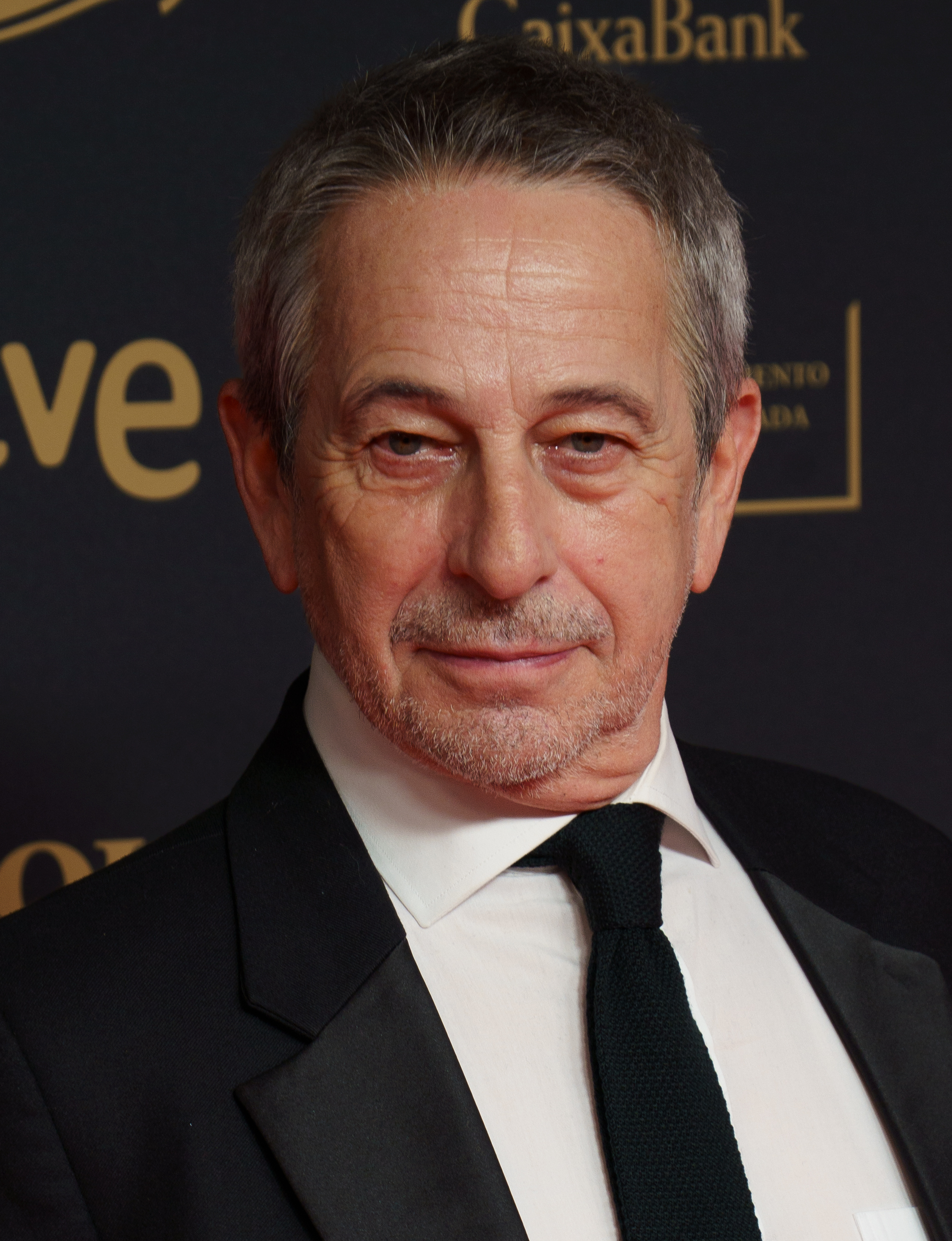
- Castro in 2025
- Born: 19 December 1955 (age 70); Recoleta, Santiago, Chile
- Occupation: Actor
- Years active: 1982–present
- Political party: Democratic Revolution
- Spouse: Taira Court (m. 1997; div. 2008)
- Children: 1

Alfredo Arturo Castro Gómez (born 19 December 1955), best known as Alfredo Castro, is a Chilean actor. With an established career in theater and television, he became one of the most prominent Latin American film actors of the 2010s.

== Personal and early life ==
Castro grew up in a family of five brothers; his mother died of cancer when he was 10. He attended elementary and middle school at Saint Gabriel de Las Condes, Kent School in Providencia and Liceo de Hombres No. 11 in Las Condes.

Castro entered the Theater Department of the Faculty of Arts of the University of Chile, where he graduated in acting in 1977. That same year he received the APES Award from the Association of Entertainment Journalists. That same year he debuted in Equus, with good reviews from the specialized press.

== Acting career ==
Between 1978 and 1981, Castro worked in Teatro Itinerante, where he was one of the founders. In 1982, he participated in the production of De cara al mañana for Televisión Nacional de Chile, beginning his extensive career on the small screen. He traveled to London in 1983, with a scholarship from the British Council to study at the London Academy of Music and Dramatic Art.

In 1989, Castro received a scholarship from the Government of France to perfect himself in theater directing in Paris, Strasbourg and Lyon. He returned the same year and founded the company Teatro La Memoria. In 2013, he announced the closure, due to lack of funds, of this theater that operated in Bellavista 503. Before he had notified that he should also end his research center that gave seminars on dramaturgy, directing, acting and writing.

Castro worked as a teacher and deputy director of the Fernando González Theater Academy.

For the theater of the Catholic University, Castro staged the plays Theo and Vicente mown by the sun (adaptation of Nous, Theo et Vincent Van Gogh, by Jean Menaud; 1990) and King Lear, with a translation by Nicanor Parra; and in Chile, La Catedral de la Luz (1995), by Pablo Álvarez and Casa de Luna (1997) by Juan Claudio Burgos Droguett, a work inspired by the novel El lugar sinlimites, by José Donoso.

Castro was president of the Asociación Gremial de Directores de Chile (1997-2000) and artistic director of the Muestra de Dramaturgia organized by the General Secretariat of Government (1999-2000). During that same season, he staged Hechos consumados by Juan Radrigán and Patas de perro, based on the homonymous novel by Carlos Droguett.

Castro joined Televisión Nacional de Chile in 1998, collaborated closely with director Vicente Sabatini, with several performances in the Golden Age of TV series, achieving great popularity with his roles in La Fiera, Romané, Pampa Ilusión, El Circo de las Montini, Los Pincheira, among others.

In 2001, Castro directed Las sirvientas (also translated as Las criadas, by Jean Genet) and starred in Copi's Eva Perón, a play that marked his return to the stage as an actor.

In 2004, Castro directed Claudia Di Girolamo in Sarah Kane's play Psicosis 4:48. The following year, for the play he won an Altazor Award for Best Theater Director.

In 2006, Castro is named by Chile Elige as the third best Chilean actor of all time.

Castro made his film debut in the drama Fuga in 2006 and received critical acclaim for his performance in Tony Manero in 2008. He gained recognition for his subsequent work in roles such as Post Mortem (2010) and No (2012), as well as in leading roles in Desde allá (2015) and The Club (2016).

In 2012, Castro decided to withdraw from the telenovelas with which he became popular and to which he had dedicated a large part of his life, the last being La Doña.

In 2014, Castro directed the famous play A Streetcar Named Desire by American playwright Tennessee Williams, starring Amparo Noguera, Marcelo Alonso, Luis Gnecco and Paloma Moreno.

In 2017, Castro received the Medal of Honor from the Chamber of Deputies of Chile.

In 2019, Castro received the Starlight International Cinema Award at the 76th Venice International Film Festival for his artistic career. In March 2020, Castro was chosen as the best theater actor of the 2010s by El Mercurio.

In June 2024, Castro was invited to become a member of the Academy of Motion Picture Arts and Sciences.

== Selected filmography ==
=== Film ===
Film
| Year | Title | Role | Director |
|---|---|---|---|
| 1999 | La chica del crillón | Gastón | Alberto Daiber |
| 2006 | Fuga | Claudio Leal | Pablo Larraín |
| 2007 | Casa de remolienda | Renato | Joaquín Eyzaguirre |
| 2008 | Secretos | Guru | Valeria Sarmiento |
| 2008 | Tony Manero | Raúl Peralta | Pablo Larraín |
| 2008 | The Good Life | Jorge | Andrés Wood |
| 2010 | Post Mortem | Mario Cornejo | Pablo Larraín |
| 2012 | It Was the Son | Busa | Daniele Ciprì |
| 2013 | Il mondo fino in fondo | Lucho, el taxista | Alessandro Lunardelli |
| 2013 | No | Luis Guzmán | Pablo Larraín |
| 2013 | Carne de Perro | Pastor Evangélico | Fernando Guzzoni |
| 2014 | The Quispe Girls | Fernando | Sebastian Sepulveda |
| 2014 | Aurora | Santiago | Rodrigo Sepulveda |
| 2014 | Ventana | | Rodrigo Susarte |
| 2015 | The Club | Padre Vidal | Pablo Larraín |
| 2015 | From Afar | Armando | Lorenzo Vigas |
| 2016 | Neruda | Gabriel González Videla, president of Chile | Pablo Larraín |
| 2017 | Severina | Otón | Felipe Hirsch |
| 2017 | The Summit | Desiderio García | Santiago Mitre |
| 2017 | Los Perros | Juan, former colonel | Marcela Said |
| 2018 | Rojo | Detective Sinclair | Benjamín Naishtat |
| 2018 | Museum | Dr. Núñez | Alonso Ruizpalacios |
| 2019 | Perro Bomba | El Jefe | Juan Cáceres |
| 2019 | Medea | Camionero | Alejandro Moreno |
| 2019 | White on White | Pedro | Theo Court |
| 2019 | Some Beasts | Antonio | Jorge Riquelme Serrano |
| 2019 | The Prince | "the Stallion" | Sebastián Muñoz |
| 2020 | My Tender Matador | The Queen of the Corner | Rodrigo Sepúlveda |
| 2020 | Perfidious | Paolo | Illeane D Velasquez |
| 2020 | Karnawal | El Corto | Juan Pablo Félix |
| 2020 | Verlust | Constantin | Esmir Filho |
| 2021 | Immersion | Ricardo | Nicolás Postiglione |
| 2021 | Dusk Stone | Genaro | Iván Fund |
| 2023 | El Conde | Fyodor | Pablo Larraín |
| 2023 | The Settlers | José Menéndez | Felipe Gálvez Haberle |
| 2024 | City of Dreams | El Jefe | Mohit Ramchandani |
| 2024 | The Dog Thief | Mr. Novoa | Vinko Tomičić |
| 2024 | Isla Negra | Guillermo | Jorge Riquelme Serrano |
| 2024 | They Will Be Dust | Flavio | Carlos Marqués-Marcet |
| 2025 | The Follies | | Rodrigo García |

=== Television series ===
TV
| Year | Title | Role | Channel |
|---|---|---|---|
| 1982 | De Cara al Mañana | Claudio Castañeda | TVN |
| 1984 | La Represa | Samuel Gómez / Samuel Betancourt | TVN |
| 1984 | Los Títeres | Julio Barros | Canal 13 |
| 1988 | Vivir Así | Ito Orsini | Canal 13 |
| 1990 | ¿Te Conté? | "Frula" | Canal 13 |
| 1991 | Volver a Empezar | Pedro Pablo Oroz | TVN |
| 1992 | El Palo al Gato | Nando | Canal 13 |
| 1993 | Jaque Mate | Jonathan Astudillo | TVN |
| 1994 | Champaña | Renán Bascur | Canal 13 |
| 1995 | El Amor Está de Moda | Leonardo "León" Soto | Canal 13 |
| 1995 | Amor a Domicilio | Romeo Ulloa Gatica | Canal 13 |
| 1996 | Adrenalina | Efraín Domínguez | Canal 13 |
| 1997 | Eclipse de Luna | Jeremías Holtz | Canal 13 |
| 1998 | Iorana | Luciano Cox | TVN |
| 1999 | La Fiera | Ernesto Lizana | TVN |
| 2000 | Romané | Lazlo California | TVN |
| 2001 | Pampa Ilusión | Eulogio Martínez | TVN |
| 2002 | El Circo de las Montini | César Mondaca | TVN |
| 2003 | Puertas Adentro | Julio Albornoz | TVN |
| 2004 | Los Pincheira | Floridor Carmona | TVN |
| 2005 | Versus | Dr. Arístides Montenegro | TVN |
| 2006 | Floribella | Franz von Mayerlitz | TVN |
| 2007 | Corazón de María | Wladimir Tapia | TVN |
| 2008 | Viuda Alegre | José Pablo Zulueta | TVN |
| 2009 | Los Exitosos Pells | Guido Wedell | TVN |
| 2010 | Manuel Rodríguez | Francisco Casimiro Marcó del Pont | Chilevisión |
| 2011-2012 | La Doña | Pedro Lisperguer | Chilevisión |
| 2016 | Narcos | Abel Escobar | Netflix |
| 2017 | Os Días eram Assim | | Globo |
| 2026 | Alguien tiene que saber | Montero | Netflix |
