= The Social Sin =

- Promotional release poster
- Directed by: Juan Carlos Goicochea
- Written by: Juan Carlos Goicochea
- Produced by: Diana Castro
- Starring: Roger Pinchi; William Pinchi; Pepe Andrews
- Cinematography: Carlos Sánchez; Pablo Ráez; Ángel Pajares
- Edited by: Antonlín Prieto; Juan Carlos Goicochea
- Music by: Fernando Arpi Cruz; Internacional Yurimaguas; Chalena Vásquez; Ruth Torres Félix; Kamilo Riveros Vásquez; Tilsa Llerena; Lucy de Mantilla
- Production companies: Libélula Films; Tupay Cine
- Release date: August 9, 2024 (Lima)
- Running time: 82 minutes
- Country: Peru
- Language: Spanish

The Social Sin (Spanish: El pecado social) is a 2024 Peruvian documentary film written, co-edited and directed by Juan Carlos Goicochea in his directorial debut. It follows Roger Pinchi who seeks justice for himself and his trans sister murdered by the terrorist group Túpac Amaru Revolutionary Movement.

== Synopsis ==
Roger Pinchi Vásquez, a gay man and teacher, lived in Tarapoto, a town in the Peruvian jungle, during the 1980s, when the Túpac Amaru Revolutionary Movement (MRTA) began its incursion into that region and began social cleansing campaigns against sexual dissidents. In 1990, when he was mistaken for his sister Fransuá, a trans hairdresser, Roger was kidnapped by the emerretistas. He is quickly released, but his sister is murdered by the terrorist group. Due to these events, Roger is expelled from the primary school where he worked, and flees to Lima as a displaced person from the violence. Thus, after testifying at the Place of Memory, he seeks justice and reparation from the Peruvian State.

== Cast ==
- Roger Pinchi
- William Pinchi
- Pepe Andrews

== Production ==
The research and writing stage of the script lasted 2 years, beginning in 2014 as a project on the rescue of memory in northeastern Peru, traveling to Tarapoto the following year to delve deeper into the night of the Gardenias, a massacre committed by the MRTA against the LGBT+ population. An attempt was made to finance the documentary through crowdfunding. In 2019, the project received financial support from the Audiovisual, Phonography and New Media Directorate (DAFO) for its post-production.

== Release ==
The Social Sin had its world premiere on August 9, 2024, at the 28th Lima Film Festival.

== Accolades ==
Year	Award / Festival	Category	Recipient	Result	Ref.
2024	28th Lima Film Festival	Peruvian Competition - Best Film	The Social Sin	Nominated	
2024	28th Lima Film Festival	Special Jury Prize	The Social Sin	Won	
