= Simon of the Mountain =

2024 film by Federico Luis

- Spanish: Simón de la montaña
- Directed by: Federico Luis
- Written by: Federico Luis; Tomas Murphy; Agustin Toscano
- Produced by: Patricio Álvarez Casado
- Starring: Lorenzo Ferro; Kiara Supini; Pehuen Pedre
- Cinematography: Marcos Hastrup
- Edited by: Tomas Murphy; Andres Medina
- Music by: Hernán González Villamil
- Production companies: 20/20 Films; Planta Producciones; Mother Superior
- Distributed by: Moving Pics (Argentina)
- Release dates: 15 May 2024 (Cannes); 31 October 2024 (Argentina)
- Running time: 98 minutes
- Countries: Argentina; Chile; Uruguay
- Language: Spanish

Simon of the Mountain (Spanish: Simón de la montaña) is a 2024 coming-of-age drama film co-written and directed by Federico Luis in his feature directorial debut. It stars Lorenzo Ferro as a lonely young man who becomes a part of a group of disabled teenagers. It is a co-production between Argentina, Chile and Uruguay. It had its world premiere at the 77th Cannes Film Festival on 15 May 2024, where it won the Critics' Week Grand Prize.

== Plot ==
21-year-old Simón joins a group of disabled young people on a windswept mountainside. The group is on a pilgrimage. They immediately accept the non-disabled Simón into their ranks and he becomes friends with Pehuen. Simón's character begins to change through his experiences with the young people. He gradually creates a new identity for himself and accepts Pehuen's offer of coaching to obtain an official disability card. This would enable him to stay with the group and receive regular state aid.

When he imitates such behavior patterns in front of his mother and her boyfriend, he is called an "idiot". Simón is increasingly seen by his family as stubborn and uncooperative. His life becomes more complicated when the disabled girl Colo falls in love with him and hopes for a romance.

At the end of the film, Simón undergoes a psychiatric assessment by the authorities in order to obtain a disability card.

== Cast ==
- Lorenzo Ferro as Simón
- Kiara Supini as Colo
- Pehuen Pedre as Pehuen
- Laura Nevole as Simón's mother
- Agustin Toscano as Agustin
- Camila Hirane as Lucy

== Production ==
The film is inspired by the director's own experience of working as a teacher's assistant at a drama school for disabled people. It was there that Luis met aspiring actor Pehuen Pedre, who offered to tutor him for the disability exam. Luis selected him to portray a mentor for the protagonist Simón.

Patricio Álvarez Casado produced through film for 20/20 Films (Argentina), in co-production with Planta Producciones (Chile) and Mother Superior (Uruguay).

== Release ==
The film was selected to be screened in the main competition of the Critics' Week section at the 77th Cannes Film Festival, where it had its world premiere on 15 May 2024.

Paris-based company Luxbox acquired the international sales rights to the film. It was theatrically released in Argentina on 31 October 2024.

== Reception ==
=== Critical response ===
On the review aggregator website Rotten Tomatoes, 91% of 22 critics' reviews are positive, with an average rating of 7.2/10. The website's consensus reads: "A bold, quietly unsettling story of identity, Simon of the Mountain relays a richly human story of disabled youth by portraying their adolescence with honesty, complexity, and a refusal to patronize."

=== Accolades ===
Award	Date of ceremony	Category	Recipient(s)	Result	Ref.
Cannes Film Festival	25 May 2024 (Note: The award ceremony of the 63rd Critics' Week was held on 22 May 2024.)	Critics' Week Grand Prize	Federico Luis	Won	
Cannes Film Festival	25 May 2024	Caméra d'Or	Federico Luis	Nominated	
Lima Film Festival	17 August 2024	Best Picture	Simon of the Mountain	Won	
Lima Film Festival	17 August 2024	Peruvian Association of Film Press (APRECI) Award for Best Film in Competition – Honorable Mention	Simon of the Mountain	Won	
Lima Film Festival	17 August 2024	Best Actor	Lorenzo Ferro	Won	
Santiago International Film Festival	25 August 2024	Best Film – International Competition	Simon of the Mountain	Nominated	
Santiago International Film Festival	25 August 2024	Best Performance – International Competition	Lorenzo Ferro	Won	
San Sebastián International Film Festival	28 September 2024	Latin Horizons	Simon of the Mountain	Nominated	
