= Paulina García =

Chilean actress, stage director, and playwright

Pali García
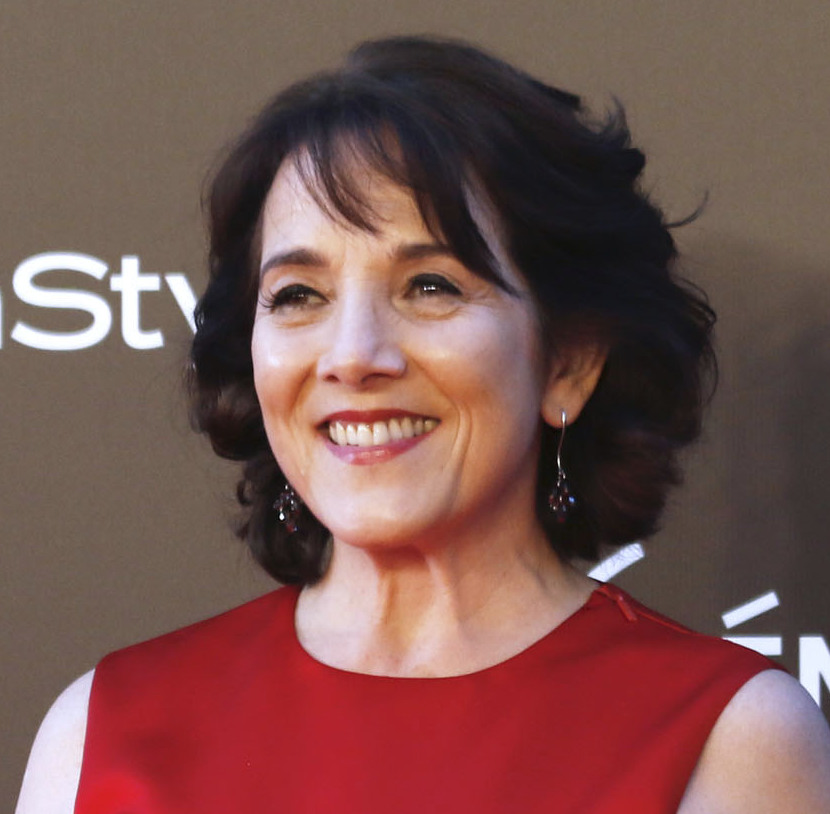
- García in 2017
- Born: Paulina García Alfonso; 27 November 1960 (age 65); Santiago, Chile
- Occupation: Actress
- Years active: 1983–present
- Spouse: Juan Carlos Zagal
- Children: 3

Paulina García Alfonso (born 27 November 1960), better known as Pali García, is a Chilean actress, stage director, and playwright.

García debuted on television with a small role in the telenovela Los títeres (1984), but she was soon known for her theatre direction and for her various performances in films such as Tres noches de un sábado (2002), Cachimba (2004), Casa de remolienda (2007) and Gloria (2013).

García has received four nominations for the Altazor Awards, winning on one occasion, and three for the APES Awards — the Chilean Arts and Entertainment Critics Awards—winning twice. In February 2013 she won the prestigious Silver Bear for Best Actress at the Berlin International Film Festival for her performance in the movie Gloria, directed by Sebastián Lelio. In 2016, she appeared in Ira Sachs' film, Little Men.

== Biography ==
Born in Santiago, García studied acting at the Pontifical Catholic University of Chile, where she graduated with a degree in theatre arts and later with diplomas in theatre direction and writing.

García made her debut at Catholic University's theatre in 1983 in ¿Dónde estará la Jeanette? ("Where could Jeanette be?") by Luis Rivano, a work for which she received an APES Award for best actress. Since then, she has acted in over thirty productions including Cariño malo, by Inés Margarita Stranger, El tío Vania, by Chekhov, The Trojan Women, by Euripides, El lugar común, Las analfabetas and BBB-Up.

The year following her theatre debut, García appeared on television as Adriana Godán in the TV series Los títeres, a role she shared with actress Gloria Münchmeyer.

The first work she directed was El continente negro ("The Dark Continent") by Marco Antonio de la Parra for which she received an APES Award nomination for best director in 1996. A grant from the National Arts Development Fund (Fondo Nacional de Desarrollo Cultural de las Artes, FONDART) allowed for the financing of productions such as Lucrecia y Judith by the same author, and Look Back in Anger by John Osborne. She has also directed at national theatre festivals on three occasions, directing works by authors such as Alberto Fuguet and Celeste Gómez.

García has taught acting at the theatre school of the University of Chile, at Fernando González night school, at the University for the Arts, Sciences, and Communication and the University for Development. Between 1997 and 2001, she founded and formed a part of the Theatre Directors Association (Asociación de Directores de Teatro, ADT).

In television, of note is her performance in Cárcel de Mujeres ("Women's Prison") as Raquel, a role for which García received both an APES Award and the Altazor Award for best actress.

In 2002, García received an Andes Foundation grant to undertake research on conjugal violence, Golpes extraños al amor ("Blows outside love"), which led to the work Peso negro ("Dark weight"), selected for the Unipersonales de Galpón 7 Festival, and Frágil ("Fragile"), a work presented at Matucana 100 Cultural Center under her direction.

In film, García debuted in the 2002 movie Tres noches de un sábado ("Three nights of one Saturday") by Joaquín Eyzaguirre, receiving a nomination for the Altazor Awards for her interpretation of the character Mathilde. She also appeared in the 2004 film Cachimba ("Hookah") by Silvio Caiozzi, in Casa de remolienda ("Party house") by Eyzaguirre in 2007, and in Gloria, by Sebastián Lelio, for which she received the Silver Bear for Best Actress at the Berlin International Film Festival.

== Filmography ==
=== Films ===
Year	Title	Role	Notes
2002	Tres noches de un sábado	Mathilde	Directed by Joaquín Eyzaguirre; Nominated—Altazor Awards Best Actress for Cinema
2004	Cachimba	Antoinette Doublé	Directed by Silvio Caiozzi
2004	Mónica, vida mía	Noemí	Television film
2007	Casa de remolienda	Doña Rebeca	Directed by Joaquín Eyzaguirre
2012	Bahía azul		Directed by Nicolás Acuña
2012	El muro	Former Minister for Culture	Directed by Paula Bravo
2013	Gloria	Gloria Cumplido	Directed by Sebastián Lelio; Altazor Award for Best Actress; Silver Bear for Best Actress at the Berlin International Film Festival; Hawaii International Film Festival Award for Best Actress; Pedro Sienna Award for Best Actress; Nominated–Guardian Film Award for Best Actor
2013	Illiterate	Ximena	Directed by Moisés Sepúlveda; Kikito for Best Actress at the Festival de Cinema de Gramado - Brazil
2014	Voice Over	Matilda	Directed by Cristián Jiménez
2015	The 33	Isabel Pereira, assistant to President Piñera	Directed by Patricia Riggen
2016	Aquí no ha pasado nada	Roxana	Directed by Alejandro Fernández Almendras
2016	Little Men	Leonor Calvelli	Directed by Ira Sachs; Nominated – Independent Spirit Award for Best Supporting Female
2017	The Desert Bride	Teresa Godoy	Directed by Cecilia Atán and Valeria Pivato
2017	The Summit	Paula Sherson, President of Chile	Directed by Santiago Mitre
2019	Blood Will Tell	Adriana, the mother	Directed by Miguel Cohan
2019	Some Beasts	Dolores	Directed by Jorge Riquelme Serrano
2021	My Brothers Dream Awake	Professor Ana	Directed by Claudia Huaiquimilla
2023	Milonga	Rosa	Directed by Laura González
2024	Beloved Tropic	Mercedes	Directed by Ana Endara

=== Television ===
Year	Title	Role	Notes
1984	Los títeres	Adriana Godán	
1986	La villa	Eliana "Eli"	
1987	La invitación	Laura del Solar	
1989	A la sombra del ángel	Edith	
1989	Los Venegas	Jefa de Guillermo	Televised series (Season 1)
1990	El milagro de vivir	María Pía Santillán	
2003	JPT: Justicia Para Todos	Catalina	Episode: "Tráfico de órganos" (Season 2)
2006	Huaiquimán y Tolosa	Doña Berta	Episode: "¿La mafia rusa?" (Season 1)
2007	Héroes	María Encarnación de Fernández y Palazuelos	Episode: "Portales, la fuerza de los hechos"
2007–08	Cárcel de Mujeres	Raquel "La Raco" Reina	Winner—Altazor Awards
2010	Los simuladores	Marcela	Episode: "El secreto de Marcela" (Season 2)
2011	Los archivos del cardenal	Mónica Spencer	
2015	Narcos	Hermilda Gaviria	
2018	Matar al padre	Isabel	

== Theatre ==
=== Actress ===
- ¿Dónde estará la Jeanette?, comedy by Luis Rivano
- Cariño malo, by Inés Stranger; dir.: Claudia Echenique; 1990; 2012
- Malasangre, dir.: Mauricio Celedón, 1991
- El tío Vania, by Anton Chekhov; dir.: Raúl Osorio, 1994
- El lugar común
- Inocencia, by Dea Loher; dir.: Luis Ureta; Muestra de Dramaturgia Europea, 2004
- En la Sangre, by Suzan-Lori Parks; dir.: Carlos Osorio; interprets Hester, a beggar; Centro Cultural Matucana 100, 2004
- Déjala sangrar, by Benjamín Galemiri, dir.: Adel Hakim; interprets Virna Vigo; 2005
- El último fuego, by Dea Loer; dir.: Luis Ureta; April 2009
- Gertrudis, el grito, by Howard Barker, dir.: Marcos Guzmán; 9th Festival of Contemporary European Theatre in Santiago, August 2009
- Las analfabetas, by Pablo Paredes, 2010
- Fábula del niño y los animales que se mueren, free version of Euripides The Trojan Women by Pablo Paredes; dir.: Isidora Stevenson; García interprets queen Hecuba; La Nacional company in Matucana 100, 6–15 January 2012

=== Director ===
- El continente negro, by Marco Antonio de la Parra; 1996
- Lucrecia y Judith, by Marco Antonio de la Parra
- Recordando con ira, by John Osborne (Look Back in Anger in English)
- Anhelo del corazón, by Caryl Churchill ("A Heart's Desire"); Muestra de Dramaturgia Europea, 2004
- El neoproceso, work by Benjamín Galemiri inspired by Kafka, premiere: 15 July 2006
- La gran noche, by Marcelo Simonetti; premiere: 28 May 2008, Centro Mori in Vitacura
- Apoteosis final: BBB up, Santiago a Mil, January 2009
- Orates, by Jaime Lorca; premiere: 4 November 2010
- La mantis religiosa, by Alejandro Sieveking, La Palomera theatre, premiere: 9 June 2011
- Cerca de Moscú, adaptation by Pablo Paredes of two pieces by Chekhov: Platonov and Ivanov; Santiago a Mil International Festival 2013

=== Playwright ===
- Peso negro
- Frágil, 2002; premiered and directed by García in 2003.

== Awards and nominations ==
=== APES Award ===
Year	Award	Category	Work	Result
1983	Best Actress	Theatre	¿Dónde estará la Jeanette?	Won
1996	Best Director	Theatre	El continente negro	Nominated
2008	Best Actress	Television	Cárcel de Mujeres	Won

=== Altazor Awards ===
Year	Award	Category	Work	Result
2003	Best Actress	Film	Tres noches de un sábado	Nominated
2005	Best Actress	Theatre	En la Sangre	Won
2008	Best Actress	Television	Cárcel de Mujeres	Won
2009	Best Actress	Television	Cárcel de Mujeres 2	Nominated

=== Silver Bear for Best Actress ===
Year	Award	Category	Work	Result
2013	Silver Bear for Best Actress	Film	Gloria	Won

=== Platino Awards ===
Year	Award	Category	Work	Result
2014	Best Actress	Film	Gloria	Won

=== Festival de Cinema de Gramado - Brazil ===
Year	Award	Category	Work	Result
2014	Kikito for Best Actress	Film	Illiterate	Won

=== ACCU Awards (Asociación de Críticos de Cine de Uruguay) ===
Year	Award	Category	Work	Result
2023	Best Actress	Film	Milonga	Won
