= History and Geography (film) =

- Theatrical release poster
- Directed by: Bernardo Quesney
- Written by: Bernardo Quesney; Simón Soto; Valeria Hernández
- Produced by: Tomas Alzamora; Pablo Calisto; Bernardo Quesney
- Starring: Amparo Noguera
- Cinematography: Matías Illanes
- Edited by: Valeria Hernández
- Music by: Martín Schlotfeldt
- Production company: Equeco
- Distributed by: Storyboard Media
- Release dates: August 24, 2023 (SANFIC); April 18, 2024 (Chile)
- Running time: 90 minutes
- Country: Chile
- Languages: Spanish; Haitian Creole

History and Geography (Spanish: Historia y geografía) is a 2023 Chilean comedy film co-written, co-produced and directed by Bernardo Quesney. Starring Amparo Noguera accompanied by Catalina Saavedra, Pablo Schwarz, Paloma Moreno, Paulina Urrutia and Steevens Benjamin. It is about a remembered comedy television actress who decides to return to her hometown to put on a play with the purpose of recovering the artistic recognition that she thought she had lost, but never had.

== Synopsis ==
Gioconda Martínez is a beloved television comic actress who decides to return to her native San Felipe to stage a play based on La Araucana. In the process, she seeks to bury her past as "La Huachita," a character that brought her significant television popularity during the civil-military dictatorship.

== Cast ==
- Amparo Noguera as Gioconda Martínez
- Catalina Saavedra as Atenea
- Pablo Schwarz
- Paloma Moreno
- Paulina Urrutia
- Steevens Benjamin

== Production ==
Principal photography was scheduled to begin on April 4, 2020, but was delayed until December of the same year due to the COVID-19 pandemic. It was filmed primarily in San Felipe, Chile.

== Release ==
The film had its world premiere on August 24, 2023, at the 19th Santiago International Film Festival, then screened on November 8, 2023, at the 9th La Serena International Film Festival, on January 22, 2024, at the 16th Chilean Film Festival, on April 24, 2024, at the 25th Buenos Aires International Festival of Independent Cinema and on August 10, 2024, at the 28th Lima Film Festival. It had its commercial premiere on April 18, 2024, in Chilean theaters.

== Accolades ==
Year	Award / Festival	Category	Recipient	Result	Ref.
2023	19th Santiago International Film Festival	Chilean Film Competition - Best Picture	History and Geography	Nominated	
2023	19th Santiago International Film Festival	Best Director	Bernardo Quesney	Won	
2023	19th Santiago International Film Festival	Best Performance	Amparo Noguera	Won (Note: Tied with Sister & Sister)	
2024	16th Chilean Film Festival	Feature Film Competition - Best Performance	Amparo Noguera	Won	
2024	12nd Antofagasta International Film Festival	Best National Feature Film	History and Geography	Won	
2024	28th Lima Film Festival	Best Picture	History and Geography	Nominated	
2025	9th Caleuche Awards	Best Leading Actress	Amparo Noguera	Nominated	
2025	9th Caleuche Awards	Best Supporting Actress	Catalina Saavedra	Won	
