= Illiterate (film) =

2013 drama film from Chile

- Chilean theatrical release poster
- Directed by: Moisés Sepúlveda
- Written by: Moisés Sepúlveda, Pablo Paredes
- Starring: Paulina García, Valentina Muhr
- Cinematography: Arnaldo Rodríguez
- Music by: Cristóbal Carvajal
- Release dates: 6 September 2013 (Venice); 26 August 2013 (Santiago)
- Running time: 73 minutes
- Country: Chile
- Language: Spanish

Illiterate (Spanish: Las analfabetas) is a 2013 Chilean drama film directed by Moisés Sepúlveda.The script was written by Sepúlveda and Pablo Paredes, based on Paredes' own play. It was selected to be screened out of competition closing the Critics Week section at the 2013 Venice Film Festival, and at the 2013 SANFIC it won Best Chilean Picture and the Public Prize.

== Plot ==
Ximena is a middle-aged woman who lives alone in her apartment, completely oblivious to the world around her due to her illiteracy, a condition that deeply embarrasses her. With little conviction, Ximena accepts the help of Jackeline, a young woman with a teaching degree, who agrees to teach her how to read. Ximena's motivation for learning is to finally be able to read a letter left to her by her father as his only memento.

As their relationship progresses, the two women embark on a mutual journey of learning that goes beyond the topic of reading. The story sheds light on the idea that being illiterate is more than just not knowing how to read and extends beyond a single individual.

== Cast ==
- Paulina García
- Valentina Muhr
