= Forgotten Roads =

La nave del olvido
- Film poster
- Directed by: Nicol Ruiz Benavides
- Written by: Nicol Ruiz Benavides
- Produced by: Nicol Ruiz Benavides; Catalina Fontecilla; Sebastián Radic; Víctor Rojas
- Starring: Rosa Ramírez; Romana Satt
- Cinematography: Víctor Rojas
- Edited by: Mayra Moran
- Music by: Santiago Jara
- Production company: Alen Cine
- Distributed by: Outplay Films (France)
- Release dates: September 17, 2020 (Frameline Film Festival); January 13, 2022 (Chile)
- Running time: 71 minutes
- Country: Chile
- Language: Spanish

Forgotten Roads (Spanish: La nave del olvido, lit. 'The Ship of Oblivion') is a 2020 Chilean romantic drama film written and directed by Nicol Ruiz Benavides in her directorial debut. Starring Rosa Ramírez Ríos and Romana Satt.

== Synopsis ==
After the death of her husband, 70-year-old Claudina has to start over and she moves in with her daughter and grandson. She has a strained relationship with her daughter, but she is very fond of her grandchild. Before long, she meets and instantly falls in love with her neighbour Elsa.

== Cast ==
The actors participating in this film are:

- Rosa Ramírez as Claudina
- Romana Satt as Elsa
- Gabriela Arancibia as Alejandra
- Claudia Devia as Ignacia
- Raúl López Leyton as Facundo/Ambrosia
- Cristóbal Ruiz as Cristóbal
- María Carrillo as Marcela
- María José Benavides as Marina
- Hugo Chamorro as Eugenio
- Gunther Butter as Marcela's Husband

== Production ==
In 2016, filming began in the town of Lautaro, Ninth Region, with a duration of 16 days for its completion.

== Release ==
Forgotten Roads premiered in the US at the San Francisco International LGBT Film Festival on September 17, 2020. and in August 2021 at the Santiago SANFIC International Film Festival in Chile. It premiered on January 13, 2022, in Peruvian theaters.

== Awards ==
Year	Award	Category	Receptor	Result
2020	Chéries-Chéris	Best Actor/Actress	Rosa Ramírez	Won
2020	Huelva Ibero-American Film Festival	Best Film with a Genre Perspective	Forgotten Roads	Won
2020	Huelva Ibero-American Film Festival	Best Director	Nicol Ruiz Benavides	Won
2020	Image+Nation Festival Cinema LGBT Montreal Film Festival	Audience Award	Forgotten Roads	Won
2020	Zinegoak	Best Film	Forgotten Roads	Won
2020	Zinegoak	Best Feature Film	Forgotten Roads	Won
2021	KASHISH Mumbai International Queer Film Festival	Best Feature Narrative	Nicol Ruiz Benavides	Won
2021	OutfestPerú	Best Film	Forgotten Roads	Won
2021	Roze Filmdagen Amsterdam	Best Feature Film (special mention)	Forgotten Roads	Won
2021	Santiago International Film Festival	Best Director - National Competition	Nicol Ruiz Benavides	Won
2021	Viña del Mar International Film Festival	Best Chilean Film	Forgotten Roads	Nominated
