= Family Album (2024 Peruvian film) =

- Theatrical release poster
- Directed by: Joel Calero
- Written by: Joel Calero
- Produced by: Joel Calero; Carolina Herrera
- Starring: Emanuel Soriano
- Cinematography: Rodrigo Llano
- Edited by: Roberto Benavides
- Production companies: Bhakti Films; Factoría Sur Producciones
- Release dates: August 10, 2024 (Lima); September 17, 2026 (Peru)
- Running time: 94 minutes
- Countries: Peru; Colombia
- Languages: Spanish; Quechua

Family Album (Spanish: Álbum de familia) is a 2024 drama film written, co-produced and directed by Joel Calero. Starring Emanuel Soriano accompanied by Camila Ferrer, María Fernanda Valera, Natalia Torres Vilar and Lucho Cáceres. It is the third and final installment of Calero's memory trilogy, following One Last Afternoon (2016) and The Most Feared Skin (2023).

== Synopsis ==
Alex, soon to become a father, discovers a dark family album that reveals secrets of infidelity, violence, and a past marked by the Internal Armed Conflict.

== Cast ==
- Emanuel Soriano as Alex
- Maria Fernanda Valera as Titi
- Camila Ferrer as Marina
- Lucho Cáceres as Germán
- Natalia Torres Vilar as Susana
- Paulina Tacac as Sabina
- Rocío Limo as Rocío
- Mariano Ramirez as Joaquín
- Marcela Duque as Aura
- Melvin Quijada as Rómulo
- Rodrigo Palacios as Jorge
- Katerina D'onofrio as Patricia

== Release ==
Family Album had its premiere on August 10, 2024, at the 28th Lima Film Festival, and was screened on November 9, 2024, at the 10th University of Lima Film Week.

The film is scheduled for commercial release on September 17, 2026 in Peruvian theaters.

== Accolades ==
Year	Award / Festival	Category	Recipient	Result	Ref.
2024	28th Lima Film Festival	Peruvian Competition - Best Film	Family Album	Nominated	
2025	16th APRECI Awards	Best Leading Actor	Emanuel Soriano	Nominated	
2025	16th APRECI Awards	Best Supporting Actor	Lucho Cáceres	Nominated	
