= Casa de remolienda =

- Theatrical release poster
- Directed by: Joaquín Eyzaguirre
- Screenplay by: Cynthia Rimsky; Gonzalo San Martín
- Based on: La Remolienda by Alejandro Sieveking
- Produced by: Carmen Pantoja; Jorge Benítez
- Starring: Amparo Noguera; Alfredo Castro; Tamara Acosta; Daniel Muñoz
- Cinematography: David Bravo
- Edited by: Sophie França
- Music by: Andreas Bodenhöfer
- Production company: Cinembargo Comunicaciones Cine Televisión
- Release date: August 30, 2007
- Running time: 100 minutes
- Country: Chile
- Language: Spanish

Casa de remolienda (lit. 'Regrind house') is a 2007 Chilean drama film directed by Joaquín Eyzaguirre and written by Cynthia Rimsky & Gonzalo San Martín. Starring Amparo Noguera, Alfredo Castro, Tamara Acosta and Daniel Muñoz. It is based on the play La Remolienda by Alejandro Sieveking. It premiered on August 30, 2007, in Chilean theaters.

== Synopsis ==
In the 50s, in a town in the south of Chile, a recently widowed peasant woman decides to go down to the town to marry her 3 children. His sister lives in the village, whom he has not seen for 20 years. The latter, Rebeca, has a house regrind affair that Nicolasa is unaware of. Rebeca has 3 young prostitutes whom she decides to dress as young ladies who are housed in this supposed boarding house. Electric light is being installed in town, an obvious symbol of progress, and the engineer in charge is Renato, an old love of Rebeca's, whom he abandoned 20 years ago.

== Cast ==
The actors participating in this film are:

- Amparo Noguera as Nicolasa
- Paulina García as Rebeca
- Tamara Acosta as María Mercedes (Ronca)
- Luz Valdivieso as Isaura
- Daniel Muñoz as Valentín
- Alfredo Castro as Renato
- Daniela Lhorente as Yola
- Claudio Arredondo as Oscar Badilla
- Francisca Eyzaguirre as Chepa
- Luis Gnecco as Mauricio Valdebenito
- Claudio Valenzuela as Remolacha Sanhueza
- Álvaro Espinoza as Graciano Morales
- Andrés Eyzaguirre as Nicolás Morales
- Luis Bravo as Gilberto Morales
- Carlos Belmar as Drunk Sad
- Wilson Fuentes as Employee
- Osvaldo Salom as Don Eutanasio (Matarifé)
- Jorge Topp as Don Chalo
- Consuelo Castillo as Prostitute 2
- Pamela Pacheco as Prostitute 3
- Carlos Montenegro as Employee at Casa de Remolienda
- Loreto Vuskovic as Bar Waitress

== Reception ==
=== Box-office ===
In its first week on the billboard it debuted in third place, attracting 14,465 viewers increasing to 26,077 viewers in its second week, displacing The Simpsons Movie. In its third week, it continued to lead by raising $40,992. For its fourth week, the film attracted 13,887 viewers for a total of 50,970 viewers. After 11 weeks on the billboard, it caught a total of 74.244 viewers, collecting $176.532.660 Chilean pesos, becoming the fourth most successful national film of that year.

=== Accolades ===
Year	Award / Festival	Category	Recipient	Result	Ref.
2008	Pedro Sienna Awards	Best Picture	Casa de remolienda	Nominated	
2008	Pedro Sienna Awards	Best Actress	Amparo Noguera	Nominated	
2008	Pedro Sienna Awards	Best Actress	Paulina Garcia	Nominated	
2008	Pedro Sienna Awards	Best Cinematography	David Bravo	Won	
2008	Pedro Sienna Awards	Best Art Direction	Hugo Tripodi	Won	
2008	Pedro Sienna Awards	Best Costume Design	Loreto Vuskovic	Won	
2008	Pedro Sienna Awards	Best Makeup	Taly Waisberg	Nominated	
