= Bettina Perut =

Chilean journalist

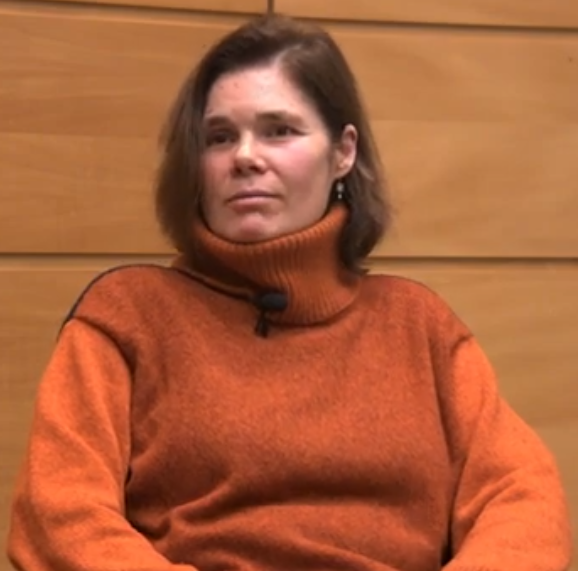
- In a 2022 interview
- Born: Elisabetta Perut Bozzolo; 25 February 1970 (age 56); Rome, Italy
- Occupation: Filmmaker
- Years active: 1997–present
- Website: perutosnovikoff.com

Elisabetta Perut Bozzolo (born 25 February 1970) is a Chilean journalist, film director, producer, and screenwriter best known for the documentaries Un hombre aparte and La muerte de Pinochet. Both of these were made in collaboration with Iván Osnovikoff, a director with whom she has done most of her audiovisual work in the documentary field.

== Career ==
Most of Perut's filmography has been made with Osnovikoff. Her first work was Chi-chi-chi-le-le-le. Martín Vargas de Chile in 2000, which won Best Film at the Valparaíso Film Festival and Best Research at the Santiago Documentary Festival in 2001. This was followed by Un hombre aparte (2001) – which won the jury prize for Best Experimental Documentary at the Havana Film Festival – El Astuto Mono Pinochet Contra La Moneda de los Cerdos (2004), and Welcome to New York (2006), the latter of which was nominated for a Pedro Sienna Award for Best Short and Documentary Short Film. In 2009, Noticias was released, winning Best Experimental Documentary at the Parnü IDF in Estonia. La muerte de Pinochet (2011) received a special award from the Santiago International Film Festival jury.

In addition, Perut has won three Altazor Awards: two in 2002 in the categories Best Direction and Best Creative Contribution, and one in 2007 for Best Direction in Documentary Film. She received a nomination in the same category in 2012.

== Filmography ==
Logo of La muerte de Pinochet (2011)

Year	Title	Genre
2000	Chi-chi-chi-le-le-le. Martín Vargas de Chile	Documentary
2001	Un hombre aparte	Documentary
2004	El astuto mono Pinochet contra la moneda de los cerdos	Documentary
2006	Welcome to New York	Fiction documentary
2009	Noticias	Documentary
2011	La muerte de Pinochet	Documentary

== Awards and nominations ==
Year	Award	Work	Category	Result	Ref
2002	Havana Film Festival	Un hombre aparte	Jury Award for Best Experimental Documentary	Winner	
2002	Altazor Award	Un hombre aparte	Creative Contribution	Winner	
2002	Altazor Award	Un hombre aparte	Film Direction	Winner	
2003	Barcelona Docúpolis Festival	Un hombre aparte	Docúpolis Award for Best Documentary	Winner	
2007	Altazor Award	Welcome to New York	Direction in Documentary Film	Winner	
2011	Warsaw International Film Festival	La muerte de Pinochet	Best Documentary	Nominated	
2012	Altazor Award	La muerte de Pinochet	Documentary Direction	Nominated	
