= Affections (film) =

- Theatrical release poster
- Spanish: Los afectos
- Directed by: Diego Ayala; Aníbal Jofré
- Written by: Diego Ayala; Aníbal Jofré
- Produced by: Francisca Mery; Valentina Roblero
- Starring: Gastón Salgado
- Cinematography: Paolo Tamburini
- Edited by: Camila Mercadal
- Music by: Gianluca Abarza; Sara Hebe
- Production companies: Orioncine; Incuproyet
- Release dates: August 22, 2024 (SANFIC); December 12, 2024 (Chile)
- Running time: 81 minutes
- Countries: Chile; Ecuador
- Language: Spanish

Affections (Spanish: Los afectos) is a 2024 musical drama film written and directed by Diego Ayala and Aníbal Jofré. An international co-production between Chile and Ecuador, the film stars Gastón Salgado as a school inspector who witnesses the police assault his teenage daughter amid a wave of protests.

== Synopsis ==
Benjamín is a divorced school inspector who maintains a poor relationship with his ex-partner and a distant one with his teenage daughter. However, he finds himself under pressure when his daughter Karina transfers to the school where he works, as he must decide whether to follow the school administration's dirty instructions or get involved in the student protests in which his daughter participates.

== Cast ==
- Gastón Salgado as Benjamín
- Gianluca Abarza
- Catalina Ríos
- María Paz Grandjan
- Claudia Cabezas
- Sara Hebe
- Gonzalo Robles
- Rodrigo Pérez

== Release ==
The film had its world premiere on August 22, 2024, at the 20th Santiago International Film Festival, to then commercially released on December 12, 2024, in Chilean theaters.

== Accolades ==
Year	Award / Festival	Category	Recipient	Result	Ref.
2024	20th Santiago International Film Festival	Chilean Competition – Best Film	Affections	Nominated	
2024	20th Santiago International Film Festival	Best Performance	Gastón Salgado	Won	
2024	20th Rengo International Film Festival	Best International Fiction Feature Film	Affections	Nominated	
2024	20th Rengo International Film Festival	Best Direction in an International Feature Film Fiction	Diego Ayala, Aníbal Jofré	Won	
2024	20th Rengo International Film Festival	Best Performance in an International Feature Film	Gastón Salgado	Won	
