= Through Rocks and Clouds =

- Theatrical release poster
- Directed by: Franco García Becerra
- Written by: Annemarie Gunkel; Alicia Quispe
- Produced by: Diego Sarmiento; Jorge Constantino; Annemarie Gunkel; Franco García
- Starring: Alberth Merma
- Cinematography: Johan Carrasco
- Edited by: Franco García Becerra; Juan Francisco González
- Music by: Daniel Castro
- Production companies: Desfase Films; Mestizo Studios; Wayqicha Cine; Luna Roja Relatos Audiovisuales; Tierra en Trance Films
- Distributed by: Luxbox Films
- Release dates: February 19, 2024 (Berlinale); October 16, 2025 (Peru)
- Running time: 82 minutes
- Countries: Peru; Chile
- Languages: Quechua; Spanish

Through Rocks and Clouds (Spanish: Raíz, lit. 'Root') is a 2024 drama film directed by Franco García Becerra and written by Annemarie Gunkel and Alicia Quispe. A co-production between Peru and Chile, the film stars Quechua-speaker Alberth Merma accompanied by Nely Huayta and Richard Taipe. It is about a shepherd boy who dreams of seeing his country in the 2018 FIFA World Cup while his environment is threatened by pollution from a mining company.

== Synopsis ==
Feliciano is an 8-year-old boy who is in charge of herding sheep. He is accompanied by Ronaldo, a young alpaca, and Rambo, an old dog with whom he can start conversations about football and the national team's matches to qualify for the 2018 FIFA World Cup. However, their environment is threatened by a contaminated lake because a mining company wants to take over those lands. One day Ronaldo disappears along with other alpacas, the authorities ignore the requests for help, so Feliciano will seek to find his Ronaldo while the town unites to take action against the company.

== Cast ==
- Alberth Merma as Feliciano
- Nely Huayta
- Richard Taipe
- José Merma
- Deyvis Mayo
- Rubén Huillca
- Ruperta Condori

== Production ==
Principal photography began in October 2022 in the province of Quispicanchis in Cusco, Peru.

== Release ==
Through Rocks and Clouds had its world premiere on February 19, 2024, in the Generation Kplus section at the 74th Berlin International Film Festival, then screened on April 17, 2024, at the 63rd Cartagena Film Festival, on August 8, 2024, at the 77th Locarno Film Festival, on August 9, 2024, at the 28th Lima Film Festival, on the August 19, 2024, at the 20th Santiago International Film Festival, and on October 23, 2024, at the 12th Bosphorus Film Festival. International rights were acquired by Luxbox Films.

The film is scheduled for commercial release on October 16, 2025, in Peruvian theaters.

== Reception ==
=== Critical reception ===
On the review aggregator website Rotten Tomatoes, 40% of 10 critics' reviews are positive, with an average rating of 5.0/10.

=== Accolades ===
Award	Date	Category	Recipient	Result	Ref.
Berlin International Film Festival	25 February 2024	Grand Prix for Best Film in Generation Kplus	Through Rocks and Clouds	Nominated	
Berlin International Film Festival	25 February 2024	Generation International Jury – Special Mention	Through Rocks and Clouds	Won	
Seattle International Film Festival	19 May 2024	Ibero-American Competition – Grand Jury Prize	Through Rocks and Clouds	Won	
Lima Film Festival	17 August 2024	Best Picture	Through Rocks and Clouds	Nominated	
Lima Film Festival	17 August 2024	Best Director	Franco García Becerra	Won	
Santiago International Film Festival	25 August 2024	Chilean Competition – Best Film	Through Rocks and Clouds	Nominated	
Santiago International Film Festival	25 August 2024	Special Jury Mention	Through Rocks and Clouds	Won	
Biarritz Film Festival	27 September 2024	Coup de Cœur Award	Through Rocks and Clouds	Won	
Bosphorus Film Festival	25 October 2024	International Competition - Best Film	Through Rocks and Clouds	Nominated	
Bosphorus Film Festival	25 October 2024	Special Jury Prize	Alberth Merma	Won	
