= The Daughter of the Moon =

- Theatrical release poster
- Directed by: César Galindo
- Written by: César Galindo
- Produced by: César Galindo
- Starring: Carolina Luján
- Cinematography: Juan Durán
- Edited by: Leonel Galindo
- Music by: César Vega
- Production company: Leoces Films
- Distributed by: V&R Films
- Release dates: August 9, 2024 (Lima); January 29, 2026 (Peru)
- Running time: 87 minutes
- Country: Peru
- Language: Quechua

The Daughter of the Moon (Quechua: Killapa Wawan) is a 2024 Quechua-language Peruvian fantasy drama film written, produced and directed by César Galindo. It stars Carolina Luján as a 13-year-old aspiring scissor dancer who must confront Lucifer. The rest of the cast includes Magaly Solier, Reynaldo Arenas, and Andrés “Chimango” Lares.

== Synopsis ==
Killari, a 13-year-old girl chosen by the spirits of her guardian deities, defies her mother's wishes as she learns the ancient scissors dance from her grandfather.

== Cast ==
- Carolina Luján as Killari
- Magaly Solier as Agucha
- Reynaldo Arenas
- Andrés 'Chimango' Lares

== Release ==
The Daughter of the Moon had its world premiere on August 9, 2024, at the 28th Lima Film Festival. It was presented incomplete and with unfinished special effects, which director César Galindo acknowledged was a mistake.

The film was released commercially on January 29, 2026, in Peruvian theaters.

== Accolades ==
| Award / Festival | Date of ceremony | Category | Recipient(s) | Result | Ref. |
|---|---|---|---|---|---|
| Lima Film Festival | 17 August 2024 | Peruvian Competition - Best Film | The Daughter of the Moon | Nominated | |
