= Oasis (2024 film) =

- Theatrical release poster
- Directed by: Felipe Morgado; Tamara Uribe
- Written by: Felipe Morgado; Tamara Uribe
- Produced by: Alba Gaviraghi; Diego Pino Anguita
- Cinematography: Adolfo Mesías
- Edited by: Andrea Chignoli; Christopher Murray; Felipe Morgado; Tamara Uribe
- Production company: Fundación MAFI
- Release dates: February 19, 2024 (Berlinale); November 7, 2024 (Chile)
- Running time: 80 minutes
- Country: Chile
- Language: Spanish

Oasis (released in theaters as Oasis, el mejor país de Chile, lit. 'Oasis, the best country in Chile') is a 2024 Chilean documentary film written, co-edited and directed by Felipe Morgado and Tamara Uribe. It is the third feature film produced by the MAFI collective, which exposes the Chilean political climate from the social outburst to the present day.

The film was selected for the Forum section at the 74th Berlin International Film Festival, where it had its world premiere on 19 February 2024, competing for the Berlinale Documentary Film Award.

== Synopsis ==
After an unprecedented social uprising, Chile chooses to write a new constitution. A diverse assembly will be tasked with putting the dreams of dignity and social justice of an entire people on paper. What could possibly go wrong?

== Production ==
Principal photography was filmed by 17 filmmakers over the course of five years throughout Chile.

== Release ==
Oasis had its world premiere on February 19, 2024, in the Forum section of the 74th Berlin International Film Festival, then screened on March 18, 2024, at the 21st Copenhagen International Documentary Film Festival, on July 19, 2024, at the 27th Guanajuato International Film Festival, on mid-August 2024, at the 20th Santiago International Film Festival, and on September 13, 2024, at the 20th Camden International Film Festival.

The film was released commercially on November 7, 2024, in Chilean theaters.

== Accolades ==
| Year | Award / Festival | Category | Recipient | Result | Ref. |
|---|---|---|---|---|---|
| 2024 | 74th Berlin International Film Festival | Berlinale Documentary Film Award | Oasis | Nominated | |
| 2024 | 27th Guanajuato International Film Festival | Best International Documentary Feature Film | Oasis | Nominated | |
| 2024 | 27th Guanajuato International Film Festival | Special Jury Mention | Oasis | Won | |
| 2024 | 31st Biarritz Latin American Festival | Best Documentary | Oasis | Won | |
