= Blood Will Tell (2019 film) =

2019 film directed by Miguel Cohan

- Film poster
- Directed by: Miguel Cohan
- Written by: Ana Cohan; Miguel Cohan
- Produced by: John Benitz; Christian Faillace; Sebastian Freund; Juan Pablo Galli; Hernán Musaluppi; Walter Rippel; Santiago López Rodríguez; Juan Vera
- Starring: Oscar Martínez; Paulina García; Dolores Fonzi
- Cinematography: Julián Apezteguia
- Edited by: Soledad Salfate
- Music by: Luca D'Alberto
- Production companies: Cimarron; Goodgate; Mackay Pictures; Patagonik Film Group; Rizoma Films; Wildhorse Studios
- Distributed by: Buena Vista International (Argentina); Netflix (International)
- Release date: 28 February 2019
- Running time: 113 minutes
- Country: Argentina
- Language: Spanish

Blood Will Tell (Spanish: La Misma Sangre) is a 2019 Argentine drama film directed by Miguel Cohan and written by Ana Cohan and Miguel Cohan. Released by Buena Vista International in Argentina on 28 February 2019, Blood Will Tell was released on Netflix on 29 June 2019 but was removed in June 2025.

== Premise ==
Family patriarch Elías begins to unravel after the death of his wife—which casts a suspicious light on her tragic accident.

— Netflix

== Cast ==
- Oscar Martínez as Elías / Father
- Paulina García as Adriana / Mother
- Dolores Fonzi as Carla / Adriana and Elías' daughter
- Diego Velázquez as Sebastián / Carla's husband
- Luis Gnecco as Lautaro
