= Children's rights in Chile =

Human rights of children in Chile

Children's rights in Chile are secured by a number of national initiatives supported at all levels of government.

== Background ==
In Chile education is universal, compulsory, and free from first through 12th grade. The latest government figures showed that in 2002 the median level of education was 10 years but varied regionally and across age groups. The World Bank reported that in 2004 more than 90 percent of school-age children attended school. Three-quarters of the population had completed primary education (eight years), and 61 percent had secondary education (12 years). The government provides basic health care through a public system, which includes regular checkups, vaccinations, and emergency health care. Boys and girls had equal access to health care.

Violence against children has been a problem in Chile. A 2003 study by the Citizens' Peace Foundation indicated that 60 percent of children surveyed between the ages of seven and 10 had suffered some type of aggression against them or their belongings either inside or outside their homes. A 2006 UNICEF study reported that 75 percent of 13- and 14-year-olds reported they were subject to some type of physical or psychological violence from one or both parents, including 26 percent who reported having suffered serious physical violence (e.g., beatings, cuts, and burns).

From January to November, the Public Ministry reported 197 cases of commercial juvenile sexual exploitation, compared with 195 cases in all of 2005. Since June 2003 the government's National Children's Service (SENAME) has assisted more than 2,100 victims of commercial juvenile sexual exploitation. SENAME, the Carabineros, and PICH worked together, along with schools and NGOs, to identify children in abusive situations, provide abused children with counseling and other social services, and keep families intact.

Child prostitution in Chile has been a problem, as well as child labor in the informal economy.
