= Aurora (2014 film) =

2014 film directed by Rodrigo Sepúlveda

- Directed by: Rodrigo Sepúlveda
- Written by: Rodrigo Sepúlveda
- Produced by: Florencia Larrea; Gregorio González; Josefina Undurraga
- Starring: Amparo Noguera, Luis Gnecco, Jaime Vadell, Francisco Pérez-Bannen, Mariana Loyola, Patricia Rivadeneira, Francisca Gavilán, María José Siebald
- Cinematography: Enrique Stindt
- Edited by: Andrea Chignoli, José Luis Torres Leiva
- Music by: Carlos Cabezas
- Production companies: Forastero and Caco
- Distributed by: Forastero
- Release date: October 2014 (Sanfic)
- Running time: 83 minutes
- Country: Chile
- Language: Spanish

Aurora is a 2014 Chilean drama film written and directed by Rodrigo Sepúlveda.

== Plot ==
The film is set in the town of Ventanas in the Valparaíso Region of Chile. Sofia (Amparo Noguera) is a local teacher going through the process of adopting a child when she reads in the news about a dead baby found in the local dump. Sofia becomes obsessed with the fate of the dead girl who she called "Aurora". The baby has no legal right to have a name or be buried, so Sofia initiates a legal process that becomes an intimate journey of personal transformation, with devastating consequences on her life.

The film is based on the life of Bernarda Gallardo.

== Cast ==
- Amparo Noguera as Sofía
- Luis Gnecco
- Jaime Vadell - Judge Águila
- Francisco Pérez-Bannen - Dr Schultz
- Mariana Loyola
- Patricia Rivadeneira
- María José Siebald
- Daniela Ramírez

== Awards ==
- Best Film, International Competition Santiago International Film Festival,

== Release dates ==
- USA, 2014 Miami International Film Festival)
- South Korea, 5 October 2014 (Busan International Film Festival)
- Chile, 2014 Santiago International Film Festival (Santiago Festival Internacional de Cine) or SANFIC.

== See also ==
- Cinema of Chile
- Santiago International Film Festival
- Amparo Noguera
- Busan International Film Festival
