= The Universal Theory =

2023 film by Timm Kröger

- Theatrical release poster
- German: Die Theorie von Allem
- Directed by: Timm Kröger
- Written by: Timm Kröger; Roderick Warich
- Produced by: Heino Deckert; Viktoria Stolpe; Timm Kröger; Tina Börner; Lixi Frank; David Bohun; Sarah Born; Rajko Jazbec; Dario Schoch
- Starring: Jan Bülow; Olivia Ross; Hanns Zischler; Gottfried Breitfuss; David Bennent; Philippe Graber
- Cinematography: Roland Stuprich
- Edited by: Jann Anderegg
- Music by: Diego Ramos Rodríguez
- Production companies: Ma.ja.de. Fiction; The Barricades; Panama Film; Catpics AG; ZDF/ARTE; Schweizer Radio und Fernsehen / SRG SSR
- Distributed by: Neue Visionen (Germany); Stadtkino (Austria); Filmcoopi (Switzerland)
- Release dates: 3 September 2023 (Venice); 26 October 2023 (Germany); 10 November 2023 (Austria); 1 February 2024 (Switzerland)
- Running time: 118 minutes
- Countries: Germany; Austria; Switzerland
- Languages: German; French; Swiss German
- Box office: $531,032

The Universal Theory (German: Die Theorie von Allem, lit. 'The Theory of Everything') is a 2023 mystery thriller film directed by Timm Kröger, from a screenplay written by Kröger with Roderick Warich.

The film was selected to compete for the Golden Lion at the 80th Venice International Film Festival, where it premiered on 3 September 2023. It was theatrically released in Germany on 26 October 2023.

== Plot ==
In 1962, physicist Johannes Leinert travels with his doctoral supervisor to a scientific congress in the Swiss Alps. It is there that he meets Karin Hönig, a French-speaking jazz pianist, who is suspiciously knowledgeable about Johannes. A series of mysterious deaths occur at the mountainous site, and the two venture to uncover the secrets hidden below. The story includes an Iranian guest, a strange cloud formation in the sky and quantum mechanics.

== Cast ==
- Jan Bülow as Johannes Leinert
- Olivia Ross as Karin Hönig
- Hanns Zischler as Dr. Julius Strathen
- Gottfried Breitfuss as Professor Blumberg
- David Bennent as Kommissar Arnold
- Philippe Graber as Kommissar Amrein
- Ladina Carla von Frisching as Susi (adult)
- Imogen Kogge as Anna Leinert
- Emanuel Waldburg-Zeil as Johnny
- Vivienne Bayley as Susi (child)
- Dirk Böhling as Moderator
- Paul Wolff-Plottegg as Dr. Martin Koch
- Peter Hottinger as Empfangschef
- Dana Herfurth as Minna
- Joey Zimmermann as Polizeibeamter
- Eva Maria Jost as Anna Leinert Jung
- Jonathan Wirtz as Johannes (child)

== Production ==
The Universal Theory was produced by Germany's Ma.ja.de. Fiction and The Barricades, in co-production with Austria's Panama Film and Switzerland's Catpics AG. Principal photography began in January 2022 at the ski resort of St. Jakob in Defereggen, Austria. The film was shot in black-and-white using CinemaScope. Filming was projected to wrap at the end of February.

== Music ==
Diego Ramos Rodriguez composed the film's score, with additional music from David Schweighart and Viola Hammer. Oscilloscope Laboratories released the soundtrack in December 2023. A limited edition vinyl was released in August 2024.

=== Track listing ===
No.	Title	Length
1.	"Prologue"	3:17
2.	"Departure"	2:24
3.	"The Train to the Alps"	2:12
4.	"In the Chapel"	3:00
5.	"Johanina"	3:26
6.	"Professor Blumberg"	5:20
7.	"On the Ski Slope"	3:59
8.	"Blumberg's Corpse"	4:16
9.	"Interlude - Karin's Theme"	4:28
10.	"Homecoming"	2:07
11.	"Mistrust and Separation"	3:36
12.	"Johnny Shows the Way"	8:33
13.	"Where is Karin?"	7:33
14.	"Under Suspicion"	4:14
15.	"The Chase"	1:27
16.	"Epilogue"	9:28
Total length:		69:20

== Release ==
The Universal Theory was selected to compete for the Golden Lion at the 80th Venice International Film Festival, where it had its world premiere on 3 September 2023. International sales were handled by Paris-based company Charades. In early October 2023, it was announced that Oscilloscope Laboratories had acquired U.S. distribution rights. The film was theatrically released in Germany by Neue Visionen on 26 October 2023. Stadtkino Filmverleih released the film in Austria on 10 November 2023. Filmcoopi Zürich released the film in Switzerland on 1 February 2024.

== Reception ==
=== Critical response ===
On the review aggregator website Rotten Tomatoes, the film holds an approval rating of 70% based on 30 reviews. Metacritic, which uses a weighted average, assigned the film a score of 61 out of 100, based on 11 critics, indicating "generally favorable" reviews.

=== Accolades ===
Award	Date of ceremony	Category	Recipient(s)	Result	Ref.
Chicago International Film Festival	22 October 2023	Gold Hugo	The Universal Theory	Nominated	
German Film Awards	3 May 2024	Best Film	The Universal Theory	Nominated	
German Film Awards	3 May 2024	Best Director	Timm Kröger	Nominated	
German Film Awards	3 May 2024	Best Cinematography	Roland Stuprich	Won	
German Film Awards	3 May 2024	Best Score	Diego Ramos Rodríguez	Nominated	
German Film Awards	3 May 2024	Best Production Design	Cosima Vellenzer, Anika Klatt	Won	
German Film Awards	3 May 2024	Best Visual Effects	Kariem Saleh, Adrian Meyer	Won	
German Film Critics Association Awards	18 February 2024	Best Film	The Universal Theory	Nominated	
German Film Critics Association Awards	18 February 2024	Best Actor	Gottfried Breitfuss	Nominated	
German Film Critics Association Awards	18 February 2024	Best Screenplay	Timm Kröger, Roderick Warich	Nominated	
German Film Critics Association Awards	18 February 2024	Best Cinematography	Roland Stuprich	Nominated	
German Film Critics Association Awards	18 February 2024	Best Music	Diego Ramos Rodríguez	Won	
Utopiales	4 November 2023	Grand prix du jury des Utopiales	The Universal Theory	Won	
Venice Film Festival	9 September 2023	Golden Lion	Timm Kröger	Nominated	
