= Federico Luis =

Argentine filmmaker (born 1990)

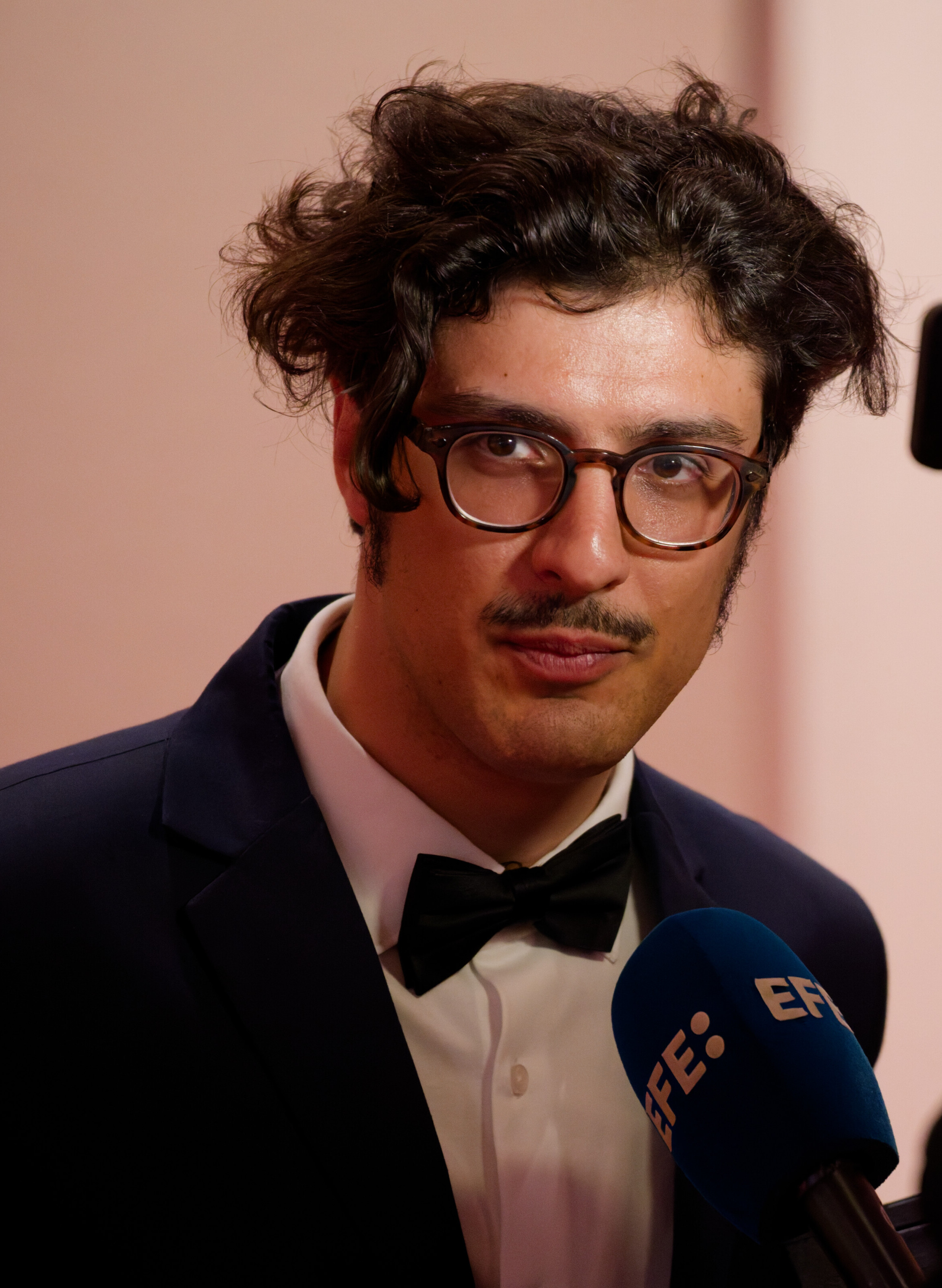
- Luis in 2026
- Born: Federico Luis Tachella; 1990 (age 35–36); Buenos Aires, Argentina
- Occupation: Film director

Federico Luis Tachella (born 1990), also known professionally as Federico Luis, is an Argentine filmmaker. His debut feature film Simon of the Mountain was awarded the Grand Prize of the Critics' Week at the 2024 Cannes Film Festival.

== Early life and education ==
Luis was born and raised in Buenos Aires and graduated from the University of Buenos Aires with a degree in Social Communication Sciences.

== Career ==
In 2013, Luis directed the short film Vidrios (Glass) alongside Ignacio Bollini. His short film La Siesta (The Nap) debuted in the Official Short Film Competition at the 2019 Cannes Film Festival. It later screened at the 2019 Toronto International Film Festival, where it was awarded an honorable mention in the Best International Short Film competition, and was awarded the Best Short Film at that year's Buenos Aires International Festival of Independent Cinema.

In 2023, Luis' documentary short At That Very Moment was recognized as the Best Short at that years International Documentary Film Festival Amsterdam. His debut feature film, Simon of the Mountain, premiered in the Critics' Week section of the 2024 Cannes Film Festival, where it was also eligible for the Camera d'Or. The film was awarded the Critics' Week Grand Prize. In 2026 his short film For the Opponents was awarded Short Film Palme d'Or at the 2026 Cannes Film Festival.

== Filmography ==
Year	Title	Notes	Ref.
2013	Vidrios/Glass	Short film co-directed with Ignacio Bollini	
2019	The Nap	Short film	
2023	At That Very Moment	Short film	
2024	Simon of the Mountain		
2026	For the Opponents	Short film	

== Awards and nominations ==
Year	Award	Category	Nominated work	Result	Ref.
2019	Cannes Film Festival	Official Short Film Competition	La Siesta	Nominated	
2019	Buenos Aires International Festival of Independent Cinema	Best Short Film	La Siesta	Won	
2019	Toronto International Film Festival	Best International Short Film	La Siesta	Honorable mention	
2023	International Documentary Film Festival Amsterdam	Best Short	At That Very Moment	Won	
2024	Cannes Film Festival	Camera d'Or	Simon of the Mountain	Nominated	
2024	Cannes Film Festival	Critics' Week Grand Prize	Simon of the Mountain	Won	
2026	Cannes Film Festival	Short Film Palme d'Or	For the Opponents	Won	
