= Timm Kröger =

German director, screenwriter and cinematographer (born 1985)

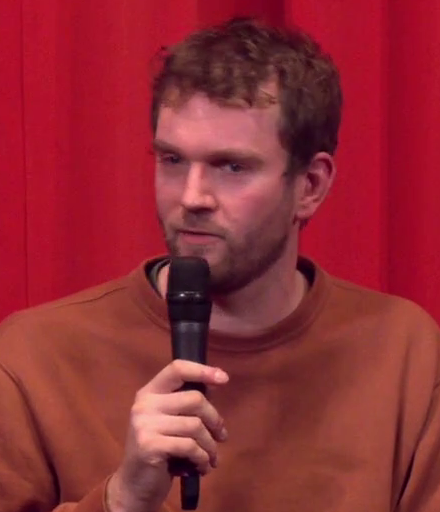
- Born: 17 November 1985 (age 39); Itzehoe, Schleswig-Holstein, West Germany
- Occupation(s): Filmmaker screenwriter

Timm Kröger (born 17 November 1985) is a German film director, screenwriter, cinematographer, producer and film editor.

== Life and career ==
Born in Itzehoe, Kröger studied at the European Film College in Ebeltoft, Denmark and at the Film Academy Baden-Württemberg in Ludwigsburg. After directing some shorts and documentaries, he made his feature film debut in 2014 with The Council of Birds, which premiered at the 71st Venice International Film Festival in the International Critics' Week sidebar. For this film he was awarded best director at the 2015 Belgrade International Film Festival. His second feature The Universal Theory entered the main competition at the 80th Venice International Film Festival.

Also active as a cinematographer and film editor for other directors, in 2022 Kröger was awarded the Preis der deutschen Filmkritik for best cinematography for The Trouble with Being Born.

== Selected filmography ==
Director and screenwriter

- The Council of Birds (2014)
- The Universal Theory (2023)

Cinematographer

- 16 × Deutschland (2013)
- The Trouble with Being Born (2020)
