= María Luisa Godoy =

Chilean journalist and television presenter

- Born: María Luisa Godoy Ibáñez; 18 March 1980 (age 46); Santiago, Chile
- Education: University of the Andes
- Occupations: Journalist, presenter
- Spouse: Ignacio Rivadeneira
- Parents: Domingo Godoy Matte (father); Carmen Ibáñez (mother)
- Relatives: Joaquín Godoy Ibáñez (brother)

María Luisa Godoy Ibáñez (born 18 March 1980) is a Chilean journalist and television presenter. She is currently the host of the TVN program Muy buenos días.

== Professional career ==
María Luisa Godoy's television debut was as a press journalist on Mega. After that, she hosted the morning news on La Red. Due to the closure of the channel's press department in 2008, she was reassigned as a panelist on Pollo en conserva.

In 2009 she moved to Chilevisión to lead the morning show Gente como tú with Leo Caprile and Julián Elfenbein. She remained in this role for three years, until the channel decided to replace the show's hosts. She also hosted the Festival del Huaso de Olmué twice.

At the end of 2012, she returned to Mega as backstage manager of Coliseo romano, and in 2014 she moved to TVN as team captain on the game show Juga2.

In early 2016, Godoy debuted on Buenos Días a Todos as part of a trio of hosts with Karen Doggenweiler and Javiera Contador. However, she soon left to take charge of the afternoon show Por ti with Cristián Sánchez, which was canceled due to low ratings.

In 2017, after the resignation of Javiera Contador, she returned to TVN's morning show, now called Muy buenos días.

== Personal life ==
María Luisa Godoy is the daughter of former deputies Carmen Ibáñez and Domingo Godoy, both politicians of National Renewal. She is the sister of former deputy Joaquín Godoy Ibáñez.

In 2010 she began a relationship with lawyer Ignacio Rivadeneira (son of Ricardo Rivadeneira), whom she married in 2012. They have three daughters. She previously had a romantic relationship with José Miguel Viñuela.

== Television programs ==
- Pollo en conserva (2008)
- Gente como tú (2009–2012)
- Olmué Huaso Festival (2011–2012)
- Dichato Festival (2012)
- Coliseo romano (2012–2013)
- Juga2 (2014)
- Más que 2 (2014)
- Buenos Días a Todos (2016)
- Fiesta de la Independencia Talca (2016–present)
- Por ti (2016)
- Muy buenos días (2017–present)
- Viña del Mar International Song Festival (2019–2024)
