= Alejandra Valle =

Chilean journalist (born 1975)

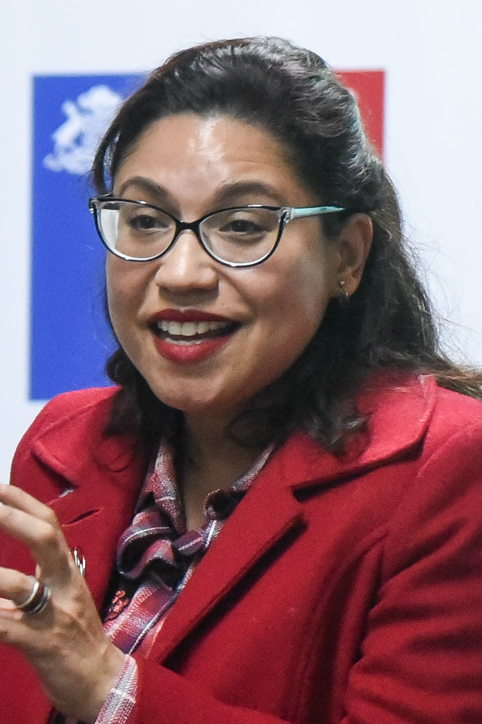

Councilor of Ñuñoa
- Incumbent
- Assumed office 28 June 2021

Personal details
- Born: 19 January 1975 (age 51) Valparaíso, Chile
- Party: Close to Broad Front
- Spouse: Paulo Latorre
- Children: Two
- Education: Playa Ancha University (BA)
- Occupation: Politician
- Profession: Journalist

Alejandra Andrea Valle Salinas (born 19 January 1975) is a Chilean journalist, showbiz commentator and politician.

From 2019 to 2020, she gained notoriety with her work as panelist in the online program La Voz de los que Sobran, which she worked with Daniel Stingo and Mauricio Jürgensen.

In mid-2021, she was elected as councilor of Ñuñoa.

== Biography ==
She began her television career as a panelist on the morning show Buenos Días a Todos until 2005. Then, she was hired by Chilevisión for being part of the panel of the show business SQP. In 2007, she was also the editor of SQP magazine, which was behind the paparazzi scandal carried out against Cecilia Bolocco in Miami.

In December 2007, Valle and José Miguel Villouta were fired from Chilevisión after having called «procurer» to Daniel Fernández Koprich, CEO of Televisión Nacional de Chile. The reason why they did it was related with the decision which that channel made to show half-naked to then teenager Dominique Gallego (17) in the reality show Pelotón.

Later, she returned to the TV and joined the program «En portada» of UCV Televisión, in which she worked alongside Cristián Pérez, Savka Pollak, Jaime Coloma and Pamela Jiles. Then, in 2011, she moved to La Red channel, where was a stable panelist of Intrusos, where she newly worked with Jiles.

On 2 August 2012, she caused a stir with her imitation of Amy Winehouse in the program Mi Nombre Es of Canal 13; Eight years later, his performance was still remembered.

On 23 July 2019, she was fired from La Red after making controversial comments against Carabineros de Chile in the context of the altercation which Catalina Pulido had with other police officers of the institution.

=== Political career ===
In January 2021, she announced her candidacy for councillor for Ñuñoa, commune of the capital city Santiago. Months later, in July, she won as the first municipal majority in the elections, which were held on 15–16 May.
