= Werne Núñez =

Chilean politician

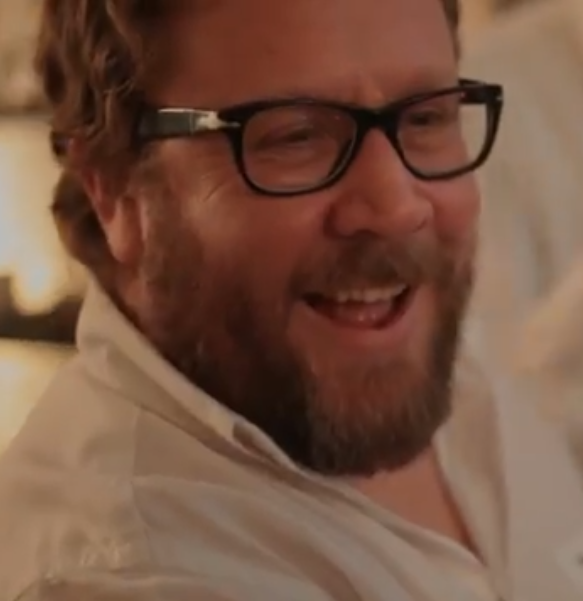
- In a Mistral ad in 2013

Personal details
- Born: 2 November 1973 (age 52) Quintero, Chile
- Education: Playa Ancha University (BA)
- Occupation: Writer broadcaster
- Profession: Journalist

Werne Jorge Javier Núñez Bustos (born 2 November 1973) is a Chilean journalist. He currently hosts Un país generoso ("A Generous Country") with the journalist Iván Guerrero in Rock & Pop Radio.

He was editor of the Contact Zone of El Mercurio newspaper as well as editor of Sábado and Domingo en Viaje, magazines from the same newspaper. He published his chronicles in Fibra, Blank, Paula, Playboy, and Gatopardo magazine from Colombia. Similarly, he worked on the newspaper Las Últimas Noticias (LUN) and was the author of the books Hip-Hop Poetry and Crónicas de un subnormal para gente inteligente (Chronicles of a moron for intelligent people).

He was general editor of the children's area of Canal 13 and creator of the series Pulentos, in which he worked with Anita Tijoux. By the other hand, Núñez worked on programs like La Última Tentación of Chilevisión, Exijo una explicación of TVN and Caiga Quien Caiga (CQC; Mega). He hosted the late-night talk show Bendito Lunes from Canal 13, where also was a panelist on Sigamos de largo alongside Mauricio Jürgensen, Francisca García-Huidobro and Maly Jorquiera.
