= Daniel Stingo =

Chilean politician (born 1965)

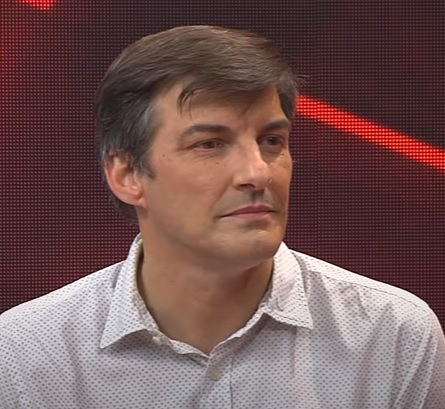
- Stingo in 2021

Member of the Constitutional Convention
- In office 4 July 2021 – 4 July 2022
- Constituency: 8th District

Personal details
- Born: 3 November 1965 (age 60) Vina del Mar, Chile
- Party: Christian Democratic Party (1990s); Democratic Revolution (2020−2023)
- Spouse: Patricia Díaz
- Children: Two
- Education: Pontifical Catholic University of Chile (LL.B)
- Occupation: Constituent
- Profession: Lawyer

Daniel Rodrigo Stingo Camus (born 3 November 1965) is a Chilean lawyer who was elected as a member of the Chilean Constitutional Convention.

In 2021, he was elected as a member of the Constitutional Convention representing the 8th District, achieving the highest vote nationwide with over 111,482 votes (which represented 24.65% of the district vote).

== Studies and professional career ==
Born in Valparaíso, descendant of Italian immigrants. He studied at San Juan Evangelista School, located in the commune of Las Condes.

He pursued higher education at the Faculty of Law of the Pontifical Catholic University of Chile (PUC), graduating as a lawyer on 3 April 1995.

He practiced law at the firms Aldunate y Cía., Del Río y Cía., Santander y Cía., and Stingo, Correa y Asociados. He also served as an advisor to the Directorate of Highways and the Directorate of Airports of the Ministry of Public Works (MOP).

== Media career ==
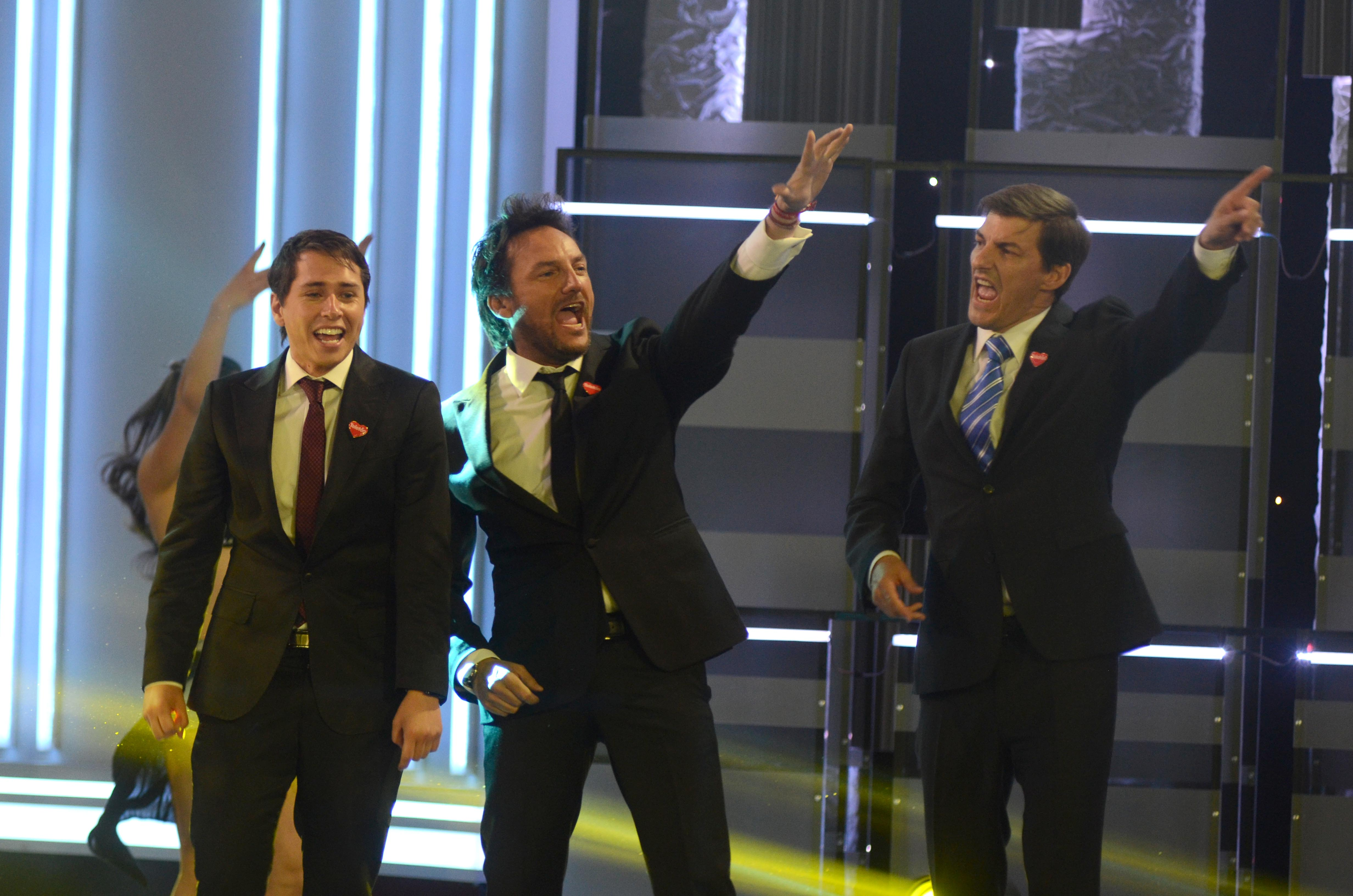
Stingo (right) alongside Karol Lucero and Daniel Fuenzalida at the 2014 Teletón.

His first television appearance was in 1996, during the launch of a new mayonnaise brand called Click.

In 2005, he made his television debut as a panelist on the morning show Buenos días a todos. Two years later, in 2007, he served as a judge on the TV program Tribunal oral, broadcast by Canal 13. In 2010, he returned as a panelist, this time on the morning show Viva la mañana on the same network. Between 2014 and 2018, he was a panelist on the morning show Mucho gusto on Mega.

After being dismissed from the channel, Stingo filed a labor lawsuit against Mega, which was upheld by the Court of Appeals of Santiago. However, the decision was overturned by the Supreme Court in January 2022.

In 2018, he joined Muy buenos días (later renamed Buenos días a todos) on TVN, where he gained notoriety for his commentary during the social unrest that began in October 2019. He was dismissed from TVN in November 2019 following a program restructuring.

That same month, together with Alejandra Valle and Mauricio Jürgensen, he launched the program El matinal de los que sobran, initially broadcast as a videocast by the newspaper El Desconcierto and later renamed La voz de los que sobran, which has been broadcast simultaneously by Radio Usach and Santiago TV since 2020.

== Political career ==
During his university years, he was a member of the Christian Democratic Party and served as a council member of the Federation of Students of the Catholic University of Chile (FEUC). He was a classmate of Patricio Zapata Larraín (DC) and Rodrigo Álvarez Zenteno (UDI).

He ran as a member of Democratic Revolution (RD) for the 2021 Constitutional Convention elections, representing the 8th District (comprising the communes of Estación Central, Lampa, Cerrillos, Colina, Pudahuel, Maipú, Tiltil, and Quilicura). In the election, he obtained the highest national majority, receiving 111,482 votes, equivalent to 24.65% of the district.
