= Germán Sotelo =

Chilean footballer

Personal information
- Full name: Germán Leandro Sotelo Cárdenas
- Date of birth: 25 April 1986 (age 40)
- Place of birth: Valparaíso, Chile
- Height: 1.92 m (6 ft 4 in)
- Position: Goalkeeper

Youth career
- 1993–2003: Lautaro
- 2003–2004: Santiago Wanderers

Senior career*
Years	Team	Apps	(Gls)
2005	Santiago Wanderers		
2006	Municipal Limache		
2007–2008	Universidad Católica		
2009–2011	Lota Schwager	26	(0)
2012	Iberia	8	(0)
2013–2014	Deportes Concepción		
2015	CD Iberia		
2016	Parroquial Zapallar		

Managerial career
- Santiago Wanderers (youth)
- 2022–2023: Playa Ancha University
- * Club domestic league appearances and goals

Germán Leandro Sotelo Cárdenas (born 25 April 1986) is a Chilean former footballer who played as a goalkeeper.

== Career ==
Born in Valparaíso, Chile, Sotelo was with Club Deportivo Lautaro before joining the Santiago Wanderers youth system in his hometown. He was a member of the first team in the 2005 season.

In his homeland, he also played for Municipal Limache, Universidad Católica, Lota Schwager, Iberia, Deportes Concepción and Parroquial de Zapallar. As a member of Iberia, he won the 2012 Segunda División Profesional.

Abroad, he played for Club Deportivo Iberia from New York, United States, in the Cosmopolitan Soccer League in 2015.

At international level, Sotelo was part of a Chile under-25 squad in a training session led by Claudio Borghi in May 2011, alongside his teammate in Lota Schwager, José Huentelaf.

== Coaching career ==
A PE teacher from the Playa Ancha University, Sotelo served as coach of the football team in 2022–23, winning the championship of FENAUDE (national university federation). He has worked for the Santiago Wanderers youth system as coach of the under-13s as well as goalkeeping coach of the under-17s.

== Honours ==
=== Player ===
Iberia

- Segunda División Profesional: 2012

=== Coach ===
Playa Ancha University

- National Championship FENAUDE: 2022
