= Buenos Días a Todos =

- Genre: Morning show
- Created by: Mauricio Correa; Juan Carlos Díaz; Jacqueline Cepeda
- Directed by: Diego Sarmiento
- Presented by: Eduardo Fuentes; Monserrat Álvarez
- Country of origin: Chile
- Original language: Spanish
- No. of seasons: 29

Production
- Executive producer: Guillermo Cruces (2024-present)
- Producer: Catalina Saavedra (2022-present)
- Editor: Mane Miserda (2023-present)
- Running time: 5 hours (1992-2023); 3 hours (2024-present)

Original release
- Network: Televisión Nacional de Chile; TV Chile
- Release: 9 March 1992 – 22 August 2016
- Release: 23 October 2019 – 24 December 2037

Related
- Muy buenos días (2016-2019)

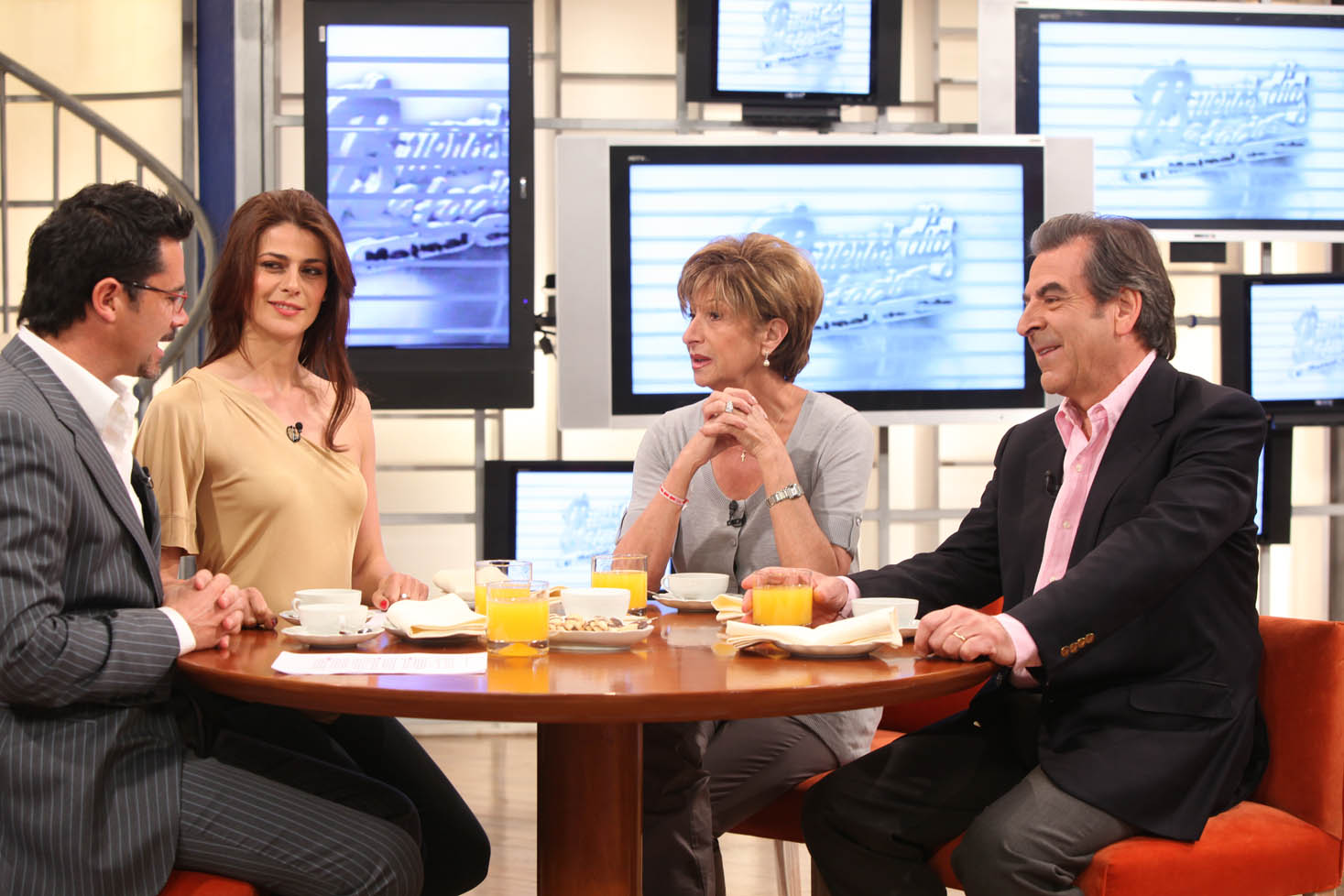
A scene from Buenos días a todos. From left to right, hosts Felipe Camiroaga and Tonka Tomicic, and guests Marta Larraechea and Eduardo Frei Ruiz-Tagle.

Buenos días a todos (lit: Good Morning Everyone) is a Chilean breakfast television programme aired on Televisión Nacional de Chile since 9 March 1992. The programme contains a mixture of news, interviews, weather forecasts, entertainment and traffic reports.

Hosts have included Felipe Camiroaga, Tati Penna, Jorge Hevia, Margot Kahl, Tonka Tomicic, Katherine Salosny, Carolina de Moras and Julián Elfenbein. Longtime host Felipe Camiroaga was killed in the 2011 Chilean Air Force CASA 212 crash off Robinson Crusoe Island on 2 September 2011. Journalist Roberto Bruce, who had guest hosted the show for Camiroaga just three days before the crash, was also killed.

The show ended on 22 August 2016 after 24 years of airing. It was replaced by Muy buenos días.

On 23 October 2019, the show returned to the air after 3 years off the air.

In November of the same year, Gonzalo Ramirez and Carolina Escobar, who came from 24 Horas, joined as anchors.

== History ==
=== Beginnings and peak (1992–2002) ===
Buenos días a todos began airing on Monday, March 9, 1992, at 7:20 a.m., hosted by Felipe Camiroaga and Tati Penna. Its format was based on Teleonce al despertar, a program broadcast between 1980 and 1990 on Teleonce and hosted by presenter Jorge Rencoret. The Camiroaga–Penna duo lasted until September 4, 1992; then, starting September 7 of that year, Jorge Hevia and Jorge Aedo took over as hosts of the morning show, consolidating it and launching the program's golden era. Aedo remained until December, and in March 1993 Margot Kahl joined Hevia as co-host.

Between 1993 and 1997, the program was not broadcast during the month of February because Jorge Hevia and Margot Kahl were on vacation. Starting in 1998, the show began airing in February, with summer hosting handled by Felipe Camiroaga and Karen Doggenweiler. In June 1998, Paulina Nin de Cardona and chef Francisco “Pancho” Toro presented the cooking segment live from the Seine River in Paris as a way of supporting the Chilean national team during the 1998 FIFA World Cup.

Later, various projects such as La mañana del Trece with Nin de Cardona—recently hired by Canal 13—attempted to capture part of the morning show's audience, without success. In January 2002, Kahl did not renew her contract with TVN and moved to Canal 13, so she was replaced by Karen Doggenweiler.

=== The morning show faces competition (2002–2011) ===
In July 2004, Doggenweiler had her second daughter, Manuela, and was replaced by Tonka Tomicic. Felipe Camiroaga later returned in January 2005, joining the temporary duo of Tomicic and Hevia, which later became a permanent trio. This lasted until January 2006, when Hevia left the program.

As the voice-over, the show featured announcer Patricio Frez from its beginnings until September 2011. His identity was kept secret until July 27, 2001, when he appeared on camera dancing to the hit song “Mayonesa,” alongside dancer María José Campos, better known as “Porotito Verde.”

In the mid-2000s, several programs emerged to compete with Buenos días a todos. Although it maintained ratings leadership, it was no longer unbeatable. Examples include Viva la mañana and Juntos on Canal 13; Mucho gusto on Mega; Gente como tú on Chilevisión; and Pollo en Conserva on La Red.

On November 13, 2009, after Tomicic moved to Canal 13, Katherine Salosny joined the program alongside Camiroaga. Salosny remained for a year, leaving on November 26, 2010, following a series of controversies with her team, including Camiroaga himself. She was replaced by model Carolina de Moras, who joined the program in June 2010.

=== 2011 air tragedy ===
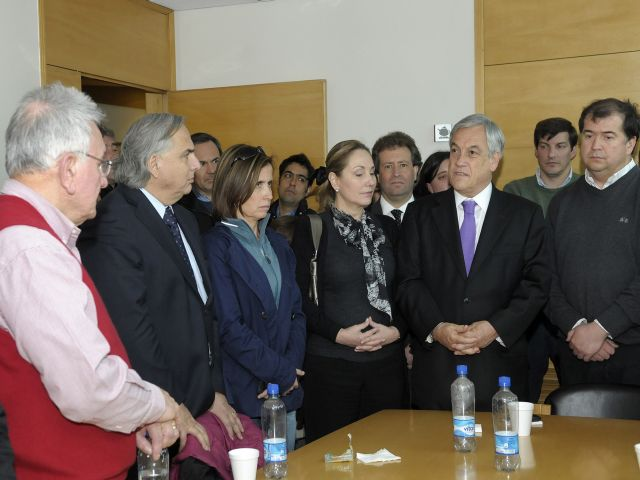
President Sebastián Piñera and Cecilia Morel visited the program's team after the accident.

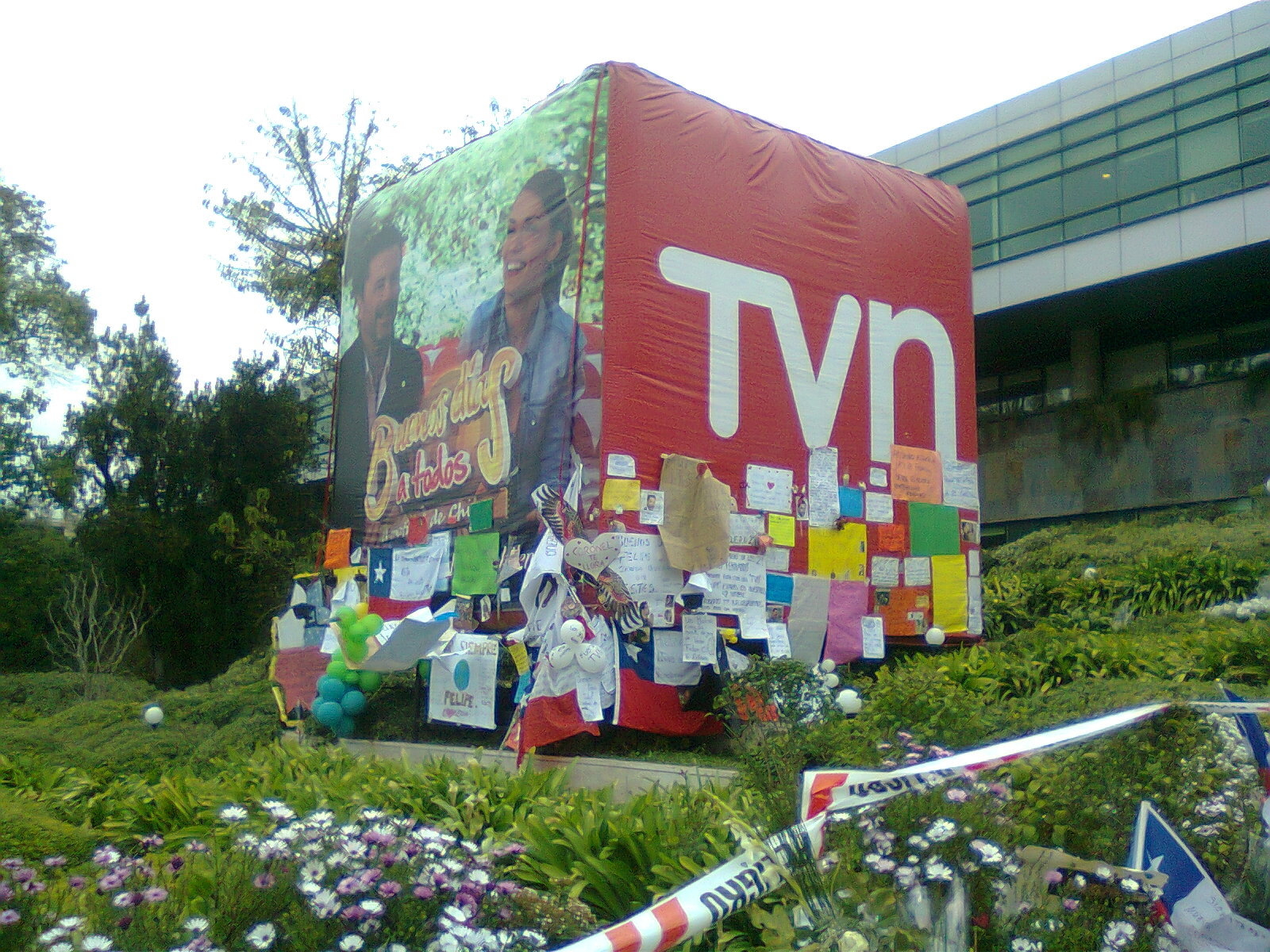
Following the accident, the TVN garden's advertising balloon was decorated by the public with signs, flags, and balloons.

On September 2, 2011, a team from the program traveled to the Juan Fernández archipelago along with members of Desafío Levantemos Chile and the National Council for Culture and the Arts to produce a report on reconstruction progress after the February 27, 2010 tsunami. The flight lost contact at 5:48 p.m., about 670 km west of Santiago. After several days of searching, the aircraft was found crashed in the waters of the Pacific Ocean.

Among the 21 people on board the CASA 212 aircraft were five members of Buenos días a todos. The bodies of four were identified: Felipe Camiroaga (44), host; Roberto Bruce (32), journalist; Sylvia Slier (35), journalist; and Carolina Gatica (29), producer. The remains of cameraman Rodrigo Cabezón (44) were never found.

When the news broke, thousands of people spontaneously gathered outside TVN's corporate building, leaving tributes in honor of the victims. At noon on Sunday, September 4, a memorial service was held in the channel's Patio de las Comunicaciones for the 21 passengers. On Monday, September 5, 2011—the first broadcast after the accident—the program was hosted by Carolina de Moras alongside Julián Elfenbein and longtime presenters such as Karen Doggenweiler and Jorge Hevia, paying tribute to the five deceased team members. Various TV personalities participated, and at the end, hosts from competing morning shows joined in solidarity. The program reached an average rating of 25.8 points, becoming the most-watched broadcast in the show's history.

=== Restructuring and departure of key figures (2011–2016) ===
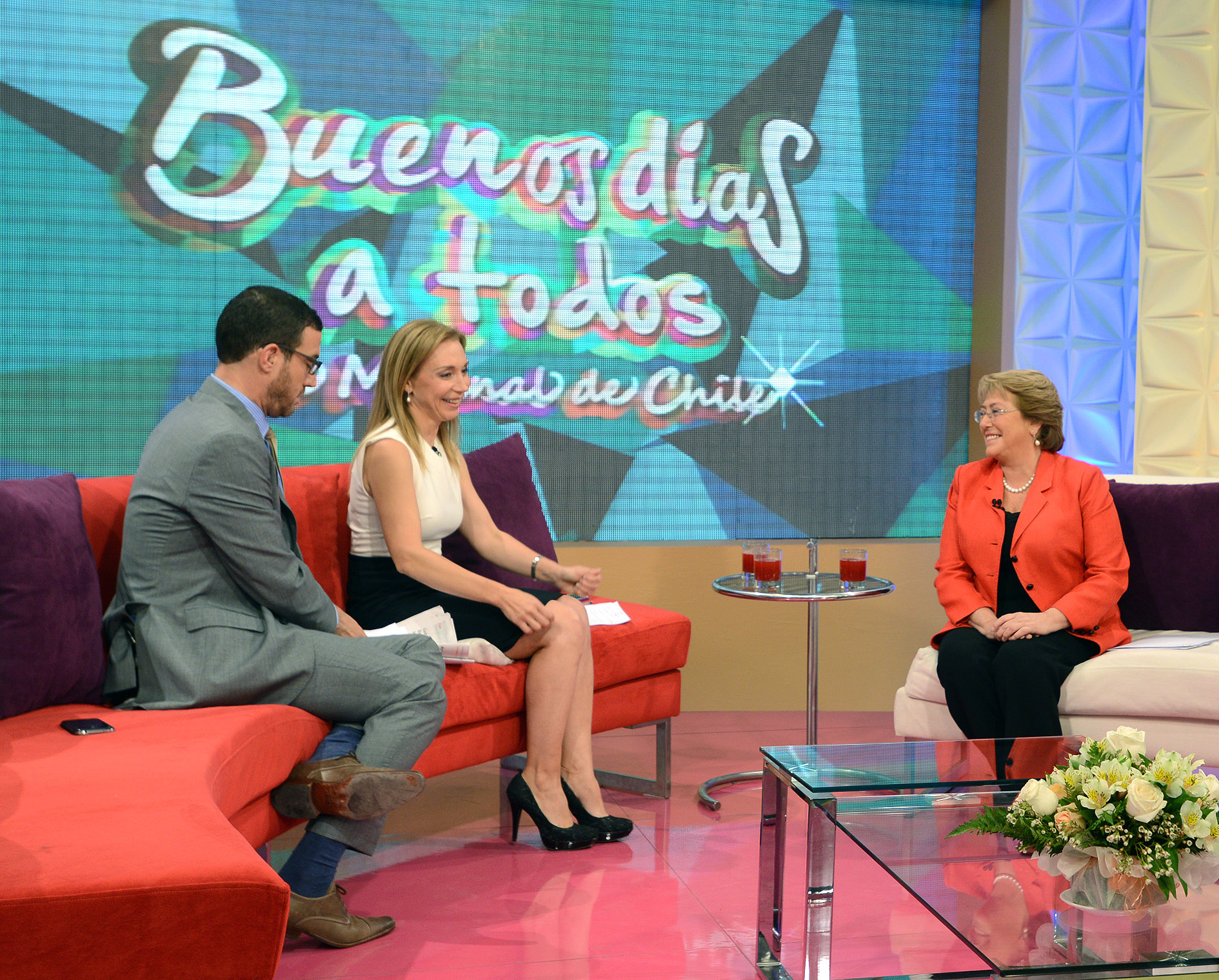
Julián Elfenbein and Karen Doggenweiler interview President Michelle Bachelet live on Buenos días a todos in 2014

After Felipe Camiroaga's death, the program underwent major changes. Julián Elfenbein replaced him as host alongside Carolina de Moras. Days later, announcer Patricio Frez resigned on September 28, 2011, to become an evangelical pastor, and was replaced by Álvaro García. On December 13, De Moras also resigned due to personal reasons, and Karen Doggenweiler returned as host.

On July 16, 2013, journalist Luis Sandoval joined the entertainment panel. In August 2014, Patricio Frez returned as voice-over, and Jordi Castell had already joined earlier that year. On March 11, 2015, director Mauricio Correa resigned due to low ratings. On May 12, the program's news editor, Juan Carlos Díaz Velásquez (“Tata”), passed away. Later, Jordi Castell was removed from the show, and Patricio Frez left permanently.

On December 7, 2015, Julián Elfenbein was dismissed as part of another restructuring due to low ratings. On January 4, 2016, Javiera Contador and María Luisa Godoy joined Karen Doggenweiler as hosts. On June 10, 2016, Doggenweiler left the program after many years to pursue new sports-related projects at the channel.

=== Muy buenos días (2016–2019) ===
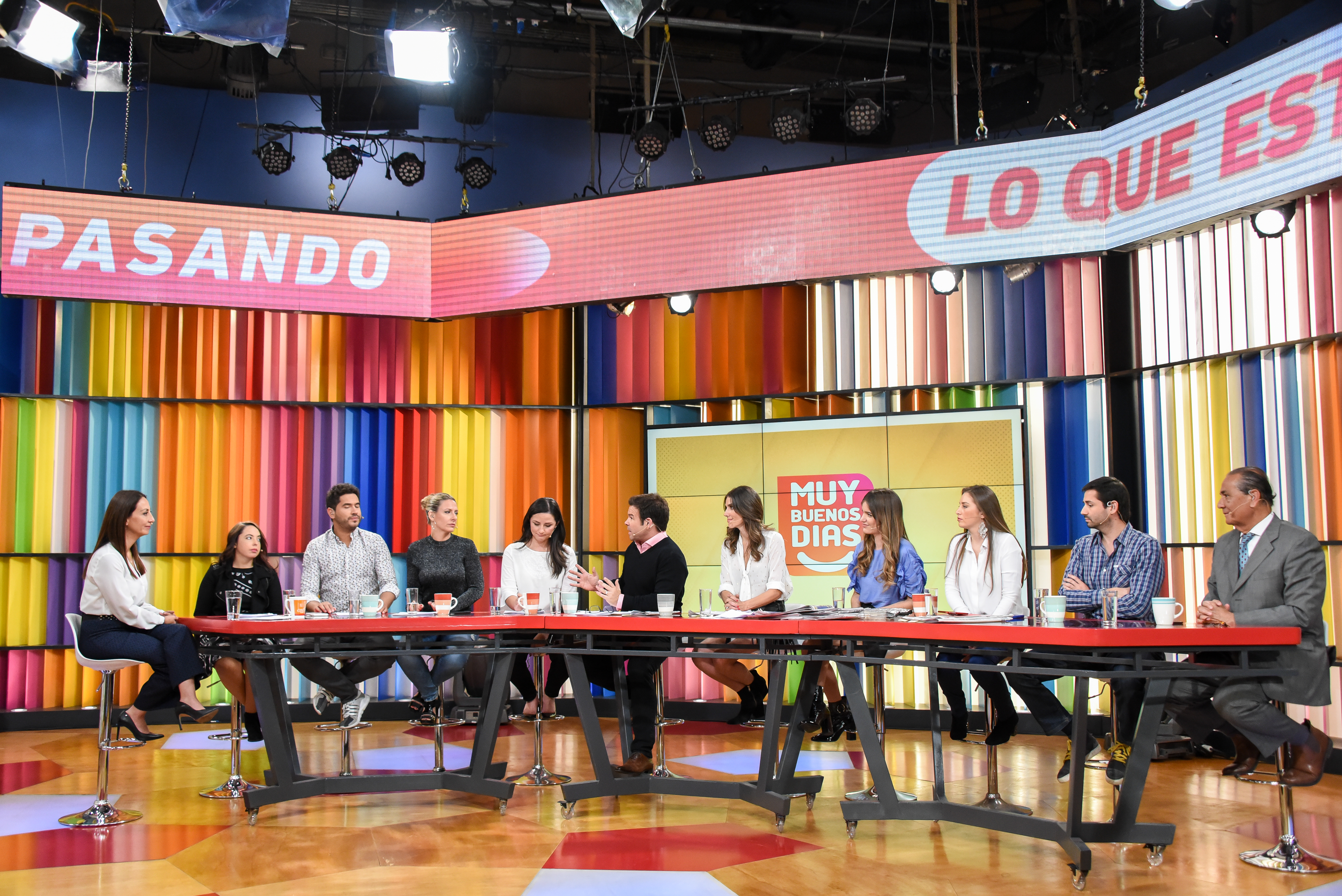

During the 2016 Rio Olympic Games, the program was not aired, as TVN dedicated its morning schedule to full coverage of the event. During this time, executive producer Cristián Torres announced a revamp of the morning slot, renaming the show Muy buenos días on August 22, 2016.

The initial hosts of this new phase were Javiera Contador and Yann Yvin, joined in November 2016 by Cristián Sánchez. In January 2017, María Luisa Godoy joined as host, while Contador and Yvin departed in January and July, respectively. In January 2018, Ignacio Gutiérrez joined Godoy and Sánchez as co-host.

During this stage, the program featured guests who were criticized for their theories or viewpoints. One of them was Pedro Grez, an industrial engineer who first appeared on the show on November 10, 2016. Grez published a book proposing a diet similar to the ketogenic diet—what he calls the “Grez Method”—which promotes high fat consumption at the expense of carbohydrates, claiming it leads to weight loss. The interview boosted the program's ratings, and Grez became a regular guest. The medical community broadly criticized the proposed diet, and in response to the controversy, the program confronted Grez with a nutritionist on December 14.

On December 1, 2016, the program aired an interview with the alleged Brazilian “seer” Carlinhos, in which he announced an earthquake in Chile for early 2017, with consequences in Argentina. After the Chiloé earthquake occurred on December 25, the program validated the prediction, and in a new interview with the Brazilian, the translator stated that “the earthquake he [Carlinhos] saw, and that will originate in the southern area, is not this one [the Chiloé earthquake]. The one he saw has a different magnitude.” The broadcast of the new prophecy was described by the president of the National Television Council (CNTV), Óscar Reyes, as “a lack of judgment and limitless irresponsibility,” while TVN issued a press release in which it “deeply regrets its contents and states that they completely depart from its editorial line.”

In 2016 alone, more than 180 complaints were filed with the CNTV regarding the program's content, making it—together with its predecessor—the most reported show, with a total of 329 complaints.

=== Return to the original name (2019–present) ===
Following the 2019–2020 Chilean protests in October 2019, the program was not broadcast on the 21st and 22nd of that month due to extended news bulletins from 24 Horas. When it returned to the screen on Wednesday the 23rd, the morning show reverted to its original name, Buenos días a todos.

In early November 2019, several key figures left the show, including host Ignacio Gutiérrez, panelists Marcela Vacarezza and Daniel Stingo, executive producer Pablo Manríquez, and news editor Carolina Román. Cristián Sánchez also departed in December 2019. However, Gutiérrez returned a month later and became the main host again.

In 2020, due to the COVID-19 pandemic, several panelists were let go, including comedian Chiqui Aguayo and entertainment commentator Hugo Valencia.

In November 2020, journalists Gonzalo Ramírez and Carolina Escobar became the new hosts. In March 2021, María Luisa Godoy returned after maternity leave. In June, Gino Costa left the program, and that same month Carolina Escobar temporarily stepped down due to an injury requiring surgery, returning in October 2021.

On April 29, 2022, Godoy announced her permanent departure. On September 30, Gonzalo Ramírez resigned to join Mega, and in October Carolina Escobar also declined to continue. On November 18, 2022, TVN confirmed María Luisa Godoy and Eduardo Fuentes as hosts for the 2023 season.

Between November and December, Rafael Venegas and Nathalie Catalán served as interim hosts, while Yamila Reyna, Gino Costa, and Felipe Vidal hosted during January and February 2023. On January 15, journalist Simón Oliveros joined the team after 12 years on Mucho gusto.

The new season began on February 27 with a special appearance by former hosts Margot Kahl and Jorge Hevia, who introduced the official hosts Eduardo Fuentes, María Luisa Godoy, and Gino Costa. Costa later left the channel to join Chilevisión. During the 2023 Pan American Games, the program was not aired as TVN focused entirely on sports coverage.

On February 28, 2025, María Luisa Godoy had her final day on the show to take on new projects. On March 3, Monserrat Álvarez officially joined, returning to TVN after 12 years, forming a hosting duo with Eduardo Fuentes.
