= Off-Lined =

Desconectados
- Amazon Prime Video release poster
- Directed by: Diego Rougier
- Written by: Diego Rougier; Diego Ayala; Rodrigo Vergara Tampe
- Produced by: Javiera Contador; Diego Rougier
- Starring: Javiera Contador
- Cinematography: David Bravo
- Edited by: Camilo Campi
- Music by: Pablo Ilabaca; Camilo Salinas
- Production company: Picardia Films
- Distributed by: Amazon Prime Video
- Release date: December 16, 2022 (Prime Video)
- Running time: 106 minutes
- Countries: Chile; United States
- Language: Spanish

Off-Lined (Spanish: Desconectados) is a 2022 Chilean-American comedy film directed by Diego Rougier and written by Rougier, Diego Ayala & Rodrigo Vergara Tampe, based on an original idea by Rodrigo Vergara Tampe. Starring Javiera Contador. It is the first Chilean film produced for Amazon Prime.

== Synopsis ==
Victoria, a mother addicted to the internet and work, is completely disconnected from her two teenage children, Clara and Julián. Just when he is about to receive that long-awaited promotion, a solar storm leaves the entire world without internet, indefinitely. With her ex-husband stranded in another country, she is faced with the reality that she has to be a mother without the help of apps or the internet.

== Cast ==
The actors participating in this film are:

- Javiera Contador as Victoria
- María Jesus Haran as Clara
- Diego Rojas as Julián
- Dayana Amigo as Angela
- Jaime Vadell as Rigoberto
- Jorge Zabaleta as Vicente
- Carmen Gloria Bresky as Raquel
- Alejandro Trejo as Hardware Store Customer 1
- Luis Dubó as Hardware Store Customer 2
- Luz Jiménez as Hardware Store Senior Customer
- Gabriela Hernández as Silvia
- Alonso Torres as Store Manager
- Catalina Castelblanco as Rosario

== Production ==
The film was filmed in the cities of Santiago de Chile and Arica.

== Release ==
The film was released in Latin American territory on December 16, 2022, on Amazon Prime Video, and it premiered internationally on January 10, 2023.

== Awards ==
Year	Award	Category	Recipient	Result	Ref.
2023	10th Platino Awards	Best Comedy Film	Off-Lined	Nominated	

== Future ==
The film will have a Thai remake that will start filming in 2023.
