= Roberto Bruce =

Chilean journalist

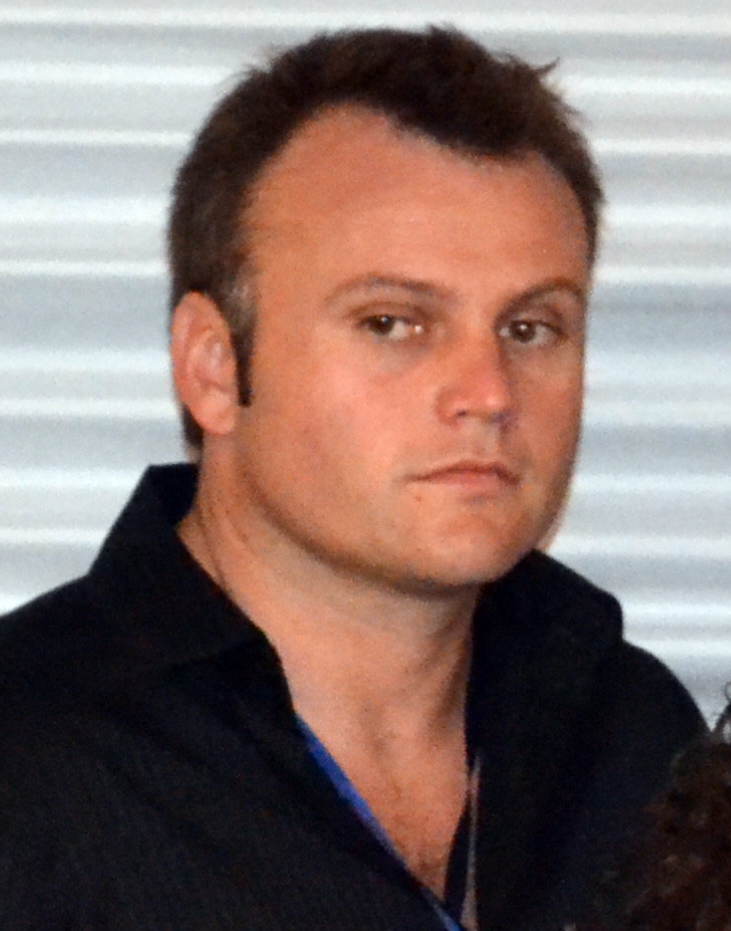
- Born: Roberto Andrés Bruce Pruzzo; 30 July 1979; Talagante, Chile
- Died: 2 September 2011 (aged 32); Juan Fernández Archipelago, Chile
- Resting place: Parque del Recuerdo
- Other names: El Gordo; El Torito de fresia
- Education: Attended Diego Portales University
- Occupation: Journalist of Buenos Días a Todos
- Years active: 2002–2011
- Spouse: Andrea Sanhueza
- Children: Martina Bruce Sanhueza and Rafaela Bruce Sanhueza
- Website: www.robertobruce.cl

Roberto Andrés Bruce Pruzzo (Spanish pronunciation: [roˈβeɾto anˈdɾes ˈβɾuse ˈpɾuso]; 30 July 1979 – 2 September 2011) was a Chilean television journalist, mainly known for his work on Televisión Nacional de Chile's breakfast programme Buenos Días a Todos. Bruce also worked as host of Dónde La Viste in the same TV channel.

== Biography ==
The older of three brothers, Bruce was born in Talagante, a town southwest of Santiago de Chile. He spent his childhood in a rural area of the Maipo Valley, near Melipilla.

Roberto Bruce attended primary and secondary studies at Colegio Carampangue, in Talagante. In 1998 he began his journalism studies in the Diego Portales University, which he completed in 2002. Bruce was married to Andrea Sanhueza, with whom he had two daughters: Martina Bruce Sanhueza, and Rafaela Bruce Sanhueza.

His first job in television was on Buenos Días a Todos (Good Morning Everyone), breakfast programme of Televisión Nacional de Chile; he joined the TV channel as student in practice. There, he served as journalist working in the field, doing reports on current, and entertainment events.

In 2011, he was the host of his first television programme, Dónde La Viste (Where Did You See). The programme, co-hosted by actors Natalia Valdebenito, Sebastián Layseca, and Natalie Nicloux, was of "humouristic and entertaining" style. In June of the same year, he was the host of the backstage section of La Dieta del Lagarto (The Alligator Diet), where he weighed the participants of that program who attempted to become thin by dancing.

On August 31, 2011, two days before his death, he replaced Felipe Camiroaga as the host of Buenos Días a Todos, as the latter was sick that day.

On 2 September 2011, the plane in which Bruce was travelling to the Juan Fernández Archipelago with twenty other persons, including a team from Buenos Días a Todos with such figures as Felipe Camiroaga crashed. His body was found at the sea on 3 September, and he was cremated the following day at the Parque del Recuerdo cemetery in Huechuraba. The commune of Melipilla decreed two days of communal mourning in his honour.

== Work ==
In TV programmes

Year	Programme	Role	TV channel
2002–2011	Buenos Días a Todos	Reporter / Journalist	TVN
2010	Teletón 2010	Backstage journalist	TVN
2011	Dónde La Viste	Host	TVN
2011	La Dieta del Lagarto	Backstage journalist	TVN
