= José Huentelaf =

Chilean footballer (born 1989)

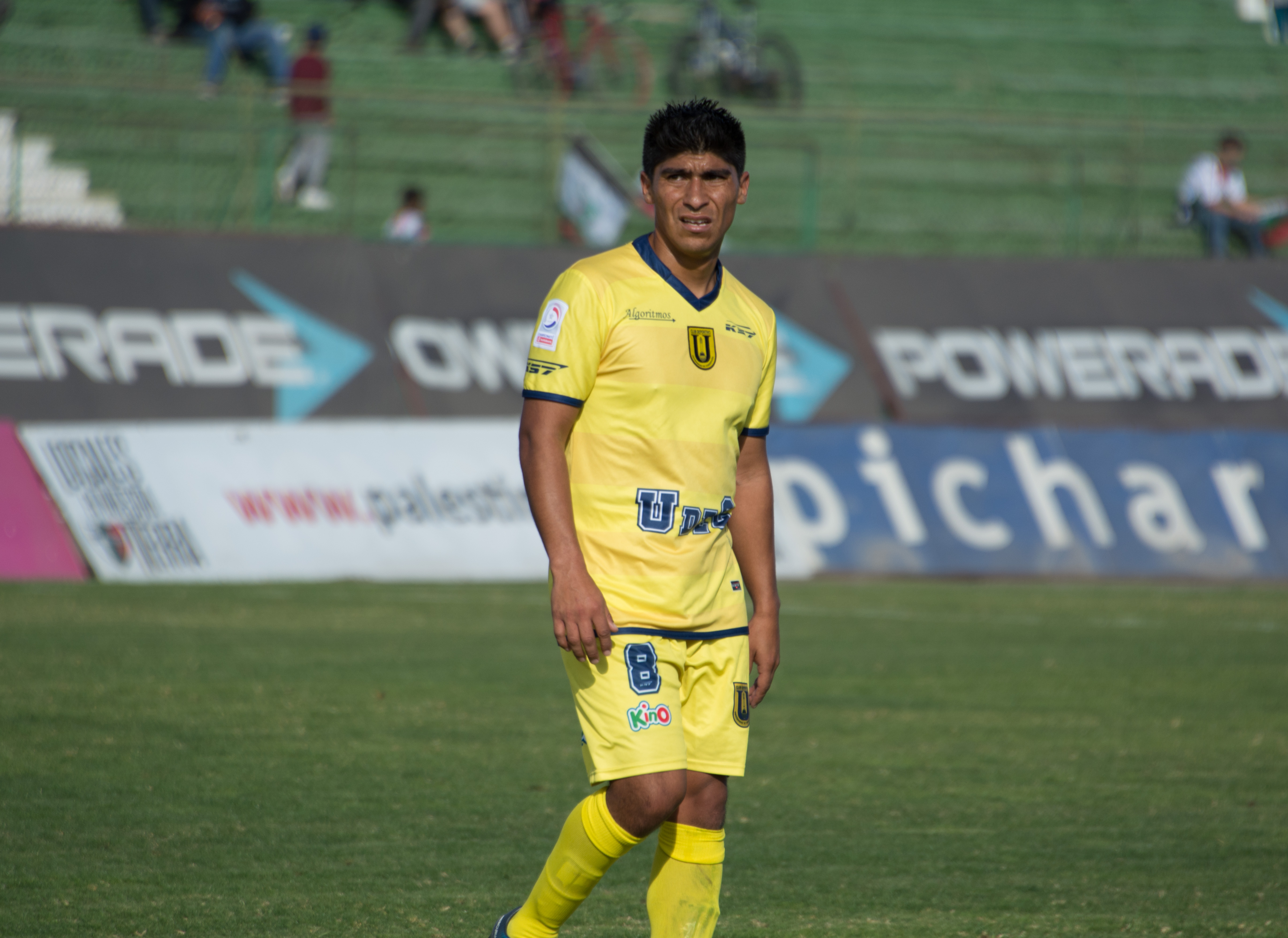

Personal information
- Full name: José Antonio Huentelaf Santana
- Date of birth: 22 January 1989 (age 37)
- Place of birth: Viña del Mar, Chile
- Height: 1.71 m (5 ft 7 in)
- Position: Left winger

Youth career
- 2006–2008: Everton

Senior career*
Years	Team	Apps	(Gls)
2009–2014	Lota Schwager	178	(30)
2014–2019	Universidad de Concepción	70	(12)
2016–2017	→ Deportes Temuco (loan)	26	(0)
2020–2021	Deportes Melipilla	22	(0)
Total		296	(42)
- * Club domestic league appearances and goals

José Antonio Huentelaf Santana (born 22 January 1989) is a Chilean former footballer who played as a left winger. His last club was Deportes Melipilla in the Primera B de Chile.

== Career ==
Huentelaf was part of a Chile under-25 squad in a training session led by Claudio Borghi in May 2011, alongside his teammate in Lota Schwager, Germán Sotelo.

== Personal life ==
Huentelaf is of Mapuche descent and his surname means "sea surface" or "lake" in Mapudungun.

== Honours ==
Universidad de Concepción

- Copa Chile: 2014–15
