= 2011 Chilean Air Force C-212 crash =

2011 aircraft crash in Chile

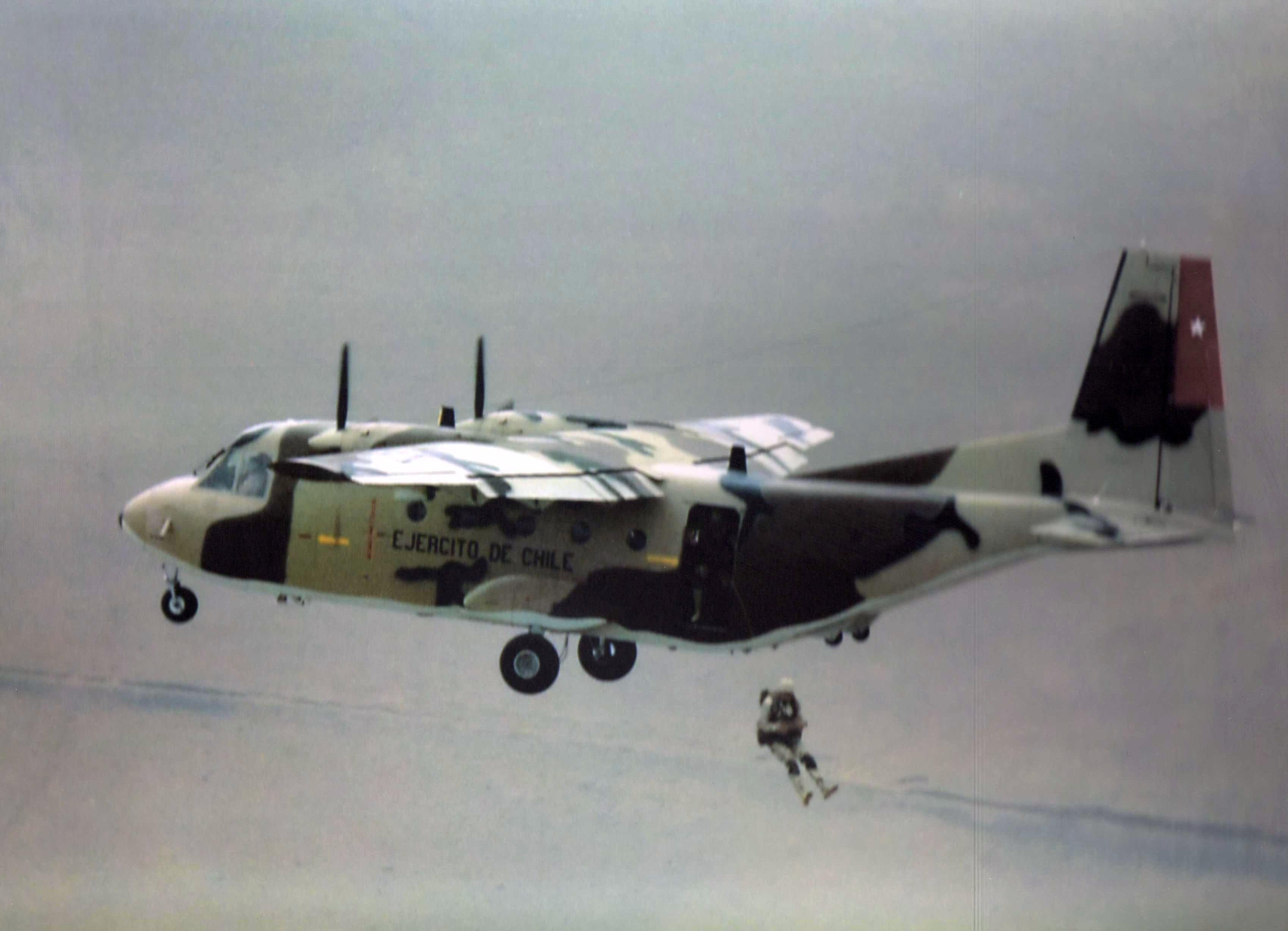
- A CASA C-212 of the Chilean Air Force

Accident
- Date: September 2, 2011
- Summary: Loss of control in adverse weather
- Site: 1 km south-east of Robinson Crusoe Airport, Chile; 33°40′57″S 78°55′03″W

Aircraft
- Aircraft type: Casa C-212 Aviocar 300DF
- Operator: Chilean Air Force
- Registration: 966
- Flight origin: Santiago International Airport, Santiago, Chile
- Destination: Robinson Crusoe Airport, Robinson Crusoe Island, Chile
- Occupants: 21
- Passengers: 17
- Crew: 4
- Fatalities: 21
- Survivors: 0

On 2 September 2011, a CASA C-212 Aviocar military transport of the Chilean Air Force (Spanish: Fuerza Aérea de Chile, FACH) on a flight from Santiago to Robinson Crusoe Island, Chile, crashed into the sea while manoeuvring to land. All 21 passengers and crew on board were killed.

The aircraft was transporting a crew from Chile's national TV, and among the victims were presenter Felipe Camiroaga and journalist Roberto Bruce.

== Accident ==
The aircraft was on a relief flight in support of operations in the wake of the 2010 Chile earthquake. It was operated by the 10th Transport Group of the Chilean Air Force. It departed from the Arturo Merino Benítez International Airport, Santiago at 13:52 local time (16:52 UTC), bound for Robinson Crusoe Airport, with four crew members and seventeen passengers on board.

The flight lasted almost three hours, hampered by adverse weather and strong winds. On arriving over the airfield, the plane overflew the entire runway and positioned itself for a landing in the opposite direction. However, due to strong crosswinds, the approach was discontinued and the twin-engine went around for a second attempt.

At 16:48, personnel at the airfield observed the aircraft performing a wide turn at low altitude; it then disappeared from view behind a hill without re-emerging. The C-212 had crashed into the sea between Robinson Crusoe and Santa Clara islands, killing all on board.

Local fishermen and inhabitants later found the bodies of a man and two women floating in the sea. On 7 September, four more bodies were recovered. The accident was the deadliest suffered by the FACH since 1977, and the second deadliest accident in FACH history.

== Aircraft ==
The aircraft involved was a twin-turboprop Casa C-212 Aviocar 300DF with tail number 966. It was manufactured in 1994 with serial number 443.

== Victims ==
One of the victims was Felipe Camiroaga, a presenter with Televisión Nacional de Chile (National Broadcasting of Chile), who was traveling to the island for the Buenos Días a Todos (Good Morning Everyone) show, to report on the reconstruction after the 2010 earthquake. He was accompanied by journalist Roberto Bruce and three other members of the TV channel, including photographer Romina Irarrázabal.

External image
- Final photo taken on Irarrázabal's camera (raised contrast)

Irarrázabal or another is believed to have initially survived and document some of the plane crash. An SD card identified to have come from Irarrázabal's Nikon camera contained 409 photographs; of the six taken on the plane, the final two respectively document the cabin floor during or shortly after the descent, and the water level of the ocean against a window as the aircraft began to sink. Before drowning, the photographer removed the SD card and secured it in a water bottle where it was recovered by divers on 6 November 2011.

== Investigation ==
Investigators concluded that, while flying the downwind leg around the airfield at 650 ft (200 m) above the sea, a sudden loss of control caused the aircraft to roll almost inverted, lose altitude and strike the surface of the water.

The loss of control was attributed to the adverse weather conditions prevailing at the time, characterized by strong, gusty winds arising from a weather front passing through the area. Turbulence in the wake of surrounding terrain and wind shear were also cited as factors in the loss of control.
