= Javiera Contador =

Chilean actress, comedian and television hostess

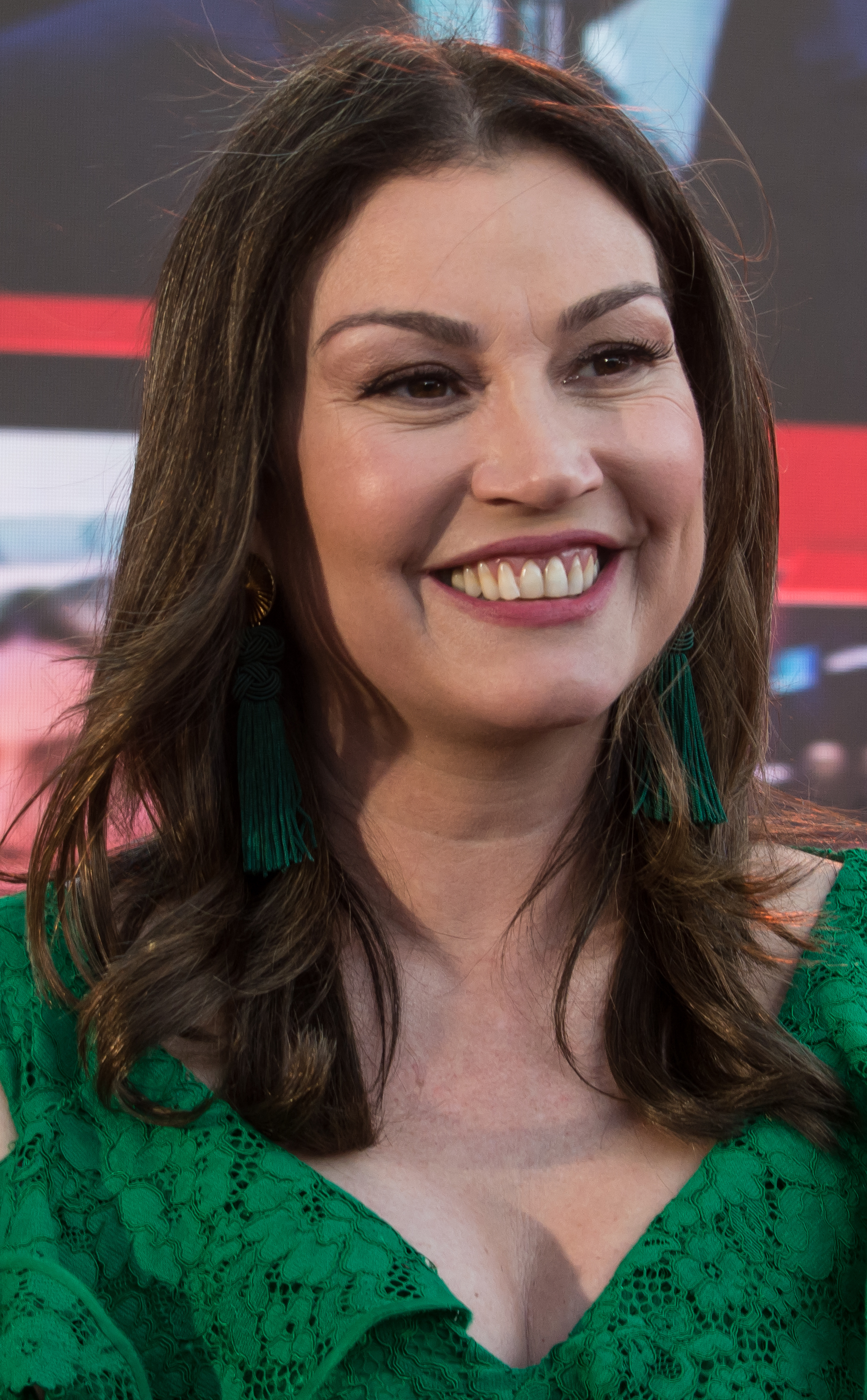
- Born: Javiera Contador; June 17, 1974 (age 52); Santiago, Chile
- Education: Pontifical Catholic University of Chile
- Occupations: Actress, Comedian, TV hostess
- Children: 2

Javiera Contador (born June 17, 1974 in Santiago) is a Chilean actress, comedian and television hostess. She played Quena Gómez de Larraín on the television show Casado con Hijos.

She studied theatre at Pontificia Universidad Católica de Chile. Her first major role was in the telenovela "Loca Piel". She was the hostess of "Si se la Puede Gana", and along with Ricardo Astorga of "La Ruta del Nilo" (2005) and "La Ruta de Oceanía" (2006). Currently, Contador co-hosts Mucho Gusto with José Miguel Viñuela.

Contador was an active member of the Communist Youth of Chile and the High School Students Federation (FESES) during the 1990s.

== Filmography ==
=== Films ===
- Sangre eterna (2002)
- Smog (2000)
- El entusiasmo (1998) - Isabel (voice)
- Chile Puede (2008) - Ana María
- Escorbo (2009)
- Sal (2011)- María
- Lina from Lima (2019)- Carmen
- Off-Lined (2022)- Victoria

=== Telenovelas ===
- La Reina de Franklin (2018) - Yolanda "Yoli" Garrido
- Sol y Viento (2003) - Maria Sanchez
- Sabor a Ti (Canal 13) (2000) - Antonia Sarmiento
- Fuera de Control (Canal 13) (1999) - Valentina Cervantes
- Amándote (Canal 13) (1998) - Paulina Valdés
- Loca piel (TVN) (1996) - Verónica Alfaro

=== TV series ===
- Experimento Wayapolis(TVN 2009) - Tia Popi(Algunos Capitulos)
- Casado con Hijos (MEGA) (2006–2008) - Quena Gómez de Larraín
- La Otra Cara del Espejo (MEGA) (2006)
- Viva el Teatro (Canal 13) (2005)
- Tiempofinal (TVN)
- Más Que Amigos (Canal 13) (2002) - Claudia
- A la Suerte de la Olla (Canal 13) (2001) - La Pato

=== TV shows ===
- Video Loco (Canal 13) (2000–2001)
- La Ruta de Oceanía (TVN) (2006)
- La Ruta del Nilo (TVN) (2005)
- Conquistadores del Fin del Mundo (2003)
- El Show de Pepito TV (Canal 13) (2001) - Pindi/Various
- Cielo X (Vía X) (1995–1996)
- Si se La puede Gana (Canal 13)
- La Liga 2° Temp. (Mega) (2008)
- Mucho gusto (Mega) (2009–2013)
- La Muralla Infernal (Mega) (2009)
- La Liga 3° Temp. (Mega) (2009)
- Desfachatados (Mega) (2013)
- Buenos días a todos (TVN) (2013–present)

== Theatre ==
- Tristán e Isolda
- Habitación 777
- Chile fertil provincia
- El virus
- ¿Quién dijo que los hombres no sirven para nada?
- Brujas (director)
- Tape
- Entiéndemetuamí (director)
- Te Amo y Te Odio Por Completo (director)
