= Ignacio Gutiérrez (journalist) =

Chilean journalist (born 1976)

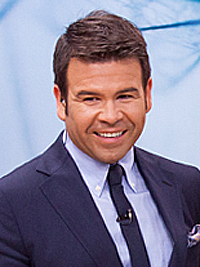
- Born: Ignacio José Gutierrez Castillo; April 29, 1976 (age 48); Constitución, Chile
- Other names: Nacho Gutiérrez
- Occupation(s): Journalist, TV presenter

Ignacio José Gutiérrez Castillo (born April 29, 1976 in Constitución) is a Chilean journalist and television presenter.

== Career ==
He has worked for Chilevisión. In 2016, he took legal action against the company, saying that they had discriminated against him because of his sexuality.

In 2023, he started presenting Tu día on Canal 13.

== Television ==
Year	Program	Role	Channel
2001-2002	Hola Andrea	Reporter	Megavisión
2003–present	SQP	Panelist/Presentetr	Chilevisión
2008–present	Primer plano	Panelist/Presenter	Chilevisión
2011	Infiltradas	Actor (Himself)	Chilevisión
2011	Gala del Festival de Viña del Mar	Presenter	Chilevisión
2012	Gala del Festival de Viña del Mar	Presenter	Chilevisión
2013	La mañana de Chilevisión	Presenter	Chilevisión
2013	Gala del Festival de Viña del Mar	Presenter	Chilevisión

== Other websites ==
- Ignacio Gutiérrez at IMDb
