= Ricardo Rivadeneira =

Chilean politician

President of Renovación Nacional
- In office 1987–1987
- Preceded by: Creation of the charge
- Succeeded by: Sergio Onofre Jarpa

Personal details
- Born: 14 June 1929 Santiago, Chile
- Died: 13 April 2011 (aged 81) Santiago, Chile
- Party: Renovación Nacional
- Education: Pontifical Catholic University of Chile (LL.B); Complutense University of Madrid (LL.M)
- Occupation: Politician
- Profession: Lawyer

Ricardo Rivadeneira Monreal (born 14 June 1929 – 13 June 2011) was a Chilean politician.

He was the first president of Renovación Nacional.
