= Mauricio Jürgensen =

Chilean journalist

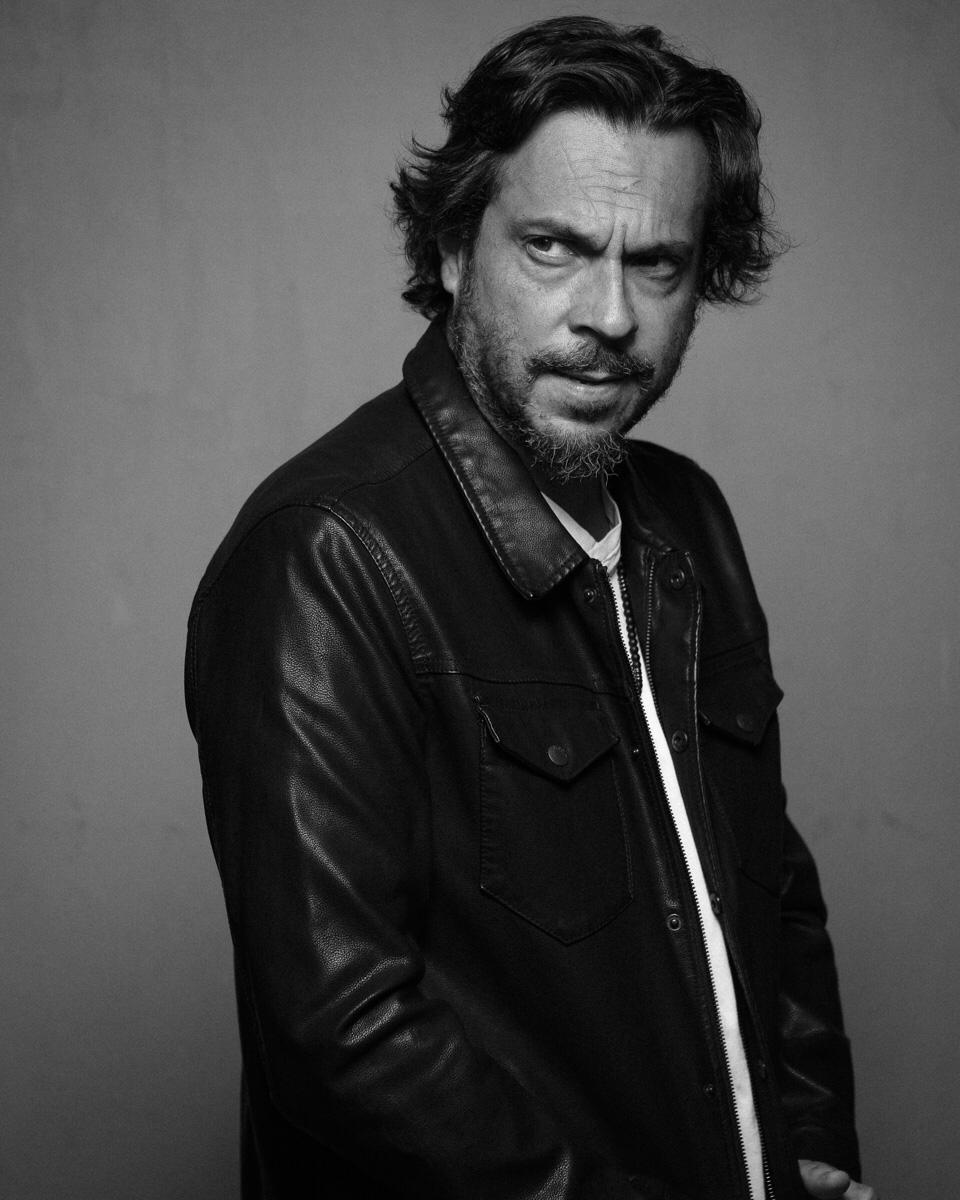

Personal details
- Born: 19 December 1974 (age 51) Viña del Mar, Chile
- Children: Two
- Education: Playa Ancha University (BA)
- Occupation: Pundit musician
- Profession: Journalist

Mauricio Eduardo Jürgensen Roldán (born 19 December 1974) is a Chilean journalist, pundit, and musician.

From 2018 to 2019, he worked as a panelist in the morning show Bienvenidos on Canal 13. Similarly, in that channel he participated as a commentator at the Viña del Mar International Song Festival or also led with Francisca García Huidobro and Maly Jorqueira the late-night talk show «Sigamos de Largo».
