= Muy buenos días =

- Genre: Morning show
- Presented by: Cristián Sánchez; María Luisa Godoy; Ignacio Gutierrez
- Country of origin: Chile
- Original language: Spanish

Production
- Producer: Pablo Manríquez
- Running time: 5 hours

Original release
- Network: TVN
- Release: August 22, 2016 – October 18, 2019

Related
- Buenos días a todos; Buenos días a todos

Muy buenos días (English: Very Good Morning) was a Chilean morning show that was broadcast on TVN from August 22, 2016 to October 21, 2019, replacing Buenos Días a Todos. It was broadcast every Monday to Friday at 08:00 (CLT). It was replaced by Buenos Días a Todos.

== Hosts ==
- Cristián Sánchez
- María Luisa Godoy

== Panelists ==
- Begoña Basauri
- Iván Torres
- Macarena Tondreu
- Andrea Arístegui
- Luis Sandoval

== Journalists ==
- Bernardita Middleton
- Gino Costa

== See also ==
- Televisión Nacional de Chile
