= Playa Ancha University =

Chilean public university

Coordinates: 33°01′19″S 71°38′31″W

Playa Ancha University of Educational Sciences
- Universidad de Playa Ancha de Ciencias de la Educación
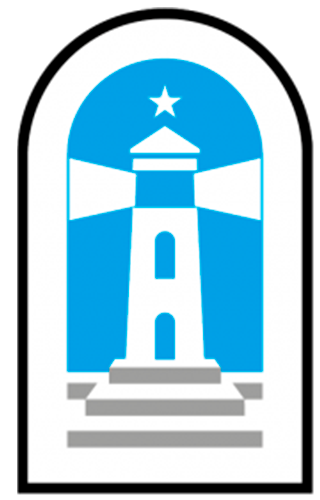
- Logo of the Playa Ancha University
- Motto: Et Tamen Stellae
- Type: Public
- Established: April 1, 1948
- Academic affiliations: CRUCH, CUE, AUGM
- Rector: Patricio Sanhueza Vivanco
- Academic staff: 898
- Undergraduates: 8.314
- Postgraduates: 549
- Location: Valparaíso, V Región, Chile
- Campus: Valparaíso (Main Campus) and San Felipe
- Colors: Light blue & White
- Nickname: Uplanianos
- Mascot: Earless seal
- Website: www.upla.cl
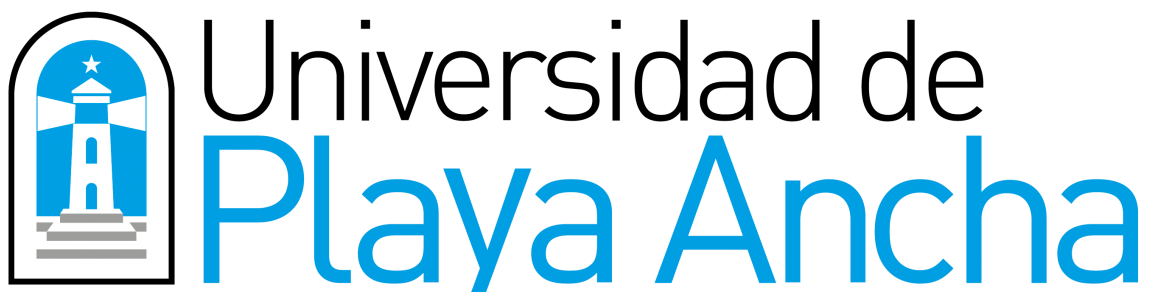

Playa Ancha University of Educational Sciences (Spanish: Universidad de Playa Ancha de Ciencias de la Educación), mostly known as Playa Ancha University or UPLA, is a public university in Valparaíso, Chile. It is part of the Chilean Traditional Universities, belonging to the Council of Rectors, a select group of twenty-five chilean universities. The university has two campuses: the major one in Playa Ancha, Valparaíso, and the second one in San Felipe.

== History ==
The university was founded in 1948 as the Pedagogical Institute of the University of Chile with the intention to enhance the study of languages.

=== The Creation of the Pedagogical Institute (1948–1973) ===
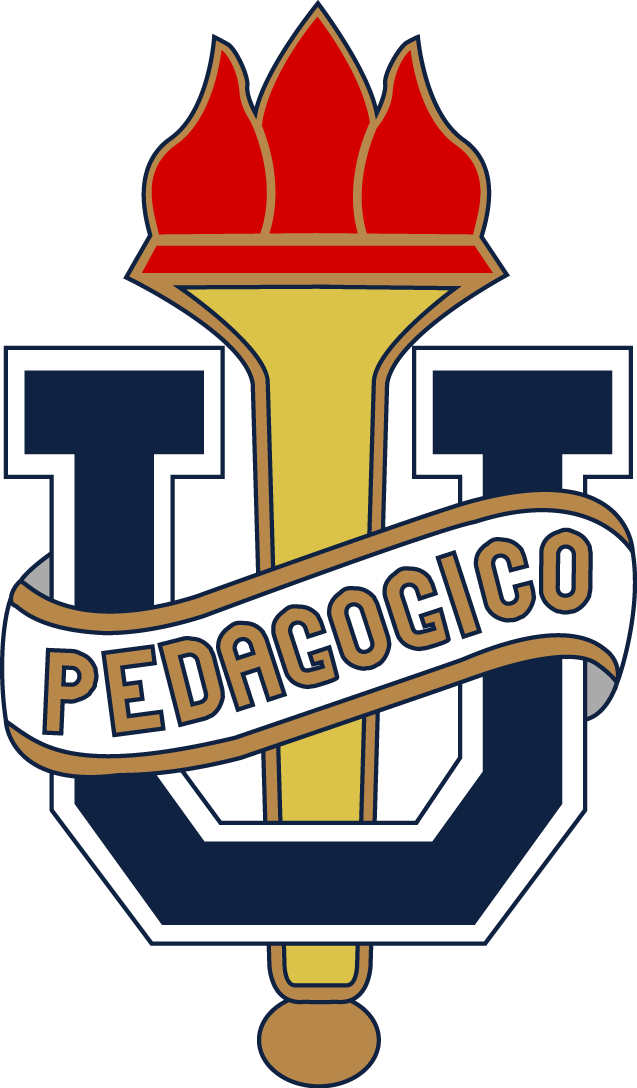
Insignia of the Pedagogical Institute of the University of Chile

The Pedagogical Institute of Valparaíso was founded in 1948, as the initiative of Oscar Guzmán Escobar, a lawyer and professor at the then Valparaíso Law School of the University of Chile, with the intention of promoting the study of Spanish and some foreign languages. It was initially located on Calle Colón in Valparaíso, in the former campus of the current School of Law of the University of Valparaíso, currently the School of Social Work of the same university. It was supported in its initiative by the professors of Valparaíso Emilio Muñoz Mena, Juan Montedónico Napoli and Pedro Contreras Valderrama, among others.

In 1950, due to the quality of its activity, and after inspection by the members of the Faculty of Philosophy and Education of the University of Chile, it received by Supreme Decree the status of State cooperator in education, its exams being valid and rendered before the official commissions designated by the Casa de Bello.

The first courses taught by the then Institute were Pedagogy in Spanish, French and English, while in 1951 a Philosophy course was created and a year later the first School of Journalism in the country and a Women's Normal School were established. The University of Chile initially contributed with very outstanding professors from Santiago, such as Héctor Castillo, Ricardo Benavides, and Professor Cedomil Goic, among others, together with outstanding professors from the region such as Juan Montedónico, Carlos Pantoja Gómez, and Félix Morales Pettorino, who formed a team that took advantage, together with teachers from the Liceo Eduardo de la Barra in Valparaíso and with people who had begun their professional training in Pedagogy, emerging as assistant professors.

Due to the request of its director and the dean of the Faculty of Philosophy and Education of the University of Chile, Mr. Eugenio Pererira Salas, Decree No. 9,118 of October 13, 1954 was issued, on the basis of which the Pedagogical Institute of the University of Chile in Valparaíso was created, which began to function as such the following year. This document was signed by the President of the Republic, Mr. Carlos Ibáñez del Campo, and his Minister of Education, Mr. Tobías Barros Ortiz.

=== The Military Dictatorship (1973–1990) ===
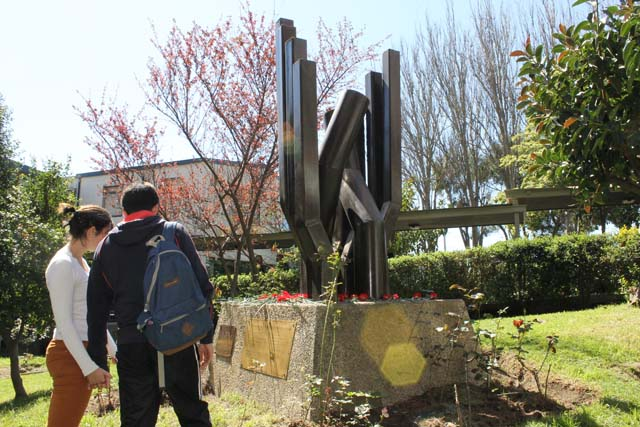
Memorial to students and teachers who were victims of the military dictatorship

On September 11, 1973, a coup d'état took place, to which, according to various accounts, the University did not offer resistance, being invaded by military assault around 12:15 by the "Maipo" 2nd Infantry Regiment, despite the fact that at that time there were already few students at the University (alerted by the situation in the country). The intervention led to massive arrests of students, academics and officials. In 1981 —by decision of the military dictatorship— the Valparaíso branch of the University of Chile was separated from its main campus (located in the city of Santiago de Chile), creating the University of Valparaíso first. Two months later, in a second split, the Faculty of Education and Letters was transformed into the Instituto Profesional Academia Superior de Ciencias Pedagógicas de Valparaíso (Professional Institute of the Higher Academy of Pedagogical Sciences of Valparaíso). This transition meant the significant loss of its infrastructure and the allocation of a reduced state contribution (0.6% of the total direct fiscal contribution), in addition to other problems arising from the policies and definitions implemented by the authoritarian regime that affected academics, officials and students.

Law 18,434 of 4 September 1985, created the Playa Ancha University, which succeeded the Academia Superior de Ciencias Pedagógicas de Valparaíso and the University of Chile.

=== The UPLA nowadays (1990–present) ===
The return to democracy in 1990 brought with it the election of the first democratically elected rector by direct vote of academics, Professor Pedro Norman Cortés Larrieu being elected on that occasion. In 1991, its San Felipe campus began operating. On the other hand, there was an important development of the infrastructure: the Faculty of Arts is built in 1995, the adjacent lands to the central house are acquired, the FEUPLA is put in operation with Confech vote and the kindergarten "Colmenita" is built, with the purpose of providing room to university parents or employees of the University.

With the advent of the year 2000, the changes continue to take place. The new building of Natural and Exact Sciences is inaugurated, as well as the Faculty of Social Sciences, which offers degrees in Sociology (2002), Psychology (2013), Journalism and Library Science. The performing arts hall (for students of Theatre) is created, and moving the casino to a new location next to the Faculty of Arts. In 2008 the new University library is inaugurated.

Towards 2013, the Faculty of Health and Engineering is created, acquiring the Independencia campus. In 2012 two multipurpose domes were acquired, one located in the Patio de los Vientos, next to the Faculty of Arts, and the other in the San Felipe Campus. In 2014 the Nursing laboratories were created, in 2012 the Center for Advanced Studies (CEA) and the Vice-Rector's Office for Research, Innovation and Postgraduate Studies were installed in Viña del Mar.

In October 2014, with 71.5% of the votes in a trystman plebiscite, the elimination of the Board of Directors and the creation of a University Senate, which represents the three estates, students, officials and academics, is approved.

== Symbols ==
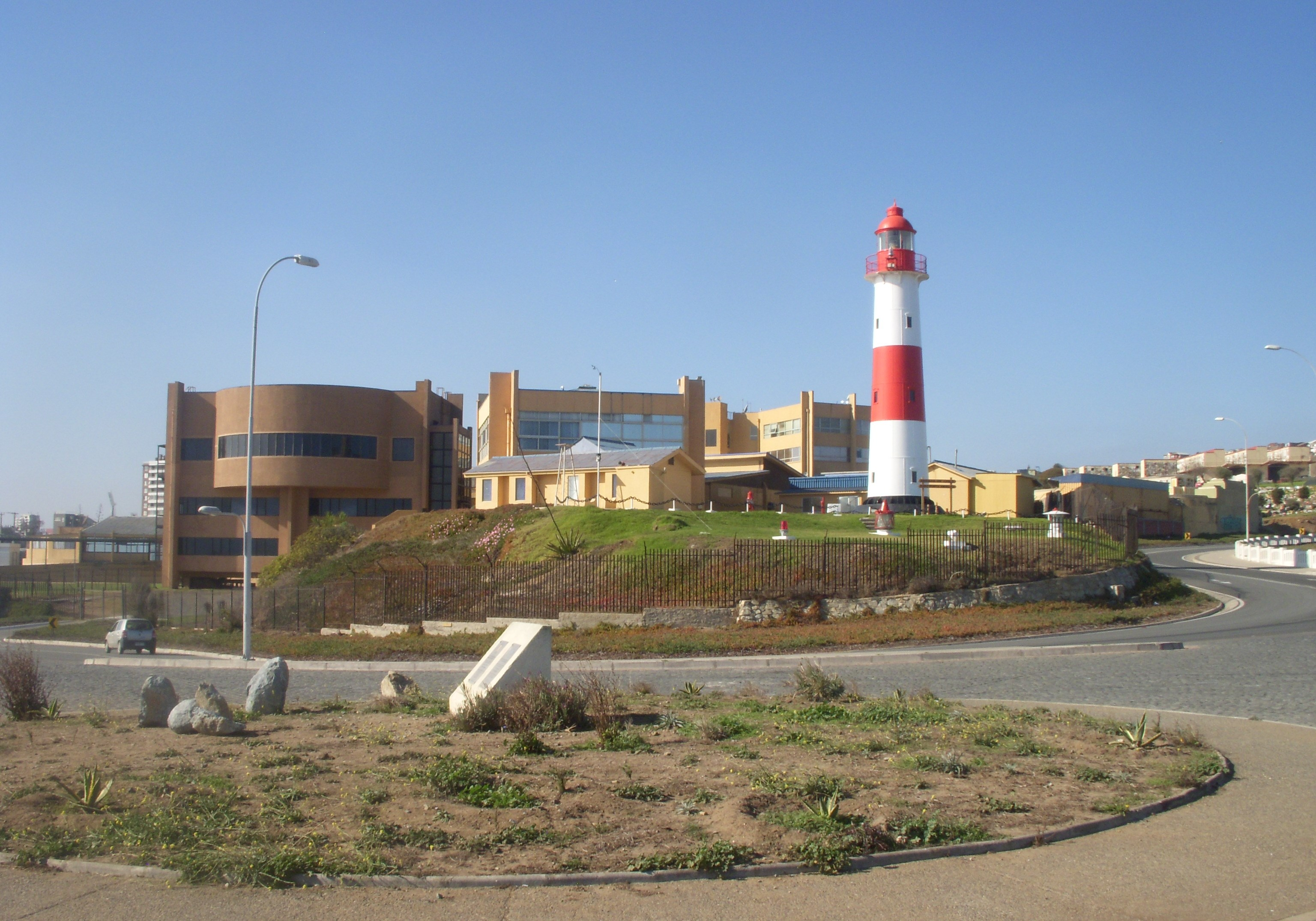
Punta Angeles Lighthouse, symbol of the Playa Ancha University

=== Emblem ===
The emblem of the Playa Ancha University is a lighthouse illuminating both sectors with a lone star leading the way (in reference to being at night). Its inspiration comes from the Punta Ángeles Lighthouse, created in 1837 under the presidency of José Joaquín Prieto. This is located next to the University.

== Faculties and careers ==
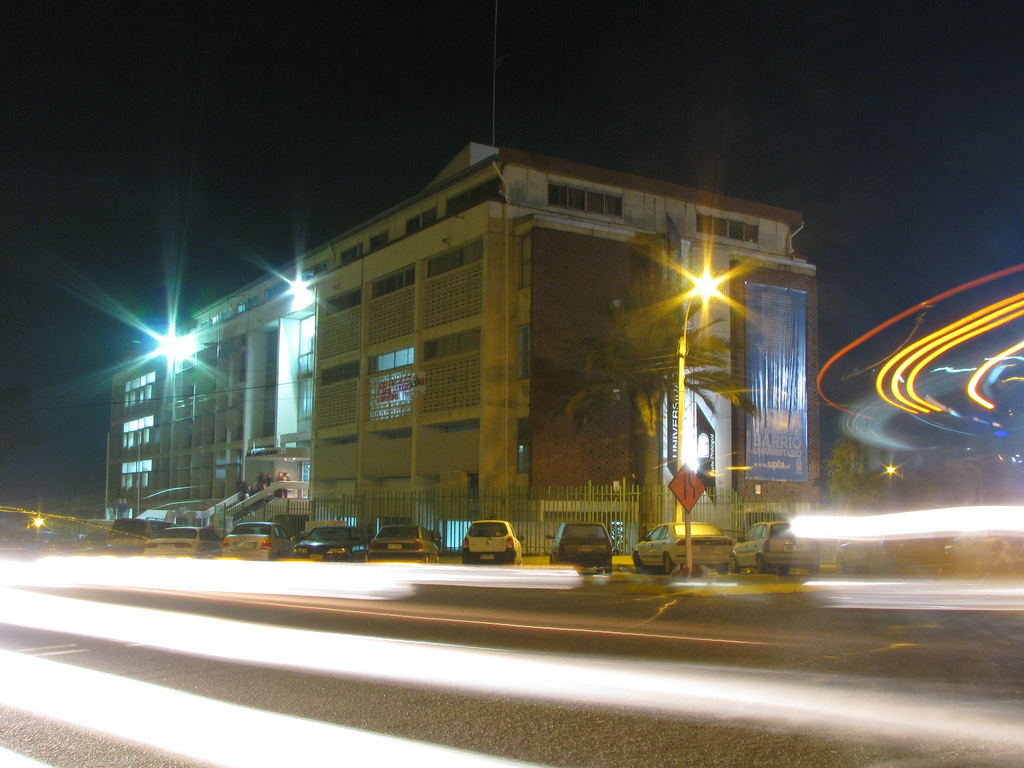
Main Campus

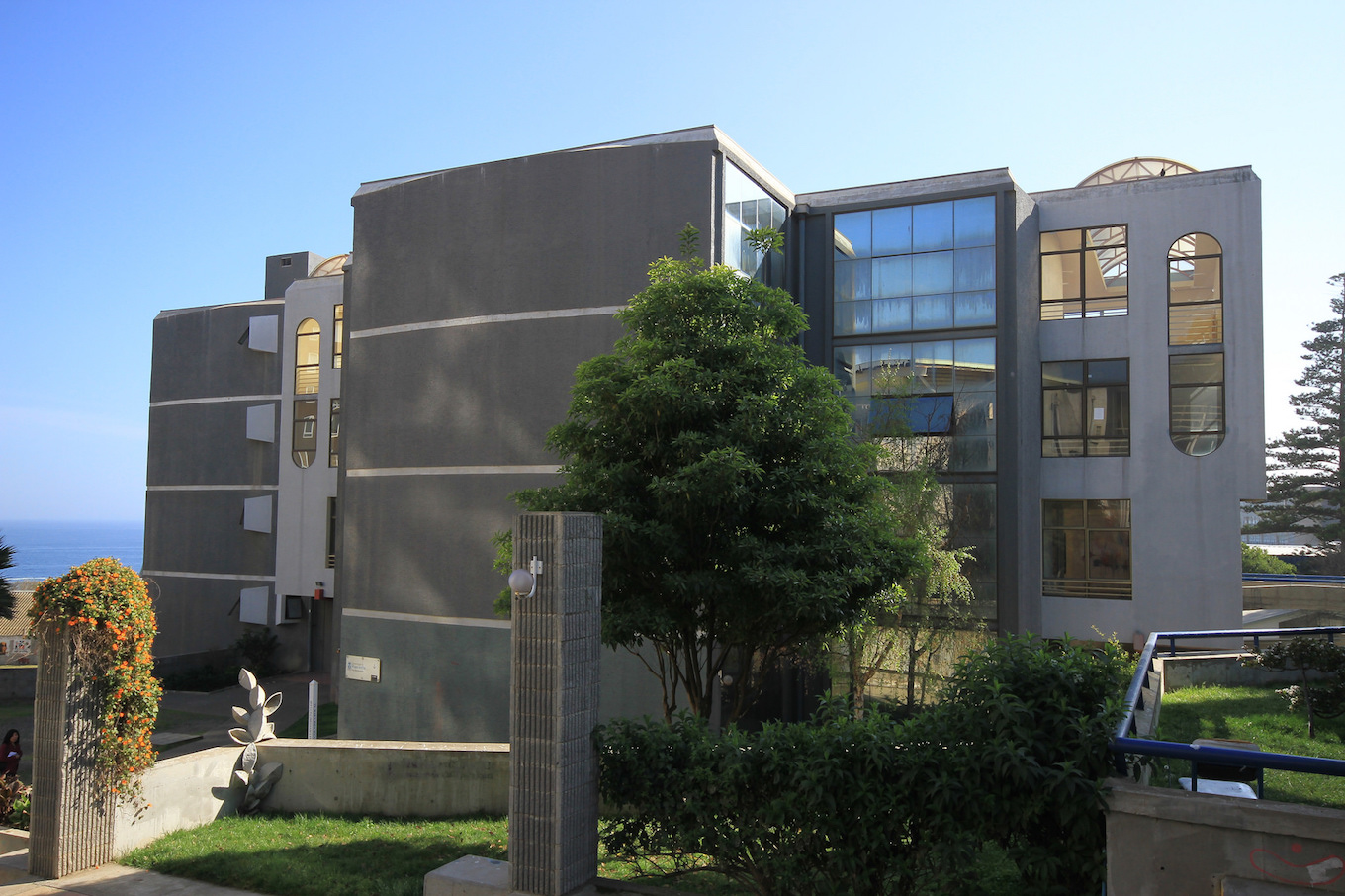
Faculty of Arts

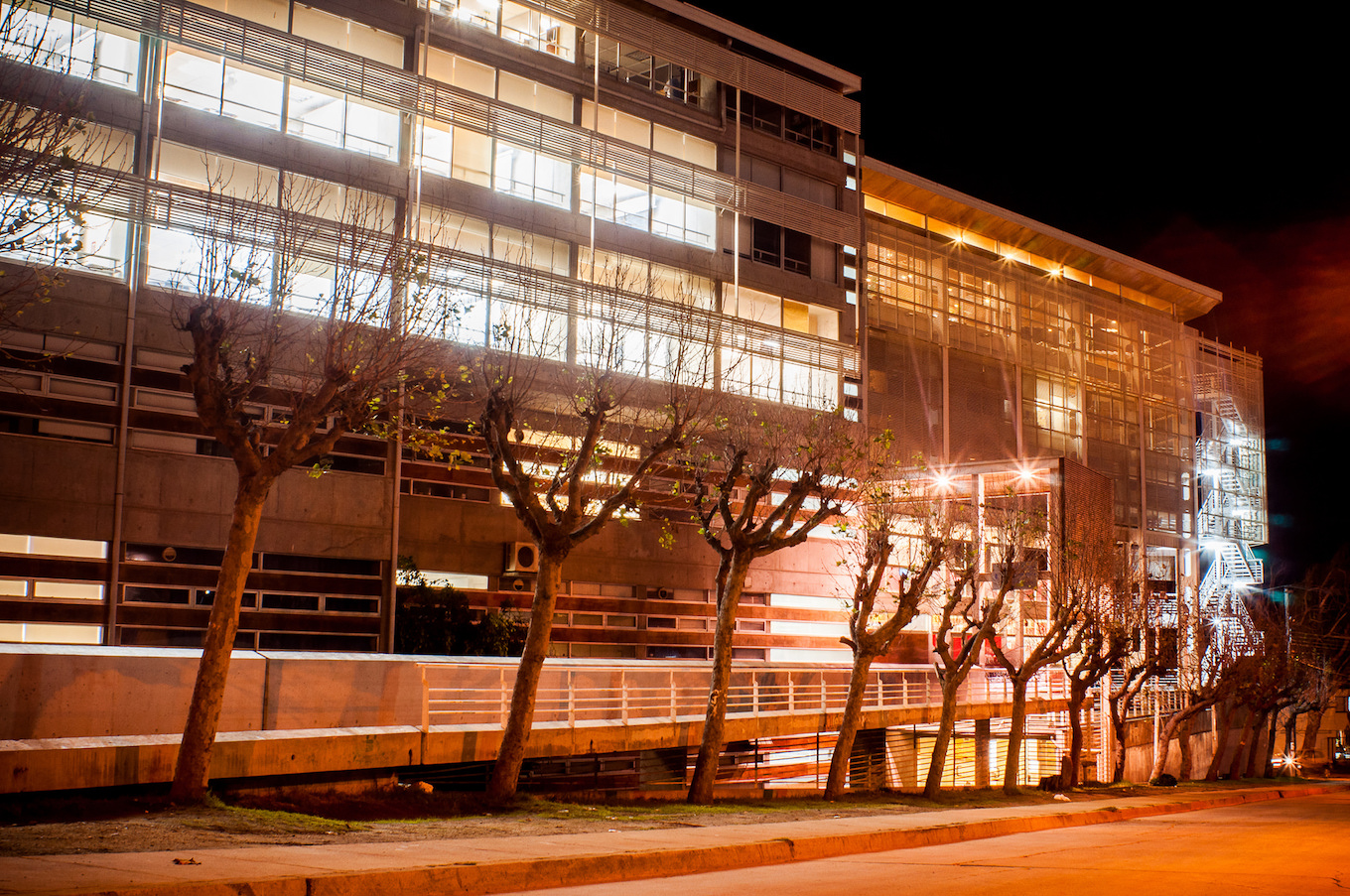
Faculty of Science and Engineering

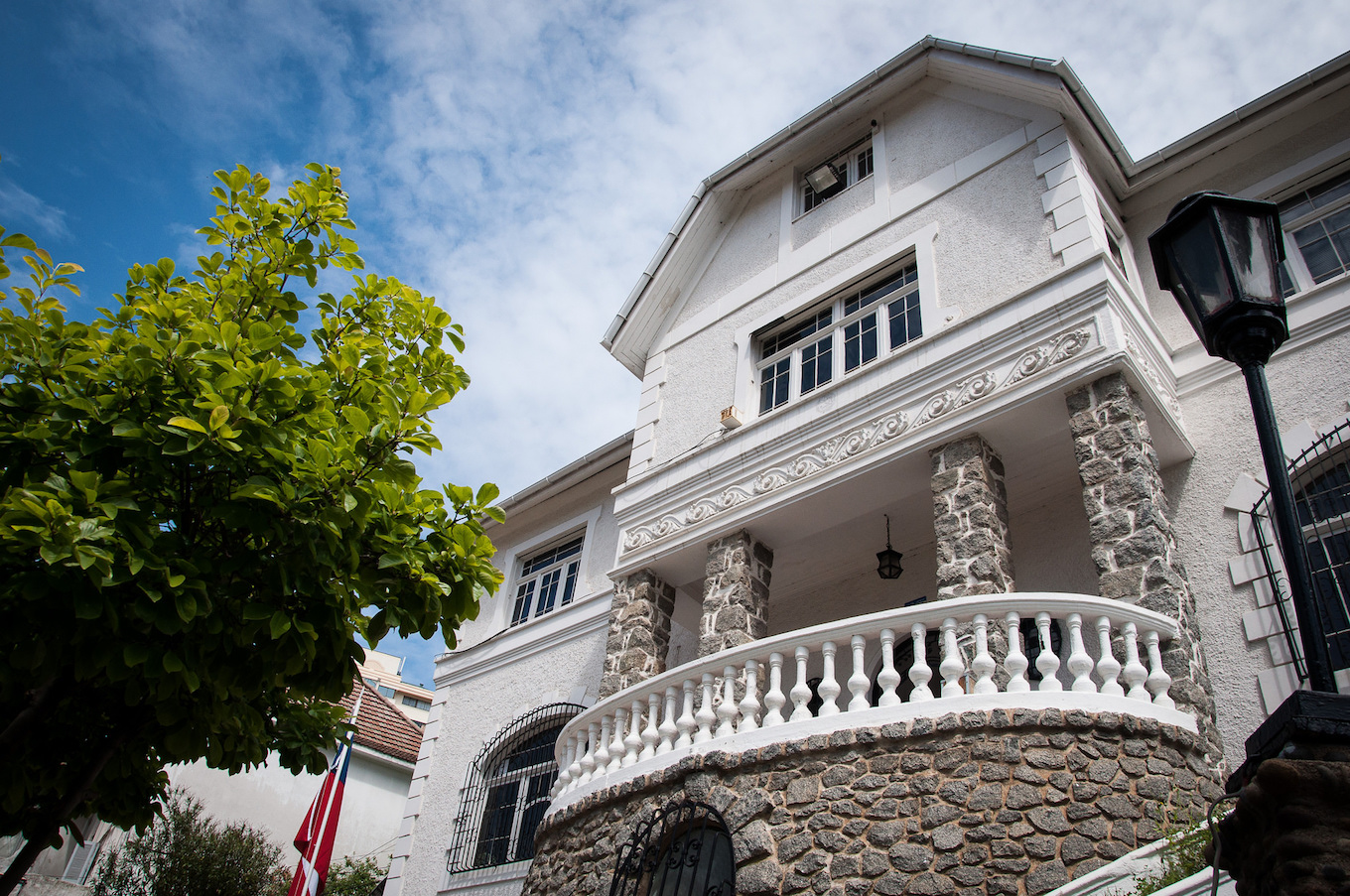
Traslaviña Campus

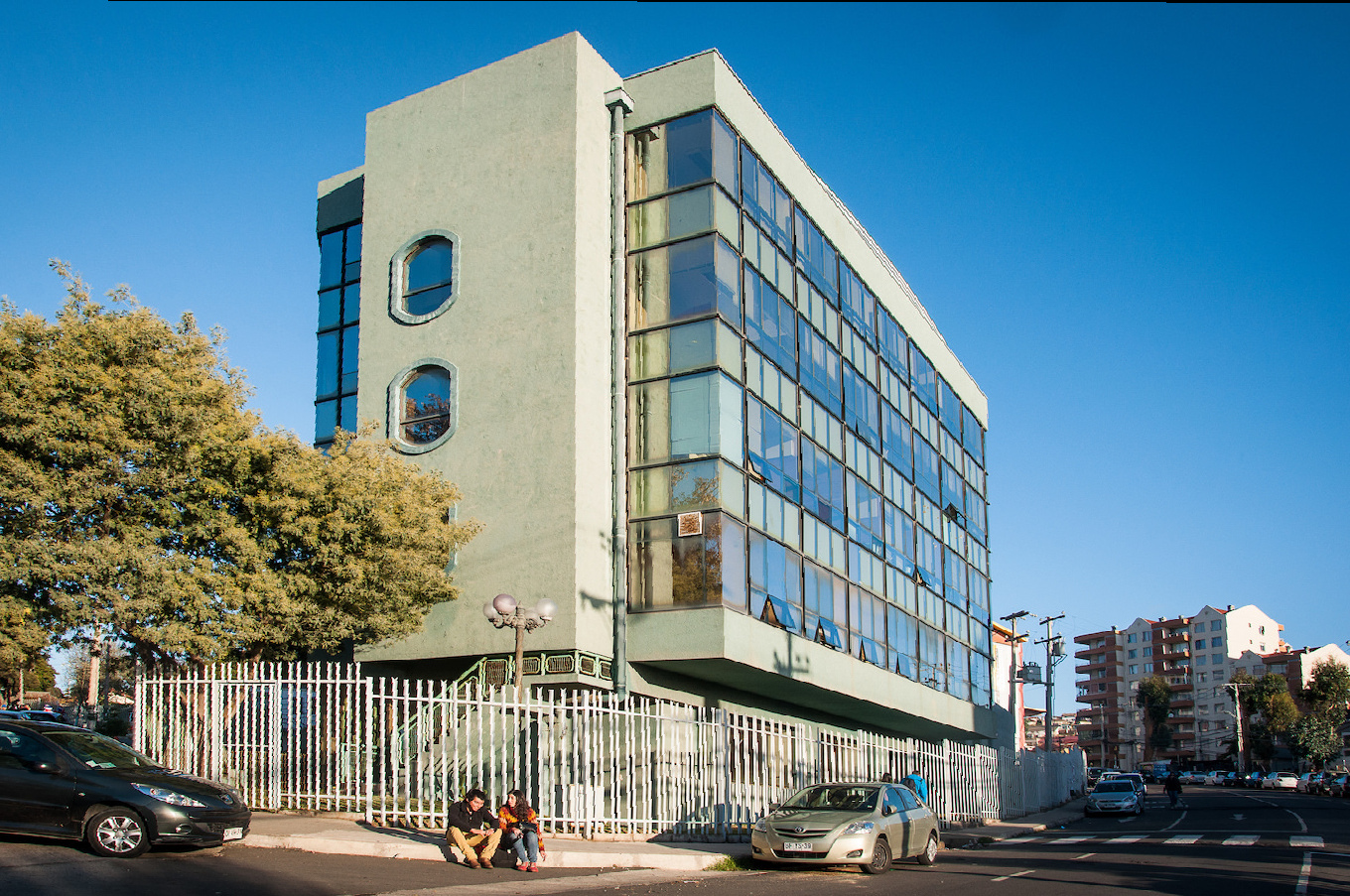
Puntángeles Building

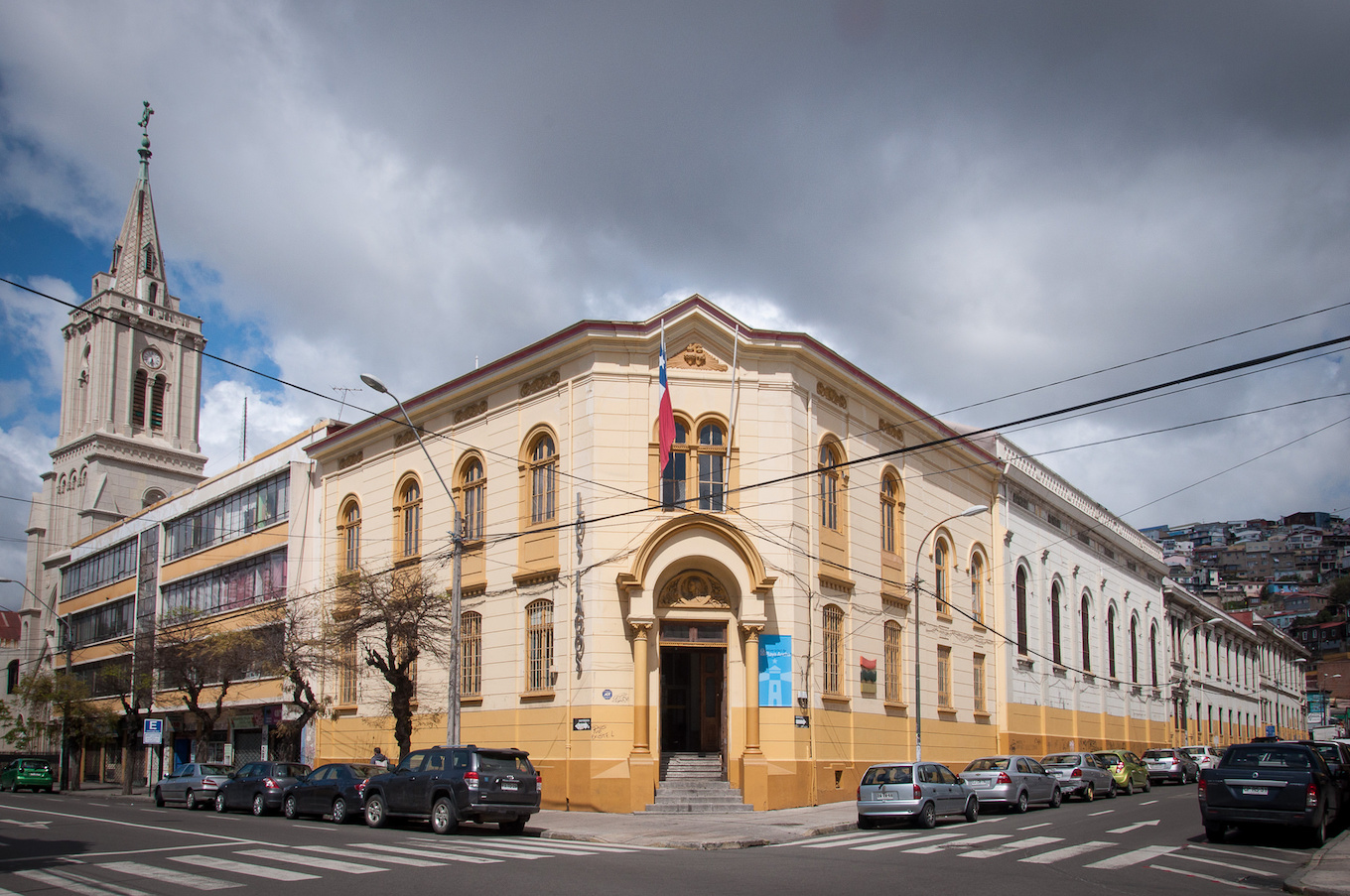
Independencia Campus

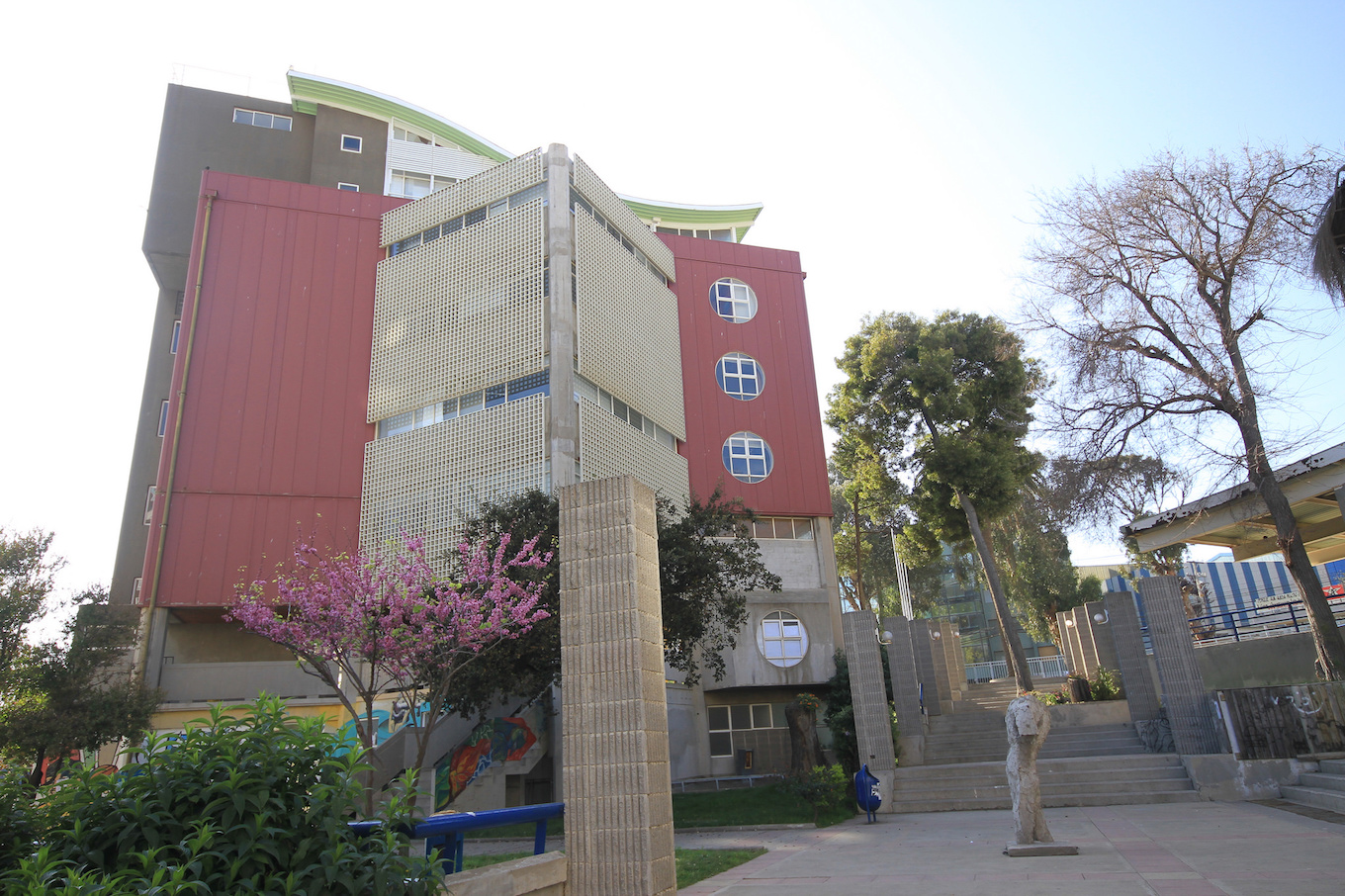
Institutional Building

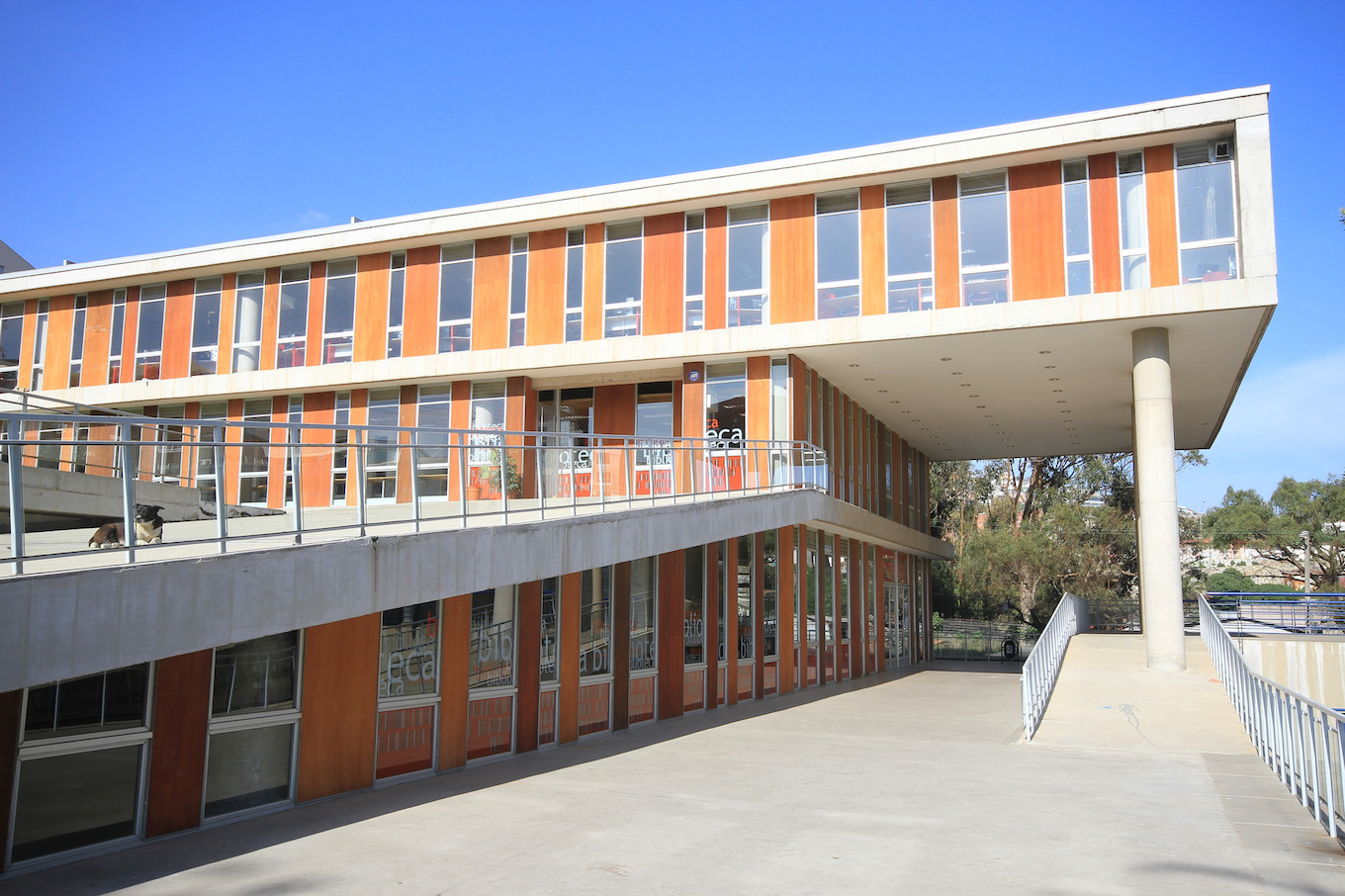
Library

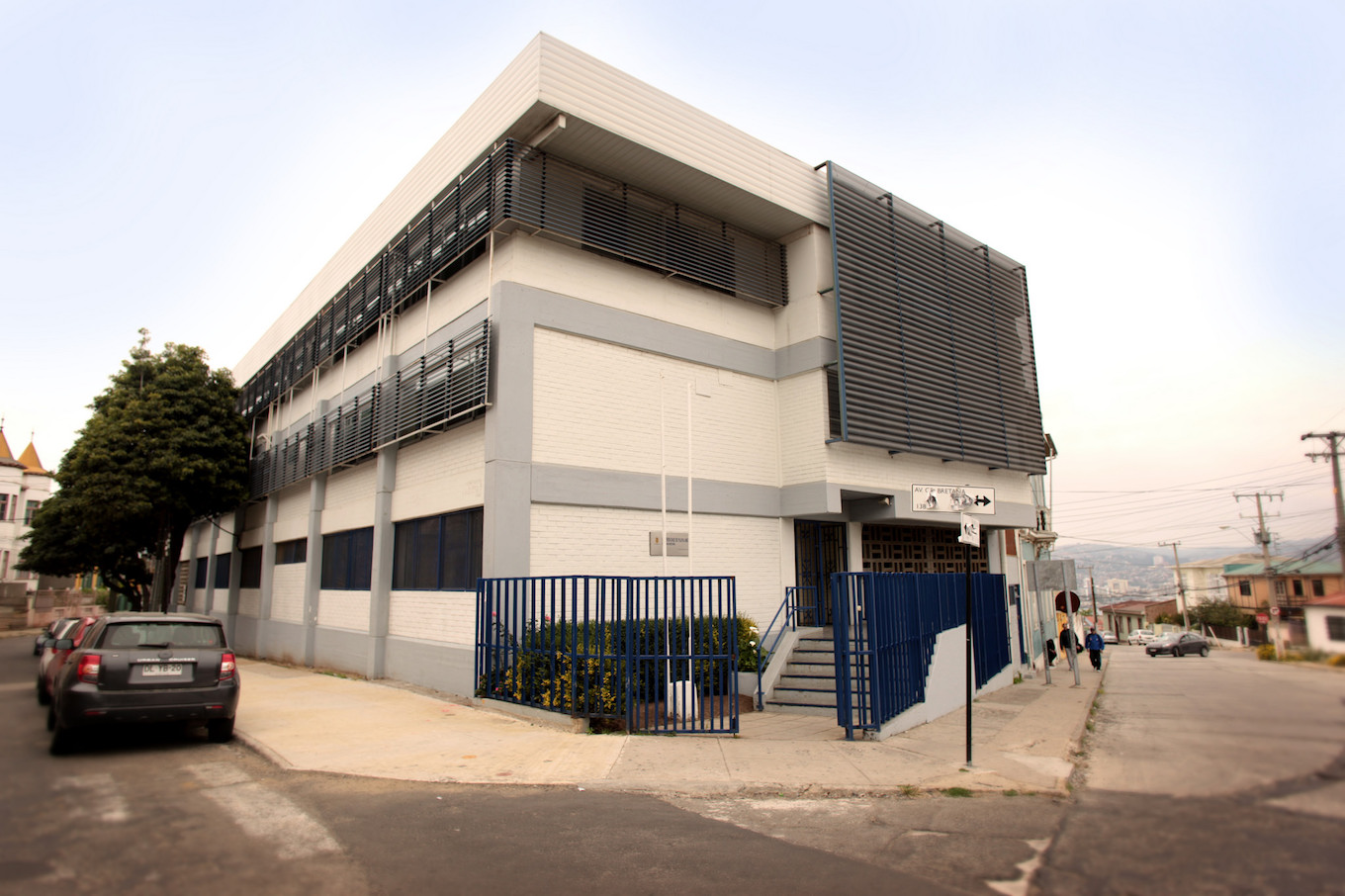
Gran Bretaña Building

The Playa Ancha University has 36 undergraduate degrees in Valparaiso (of which 3 are dual day and evening courses) and 6 in San Felipe. Additionally, it has 14 technical careers (7 in Valparaíso and 7 in San Felipe)

=== Humanities ===
- Multilingual touristic administration
- Geography
- Pedagogy in Spanish language
- Pedagogy in Philosophy
- Pedagogy in History and Geography
- Pedagogy in English
- English-Spanish Translation and Interpreting

=== Arts ===
- Design draftsman
- Graphic design
- Graduate in Arts
- Pedagogy in Plastic Arts
- Pedagogy in Musical Education
- Pedagogy in Technological Education
- Theatre (Acting)

=== Education ===
- Pedagogy in Special Education
- Preschool Education
- Pedagogy in Primary Education
- Pedagogy in Primary Education, with Mentions of Rural Education and Development

=== Natural Sciences ===
- Pedagogy in Biology and Sciences
- Pedagogy in Physics and Computing
- Pedagogy in Mathematics and Computing
- Pedagogy in Chemistry and Sciences

=== School of Cs. Physical Activity and Sport ===
- Pedagogy in Physical Education, Ladies
- Pedagogy in Physical Education, Men
- Technology in Sports and Entertaining

=== Social Sciences ===
- Laws
- Librarianship
- Journalism
- Sociology
- Psychology

=== Engineering ===
- Environmental Engineering
- Environmental Civil Engineering
- Industrial Civil Engineering
- Engineering in Informatics
- Statistical Engineering

=== Health Sciences ===
- Nursing
- phonoaudiology
- Kinesiology
- Nutrition and Dietetics
- Occupational Therapy

== Organization ==
The Playa Ancha University has a campus in San Felipe which has been operating since 1991, in addition to its campus and university district located in Valparaiso.

In 2007 the construction of the new university library began, located near the most important buildings of the institution.

=== Administration ===
During its existence, the Playa Ancha University has belonged to the University of Chile, depending directly on the Faculty of Humanities and Letters of Santiago; and, after the 1968 University Reform, to the Valparaíso branch of the Casa de Bello, both as an Area-Faculty of Humanities, at first, and later as a Faculty of Education and Letters. This determined that its superior authorities were named Director, and later, Dean.

As a consequence of the 1981 University Reform, it became an independent entity, either as the Higher Academy of Pedagogical Sciences of Valparaíso, or as the University of Playa Ancha. Here, its superior authority is called Rector.

==== Directors, Pedagogical Institute of Valparaíso – University of Chile ====
Oscar Guzmán Escobar (1948–1955) [Private]

Milton Rossel Acuña (1955–1957)

Juan Uribe Echevarría (1957–1961)

Rodolfo Iturriaga Jamett (1961–1965)

Carlos Pantoja Gómez (1965–1969)

==== Deans, Faculty of Humanities/Education and Literature. Valparaiso Campus – University of Chile ====
Raúl Páez Boggioni (1969–1972)

Marcelo Blanc Masías (1972–1973)

Victor Leighton Gonzalez (1973–1975)

Olga Arellano Salgado (1976–1981)

==== Rectors, Higher Academy of Pedagogical Sciences/Playa Ancha University ====
Olga Arellano Salgado (1981–1987)

Mariana Martelli Ukrow (1987–1990)

Norman Cortés Larreau (1990–1998)

Oscar Quiroz Mejías (1998–2006)

Patricio Sanhueza Vivanco (2006–2026)

== Notable alumni ==
- Sergio Badilla Castillo
- Yasna Provoste
