= Cinema of Chile =

- No. of screens: 347 (2013)
  - Per capita: 2.0 per 100,000 (2011)
- Main distributors: Andes Films 28.0% UIP 22.0% Warner 19.0%

Produced feature films (2011)
- Fictional: 13 (56.4%)
- Animated: 3 (1.2%)
- Documentary: 10 (43.5%)

Number of admissions (2013)
- Total: 21,019,442
- National films: 1,914,511 (9.1%)

Gross box office (2013)
- Total: CLP 62 billion
- National films: CLP 6.6 billion (10.7%)

Chilean cinema refers to all films produced in Chile or made by Chileans. It had its origins at the start of the 20th century with the first Chilean film screening in 1902 and the first Chilean feature film appearing in 1910. The oldest surviving feature is El Húsar de la Muerte (1925), and the last silent film was Patrullas de Avanzada (1931). The Chilean film industry struggled in the late 1940s and in the 1950s, despite some box-office successes such as El Diamante de Maharajá. The 1960s saw the development of the "New Chilean Cinema", with films like Three Sad Tigers (1968), Jackal of Nahueltoro (1969) and Valparaíso mi amor (1969). After the 1973 military coup, film production was low, with many filmmakers working in exile. It increased after the end of the Pinochet regime in 1989, with occasional critical and/or popular successes such as Johnny cien pesos (1993), Historias de Fútbol (1997) and Gringuito (1998).

Greater box office success came in the late 1990s and early 2000s with films like El Chacotero Sentimental: la película (1999), Sexo con Amor (2003), Sub Terra (2003), and Machuca (2004) all of which were surpassed by Stefan v/s Kramer (2012) and Sin filtro (2016).

In recent years, Chilean films have made increasingly regular appearances at international film festivals, with No (2012) becoming the first Chilean film nominated for the Academy Award for Best Foreign Language Film and A Fantastic Woman (2017) the first to win it.

== History ==
=== Origins ===
On 17 February 1895 entrepreneur Francisco de Paula Casajuana Granada presented the first Kinetoscope, an early motion picture exhibition device, in Santiago. Next year, on 25 August 1896, the first Cinématographe reels were shown to an astounded audience in Santiago. These were the same movies that only eight months earlier, the Lumiere Brothers had shown in Paris.

In the north of Chile, the Potassium nitrate mining industry created enough wealth to allow cities like Antofagasta and Iquique some privileges rare in other parts of the country. In Iquique, photographer Luis Oddó Osorio was enthralled by this new technology and started to create his own short films. On 20 May 1897, he screened the short documentary "Una cueca en Cavancha" in the Great Philharmonic Hall on Tarapaca Street. Osorio followed his first short with "El desfile en honor del Brasil", "La llegada de un tren de pasajeros a la estación de Iquique", "Bomba Tarapacá Nº7" and "Grupo de gananciosos en la partida de football".

In 1897, some circuses began to screen movies, which attracted great interest at first but soon trailed off due to the lack of new material. In the same year in Santiago, two new movie venues opened which both featured Edison's Vitascope, less popular than the Cinématographe. In June that year, the Bioscop was also launched as another alternative to the cinematographe, although it eventually failed. By the end of the year, all these new places would be closed.

In 1900, the Apollo Theatre in Santiago exhibited the film "Carreras en Viña", (Racing in Viña) and some other foreign films. The exact date that the films screened and further details of this event remain unknown.

In the port city of Valparaíso, the first film ever fully produced in Chile was launched at the Teatro ODEON on 26 May 1902. The film, Ejercicio General del Cuerpo de Bomberos (General Practice of the Fire Department), filmed on 20 May the same year, was only three minutes long and showed the annual public show performed by the Valparaíso Fire Department in the city's Aníbal Pinto square. Nothing is known of the film's director, cinematographer or production team, and only 27 seconds of footage remain today, held by the Catholic University of Valparaíso.

In 1903, "Un paseo por playa ancha" (A walk through Playa Ancha) was filmed in Valparaíso by Maurice Albert Massonnier. The film is split into three parts. First, a huaso charges into the scene, causing some commotion among the people around, and dances the traditional Chilean cueca accompanied by musicians. This is followed by a scene where the characters eat a Chilean Cazuela. Finally, in the last scene, a fight breaks but is quickly controlled by a guard. Maurice Albert Massonnier was sent to Chile by the Lumiere Brothers' company, one of many sent around the world to document and produce films for them. After screening his film in Chile, Massonnier sent the film to Paris, where several copies were made. One of those copies was found in 1994 by Chilean film restorer Daniel Sandoval in an archive on Bois-d'Arcy. "Un paseo por playa ancha" is now the oldest surviving Chilean movie. Massonier ended up settling in Chile and made his own production company, "Empresa Massonnier y Ca".

Un Paseo a Playa Ancha (1903), the oldest surviving Chilean film, by Maurice Albert Massonnier

=== The silent era ===
Manuel Rodríguez (fragment)

Film production boomed in Chile in the silent era, with 78 films released between 1910 and 1931. The first full-length film, Manuel Rodríguez, was released in 1910. Directed by Adolfo Urzúa, and starring Nicanor de la Sotta, it told the story of Manuel Rodríguez Erdoíza, who fought for Chile's independence from Spain until his death in 1818.

Among the many Chilean directors who took up the art in this period – Salvatore Giambastini, Juan Pérez Berrocal, Jorge "Coke" Délano, Nicanor de la Sotta, Carlos Borcosque and Alberto Santana – one name in particular stands out for film historians: Pedro Sienna, a former stage actor who went on to direct and act in some of the best films of the age. It was Sienna who wrote, directed and starred in the first Chilean feature-length film that has survived to this day, El Húsar de la Muerte (The Hussar of the Dead).

Premiered in Santiago on 24 November 1925, El Húsar de la Muerte – like Adolfo Urzúa's eponymous Manuel Rodríguez – tells the story of Manuel Rodríguez Erdoíza. The film was restored in 1962 by the University of Chile's film archive, with a musical soundtrack by well-known Chilean composer and pianist Sergio Ortega. El Húsar de la Muerte was shown in the Treasures from the Archives category of the 2005 London Film Festival. Critic Carolina Robino described El Húsar de la Muerte in BBC Mundo as "an extremely refined film for its era. The visual imagery has an extraordinary richness. Sienna plays masterfully with the time-shifts, with the subjective view of the characters and with their thoughts. Without words, it tells an epic story with exquisite touches of humor and provides an accurate description of Chilean colonial society."

The last silent movie produced in Chile was Patrullas de Avanzada (Advanced Patrol), directed by Eric Page and released in 1931.

=== 1940s and 1960s ===
In 1942, the Chilean Production Development Corporation (Spanish: "Corporación de Fomento de la Producción" or CORFO) created the Chile Films project, which provided filmmakers with technical resources and supported the Chilean film industry. One of the films supported by the CORFO is the film animated titled 15 mil dibujos. Despite this, the industry began to struggle in the late 1940s with some studios experiencing financial difficulties. Large sums of money were spent on cinematic "super-productions" to attract foreign directors, but most failed to make a profit. One film which did buck the trend, however, was adventure-comedy El Diamante de Maharajá (The Maharaja Diamond), starring comedian Lucho Córdoba, which was a box-office hit.

The low-output trend continued into the 1950s, with only 13 films released in Chile over the course of the decade. Towards the end of the 1950s, however, two films appeared which gave a taste of the new wave of socially conscious cinema that would sweep Chile in the 1960s: Naum Kramarenko's Tres miradas a la calle (Three Views of the Street, 1957) and Deja que los perros ladren (Let the Dogs Bark, 1961).

=== The "New Chilean Cinema", 1960s-1989 ===
In the 1960s, a vibrant national film culture developed which came to be known as the "New Chilean Cinema" (Spanish: Nuevo Cine Chileno). An experimental film department was founded at the University of Chile, along with a Film Institute at the Catholic University of Chile. The industry also received support from the revitalised Chile Films project which had begun in the 1940s. During this period, young directors such as Raúl Ruiz, Patricio Guzmán, Aldo Francia, Helvio Soto and Miguel Littín emerged, along with a new genre inspired by social and political currents on the 1960s, the documentary.

The first ever "Festival del Nuevo Cine Latinoamericano" (New Latin American Film Festival) took place in Viña del Mar in 1967. Shortly afterwards some of the most important films from the New Chilean Cinema period were released: veteran Patricio Kaulen's Largo viaje (1967), Raúl Ruiz's Three Sad Tigers (1968), Miguel Littín's Jackal of Nahueltoro (1969), Aldo Francia's Valparaíso mi amor (1969) and Helvio Soto's Caliche sangriento (1969).

Politics was a key theme for Chilean cinema in the 1960s and beyond, as it was for similar movements in other South American countries (the Cinema Novo of Brazil and the Nueva Cinema of Argentina) and for Chilean movements in other fields of the arts, such as the Nueva Canción Chilena (New Chilean Song). "This left-wing Chilean filmmakers' movement cannot be understood without connecting it to the emerging social and political identity of the American continent", states the Chilean cultural website Memoria Chilena.

The 1973 military coup drove many filmmakers abroad, where they continued to make films reflecting on and criticising the Chilean military government under Augusto Pinochet. Memoria Chilena says: "The premises of the Nuevo Cine did not die with the massive exile of filmmakers. Instead they were reinterpreted in the cinema of exile as protest against the repression under the military regime or expressing nostalgia for the shattered revolution." Some of the best known include The Promised Land (1973), Il pleut sur Santiago (1975), Dialogues of Exiles (1975), Actas de Marusia (1975), Cantata de Chile (1976), Noch nad Chili (1977), The Battle of Chile (1979), Marilú Mallet's Journal inachevé (1982), Angelina Vásquez's Presencia lejana (1982) and Acta General de Chile (1986).

=== Transition post-dictatorship, 1989-1999 ===
Film production within Chile was relatively low throughout the military regime, with most filmmakers working in exile, but began to increase again when the regime ended in 1989. In 1992, the FONDART national art fund was established which would go on to support some 90% of Chilean feature-length films made since its creation. Although many films released in the late 1980s and early 1990s received both public and critical acclaim, including Johnny Cien Pesos (Hundred Peso Johnny, 1993) by Gustavo Graef-Marino; Historias de Fútbol (Soccer Stories, 1997) the debut film from Andrés Wood and Gringuito (1998) by Sergio Castilla, Chilean movies struggled to compete with international films for audience numbers.

The next decade saw this trend begin to change. The more commercial 1999 release El Chacotero Sentimental (The Sentimental Joker), by Cristián Galaz, broke Chilean box office records.

=== International awards since 2000 ===
Since 2000, Chilean films were box-office successes like Jorge Olguín's Ángel Negro (Black Angel, 2000) and Alejandro Rojas' Ogú y Mampato en Rapa Nui (Ogú and Mampato on Easter Island, 2002). In 2003, the comedy Sexo con Amor (Sex with Love) by Boris Quercia set a new national box office record which would remain unbroken until 2012. Chilean films also began to win awards at noted international festivals. Silvio Caiozzi's Coronación (Coronation, 2000) won prizes at the Montreal, Huelva, Cartagena and Havana film festivals; Andrés Wood's La Fiebre del Loco (Abalone Fever, 2001) won at Cartagena and Lleida; and Taxi Para Tres (Taxi For Three, 2001) by Orlando Lübbert won at Cartagena, Havana, Mar del Plata, Miami and San Sebastián.

Chilean President Ricardo Lagos founded the National Council of Culture and the Arts in 2003 and, since 2005, FONDART has been supplemented by additional competitive State funds which are allocated to encourage film production, distribution, literacy and heritage through the Consejo del Arte y la Industria Audiovisual (CAIA) and the Fondo de Fomento Audiovisual.

- A Cab for Three (Taxi para tres, 2002), directed by Orlando Lübbert.

Nominated for Best Ibero-American Film (Mejor Película Iberoamericana) in the Ariel Awards. Nominated for Best Film (Mejor Película) at the Cartagena Film Festival and won two "India Catalina" awards there, for Best Supporting Actor and Best Screenplay. Nominated for Best Spanish Language Foreign Film at the Goya Awards . Won Golden Kikito for Best Actor in the Latin Film section of the Festival de Gramado, and nominated for Best Film overall. Won three awards at the Havana Film Festival: Best Screenplay; Glauber Rocha Award - Special Mention; and the Grand Coral - Third Prize, all presented to Lübbert. Won Favorite Film at the MTV Movie Awards, Latin America. Won Best Screenplay at the Lima Latin American Film Festival. Awarded with a Special Mention for Best Film at the Mar del Plata Film Festival. Won the Grand Jury Prize at the Miami Film Festival. Won the Golden Seashell in the San Sebastián International Film Festival.

- Machuca, 2004, by Andrés Wood.

Won Most Popular International Film at the 2004 Vancouver International Film Festival. Nominated for the Ariel Award, the Mexican Academy of Film awards, in the Best Iberoamerican Film category. In 2005, won the PFS Award at the Political Film Society Awards. Won Best Cinematography - Gran Premio Coral in the Havana Film Festival, Cuba. Won Best Narrative Latin American Film in the FICCO, Mexico. Won the audience award at the Philadelphia Film Festival. Won the Golden Circle Award at the Bogota International Film Festival. Won Best Film at the Valdivia International Film Festival. Was voted Most Popular Film in the Vancouver International Film Festival.

- Tony Manero, 2008, directed by Pablo Larraín.

Won the top prize at the 2008 Torino Film Festival. Was Chile's submission to the 81st Academy Awards for the Academy Award for Best Foreign Language Film. In 2009, won the Golden Tulip - Best Film at the Istanbul International Film Festival. Won two of its three nominations at the Buenos Aires International Festival of Independent Cinema for the Best Actor and for the FEISAL Award. Won Best Actor at the Cinemanila International Film Festival Won two prizes at the Havana Film Festival, Best Actor and the Grand Coral - First Prize. Received a Special Mention in the Ibero-American Competition of the Miami Film Festival. Won a KNF Award at the Rotterdam International Film Festival Won a Special Jury Award in the Free Spirit Competition at the Warsaw International Film Festival.

- The Maid 2009, directed by Sebastián Silva.

Won the World Cinema: Dramatic prize at Sundance in 2009 Won the Golden Globe for Best Foreign Language Film in 2010. Won the Golden India Catalina prize for Best Actress at the Cartagena Film Festival for Catalina Saavedra. Won "Breakthrough Actress" for Saavedra at the Gotham Independent Film Awards Won Best Actress for Saavedra at the Lleida Latin-American Film Festival, along with Best Film. Won Best Narrative Film at the Sarasota Film Festival. Won the Talent Tape Award at the Fribourg International Film Festival. Received a Special Mention at the Taipei Film Festival. Won the Critics Award and the Elcine First Prize - Best Film at the Latin American Film Festival. Won the Satellite Award for Best Foreign Language Film in 2009. Won the Colón de Oro for Best Feature film at the Huelva Latin American Film Festival. Won the FIPRESCI Prize - Best Film in the Guadalajara International Film Festival. Sebastián Silva also won the Inspiration Award, the International Film Guide Inspiration Award and the Jordan Alexander Kressler Screenwriting Award, and Catalina Saavedra received a Special Mention - Best Actress - Ibero-American Competition in the Miami International Film Festival. The film has also been nominated for awards in several other major film festivals.

- The Life of Fish, 2010, directed by Matías Bize.

Selected as the Chilean entry for the Best Foreign Language Film at the 83rd Academy Awards, but didn't make the final shortlist. Won the Best Spanish Language Foreign Film (Mejor Película Hispanoamericana) in the Goya Awards. Won the Jury Award - Best Director at the Los Angeles Latino International Film Festival Nominated for Best feature Film at Oslo Films from the South Festival.

- Nostalgia for the Light, 2010, a documentary by Patricio Guzmán.

Debuted as part of the official selection at the Cannes Film Festival. Went on to appear at the Toronto International Film Festival, San Francisco International Film Festival, Miami International Film Festival and Melbourne International Film Festival. Won European Film Award for Best Documentary, Los Angeles Latino International Film Festival (2011) won Jury Award for Best Documentary. Winner Best Documentary, 2010 Abu Dhabi Film Festival

- Bonsai, 2011, directed by Cristián Jiménez, based on Alejandro Zambra's book of the same name.

Premiered at the Un Certain Regard section at the 2011 Cannes Film Festival. and was nominated for the Un Certain Regard Award. Won the FIPRESCI Prize - Best Film at the Havana Film Festival. Won the Grand Jury Prize - Knight Ibero-American Competition at the Jordan Alexander Kressler Screenwriting Award at the Miami Film Festival. Nominated for the Horizons Award at the San Sebastián International Film Festival.

- Violeta Went to Heaven, 2012, directed by Andrés Wood.

Won the World Cinema Jury Prize: Dramatic at the Sundance Film Festival. Nominated for the Silver Ariel - Best Latin-American Film (Mejor Película Iberoamericana) at the Ariel Awards. Nominated for the Silver Condor - Best Foreign Film and Best Spanish Language Film (Mejor Película Iberoamericana) at the Argentine Film Critics Association Film Awards. Nominated for the Grand Prize - Best Music at the Grande Prêmio do Cinema Brasileiro. Won the FIPRESCI Prize - Best Film and the Mayahuel Award - Best Actress at the Guadalajara International Film Festival. Nominated for the Art Cinema Award at the Hamburg Film Festival. Won the Grand Coral - Second Prize - Best Film at the Havana Film Festival. Nominated for the Grand Jury Prize and received a Special Mention in the Miami Film Festival. Nominated for the Films from the South Award - Best Feature, at the Oslo Films from the South Festival Nominated as Best Iberoamerican Film at the Goya Awards. Represented Chile at 84th Academy Awards for Best Foreign Language Film. Selected as the Chilean entry for the Best Foreign Language Film at the 84th Academy Awards but did not make the final shortlist

- Young and Wild, 2012, directed by Marialy Rivas.

Won a World Cinema Screenwriting Award at the Sundance Film Festival in 2012 Alicia Rodríguez won the Colón de Plata award - Best Actress at the Huelva Latin American Film Festival and Marially Rivas was nominated for the Grand Jury Prize - World Cinema - Dramatic Won the Sebastiane Award and was nominated for the Horizons Award at San Sebastián International Film Festival.

- Crystal Fairy & the Magical Cactus, 2012, directed by Sebastián Silva.

Won the Directing Award (World Cinema Dramatic) at Sundance 2013, and was also nominated for the World Cinema - Dramatic award in the Grand Jury Prize. Nominated for two Film Independent Spirit Awards, the John Cassavetes Award, and the Independent Spirit Award in 2013.

- No, 2012, directed by Pablo Larraín.

In 2013, became the first Chilean movie to be nominated for Best Foreign Picture at the Academy Awards. Nominated for Best Iberoamerican Movie at the Ariel Awards. Won Best Fictional Film - Premio Coral at the Havana Film Festival Won the Art Cinema Directors' Fortnight Award at the 2012 Cannes Film Festival. Won Best Foreign Film at the Georgia Film Critics Association in 2014. Nominated for the Art Cinema Award at the Hamburg Film Festival. Nominated for the BFI London Film Festival awards in 2012. Won an NBR Award at the National Board of Review. Nominated for the SDFCS Award at the San Diego Film Critics Society. Won Best Foreign Feature Film - Audience Award at the 2012 São Paulo International Film Festival Won the Audience Award at the Thessaloniki International Film Festival.

- Gloria, 2013, directed by Sebastián Lelio.

Won the Films in Progress Award - Best Film at the 2012 San Sebastian International Film Festival, before its official release. In 2013: Won the Guild of German Art House Cinemas Prize, the Ecumenical Jury Prize, and the Silver Berlin Bear (for Paulina García) at the 63rd Berlin International Film Festival, where it was also nominated for the Golden Bear. Won Best Film at the Mumbai International Film Festival. Won the Silver Ariel - Best Latin-American Film at the Ariel Awards. In 2014: Nominated for the Best Spanish Language Foreign Film at the 28th Goya Awards . Nominated for Best Actress (for Paulina García) and Best Film - EuroCinema Hawaii Award at the Hawaii International Film Festival. Nominated for Best Foreign Film in the Independent Spirit Awards. Won Best Foreign Language Film at the London Film Critics' Circle. Won the Top Foreign Film Award in the National Board of Review Awards 2013. Won the NBR Award at the National Board of Review, USA. Won a Cine Latino Award - Special Mention and was nominated for the Cine Latino Award and the FIPRESCI Prize at the Palm Springs International Film Festival. Won three Platino awards - Best Film, Best Actress and Best Screenplay - and was nominated for Best Director.

- Nahuel and the Magic Book, 2020, directed by Germán Acuña Delgadillo

Won the Award of Excellence in Tokyo Anime Award Festival and Best Animated Feature in Chilemonos In 2020: Nominated in Annecy International Animation Film Festival Nominated in SCHLINGEL; In 2021: Nominated in NYICFF Nominated in TAAFI Nominated in Stockholm Children's Film Festival Nominated in Premios Quirino - Best Animation, Best Original Sound and Music, Best Character Designs and Best Animated Feature

- To Kill a Man (2014)
- Bear Story (2014)
- The Club (2015)
- El botón de nácar (2015)
- Rara (2016)
- Mala junta (2016)
- Neruda (2016)
- A Fantastic Woman (2017)
- The Dogs (2017)
- Too Late to Die Young (2018)
- And Suddenly the Dawn (2018)
- The Prince (2019)
- Ema (2019)
- Jailbreak Pact (2020)
- My Tender Matador (2020)
- Nobody Knows I'm Here (2020)
- Immersion (2021)
- Blanquita (2022)
- 1976 (2022)
- The Settlers (2023)
- El Conde (2023)
- Prison in the Andes (2023)
- In Her Place (2024)

== Well-known directors ==
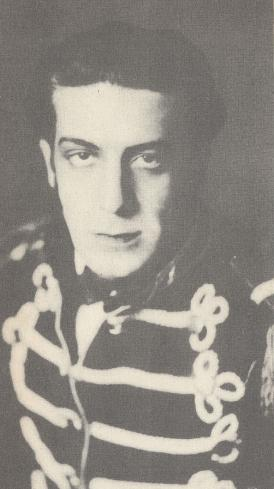
Pedro Sienna

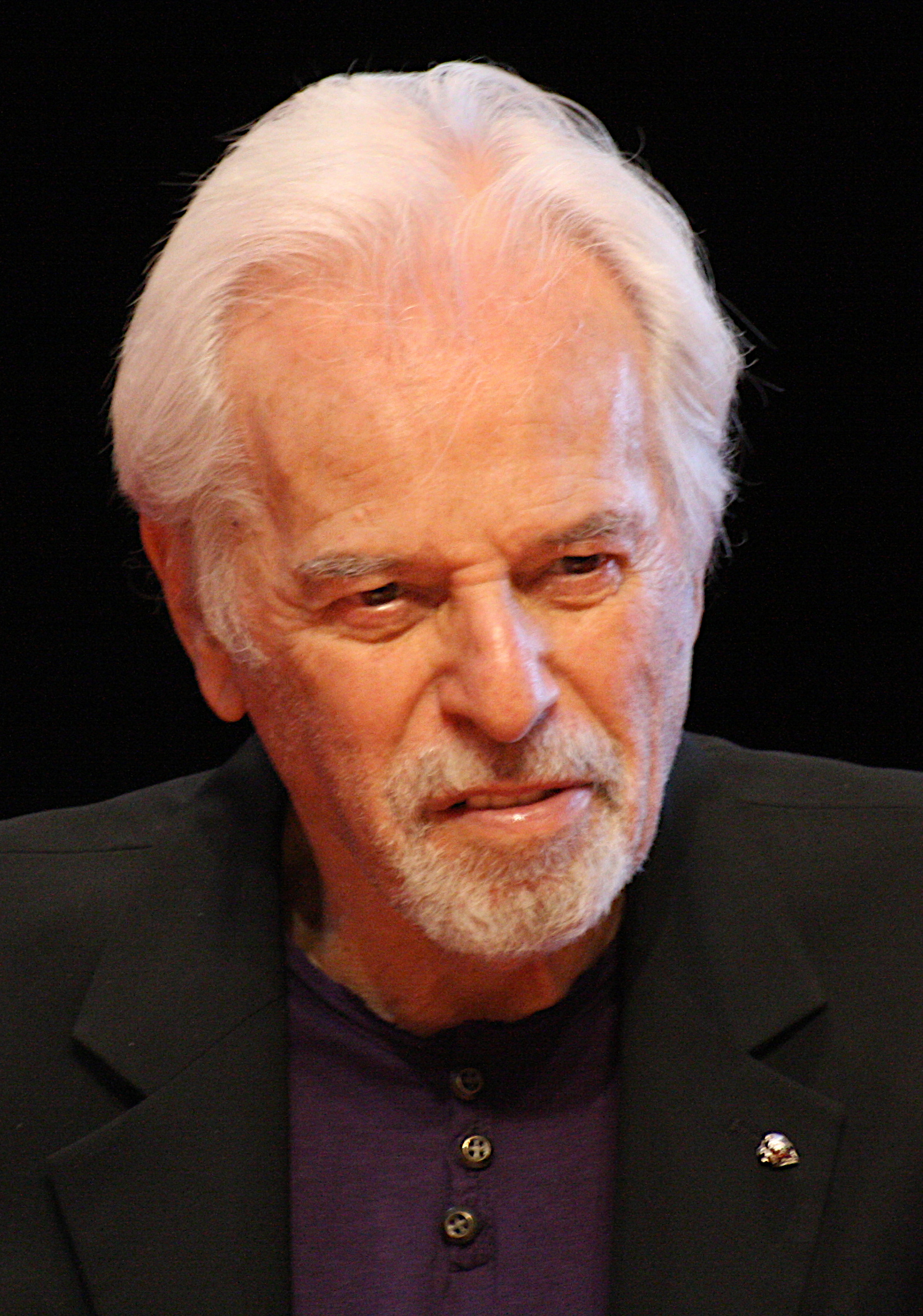
Alejandro Jodorowsky

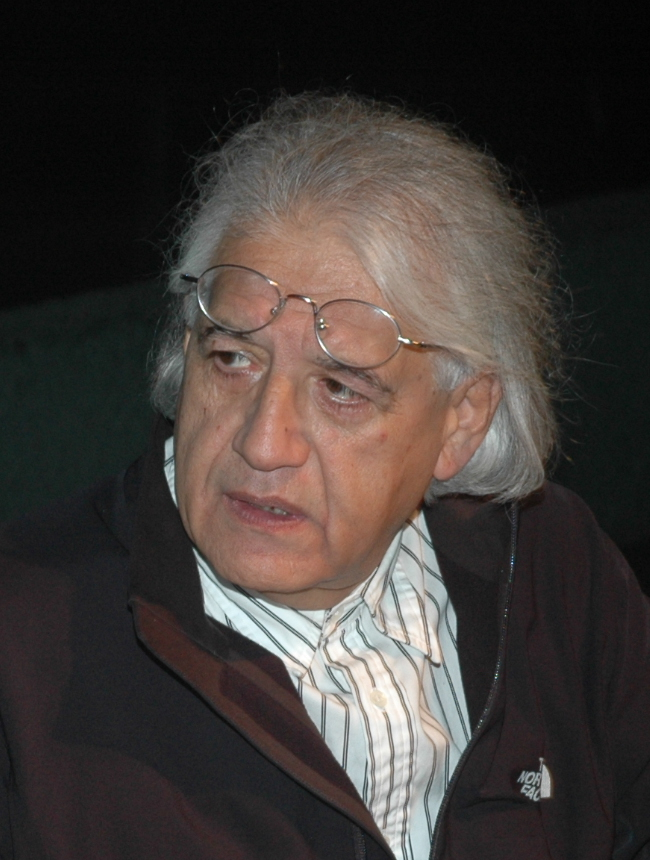
Patricio Guzmán

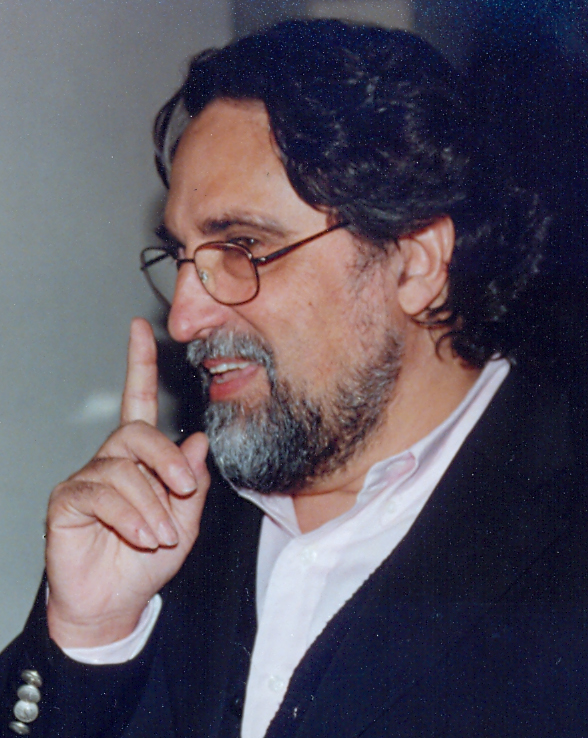
Silvio Caiozzi

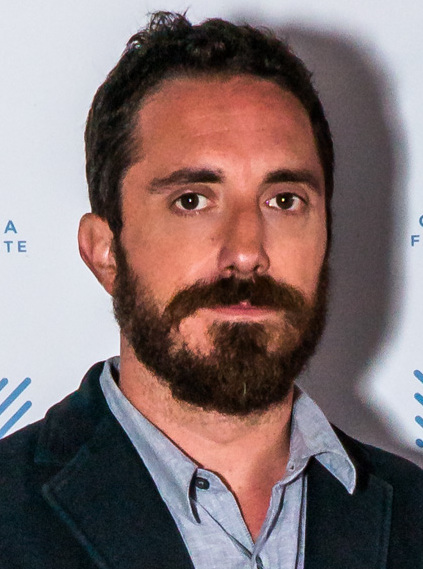
Pablo Larraín

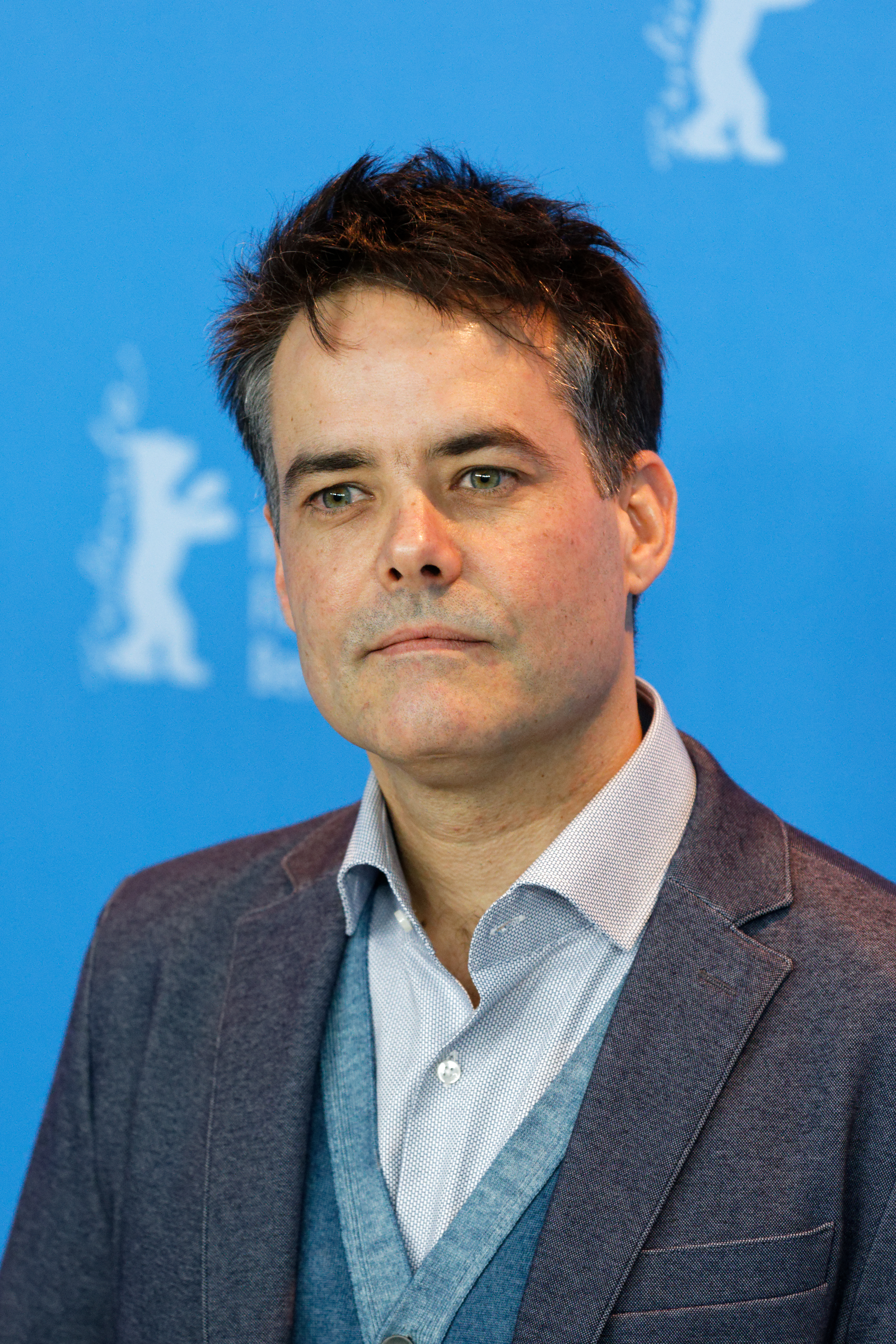
Sebastián Lelio

- Pedro Sienna
- Carlos Borcosque
- Jorge Délano
- Eugenio de Liguoro
- José Bohr
- Tito Davison
- Miguel Frank
- Naum Kramarenco
- Alejandro Jodorowsky
- Patricio Kaulen
- Pedro Chaskel
- Sergio Bravo
- Aldo Francia
- Helvio Soto
- Claudio Guzmán
- Carlos Flores del Pino
- Rolando Klein
- Alvaro Covacevich
- Patricio Guzmán
- Miguel Littín
- Raúl Ruiz
- Valeria Sarmiento
- Pablo Perelmann
- Silvio Caiozzi
- Orlando Lübbert
- Sebastián Alarcón
- Ignacio Agüero
- Cristián Sánchez
- Gonzalo Justiniano
- Sergio Castilla
- Carmen Castillo
- Andrés Wood
- Cristian Galaz
- Boris Quercia
- Alberto Fuguet
- Alexander Witt
- Carmen Luz Parot
- Alejandro Fernández Almendras
- Jorge Olguín
- Alicia Scherson
- Sebastián Sepúlveda
- Alejandro Amenábar
- Marcela Said
- José Luis Torres Leiva
- Cristián Jiménez
- Matias Lira
- Pablo Larraín
- Marialy Rivas
- Sebastián Lelio
- Ernesto Díaz Espinoza
- Matías Bize
- Sebastián Silva
- Patricio Valladares
- Nicolás López
- Maite Alberdi
- Dominga Sotomayor Castillo
- German Acuna
- Francisca Alegría

== Well-known actresses ==
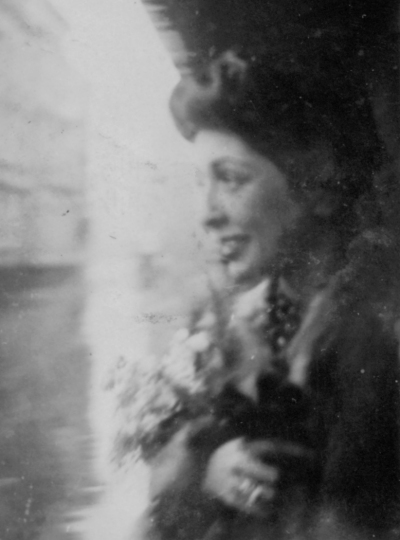
Rosita Serrano (1941)

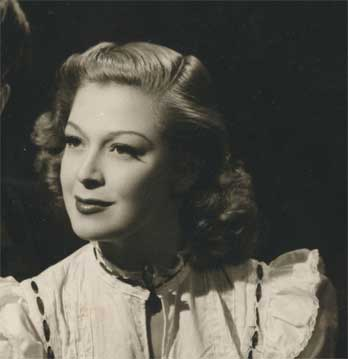
Malú Gatica

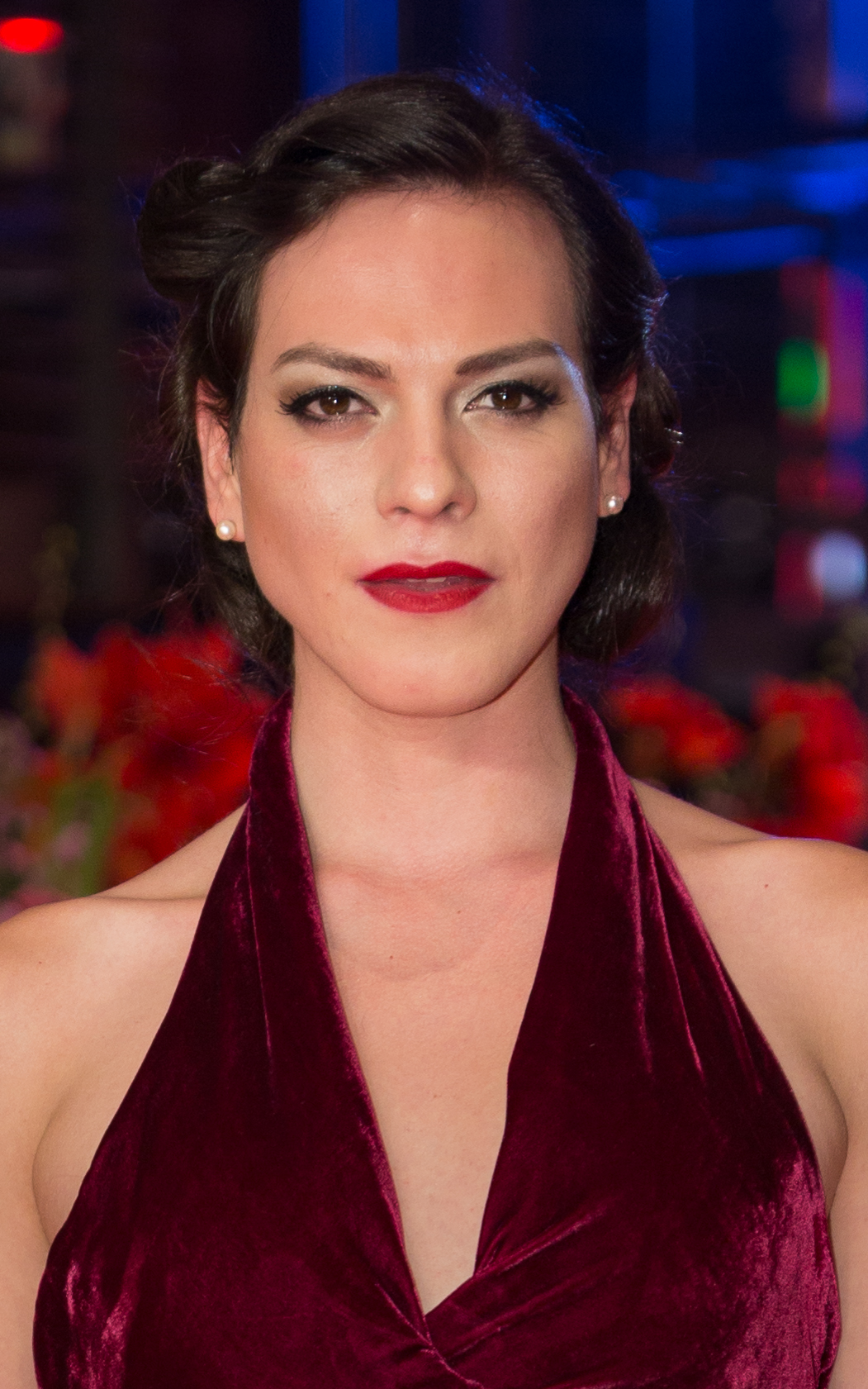
Daniela Vega

- Rosita Serrano
- Hilda Sour
- Ana González Olea
- Bélgica Castro
- Malú Gatica
- Delfina Guzmán
- Shenda Román
- Chela Bon
- Myriam Palacios
- Gloria Münchmeyer
- María Elena Duvauchelle
- Claudia Di Girólamo
- Paulina García
- Valentina Vargas
- Amparo Noguera
- Marcela Osorio
- Catalina Saavedra
- Tamara Acosta
- Antonia Zegers
- Leonor Varela
- Antonella Ríos
- Blanca Lewin
- Paz Bascuñán
- Cote de Pablo
- Paola Lattus
- Fernanda Urrejola
- Manuela Martelli
- Daniela Vega
- Lorenza Izzo

== Well-known male actors ==
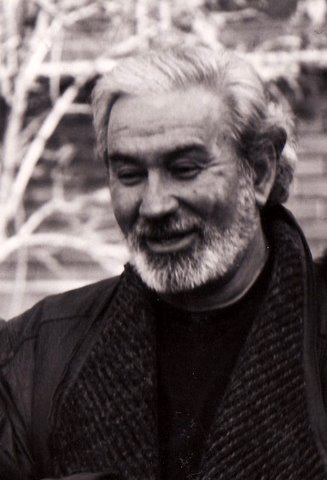
Nelson Villagra

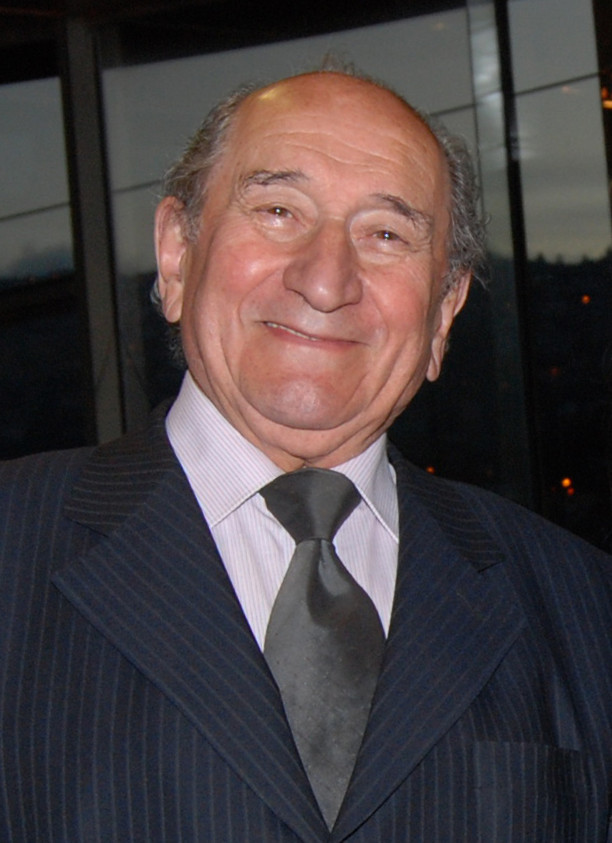
Luis Alarcón

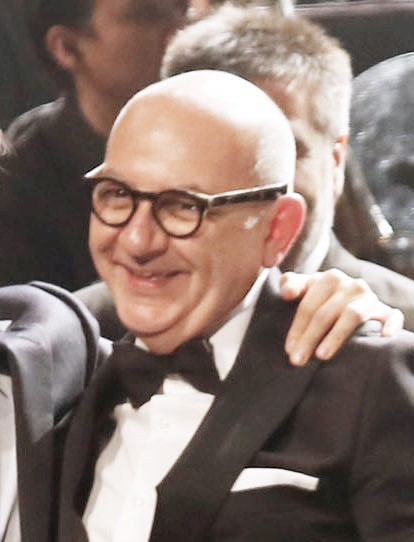
Luis Gnecco

- Eugenio Retes
- Enrique Riveros
- Roberto Parada
- Antonio Prieto
- Humberto Duvauchelle
- Luis Alarcón
- Héctor Duvauchelle
- Jaime Vadell
- Héctor Noguera
- Nelson Villagra
- Julio Jung
- Sergio Hernández
- Francisco Reyes
- Alejandro Trejo
- Alfredo Castro
- Alejandro Goic
- Luis Gnecco
- Álvaro Rudolphy
- Daniel Muñoz
- Santiago Cabrera
- Pedro Pascal
- Cristián de la Fuente
- Marko Zaror
- Pablo Schwarz
- Néstor Cantillana
- Benjamín Vicuña

== Major films ==
=== Fiction films ===
==== Before 1960 ====
- El húsar de la muerte (1925)
- Dama de la muerte (1946)
- Si mis campos hablaran (1947)
- Río abajo (1950)
- Uno que ha sido marino (1951)
- El gran circo Chamorro (1955)

==== 1960s ====
- El cuerpo y la sangre (1962)
- Regreso al silencio (1967)
- Largo viaje (1967)
- Ayúdeme usted compadre (1968)
- Tres tristes tigres (1968) shared Golden Leopard at the Locarno Festival
- Valparaíso mi amor (1969)
- Caliche sangriento (1969)
- El chacal de Nahueltoro (1969)

==== 1970s ====
- Los testigos (1971)
- Palomita blanca (1973)
- La tierra prometida (1973)
- A la sombra del sol (1974)
- Diálogos de exiliados (1975)
- Julio comienza en julio (1979)
- El zapato chino (1979)

==== 1980s ====
- Los deseos concebidos (1982)
- Ardiente paciencia (1983)
- Sussi (1988)
- Imagen latente (1988)

==== 1990s ====
- Caluga o menta (1990)
- La luna en el espejo (1990) won Volpi Cup for Best Actress at the Venice Film Festival
- La frontera (1991) won Silver Bear for outstanding single achievement at the 42nd Berlin International Film Festival
- Johnny cien pesos (1993)
- Amnesia (1994)
- Los náufragos (1994)
- Historias de fútbol (1997)
- Gringuito (1998)
- El Chacotero Sentimental (1999)

==== 2000s ====
- Ángel negro (2000)
- Bastardos en el paraíso (2000)
- Tierra del Fuego (2000)
- La fiebre del loco (2001)
- Negocio redondo (2001)
- Taxi para tres (2001) won Golden Shell at the San Sebastián International Film Festival
- Te amo (Made in Chile) (2001)
- Ogú y Mampato en Rapa Nui (2002)
- Sangre eterna (2002)
- Sexo con amor (2002)
- B-Happy (2003)
- Coronación (2003)
- Los debutantes (2003)
- Sábado, una película en tiempo real (2003)
- Sub Terra (2003)
- Cachimba (2004)
- Machuca (2004)
- Mala leche (2004)
- Promedio rojo (2004)
- Días de campo (2005)
- Padre nuestro (2005)
- En la cama (2005)
- Mi mejor enemigo (2005)
- Paréntesis (2005)
- Play (2005)
- Se arrienda (2005)
- El rey de los huevones (2006)
- Kiltro (2006)
- La sagrada familia (2006)
- El pejesapo (2007)
- Radio Corazón (2007)
- Tony Manero (2008)
- El cielo, la tierra y la lluvia (2008)
- 31 minutos, la película (2008)
- La buena vida (2008)
- La nana (2009)
- Dawson Isla 10 (2009)
- Huacho (2009)

==== 2010s ====
- La vida de los peces (2010)
- Gatos viejos (2010)
- Fuck My Life (2010), Qué pena tu boda (2011) and Qué pena tu familia (2013)
- Post Mortem (2010)
- Violeta se fue a los cielos (2011)
- Bonsái (2011)
- The Year of the Tiger (2011)
- Joven y alocada (2012)
- No (2012) nominated for Academy Award for Best Foreign Language Film
- La noche de enfrente (2012)
- De jueves a domingo (2012)
- Carne de perro (2012)
- Crystal Fairy (2012)
- Stefan v/s Kramer (2012) and Ciudadano Kramer (2013)
- Las cosas como son (2012)
- Magic Magic (2013)
- Gloria (2013) won Silver Bear for Best Actress at the Berlin International Film Festival
- La danza de la realidad (2013)
- Crystal Fairy & the Magical Cactus (2013)
- El futuro (2013)
- El verano de los peces voladores (2013)
- Cirqo (2013)
- Las analfabetas (2013)
- Las niñas Quispe (2013)
- Aurora (2014)
- Matar a un hombre (2014)
- Allende en su laberinto (2014)
- Neruda (2014)
- No soy Lorena (2014)
- The Guest (La Visita) (2014)
- Historia de un oso (2014) won Academy Award for Best Animated Short Film
- El bosque de Karadima (2015)
- En la gama de los grises (2015)
- El Club (2015)
- Poesía sin fin (2016)
- El Cristo ciego (2016)
- Rara (2016) won Jury Prize at the Berlin International Film Festival
- Mala junta (2016)
- Sin filtro (2016)
- Neruda (2016)
- Nunca vas a estar solo (2016)
- Much Ado About Nothing (2016)
- Una mujer fantástica (2017) won Academy Award for Best Foreign Language Film
- Johnny 100 pesos, capítulo dos (2017)
- Cabros de mierda (2017)
- Niñas araña (2017)
- Y de pronto el amanecer (2017)
- Los perros (2017)
- No estoy loca (2018)
- Tarde para morir joven (2018) won Leopard for Best Direction at the Locarno Festival
- La salamandra (2018)
- Mi amigo Alexis (2019)
- El príncipe (2019)
- Araña (2019)
- Ema (2019)
- Perro bomba (2019)
- Some Beasts (2019)
- Ella es Cristina (2019)
- Blanco en blanco (2019)

==== 2020s ====
- Jailbreak Pact (2020)
- My Tender Matador (2020)
- Nahuel and the Magic Book (2020)
- Nobody Knows I'm Here (2020)
- Piola (2020)
- La Verónica (2021)
- La mirada incendiada (2021)
- Un loco matrimonio en cuarentena (2021)
- Immersion (2021)
- Blanquita (2022)
- The Cow Who Sang a Song Into the Future (2022)
- The Punishment (2022)
- Analogues (2023)
- The Movie Teller (2023)
- History and Geography (2023)
- The Settlers (2023)
- El Conde (2023)
- El vacío (2023)
- Prison in the Andes (2023)
- In Her Place (2024)
- El Fantasma (2024)
- A Yard of Jackals (2024)
- Isla Negra (2024)
- Designation of Origin (2024)
- ¿Cuándo te vas? (2025)
- The Mysterious Gaze of the Flamingo (2025)
- The Dog Thief (2025)
- The Wave (2025)
- You Broke my Heart (2025)
- La fuente (2025)
- Matapanki (2025)
- Kalkutún, juicio a los brujos (2026)
- Mil pedazos (2026)
- The Red Hangar (2026)
- The Meltdown (2026)

=== Documentaries ===
- Mimbre (1957)
- Día de organillos (1959)
- Morir un poco (1966)
- La batalla de Chile (1979)
- Acta General de Chile (1986)
- Cien niños esperando un tren (1988)
- La flaca Alejandra (1994)
- Aquí se construye (o Ya no existe el lugar donde nací) (2000)
- Un hombre aparte (2001)
- Estadio Nacional (2001)
- Cofralandes, rapsodia chilena (2002)
- La cueca sola (2003)
- Salvador Allende (2004)
- Calle Santa Fe (2007)
- El diario de Agustín (2008)
- Nostalgia de la luz (2010)
- El salvavidas (2011)
- La once (2014)
- El botón de nácar (2015) won Silver Bear for Best Screenplay at the Berlin International Film Festival
- Lemebel (2019)
- The Cordillera of Dreams (2019)
- The Mole Agent (2020)
- My Imaginary Country (2022)
- The Eternal Memory (2023)
- Oasis (2024)
- La ruta infinita (2025)

== Cinema Festivals in Chile ==
Among the best known Chilean cinema festivals are:

- Festival Internacional de Animacion Chilemonos - CHILEMONOS (Chilemonos International Animation Film Festival)

A festival with only five editions by 2014, it brings together most Chilean animation producers as well as many fans.

- Festival Internacional de Documentales de Antofagasta - ANTOFADOCS (Antofagasta International Documentary Festival)

A documentary film festival held in the Atacama Desert in the northern Chilean city of Antofagasta. ATOFADOCS offers free workshops that are open to the community.

- Festival Internacional de Cine de la Antártica sobre Medio Ambiente y Sustentabilidad - FICAMS (Antarctica International Film Festival on Environment and Sustainability).

FICAMS is a green film festival which invites filmmakers of all nationalities to enter audiovisual works that address global warming, renewable energy, the environment and sustainability issues. This festival began in 2011, and is held in Punta Arenas and Puerto Williams, two of the southernmost cities in Chile and the world.

- Festival de Cine B - CINE B (B Cinema Festival)

Cine B festival is accepts all kinds of independent works, including feature films, shorts, music videos and other non-traditional formats. In general, in features films rejected by big movie theatres and distributors. The festival began in 2008 and is organized by the Chilean Film School and other organizations that have joined over the years.

- Festival de Cine de Mujeres - FEMCINE (Women's Film Festival)

FEMCINE is the response to the lack of women in film production, as stated on the festival's website by its executive director Antonella Estévez: "less than 20% of the TV or cinema productions we see are directed by a woman".

- Festival Internacional de Cine Valdivia FICV - (Valdivia International Film Festival)

Valdivia International Film Festival is an international film exhibition that includes other cultural events like free concerts and book releases. The festival begun in 1993 to celebrate the 30th anniversary of the Universidad Austral de Chile's Cine Club.

- Festival Internacional de Cine de Viña del Mar - FICVIÑA (Viña del Mar International Film Festival)

Although the Viña del Mar International Film Festival started in 1967, its history goes back to 1963, with the first Amateur Film Festival promoted by doctor and filmmaker Aldo Francia. In its fourth edition in 1966, the festival dropped the "amateur" from the title and became the first Chilean international film festival. Eventually the festival evolved to become what we know today.

- Festival Internacional de Cine de Lebu- FICIL BIOBIO (Lebu International Film Festival)

Originally known as the Festival de Cine Latinoamericano Caverna Benavides de Lebu, the festival was created to incentivize film culture in Lebu, Arauco Province which by then had few cinemas and a population that knew very little about cinema. Initially, it focused on Latin American cinema before growing into the international festival that it is today.

- Festival Internacional de Documentales de Santiago - FIDOCS (Santiago International Documentary Film Festival)

Started in 1997, FIDOCS has become the main space for the exchange, circulation and competition of the documentary genre in Chile.

- Festival del Cine Social y Antisocial de La Pintana - FECISO (La Pintana Social and Antisocial Film Festival)

In 2007, La Pintana Social and Antisocial Film Festival was created with the purpose of promoting and disseminating works that address social issues. The festival brought together a wide range of social organizations and promoted the debate of social issues. La Pintana is one of the most deprived communes of Chile.

- Santiago Festival Internacional de Cine - SANFIC (Santiago International Film Festival)

As its name suggests, the festival takes place in Santiago and, along with the festival held in Valdivia, has become one of the most important Chilean film festivals.

- Festival de Cine Documental de Chiloé - FEDOCHI (Chiloé Documentary Film Festival)

This festival has taken place in Chiloé in southern Chile every year since 2006, and is focused on audiovisual works about heritage, identity and the rescuing of memory.

== See also ==
- Cinema of the world
- List of Chilean films
- Latin American cinema
- List of Chilean actors
- List of Chilean telenovelas
