= Carmen Brito =

Chilean filmmaker, restorer, and editor

- Born: Carmen Brito Alvarado; 4 August 1947 (age 79); Santiago, Chile
- Education: Pontifical Catholic University of Chile
- Occupations: Filmmaker, editor, and restorer
- Awards: Pedro Sienna Award (2013)

Carmen Brito Alvarado (born 4 August 1947) is a Chilean filmmaker, restorer, and editor. She is best known for rescuing important works of Chilean cinema.

== Career ==
Brito studied at the Film Institute of the Pontifical Catholic University of Chile from 1966 to 1970, specializing later in editing techniques at the School of Arts and Communication of this same house of studies, dedicating herself to work as an editor there from 1970 to 1980.

In 1981, she was hired by Chilefilms to carry out editing work, cut negatives, and archive until 1990. At the same time, she dedicated herself to the production of a variety of documentaries and the synchronization and assembly of feature films. In addition, she has worked in the post-production and editing of institutional documentaries, television commercials, and other projects.

Brito has also taught audiovisual communication at Duoc UC, and assembly, negative cutting, and post-production at ARCIS University.

In 2013 she received the Pedro Sienna Award for her distinguished career, as well as the FemCine Award.

== Filmography ==
=== As editor ===
- Sin título (short documentary, 1974)
- Vías paralelas (fiction feature, 1975)
- Hacia una isla desconocida (documentary, 1983)
- Caluga o menta (fiction feature, 1990)
- The Frontier (fiction feature, 1991)
- Ciudad Lejos (fiction short, 1996)
- El último cierra la puerta (fiction short, 1996)
- Coronation (fiction feature, 2000)
- No hay tierra sin dueño (fiction feature, 2003)
- Eme como Mistral (fiction short, 2010)
- Buscando Isla de Pascua, la película perdida (documentary, 2014)
- Mocha Dick, la ballena mapuche (documentary, 2016)

=== Restorations ===
- La Dama de las Camelias (José Bohr, 1947)
- Three Sad Tigers (Raúl Ruíz, 1968)
- Canta y no llores corazón (Juan Pérez Berrocal, 1925)
- Valparaíso, mi amor (Aldo Francia, 1969)
- Bajo la cruz del sur (Antonio Berchenko and Alberto Santana, 1947)
- El Húsar de la Muerte (Pedro Sienna, 1925. Restoration from 1995)
