= Jackal of Nahueltoro (film) =

1969 film

- Chilean DVD cover
- Directed by: Miguel Littín
- Written by: Miguel Littín
- Produced by: Luis Cornejo; Luis Alcarón
- Starring: Nelson Villagra
- Cinematography: Héctor Ríos
- Edited by: Pedro Chaskel
- Release date: June 1969
- Running time: 95 minutes
- Country: Chile
- Language: Spanish

Jackal of Nahueltoro (Spanish: El Chacal de Nahueltoro) is a 1969 Chilean drama film directed by Miguel Littín, based on the true story of Jorge Valenzuela Torres, a poor farmer who, during a drunken rampage in 1960, murdered his partner and five of her children.

The film questions the morality of the death penalty and societal complicity in Torres's crime. It received critical acclaim on release and remains well regarded in the history of Chilean cinema.

== Plot ==
Jorge del Carmen Valenzuela Torres is a farmer who suffers from abuse and exploitation from childhood, leading to alcoholism. As an adult, he receives help from a poor woman named Rosa Rivas, who has five children from a previous marriage. Eventually, he marries her. However, in August 1960, while under the influence of alcohol, he gets into a fight with her and ends up murdering her and all of her children. He is arrested the following month and spends 32 months in prison, during which he learns to read and write and converts to Catholicism. He is ultimately sentenced to execution by firing squad, which is carried out in 1963.

== Cast ==
- Nelson Villagra as Jorge Valenzuela
- Shenda Román as Rosa Rivas
- Héctor Noguera as Chaplain
- Luis Alarcón as the Judge
- Rafael Benavente as a prison guard
- Roberto Navarrete
- Marcelo Romo as Reporter
- Rubén Sotoconil as Corporal Campos
- Pedro Villagra

== Production ==
A meeting at the first Viña del Mar International Film Festival in 1967 brought Littín together with other emerging filmmakers. Led by Aldo Francia, they formed a movement known as New Chilean Cinema. Jackal of Nahueltoro takes a documentary, nonlinear approach. It emphasizes that Valenzuela has "no discernible motive".

== Reception ==
Jackal of Nahueltoro served as a leftist critique of centrist Christian Democrat rule in Chile by highlighting society's role in the crime. It mobilized Salvador Allende's supporters in the 1970 Chilean presidential election and was seen by an estimated 500,000 people. It was named the best documentary at the 1969 Viña del Mar festival, won the OCIC prize at the 20th Berlin International Film Festival in 1970, and appeared at the Melbourne International Film Festival in 1971.

Alongside Francia's Valparaíso mi amor and Helvio Soto's Caliche sangriento, Jackal of Nahueltoro proved influential in the history of Chilean cinema. A 2016 poll named it the greatest Chilean film of all time. The Brooklyn Rail described it as "one of the most famous South American films of the latter half of the 20th century" in a review of Gabriel García Márquez's Clandestine in Chile, which tells of Littín's exile after Allende's overthrow.

== Bibliography ==
- Donoso, Catalina (July 2010). "¿Espectador en acción?: representación e identificación del pueblo/masa en El Chacal de Nahueltoro" [Spectator in action? Representation and identification of the village in El Chacal de Nahueltoro]. Aisthesis (47): 100–114. doi:10.4067/S0718-71812010000100007. ISSN 0718-7181.
- Hart, Stephen M. (2004). A companion to Latin American film. Rochester, NY: Tamesis. ISBN 1855661063.
- King, John (2000). Magical reels: a history of cinema in Latin America. London: Verso. ISBN 9781859842331.
