= Shenda Román =

Chilean actress (born 1928)

- Born: 4 August 1928 (age 97); Tacna
- Occupation: Actress

Shenda Román (born 4 August 1928) is a Chilean actress best known for playing leading roles opposite Nelson Villagra in the New Chilean Cinema (1968–1973) of directors Raúl Ruiz and Miguel Littín.

== Selected filmography ==
- Three Sad Tigers (1968)
- Jackal of Nahueltoro (1969)
- Nobody Said Anything (1971)
- The Promised Land (1973)
- Cantata de Chile (1976)
- Presencia lejana (1982)
- Voice Over (2014)
- The Mother of the Lamb (2014)
