= The Penal Colony =

The Penal Colony may refer to:

- The Penal Colony: Stories and Short Pieces, a collection of short stories and recollections by Franz Kafka
- The Penal Colony (film), a 1970 Chilean drama film

== See also ==
- "In the Penal Colony", a short story by Franz Kafka
- Penal colony, a settlement used to exile prisoners
- Penal Colony (band), an American electro-industrial group
