= Luis Alarcón =

Chilean actor (1929–2023)

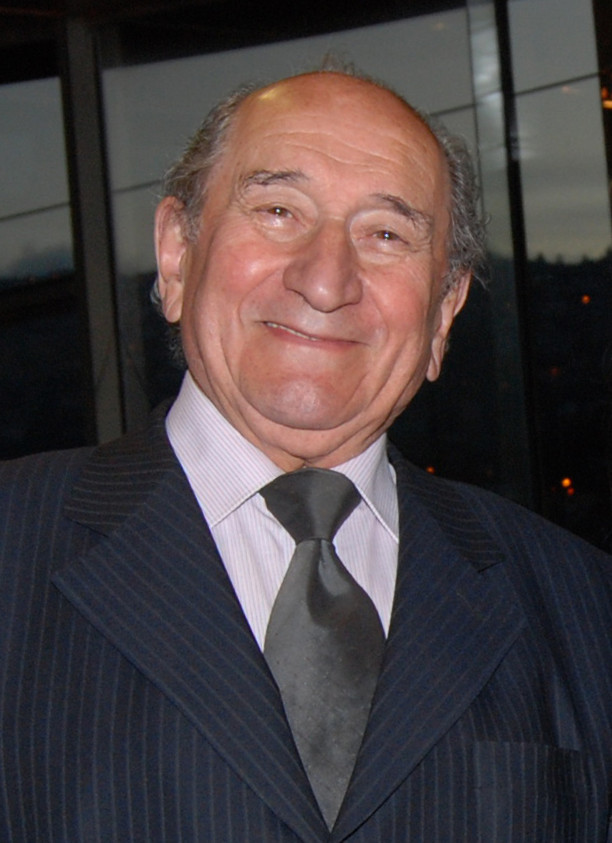
- Born: Luis Alfonso Alarcón Mansilla; 23 October 1929; Puerto Natales, Chile
- Died: 4 August 2023 (aged 93); Santiago, Chile
- Other name: Lucho Alarcón
- Education: University of Chile
- Occupations: Actor, theater director
- Years active: 1951–2023
- Spouses: Marion Soto; Lucía Eitel (until 2012)
- Awards: Golden Lion of the Cannes Film Festival (1986); Altazor Award (2000); Pablo Neruda Order of Artistic and Cultural Merit (2007)

Luis Alfonso Alarcón Mansilla (23 October 1929 – 4 August 2023), popularly known as Lucho Alarcón, was a Chilean actor, theatre director, and activist with a distinguished film, television, and stage career.

In 1957, Alarcón began working as a stage actor participating in university theaters – University of Chile, Catholic, Concepción, State Technical – and in independent companies. He later began his career as a cinematic actor, appearing in emblematic films such as Three Sad Tigers, Jackal of Nahueltoro, The Expropriation, Julio comienza en julio, Nadie dijo nada, Little White Dove, Caluga o menta, and The Shipwrecked.

In the 1980s he had roles in several telenovelas, but gained attention in the press only in 1983 when he played the evil Roberto Betancourt in La represa. In 1993, he was instrumental in the creation of ChileActores, of which he would become the founding President. Alarcón was labeled the "Sabatini Star Actor", referring to his many appearances in the spectacular productions of Vicente Sabatini on television, which were very successful due to their social content. In 1999, he co-starred in the telenovela La fiera, starring actress Claudia di Girolamo, which became a praised and awarded soap opera. From 1995 to 2008 he was part of the stable cast of Sabatini. Through the producer's success, Alarcón continued to work with important figures in cinema, theater, and television.

Alarcón also appeared in television series such as Marta a las ocho, Estúpido Cupido, Romané, La noche del cobarde, Marrón Glacé, Puertas adentro, Pampa Ilusión, El circo de las Montini, and El Señor de la Querencia.

Alarcón was the creator of the Patagonia Film Festival, a gala developed in the Cueva del Milodón. Currently he is officially recognized as the actor with the longest career in Chilean cinema, occasionally collaborating with Raúl Ruiz, Helvio Soto, Miguel Littín, Emilio Gómez Muriel, and Silvio Caiozzi.

== Life and career ==
The grandson of actor and director Justo Alarcón, Luis loved the art of film from a very young age. In Puerto Natales, where he was born, he became friends with the daughter of the cinema administrator, and there he learned the trade. In addition, his father – who worked in a refrigerator – was an amateur documentary filmmaker.

There is no other performer in Chilean cinema who appeared, like Alarcón, in such a large number of films. His origins as an actor, however, were in the theater, an activity that officially began (he had previously acted in school functions) in 1951, and he subsequently acted in around 90 theatrical pieces. He related that his vocation was defined after attending an exhibition of Death of a Salesman, by Arthur Miller. He studied Corporal Expression and Pantomime with Alejandro Jodorowsky, and with Enrique Gajardo and Pedro de la Barra at the Dramatic Arts Center of the Pedagogical Institute of the University of Chile, among others.

His first foray onto the big screen was made in the 1957 film Tres miradas a la calle by Naum Kramarenco. Pedro Chaskel, who worked as assistant director on the film, would some years later become the director of Experimental Cinema at the University of Chile.

Alarcón participated in Luis Cornejo's first film, La Universidad en la Antarctica (1962), which he narrated. Later, along with much of his theater company, he starred in Raúl Ruiz's first feature film El tango del viudo (1967). Rather than ending, the shoot led directly into the making of Three Sad Tigers (1968), considered one of the most important films of Chilean cinema.

That same year he was summoned to join the experimental film team of the University of Chile, which produced his first feature film project called Jackal of Nahueltoro, based on real events in the San Carlos region, where an illiterate murders a whole family and later, after being educated in prison, is condemned to death. Alarcón would initially play a journalist, but he then became involved in the production of the film with Luis Cornejo himself. Jackal of Nahueltoro broke public attendance records, only surpassed by the television hit adapted to the big screen, Germán Becker's Ayúdeme usted compadre.

Later, Luis Alarcón appeared in a large portion of Raúl Ruiz's films such as Nadie dijo nada (1970), The Penal Colony (1970), The Expropriation (1971), and Little White Dove (1973).

On television he has played emblematic characters on TVN's Dramatic Area series, such as Pedro Chamorro on La fiera, who at all costs wants to marry his eldest daughter, due to a promise made to his dying wife. He was also well known for his role as Roberto Betancourt on the television series La represa, a very evil and abusive landlord.

Alarcón was also known for his Indian character in advertising for the Firestone tire brand. For one such commercial, shot by director Silvio Caiozzi, Alarcón won a Golden Lion Award at the 1986 Cannes Film Festival.

In 2017, he received the Golden Spike Award from the Institute of Higher Communication Studies for his outstanding artistic career in Chilean cinema.

Luis Alarcón died on 4 August 2023, at the age of 93.

== Filmography ==
Films
Year	Title	Role	Director
1957	Tres miradas a la calle	Offender	Naum Kramarenco
1961	La Novia		Ernesto Arancibia
1962	La Flor de Irupé	Roberto	Alberto Du Bois
1967	Erase un niño, un guerrillero, un caballo		Helvio Soto
1967	El tango del viudo		Raúl Ruiz
1968	Three Sad Tigers	Luis Úbeda	Raúl Ruiz
1969	Jackal of Nahueltoro	Judge	Miguel Littín
1970	¡Qué hacer!	Osvaldo Alarcón	Raúl Ruiz
1970	The Penal Colony	Head of State	Raúl Ruiz
1970	La Buscona		Emilio Gómez Muriel
1970	Rosas blancas para mi hermana negra		Abel Salazar
1970	Flor de durazno		Emilio Gómez Muriel
1971	Jesús, el niño Dios	Voltigo	Miguel Zacarías
1971	Los testigos		Charles Elsesser
1971	Nadie dijo nada	Braulio "The Poet"	Raúl Ruiz
1971	Dos mujeres y un hombre		Alfredo B. Crevenna
1972	Hoy he soñado con Dios	Octavio	Julián Soler
1972	Doña Macabra		Roberto Gavaldón
1973	Little White Dove	Stepfather of María	Raúl Ruiz
1974	A la sombra del Sol	Carrillo	Silvio Caiozzi
1974	The Expropriation	Capataz Lucho	Raúl Ruiz
1975	Vías paralelas		Cristián Sánchez
1977	Arrecife mortal		John Randall
1979	El amor de mi vida	Gene Curtis	Joselito Rodríguez
1979	Julio comienza en julio	Alberto García del Castaño	Silvio Caiozzi
1980	El zapato chino	Félix	Cristián Sánchez
1987	Sussi	Mario	Gonzalo Justiniano
1990	Caluga o menta	Marcial	Gonzalo Justiniano
1990	Hay algo allá afuera		Pepe Maldonado
1992	Los agentes de la KGB también se enamoran	Don Pedro	Sebastián Alarcón
1993	Johnny 100 Pesos	Juez Gastón Mora	Gustavo Graef-Marino
1993	Derecho de asilo		Octavio Cortázar
1994	The Shipwrecked	Sebastián Mola	Miguel Littín
1997	La huella		Juan Diego Garreton
1998	Aventureros del fin del mundo	Adventurer	Miguel Littín
1999	Cinco marineros y un ataúd verde	Hans	Miguel Littín
1999	El duelo	Don Faustino	Miguel Littín
2000	Tierra del Fuego	Alexis	Miguel Littín
2000	Chilean Gothic		Ricardo Harrington
2002	Estación de invierno		Pamela Espinoza
2003	The Chosen One	Head of State	Nacho Argiró & Gabriel López
2004	La Isla		Alex Leyton
2006	Kiltro	Farah	Ernesto Díaz
2008	Secretos		Valeria Sarmiento
2009	Mandrill	Don Mario	Ernesto Díaz
2011	Gente mala del norte	Abelardo de la Puente	Patricio Riquelme
2013	La gravedad del púgil		Jorge Mella
2014	Mamá ya crecí	Clemente Correa	Gonzalo Badilla
2014	Maldito Amor	Señor Ossandón	Gonzalo Badilla
2014	La invención de la Patria		Galut Alarcón

== Television ==
TV series
Year	Series	Role	Channel
1966	Historia de los lunes		Chilevisión
1967	Juani en Sociedad		
1975	J. J. Juez	El Capataz	Canal 13
1981	Casagrande	Humberto Martínez	Canal 13
1982	Anakena	Mariano Balcarce	Canal 13
1982	La señora	Marcial	Canal 13
1983	La noche del cobarde	Alamiro Villarrobles	Canal 13
1984	La Represa	Roberto Betancourt	TVN
1984	La torre 10	Ramón Oyarce	TVN
1985	Marta a las ocho	René Barrientos	TVN
1985	Morir de amor	Emiliano Cardoso	TVN
1986	La dama del balcón	Domínguez	TVN
1986	La villa	Rafael López "El Coyote"	TVN
1988	Semidiós	Albino Vega	Canal 13
1989	La Intrusa	Adolfo Tropero	Canal 13
1990	El milagro de vivir	Marcial Ríos	TVN
1990	Crónica de un hombre santo	Monseñor Sergio Valech	Canal 13
1991	Volver a empezar	Gastón de la Force	TVN
1992	El palo al gato	Jaime	Canal 13
1993	Marrón Glacé	Waldo	Canal 13
1994	Champaña	Camilo Zamudio	Canal 13
1994	Rojo y miel	Alcides Mainardi	TVN
1995	Estúpido Cupido	Octavio Dublé	TVN
1996	Sucupira	Ambrosio Campos	TVN
1997	La buhardilla	José María	TVN
1997	Brigada Escorpión	Anselmo Marín	TVN
1998	Borrón y cuenta nueva	Reynaldo Paz	TVN
1998	Mi abuelo, mi nana y yo	Nicanor Barros Jarpa	TVN
1998–1999	Sucupira, la comedia	Ambrosio Campos	TVN
1999	La fiera	Pedro Chamorro "El Guata de Sandía"	TVN
2000	Romané	Baldomero Lillo / Spiro Antich	TVN
2001	Pampa Ilusión	Emilio Fuenzalida	TVN
2002	El circo de las Montini	Juan Lorenzo "El Capitán"	TVN
2003	Puertas adentro	Efraín Gallegos	TVN
2004	Los Pincheira	Padre Antonio Ortúzar	TVN
2005	Los Capo	Giorgio Capo "El Nono"	TVN
2006	Disparejas	Adolfo Duarte	TVN
2007	Corazón de María	Pedro Lamarca	TVN
2008	Viuda Alegre	Edgardo Mansilla	TVN
2008	El Señor de la Querencia	Renato Echeñique	TVN
2009	El vuelo del poeta	Vicente García-Huidobro	TVN
2010	Martin Rivas	Pedro San Luis	TVN
2010	La familia de al lado	Igor Mora	TVN
2011	Témpano	Francisco Grau	TVN
2013	Somos los Carmona	Rosendo Carmona	TVN
2014	Caleta del sol	Nicasio Mardones "Don Lobo"	TVN
2015	Los años dorados	Manuel	UCV Television
2015	El bosque de Karadima	Arzobispo	Chilevisión
2016	El camionero	Emeterio Pérez	TVN
2017	Dime quién fue	Humberto Rodríguez	TVN

== Awards and recognitions ==
- Golden Lion of the Cannes Film Festival (1986)
- Recognition of the film industry at the 7th Viña del Mar International Film Festival (1994)
- Association of Entertainment Journalists (APES) Award (1995) – Best Lead Actor for Estúpido Cupido
- APES Award (1999) – Best Lead Actor for La Fiera
- Altazor Award (2000) – Best Actor for La Fiera
- APES Award (2000) – Best Acting Career
- Relevant Contribution to National Cinema from the Ministry of Education of Chile (2001)
- Pablo Neruda Order of Artistic and Cultural Merit (2007)
- Honorific Medal of the Senate of the Republic of Chile (2008)
- Tribute for 50-year career by the Corporation of Actors of Chile (ChileActores)
- Pedro de la Barra Medal for his six decades of acting work, awarded by the University of Chile
- Honorary Acting Career Award of the Quilpué Film Festival (2010)
- Named Illustrious Son of Puerto Natales by the authorities of the city
- Pudú Prize for cinematic career at the Valdivia Film Festival
- Golden Spike Award from the Institute of Higher Communication Studies (2017)
- Lifetime Achievement Award at the Caleuche Awards (2018)
