= The Expropriation =

1974 film

- Film image
- Directed by: Raúl Ruiz
- Written by: Raúl Ruiz
- Starring: Jaime Vadell
- Cinematography: Adrian Cooper; Jorge Müller Silva
- Edited by: Valeria Sarmiento
- Release date: 1974
- Running time: 60 minutes
- Country: Chile
- Language: Spanish

The Expropriation (Spanish: La expropiación) is a 1974 Chilean drama film directed by Chilean filmmaker Raúl Ruiz.

== Cast ==
- Jaime Vadell as Agronomo Vidal
- Nemesio Antúnez as Don Nemesio
- Delfina Guzmán as Dona Delfina
- Luis Alarcón as Capataz Lucho
- Nicolas Eyzaguirre as Nicolas
- Rodrigo Maturana as Military Phantasm
- Joaquín Eyzaguirre as Joaquin
