= Un paseo a Playa Ancha =

- Directed by: Maurice Albert Massonnier
- Cinematography: Maurice Albert Massonnier
- Release date: 1903
- Running time: 2 min
- Country: Chile

Un paseo a Playa Ancha is a 1903 Chilean black and white documentary film directed by Frenchman Maurice Albert Massonnier.

It was filmed in Valparaíso on 8 December 1903 and premiered on 16 December of the same year in the Biógrafo Lumière and in the national theatre of Valparaíso. It is the oldest known surviving Chilean film with any recorded evidence, after its restoration in France in the 1990s by Daniel Sandoval.
