= Tres Álamos =

Political prison camp in Chile 1974–76

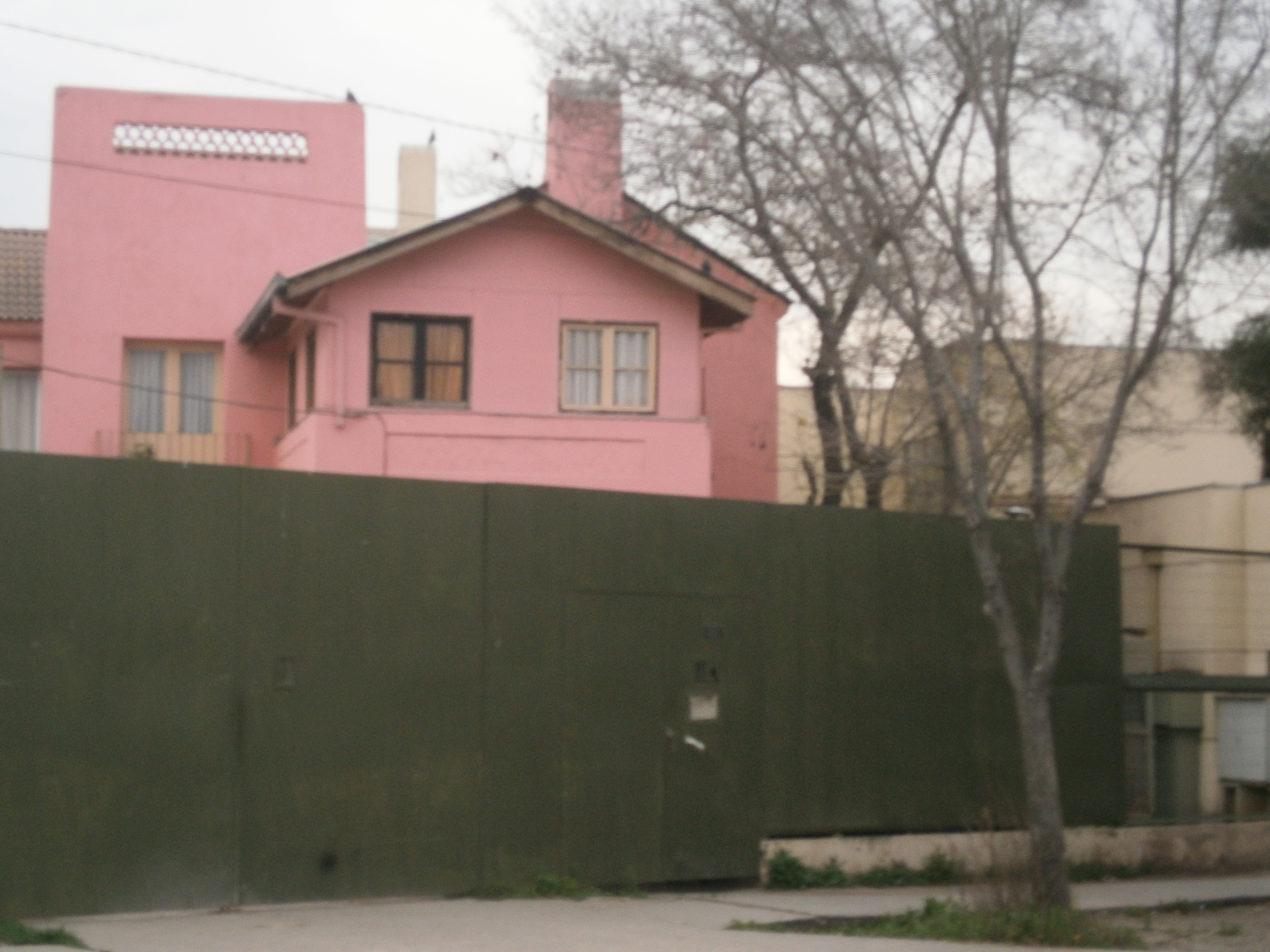
- Interactive map of Tres Álamos
- Location: San Joaquín, Chile; 33.5060°S 70.6198°W
- Status: Closed
- Opened: 1974
- Closed: 1976
- Managed by: Dirección de Inteligencia Nacional

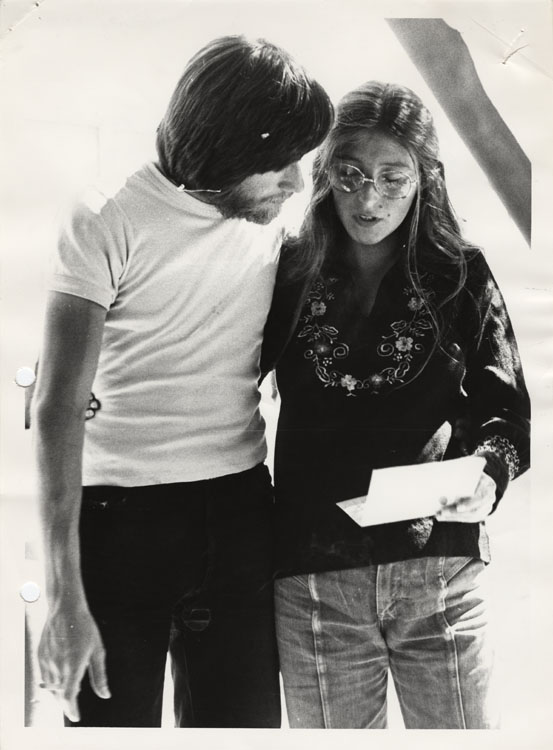
Prisoners released

Tres Alamos was a political prison camp that operated during the military dictatorship of Augusto Pinochet in Chile. This enclosure was operational between 1974 and 1976. Being the last camp of political prisoners. Its main importance was that the prisoners were identified, unlike other detention centers and could even receive visitors. From this place many detainees were expelled from the country.

== Details about the prison camp ==
Prisoners arrived there for other Dirección de Inteligencia Nacional (DINA), centers, an agency modeled after the Nazi Gestapo. The enclosure was divided into four pavilions, one of which was a solitary confinement called Cuatro Alamos.

According to testimonies delivered to the Valech Commission on this site:

"They were humiliated and insulted and living in overcrowded conditions. Some indicated that they were taken from the premises to be interrogated in other places. They were frequently punished by arbitrarily suspending visits and entry of food and clothing."

Among the many people who were detained in this place are the lawyer José Zalaquett, who was head of the legal department of the Pro Paz Committee, Luis Corvalán, general secretary of the Communist Party, and Fernando Flores, former minister of Salvador Allende, and Jorge Müller and Carmen Bueno, a Chilean cinematographer, and his girlfriend a Chilean actress and filmmaker who were both left wing activists.

This enclosure is located in the commune of San Joaquin, on Canada Street, No. 5359, near Vicuña Mackenna and Departmental. It is currently an area under the dependency of the National Service of Minors housing minors who violate the law.

== See also ==
- Disappearance of Jorge Müller and Carmen Bueno
- Prison camp

== Bibliography ==
- Ministry of Interior (2005). Report of the National Commission of Political Prison and Torture Commission. Santiago. ISBN 956-7808-47-3 .
- National Truth and Reconciliation Commission (1999).
- Report of the National Truth and Reconciliation Commission.
- Santiago: Reissue of the National Corporation for Reparation and Reconciliation.
