= A Long Journey (1967 film) =

1967 film by Patricio Kaulen

- film poster
- Spanish: Largo viaje
- Directed by: Patricio Kaulen
- Starring: Enrique Kaulen
- Cinematography: Andrés Martorell De Llanza
- Music by: Thomas Lefever
- Release date: 1967
- Running time: 83 minutes
- Country: Chile
- Language: Spanish

A Long Journey (Spanish: Largo viaje) is a 1967 Chilean drama film influenced by Italian neorealism and the French New Wave.

== Plot ==
A young boy from the impoverished neighborhoods of Santiago, Chile roams the city in search of his recently deceased newborn brother, known as 'el angelito'. The boy wishes to return the wings he believes the baby lost at his wake, as he believes his brother cannot enter heaven without them.

== Cast ==
- Enrique Kaulen - Boy
- Eliana Vidal - Unfaithful rich wife
- Fabio Zerpa - Rich wife's lover
- Rubén Ubeira - Boy's father
- María Castiglione - Boy's mother
- Emilio Gaete - Cuckolded rich husband
- Julio Tapia
- Hector Duvauchelle
