= Jackal of Nahueltoro =

Chilean mass murderer

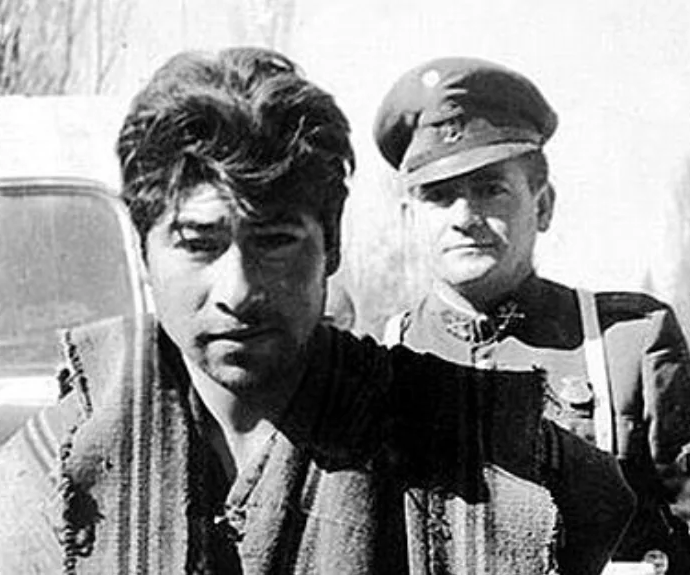
- Valenzuela during his September 1960 arrest
- Born: Jorge del Carmen Valenzuela Torres; 23 August 1938; Cocharcas, Chile
- Died: 30 April 1963 (aged 24); Chillán, Chile
- Cause of death: Execution by firing squad
- Resting place: Cemetery of San Carlos, Chile
- Other names: Fake names: José Jorge Castillo Torres; Jorge Sandoval Espinoza; José del Carmen Valenzuela Torres; Aliases: El Campano ("The Bell"); El Canaca ("The Chinaman"); La Trucha ("The Trout")
- Status: Executed
- Conviction: Murder (6 counts)
- Penalty: Death
- Accomplice: Rosa Rivas (1960)

Details
- Date: 20 August 1960
- Killed: 6
- Weapon: Scythe
- Date apprehended: 19 September 1960

Jorge del Carmen Valenzuela Torres (Note: In this Chilean name, the first or paternal surname is Valenzuela and the second or maternal family name is Torres.) (23 August 1938 – 30 April 1963), popularly known as El Chacal de Nahueltoro ("The Jackal of Nahueltoro"), was a Chilean farmer and mass murderer who killed his partner and his five stepchildren in what the Investigations Police of Chile has called one of the most important crimes of twentieth-century Chile. After spending almost three years in prison, he was sentenced to execution by firing squad, which was carried out in 1963. His execution sparked an important debate in Chilean society, questioning the legitimacy of executing a man who had shown regret and rehabilitation.

== Biography ==
Jorge Valenzuela was born in Cocharcas, a locality in San Carlos, to Melvina Torres Mella and Carlos Alberto Valenzuela Ortiz, who died in 1943. He left his home when he was only 7, after his mother's remarriage to one of his father's older sons from a previous marriage. From there, he lived by walking from city to city, taking any jobs he could, often resorting to stealing animals and other goods.

=== Murders ===
At one point Valenzuela had been living in a house in the commune of Nahueltoro in Ñuble province assigned to widow Rosa Elena Rivas Acuña, aged 38, with her and the five children she had from a previous marriage to Óscar Armando Sánchez (who had died several months earlier). The owners of the house eventually evicted them due to Valenzuela's reputation as an illiterate drunk, after which Valenzuela and Rivas moved to La Isla (island in the Ñuble River).

On 20 August 1960, Valenzuela was waiting for Rivas in the ranch they had built for a home. He wanted her to bring him money from her widow's pension so that he could continue his drinking with it, but Rivas was unable to get her pension because of a mechanical problem with the bus she was on. When she returned without the money, he flew into a rage and killed her with a scythe. Still in the drunken rage, he killed each of her children, stomping a 6-month-old baby to death in the process. After this, Valenzuela, still under the effects of alcohol, fell asleep.

After waking up and seeing what he had done, he proceeded to place stones over each one of the bodies, although it is not known why. He then fled the area, often using different names to prevent persecution, including "Jorge Sandoval Espinoza" and "José Jorge Castillo Torres". Valenzuela is also suspected of murdering 39-year-old Pedro Ojeda while on the run from police, but he was never tried or convicted of this crime.

Several days later, Exequiel "Quelo" Dinamarca, a local landlord, found the bodies of the six victims and informed the Carabineros. A month later, he was spotted in the sector of General Cruz in the commune of Pemuco, where two locals trapped him in a sack while he was in a state of sobriety and turned him over to police.

=== Legal process ===
After being arrested and imprisoned Valenzuela repented, became literate, became a stronger Catholic (with the guidance of the prison priest, Eloy Parra), and learned the trade of guitar-making. His eventual execution by firing squad was considered controversial as it went against the concept of rehabilitation, of which Valenzuela was considered a prime example.

== In popular culture ==
The film El Chacal de Nahueltoro (1969) was based on Valenzuela's story and is considered by some to be the best Chilean film ever made.

== See also ==
- Jackal of Pupunahue – 20th-century Chilean mass murderer
