= Marcelo Romo =

Chilean actor

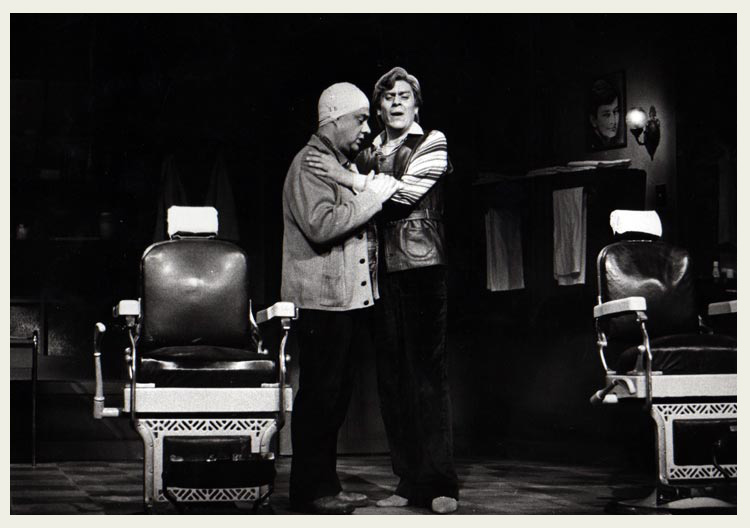
- Next to Julio Jung on stage
- Born: 23 April 1941; Santiago, Chile
- Died: 23 January 2018 (aged 76)
- Occupation: Actor
- Years active: 1969-2003

Marcelo Romo (23 April 1941 – 23 January 2018) was a Chilean actor. He appeared in more than thirty films since 1969.

== Selected filmography ==
Film
Year	Title	Role	Notes
1969	Jackal of Nahueltoro	Reporter	
1973	Enough Praying	El Sacerdote (The Priest)	
1994	The Shipwrecked	Aron	

TV
Year	Title	Role	Notes
1979	Emilia	Dr Maselli	
1989	Rubí rebelde	Felix	
1995	Estúpido Cupido	Miguel Santa Cruz	
1999	Aquelarre	Celedonio Meneses	
2001	Amores de mercado	Horacio Galdames	
