= The Chosen One (2003 film) =

- Theatrical release poster
- Directed by: Nacho Argiró; Gabriel López
- Written by: Nacho Argiró; Gabriel López
- Produced by: Nacho Argiró; Cristián de la Fuente; Gabriel López
- Starring: Sebastián Layseca
- Cinematography: Gabriel Reyes; Antonio Ríos
- Edited by: Pablo Ávila Champin
- Music by: Pablo Ávila Champin
- Production companies: Andes Films; Idea Fija Films
- Release date: October 16, 2003
- Running time: 100 minutes
- Country: Chile
- Language: Spanish

The Chosen One (Spanish: El nominado, lit. 'The nominee') is a 2003 Chilean slasher film written and directed by Nacho Argiró and Gabriel López. It stars Sebastián Layseca accompanied by Francisco Reyes, María Elena Swett and Cristián de la Fuente. It premiered on October 16, 2003, in Chilean theaters.

== Synopsis ==
Reality shows have been saturating the programming of the most popular television channels for years until finally the ratings begin to decline. In a last and desperate attempt, “Bajo Tierra” is created, where 12 young people must live for 90 days in an underground bunker in the middle of the Andes Mountains. Despite the effort, the rating levels do not improve, until Miguel is eliminated by his teammates, triggering his madness.

== Cast ==
The actors participating in this film are:

- Sebastián Layseca as Miguel
- Francisco Reyes as Patricio
- María Elena Swett as Sara
- Cristián de la Fuente as Rodrigo
- Tomás Vidiella as Mañungo Eyzaguirre
- Delfina Guzmán as Clara
- Fabián Gianola as ElBio
- Daniella Tobar as Ana
- Ramón Llao as Andueza
- René Laván as Kune
- Francisca Merino as Celina
- Íngrid Cruz as Inés
- Paulina De La Paz as Agustina
- Álvaro Escobar as Javier
- Katyna Huberman as Verónica
- Malucha Pinto as Lucrecia
- Julieta Cardinali as Catalina
- Juan Pablo Ogalde as César
- Luis Alarcón as President
- Fernando Larraín as Andrés
- Paola Camaggi as Susana
- Gonzalo Feito as Notero
