= Jaime Vadell =

Chilean actor

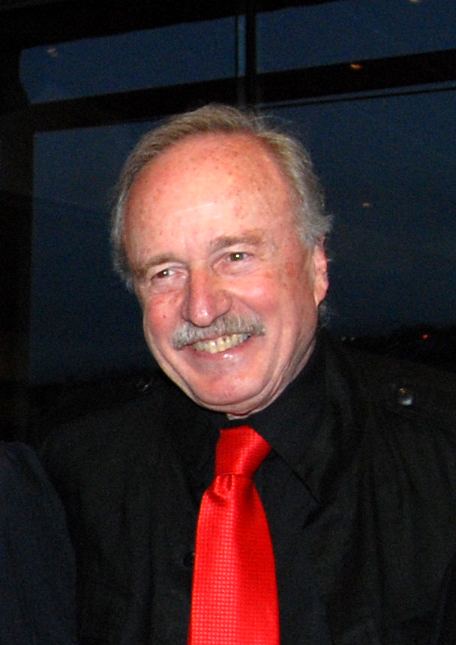
- Born: October 6, 1935 (age 90); Valparaíso
- Occupation: Actor

Jaime Patricio Vadell Amión (born 6 October 1935) is a Chilean film, theatre and television actor. He is one of the most recognisable faces in Chilean telenovelas and cinema, having played key roles in films directed by Raúl Ruiz, Silvio Caiozzi and Pablo Larraín.

== Selected filmography ==
- Tres tristes tigres (1968)
- Caliche sangriento (1969)
- Los testigos (1971)
- Nadie dijo nada (1971)
- El realismo socialista (1973)
- La expropiación (1974)
- Julio comienza en julio (1979)
- El zapato chino (1979)
- Amelia Lópes O'Neill (1991)
- Coronación (2000)
- Tendida mirando las estrellas (2004)
- Se arrienda (2005)
- Padre nuestro (2005)
- El regalo (2008)
- Post Mortem (2010)
- No (2012)
- Aurora (2014)
- El Club (2015)
- Neruda (2016)
- My tender Matador (2019)
- El Conde (2023)

== Television ==
- La madrastra (1981)
- Tic Tac (1997)
- Loca piel (1998)
- Amores de mercado (2001)
- El señor de La Querencia (2008)
- Hijos del Monte (2008-2009)
- La familia de al lado (2010-2011)
- Aquí mando yo (2011-2012)
- Separados (2012-2013)
- Secretos en el jardín (2013-2014)
- Chipe libre (2014-2015)
- Pobre Gallo (2016)
