= Nelson Villagra =

Chilean actor (born 1937)

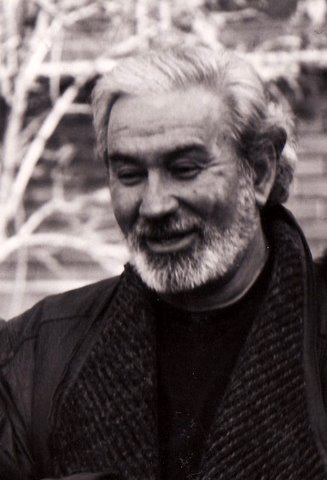
- Born: 9 August 1937 (age 89); Chillán, Chile
- Occupations: Actor, director, author
- Years active: 1967-present

Nelson Villagra (born 9 August 1937) is a Chilean actor, writer and director of stage and screen. He is recognised as one of the most masterful actors in Chilean cinema and is widely known in Chile for his exceptional portrayal of an intellectually disabled murderer in Miguel Littín's El Chacal de Nahueltoro (1969). He also collaborated with Raúl Ruiz on Tres tristes tigres (1968), La colonia penal (1970) and Nadie dijo nada (1971).

In 1973, Villagra was exiled from Chile as a result of the military coup which led to the Pinochet dictatorship. After a time in Europe, he proceeded to Cuba and worked with some of the key Latin American directors of the period, such as Humberto Solás (Cantata de Chile) and Tomás Gutiérrez Alea, winning the Best Actor award for his role as 'El Conde' in Gutiérrez Alea's The Last Supper at the 1978 Biarritz Film Festival. In 1979, he played a military torturer in Sergio Castilla's film Prisioneros desaparecidos, a role for which he won the Best Actor award at the San Sebastián Film Festival.

== Early life and film career ==
Nelson Garrido Villagra was born in Chillán in southern Chile on 9 August 1937. His artistic activities began in 1950, at the age of 13, when he was enrolled at the School of Artistic Culture of Chillán (Escuela de Cultura Artística de Chillán) under the tuition of Professor Carlos Cortés with whom he worked on Radiodifusión Cultural de Chillán. Later in 1950, Villagra joined Chillán Cultural Broadcasting, a cultural group, who later founded the Teatro Experimental de Chillán, Chillán Choir, and the Institute of Cultural Extension of the city. This group was led by Ciro Vargas Mellado, with help from the capital - Santiago de Chile - Enrique Gajardo Velasquez. Both Mellado and Velasquez had a large influence on Villagra's theatrical and cultural training.

In 1955 he was admitted to the School of Theatre at the University of Chile. By this time, Villagra already had a solid theatrical background that made him stand out among the students of the School. As a freshman at the University, by chance, he was asked to replace a professional actor in a production of the University's Experimental Theatre (ITUCH) a few days before it opened. It was only a small part, but critics at the premiere regarded him as "a hope for the Chilean theatre."

Upon graduation from the School of Theatre in 1958, he was hired by the Teatro de la Universidad de Concepción (TUC), which had just begun the process of professionalization, having produced many excellent amateur works. The TUC was first led by Gabriel Martinez-Sotomayor, a renowned teacher with profound knowledge of the work of Russian theatre teacher Stanislavsky. The TUC was able to establish a collective attitude to their stage work, without compromising the individual development of its actors. "We created a working group which enabled all we learned," said Villagra.

Towards the end of 1959, the TUC reported that Pedro de la Barra - considered by many the father of university theatres in Chile - had left the post of artistic and administrative director at the Institute of Theatre (formerly ITUCH) and was invited to work with their group. It was through these two masters, and Gabriel Martinez-Sotomayor, that consolidated Villagra's place in the TUC for a duration of 7 years. It was during this period that his distinct talent was recognized, a recognition that would later lead him to film acting.

In early 1965, Villagra was hired by the Theatre ICTUS of Santiago, and moved to the capital with his family. Among several works that cast Villagra as an actor, the most memorable was undoubtedly his brilliant interpretation of the African-American Randall in the play Slow Dance Towards the Gallows by William Hanley (Slow Dance on the Killing Ground).

Villagra subsequently worked in various theatre groups in Santiago - including The council (formed by himself and four companions of the TUC) as well as on television and in seven Chilean films, most famously Three Sad Tigers (1968) and El Chacal de Nahueltoro (1969).

On 11 September 1973, his artistic career was interrupted when he was forced into exile in Paris, owing to his social and political activities in Chile. He also spent periods in Rome and later in Havana from 1975 to 1986, where he actively participated in Cuban cinema.

He worked in seven films in Cuba, the most prominent of these being The Last Supper by Gutiérrez Alea, and Black River by Manuel Perez - in addition to several co-productions filmed in Cuba, Mexico, France and Venezuela. In 1986, he settled in Montreal, Quebec, Canada - where he met and married Begoña Zabala, a Basque actress. He worked in four films for Quebec cinema.

== Later life and film career ==
In 1987, Villagra won the stage contest 'Néo-Québécois Author', sponsored by Théâtre d'Aujourd'hui de Montréal. The written work is called "Rara Avis", and was staged by Bernard Martineau at the workshop stage of the Théâtre d'Aujourd'hui. In 1988 the ban placed upon entering Chile was lifted for 100 past exiles, a list which included Villagra's name. 1989 he returned to Chile temporarily to participate in a film that failed to materialize in cinemas, but was received by the cinema and acting communities - as well as intellectuals and political personalities - in a bustling social activity at the Café-Restaurant "The Biographer".

Back in Montreal in 1989, Villagra was invited to shoot his first French-language film, taking a leading role in Corbeau, directed by Carlos Ferrand. That same year he was called for another Québécois film, Cargo, directed by François Girard. In 1990, he was cast in Artikos directed by Renny Bartlett and produced for the BBC in London. In 1992, Villagra decided to set up play in Montreal. The Lord of Light was self-written, and made a theatrical tour to Chile lasting three months and extending to Ancud, Chiloé.

He made a second trip to Chile in 1992 at the invitation of the Viña del Mar Film Festival, where he received a moving tribute.

Drawing upon the Chilean reactions to his play The Lord of Light, Villagra decided to submit the piece for translation into French. Also in 1992 he translated the work entitled "Le Seigneur des Lumières", and wins for the second time the Néo-Québécois Authors Contest in Montreal - a prize including dramatized readings of the play by actors from the Théâtre d'Aujourd'hui. 1992 also saw Villagra invited to audition in qualification for a bilingual Italian-French role in the film The Sarrasine directed by Paul Tana. Upon completion, the film was sent to Rome for dubbing in Italian. However, the dubbing director in Rome judged that Villagra fully dominated in phonetics and accent required and left his voice in the film, unmodified.

== Recent work ==
In 1997 Villagra returned to Chile with his wife Begoña, also an actor, owing to various work commitments. There they remained for 6 years living in Santiago and receiving the praise of spectators and critics all over. Villagra also worked in Chilean television and film, extending his stay until 2003 inclusively. During 1998, the second year of the couple's residence in Chile, Villagra was invited by the National Theatre to participate in the assembly of a work by August Strindberg - Playing with Fire - directed by guest Swedish director Staffan Valdemar Holm. After a successful season in Chile, the play went on to the Strindberg Festival in Stockholm. Also in 1998, Villagra wrote a verse play The Farce of the Knight and Death which toured Ñuble Province, his native land, and acted in all three television movies and three films. The most notable of these works - despite the brevity of Villagra's role - was Tendida mirando las estrellas by director Andrés Racz. In theatre, Villagra - along with José Ignacio García and wife Begoña Zabala - achieved a particular success with the staging of The English Lover by Marguerite Duras, directed by Jaime Silva.

In late 2003, Villagra returned to Montreal with his wife, only to return to Chile a few months later in early 2004 to join the cast of a new TV series with Canal 13. Upon returning to Montreal in late 2004, he declared that in future he will only participate in "artistically worthwhile" projects. Thus, since 2004, despite having received several offers, Villagra has only accepted the film project El regalo, filmed in Chillán (Chile) in 2008.

Villagra currently resides in Montreal, after having worked throughout his life in more than 60 plays, 40 films and TV series. Along with his wife and fellow actors he has begun to develop an art collective which has already produced one short film, Transfer.

== Selected filmography ==
- Three Sad Tigers (1968)
- Jackal of Nahueltoro (1969)
- The Penal Colony (1970)
- Nadie dijo nada (1971)
- The Promised Land (1973)
- The Last Supper (1976)
- Cantata de Chile (1976)
- Río Negro (1977)
- The Recourse to the Method (1978)
- La rosa de los vientos (1978)
- The Widow of Montiel (1979)
- Cecilia (1982)
- Amnesia (1994)
- Tierra del Fuego (2000)
- El regalo (2008)
