= The Recourse to the Method =

1978 film

- Film poster
- Directed by: Miguel Littín
- Written by: Alejo Carpentier; Régis Debray; Miguel Littín
- Produced by: Héctor López; Michèle Ray-Gavras; Vicente Silva
- Starring: Nelson Villagra
- Cinematography: Ricardo Aronovich
- Edited by: Ramón Aupart
- Release date: 5 May 1978
- Running time: 164 minutes
- Countries: Mexico; Cuba
- Language: Spanish

The Recourse to the Method (Spanish: El recurso del método) is a Mexican-Cuban drama film directed by Chilean filmmaker Miguel Littín. It is based on the 1974 novel of the same name written by Alejo Carpentier. It was entered into the 1978 Cannes Film Festival. The film was also selected as the Cuban entry for the Best Foreign Language Film at the 51st Academy Awards, but was not accepted as a nominee.

== Cast ==
- Nelson Villagra - El Primer Magistrado
- Ernesto Gómez Cruz - Cholo
- Salvador Sánchez - Peralta
- Reynaldo Miravalles - Oberst Hoffmann
- Raúl Pomares - General Galván
- Katy Jurado - La Mayorala
- Alain Cuny - El Académico
- Gabriel Retes - El Estudiante
- María Adelina Vera - La Hija del Presidente
- Roger Cudney - Army captain
- Didier Flamand
- Denis Perrot
- Monique Perrot
- Jacques Rispal

== See also ==
- List of submissions to the 51st Academy Awards for Best Foreign Language Film
- List of Cuban submissions for the Academy Award for Best Foreign Language Film
