= Nadie dijo nada =

1971 film

- Film poster
- Directed by: Raúl Ruiz
- Written by: Raúl Ruiz; Max Beerbohm
- Starring: Carlos Solanos
- Cinematography: Silvio Caiozzi
- Edited by: Carlos Piaggio
- Release date: 1971
- Running time: 135 minutes
- Country: Chile
- Language: Spanish

Nadie dijo nada, (AKA: Nessuno disse niente) (English: Nobody Said Anything) is a 1971 Chilean-Italian comedy film directed by Raúl Ruiz.

== Cast ==
- Carlos Solanos - Waldo Martínez
- Jaime Vadell - Germán
- Luis Vilches - Tomás
- Luis Alarcón - The poet
- Nelson Villagra - Tony Ventura
- Shenda Román - Elsa
- Pedro Gaete - God
- Humberto Miranda - Suicide
- Carla Cristi - Abandoned mother
- Carmen Lara - Abandoned wife
