= El regalo =

- Film poster
- Directed by: Cristián Galaz; Andrea Ugalde
- Written by: Cristián Galaz; Andrea Ugalde; Mateo Iribarren; Orlando Lübbert
- Produced by: Mauricio Sepúlveda; Paula Sáenz-Laguna
- Starring: Nelson Villagra; Julio Jung; Jaime Vadell; Delfina Guzmán; Gloria Münchmeyer; Héctor Noguera
- Cinematography: David Bravo
- Edited by: Soledad Salfate
- Music by: Miguel Miranda; José Miguel Tobar
- Production company: Delirio Films
- Release date: October 2, 2008
- Running time: 108 minutes
- Country: Chile
- Language: Spanish

El regalo (lit. 'The gift') is a 2008 Chilean romantic comedy film directed by Cristián Galaz & Andrea Ugalde and written by Galaz, Ugalde, Mateo Iribarren & Orlando Lübbert. It stars Nelson Villagra, Jamie Vadell, Julio Jung, Delfina Guzmán and Gloria Munchmeyer. It premiered on October 2, 2008 in Chilean theaters.

== Synopsis ==
Francisco is going through one of the hardest moments of his life, right now that he has just retired to spend more time with his wife, she has just become ill and died suddenly. Francisco is devastated, he could not imagine a day of his life without his wife and he even considers the option of suicide.

Pachecho and Tito have been their best friends for many years and to cheer up their friend they decide to give him a gift, to invite him to a five-star all-inclusive resort for a week. Francisco reluctantly accepts the gift and once there he will realize that even though the years go by, he can still have a very young and alive spirit. Together with his friends and a love of youth, he will live one of the happiest weeks of his life, which will end up changing the lives of all of them.

== Cast ==
The actors participating in this film are:

- Nelson Villagra as Francisco
- Jamie Vadell as Pacheco
- Julio Jung as Tito
- Delfina Guzmán as Carmen
- Hector Noguera as Nicholas
- Gloria Munchmeyer as Lucy
- Francis Rodriguez as Mario
- Jorge Arecheta as Student
- Mario Soto as Teacher 1
