= The Widow of Montiel =

1979 film

- film poster
- Directed by: Miguel Littín
- Written by: Miguel Littín; José Agustín; Gabriel García Márquez
- Produced by: Hernán Littin
- Starring: Geraldine Chaplin
- Cinematography: Patricio Castilla
- Edited by: Nelson Rodríguez
- Release date: 1 December 1979
- Running time: 105 minutes
- Countries: Mexico; Colombia; Venezuela; Cuba
- Language: Spanish

The Widow of Montiel (Spanish: La Viuda de Montiel) is a 1979 Mexican-Colombian drama film directed by Chilean filmmaker Miguel Littín. It is based on a short story of the same name by the Colombian Nobel Prize-winning author Gabriel García Marquez. It was entered into the 30th Berlin International Film Festival.

== Cast ==
- Geraldine Chaplin - Adelaida
- Nelson Villagra - Chepe Montiel
- Katy Jurado - Mamá Grande
- Eduardo Gil
- Pilar Romero - Hilaria
- Ernesto Gómez Cruz - Carmichael
- Reynaldo Miravalles
- Alejandro Parodi - Alacaide
