= Acta general de Chile =

1986 documentary film directed by Miguel Littín

Acta General de Chile
- film poster
- Directed by: Miguel Littín
- Release date: 1986
- Running time: 240 minutes
- Countries: Chile, Cuba
- Language: Spanish

Acta General de Chile is a 1986 documentary film about the Pinochet dictatorship directed by Miguel Littín whose production was described by Gabriel García Marquez in Clandestine in Chile.
