= Fabio Zerpa =

Uruguayan writer and ufologist (1928–2019)

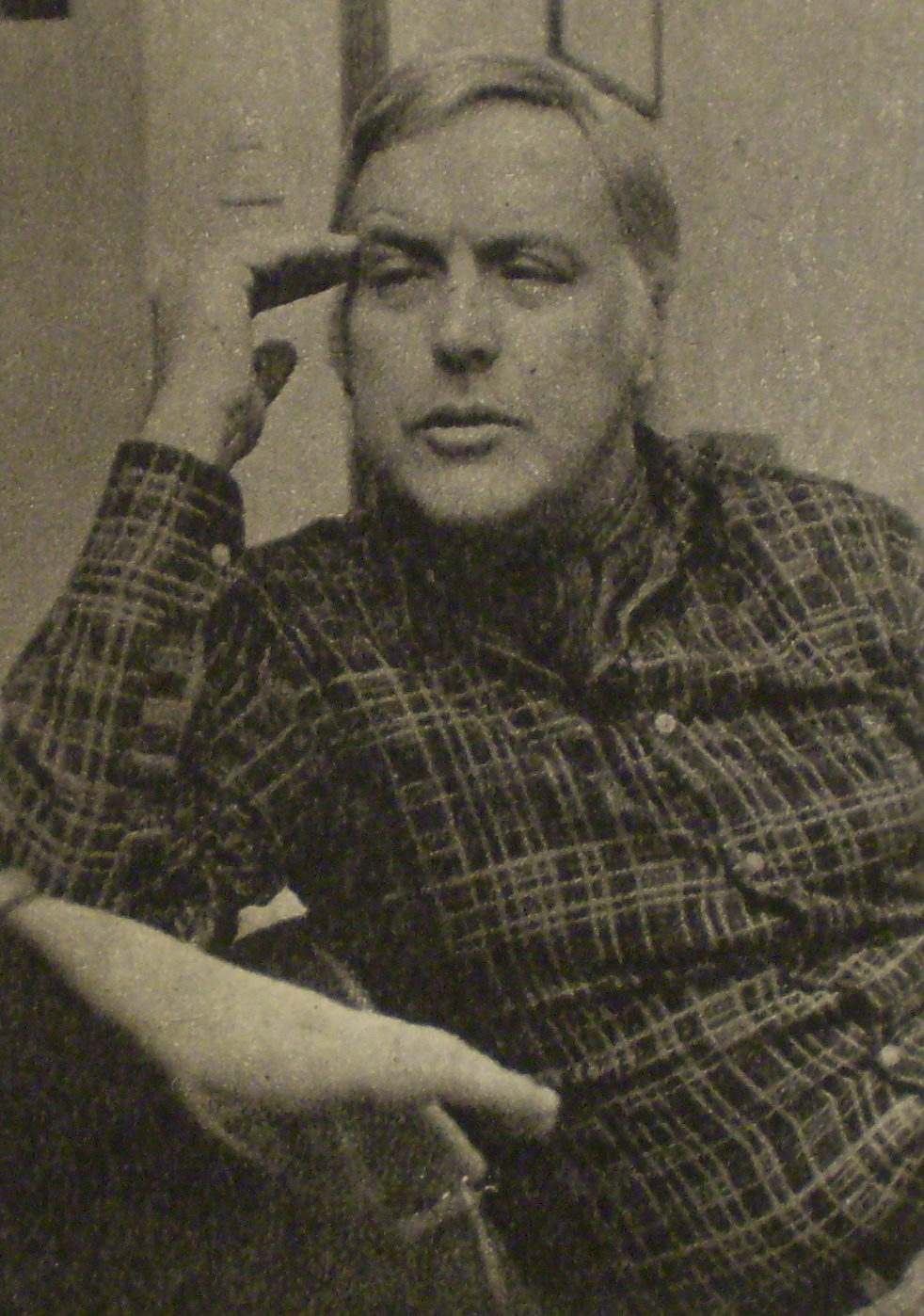
- Zerpa in 1969
- Born: 4 December 1928; Rosario, Uruguay
- Died: 7 August 2019 (aged 90)
- Occupations: Ufologist, writer, historian, parapsychologist
- Website: fabiozerpa.com.ar

Fabio Zerpa (4 December 1928, Rosario, Uruguay – 7 August 2019, Buenos Aires, Argentina) was a Uruguayan actor, parapsychologist, and UFO researcher. He resided in Argentina from 1950 until his death in 2019.

== Career ==
Fabio Zerpa arrived in Argentina in 1950. Following a short theatrical career, he became increasingly interested in extraterrestrial life, having already studied psychology. After some years of investigation, Zerpa started to give his first conferences at the beginning of the 1960s. In 1966, he created the radio program Más allá de la cuarta dimensión (Beyond the Fourth Dimension). Fabio Zerpa would ultimately report on more than 3,000 cases of UFO sightings and alleged contact with extraterrestrials. Beginning in 2001, he was also the director of the online magazine El Quinto Hombre (The Fifth Man).

== Bibliography ==
- Un hombre en el Universo (A Man In The Universe, Cielosur – Argentina – 1975)
- El OVNI y sus misterios (UFO And Its Mysteries, Nauta – Spain – 1976)
- Dos científicos viajan en OVNI (Two Scientists Travel By UFO, Cielosur – Argentina – 1977)
- Los Hombres De Negro y los OVNI (Men In Black And UFO, Plaza & Janes – Spain – 1977)(Reedited by Planeta – Argentina in 1989)
- El reino subterráneo (The Underground Kingdom, Planeta – Argentina – 1990)
- El mundo de las vidas anteriores (The World Of Past Lives, Planeta – Argentina – 1991)
- Apertura de lo insólito (Opening of the Unusual, Club de Lectores – Argentina – 1991)
- Predicciones de la Nueva Era (Predictions Of The New Age, CS – 1992)
- La vida desde adentro (Life From The Inside, Beas – 1993)
- Los OVNIs existen y son extraterrestres (UFOs Exists And They Are Alien, Planeta – Argentina – 1994/5)
- Ellos, los seres extraterrestres (They, The Alien Beings, Ameghino – 1996)
- Los verdaderos Hombres De Negro (The Real Men In Black, Ameghino – 1997)
- Predicciones para el nuevo siglo (Predictions For The New Century, H&H Editors – 1999)
- El Nostradamus de América – (Americas' Nostradamus, Ediciones Continente – 2003)
