= Disappearance of Carmen Bueno and Jorge Müller =

Chilean activists missing since 1974

Carmen Bueno
- Born: Carmen Cecilia Bueno Cifuentes; 16 July 1950; Santiago de Chile, Chile
- Disappeared: 29 November 1974 (aged 24); Villa Grimaldi
- Status: Missing for 51 years, 10 months and 1 day
- Occupations: Actress, filmmaker
- Known for: The Promised Land, disappearance and being tortured
- Partner: Jorge Müller

Jorge Müller
- Born: Jorge Hernán Müller Silva; 10 January 1947; Santiago de Chile, Chile
- Disappeared: 29 November 1974 (aged 27); Villa Grimaldi
- Status: Missing for 51 years, 10 months and 1 day
- Occupation: Cinematographer
- Known for: The Battle of Chile, disappearance and being tortured
- Partner: Carmen Bueno
- Parents: Rodolfo Müller (father); Irma Silva (mother)

Jorge Hernán Müller Silva (born 10 January 1947), a Chilean cinematographer, and his girlfriend, Carmen Cecilia Bueno Cifuentes (born 16 July 1950), a Chilean actress and filmmaker, were left activists from the Revolutionary Left Movement (MIR) who were detained on 29 November 1974 by security police during the military dictatorship of Augusto Pinochet. While held in Villa Grimaldi, it is believed that they both were subjected to torture. Their fate remains unknown.

== Biographies ==
Jorge Müller was a cinematographer and also worked on Camera and Electrical and Sound Department who had studied at the Film School of the University of Chile at Viña del Mar and had worked as an assistant cameraman and director of photography on many award-winning Chilean and international productions, including documentaries such as The Battle of Chile – part I, part II, and part III, The First Year, Brazil: A Report On Torture, and The Promised Land as well as other feature films. Carmen Bueno was known for being in movies such as The Battle of Chile, A la sombra del sol, and was production assistant on the documentary El primer año.

== Disappearance ==
Bueno and Müller, who were both Revolutionary Left Movement (MIR) activists, were interrogated and tortured at Villa Grimaldi before they "disappeared" on 29 November 1974, in a prison detention camp, after they were seized and forced into a car by agents who were working for the Dirección de Inteligencia Nacional (DINA), an agency modeled after the Nazi Gestapo.

Prior to this, Bueno and Müller had attended a party with the cast and crew of another film that had opened the night before at a place called Cine Las Condes. When they left for work at Chile Films, they never arrived. Later on agents who had appeared to be civilians based on the way they were dressed claimed to have seen them earlier.

Virtually no information became available regarding their whereabouts or their physical condition as their families and friends unsuccessfully attempted to make contact with them. Subsequently, two former prisoners of the Tres Álamos concentration camp near Santiago said that they had seen Bueno there. One reported having seen Bueno in very bad physical condition while being forcefully carried by two men. He stated that for several weeks straight she was taken on a daily basis to long torture sessions where she was serially raped. After which they would bring her back with her legs half paralyzed, and where they could hear her screaming in severe agony both during the day and night. Another former prisoner also testified that both Müller and Bueno had been subjected to beatings and torture with electric current being used upon them.

The following month, Müller's mother was told that she would be able to see her son, but later learned that visiting at the camp was not permitted, so she was unable to do so. Events like this later became well documented.

== Aftermath ==
In November 2015, 56 former DINA agents received prison sentences for the crime of torturing Bueno and Müller. Müller's mother has written about her son and Bueno's disappearance in a book called Tapestries of Hope, Threads of Love: The Arpillera Movement in Chile. A book about Bueno's disappearance called The Disappearance of Carmen Bueno was also written and published by Liza Stewart.

Spanish music videos posted on YouTube and websites have been made to honor Bueno that shows her life events and her kidnapping as well.

== See also ==
- List of kidnappings (1970–1979)
- List of people who disappeared mysteriously (1970s)

== Biography ==
- Comisión Nacional de Verdad y Reconciliación (1991). Informe de la Comisión Nacional de Verdad y Reconciliación. Santiago: Edición Oficial.
