= Delfina Guzmán =

Chilean actress

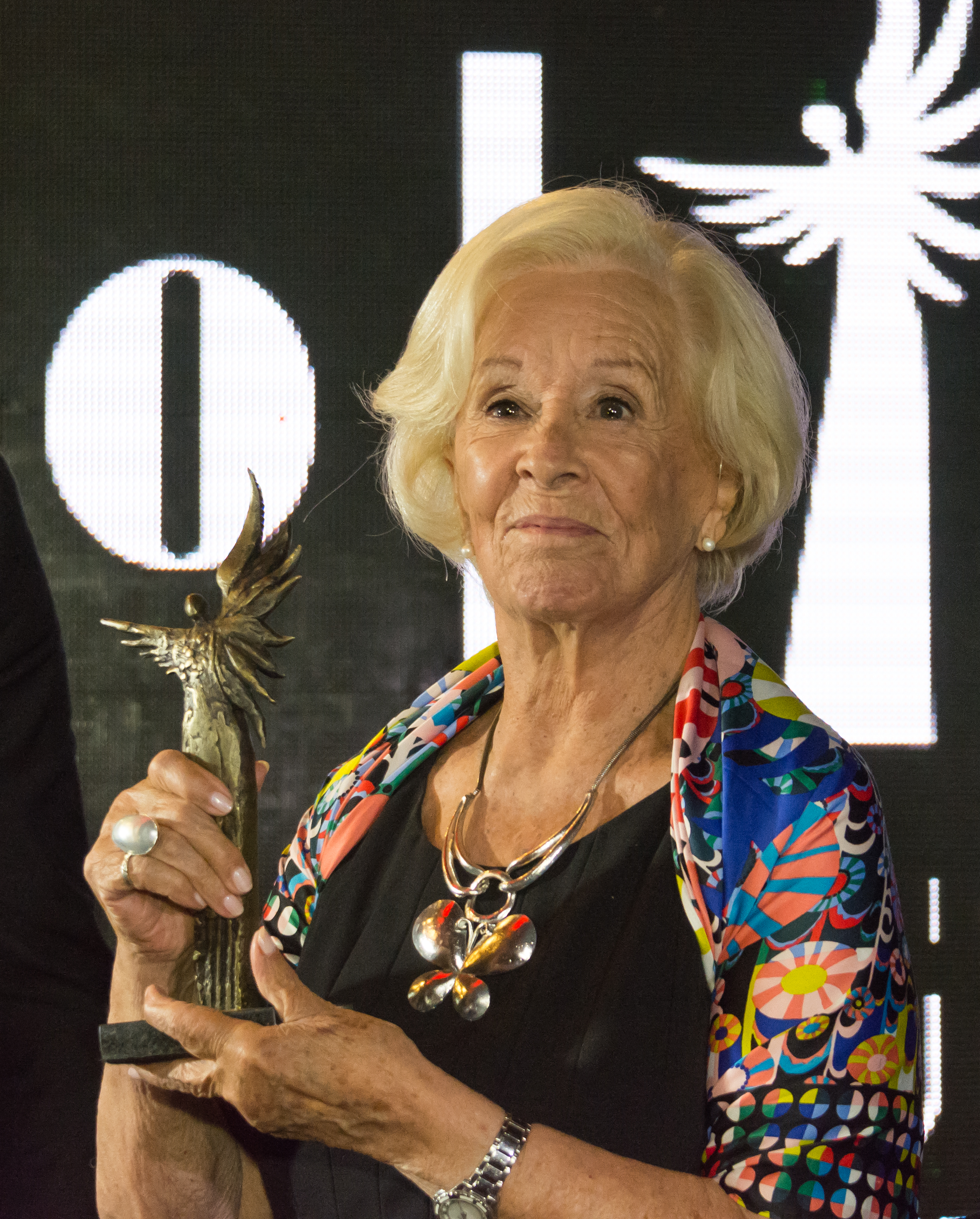
- Born: María Delfina Guzmán Correa; 7 April 1928 (age 98); Santiago de Chile
- Education: University of Chile
- Occupation: Actress
- Years active: 1968–present

Delfina Guzmán Correa (born 7 April 1928) is a Chilean actress. She has appeared in more than 30 films and television shows since 1968. She starred in the 1968 Raúl Ruiz film Three Sad Tigers. She is the daughter of Florencio Guzmán Larraín and María Luisa Correa Ugarte. Her son, Nicolás Eyzaguirre, is a Chilean economist.

== Selected filmography ==
- Three Sad Tigers (1968)
- The Expropriation (1972)
- The Chosen One (2003) as Clara
- El regalo (2008) as Carmen
- La Nana (2009) as the Grandmother
- Bombal (2012) as Grandmother

== Filmography ==
Soap Opera and television credits
Year	Title	Role	Notes
1994	Rompecorazón	Julia Abbott	
1995	Estúpido Cupido	Asunsion Undurraga	
1996	Sucupira	Mariana Montero	
1997	Oro Verde	Helga Schmidt	
1998	Iorana	Virginia Sanz	
1999	La Fiera	Amelia Cox	
2000	Romané	Adela Ovalle	
2001	Pampa Ilusión	Mercedes Jorquera	
2002	El Circo de las Montini	Olga I Montini	
2003	Puertas Adentro	Marta Silva	
2004	Los Pincheira	Josefina Covarrubias	
2005	Los Capo	Severina Saccenti	
2006	Cómplices	Brunilda Sanhueza	
2007	Corazón de María	Magdalena Rossi	
2008	Viuda Alegre	Nora Norambuena	
2010	Martín Rivas	Candelaria Urbina	
2011	Témpano	Malu Cordero	
2012	Dama y Obrero	Alfonsina Cardemil	
2013	Socias	Mercedes Valdés	
2014	No abras la puerta	Victoria Edwards	
2017	La Colombiana	Rosa O'Higgins	
2017	Wena profe	Estela Novoa	
