= The Promised Land (1973 film) =

1973 film

- Film poster
- Directed by: Miguel Littín
- Written by: Miguel Littín
- Starring: Nelson Villagra
- Cinematography: Affonso Beato
- Release date: July 1973
- Running time: 120 minutes
- Country: Chile
- Language: Spanish

The Promised Land (Spanish: La tierra prometida) is a 1972 Chilean drama film written and directed by Miguel Littín. It was entered into the 8th Moscow International Film Festival.

The film was not officially released until 1991 due to the military coup in 1973, which prevented the production from being completed in Chile. It was finished by Littín in Cuba with the collaboration of the Cuban Institute of Art and Cinematographic Industry.

The performances of Nelson Villagra and Marcelo Gaete as the lead actors stand out. The music includes the participation of Inti Illimani and Ángel Parra, whose direction was supervised by Luis Advis.

== Plot ==
In the late 1920s, the economic crisis in Chile affected thousands of peasants, as well as displaced nitrate workers from closed northern offices. One such displaced person, El Traje Cruzado, meets José Durán, and they discuss revolution and the right of peasants to occupy state lands. They arrive in Palmilla and establish a town, sharing harvests and profits. When news of the Socialist Republic of Chile reaches them, the peasants arm themselves and occupy the mayor's office in El Huique. However, the socialist revolution fails, and they are evicted amid shots from uniformed officers. The peasants resist, but one by one, they fall, and José is executed. The movie is narrated by a witness and includes elements of popular religiosity. The Virgin Mary is mentioned as being with the peasants and helping them, but her face changes when they are evicted from the town hall, indicating that she has abandoned them. In the final scene, a semi-nude and bloodied Virgin accompanies José in his last moments.

== Cast ==
- Nelson Villagra
- Marcelo Gaete
- Rafael Benavente
- Shenda Román
- Pedro Manuel Álvarez
- Carmen Bueno
- Mireya Kulczewsky (as Mireya Kulchesky)
- Aníbal Reyna
