= The Shipwrecked =

1994 film

- Film poster
- Directed by: Miguel Littín
- Written by: Miguel Littín
- Produced by: Ely Menz; Yvon Provost
- Starring: Luis Alarcón
- Cinematography: Hans Burman
- Edited by: Rudolfo Wedeles
- Music by: Jorge Arriagada; Ángel Parra
- Release date: May 1994
- Running time: 118 minutes
- Country: Chile
- Language: Spanish

The Shipwrecked (Spanish: Los náufragos) is a 1994 Chilean drama film directed by Miguel Littín. It was screened in the Un Certain Regard section at the 1994 Cannes Film Festival.

== Plot ==
Aron is an exiled Chilean whose father has died during his years of absence, and whose brother is one of the thousands of 'disappeared'. Aron, back in his country, feels like a castaway lost in a place he doesn't recognize, trying to understand what happened to his family and to the country he once knew.

== Cast ==
- Luis Alarcón as Sebastian Mola
- Bastián Bodenhöfer as Ur
- Tennyson Ferrada as Rene
- Benjamin Littin
- Marcelo Romo as Aron
- Valentina Vargas as Isol
