= Padre nuestro (2005 film) =

- Directed by: Rodrigo Sepúlveda
- Written by: Rodrigo Sepúlveda
- Starring: Jaime Vadell; Luis Gnecco; Francisco Pérez-Bannen; Cecilia Roth; Amparo Noguera
- Release dates: October 13, 2005 (Viña del Mar Film Festival); October 5, 2006 (Chile)
- Country: Chile
- Language: Spanish

Padre nuestro is a 2005 Chilean comedy-drama film directed by Rodrigo Sepúlveda. It was Chile's submission to the 80th Academy Awards for the Academy Award for Best Foreign Language Film, but was not selected as a nominee. The film had its release in October 2005, at the Viña del Mar Film Festival. Its theatrically release came a year later, in October 2006.

== Plot ==
"Children, please get me out of here." That was the last wish of Caco, a hardened womanizer who had abandoned his family 9 years ago, to his children Pedro, Meche, and Roberto while spending his last day in a hospital in Valparaíso. They had no idea that this fun-loving, cheerful, and eccentric old man would do everything in his power to reunite his family, even if it meant sacrificing his life.

== See also ==
- List of submissions to the 80th Academy Awards for Best Foreign Language Film
