= Cantata de Chile =

- Directed by: Humberto Solás
- Starring: Nelson Villagra
- Music by: Leo Brouwer
- Release date: 1976
- Running time: 119 minutes
- Country: Cuba
- Language: Spanish

Cantata de Chile is a 1976 Cuban social realist musical epic film directed by Humberto Solás about the 1907 Santa María School massacre of striking workers in Chile.

== Cast ==
- Nelson Villagra
- Shenda Román
- Eric Heresmann
- Alfredo Tornquist
- Leonardo Perucci
- Peggy Cordero
- Flavia Ugalde
- Roberto Contreras
