= Tierra del Fuego (film) =

2000 film

- Mexican DVD cover
- Directed by: Miguel Littín
- Written by: Miguel Littín; Francisco Coloane; Tonino Guerra; Luis Sepúlveda
- Produced by: Roberto Manni
- Starring: Jorge Perugorría
- Cinematography: Giuseppe Lanci
- Edited by: Ernest Blasi
- Release date: 19 May 2000
- Running time: 108 minutes
- Country: Chile
- Language: Spanish

Tierra del Fuego is a 2000 Chilean drama film directed by Miguel Littín. Based on a short story of the same name by Francisco Coloane, it is about the conquest of Tierra del Fuego by Julius Popper. It was screened in the Un Certain Regard section at the 2000 Cannes Film Festival.

== Plot ==
The film is set in the late 19th century, when Julius Popper (1857–1893) claims the Isla Grande of Tierra del Fuego on behalf of Queen Elisabeth of Wied of Romania (also known as Carmen Sylva; 1843–1916). Popper's goal is to search for gold, which he pursues under the motto "civilization or death." He is accompanied by a diverse group of characters from various nationalities, including Armenia, a beautiful prostitute; Spiro, an Italian adventurer; Shaeffer, a loyal German follower of Popper; Novak, an Austrian who serves as the group's general; and Silveira, a Galician bagpipe interpreter. The film also highlights the unknown and rugged nature of the island.

== Cast ==
- Jorge Perugorría as Julius Popper
- Ornella Muti as Armenia
- Tamara Acosta as Mennar
- Nelson Villagra as Novak
- Álvaro Rudolphy as Schaeffer
- Nancho Novo as Silveira
- Luis Alarcón as Alexis
- Claudio Santamaria as Spiro
- Uxía Blanco as Mother Silveira
- Omero Antonutti
- Héctor Delgado
- Mauricio Pesutic
- Mateo Iribarren
