= The Penal Colony (film) =

1970 film

- Film poster
- Directed by: Raúl Ruiz
- Written by: Raúl Ruiz; Franz Kafka
- Produced by: Darío Pulgar
- Starring: Luis Alarcón
- Cinematography: Héctor Ríos
- Edited by: Carlos Piaggio
- Release date: 1970
- Running time: 75 minutes
- Country: Chile
- Language: Spanish

The Penal Colony (Spanish: La colonia penal) is a 1970 Chilean drama film directed by Raúl Ruiz. It is based on Franz Kafka's 1919 short story "In the Penal Colony".

== Cast ==
- Luis Alarcón as President
- Mónica Echeverría as Journalist
- Aníbal Reyna as Minister
- Nelson Villagra
