= Clandestine in Chile =

Report by Gabriel García Márquez

- First edition cover (Henry Holt and Company)
- Author: Gabriel García Márquez
- Original title: La aventura de Miguel Littín clandestino en Chile
- Language: Spanish
- Subject: Miguel Littín
- Publication place: Chile
- ISBN: 0-8050-0322-3

Clandestine in Chile: The Adventures of Miguel Littín (Spanish: La aventura de Miguel Littín clandestino en Chile) is a report, written by Gabriel García Márquez, about the Chilean filmmaker Miguel Littín’s clandestine visit to his home country after 12 years in exile.

The book was written based on 18 hours of recorded interviews by García Márquez with Miguel Littin in 1986.

== Summary ==
After ten years of dictatorship, Augusto Pinochet issued a list with the names of exiles allowed to return to Chile. Miguel Littín was not included in this list; instead, he found his name in another list of those who were banned from visiting Chile. Littín decided to return to his beloved country anyway by using a false passport, a false career background, a false excuse, and even a false wife.

During his visit Miguel, disguised as a Uruguayan businessman, directs three European film crews shooting a documentary about Chilean life under the dictatorship. He shoots interviews with ordinary Chileans and people of organized resistance movements who operate underground. He obtains an interview with a resistance leader, being led blindfolded to a clandestine hospital where the leader was taken after being rescued from a public hospital a few hours after he survived an assassination attempt by Pinochet’s secret police.

He succeeds in his mission and leaves Chile at the moment when the Chilean authorities have almost discovered his presence in the country. The revelations made in his documentary, Acta General de Chile, are supposed to embarrass the dictatorship by showing its brutality from first hand and all the underground network of young people working to overthrow the dictatorship.

== Censorship ==
On November 28, 1986, the customs authorities seized almost 15,000 copies of García Márquez's book Clandestine in Chile, which were later burned by military authorities in Valparaíso. Together with them, copies of a book of essays by Venezuelan presidential candidate Teodoro Petkoff were also burned.

== Editions in print ==
- ISBN 0-8050-0322-3, Hardcover, Henry Holt & Company, 1987
- ISBN 1590173406, Paperback, New York Review of Books, 2010
