= Nobody Knows I'm Here =

2020 film

- Film poster
- Spanish: Nadie Sabe Que Estoy Aquí
- Directed by: Gaspar Antillo
- Produced by: Juan de Dios Larraín; Pablo Larraín
- Starring: Jorge Garcia; Millaray Lobos; Nelson Brodt; Juan Falcón; Julio Fuentes
- Production company: Fábula
- Distributed by: Netflix
- Release date: June 24, 2020
- Running time: 100 minutes
- Country: Chile
- Language: Spanish

Nobody Knows I'm Here (Spanish: Nadie sabe que estoy aquí) is a 2020 Chilean drama film directed by Gaspar Antillo and starring Jorge Garcia, Millaray Lobos, Luis Gnecco, Alejandro Goic and Gastón Pauls. It is Netflix's first Chilean original movie.

== Plot ==
Memo Garrido lives with his uncle Braulio on a small verdant island in Llanquihue, a southeastern Chilean town. Despite living a peaceful life, Memo is haunted by traumatic childhood memories. He speaks very little, which sparks the interest of a local young woman named Marta. Over time, they become friends, and Memo reveals his biggest secret to her - that he was briefly famous as a singer. Throughout the film, we see Memo alone, dressed in a crimson glitter-studded cape, pretending to perform as if he were on stage. This fantasy reveals his desire to have made it as a famous singer.

As a child, Memo lived in Miami and his father, Jacinto, landed him a contract with a music producer. However, Jacinto decided that Memo's appearance was not enough to make him famous, so he made him a ghost singer for another young boy named Ángelo. Ángelo eventually became famous for the song "Nobody Knows I'm Here," which the studio had originally recorded for Memo. Angry at Ángelo for the "fraud," Memo attacked him after a performance, seriously injuring him and causing him to use a wheelchair. Memo became a recluse, living and working on his uncle's farm, while his father lost all his money promoting his son's ghost singer act.

Twenty-five years later, a candid YouTube video of Memo singing at his home, posted by Marta and a friend, leads to his father and Marta encouraging him to come out as the true singer. This lands Memo a spot on the television show "Face to Face" with Ángelo, who is now a motivational speaker promoting his book. During the reunion, Ángelo apologizes to Memo publicly, but never admits that Memo was the true singer. Memo leaves the stage angry, but after the show goes off air, he picks up the mic and sings the song live and beautifully, proving that he was the voice all along. However, it is unclear whether Memo's truth ever came to light since the performance was off-air, and the viewer even wonders if Memo truly sang the full song. Memo drops the microphone and exits the studio, doing a little dance move as he leaves.

Later, Marta crawls into bed with Memo, and the scene fades out to music with a fine crimson light on them as they warmly spoon together.

== Cast ==
- Jorge Garcia as Memo Garrido, a failed singer who had a traumatic experience with fame in his childhood.
- Millaray Lobos as Marta, a Llanquihue local who becomes acquainted with Memo.
- Luis Gnecco as Braulio Garrido, Memo's uncle with whom he lives and who takes care of him.
- Alejandro Goic as Jacinto Garrido, Memo's father, with whom he has an estranged relationship.
- Gastón Pauls as Angelo, ghost singer for Memo
- Eduardo Paxeco as Samuel
- Nelson Brodt as Sergio
- Juan Falcón as Animador
- Julio Fuentes as Invitado
- María Paz Grandjean as Francisca
- Solange Lackington as Productora
- Roberto Vander as Productora Miami

== Release ==
Nobody Knows I'm Here was originally set to premiere at the Tribeca Film Festival, where Chilean director Gaspar Antillo won in the Best New Narrative Director category. However, the festival was postponed due to the COVID-19 pandemic. The film was released globally on Netflix on June 24, 2020.

== Reception ==
The film was positively received by critics, who have praised its earnestness and simplicity, Jorge García's performance, and its narrative structure.
