= Three Sad Tigers =

1968 film

- film poster
- Directed by: Raúl Ruiz
- Written by: Raúl Ruiz
- Based on: Tres tristes tigres by Alejandro Sieveking
- Starring: Shenda Román
- Cinematography: Diego Bonacina
- Edited by: Carlos Piaggio
- Release date: 1968
- Running time: 100 minutes
- Country: Chile
- Language: Spanish

Three Sad Tigers (Spanish: Tres tristes tigres) is a 1968 Chilean drama film directed by Raúl Ruiz. It is an adaptation of the play of the same name by Alejandro Sieveking, which itself was based on the novel Tres tristes tigres by Cuban writer Guillermo Cabrera Infante. It shared the Golden Leopard award at the Locarno International Film Festival in 1969.

== Plot ==
The film follows several lower-middle-class, thirtysomething characters in Santiago, Chile.

Tito has moved to Santiago in search of a better life and works as a car salesman. However, he is unhappy due to the constant pressure and scrutiny he faces from his boss, Rudy. One weekend, when Tito is supposed to hand over the paperwork to close a car deal, he meets up with his sister Amanda and a stranger named Lucho. During a drunken dinner, they engage in a conversation about utopianism and encounter several interesting characters. However, their discussion almost leads to a fight with a group of young men from a neighboring table who are singing patriotic songs.

After losing the paperwork, Tito takes Amanda, who is working as a stripper and prostitute, to Rudy, intending to offer her to him in exchange for keeping his job. However, Rudy is angered when he learns of Tito's plan and the lost documents. When Rudy orders Tito to pick up his sister, Tito loses control of his anger and brutally assaults Rudy. The siblings then transport Rudy to a hospital by taxi and leave him lying at the entrance. The next morning, Tito broods alone in a café while listening to a bolero sung by Ramón Aguilera, before walking out listlessly into a busy city street.

== Cast ==
- Shenda Román as Amanda
- Nelson Villagra as Tito
- Luis Alarcón as Lucho
- Jaime Vadell as Rudy
- Delfina Guzmán as Alicia
- Fernando Colina as Carlos Sanhueza
- Belén Allasio as Chonchi
- Alonso Venegas as The School Inspector
