= Caliche sangriento =

- film poster
- Directed by: Helvio Soto
- Written by: Helvio Soto
- Produced by: Alajendro Villaseca
- Starring: Hector Duvauchelle, Jaime Vadell, Jorge Yáñez, Jorge Guerra (actor), Patricia Guzman
- Music by: Tito Lederman
- Release date: 27 October 1969 (Chile)
- Running time: 120 minute
- Language: Spanish

Caliche sangriento (i.e. Bloody Nitrate) is a Chilean movie of 1969 and the first one directed by Helvio Soto. The plot takes place in 1879 through 1880 during the War of the Pacific, when Chile, Bolivia and Peru fought over control of the sodium nitrate deposits in the Atacama Desert. The film decries the cruelty and absurdity of war and the disunity among the peoples of Latin America. The style of the movie has been compared to that of Western and Spaghetti Western movies.

== Plot ==
A group of 17 Chilean soldiers is marching through the baking hot desert, led by a captain who demands rigid discipline. One at a time, the men fall victim to the overwhelming drudgery and engagements with irregular troops.

== Release ==
The film was initially rejected by the Chilean Censorship Board but was later passed after it was cut by the producer, without consulting Soto, to remove:

- a credit thanking the army for their collaboration and advice
- an announcement at the end of the film stating that 25,000 soldiers died so that foreign economic interests could take over the nitrate fields.

The Censorship Board also added a disclaimer to the ratings card that appeared before showings to state: "Approval of this film does not imply acceptance of the facts as depicted therein or their fidelity, nor does it imply agreement with their interpretation of historical events."
