= Ayúdeme usted compadre =

1968 film

Ayúdeme Ud. Compadre
- film poster
- Directed by: Germán Becker
- Written by: Germán Becker
- Cinematography: Andrés Martorell
- Release date: 1968
- Running time: 115 minutes
- Country: Chile
- Language: Spanish

Ayúdeme usted compadre is a 1968 Chilean musical film directed by Germán Becker. It was entered into the 6th Moscow International Film Festival.

== Cast ==
- Los Perlas as Themselves
- Los Huasos Quincheros as Themselves
- Los Gatos as Themselves
- Pedro Messone as himself
- Fresia Soto as herself
- Gloria Simonetti
- Sérgio Livingstone as himself
- Mario Kreutzberger
