= Aldo Francia =

Chilean filmmaker

- Born: 1923; Valparaíso
- Died: 1996 (aged 72–73)
- Occupation: Film director

Aldo Francia (1923–1996) was a Chilean filmmaker.

== Filmography ==
- Valparaíso mi amor (1969)
- Ya no basta con rezar (1973)
