= Valparaíso, mi amor =

- Chilean theatrical release poster
- Directed by: Aldo Francia
- Cinematography: Diego Bonacina
- Edited by: Carlos Piaggio
- Music by: Gustavo Becerra
- Release date: 1969
- Running time: 90 minutes
- Country: Chile
- Language: Spanish

Valparaíso, mi amor ("Valparaíso, My Love") is a 1969 Chilean social realist drama film directed by Aldo Francia.

== Plot ==
This film depicts the story of four siblings who become semi-abandoned under the care of their stepmother after their father, an unemployed butcher, is jailed for stealing a cow and slaughtering it to feed his family. Left to fend for themselves, the children confront the harsh reality of poverty in the hills of Valparaíso in the 1960s. This compels them to find their own means of survival. As the movie progresses, we witness the characters' evolution, including the death of one child, the girl's descent into prostitution, and the other two siblings turning to delinquency.
