= Miguel Littin =

Chilean film director

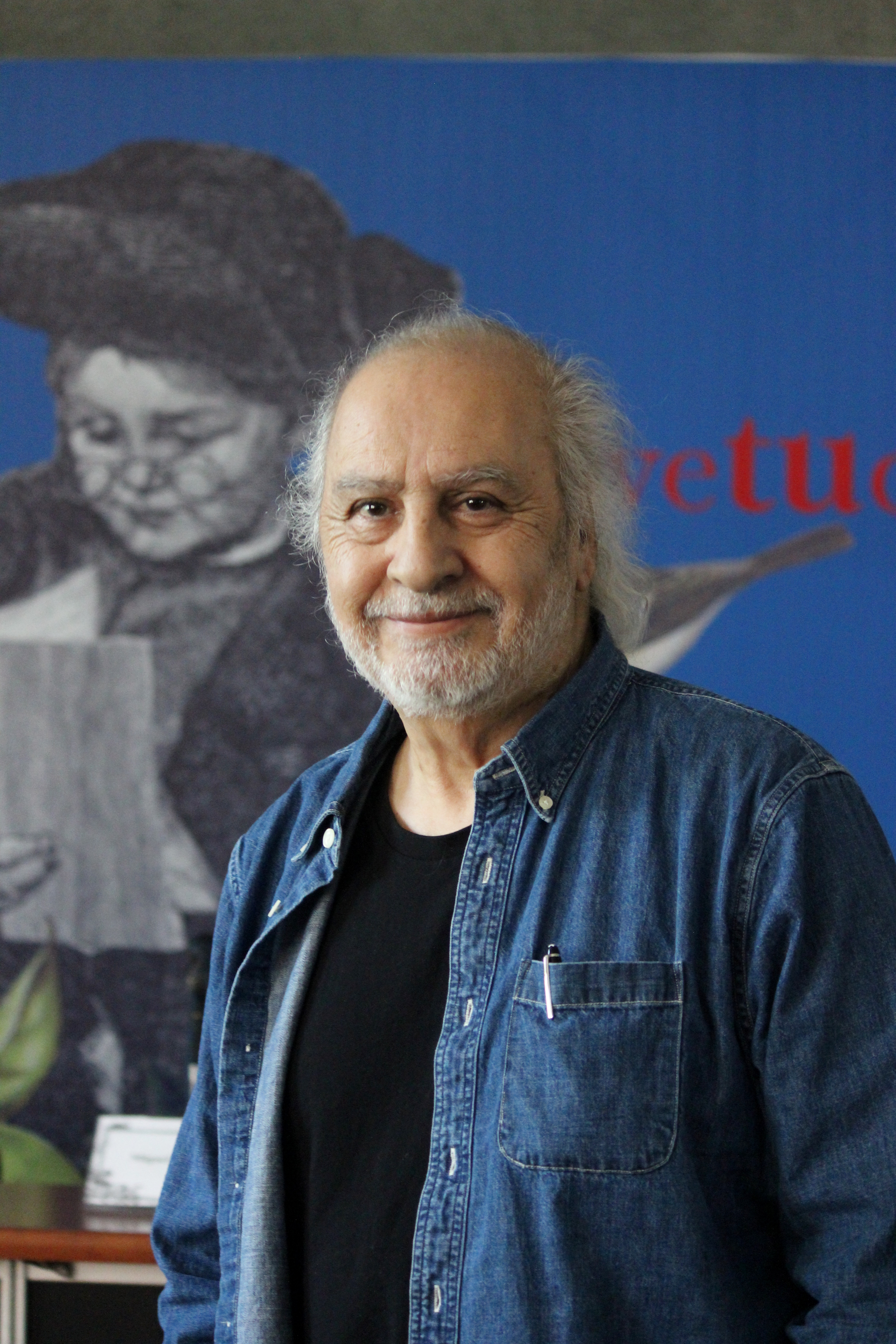
- Miguel Littin in 2018

Member of the Constitutional Council
- In office 7 June 2023 – 7 November 2023
- Constituency: O'Higgins Region (8th)

Personal details
- Born: 9 August 1942 (age 84) Palmilla, Chile
- Spouse: Elizabeth Menz
- Children: Three
- Chevalier of Arts and Letters of France, Legion of Honor. Aguila Azteca Condecoration, Mexico. Golden Medal of the Italian Senate. Human Rights Prize, Spain. Two-time Oscar Academy Award-nominated. Two-time Palm d'Or Nominated, Cannes Film Festival. Fipresci winner, Venice Film Festival. Golden Medal, Moscow Film Festival. Occic prize Berlin Film Festival. Prize Ciudad de San Sebastian, Spain.

Miguel Ernesto Littin Cucumides (born 9 August 1942) is a Chilean film director, screenwriter, film producer and novelist.

== Early life ==
Miguel Ernesto Littin Cucumides was born in Palmilla, Colchagua, Chile. He is half-Palestinian half-Greek.

== Career ==
Miguel Littin directed El Chacal de Nahueltoro (1969), becoming a major figure of the New Latin American Cinema.

Littin was exiled in Mexico shortly after Augusto Pinochet came to power in a military coup, which ousted President Salvador Allende, on September 11, 1973. His 1973 film The Promised Land was entered into the Cannes Film Festival, New York Film Festival, and the 8th Moscow International Film Festival.

In Mexico, he directed several films:

- Letters from Marusia, based on a miners strike in Chile. Letters from Marusia was nominated for the Academy Award for Best International Feature Film. Winner of 9 Ariel awards, including Best Director, Best Script, and Best Film from the Mexican Film Academy. The Italian actor Gian Maria Volonté played the lead character, and Mikis Theodorakis composed the original music for the film.
- El Recurso del Método (Long Live the President) based on Alejo Carpentier's novel El Recurso del método (Reasons of State); a co-production with Mexico, France and Cuba. Cannes Film Festival Official Competition. Produced by Costa Gavras and Michéle Ray.
- The Widow of Montiel, with Geraldine Chaplin, based on a Gabriel García Márquez short story. Berlin Film Festival Official Competition.

He then went to Nicaragua to make Alsino and the Condor, based on the novel Alsino by Pedro Prado. Dean Stockwell played a supporting character. The film won multiple awards around the globe and was nominated for the Academy Award for Best International Feature Film. In 1981, he was a member of the jury at the 12th Moscow International Film Festival.

After moving to Spain in 1984, Littin decided to enter Chile clandestinely to make a documentary, "Acta General de Chile" that showed the condition of the country under the Pinochet regime. It was made the subject of Nobel Laureate Gabriel García Márquez's book Clandestine in Chile: The Adventures of Miguel Littin. This book chronicles his incognito escapades in Chile as he exposes the regime. His four-hour Documentary, "Acta General de Chile," was a big success around the world and won three top prizes at the Venice Film Festival, Fipresci, Spacio Libre del Autore, and the Golden Medal of the Italian Senate.

In 1989-90, he made "Sandino" a spectacular European coproduction with Kris Kristofferson, Dean Stockwell, Angela Molina, and Joaquin de Almeida in the lead characters.

He eventually returned to Chile where he continued to make films, among them Tierra del Fuego, based on the adventures of explorer Julius Popper; Cannes Film Festival Official Selection and Dawson, Isla 10, about a group of political prisoners sent to Dawson's Island during Pinochet's regime. Rome Film Festival Official Competition.

Miguel Littin was the mayor of his hometown in the central valley, Palmilla, from 1992 to 1994 and was re-elected for the period 1996–2000.

His films Actas de Marusia and Alsino and the Condor were nominated by the Academy of Motion Picture Arts and Sciences for Best Film in a Foreign Language. Alsino and the Condor won the Golden Prize at the 13th Moscow International Film Festival.

His 2005 film The Last Moon was entered into the Seattle Film Festival, L.A. Film Festival,27th Moscow International Film Festival.

== Filmography ==
- 1969: El Chacal de Nahueltoro (Jackal of Nahueltoro)
- 1971: Compañero Presidente (Documentary)
- 1973: La Tierra Prometida (The Promised Land)
- 1974: Actas de Marusia (Letters from Marusia)
- 1978: El Recurso del método (Long Live the President)
- 1980: La Viuda de Montiel (The Widow of Montiel)
- 1981: Alsino y el Condor (Alsino and the Condor)
- 1986: Acta General de Chile (Documentary)
- 1990: Sandino
- 1994: Los náufragos
- 2000: Tierra del Fuego
- 2002: Los Caminos de la Ira; Cronicas Palestinas (Palestinian Chronicles) (Documentary)
- 2002: El Abanderado
- 2005: La Ultima Luna (The Last Moon)
- 2009: Dawson, Isla 10
- 2014: Allende en su Laberinto (Allende in his Maze)
