= Dog's Dialogue =

- Film poster
- Directed by: Raúl Ruiz
- Written by: Raúl Ruiz; Nicole Muchnik
- Produced by: Hubert Niogret
- Starring: Eva Simonet
- Cinematography: Denis Lenoir
- Edited by: Valeria Sarmiento
- Music by: Jorge Arriagada
- Release date: 1977
- Running time: 22 minutes
- Country: France
- Language: French

Dog's Dialogue (French: Colloque de chiens) is a 1977 French surrealist short crime film directed by Chilean filmmaker Raúl Ruiz. The film contains popular conventions of the photo-romance but also can be viewed as a parody of the Brazilian telenovela or melodrama and pop culture stereotypes.

The story, told almost entirely in still images, revolves around a young girl who is told her mother is not her real mother. The girl leaves her small town, grows into a beautiful woman, and starts searching for love and fulfillment in undesirable places. The story is narrated off-screen, and the stills are intercut with film footage of a city landscape and dogs barking. The film deals with topics of gender, sexuality, murder, prostitution, and gender/identity alterations. The motifs of gender subversion, still images, and dispersed bodies are seen in this film along with many other of Ruiz's films. A main subject of this film is the relationship between stillness and movement and the repetitions of images, gestures and statements that are ironic yet believable.

The film stars Eva Simonet and Silke Humel and is narrated by Robert Darmel in the French version and Michael Graham in the English version.

Ruiz made the film while taking a hiatus from making The Suspended Vocation (1978) during an actors' strike.

The film won a César Award even though it was not seen by a wide audience.

== Plot ==
The film opens with a shot of an abandoned dog tied to a piece of broken furniture in a large open field. The dog is barked at and circled by another unleashed dog. The dogs continue to bark at each other while the unleashed dog runs in and out of frame while repeatedly approaching the leashed dog. The film transitions to still images and begins the narrative that is told entirely through the voice of a narrator (Robert Darmel). The narrative begins with little girls at a school playground. One young girl, Monique (Silke Humel), is told by another that the woman she thinks is her mother is in fact not her mother. Monique goes home to Madame Duvivier who she thinks is her mother to discuss this new information. Madame Duvivier confirms that she is not Monique's mother and explains to Monique that her mother is Marie, a woman who comes by often to visit. Monique then goes to talk to Marie angrily, and discovers that Marie doesn't know who Monique's father is.

The film then transitions into Monique's adult life, which is ruled by sex and domination. She has been with many men, which was a trend that began when she became sexually intimate with one of her patients at a hospital. There is then a transition to Christmas Eve 1966. Monique goes out to a bar with her friend and is asked to dance by a rich man. After having some drinks, he drives her home. She sees this man for months because he financially supports her. Monique, haunted by her upbringing, eventually resorts to prostitution.

There is an insert of footage of tied up dogs barking in the streets. Returning to Monique's story; she has a television repairman, Henri (Eva Simonet), come over to her home to fix her TV. Henri is someone she remembers from her childhood. They talk for a while and reminisce about their hometown as she begins to feel attracted to him. He too falls in love with her. As they interact, the sound of barking dogs can be heard.

Time passes, and Henri and Monique are in a relationship and she fulfills her dreams of running the Joli Mont cafe, with the help of Henri. Monique is visited by her old friend Alice (Marie Christine Poisot), who threatens to reveal Monique's past if she doesn't receive money and a place to stay from Monique. Monique provides Alice with what to had requested. With the sound of dogs barking in the background, Alice begins to feel attracted to Henri. Henri too, falls in love with her. Monique forgives him for being disloyal. One day at a park while Henri and Alice play ball, Monique kills herself and her three-year-old son.

Over an insert of barking dogs behind a gate, the narrator reveals that Henri marries Alice. Later discovering Alice is more similar to Monique than he thought, he seeks revenge and kills Alice. He chops up her body and buries each individual body part.

Another break from still images comes an insert of a city street scene with cars and people passing by. After getting involved in illegal work, Henri gets put in jail. Repeating a similar scene from earlier in the film, a sick man in prison calls for Henri's help and they become sexually involved. After being released he becomes a suspect in the murder of Alice. There is then another insert of city street scenes. Returning to still images, Henri undergoes a sex change to disguise himself. On Christmas Eve 1974, Henri, now Odile, has some drinks with an old wealthy man. She then becomes a prostitute as Monique once did. She goes back to her old town and becomes the owner of a bar. She then adopts an orphaned boy named Luigi. After work one night a man enters her home and kills her by hitting her over the head with a glass bottle as Henri did to Alice.

The film transitions into the final scene, which takes place at the same playground the film started with. During the transition, there is the sound of barking dogs. In this final scene, Luigi is told by kids on the playground that his mother was killed by her lover, but he responds by telling them that they are wrong because the woman they think is his mother is not his mother.

== Cast ==
- Eva Simonet as Henri
- Robert Darmel (voice)
- Silke Humel as Monique
- Frank Lesne
- Marie Christine Poisot as Alice
- Hugo Santiago
- Genevieve Such
- Laurence Such
- Michel Such
- Pierre Olivier Such
- Yves Wecker

== Production ==
Dog's Dialogue utilized 35mm film in color and had a 22-minute runtime. It was made in-between two films Ruiz made with Pierre Klossowski, The Suspended Vocation and The Hypothesis of the Stolen Painting (1978). There was an actor's strike during the making of The Suspended Vocation, which put a pause on the production and allowed Ruiz the time to make Dog's Dialogue. The film consists of almost entirely still images with the exception of a few moments of footage of dogs barking in various locations and French city streets and neighborhoods. This gives the film an ethnographic quality. The film consists of multiple shifting points of view throughout the narrative, along with a distance between the characters and the narrator.

Ruiz uses the tools of repetition and representation in this film to give the images significance and life. The narrative repeats many key lines and gestures at different points in the story and for different characters. The plot seems to circulate; repeating itself just under different circumstances. As the film develops it focuses more on stereotypical gestures and creates discrepancies between what is being seen and what is being heard. For example, the same image of Henri and Alice is used to portray romance and then later murder. In this way, he creates a dissociation between the plot and images. Repetition is also used as a form of comedic affect. Notably when both Monique and Henri at different points in the story have sex with an ill patient. The use of repetition and bluntness turns a dark topic into comedic relief. Ruiz always includes academic aspects into his films therefore making all the form and content intentional rather than random, despite his confusing experimental tendencies. Within this film, he creates a deliberate naivety for the narrator, emphasizing the ridiculous rhetoric that has become matter of fact for the characters. The movement of the plot also behaves casually, moving from Monique as a child to an adult without any ellipsis or cohesive transition. It also ignores the lack of motivation for Henri to kill Alice and continues to lackadaisically move along to the next questionable plot point.

== Genre ==
Ruiz's films are always difficult to label as a specific genre. Dog's Dialogue borrows styles of photo-romance. It can also be considered a parody of the melodrama. It reveals the melodrama genre as a formal mechanism by reducing the film's characters and plot to the status of necessary props. The lack of individuality Ruiz gives to his characters demonstrates his criticism of the homogeneity of melodrama. With his use of stereotypes, common gestures and repetition of these cliches, the film became a form of abstraction. This film also makes a critique on the conventions used in Chris Marker's La Jetée (1962). It reveals La Jetée for using the photo-romance stereotypes. Dog's Dialogue makes use of so many genres, narrative styles, and media formats that it is hard to categorize it under one genre.

== Motifs ==
There are many conventions seen in Dog's Dialogue that can be seen again and again throughout Ruiz's body of work. In this film, Henri undergoes gender subversion which is a motif that can be seen in his other films such as Three Crowns of the Sailor (1983). This film also reveals Ruiz's absurd attraction to corpses and dispersed bodies. This is seen when Henri murders Alice and separates her body into many pieces. Corpses can be seen in Ruiz films more often than not, notably in The Territory (1981), Treasure Island (1985), Three Lives and Only One Death (1996), Genealogies of a Crime (1997) and Shattered Image (1998). Another obsession of Ruiz's consists of gestures, stereotypes, and still images. These conventions are heavily used in this film and bear similarities to his recurring use of tableaux vivants in films such as The Hypothesis of the Stolen Painting and Genealogies of a Crime.

== Analysis ==
The most significant metaphor that is carried throughout this film is the leashed and caged barking dogs, from which the film gets its title. The shots of dogs barking in various locations serve different effects and meanings in the film. Not only does it provide a break from the swift moving and ridiculous narrative, giving spectators a moment of sanity, but it also serves as a commentary on the absurd lives of the characters. The barking dogs can symbolize animals recounting the stories of their masters. They can also symbolize the dialogue of the characters themselves. The characters are always striving for attention and affection and their ridiculous rhetoric is just a bunch of useless noise, such as the barking of dogs. The dogs are a metaphor for not only constant conflict and the internal expression of the characters but also the characters' constant attempts and need to reach out to each other and connect to one another. They want to fix their loneliness but they do so in dramatic ways. The dogs' barking exemplifies their continued failed attempts to scream for attention and affection, that only results in the generation of noise.

Another major metaphor in the film is the use of still images. The lack of moving footage is Ruiz's way of deconstructing performance, while making a critique on conventional melodramas. The repetition of these still images demonstrates the entrapment of the characters in their unfortunate existences. They are confined within the parameters of their own repeated mistakes and failures. The still images also serve as a form of self-reflexivity for cinema itself. It sheds light on the fact that films are not really moving at all but are actually composed of still images that move at a much quicker rate than those in Dog's Dialogue. Ruiz demonstrates that cinema is photographic. A major subject in the film is the difference between stillness and movement itself and how although the gestures are repeated they still have an initial believable quality.

== Reception and legacy ==
The film was released in France in 1977, and then in the US on November 13, 1987 in New York, New York, and finally in Argentina on March 29, 2009 at the Buenos Aires International Festival of Independent Cinema. The production companies for the film included Filmoblic and L’office de la Creation cinematographique. The comedic short film got relatively positive reviews. The most common critique was that it wasn’t an accurate representation of his later and more mature work but it did provide a successfully humorous commentary on melodrama.

=== Awards ===
Dog's Dialogue won a César Award in France for Best Fiction Short Film (Meilleur court-métrage de fiction).
