= The Blind Owl (film) =

- Film image
- Directed by: Raúl Ruiz
- Written by: Benoît Peeters; Raúl Ruiz
- Based on: The Blind Owl by Sadegh Hedayat
- Produced by: Maison de la Culture Le Havre
- Starring: Jean-François Lapalus; Jessica Forde; Jean-Bernard Guillard
- Cinematography: Patrice Cologne
- Edited by: Valeria Sarmiento; Rudolfo Wedeles
- Music by: Jorge Arriagada
- Release date: 1987
- Running time: 105 minutes
- Countries: France; Switzerland
- Languages: French; Spanish; Arabic

The Blind Owl (French: La chouette aveugle) is a 1987 French drama film directed by Chilean filmmaker Raúl Ruiz. It is an oneiric, metafictional work with some scenes and characters loosely based on the 1937 book The Blind Owl by the Persian writer Sadegh Hedayat.
