= City of Pirates =

1983 French avant-garde surrealist dark fantasy film

- Promotional release poster
- Directed by: Raúl Ruiz
- Written by: Raúl Ruiz
- Produced by: Paulo Branco
- Starring: Hugues Quester; Anne Alvaro; Melvil Poupaud
- Cinematography: Acácio de Almeida
- Edited by: Valeria Sarmiento
- Music by: Jorge Arriagada
- Distributed by: Gerick Distribution
- Release date: September 1983
- Running time: 108 minutes
- Country: France
- Language: French

City of Pirates (French: La Ville des Pirates) is a 1983 French experimental surrealist dark fantasy film directed by Raúl Ruiz. Made during Ruiz's most prolific period of filmmaking in exile and shortly after his first return to Chile since the 1973 military coup, the film stars a primarily French cast including Hugues Quester, Anne Alvaro and Melvil Poupaud. It was filmed in Portugal over a period of three weeks.

Ruiz used a process of automatic writing to write his screenplay during the shoot. Academic Michael Goddard notes that "Ruiz would write the script each day immediately after the siesta; hence, in effect, dream the script rather than writing it." As a result, the film is heavily influenced by conceptions of dreams and their relationship to storytelling and the visual. The film is generally considered to be one of Ruiz's best works and exemplifies several recurring themes and motifs of the director's style, including neo-Baroque narrative and cinematography, depth of field, childhood, navigation, dreams, and schizophrenia.

== Plot ==
City of Pirates follows a disconsolate young woman called Isidore through multiple episodes of seemingly disconnected events and narrative points that, in themselves, operate with an allegorical and dreamlike logic. The film begins with the text-card stating "Overseas Territories, one week before the end of the war", something that is not referred to again in the film. The "pirates" and "city" of the title do not appear. This initiates a common theme in which narrative events are set up and never fully followed through to a traditional conclusion. Isidore initially works for her "father" and "mother" who give her commands and boss her around like a maid. Having considered suicide, she encounters a number of different characters, most notably a psychopathic young boy named Malo, who claims to have raped and murdered his own family and subsequently proposes to Isidore, and a social outcast named Toby who spends his time in a castle on an abandoned island, arguing with the internal voices of his mother, sister, and a number of members of his extended family.

== Cast ==
- Hugues Quester as Toby
- Anne Alvaro as Isidore
- Melvil Poupaud as Malo, The Boy
- André Engel as The Fisherman
- Duarte de Almeida as The Father
- Clarisse Dole as The Mother
- André Gomes as The Policeman

== Production ==
=== Writing and style ===
Michael Goddard argues that the film is a distinct example of the particular trademarks that comprise Ruiz's signature style, using a process akin to bricolage to construct a unique cinematic experience. He writes that "to describe a film as Ruizian is more or less the equivalent of evoking City of Pirates as perhaps the most poetic and hypnotic point of Ruiz's entire career."

City of Pirates has been described as an oneiric, surrealist film due in large part to its incorporation of surrealist hallmarks such as the "trust in ecstasy, scandal, the call of the wild, mystification, prophetic dreams, humour, the uncanny." However, Goddard argues that the film rather makes "use of particular surrealist procedures for the specific purpose of destabilising normative narrative forms and opening up cinematic potentials beyond the telling of a single, organic story, knowable in its entirety." As opposed to being entirely surrealistic, City of Pirates freely incorporates and associates with this style in a broader approach to filmmaking that can be more easily categorized as neo-Baroque; its use of allegory, mythology, and the disjuncture of perceived space and occupied space (by both the camera and the characters as well as the spectators themselves) all point to this.

=== Filming ===
The film was shot in Portugal over a period of three weeks.

Ruiz incorporates a number of cinematic techniques to craft the look of the film. Some of the most prominent are the experimental use of filters, a split-focus diopter, under- and oversaturation of the film stock, the superimposition of shots, extended camera movements and awkward and unnatural camera angles that "are only possible cinematically... but that nevertheless generate their own consistent reality."

The film is also notable as the debut of the 10-year-old Poupaud as a perverse, murderous boy inspired by Peter Pan, Jean Vigo's Zéro de conduite (1933), Antoine de Saint-Exupéry's The Little Prince (1943) and Jean Genet's essay "The Criminal Child" (1949). Poupaud went on to act in another ten Ruiz films over the next thirty years. In a March 2016 Lincoln Center masterclass, Poupaud said of the shoot that, "Raúl Ruiz told me that I was Pinocchio and Pinochet at the same time."

== Release ==
City of Pirates was screened to an international audience at the New York Film Festival in 1985.

=== Critical reception ===
The praise and reception of Ruiz's City of Pirates fell short of his previous film Three Crowns of the Sailor (1983) which had garnered him respect in the international film community and considerable box office in France. Much of the praise for City of Pirates was given retrospectively, not upon its initial release. For instance, Paul Hammond wrote of the film in 1985 that "If Ruiz's film palls in its compulsive retreading of trod ground, in its insistent miracle-working, it is because such desiring fictions are by definition interminable, and autonomous."

Dave Kehr of the Chicago Reader called the film "seductive" and "confounding", writing: "It's useless to describe the plot, which flows with perfect dream logic from one mysterious episode to the next". Dennis Schwartz of Ozus' World Movie Reviews gave the film a grade of "B+", and referred to it as "hypnotic, seductive and unique, but it was too confounding for me to feel comfortable with something that follows only dream logic." He also wrote that, "[o]f note, there is no city or pirates."

== Home media ==
In 2001, City of Pirates was released on DVD in the PAL region by Gemini Films.
