= Life Is a Dream (1986 film) =

Life is a Dream
- Film poster
- Directed by: Raúl Ruiz
- Written by: Raúl Ruiz (based on Pedro Calderón de la Barca)
- Produced by: Jean-Luc Larguier
- Starring: Sylvain Thirolle
- Cinematography: Jacques Bouquin
- Edited by: Martine Bouquin; Rudolfo Wedeles
- Music by: Jorge Arriagada
- Release date: 1986
- Running time: 103 minutes
- Country: France
- Language: French

Life is a Dream (French: Mémoire des apparences) is a 1986 French surrealist art film written and directed by Chilean filmmaker Raúl Ruiz. It is an oneiric, metafictional, "neo-Baroque" work about the Chilean dictatorship, exile, dream, cinema and mnemonics. It was inspired by Frances A. Yates' book The Art of Memory (1966) and features characters and scenes from Life Is a Dream (1635), a Spanish Golden Age play Ruiz had directed at the Avignon Festival in 1986, in addition to pastiches of B-movies and serials of the 1930s and 1940s.

== Cast ==
- Sylvain Thirolle as Ignacio Vega
- Roch Leibovici
- Bénédicte Sire as Astrea
- Laurence Cortadellas
- Jean-Bernard Guillard as Prince Segismundo
- Jean-Pierre Agazar
- Alain Halle-Halle
- Jean-François Lapalus
- Alain Rimoux
