= Litoral (miniseries) =

- Written by: Raúl Ruiz
- Directed by: Raúl Ruiz
- Theme music composer: Jorge Arriagada
- Country of origin: Chile
- Original language: Spanish
- No. of episodes: 4

Production
- Cinematography: Jorge Aguilar
- Editor: Valeria Sarmiento
- Running time: 240 minutes

Original release
- Release: 2008

Litoral is a four-part 2008 Chilean TV miniseries written and directed by Raúl Ruiz. Originally subtitled "Tales of the Sea", it is thematically similar to the director's film Three Crowns of the Sailor (1982) and is the second of the oneiric folklore-themed miniseries' he made for TVN, following on from La Recta Provincia (2007).

== Cast ==
- Santiago Meneghello
- Daniel Kiblisky
- Francisca Walker
- Héctor Aguilar
- Ignacio Agüero
- Jorge Becker
- Bélgica Castro
- Roberto Cobian
- Marcial Edwards
- Carlos Flores del Pino
- Cristián Gajardo
- Pablo Krögh
- Sandro Larenas
- Francisco Medina
- Hugo Medina
- Juan Pablo Miranda
- Mario Montilles
- Eugenio Morales
- Valentina Muhr
- Javiera Parra
- Hernán Vallejo
- Pedro Vicuña
