= The Tango of the Widower and Its Distorting Mirror =

- Film poster
- Spanish: El tango del viudo y su espejo deformante
- Directed by: Raúl Ruiz (1967) and Valeria Sarmiento (2020)
- Written by: Ruiz (1967) and Omar Saavedra Santis (2020)
- Cinematography: Diego Bonacina
- Edited by: Carlos Piaggio
- Music by: Jorge Arriagada
- Production company: Poetastros
- Release date: 2020
- Running time: 70 minutes
- Country: Chile
- Language: Spanish

The Tango of the Widower and its Distorting Mirror (Spanish: El tango del viudo y su espejo deformante) is a Chilean film directed by Raúl Ruiz in 1967 and completed by his widow Valeria Sarmiento for a February 2020 premiere at the 70th Berlin International Film Festival.

== Cast ==
- Rubén Sotoconil
- Claudia Paz
- Luis Alarcón
- Shenda Román
- Delfina Guzmán
- Luis Vilches
- Sergio Hernández (voice only)
