= Le film à venir =

- Directed by: Raúl Ruiz
- Produced by: Silvia Voser
- Cinematography: Jacques Bouquin
- Edited by: Valeria Sarmiento
- Music by: Jorge Arriagada
- Release date: November 16, 1997
- Running time: 9 minutes
- Country: France
- Language: French

The Film to Come (French: Le film à venir) is a 1997 French short film directed by Raúl Ruiz. The story concerns a cult that continuously watches a 23-second long film in a neverending loop. The film has no dialogue; instead, an ever-changing narrator gives a first-person account of his experience with the cult.

== Plot ==
For the last seven years, a group of people who call themselves the Philokinetes have been ritualistically screening a 23-second long fragment of film called "The Film to Come". In the so-called "Room of Clocks," devotees watch the fragment over and over again in order to enter a hypnotic state in which there is no difference between film and reality.

The narrator encounters the Philokinetes in search of his missing daughter, who went missing during a screening. Upon having a vision of his daughter within the pages of the Philokinetes' sacred books, he falls into a deathlike fugue, understanding that he has become a part of the sacred film.

== Cast ==
- Féodor Atkine (voice)
- Jean-Yves Gauthier (voice)
- Hubert Saint-Macary (voice)
- Gérard Vincent
- Margot Marguerite
- Edouard Waintrop
- Abdelwaheb Meddeb
- Guy Scarpetta
- Bernard Pautrat
- Waldo Rojas

== Reception ==
Despite its limited release, Le film à venir drew some praise for its application of Ruiz's own theory of "shamanic cinema," in which he articulated the idea that film can be transformative in the same fashion as older forms of orally-transmitted culture.
