= La maleta =

1963 film

- Film poster
- Directed by: Raúl Ruiz
- Written by: Raúl Ruiz
- Produced by: Raúl Ruiz
- Starring: Gastón Duvauchelle; Héctor Duvauchelle; Orieta Escamez; Gonzalo Palta
- Cinematography: Enrique Urteaga
- Edited by: Inti Briones
- Music by: Jorge Arriagada
- Production company: Experimental Cinema of the University of Chile
- Distributed by: Experimental Cinema of the University of Chile
- Release date: 1963
- Running time: 20 minutes
- Country: Chile
- Language: Spanish

La Maleta (English: The Suitcase) is a 1963 Chilean experimental drama short film written and directed by Raúl Ruiz based on the Chilean play of the same name that originally premiered at the Petit Rex Theater in 1962 by theater director Víctor Jara. It was Ruiz's first film as a director and was produced, repurposed and distributed through the Experimental Cinema program of the University of Chile.

== Plot ==
The story revolves around a man who is traveling with a large suitcase on his back. Inside the suitcase, a smaller man is discovered who shares similar physical traits with the owner of the suitcase. As a result, the owner becomes physically exhausted from carrying the heavy suitcase, but the man inside helps relieve him of the burden.

== Cast ==
- Gastón Duvauchelle
- Héctor Duvauchelle
- Orieta Escámez
- Gonzalo Palta

== Production ==
The short was shot on 16mm film, and was intended by Ruiz to be a full-feature film with the help of fellow filmmaker Sergio Bravo. With Bravo backing out of the project and merely giving him 20 rolls of reversible 16mm film, Ruiz ran into much difficulty on producing the entire feature, and settled on a 20 minute short. Considered to be an unfinished short, the film was presumably lost for decades until in 2007 it was re-discovered within the University of Chile under the false category of "French film." The film was later re-edited through the permission of the university by Inti Briones, and music was added by Jorge Arriagada and officially premiered exclusively at the 2008 Valdivia Film Festival nearly 45 years after its initial production date. The film is now being preserved in the Cineteca of the University of Chile.

== Critical reception ==
Becoming a "diamond in the rough" after Ruiz's status as a film auteur was established, the film received positive reviews upon its release in 2008. In an article discussing Ruiz's many works, an online website called The Worldwide Celluloid Massacre labeled the film a "unique surreal and symbolic idea," as well as suggesting that the smaller man is a reflection of "possessions possess[ing] him as they take on a life of their own," putting the film in the category of "Of Some Interest."
