= The Lost Domain =

The Lost Domain may refer to:

- Le Grand Meaulnes, a novel by Alain-Fournier (one of several English translations of the title)
- The Lost Domain (film) (Le domaine perdu), a 2005 movie directed by Raoul Ruiz loosely based on the above novel
- Lost Domain, a 2014 album by Tim Wheeler
