= Genealogies of a Crime =

- Directed by: Raúl Ruiz
- Written by: Raúl Ruiz; Pascal Bonitzer
- Produced by: Paulo Branco
- Starring: Catherine Deneuve; Michel Piccoli; Melvil Poupaud; Andrzej Seweryn; Bernadette Lafont
- Cinematography: Stephan Ivanov
- Edited by: Valeria Sarmiento
- Music by: Jorge Arriagada
- Distributed by: Rézo Films (France); Leopardo Filmes (Portugal)
- Release dates: 26 March 1997 (France); 4 May 1997 (Portugal); 28 March 1998 (United States)
- Running time: 114 minutes (France); 113 minutes (Argentina); 103 minutes (USA)
- Countries: France; Portugal
- Language: French
- Budget: $4.2 million
- Box office: $1.2 million

Genealogies of a Crime (French: Généalogies d'un crime, Portuguese: Genealogias de um Crime) is a 1997 French-Portuguese crime film directed by Chilean filmmaker Raúl Ruiz. It was entered into the 47th Berlin International Film Festival where it won the Silver Bear for an outstanding artistic contribution. Despite being released in 1997 (1998 in the United States), the film was not released on DVD until 2005. Since, it has been included in multiple DVD anthologies of Ruiz’s works.

== Plot ==
During a stormy night, René (Melvil Poupaud) disposes of a knife, which is picked up by an unrevealed individual. The scene fades to a blank Go board and the narrator describes an ancient Chinese fable concerning a young man who kills a woman of the Liu Bao family, only to be killed after falling in love with her ghost.

Presumably later, Solange (Catherine Deneuve) is questioned by a lawyer. She begins recounting how she took on René’s case: Immediately after the death of her son, Pascal, Solange receives a call from her colleague Mathieu. Mathieu informs her that René is accused of murdering Jeanne (also played by Deneuve), his aunt and a member of the "Franco-Belgian Psychoanalytic Society" which René blames for the murder. Solange agrees, and at her son’s funeral she is introduced to Georges Didier (Michel Piccoli); the eccentric head of the Franco-Belgian Psychoanalytic Society. Georges’ behavior is immediately apparent as unusual, he is quick to anger and relies on a notebook to remember other people’s names. Later, Solange meets René, who claims to want to be her friend and convinces her to play a game involving role-reversal. During the game, Solange reveals that she is known for taking on hopeless cases, and has lost every single one. Solange travels to Jeanne’s former home and is accommodated by Esther (Bernadette Lafont), Jeanne’s former maid. Solange begins reading Jeanne’s diary and the film transitions to René’s adolescence.

From the onset, Jeanne notes that René displays "criminal" behavior. As a young child René exhibits violent and unusual behavior: he destroys several pieces of China and develops a fascination with knives. In his later years, Jeanne notes that he acts normal, but still has destructive tendencies and is possibly a kleptomaniac. Jeanne attempts to treat René by utilizing the role-reversal game he had played with Solange earlier in the film. Through the game, Jeanne learns that René has hidden all the items he has stolen around the estate. At some point in his young adulthood, René leaves the estate, and contacts Jeanne when he needs money. On a day when Jeanne is meeting with her colleague Georges, René asks Jeanne for money and she refuses. During her meeting, René is seen in the background, running from a crowd presumably after attempting to steal something. While this occurs, Jeanne is introduced to Christian Corrail ( Andrzej Seweryn), a fellow psychoanalyst and Georges’ personal nemesis. Four months before her murder, Jeanne catches Rene stealing her furniture with his friends. They engage in the same role-reversal game they’ve played several times before, and Jeanne in her anger shoots René in the arm, at which point René insists the game is over. That event is the last entry in her diary.

Back in present time, Solange leaves the estate and tells Mathieu her theory: Jeanne trained René to kill her, and therefore committed suicide. Later, Solange has dinner with her mother, Louise (Monique Melinand), who reveals that Solange also demonstrated sociopathic behavior as a child. During a visit with Georges afterwards, Louise dies of a heart attack. At the funeral, Solange is informed that René has attempted suicide. At the hospital, Solange encounters Georges, who is thrown out after creating a disturbance while attempting to locate and speak to René. Solange begins to suspect Georges and her suspicions are confirmed when she is invited to witness a tableau vivant style ceremony orchestrated by the Franco-Belgian Psychoanalytic Society. The ceremony recreates a painting and alternatively blindfolds the subject and the participants. Georges revealed that he used this experiment on René. Now awake, René claims that after this ceremony he awoke and panicked upon finding his aunt dead. Solange arranges her defense around this and René is acquitted. With their reputation tarnished, the Franco-Belgian Psychoanalytic Society commits mass suicide. René reappears soon after and begins a relationship with Solange. This relationship grows abusive, and one night Solange is driven by her own childhood tendencies and murders René and his friends. This is the conclusion of Solange’s statement to her lawyer, who has decided that Solange will plea insanity for the murder.

== Production ==
The film was written by Ruiz and Pascal Bonitzer, the star of The Suspended Vocation, one of Ruiz’s most notable works. Ruiz was inspired by the story of psychoanalyst Hermine Hug-Hellmuth, who is best known for her work with children and her murder at the hands of her own nephew, whom she treated as well. Ruiz himself felt that "it is perhaps she who, right to the end manipulated this man so he would kill her exactly as she dreamed". Ruiz is noted for having an interest in "shamanic cinema" and frequently explores dreams as a motif. Furthermore, Ruiz had developed an interest in multiple personality disorder after agreeing to work with Barbet Schroeder on the film that would become Three Lives and Only One Death. Music was done by Jorge Arriagada, who also had worked with Ruiz on many previous projects. Editing was done by Valeria Sarmiento, Ruiz’s wife and another long-time fellow collaborator. Also of note, Nobel Prize for Literature recipient Patrick Modiano appears in a small role as Pascal's father, a writer.

== Reception ==
Genealogies of a Crime opened on 52 screens in France and grossed $239,172 for the week, placing eleventh at the French box office. It had a very limited release in the U.S., and as a result only grossed $73,763 in the United States. It holds an 80% rating on Rotten Tomatoes, based on 5 reviews, with an average rating of 6.4/10. However, reviews have overall been mixed. Boxoffice gave it two stars, approving of the humorous dynamic between Georges and Christian, but citing the lack of suspense as a letdown. Variety’s Deborah Young felt that the humor was awkward, and panned its similarity to Ruiz’s earlier works, but conceded that "Still, there is a constant stream of good-natured, high-brow Euro humor to satisfy those who stay on board for the ride". Stephen Holden of the New York Times referred to Genealogies of a Crime as a "delightful metaphysical comedy" and enjoyed the distance created by the cast's "cool and assured" performances. The film was nominated for the Golden Berlin Bear and won the Silver Berlin Bear for Outstanding Artistic Contribution at the 1997 Berlin International Film Festival.

== Cast ==
- Catherine Deneuve as Jeanne/Solange
- Michel Piccoli as Georges Didier
- Melvil Poupaud as René
- Andrzej Seweryn as Christian
- Bernadette Lafont as Esther
- Monique Melinand as Louise
- Jean-Yves Gautier as Mathieu
- Mathieu Amalric as Yves
- Camila Mora as Soledad
- Patrick Modiano as Bob
- Brigitte Sy as Jeanne

== Awards ==
Year	Organization	Award	Category/Recipient	Result
1997	Berlin International Film Festival	Silver Berlin Bear	Outstanding Artistic Contribution	Won
1997	Berlin International Film Festival	Golden Berlin Bear	Golden Berlin Bear	Nominated
