= Night Across the Street =

2012 film

- Film poster
- Directed by: Raúl Ruiz
- Written by: Raúl Ruiz (based on Hernán del Solar)
- Produced by: Christian Aspee, François Margolin
- Starring: Christian Vadim
- Cinematography: Inti Briones
- Edited by: Raúl Ruiz, Valeria Sarmiento, Christian Aspee
- Music by: Jorge Arriagada
- Release dates: 19 May 2012 (Cannes); 21 August 2012 (Chile)
- Running time: 107 minutes
- Country: Chile
- Languages: Spanish; French

Night Across the Street (Spanish: La noche de enfrente) is a 2012 Chilean postmodern drama film directed by Raúl Ruiz. It was screened in the Directors' Fortnight section at the 2012 Cannes Film Festival, as well as at the 2012 Toronto International Film Festival, the 2012 New York Film Festival and the 2013 Hong Kong International Film Festival.

== Plot ==
In his final completed film, Ruiz explores the concept of death. The film delves into three dimensions of time, which Ruiz masterfully plays with throughout. For a better understanding, time as a dimension can be further explained here.

The film starts with Don Celso (Sergio Hernández) attending a class by Jean Giono (Christian Vadim) on language use. During the session, an alarm goes off in Don Celso's pocket reminding him to take his medicine. Don Celso and Giono discuss the passage of time in life, which is a theme throughout the movie. Don Celso suggests time is like marbles and can be worn as a necklace, which relates to his exploration of different fantasies as his current self or child-self. This sequence delves into Don Celso's relationship with time.

In the present time, Don Celso works in an office where they write poetry. He's shown at his desk, lost in thought, moving his hands like puppets. His coworker notices this is unusual behavior for him, but we understand he's reenacting his conversation with Jean Giono from the previous sequence. Don Celso is snapped back to reality when his boss interrupts him. We find out he's retiring in a few days and will have a retirement party the next day.

Next, we see Don Celso as a young boy named Rhododendron Celso (Santiago Figueroa), or Rodo for short, in a third dimension. He interacts with Long John Silver (Pedro Villagara), who Rodo perceives as the famous pirate from centuries ago. This sequence showcases Ruiz's use of fantasy and memory, creating separate worlds for his characters.

The film returns to its first dimension with Don Celso and Jean Giono talking about their lives. Don Celso reveals he's waiting for his killer, which becomes a driving force for him throughout the film. The story then shifts back to the third dimension with Rodo. This transition happens when Rodo is asked about his favorite historical figure and he responds with Beethoven. We see Rodo travel to another dimension where he speaks with a non-deaf Beethoven (Sergio Schmied) and learns about 20th-century innovations and inventions, showcasing Ruiz's use of comedy. At the end of the film, we learn that Rodo is the one who kills Don Celso.

Don Celso is shown reading Rodo's stories at a recording station, connecting the second dimension with the third. In Rodo's story, he tries to change his low grade with the help of Beethoven. Ruiz uses humor to criticize Hollywood cinema when Rodo says people go to the movies for fun, not to learn anything. Despite Rodo's intelligence, he cannot change his grade and is almost whipped by his parents until his grandfather intervenes.

The film progresses to the second dimension where Don Celso meets Rolo Pedro (Christian Gajardo), who plans to kill him for his money. Don Celso repeats Rolo Pedro's name multiple times and mistakenly calls him Rhododendron. This is significant because Don Celso believes Rolo Pedro will kill him, but it is actually Rhododendron who does.

The film jumps between different dimensions, including the second dimension where a mass murder takes place at Don Celso's boarding home, leaving him as the only survivor. The young Rodo and Don Celso have a conversation in the same dimension, implying they are the same person and questioning the reality of the story. The film challenges the idea of what is real and imaginative, especially with Long John Silver's conversation with Don Celso.

The film becomes more puzzling with cuts to different dimensions, including a conversation between Rodo and Don in the same dimension, blurring the line between reality and imagination. The sequence ends with Rodo shooting Don, leading him to a new dimension where the dead exist. Don tries to understand this place and eventually reunites with significant characters in a funeral-like setting. Three co-workers give speeches about Don, making it a reflection of Ruiz's work in cinema.

== Cast ==
- Christian Vadim as Professor Giono
- Sergio Hernández as Celso Robles
- Santiago Figueroa as Celso Niño
- Valentina Vargas as Nigilda
- Chamila Rodríguez as Rosina
- Pedro Vicuña as Antenor
- Cristián Gajardo as Rolo Pedro
- Pedro Villagra as Capitain
- Pablo Krögh as Gural Piriña
- Marcial Edwards as Jefe
- Valentina Muhr as Laurita Petrafiel
- Sergio Schmied as Beethoven
- Daniel Guillon as Belmar
- Viviana Herrera as Madre de Celso
- Arturo Rossel as Padre de Celso
- Eugenio Morales as Abuelo de Celso
- Arnaldo Berrios as Padre de Belmar
- José Luis López as Carlos Guerrero
- Cassiel Rojas as Jorge Morales
- Francisco Celhay as Ciclista Ugalde
- Juan Pablo Miranda as Robledano
- Roberto Cobian as Sr. Sarmiento
- Karina Meza as Hija of Belmar
- Eduardo Jaramillo as Almacenero
- Felipe Toledo as Gustavo
- Carlos Flores as Sr. Bitis

== Reception ==
La Noche de Enfrente was selected to show at the following film festivals:

- New York Film Festival (2012)
- Cannes Film Festival (2012)
- Toronto Film Festival (2012)
- Hong Kong Film Festival (2013)

== See also ==
- Cinema of Chile
