= Paulo Branco =

Portuguese film producer (born 1950)

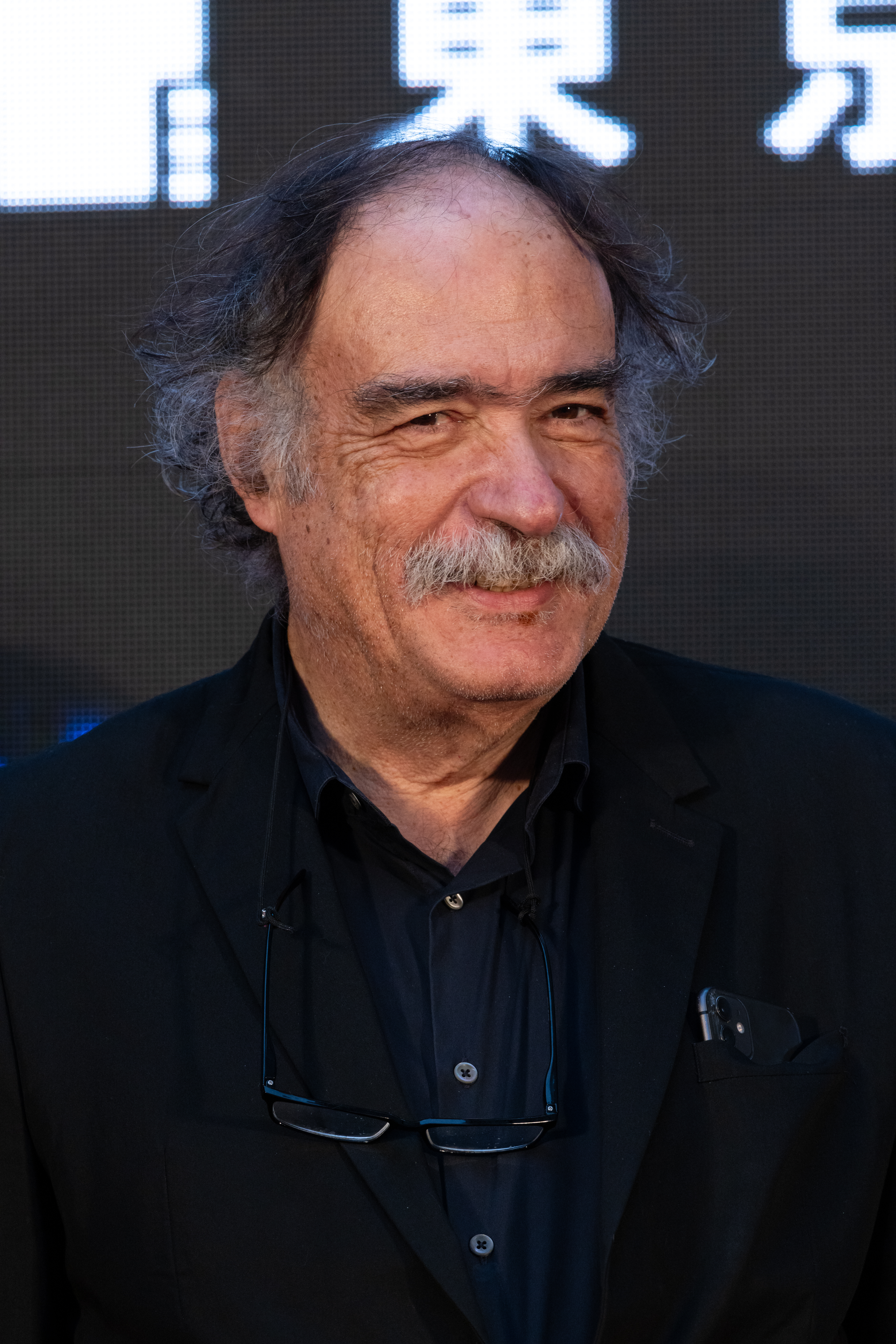
- Branco in 2024
- Born: 3 June 1950 (age 76); Lisbon, Portugal
- Education: Instituto Superior Técnico
- Occupation: Film producer
- Years active: 1975–present
- Children: Juan Branco
- Awards: Leonardo da Vinci World Award of Arts (2019)

Paulo Branco (born 3 June 1950) is a Portuguese film producer.

== Life and career ==
Paulo Branco was born in Lisbon, and attended the undergraduate program in chemical engineering at the Instituto Superior Técnico, but did not graduate. He worked at the Olympic Cinema, in Paris, with Frédéric Mitterrand, in 1974, for two years, before starting his career as a producer in 1979 between Paris and Lisbon.

So far, he has produced over 300 films and has worked with film directors such as David Cronenberg, Jerzy Skolimowski, Wim Wenders, Chantal Akerman, Alain Tanner, Werner Schroeter, André Téchiné, Andrzej Zulawski, Christophe Honoré, Olivier Assayas, Sharunas Bartas, Cédric Kahn, Lucas Belvaux, Valéria Bruni-Tedeschi, João César Monteiro, Paul Auster, Philippe Garrel, Mathieu Amalric... among many others. His career has particularly been branded with an intense collaboration, during more than 20 years, with Raúl Ruiz (Time Regained, Three Lives and Only One Death) and with Manoel de Oliveira (Francisca, Abraham's Valley, The Satin Slipper).

He has been member of the jury at the Berlinale (1999), at Venice's Mostra (2005), and at the Rotterdam Film Festival (2006). In 2011, he was foreman of the jury at the Lecce Film Festival and at the Locarno Film Festival.

Paulo Branco is also the producer who has had the largest number of films selected at Cannes Film Festival and the greatest number of films having competed for the Golden Palm. He presented 53 films in Cannes - 27 of which in Official Selection - and brought 48 films to the Venice Film Festival.

He created several production and distribution companies in Portugal - Madragoa Filmes, Leopardo Filmes, Clap Filmes - where he also owns movie theatres and in France: Les Films du Passage, Gemini Films, and lately Alfama Films. Established in 2006, Alfama Films Production extends Paulo Branco's commitment for independent cinema with directors he's been supporting for a long time but also with emerging talents, always taking on new challenges like Cronenberg's Cosmopolis. In just a few years, it has built an largefilm catalogue included in many film festivals. Lines of Wellington by Valeria Sarmiento was presented in competition at the 2012 Venice Film Festival. Cosmopolis was selected in the official competition of Cannes in 2012. Mysteries of Lisbon by Raúl Ruiz was selected in competition at Toronto’s and San Sebastian’s Festival, Ashes and blood by Fanny Ardant was presented Out of competition in the Official Selection of Cannes 2009, This Night by Werner Schroeter was in competition in Venice 2008. Four Nights with Anna by Jerzy Skolimowski did the opening of Cannes' Directors Fortnight in 2008. Love Songs by Christophe Honoré was selected in the official competition of Cannes 2007. Alfama Films has also been developing its activities of theatrical distribution, international sales and video edition.

Paulo Branco is President of the Lisbon & Estoril Film Festival, event that he founded in 2007. He is the father of French lawyer and political activist Juan Branco.

== Selected filmography ==
=== Producer ===
- Ill-Fated Love (1979)
- Oxalá (1980)
- Francisca (1981)
- The Territory (1981)
- The State of Things (1982)
- Three Crowns of the Sailor (1982)
- In the White City (1983)
- City of Pirates (1983)
- Le soulier de satin (1984)
- Manoel's Destinies (1985)
- Treasure Island (1985)
- Maine-Océan (1986)
- The Cannibals (1988)
- Winter's Child (1989)
- No, or the Vain Glory of Command (1990)
- The End of the World (1992)
- Abraham's Valley (1993)
- Normal People Are Nothing Exceptional (1993)
- Lisbon Story (1994)
- The Convent (1995)
- Down to Earth (1995)
- The Phantom Heart (1996)
- Five Days, Five Nights (1996)
- Three Lives and Only One Death (1996)
- Pour rire ! (1996)
- Few of Us (1996)
- Genealogies of a Crime (1997)
- Ossos (1997)
- Voyage to the Beginning of the World (1997)
- The House (1997)
- Anxiety (1998)
- Traffic (1998)
- The New Eve (1999)
- Time Regained (1999)
- As Bodas de Deus (1999)
- Modern Life (2000)
- La fidélité (2000)
- The Captive (2000)
- Le stade de Wimbledon (2001)
- I'm Going Home (2001)
- Get a Life (2001)
- I Am Dina (2002)
- The Uncertainty Principle (2002)
- Two (2002)
- It's Easier for a Camel (2003)
- A Talking Picture (2003)
- That Day (2003)
- Changing Times (2004)
- Ma mère (2004)
- In the Darkness of the Night (2004)
- Tomorrow We Move (2004)
- Alice (2005)
- C'est pas tout à fait la vie dont j'avais rêvé (2005)
- In Paris (2006)
- A Few Days in September (2006)
- Love Songs (2007)
- From Now On (2007)
- Très bien, merci (2007)
- The Inner Life of Martin Frost (2007)
- Four Nights with Anna (2008)
- This Night (2008)
- Ashes and Blood (2009)
- Mysteries of Lisbon (2010)
- Lines of Wellington (2012)
- Cosmopolis (2012)
- My Soul Healed By You (2013)
- The Blue Room (2014)
- Cadences obstinées (2014)
- Casanova Variations (2014)
- Cosmos (2015)
- L'Astragale (2015)
- Mad Love (2015)
- Fool Moon (2016)
- The Young One (2016)
- Never Ever (2016)
- O Caderno Negro (2018)
- The Domain (2019)

=== Actor ===
- 1900 (1976) - Orso Dalcò
- In the White City (1983) - L'homme dans la gare (uncredited)
- Point de fuite (1984)
- Vidas (1984) - Carlos
- Três Menos Eu (1988)
- Piano panier ou La recherche de l'équateur (1989) - António
- Les infortunes de la beauté (1999) - Le gardien
- Mister V. (2003) - Batistella
- Blood Curse (2003) - Godofredo Monteiro (final film role)

== Awards ==
- 1997: Europa Award of the European Parliament
- 1998: Gabriela Mistral Order of the Republic of Chile
- 2002: Raimondo Rezzonico Award of the Locarno Film Festival
- 2004: Officer of the Order of Arts and Letters of the French Republic
- 2019: Leonardo da Vinci World Award of Arts conferred by the World Cultural Council
