= Dark at Noon =

1993 film

- Film poster
- Directed by: Raúl Ruiz
- Written by: Raúl Ruiz; Paul Fontaine
- Produced by: Leonardo De La Fuente; Pierre Bernard Guiremand; Antonio de Cunha Telles
- Starring: John Hurt; Didier Bourdon
- Cinematography: Ramón F. Suárez
- Edited by: Helen Weiss-Miller
- Music by: Jorge Arriagada
- Distributed by: Sidereal Distribution
- Release date: 20 January 1993
- Running time: 100 minutes
- Countries: Portugal; France
- Languages: English; French

Dark at Noon (French: L'Œil qui ment, lit. The Eye that Lies) is a 1993 French-Portuguese surrealist comedy film directed by Chilean filmmaker Raúl Ruiz. It was entered into the 1992 Cannes Film Festival.

The film portrays a surrealist world that Felicien, the protagonist played by Didier Bourdon, must navigate through as he seeks to learn what has become of his deceased father's fortune. Described as "an elaborate Dadaist joke" by The New York Times, Ruiz's film was intended to emulate a Monty Python-esque humor with deadpan comedic tone.

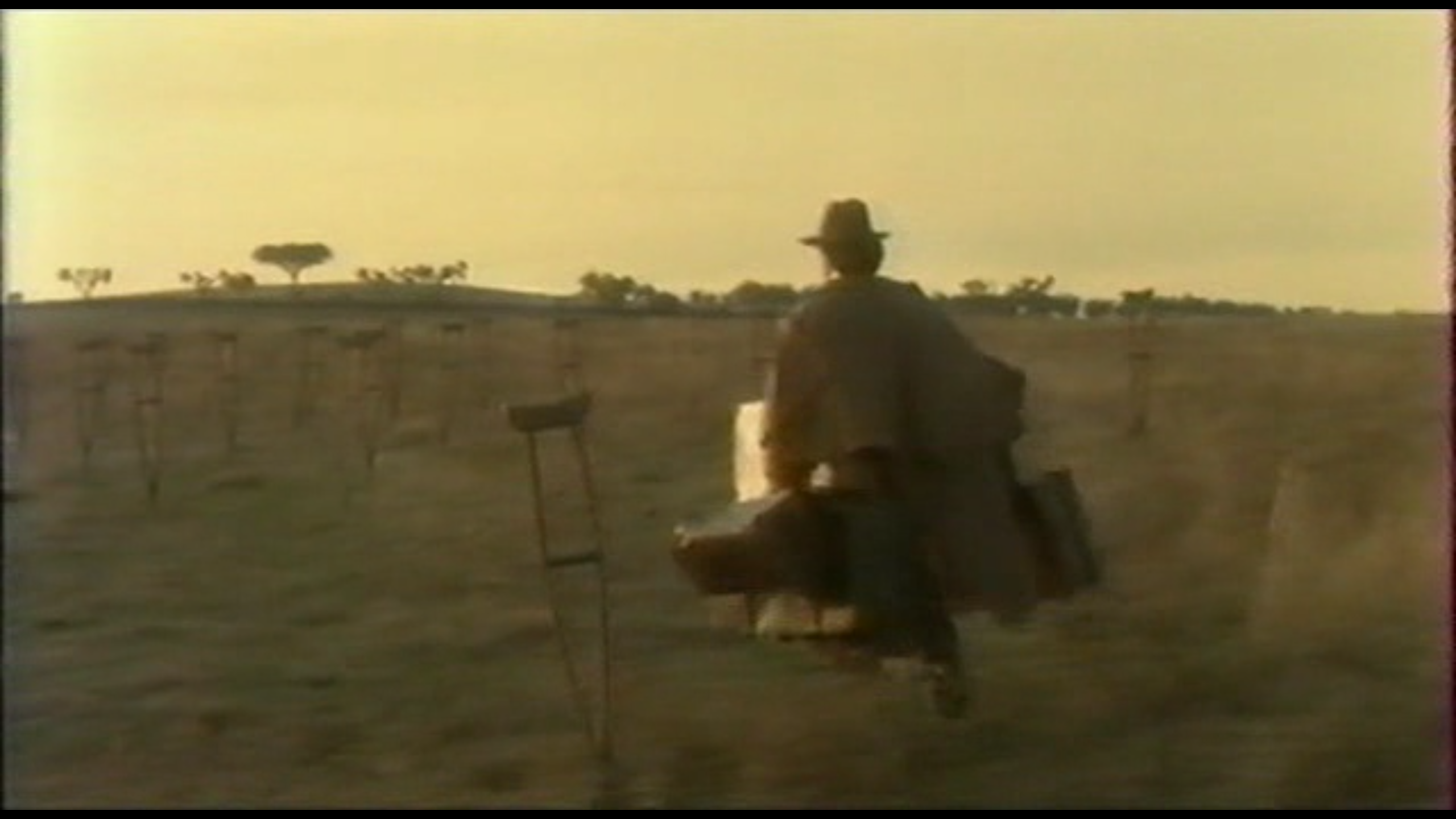
Dark at Noon scene

== Plot ==
After World War I, the French doctor Felicien travels to a small town in Portugal to visit a factory his father invested his fortune in prior to his death. Upon his arrival in the town with fields of crutches protruding from the ground, Felicien finds the area to be a surreal dream world where visions and miracles are such ordinary occurrences they become a nuisance. The dogs of the town are sacred animals and the people of the town are the sleep walking undead. Felicien finds his way to a mansion where Anthony, the wealthy owner of the factory that produces prosthetic limbs, resides with his wife Ines. After sitting through a very bizarre dinner with the residents of the mansion Felicien has an equally strange dream involving the couple.

While exploring the town Felicien meets a priest buried in the ground by Ellis, an artist who uses corpses to make living paintings and who looks identical to one of Felicien's psychiatric patients. The priest is exhausted by the endless miracles, as it is his job to excommunicate people for performing miracles not authorized by the church. Felicien continues to have strange encounters that blur the lines between illusion and the real, including conversations with Le Marquis, who inhabits the same body as Anthony, and the Virgin Mary who mimics and mocks Felicien when she appears before him. He also meets a young boy who performs miracles and helps Felicien out when he can't find a bathroom and needs to urinate. One of Felicien's more unusual encounters is with a giant sculpture of a finger made from marble that crashes through the ceiling of the guest room of the mansion, nearly crushing him.

Felicien explores Anthony's mansion to find a basement laboratory where disturbing experiments are performed. Felicien learns that doubles of Anthony and Ines were created in the lab when their souls left their bodies one night. The couple's souls wander and sometimes occupy the body of Le Marquis. Towards the end of the film Felicien visits the laboratory again and gets thrown out of the lab where he finds himself stuck levitating in the air against his will. The miracle performing boy attempts to help him get back on the ground, but must first get permission to perform the miracle. In the meantime the priest lassoes a rope around Felicien and leads him around. Eventually the miracle boy is able to help him down to the ground. Felicien rushes back to the laboratory when he hears Le Marquis is dying to wish him farewell. Felicien finally leaves the strange town, floating away as he walks towards the sky.

== Cast ==
- John Hurt as Anthony / Le Marquis
- Didier Bourdon as Doctor Felicien
- Lorraine Evanoff as Ines
- David Warner as Ellic
- Daniel Prévost as Le curé
- Myriem Roussel as La vierge des imitations
- Felipe Dias as L'enfant
- Baptista Fernandes as Père Felicien
- Alexandre de Sousa as Médecin 1
- Laurent Moine as Médecin 2
- Rui Mendes as Employe
- André Maia as Jeune ouvrier
- Rui Luís Brás as Prisonnier

== Production ==
=== Locations ===
In an interview, Ruiz states he chose Portugal because it reminds him of Chile, specifically remarking on how the Portuguese and Chileans never look people in the eye, but instead look at the chest, but above all else the Portuguese possess a sense of secrecy which Ruiz was drawn to. He also comments "the Alentejo is the frontier, a very isolated place where history becomes an unbelievable blow" when asked why he chose Alentejo as the setting of the film.

=== Casting ===
Originally, Ruiz had wanted to cast Nanni Moretti in the role of Felicien because a producer wanted the film to resemble a comedy as much as possible, but after seeing Didier Bourdon’s audition for a smaller role, Ruiz decided to make him one of the main characters. The role of the parish priest was also recast prior to filming. The role was originally intended for Jean-Francois Stevenin, but due to scheduling conflicts the role was rewritten for Daniel Prevost. The male lead of Le Marquis Anthony was played by John Hurt, and the female lead of his niece, Ines, was played by Lorraine Evanoff.

=== Filming ===
Dark at Noon was the first film Ruiz made with panoramic framing. The film was shot on an Arri 535 camera with a very sensitive film stock, as opposed to previously shooting on 16 mm film. Ruiz states the new technical means of the film helped create a distinction from the look and feel of television that was more cinematic and allowed him to create shots that gave viewers "the feeling that they occupied a precise and determined place from which their vision was exercised."

== Reception ==
Dark at Noon premiered at the 1992 Cannes Film Festival where the film competed for the Palme d’Or. The film also screened at the Chicago International Film Festival the same year and in 1993 it was briefly released theatrically in several countries. Dark at Noon received both positive and negative reviews from critics ranging from the highest praise to complaints about the plot being confusing and incomprehensible. Frédéric Richard wrote in Positif magazine (July 1992 issue): "The eye that lies was without a doubt the most original movie of the competition, the more positively innovative and most interesting for its look carried on the world of the pictures. No luck of prize, therefore, for Raul Ruiz to the festival of Cannes, dominated this year by a manifest reactionary tendency. With the oeii that lies, Ruiz achieves a funny, oniric and troubling movie." However, a less favorable review of Dark at Noon calls the film "intriguing or amusing at times, but mostly infuriatingly confusing and random." Richard Scheib (for Moria - The Science Fiction Horror and Fantasy Film Review) gives the film a 1 star rating and claims Ruiz has no idea of a plot for the film.
