= Hugues Quester =

French actor

- Born: 5 August 1948 (age 77); Échemiré, France
- Occupation: Actor
- Years active: 1969-present

Hugues Quester (born 5 August 1948) is a French actor who has appeared in more than 60 films and television shows since 1969. He starred in Raúl Ruiz's 1983 film City of Pirates, and in Eric Rohmer’s 1990 film A Tale of Springtime. Quester also performed in the theater, notably with Denis Lavant in the Russian play Dead Man’s Bluff by Mikhail Volokhov in 1993, adapted by French director Bernard Sobel.

== Selected filmography ==
- Mr. Freedom (1969)
- La rose de fer (1973, as "Pierre Dupont")
- Je t'aime moi non plus (1976)
- L'Adolescente (1978)
- Dickie-roi (1981)
- Julien Fontanes, magistrat (1982)
- City of Pirates (1983)
- Parking (1985)
- No Man's Land (1985)
- Hôtel du Paradis (1986)
- Anne Trister (1986)
- Hard to Be a God (1989)
- A Tale of Springtime (1990)
- La Chambre obscure (2000)
- Maigret and the Dead Lover (2026)
