= Cofralandes, Chilean Rhapsody =

- Directed by: Raúl Ruiz
- Written by: Raúl Ruiz
- Produced by: Christian Aspèe; Raúl Ruiz
- Starring: Bernard Pautrat
- Cinematography: Inti Briones
- Edited by: Saskia Berthod; Jean-Christophe Hym; Raúl Ruiz
- Music by: Jorge Arriagada
- Distributed by: Margo Films
- Release date: 2002
- Running time: 312 minutes
- Countries: Chile, France
- Languages: Spanish, French

Cofralandes, Chilean Rhapsody (Spanish: Cofralandes, rapsodia chilena) is an experimental four-part 2002 Franco-Chilean digital video series written and directed by Raúl Ruiz for the Chilean Ministry of Education. The first part won the Glauber Rocha Award for the Best Film from Latin America and a FIPRESCI Award at the Montreal World Film Festival in 2002 "for the director's personal exploration into his homeland, using DV in a rigorous yet playful manner".

== Cast ==
- Bernard Pautrat as Bernard
- Raúl Ruiz as narrator
- Malcolm Coad as English journalist
- Rainer Krause as German artist
- Ignacio Agüero as Rafael
- Mario Montilles as old Rafael
- Marcial Edwards as a guide in the Museum of Nothing
- Javier Maldonado as a guide in the Museum of the Sandwich
- Francisco Reyes as patriotic priest
- Amparo Noguera as patriotic priest's realist sister
- Néstor Cantillana as country bumpkin
- Isabel Parra as Death
- Ángel Parra as Our Lord Jesus Christ
- Miriam Heard as a consular officer
- Luis Villaman as Don Marat the schoolteacher
- José Luis Barba as Cuban schoolteacher
