= Dialogues of Exiles =

1975 film

- film poster
- Directed by: Raúl Ruiz
- Written by: Raúl Ruiz
- Produced by: Raúl Ruiz; Percy Matas
- Starring: Françoise Arnoul
- Cinematography: Gilberto Azevedo
- Edited by: Valeria Sarmiento
- Release date: 23 April 1975
- Running time: 100 minutes
- Countries: Chile, France
- Languages: Spanish, French

Dialogues of Exiles (Spanish: Diálogos de exiliados, French: Dialogue d'exilés) is a 1975 French-Chilean satirical film with documentary elements directed by Raúl Ruiz.

== Plot ==
Chilean exiles in Paris are shown discussing the challenges they faced following the 1973 Chilean coup d'état. In an attempt to reeducate a touring singer from their homeland, they kidnap him. This marks Ruiz's debut French film, in which he examines the mannerisms and language used by his fellow exiles. Having been a member of this community, he depicts a shared sense of belonging among those living in exile, brought together by the tragic downfall of the Allende government and the brutality of the Pinochet dictatorship.

== Cast ==
- Françoise Arnoul
- Carla Cristi
- Daniel Gélin
- Sergio Hernández
- Percy Matas
- Etienne Bolo
- Edgardo Cozarinsky
- Huguette Faget
- Luis Poirot
- Waldo Rojas
- Valeria Sarmiento

== Reception ==
Dialogues of Exiles ultimately led to Ruiz's ostracism from the Chilean exile community due to its critical and, at times, unfriendly portrayal of them. Ruiz's depiction of the exiles is laced with scathing humor, and many complained that he had trivialized serious issues such as adaptation, language, space, integration, and cultural shock. Despite the backlash, he continued to explore themes of Chilean identity, dictatorship, and exile in his films.

== Bibliography ==
- Pick, Zuzana M. (1987). "Chilean Cinema in Exile (1973-1986): The notion of exile: a field of investigation and its conceptual framework". Framework: The Journal of Cinema and Media (34): 39–57. JSTOR 44111135. ProQuest 1311780721.
- Blaine, Patrick. "Reconstructing Resistant Memory in the Chilean Social Documentary: Guzmán and Ruiz." Morningside College. Congress of the Latin American Studies Association, Toronto, Canada. 2010
- Goddard, Michael (2013). "Impossible cartographies: approaching Raúl Ruiz's cinema". Em Questão. 19 (1). Porto Alegre: 21–41. ProQuest 1528422386.
