= Days in the Country =

- film poster
- Directed by: Raúl Ruiz
- Written by: Raúl Ruiz (based on Federico Gana)
- Cinematography: Inti Briones
- Music by: Jorge Arriagada
- Release date: December 15, 2004
- Running time: 89 minutes
- Countries: Chile, France
- Language: Spanish

Days in the Country (Spanish: Días de campo) is a 2004 French-Chilean drama film written and directed by Raúl Ruiz. It won the International Critics Award at the Lima Latin American Film Festival in 2006.

== Plot ==
Two elderly men converse in a bar in Santiago de Chile, speaking as if they are deceased, blurring the line between reality and imagination.

== Cast ==
- Marcial Edwards
- Mario Montilles
- Bélgica Castro
- Ignacio Agüero
- Francisco Reyes
- Amparo Noguera
