= Pascal Kané =

French film director (1946–2020)

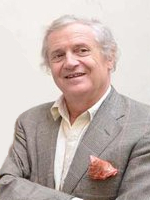
- Pascal Kané (2011)
- Born: 21 January 1946; Angoulême, Charente, France
- Died: 31 August 2020 (aged 74)
- Occupations: Film director, screenwriter, actor
- Years active: 1975–2020

Pascal Kané (21 January 1946 – 31 August 2020) was a French film director and screenwriter. He studied in Paris before joining the editorial staff of Cahiers du Cinéma from 1969 to 1979. He left Cahiers du Cinéma to concentrate on directing. In addition to numerous documentaries he has directed feature films including Dora et la lanterne magique, Liberty belle and Un jeu d’enfant. He lectured on cinema at Université Paris III.

== Filmography ==
- 1973 : La mort de Janis Joplin
- 1975 : India Song
- 1976 : A propos de Pierre Rivière
- 1977 : Dora et la lanterne magique
- 1978 : La vocation suspendue
- 1980 : La Machine panoptique
- 1980 : Destination l’invisible
- 1981 : Chirico par Cocteau
- 1982 : La couleur de l’abime
- 1983 : Liberty Belle
- 1984 : Nouvelle suite venitienne
- 1986 : L’effet France aux USA
- 1987 : Le fantôme du theatre
- 1988 : La perle et les cochons
- 1988 : Dernier cri
- 1989 : L’Arche de la Défence
- 1989 : Un jeu d’enfant
- 1990 : La culture en chantier
- 1991 : Premier regard
- 1992 : Hector Guimard: un architecte et ses folies
- 2000 : La Théorie du Fantôme
- 2005 : Biblical Heroines in Painting (documentary)
- 2010 : Je ne vous oublierai jamais
