= Amelia Lópes O'Neill =

1991 film

- Directed by: Valeria Sarmiento
- Written by: Valeria Sarmiento; Raúl Ruiz
- Produced by: Patrick Sandrin
- Starring: Franco Nero
- Cinematography: Jean Penzer
- Edited by: Rudolfo Wedeles
- Release date: February 1991
- Running time: 93 minutes
- Country: Chile
- Language: Spanish

Amelia Lópes O'Neill is a 1991 Chilean drama film directed by Valeria Sarmiento. It was entered into the 41st Berlin International Film Festival.

== Plot ==
Since their father's death, Amelia and her sister Ana have been living in a house overlooking the port of Valparaíso. They both fall in love with the same man, Fernando. Amelia meets him first, then it is Ana's turn, who eventually marries him. This epic drama, set in Chile between the two World Wars, is narrated by a magician thief who is devastated by his love for Amelia.

== Cast ==
- Franco Nero as Fernando
- Laura del Sol as Amelia Lópes O'Neil
- Laura Benson as Anna
- Valérie Mairesse as Ginette
- Sergio Hernández as Igor
- Jaime Vadell as L'avocat
- Claudia Di Girolamo as La femme de Fernando
- Carla Cristi as La bonne
- Roberto Navarrete as Le journaliste
