= La Recta Provincia =

- Written by: Raúl Ruiz
- Directed by: Raúl Ruiz
- Music by: Jorge Arriagada
- Country of origin: Chile
- Original language: Spanish

Production
- Cinematography: Inti Briones
- Editor: Valeria Sarmiento
- Running time: 240 minutes

Original release
- Release: 2007

La Recta Provincia ("the straight province") is a four-part 2007 Chilean TV miniseries written and directed by Raúl Ruiz which was edited into a feature film and shown at the Rome Film Festival in 2007. It was the first of the two folklore-themed miniseries' Ruiz made for TVN, the second being Litoral (2008).

== Cast ==
- Bélgica Castro
- Ignacio Agüero
- Ángel Parra
- Javiera Parra
- Francisco Reyes
- Alejandro Sieveking
