= Three Crowns of the Sailor =

1982 film

- Film poster
- Directed by: Raúl Ruiz
- Written by: Raúl Ruiz
- Produced by: Paulo Branco
- Starring: Jean-Bernard Guillard
- Cinematography: Sacha Vierny
- Edited by: Valeria Sarmiento
- Music by: Jorge Arriagada
- Release date: 1982
- Running time: 117 minutes
- Country: France
- Language: French

Three Crowns of the Sailor (French: Les trois couronnes du matelot) is a 1982 French fabulist film with surrealist and oneiric flourishes written and directed by Chilean director Raúl Ruiz.

== Plot ==
The film opens in black and white with the motiveless murder of a professor by his student in an unnamed Polish seaport in 1958. The student walks through the war-torn streets whereupon he meets a sailor who offers him passage from the country through a job on board a ship. They go into a dancehall to wine and dine while they negotiate the deal; the student agrees to listen to the sailor's life story as part of the payment and then to give him three Danish crowns.

The sailor tells his story – depicted in colour – but is interrupted on several occasions by the student who either questions his logic or complains that he has heard this story told time and again. The story begins in Valparaíso where, in search of employment, the sailor is told about a possible place on board a ship called the Funchalense by a local swindler known as "the blind man", whom he later finds stabbed and dying. The sailor brushes this off and obtains the berth before bidding a fond farewell to his mother and sister. He then describes his new crewmates, whose bodies are tattooed with solitary letters of the alphabet. They eat (though salt is forbidden on board) and they never defecate, sweating maggots. One throws himself overboard, yet the next day he is back on deck, saying that it was "The Other" who jumped into the sea. On another occasion, the sailor himself is trapped inside the body of "The Other", and as he wanders around the boat in bewilderment, encounters multiple visions of himself from this alternative perspective.

The story continues to unfold through the sailor's experiences as the Funchalense sails from port to port. In Buenaventura, he befriends and becomes the benefactor of a shy, gum-chewing, doll-collecting, Corín Tellado-reading prostitute named María whom others have called "The Virgin Mary". In Singapore, the French proconsul introduces him to a small boy who is actually a venerable doctor and the sailor adopts the boy as his son. The sailor then witnesses his ship sink, only to miraculously resurface. He finds a replacement mother who is a stowaway on board and then two criminal brothers in Tangier. When he returns to Valparaíso, he finds his actual mother and sister have disappeared, encounters an eccentric Portuguese travelling salesman, and then falls in lust with the mambo dancer Matilde, a femme fatale whose mouth is her only orifice. In Tampico, the sailor meets a scholarly boy who has lived the sailor's entire life through literature. Finally, the sailor meets a wise man in Dakar, a paternal figure who inexplicably asks him for three Danish crowns.

A common motif in all of the sailor's tales is that he has to borrow money in order to progress. Before he can live a happy life as the owner of a bar with his assorted adopted family members, he must pay off all the debts he incurred from his time on the ship. He wins most of the money that he had borrowed by gambling with the ship's captain, with the exception of the elusive three Danish crowns.

The sailor and the student drunkenly leave the dancehall, collect the three crowns from the murdered professor's house, and walk to the harbour. The sailor's story finished and the three crowns paid, the student demands his berth. When the sailor laughs at him and says the student has not earned it yet, the enraged student bludgeons the sailor to death. The sailor immediately reappears on the ship as a phantom and the student understands the true price of the job. The film concludes that there must always be one murderous living sailor among a boat of dead men. The Funchalense sails off to the open sea.

== Cast ==
- Jean-Bernard Guillard as The Sailor
- Philippe Deplanche as Tadeusz Krasinski, The Student
- Jean Badin as The First Officer
- Nadège Clair as María, The Prostitute
- Lisa Lyon as Matilde, The Dancer
- Claude Derepp as The Ship's Captain
- Franck Oger as The Blind Man
- Diogo Dória as The Sailor's Sister's Fiancé
- Geneviève Mnich as The voice

== Style and themes ==
Three Crowns of the Sailor employs various filters to imply different cinematic states. The conversation framing the sailor's journey is mostly denoted by a black and white filter reminiscent of film noir, while the tale itself unfolds in rich colour. Cinematographer Sacha Vierny also uses a variety of cinematic techniques ranging from split-focus diopter, dolly zooms, Dutch tilts and Milton Caniff-inspired mise-en-scène. Various shots cast attention on background elements or subdue the essential subjects with focus on details and objects in the foreground. These various framing techniques often illustrate one of the "six functions of the shot" referenced in Ruiz's later film meditation, Poetics of Cinema.

The cinematic style of the film evokes Ruiz's meditations on the "image-situation" and the method of propagating thought through audiovisual schemas rather than through the transparent plots prescribed by "central conflict theory". Ruiz's varied shooting style illustrates the alternative evocative method mentioned in Poetics of Cinema:

"In all these projects I seek to move from one world into another, using a technique described in baroque Venice, 'Il Ponte,' a way of producing anamorphic agents to play with the four levels of medieval rhetoric: literal, allegorical, ethical, and anagogical... Except that instead of seeking to read all four levels at the same time, the aim is to skip constantly from one level to another. The jump is the element of surprise that not only procures a sudden illumination, but all the pleasure as well. Imagine a slalom skier propelled with each turn not just in another direction, but on to a completely different slope. In this way he manages to travel four different journeys at once, though the point is not in the journeys themselves but in the beauty of his leap from one world to the next."

Thus, some understand these distinctive frames as "jumps" between the four levels of rhetoric, which simultaneously reminds the audience of vital diegetic and symbolic filmic elements and encourages the audience to make the critical interpretive connections these cognitive gaps generate. One term for this mode of production is "visual polysemy."

Three Crowns expresses Ruiz's feelings towards acclimating to life in Paris after leaving Chile in exile. The duality of the living and the dead represented on the Funchalense, a ghost ship redolent of the Caleuche and Flying Dutchman myths (the latter hinted at by composer Jorge Arriagada's elements of Wagnerian pastiche), is representative of the diaspora after the 1973 military coup abruptly ended President Salvador Allende's democratic attempt to integrate socialism into Chilean political culture. The sailor is leaving his home city of Valparaíso to journey the world with a crew of dead sailors. All the crewmembers on the Funchalense are unable to return to their homes and thus rather than having a nationality, they belong to the boat. This is a symbolic representation of having to leave behind your nationality in a foreign land. Bérénice Reynaud has also pointed out the literary and cinematic works that Ruiz is drawing on in the film: from Samuel Taylor Coleridge's The Rime of the Ancient Mariner (1798), Erich Maria Remarque's The Night in Lisbon (1962) and the writings of Hans Christian Andersen, Robert Louis Stevenson, Selma Lagerlöf, Karen Blixen, Jorge Luis Borges and Julio Cortázar to the Orson Welles films The Lady from Shanghai (1947), Mr. Arkadin (1955) and The Immortal Story (1968).

== Reception ==
Although Three Crowns has become one of Ruiz's best-known works and is regarded as one of his most accessible films, when it was screened at the Cannes Film Festival it had a high walk-out rate as it was seen as "deliberately unsynopsizable", according to critic Janet Maslin. Despite this, it was well received for a made-for-TV work, winning the director the Perspectives du Cinéma Français award at the Festival. Ruiz later claimed it was his least favorite of his own films, due to the fact that he had adhered to a conventional script when making it, rather than creating scenes that simply "wanted to exist". Nevertheless, he returned to the theme of mysterious storytelling-obsessed sailors many years later in Litoral (2008).
