= The Wandering Soap Opera =

- Spanish: La telenovela errante
- Directed by: Raúl Ruiz (1990); Valeria Sarmiento (2017)
- Written by: Raúl Ruiz; Pía Rey
- Produced by: Raúl Ruiz; Chamila Rodríguez; Leo Kocking; Andrés Racz; Enrique León
- Starring: Luis Alarcón; Patricia Rivadeneira; Francisco Reyes; Roberto Poblete; Liliana García; Mauricio Pesutic
- Cinematography: Leo Kocking; Héctor Ríos; Rodrigo Avilés
- Edited by: Galut Alarcón
- Music by: Jorge Arriagada
- Production company: Poetastros
- Distributed by: Poetastros
- Release date: 10 August 2017 (Locarno)
- Running time: 80 minutes
- Country: Chile
- Language: Spanish
- Box office: $3,624

The Wandering Soap Opera (Spanish: La telenovela errante) is a 2017 Chilean comedy-drama film directed by Raúl Ruiz and Valeria Sarmiento. Ruiz directed the film in 1990 and Sarmiento supervised the editing in 2017.

== Summary ==
In seven chapters, Chilean reality is portrayed as a surreal collection of soap operas that overlap with one another.

== Cast ==
- Luis Alarcón
- Patricia Rivadeneira
- Francisco Reyes
- Roberto Poblete
- Liliana García
- Mauricio Pesutic

== Production ==
The Wandering Soap Opera was originally filmed by Raúl Ruiz in 1990, but was unfinished. In 2017, Ruiz's widow, Valeria Sarmiento, completed the film. The film was shot in Super 16 mm film.

== Release ==
The film debuted at the Locarno Festival in 2017, and later premiered in the United States at the Film Society of Lincoln Center. The Cinema Guild distributed the film in North America.
