= Manoel's Destinies =

1984 film

- Film poster
- Directed by: Raúl Ruiz
- Written by: Jaden Chong; João Botelho; Leonor Pinhão
- Produced by: Paulo Branco; António Vaz da Silva
- Starring: Ruben de Freitas
- Cinematography: Acácio de Almeida
- Edited by: Rudolfo Wedeles; Claudio Martinez
- Music by: Jorge Arriagada
- Release date: 1984
- Running time: 120 minutes (French theatrical cut); 138 minutes (Portuguese version); 152 minutes (French version)
- Countries: Portugal; France
- Languages: Portuguese; French (dubbed)

Manoel's Destinies (French: Les Destins de Manoel; Portuguese: Os Destinos de Manuel) is a 1984/1985 French-Portuguese children's fantasy film directed by Chilean filmmaker Raúl Ruiz. It was shot on 16 mm film, a co-production of Les Films du Passage, Rita Filmes, and RTP, in association with Revcom Télévision.

== Versions ==
There are multiple versions of this work. Most commonly available is the 1984 French-dubbed TV miniseries that was broadcast in three episodes under the title L'Île aux merveilles de Manoël (roughly 150 minutes). The Portuguese-language version was broadcast as four episodes under the title Aventure au Madeira. Film festival programmes have listed it under different titles, such as Manuel de l’île des merveilles or Manuel na Ilha das Maravilhas.

Manuel de l’île des merveilles first screened on 1 February 1985 at the International Film Festival Rotterdam, winning the KNF Award. Jonathan Rosenbaum, one of the film's champions, described it as "three 50-minute episodes". It was screened later in the same month at the "International Forum" at the Berlin International Film Festival. A two-hour cut under the title Les Destins de Manoel screened in May 1985 at the Cannes Film Festival as part of "Perspectives du cinéma français".

In 2013, the Cinemateca Portuguesa screened the 138-minute Portuguese-language version. In 2024, they screened under the title Les Destins de Manoel / Os Destinos de Manuel a digital copy of the complete and commercially unreleased 170-minute Portuguese-language version that they hold.

== Parts ==
It is divided into three parts:

- "Os Destinos de Manuel" / "Les Destins de Manoel"
- "O Piquenique dos Sonhos" / "Le Pique-nique des rêves"
- "A Pequena Campeã de Xadrez" / "La Petite Championne d'échecs"

The fourth episode of the Portuguese TV miniseries was titled "Tragédia Maderense".

== Cast ==
- Ruben de Freitas as Manoel (7yo)
- Teresa Madruga as Manoel's Mother
- Fernando Heitor as Manoel's Father
- Marco Paulo de Freitas as Manoel (13yo)
- Diogo Dória as Captain Araujo
- Cecília Guimarães
- Vasco Pimentel
- José de Freitas
- Aurélie Chazelle
- Miguel Silva
- Pedro M. Ruivo
