= Poetics of Cinema =

Poetics of Cinema 1: Miscellanies
- Author: Raúl Ruiz
- Original title: Poétique du cinéma
- Translator: Brian Holmes
- Genre: Film theory
- Publication date: 1995

Poetics of Cinema 2
- Author: Raúl Ruiz
- Original title: Poétique du cinéma 2
- Translator: Carlos Eduardo Morreo
- Genre: Film theory
- Publication date: 2006

Poetics of Cinema 3
- Author: Raúl Ruiz
- Original title: Poéticas del cine
- Translator: Alan Pauls
- Language: Spanish
- Genre: Film theory
- Publisher: Ediciones UDP
- Publication date: 2013
- Publication place: Chile

Poetics of Cinema is a book series of film theory by Chilean filmmaker Raúl Ruiz (1941–2011) consisting principally of lectures he gave in diverse locations between 1990 and 2009.

== Overview ==
In Poetics of Cinema 1: Miscellanies (1995), Ruiz outlines his rejection of John Howard Lawson's central conflict theory and makes a case for unique, enigmatic boredom in film. In Poetics of Cinema 2 (2006), he addresses the notions of fascination and detachment with respect to the film-image. In the third volume (published posthumously in Spanish in 2013) he takes on Sergei Eisenstein's writings and describes his own work on La Recta Provincia and Nucingen House.

In a March 2016 Lincoln Center masterclass, Ruiz's regular actor Melvil Poupaud said of Ruiz that: "He was more political in an aesthetic way than just a director. For instance, the book he wrote when he was a teacher in Harvard at the beginning of the nineties are still very important for me. I read them and I understand them more and more and it's his vision poetical but mostly political finally that matters more and more to my mind... It's very important I think to read it especially nowadays because he was very visionary especially on the narrative theory that is now so important to those TV shows all around the world and he had a very interesting theory about ways of controlling inspiration like the weapon."

== See also ==
- Historical poetics
