= That Day (film) =

2003 film

- Film poster
- Directed by: Raúl Ruiz
- Written by: Raúl Ruiz
- Produced by: Paulo Branco
- Starring: Bernard Giraudeau; Elsa Zylberstein
- Cinematography: Acácio de Almeida
- Edited by: Valeria Sarmiento
- Music by: Jorge Arriagada
- Release date: 4 June 2003
- Running time: 105 minutes
- Countries: Switzerland; France
- Language: French
- Budget: $2.5 million
- Box office: $870,000

That Day (French: Ce jour-là) is a 2003 Swiss-French absurdist black comedy film directed by Chilean filmmaker Raúl Ruiz. It was entered into the 2003 Cannes Film Festival.

== Plot ==
Livia, a young but mentally unaware woman, lives on an expansive state with a significant wealth. It is revealed through her somewhat childish behavior that she suffers from delusional visions, ones that she writes in her notebooks and shares with strangers.

Her father and surrounding family members, seeing an opportunity to accumulate her inheritance, seek out a solution to have her die in order for others to receive the wealth she holds. They find a mental patient named Pointpoirot, whose sociopathic demeanor and violent tendencies lead to Harald choosing him for the job.

Pointpoirot is released from the institution, given instructions to kill Livia. At Livia's estate, she encounters Pointpoirot as he wanders outside, finding herself oddly curious with his behavior (such as his mirrorless switchblade shaving). She allows him in, charmed by his politeness and seemingly innocent behavior, until he snaps and attempts to attack her. In retaliation, Livia knocks out Pointpoirot with a hammer, then accidentally killing one of her unsuspecting relatives with the same weapon.

Following this, Livia finds herself wandering around the estate, seemingly oblivious to the crime she had committed. Pointpoirot, once awakened, finds himself intrigued by Livia's behavior, begins to aid her, murdering family members one by one as they appear at the estate. Forming an affectionate bond, Pointpoirot and Livia share time together, singing and playing piano as well as conversing. Meanwhile, the inspector and police officer assigned to the case appear to do nothing, instead allowing the conspiracy to unfold as it will.

As family members progressively continue to die, it becomes clear that Livia is unaware of the fact that they are actually dead, going so far as to set up her relatives' bodies for supper. Livia and Pointpoirot continue to fall in love, whilst Harald continues to investigate the disappearances of the family. Upon realizing what is coming, Pointpoirot escapes, declaring his love for Livia as he makes his getaway. Harald arrives at her home, horrified by the carnage that had ensued. An investigator looking into the murderers discovers the motivations of the family to inherit the fortune. Harald, although tempted to end the madness by killing Livia, finds himself trapped, and with few options, commits suicide.

As the film ends, we see schoolchildren walking in a line to class as military trucks drive by in a caravan. Over a disembodied radio, we hear a voice describing the massacre at the estate.

== Cast ==
- Bernard Giraudeau – Pointpoirot
- Elsa Zylberstein – Livia
- Jean-Luc Bideau – Raufer
- Jean-François Balmer – Treffle
- Christian Vadim – Ritter
- Laurent Malet – Roland
- Rufus – Hubus
- Féodor Atkine – Warff
- Jacques Denis – Patron café
- Édith Scob – Leone
- Hélène Surgère – Bernadette
- Laurence Février – Edmonde
- Jean-Michel Portal – Vogel
- Jean-Baptiste Puech – Luc
- Matthias Urban – Dorival
- Michel Piccoli – Harald

== Reception ==
Rotten Tomatoes gave That Day an approval rating of 63%, based on eight reviews, with an average rating of 5.7/10. In a positive review, Dennis Schwartz of Ozus' World Movie Reviews states, "It never gets beyond the playful farce stage as the tale is filled with droll humor and absurd situations, but it remains entertaining as one of Ruiz's more accessible but minor works." Filipe Furtado of Rouge adds further in a positive review: "Part of the fun in Ruiz's cinema is that he is a filmmaker who simultaneously feels a huge desire to exert control – to guarantee the auteur's signature, one could say – but at the same time he experiences an anarchic pleasure in letting the film escape from his hands. The joy of That Day comes from those moments of escape."

However, in a negative review, Jeffrey M. Anderson of Combustible Celluloid states, 'From France comes the latest by the prolific Raoul Ruiz, That Day, which follows the bizarre relationship between a loony bird-like young woman (Elsa Zylberstein) and a serial killer (Bernard Giraudeau). Set in Switzerland "in the near future", it's either too unhinged or not unhinged enough, I haven't decided yet.'"
