= On Top of the Whale =

1982 film

- Film poster
- Directed by: Raúl Ruiz
- Written by: Raúl Ruiz
- Produced by: Kees Kasander; Monica Tegelaar
- Starring: Willeke van Ammelrooy
- Cinematography: Henri Alekan
- Edited by: Valeria Sarmiento
- Music by: Jorge Arriagada, performed by members of the Rotterdam Philharmonic Orchestra
- Distributed by: Rotterdam International Film Festival
- Release date: 4 February 1982
- Running time: 90 minutes
- Country: Netherlands
- Languages: Dutch; French; English; Spanish; German

On Top of the Whale (Dutch: Het dak van de walvis) is a 1982 Dutch surrealist/magical realistic fantasy film directed by Chilean filmmaker Raúl Ruiz while he was in exile and "...is one of his most delirious and ambitious hoax-like fictions".

The film employs the use of six different languages, including an invented one. The story follows a Dutch anthropologist and his wife and child who are invited to the house of a communist millionaire in Patagonia (an area located in Chile and Argentina) to study the last two surviving Yachanes Indians.

== Cast ==
- Willeke van Ammelrooy as Eva
- Jean Badin as Luis
- Fernando Bordeu as Narciso
- Herbert Curiel as Adam
- Amber De Grau as Eden
- Luis Mora
- Ernie Navarro

== Plot ==
The film unfolds as an ethnography and starts in the Netherlands at the beach, where Jean (a Dutch anthropologist) and his wife Eva meet a communist millionaire (Narciso), who later invites them over to his house in Patagonia to study the last two surviving Yachanes Indians. They accept the invitation and bring along their daughter Anita. Jean focuses his research on interpreting the language of the Indians, which has so far denied interpretation. At first they make a childish impression on the anthropologist, seeming to speak a language that consists of only one word: "yamascuma". A scene is shown where the anthropologist picks up several items, asking the Indians what their word is for each item. Every time they pronounce the word "yamascuma" in a different way, each enunciation having roughly 100 different prosodic patterns. The language seems to be reinvented daily and Jean struggles with his comprehension of it, reading its structure in a complex mathematical sense. Later, it is revealed that this in fact is a fake language when Jean accidentally leaves his tape recorder on in the presence of the Indians, recording a language that they do not use in front of anyone else.

Other subplots in the story involve a love triangle between Jean, Eva and Narciso and the addressing of fluid gender identity of Anita, who is clearly struggling whether they should identify as male or female. This is illustrated in the scene of 01.00.45-01.02.51 where Anita looks in the mirror and tells Eva that everything reflected in the mirror is the opposite and thus changes gender.

Ruiz on On Top of the Whale:

"It has become kind of an impressionistic film about the experiences of different characters who get in contact with the two Indians. My earlier films dealt with borderline cases as well, but at the moment I reflect more upon problems to do with cinematic machinery. What is that mirror in which the image remains captured, what is that mirror that conjures up new confrontations again and again? What are these phantoms, this stereotypes that are produced by film? In my earlier films I have tried to avoid these stereotypes. In this film, however, I have chosen for a linear structure. After two minutes the plot has become entirely clear. Then I show various situations, by using cinematic techniques, us applied by French avant-garde directors in the 1920s and 1930s. That is to say, I used slow-motion, different lenses and similar techniques. Notwithstanding the narrative structure, one can say that it deals with a dream, a nightmare. The film deals with the imaginary, a kind of fear. Maybe not a collective fear, but my personal fear, as someone born in a Latin-American country. This is a personal film, because it has to do with my memories".

== Setting ==
The film is set in the near future, as announced in the beginning, at the end of the twentieth century. The story starts on a beach in the Netherlands, which by then has become "The Netherlands of the Soviet Republic of the Democratic Federal Burgundy and the Socialist United States of Ireland". The film was shot in Rotterdam, where it was also distributed by the Rotterdam Film Festival.

The film employs the use of six languages; English, French, Dutch, German, Spanish and an invented language, coming close to the first film done in Esperanto. They are used in random order and not always provided with subtitles, alienating the viewer. It seems calculated to increase the sense of cultural dislocation, perhaps evoking Ruiz's feelings as a Chilean exile in Europe. He also directs iconic barbs at the European condescension towards the Third World.

== Cinematography ==
The cinematography (done by Henri Alekan) of On Top of the Whale can be classified as typically Ruizian; the use of chromatic colored filters, unusual composition and framing and tableau vivant images. The film scholar Michael Godard describes it as

"the oft-noted visual excess of the film, the use of artificial coloured filters and other trick devices seemingly unnecessary for a film about language can perhaps best be situated; in the sense that the anthropologist's attempts at comprehending the 'world-view' of the Indians by deciphering their language will inevitably fail since not only is their language untranslatable from its original context but also any such encounter is inevitably a game in which the 'objects' of ethnographic inquire are dissimulating themselves and this dissimulation is inevitably subject to further distortions in its interpretations".

== Themes ==
Several themes that come forth in On Top of the Whale include Life, Survival, Love, Reality, Illusion, Marxism and Civilization. It could be treated as a parodic version of a problematic cross-cultural "first contact", in colonial settings. Its emphasis is on the anthropologists attempt to understand native culture and unintentionally harming it as a result.
