= Neo-Baroque film =

Neo-Baroque film is a type of film theory that (while the term "neo-baroque" is borrowed from the writings of semiologist Umberto Eco and philosopher Gilles Deleuze) is used in film studies to describe certain films, television shows and Hollywood blockbusters characterised by the excessively ornate, carnivalesque fragmentation of the film frame and/or narrative, sometimes to the point of spatial and/or narrative incoherence.

== Notable films associated with Neo-Baroque cinema ==
- La dolce vita (1960)
- 8 1/2 (1963)
- Amarcord (1973)
- Close Encounters of the Third Kind (1977)
- Star Wars (1977)
- The Evil Dead series (1981-1992)
- Mad Max: Beyond Thunderdome (1985)
- Jurassic Park (1993)
- Contact (1997)
- Event Horizon (1997)
- Moulin Rouge (2001)
- Avatar (2009)

== Notable directors associated with Neo-Baroque cinema ==
- Peter Greenaway
- Sally Potter
- Raúl Ruiz
- Claire Denis
- Steven Spielberg
- Sam Raimi
- Pedro Almodovar
- Baz Luhrmann
- James Cameron
- Luc Besson
- Federico Fellini

== See also ==
- Baroque
- Experimental film
- Oneiric (film theory)
- Vulgar auteurism
- Philosophy of film
- Postmodernist film
- Surrealist film
