= The Black Book (2018 film) =

2018 film

- Film poster
- Portuguese: O caderno negro
- Directed by: Valeria Sarmiento
- Written by: Carlos Saboga, Camilo Castelo Branco
- Produced by: Paulo Branco
- Starring: Lou de Laâge
- Cinematography: Acácio de Almeida
- Edited by: Luca Alverdi
- Music by: Jorge Arriagada
- Release date: 7 September 2018 (TIFF)
- Running time: 113 minutes
- Country: Portugal
- Language: French

The Black Book (Portuguese: O caderno negro) is a 2018 Portuguese drama film directed by Valeria Sarmiento. It was screened in the Contemporary World Cinema section at the 2018 Toronto International Film Festival and in competition at the 66th San Sebastián International Film Festival.

== Cast ==
- Lou de Laâge as Laura / Lelia
- Stanislas Merhar as Rufo
- Niels Schneider as Marquis Lusault
- Jenna Thiam as Suzanne Monfort
- Daniela Melchior as La Fille
