= The Territory (1981 film) =

1981 Portuguese horror film

- Theatrical release poster
- Directed by: Raúl Ruiz
- Written by: Raúl Ruiz; Gilbert Adair
- Produced by: Paulo Branco; Roger Corman
- Starring: Isabelle Weingarten; Rebecca Pauly; Geoffrey Carey; Jeffrey Kime; Paul Getty Jr.
- Cinematography: Henri Alekan; Acácio de Almeida
- Edited by: Claudio Martinez; Valeria Sarmiento
- Music by: Jorge Arriagada
- Release date: 15 September 1981 (Portugal)
- Running time: 100 minutes
- Country: Portugal
- Languages: English; French

The Territory (Portuguese: O Território) is a 1981 Portuguese philosophical horror film directed by Chilean filmmaker Raúl Ruiz about two American families who resort to cannibalism shortly after getting lost on a camping trip in the South of France. The film, about the animalistic nature of humans when they disregard their "civilized" instincts, obliquely addresses themes of "exile and crossing boundaries: of language, nation and morality".

== Cast ==
- Isabelle Weingarten as Françoise, Jim's partner
- Rebecca Pauly as Barbara, Peter's partner
- Geoffrey Carey as Peter, Barbara's partner
- Jeffrey Kime as Jim, Françoise's partner
- Paul Getty Jr. as Guide, uncle to Linda's daughter
- Shila Turna as Linda
- Artur Semedo as Indefinite man
- Camila Mora as Young girl
- Ethan Stone as Young boy, Françoise's son
- José Nascimento as Prawler
- Duarte de Almeida as an Indefinite man's friend, was found in the territory as a man lost for much longer than them
- Rita Nascimento as Linda's daughter

== Production ==
The circumstances in which the film was produced, and the extent of Corman's involvement, are somewhat mysterious, co-writer Adair claiming that the film was made under "hair-raising conditions" in Sintra. The production's budgetary difficulties inspired New German Cinema director Wim Wenders to make the Golden Lion-winning The State of Things (1982) with much of the same cast and crew.

== Reception ==
Stephen Holden from The New York Times called it "an odd little art film that has the feel of a European version of an episode of The Twilight Zone." Dennis Schwartz of Ozus' World Movie Reviews awarded the film a grade B+, calling it "Deliciously subversive".
