= Jorge Arriagada =

Chilean film composer (1943–2024)

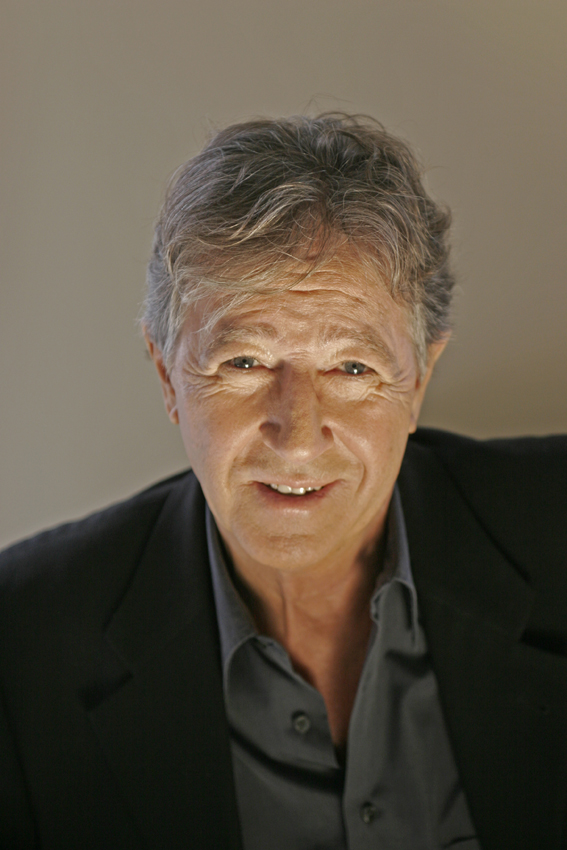
- Arriagada in 2010

Background information
- Born: 20 August 1943; Santiago, Chile
- Died: 8 October 2024 (aged 81)
- Genres: Film score, contemporary classical music
- Occupation(s): Composer, conductor
- Years active: 1977–2024

Jorge Arriagada (20 August 1943 – 8 October 2024) was a French-Chilean composer residing in France. Specializing in film music, he is best known for his longstanding collaboration with director Raúl Ruiz.

== Life and career ==
Arriagada studied composition and orchestral conducting at the National Conservatory of Music in Santiago. Later, he received a four-year scholarship from the French government, allowing him to study in Paris with Max Deutsch, a student and friend of the Austrian composer and theorist Arnold Schönberg. He also studied with Pierre Schaeffer, Olivier Messiaen, and Pierre Boulez.

In 1972, the Guggenheim Foundation in New York awarded Arriagada a scholarship for his contributions to the field of electronic music at Stanford University in California, USA. During the same period, he served as a professor of music composition for French government scholarship recipients.

From 1977, he worked primarily in the film industry, composing music for over 160 films for about thirty directors, including Olivier Assayas, Patricio Guzmán, Benoît Jacquot, Orson Welles, and Barbet Schroeder, as well as 46 films directed by Ruiz.

His film scores often encompass symphonic music, as well as chamber music pieces. He even provided his interpretation of the fictional Vinteuil Sonata for Ruiz's film adaptation of Marcel Proust's In Search of Lost Time in 1999. The genres he has explored include classical, contemporary, electroacoustic, and jazz music.

In 2013, a CD titled "Les Musiques de Jorge Arriagada pour les Films de Philippe Le Guay" was released by Disques Cinémusique, featuring Arriagada's original compositions for Philippe Le Guay's films, including Les Femmes du 6e étage (2010), and Alceste à bicyclette (2013).

Arriagada served as a jury member at various film festivals, including Cannes, San Sebastián, São Paulo, Valencia, Buenos Aires, Valladolid, among others.

In 2020, he was awarded the Grand Prix Sacem de la Musique pour l'image in France.

Arriagada died on 8 October 2024, at the age of 81.

== Filmography ==
Year	Title	Director	Notes
1977	Colloque de chiens	Raúl Ruiz	Best Short Film Award Cesar 1977. Selection Cannes Film Festival 1978
1978	Les Divisions de la nature	Raúl Ruiz	
1978	The Suspended Vocation	Raúl Ruiz	Grand Prix San Remo Film Festival 1978
1979	L'Hypothèse du tableau volé	Raúl Ruiz	Selection Cannes Film Festival 1979
1979	Of Great Events and Ordinary People	Raúl Ruiz	
1980	Zig-Zag - le jeu de l'oie (TV)	Raúl Ruiz	
1981	The Territory	Raúl Ruiz	
1982	Le Péril rampant	Alberto Yaccelini	
1982	On Top of the Whale	Raúl Ruiz	
1982	Moi, l'autre	João Botelho	
1982	Three Crowns of the Sailor	Raúl Ruiz	Selection Cannes Film Festival 1983
1983	Bérénice	Raúl Ruiz	Selection Avignon Festival 1983
1983	City of Pirates	Raúl Ruiz	Selection Venice Film Festival 1983
1984	The Terrible Lovers	Danièle Dubroux and Stavros Kaplanidis	
1984	Point de fuite	Raúl Ruiz	
1984	Paris vu par... vingt ans après	Philippe Venault	
1984	Notre mariage	Valeria Sarmiento	Golden Seashell Best Film San Sebastian International Film Festival 1984
1984	Ave Maria	Jacques Richard	
1985	Ces jours où les remords vous font vraiment mal au coeur	Melvil Poupaud	
1985	Manoel's Destinies	Raúl Ruiz	Selection Cannes Film Festival 1985
1985	The Insomniac on the Bridge	Raúl Ruiz	
1985	Treasure Island	Raúl Ruiz	Selection Cannes Film Festival 1991
1986	Life is a Dream	Raúl Ruiz	
1986	Richard III	Raúl Ruiz	Selection Cannes Film Festival 1986
1986	Dans un miroir	Raúl Ruiz	
1986	Hijos de la guerra fría	Gonzalo Justiniano	
1986	15 août	Nicole Garcia	Selection Cannes Film Festival 1986
1987	Brise-glace	Jean Rouche and Raúl Ruiz	
1987	Le Professeur Taranne	Raúl Ruiz	
1987	The Miracle	Jean-Pierre Mocky	
1987	Buisson ardent	Laurent Perrin	
1988	Les Mendiants	Benoît Jacquot	
1988	Terre Sacrée	Emilio Pacull	
1989	Winter's Child	Olivier Assayas	
1989	Blancs cassés	Philippe Venault	
1989	Les Deux Fragonard	Philippe Le Guay	
1990	Amelia Lopes O'Neill	Valeria Sarmiento	
1990	Le procès du roi	João Mário Grilo	
1990	Un jeu d'enfant	Pascal Kané	
1990	La Désenchantée	Benoît Jacquot	
1991	Langlois Monumental (TV)	Jacques Richard	
1991	Blanval	Michel Mees	
1991	Sushi Sushi	Laurent Perrin	
1991	The Sky Above Paris	Michel Béna	
1992	The End of the World	Raúl Ruiz	
1992	Urgence d'aimer (TV)	Philippe Le Guay	
1992	Das Tripas Coração	Joaquim Pinto	
1992	Terra fria	António Campos	
1993	Dark at Noon	Raúl Ruiz	Won - Sitges Film Festival Award for Best Original Score. Selection Cannes Film Festival 1992
1993	Rhésus Roméo (TV)	Philippe Le Guay	
1993	It's All True	Bill Khrone and Myron Meisel	
1994	Los Náufragos	Raúl Ruiz	
1994	Exterior Night (short)	Mark Rappaport	
1995	Le fabuleux destin de Madame Petlet	Camille de Casabianca	
1995	L'Année Juliette	Philippe Le Guay	
1995	L'Éducatrice	Pascal Kané	
1995	Elle	Valeria Sarmiento	
1995	Three Lives and Only One Death	Raúl Ruiz	Selection Cannes Film Festival 1996
1995	Pili, Prince des rues	Bertrand Van Effenterre	
1996	Transatlantique	Christine Laurent	
1996	L'Éducatrice	Pascal Kané	
1996	Os Olhos da Ásia	João Mário Grilo	Selection Cannes Film Festival 1993
1996	Mi último hombre	Tatiana Gaviola	
1996	Turres Eburnea	Raúl Ruiz	
1996	Transatlantique	Christine Laurent	
1997	El Ché	Maurice Dugowson	
1997	Genealogies of a Crime	Raúl Ruiz	Silver Bear Grand Jury Prize Berlin Film Festival 1997
1997	Le Monde d'Angelo (TV)	Pascal Kané	
1998	Aventureros del fin del mundo (TV)	Miguel Latín	
1998	L'inconnu de Strasbourg	Valeria Sarmiento	
1998	Shattered Image	Raúl Ruiz	
1998	El Entusiasmo	Ricardo Larraín	Selection Cannes Film Festival 1998
1999	Quelque chose	Melvil Poupaud	
1999	La Isla de Robinson Crusoe	Patricio Guzmán	
1999	Time Regained	Raúl Ruiz	Selection Cannes Film Festival 1999
2000	30 ans	Laurent Perrin	
2000	Love Torn in a Dream	Raúl Ruiz	
2000	Our Lady of the Assassins	Barbet Schroeder	Italian Senate Award Venice Film Festival 2000
2000	Comedy of Innocence	Raúl Ruiz	Selection Venice Film Festival 2000
2001	Savage Souls	Raúl Ruiz	Selection Cannes Film Festival 2001
2002	Madrid	Patricio Guzmán	
2002	l'Astronome et l'Indien	Carmen Castillo	
2002	Cofralandes, Chilean Rhapsody	Raúl Ruiz	
2003	That Day	Raúl Ruiz	Selection Cannes Film Festival 2003
2003	A Place Among the Living	Raúl Ruiz	
2004	Operation Hollywood (TV)	Emilio Pacull	
2004	Tout pour l'oseille	Bertrand Van Effenterre	
2004	Salvador Allende	Patricio Guzmán	Selection Cannes Film Festival 2004
2004	Days in the Country	Raúl Ruiz	
2005	The Lost Domain	Raúl Ruiz	
2005	Horcón, al sur de ninguna parte	Rodrigo Gonçalves	
2005	Juanita de Tanger	Farida Benlyazid	
2006	Klimt	Raúl Ruiz	Selection Rotterdam Film Festival 2006
2006	Vocation Cinéaste	Laurent Perrin	
2007	Terror's Advocate	Barbet Schroeder	Selection Cannes Film Festival 2007
2007	La Recta Provincia (TV mini-series)	Raúl Ruiz	
2007	Crosse	Liova Jedlicki	
2007	Nucingen House	Raúl Ruiz	
2008	Secretos	Valeria Sarmiento	
2008	Mr President (TV)	Emilio Pacull	
2008	Inju: The Beast in the Shadow	Barbet Schroeder	Selection Venice Film Festival 2008
2008	Litoral (TV mini-series)	Raúl Ruiz	
2008	Nucingen House	Raúl Ruiz	
2009	Nova: The Incredible Journey of the Butterflies (PBS documentary)	Nick de Pencier	
2009	El Pasaporte amarillo	Raúl Ruiz	
2009	History of a Chair	Pablo Salvador N.G.	
2009	Medea's Ark	Pablo Salvador N.G	
2010	Je ne vous oublierai jamais	Pascal Kané	
2010	Il Était une fois King-Kong	Laurent Perrin	
2010	Mysteries of Lisbon	Raúl Ruiz	ICS Award for Best Original Score.Silver Seashell Award Best Director San Sebastian International Film Festival 2010
2010	La Maleta	Raúl Ruiz	
2010	The Women on the 6th Floor	Philippe Le Guay	Audience Award Colcoa French Film Festival 2010
2011	Ballet Aquatique	Pascal Kané	
2011	Diario de mi Residencia en Chile	Valeria Sarmiento	
2011	Cornelia frente al espejo	Daniel Rosenfeld	Selection Rotterdam Film Festival 2012
2011	Alguien ha visto a Lupita	Gonzalo Justiniano	
2012	Chez Frida Kalo	Xavier Villetard	
2012	Ferlinghetti le dernier des Beatniks	Laurent Perrin	
2012	Night Across the Street	Raúl Ruiz	Selection Cannes Film Festival 2012
2012	Lines of Wellington	Valeria Sarmiento	Selection Venice Film Festival 2012
2013	Cycling with Moliere	Philippe Le Guay	Nominated - César Award for Best Music Written for a Film. Selection Tribeca Festival 2013
2013	Diary of a Residence in Chile (TV series)	Valeria Sarmiento	
2013	L'Harmonie familiale	Camille de Casabianca	
2014	Welcome Home Emma-Rose (short)	Miriam Heard	
2015	Al centro de la Tierra (short)	Daniel Rosenfeld	
2015	Floride	Philippe Le Guay	Selection Locarno Film Festival 2015
2015	Le Saphir de Saint-Louis (short)	José Luis Guerín	
2016	Sélection Oficielle	Jacques Richard	
2016	Tierra Yerma	Miriam Heard	
2016	Raoul Ruiz: Drama Against Ignorance!	Alejandra Rojo	
2016	Jean Dupuy, une Biographie à 2 Têtes (Short)	Pascal Kané	
2016	Mademoiselle Clara (Short)	Daniel Rosenfeld	
2017	Casa di Angeli (TV series)	Valeria Sarmiento	
2017	La Telenovela Errante	Raoul Ruiz and Valeria Sarmiento	Selection Locarno Film Festival 2017
2017	Le Venerable W	Barbet Schroeder	Selection Cannes Film Festival 2017
2018	Il Etait une fois le Progrés	Pascal Kané	
2018	O Caderno Negro	Valeria Sarmiento	Selection San Sebastian Film Festival 2018
2019	Entierro	Maura Morales	Selection Bologna Film Festival 2019
2020	The Tango of the Widower	Raoul Ruiz and Valeria Sarmiento	Selection Berlin Film Festival 2020
2022	L'Heure de Départ	Camille de Casabianca	
2023	El Realismo Socialista	Raoul Ruiz-Valeria Sarmiento	
2023	Toxicily	François Xavier Destors	

== Discography ==
Three original soundtracks composed by Arriagada can be found on the CD compilation Les Musiques de Jorge Arriagada pour les films de Philippe Le Guay, released by Canadian label Disques Cinémusique, in 2013 : Alceste à Bicyclette, Les Femmes du 6e étage and Les Deux Fragonard. French and English liner notes. More information here.

The same label also released the same year Arriagada's complete original soundtrack from Les Lignes de Wellington. More information here.
