= The Lost Domain (film) =

- Film poster
- Directed by: Raúl Ruiz
- Written by: Raúl Ruiz
- Cinematography: Ion Marinescu
- Edited by: Valeria Sarmiento
- Music by: Jorge Arriagada
- Release date: 2005

The Lost Domain (French: Le domaine perdu) is a 2005 French film directed by Chilean filmmaker Raúl Ruiz.

== Cast ==
- François Cluzet as Antoine
- Grégoire Colin as Max
- Julie Delarme as Hélène Renaud
- Marianne Denicourt as Ivonne
- Édith Scob as Madame Chantal
