= A Place Among the Living =

- Film poster
- Directed by: Raúl Ruiz
- Music by: Jorge Arriagada
- Release date: 4 June 2003
- Running time: 103 minutes
- Country: France
- Language: French

A Place Among the Living (French: Une place parmi les vivants) is a 2003 French film directed by Chilean filmmaker Raúl Ruiz.

== Cast ==
- Christian Vadim - Ernest Ripper
- Thierry Gibault - Joseph Archimboldo
- Valérie Kaprisky - Maryse
- Denis Karvil - Le premier amateur
- Cécile Bois - Sabine
- Julie Judd - Sandrine
- Monalisa Basarab - The Blonde
