= Lydia Marinelli =

Austrian historian, editor and academic author

- Born: 15 July 1965; Matrei in Osttirol, Austria
- Died: 8 September 2008 (aged 43); Vienna, Austria
- Education: University of Vienna
- Occupation: Curator of the Sigmund Freud Museum
- Parent(s): Andrä & Gretl Marinelli

Lydia Marinelli (15 July 1965 - 8 September 2008) was an Austrian historian, editor, and curator whose speciality was the history of psychoanalysis. She was the curator of the Sigmund Freud Museum in Vienna.

Marinelli committed suicide. (Note: "Ihr Tod Anfang dieser Woche im Alter von nur dreiundvierzig Jahren beraubt uns einer der originellsten Geisteswissenschaftlerinnen ihrer Generation". Michael Hagner, 2008)

== Life ==
Marinelli was born at Matrei, a relatively isolated little town north of Lienz, high in the mountains of East Tyrol. There were at least four siblings. She studied History, Literature and Philosophy at the University of Vienna, graduating in 1990. In 1992 she took a research fellowship with the Sigmund Freud Society, later becoming a curator at the foundation's Sigmund Freud Museum at Berggasse 19. Marinelli received her doctorate from the University of Vienna in 1999 for a dissertation entitled "Psyches Kanon – Zur Publikationsgeschichte der Psychoanalyse rund um den Internationalen Psychoanalytischen Verlag", concerning the publications on psychoanalysis produced by the highly influential so-called "International Psychoanalytic Publishing House" which operated in Vienna between 1919 and 1938. It was characteristic that Marinelli combined her work on the dissertation with a small (and very well reviewed) exhibition on the same themes which she was preparing for the Freud Museum. The dissertation subsequently provided a basis for several works adapted and published by colleagues after her death.

In 2003/04 Marinelli became "Director of the Research Division" ("wissenschaftliche Leiterin") at the Sigmund Freud Foundation, retaining the post for the rest of her life.

Although the focus of her professional career was on Vienna, Lydia Marinelli was an enthusiastic networker and communicator, notably when it came to encouraging a less polarised and ossified approach to the study of Sigmund Freud. She was an academic researcher at the Library of Congress in Washington, D.C. In 2008, shortly before her death, she also became a "visiting scholar" and stipendiate at the Max Planck Institute for the History of Science in Berlin. She authored a number of papers and articles, sometimes one her own and sometimes jointly with colleagues. Topics to which she repeatedly returned included the History and Theory of Psychology, Dreams and Sigmund Freud. She was also constantly fascinated by with continual changes in the history of media treatment of psychology and related subjects. Her written contributions often coincided with exhibitions that she staged, generally at the Sigmund Freud Museum. She also taught as an outside lecturer at the University of Vienna.

== Exhibitions ==
Lydia Marinelli became known for the imaginative and thought provoking exhibitions that she staged at the Sigmund Freud Museum. Many were specialist, tightly targeted and low-key. At least four of her more substantial exhibitions at the museum attracted wider notice, however:

- 1995 "Internationaler Psychoanalytischer Verlag" ("International Psychoanalytic Publishing House"
- 1998/99 "Meine ... alten und dreckigen Götter, Aus Sigmund Freuds Sammlung" (loosely "My old grubby gods, from the collection of Sigmund Freud")
- 2003 "Freuds verschwundene Nachbarn" ("Freud's disappeared neighbours")
- 2006 "Die Couch. Vom Denken im Liegen" (loosely, "The couch. Thoughts while lying down")
