= Three Lives and Only One Death =

- Film poster
- Directed by: Raúl Ruiz
- Written by: Pascal Bonitzer; Raúl Ruiz
- Produced by: Paulo Branco
- Starring: Marcello Mastroianni
- Cinematography: Laurent Machuel
- Edited by: Rudolfo Wedeles
- Music by: Jorge Arriagada
- Distributed by: Rézo Films
- Release date: 11 October 1996
- Running time: 123 minutes
- Country: France
- Language: French

Three Lives and Only One Death (French: Trois vies et une seule mort) is a 1996 French comedy film directed by Chilean filmmaker Raúl Ruiz. It was entered into the 1996 Cannes Film Festival, and was the penultimate film to star Marcello Mastroianni, before his death in 1996.

== Plot ==
Pierre Bellemare, a French radio personality appears to recount four strange, seemingly non-coexisting, tales that make up the complex narrative structure of Three Lives and Only One Death. In the first tale we are introduced to Andre Parisi, a family man who has woken up with a terrible headache. Andre leaves to a local cafe where he meets one of the multiple enigmatic central characters, Matteo Strano (Marcello Mastroianni). Matteo offers Andre champagne and 1000 francs to listen to his story. Prior to the scene of Matteo's own storytelling, he reveals he was once married to Andre's wife. Matteo recounts the day he went out, on a whim, and rented out an apartment. Matteo insists this apartment is inhabited by fairies who eat time and who ultimately devoured 20 years of his life in one night. Matteo uses the story of his “strange journey in time” to entice Andre into going to his “fairy house.” Andre accepts Matteo's request and is surprised to find that the apartment actually exists. Matteo takes Andre's fondness for the apartment as an acceptance of a deal that allows Matteo to go home, leaving Andre to remain in the bewitched apartment. When Andre refuses to take Matteo's place “he finds himself with a hammer in his head, thus retrospectively explaining his headache as a premonition.” After a 20-year hiatus Matteo returns to his former home and his former wife, Maria, as if nothing had changed.

Bellemare then recounts the tale of George Vickers, a 69-year-old bachelor and Professor of "Negative Anthropology" at the Sorbonne. When Vickers ascends the main stairs at the Sorbonne, to give the opening lecture at a major conference on Negative Anthropology, he pauses and is overcome by a strange force and feeling. The strange force takes him to a graveyard where he shortly experiences grief. When a storm breaks out he becomes profoundly happy, so much so that he does not look for shelter. He becomes a beggar overnight and strangely finds success. Vickers is ambushed on a routine walk home to an abandoned courtyard, but is saved by a prostitute Tanya La Corse aka Maria Gabri-Colosso. Tanya takes Vickers back to her apartment. Vickers explores her apartment and grabs sight of a series of books by Carlos Castañeda. Meanwhile, it is revealed that Vickers occasionally hears Carlos's voice. Vickers professes a passionate loathing of those works in Tanya's apartment. Vickers and Tanya/Maria form a firm friendship; Vickers even moves to a new bench to be closer to his new friend. Tanya/Maria tests the new friendship by entrusting in Vickers to keep a close eye out for her extremely dangerous ex-husband. When Vickers fails to alert Tanya/Maria he returns home to a bench outside his mother's home. When he learns of her death he “experiences a strange feeling of nostalgia” and returns to his role as a professor. One day the past catches up with him and he learns Tanya/Maria also lived a double life as the president of a huge electric company, who had been led to prostitution by her husband. Vickers and Tanya/Maria rekindle their relationship and marry. Like clockwork, Vickers once again ascends the main stairs at the Sorbonne when he suddenly pauses, walks back down the stairs and leaves for the graveyard. Meanwhile, Tanya/Maria('s) ex-husband returns and "re-ignites her taste for the perverse.” Both Tanya/Maria and Vickers once again reverse back to their roles as Prostitute and as beggar.

Bellemare opens the third tale with an announcement about the foundation of the tale, that of which “extreme happiness is an extreme form of misery and excessive generosity is an excessive form of tyranny.” Bellemare also proclaims that the next story is “so true it has taken place not once, but several times.” This third tale which revolves around a young Parisian couple, Cecile and Martin, in love sets the stage for the “crossing between the stories and roles played by Mastroianni." The young couple receives a mysterious weekly gift of 2,000 francs in their mailbox and proceed with their perfect happy life. Both Cecile and Martin “embark on affairs out of kindness.” Cecile cheats on Martin with the next door neighbor, Piotr, a college student who cannot bear to hear the couples "all-consuming" love for each other. Martin unknowingly finds employment with Cecile's mother, Maria from the first tale; they too have an affair. However, the young couple forgives one another. The stories from earlier begin to collide in a seemingly rapid pace. Cecile takes a job working for the businesswoman Tanya/Maria. Later, Tanya/Maria and her ex-husband attempt to entice the young couple into perverse games, but they throw the idea out when they notice the young couple isn't sexy. One day the couple doesn't receive their regular earnings in the mailbox, due to the fact that their “protector” has died. However, their protector remembers them in his will and leaves to them the possession of a Mansion and its butler. The butler, another character played by Mastroianni, responds only to the sound of a bell. The butler plays odd games with the couple, who are now expecting a child. The butler hides the bell and drugs them into sleeping for days on end. One strange night Martin finds the Butler conversing with a businessman and a “tramp.” The tramp leaves Martin bloodied and dazed. This leads to the couple's immediate departure. Their inability to recognize Mastroianni as proprietor and butler results in him claiming the couple's new-born child, which he later leaves on Maria's door steps.

In the final tale Bellemare introduces Luc Allamand, a successful businessman in his 70s. Luc receives a surprising phone call, in the middle of the night, detailing the arrival of his ex-wife, daughter and sister. Luc is taken aback by the news because they do not exist, he invented them for business reasons. Feeling ill Luc returns home and finds his wife, “a 32-year-old star singer in the hands of her accompanist.” Carlos's voice can be distinctly heard whispering, this appears to turn Luc into a sleepwalker. Luc then wanders aimlessly and returns to Maria and his former home as Matteo, once again as if nothing had happened. Mastroianni's multiples identities begin to cross at a more rapid pace. Maria supposedly awakes Matteo, but instead hears Vickers talking in his sleep about Negative Anthropology. Maria then confronts Matteo about his “mistress” Tanya/Maria. The sudden sound of a bell brings triggers Vickers the beggar. His begging nearly turns violent, but Maria is able to find a coin in time to reverse Vickers back to Matteo. That same day Mastroianni's characters return to their former residences. Meanwhile, all the women in his life have been receiving threatening letters. Luc returns to his office where he meets with a famous psychologist Luca Agusta, who congratulates Luc for inventing three women that now exist. After awakening from a bad dream Luc heads to a river where he is confronted by Carlos. In the meantime, all the women in his life rendezvous at a cafe where they encounter all of Mastroianni's characters. All of the identities become murderous and converge in the cafe, resulting in a series of deaths.

== Cast ==
- Marcello Mastroianni - Mateo Strano / Georges Vickers / Butler / Luc Allamand
- Anna Galiena - Maria Gabri-Colosso, "Tania la Corse"
- Marisa Paredes - María
- Melvil Poupaud - Martin
- Chiara Mastroianni - Cecile
- Arielle Dombasle - Helene
- Féodor Atkine - Andre
- Jean-Yves Gautier - Mario
- Jacques Pieiller - Tania's Husband
- Pierre Bellemare - Radio Narrator
- Smaïn - Luca
- Guillaume de Tonquédec - Piotr
- Lou Castel - Bum #1
- Roland Topor - Bum #2
- Jacques Delpi - Bum #3
- Jean Badin - Antoine José

== Reception ==
Raúl Ruiz's work in the latter half of the 1990s gained wider international attention. This newfound visibility for his cinema stems from a personal exhaustion with his own cinema. Ruiz preferred pursuing “less exhausting aesthetic strategies” to create a more pleasurable viewing experience. This pleasurable experience can also be credited to Ruiz favoring a more “normal” production than that of his previous works. Jonathan Romney, from The Guardian, notes, "with his latest film [Ruiz] has made something that stands every chance of being a commercial success." Romney's quote emphasizes a shift in Ruiz's cinema that allowed his work to garner more attention. However, this new found global expansion, of Ruiz's cinema, did protect the film from scrutiny. As Ed Scheid writes, “because the characters calmly accept every outrageous event, the film fatally lacks tension and believability.” Other critics acknowledged Ruiz's “superb storytelling,” while simultaneously doubting whether the film “would spring to life in such a delightful way without an actor of Mastroianni's caliber.” Many critics ascribe Marcello Mastoianni's performance to the film's commercial acceptance. This did not keep critics like Jonathan Rosenbaum from recognizing Three Lives and Only One Death “as being the best of [Ruiz's] movies [he'd] seen in a long time.” Yet, even Rosenbaum's states that this praise did not persuade the film's biggest critic, Ruiz himself, into accepting it as his own favorite film.

== Awards and nominations ==
- 1996 - Marcello Mastroianni winner, Silver Wave Award
- 1996 - Raúl Ruiz nominated, Palme d'Or
- 1996 - Raúl Ruiz winner, Critics Award
