= Raúl Ruiz (director) =

Chilean filmmaker, writer and teacher (1941-2011)

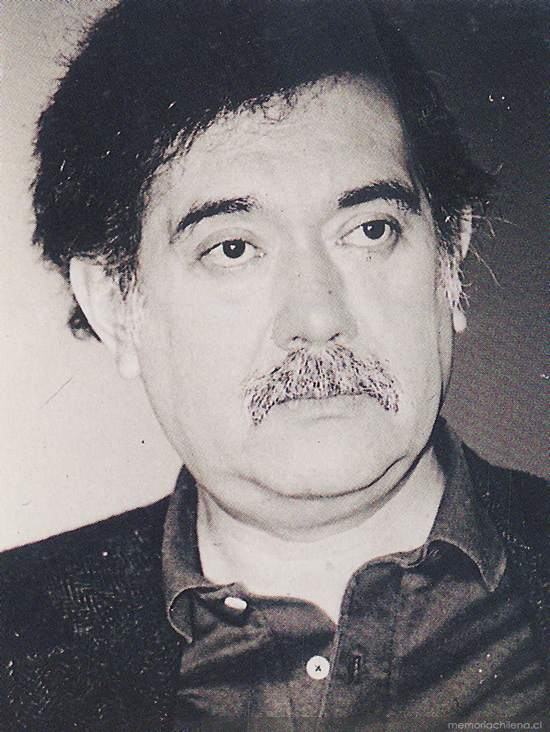
- Born: Raúl Ernesto Ruiz Pino; 25 July 1941; Puerto Montt, Chile
- Died: 19 August 2011 (aged 70); Paris, France
- Other name: Raoul Ruiz
- Education: University of Chile
- Occupation: Film director
- Years active: 1963–2011
- Style: Drama, comedy, experimental film, surrealism, fantasy
- Spouse: Valeria Sarmiento (m. 1969)

Raúl Ernesto Ruiz Pino (French: Raoul Ruiz; 25 July 1941 – 19 August 2011) was an experimental Chilean filmmaker, writer and teacher whose work is best known in France. He directed more than 100 films.

== Biography ==
The son of a ship's captain and a schoolteacher in southern Chile, Raúl Ruiz abandoned his university studies in theology and law to write 100 plays with the support of a Rockefeller Foundation grant. He went on to learn his craft working in Chilean and Mexican television and studying at film school in Argentina (1964). Back in Chile, he made his feature debut Three Sad Tigers (1968), sharing the Golden Leopard at the 1969 Locarno Film Festival. According to Ruiz in a 1991 interview, Three Sad Tigers "is a film without a story, it is the reverse of a story. Somebody kills somebody. All the elements of a story are there but they are used like a landscape, and the landscape is used like story." He was something of an outsider among the politically oriented Chilean filmmakers of his generation such as Miguel Littín and Patricio Guzmán, his work being far more ironic, surrealistic and experimental. In 1973, shortly after the military coup d'état led by Augusto Pinochet, Ruiz and his wife (fellow director Valeria Sarmiento) fled Chile and settled in Paris, France.

Ruiz soon developed a reputation among European critics and cinephiles as an avant-garde film magician, writing and directing a remarkable number of amusing, eccentric, complex, and highly literary low-to-no-budget films in the 1970s and 1980s (often for France's Institut national de l'audiovisuel and then for Portuguese producer Paulo Branco). The best known of these often oneiric, fabulist films are: Colloque de chiens (1977), a short which marked the start of Ruiz's long-term working relationship with Chilean composer Jorge Arriagada; The Suspended Vocation (1978); The Hypothesis of the Stolen Painting (1978); On Top of the Whale (1982); Three Crowns of the Sailor (1982); City of Pirates (1983); Manoel's Destinies (1985); Treasure Island (1985) and Life is a Dream (1986). A special issue of Cahiers du cinéma was devoted to Ruiz in March 1983. Between 1985 and 1989, he was the co-director of Le Havre's House of Culture.

In the 1990s, Ruiz began working with larger budgets and "name" stars like John Hurt in Dark at Noon (1992) and Marcello Mastroianni in Three Lives and Only One Death (1996). The following year, he made Genealogies of a Crime starring Catherine Deneuve, winning the Silver Bear at the 47th Berlin International Film Festival. A second major French actress, Isabelle Huppert, worked with Ruiz on Comedy of Innocence (2000), which was nominated for the Golden Lion at the Venice Film Festival. The American John Malkovich acted in the star-studded Marcel Proust adaptation Time Regained (1999) and the somewhat less successful Savage Souls (2001) and Klimt (2006). That Day (2003) was the fourth and last Ruiz film to be shown in the main competition of the Cannes Film Festival. He also made forays into the English-language mainstream with the thrillers Shattered Image (1998) and A Closed Book (2010). In the final decade of his life, Ruiz wrote and directed several low-budget productions in his native Chile, but his final international success was the Franco-Portuguese epic Mysteries of Lisbon (2010).

Ruiz claimed that he was "always trying to make this connection between different ways of producing: film, theater, installations, and videos" – he hoped his "films would have to be seen many times, like objects in the house, like a painting. They have to have a minimum of complexity." Over the years, he taught his own particular brand of film theory and practice, which he explained in his two books Poetics of Cinema 1: Miscellanies (1995) and Poetics of Cinema 2 (2007). He delivered workshops, masterclasses, lectures and seminars at many institutions, including Pontifical Catholic University of Valparaíso (1969-1972), Pontifical Catholic University of Chile (1972-1973), Le Havre's House of Culture (1985-1989), La Fémis (1988), the École cantonale d'art de Lausanne (1988), Harvard University (1989-1990), Francisco José de Caldas District University (1993), Palermo's Albergo dei Poveri (1994), Duke University (1994 and 1996), Brussels' Centre International de Formation des Arts du Spectacle (2003), the University of Aberdeen's Centre for Modern Thought (2007-2009), and the University of Calabria (2008).

Ruiz died in August 2011 as a result of complications from a lung infection, having successfully undergone a liver transplant in early 2010 after being diagnosed with a life-threatening tumour. The Presidents of France and Chile both praised him. The Church of Saint George-Paul in Paris held a memorial service which was attended by many notable friends, including Catherine Deneuve, Chiara Mastroianni, Melvil Poupaud, Paulo Branco, Arielle Dombasle, Michel Piccoli and Jorge Edwards. Ruiz's body was then returned to Chile to be buried as specified in his will and a National Day of Mourning was declared in Chile.

== Legacy ==
Ruiz's final completed feature Night Across the Street (2012) was selected to be screened posthumously in the Directors' Fortnight section of the 2012 Cannes Film Festival. His widow Valeria Sarmiento, who was also his collaborator and frequent editor for several decades, completed Lines of Wellington (2012), the Napoleonic epic that Ruiz was preparing when he died and the film was in competition for the Golden Lion at the 69th Venice International Film Festival and as a Zabaltegi Special at the 2012 San Sebastián International Film Festival. Both films were also shown at the 2012 Toronto International Film Festival and the 2012 New York Film Festival.

In 2014, the Pontifical Catholic University of Valparaíso's Institute of Art created the Ruiz-Sarmiento Archive in Viña del Mar to collect documentation and promote knowledge of the work of the filmmaker couple. The archive holds manuscript, bibliographical and audiovisual materials which can be consulted by artists and researchers.

On 25 July 2014, Serpentine Galleries in London launched "Pirates and Disappearances: A Homage to Raúl Ruiz", a weekend of Ruiz-related talks and screenings. The most complete retrospective yet of Ruiz's work took place at the Cinémathèque française in Paris between 30 March and 30 May 2016. Another retrospective commemoration was held at Lincoln Center in New York City which ran during the week ending 22 December 2016 with Part 2 in February 2018. The next major retrospective took place at the Viennale from October 2023 to January 2024 and was followed by another at the Cinemateca Portuguesa in February 2024. In late 2025, two further retrospectives will take place at the Filmoteca de Catalunya and the Cineteca Madrid.

The feature film The Wandering Soap Opera, which Ruiz had shot in Chile in 1990 but left unfinished, was completed by Sarmiento and premiered at the Locarno Film Festival in August 2017. Ruiz's feature debut The Tango of the Widower and its Distorting Mirror, filmed in 1967 but shelved following budgetary problems, was restored by Sarmiento for a February 2020 premiere in the 70th Berlin International Film Festival.

Image from Realismo socialista

A third Ruiz film, Socialist Realism as One of the Fine Arts, has been restored and completed by Sarmiento for its official premiere in 2023. Ruiz was not able to give the film a final edit as a result of the Chilean coup in 1973 and it was presumed lost for many years. A fifty-minute rough cut was shown at the Valdivia International Film Festival in 2008, but four-and-a-half hours of footage was recovered from the archives of Duke University in 2016.

== Awards ==
- Three Sad Tigers tied with three other films for the 1969 Golden Leopard award at the Locarno Film Festival.
- 1979 César Award for best plot for a short film, for Colloque de chiens.
- Three Crowns of the Sailor won the Perspectives du Cinéma Award at the Cannes Film Festival (1983).
- Guggenheim Fellowship for Creative Arts-Film (1983).
- Manoel's Destinies won the KNF Award at the Rotterdam International Film Festival (1985).
- Three Lives and Only One Death (1996) won the Critics Award at the São Paulo International Film Festival.
- Genealogies of a Crime (1997) won the Silver Bear at the 47th Berlin International Film Festival.
- Chile's National Prize for Performing and Audiovisual Arts (1997)
- FIPRESCI Prize at the Montréal World Film Festival in 2000 "for brilliantly exploring the range of narrative possibilities of the cinema and celebrating and demonstrating the art of storytelling through the ages" in Love Torn in a Dream.
- At the Montréal World Film Festival (2002), Cofralandes, Chilean Rhapsody won the Glauber Rocha Award for the Best Film from Latin America and a FIPRESCI Prize "for the director's personal exploration into his homeland, using DV in a rigorous yet playful manner".
- Master of Cinema prize at the Mannheim-Heidelberg International Filmfestival (2003).
- Klimt won the Russian Film Clubs Federation Award at the 28th Moscow International Film Festival (2006).
- Master of Cinema prize at the Rome Film Festival (2007).
- Mysteries of Lisbon (2010) won the Silver Shell for Best Director at the San Sebastián International Film Festival, the Louis Delluc Prize for best French film and Critics Award for best film at the São Paulo International Film Festival.
- Posthumous Special Award at the 2011 New York Film Critics Circle Awards.

== Filmography ==
- La maleta (1963) – short film lost and completed in 2008
- Le retour (1964) – unfinished short film
- El tango del viudo y su espejo deformante [The Tango of the Widower and its Distorting Mirror] (1967) – unfinished and restored for a 2020 release
- Tres tristes tigres [Three Sad Tigers] (1968)
- La catanaria (1969)
- Militarismo y tortura (1969) – short film
- La colonia penal [The Penal Colony] (1970)
- Ahora te vamos a llamar hermano (1971) – short film
- Nadie dijo nada (1971)
- ¡Qué hacer! (1972)
- Los minuteros (1972) – short film
- Poesía popular: La teoría y la práctica (1972) – short film
- Abastecimiento (1973) – short film
- Palomita blanca [Little White Dove] (1973)
- Realismo socialista como una de las bellas artes [Socialist Realism] (1973) - unfinished and restored for a 2023 release
- Palomita brava (1973) – short film
- La expropiación [The Expropriation] (1974)
- Diálogos de exiliados [Dialogues of Exiles] (1975)
- Sotelo (1976) – short film
- Utopia (1976)
- Colloque de chiens (1977) – short film
- Les divisions de la nature (1978) – short film
- La vocation suspendue [The Suspended Vocation] (1978)
- L'hypothèse du tableau volé [The Hypothesis of the Stolen Painting] (1978)
- Petit manuel d'histoire de France (1979)
- Dog’s Dialogue (1979)
- Jeux (1979)
- De grands événements et de gens ordinaires [Of Great Events and Ordinary People] (1979)
- Images de débat (1979)
- Zig-Zag – le jeu de l'oie (une fiction didactique à propos de la cartographie) (1980) – short film
- La ville nouvelle (1980) – short film
- Fahlstrom (1980) – short film
- Musée Dali (1980)
- L'image en silence (1980)
- Le borgne (1980)
- Teletests (1980) – short film
- The Territory (1981)
- Images de sable (1981) – short film
- Ombres chinoises (1982) – short film
- Querelle des jardins (1982) – short film
- Le petit théâtre (1982) – short film
- Het dak van de Walvis [On Top of the Whale] (1982)
- Les trois couronnes du matelot [Three Crowns of the Sailor] (1982)
- Lettre d'un cinéaste ou Le retour d'un amateur de bibliothèques [Letter from a Library Lover] (1983) – short film
- La ville des pirates [City of Pirates] (1983)
- Bérénice (1983)
- La ville de Paris (1983)
- Voyages d'une main (1984)
- Point de fuite [Vanishing Point] (1984)
- Les destins de Manoel [Manoel's Destinies/Manoel on the Island of Marvels] (1984)
- L'Île au trésor [Treasure Island] (1985)
- La présence réelle (1985)
- Régime sans pain (1985)
- L'éveillé du pont de l'Alma [The Insomniac on the Bridge] (1985)
- Richard III (1986)
- Mémoire des apparences [Life is a Dream] (1986)
- Dans un miroir (1986)
- Mammame (1986)
- Brise-glace (1987)
- La chouette aveugle [The Blind Owl] (1987)
- Le professeur Taranne (1987)
- Allegoria (1988)
- Tous les nuages sont des horloges (1988)
- Il pozzo dei pazzi (1989) – short film
- Derrière le mur (1989)
- Hub (1989)
- The Golden Boat (1990)
- La telenovela errante [The Wandering Soap Opera] (1990) – unfinished feature completed by Sarmiento and released in 2017
- A TV Dante (Cantos 9–14) (1991)
- Las soledades (1992) – short film
- L'oeil qui ment [Dark at Noon] (1992)
- Fado majeur et mineur [Fado, Major and Minor] (1994)
- Wind Water (1995) – short film
- Trois vies et une seule mort [Three Lives and Only One Death] (1996)
- Généalogies d'un crime [Genealogies of a Crime] (1997)
- Le film à venir (1997) – short film
- Shattered Image (1998)
- Le temps retrouvé [Time Regained] (1999)
- Comédie de l'innocence [Comedy of Innocence] (2000)
- Combat d'amour en songe [Love Torn in a Dream] (2000)
- Les Âmes fortes [Savage Souls] (2001)
- Miotte vu par Raúl Ruiz (2002)
- Cofralandes, rapsodia chilena [Cofralandes, Chilean Rhapsody] (2002)
- Ce jour-là [That Day] (2003)
- Une place parmi les vivants [A Place Among the Living/A Taste for Murder] (2003)
- Vertige de la page blanche [Vertigo of the Blank Page] (2003)
- Días de campo [Days in the Country] (2004)
- Le domaine perdu [The Lost Domain] (2005)
- Klimt (2006)
- Le Don (2007) – short film
- La Recta Provincia (2007)
- Litoral (2008)
- La maison Nucingen [Nucingen House] (2008)
- Agathopedia (2008)
- El pasaporte amarillo [The Yellow Passport] (2009)
- A Closed Book [Blind Revenge] (2010)
- L'estate breve (2010)
- Mistérios de Lisboa [Mysteries of Lisbon] (2010)
- Ballet aquatique (2011)
- La noche de enfrente [Night Across the Street] (2012)

== Bibliography ==
- Raoul Ruiz; Benoît Peeters; Patrick Deubelbeiss (1989). Le Transpatagonien (in French). Casterman. ISBN 2203380144. Translated into Spanish as: Raúl Ruiz; Benoît Peeters (1995). El Transpatagónico. Grijalbo Mondadori. ISBN 956-262-097-2. Translated from the French by Cristóbal Santa Cruz.
- Raoul Ruiz (1990). Le livre des disparitions (in French). Dis Voir. ISBN 2906571180. Translated into English as: Raul Ruiz (2005). The Book of Disappearance & The Book of the Tractions. Dis Voir. ISBN 2914563191.
- Raoul Ruiz (1992). Le Convive de pierre (in French). Actes Sud. ISBN 2869431643.
- Raoul Ruiz (1995). Poétique du cinéma (in French). Dis Voir. ISBN 2-906571-37-7. Translated into English as: Raul Ruiz (1995). Poetics of Cinema 1: Miscellanies. Dis Voir. ISBN 2-906571-38-5. Translated from the French by Brian Holmes. Translated into Spanish as: Raúl Ruiz (2000). Poética del cine. Editorial Sudamericana. ISBN 956-262-097-2. Translated from the French by Waldo Rojas.
- Raoul Ruiz (1999). Entretiens (in French). Editions Hoebeke. ISBN 2842300823.
- Raoul Ruiz (2006). Poétique du cinéma 2 (in French). Dis Voir. ISBN 978-2-914563-27-7. Translated into English as: Raul Ruiz (2007). Poetics of Cinema 2. Dis Voir. ISBN 978-2-914563-25-3. Translated from the Spanish by Carlos Eduardo Morreo.
- Raoul Ruiz (2008). A la poursuite de l'île au trésor (in French). Dis Voir. ISBN 978-2-914563-39-0. Translated into English as: Raul Ruiz (2008). In Pursuit of Treasure Island. Dis Voir. ISBN 978-2-914563-41-3. Translated from the French by Paul Buck and Catherine Petit.
- Raúl Ruiz (2012). L'esprit de l'escalier (in French). Fayard. ISBN 9782213644363. Translated into English as: Raul Ruiz (2012). The Wit of the Staircase. Dis Voir. ISBN 978-2914563727. Translated from the French by Paul Buck and Catherine Petit.
- Raúl Ruiz (2013). Poéticas del cine (in Spanish). Ediciones Universidad Diego Portales (UDP). ISBN 978-956-314-218-1. Sections translated from the French by Alan Pauls.
- Raúl Ruiz (2017). Diario. Notas, recuerdos y secuencias de cosas vistas (in Spanish). Ediciones Universidad Diego Portales (UDP). Selection, editing and prologue by Bruno Cuneo.
- Raúl Ruiz (2019). Duelos y quebrantos (in Spanish). Mundana Ediciones. Edited by Bruno Cuneo.
- Raúl Ruiz (2021). A Nine-Year-Old Aviator. Dis Voir. ISBN 978-2-914563-99-4. Translated from the Spanish by Paul Buck and Catherine Petit. Illustrations by Camila Mora Scheihing.
- Raúl Ruiz (2023). Edipo hiperbóreo. Una antología de fábulas sobre el exilio y la tiranía (in Spanish). Overol. ISBN 9789566137269. Translated into Spanish and edited by Elisa Chaim.
- Raúl Ruiz (2024). Escritos repartidos (in Spanish). Ediciones Universidad Diego Portales (UDP). ISBN 978-956-314-582-3. Selections by Bruno Cuneo.
