= The Suspended Vocation =

1978 film

- Film poster
- Directed by: Raúl Ruiz
- Written by: Raúl Ruiz; Pierre Klossowski
- Starring: Didier Flamand
- Cinematography: Maurice Perrimond; Sacha Vierny
- Edited by: Valeria Sarmiento
- Music by: Jorge Arriagada
- Distributed by: Institut national de l'audiovisuel
- Release date: 1978
- Running time: 90 minutes
- Country: France
- Language: French

The Suspended Vocation (French: La vocation suspendue) is a 1978 French drama film directed by Chilean filmmaker Raúl Ruiz. It is a free adaptation of the perverse theological 1950 novel of the same name by Pierre Klossowski.

== Plot ==
The film centers on a Dominican friar named Jérôme (played by one actor in colour and another actor in black-and-white) and his interactions with various higher-ups within the French Catholic Church.

== Cast ==
- Didier Flamand as Jérôme # 1
- Pascal Bonitzer as Jérôme # 2
- Daniel Gélin as Malagrida
- Édith Scob as Angélique
- Gabriel Gascon as The father-confessor
- Geneviève Mnich as Sister Théophile
- Maurice Bénichou as Member of the Devotion # 1
- Pascal Kané as The member of Devotion # 2
- Alexandre Tamar as Member of Devotion # 3
- Jean Badin as L'ami
- Huguette Faget as The Seller of Statues
- Jean Rougeul as Euthanasien Persienne
- Françoise Vercruyssen as The Woman
- Jean Lescot as The Father-Master # 1
- Marcel Imhoff as The Father-Master # 2
- Daniel Isoppo as The lay brother
- Isidro Romero as The Prior # 1
- Gérard Berner as The Prior # 2
- Éric Burnelli as The Painter Brother
- Jean-Robert Viard as Bishop (as Jean Robert Viard)
- Paul-Eric Shulmann as Child (as Paul-Eroc Schulman)
- Sylvie Herbert as Sister Vincent
- Raoul Guillet as The Superior
- Jean Frapat as The black abbot
