= Valeria Sarmiento =

Film editor

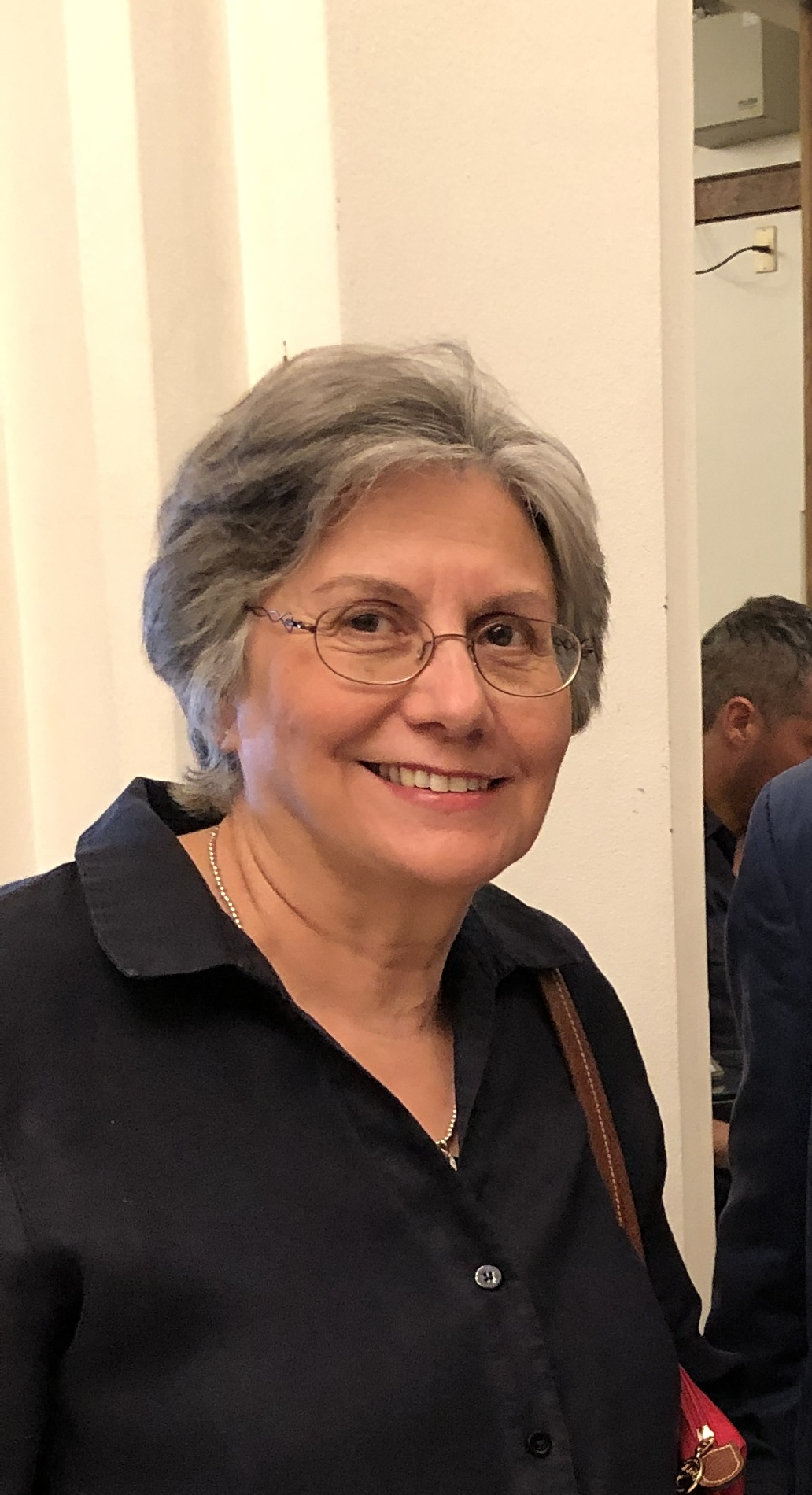
- Born: 29 October 1948 (age 77); Valparaíso, Chile
- Education: University of Chile
- Occupations: Film editor, director, screenwriter
- Years active: 1972–present
- Style: Drama, comedy, experimental film
- Spouse: Raúl Ruiz (m. 1969; died 2011)

Valeria Sarmiento (born 29 October 1948) is a film editor, director and screenwriter best known for her work in France, Portugal and her native Chile. She has worked both in film and television, directing 20 feature films, documentaries and television series'. She is the widow of Chilean film director Raúl Ruiz (1941-2011) with whom she collaborated for decades as regular editor and co-writer. She has also edited films for Luc Moullet, Robert Kramer and Ventura Pons and is a Guggenheim Fellow (1988).

== Biography ==
Sarmiento was born in the Chilean municipality of Valparaíso and was first exposed to film at the age of five, becoming familiar with the work of Orson Welles, Alfred Hitchcock and others. She rarely saw French films due to censorship but, thanks to what she refers to as a "moment of magic", was able to watch Jean-Luc Godard's Breathless (1960) at the age of twelve. She went on to study film and philosophy at the University of Valparaíso and married filmmaker Raúl Ruiz in 1969. In 1974, the couple were forced to move to Paris due to the 1973 Chilean coup d'état of Augusto Pinochet.

Sarmiento made her directorial debut with the documentary Un sueño como de colores (1972) about a group of Chilean women dedicated to striptease. Her later work as a director, usually in melodrama, romantic drama and costume drama, has also often featured strong female characters who face machismo and sexism. Her debut feature Notre mariage (1984) was a Grand Prix winner for Best New Director at the San Sebastián International Film Festival, her 1991 film Amelia Lópes O'Neill was entered into the 41st Berlin International Film Festival and her Napoleonic war epic Lines of Wellington competed for the Golden Lion at the 69th Venice International Film Festival.

A symposium on Sarmiento's feminism was held at Stanford University in May 2008, the Cinémathèque Française ran a Sarmiento retrospective in October 2018, and a Ruiz/Sarmiento retrospective will take place at the Filmoteca de Catalunya in October 2025.

== Filmography ==
Year	Title	Role			
Year	Title	Director	Screenwriter	Editor	Actor
1972	Un sueño como de colores	Yes			
1972	Poeísa popular: la teoría y la práctica	Yes		Yes	
1972	Los minuteros	Yes		Yes	
1972	The Expropriation			Yes	
1975	Dialogues of Exiles			Yes	Yes
1977	Dog's Dialogue			Yes	
1978	Genèse d'un repas			Yes	
1978	The Suspended Vocation			Yes	
1979	Le mal du pays	Yes		Yes	
1979	Gens du nulle part, gens de toutes parts	Yes	Yes	Yes	
1980	La borgne			Yes	
1980	Guns			Yes	
1981	The Territory			Yes	
1982	On Top of the Whale			Yes	
1982	El hombre cuando es hombre	Yes	Yes		
1983	Les minutes d'un faiseur de film			Yes	
1983	Three Crowns of the Sailor			Yes	
1983	City of Pirates			Yes	
1984	7 faux raccords			Yes	
1984	Notre mariage	Yes	Yes		
1985	Voyage d'une main			Yes	Yes
1985	Treasure Island			Yes	
1987	Brise-glace			Yes	
1990	The Blind Owl			Yes	
1990	Amelia Lópes O'Neill	Yes	Yes		
1994	Viaggio clandestino - Vite di santi e di peccaroti			Yes	
1995	Wind Water			Yes	
1995	Elle	Yes			
1997	Le film à venir			Yes	
1997	Genealogies of a Crime			Yes	
1998	L'inconnu de Strasbourg	Yes	Yes		
1998	Carlos Fuentes: Un voyage dans les temps	Yes			
2000	Love Torn in a Dream			Yes	
2001	Savage Souls			Yes	
2002	Rosa la china	Yes	Yes		
2003	That Day			Yes	
2003	A Place Among the Living			Yes	
2004	Edipo			Yes	
2005	The Lost Domain			Yes	
2006	Klimt			Yes	
2008	Secrets	Yes	Yes		
2010	A Closed Book			Yes	
2010	Mysteries of Lisbon			Yes	
2012	Lines of Wellington (conceived by Ruiz, shot by Sarmiento)	Yes			
2013	Maria Graham: Diary of a Residence in Chile	Yes			
2017	The Wandering Soap Opera (shot by Ruiz in 1990, completed by Sarmiento)	Yes			
2018	The Black Book of Father Dinis	Yes			
2020	The Tango of the Widower (shot by Ruiz in 1967, completed by Sarmiento)	Yes			

== Bibliography ==
- Bruno Cuneo and Fernando Pérez V. (eds.) Una mirada oblicua. El cine de Valeria Sarmiento (Universidad Alberto Hurtado, 2021) ISBN 9789563573015
- Elizabeth Ramírez and Catalina Donoso (eds.) Nomadías. El cine de Marilú Mallet, Valeria Sarmiento y Angelina Vásquez (Ediciones Metales Pesados, 2016) ISBN 9568415882, ISBN 9789568415884
