= Oneiric (film theory) =

Film theory term

In film theory, the term oneiric (/oʊˈnaɪrɪk/ oh-NY-rik, adjective; "pertaining to dreams") refers to the depiction of dream-like states or to the use of the metaphor of a dream or the dream-state in the analysis of a film. The term comes from the Greek Óneiros, the personification of dreams.

== History ==
Early film theorists such as Ricciotto Canudo (1879–1923) and Jean Epstein (1897–1953) argued that films had a dreamlike quality. Raymond Bellour and Guy Rosolato have made psychoanalytical analogies between films and the dream state, claiming films as having a "latent" content that can be psychoanalyzed as if it were a dream. Lydia Marinelli states that before the 1930s, psychoanalysts "primarily attempted to apply the interpretative schemata found in Sigmund Freud's Interpretation of Dreams to films."

Author Douglas Fowler surmises that "images arising from dreams are the well spring of all our efforts to give enduring form and meaning to the urgencies within," seeing this as the reason why "the deep structure of human narrative is conceived in dreams and the genesis of all myth is dreams." Author Robert Eberwein describes the filmic experience as the merging of a viewer's consciousness with the projected consciousness of the screen's subject, a process whereby the viewer's prior experiences with dreaming "help to create a sense of oneness" with cinema, causing the gap between viewer and what is being viewed to narrow. Under this theory, no matter what is being shown on the screen — whether the literal representation of a character dreaming, or the fictional characters of a story going on about their fictional lives — the very process of viewing film itself "replicates activities associated with the oneiric experience."

Films and dreams are also connected in psychological analysis by examining the relationship between the cinema screening process and the spectator (who is perceived as passive). Roland Barthes, a French literary critic and semiotician, described film spectators as being in a "para-oneiric" state, feeling "sleepy and drowsy as if they had just woken up" when a film ends. Similarly, the French surrealist André Breton argues that film viewers enter a state between being "awake and falling asleep", what French filmmaker René Clair called a "dreamlike state". Jean Mitry's first volume of Esthétique et psychologie du cinéma (1963) also discuss the connection between films and the dream state.

== Filmmakers ==
Filmmakers described as using oneiric or dreamlike elements in their films include:

- Sergei Parajanov (e.g., Shadows of Forgotten Ancestors)
- David Lynch (e.g., Twin Peaks, Mulholland Drive)
- Andrei Tarkovsky (e.g. Andrei Rublev, Solaris)
- Stan Brakhage (e.g., Dog Star Man)
- Michelangelo Antonioni (e.g. The Passenger, Zabriskie Point)
- Jaromil Jireš (e.g., Valerie and Her Week of Wonders)
- Krzysztof Kieslowski (e.g. The Double Life of Veronique)
- Federico Fellini (e.g., Amarcord)
- Francis Ford Coppola (e.g., Apocalypse Now)
- Ingmar Bergman (e.g., Wild Strawberries)
- Jean Cocteau (e.g., Orphic Trilogy)
- Gaspar Noé (e.g. Enter the Void, Love, Climax)
- Raúl Ruiz (e.g., City of Pirates)
- Edgar G. Ulmer (e.g., The Black Cat)
- Jacques Tourneur (e.g., I Walked With a Zombie)
- Maya Deren (e.g., Meshes of the Afternoon)
- Wojciech Has
- Kenneth Anger

== See also ==
- Bertram D. Lewin
- Experimental film
- Art film
