= List of Chilean films =

This is an index listing Chilean films ordered by year of release.

== 1900s ==
Title	Director	Cast	Genre	Notes
1903
Un paseo a Playa Ancha	Maurice Albert Massonnier		Silent/Documentary	

== 1920s ==
Title	Director	Cast	Genre	Notes
1920
Cuando Chaplin enloqueció de amor	Pedro J. Malbrán	María Leyton, Pedro J. Malbrán, Nemesio Martínez	Silent	
Uno de abajo	Armando Rojas Castro	Tulio Amaro, Hugo Beltrán, Edmundo Donar	Silent/drama	
1921
Los Payasos se van	Pedro Sienna	Rafael Frontaura, Victor Domingo Silva, Pedro Sienna	Silent	
1922
Hombres de esta tierra	Carlos F. Borcosque	Luis Vicentini, Jorge Infante, Ketty Zambelli	Silent	
El Triunfo de la Ciencia	Gustavo Bussenius	Eduardo Cosil, Nemesio Martínez	Silent/Drama	
1923
Traición	Carlos F. Borcosque	María Brieba, Yvonne D'Albert, Jorge Infante	Silent	
1924
Esclavitud	Alberto Santana	Enrique Campos, Augusto Cassasús	Silent/drama	
Vida y milagros de Don Fausto	Carlos F. Borcosque		Animated silent comedy	
1925
Las Chicas de la Avenida Pedro Montt	Alberto Santana	Luis Cárdenas, Carlos Gajardo	Silent/drama	
Diablo fuerte	Carlos F. Borcosque	Luis Vicentini	Silent	
El Húsar de la muerte	Pedro Sienna	Pedro Sienna, Piet Van Ravenstein, Clara Werther, María de Hanning, Dolores Anziani, Hugo Silva, Piet van Ravebstein, Luis Baeza	Silent/drama	
Malditas serán las mujeres	Rosario Rodriguez de la Serna	Hilda Blancheteaux, Juan Gross, Vicenta de Yáñez, Germán Pimstein	Silent/Drama	
Martín Rivas	Carlos F. Borcosque	Juan Cerecer, Jorge Infante, Rafael Larson||Silent||		
La Última trasnochada	Pedro Sienna	Juan Cerecer, Rafael Frontaura, Pepe Martínez, Adriana Morel	Silent/drama	
1926
Los Cascabeles de Arlequín	Alberto Santana	Edmundo Fuenzalida, Mercedes Gibson, Plácido Martín	Silent/drama	
El huérfano	Carlos F. Borcosque	María Borcosque and Luis Rojas Müller	Silent short	
1927
1928
1929
La Envenenadora	Rosario Rodriguez de la Serna	Hilda Blancheteaux, Juan Gross, Elena Ovalle, Ida Ruby	Drama	

== 1930s ==
Title	Director	Cast	Genre	Notes
1930
Una Canción de Amor	Juan Pérez Berrocal	Carlos Christi, Rafael Duque, Luis Morales	Silent/drama	Black and white
1931
Patrullas de Avanzada	Eric Page	Carlos Christi, Antonio Márquez	Silent	Black and white
1932
1933
1934
Norte y Sur	Jorge Délano	Alejandro Flores, María Llopart, Juan Padilla	Drama	Black and white
1935
1936
1937
1938
1939
Dos corazones y una tonada	Carlos García Huidobro	Blanca Arce, Rafael Frontaura, María Teresa León	Drama	Black and white
Hombres del sur	Juan Pérez Berrocal	Luisita Aguirrebeña, Helia Grandón, Juan Pérez Berrocal	Drama	Black and white

== 1940s ==
Title	Director	Cast	Genre	Notes
1940
Escándalo	Jorge Délano	Mario Gaete, Patricio Kaulen, Gloria Lynch	Drama	Black and white
1941
La Chica del Crillón	Jorge Délano	Blanca Arce, Conchita Buxón, Poncho Merlet		Black and white
1942
15 mil dibujos	Carlos Trupp, Jaime Escudero			Black and white
Nada más que amor	Patricio Kaulen	Alberto Closas		
1943
1944
1945
Casamiento por poder	José Bohr	Rolando Caicedo, Alejandro Lira, Cora Díaz	Drama	
The House Is Empty	Carlos Schlieper	Chela Bon, Alejandro Flores		
1946
Father Cigarette	Roberto de Ribón		Comedy	
The Lady of Death	Carlos Hugo Christensen	Carlos Cores, Judith Sulian, Guillermo Battaglia		
The Maharaja's Diamond	Roberto de Ribón	Luis Sandrini		
1947
La dama de las camelias	José Bohr	Ana González Olea, Hernán Castro Oliveira, Lucy Lanny, Alejandro Lira, Héctor Quintanilla, Juan Corona, José Pi Cánovas	Comedy	
Si mis campos hablaran	José Bohr			Entered into the 1954 Cannes Film Festival
1948
1949
La cadena infinita	José Bohr	Sara Guasch, Ricardo Moller, Eduardo Naveda, Carmen Bravo Osuna, Marlene Aguilera, Arturo Gatica	Comedy	

== 1950s ==
Title	Director	Cast	Genre	Notes
1950
1951
One Who's Been a Sailor	José Bohr	Eugenio Retes, Hilda Sour		
The Last Gallop	Luis A. Morales, Enrique Soto Toro			
1952
The Idol	Pierre Chenal	Alberto Closas, Elisa Galvé, Florence Marly		
1953
Blood Conflict	Vinicio Valdivia	Marcela Benítez, Carmen Bunster		
1954
Confesiones al amanecer	Pierre Chenal	Lautaro Murúa, Emilio Martinez, Florence Marly	Drama	Argentina-Chile co-production
1955
El gran circo Chamorro	José Bohr	Eugenio Retes, Rafael Frontaura, Malú Gatica, Gerardo Grez, Doris Guerrero, Pepe Guixé	Comedy/drama	
1956
1957
1958
La Caleta olvidada	Bruno Gebel			Entered into the 1958 Cannes Film Festival
1959

== 1960s ==
Title	Director	Cast	Genre	Notes
1960
1961
1962
1963
La maleta	Raúl Ruiz			Ruiz's first film
1964
1965
La pérgola de las flores	Román Viñoly Barreto	Beatriz Bonnet	Comedy	Argentina-Chile-Spain co-production Entered into the 4th Moscow International Film Festival
1966
1967
Morir un poco	Álvaro Covacevich		Documentary	
Largo viaje	Patricio Kaulen	Enrique Kaulen, Eliana Vidal, Fabio Zerpa	Drama	
Traitors of San Angel	Leopoldo Torre Nilsson	Ian Hendry, Lautaro Murúa, Graciela Borges		International co-production
1968
Ayúdeme usted compadre	Germán Becker	Los Perlas, Los Huasos Quincheros, Pedro Messone, Fresia Soto	Musical	Entered into the 6th Moscow International Film Festival
Tres tristes tigres	Raúl Ruiz	Luis Alarcón, Fernando Colina, Delfina Guzmán, Shenda Román, Jaime Vadell, Nelson Villagra	Drama	
1969
Valparaíso mi amor	Aldo Francia	Hugo Cárcamo, Sara Astica, Liliana Cabrera, Marcelo, Rigoberto Rojo, Pedro Manuel Alvarez	Drama	
El chacal de Nahueltoro	Miguel Littín	Nelson Villagra, Shenda Román, Luis Melo, Ruben Sotoconil, Armando Fenoglio	Drama	Entered into the 20th Berlin International Film Festival
Volver	Germán Becker	Rita Góngora, Pedro Vargas, Zulma Yugar		
Caliche sangriento	Helvio Soto			

== 1970s ==
Title	Director	Cast	Genre	Notes
1970
La casa en que vivimos	Patricio Kaulen	Carmen Barros, Tennyson Ferrada, Leonardo Perucci	Drama	Black and white
¡Qué hacer!	Raúl Ruiz			Chile-United States co-production
La Colonia Penal	Raúl Ruiz	Luis Alarcón, Mónica Echeverría, Aníbal Reyna, Nelson Villagra	Drama	
1971
Nadie dijo nada	Raúl Ruiz			
Ya no basta con rezar	Aldo Francia	Marcelo Romo, Tennyson Ferrada, Leonardo Ferrucci	Drama	
1972
The Expropriation	Raúl Ruiz			
1973
Palomita Blanca	Raúl Ruiz	Beatriz Lapido, Rodrigo Ureta, Luis Alarcón	Drama	Not released until 1992
El realismo socialista	Raúl Ruiz	Marcial Edwards, Javier Maldonado	Drama	
The Promised Land	Miguel Littín			Entered into the 8th Moscow International Film Festival
1974
A la sombra del sol	Silvio Caiozzi, Pablo Perelman		Drama	
1975
Dialogues of Exiles	Raúl Ruiz			Chile-France co-production
La batalla de Chile: La insurrección de la burguesía	Patricio Guzmán		Documentary	
1976
La batalla de Chile: El golpe de Estado	Patricio Guzmán		Documentary	Chile-Cuba co-production
1977
Julio comienza en julio	Silvio Caiozzi	Luis Alarcón, Schlomit Baytelman, Juan Cristóbal Meza, Gloria Münchmeyer, Felipe Rabat	Drama	
1978
La batalla de Chile: El poder popular	Patricio Guzmán		Documentary	
1979

== 1980s ==
Title	Director	Cast	Genre	Notes
1980
1981
1982
Presencia lejana	Angelina Vásquez		Documentary	
1983
El último grumete	Jorge López Sotomayor	Teresita Rivas, Gonzalo Meza, Domingo Tessier, Enrique Heine, Corita Díaz	Adventure	
1984
1985
1986
Acta General de Chile	Miguel Littín		Documentary	
1987
1988
Sussi	Gonzalo Justiniano	Marcela Osorio	Comedy	
1989

== 1990s ==
Title	Director	Cast	Genre	Notes
1990
Caluga o menta	Gonzalo Justiniano	Hector Vega Mauricio, Patricia Rivadeneira, Aldo Parodi, Myriam Palacios	Drama	
La luna en el espejo	Silvio Caiozzi	Luis Alarcón, Schlomit Baytelman, Juan Cristóbal Meza, Gloria Münchmeyer	Drama	
Sandino	Miguel Littín	Kris Kristofferson, Joaquim de Almeida, Dean Stockwell, Ángela Molina	Drama	
Gentille Alouette	Sergio Castillo	Geraldine Chaplin		Chile-France co-production
1991
Amelia Lópes O'Neill	Valeria Sarmiento			Entered into the 41st Berlin International Film Festival
La Frontera	Ricardo Larraín	Patricio Contreras, Gloria Laso, Alonso Venegas, Héctor Noguera, Aldo Bernales	Drama	Won a Silver Bear at the 42nd Berlin International Film Festival
Chile in Transition	Gaston Ancelovici, Frank Diamand		Documentary	
1992
Raíz de Chile Mapuche Aymara	David Benavente		Documentary	
1993
Johnny cien pesos	Gustavo Graef-Marino	Armando Araiza, Patricia Rivera, Willy Semler, Aldo Parodi, Rodolfo Bravo, Boris Quercia, Sergio Hernández	Drama	
1994
Amnesia	Gonzalo Justiniano			
Los Náufragos	Miguel Littín	Marcelo Romo, Valentina Vargas, Luis Alarcón, Bastián Bodenhofer	Drama	Screened at the 1994 Cannes Film Festival
1995
Agüita heladita	Nicolás Acuña	César Robinsón López, Mario Ossandón, César Robinzon López	Short	
Ahuyentando El Temporal	Nelson Cabrera, Luis Costa		Documentary	
1996
El encierro	Marcelo Ferrari	César Abarzua, Pablo Schwarz	Short	
1997
Chile, Obstinate Memory (Chile, la memoria obstinada)	Patricio Guzmán		Documentary	Chilean, Canadian, Belgian, German and French coproduction
Historias de fútbol	Andrés Wood	Armando Cavieres, Nora Escobar, Fernando Gallardo, Rodrigo González	Drama	
1998
Takilleitor	Daniel de la Vega	Luis Dimas, Alejandra Fosalba, Sergio Hernández, Patricia Rivadeneira	Comedy	
Gringuito	Sergio Castilla	Catalina Guerra, Mateo Iribarren, Alejandro Goic, Sebastian Pérez	Drama	
Fernando ha vuelto	Silvio Caiozzi		Documentary	
El entusiasmo	Ricardo Larraín	Maribel Verdú, Álvaro Escobar, Carmen Maura, Álvaro Rudolphy	Drama	
The Last Stand of Salvador Allende (11 de septiembre de 1973. El último combate de Salvador Allende)	Patricio Henríquez		Documentary	
1999
El Desquite	Andrés Wood	Tamara Acosta, Willy Semler, María Izquierdo, Camila García, Bélgica Castro	Drama	
El Chacotero Sentimental	Cristian Galaz	Daniel Muñoz, Lorente Prieto, Sergio Schmied, Fernando Farias, Martin Salinas	Comedy	
18 en el parque	Andrés Waissbluth		Documentary	
Valparaíso en el corazón	Gaston Ancelovici		Documentary	

== 2000s ==
Title	Director	Cast	Genre	Notes
2000
Monos con navaja	Stanley Gonczanski	Carola Fadic, Alvaro Espinoza	Drama	Screened at the 2000 Huelva Film Festival
Bastardos en el paraíso	Luis Vera	Camilo Alanís, Lotta Kalge, Daniel Ojala, María Elena Cavieres, Pablo Vera Nieto, Raquel Baeza, Freddy Bylund, Patricio Zamorano	Drama	
Ángel Negro	Jorge Olguín	Álvaro Morales, Blanca Lewin, Andrea Freund, Juan Pablo Bastidas, Fernando Gallardo, Álvaro Espinoza	Terror	
Aquí se construye	Ignacio Agüero		Documentary	
Tierra del Fuego	Miguel Littín			Screened at the 2000 Cannes Film Festival
Coronation	Silvio Caiozzi			Chile's submission to the 73rd Academy Awards for the Academy Award for Best Foreign Language Film
El bonaerense	Pablo Trapero			International co-production
2001
La fiebre del loco	Andrés Wood	Tamara Acosta, Emilio Bardi, Loreto Moya, María Izquierdo, Luis Dubo, Julio Marcone, Luis Margani	Drama	
Chacabuco, memoria del silencio	Gaston Ancelovici		Documentary	
Te amo, made in Chile	Sergio Castilla	Adrián Castilla, Daniela Ropert, Joshua Walker, Emiliana Araya	Drama	
Taxi para tres	Orlando Lübbert	Alejandro Trejo, Fernando Gómez-Rovira, Daniel Muñoz, Elsa Poblete	Comedy/drama	
Piel Canela	Cristian Mason	Paz Bascuñán, Benjamín Vicuña, Daniel Alcaíno, Solange Lackington	Comedy/drama	
I Love Pinochet	Marcela Said		Documentary	
Chico	Ibolya Fekete			International co-production
2002
Ogú y Mampato en Rapa Nui	Alejandro Rojas		Animation	
Estadio Nacional	Carmen Parot		Documentary	
Sangre Eterna	Jorge Olguín	Juan Pablo Ogalde, Blanca Lewin, Patricia López, Carlos Borquez	Horror	
2003
B-Happy	Gonzalo Justiniano	Manuela Martelli, Eduardo Barril, Lorene Prieto	Drama	
Bombardeo de La Moneda	Pablo Alvarado Aretio		Documentary	
Cesante	Ricardo Amunategui	Coco Legrand, Yasmín Valdés, Gonzalo Robles, Cristián García-Huidobro, Christián Mejía, Fredy Guerrero, Claudio Reyes, Katyna Huberman, Natalia Cuevas, Vanessa Miller, Fernando Larraín, Liliana Ross, Luis Dubó, Patricia Irribarra, Juan Andrés Salfate	Comedy	Winner – Best Chilean Film at the Valdivia International Film Festival
The Chosen One (El nominado)	Nacho Argiro & Gabriel Lopez	Sebastián Layseca, Francisco Reyes, María Elena Swett, Cristián de la Fuente	Slasher	
Los Debutantes	Andrés Waissbluth	Antonella Ríos, Néstor Cantillana, Juan Pablo Miranda, Alejandro Trejo	Drama	
Sexo con Amor	Boris Quercia	Patricio Contreras, Sigrid Alegría, Catalina Guerra, María Izquierdo, Álvaro Rudolphy, Berta Lasala	Sex comedy	
Underground (Subterra)	Marcelo Ferrari	Francisco Reyes, Berta Lasala, Paulina Gálvez, Gabriela Medina, Héctor Noguera, Mariana Loyola	Drama	
XS: The Worst Size (XS, la peor talla)	Jorge López Sotomayor	Benjamín Vicuña, Gonzalo Valenzuela, Nicolás Saavedra, María Elena Swett, Florencia Romero, Cristóbal Tapia-Montt, Álvaro Uccelletti, Domingo Guzmán, Malucha Pinto, Sandra Arriagada, Jaime Capó, Otilio Castro, Sebastián Dahm, Felipe Hurtado, Juan Luis León, Diego López, Víctor Mix, Eduardo Banchieri	Comedy	
Silvia's Gift	Dionisio Pérez	Bárbara Goenaga, Luis Tosar, Víctor Clavijo		Chile-Portugal-Spain co-production
2004
Machuca	Andrés Wood	Ariel Mateluna, Matías Quer, Manuela Martelli	Drama	
Cachimba	Silvio Caiozzi	Pablo Schwarz, Mariana Loyola, Julio Jung, Jesús Guzmán	Comedy	
Mi mejor enemigo	Alex Bowen	Erto Pantoja, Nicolás Saavedra, Felipe Braun, Miguel Dedovich	Comedy/drama	
Mujeres Infieles	Rodrigo Ortúzar Lynch	Sigrid Alegría, Lucía Jiménez, Gabriela Aguilera, Benjamín Vicuña, Daniel Alcaíno	Drama	
Promedio Rojo	Nicolás López	Ariel Levy, Nicolás Martínez, Xenia Tostado, Benjamín Vicuña	Comedy	
Salvador Allende	Patricio Guzmán		Documentary	Screened at the 2004 Cannes Film Festival
Actores secundarios	Pachi Bustos, Jorge Leiva		Documentary	
Bad Blood	León Errázuriz			Won the Horizons Award at 52nd San Sebastián International Film Festival
Days in the Country	Raúl Ruiz			Chile-France co-production
The Motorcycle Diaries	Walter Salles			International co-production
2005
Se arrienda	Alberto Fuguet	Luciano Cruz-Coke, Felipe Braun, Francisca Lewin, Ignacia Allamand, Jaime Vadell, Diego Casanueva, Benjamín Vicuña	Drama	
In Bed	Matías Bize	Blanca Lewin, Gonzalo Valenzuela	Drama	
The King of San Gregorio	Alfonso Gazitúa	Pedro Vargas, María José Pargas, Gloria Münchmeyer, Andrés Rillón, José Sosa, Giselle Demelchiore, José Miguel Jiménez	Romantic drama	
La última luna	Miguel Littín	Ayman Abu Alzulof, Alejandro Goic, Tamara Acosta, Francisca Merino	Drama	Entered into the 27th Moscow International Film Festival
Parentesis	Francisca Schweitzer, Pablo Solis	Francisco Pérez-Bannen, Sigrid Alegría, Carolina Castro, Luis Gnecco	Drama	
Play	Alicia Scherson	Viviana Herrera, Andrés Ulloa, Aline Kuppenhein, Coca Guazzini	Drama	
Secuestro	Gonzalo Lira	Rodrigo Bastidas, Marcela Del Valle, Pablo Díaz, Paola Falcone	Drama	
El baño	Gregory Cohen			
2006
Fuga	Pablo Larraín	Benjamín Vicuña, Gastón Pauls, Alfredo Castro, Francisca Imboden	Drama	
Kiltro	Ernesto Díaz Espinoza	Marko Zaror	Martial arts, Action	
El rey de los huevones	Boris Quercia	Boris Quercia, Angie Jibaja, Rhandy Pinango, Tamara Acosta	Comedy	
Padre nuestro	Rodrigo Sepulveda Urzúa	Jaime Vadell, Francisco Pérez-Bannen, Amparo Noguera, Luis Gnecco	Drama	
El Pejesapo	José Luis Sepúlveda	Hector Silva, Alicia De Melo, Jose Melo, Jessica Calderon, Barbarella Foster, Yanni Escobar	Drama	
Pretendiendo	Claudio Dabed	Bárbara Mori, Marcelo Mazzarello, Amaya Forch, Gonzalo Robles	Romantic comedy	
Forbidden to Forbid	Jorge Durán	Caio Blat, Maria Flor, Alexandre Rodrigues		Brazil-Chile-Spain co-production
2007
The Toast (El brindis)	Shai Agosin	Ana Serradilla, José Soriano, Francisco Melo, Pablo Krögh	Romance, Comedy-drama	
Casa de remolienda	Joaquín Eyzaguirre	Amparo Noguera, Paulina García, Tamara Acosta, Luz Valdivieso, Daniel Muñoz, Alfredo Castro, Daniela Lhorente, Claudio Arredondo, Francisca Eyzaguirre, Luis Gnecco, Claudio Valenzuela, Álvaro Espinoza, Andrés Eyzaguirre, Luis Bravo, Carlos Belmar, Wilson Fuentes, Osvaldo Salom, Jorge Topp, Consuelo Castillo, Pamela Pacheco, Carlos Montenegro, Loreto Vuskovic	Drama	Winner – Best Cinematography, Best Art Direction & Best Costume Design at the Pedro Sienna Awards Nominated – Best Picture, Best Actress for Amparo Noguera and Paulina Garcia & Best Makeup at the Pedro Sienna Awards
Chile puede	Ricardo Larraín	Willy Semler, Alvaro Rudolphy, Javiera Contador, Boris Quercia, Hugo Arana, Bélgica Castro	Comedy	
Papelucho y el Marciano	Alejandro Rojas Téllez	Marina Huerta, Leyla Rangel, Carlos del Campo, Cecilia Gómez, Maggie Vera, Nayelí Solis, Ana Paula Fogarty, Adrián Fogarty, Mario Castañeda	Comedy	
Fiestapatria	Luis Vera	Adela Secall, Nelson Brodt, Tiago Correa, Marcela Osorio, Rosa Ramírez, Tatiana Astengo	Drama	Nominated – Horizons Award at the San Sebastián International Film Festival Winner – Best Actress for Marcela Osorio at the Ibero-American Film Festival of Santa Cruz Winner – Best Director at the Trieste Latin American Film Festival Nominated – Colón de Oro at the Havana New Latin American Film Festival Winner – Best Actress for Marcela Osorio at the Pedro Sienna Award Nominated – Best Supporting Performance for Patricio Contreras & Best Costume Design at the Pedro Sienna Award
Life Kills Me (La vida me mata)	Sebastián Silva	Diego Muñoz, Amparo Noguera, Gabriel Díaz, Claudia Celedón, Catalina Saavedra, Ramón Llao, Alejandro Sieveking, Marcial Tagle, Roberto Farías, Luz Valdivieso, Bélgica Castro, Isidora Quer, Maricarmen Arrigorriaga, María Eugenia Barrenechea, Sebastián Silva, Pedropiedra, Pablo Schwarz	Comedy-drama	
Microfilia	Nehoc Davis	Julio Briceño, Isabel Leal Cartes, Marcia del Canto, Teresa Hales, Domingo Ravanal	Comedy	
Mirageman	Ernesto Díaz Espinoza	Marko Zaror, María Elena Swett, Ariel Mateluna, Mauricio Pesutic, Iván Jara, Jack Arama, Gina Aguad, Eduardo Castro, Pablo Díaz, Francisco Castro, Juan Pablo Miranda, Gabriela Sobarzo, Arturo Ruiz-Tagle, Paula Leoncini, Juan Pablo Aliaga, Sofia Salas, Wernher Schurmann, Salvador Allende, Víctor González, Alfredo Tello, Jorge Lillo, Lucky Buzzio, Constanza Meza-Lopehandia, Nicolás Ibieta	Superhero, Martial arts	Winner – Best Feature – Bronze Medal & Audience Award at the 3rd Fantastic Fest Winner – Best Chilean Feature Film – Audience Award at the Valdivia International Film Festival Nominated – Best Picture & Best Supporting Actor for Iván Jara at the Pedro Sienna Awards
Radio Corazón	Roberto Artiagoitía	Manuela Martelli, Amparo Noguera, Tamara Acosta	Comedy	
Scrambled Beer (Malta con huevo)	Cristóbal Valderrama	Diego Muñoz, Nicolás Saavedra, Javiera Díaz de Valdés, Manuela Martelli, Patricio Díaz, Mariana Derderián, Aline Küppenheim, Alejandra Vega, Cristina Peña y Lillo, Rodrigo Salinas, Álvaro Salinas, Camilo Torres, Lucia Baeza, Isolda Cid, Clemente Echavarry, Paula Bravo, Javiera Hernández, Francisco González Hermosilla	Science fiction, Comedy	Winner – Audience Award at the Film Festival of the North of Chile Winner – Best Screenplay at the Pedro Sienna Awards Nominated – Best Director, Best Soundtrack, Best Art Direction, Best Makeup & Best Special Effects at the Pedro Sienna Awards
2008
199 Tips to Be Happy (199 recetas para ser feliz)	Andrés Waissbluth	Pablo Macaya, Tamara Garea, Andrea García-Huidobro	Drama	
Mansacue	Marco Enríquez-Ominami	Cristián Riquelme, Dayana Amigo, Luis Dubó, Patricio Strahovsky, Carolina Oliva, Fernando Gómez Rovira, Claudia Pérez, Mauricio Pesutic	Comedy	
Muñeca	Sebastián Arrau	Benjamín Vicuña, Marcial Tagle, Andrés Sáiz, Ana Fernández, María de Los Ángeles García, Catalina Guerra, Francisco Neculman, Hector Cabrera	Drama	Winner – Great Paoa – Best National Film & Marcial Tagle at the 20th Viña del Mar International Film Festival.
Optical Illusions (Ilusiones ópticas)	Cristián Jiménez	Ivan Alvarez de Araya, Gregory Cohen, Samuel González	Comedy-drama	
Perdido	Alberto Fuguet	Pablo Cerda, Mirella Pascual	Adventure, Drama	
El regalo	Cristián Galaz & Andrea Ugalde	Nelson Villagra, Jamie Vadell, Julio Jung, Delfina Guzmán and Gloria Munchmeyer	Romantic comedy	
Tony Manero	Pablo Larraín	Alfredo Castro, Paola Lattus, Elsa Poblete	Drama	
31 minutos, la película	Álvaro Díaz, Pedro Peirano		Animation	Brazil-Chile-Spain co-production
Agustín's Newspaper	Ignacio Agüero		Documentary	
All Inclusive	Rodrigo Ortuzar Lynch			Chile-Mexico co-production
Descendents	Jorge Olguín		Horror	
Nucingen House	Raúl Ruiz			Chile-France-Romania co-production
Santos	Nicolás López	Javier Gutiérrez, Elsa Pataky, Leonardo Sbaraglia, Guillermo Toledo		Chile-Spain co-production
The Good Life	Andrés Wood			International co-production Won the 2008 Goya Award for Best Spanish Language Foreign Film
The Sky, the Earth and the Rain	José Luis Torres Leiva		Drama	
2009
The Maid (La nana)	Sebastián Silva	Catalina Saavedra, Claudia Celedón, Alejandro Goic	Comedy-drama	Winner of Sundance Grand Jury Prize (World Cinema – Dramatic), and Special Jury Prize (World Cinema – Dramatic); nominated for Golden Globe; winner of at least 27 other festival awards
You Think You're the Prettiest, But You Are the Sluttiest (Te creís la más linda (pero erís la más puta))	Che Sandoval	Martin Castillo, Camila Le-Bert, Francisco Braithwaite, Andrea Riquelme, Grimanesa Jiménez, Eduardo Cruz, Paula Bravo, Che Sandoval, Sebastián Brahm, Bárbara Rebolledo	Comedy	Winner – Best Fiction Feature Film at the La Plata Latin American Film Festival Winner – Best Actor for Martín Castillo at the Pedro Sienna Awards Nominated – Best Director, Best Supporting Actress for Grimanesa Jiménez & Best Editing at the Pedro Sienna Awards
Christmas	Sebastián Lelio	Manuela Martelli, Diego Ruiz, Alicia Rodríguez		Chile-France co-production
Dawson Isla 10	Miguel Littin			
Estilo Hip Hop			Documentary	International co-production
Huacho	Alejandro Fernández Almendras			
Humanimal	Francesc Morales			
The Dancer and the Thief	Fernando Trueba			Chile-Spain co-production

== 2010s ==
Title	Director	Cast	Genre	Notes
2010
Drama	Matias Lira	Isidora Urrejola, Eusebio Arenas, Diego Ruiz, Benjamín Vicuña, Fernanda Urrejola	Drama	Winner, Work in Progress, Habana Film Festival
The Life of Fish	Matías Bize	Santiago Cabrera	Drama	Winner, Best Spanish Language Film at the 25th Goya Awards
Post Mortem	Pablo Larraín	Alfredo Castro, Antonia Zegers	Drama	
Fuck My Life	Nicolás López	Ariel Levy		
La Esmeralda 1879	Elías Llanos	Fernando Godoy, Jaime Omeñaca		
My Last Round	Julio Jorquera	Roberto Farías, Héctor Morales		Argentina-Chile co-production
Nostalgia for the Light	Patricio Guzmán		Documentary	International co-production
Old Cats	Sebastián Silva	Bélgica Castro, Claudia Celedón	Drama	
2011
El circuito de Román	Sebastian Brahm	Cristián Carvajal, Paola Giannini, Alexis Moreno	Drama	Premiered at Toronto International Film Festival 2011
Violeta se fue a los cielos	Andrés Wood	Francisca Gavilán	Drama	World Cinema Jury Prize (Dramatic) at the 2012 Sundance Film Festival
Población Obrera	Rodrigo Fernández		Documentary	Seleccionado en FIDOC 2015 y SANFIC 2015
03:34: Earthquake in Chile	Juan Pablo Ternicier	Andrea Freund, Marcelo Alonso, Loreto Aravena		
4:44 Last Day on Earth	Abel Ferrara	Willem Dafoe, Shanyn Leigh, Natasha Lyonne, Paul Hipp		International co-production
Bonsai	Cristián Jiménez		Drama	
Metro cuadrado	Nayra Ilic		Drama	
Summer	José Luis Torres Leiva	Rosario Bléfari	Drama	
The Year of the Tiger	Sebastián Lelio	Luis Dubó, Sergio Hernández	Drama	
Ulysses	Oscar Godoy	Jorge Román, Francisca Gavilán		Argentina-Chile co-production
2012
Su nombre era Chile y que él era el distribuidor más bonito de drogas	James Ard		Documentary	
Joven y Alocada	Marialy Rivas		Drama	Sundance Film Festival Award (Screenwriting)
No	Pablo Larraín	Gael García Bernal, Alfredo Castro, Luis Gnecco, Antonia Zegers	Historical drama	First Chilean film to be nominated for an Academy Award for Best Foreign Language Film
Thursday Till Sunday	Dominga Sotomayor Castillo	Santi Ahumada, Emiliano Freifeld and Paola Giannini	Drama	Winner of multiple awards including the International Film Festival's Rotterdam Tiger Award (Grand Prize), Honorable Mention at Los Angeles Film Festival
Partir to live	Domingo García-Huidobro			
7 Sea Pirates	Walter Tournier		Animation	Argentina-Chile-Uruguay co-production
Aftershock	Nicolás López	Eli Roth, Andrea Osvárt, Ariel Levy, Natasha Yarovenko		Chile-United States co-production
Bring Me the Head of the Machine Gun Woman	Ernesto Díaz Espinoza	Fernanda Urrejola		
Hidden in the Woods	Patricio Valladares			
Night Across the Street	Raúl Ruiz	Christian Vadim, Sergio Hernández	Drama	
Things as They Are	Fernando Lavanderos			
Thursday Till Sunday	Dominga Sotomayor Castillo	Francisco Pérez-Bannen		
2013
Gloria	Sebastián Lelio	Paulina García		Entered into the 63rd Berlin International Film Festival
The Summer of Flying Fish	Marcela Said	Gregory Cohen, Francisca Walker, María Izquierdo		Premiered at the 2013 Cannes Film Festival
The Quispe Girls	Sebastián Sepúlveda	Catalina Saavedra		Entered into the Venice Film Festival
The Dance of Reality	Alejandro Jodorowsky	Brontis Jodorowsky, Pamela Flores, Alejandro Jodorowsky		Screened at the 2013 Cannes Film Festival
Crystal Fairy & the Magical Cactus	Sebastián Silva	Michael Cera, Gaby Hoffmann		
Illiterate	Moisés Sepúlveda	Paulina García, Valentina Muhr	Drama	
Magic Magic				Chile-United States co-production
The Green Inferno	Eli Roth			International co-production
The Magnetic Tree	Isabel de Ayguavives	Andrés Gertrúdix		Chile-Spain co-production
2014
To Kill a Man	Alejandro Fernández Almendras	Daniel Antivilo, Daniel Candia, Ariel Mateluna	Drama	With France; entered into the International Film Festival Rotterdam
Hijo de Trauco	Alan Fischer	Luis Dubó, María Izquierdo, Alejandro Trejo, Xabier Usabiaga, Daniela Ramírez, Daniel Antivilo, Juan Pablo Miranda	Drama, Adventure	Premiered at the 35th La Havana International Film Festival
Allende en su laberinto	Miguel Littin			
Aurora	Rodrigo Sepúlveda	Amparo Noguera	Drama	
Bear Story	Gabriel Osorio Vargas		Animation	Won the Oscar for Best Animated Short Film at the 88th Academy Awards
I Am Not Lorena	Isidora Marras	Loreto Aravena, Paulina García		
Redeemer	Ernesto Díaz Espinoza	Marko Zaror, Noah Segan		
The Guest	Mauricio López Fernández	Daniela Vega		
The Stranger	Guillermo Amoedo	Cristóbal Tapia Montt, Ariel Levy, Lorenza Izzo		
Voice Over	Cristián Jiménez	Ingrid Isensee		Selected to be screened at the 2014 Toronto International Film Festival
2015
Beyond My Grandfather Allende	Marcia Tambutti			
The Club	Pablo Larraín	Alfredo Castro, Roberto Farías, Antonia Zegers	Drama	Premiered at the 65th Berlin International Film Festival
In the Grayscale (En la Gama de los Grises)	Claudio Marcone	Francisco Celhay, Daniela Ramirez, Emilio Edwards	Drama	
Inside the Mind of a Psychopath (El Tila: Fragmentos de un psicópata)	Alejandro Torres	Nicolás Zárate, Daniela Ramírez, Rodrigo Soto, Daniel Alcaíno, Fabián Sanhueza, Jorge Becker, Tiare Pino, Rodrigo Alarcón, Norma Araya, Jeanette Castillo, Gladys de Sanhueza, Teresa Díaz, Christopher Estay, Sebastián Echeverría, Damaris Torres, Ignacio Echegoyen, Trinidad González, Barbara Vera, Alejandro Montes, Bárbara Santander	Psychological thriller	Winner – Best Actor for Nicolás Zárate at the 11th Santiago International Film Festival Nominated – Best Leading Actor for Nicolás Zárate & Best Supporting Actress for Trinidad González at the Caleuche Awards
The Pearl Button	Patricio Guzmán		Documentary	
Sex Life of Plants (Vida sexual de las plantas)	Sebastián Brahm	Francisca Lewin, Mario Horton, Ingrid Isensee, Cristián Jiménez, Nataly Varillas, Gloria Laso, Gabriela Aguilera, Nathalie Nicloux, Alejandro Hernández, Andrés Almeida, José Palma, Bernardo Quesney, Manuel Figueroa, Mauricio Dávila	Romantic drama	Winner – New Directors Award – Special Mention at the 63rd San Sebastián International Film Festival
Chicago Boys	Carola Fuentes, Rafael Valdeavellano		Documentary	
He Hated Pigeons	Ingrid Veninger		Drama	Canada-Chile co-production
Knock Knock	Eli Roth	Keanu Reeves, Lorenza Izzo, Ana de Armas		
Land and Shade	César Augusto Acevedo			International co-production
Lost Queens	Ignacio Juricic		Short	
Lusers	Ticoy Rodríguez	Carlos Alcántara, Felipe Izquierdo, Pablo Granados		Argentina-Chile-Peru co-production
Nasty Baby	Sebastián Silva	Kristen Wiig, Sebastián Silva, Tunde Adebimpe		Chile-United States co-production
The 33	Patricia Riggen	Antonio Banderas, Rodrigo Santoro, Juliette Binoche, James Brolin		International co-production
The Memory of Water	Matías Bize	Elena Anaya, Benjamín Vicuña, Néstor Cantillana		Won the Colón de Oro for best director at the 2015 Festival de Cine Iberoamericano de Huelva
Toro Loco Sangriento	Patricio Valladares			
2016
The Blind Christ	Christopher Murray			
Jesús	Fernando Guzzoni			
Neruda	Pablo Larraín	Luis Gnecco, Gael García Bernal, Alfredo Castro	Biographical drama	Internationally co-produced; premiered at the 2016 Cannes Film Festival
You'll Never Be Alone (Nunca vas a estar solo)	Álex Anwandter	Antonia Zegers, Sergio Hernández	Drama	
Chameleon	Jorge Riquelme Serrano			
Downhill	Patricio Valladares	Natalie Burn		
Endless Poetry	Alejandro Jodorowsky	Alejandro Jodorowsky, Brontis Jodorowsky, Adán Jodorowsky		Chile-France co-production
Jackie	Pablo Larraín	Natalie Portman		International co-production
Much Ado About Nothing	Alejandro Fernández Almendras		Drama	
No Filter	Nicolás López	Paz Bascuñán, Antonio Quercia		
Rara	Pepa San Martín	Julia Lübbert, Mariana Loyola		Argentina-Chile co-production
2017
Cielo	Alison McAlpine		Documentary	Chile-Canada co-production
The Desert Bride	Cecilia Atán, Valeria Pivato	Paulina García, Claudio Rissi		With Argentina; premiered at the 2017 Cannes Film Festival
Los Perros	Marcela Said	Antonia Zegers, Alfredo Castro		Premiered at the 2017 Cannes Film Festival
A Fantastic Woman	Sebastian Lelio	Daniela Vega, Francisco Reyes		Winner the Best Foreign Language Film Oscar in 2018
And Suddenly the Dawn	Silvio Caiozzi	Julio Jung, Sergio Hernández		Selected as the Chilean entry for the Best Foreign Language Film at the 91st Academy Awards
Condorito: la película	Alex Orrelle, Eduardo Schuldt	Omar Chaparro, Jéssica Cediel, Cristián de la Fuente	Animation	International co-production
Do It Like an Hombre	Nicolás López	Mauricio Ochmann, Alfonso Dosal, Aislinn Derbez		Chile-Mexico coproduction
Family Life	Alicia Scherson, Cristián Jiménez		Drama	
Here's the Plan	Fernanda Frick H.		Animation	
Oblivion Verses	Alireza Khatami	Juan Margallo		International co-production
The Family	Gustavo Rondón Córdova			Chile-Norway-Venezuela co-production
The Wandering Soap Opera	Raúl Ruiz, Valeria Sarmiento	Luis Alarcón, Patricia Rivadeneira, Francisco Reyes		Filmed in 1990
2018
Altiplano	Malena Szlam			Canada-Chile co-production
Dry Martina	Che Sandoval	Antonella Costa, Patricio Contreras		
Gloria Bell	Sebastián Lelio	Julianne Moore, John Turturro, Michael Cera		Chile-United States co-production English language remake of Lelio's 2013 film Gloria
Marilyn	Martín Rodríguez Redondo			Argentina-Chile co-production
The Wolf House	Cristobal León & Joaquín Cociña		Animation	
Too Late to Die Young	Dominga Sotomayor Castillo		Drama	
2019
The Cordillera of Dreams (La cordillera de los sueños)	Patricio Guzmán		Documentary	In co-production with France Winner – Golden Eye at the 72nd Cannes Film Festival Nominated – Best Documentary Film at the 45th César Awards Winner – Best Ibero-American Film at the 36th Goya Awards
Hecho bolsa	Felipe Izquierdo	Felipe Izquierdo, Bélgica Castro, Julio Jung, Erick Polhammer, Francisca Imboden, Fernando Larraín	Comedy	
Homeless	Jorge Campusano, José Ignacio Navarro & Santiago O'Ryan	Iván Fernández, Elliot Leguizamo, Bernardo Rodríguez, Sebastian Rosas, Emiliano Vanosa, Gerardo Vázquez	Science fiction, Satire, Black comedy	In co-production with Argentina It is based on the television series of the same name by José Ignacio Navarro
The Journey of Monalisa (El viaje de Monalisa)	Nicole Costa	Iván Monalisa Ojeda	Documentary	In co-production with The United States Winner – Best Documentary at the Bilbao Zinegoak International Film Festival Winner – Best National Feature Film at the Docs Valparaíso International Documentary Film Festival Winner – National Feature Film Competition – Honorable Mention at the La Serena International Film Festival Winner – Best Documentary Feature Film at the LesGaiCineMad, Madrid International LGBT Film Festival
Lemebel	Joanna Reposi Garibaldi	Pedro Lemebel	Documentary	
Lina from Lima	María Paz González	Magaly Solier, Emilia Ossandon, Herode Joseph, Betty Villalta, Exequiel Alvear, James González, Cecilia Cartasegna, Edgardo Castro, Javiera Contador, Sebastián Brahm, Alberto Tenorio, Domitila Castillo, Ingrid Cevallos, Miguel Perea, Ítalo Suárez, Brian Montalvo, Diego Olivares, Ricardo León, Camilo Toro, Catalina Aros, Geraldine Raud, Félix Acosta, Liliana Meza	Drama	An international co-production with Peru and Argentina Winner – Best Chilean Feature Film & Héctor Ríos Award – Best Direction of Photography at the Valdivia International Film Festival Nominated – Best Ibero-American Film at the Mar del Plata International Film Festival Winner – Best Actress for Magaly Solier at the Chilean Film Festival Winner – Best Art Direction, Best Male Cast & Best Actress for Magaly Solier at the Quilpué Chilean Film Festival Winner – Best Film in co-production with Argentina at the Argentinean Film Critics Association Awards
The Man of the Future (El hombre del futuro)	Felipe Ríos Fuentes	José Soza, Antonia Giesen, Sergio Hernández, Rubén Redlich, Roberto Farías, Amparo Noguera, Giannina Fruttero, Jorge Arecheta, Erto Pantoja, Solange Lackington, María Alché, Nicolás Rojas, Luis Uribe	Drama, Road Movie	Nominated – Crystal Globe at the 54th Karlovy Vary International Film Festival Winner – Special Jury Mention – Promising New Talent for Antonia Giesen at the 54th Karlovy Vary International Film Festival Nominated – Best International Film at the Santiago International Film Festival
The Prince (El principe)	Sebastián Muñoz	Alfredo Castro, Juan Carlos Maldonado, Gastón Pauls	Drama	
Ema	Pablo Larraín	Gael García Bernal, Mariana di Girolamo, Paula Luchsinger		Premiered at the Venice Film Festival
Shakti	Martín Rejtman		Short	Argentina-Chile co-production
Some Beasts	Jorge Riquelme Serrano	Paulina García, Alfredo Castro		
Spider	Andrés Wood	María Valverde, Mercedes Morán		Argentina-Brazil-Chile co-production Selected as the Chilean entry for the Best International Feature Film at the 92nd Academy Awards
The Strong Ones	Omar Zúñiga Hidalgo			
White on White	Théo Court			Chile-Spain co-production Selected as the Chilean entry for the Best International Feature Film at the 94th Academy Awards

== 2020s ==
Title	Original Title	Director	Cast	Genre	Notes
2020
Bad Neighbor	Mal vecino	Ricardo Jara		Documentary	Winner – Best Feature Film – Audience Award at the Patagonia Eco Film Fest Winner – Best Editing for Ricardo Jara & Marcela Nieto at the Rengo International Film Festival Nominated – Green Screen Latin America at the Cali Environmental Film Festival Winner – Best Film in the Territorial Gaze at the Viña del Mar International Film Festival
Forgotten Roads	La nave del olvido	Nicol Ruiz Benavides	Rosa Ramírez, Romana Satt, Gabriela Arancibia, Claudia Devia, Raúl López Leyton, Cristóbal Ruiz, María Carrillo, María José Benavides, Hugo Chamorro, Gunther Butter	Romantic drama	Winner – Best Film with a Genre Perspective & Best Director at the Huelva Ibero-American Film Festival
Jailbreak Pact	Pacto de fuga	David Albala	Benjamín Vicuña, Roberto Farías, Víctor Montero, Francisca Gavilán, Amparo Noguera, Diego Ruiz, Eusebio Arenas, Mateo Iribarren, Willy Semler, Patricio Contreras, Roberto Peña, Pablo Teillier, Gonzalo Canelo, Luis Dubó, Hugo Medina	Action, Thriller	
Karnawal		Juan Pablo Félix	Alfredo Castro, Martin López Lacci, Mónica Lairana, Diego Cremonesi, Adrián Fondari, Sergio Prina, José Luis Arias, Ángel Apolonio Cruz, Fernando Lamas Ventura	Coming-of-age, Drama	An international co-production with Argentina, Bolivia, Brazil, Mexico and Norway
Kill Pinochet	Matar a Pinochet	Juan Ignacio Sabatini	Daniela Ramírez, Cristián Carvajal, Juan Martín Gravina, Gastón Salgado, Julieta Zylberberg, Gabriel Cañas, Mario Horton, Luis Gnecco, Alejandro Goic	Thriller, Drama	Nominated – Best Ibero-American Debut Film at the 8th Platino Awards
The Mole Agent	El agente topo	Maite Alberdi		Documentary	Nominated – Best Documentary Feature at the 93rd Academy Awards
My Tender Matador	Tengo miedo torero	Rodrigo Sepúlveda	Alfredo Castro, Leonardo Ortizgris, Amparo Noguera	Drama	Based on Pedro Lemebel's novel of the same name
Nahuel and the Magic Book	Nahuel y el Libro Mágico	Germán Acuña Delgadillo	Consuelo Pizarro, Vanesa Silva, Sebastian Dupont, Muriel Benavides, Jorge Lillo, Marcelo Liapiz, Sergio Schmied, Sandro Larenas	Adventure, Drama, Fantasy, Coming-of-Age	Winner of Chilemonos in 2020 and the Tokyo Anime Award Festival in 2021
Nobody Knows I'm Here	Nadie sabe que estoy aquí	Gaspar Antillo	Jorge Garcia, Millaray Lobos, Nelson Brodt, Juan Falcón, Julio Fuentes	Drama	
The Promise of Return	La promesa del retorno	Cristián Sánchez Garfias	Natalia Martínez, Manuel Hübner, José Ignacio Diez, Anderson Tudor, Beatriz Carillo, Rafael Jean François, Daniel Pérez	Fantasy, Mystery	Nominated – American Competition – Best Picture at the Buenos Aires Independent Film Festival Nominated – Iberoamerican Competition – Best Picture at the Alternative Lima Festival
Songs of Repression	Cantos de represión	Estephan Wagner & Marianne Hougen-Moraga		Documentary	An international co-production with Denmark and Netherlands
Take a Spin in the Air	Date una vuelta en el aire	Cristián Sánchez Garfias	Rodrigo González Larrondo, Cristóbal Bascuñán, Diego Madrigal, Zacarías del Río, Ana María Zabala, Camila Leppe, José Ignacio Diez, Daniel Pérez	Surrealist, Fantasy, Comedy, Thriller	Nominated – American Competition – Best Picture at the Buenos Aires Independent Film Festival Nominated – Fiction Feature Film Competition – Jury Award at the Biarritz Amérique Latine Festival
La Verónica		Leonardo Medel	Mariana Di Girolamo, Patricia Rivadeneira, Ariel Mateluna, Antonia Giesen, Willy Semler, Josefina Montané, Coco Páez, María Jesús Vidaurre	Drama	Nominated – Latin Horizons Award at the San Sebastián International Film Festival Winner – Rebels with a Cause Award at the Tallinn Black Nights Film Festival Winner – Best Actress for Mariana di Girolamo at the Aswan International Women's Film Festival Winner – Best Film & Best Performance for Mariana Di Girolamo at the North Bend Film Festival Nominated – Best Film at the 25th Lima Film Festival Winner – Signis Award & FIPRESCI Award at the International Festival of New Latin American Cinema
The Tango of the Widower and Its Distorting Mirror	El tango del viudo y su espejo deformante	Raúl Ruiz, Valeria Sarmiento			Filmed in 1967
2021
Apps		Lucio A. Rojas, Sandra Arriagada, José Miguel Zúñiga, Camilo León & Samot Márquez	Tutú Vidaurre, Clara Kovacic, Fernanda Finterbusch, León Arriagada, Néstor Cantillana, Nicolás Durán, Ignacia Uribe	Anthology, Horror, Fantasy	An international co-production with Argentina
The Eternal Moment	Sergio Larrain: el instante eterno	Sebastián Moreno	Sergio Larraín	Biographical, Documentary	Winner – National Documentary Competition – Best Film at the Valparaíso International Recovered Film Festival Winner – Best Director at the Saraqusta Film Festival
Every Man for Himself	Cada uno tiene su cada uno	Alexis Donoso	Leonardo Pizarro, Nicolás Rojas, Romina Herrera	Drama	
Fever Dream	Distancia de rescate	Claudia Llosa	María Valverde, Dolores Fonzi, German Palacios, Guillermo Pfening, Emilio Vodanovich, Guillermina Sorribes Liotta, Marcelo Michinaux, Cristina Banegas	Psychological thriller	An international co-production with Peru, Spain and United States
Gaucho Americano		Nicolás Molina	Joaquín Agüil, Victor Jara	Documentary	Nominated – International Spectrum – Best Documentary at the Hot Docs Canadian International Documentary Winner – Genziana d'Oro at the Trento Film Festival
Immersion	Inmersión	Nicolás Postiglione	Alfredo Castro, Consuelo Carreño, Michael Silva, Mariela Mignot, Alex Quevedo	Thriller	In co-production with Mexico
(Im)Patient	El pa(de)ciente	Constanza Fernández Bertrand	Héctor Noguera, Amparo Noguera, Naldy Hernández, Emilia Noguera, Diego Casanueva, Daniel Muñoz, Paola Giannini, Gabriela Aguilera	Drama	Winner – Silver Colon – Audience Award at the Huelva Ibero-American Film Festival Nominated – International Competition – Best Film at the Buenos Aires International Festival of Independent Cinema
My Brothers Dream Awake	Mis hermanos sueñan despiertos	Claudia Huaiquimilla	Iván Cáceres, César Herrera, Paulina García, Andrew Bargsted, Sebastián Ayala, Julia Lübbert, Belén Herrera, René Miranda, Joaquín Huenufil, Diego Arboleda, Luz Jiménez, Robinson Aravena, Mario Ocampo, Germán Díaz, Ariel Mateluna, Claudio Arredondo, Otilio Castro, Víctor Recabarren, Francisco Sepúlveda, Ángel Pérez, Alejandro Neira, Jorge Chambergo, Martín Maldonado, Daniel Huaiquimilla, Jonathan Saldías	Drama	Nominated – Golden Leopard at the 74th Locarno Film Festival Winner – Best Film & Héctor Ríos Award for Best Cinematography for Mauro Veloso at the Valdivia International Film Festival Winner – Best Ibero-American Fiction Film, Best Screenplay & Best Actor for Iván Cáceres at the 36th Guadalajara International Film Festival Winner – Coup de Cœur Award & Audience Award at the 34th Toulouse Latin Film Festival Nominated – Gold Hugo at the 57th Chicago International Film Festival Nominated – Best Ibero-American Film & Young Cineastes Award at the Palm Springs International Film Festival Winner – Special Mention of the Jury & Best Screenplay for Fiction Feature Films at the Las Alturas International Film Festival Nominated – Best Ibero-American Film at the 44th Ariel Award
A Place Called Dignity	Un lugar llamado Dignidad	Matías Rojas Valencia	Salvador Insunza, Hanns Zischler, Amalia Kassai, Noa Westermeyer, Luis Dubó, David Gaete, Alex Gorlich, Alejandro Goic, Giannina Fruttero, Claudia Cabezas, Paulina Urrutia, Vivian Mahler, Philippa Zu Knyphausen, Gerardo Naumann, Ignacio Solari, Christiane Diaz, Victoria De Gregorio	Drama	An international co-production with France, Colombia, Argentina and Germany Nominated – Grand Prix – Best Film at the Tallinn Black Nights Film Festival Winner – Best Director at the Huelva Latin American Film Festival
Superno		Abel Mekasha	Esubalew Nasir, Debre Libanos	Science fiction, Psychological thriller	In co-production with Ethiopia
Three Souls	Tres almas	José Guerrero Urzúa	Daniela Milla, Ermelinda Milla, Paolo Segura, Sandra Cárcamo, Alfredo Poblete, Gonzalo Jara, Danilo Palacios, Claudio Pérez	Western, Drama	It is the second film that tells the story of the Quispe sisters after The Quispe Girls (2013).
Bestia		Hugo Covarrubias			Won Best Animated Short Subject at the 49th Annie Awards
Dusk Stone	Piedra noche	Iván Fund			Argentina-Chile-Spain co-production
Wandering Heart	Errante corazón	Leonardo Brzezicki	Leonardo Sbaraglia, Miranda de la Serna, Eva Llorach		International co-production
2022
130 Children	130 hermanos	Ainara Aparici		Documentary	In co-production with Costa Rica
1976		Manuela Martelli	Aline Kuppenheim, Nicolás Sepúlveda, Hugo Medina, Alejandro Goic, Carmen Gloria Martínez, Antonia Zegers, Marcial Tagle	Drama	Nominated – Best Ibero-American Film at the 37th Goya Awards
The Announced Death of Willy Semler	La anunciada muerte de Willy Semler	Benjamin Rojo	Cuti Aste, Francisca Rojo, Willy Semler	Comedy-drama	
Blanquita		Fernando Guzzoni	Alejandro Goic, Amparo Noguera, Marcelo Alonso, Daniela Ramírez, Ariel Grandón	Drama	Chilean entry for the Best International Feature Film at the 95th Academy Awards
Burning Patience	Ardiente paciencia	Rodrigo Sepúlveda	Vivianne Dietz, Andrew Bargsted	Romantic drama	Based on the novel Ardiente paciencia (The Postman) by Antonio Skármeta.
The Cow Who Sang a Song Into the Future	La vaca que cantó una canción hacia el futuro	Francisca Alegría	Mía Maestro, Alfredo Castro, Leonor Varela, Marcial Tagle, Enzo Ferrada	Drama	An international co-production with France, United States and Germany
Fever	Fiebre	Elisa Eliash	Lautaro Cantillana Teke, Nora Catalano, Macarena Teke, Néstor Cantillana, José Soza, Tita Iacobelli, Agatha Simunovic, Luciano Jadrievich, Gabriel Urzua, Paula Zuñiga, Paula Bravo, Camilo Egaña	Family, Fantasy	Based on the 2017 short film Un poco de fiebre by Elisa Eliash
The Hunteress	Cazadora	Martín Duplaquet	Natalia Reddersen, Willy Semler, Felipe Valenzuela, Alexandra Von Hummel	Science fiction, Psychological thriller	
I’d Like You to Live My Youth Again	Me gustaría que vivieras mi juventud de nuevo	Nicolás Guzmán	Victoria Watson, Nerea Silva, Demian	Documentary	
The Invisible Girl	La pampa	Dorian Fernández-Moris	Fernando Bacilio, Luz Pinedo, Mayella Lloclla, Pamela Lloclla, Oscar Carrillo, Alain Salinas, Sylvia Majo, Gonzalo Molina, Antonieta Pari	Thriller, Drama	An international co-production with Peru and Spain
My Imaginary Country	Mi país imaginario	Patricio Guzmán	Patricio Guzmán	Documentary	In co-production with France Nominated – Golden Eye at the 75th Cannes Film Festival Winner – Best Documentary Film at the Jerusalem Film Festival Nominated – Horizons Award at the San Sebastián International Film Festival Nominated – Best Documentary at the Oslo Films from the South Festival Nominated – Best Documentary at the 10th Platino Awards
Notes For a Film	Notas para una película	Ignacio Agüero	Gustave Verniory, Alexis Maspreuve, Ignacio Agüero	Documentary	In co-production with France
Phantom Project	Proyecto fantasma	Roberto Doveris	Juan Cano, Ingrid Isensee, Violeta Castillo, Fernanda Toledo, Fernando Castillo, Yasmín Ludueñas, Natalia Grez, Rocío Monasterio, Claudio González Ravanal, Marco Carmona, Conrado Soto, Constanza Fernández, Sofía Oportot, Paloma Larraín, Tomás Abalo	Fantasy, Comedy-drama	Winner – Best Actor for Juan Cano at the Buenos Aires International Festival of Independent Cinema Nominated – Best Film at the Buenos Aires International Festival of Independent Cinema
La Provisoria		Melina Fernández da Silva & Nicolás Meta	Andrés Ciavaglia, Ana Pauls, Juan Chapur, Sol Bordigoni, Nicolás Juárez, Albertina Vázquez	Comedy-drama	An international co-production with Argentina, Brazil, Colombia & France
The Punishment	El castigo	Matías Bize	Antonia Zegers, Néstor Cantillana, Santiago Urbina, Catalina Saavedra, Yair Juri	Experimental, Fantasy, Romantic comedy	Winner – Best Actress for Antonia Zegers at the Tallinn Black Nights Film Festival; Nominated – Best Latin American Film at the Forqué Awards; Winner – Best Film & Best Actress for Antonia Zegers at the Beijing Film Festival; Nominated – Best Actress for Antonia Zegers at the 10th Platino Awards; Nominated – Best Ibero-American film at the Málaga Film Festival; Winner – Best Director at the Málaga Film Festival
Off-Lined	Desconectados	Diego Rougier	Javiera Contador, María Jesus Haran, Diego Rojas, Dayana Amigo, Jaime Vadell, Jorge Zabaleta, Carmen Gloria Bresky, Alejandro Trejo, Luis Dubó, Luz Jiménez, Gabriela Hernández, Alonso Torres, Catalina Castelblanco	Comedy	The first Chilean film produced for Amazon Prime Video
S.O.S. Mamis: La película		Gabriela Sobarzo	Loreto Aravena, Paz Bascuñán, Tamara Acosta, María Elena Swett, Jenny Cavallo, Ignacia Allamand, Ricardo Fernández Flores, Marcial Tagle, Igal Furman, Cristina Aburto, Pablo Zúñiga, Lorena Capetillo, Edison Díaz, Alondra Venezuela, Matteo Sepúlveda Silva, Santiago B. Swett, Leonor Asensio Bascuñán, Florencia Massardo Cavallo, Steffi Lutz, Jaime Bandayrel, Gabriela Sobarzo, Berni Traub, Carola Krebs, Javiera Gallo, Lina Baldessari, Fernando Alé, Chepo Sepúlveda	Comedy	
Sembrando Libertad		Benito Espinosa & Paloma Larraín	Francisco Ramírez, Daniela Núñez, Bárbara Becerra, Paloma Larraín, Beno Espinosa, Mateo Espinosa, Jimmy Águila, Sergio Burgos	Mockumentary, Comedy	
Alis		Clare Weiskopf, Nicolás van Hemelryck		Documentary	Colombia-Chile-Romania co-production
2023
30-Year-Old Toddler	Eternamente adolescente	Gonzalo Badilla	Sebastián Badilla, Sofía Graffigna, Gabriela Fuentes, Sofía Bennett, Iñaki Larraín, Sofía Bennett, Begoña Pessis, Jesu Gilli	Romantic comedy	Premiered on February 9
Analogues	Análogos	Jorge Olguín	Mónica Carrasco, Jorge Gajardo, Cindy Díaz	Science fiction, Drama	Winner – Jury Prize at the 51st CURTAS Vilagarcía International Fantastic Film Festival Winner – Best Acting Cast for Mónica Carrasco, Jorge Gajardo & Cindy Díaz at the Uruguayan Fantastic and Fear Film Festival Nominated – Best Film at the LA Festival of Cinema
El Conde		Pablo Larraín	Jaime Vadell, Gloria Münchmeyer, Alfredo Castro, Paula Luchsinger	Black comedy, Horror, Satire	Nominated – Golden Lion at the 80th Venice International Film Festival Winner – Golden Osella for Best Screenplay at the 80th Venice International Film Festival Winner – Silver Frog at the International Film Festival of the Art of Cinematography Camerimage Nominated – Best Cinematography at the IndieWire Critics Poll Nominated – Best Cinematography at the 96th Academy Awards
The Eternal Memory	La memoria infinita	Maite Alberdi	Augusto Góngora, Paulina Urrutia	Documentary	Winner – World Cinema Grand Jury Prize: Documentary Competition at the 2023 Sundance Film Festival
The Fist of the Condor	El puño del cóndor	Ernesto Díaz Espinoza	Marko Zaror, Gina Aguad, Eyal Meyer, Man Soo Yoon, José Manuel, Fernanda Urrejola	Martial arts	
History and Geography	Historia y Geografía	Bernardo Quesney	Amparo Noguera, Catalina Saavedra, Pablo Schwarz, Paloma Moreno, Paulina Urrutia, Steevens Benjamin	Comedy	Winner – Best Director & Best Performance for Amparo Noguera at the 19th Santiago International Film Festival Winner – Feature Film Competition – Best Performance at the 16th Chilean Film Festival Winner – Best National Feature Film at the 12nd Antofagasta International Film Festival Nominated – Best Picture at the 28th Lima Film Festival
The Lulú Club	Papá youtuber	Marcos Carnevale	Benjamín Vicuña, Jorge Zabaleta, Fernando Larraín, Rodrigo Muñoz, Laurita Fernández, Johanna Francella, Nayaraq Guevara, Silvina Quintanilla	Comedy-drama	In co-production with Argentina
The Movie Teller	La contadora de películas	Lone Scherfig	Bérénice Bejo, Antonio de la Torre, Daniel Brühl, Sara Becker, Alondra Valenzuela	Comedy-drama	An international co-production with Spain and France
Outsider Girls	Las demás	Alexandra Hyland	Nicole Sazo, Alicia Rodríguez, Geraldine Neary, Gabriela Arancibia, Paola Lattus, Alonso Quintero, Amalia Kassai, María Paz Grandjean, Eyal Meyer	Comedy-drama	Premiered on January 30, 2023, at the International Film Festival Rotterdam
Prison in the Andes	Penal Cordillera	Felipe Carmona	Bastián Bodenhöfer, Hugo Medina, Andrew Bargsted, Mauricio Pesutic, Alejandro Trejo, Óscar Hernández, Daniel Alcaíno, Juan Carlos Maldonado	Drama	Nominated – Sutherland Trophy at the 67th BFI London Film Festival Nominated – Golden Colon at the 49th Huelva Ibero-American Film Festival Winner – Best Performance at the 49th Huelva Ibero-American Film Festival Nominated – Ibero-American Fiction Feature Film – Best Picture at the 39th Guadalajara International Film Festival
S.O.S. Mamis 2: New Mom on the Block	S.O.S. Mamis 2: Mosquita muerta	Gabriela Sobarzo	Loreto Aravena, Paz Bascuñán, Tamara Acosta, María Elena Swett, Jenny Cavallo, Ricardo Fernández, Karla Melo, Ignacia Allamand, Igal Furman, Cristina Aburto, Leonor Asencio Bascuñán, Francisco German, Edison Díaz, Paulina Hunt as Nun, Ignacio Santa Cruz, Elías Collado	Comedy	Sequel of S.O.S. Mamis: La película (2022)
The Settlers	Los colonos	Felipe Gálvez Haberle	Camilo Arancibia, Benjamín Westfall, Alfredo Castro, Sam Spruell, Marcelo Alonso, Mishell Guaña, Mark Stanley	Western, Drama	Nominated – Un Certain Regard at the 76th Cannes Film Festival Nominated – Caméra d'Or at the 76th Cannes Film Festival Winner – FIPRESCI Prize at the 76th Cannes Film Festival Nominated – CineVision Award at the Munich International Film Festival An international co-production with Argentina, the United Kingdom, Taiwan, France, Denmark, Sweden and Germany
Sister & Sister	Las hijas	Kattia González	Ariana Chaves Gavilán, Cala Rossel Campos, Fernando Bonilla, Joshua De León, Milagros Fernández, Lía Jiménez, Gabriela Man, Angello Morales, Michelle Quiñones, Lurys Rivera, Mir Rodriguez, Seuxis Sánchez	Drama	In co-production with Panama Winner – Best Ibero-American Film at the 26th Málaga Film Festival Nominated – Ibero-American Competition – Grand Jury Prize at the 49th Seattle International Film Festival Nominated – Ibero-American Fiction Feature Film – Best Film at the 38th Guadalajara International Film Festival Nominated – New Talent Competition – Grand Prix at the Taipei Film Festival Nominated – Best Picture at the 27th Lima Film Festival
Sorcery	Brujería	Christopher Murray	Valentina Véliz, Daniel Antivilo, Sebastian Hülk, Daniel Muñoz, Neddiel Muñoz Millalonco	Fantasy, Drama	Nominated – World Film Dramatic Competition at the 2023 Sundance Film Festival An international co-production with Mexico and Germany
Thanks for Coming	Gracias por venir	Taiyo Yamazaki	Daniela Fredes, Daniel Candia, Alejandro Trejo, Alejandra Yáñez, América Navarro, Roberto Villena, Igor Cantillana	Drama	It had its commercial premiere on 26 September 2024
El vacío		Gustavo Graef-Marino	Francisco Reyes Morandé, Javiera Díaz de Valdés, Aída Caballero, Emilia Noguera, Benjamín Gallo	Romantic drama	Premiered on June 8
Sayen		Alexander Witt	Rallen Montenegro, Arón Piper, Enrique Arce	Action	
Sayen: Desert Road	Sayen: la ruta seca	Alexander Witt	Rallen Montenegro, Arón Piper, Enrique Arce	Action	
Invoking Yell		Patricio Valladares		Horror	
Malqueridas		Tana Gilbert		Documentary	Chile-Germany co-production
The Delinquents	Los delincuentes	Rodrigo Moreno			International co-production
2024
Affections	Los afectos	Diego Ayala & Aníbal Jofré	Gastón Salgado, Gianluca Abarza, Catalina Ríos, María Paz Grandjan, Claudia Cabezas, Sara Hebe, Gonzalo Robles, Rodrigo Pérez	Drama, Musical	Nominated – Chilean Competition for Best Film at the 20th Santiago International Film Festival Winner – Best Performance for Gastón Salgado at the 20th Santiago International Film Festival Nominated – Best International Fiction Feature Film at the 20th Rengo International Film Festival Winner – Best Direction in an International Feature Film Fiction & Best Performance in an International Feature Film for Gastón Salgado at the 20th Rengo International Film Festival Premiered on December 12 In co-production with Ecuador
Animalia Paradoxa		Niles Atallah	Andrea Gómez	Avant-garde, Drama, Science fiction	Winner – Best Film for National Feature Competition at the 36th Viña del Mar International Film Festival Premiered on December 5
Bitter Gold	Oro amargo	Juan Francisco Olea	Katalina Sánchez, Francisco Melo, Michael Silva, Daniel Antivilo, Moisés Angulo, Carlos Donoso, Carla Moscatelli, Matias Catalán, Carlos Rodríguez, Anibal Vásquez, Carlos Troncoso	Neo-Western, Thriller, Drama	Nominated – Warsaw Grand Prix at the 40th Warsaw Film Festival Winner – Ecumenical Jury Award at the 40th Warsaw Film Festival It had its commercial premiere on May 8, 2025, in Chilean theaters An international co-production with Germany, Mexico and Uruguay
Designation of Origin	Denominación de origen	Tomás Alzamora	Luisa Barrientos, Roberto Betancourt, Exequías Inostroza, Alexis Marín	Comedy, Mockumentary	Nominated – Best Film at the 31st Valdivia International Film Festival Winner – Special Jury Prize at the 31st Valdivia International Film Festival Winner – Audience Award at the 31st Valdivia International Film Festival Winner – Best Film at the 17th Chilean Film Festival Winner – Best Performance for Luisa Barrientos at the 17th Chilean Film Festival Nominated – International Competition for Best Film at the 26th Buenos Aires International Festival of Independent Cinema Winner – Best Director at the 26th Buenos Aires International Festival of Independent Cinema It had its commercial premiere on April 24, 2025, in Chilean theaters
The Dog Thief	El ladrón de perros	Vinko Tomičić	Franklin Aro, Alfredo Castro, María Luque, Julio César Altamirano, Ninon Davalos, Teresa Ruiz, Kleber Aro Huasco, Vladimir Gonza Mamani, Jhoselyn Rosmery Cosme, Wolframio Sinué, Felix Francisco Omonte Vargas, Iván Cori Mamani, Raúl Montecinos Heredia	Drama	Nominated – Best International Narrative Feature at the 23rd Tribeca Film Festival Nominated – Best Ibero-American Fiction Feature Film at the Winner – New Actor – Special Mention for Franklin Aro at the 39th Guadalajara International Film Festival Nominated – CineVision Award at the 41st Filmfest München Nominated – Best Picture at the 28th Lima Film Festival Winner – Special Jury Prize at the 28th Lima Film Festival Nominated – Best Film in the International Competition at the 20th Santiago International Film Festival Nominated – Best Performance for Franklin Aro in the International Competition at the 20th Santiago International Film Festival Nominated – Best International Feature Film at the 61st Antalya Golden Orange Film Festival Winner – Best Director in the International Competition & Best Actor for Franklin Aro at the 61st Antalya Golden Orange Film Festival Nominated – Latin-American Competition – Best Film at the 39th Mar del Plata International Film Festival Nominated – Best Fiction Feature Film at the 45th Havana Film Festival Winner – Best Screenplay at the 45th Havana Film Festival Nominated – Best Latin-American Film at the 30th Forqué Awards Winner – Best Latin-American Film at the 28th Málaga Film Festival Nominated – MARIMBAS Award at the Miami Film Festival Winner – Best Ibero-American Debut Film at the 12th Platino Awards Nominated – Film and Values Education at the 12th Platino Awards Nominated – Best Ibero-American Film at the 67th Ariel Awards An international co-production with Bolivia, Ecuador, Mexico, France and Italy Premiered on August 29
Henri: The Last Pirate	Henri, el último pirata	Julián Fernández Prieto		Documentary	It had its commercial premiere on 20 March 2025
In Her Place	El lugar de la otra	Maite Alberdi	Elisa Zulueta, Francisca Lewin, Marcial Tagle, Pablo Macaya, Gabriel Urzúa	Crime, Historical drama	
Isla Negra		Jorge Riquelme Serrano	Alfredo Castro, Paulina Urrutia, Gastón Salgado, Marcela Salinas, José Soza	Social thriller	Winner – Audience Award FOCUS SUD at the 25th FILMAR Festival in Latin America It had its commercial premiere on 17 April 2025 in Chilean theaters
Just One Spring	Una sola primavera	Joaquín Pedretti	Majo Cabrera, Salma Vera, Ever Enciso, Miguel Romero, Mauricio Paniagua, Sonia Tiranti	Drama	An international co-production with Argentina and Paraguay
Malas costumbres		Pablo Mantilla	Rodrigo Pardow, Mariana Loyola, Rodrigo Lisboa, Mayte Rodríguez, Joseff Messmer, Jaime Azócar, Sebastián Arrigorriaga, Jaime McManus	Comedy	Premiered on March 14
Maybe It's True What They Say About Us	Quizás es cierto lo que dicen de nosotras	Camilo Becerra & Sofía Paloma Gómez	Aline Kuppenheim, Camila Milenka, Julia Lübbert, Alessandra Guerzoni, María Paz Collarte	Thriller, Drama	Premiered on May 30 Worldwide released on April 7 on Amazon Prime Video Nominated – Horizontes Latinos Award at the 72nd San Sebastián International Film Festival Nominated – Best International Film at the 48th Gothenburg Film Festival An international co-production with Argentina and Spain
Oasis		Felipe Morgado & Tamara Uribe		Documentary	Nominated – Berlinale Documentary Film Award at the 74th Berlin International Film Festival Nominated – Best International Documentary Feature Film at the 27th Guanajuato International Film Festival Winner – Special Jury Mention at the 27th Guanajuato International Film Festival Winner – Best Documentary at the 31st Biarritz Latin American Festival Premiered on November 7
Perfectly a Strangeness		Alison McAlpine		Short documentary	Chile-Canada coproduction
The Silence of Marcos Tremmer	El silencio de Marcos Tremmer	Miguel García de la Calera	Benjamín Vicuña, Adriana Ugarte, Félix Gómez, Daniel Hendler, Enrique Villén, Hony Estrella, Mirta Busnelli, Irene Ferreiro, Rodo Castañares, Julián Valcárcel, Walter Rey, Andrés López Sierra	Romantic drama	Nominated – Latin-American Competition for Best Film at the 39th Mar del Plata International Film Festival An international co-production with Spain, the Dominican Republic and Uruguay It was commercially released on January 16, 2025, in Chilean theaters
The True Story Of People In The Dragon	Los People in the Dragon	Pablo Greene	Catalina Saavedra, José Antonio Raffo, Abel Zicavo, Jose Nast, Mario Ocampo, Anita Reeves, Camilo Zicavo, Juan Anania, Felipe Rojas, Claudio Arredondo, Colomba Feite, Francisco Pérez-Bannen, Dani Pino		Nominated – Best Film in the National Feature Competition at the 36th Viña del Mar International Film Festival Winner – Special Mention at the 36th Viña del Mar International Film Festival It is scheduled for commercial release on 5 June 2025
When Clouds Hide the Shadow	Cuando las nubes esconden la sombra	José Luis Torres Leiva	María Alché	Docudrama	Nominated – Horizontes Latinos Award at the 72nd San Sebastián International Film Festival Winner – Jury Prize at the 3rd Latin American Film Festival in Paris An international co-production with Argentina and South Korea
The Wild Years	Los años salvajes	Andrés Nazarala	Daniel Antivilo, Alejandro Goic, José Soza, Nathalia Galgani, Daniel Muñoz	Comedy-drama	Nominated – Best Film at the 31st Valdivia International Film Festival Nominated – Best Film at the 6th Ñuble National Film Festival Winner – Special Mention for Outstanding Leading Performance for Daniel Antivilo at the 6th Ñuble National Film Festival It had its commercial premiere on 10 April 2025
A Yard of Jackals	Patio de chacales	Diego Figueroa	Néstor Cantillana, Blanca Lewin, María Jesús Marcone, Rodrigo Pérez, Juan Cano, Consuelo Holzapfel, Grimanesa Jiménez, Pablo Schwarz	Psychological thriller	Nominated – Best First Feature Film at the 28th Tallinn Black Nights Film Festival Winner – Best First Feature Director at the 28th Tallinn Black Nights Film Festival Winner – Best Film in the Latin American Fiction Competition at the 36th Viña del Mar International Film Festival Winner – Audience Award at the 6th Ñuble National Film Festival Nominated – Best Film at the 27th Punta del Este International Film Festival It had its commercial premiere on 23 January 2025
Zafari		Mariana Rondón	Daniela Ramírez, Francisco Denis, Samantha Castillo, Varek La Rosa, Alí Rondón, Beto Benites, Claret Quea, Juan Carlos Colombo	Black comedy, Drama, Dystopia	Nominated – Horizontes Latinos Award at the 72nd San Sebastián International Film Festival Winner – FBAL Award for Feature Film from the French Union of Film Critics at the 33rd Biarritz Film Festival Nominated – Best International Film at the 29th International Film Festival of Kerala Nominated – Grand Prix at the 39th Fribourg International Film Festival Nominated – CineRebels Award at the 42nd Munich International Film Festival Nominated – Trophy Spondylus at the 29th Lima Film Festival Nominated – Chilean Film Competition for Best Film at the 21st Santiago International Film Festival An international co-production with Venezuela, Peru, Mexico, France, Chile, the Dominican Republic and Brazil It was commercially released on September 4, 2025, in Chilean theaters
Delirio		Alexandra Latishev Salazar			Chile-Costa Rica co-production
Maria		Pablo Larraín	Angelina Jolie		International co-production
Simon of the Mountain	Simón de la montaña	Federico Luis	Lorenzo Ferro		Argentina-Chile-Uruguay co-production
The Exiles	Los Tortuga	Belén Funes	Antonia Zegers, Elvira Lara		Chile-Spain co-production
The Hyperboreans	Los hiperbóreos	Cristobal León & Joaquín Cociña			Premiered at the 77th Cannes Film Festival
The Mother and the Bear		Johnny Ma			Canada-Chile co-production
Through Rocks and Clouds	Raíz	Franco García Becerra		Drama	Chile-Peru co-production
2025
About Astronauts and Ghosts	De astronautas y fantasmas	Luis R. Vera	Héctor Silva, Tomás Arredondo, Sofía Netto Barrios, Raquel Baeza	Drama	Nominated - Best Film at the 40th Ibero-Latin American Film Festival of Trieste Winner - Special Jury Prize at the 40th Ibero-Latin American Film Festival of Trieste Premiered on December 11 Paraguay-Chile co-production
The Blue Trail	O Último Azul	Gabriel Mascaro	Denise Weinberg, Rodrigo Santoro	Fantasy, Sci-fi	It will have its world premiere in February 2025, as part of the 75th Berlin International Film Festival, in Competition.
Mutant	La mutante	Constanza Tejo	Constanza Tejo, Soledad Roa Allende, Coco Allende Santibáñez, Romina Tejo Roa, Catalina Tejo Roa, Rodolfo Tejo Merino, Claudio Aránguiz Sepúlveda, Teo Aránguiz Tejo, Shenda Román, Luz Croxatto, Yashira Zomosa, Paula Ureta	Documentary	Premiered on January 9 Winner – Premio della Critica SNCCI at the 18th Pordenone Docs Fest Winner – Young Audience Award at the 18th Pordenone Docs Fest
Olivia and the Invisible Earthquake	L'Olívia i el terratrèmol invisible	Irene Iborra Rizo			International co-production
The Mysterious Gaze of the Flamingo	La misteriosa mirada del flamenco	Diego Céspedes		Drama	International co-production
The Wave	La ola	Sebastián Lelio			Chile-United States co-production

== See also ==
- List of Chilean actors
