= List of Chilean submissions for the Academy Award for Best International Feature Film =

Best International Feature Film submissions from Chile

Highlights
- Debut: 1990
- Submissions: 31
- Nominations: 2
- Oscar winners: 1

Chile has submitted films for the Academy Award for Best International Feature Film (Note: The category was previously named the Academy Award for Best Foreign Language Film, but this was changed to the Academy Award for Best International Feature Film in April 2019, after the Academy deemed the word "Foreign" to be outdated.) since 1990. The award is handed out annually by the United States Academy of Motion Picture Arts and Sciences to a feature-length motion picture produced outside the United States that contains primarily non-English dialogue. The Academy of Motion Picture Arts and Sciences has invited the film industries of various countries to submit their best film for the Academy Award for Best Foreign Language Film since 1956. The Foreign Language Film Award Committee oversees the process and reviews all the submitted films. Following this, they vote via secret ballot to determine the five nominees for the award.

As of 2025, Chile has been nominated twice, winning once for A Fantastic Woman (2017).

== Submissions ==
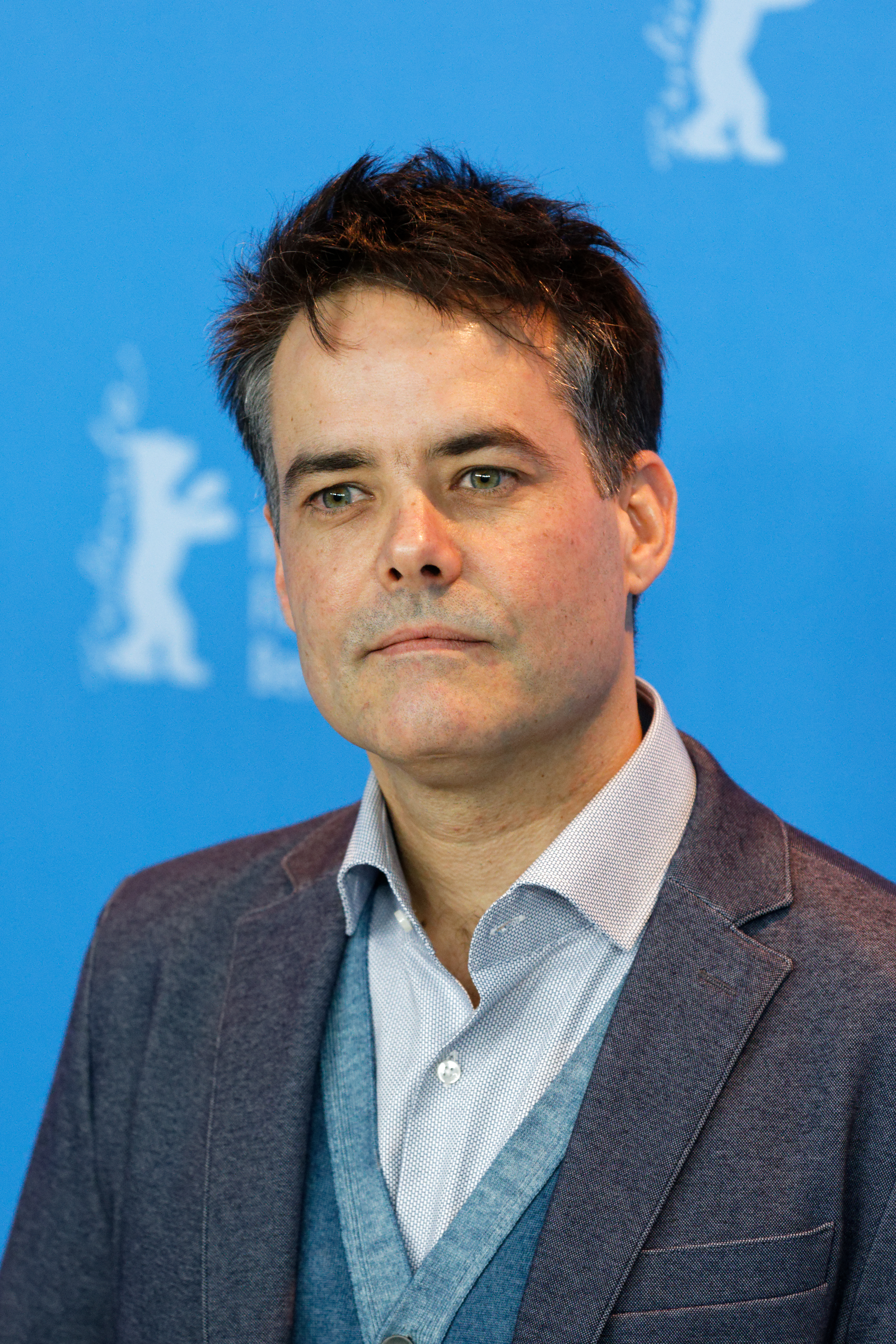
Sebastián Lelio was the first Chilean filmmaker to win the award, for A Fantastic Woman

The Chilean submission is selected annually by the Consejo del Arte y la Industria Audiovisual, which chooses a nominee for the Spanish Goya Awards at the same time. The Goya nominee is usually the same film as the Oscar nominee (1991, 1993, 2001, 2003, 2004, 2006, 2007, 2009) but not always (1990, 2005, 2008, 2012).

The 2009 race was particularly controversial, when The Maid, directed by Sebastián Silva and one of the most awarded films in Chile's cinematic history, was passed over in favor of a historical drama Dawson Isla 10 by Miguel Littin. The Chilean Cultural Council released a statement in November 2009, defending the decision.

Pablo Larraín is the most selected filmmaker, with four films submitted, including one nomination for No (2012), which was also the country's first nomination in the category. Although the snub of Ema (2019) and El Conde (2023) were met with controversy. The latter was nominated for the Academy Award for Best Cinematography.

The documentary The Mole Agent (2020) directed by Maite Alberdi, advanced to the December shortlisted semifinalists, but was not nominated, although ended up being nominated for Best Documentary Feature. The film also marked the first production directed by a woman to be submitted for the category.

All the films are primary in Spanish. Below is a list of the films that have been submitted by Chile for review by the academy for the award by year and the respective Academy Awards ceremony. All films selected are primary spoken in Spanish.

Year (Ceremony)	Film title used in nomination	Original title	Language(s)	Director(s)	Result
1990 (63rd)	The Moon in the Mirror	La luna en el espejo	Spanish	Silvio Caiozzi	Not nominated
1991 (64th)	The Frontier	La frontera	Spanish	Ricardo Larraín	Not nominated
1993 (66th)	Johnny 100 Pesos		Spanish	Gustavo Graef Marino	Not nominated
1994 (67th)	Amnesia		Spanish	Gonzalo Justiniano	Not nominated
2000 (73rd)	Coronation	Coronación	Spanish	Silvio Caiozzi	Not nominated
2001 (74th)	A Cab for Three	Taxi para tres	Spanish	Orlando Lubbert	Not nominated
2002 (75th)	Ogu and Mampato in Rapa Nui	Ogú y Mampato en Rapa Nui	Spanish	Alejandro Rojas	Not nominated
2003 (76th)	Los Debutantes		Spanish	Andrés Waissbluth	Not nominated
2004 (77th)	Machuca		Spanish	Andrés Wood	Not nominated
2005 (78th)	Play		Spanish	Alicia Scherson	Not nominated
2006 (79th)	In Bed	En la cama	Spanish	Matías Bize	Not nominated
2007 (80th)	Padre Nuestro		Spanish, English	Rodrigo Sepúlveda	Not nominated
2008 (81st)	Tony Manero		Spanish	Pablo Larraín	Not nominated
2009 (82nd)	Dawson, Island 10	Dawson, Isla 10	Spanish	Miguel Littín	Not nominated
2010 (83rd)	The Life of Fish	La vida de los peces	Spanish	Matías Bize	Not nominated
2011 (84th)	Violeta Went to Heaven	Violeta se fue a los cielos	Spanish	Andrés Wood	Not nominated
2012 (85th)	No		Spanish, English	Pablo Larraín	Nominated
2013 (86th)	Gloria		Spanish	Sebastián Lelio	Not nominated
2014 (87th)	To Kill a Man	Matar a un hombre	Spanish	Alejandro Fernández Almendras	Not nominated
2015 (88th)	The Club	El Club	Spanish	Pablo Larraín	Not nominated
2016 (89th)	Neruda		Spanish	Pablo Larraín	Not nominated
2017 (90th)	A Fantastic Woman	Una mujer fantástica	Spanish	Sebastián Lelio	Won Academy Award
2018 (91st)	And Suddenly the Dawn	...Y de pronto el amanecer	Spanish	Silvio Caiozzi	Not nominated
2019 (92nd)	Spider	Araña	Spanish, German, Haitian Creole	Andrés Wood	Not nominated
2020 (93rd)	The Mole Agent	El agente topo	Spanish	Maite Alberdi	Made shortlist
2021 (94th)	White on White	Blanco en blanco	Spanish, English	Théo Court	Not nominated
2022 (95th)	Blanquita		Spanish	Fernando Guzzoni	Not nominated
2023 (96th)	The Settlers	Los colonos	Spanish, English	Felipe Gálvez Haberle	Not nominated
2024 (97th)	In Her Place	El lugar de la otra	Spanish	Maite Alberdi	Not nominated
2025 (98th)	The Mysterious Gaze of the Flamingo	La misteriosa mirada del flamenco	Spanish	Diego Céspedes	Not nominated
2026 (99th)	The Meltdown	El deshielo	Spanish, German, English	Manuela Martelli	Pending

== Shortlisted films ==
Since 2000, Chile has announced a list of finalists or eligible films that varied in number over the years (from 2 to 14 films) before announcing their official Oscar nominee, except in the years 2002, 2006, 2013–2015 and 2018 where an official list was not announced. The following films have been shortlisted by the Audiovisual Art and Industry Council, a collegiate committee of audiovisual specialists brought together by the CNCA between 2003 and 2019, and by the Chilean Film Academy from 2020:

Year	Films
2000	Somewhere in the Night · Tierra del Fuego
2001	Loco Fever
2003	Cesante · Eternal Blood · Sex with Love
2004	Azul y blanco · B-Happy · Bad Blood · The Chosen One · Underground · XS: The Worst Size
2005	Decent People · Juego de verano · My Best Enemy · Time Off · Unfaithful Women
2007	Casa de remolienda · Fiestapatria · The King of San Gregorio · Scrambled Beer · Ugly Me
2008	31 minutos, la película · 199 Tips to Be Happy · The Good Life · Life Kills Me · Mansacue · Microfilia · Mirageman · South Desert · The Toast
2009	Christmas · El regalo · The Maid · Muñeca
2010	Huacho · Optical Illusions · Tendida mirando las estrellas · Tourists
2011	Post mortem · Ulysses
2012	Bonsái · Old Cats · Sal
2016	Chicago Boys · The Inca Prince · Inside the Mind of a Psychopath · The Pearl Button · No Filter · Sex Life of Plants · Talion
2017	Damn Kids
2019	Dry Martina · Ema · The Man of the Future · Too Late to Die Young
2020	Jailbreak Pact · Kill Pinochet · Lina from Lima · My Tender Matador
2021	Bad Neighbor · The Eternal Moment · Fever Dream · Forgotten Roads · The Journey of Monalisa · My Brothers Dream Awake · The Promise of Return · Superno · Take a Spin in the Air · Three Souls · La Verónica
2022	130 Children · 1976 · Burning Patience · The Cow Who Sang a Song Into the Future · Gaucho Americano · Immersion · (Im)Patient · Karnawal · My Imaginary Country · A Place Called Dignity · La Provisoria · The Punishment · Songs of Repression
2023	El Conde · The Eternal Memory · Meeting Point · El vacío
2024	Analogues · History and Geography · Malas costumbres · Maybe It's True What They Say About Us · Prison in the Andes
2025	Bitter Gold · Designation of Origin · The Hyperboreans · The Wave · A Yard of Jackals
2026	Beyond the Mist · The Chilean · Cuerpo Celeste · Left Unsaid · Matapanki · La Perra · The Red Hangar · Summer War · A Thousand Pieses · Unwelcomed

== Statistics ==
Number of submissions	Name	Films
4	Pablo Larraín	Tony Manero · No · The Club · Neruda
3	Silvio Caiozzi	The Moon in the Mirror · Coronation · And Suddenly the Dawn
3	Andrés Wood	Machuca · Violeta Went to Heaven · Spider
2	Maite Alberdi	The Mole Agent · In Her Place
2	Matías Bize	In Bed · The Life of Fish
2	Sebastián Lelio	Gloria · A Fantastic Woman

== See also ==
- List of Chilean Academy Award winners and nominees
- List of Academy Award winners and nominees for Best International Feature Film
- List of Academy Award-winning foreign language films
