= List of 2008 box office number-one films in Chile =

This is a list of films which have placed number one at the weekend box office in Chile during 2008.

== Films ==
†	This implies the highest-grossing movie of the year.

#	Date	Film	Gross	Notes
1	January 6, 2008	National Treasure: Book of Secrets	$123,862	
2	January 13, 2008	Enchanted	$107,061	
3	January 20, 2008	I Am Legend	$312,762	
4	January 27, 2008	I Am Legend	$154,075	
5	February 3, 2008	I Am Legend	$115,174	
6	February 10, 2008	Cloverfield	$95,123	
7	February 17, 2008	The Water Horse: Legend of the Deep	$93,698	
8	February 24, 2008	The Water Horse: Legend of the Deep	$70,187	
9	March 2, 2008	American Gangster	$80,601	
10	March 9, 2008	10,000 BC	$309,515	
11	March 16, 2008	10,000 BC	$224,902	
12	March 23, 2008	10,000 BC	$156,789	
13	March 30, 2008	31 minutos †	$286,427	
14	April 6, 2008	31 minutos †	$220,985	
15	April 13, 2008	31 minutos †	$121,552	
16	April 20, 2008	31 minutos †	$106,283	
17	April 27, 2008	31 minutos †	$72,801	
18	May 4, 2008	Iron Man	$527,314	
19	May 11, 2008	Iron Man	$185,4051	
20	May 18, 2008	The Chronicles of Narnia: Prince Caspian	$539,888	
21	May 25, 2008	Indiana Jones and the Kingdom of the Crystal Skull	$483,914	
22	June 1, 2008	Indiana Jones and the Kingdom of the Crystal Skull	$296,499	
23	June 8, 2008	The Chronicles of Narnia: Prince Caspian	$209,544	
24	June 15, 2008	The Happening	$223,054	
25	June 22, 2008	Get Smart	$192,453	
26	June 29, 2008	Wall-E	$545,035	
27	July 6, 2008	Wall-E	$435,033	
28	July 13, 2008	Kung Fu Panda	$508,559	
29	July 20, 2008	The Dark Knight	$805,318	
30	July 27, 2008	The Dark Knight	$604,025	
31	August 3, 2008	The Mummy: Tomb of the Dragon Emperor	$443,260	
32	August 10, 2008	Journey to the Center of the Earth	$319,620	
33	August 17, 2008	Journey to the Center of the Earth	$305,775	
34	August 24, 2008	Journey to the Center of the Earth	$151,955	
35	August 31, 2008	Journey to the Center of the Earth	$149,051	
36	September 7, 2008	Journey to the Center of the Earth	$114,406	
37	September 14, 2008	You Don't Mess with the Zohan	$114,298	
38	September 21, 2008	Journey to the Center of the Earth	$89,661	
39	September 28, 2008	Journey to the Center of the Earth	$81,495	
40	October 5, 2008	Mirrors	$83,802	
41	October 12, 2008	Mirrors	$64,361	
42	October 19, 2008	Mamma Mia!	$92,675	
43	October 26, 2008	Mamma Mia!	$47,239	
44	November 2, 2008	Mamma Mia!	$63,630	
45	November 9, 2008	Quantum of Solace	$259,998	
46	November 16, 2008	Quantum of Solace	$154,842	
47	November 23, 2008	High School Musical 3: Senior Year	$226,153	High School Musical 3: Senior Year is the highest weekend opening for a musical film.
48	November 30, 2008	High School Musical 3: Senior Year	$115,978	
49	December 7, 2008	Madagascar: Escape 2 Africa	$402,766	
50	December 14, 2008	The Day the Earth Stood Still	$243,095	
51	December 21, 2008	Madagascar: Escape 2 Africa	$178,780	
52	December 28, 2008	Bolt	$269,313	

== See also ==
- List of Chilean films
