= List of 2009 box office number-one films in Chile =

This is a list of films which have placed number one at the weekend box office in Chile during 2009.

== Films ==
†	This implies the highest-grossing movie of the year.

#	Date	Film	Gross	Notes
1	January 4, 2009	Twilight	$287,433	
2	January 11, 2009	Twilight	$153,007	
3	January 18, 2009	Yes Man	$167,997	
4	January 25, 2009	The Curious Case of Benjamin Button	$155,449	
5	February 1, 2009	The Curious Case of Benjamin Button	$136,475	
6	February 8, 2009	The Curious Case of Benjamin Button	$105,565	
7	February 15, 2009	Valkyrie	$200,414	
8	February 22, 2009	Bedtime Stories	$182,093	
9	March 1, 2009	Bedtime Stories	$187,984	
10	March 8, 2009	Bedtime Stories	$104,267	
11	March 15, 2009	Bedtime Stories	$82,986	
12	March 22, 2009	Underworld: Rise of the Lycans	$75,006	
13	March 29, 2009	Bedtime Stories	$53,213	
14	April 5, 2009	Monsters vs. Aliens	$287,516	
15	April 12, 2009	Monsters vs. Aliens	$201,337	
16	April 19, 2009	Race to Witch Mountain	$124,997	
17	April 26, 2009	Race to Witch Mountain	$101,432	
18	May 3, 2009	X-Men Origins: Wolverine	$388,721	
19	May 10, 2009	X-Men Origins: Wolverine	$162,230	
20	May 17, 2009	Angels & Demons	$601,689	
21	May 24, 2009	Angels & Demons	$500,108	
22	May 31, 2009	Night at the Museum: Battle of the Smithsonian	$282,581	
23	June 7, 2009	Terminator Salvation: The Future Begins	$355,924	
24	June 14, 2009	Up	$688,885	
25	June 21, 2009	Up	$554,330	
26	June 28, 2009	Transformers: Revenge of the Fallen	$566,091	
27	July 5, 2009	Ice Age: Dawn of the Dinosaurs	$1,381,331	Ice Age: Dawn of the Dinosaurs is the highest weekend opening since The Simpsons Movie, and It's the most viewed film in the country since Titanic with a total gross of $7 mil.
28	July 12, 2009	Ice Age: Dawn of the Dinosaurs	$1,139,680	
29	July 19, 2009	Harry Potter and the Half Blood Prince	$1,218,763	
30	July 26, 2009	Up	$1,710,885	Up with $1.7 mil gross broke Ice Age: Dawn of the Dinosaurs's record ($1.4 mil) and it is the highest gross for a week and $5 mil gross to date.
31	August 2, 2009	Ice Age: Dawn of the Dinosaurs	$286,526	
32	August 9, 2009	G-Force	$240,471	
33	August 16, 2009	G-Force	$144,199	
34	August 23, 2009	G-Force	$97,054	
35	August 30, 2009	Orphan	$103,593	
36	September 6, 2009	Orphan	$92,758	
37	September 13, 2009	The Taking of Pelham 123	$83,565	
38	September 20, 2009	The Taking of Pelham 123	$61,957	
39	September 27, 2009	Cloudy with a Chance of Meatballs	$164,873	
40	October 4, 2009	The Final Destination	$165,958	
41	October 11, 2009	The Final Destination	$119,688	
42	October 18, 2009	Inglourious Basterds	$123,111	
43	October 25, 2009	Inglourious Basterds	$100,612	
44	November 1, 2009	Michael Jackson's This Is It	$238,978	
45	November 8, 2009	A Christmas Carol	$187,756	
46	November 15, 2009	2012	$973,326	
47	November 22, 2009	2012	$778,394	
48	November 29, 2009	The Twilight Saga: New Moon	$773,310	
49	December 6, 2009	The Twilight Saga: New Moon	$365,545	
50	December 13, 2009	The Twilight Saga: New Moon	$122,221	
51	December 20, 2009	Avatar †	$1,085,054	
52	December 27, 2009	Avatar †	$975,811	

== See also ==
- List of Chilean films
