= You Think You're the Prettiest, But You Are the Sluttiest =

- Theatrical release poster
- Directed by: Che Sandoval
- Written by: Che Sandoval
- Produced by: Karla Kri
- Starring: Martin Castillo
- Cinematography: Felipe Bello
- Edited by: Che Sandoval; Manuela Piña
- Music by: Adan Jodorowsky; Emilio Bascuñán
- Production companies: Escuela de Cine de Chile; Punk On Palta Producciones
- Release dates: October 2009 (FICV); April 29, 2010 (Chile)
- Running time: 89 minutes
- Country: Chile
- Language: Spanish

You Think You're the Prettiest, But You Are the Sluttiest (Spanish: Te creís la más linda (pero erís la más puta)) is a 2009 Chilean comedy film written and directed by Che Sandoval in his directorial debut. It stars Martin Castillo. It is about the adventures of a music student who, after a failed sexual encounter, wanders through Bellavista meeting unique characters.

== Synopsis ==
Javier, after his failure in bed with Valentina, wanders the streets of Santiago looking for sexual adventures. In the course of a long night, he meets a series of characters and confesses his torments to them. He suspects that Valentina is sleeping with his best friend, but he will have to wait until the next day to prove it.

== Cast ==
The actors participating in this film are:

- Martin Castillo as Javier
- Camila Le-Bert as Valentina
- Francisco Braithwaite as Nicolás
- Andrea Riquelme as Francisca
- Grimanesa Jiménez as The Slut
- Eduardo Cruz as Benjamín
- Paula Bravo as Tania
- Che Sandoval as Valentina's Ex-Boyfriend
- Sebastián Brahm as El Naza / Cristobal
- Bárbara Rebolledo as Tania's friend

== Release ==
You Think You're the Prettiest, But You Are the Sluttiest had its world premiere in mid-October 2009 at the 16th Valdivia International Film Festival. It was commercially released on April 29, 2010, in Chilean theaters.

== Accolades ==
Year	Award / Festival	Category	Recipient	Result	Ref.
2009	B-Cinema Film Festival	Best Director	Che Sandoval	Won	
2009	B-Cinema Film Festival	Best Screenplay - Special Mention	Che Sandoval	Won	
2010	La Plata Latin American Film Festival	Best Fiction Feature Film	You Think You're the Prettiest, But You Are the Sluttiest	Won	
2011	Altazor Awards	Best Fiction Film Direction	Che Sandoval	Nominated	
2011	Altazor Awards	Best Screenplay	Che Sandoval	Nominated	
2011	Pedro Sienna Awards	Best Director	Che Sandoval	Nominated	
2011	Pedro Sienna Awards	Best Actor	Martín Castillo	Won	
2011	Pedro Sienna Awards	Best Supporting Actress	Grimanesa Jiménez	Nominated	
2011	Pedro Sienna Awards	Best Supporting Actor	Mauricio Braitwaite	Won	
2011	Pedro Sienna Awards	Best Editing	Manuela Piña	Nominated	
