= The Most Beautiful of My Very Best Years =

- Lo más bonito y mis mejores años
- Directed by: Martín Boulocq
- Written by: Martín Boulocq
- Produced by: Ara Katz; Sam Englebardt; Kevin Ragsdale; Alba Balderrama
- Starring: Juan Pablo Milán; Roberto Guilhon; Alejandra Lanza
- Music by: Diego Boulocq, Rich Ragsdale
- Release date: 2005
- Running time: 96 minutes
- Country: Bolivia
- Language: Spanish

The Most Beautiful of My Very Best Years (Spanish: Lo más bonito y mis mejores años) is a 2005 Bolivian drama film directed by Martín Boulocq. A fable of urban life in the city of Cochabamba, it stars Juan Pablo Milán, Roberto Guilhon and Alejandra Lanza. Since its release the film has won several festival awards and been the subject of retrospectives and film-festival programs.

== Synopsis ==
Berto (Milán) is a young man from Cochabamba trying to sell a car he inherited from his grandfather so that he can leave the country. He drives around the city with his friend Víctor (Guilhon) looking for buyers. Their easy routine is disrupted by the arrival of Camila (Lanza), Víctor's girlfriend, who returns to the country after living in exile abroad and brings tension to the two friends' relationship.

== Production ==
The film was made unconventionally. In interviews, Boulocq said the process involved roughly six months of rehearsals, with principal photography carried out over about three months. There was no conventional screenplay; instead the director worked from a notebook of annotations, developing the film gradually as he rehearsed. During rehearsals Boulocq encouraged the actors to improvise in order to achieve a natural "credibility" in their characters. He likened the process to that of a writer — "you write, revise and rewrite again" — and noted that, of all the material he shot, only a few minutes made the final cut.

== Awards ==
Festival	Year	Category	Result
Guadalajara International Film Festival	2006	Best First Film	Winner
Trieste Latin American Film Festival	2006	Best First Film	Winner
Valdivia International Film Festival	2006	Critics' Prize	Winner
