= About Astronauts and Ghosts =

- Theatrical release poster
- Spanish: De astronautas y fantasmas
- Directed by: Luis R. Vera
- Written by: Luis R. Vera
- Produced by: Luis R. Vera
- Starring: Héctor Silva; Tomás Arredondo; Sofía Netto Barrios
- Cinematography: Alfredo García
- Edited by: Luis R. Vera; Noelia Armele Banks
- Music by: Alcides Ovelar; Klarika Kusk
- Production company: Luis R. Vera Cine
- Release dates: November 15, 2025 (Trieste); December 11, 2025 (Chile)
- Running time: 97 minutes
- Countries: Paraguay; Chile
- Language: Spanish

About Astronauts and Ghosts (Spanish: De astronautas y fantasmas) is a 2025 magical realism romantic drama film written, produced, co-edited and directed by Luis R. Vera. A joint Paraguayan-Chilean co-production, starring Héctor Silva, Tomás Arredondo and Sofía Netto Barrios, who makes her acting debut.

== Synopsis ==
Pedro, a grandfather with a terminal illness, and his granddaughter María face family conflicts alongside José, a delivery worker, in an intimate story that reflects a country’s past and present.

== Cast ==
- Héctor Silva as Pedro
- Tomás Arredondo as José
- Sofía Netto Barrios as María
- Raquel Baeza

== Production ==
Principal photography lasted 18 days in a single location, ending in late August 2024 in Asunción, Paraguay.

== Release ==
The film premiered worldwide on November 15, 2025, at the 40th Ibero-Latin American Film Festival of Trieste, and on November 29 at the 37th Viña del Mar International Film Festival. It was released commercially on December 11, 2025, in Chilean independent theaters.

== Accolades ==
Award / Festival	Date of ceremony	Category	Recipient(s)	Result	Ref.
Ibero-Latin American Film Festival of Trieste	17 November 2025	Best Film	About Astronauts and Ghosts	Nominated	
Ibero-Latin American Film Festival of Trieste	17 November 2025	Special Jury Prize	About Astronauts and Ghosts	Won	
