= Marcela Osorio =

Chilean film and television actress (born 1964)

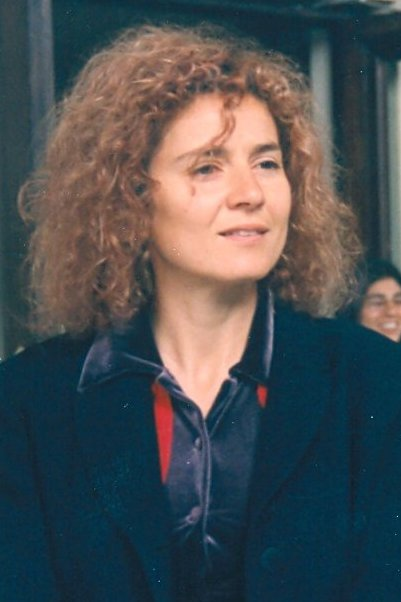
- Osorio in 1999
- Born: Marcela Osorio Méndez; May 11, 1964 (age 61); Valparaíso, Chile
- Occupation: Actress,
- Years active: 1981–present

Marcela Osorio Méndez (born May 11, 1964, in Valparaíso, Chile) is a Chilean film and television actress.

== Biography and career ==
Marcela Osorio was born in the city of Valparaíso, in the homonymous province, Chile. At age 12, for political reasons, her family moved to Barcelona, Spain. Four years later she would move to live alone in Italy.

In Italy, without acting studies, she made her debut in theater at the age of 17, achieving some brief participations, until in 1983 the writer Antonio Skármeta invited her to participate in the making of his film Burning Patience based on the novel Ardiente paciencia, in the leading role of Beatriz González, the young and naive girl seduced by a postman, who, by plagiarizing Pablo Neruda's verses, manages to win his love. In this film, Marcela shows the sensuality that will characterize her career. The 1994's remake is better known internationally, entitled Il Postino: The Postman.

In 1986, she decided to return to Chile, where she obtained the main role in the film Sussi, directed by Gonzalo Justiniano, released in 1987. Sussi is a provincial girl who arrived in Santiago, looking for a job, but on each occasion men seek to take advantage of her, however, a roommate, played by Bastián Bodenhöfer, conquers her with his mysteries and games. Sussi finally becomes a symbol of a government campaign, a stereotype of Chilean women, in the middle of a tour she discovers that she is pregnant and is forced to abort, in the delirium of fever, hallucinates that her lover comes to rescue her.

After Sussi premiered, Marcela Osorio debuted in television role in the telenovela La Villa and Mi nombre es Lara on TVN, in the role of Lupita, broadcast in 1987. She also acts in Felipe Vilches's film El País de Octubre (1990). In 1991, she again in the leading role, she acts in La Niña en la palomera, directed by Alfredo Rates, based on the book by Fernando Cuadra, who participated in the script.

In 1993, she returned to the cinema in a Spanish-Chilean co-production, Ciénaga. The story moves to the south of Chile, a place full of mysticism and beautiful places. Marcela Osorio stars as a young woman married to a forgotten Mexican actor, whose golden age had been the ranchero music cinema of the 1950s. The film was directed by José Ángel Bohollo, who was nominated for a Goya Award for Best New Director.

In 1994, she returns to work with Gonzalo Justiniano, in Amnesia, in the role of Marta, a political prisoner held in a concentration camp in the desert north of Chile. The film received several awards at international festivals and an excellent review.

In addition to her film career, Marcela Osorio has participated in many television productions such as some episodes of El Cuento del Tío and Los Venegas on TVN, and in Infieles, a Chilevisión medium-length film. She also participated as a jury in the Chilevisión program "Cuánto vale el show" in the 1994 season; in the program Siempre contigo (2003-2004) and in the cycle Viva el teatro (2005) both of Mega. In the 1990s she joined the Channel 13's drama area where she acted in many successful telenovelas such as Marrón Glacé, El amor está de moda, and Fuera de control. Her last telenovela was Volver a amar in 2014 in TVN.

In 2007, she returned to the big screen with the film Fiestapatria, which received excellent criticism and made her the winner of the Best Actress Award at the 9th Santa Cruz de la Sierra Ibero-American Film Festival (Bolivia, 2007), and in the 3rd edition of the Pedro Sienna Awards, she won the award for Best Female Leading Performance 2008.

In 2008, she participated in the film with a script by Raúl Ruiz, Secretos, under the direction of Valeria Sarmiento, Ruiz's wife. And the next year in El pasaporte amarillo, by Ruiz.

In recent years, Marcela Osorio has devoted herself to eastern medicine, without neglecting her acting activities, attending the Public Assistance Emergency Hospital (HUAP), formerly the Central Post Office. This activity began after her first daughter was born, and while she was pregnant with a second child.

== Filmography ==
=== Films ===
Film
Year	Title	Role	Director
1983	Burning Patience	Beatriz González	Antonio Skármeta
1987	Sussi	Sussi	Gonzalo Justiniano
1990	El país de octubre		Felipe Vilches
1991	La niña en la palomera	Anita	Alfredo Rates
1991	Ciénaga	Daniela	José Ángel Bohollo
1994	Amnesia	Marta	Gonzalo Justiniano
2007	Fiestapatria	Isabel	Luis R. Vera
2008	Secretos		Valeria Sarmiento
2009	El pasaporte amarillo		Raúl Ruiz

=== Telenovelas ===
Telenovela
Year	Telenovela	Role	Channel
1986	La Villa	Macarena Méndez	TVN
1987	Mi nombre es Lara	Guadalupe Menares	TVN
1992	Fácil de amar	Claudia Lillo	Canal 13
1993	Marrón Glacé	Selva Rojas	Canal 13
1994	Champaña	Julia Ponce	Canal 13
1995	El amor está de moda	Solange Viveros	Canal 13
1996	Marrón Glace, el regreso	Selva Rojas	Canal 13
1997	Eclipse de luna	Corín Casanueva	Canal 13
1998	Amándote	María Isabel Palacios	Canal 13
1999	Fuera de control	Tábata Villalobos	Canal 13
2000	Sabor a ti	Mabel Castro	Canal 13
2005	EsCool	Ruth Estévez	Mega
2007	Vivir con 10	Myriam Fernández	Chilevisión
2008	Mala conducta	Maripepa Inostroza / Mario Inostroza	Chilevisión
2009	Corazón rebelde	Mercedes Donoso	Canal 13
2014	Volver a amar	Betsabé Tapia	TVN

=== TV series ===
Serie
Year	Serie	Role	Channel
1994	Soltero a la medida	Ana "Anita" Pereira	Canal 13
1996	Vecinos puertas adentro	Patricia Cordero	Canal 13
2004	Geografía del deseo	María Pilar Villanueva	TVN
2004	Bienvenida realidad	Sol Maureira	TVN
2004	Los Venegas	Isolina Yáñez	TVN
2005	Infieles	Sandra (Capítulo: "La Nana")	Chilevisión
2020	El presidente	Neusa Marin, Luis Chiriboga's wife	Amazon Prime
