= Every Man for Himself (2021 film) =

Cada uno tiene su cada uno
- Film poster
- Directed by: Alexis Donoso
- Written by: Alexis Donoso
- Produced by: Florencia Dupont; Macarena Monrós
- Starring: Leonardo Pizarro; Nicolás Rojas; Romina Herrera
- Cinematography: Christhoper Contreras Ramos
- Edited by: Alexis Donoso
- Production companies: Cinema Girasol; Nítida Producciones
- Release date: October 2021 (Valdivia)
- Running time: 63 minutes
- Country: Chile
- Language: Spanish

Every Man for Himself (Spanish: Cada uno tiene su cada uno) is a 2021 Chilean drama film written and directed by Alexis Donoso in his directorial debut. Starring Leonardo Pizarro, Nicolás Rojas and Romina Herrera.

== Synopsis ==
Vicencio, an old country man who is half a punk and good at drinking, suffers cardiac arrest; his daughter and grandson, whom he has not seen for years, take care of him and take him to live in Rancagua. Vicencio, an invalid, does not get used to the apartment and his new routine, but the company of his grandson on vacation helps him cope with the moment; At least until school starts.

== Cast ==
- Leonardo Pizarro
- Nicolás Rojas
- Romina Herrera

== Release ==
Every Man for Himself had its national premiere in mid-October 2021 as part of the Official Selection of Feature Films of the 28th Valdivia International Film Festival. It also participated in the 5th Colchagua International Film Festival and the 13th Iquique International Film Festival in December 2021, both in Chile.
