= Notes for a Film =

Notas para una película
- International release poster
- Directed by: Ignacio Agüero
- Written by: Ignacio Agüero
- Produced by: Amalric de Poncharra; Viviana Erpel; Elisa Sepulveda Ruddoff; Tehani Staiger
- Cinematography: David Bravo
- Edited by: Claudio Aguilar; Ignacio Agüero; Jacques Comets
- Production companies: Ignacio Agüero & Asociado
- Release dates: October 2022 (FICV); 11 November 2022 (Mar del Plata); 25 May 2023 (Chile)
- Running time: 105 minutes
- Countries: Chile; France
- Languages: Spanish; French; Mapudungun

Notes For a Film (Spanish: Notas para una película) is a 2022 Chilean–French documentary film written and directed by Ignacio Agüero. Through the eyes of a young foreigner, Gustave Verniory, the film portrays the radical transformation of the recently pacified territory of Araucanía towards the end of the 19th century.

== Synopsis ==
A film which portrays the radical transformation of the territory of Araucanía at the end of the 19th through the eyes of a young foreigner, Gustave Verniory. The film draws a sensitive cinematic space, playing with and creating a dialogue between past and contemporary. It is a path that meanders between human and geographic landscapes, to reveal the deep essence of the Araucanía territory.

== Cast ==
- Gustave Verniory
- Alexis Maspreuve
- Ignacio Agüero

== Release ==
Notes For a Film had an initial premiere in mid-October 2022 at the 29th Valdivia International Film Festival. It had its international premiere on 11 November 2022 at the 37th Mar del Plata International Film Festival. It was commercially released on 25 May 2023 in Chilean theaters.

== Reception ==
Candelaria Carreño from Caligari Magazine wrote: "Notes For a Film seems to be a movie in progress, however, the resources it uses to account for the artifice are particularly measured. The description of the opening scene in which the guidelines of the story are set out give an account of this, and allow us to arrive at the tone that the film will maintain." Diego Batlle from Otros Cines wrote: "Notes For a Film is a documentary, but it is also fiction, a historical essay, a political denunciation and a game with all the tools of cinema... The result is a patchwork, a filmic puzzle with an austere and calm tone, without demagogy or sensationalism, but at the same time bold and provocative in its proposal, absolutely pertinent in these times because it hits the nail on the head by making visible its multiple edges (historical and contemporary) a conflict that also extends to Argentina regarding how to reconcile the needs of "progress" (read capitalism) with the ancestral rights of native peoples who have been deprived of their lands, which are in many cases sacred."
