= The Eternal Moment (film) =

- Promotional release poster
- Directed by: Sebastián Moreno
- Written by: Claudia Barril; Sebastián Moreno
- Produced by: Claudia Barril
- Cinematography: Maura Morales Bergmann; Sebastián Moreno
- Edited by: Sebastián Moreno
- Music by: Miguel Miranda
- Production company: Las Películas del Pez
- Distributed by: BF Distribution
- Release dates: June 4, 2021 (Online); July 5, 2022 (HBO MAX)
- Running time: 90 minutes
- Country: Chile
- Language: Spanish

The Eternal Moment (Spanish: Sergio Larrain: el instante eterno), also known as Sergio Larraín, The Eternal Moment, is a 2021 Chilean biographical documentary film directed by Sebastián Moreno and written by Moreno & Claudia Barril. It is about the life and work of Chilean photographer Sergio Larraín who worked with Magnum and retired at the height of his career to take refuge in the foothills town of Tulahuén.

== Synopsis ==
The life and work of photographer Sergio Larraín, considered the best in his country, will be explored, and we will get closer to the most mysterious aspects of his life.

== Release ==
The Eternal Moment premiered on digital platforms from June 4, 2021 to June 13 of the same year on the Creative Economy Platform. It premiered on July 5, 2022, on HBO MAX in Latin American territory.

== Reception ==
=== Critical reception ===
Enrique Morales Lastra of the newspaper Cine y Literatura highlights the investigative value of the documentary that becomes almost journalistic about the figure of Larraín, managing to be exciting and ending up being an excellent audiovisual radiography with great historical value.

=== Accolades ===
Year	Award / Festival	Category	Recipient	Result	Ref.
2021	Circle of Art Critics of Chile	Best Chilean Documentary	The Eternal Moment	Won	
2022	Valparaíso International Recovered Film Festival	National Documentary Competition - Best Film	The Eternal Moment	Won	
2023	Saraqusta Film Festival	Best Director	Sebastián Moreno	Won	

== TV Series ==
On January 9, 2022, a 4-episode documentary miniseries of the same name and by the same director premiered on TVN, exploring more aspects of Sergio Larraín's life.
