= The Journey of Monalisa =

- Promotional release poster
- Directed by: Nicole Costa
- Written by: Nicole Costa; Daniela Camino; Melisa Miranda
- Produced by: Daniela Camino; Rocío Romero
- Edited by: Melisa Miranda
- Music by: Kato Hideki
- Production company: Mimbre Producciones
- Release dates: 10 October 2019 (FICV); 7 November 2019 (Doc NYC); 11 July 2020 (Vimeo); 11 June 2021 (Ondamedia)
- Running time: 92 minutes
- Countries: Chile; United States
- Language: Spanish

The Journey of Monalisa (Spanish: El viaje de Monalisa) is a 2019 Chilean-American documentary film directed by Nicole Costa (in her directorial debut) and written by Costa, Daniela Camino and Melisa Miranda. It is about the journey of the transgender artist Iván Monalisa in her self-exile in New York where she worked as a prostitute.

== Synopsis ==
In 1995, the artist Iván Ojeda was invited to New York to study at the New Dramatists. When everything ends, instead of returning to Chile, he decides to change his name to Iván Monalisa and work as a transgender prostitute. 17 years later, Nicole Costa, his old friend from college and director of this film, arrives in New York to begin a journey with Monalisa to understand the reasons for Iván's self-exile.

== Release ==
The Journey of Monalisa had its world premiere on 10 October 2019, at the Valdivia International Film Festival, then screened on 7 November 2019, at the DOC NYC. It had its digital premiere on 11 July 2020, on Vimeo, almost a year later, it was released on 11 June 2021, in a limited and free way on Ondamedia.

== Accolades ==
Year	Award / Festival	Category	Recipient	Result	Ref.
2019	Bilbao Zinegoak International Film Festival	Best Documentary	The Journey of Monalisa	Won	
2020	Women's Film Festival	Special Jury Award	The Journey of Monalisa	Won	
2020	Network Film Festival	Margin Mention	The Journey of Monalisa	Won	
2020	Docs Valparaíso International Documentary Film Festival	Best National Feature Film	The Journey of Monalisa	Won	
2020	La Serena International Film Festival	National Feature Film Competition - Honorable Mention	The Journey of Monalisa	Won	
2020	LesGaiCineMad, Madrid International LGBT Film Festival	Best Documentary Feature Film	The Journey of Monalisa	Won	
2021	Cinema Tropical	Best Latinx USA Film	The Journey of Monalisa	Won	
