= I'd Like You to Live My Youth Again =

- Promotional release poster
- Me gustaría que vivieras mi juventud de nuevo
- Directed by: Nicolás Guzmán
- Produced by: Francisca Soto; Roberto Doveris; Alicia Scherson
- Cinematography: Ricardo Sánchez; Patricio Alfaro
- Edited by: Martín Santapau
- Production companies: ABC Motivo; Niña Niño Films
- Release dates: August 2022 (SANFIC); June 26, 2025 (Chile)
- Running time: 66 minutes
- Country: Chile
- Language: Spanish

I’d Like You to Live My Youth Again (Spanish: Me gustaría que vivieras mi juventud de nuevo) is a 2022 Chilean documentary film directed by Nicolás Guzmán. The film provides an intimate and introspective experience as two individuals, who barely know each other, exchange memories.

== Cast ==
- Victoria Watson
- Nerea Silva
- Demian

== Release ==
It premiered in mid-August 2022 as part of the Chilean Film Competition at the 18th Santiago International Film Festival, then premiered at the 26th Santiago International Documentary Festival at the end of November 2022.

The film was released commercially on June 26, 2025, in limited Chilean theaters.

== Reception ==
Dayanne González of El Agente Cine wrote: "I’d Like You to Live My Youth Again is a vulnerable and close feature film, which delivers an exploration of two sensitive stories that slowly come together. We know people who do not judge each other at any time, they only meet through empathy and from the vision of the world that each one has forged throughout their lives. Thus, we see an intimate result and we have the great opportunity to look at ourselves and understand that sometimes other people can help us rethink traumas and intimacies because going through memory together can make our own existence more bearable."
