= Nelson Brodt =

Chilean actor, director, dramatist and teacher

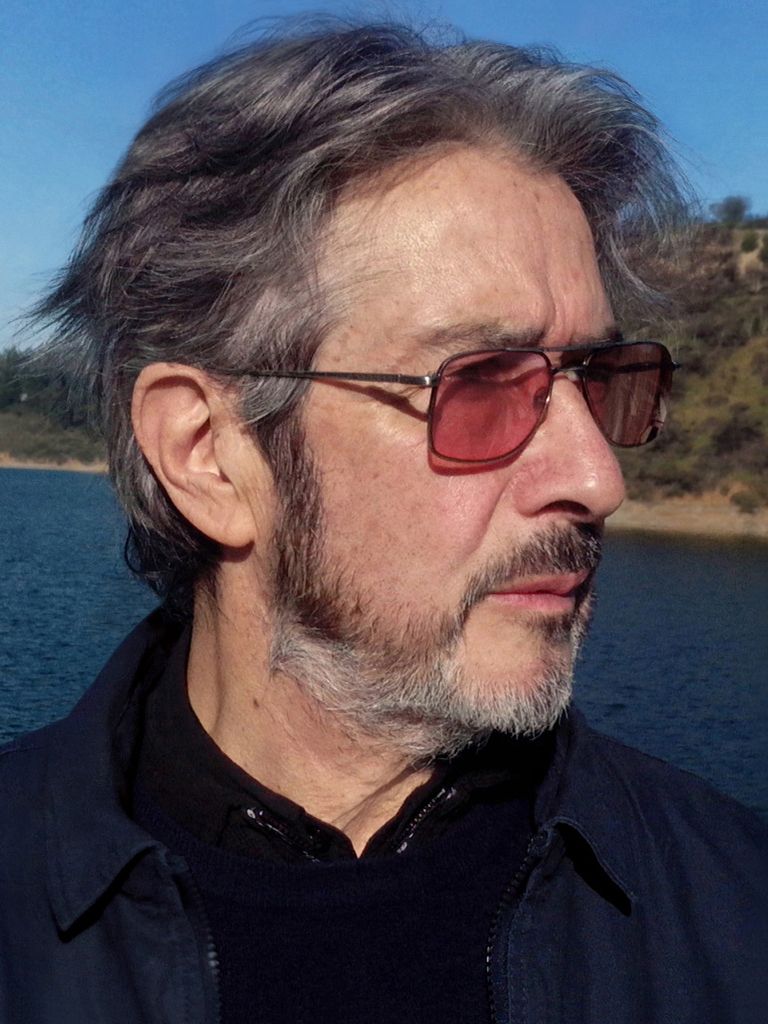
- Nelson Brodt in 2018
- Born: Nelson Omar Brodt Chávez; 7 August 1943 (age 82)
- Occupations: Actor, director, dramatist, teacher
- Awards: Santiago Municipal Literature Award (2004)

Nelson Omar Brodt Chávez (born 7 August 1943) is a Chilean actor, director, dramatist, and teacher, with an extensive career in theater, film, and television.

== Career ==
Nelson Brodt began his career at the Theater of the University of Concepción, where he developed an intense theatrical focus. In 1971 he emigrated to Santiago, where he participated as an actor in the Silvia Piñeiro Theater Company, the Los Cuatro Theater Company, the Nuevo Popular Theater, and the Chilean National Theater. In these years he also made his television debut on Arturo Moya Grau telenovelas such as María José and J. J. Juez.

In 1981 he directed Hechos consumados by Juan Radrigán. This production was well-received by critics and the public, both in Chile and abroad. He then adapted numerous works, including Candida Eréndida, Páramo, Chiloé cielos cubiertos, and Ánimas de día claro. He also dabbled in dramaturgy, writing plays such as Crónica de mujeres, El aprendiz, Siete golpes de arena, and Pide tres deseos. He took the last on a tour to Spain, where it received praise from specialized critics. In 2004 he was distinguished with the Santiago Municipal Literature Award, Theater Genre.

On television, he has participated in productions such as Martín Rivas, La represa, and La torre 10, highlighted by leading roles in La dama del balcón, Morir de amor, and La Quintrala. In 2008 he joined the cast of the hit series Los 80, where he had a lauded performance. In cinema he has acted in films such as Hechos consumados (1986), Fiestapatria (2007), and Y de pronto el amanecer (2017).

In parallel to his artistic activity, he has taught at various institutions and universities.

== Theater ==
=== Works as director ===
- Redoble fúnebre para lobos y corderos (1980), Juan Radrigán
- Hechos consumados (1981), Juan Radrigán
- Candida Eréndida (1983), Gabriel García Márquez
- Peter and the Wolf (1983), Music by Prokofiev
- Manuel Leonidas Donaire y las cinco mujeres que lloraban por él (1984), Alejandro Sieveking, Teatro Itinerante
- No Exit (1984). Jean-Paul Sartre
- Oedipus Rex (1984), Sophocles, adaptation by Isidora Aguirre
- Páramo (1987), Juan Rulfo, dramatic adaptation and direction by Nelson Brodt
- Rinconete y Cortadillo (1988), Miguel de Cervantes, dramatic adaptation by Jorge Díaz
- Chiloé cielos cubiertos (1989), María Asunción Requena
- Martín Rivas (1991), Alberto Blest Gana
- Alsino mapuche (1992). Pedro Prado, dramatic adaptation and direction by Nelson Brodt
- Tres marías y una rosa (1993), David Benavente, Theater of the University of Concepción
- El Buscón (1994), Quevedo, dramatic adaptation and direction by Nelson Brodt
- Mujeres con trenzas negras (1997), collective creation and by Mireya Moreno
- Pide tres deseos (1997), staging and direction by Nelson Brodt
- Life of Galileo (1998), Bertolt Brecht
- Crónica de mujeres (1999), staging and direction by Nelson Brodt
- El aprendiz (2000), staging and direction by Nelson Brodt
- Galanes (2001), Roberto Fontanarrosa
- Mamma mía, la policía (2001), Dario Fo
- Siete golpes de arena (2003), staging and direction by Nelson Brodt
- Les Précieuses ridicules (2011), Molière, dramatic adaptation and direction by Nelson Brodt
- Ánimas de día claro (2013), Alejandro Sieveking, National Theater

=== Works as playwright ===
- Pide tres deseos (1997), assembled based on figures from Chilean popular mythology
- Crónica de mujeres (1999), work about women's claims in the 20th century in Chile
- El aprendiz (2000), popular satirical comedy
- Siete golpes de arena (2004), Municipal Literature Award, Theater Genre

=== Works as actor ===
- Tela de cebolla (1971), Gloria Cordero, Teatro Nuevo Popular, CUT - UTE
- 25 años después (1971), Pedro Vianna, Company of Los Cuatro
- El embajador (1971), Isabel Allende, Company of Los Cuatro
- La maldición de la palabra (1972), Manuel Garrido, Teatro Nuevo Popular, CUT - UTE
- La viuda de Apablaza (1977), Germán Luco Cruchaga, direction by Rafael Benavente
- Rancagüa, 1814 (1978), Fernando Cuadra, National Theater, direction by Patricio Campos
- The Good Doctor (1979), Neil Simon, Chamber Theater, direction by Alejandro Castillo
- José (1980), Egon Wolff, Chamber Theater, direction by Alejandro Castillo
- Verde Julia, Paul Ableman, direction by Raúl Barrientos
- Three Sisters, Anton Chekhov, direction by Eugenio Guzmán, Theater of the University of Concepción
- Arlequín servidor de dos patrones, Carlo Goldoni, direction by Agustín Siré, Theater of the University of Concepción
- El umbral, José Chestá, direction by Roberto Navarrete, Theater of the University of Concepción
- The Zoo Story, Edward Albee, direction by Raúl Barrientos

== Filmography ==
=== Film ===
Year	Title	Role	Director
1972	State of Siege	Militante Tupamaro	Costa-Gavras
1973	La maldición de la palabra	Capataz	Pedro Sandor
1986	Hechos consumados	Emilio	Luis Vera
2007	Fiestapatria	Antonio	Luis Vera
2008	Pinochet boys	Agente CNI	Claudio del Valle
2014	Neruda	Ricardo Fonseca	Manuel Basoalto
2017	Y de pronto el amanecer	Padre de Pancho	Silvio Caiozzi

=== Television series and miniseries ===
Year	Title	Role	Channel
1979	Martín Rivas	Amador Molina	TVN
1981	Amelia	Sargento José Villalobos	TVN
1987	La Quintrala	Fray Juan de la Puente	TVN
1990	Crónica de un hombre santo	Padre Gutiérrez	Canal 13
1993	La patrulla del desierto	Comandante Vergara	Canal 13
2004	Mea culpa	Javier (Capítulo El Heredero)	TVN
2005	Mea culpa	Álvaro (Capítulo El Tambor)	TVN
2008 - 2010	Los 80	Pedro Herrera	Canal 13
2010	Adiós al séptimo de línea	Pedro Nolasco Videla	Mega
2011	Prófugos	Pájaro	HBO
2013	Maldito corazón	Del Valle	Chilevisión
2015	Juana Brava	Pepe	TVN

=== Telenovelas ===
Year	Title	Role	Channel
1975	María José		Canal 13
1975	La otra soledad		Canal 13
1975	J. J. Juez	Ramón	Canal 13
1976	Sol tardío	Jorge	TVN
1984	La represa	Lucho González	TVN
1984	La torre 10	Camilo Marco	TVN
1985	Morir de amor	Esteban / Stefano	TVN
1986	La dama del balcón	Milenko Dravichi	TVN
1989	Bravo	Salgado	Canal 13
2011	Peleles	Gerardo Marambio	Canal 13
2016	Preciosas	Segundo Castillo	Canal 13
2017	Wena profe	Don Pipa	TVN

== Academic activities ==
- He was creator, director, and teacher of the School of Acting, Bellas Artes neighborhood, Santiago, Chile.
- He was director of the USACH Theater Group.
- He was professor of "Introduction to Staging" and "Direction of Actors" at the National Film School.
- He participates in the Explora-CONICYT Program "Dissemination and Assessment of Science and Technology through Dramaturgy".
- He directed the first generation of graduates of Theater Acting, University of Valparaíso.
- He currently works as a professor of Theater at the University of Santiago, Chile, USACH.

== Awards and distinctions ==
- Santiago Municipal Literature Award, Theater Genre (20Q04), for Siete golpes de arena
- Hechos consumados, Best Play of the Year (1981), Art Critics' Circle Award
- La Cándida Eréndira, Best Play of the Year (1983), Art Critics' Circle Award
- Ánimas de día claro, Special Distinction (2013), Art Critics' Circle Award
- Hechos consumados, Best Production of the Season (1981), El Mercurio newspaper
- Alsino mapuche, Best Production (1992), Teatro de la Juventud Festival Award
- Pide tres deseos, Best Production and Best Director (1998), Ene Theater Festival, Municipality of Santiago
- Mujeres de trenzas negras, Won Traveling Theater Contest of the Ministry of Education
- The Good Doctor, "Laurel de Plata" Award of the newspaper Las Últimas Noticias (1979)
- Retrospective show of the work of Nelson Brodt (2000), Auditorium Telefónica, Santiago, Chile
- Invited to the First Festival of Latin American Theater, with La Cándida Eréndira, Córdoba, Argentina (1983)
- Invited to the "Comitato Internazionale 8 de Marzo" in Italy, tour with Mujeres con Trenzas Negras (2000)
- Invited to the National Unified Theater Encounter - TENU, meeting with teachers of Chilean theater (2010)
