= 30-Year-Old Toddler =

- Theatrical release poster
- Spanish: Eternamente adolescente
- Directed by: Gonzalo Badilla
- Written by: Gonzalo Badilla; Sebastián Badilla
- Produced by: Gonzalo Badilla; Sebastián Badilla
- Starring: Sebastián Badilla
- Cinematography: Iñaki Fermandois
- Edited by: Gonzalo Badilla; Iñaki Fernandois; Sebastián Badilla
- Music by: Tomás Castro M.
- Production companies: Bufonada; Paranoia Experience
- Release date: February 9, 2023
- Running time: 118 minutes
- Country: Chile
- Language: Spanish

30-Year-Old Toddler (Spanish: Eternamente adolescente, lit. 'Eternally adolescent') is a 2023 Chilean romantic comedy film written, co-produced, co-edited and directed by Gonzalo Badilla. It stars Sebastián Badilla as an unemployed actor who was once popular starring in The Pool Boy, and now yearns to become famous again. The rest of the cast is made up of Sofía Graffigna, Gabriela Fuentes, Sofía Bennett, Iñaki Larraín, Sofía Bennett, Begoña Pessis and Jesu Gilli.

== Synopsis ==
Pablo Silva is an actor who was famous and successful when he was just 15 years old when he starred in the film "The Pool Boy." Today, Pablo finds himself jobless, penniless, and friendless, still living in his parents' house, with a nostalgic desire to return to being the star he once was in his past. His luck begins to change when he reunites with his niece Lourdes, with whom he will have to spend an entire summer and from whom he will learn to see life in a different way.

== Cast ==
- Sebastián Badilla as Pablo Silva
- Sofía Graffigna as Lourdes
- Gabriela Fuentes
- Sofía Bennett
- Iñaki Larraín
- Sofía Bennett
- Begoña Pessis
- Jesu Gilli

== Release ==
The film was scheduled to be released in Chilean theaters on January 5, 2023, but was delayed until February 9 of that year.
