= Fiestapatria =

- Theatrical release poster
- Directed by: Luis R. Vera
- Written by: Luis R. Vera
- Produced by: Luis R. Vera Producciones E.I.R.L.
- Starring: Adela Secall
- Cinematography: Alfredo García
- Edited by: Carlos Ruz; Luis R. Vera
- Music by: Maurice Ravel
- Production companies: Inca Cine S.A.C. Luis R. Vera Producciones E.I.R.L.
- Release dates: April 26, 2007 (Chile); September 2007 (SSIFF); March 29, 2008 (Toulouse)
- Running time: 102 minutes
- Countries: Chile; Peru
- Language: Spanish

Fiestapatria (lit. 'National holiday') is a 2007 Chilean-Peruvian drama film written, directed and produced by Luis R. Vera. Starring Adela Secall. The film competed for the Colon de Oro at the 2007 Havana New Latin American Film Festival.

== Synopsis ==
Two families meet in a country house to celebrate national holidays and the engagement of their children, Macarena and Alvaro. Just before the party reaches its expected happy ending, young Macarena finds out about the family's best kept secret.

== Cast ==
The actors participating in this film are:

- Adela Secall as Macarena
- Nelson Brodt as Antonio
- Marcela Osorio as Isabel
- Tiago Correa as Álvaro
- Patricio Contreras as Ernesto
- Tatiana Astengo as Maruca
- Sergio Hernández as Don Álvaro
- Maricarmen Arrigorriaga as Irma
- Daniel Muñoz as Ray
- Katty Kowaleczko as Lorena
- Fernando Larraín as Manuel Eduardo
- Alex Zisis as Cesár
- Heidrun Breier as Jane
- Rosa Ramírez as Fresia
- Roxana Campos as Mercedes
- Koke Santa Ana as Enrique
- Carmen Disa Gutiérrez as Maggie
- Víctor Mix as Oldman Matías
- Jorge Gajardo as Pablo
- Mónica Carrasco as María Inés
- Marés González as Gabriela's Grandmother
- Viviana Herrera as Francisca
- Alfonso G. Santisteban as Father Sergio

== Production ==
Principal photography began in September 2005 and ended in January 2006 in the Valparaíso Region.

== Release ==
It premiered on April 26, 2007, in Chilean theaters, and at the end of that month it had its world premiere at the Tribeca Festival. Later, the film was screened at the end of September 2007 in the Horizontes Latinos section of the 55th San Sebastián International Film Festival and on March 29, 2008, at the Toulouse Latin America Film Festival.

== Reception ==
=== Box-office ===
After 9 weeks on the billboard, it caught a total of 8.794 viewers, collecting $20.905.956 Chilean pesos.

=== Accolades ===
Year	Award / Festival	Category	Recipient	Result	Ref.
2007	San Sebastián International Film Festival	Horizons Award	Fiestapatria	Nominated	
2007	Ibero-American Film Festival of Santa Cruz	Best Actress	Marcela Osorio	Won	
2007	Trieste Latin American Film Festival	Best Director	Luis R. Vera	Won	
2007	Havana New Latin American Film Festival	Colón de Oro	Fiestapatria	Nominated	
2008	Pedro Sienna Awards	Best Actress	Marcela Osorio	Won	
2008	Pedro Sienna Awards	Best Supporting Performance	Patricio Contreras	Nominated	
2008	Pedro Sienna Awards	Best Costume Design	Cristina Villar	Nominated	
2008	Cartagena Film Festival	Best Film	Luis R. Vera	Nominated	
