= Three Souls =

- Promotional release poster
- Directed by: José Guerrero Urzúa
- Written by: José Guerrero Urzúa
- Produced by: Jhon Aguiño; José Guerrero Urzúa; Patricio Morales Pinto; Sandra Cárcamo; Sebastián König Besa
- Cinematography: Nicolás Castillo Mazu
- Edited by: Bárbara Mellado Piña
- Music by: Luis Abarca Carvajal
- Production company: Palimpsesto Films
- Release date: August 14, 2021 (Fort Smith International Film Festival)
- Running time: 95 minutes
- Country: Chile
- Language: Spanish

Three Souls (Spanish: Tres almas) is a 2021 Chilean Western drama film written and directed by José Guerrero Urzúa. It is about 3 pirquineros that will come to mind a common memory regarding the tragedy that occurred in the high Atacama mountain range. It is the second film that tells the story of the Quispe sisters after The Quispe Girls (2013).

The film was named on the shortlist for Chilean's entry for the Academy Award for Best International Feature Film at the 94th Academy Awards, but it was not selected.

== Synopsis ==
On December 3, 2000, three pirquineros rode horses to a long-awaited gold vein located in the high Atacama mountain range. Upon arriving at the place, they set up a camp in the area where the tragedy occurred with the Quispe sisters in December 1974, from there traumatic, violent and macabre memories related to that event will emerge in their heads.

== Cast ==
The actors participating in this film are:

- Daniela Milla
- Ermelinda Milla
- Paolo Segura
- Sandra Cárcamo
- Alfredo Poblete
- Gonzalo Jara
- Danilo Palacios
- Claudio Pérez

== Production ==
Principal photography began in March 2019 in Atacama, Chile.

== Release ==
Three Souls had its world premiere on August 14, 2021, at the Fort Smith International Film Festival, then it was screened in September of the same year at the 12th Cinefantasy International Film Festival.
