= Microfilia =

- Theatrical release poster
- Directed by: Nehoc Davis
- Written by: Jaime Capó
- Produced by: Alfredo Rates; Catherine Wyler; Pablo del Río
- Starring: Julio Briceño; Isabel Leal Cartes; Marcia del Canto; Teresa Hales; Domingo Ravanal
- Cinematography: Paco Toledo
- Edited by: Armand Pontous; Nehoc Davis
- Music by: Jaime Garrido
- Production company: Cinemutual
- Release dates: August 16, 2007 (SANFIC); March 13, 2008 (Chile); June 2008 (Florianópolis)
- Running time: 73 minutes
- Country: Chile
- Language: Spanish
- Box office: $12,159

Microfilia (lit. 'Microphilia') is a 2007 Chilean comedy film directed by Nehoc Davis and written by Jaime Capó. Starring Julio Briceño, Isabel Leal Cartes, Marcia del Canto, Teresa Hales and Domingo Ravanal.

== Synopsis ==
Isabel is a 15-year-old girl, daughter and niece of drivers, who learned to drive from the age of eight; while driving a bus in which a series of curious passengers travel, he must endure the attacks of "El correcaminos", the most dangerous driver in Santiago.

== Cast ==
- Julio Briceño
- Isabel Leal Cartes
- Marcia del Canto
- Teresa Hales
- Domingo Ravanal

== Release ==
Microfilia had its world premiere on August 16, 2007, at the Santiago International Film Festival. It was commercially released on March 13, 2008, in Chilean theaters, then it was screened at the beginning of June 2008 at the Florianópolis Audiovisual Mercosur Festival.
