= Grimanesa Jiménez =

Chilean actress (1937–2023)

- Born: Grimanesa Ethel Jiménez Lockett; 21 May 1937; Santiago, Chile
- Died: 18 September 2023 (aged 86); Santiago, Chile

Grimanesa Ethel Jiménez Lockett (21 May 1937 – 18 September 2023) was a Chilean television, stage and film actress, whose career spanned over 45 years.

== Life and career ==
Born in Santiago, Jiménez studied acting at the drama schools of the University of Chile and of the Pontifical Catholic University of Chile. After making her professional debut at the Teatro Ictus, she decided to study opera and enrolled at the Conservatorio Nacional de Música, but following the 1973 coup d'état she interrupted her studies. She made her television debut in 1977, in the TVN telenovela La Colorina.

Specialized in comedic roles, Jiménez is best known for the role of Diana "La Jirafa" Smith in the TNC sitcom Los Venegas (1989–1994). Her credits also include several Canal 13 telenovelas, and several art films, including Historia de un roble solo by Silvio Caiozzi and Las mujeres de mi cas by Valentina Reyes, which got her a Caleuche Award nomination for best actress. In 2020, she was a contestant at MasterChef Celebrity. She died on 18 September 2023, at the age of 86.
