= Superno =

- Film poster
- Directed by: Abel Mekasha
- Written by: Abel Mekasha
- Produced by: Abel Mekasha
- Starring: Esubalew Nasir
- Cinematography: Abel Mekasha
- Edited by: Abel Mekasha
- Music by: Natneal Solomon
- Production companies: Cipher Media; Cintamani Films
- Release date: 2021
- Running time: 96 minutes
- Countries: Ethiopia; Chile
- Language: Amharic
- Budget: $20.000 USD

Superno is a 2021 Ethiopian-Chilean science fiction psychological thriller film written, directed, produced and edited by Abel Mekasha in his directorial debut. Starring Esubalew Nasir. The film was named on the shortlist for Chilean's entry for the Academy Award for Best International Feature Film at the 94th Academy Awards, but it was not selected.

== Premise ==
A man finds himself in a solitary environment, convinced that he is being held captive. However, he is not. The only means of communication available to him is a telephone in front of him.

== Cast ==
- Esubalew Nasir
- Debre Libanos
