= La Provisoria =

- Promotional release poster
- Directed by: Melina Fernández da Silva; Nicolás Meta
- Written by: Melina Fernández da Silva; Nicolás Meta
- Starring: Andrés Ciavaglia; Ana Pauls; Juan Chapur; Sol Bordigoni; Nicolás Juárez
- Cinematography: Christian Carmodona; Emilio Velázquez
- Music by: Nicolas Carcagno
- Production company: Cooperativa Comunidad del Cine
- Release date: November 17, 2022 (Argentina)
- Running time: 101 minutes
- Countries: Argentina; Chile; Mexico; Colombia; Brazil; France
- Language: Spanish

La Provisoria (lit. 'The Provisional') is a 2022 comedy-drama film written and directed by Melina Fernández da Silva and Nicolás Meta. Starring Andrés Ciavaglia, Ana Pauls, Juan Chapur, Sol Bordigoni and Nicolás Juárez. It is a co-production between Argentina, Chile, Mexico, Brazil, Colombia and France. It premiered on November 17, 2022, in Argentine theaters.

The film was named on the shortlist for Chilean's entry for the Academy Award for Best International Feature Film at the 95th Academy Awards, but it was not selected.

== Synopsis ==
Five bohemian young people try to adapt to city life, which doesn't suit them, when they begin living in an old house surrounded by nature. The imminent yet uncertain demolition, the spirit of camaraderie, and a humble abundance that fills the house drive them to continue their journey in directions more aligned with their inner balance.

== Cast ==
The actors participating in this film are:

- Andrés Ciavaglia as Fede
- Ana Pauls as Mariel
- Juan Chapur as Joaco
- Sol Bordigoni as Viole
- Nicolás Juárez as Kito
- Albertina Vázquez
