= Sergio Larraín =

Chilean photographer

Sergio Larraín Echeñique (November 5, 1931 – February 7, 2012) was a Chilean photographer. He was a member of Magnum Photos during the 1960s. He is considered the most important Chilean photographer in history, making street photography, often of street children, using "shadow and angles in a way few had tried before."

Photographs he took in Paris by Notre Dame Cathedral, which revealed scenes of a couple only upon processing, became the basis for Julio Cortázar's story, "Las Babas del Diablo", "The Devil's Drool", which in turn inspired Michelangelo Antonioni's 1966 film Blowup.

== Life and work ==
Larraín was born in 1931 in Santiago, into one of Chile's wealthiest families. He joined Magnum Photos as an associate in 1959 and became a full member in 1961. He worked professionally for a little over ten years, stopping in 1972. Larraín is best known for his street photography, often of street children, "and use of shadow and angles in a way few had tried before."

Following the Bolivian guru Oscar Ichazo, he retreated from public and professional life to live in a Chilean mountain village, Tulahuén, and at an even more remote refuge that he built, taking up calligraphy and meditation. He also wrote and continued to make personal photography, including that of the Chilean port of Valparaíso. He died in 2012 at the age of 80.

== Publications by Larraín ==
- Sergio Larrain: London 1958–59. Stockport: Dewi Lewis, 1998. ISBN 9781899235711.
  - Expanded edition. London: Thames and Hudson, 2021. ISBN 978-0500545416. With an introduction by Agnès Sire and an essay by Roberto Bolaño.
- Sergio Larrain: Photographs by Sergio Larrain. New York: Aperture, 2013. ISBN 978-1-59711-259-8. Edited and with text by Agnès Sire, and with an essay by Gonzalo Leiva Quijada.
  - Sergio Larrain: Vagabond Photographer. London: Thames & Hudson, 2013. ISBN 978-0500544280.
- Valparaiso. New York: Aperture, 2017. ISBN 978-1597114134. With texts by Larraín, Pablo Neruda and Agnès Sire.

== Collection ==
- Museum of Modern Art, New York City
