= 130 Children =

- Theatrical release poster
- Spanish: 130 Hermanos
- Directed by: Ainara Aparici
- Written by: Ainara Aparici; Susana Quiroz
- Produced by: Ainara Aparici; Daniela Camino
- Cinematography: Eduardo Guaita
- Edited by: Rosa Ordoñez
- Music by: Edu Svart, Max Zagal
- Production companies: Atomica Films; Sputnik Films; Kuter Casa Productora; Mimbre Films
- Release date: May 5, 2022
- Running time: 71 minutes
- Countries: Chile; Costa Rica
- Language: Spanish

130 Children (Spanish: 130 Hermanos, lit. '130 Brothers') is a 2022 Chilean-Costa Rican documentary film directed by Ainara Aparici (in her directorial debut) and written by Aparici & Susana Quiroz. It depicts a large family, starting with 7 members and ending with 130, raising 30-40 heart children per generation while the parents grow older.

== Synopsis ==
In San José, Costa Rica, Melba (65) and Víctor (70) have a constantly expanding family, with six biological children and over 130 foster children in the past 40 years. Despite their advancing age, the couple continues to embrace the challenges of raising a large family. Some of their children are now embarking on their own paths towards adulthood, while a new child is gradually integrating into this bustling home. Despite the adventures and difficulties that come with such a large family, it continues to grow and thrive.

== Background story ==
In 2010, the director Ainara Aparici began to travel around Latin America, she arrived in Costa Rica and there she met Melba and was impressed with her story and decided to make a film.

== Release ==
130 Children premiered on May 5, 2022, in Chilean theaters.

== Campaign ==
130 Children also inspired the team to create a foundation and a campaign called Acoger es, which seeks to promote and publicize the importance of foster families in Chile.
