= Gaucho Americano =

- Theatrical release poster
- Directed by: Nicolás Molina
- Written by: Valentina Arango; Paula López; Nicolás Molina
- Produced by: Joséphine Schroeder
- Cinematography: Nicolás Molina
- Edited by: Camila Mercadal
- Music by: Ángel Parra
- Production company: Pequén Producciones
- Release dates: April 29, 2021 (Hot Docs); August 2021 (SANFIC); September 8, 2022 (Chile)
- Running time: 75 minutes
- Country: Chile
- Languages: Spanish; English

Gaucho Americano (lit. 'American Gaucho') is a 2021 Chilean documentary film directed by Nicolás Molina and written by Molina, Valentina Arango and Paula López. It presents the life of Joaquín and Víctor, 2 gauchos from Chilean Patagonia who find themselves alone in an American ranch to do a job.

The film was named on the shortlist for Chilean's entry for the Academy Award for Best International Feature Film at the 95th Academy Awards, but it was not selected.

== Synopsis ==
Joaquín and Victor, both gauchos from Chilean Patagonia, are hired as muleteers on a ranch in the United States. Accompanied only by their dogs and horses, they will have to protect their flocks of thousands of sheep from predators, in a foreign land that they believe they can dominate.

== Cast ==
- Joaquín Agüil
- Victor Jara

== Release ==
Gaucho Americano had its world premiere on April 29, 2021, at the Hot Docs Canadian International Documentary Festival. It was screened in mid-August 2021 for the first time in Chilean territory at the Santiago International Film Festival. It was commercially released on September 8, 2022, in Chilean theaters.

== Reception ==
=== Critical reception ===
Nikki Baughan from ScreenDaily describes Guacho Americano as a passive and hypnotic documentary that has a lot to say about immigration, rural life, and generational differences. In addition, to highlight the photography work of the director.

=== Accolades ===
Year	Award / Festival	Category	Recipient	Result	Ref.
2021	Hot Docs Canadian International Documentary	International Spectrum - Best Documentary	Gaucho Americano	Nominated	
2021	Santiago International Film Festival	Grand Jury Prize - International Feature Length	Gaucho Americano	Nominated	
2021	Santiago International Documentary Festival	National Competition - Best Film	Gaucho Americano	Nominated	
2021	DocsMX: The International Documentary Film Festival of Mexico City	Our America - Best Documentary	Gaucho Americano	Nominated	
2022	Trento Film Festival	Genziana d'Oro	Gaucho Americano	Won	
