= Luis R. Vera =

Chilean film director (born 1952)

Luis Roberto Vera Vargas (born 1952) is a Chilean film director, producer, writer and professor of communications.

Vargas was born in Santiago, Chile. He left the country following the 1973 military coup and came first to Peru as a refugee, and then later to Romania where he studied in film at the National University of Theatre and Fil “I.L.Caragiale” UNATC. In 1979, he came as a refugee to Sweden.

He is the father of the Swedish Left Party politician America Vera Zavala.
