= Valdivia International Film Festival =

Festival Internacional de Cine de Valdivia
- Location: Valdivia, Chile
- Founded: 1993
- Awards: I. - International Feature length Films: Best Feature Film - Jury Special Award - Jury Special Mention Award; II. - Chilean Feature Film: - Best Feature Film - Jury Special Award III. - International Short Films: -Best Short Film Award IV. - Film Schools: -Best Short Film Award
- Hosted by: The city of Valdivia.
- Language: Spanish
- Website: http://www.ficvaldivia.cl/

The Valdivia International Film Festival (Spanish: Festival Internacional de Cine de Valdivia (FICV o FICVALDIVIA)) is an international film exhibition and competition, held annually in the city of Valdivia, Los Rios region, Chile.

The festival begun in 1993 to celebrate the 30th anniversary of the Cine Club of the Universidad Austral de Chile. A competition was included the following year, labeled as "Valdivia Cine & Video". That event became a milestone to cultural activity in southern Chile, promising at that time to become the greatest film event in the country. The early versions of the festival were oriented to ecological issues. From that point the characteristic trophy award emerged: the Pudú (The Pudú is a small kind of deer, typical of southern Chile). In 2001 the feature film competition category started, becoming the Festival into the most important film event in Chile.

== Awards ==
- International Feature length Films: - Best Feature Film - Jury Special Award - Jury Special Mention Award

- Chilean Feature Film: - Best Feature Film - Jury Special Award

- International Short Films: -Best Short Film Award

- Film Schools: -Best Short Film Award

== Categories ==
- Feature Length International Films.

- Feature Length Chilean Films.

- Latin American Short Films.

- Film Schools Short Film Competition.

== See also ==
- Santiago International Film Festival
- Viña del Mar International Film Festival
- Cinema of Chile
