= Mamoun Hassan =

Saudi-born British filmmaker (1937–2022)

Mamoun Hamid Hassan (12 December 1937 – 29 July 2022) was a Saudi-born British screenwriter, director, editor, producer and teacher of film who held prominent positions in British cinema during the 1970s and 80s, frequently backing experimental work. He was the first head of production of the British Film Institute (BFI) and later managing director of the National Film Finance Corporation (NFFC).

== Life and career ==
Mamoun Hamid Hassan was born in Jeddah, in Saudi Arabia on 12 December 1937. He began his career in film working as an editing assistant with Kevin Brownlow. He made his first distributed short film 'The Meeting', in 1965, for which he was awarded a best prize award at the Oberhausen Film Festival. He was the first head of production of the British Film Institute from 1971, in which post he instigated the BFI's policy of backing low-budget feature films that charted in new directions; he assisted the director Bill Douglas by securing crew and funding to make The Bill Douglas Trilogy (1972–78), and financially supported the production of Winstanley (1975). Hassan was the first to support film that was made by Black British filmmakers about their experiences in Britain: Horace Ove's Pressure. After leaving the BFI he taught at the National Film and Television School at Beaconsfield. In 1979 he wrote a policy paper for AIP (of which he was a founder member) on the future of the National Film Finance Corporation, which led to him being appointed to the board by the Minister of Trade and Industry. Subsequent to this, he was appointed Managing Director. In this position he backed the film Babylon (1980), Gregory's Girl, Britannia Hospital, Raymond Briggs' When the Wind Blows and again helped Douglas in the production of Comrades (1986). When he wasn't able to support film directly, he would use his influence to ensure they were made. These include Merchant Ivory's Heat and Dust and Merry Christmas Mr Lawrence. Despite the "brave funding choices" and renewed creativity of the NFFC under Hassan, it was abolished in 1985. Afterwards he worked as a film producer, screenwriter, consultant, lecturer and teacher in the field of cinema.

Hassan died from a heart attack at his flat in Hampstead, London, on 29 July 2022, at the age of 84.

== Filmography ==
Year	Film	Credit
2019	Spider	Creative consultant
2012	My Brother the Devil	Editing consultant
2009	Bill Douglas: Reflections on His Trilogy	Interviewee
2008	La Buena Vida	Producer, Screenplay
2006	Affairs of the House	Special thanks
2006	Bill Douglas: Intent on Getting the Image	Cast member
2004	Machuca	Producer, Screenplay
1988	Distant Voices, Still Lives	Special thanks
1986	When the Wind Blows	Executive Producer - uncredited, Special thanks
1985	No Surrender	Producer
1985	Dance with a Stranger	Executive Producer - uncredited
1984	Another Country	Executive Producer - uncredited
1982	Britannia Hospital	Executive Producer - uncredited
1976	Some of the Palestinians	Director, Editor
1975	Winstanley	Executive Producer - uncredited, Special thanks
1974	A Private Enterprise	Executive Producer - uncredited, Special thanks
1971	Here Are Ladies	Editor
1969	Wild and Free Twice Daily (Documentary)	Editor
1966	Turner (Documentary short)	Editor
1964	The Meeting	Director, Producer, Writer

== Television Credits ==
Year	Production	Credit
1990	Movie Masterclass (Series 2) - Program 1: World of Apu	Deviser, Producer, Presenter
1988	Movie Masterclass (Series 1) - Program 1: Seven Samurai	Deviser, Producer, Presenter
1973	Cinema Now (TV Series) - Two Young Film Makers	Self
1968	Contrasts (TV Series) (1 Episode)	Director
1968	Living on the Box	Director
