= Ariel Award for Best Ibero-American Film =

Ariel Award category

Ariel Award for Best Ibero-American film
- Awarded for: Best Feature Film from Ibero-America (excluding Mexico)
- Country: Mexico
- Presented by: Academia Mexicana de Artes y Ciencias Cinematográficas (AMACC)
- First award: Midnight (2000)
- Currently held by: Society of the Snow (2024)

The Ariel Award for Best Ibero-American film is a film award category created in 2000, part of the Ariel Awards, which are presented by the Academia Mexicana de Artes y Ciencias Cinematográficas (AMACC).

== Winners and nominees ==
A list of winners and nominees is presented as follows (winners are listed first, highlighted in boldface, and indicated with a double dagger: ‡):

=== 2000s ===
Year	English title	Original title	Director(s)	Country
2000 (42nd)
2000 (42nd)	**Midnight ‡**	**O Primeiro Dia**	**Walter Salles and Daniela Thomas**	**Brazil**
2000 (42nd)	All About My Mother	Todo sobre mi madre	Pedro Almodóvar	Spain
2000 (42nd)	La vendedora de rosas		Víctor Gaviria	Colombia
2001 (43rd)
2001 (43rd)	**Alone ‡**	**Solas**	**Benito Zambrano**	**Spain**
2001 (43rd)	Ratas, Ratones, Rateros		Sebastián Cordero	Ecuador
2001 (43rd)	Olympic Garage	Garage Olimpo	Marco Bechis	Argentina
2002 (44th)
2002 (44th)	**Miel para Oshún ‡**		**Humberto Solás**	**Cuba**
2002 (44th)	A Cab for Three	Taxi para tres	Orlando Lübbert	Chile
2002 (44th)	El bien esquivo		Augusto Tamayo San Román	Peru
2003 (45th)
2003 (45th)	**The Last Train ‡**	**Corazón de fuego**	**Diego Arsuaga**	**Uruguay**
2003 (45th)	Como el gato y el ratón		Rodrigo Triana	Colombia
2003 (45th)	Nada +		Juan Carlos Cremata	Cuba
2004 (46th)
2004 (46th)	**Mondays in the Sun ‡**	**Los lunes al sol**	**Fernando León de Aranoa**	**Spain**
2004 (46th)	Seawards Journey	El viaje hacia el mar	Fernando Casanova	Uruguay
2004 (46th)	Intimate Stories	Historias mínimas	Carlos Sorín	Argentina
2005 (47th)
2005 (47th)	**Whisky ‡**		**Juan Pablo Rebella and Pablo Stoll**	**Uruguay**
2005 (47th)	Take My Eyes	Te doy mis ojos	Icíar Bollaín	Spain
2005 (47th)	Machuca		Andrés Wood	Chile
2006 (48th)
2006 (48th)	**Sumas y restas ‡**		**Víctor Gaviria**	**Colombia**
2006 (48th)	The Sea Inside	Mar adentro	Alejandro Amenábar	Spain
2006 (48th)	Play		Alicia Scherson	Chile
2007 (49th)
2007 (49th)	**The Secret Life of Words ‡**	**La vida secreta de las palabras**	**Isabel Coixet**	**Spain**
2007 (49th)	In Bed	En la cama	Matías Bize	Chile
2007 (49th)	Alice		Marco Martins	Portugal
2008 (50th)
2008 (50th)	**XXY ‡**		**Lucía Puenzo**	**Argentina**
2008 (50th)	Elite Squad	Tropa de Elite	José Padilha	Brazil
2008 (50th)	Satanás		Andrés Baiz	Colombia
2009 (51st)
2009 (51st)	**Lion's Den ‡**	**Leonera**	**Pablo Trapero**	**Argentina**
2009 (51st)	Dog Eat Dog	Perro come perro	Carlos Moreno	Colombia
2009 (51st)	Tony Manero		Pablo Larraín	Chile

=== 2010s ===
Year	English title	Original title	Director(s)	Country
2010 (52nd)
2010 (52nd)	**The Secret in Their Eyes ‡**	**El secreto de sus ojos**	**Juan José Campanella**	**Argentina**
2010 (52nd)	The Maid	La nana	Sebastián Silva	Chile
2010 (52nd)	The Milk of Sorrow	La teta asustada	Claudia Llosa	Peru
2011 (53rd)
2011 (53rd)	**José Martí: el ojo del canario ‡**		**Fernando Pérez**	**Cuba**
2011 (53rd)	**Even the Rain ‡**	**También la lluvia**	**Icíar Bollaín**	**Spain**
2011 (53rd)	The Man Next Door	El hombre de al lado	Gastón Duprat & Mariano Cohn	Argentina
2012 (54th)
2012 (54th)	**Black Bread ‡**	**Pa negre**	**Agustí Villaronga**	**Spain**
2012 (54th)	The Zero Hour	La hora cero	Diego Velasco	Venezuela
2012 (54th)	Violeta Went to Heaven	Violeta se fue a los cielos	Andrés Wood	Chile
2013 (55th)
2013 (55th)	**Blancanieves ‡**		**Pablo Berger**	**Spain**
2013 (55th)	No		Pablo Larraín	Chile
2013 (55th)	Pescador		Sebastián Cordero	Ecuador
2014 (56th)
2014 (56th)	**Gloria** ‡		**Sebastián Lelio**	**Chile**
2014 (56th)	The German Doctor	Wakolda	Lucía Puenzo	Argentina
2014 (56th)	Anina		Alfredo Soderguit	Uruguay
2014 (56th)	Melaza		Carlos Lechuga	Cuba
2014 (56th)	15 Years and One Day	15 años y un día	Gracia Querejeta	Spain
2015 (57th)
2015 (57th)	**Wild Tales** ‡	**Relatos salvajes**	**Damián Szifron**	**Argentina**
2015 (57th)	Behavior	Conducta	Ernesto Daranas	Cuba
2015 (57th)	Marshland	La isla mínima	Alberto Rodríguez	Spain
2015 (57th)	Mr. Kaplan		Álvaro Brechner	Uruguay
2015 (57th)	Bad Hair	Pelo malo	Mariana Rondón	Venezuela
2016 (58th)
2016 (58th)	**Embrace of the Serpent** ‡	**El abrazo de la serpiente**	**Ciro Guerra**	**Colombia**
2016 (58th)	The Clan	El clan	Pablo Trapero	Argentina
2016 (58th)	The Club	El club	Pablo Larraín	Chile
2016 (58th)	A Wolf at the Door	O Lobo Atrás da Porta	Fernando Coimbra	Brazil
2016 (58th)	Truman		Cesc Gay	Spain
2017 (59th)
2017 (59th)	**The Distinguished Citizen** ‡	**El ciudadano ilustre**	**Gastón Duprat & Mariano Cohn**	**Argentina**
2017 (59th)	**The Second Mother** ‡	**Que Horas Ela Volta?**	**Anna Muylaert**	**Brazil**
2017 (59th)	Anna		Jacques Toulemonde Vidal	Colombia
2017 (59th)	Such Is Life in the Tropics	Sin muertos no hay carnaval	Sebastián Cordero	Ecuador
2017 (59th)	The Fury of a Patient Man	Tarde para la ira	Raúl Arévalo	Spain
2018 (60th)
2018 (60th)	**A Fantastic Woman** ‡	**Una mujer fantástica**	**Sebastián Lelio**	**Chile**
2018 (60th)	Aquarius		Kleber Mendonça Filho	Brazil
2018 (60th)	The Animal's Wife	La mujer del animal	Víctor Gaviria	Colombia
2018 (60th)	Last Days in Havana	Últimos días en La Habana	Fernando Pérez	Cuba
2018 (60th)	Zama		Lucrecia Martel	Argentina
2019 (61st)
2019 (61st)	**Birds of Passage** ‡	**Pájaros de verano**	**Cristina Gallego and Ciro Guerra**	**Colombia**
2019 (61st)	Champions	Campeones	Javier Fesser	Spain
2019 (61st)	El Angel	El ángel	Luis Ortega	Argentina
2019 (61st)	A Twelve-Year Night	La noche de 12 años	Álvaro Brechner	Uruguay
2019 (61st)	The Heiresses	Las herederas	Marcelo Martinessi	Paraguay

=== 2020s ===
Year	English title	Original title	Director(s)	Country
2020 (62nd)
2020 (62nd)	**Pain and Glory** ‡	**Dolor y gloria**	**Pedro Almodóvar**	**Spain**
2020 (62nd)	The Invisible Life of Eurídice Gusmão	A Vida Invisível	Karim Aïnouz	Brazil
2020 (62nd)	Heroic Losers	La odisea de los giles	Sebastián Borensztein	Argentina
2020 (62nd)	Monos		Alejandro Landes	Colombia
2020 (62nd)	Retablo		Alvaro Delgado-Aparicio	Peru
2021 (63rd)
2021 (63rd)	**The Mole Agent** ‡	**El agente topo**	**Maite Alberdi**	**Chile**
2021 (63rd)	Babenco: Tell Me When I Die	Babenco - Alguém Tem que Ouvir o Coração e Dizer: Parou	Bárbara Paz	Brazil
2021 (63rd)	Forgotten We'll Be	El olvido que seremos	Fernando Trueba	Colombia
2021 (63rd)	La Llorona		Jayro Bustamante	Guatemala
2021 (63rd)	Schoolgirls	Las niñas	Pilar Palomero	Spain
2022 (64th)
2022 (64th)	**The Good Boss** ‡	**El buen patrón**	**Fernando León de Aranoa**	**Spain**
2022 (64th)	Cadejo blanco		Justin Lerner	Guatemala
2022 (64th)	The Intruder	El prófugo	Natalia Meta	Argentina
2022 (64th)	Memoria		Apichatpong Weerasethakul	Colombia
2022 (64th)	My Brothers Dream Awake	Mis hermanos sueñan despiertos	Claudia Huaiquimilla	Chile
2023 (65th)
2023 (65th)	**Argentina 1985** ‡		**Santiago Mitre**	**Argentina**
2023 (65th)	1976		Manuela Martelli	Chile
2023 (65th)	The Beasts	As bestas	Rodrigo Sorogoyen	Spain
2023 (65th)	Carajita		Silvina Schnicer, Ulises Porra	Dominican Republic
2023 (65th)	The Kings of the World	Los reyes del mundo	Laura Mora	Colombia
2024 (66th)
2024 (66th)	**Society of the Snow**	**La sociedad de la nieve**	**J.A. Bayona**	**Spain**
2024 (66th)	Behind the Mist	Al otro lado de la niebla	Sebastián Cordero	Ecuador
2024 (66th)	La hembrita		Laura Amelia Guzmán	Dominican Republic
2024 (66th)	The Settlers	Los colonos	Felipe Gálvez Haberle	Chile
2024 (66th)	Puan		María Alché, Benjamín Naishtat	Argentina
2025 (67th)
2025 (67th)	**Kill the Jockey**	**El jockey**	**Luis Ortega**	**Argentina**
2025 (67th)	The 47	El 47	Marcel Barrena	Spain
2025 (67th)	In Her Place	El lugar de la otra	Maite Alberdi	Chile
2025 (67th)	The Dog Thief	El ladrón de perros	Vinko Tomičić	Bolivia
2025 (67th)	Rita		Jayro Bustamante	Guatemala
2026 (68th)
2026 (68th)	**A Poet**	**Un poeta**	**Simón Mesa Soto**	**Colombia**
2026 (68th)	Belén		Dolores Fonzi	Argentina
2026 (68th)	The Mysterious Gaze of the Flamingo	La misteriosa mirada del flamenco	Diego Céspedes	Chile
2026 (68th)	Sundays	Los domingos	Alauda Ruiz de Azúa	Spain
2026 (68th)	Manas		Marianna Brennand	Brazil

== See also ==
- Platino Award for Best Ibero-American Film
- Goya Award for Best Ibero-American Film
