= Memories of a Teenager =

- DVD cover for English version
- Directed by: Lucas Santa Ana
- Written by: Lucas Santa Ana
- Produced by: Alberto Masliah; Daniel Chocron
- Starring: Renato Quattordio; Malena Narvay; Thomas Lepera; Jerónimo Giocondo Bosia
- Cinematography: Paul Galarza
- Edited by: Marcela Truglio; German Cantore
- Music by: Mariano A. Fernandez
- Distributed by: Cine.Ar
- Release date: July 23, 2020
- Country: Argentina
- Language: Spanish

Memories of a Teenager (Spanish title Yo, Adolescente) is a 2020 Argentine teen drama film directed by Lucas Santa Ana. The movie stars Renato Quattordio, Malena Narvay, Thomás Lepera, and Jerónimo Giocondo Bosia. The movie premiered on July 23, 2020, on the Cine.Ar channel. Netflix acquired the rights to release the film on November 12 of the same year.

== Plot ==
Nicolás "Zabo" Zamorano, between 2004 and 2005, begins writing a blog about his daily life titled Yo, Adolescente (literally I, a Teenager) following the suicide of a close friend and a fire at a nearby concert that results in multiple deaths. Shortly after, Nicolás begins to question his sexuality, and becomes intimate with several people.

== Critical reception ==
Ben Turner, writing for The Pink Lens, found that the film "perfectly captures the confusion of adolescence" but also criticized the film's portrayal of suicide, finding it sensationalistic, romanticized, simplistic, and "a cheap book-end".

== Cast ==
- Renato Quattordio as Nicolás "Zabo" Zamorano
- Malena Narvay as Tina
- Thomás Lepera as Tomás
- Jerónimo Giocondo Bosia as Ramiro
- Walter Rodríguez Pez as Agustín
- Tomás Wicz as Checho
- Tomás Raimondi as Lucho
- Majo Chicar as Camila
- Agustina Cabo as María
- Gregorio Barrios as Fran
- Tomás Agüero as Pol
- María Lía Bagnoli as Mamá de Zabo
- Hernán Morán as Papá de Zabo
- Bruno Giganti as Mateo
- Carolina Unrein as Florencia

== Awards and critical ratings ==
Professional ratings
Review scores
Source	Rating
Todas Las Críticas link	66 / 100
IMDb link	6.5/10 stars

List of awards and nominations
Year	Organization	Category	Nominee(s)	Results	Refs.
2019	Festival Internacional de Cine de Viña del Mar	Best Feature Film	Lucas Santa Ana	Won	
2019	Festival de Cine Iberoamericano de Huelva	Best Feature Film	Lucas Santa Ana	Won	
2019	Festival de Cine Iberoamericano de Huelva	Best Actor	Renato Quattordio	Won	
2020	Festival Internacional de Cine en Guadalajara	Best Film	Lucas Santa Ana	Nominated	
2021	Premios Cóndor de Plata	Male Revelation	Renato Quattordio	Won	
2021	Premios Sur	Best New Actor	Thomás Lepera	Nominated	
