= Christmas (film) =

2009 drama film by Sebastián Lelio

- Film poster
- Directed by: Sebastián Lelio
- Written by: Gonzalo Maza; Sebastián Lelio
- Produced by: Ursula Budnik
- Starring: Manuela Martelli; Alicia Rodríguez; Diego Ruiz
- Cinematography: Benjamín Echazarreta
- Edited by: Sebastián Lelio; Soledad Salfate
- Music by: Cristóbal Carvajal
- Production companies: Horamágica; Divine Productions
- Release dates: 21 May 2009 (Cannes); 20 August 2009 (Chile); 4 November 2009 (France)
- Running time: 104 minutes
- Countries: Chile; France
- Language: Spanish

Christmas (Spanish: Navidad) is a 2009 Chilean-French drama film directed by Sebastián Lelio and written by Leilo & Gonzalo Maza. Starring Manuela Martelli, Diego Ruiz and Alicia Rodríguez.

== Synopsis ==
Alejandro and Aurora, a teenage couple, leave Santiago to spend Christmas at Aurora's family home at the foot of the Andes. However, Alejandro's frustrations and Aurora's doubts about her sexual identity create tensions that threaten to end their relationship. Things take an unexpected turn when they come across Alicia, a fragile 16-year-old who has run away from home. As they gather around an improvised Christmas tree, the couple becomes fascinated by the enigmatic Alicia, who gradually becomes the object of their desire. Despite the city's celebrations, the three orphans find solace in each other's company and embark on a unique and sentimental relationship that helps them overcome their loneliness.

== Cast ==
The actors participating in this film are:

- Manuela Martelli as Aurora.
- Diego Ruiz as Alejandro.
- Alicia Rodríguez as Alicia.

== Release ==
Christmas had its international premiere on 21 May 2009 at the 2009 Cannes International Film Festival as part of the Directors' Fortnight. Subsequently, the film was screened at the Viña del Mar International Film Festival where it won the Award for the Best Film Direction. It was commercially released on 20 August 2009 in Chilean theaters. It was released on 4 November 2009 in French theaters.
