= Almendras =

Almendras is a surname. Notable people with this surname include:

- Alejandro Almendras (1919–1995), Filipino politician
- Alejandro Fernández Almendras (born 1971), Chilean filmmaker
- Nico Almendras (born 1999), Filipino volleyball player
- Rene Almendras (born 1960), FIlipino businessman
