= Guillermo Calderón =

Chilean screenwriter

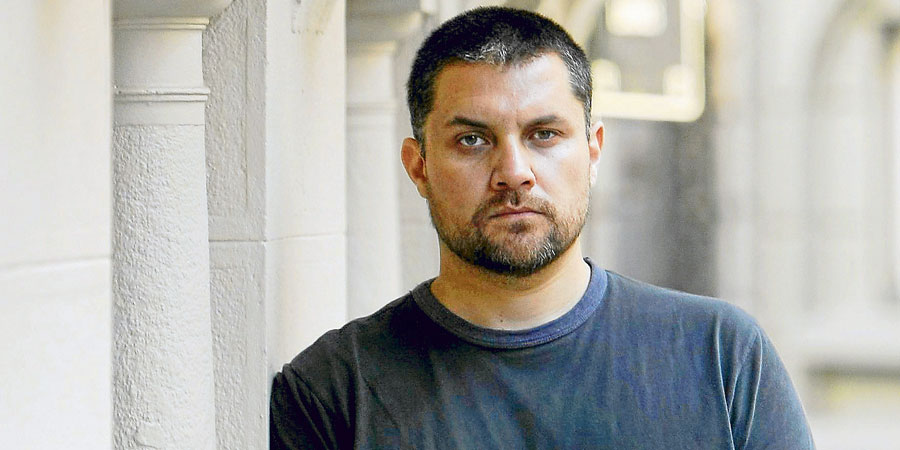
Guillermo Calderón

Guillermo Calderón is a Chilean playwright, director, and screenwriter. His plays have been produced at The Public Theater, Royal Court Theatre, and around the world. As a script writer, he has won different international awards for the best screenplay, such as the Golden Osella at the Venice Film Festival for The Count (2023), and the Platino Award for Neruda (2017).

== Biography ==
Calderón was born in Santiago, Chile in 1971. Growing up in Chile he studied acting at the Theater School of the University of Chile. Calderón also attended the Dell'Arte International School of Physical Theater in California, and receiving a master's degree in Film Theory at the Graduate Center of the City University of New York.

== Career ==
Calderón's plays include: B, Clase, Diciembre, Escuela, Gold Rush, Kiss, Mateluna, Neva, Quake, Speech, and Villa.

Calderón's screenplays include:

- Violeta Went to Heaven (2011), directed by Andrés Wood.
- El club (2015), directed by Pablo Larraín. This film was awarded with the Silver Bear Grand Jury Prize at the Berlinale.
- Neruda (2016), directed by Pablo Larraín. Calderón's work won the Platino Award for the Best Screenplay (2017). The motion picture was nominated for the Best Foreign Language Film at the Golden Globe Awards (2017).
- Ema (2019), directed by Pablo Larraín. The screenplay was co-written with Alejandro Moreno.
- Spider (2019), directed by Andrés Wood.
- Burning Patience (2022), directed by Rodrigo Sepúlveda.
- El Conde (2023), directed by Pablo Larraín. The screenplay, co-written by Calderón and Larraín, was the recipient of the Golden Osella at the Venice Film Festival.
