= La Verónica =

- Promotional release poster
- Directed by: Leonardo Medel
- Written by: Leonardo Medel
- Produced by: Alejandra Rosales
- Starring: Mariana Di Girolamo
- Cinematography: Pedro García
- Edited by: Daniel Ferreira
- Music by: Carlos Cabezas; Sol Aravena
- Production company: Merced
- Release dates: September 2020 (Zinemaldia); 5 August 2021 (Online)
- Running time: 100 minutes
- Country: Chile
- Language: Spanish

La Verónica (lit. 'The Verónica') is a 2020 Chilean drama film written and directed by Leonardo Medel. Starring Mariana Di Girolamo accompanied by Patricia Rivadeneira, Ariel Mateluna, Antonia Giesen, Willy Semler, Josefina Montané, Coco Páez and María Jesús Vidaurre. It was recorded in more than fifty sequence shots in which the protagonist is always in the foreground.

== Synopsis ==
Popular model Verónica Lara lives a seemingly happy life married to an international soccer star, but all this changes when she discovers that she is the main suspect in the murder of her daughter that occurred 10 years earlier. Under a lot of pressure, her marriage falls apart and she begins to feel jealous of Amanda, her newborn daughter.

== Cast ==
The actors participating in this film are:

- Mariana Di Girolamo as Verónica Lara
- Patricia Rivadeneira as Andrea
- Ariel Mateluna as Javier
- Antonia Giesen as Julieta
- Willy Semler as Fiscal
- Josefina Montané as Carolina
- Coco Páez as Moni
- Gloria Fernández as Amanda
- María Jesús Vidaurre as Roberta
- Gilda Maureira as Ester
- Sylvia Hernández as Verónica's Mother
- Renata Rojas as Laura
- Matias Cornejo as Manuel
- Vicente Toledo Mahmoud as Jaime
- Ignacia Jara as Ignacia
- Emilio Edwards as Biut Executive
- Benjamin Berger as Biut Manager
- Carolina Castillo as Campaign Producer
- Joaquín Yutronic as Verónica's Photographer
- Valentina Hites as Model 1
- Valeryia Alfirovich as Model 2
- Anastasia Tverdokhlebova as Model 3
- Ingrid Fiorini as Model 4
- Francisca Neumann as Party Guest
- Thiare Vega as Party Guest / Graveyard Attendee
- Javiera Lucero as Graveyard Attendee
- Stephan Cabezas as Graveyard Attendee

== Production ==
Principal photography began in October 2019 in Santiago, Chile amid social unrest in the capital.

== Release ==
La Verónica had its world premiere at the end of September 2020 at the 68th San Sebastián International Film Festival, then screened on September 9, 2020, at the 45th Toronto International Film Festival. It was commercially released on August 5, 2021, on the Alto Parlante streaming service. Later, it was screened on December 3, 2021, at the International Festival of New Latin American Cinema.

== Accolades ==
Year	Award / Festival	Category	Recipient	Result	Ref.
2020	San Sebastian International Film Festival	Latin Horizons Award	La Verónica	Nominated	
2020	Tallinn Black Nights Film Festival	Rebels with a Cause Award	La Verónica	Won (Tied with "Dinner in America")	
2021	Aswan International Women's Film Festival	Best Actress	Mariana di Girolamo	Won	
2021	North Bend Film Festival	Best Film	La Verónica	Won	
2021	North Bend Film Festival	Best Performance	Mariana di Girolamo	Won	
2021	Lima Film Festival	Best Film	La Verónica	Nominated	
2021	International Festival of New Latin American Cinema	Signis Award	La Verónica	Won	
2021	International Festival of New Latin American Cinema	FIPRESCI Award	La Verónica	Won	
2022	Caleuche Awards	Best Leading Actress	Mariana di Girolamo	Nominated	
