= Huacho (film) =

- Film poster
- Directed by: Alejandro Fernández Almendras
- Written by: Alejandro Fernández Almendras
- Cinematography: Inti Briones
- Music by: Los Jaivas
- Release date: 2009
- Running time: 89 minutes
- Countries: Chile, France, Germany
- Language: Spanish

Huacho is a 2009 Chilean art film directed by Alejandro Fernández Almendras in his debut feature. The film has its world premiere in Competition as part of Critics' Week at the 2009 Cannes Film Festival. Subsequently, it won Best Film at the Viña del Mar International Film Festival, and the First Coral Prize for Best Opera Prima at the Havana Film Festival.

== Plot ==
A day in the life of a typical rural family from central Chile. The grandmother sells cheese by the roadside, the grandfather works in the fields, the daughter is a cook at an inn, and the grandson attends school. In four separate sections, we follow their small struggles and joys throughout a day that candidly reveals a changing Chile that few are familiar with.

== Cast ==
- Manuel Hernández
- Alejandra Yáñez
- Clemira Aguayo
- Cornelio Villagrán
