= Manuela Martelli =

Chilean film and television actress

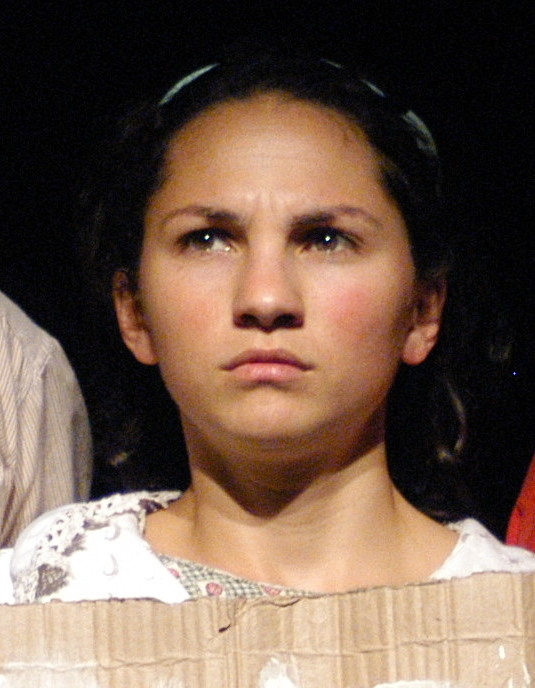
- Martelli in 2006
- Born: Manuela Abril Martelli Salamovich; April 16, 1983 (age 43); Santiago de Chile, Chile
- Education: Pontifical Catholic University of Chile
- Occupation: Actress

Manuela Abril Martelli Salamovich (born April 16, 1983) is a Chilean film and television actress and director best known for her roles in the films B-Happy and Machuca. She starred with the famous Dutch actor Rutger Hauer in the Chilean-Italian film Il Futuro, based on Roberto Bolaño's novel A Little Lumpen Novelita. As a film director, her feature debut 1976 was shown at the 2022 Cannes Film Festival at the Director's Fortnight section.

== Biography ==
On April 16, 1983, Martelli was born in Santiago de Chile. Martelli's parents are Nicolás Martelli, of Italian descent, and Marian Salamovich, of Croatian descent.

Martelli studied at Saint George's College, Santiago and at the Pontificia Universidad Católica de Chile. In 2010, she enrolled at Temple University in Philadelphia, where she graduated with a master's degree in film studies.

She started acting in her teenage years. Martelli played the main role in the film B-Happy by Gonzalo Justiniano. Later she had roles in the TV series Huaiquimán y Tolosa and movies like Machuca, Radio Corazón and Malta con Huevo. In 2010 she appeared in Canal 13's telenovela Feroz.

In 2014, she emerged as a director with a short film, Apnea. Her 2015 short Land Tides was a part of Factory Programme and premiered at the Cannes Director's Fortnight. In 2021, she filmed her feature debut 1976. It was screened at numerous festivals around the world and won multiple awards, among them the Sutherland Award for best first feature at the 2022 BFI London Film Festival, Best Debut Film Award at Jerusalem Film Festival, Best Actress Award at TIFF, Platino Award for Best Debut Film, etc.

In 2022, Martelli worked on a second feature, The Meltdown (El deshielo). It was presented at Ventana Sur’s 5th Proyecta co-production forum, and won the second Coprocity Development Prize. The Meltdown is the second part of the trilogy initiated with 1976.

== Filmography ==
=== As filmmaker ===
Year	English Title	Original Title	Notes
2021	Chile '76	1976	
2026	The Meltdown	El deshielo	

=== As actress ===
Year	Film	Role	Notes
2003	B-Happy	Katty	Main role.
2004	Machuca	Silvana	
2005	Monógamo Sucesivo		
2005	Como un Avión Estrellado	Luchi	
2005	Baño de mujeres	Soledad	
2007	Scrambled Beer	Fedora	
2007	¡Pega Martín Pega!		
2007	Radio Corazón	Nice	
2008	Sonetàula	Maddalena	Italian film
2008	La Buena Vida	Paula	
2009	The Bridge	Lucía	
2009	Christmas	Aurora	
2012	My Last Round	Jennifer	
2013	Il Futuro	Bianca	
2014	Two Shots Fired	Lucía	
2025	God Will Not Help	Teresa	

=== Telenovelas ===
Year	Telenovela	Role	Channel	Notes
2010	Feroz	Amanda Carrera	Canal 13	Debut in telenovelas.

=== TV series ===
Year	TV series	Role	Channel	Notes
2008	Huaiquimán y Tolosa	Sofía Santos	Canal 13	appeared in 11 chapters.
