= Ema (film) =

- film poster
- Directed by: Pablo Larraín
- Written by: Guillermo Calderón; Alejandro Moreno
- Produced by: Juan de Dios Larraín
- Starring: Mariana di Girolamo; Gael García Bernal; Paola Giannini; Santiago Cabrera; Cristián Suárez
- Cinematography: Sergio Armstrong
- Edited by: Sebastián Sepúlveda
- Music by: Nicolás Jaar
- Production company: Fábula
- Release dates: August 30, 2019 (Venice); September 26, 2019 (Chile)
- Running time: 102 minutes
- Country: Chile
- Language: Spanish
- Box office: $371,311

Ema is a 2019 Chilean drama film directed by Pablo Larraín from a screenplay written by Guillermo Calderón and Alejandro Moreno. The cast includes Gael García Bernal, Mariana di Girolamo, Paula Luchsinger, Cristián Suárez, Paola Giannini, and Santiago Cabrera. The film explores the adoption process from the parents' perspective, raising questions about the concept of family.

It premiered at the Venice Film Festival on August 30, 2019.

== Plot ==
Set in contemporary Valparaíso, the story follows Ema, a young dancer who, after divorcing Gastón, the director of the company she performs with, tries to rebuild her life. The couple had adopted Polo, a child to address Gastón’s sterility, but eventually returned him to the orphanage. A tragedy, caused by the child's pyromania, ensues.

== Cast ==
- Mariana di Girolamo as Ema
- Gael García Bernal as Gastón
- Paula Luchsinger as María
- Paola Giannini as Raquel
- Santiago Cabrera as Aníbal
- Cristián Suárez as Polo
- Giannina Fruttero
- Josefina Fiebelkorn
- Paula Hofmann
- Antonia Giesen
- Catalina Saavedra
- Mariana Loyola
- Susana Hidalgo
- Amparo Noguera
- Cristian Felipe Suarez as Polo
- Claudio Arredondo
- Claudia Cabezas
- Paula Zúñiga
- Diego Muñoz

== Production ==
In August 2018, it was announced Mariana di Girolamo, Gael García Bernal, Paola Giannini, Santiago Cabrera, Giannina Fruttero, Josefina Fiebelkorn, Paula Hofmann, Paula Luchsinger, Antonia Giesen, Catalina Saavedra, Mariana Loyola and Susana Hidalgo had joined the cast of the film, with Pablo Larraín directing from a screenplay by Guillermo Calderón and Alejandro Moreno. Juan de Dios Larraín will serve as producer on the film under his Fabula banner.

=== Filming ===
Principal photography began in August 2018.

== Release ==
It had its world premiere at the Venice Film Festival on August 31, 2019. It also screened at the Toronto International Film Festival on September 9, 2019. It was released in Chile on 26 September 2019. Shortly after, Mubi and Music Box Films acquired U.K. and U.S. distribution rights to the film. Mubi previously planned a theatrical release for the film, but it was cancelled due to the COVID-19 pandemic. Instead, the film was released through Mubi's video streaming service in the U.K, Ireland and India, from 2 May 2020.

Ema was released in Australian cinemas on May 13, 2021. It was released in the United States on 13 August 2021.

== Critical response ==
On Rotten Tomatoes, the film has an approval rating of 88% based on 141 reviews, with an average rating of 7.50/10. The consensus reads, "Beautifully filmed and powerfully acted, Ema puts a thoroughly distinctive spin on its story of emotional trauma and self-discovery." On Metacritic, the film has a weighted average score of 71 out of 100, based on reviews from 25 critics, indicating "generally favorable reviews".
