= A Little Lumpen Novelita =

2002 novel by Roberto Bolaño

- First edition (Spanish)
- Author: Roberto Bolaño
- Original title: Una Novelita Lumpen
- Translator: Natasha Wimmer
- Language: Spanish
- Publisher: Mondadori (Spanish); New Directions (English)
- Publication date: 2002
- Publication place: Spain
- English publication date: 2014
- Media type: Print
- Pages: 128
- ISBN: 0811223353

A Little Lumpen Novelita (Una novelita lumpen in Spanish) is a 2002 coming-of-age novel by the Chilean author Roberto Bolaño. In September 2014, New Directions published an English-language translated by Natasha Wimmer. The book is divided into sixteen short chapters, told in first person by the protagonist Bianca, who recalls her childhood, adolescence and early adulthood.

Il Futuro, a 2013 film directed by Alicia Scherson and starring Manuela Martelli and Rutger Hauer, was based on this novel.

== Reception ==
In a starred review, Publishers Weekly's Gabe Habash referred to A Little Lumpen Novelita as "a glittering gem, as maddening and haunting as you'd expect from Bolaño", noting that "even though [it] is not Bolaño's best book, it's still one of the best books of the year." Habash highlights how the book, which is "slightly longer than a chapbook [...,] feels as substantial as a book three times as long, because Bolaño keeps his scope small and frantically explores all the little crawl spaces of the story". Alongside a linear plot, the novel "bends and twists, refusing to be pinned down", which Habash describes as "the book's real draw".

Kirkus Reviews called A Little Lumpen Novelita "a concise but welcome addition to a major writer's canon", highlighting how "its watertight prose (via Wimmer's translation) and themes of criminality and the treatment of women make it of a piece with the writer's grander works".

Booklist also reviewed the novel.
