= To Kill a Man =

- Promotional release poster
- Matar a un hombre
- Directed by: Alejandro Fernández Almendras
- Written by: Alejandro Fernández Almendras
- Produced by: Guillaume de Seille; Eduardo Villalobos
- Starring: Daniel Antivilo; Daniel Candia; Ariel Mateluna; Alejandra Yáñez
- Cinematography: Inti Briones
- Edited by: Alejandro Fernández Almendras; Soledad Salfate
- Music by: Pablo Vergara
- Production company: El Remanso
- Distributed by: Film Movement
- Release date: January 17, 2014 (Sundance Film Festival)
- Running time: 82 minutes
- Countries: Chile; France
- Language: Spanish

To Kill a Man (Spanish: Matar a un hombre) is a 2014 Chilean-French drama film written and directed by Alejandro Fernández Almendras. The film premiered in-competition in the World Cinema Dramatic Competition at 2014 Sundance Film Festival on January 17, 2014. It won the Grand Jury Prize at the festival.

On January 29, it premiered at 2014 International Film Festival Rotterdam and won the KNF Award. The film later screened at the 2014 Miami International Film Festival in The Knight Competition on March 10, 2014. It won the Critics Award at the festival. It also premiered in competition at 2014 Fribourg International Film Festival on March 30, 2014 and won the Special Jury Prize.

After its premiere at the Sundance Film Festival, Film Movement acquired the distribution rights of the film. The movie was theatrically released in the United States and Canada in fall 2014, followed with a VOD and DVD release.

The film was selected as the Chilean entry for the Best Foreign Language Film at the 87th Academy Awards, but was not nominated.

== Plot ==
Jorge, a hard-working and impoverished man, and his family live in terror due to the harassment from the criminal gang of Kalule. When Jorge's teenage son courageously attempts to defend his father, Kalule responds by shooting him. Despite their efforts to seek justice through the legal system, Jorge and his wife Martha are unsuccessful. To make matters worse, Kalule is released from prison after serving only a two-year sentence. Determined to protect his family, Jorge prepares to take matters into his own hands.

== Cast ==
- Daniel Antivilo as Kalule
- Daniel Candia as Jorge
- Ariel Mateluna as Jorgito
- Alejandra Yáñez as Marta

== Reception ==
To Kill a Man received mostly positive reviews upon its premiere at the 2014 Sundance Film Festival. Variety reviewer Guy Lodge, called “To Kill a Man,” a grim, fat-free revenge thriller that extracts an impressive degree of moral equivocation from its exceedingly simple premise."

John DeFore in his review for The Hollywood Reporter called the film "A quiet drama that cares as much about familial alienation as getting away with murder."

Carlos Aguilar of IndieWire grade the film B+ by saying that "Chilean director Alejandro Fernández Almendras' third feature "To Kill a Man" is a quietly powerful character study that meditates on the ramifications of a family man's choice to defend his kind."

Lorri Vodi Rupard from The GATE praised the film by saying that "The tonality of To Kill A Man is that of stark desperation, the subject matter weighty. Still, woven throughout Alejandro’s undertaking there’s tangible humor and pathos as if one is watching an unanimated rip-off of WB’s Roadrunner where Wile E. Coyote has found Jesus and is less emaciated after all these years but still can’t get his man."

Chris Michael of The Guardian gave the film four out of five stars by saying that "This meticulous film squeezes Jorge ever tighter in its grip as his contemptuous wife, his vulnerable daughter and, you feel, his own pride demand that he stand up for his family when the authorities can't kiss it better. A terrifically tense first half culminates in a truly brilliant scene featuring a car alarm used as a lure. The pace subsequently sags, but it all ends with a dramatic pop as sharp as the first of only two gunshots in this menacing, morally agnostic film."

== Accolades ==
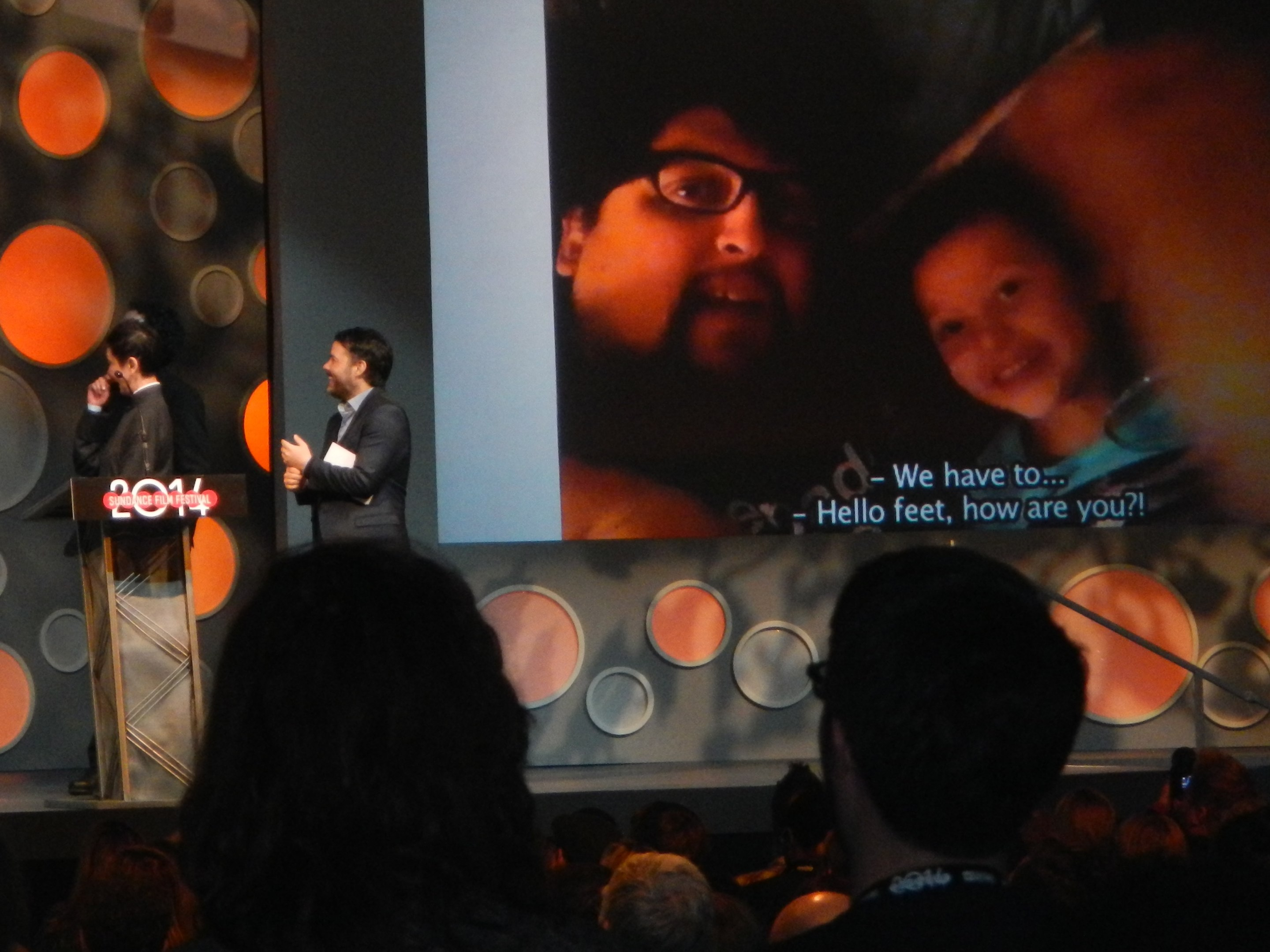
It won the Grand Jury Prize at the 2014 Sundance Film Festival.

Year	Award	Category	Recipient	Result
2014	Sundance Film Festival	World Cinema Grand Jury Prize: Dramatic	Alejandro Fernández Almendras	Won
2014	International Film Festival Rotterdam	Big Screen Award	Alejandro Fernández Almendras	Nominated
2014	International Film Festival Rotterdam	KNF Award	Alejandro Fernández Almendras	Won
2014	Miami International Film Festival	Grand Jury Prize - Knight Competition	Alejandro Fernández Almendras	Nominated
2014	Miami International Film Festival	Miami Future Cinema Critics Award	Alejandro Fernández Almendras	Won
2014	Fribourg International Film Festival	Grand Prix	Alejandro Fernández Almendras	Nominated
2014	Fribourg International Film Festival	Special Jury Prize	Alejandro Fernández Almendras	Won

== See also ==
- Conspiracy To Kill a Man
- List of films featuring diabetes
- List of submissions to the 87th Academy Awards for Best Foreign Language Film
- List of Chilean submissions for the Academy Award for Best Foreign Language Film

Awards
Preceded by Jiseul	Sundance Grand Jury Prize: World Cinema Dramatic; 2014	Succeeded by Slow West
