= Burning Patience =

Ardiente paciencia
- Netflix Release Poster
- Directed by: Rodrigo Sepúlveda
- Written by: Guillermo Calderón
- Produced by: Cristian Donoso; Rocío Jadue; Juan de Dios Larraín; Pablo Larraín; Alejandro Wise
- Starring: Andrew Bargsted; Vivianne Dietz
- Cinematography: Maura Morales Bergmann
- Edited by: Ana Godoy
- Music by: Carlos Cabezas
- Production companies: Fábula; Netflix
- Distributed by: Netflix
- Release date: December 7, 2022
- Running time: 90 minutes
- Country: Chile
- Language: Spanish

Burning Patience (Spanish: Ardiente paciencia) is a 2022 Chilean romantic drama film directed by Rodrigo Sepúlveda and written by Guillermo Calderón. It is based on the novel Ardiente paciencia (The Postman) by Antonio Skármeta. It stars Vivianne Dietz and Andrew Bargsted. It is the first Netflix film produced in Chile.

== Synopsis ==
Set in 1969, it tells the story of Mario, a young fisherman who dreams of being a poet. Determined to fulfill his goal, he becomes the postman of the famous writer Pablo Neruda. In this way, nurtured by his mentor, he will fight to become a writer and conquer Beatriz, his great love.

== Cast ==
The actors participating in this film are:

- Andrew Bargsted as Mario
- Vivianne Dietz as Beatriz
- Claudio Arredondo as Pablo Neruda
- Paola Giannini as Elba
- Amalia Kassai as Clarita
- Rodolfo Pulgar as Cosme
- Pablo Mecaya as Jorge
- Trinidad Gonzáles as Elvira
- Giordano Rossi as Julio

== Production ==
On November 7, 2021, Netflix announced that it would produce, together with Fabula, a film based on the novel by Antonio Skármeta Ardiente paciencia. Filming began April 4, 2022 in the town of Isla Negra, on the coast of Chile.

== Release ==
Burning Patience premiered in November 2022 in Mar del Plata, Argentina as part of the Galas section at the Mar del Plata International Film Festival. The film released internationally on December 7, 2022 on Netflix.
