= Al sur del corazón =

- Genre: Telenovela
- Created by: Daniella Castagno
- Written by: José Fonseca; Elena Muñoz; Alejandro Bruna
- Directed by: Patricio González
- Starring: Francisco Melo; Paola Volpato; Mario Horton; Mariana di Girolamo; Gabriela Hernández
- Opening theme: "Necesito un segundo" by Chayanne
- Country of origin: Chile
- Original language: Spanish
- No. of seasons: 1
- No. of episodes: 154

Production
- Executive producer: Daniela Demicheli
- Camera setup: Multi-camera

Original release
- Network: Mega
- Release: April 9 – November 25, 2024

Al sur del corazón is a Chilean telenovela created by Daniella Castagno. It aired on Mega from April 9, 2024 to November 25, 2024. It stars Francisco Melo and Paola Volpato.

== Cast ==
- Francisco Melo as Manuel Toro Quiroz
- Paola Volpato as Emilia Bravo Bravo
- Mario Horton as Felipe Toro Mella
- Mariana di Girolamo as Gracia Pinto Bravo
- Gabriela Hernández as Hilda Bravo Suchert
- Gastón Salgado as Pablo Gallardo Álvarez
- Francisca Armstrong as Milagros Pinto Bravo
- Claudio Arredondo as Juan "Juancho" Álvarez
- Carmen Disa Gutiérrez as Tránsito Cafuleo
- Catalina Guerra as Rita Krauss
- Francisca Gavilán as Mercedes Sagredo
- Francisco Ossa as Francisco Pinto
- Daniel Muñoz as Ernesto Calufeo
- Pedro Campos as Rodrigo Arancibia
- Victoria De Gregorio as Valentina García-Huidobro
- Constanza Araya as Judith Fuenzalida
- Simón Beltrán as Óscar "Oscarito" Álvarez Sagredo
- Clara Silvera as Trinidad Pinto Bravo / Trinidad Toro Bravo

== Production ==
In November 2023, it was announced that Mega had begun pre-production on Al sur del corazón. Filming began on January 3, 2024.

== Reception ==
=== Ratings ===
Season	Episodes	First aired		Last aired	
Season	Episodes	Date	Rating (in points)	Date	Rating (in points)
1	154	April 9, 2024	19.1	November 25, 2024	16.5

=== Awards and nominations ===
Year	Award	Category	Nominated	Result	Ref
2024	Produ Awards	Best Telenovela	Al sur del corazón	Nominated	
2024	Produ Awards	Best Lead Actress - Short Telenovela	Paola Volpato	Nominated	
2024	Produ Awards	Best Supporting Actress - Short Telenovela	Mariana di Girolamo	Won	
2024	Produ Awards	Best Supporting Actor - Short Telenovela	Mario Horton	Nominated	
2024	Produ Awards	Best Directing - Superseries or Telenovela	Patricio González	Nominated	
2024	Produ Awards	Best Producer - Superseries or Telenovela	María Eugenia Rencoret, Daniela Demicheli & Pablo Ávila	Nominated	
2024	Produ Awards	Best Screenplay - Superseries or Telenovela	Daniella Castagno, Elena Muñoz, José Fonseca & Alejandro Brun	Nominated	
