= Perdona nuestros pecados =

- Genre: Telenovela
- Created by: Pablo Illanes
- Written by: Josefina Fernández
- Directed by: Nicolás Alemparte; María Eugenia Rencoret
- Starring: See list
- Country of origin: Chile
- Original language: Spanish
- No. of seasons: 2
- No. of episodes: 312

Production
- Executive producer: Daniela Demicheli
- Producer: Bruno Córdova
- Camera setup: Multi-camera
- Production company: Megavisión

Original release
- Network: Mega
- Release: March 6, 2017 – August 22, 2018

Perdona nuestros pecados (Spanish for Forgive our sins) is a Chilean drama telenovela that premiered on Mega on March 6, 2017. The series is created by Pablo Illanes and written by Josefina Fernández. It stars Mariana Di Girolamo, Mario Horton, Álvaro Rudolphy and Paola Volpato as main characters.

== Series overview ==
| Season | Episodes | Originally released | |
| Season | Episodes | First released | Last released |
|---|---|---|---|
| 1 | 232 | March 6, 2017 | April 11, 2018 |
| 2 | 80 | April 16, 2018 | August 22, 2018 |

== Cast ==
=== Main characters ===
- Álvaro Rudolphy as Armando Quiroga
- Paola Volpato as Ángela Bulnes
- Mario Horton as Father Reynaldo Suárez
- Mariana Di Girolamo as María Elsa Quiroga de Moller
- Patricia Rivadeneira as Estela Undurraga de Quiroga
- Andrés Velasco as Lamberto Montero
- Francisca Gavilán as Silvia Corcuera
- Fernanda Ramírez as Augusta Montero de Moller
- Etienne Bobenrieth as Camilo Corcuera
- Carmen Disa Gutiérrez as Lidia Ilic
- Ximena Rivas as Guillermina Márquez
- César Caillet as Ernesto Möller
- Nicolás Oyarzún as Gerardo Montero
- Constanza Araya as Antonieta Corcuera
- Mabel Farías as Fresia Toro
- José Antonio Raffo as Carlos Möller
- Gabriel Cañas as Horacio Möller
- Alejandra Araya as María Isabel Quiroga
- María Soledad Cruz as María Mercedes Möller
- Romina Norambuena as Ingrid Ormeño
- Félix Villar as Renzo Moreno
- Francisco Godoy as Martín Quiroga
- Catalina Benítez as Sofía Quiroga
- Andrés Commentz as Domingo Quiroga

=== Recurring characters ===
- Katyna Huberman as Elvira Undurraga
- Héctor Noguera as Obispo Remigio Subercaseaux
- Consuelo Holzapfel as Clemencia Valdeavellano
- Alejandro Goic as Iván Carrasco
- Lorena Capetillo as Nora del Solar
- María José Bello as Bárbara Román de Pereira
- Christián Zuñiga as Lautaro Fuenzalida
- Roxana Naranjo as Rocío Paillán
- Víctor Montero as Manuel Cid
- Hugo Vásquez as Doctor Leonidas Concha
- Gonzalo Muñoz Lerner as Luis Sánchez
- Margarita Llanos as Georgina López
- Elizabeth Torres as Zenaida Urraz
- Cristián Carvajal as Nicanor Pereira
- Claudio Arredondo as Father Esteban Madrid

== Ratings ==
| Season | Episodes | First aired | | Last aired | |
| Season | Episodes | Date | Rating | Date | Rating |
|---|---|---|---|---|---|
| 1 | 232 | March 6, 2017 | 29.8 | April 11, 2018 | 32.1 |
| 2 | 80 | April 16, 2018 | 33.8 | August 22, 2018 | 35.6 |
