= Machuca =

2004 film

- Chilean theatrical release poster
- Directed by: Andrés Wood
- Written by: Roberto Brodsky; Mamoun Hassan; Andrés Wood; Eliseo Altunaga (consultant)
- Produced by: Andrés Wood; Mamoun Hassan; Gerardo Herrero
- Starring: Matías Quer; Ariel Mateluna; Manuela Martelli; Aline Küppenheim; Federico Luppi
- Cinematography: Miguel Ioann Littin Menz
- Edited by: Fernando Pardo; Soledad Salfate
- Music by: Miguel Miranda; José Miguel Tobar
- Production companies: Andrés Wood Producciones; Tornasol Films; Chile Films; Mamoun Hassan; Paraíso
- Distributed by: Menemsha Entertainment
- Release dates: 21 May 2004 (Cannes); 11 June 2004 (Spain); 5 August 2004 (Chile)
- Running time: 121 minutes
- Countries: Chile; Spain; United Kingdom; France
- Language: Spanish
- Budget: $1.7 million
- Box office: $3,187,700 (worldwide)

Machuca is a 2004 internationally co-produced coming-of-age political drama film co-written and directed by Andrés Wood. It stars Matías Quer, Ariel Mateluna, Manuela Martelli, and Aline Küppenheim alongside Federico Luppi.

Set in Santiago during the months leading up to the 1973 coup d'état led by General Augusto Pinochet – which overthrew Salvador Allende's socialist government – the film tells the story of two boys who attend an elite Catholic school: Gonzalo Infante – who belongs to a wealthy family with a European background – and Pedro Machuca – who is poor and comes from an indigenous background.

The film is inspired by and dedicated to Father Gerardo Whelan, C.S.C. who from 1969 to 1973 was the director of Saint George's College, the private school depicted in the film, which the director himself attended as a boy. Machuca was filmed in July 2003 and produced on a moderate budget of US$1,700,000. It is a joint Chilean-Spanish-British-French international co-production with support from Ibermedia. Production companies included Andrés Wood Producciones, Tornasol Films, Mamoun Hassan, Paraíso, and Chile Films.

The film premiered in the Directors' Fortnight parallel section of the 57th Cannes Film Festival in May 2004. The film became one of the highest-grossing domestic ever in Chile, and went on grossing more than $3 million in worldwide box office.

== Plot ==
The story is told from the viewpoint of Gonzalo Infante, a 12-year-old upper-class boy, and is set in a turbulent time in Chile. The working class was demanding social justice and significant changes to the country's socioeconomic structure after electing a socialist president. In this context, the wealthy classes became afraid of the socialist movement, and some of its most prominent members conspired against the government of Salvador Allende.

While Gonzalo's father is sympathetic to the less fortunate and not part of the right-wing movement, he wants to take his family to Italy, where he often travels for his work at the UN FAO. Gonzalo's mother, on the other hand, is resigned to the state of affairs and is having an affair with a wealthy and much older Argentinean.

Gonzalo attends a private school where the determined school principal, Father McEnroe, has initiated a social integration project. However, some of the parents consider it a "leftist venture" instead of a Christian, charitable effort. When five disadvantaged students are admitted to Gonzalo's class, he befriends Pedro because he sympathizes with him after some wealthy classmates bully him.

Gonzalo joins Pedro and his neighbor Silvana in selling flags and cigarettes during street demonstrations. They first sell nationalist flags at a right-wing protest and later socialist flags at a leftist rally supporting the government. Silvana initially calls Gonzalo a snob and "strawberry-face," but eventually, they develop affection for each other and even share a kiss.

Pedro visits Gonzalo's home and is amazed by the fact that Gonzalo has a room to himself, filled with toys and a closet full of clothes. However, he also witnesses the tension and cruelty that exists within Gonzalo's family. When Gonzalo visits Pedro's shantytown dwelling, he is horrified by the extremely poor living conditions. Their friendship mirrors that of the Lone Ranger and Native American Tonto from Gonzalo's favorite comic book series. Gonzalo realizes that their friendship is against all odds when Silvana discovers them reading an issue of the magazine and comments on the implausibility of a white person being friends with an Indian.

As the political unrest in Chile escalates, the boys' friendship is put to the test. Pedro's alcoholic father ridicules him, telling him that while his supposed friend will grow up to be wealthy, he will be stuck in the lower class, likely cleaning toilets for the rich. The affluent parents of the students at St. Patrick's school have differing views on Father McEnroe's project. While some support the new policies, including Gonzalo's father, many others, including Gonzalo's mother, believe that for the good of the country, social classes should not be mixed.

The school's vegetable garden, which the students take care of, turns out to be a failure, jeopardizing the funding for Father McEnroe's project. During an anti-Communist protest, Gonzalo's sister's boyfriend takes Silvana's merchandise when the latter is being threatened by other protesters. Silvana retaliates by spitting on the windshield of the car Gonzalo's mother is riding in and calling her a whore. This increases tension between Gonzalo and Pedro, leading to a fight and the end of their friendship.

Following the coup, Father McEnroe is removed from the school by the military and is not even allowed to perform mass at the chapel. When he attends the first mass performed by a new priest, he receives communion but does not swallow the sacramental bread to preserve it from desecration and declares the place profane. Pedro leads the other students in honoring the priest as he leaves, resulting in his expulsion from the school.

Gonzalo visits the shantytown where Pedro and Silvana live, but upon arrival, he witnesses soldiers raiding the area and a tragic incident unfolds, resulting in Silvana being shot and killed. Gonzalo finds himself dragged into the chaos and struggles to convince a soldier that he does not belong there until he shows them his nice clothing and fair complexion. Eventually, the soldier lets him go, warning him never to return.

Heartbroken over the events he witnessed and the loss of his friend, Gonzalo returns to his family's new home. Their wealth has increased thanks to his mother's lover and the new government's redistribution of wealth. However, Gonzalo is left devastated, recalling the last time he saw Pedro while staring at the ruins of the shantytown.

== Cast ==
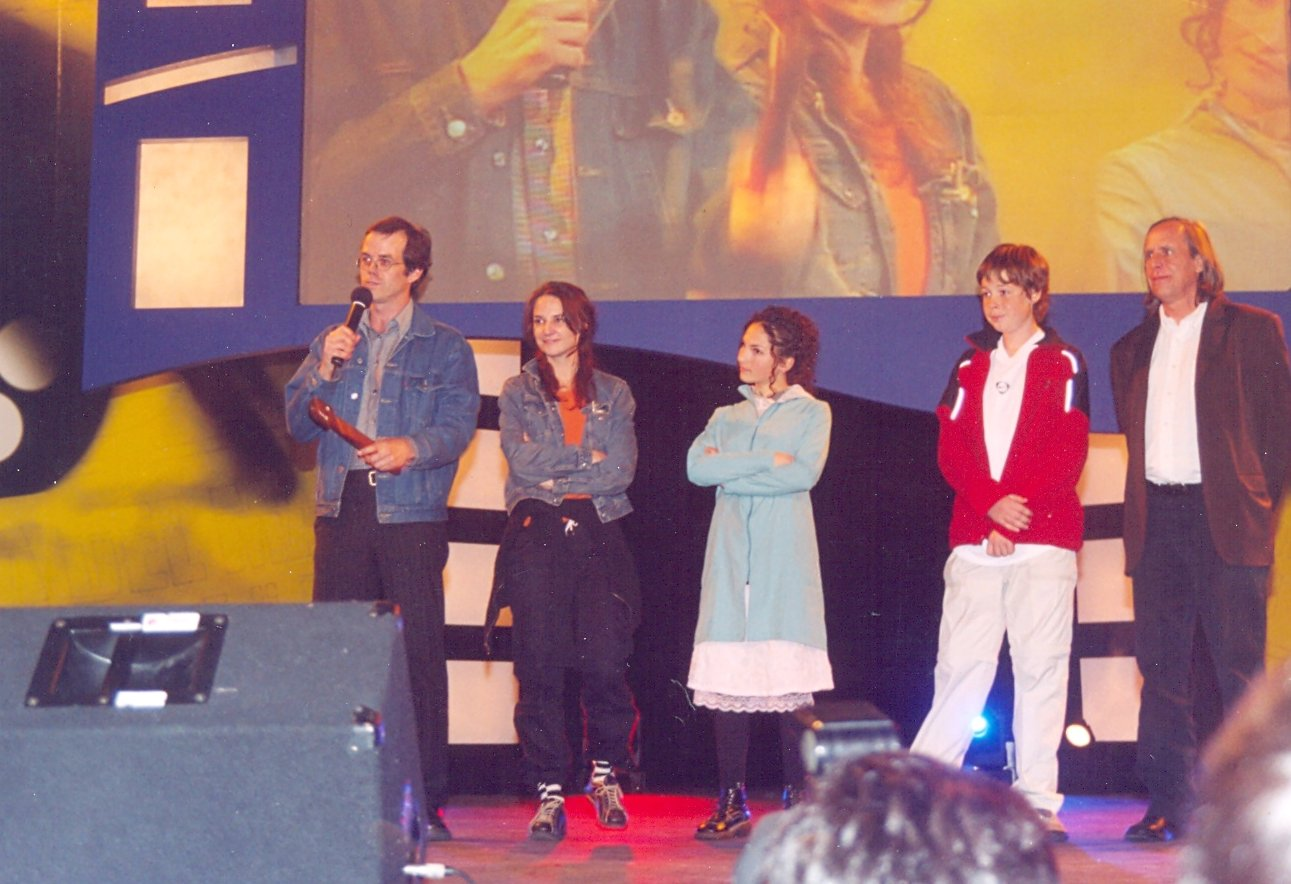
Andrés Wood, Aline Kuppenheim, Manuela Martelli and Matías Quer at the Viña del Mar International Film Festival 2004

- Matías Quer as Gonzalo Infante
- Ariel Mateluna as Pedro Machuca
- Manuela Martelli as Silvana
- Ernesto Malbran as Father McEnroe
- Aline Küppenheim as María Luisa Infante, Gonzalo's mother
- Francisco Reyes as Patricio Infante, Gonzalo's father
- Federico Luppi as Roberto Ochagavía, María Luisa Infante's lover
- Luis Dubó as Ismael Machuca, Pedro's father
- Tamara Acosta as Juana María, Pedro's mother
- Alejandro Trejo as Guillermo "Willy", Silvana's father
- Andrea García-Huidobro as Isabel Infante, Gonzalo's sister
- Tiago Correa as Pablo, Isabel's boyfriend
- Gabriela Medina as Lucy
- María Olga Matte as Miss Gilda
- Pablo Krögh as Coronel Sotomayor
- Aldo Parodi as Vendedor de Ropa
- Hugo Vásquez Stom as Apoderado #1
- Alejandro Goic as Apoderado #2
- Francisca Imboden as María Ignacia
- Carolina Sotomayor as Josefina

== Reception ==
On the review aggregator website Rotten Tomatoes, 87% of 38 critics' reviews are positive, with an average rating of 7.5/10. Metacritic, which uses a weighted average, assigned the film a score of 76 out of 100, based on 19 critics, indicating "generally favorable" reviews.

Ann Hornaday of The Washington Post deemed the film to be "that rare film that merges the personal and political without sacrificing restraint or intellectual honesty".

Mike Goodridge of ScreenDaily described the film as a "small, artfully crafted movie", otherwise deeming it to be an "unsettling piece" which [unlike other films with similar themes] "doesn't fall into easy traps of sentimentalism".

== Accolades ==
Year	Award	Category	Nominee(s)	Result	Ref.
2004	Vancouver International Film Festival	Most Popular International Film		Won	
2004	Film Fest Gent	Georges Delerue Award for Best Soundtrack/Sound Design		Won	
2005	19th Goya Awards	Best Spanish-Language Foreign Film		Nominated	
2005	47th Ariel Awards	Best Ibero-American Film		Nominated	

== See also ==
- Cinema of Chile
- List of Spanish films of 2004
