= Mariana di Girolamo =

Chilean actress (born 1990)

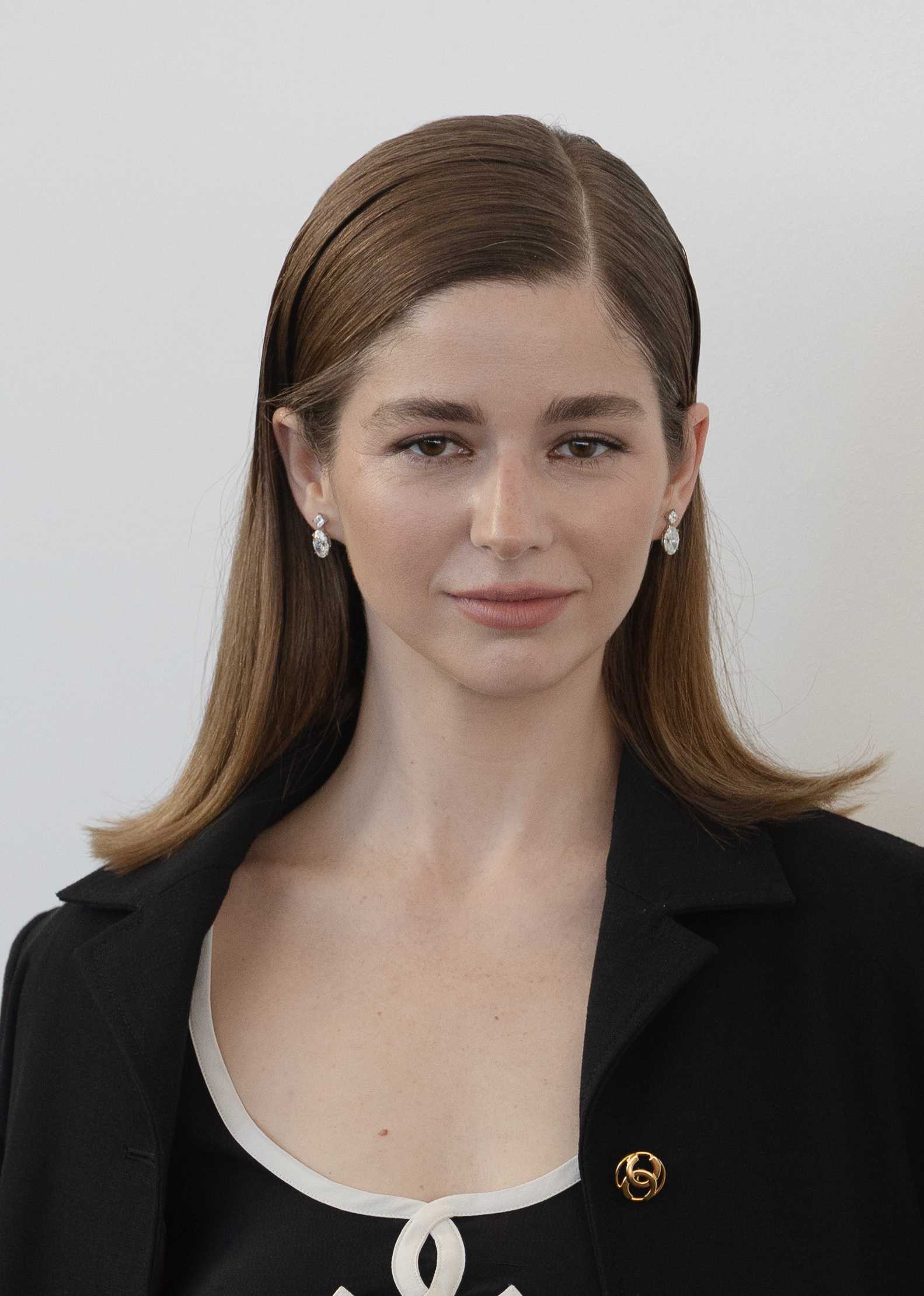
- di Girolamo in 2026
- Born: Mariana di Girolamo Arteaga; 22 October 1990 (age 36); Santiago, Chile
- Occupation: Actress
- Years active: 2013–present

Mariana di Girolamo Arteaga (born 22 October 1990) is a Chilean film and television actress. Di Girolamo had several major roles including her performance as Ema in the 2019 film Ema and La Verónica, in addition to television roles such as Perdona nuestros pecados. She also appeared in the Martin McDonagh film Wild Horse Nine.

== Early life and education ==
Di Girolamo is the niece of Chilean actress Claudia di Girolamo and granddaughter of Italian-Chilean artist Claudio di Girolamo.

Di Girolamo initially studied obstetrics at the University of Chile but left after a year and a half after deciding to pursue acting. While studying, she took a theatre workshop in which she performed Juan Radrigán's play Las Grutas, an experience she later said "made me feel alive" and convinced her to enroll at the Theatre School of the Pontifical Catholic University of Chile.

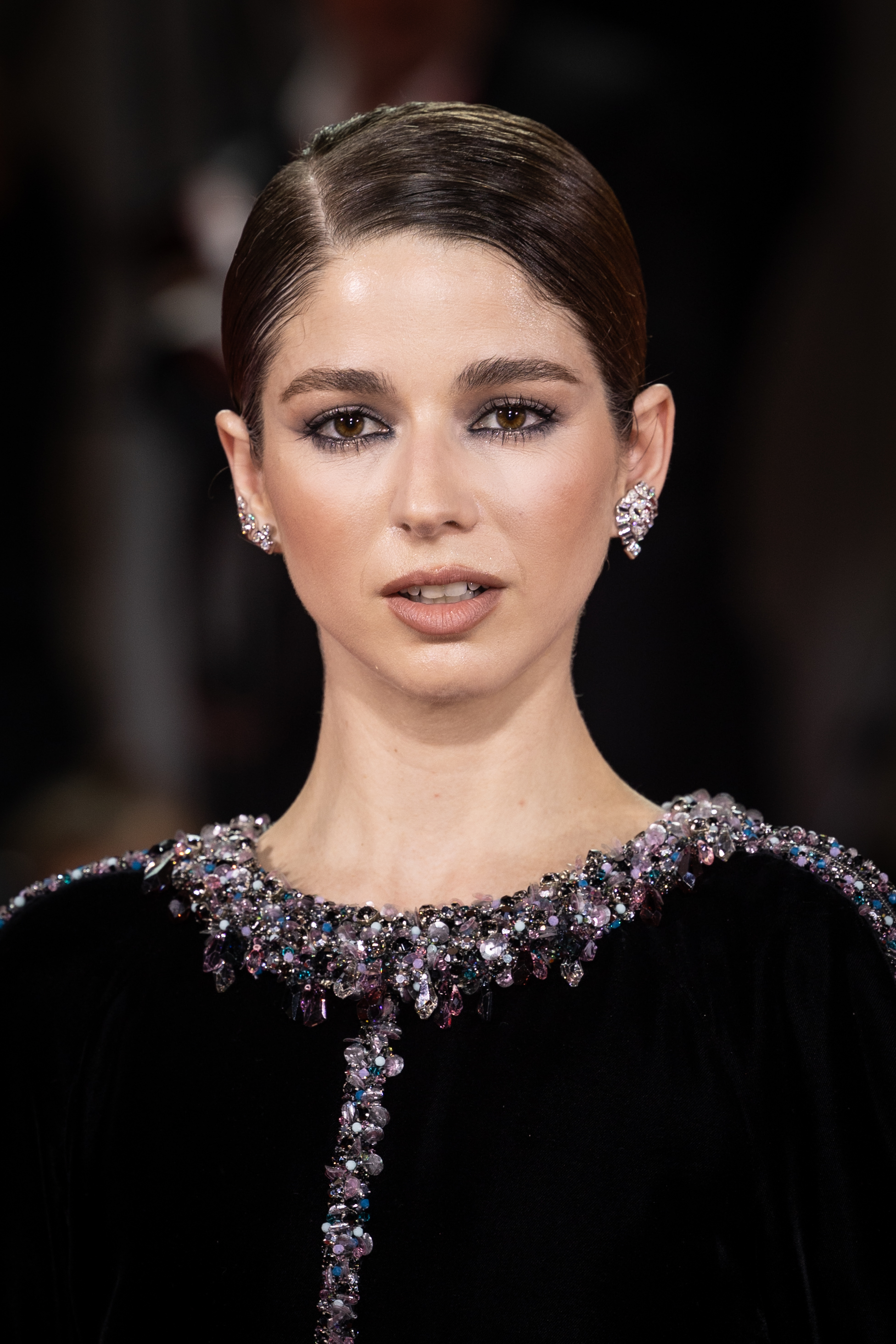
Girolamo in 2024

== Career ==
While filming Perdona nuestros pecados, di Girolamo was approached by director Pablo Larraín, who cast her in the lead role of Ema after discovering her through a newspaper photograph. She was cast without an audition following an in-person meeting, marking her breakthrough leading role in international cinema.

In March 2025, di Girolamo joined the ensemble cast of Martin McDonagh's dark comedy film Wild Horse Nine, produced by Searchlight Pictures, alongside Sam Rockwell, John Malkovich, Parker Posey, Steve Buscemi, Tom Waits, Ailín Salas and Paola Giannini.

== Filmography ==
=== Film ===
| Year | Title | Role | Notes |
|---|---|---|---|
| 2016 | Constitución | Clara | Short film |
| 2016 | Much Ado About Nothing | María | |
| 2018 | Hotel Zentai | | |
| 2019 | No Quiero Ser Tu Hermano | Emilia Buenaventura | |
| 2019 | Ema | Ema | |
| 2020 | La Verónica | Verónica Lara | |
| 2023 | Electrophilia | Ada | |
| 2023 | Alien0089 | Sabina | Short film |
| 2024 | Kill the Jockey | Ana Di Girolamo | |
| 2026 | Wild Horse Nine | Monica | |

=== Television ===
| Year | Title | Role | Notes |
|---|---|---|---|
| 2014–2015 | Pituca sin luca$ | María Belén Risopatrón | 147 episodes |
| 2016 | Pobre Gallo | Andrea González | 138 episodes |
| 2017–2018 | Perdona nuestros pecados | María Elsa Quiroga | 290 episodes |
| 2018 | Tiempos Mozos | Carla | Episode: "..." |
| 2018 | Harem | | |
| 2019 | Río Oscuro | Rosario Correa | 41 episodes |
| 2019–2022 | The Pack | Sofía | 16 episodes |
| 2021–2022 | Los Prisioneros | Patricia Rivadeneira | Miniseries |
| 2023 | The Kingdom | Yaelí | Miniseries; 6 episodes |
| 2024 | Victory or Death | Cecilia | Miniseries; 8 episodes |
| 2024 | Al Sur del Corazón | | 151 episodes |
| 2024–2025 | Los Casablanca | | 155 episodes |
| 2025 | No One Saw Us Leave | Raquel | 2 episodes |
