= My Brothers Dream Awake =

- Theatrical release poster
- Directed by: Claudia Huaiquimilla
- Written by: Claudia Huaiquimilla; Pablo Greene
- Produced by: Pablo Greene; Mariana Tejos Martignoni
- Starring: Iván Cáceres; César Herrera
- Cinematography: Mauro Veloso
- Edited by: Andrea Chignoli; María José Salazar
- Music by: Miguel Miranda; Miranda y Tobar
- Production companies: Inefable; Lanza Verde
- Distributed by: Market Chile
- Release dates: August 7, 2021 (Locarno); October 21, 2021 (Chile)
- Running time: 85 minutes
- Country: Chile
- Language: Spanish

My Brothers Dream Awake (Spanish: Mis hermanos sueñan despiertos) is a 2021 Chilean drama film directed by Claudia Huaiquimilla and written by Huaiquimilla & Pablo Greene. Starring Iván Cáceres and César Herrera accompanied by Paulina García, Andrew Bargsted, Julia Lübbert and Sebastián Ayala. It is about the life of 2 brothers in a juvenile prison who are looking for a way out of the place after spending a year inside.

The film received many accolades and nominations around the world, including Best Actor for Iván Cáceres, Best Screenplay and Best Ibero-American Fiction Film at the 36th Guadalajara International Film Festival; Coup de Cœur Award and the Audience Award at the 34th Toulouse Latin Film Festival; competed for the Gold Hugo in the New Directors Competition at the 57th Chicago International Film Festival and received a nomination for Best Ibero-American Film at the 64th Ariel Awards.

== Synopsis ==
After spending a year in a juvenile prison, the brothers Ángel and Franco, accompanied by a group of young people, decide to stage a riot with the aim of escaping and making their dreams come true.

== Cast ==
The actors participating in this film are:

- Iván Cáceres as Ángel.
- César Herrera as Franco
- Paulina García as Professor Ana
- Andrew Bargsted as Jaime
- Sebastián Ayala as Johnatan
- Julia Lübbert as Tiare
- Belén Herrera as Bianca
- René Miranda as Michael
- Joaquín Huenufil as Bryan
- Diego Arboleda as Parse
- Luz Jiménez as Grandma
- Robinson Aravena as Grandpa
- Mario Ocampo as Monitor
- Germán Díaz as Bastián
- Ariel Mateluna as Bad Influence
- Claudio Arredondo as Attorney
- Otilio Castro as Gendarme
- Víctor Recabarren as Víctor
- Francisco Sepúlveda as Francisco
- Ángel Pérez as Angelo
- Alejandro Neira as Alejandro
- Jorge Chambergo as Jorge
- Martín Maldonado as Maldonado
- Daniel Huaiquimilla as Arrested Man 1
- Jonathan Saldías as Arrested Man 2

== Production ==
Pre-production began on October 19–20, 2019, coinciding with the social outbreak in Chile. Principal photography began in December 2019.

== Release ==
My Brothers Dream Awake had its world premiere on August 7, 2021, at the 74th Locarno Film Festival. It was commercially released on October 21, 2021, in Chilean theaters.

== Accolades ==
Year	Award / Festival	Category	Recipient	Result	Ref.
2021	Locarno Film Festival	Golden Leopard	My Brothers Dream Awake	Nominated	
2021	Valdivia International Film Festival	Best Film	My Brothers Dream Awake	Won	
2021	Valdivia International Film Festival	Héctor Ríos Award for Best Cinematography	Mauro Veloso	Won	
2021	Guadalajara International Film Festival	Best Ibero-American Fiction Film	My Brothers Dream Awake	Won	
2021	Guadalajara International Film Festival	Best Screenplay	Claudia Huaiquimilla & Pablo Greene	Won	
2021	Guadalajara International Film Festival	Best Actor	Iván Cáceres	Won	
2021	Valladolid International Film Festival	Punto de Encuentro - Special Mention	My Brothers Dream Awake	Won	
2021	Chicago International Film Festival	New Directors Competition - Gold Hugo	My Brothers Dream Awake	Nominated	
2021	Cineuropa Festival	Best Performance	Iván Cáceres	Won	
2021	FELINA National and International Film Festival in Linarense	Best International Film	My Brothers Dream Awake	Won	
2021	Circle of Art Critics of Chile	Best Chilean Film	My Brothers Dream Awake	Won	
2022	Chilean Film Festival	Best Director	Claudia Huaiquimilla	Won	
2022	Chilean Film Festival	Best Art Direction	Karla Molina	Won	
2022	Chilean Film Festival	Audience Award	My Brothers Dream Awake	Won	
2022	Ñuble National Film Festival	Audience Award	My Brothers Dream Awake	Won	
2022	Palm Springs International Film Festival	Best Ibero-American Film	My Brothers Dream Awake	Nominated	
2022	Palm Springs International Film Festival	Young Cineastes Award	My Brothers Dream Awake	Nominated	
2022	Toulouse Latin Film Festival	Coup de Cœur	My Brothers Dream Awake	Won	
2022	Toulouse Latin Film Festival	Audience Award	My Brothers Dream Awake	Won	
2022	Ojo Loco Iberian and Latin American Film Festival	Audience Award	My Brothers Dream Awake	Won	
2022	Ojo Loco Iberian and Latin American Film Festival	Student Jury Award	My Brothers Dream Awake	Won	
2022	Reflets Cinéma Ibérique & Latin American Festival	Audience Award	My Brothers Dream Awake	Won	
2022	Latino Film Festival Tuebingen	Audience Award	My Brothers Dream Awake	Won	
2022	Ojo de Pescado International Film Festival for Children and Youth	Best International Youth Film	My Brothers Dream Awake	Won	
2022	Las Alturas International Film Festival	Special Mention of the Jury	My Brothers Dream Awake	Won	
2022	Las Alturas International Film Festival	Best Screenplay for Fiction Feature Films	Claudia Huaiquimilla & Pablo Greene	Won	
2022	Caleuche Awards	Best Leading Actor	Iván Cáceres	Nominated	
2022	Caleuche Awards	Best Supporting Actress	Paulina García	Nominated	
2022	Caleuche Awards	Best Supporting Actress	Julia Lübbert	Nominated	
2022	Caleuche Awards	Best Supporting Actor	Sebastián Ayala	Nominated	
2022	Caleuche Awards	Best Supporting Actor	Andrew Bargsted	Nominated	
2022	Ariel Awards	Best Ibero-American Film	My Brothers Dream Awake	Nominated	
