= Ariel Mateluna =

Chilean actor (born 1989)

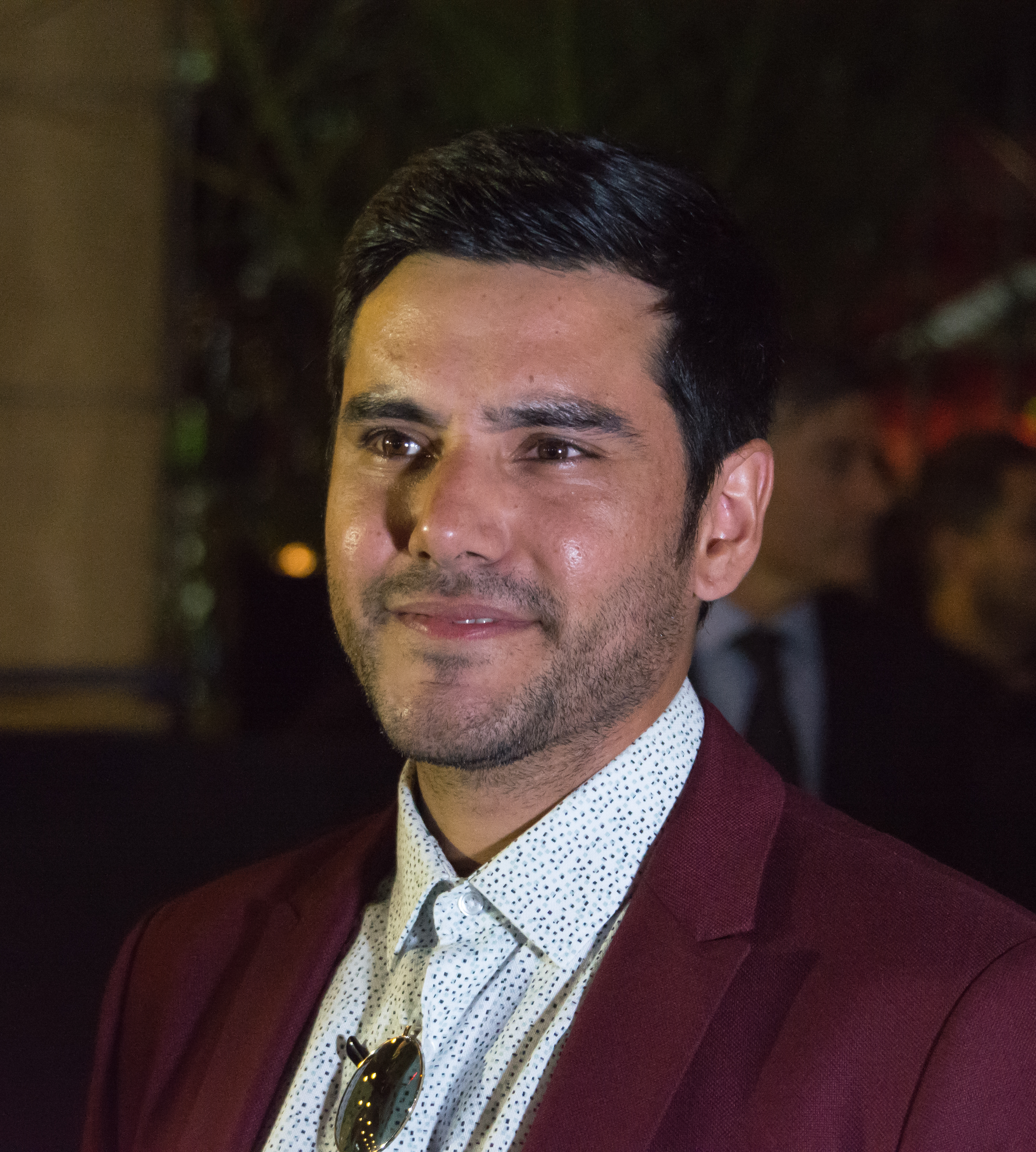
- Born: 21 March 1989 (age 37); Independencia, Chile
- Occupation: Actor
- Years active: 2004-present

Ariel Mateluna (born 21 March 1989) is a Chilean actor. He appeared in more than twenty films since 2004.

== Selected filmography ==
Year	Title	Role	Notes
2004	Machuca	Pedro	
2007	Mirageman	Tito Gutierrez	
2014	To Kill a Man	Jorgito	
2020	La Verónica	Javier	
2021	My Brothers Dream Awake	Bad Influence	
