= Spider (2019 film) =

2019 film

- Theatrical release poster
- Directed by: Andrés Wood
- Written by: Guillermo Calderón
- Produced by: Paula Cosenza; Alejandra Garcia; Nathalia Videla Peña
- Starring: María Valverde; Mercedes Morán
- Cinematography: M.I. Littin-Menz
- Edited by: Andrea Chignoli
- Music by: Antonio Pinto
- Production companies: Bossa Nova Films; Magma Cine; Wood Producciones
- Release date: 15 August 2019
- Running time: 105 minutes
- Countries: Chile; Argentina; Brazil
- Languages: Spanish; German; Haitian Creole

Spider (Spanish: Araña) is a 2019 political thriller film directed by Andrés Wood and written by Guillermo Calderón. It was screened in the Contemporary World Cinema section at the 2019 Toronto International Film Festival. It was selected as the Chilean entry for the Best International Feature Film at the 92nd Academy Awards, but it was not nominated. It is a co-production between Chile, Argentina and Brazil.

== Plot ==
Inés (22), along with her husband Justo (28) and their best friend Gerardo (23), are members of Fatherland and Liberty, a violent paramilitary group with nationalist and neo-fascist ideological orientation that committed multiple terrorist acts with the purpose of overthrowing the left-wing government of the Popular Unity in the early 1970s. The title of the film refers to the emblem used by this group, which is commonly known as "The Spider" or "The Black Spider" in reference to the similarity between the logo and those arachnids.

In the midst of this struggle, they become embroiled in a risky and passionate love triangle. Together, they commit a political crime that changes the history of the country and, in the process, involves them in a betrayal that separates them forever.

Forty years later, Gerardo reappears. He is not only driven by revenge, but also by his youthful obsession to revive the nationalist cause. The police catch him with a war arsenal in his house, and Inés, now a powerful and influential businesswoman, will do everything in her power to prevent Gerardo from revealing her past or that of her husband.

== Cast ==
- María Valverde as Young Inés
- Mercedes Morán as Inés
- Marcelo Alonso as Gerardo
- Pedro Fontaine as young Gerardo
- Felipe Armas as Justo
- Gabriel Urzúa as young Justo
- María Gracia Omegna as Nadia
- Mario Horton as José
- Benjamin Westfall as Doctor Sepulveda
- Jaime Vadell as Don Ricardo
- Caio Blat as Antonio
- Martín Salcedo as José's brother

== Reception ==
On the review aggregator website Rotten Tomatoes, 90% of 10 critics' reviews are positive.

== See also ==
- List of submissions to the 92nd Academy Awards for Best International Feature Film
- List of Chilean submissions for the Academy Award for Best International Feature Film
