= Saint George's College, Santiago =

Saint George's College

Location
- Av. Santa. Cruz 5400; Vitacura, Santiago Metropolitan Region; Chile
- Coordinates: 33.384°S 70.600°W

Information
- Type: Private School
- Motto: Recte ad ardua
- Principal: Paula Noemi
- Grades: Kinder-12
- Enrollment: ~2,650
- Colors: Navy blue and Yellow
- Team name: Georgians
- Website: http://www.saintgeorge.cl/

Saint George's College, founded in 1936 and run by the Congregation of Holy Cross, is a private bilingual school in Santiago, Chile. It is one of the most renowned educational establishments in the country, famous for educating Chile's elite. According to Seminarium, a third of the CEOs of the top 200 companies in Chile are graduates of the school.

== History ==
Three Holy Cross priests arrived in Santiago, Chile, on March 1, 1943, at the invitation of José María Cardinal Caro, Archbishop of Santiago, to administer Saint George's College. Fathers William Havey, Alfred Send, and Joseph Doherty believed they were going to do university work, not knowing that "college" meant a school of first through 12th graders.

St. George's was the only private school in Chile to be taken over by military government following the September 1973 coup. The Congregation returned to the school in 1986.

Originally an all-boys school, Saint George's College was made co-educational in 1973. It was initially located in the Pedro de Valdivia part of Providencia, in 1970 it was relocated to Vitacura.

Its traditional rival schools are Colegio del Verbo Divino, Colegio San Ignacio, and Santiago College which were originally located near one another in the Pedro de Valdivia neighborhood of Providencia.

A group of parents and teachers, dissatisfied with the Liberation Theology measures imposed by Father Gerard Whelan during the early 1970s, broke off in 1972 and formed Colegio Tabancura, an Opus Dei-run boys' school.

== Campus ==
Throughout its history, Saint George's College has had two locations, being moved from Providencia to the northern limit of Vitacura. Currently, the campus located in La Pirámide totals 241,086 square meters of land or 60 acres.

The school hosts extensive sports facilities, including a multi-sport gymnasium, an athletic track with bleachers with a capacity of 3,000 people, an exercise machine room, volleyball, soccer, basketball, and rugby courts. The school has multiple study rooms in addition to a three-level library. In 2011, the Science and Technology Building was inaugurated, with rooms equipped with computers, laboratory equipment, and interactive whiteboards in addition to a pre-school laboratory and an auditorium. Thanks to its installation of photovoltaic panels, the building runs 100% on solar energy. Other facilities include the nursery, computer labs, rooms equipped for music and arts, the scout corner (project selected for the Chile Architecture Biennial), the chapel, the theater, amphitheater, and the 11th and 12th grade building. The school has a casino, commercial cafeteria, two kiosks and a school supplies store.

== Notable alumni ==
- José Miguel Insulza (Class of 1961) – Socialist politician, senator of the Arica y Parinacota Region since 2018.
- Andrés Pascal Allende (Class of 1962) – Marxist revolutionary and nephew of Salvador Allende.
- Eliodoro Matte (Class of 1963) - Chilean millionaire
- Andrés Wood (Class of 1983) – filmmaker; director and producer of Machuca.
- Gonzalo Lira (Class of 1985) - filmmaker, author and blogger.
- Marco Enríquez-Ominami (Class of 1990) – Progressive politician, member of the Chamber of Deputies from 2006 to 2010.
- Francisca Valenzuela - American-born singer, songwriter, and poet; daughter of scientist Pablo Valenzuela

== See also ==
- Machuca, a 2004 movie connected to events at the school.
