= Viña del Mar International Film Festival =

- 2019 Film Festival poster
- Location: Viña del Mar, Chile
- Founded: 1963
- Awards: Films and documentary films from Latin America; Short films and documentary films from Latin America; International competition of short films by film schools Competition for local works Special Categories: DOCULAB Andino; Best music competition Work in Progress
- Hosted by: The city of Viña del Mar.
- Language: Spanish
- Website: http://www.cinevina.cl/

The Viña del Mar International Film Festival (Spanish: Festival Internacional de Cine de Viña del Mar, FICVIÑA) is a Latin American film festival held annually in Viña del Mar, Chile.

== History ==
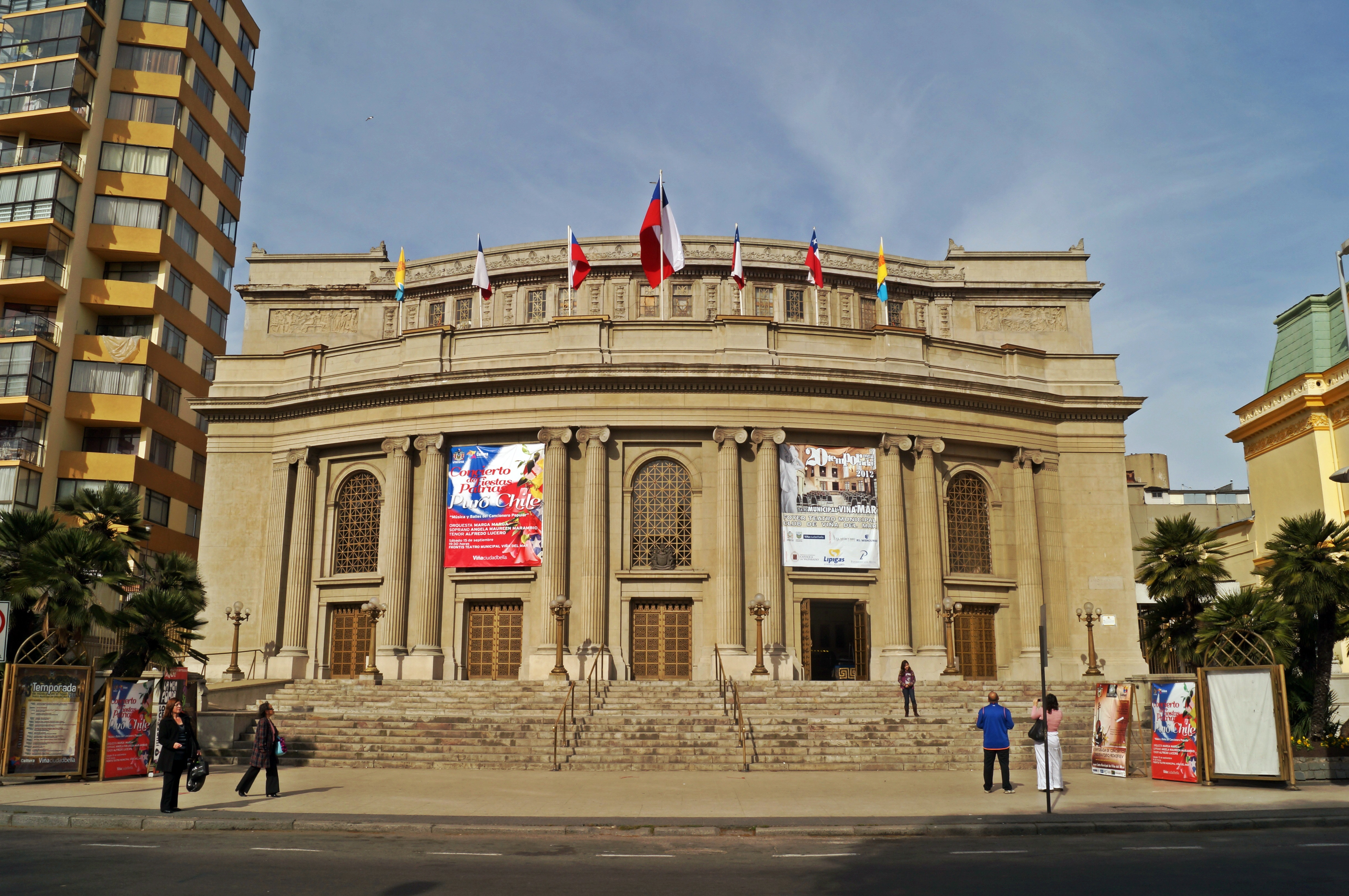
Viña del Mar Municipal Theatre, main venue of the FICVIÑA Festival

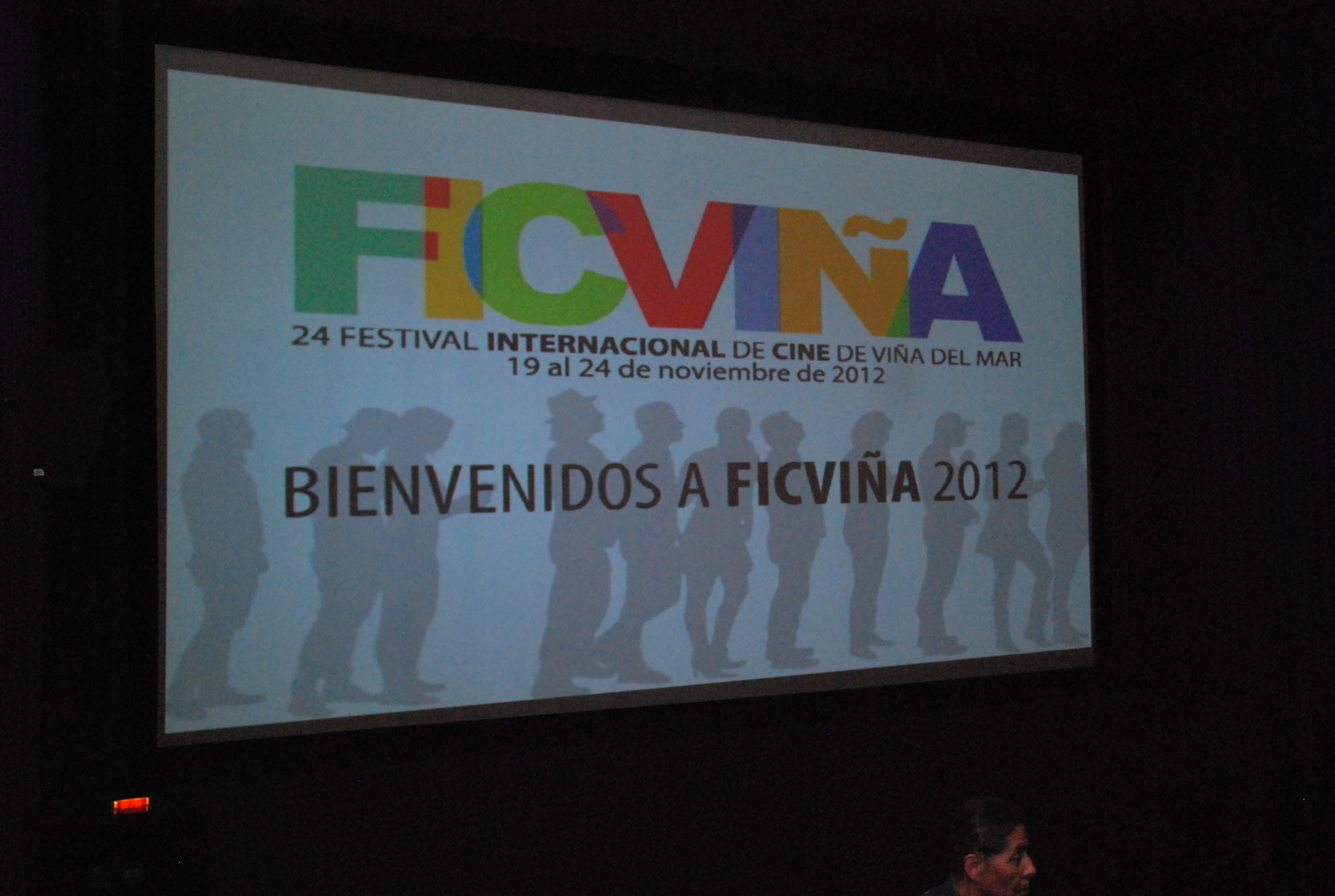
FICVIÑA 2012. Welcome poster

The idea for a Chilean film festival was born in 1962, when the Viña del Mar Film Club was created by a group of film aficionados. In 1963 the first Amateur Film Festival was held, and the following year the festival opened to films from the Latin American region. This festival dropped the “amateur” to become Chile’s first international film festival in 1967, inaugurated by Aldo Francia.

Between 1970 and 2000, the festival was suspended due to the political climate in Chile. In 2007, the festival celebrated its 40th anniversary. The festival became free for visitors in 2012 and 2014, Mexico was the invited guest.

== Award ==
Awards for the festival are the Paoa, a statue made of wood from the Pou tree native to Easter Island. The statues have two heads, representing the duality of day and night. Each statue is made by hand by Miguel Nahoe and no two are identical.

The official competition of the festival is divided into the following categories:

- International Feature Film Competition
- International Documentary Competition
- International Short Film Competition
- International Animated Short Film Competition
- National Short Film Competition
- Regional Documentary Competition
- Short Film Competition for National Film Schools
- Documentary Competition for National Film School
- Work in Progress
- Competition for Best Film Soundtrack

=== Gran Paoa Prize Winners- Best International Film ===
Year	English Title	Original Title	Director	Country
2003	Sub terra	Sub terra	Marcelo Ferrari	Chile
2004	Machuca	Machuca	Andrés Wood	Chile
2005	In Bed	En la cama	Matías Bize	Chile
2006	Forbidden to Forbid	Proibido Proibir	Jorge Durán	Brazil
2007	The grain	O Grão	Petrus Cariry	Brazil
2008	The Pope's Toilet	El baño del Papa	César Charlone and Enrique Fernández	Uruguay
2009	Huacho	Huacho	Alejandro Fernández Almendras	Chile
2010	Portraits in a Sea of Lies	Retratos en un mar de mentiras	Carlos Gaviria	Colombia
2011	The Colors of the Mountain	Los colores de la montaña	Carlos César Arbeláez	Colombia
2012	Death penalty	Pena de Muerte	Tevo Díaz	Chile
2013	The Golden Dream	La Jaula de Oro	Diego Quemada-Díez	Mexico
2014	Heli	Heli	Amat Escalante	Mexico
2015	The Boss, Anatomy of a Crime	El patrón: radiografía de un crimen	Sebastián Schindel	Argentina
2016	From Afar	Desde allá	Lorenzo Vigas	Venezuela
2017	Last Days in Havana	Últimos días en La Habana	Fernando Pérez	Cuba
2018	The Heiresses	Las herederas	Marcelo Martinessi	Paraguay
2019	Monos	Monos	Alejandro Landes	Colombia

== See also ==
- Valdivia International Film Festival
- Santiago International Film Festival
- Cinema of Chile

=== External links ===
- Viña del Mar International Film Festival official website (in Spanish)
