= Comrades (1986 film) =

1986 film by Bill Douglas

- British 2009 DVD cover
- Directed by: Bill Douglas
- Written by: Bill Douglas
- Produced by: Simon Relph
- Starring: Keith Allen
- Cinematography: Gale Tattersall
- Edited by: Mick Audsley
- Production companies: Skreba Films; FilmFour International
- Distributed by: Curzon Film Distributors
- Release dates: February 1986 (Premiere); 23 August 1987 (United Kingdom)
- Running time: 183 minutes
- Country: United Kingdom
- Language: English
- Budget: £3 million

Comrades is a 1986 British historical drama film directed by Bill Douglas and starring an ensemble cast including Robin Soans, Phil Davis, Keith Allen, Robert Stephens, Vanessa Redgrave and James Fox. Through the pictures of a travelling lanternist, it depicts the story of the Tolpuddle Martyrs, who were arrested and transported to Australia in 1834 for trying to improve their conditions by forming an early form of trade union. It was Bill Douglas's last film.

== Cast ==
In credits order:

- Robin Soans as George Loveless, leader of the Tolpuddle Martyrs
- William Gaminara as James Loveless, George Loveless's younger brother
- Stephen Bateman as Old (Tom) Standfield
- Philip Davis as Young (John) Standfield, Old Standfield's son
- Jeremy Flynn as James Brine
- Keith Allen as James Hammett
- Alex Norton as Lanternist, Sergeant Bell, Diorama Showman, Laughing Cavalier, Wollaston, Ranger, Tramp, Sea Captain, McCallum, Silhouettist, and Mad Photographer
- Michael Clark as Sailor
- John Lee as Juggler
- Arthur Dignam as Fop, Hammett's master in New South Wales
- James Fox as William Norfolk, (fictitious) Governor of New South Wales
- John Hargreaves as Convict
- Michael Hordern as Mr Pitt, campaigner for the Martyrs' freedom
- Freddie Jones as Vicar of Tolpuddle
- Murray Melvin as Frampton's Clerk
- Vanessa Redgrave as Mrs Violet Carlyle, owner of a New South Wales sheep station
- Robert Stephens as James Frampton, Squire of Tolpuddle
- Barbara Windsor as Mrs Wetham, owner of a Dorchester print shop
- Imelda Staunton as Betsy Loveless, wife of George Loveless
- Katy Behean as Sarah Loveless, wife of James Loveless
- Amber Wilkinson as Hetty Loveless, daughter of George Loveless
- Patricia Healey as Mrs Brine, mother of James Brine
- Shane Downe as Joseph Brine, younger brother of James Brine
- Sandra Voe as Diana Standfield, wife of Old Standfield, mother of Young Standfield
- Valerie Whittington as Elvi Standfield, daughter of Old Standfield, younger sister of Young Standfield
- Harriet Doyle as Charity Standfield, daughter of Old Tom Standfield, younger sister of Young Standfield
- Patrick Field as John Hammett, brother of James Hammett, the village carpenter
- Heather Page as Bridget Hammett, wife of John Hammett
- Joanna David as Mrs Frampton
- Trevor Ainsley as Gentlemen Farmer #1
- Malcolm Terris as Gentlemen Farmer #2
- Dave Atkins as Frampton's Foreman
- Alex McCrindle as Jailor
- Shane Briant as Official in New South Wales
- Lynette Curran as Prostitute in New South Wales
- Symon Parsonage as Charlie, a teenage convict
- Anna Volska as Woman in White at Auction

== Production ==
The film had a very long and troubled production. Although Bill Douglas had the screenplay ready in 1980, it took six years to complete it, due to problems of filming in England and Australia, Douglas's perfectionism, and conflicts with his first producer, Ismail Merchant. Parts of the film were shot in the ghost town of Tyneham in south Dorset which was taken over by the military during WWII for use as a training area and is still part of a large military range.

== Release ==
The film was first shown at the Southampton Film Festival in February 1986. It was also shown at the London Film Festival in 1986, and entered into the 37th Berlin International Film Festival in February 1987. In August 1987 it was released in British cinemas.

After a short run in cinemas, followed by a VHS release in 1989, the film was largely forgotten. However, 20 years later Bill Douglas's small but significant production was reappraised, and in 2009 the British Film Institute released a restored version of Comrades on DVD, followed in early 2012 by a three-disc dual format DVD and Blu-ray box set.

== Reception ==
The film has been described as "a moving, magical poem of human dignity, decency and hope". Sheila Rowbotham praised the film as a "poetic and painterly work which was also a vigorous challenge to Thatcherism" and complimented Gale Tattersall's cinematography, while also identifying various flaws deriving "from the grandeur of Douglas's cinematic ambition".
