= Association of Independent Producers =

Association of Independent Producers was founded in London, England, in March 1976 by Richard Craven.

The Association began as a response to then-Prime Minister Harold Wilson's announcement of the formation of the Prime Minister's Working Party to examine how a British Film Authority might be established with government funds to promote British film production. The American Hollywood presence in the UK appeared to dominate the British Film Producers Association, which did not attract independent filmmakers as members. As a result, independent talent felt ostracised, lacking information, contacts and infrastructure.

As a result, AIP quickly found over 450 paid members and set up a council of 40, most of whom had never met each other. They included: David Puttnam, Simon Perry, Mike Hodges, Anthony Simmons, Mark Shivas, Ben Lewin, Tom Clarke, Derek Malcolm, Jack Hazan, Rex Pyke, Michael Radford, Jack Gold, John Fletcher, Nick Hart-Williams and Aida Young.

The council of 40 chaired by Richard Craven, administered by Melanie Friesen, examined the workings of the National Film Finance Corporation chaired by Sir John Terry and proposed that it set up a National Film Development Fund to support the writing of domestic screenplays for cinema.

In October 1977, AIP began publishing its own monthly magazine called AIP & Co (Editor Nick Pole) which was circulated to the industry and every member of the House of Commons. In the same year AIP looked at the workings and infrastructure of the existing British film industry in the "Report of the All-Industry Committee of The Film Industry 1977" chaired by Robert Bolt, which covered all sectors including exhibitors and distributors. The report was the result of 12 sessions which took place between September 1976 and July 1977 and made recommendations to the Prime Ministers Working Party for the proposed British Film Authority.
