= Alejandro Fernández Almendras =

Chilean filmmaker

- Born: Chillán
- Occupation: Film director

Alejandro Fernández Almendras (born 1971) is a filmmaker from southern Chile who is best known for slow-moving naturalistic dramas.

== Select filmography ==
- Huacho (2009)
- Sentados frente al fuego (2011)
- To Kill a Man (2014)
- Much Ado About Nothing (2016)
- My friend Alexis (2019)
