= Andrés Wood =

Chilean film director, producer and writer

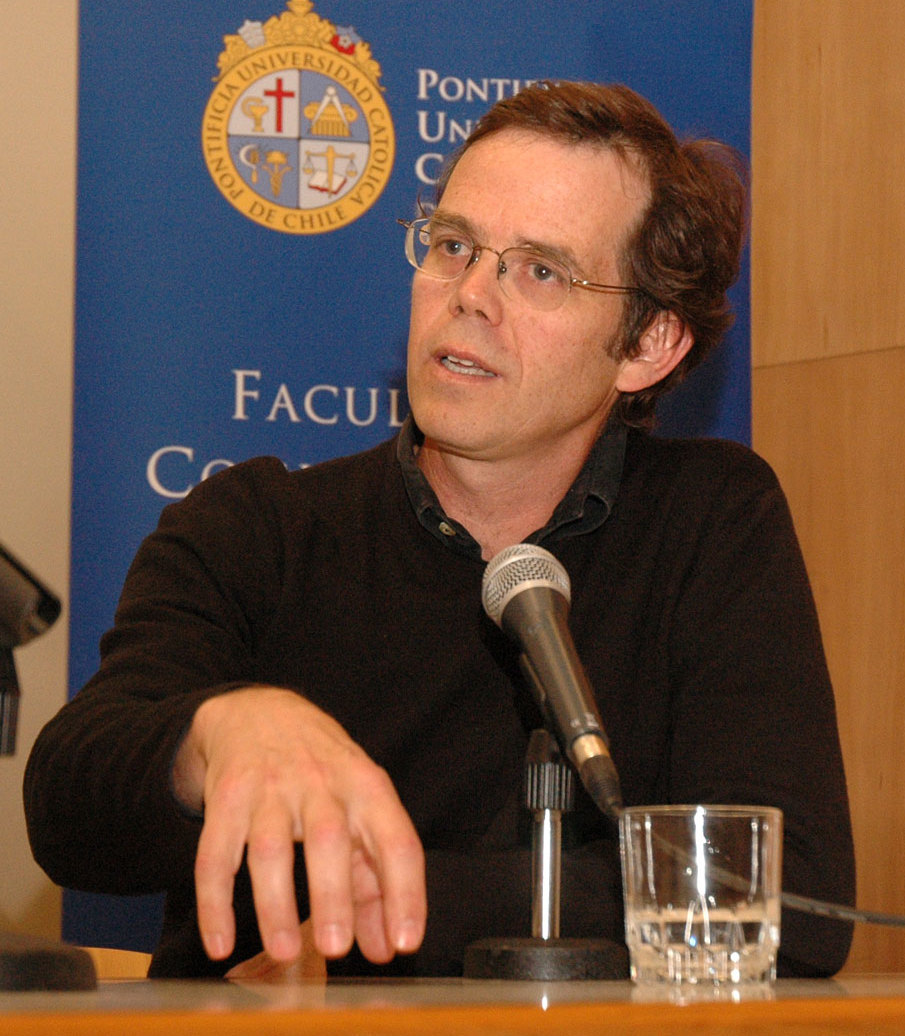
- Andrés Wood in 2008
- Born: Andrés Wood Montt; September 14, 1965 (age 61); Santiago, Chile
- Education: Pontifical Catholic University of Chile
- Occupations: Film director, Producer, Screen-writer
- Years active: 1994 – present
- Spouse: Paz Puga
- Children: Ana Wood, Mariano Wood, Amanda Wood

Andrés Wood Montt (born 14 September 1965) is a Chilean film director, producer and writer. Some of his most popular films include Machuca, Violeta se fue a los cielos, and Historias de Futbol. He created his own production company known as Wood Producciones in 1993.

== Early life and education ==
Born in Santiago, Chile, Wood is Chilean of Irish and Scottish descent. He grew up in a middle-class home and credits much of his artistic influence to his childhood in Chile based on the political climate of the country, specifically with the Pinochet dictatorship. Wood's father worked as an architect while his mother taught kindergarten. Both of his parents were conservative and favored an end to the Allende government. However, Wood had the opportunity to study at elite but progressive institutions throughout his life.

Andres Wood attended Saint George's College. He graduated as an economist from the Pontifical Catholic University of Chile in 1988. In 1991 he attended New York University, majoring in film production.

== Career ==
While most of his work is focused on film, Andres Wood is also responsible for producing the most popular television series in Chile called "Los 80" (Wood Producciones). In addition, Andres Wood's most recent project involves directing a miniseries based on human rights lawyer Carmen Hertz, titled Ecos Del Desierto. The film is a part of the special programming marking the 40th anniversary of the military takeover in Chile during the 1970s. "Ecos del Desierto" is the most expensive project in Chile costing $200 thousand per episode.

Cinema production in Chile is still dependent on production companies overseas. Many of Wood's projects are productions with international entities. His primary concern is preserving the authenticity of the films. Wood is part of the post-dictatorship generation whose filmmakers are concerned with highlighting the impact that the Pinochet dictatorship between 1973 and 1989 had on Chilean society and how society can "work through" the trauma by reliving it on the screen.

== Influence ==
Wood has always been a film lover and fell in love with the process of filmmaking. Wood describes his artistic process as the following: "First I get in love with the characters, then with small anecdotes and at the end something like the context. I do believe that film has to be very personal." Moreover, Wood believes that cinema can help to create discussion and with that, changes in society. Machuca, Andres Wood's most successful film by high box office sales and international recognition, takes place during the 1970s and is based on his own experiences at Saint George's College. The film exemplifies the Pinochet dictatorship's influence on his films. When asked about the recurring political theme dealing with the Pinochet dictatorship in his projects, Andres Wood explained:

The dictatorship affected all of society in different ways. Some people were politically affected, others were affected because they were not aware of what was happening, others were in favor, others against, some were victims, some were murderers. Everyone was affected due to economic changes (for good and bad). It is impossible to do a film that doesn't have some footprint of the dictatorship.

Andres Wood's Machuca was named one of the Top 20 Latin American films and as a result, some believe this places him as one of the greatest Latin American directors of his generation.

== Filmography as director ==
- Historias de fútbol (1997)
- El Desquite (1999)
- Nuestro Siglo (1999)
- La Fiebre del Loco (2001)
- Machuca (2004)
- The Good Life (2008)
- Violeta Went to Heaven (2011)
- Spider (2019)

== Awards and nominations ==
The following is a comprehensive list of all the awards and nominations for Andres Wood's projects:

Altazor Awards:

- 2000: Best Director of a Motion Picture (El Desquite, nominated)
- 2000: Best Screenplay of a Motion Picture (El Desquite, nominated)
- 2014: Outstanding Directing for a Drama Series (Ecos del Desierto, won)

Argentinian Film Critics Association Awards:

- 2012: Best Foreign Film Violeta se fue a los cielos, nominated)

Ariel Award:

- 2005: Best Latin-American Film (Machuca, nominated)
- 2012: Best Latin-American Film (Violeta se fue a los cielos, nominated)

Bogota Film Festival:

- 2004: Best Film (Machuca, won)

Cartagena Film Festival:

- 1998: Best First Work (Historias de Futbol, won)
- 1998: Best Film (Historias de Futbol, nominated)
- 2002: Best Film (La Fiebre del Loco, nominated)
- 2009: Best Film (La Buena Vida, nominated)

Cine Ceara- Ibero Americano Film Festival:

- 2012: Best Film (Violeta Se Fue A Los Cielos, won)
- 2012: Best Screenplay (Violeta Se Fue A Los Cielos, won)

Filmfest Hamburg:

- 2012: Art Cinema Award (Violeta Se Fue A Los Cielos, nominated)

Ghent International Film Festival:

- 2004: Grand Prix (Machuca, nominated)

Gijón International Film Festival:

- 2001: Best Feature (La Fiebre del Loco, nominated)

Goya Awards:

- 2005: Best Spanish Language Foreign Films (Machuca, nominated)
- 2009: Best Spanish Language Foreign Film (La Buena Vida, won)
- 2012: Best Iberoamerican Film (Violeta Se Fue A Los Cielos, nominated)

Gramado Film Festival:

- 1998: Best Film (Historias de Futbol, nominated)

Guadalajara Film Festival:

- 2012: Best Film (Violeta Se Fue A Los Cielos, won)

Havana Film Festival:

- 1999: Best Unpublished Screenplay (La Fiebre del Loco, won)
- 2008: Best Film (La Buena Vida, won)
- 2012: Best Film (Violeta Se Fue A Los Cielos, won)

Huelva Latin American Film Festival:

- 2008: Best Film (La Buena Vida, won)

Lima Latin American Film Festival:

- 2004: Elcine First Prize (Machuca, won)

Lleida Latin-American Film Festival:

- 2002: Best Director (La Fiebre del Loco, won)
- 2009: Best Director (La Buena Vida, won)

Los Premios MTV Latinoamérica:

- 2001: Favorite Film (La Fiebre Del Loco, nominated)

Miami Film Festival:

- 2012: Special Mention (Violeta Se Fue A Los Cielos, won)
- 2012: Grand Jury Prize (Violeta Se Fue A Los Cielos, won)

Oslo Films from the South Festival:

- 2012: Best Feature (Violeta Se Fue A Los Cielos, nominated)

Peñíscola Comedy Film Festival:

- 1998: Best Latin Film (Historias de Futbol, won)

Philadelphia Film Festival:

- 2005: Best Feature Film (Machuca, won)

San Sebastian International Film Festival:

- 1997: Best New Director- Special Mention (Historias de Futbol, won)
- 2012: Grand Jury Prize- World Cinema (Violeta Se Fue A Los Cielos, won)

Valdivia International Film Festival:

- 2004: Best Film (Machuca, won)

Vancouver International Film Festival:

- 2004: Most Popular Film (Machuca, won)

Viña del Mar International Film Festival:

- 2004: Grand Paoa (Machuca, won)
