= George the Hedgehog (film) =

- Theatrical release poster
- Directed by: Wojciech Wawszczyk; Jakub Tarkowski; Tomasz Leśniak
- Screenplay by: Rafał Skarżycki
- Based on: Jeż Jerzy by Rafał Skarżycki and Tomasz Lew Leśniak
- Starring: Borys Szyc; Maria Peszek; Maciej Maleńczuk; Sokół; Michał Koterski
- Edited by: Wojciech Włodarski
- Music by: Jan Duszyński; Jacek Szymkiewicz
- Production companies: Paisa Films; Produkcja
- Distributed by: Monolith Films
- Release date: 11 March 2011
- Running time: 90 minutes
- Country: Poland
- Language: Polish
- Budget: 2.6 million zł

George the Hedgehog (Polish: Jeż Jerzy) is a 2011 Polish adult animated black comedy film directed by Wojciech Wawszczyk, Jakub Tarkowski and Tomasz Leśniak. Based on the Jeż Jerzy comic books, it tells the story of two neo-Nazis and a mad scientist creating a clone of the title character in an attempt to defeat him.

== Plot ==
The story began in the Professor's lab, where he and his assistant are conducting an experiment. As a result, the computer produced the image of a hedgehog. Professor sent his assistant to find one.

The next day, skinheads Stefan and Zenek attacked anthropomorphic hedgehog Jerzy and his lover Yola, but they were defeated. They were approached by the assistant, who offered them a job. He took them to the Professor's lab and told them to acquire Jerzy's DNA, then kill him. They secured the DNA and created a clone, but Jerzy survived. The assistant explained that from their analysis it seemed Jerzy had the full potential to become a pop star, but there was a problem: he couldn't be contained.

Jerzy met up with Yola, but the clone appeared and assaulted Yola. She became angry and left. As Jerzy tried to explain, he's captured by the assistant, who had mistaken him for the clone. He escaped, but he was seen by Stefan and Zenek, who collided with the clone and beat him, before being stopped by Yola. She drove the clone home, thinking he's the original Jerzy. However, as the clone abused her again, she threw him out of the taxi and drove home.

The true Jerzy was waiting there, but Yola didn't listen to him. Zenek asked Jerzy to meet under the Poniatowskiego bridge by pretending to be Yola. There, Jerzy was knocked unconscious and thrown into the river. He was eventually rescued by the prostitute Lilka.

The clone became an international celebrity. Yola wanted to come to terms with Jerzy. She met Lilka, who started to suspect the truth. Jerzy decided to regain his good name. He broke into a concert where the clone was performing and revealed the truth. A fight ensued, and a beam fell and crushed the clone.

Yola witnessed the fight and tried to reach Jerzy, but she's captured by the assistant. Jerzy pursued them and the assistant was arrested. Yola finally came to terms with Jerzy. As they talked on the bridge, the Professor found out that the clone was still alive, but let him go, believing he'll manage without him. However, the clone was found by the two Vietnamese chefs and turned into a meal.

== Cast ==
- Borys Szyc as George the Hedgehog
- Maria Peszek as Yola
- Sokół as Stefan
- Michał Koterski as Zenek
- Wojtek Wawszczyk as the clone
- Marcin Hycnar as Krzyś
- Maciej Maleńczuk as Lilka
- Krystyna Tkacz as Stefan's mother
- Grzegorz Pawlak as the scientist
- Jarosław Boberek as the assistant
- Leszek Teleszyński as the politician

== Production ==
The film project was initiated by Paisa Films in 2007 and co-produced with Produkcja which joined in 2009. The production received 1.6 million złoty from the Polish Film Institute and had a total budget of 2.6 million złoty. The film was digitally animated and combines cutout and 3D techniques. It took two years to make and involved a team of 14 people, although according to co-director Wojciech Wawszczyk, "everyone worked for six". After the script was finished the actors recorded their lines. In August 2010 the animation work was completed and editing began.

== Release ==
The premiere was on 11 March 2011 in Poland through Monolith Films.

== See also ==
- Tim and the Master
