= Pokemón =

Mid-2000s Chilean youth subculture

Pokemón was a youth subculture that emerged among Chile's young population in the mid-2000s and experienced a decline by late 2009, ultimately becoming extinct by 2012. Recognizable by their angular and pressed hairstyles reminiscent of characters from the Japanese franchise Pokémon, Pokemones were one of the largest and most well-known urban tribes in the country.

Although Pokemones shared certain similarities in dress with other urban tribes like otaku and emo, they differed in their interests and musical preferences. Pokemón was a fusion of otaku and flaite subcultures but did not actively follow anime like otaku or share the musical tastes of flaite. Alongside borrowing elements from emo, such as sideswept bangs, Pokemones also incorporated aspects of punk and the local "hardcore" subculture. Compared to the stereotypes of emo and otaku, Pokemones were more lively and extroverted. Most Pokemones were teenagers who enjoyed dancing to reggaeton music at parties and engaging in kissing and physical contact, referred to as poncear, with multiple individuals regardless of gender. They heavily utilized the Internet, particularly the image-sharing site Fotolog, for trading photos of themselves and communicated through MSN Messenger.

Typically hailing from Chile's middle and lower-class backgrounds, Pokemones were often juxtaposed with another group known as peloláis, which consisted of affluent girls with long, straight, and fair hair attending private Catholic schools.

In January 2008, messages advocating violence against Pokemones began circulating online, primarily due to their adoption of various elements from other subcultures, including emo hairstyles, hip-hop clothing, and the Crip Walk dance style. These incidents led to an increase in physical attacks against Pokemones outside of clubs and bars. In response, the Chilean government and student leaders from Santiago organized a joint anti-violence campaign called the "Foundation for a Better Future."

== See also ==
- Flaite
- Flogger, a contemporary Argentine youth culture
