= Low culture =

Forms of popular culture with mass appeal

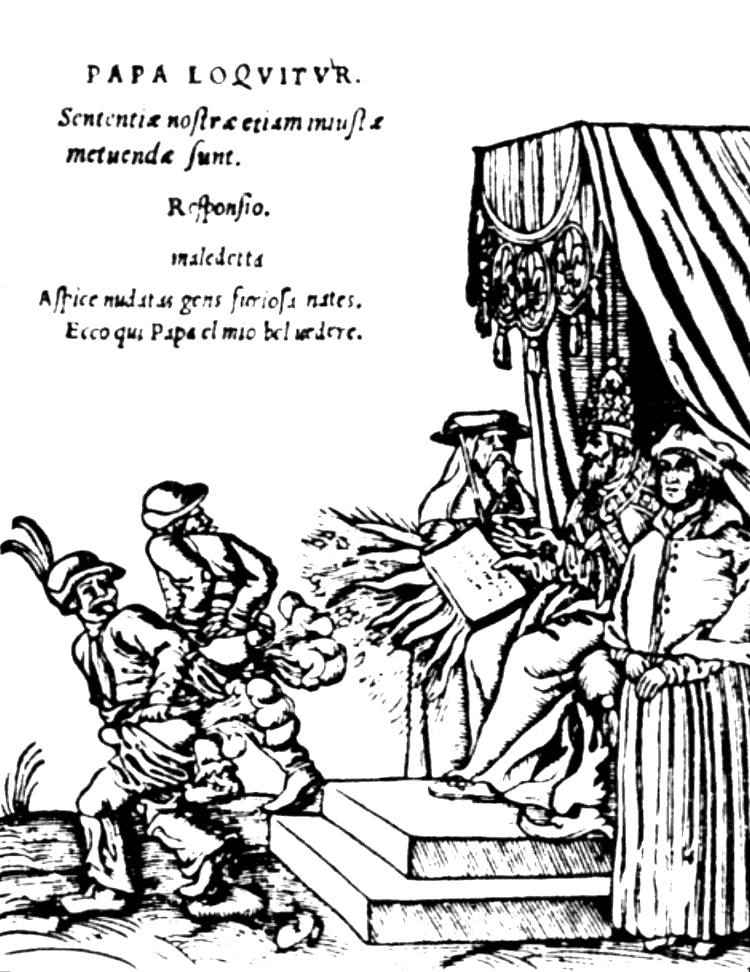
Low-culture humor from the Papstsbotbilder (Depictions of Papal Messages, 1545) series of wood cuts, by Lucas Cranach the Elder, showing German peasants baring their buttocks and farting in response to a papal bull of Pope Paul III

Low culture is made up of forms of popular culture that have mass appeal, often broadly appealing to the middle or lower cultures of any given society. This is in contrast to the forms of high culture that appeal to a smaller, often upper-class proportion of the populace. Culture theory proposes that both high culture and low culture are subcultures within a society, because the culture industry mass-produces each type of popular culture for every socioeconomic class. Despite being viewed as characteristic of less-educated social classes, low culture is still often enjoyed by upper classes as well. This makes the content that falls under this categorization the most broadly consumed kind of media in a culture overall.

Various forms of low culture can be found across a variety of cultures, with the physical objects composing these mediums often being constructed from less expensive, perishable materials. The phrase low culture has come to be viewed by some as a derogatory idea in and of itself, existing to put down elements of pop or tribal culture that others may deem to be "inferior."

== Standards and definitions ==
In Popular Culture and High Culture: An Analysis and Evaluation of Taste (1958), Herbert J. Gans said:

Aesthetic standards of low culture stress substance, form being totally subservient, and there is no explicit concern with abstract ideas or even with fictional forms of contemporary social problems and issues. . . . Low culture emphasizes morality, but limits itself to familial and individual problems and [specific] values, which apply to such problems. Low culture is content to depict traditional working class values winning out over the temptation to give in to conflicting impulses and behavior patterns.

In other words, low culture is often associated with media that presents smaller-scale or individual experiences that are easier for the general public to identify with.

== History ==
Physical artifacts from low culture are normally cheaply and often crudely made, as well as often small, in contrast to the comparatively grand public art or luxury objects of high culture. While this is a necessity for this low culture media to be broadly disseminated, it has also contributed to its reputation as low-brow or of lesser merit. The cheapness of the materials, many of which are perishable, generally means that their survival and preservation in modern times is rare. There are exceptions, especially in pottery and graffiti on stone. An ostracon is a small piece of pottery (or sometimes stone) which has been written on, for any of a number of purposes, among which curse tablets or more positive magical spells such as love magic are common. Wood must have been a common material, but survives for long periods only in certain climatic conditions, such as Egypt and other very arid areas, and permanently wet and slightly acidic peat bogs.

Once printing (and paper) became relatively cheap, popular prints became increasingly widespread by the late Renaissance. This technology also allowed for the production of cheap texts in street literature such as broadsides and broadside ballads, typically new topical words to a familiar tune. These examples became extremely common, but were treated as ephemera, so survival of this material is relatively uncommon.

Folk music is another notable historical manifestation of low culture. Much traditional folk music was only written down, and later mechanically recorded, in the 19th century, as growing nationalist sentiments in many countries generated interest from middle class enthusiasts. In comparison to other forms of music, such as music written for orchestras or by well-known classical composers, folk music was considered a product of low culture given its association with the more popular, cruder tastes of those who created it. This social separation between folk and classical music was also influenced by the traditions and expectations followed by the latter, which was often written for use in religious settings that demanded certain consistencies in the musical structure. Instead, folk music (along with its successor, contemporary folk music) is thought of as a reflection of common themes present in its community of origin. These combined traits help define folk music as an early, widespread form of low culture, for which the lower/working classes were both the largest producers and consumers.

=== Modern day ===
The phrase trash culture began to enter the public lexicon in the 1980s as a classification for these kinds of recent low-cultural expressions. This kind of content is often considered to be either vulgar, in poor taste, or lacking in-depth artistic merit. With the explosion of tabloid journalism and sensationalistic reality television throughout the late 20th century, many modern artists such as Brett Easton Ellis would use these works as inspirations to bridge the gap between the confines of high and low culture. The result of this on his work in particular has been media that could belong to either categorization based on the grotesque nature of his works content mixed with the depth more characteristic of other high-brow works.

== Culture as social class ==
Each social class possesses its own versions of high and low culture, the definition and content of which are determined by the socioeconomic and educational particulars of the people who compose said social class. This falls in line with the sociological theory known as habitus, which states that the way that people perceive and respond to the social world they inhabit is through their personal habits, skills, and disposition of character. Therefore, what exactly constitutes high culture and low culture has specific meanings and usages that are collectively determined by the members of any respective social class. However, people of higher social classes often view the cultural objects they consume as having a higher societal standing than that taken in by lower classes. This makes the distinction between high and low culture one drawn along social standings, a trend that has resulted in the art and content that makes up low culture being regularly discredited throughout history.

=== Variation by country ===
The demographics who make up lower social classes have often been given specific phrases to refer to their classification as being of a lower social standing. These varying groups, who are usually made up of younger and poorer individuals, are often viewed as being a part of regionally specific delinquent subcultures. The following variations of these types of groups are stereotypical of the audiences who consume low culture works.

- Bogan – Unrefined or unsophisticated person in Australia and New Zealand.
- Chav – Stereotype of anti-social youth dressed in sportswear in the United Kingdom.
- Dres – Member of a Polish chav-like subculture that originated in the 1990s.
- Flaite – Chilean urban lower-class youth.
- Gopnik – Russian and Eastern European term for delinquent. Characterized as wearing Adidas tracksuits.
- Redneck – Derogatory term applied to a white person from the rural South of the United States.
- Skeet (Newfoundland) – A derogatory, stereotypical phrase used within the Canadian province of Newfoundland and Labrador used to refer to someone who is ignorant, aggressive and unruly.

== Popular examples ==
=== Popular prints ===
Common throughout the 1400s to 1700s in Europe, popular prints highlight some of the key identifying features of low culture media. Shortly after innovations in printing technology such as moveable type, popular prints became a useful tool for spreading political, religious, and social ideas to the working class—emphasis was placed on adding artwork or visually appealing designs in order to maximize readership in societies which, at the time, were not fully literate. These prints contributed to pioneering satirical content, varying portrayals of common subcultures at the time, and other subject matter that is still found in modern-day low culture media.

Popular prints are also observed in Chinese society from the late 1800s to mid-1900s, in which they were intended to be readily accessible to the majority of consumers (i.e., the working or middle classes). Similarly to those found in Europe, the Chinese prints would emphasize design elements such as colorful designs and relatively inexpensive production, which led to their frequent consumption for both spreading various sociopolitical ideas or decorative purposes. This usage of brief, eye-catching marketing strategy allowed the prints, much like their European counterparts, to appeal to a wider audience that would be receptive to both the entertainment and political content they contained.

Although the reach of popular prints was both far spanning and effective, its classification as a lower art made it less desirable to higher classes, especially during the art form's earlier years when the drawings themselves were more crude and simply produced due to necessity. As printing techniques advanced, and the quality of the art itself improved during the 17th and 18th centuries, higher social classes began to take more interest in it. This has allowed for more of this genre's later works to survive into the modern age, with earlier, 15th century era works being lost to time due to the perishable nature of printing materials.

=== Toilet humor ===
Also referred to as potty or scatological humor, toilet humor is a brand of off-color humor that deals with defecation, urination, and other bodily functions that would often be deemed as societally taboo. Although most forms of off-color comedy could be viewed as a kind of low culture, toilet humor in particular has received this connotation due to the comedy style's frequent interest amongst toddlers and young children, for whom cultural taboos related to the acknowledgement of waste excretion still have a degree of novelty. For this reason, toilet humor has come to be regularly viewed as juvenile, although it has continued to find success in a number of modern settings such as in the Captain Underpants and South Park media franchises. This relation between low culture and what is enjoyed by children demonstrates a regular pattern in who is seen to find low culture appealing.

=== Lowbrow art movement ===
Arising in the Los Angeles, California, area during the 1960s, Lowbrow was an underground visual art movement that took inspiration from other popular forms of low culture art of the time such as underground comix, punk music, tiki culture, and graffiti. The phrase for this style was coined by artist Robert Williams, who decided to name a 1979 book containing his paintings as The Lowbrow Art of Robt. Williams, in opposition to the idea of high-brow art following the initial rejection of recognition of his work from several pre-established art institutions. The movement has also been referred to as "pop surrealism" in some circles (and likewise Williams himself has referred to it as "cartoon-tainted abstract surrealism"), where the feeling appears to be that the label "lowbrow" may be inappropriate, given the artistic merit found in the movement's artists. Despite initial pushback from contemporary critics, the movement has begun to be taken more seriously as the years have gone on, with the first formal gallery exhibition displaying the works of the movement being orchestrated in 1992 by Greg Escalante at the Julie Rico Gallery in Santa Monica.

=== Internet memes ===
Many well-known examples of modern low culture are represented by online memes that can quickly spread through various social media or messaging platforms. In the context of modern internet culture, memes are cultural ideas (often in the form of images, videos, or vernacular phrases) that have gradually developed certain contextual meanings for their audiences. Memes are often shared by internet users in an informal setting, often with the intent of humor, satire, or social commentary; these behaviors frequently lead to certain images reaching a status of near-universal recognition and fame across the internet. The rapid popularization of Pepe the Frog as a meme in the mid-2010s highlights the variety of symbolic purposes that any one meme can be applied to represent. The image, which can be traced back to a comic book character created by Matt Furie in 2005, was heavily reused and shared across various online forums in later years. Eventually, Pepe's presence spread to a number of far-right communities on the website 4chan, in which it later became associated with hate speech. This sudden shift in usage prompted more serious analysis in other circles, including sociology and other academic communities, as the meme's spread and highly varied usage by different online groups represented a unique kind of media that could influence future political discourse, particularly among middle- or lower-class internet users.

=== Reality television ===
Since its inception in the 1990s, the reality television genre has been a commonly cited example of low culture in contemporary times. Reality television has been labelled as low culture due to its usage of the word "reality" when most drama and conflicts are manufactured, widespread appeal, glorification of wealth and fame, and promotion of materialism. English actor and filmmaker Gary Oldman described reality television as "the museum of social decay." The genre's overreliance on schadenfreude, the pleasure of seeing another's humiliation or misfortune is also a contributor to why reality television is often cited as low culture. American digital magazine, Entertainment Weekly wrote "Do we watch reality television for precious insight into the human condition? Please. We watch for those awkward scenes that make us feel a smidge better about our own little unfilmed lives" regarding the genre succeeding from the public humiliation of others.

== Mass media ==
=== Audience ===
All cultural products (especially high culture) have a certain demographic to which they appeal most. In regard to low culture, it often appeals to very simple and basic human emotional needs, while also offering a perceived return to innocence. This escape from real world problems comes from the experience of being able to live vicariously through the lives of others by viewing them through various forms of media. While the audiences that consume low culture tend to originate from lower socioeconomic classes, those considered 'elite' can also interact with this media. An example of this interaction between classes can be found in outsider art, which is often created by individuals without a background in the fine arts—interestingly, it has been heavily associated with consumption by higher classes throughout the 20th century in a notable example of higher classes consuming media that was neither generated by nor specifically intended to catch their attention.

=== Stereotypes ===
Low culture can often be formulaic, employing trope conventions, stock characters, and character archetypes in a manner that can be perceived as more simplistic, crude, emotive, unbalanced, or blunt compared to the ways in which a piece of high culture would implement them. This leads to the perception of high culture as being more subtle, balanced, or refined and open for interpretation in comparison with its lower counterpart. Modern media that would often be constituted as low culture often continues to implement stereotypes, often to comment or critique them in a satirical manner.

=== Cross-cultural artifacts ===
The use and display of different cultural artifacts, especially in the West, has been studied as an example of low culture consumed by upper classes. Certain examples of these artifacts, such as artwork from African cultures, may be found in higher-income establishments with no ties to these cultures, a phenomenon that has been described as "cultural omnivorousness [sic]," with the aim of creating a more distinguished air in the interior design of the owners' business or living spaces. These cases exemplify another means by which media deemed low culture can still be consumed by socioeconomic classes besides those with which it is chiefly associated, or notably for which it has primarily been created.

== Examples of low culture ==
- AI slop – Low effort content generated entirely by generative artificial intelligence
- Brain rot – Low quality online content
- Bread and circuses – Figure of speech referring to a superficial means of appeasement
- Content farm – Online platform that generates low-effort online content at a rapid rate to satisfy algorithms
- Kitsch – Art that is considered naïve or overly sentimental in how banal or obvious it is
- Outsider art – Art created outside the boundaries of official culture by those untrained in the arts
- Philistinism – Hostility to intellect, art and beauty
- Tabloid journalism – A popular style of sensationalized journalism known for being lurid and vulgar in nature (similar to yellow journalism)
- Toilet humour – Type of off-color humor dealing with defecation, urination and flatulence
- Tribal art, also known as primitive art – Art made by the indigenous tribes that has been categorized by some as "low culture"

== See also ==
- Culture industry – Expression suggesting that popular culture is used to manipulate mass society into passivity
- Culturology – A branch of social sciences with the scientific understanding and analysis of cultures as a whole
- High culture – Cultural objects which a society deems to be intellectually and artistically exemplary (the opposite of low culture)
- Mass society – Society based on relations between huge numbers of people, whose prototypical denizen is the "mass man"
- Off-color humor – Figure of speech used to describe jokes of a vulgar nature
- Middlebrow – Art qualification meaning middle of the road, often from a lack of or deviation from convention
- Trash culture – Artistic or entertainment expressions considered of low cultural profile
- Working-class culture – Cultures created by or popular among working-class people
