= Dyhzy =

Argentinian drag queen, cosplayer, and social media influencer

- Tani Fernandez Luchetti
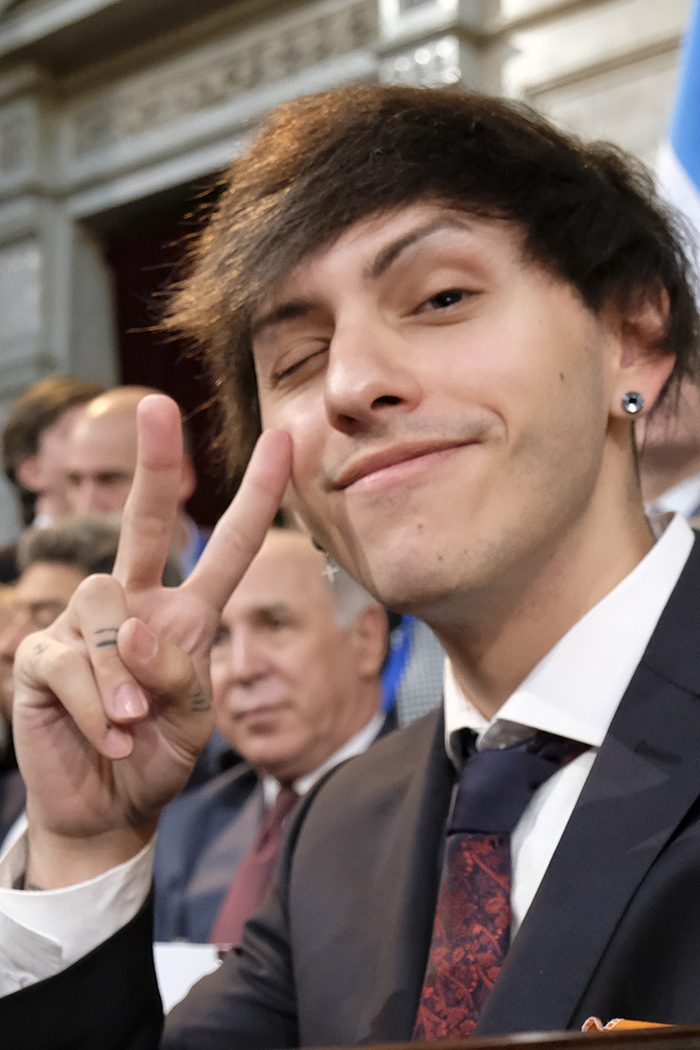
- Fernandez at their father's inauguration in 2019
- Born: Estanislao Fernández; 1994 or 1995 (age 30–31); Belgrano, Buenos Aires
- Occupations: Drag queen, cosplayer, social media influencer
- Parents: Alberto Fernández (father); Marcela Luchetti (mother)

Dyhzy is the professional name of Tani Fernandez Luchetti, an Argentinian drag queen, cosplayer, and social media influencer. Born Estanislao Fernández, they are the child of former president of Argentina Alberto Fernández. They gained wider public attention after their father's election and subsequently after their 2021 coming out as non-binary.

== Biography ==
Dyhzy is the child of former president of Argentina Alberto Fernández. They were born in the Belgrano neighborhood of Buenos Aires as Estanislao Fernandez Luchetti, after their father's friends. They have stated they began creating social media content in 2008 with Fotolog, and subsequently also began creating content on Twitter and Tumblr, in both of which becoming one of the first Argentinians to use the app. They began using Instagram not long before 2019. According to them, they transferred schools in 2010 due to being bullied for being effeminate and due to their classmates being homophobic. They also had myopia from a young age. They have been in relationships with both men and women.

They became known on social media for their drag and their creative cosplays, and also worked in insurance and studied designs. Their cosplays have included a Spice Girl, Catwoman, Harley Quinn, and Pikachu. As of 2019, they had more than 120,000 followers. They have posted thirst traps as well.

They temporarily deleted their social media during their father's campaign, but campaigned for their father to help him win the youth vote. They have received internet bullying on their social media.

After their father won the 2019 Argentine general election to become president, he commented that they "seems to be respected and very recognized. I have pride in my son, how can I not be proud?" and called them a "great man". Eduardo Bolsonaro posted an image comparing Dyhzy unfavorably to himself, described as "political homophobia" by PinkNews, to which Dyhzy responded, in part, "Love always conquers hate". They wore a rainbow flag to their father's inauguration.

Between 2020 and 2021, they received death threats from multiple people. One of these people was subsequently charged and convicted of harassment.

In 2021, after their father legalized the granting of non-binary identification cards, they revealed that they are nonbinary and would be utilizing a non-binary identification card.
