= El regreso (TV series) =

- Also known as: El Regreso: Por ellos, ha vuelto
- Genre: Telenovela
- Directed by: Nicolas Alemparte
- Starring: Alejandra Fosalba; Iván Álvarez de Araya; María José Illanes; Felipe Contreras; Monica Carrasco; Teresita Reyes; Sara Becker; Macarena Teke; Grabriel Cañas
- Opening theme: Red Planet
- Ending theme: Into the Black Hole
- Country of origin: Chile
- Original language: Spanish
- No. of episodes: 140

Production
- Executive producer: Patricio López
- Production locations: Santiago, Chile
- Production company: Televisión Nacional de Chile

Original release
- Network: TVN
- Release: October 14, 2013 – May 5, 2014

Related
- Solamente Julia; Volver a Amar

El Regreso (Spanish for The Return) is a 2013-2014 Chilean telenovela produced and broadcast by TVN.

== Cast ==
- Alejandra Fosalba as Fátima Massar
- Iván Álvarez de Araya as Diego Alcántara
- María José Illanes as Victoria Mondragón
- Felipe Contreras as Javier Rivas
- Mónica Carrasco as Rosa "Rosita" Moreno
- Teresita Reyes as Nina "Turca" Abdalha
- César Caillet as Néstor Bulnes
- Tamara Ferreira as Soo Hee
- Gabriel Cañas as Miguelo Abdalha
- Macarena Teke as Filomena "Filito" Gutiérrez
- Luis Kanashiro as Kim Myung
- Félix Villar as Wa Chong
- Sara Becker as Sofía Alcántara
- Luka Villalabeitía as Tomás Alcántara

=== Special participations ===
- Nicole Pérez-Yarza as Claudia Larenas
- Catalina Silva as Loreto Williams
- Otilio Castro as El Jeque
- Felipe Gómez Badilla as Rocco
