= Nathalia Aragonese =

Chilean actress & director (born 1981)

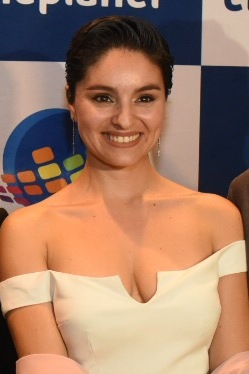
- Born: Nathalia Aragonese Molina; September 9, 1981 (age 45); Santiago, Chile
- Occupation: Actress
- Children: 1

Nathalia Aragonese Molina (born September 9, 1981 in Santiago) is a Chilean television, film, and theater actress and theater director. She is known for her roles in Volver a Amar (2014), La Doña (2011) and Esa No Soy Yo (2015), and starring in the film Damn Kids (Cabros de mierda) directed by Gonzalo Justiniano.

== Biography ==
She studied theater with Fernando González. She made her television debut in 2004 on the telenovela Hippie on Canal 13 where she made a small appearance, and then in 2005 on the show Gatas y tuercas.

In 2006, she was contracted by Televisión Nacional de Chile to play Maya Fritzenwalden in the Chilean television series Floribella.

She played Rocío Poblete in the 2008 Chilean remake of The Office called La ofis. She also played a role in Casados con hijos, the Chilean remake of Married... with Children.

In 2010 she played Pascuala in Manuel Rodríguez and starred in the television series La Doña.

She was in a music video for De Saloon in 2014.

She made her directorial debut in 2015 with La guerra del agua, a montage about the global crisis of water scarcity.

In 2017, she starred in the movie Cabros de Mierda by director Gonzalo Justiniano.

== Personal life ==
She was a partner to actor Mario Horton, whom she met on the set of Floribella, from 2007 to 2011. They had a child together named Milagros in 2008.

Since 2012 she has been in a relationship with director Rodrigo Susarte.

== Filmography ==
=== Television ===
- Hippie, 2004
- Gatas y tuercas, 2005
- Alguien te mira, 2007
- Mea Culpa, 2007 / 2009
- Casado con hijos, 2008
- La Ofis, 2008
- Manuel Rodríguez, 2010
- La Doña, 2010
- Los 80, 2013
- Las Vega's, 2013
- Lo que callamos las mujeres, 2013
- Volver a amar, 2014
- Esa no soy yo, 2015
- Tranquilo papá, 2017

=== Film ===
- Low Tide, 2010
- 03:34: Earthquake in Chile, 2011
- El hombre aficionado, 2016
- Prueba de actitud, 2016
- Talca, París y Londres, 2017
- Damn Kids (Cabros de mierda), 2017
