= Świerszczyk =

Polish children's magazine

- Editor-in-Chief: Małgorzata Węgrzecka
- Former editors: Wanda Grodzieńska (founding editor)
- Categories: Children's
- Frequency: Biweekly
- Founded: 1945
- First issue: May 1, 1945; 80 years ago
- Company: Nowa Era
- Country: Poland
- Based in: Warsaw
- Language: Polish
- Website: swierszczyk.pl
- ISSN: 0491-8193
- OCLC: 46876939

Świerszczyk (Polish pronunciation: [ˈɕfjɛr.ʂt͡ʂɘk], Polish for little cricket) is an illustrated Polish children's biweekly magazine published since 1945. The publisher of the magazine is Nowa Era. Many popular Polish authors of children's magazines, such as Hanna Januszewska, Jan Brzechwa, Ewa Szelburg-Zarembina, Olga Siemaszkowa, Lucyna Krzemieniecka and Jan Marcin Szancer wrote for the publication, and Jeż Jerzy, a popular modern Polish comic, debuted there.

== Footnotes ==
- "1 maja 1945 r. Pierwszy numer "Świerszczyka"". Interia.
