= Esa no soy yo =

- Genre: Serial drama
- Created by: Camila Villagrán
- Written by: Malu Arriola; Camila Villagrán; Carlos Oporto; David Bustos; Mónica Dominguez
- Directed by: Christian Maringer
- Starring: Camila Hirane; Matias Oviedo; Cristián Carvajal; Luis Uribe; Javiera Hernández; Claudia Pérez
- Opening theme: "Yo no soy esa" by Mari Trini
- Country of origin: Chile
- Original language: Spanish
- No. of seasons: 1
- No. of episodes: 162

Production
- Executive producers: Alejandro Burr; Pablo Díaz
- Producer: María Luisa Sousa
- Production locations: Santiago, Chile
- Production company: DDRío Televisión

Original release
- Network: TVN
- Release: August 24, 2015 – April 11, 2016

Related
- La chúcara

Esa no soy yo (lit: That's not me) is a Chilean drama television series that aired on the main channel of Televisión Nacional de Chile from August 24, 2015, to April 11, 2016, starring Camila Hirane, Matías Oviedo, and Cristián Carvajal.

== Plot ==
Judith and Anahí Marin-Gonzalez (Camila Hirane) are two twin sisters, who are complete opposites. Judith is a famous hairdresser, while her sister Anahí is involved with the rich. When Judith's ex, Brian (Luis Uribe), is freed from prison, she asks for help from her twin sister to escape out of the city. The day she's supposed to meet her sister, she finds Anahí dead in the bathtub. She swears vengeance and fakes her death by taking her sister's identity. She discovers that her sister made a lot of enemies and had a relationship with Alfredo Labarca-Ruiz, a famous doctor, ex-husband of Antonia (Claudia Pérez) and father of Celina Labarca (Valentina Carvajal). She wants revenge, but falls herself falling in love with her sister's fiance; meanwhile the killer is at large. One of her confidantes is Julio Chavez (Cristián Carvajal), a police officer, who keeps her secret of her true identity. Eventually, everything comes to into light and everyone finds out that Anahí is really Judith.

== Cast ==
=== Main characters ===
- Camila Hirane as Judith Marin-Gonzalez / Anahí Marin-Gonzalez.
- Matias Oviedo as Alfredo Labarca-Ruiz.
- Cristián Carvajal as Julio Chavez.
- Luis Uribe as Brian Ortiz.
- Claudia Perez as Antonia del Mazo Acuña.
- Antonio Campos as Claudio Labarca-Santos del Mazo.

=== Supporting characters ===
- Javiera Hernández as Gilda Munch Fuentes.
- Patricio Achurra as Ramon Marin.
- Mónica Carrasco as Hortencia Salinas.
- Carmen Disa Gutierrez as Socorro del Carmen.
- Valentina Carvajal as Celina Labarca.
- Nathalia Aragonese as Erika Gallo.
- Paulina Eguiluz as Officer Lorena Pino.
- Marcelo Valdivieso as Manuel Gonzalez Lagos.
- Nicolás Pérez as Johnny Perez Salinas.
- Camila Nuñez as Nataly Espejo Pizarro.
- Pablo Diaz del Río as Bruno Undurraga Vial.
- Rolando Valenzuela as Deputy Dario Santos.
- Andres Arriola as Peralta Detective.
