= Volver a amar =

- Also known as: Nunca nadie habia sentido tanta pasion a las 15:00 hrs
- Genre: Telenovela
- Created by: Camila Villagrán; Malú Arriola; Rosario Valenzuela
- Directed by: Felipe Arratia
- Starring: Adela Secall; César Sepúlveda; Felipe Braun; Carmen Disa Gutiérrez; Erto Pandoja; Gloria Laso; Cecilia Cucurella; Marcela Osorio; Gabriel Prieto
- Opening theme: Volver a amar by Cristian Castro
- Country of origin: Chile
- Original language: Spanish
- No. of episodes: 140

Production
- Executive producer: Alejandro Burr
- Production locations: Santiago, Chile
- Production company: Televisión Nacional de Chile

Original release
- Network: TVN
- Release: May 5 – December 1, 2014

Related
- El Regreso; La Chúcara

Volver a Amar (English: To Love Again) is a 2014 Chilean telenovela produced and broadcast by TVN in 2014.

== Cast ==
- Adela Secall as María Paz Villaseñor
- César Sepúlveda as Luis Pizarro
- Felipe Braun as Franco Andrade
- Carmen Disa Gutiérrez as Carmen Véliz
- Erto Pantoja as Juvenal Pizarro
- Gloria Laso as Blanca Hernández
- Cecilia Cucurella as Aurora del Sante
- Marcela Osorio as Betsabé Tapia
- Gabriel Prieto as Salustio Corrales
- Ignacia Allamand as Olivia Thompson
- José Palma as Pablo Errázuriz
- Marcela Medel as Rosa Peña
- Nathalia Aragonese as Nancy Corrales
- Cristián Chaparro as Víctor Núñez "Buho"
- Trinidad Gormaz as Martina Pizarro
- Carlos Briones as William Peña

== See also ==
- Televisión Nacional de Chile
