= Alberto Fernández =

President of Argentina from 2019 to 2023

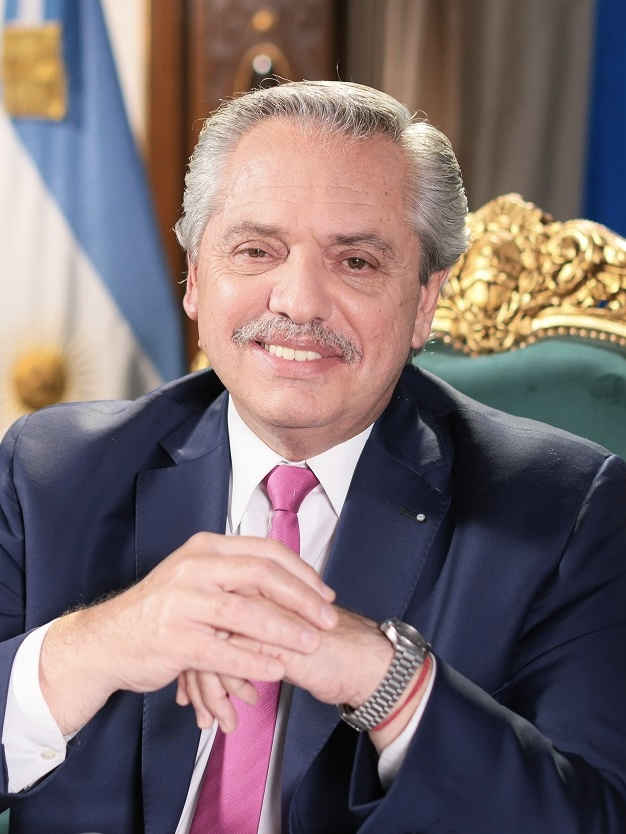
- Official portrait, 2021

President of Argentina
- In office 10 December 2019 – 10 December 2023
- Vice President: Cristina Fernández de Kirchner
- Preceded by: Mauricio Macri
- Succeeded by: Javier Milei

Chief of the Cabinet of Ministers
- In office 25 May 2003 – 23 July 2008
- President: Néstor Kirchner; Cristina Fernández de Kirchner
- Preceded by: Alfredo Atanasof
- Succeeded by: Sergio Massa

Legislator of Buenos Aires City
- In office 7 August 2000 – 25 May 2003
- Constituency: At-large

Superintendent of Insurance
- In office 1 August 1989 – 8 December 1995
- President: Carlos Menem
- Preceded by: Diego Peluffo
- Succeeded by: Claudio Moroni

President of the Justicialist Party
- In office 22 March 2021 – 14 August 2024
- Preceded by: José Luis Gioja
- Succeeded by: Cristina Fernández de Kirchner

Personal details
- Born: Alberto Ángel Fernández; 2 April 1959 (age 67) Buenos Aires, Argentina
- Party: Justicialist (1983–2013; 2017–present); Renewal Front (2013–2017); UNIR Constitutional Nationalist Party (1982–1983)
- Other political affiliations: Union for the Homeland (2023–present); Everyone's Front (2019–2023); Citizen's Unity (2018–2019); Justicialist Front Comply (2017–2018); Front for Victory (2003–2017)
- Spouse: Marcela Luchetti (m. 1993; div. 2005)
- Domestic partners: Fabiola Yáñez (2014–2024); Vilma Ibarra (2005–2014)
- Children: 2 (including Tani)
- Education: University of Buenos Aires
- Occupation: Politician; lawyer; academic

Alberto Ángel Fernández (Latin American Spanish: [alˈβeɾto ˈaŋxel feɾˈnandes]; born 2 April 1959) is an Argentine politician, lawyer, and academic who served as President of Argentina from 2019 to 2023. He was also the Chief of the Cabinet of Ministers from 2003 to 2008. His tenure as Cabinet Chief remains the longest since the post was created in 1994.

Born in Buenos Aires, Fernández attended the University of Buenos Aires, where he earned his law degree at age 24, and later became a professor of criminal law. Ideologically a Peronist, entered public service as an adviser to Deliberative Council of Buenos Aires and the Argentine Chamber of Deputies. In 2003, he was appointed Chief of the Cabinet of Ministers, serving during the entirety of the presidency of Néstor Kirchner, and the early months of the presidency of Cristina Fernández de Kirchner.

A member of the Justicialist Party, a Peronist party, Fernández was the party's candidate for the 2019 presidential election under the leftist Frente de Todos alliance and defeated incumbent president Mauricio Macri with 48% of the vote. His political position has been described as centrist. The first two years of his presidency were limited by the COVID-19 pandemic in Argentina, during which he imposed strict lockdown measures to suppress the spread of the disease, and a debt crisis inherited from his predecessor. While the economy recovered in 2021–22, inflation rose to 100% (the highest since 1991). Initially a figure with record approval ratings in his first year, these became generally low afterwards throughout his presidency, with only a few measurements of majority approval, and disapproval ratings mostly ranging from 60% to 80%.

According to British newspaper The Economist, Fernández was considered "a president without a plan", and his presidency to be a "weak administration". In April 2023, Fernández announced that he decided to not seek reelection to the presidency in the 2023 presidential election. He was succeeded by Javier Milei on 10 December 2023. Leaving office with a disapproval rate of around 80%, Fernández's presidency is widely regarded by critics and historians as one of the worst in Argentine history.

== Early life and career ==
Fernández was born in Buenos Aires, the son of Celia Pérez and her first husband. Separated from the latter, Celia (sister of the personal photographer of Juan Domingo Perón) married Judge Carlos Pelagio Galíndez (son of a Senator of the Radical Civic Union). Fernández, who barely knew his biological father, considers Pelagio to be his father.

Fernández attended the University of Buenos Aires Faculty of Law. He graduated at the age of 24, and later became a professor of criminal law. He entered public service as an adviser to Deliberative Council of Buenos Aires and the Argentine Chamber of Deputies. He became deputy director of Legal Affairs of the Economy Ministry, and in this capacity served as chief Argentine negotiator at the GATT Uruguay Round. Nominated by newly elected President Carlos Menem to serve as Superintendent of Insurance, Fernández served as President of the Latin American Insurance Managers' Association from 1989 to 1992, and co-founded the Insurance Managers International Association. He also served as adviser to Mercosur and ALADI on insurance law, and was involved in insurance and health services companies in the private sector. Fernández was named one of the Ten Outstanding Young People of Argentina in 1992, and was awarded the Millennium Award as one of the nation's Businessmen of the Century. During this time he became politically close to former Buenos Aires Province Governor Eduardo Duhalde.

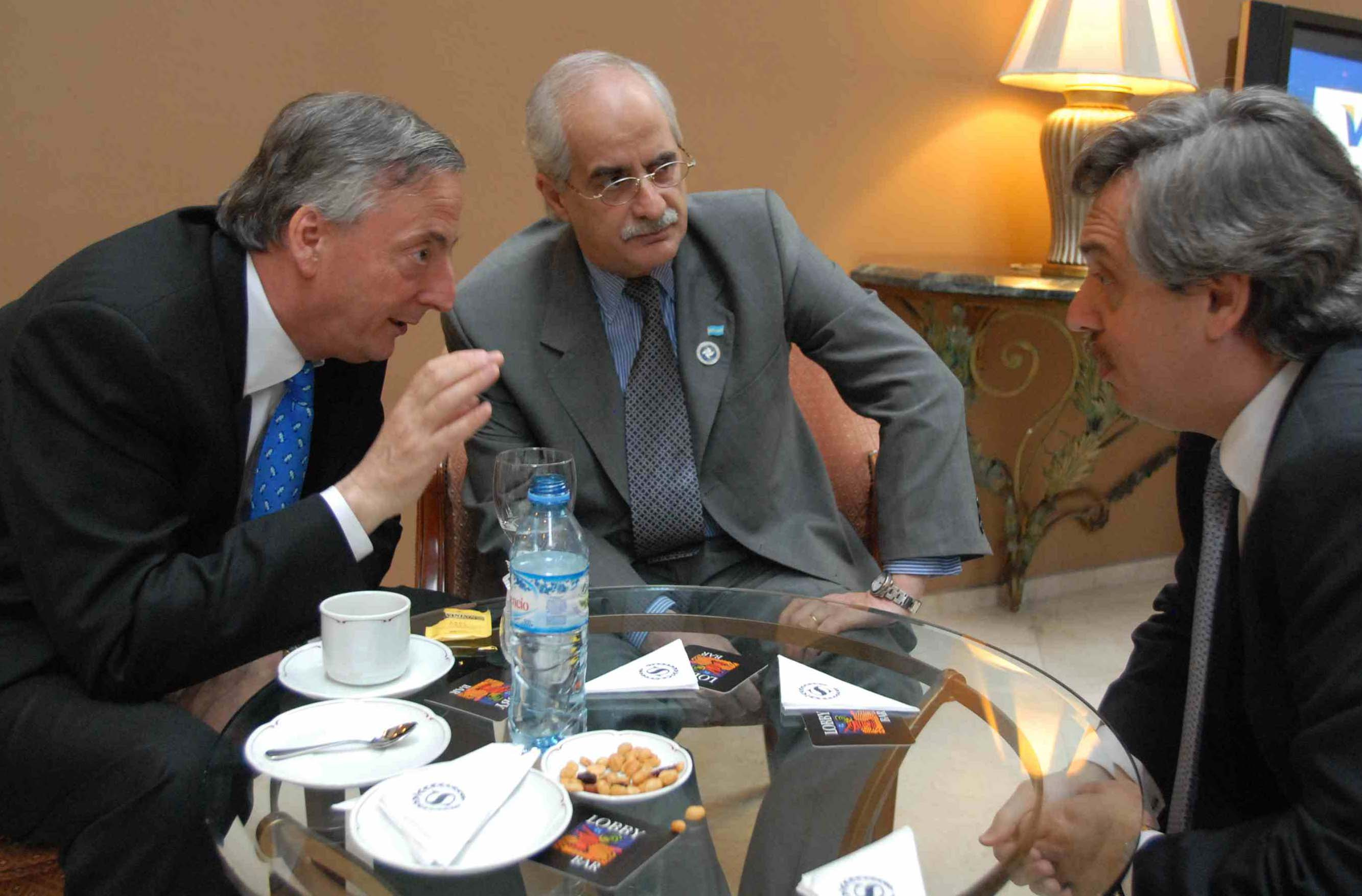
Fernández (right) with President Néstor Kirchner and Foreign Minister Jorge Taiana in 2007

He was elected on 7 June 2000, to the Buenos Aires City Legislature on the conservative Action for the Republic ticket led by former Economy Minister Domingo Cavallo.

== Chief of the Cabinet (2003–2008) ==
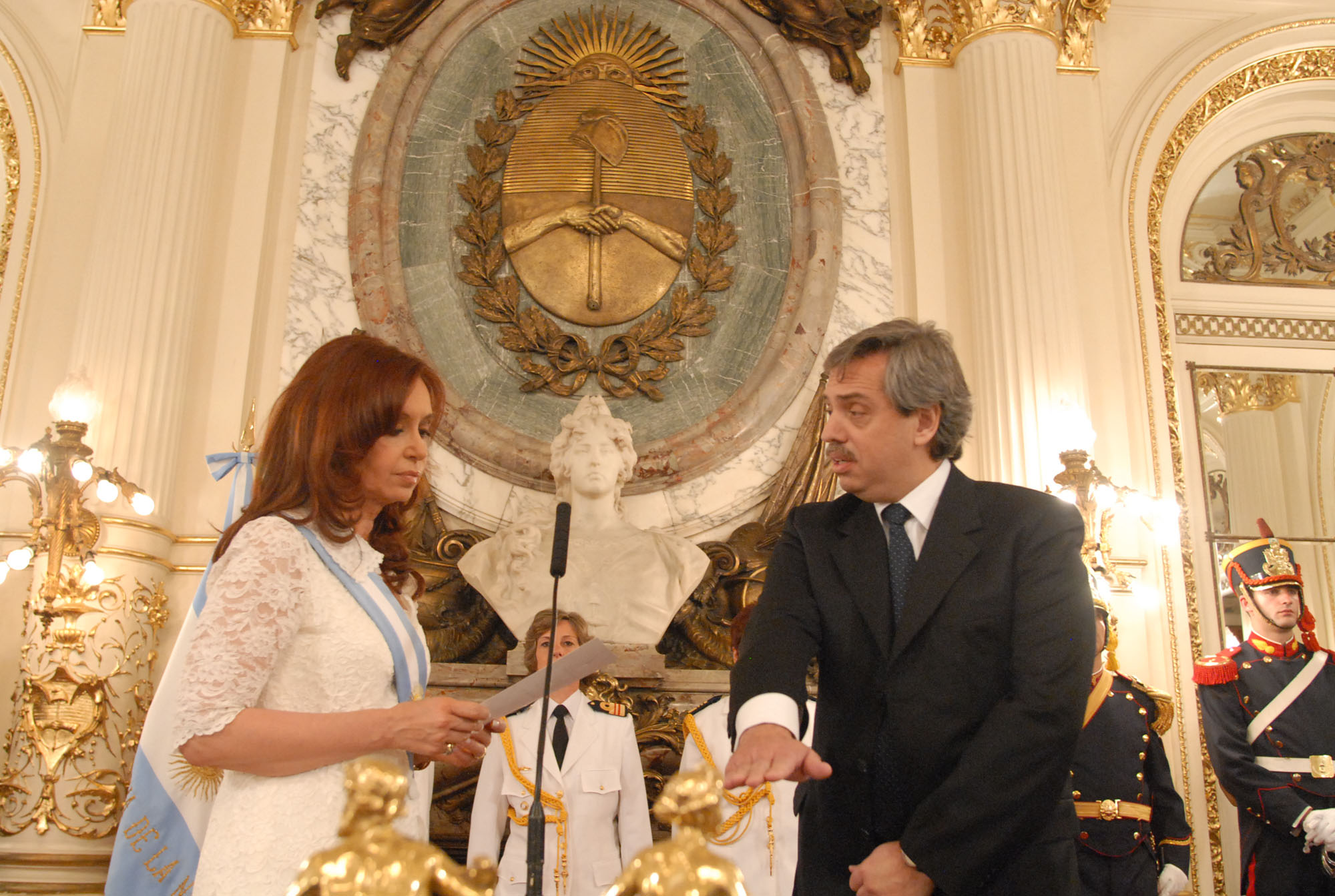
Fernández (right) took oath as the Chief of the Cabinet of Ministers under President Cristina Fernández de Kirchner on 10 December 2007

He gave up his seat when he was appointed Chief of the Cabinet of Ministers by President Néstor Kirchner upon taking office on 25 May 2003, and retained the same post under Kirchner's wife and successor, President Cristina Fernández de Kirchner, upon her election in 2007.

A new system of variable taxes on agricultural exports led to the 2008 Argentine government conflict with the agricultural sector, during which Fernández acted as the government's chief negotiator. The negotiations failed, however, and following Vice President Julio Cobos' surprise, tie-breaking vote against the bill in the Senate, Fernández resigned on 23 July 2008.

== Pre-presidency ==
He was named head of the City of Buenos Aires chapter of the Justicialist Party, but minimized his involvement in Front for Victory campaigns for Congress in 2009. Fernández actively considered seeking the Justicialist Party presidential nomination ahead of the 2011 general elections. He ultimately endorsed President Cristina Kirchner for re-election, however. He was campaign manager of the presidential candidacy of Sergio Massa in 2015.

== Presidential elections ==
=== Presidential campaign ===
On 18 May 2019, Cristina Fernández de Kirchner announced that Fernández would be a candidate for president, and that she would run for vice president alongside him, hosting his first campaign rally with Santa Cruz Governor Alicia Kirchner, sister-in-law of the former Kirchner.

About a month later, seeking to broaden his appeal to moderates, Fernández struck a deal with Sergio Massa to form an alliance called Frente de Todos, wherein Massa would be offered a role within a potential Fernández administration, or be given a key role within the Chamber of Deputies in exchange for dropping out of the presidential race and offering his support. Fernández also earned the endorsement of the General Confederation of Labor, receiving their support in exchange for promising that he will boost the economy, and that there will be no labor reform.

=== General elections ===
On 11 August 2019, Fernández won first place in the 2019 primary elections, earning 47.7% of the vote, compared to incumbent President Mauricio Macri's 31.8%. Fernández thereafter held a press conference where he said he called Macri to say that he would help Macri complete his term and "bring calm to society and markets", and that his economic proposals do not run the risk of defaulting on the national debt.

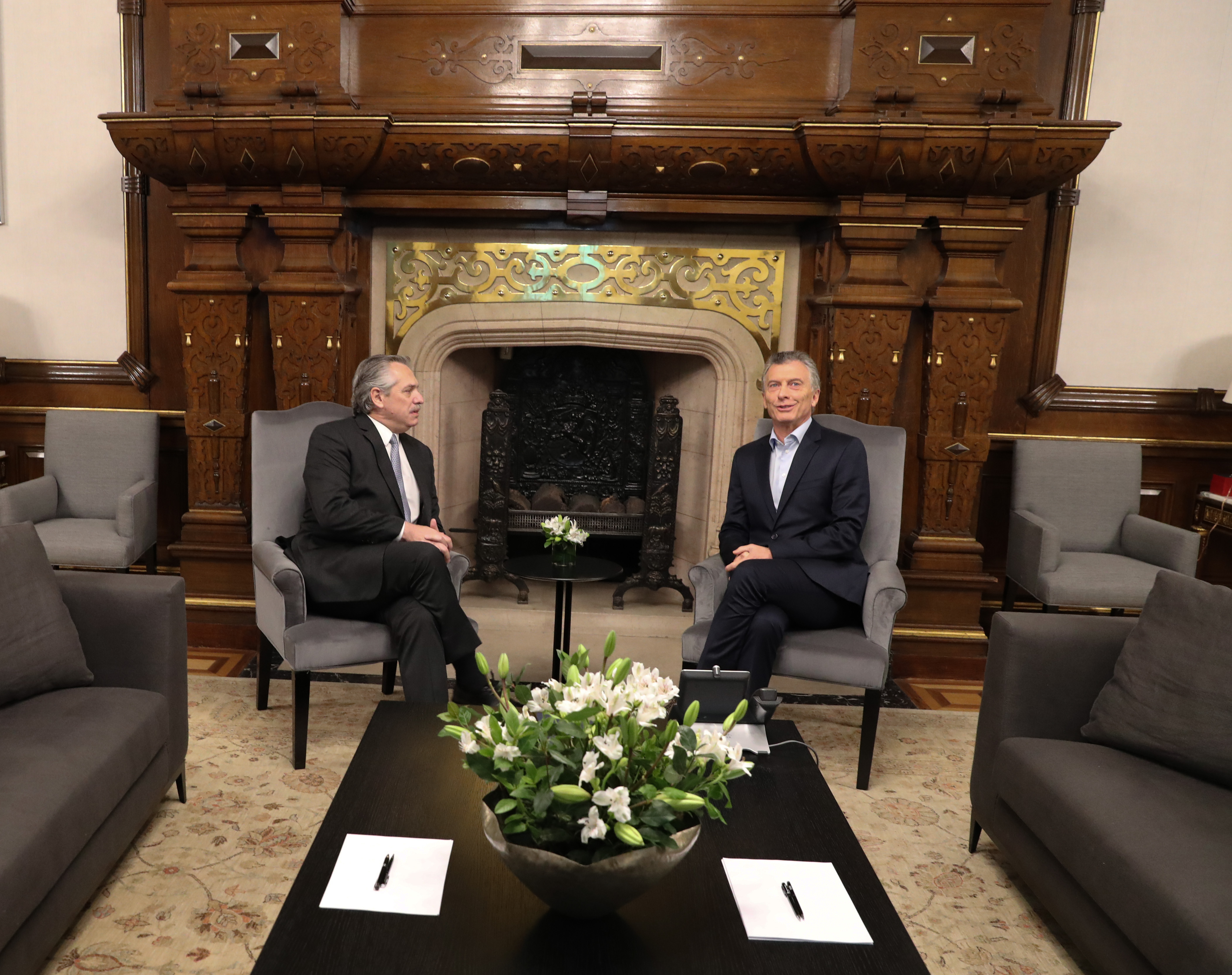
President-elect Fernández meets with outgoing President Macri following national elections that took place the previous day

In the 27 October general election, Fernández won the presidency by attaining 48.1% of the vote to Macri's 40.4%, exceeding the threshold required to win without the need for a ballotage. In Argentina, a presidential candidate can win outright by either garnering at least 45 percent of the vote, or winning 40 percent of the vote while being 10 points ahead of his or her nearest challenger. He owed his victory mainly to carrying Buenos Aires Province by over 1.6 million votes, accounting for almost all of his nationwide margin of 2.1 million votes. By comparison, Daniel Scioli only carried the country's largest province by 219,000 votes four years earlier.

== Presidency (2019–2023) ==
Presidential styles of Alberto Fernández
- Reference style: Excelentísimo Señor Presidente de la Nación (Most Excellent President of the Nation)
- Spoken style: Presidente de la Nación (President of the Nation)
- Alternative style: Señor Presidente (Mister President)

=== Inauguration ===
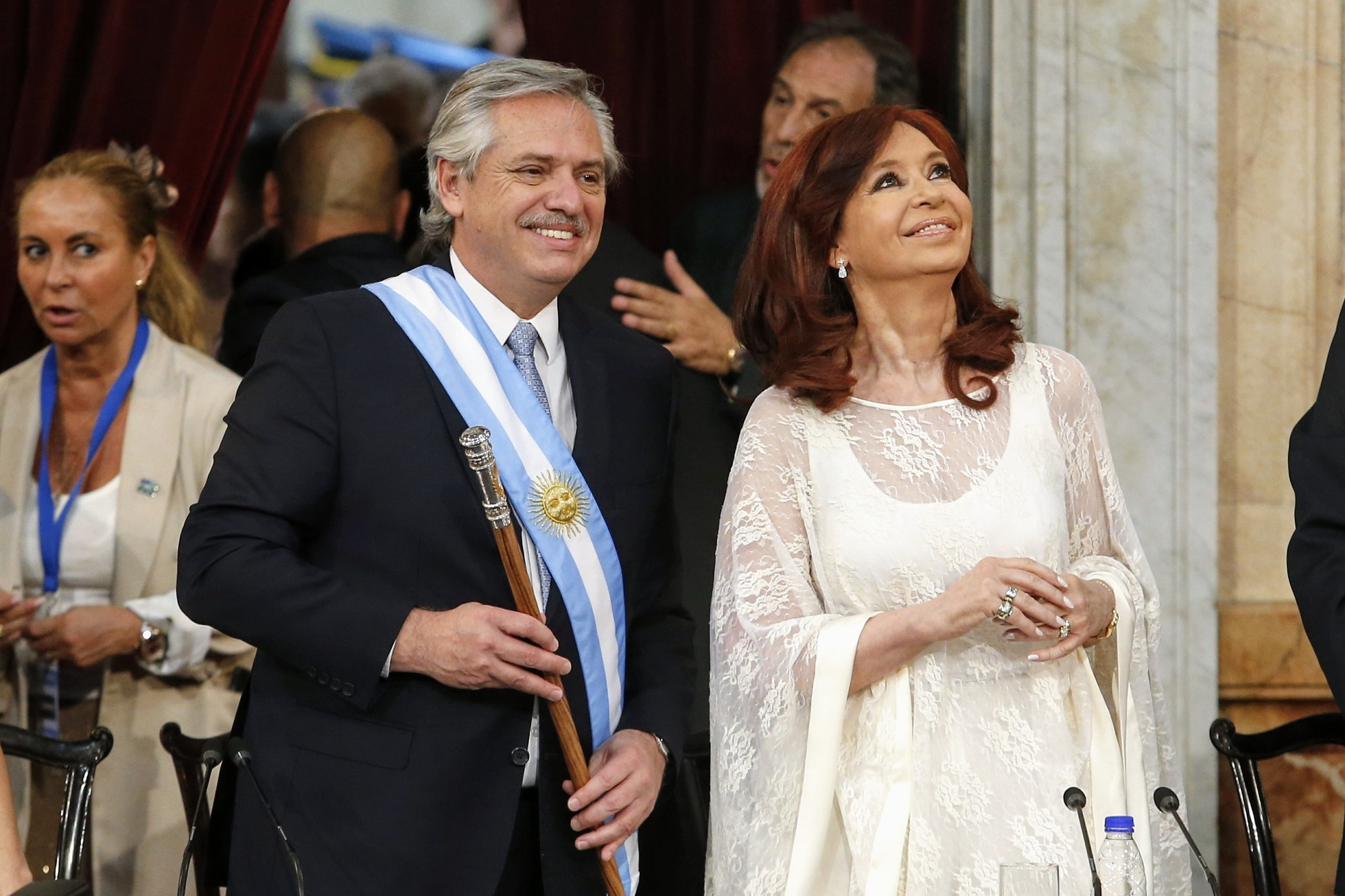
President Alberto Fernández (left) with his Vice President Cristina Fernández de Kirchner (right)

Fernández was sworn in on 10 December 2019.

=== Economic policy ===
On 14 December, the government established by decree the emergency in occupational matters and double compensation for dismissal without just cause for six months.

His first legislative initiative, the Social Solidarity and Productive Recovery Bill, was passed by Congress on 23 December. The bill includes tax hikes on foreign currency purchases, agricultural exports, wealth, and car sales - as well as tax incentives for production. Amid the worst recession in nearly two decades, it provided a 180-day freeze on utility rates, bonuses for the nation's retirees and Universal Allocation per Child beneficiaries, and food cards to two million of Argentina's poorest families. It also gave the president additional powers to renegotiate debt terms – with Argentina seeking to restructure its US$100 billion debt with private bondholders and US$45 billion borrowed by Macri from the International Monetary Fund. As the capital controls stayed in effect and with no prospect of being removed, the country was degraded from emerging market to standalone market by MSCI.

Organizations of the agricultural sector, including Sociedad Rural Argentina, CONINAGRO, Argentine Agrarian Federation and Argentine Rural Confederations, rejected the increase in taxes on agricultural exports. Despite these conflicts, Fernández announced the three-point increase in withholding tax on soybeans on the day of the opening of the regular sessions, on 1 March and generated major problems in the relationship between the government and the agricultural sector.

Argentina defaulted again on 22 May 2020 by failing to pay $500 million on its due date to its creditors. Negotiations for the restructuring of $66 billion of its debt continue. The International Monetary Fund reported that the COVID-19 crisis would plunge Argentina's GDP by 9.9 percent, after the country's economy contracted by 5.4 percent in first quarter of 2020, with unemployment rising over 10.4 percent in the first three months of the year, before the lockdown started. On 4 August, Fernández reached an accord with the biggest creditors on terms for a restructuring of $65bn in foreign bonds, after a breakthrough in talks that had at times looked close to collapse since the country's ninth debt default in May. On 22 September, as part of the economic impact of the COVID-19 pandemic, official reports showed a 19% year-on-year drop in the GDP for the second quarter of 2020, the biggest drop in the country's history. Investment went down 38% from the previous year. The poverty rate rose to 42% in the second half of 2020, the highest since 2004. Child poverty reached the 57.7% of minors of 14 years.

=== Social policy ===
On 31 December 2019, Fernández announced that he would send a bill in 2020 to discuss the legalization of abortion, ratified his support for its approval, and expressed his wish for "sensible debate". However, in June 2020, he stated that he was "attending to more urgent matters" (referring to the COVID-19 pandemic, as well as the debt restructuring), and that "he'll send the bill at some point". In November 2020, Fernández's legal secretary, Vilma Ibarra, confirmed that the government would be sending a new bill for the legalization of abortion to the National Congress that month. The Executive sent the bill, alongside another bill oriented towards women's health care (the "1000 Days Plan"), on 17 November 2020. The bill was passed by the Senate, legalizing abortion in Argentina, on 30 December 2020.

On 1 March, he also announced a restructuring of the Federal Intelligence Agency (AFI), including the publications of its accounts - which had been made secret by Macri in a 2016 decree. The AFI had been criticized for targeting public figures for political purposes.

On 17 August, protests took place in many cities across Argentina against measures taken by Fernández, primarily the Justice Reform Bill his government had sent to the Congress, but also, among other causes: for the "defense of institutions" and "separation of powers", against the government's quarantine measures, the perceived lack of liberty and the increase in crime, and a raise on state pensions.

On 4 September 2020, Fernández signed a Necessity and Urgency Decree (Decreto 721/2020) establishing a 1% employment quota for trans and travesti people in the national public sector. The measure had been previously debated in the Chamber of Deputies as various prospective bills. The decree mandates that at any given point, at least 1% of all public sector workers in the national government must be transgender, as understood in the 2012 Gender Identity Law.

On 20 July 2021, Fernández signed another Necessity and Urgency Decree (Decreto 476/2021) mandating the National Registry of Persons (RENAPER) to allow a third gender option on all national identity cards and passports, marked as an "X". The measure applies to non-citizen permanent residents who possess Argentine identity cards as well. In compliance with the 2012 Gender Identity Law, this made Argentina one of the few countries in the world to legally recognize non-binary gender on all official documentation.

On 12 November 2020 Fernández signed a decree legalizing the self-cultivation and regulating the sales and subsidized access of medical cannabis, expanding upon a 2017 bill that legalized the use and research of the plant and its derivatives. In June 2019, during his presidential campaign, he had signaled his intention to legalize marijuana for recreational purposes, but not other types of drugs.

=== Foreign relations ===
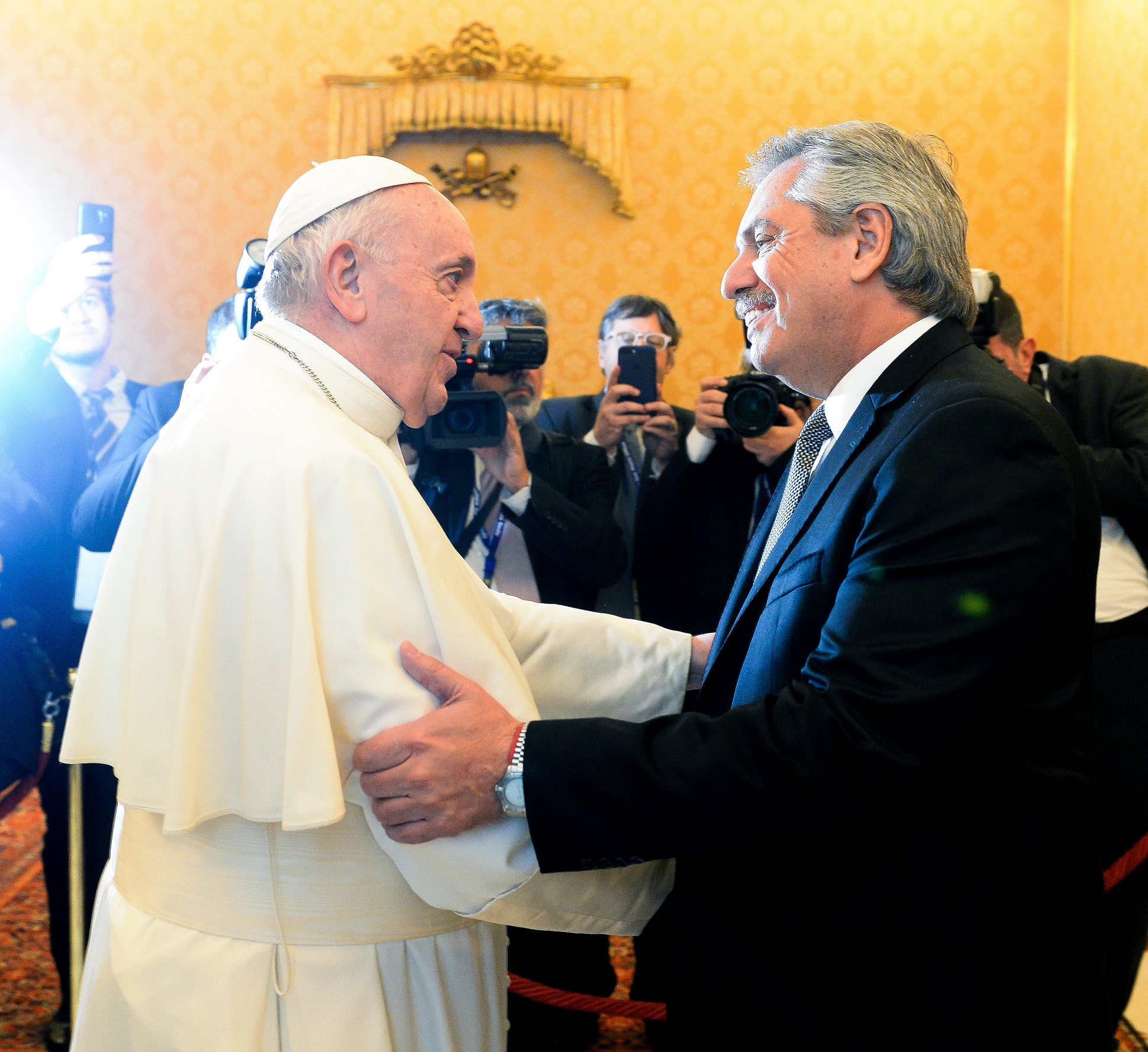
Meeting with Pope Francis on 31 January 2020

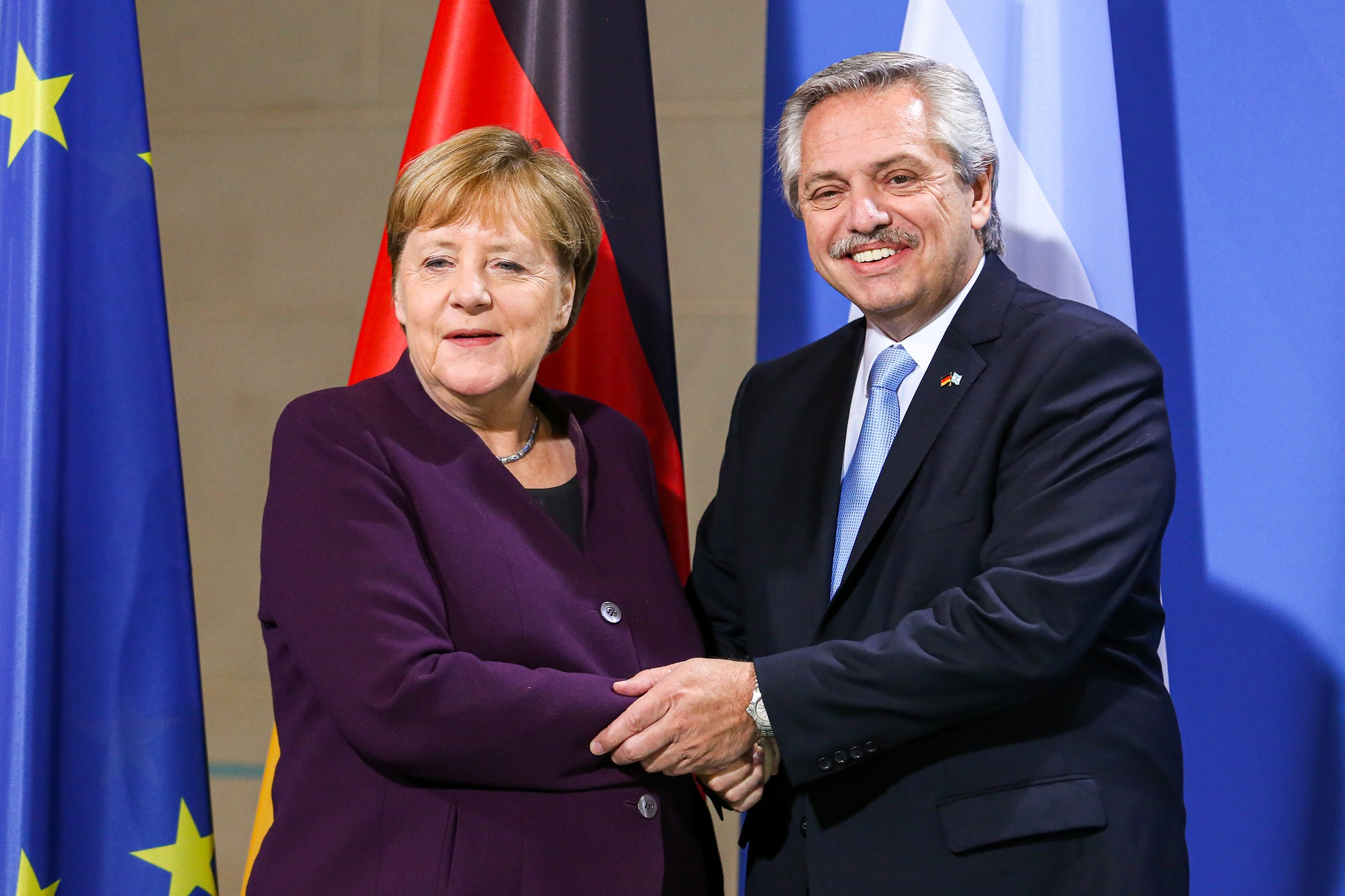
Fernández with German Chancellor Angela Merkel in Berlin, February 2020

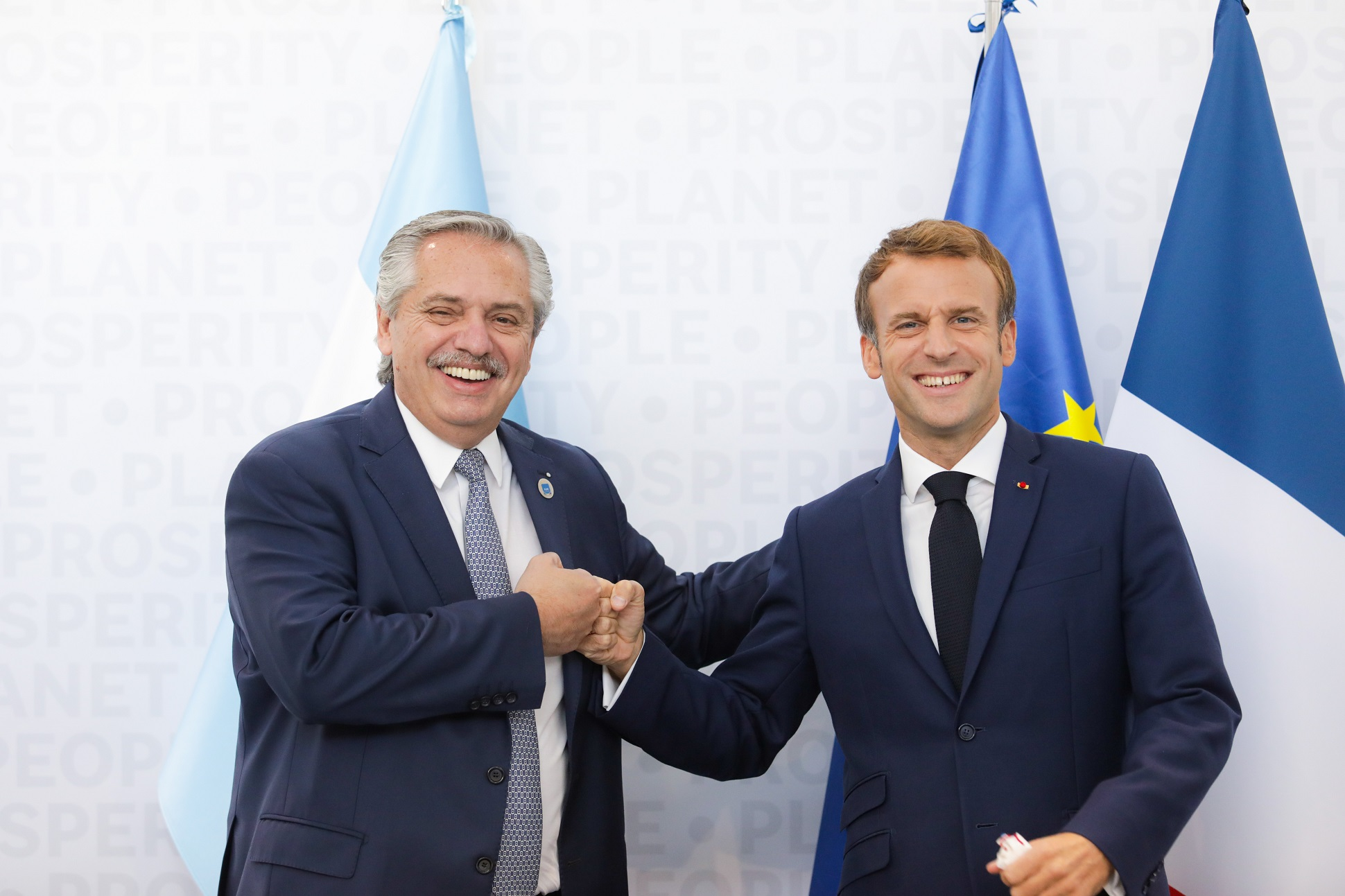
Fernández with French President Emmanuel Macron at the 2021 G20 Rome summit in October 2021

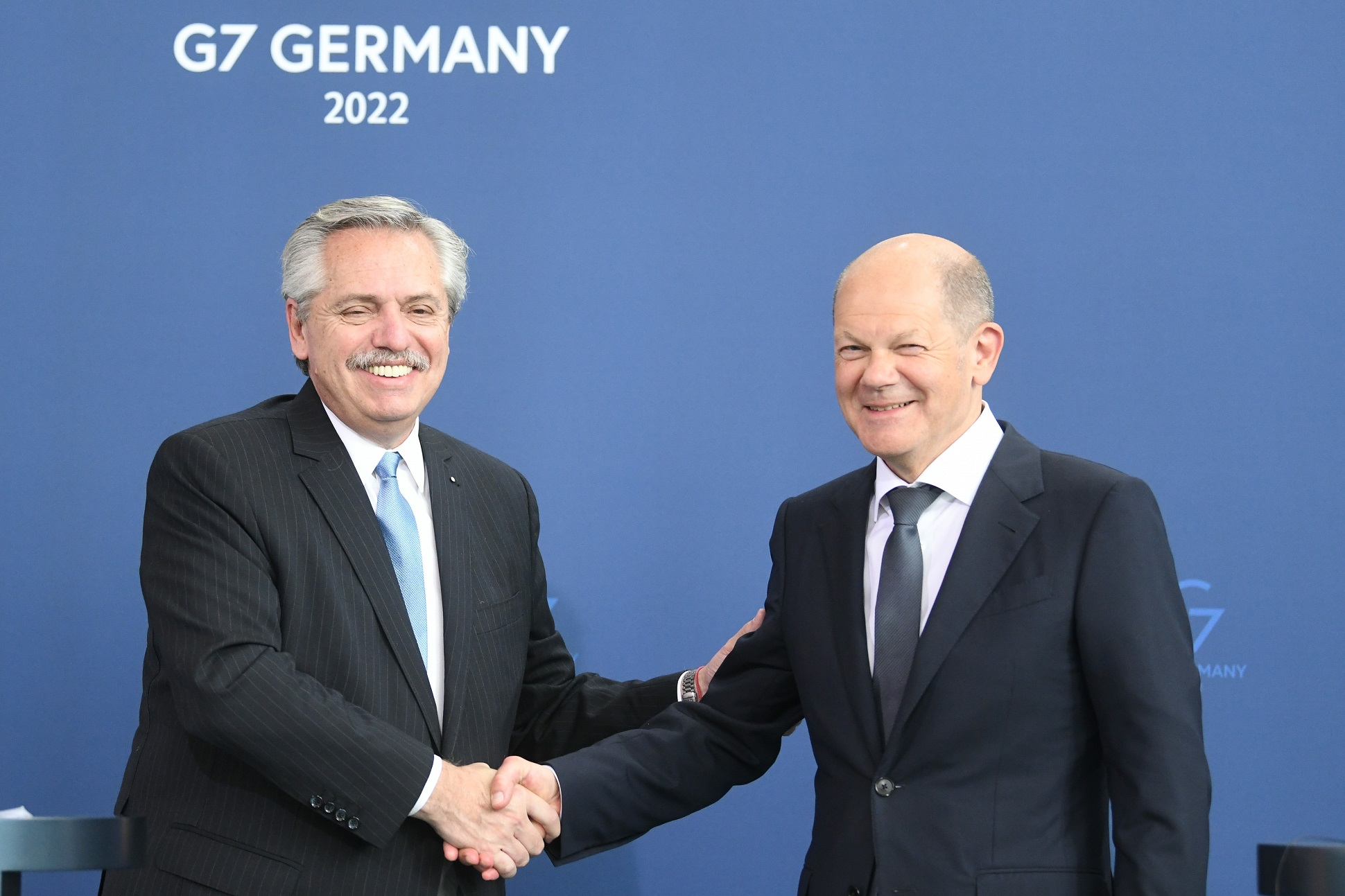
Fernández with German Chancellor Olaf Scholz in Berlin, May 2022

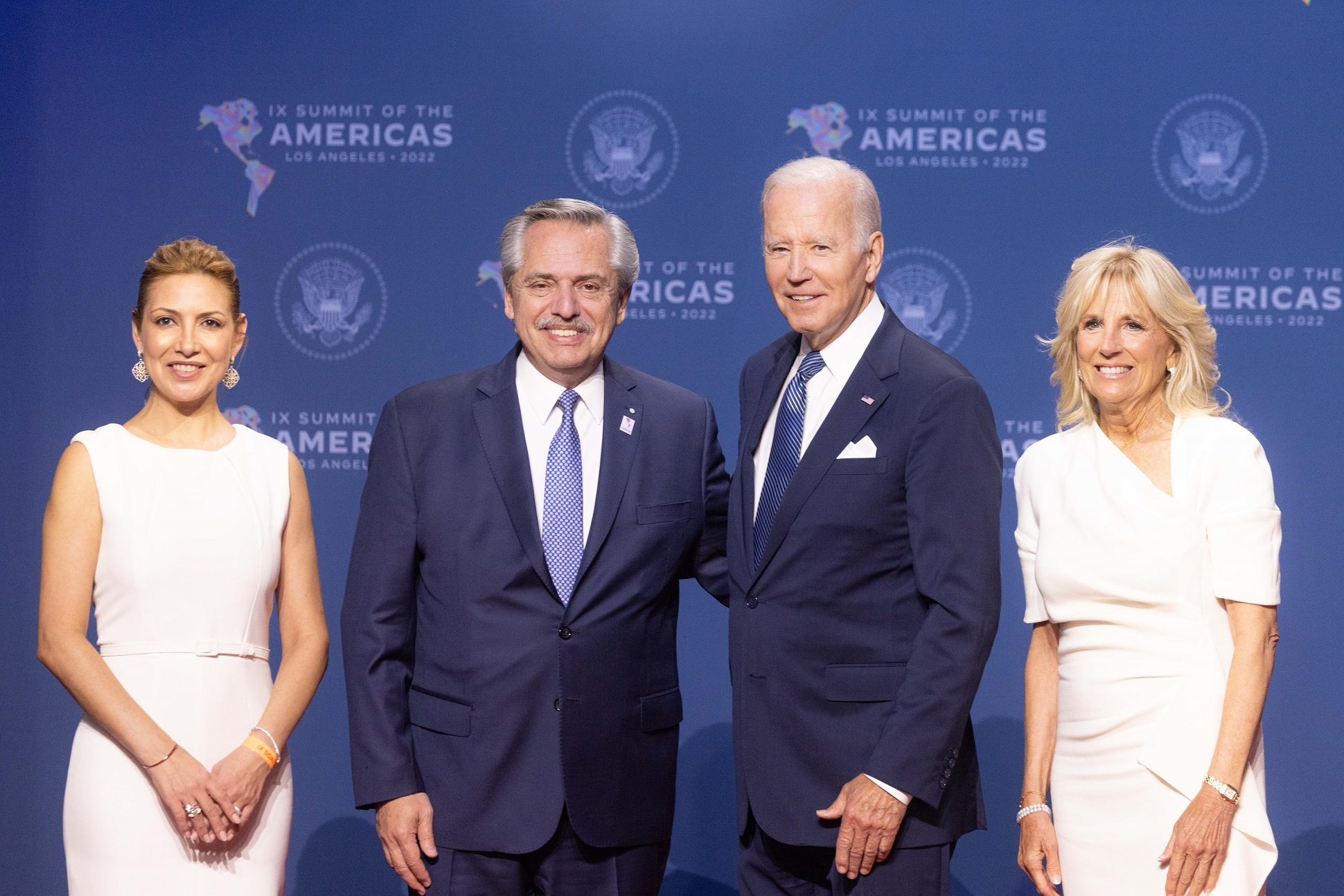
Fernández and Fabiola Yáñez with U.S. President Joe Biden and Jill Biden at the 9th Summit of the Americas in 2022

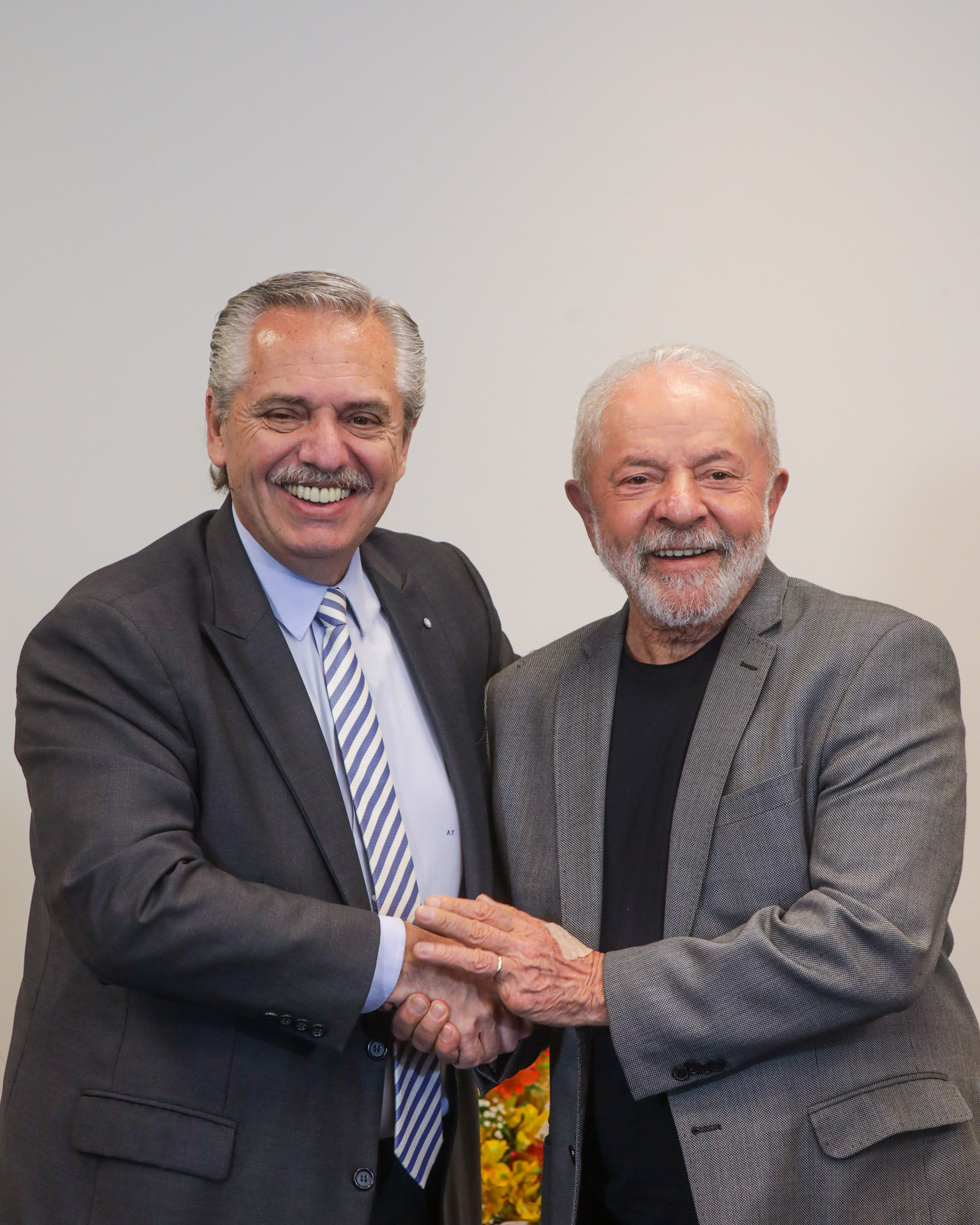
Fernández with then-President-elect of Brazil Luiz Inácio Lula da Silva in November 2022

During his administration, Argentina's relationship with Brazil became somewhat strained. Brazilian president Jair Bolsonaro refused to attend Fernández's inauguration, accusing him of wanting to create a "great Bolivarian homeland" on the border and of preparing to provoke a flight of capital and companies into Brazil. Fernández and Bolsonaro had their first conversation through a video conference on 30 November 2020, during which both presidents agreed on the importance of cooperation and the role of Mercosur.

U.S. President Donald Trump's top adviser for the Western Hemisphere, Mauricio Claver-Carone, crossed Fernández in 2019 saying: "We want to know if Alberto Fernández will be a defender of democracy or an apologist for dictatorships and leaders in the region, whether it be Maduro, Correa or Morales."

Under Fernández, Argentina has retired in the Lima Group formed by North and South American nations to address the crisis in Venezuela, after not subscribing to any of the Group's statements and resolutions. Argentina voted in favor of the United Nations resolution to back the continuity of the UN Human Rights Office report on human rights violations in Venezuela. Under Fernández, Argentina withdrew recognition of Juan Guaidó as interim President of Venezuela. In January 2020, the Fernández administration revoked Elisa Trotta Gamus credentials, who was Guaidó's envoy to Argentina and whose representation had been approved by the Macri administration. However, Fernández also refused to recognize Maduro's envoy Stella Lugo's credentials and Foreign Minister Felipe Solá asked her to return to Caracas.

Alberto Fernández questioned the conclusions the Organization of American States that the reelection of Evo Morales was unconstitutional for electoral fraud. Fernández's government recognized Morales as the legitimate President of Bolivia, and granted him asylum in Argentina in December 2019. On 9 November 2020, with Luis Arce's victory in 2020, Fernández personally accompanied Morales to the Argentine border with Bolivia, wherein the two leaders held a public act celebrating Morales's return to his home country.

In January 2020, Fernández traveled to Israel for his first presidential trip abroad. There he paid respects to the victims of the Holocaust and maintained a bilateral meeting with Prime Minister Benjamin Netanyahu who thanked him for keeping Hezbollah branded as a terrorist organization, a measure taken by former President Mauricio Macri.

Regarding Argentina's strained relations with Iran, Fernández publicly defended the Memorandum of understanding between Argentina and Iran, although critical of this prior to taking office. In September 2020, Fernández asked Iran before the UN General Assembly to "cooperate with the Argentine justice" to bring justice to the cause and extradite those Iranian officials who stand accused of the attack. He further stated that if the officials were to be found innocent, "they could freely return to Iran or otherwise face the consequences for their actions."

Alberto Fernández has developed close ties with China and visited Beijing during the 2022 Winter Olympics, where China expressed support for Argentina's sovereignty over the Falkland Islands.

In January 2022, Fernández was elected president pro tempore of the Community of Latin American and Caribbean States (CELAC), succeeding Mexico's Andrés Manuel López Obrador.

In February 2022, Russia invaded Ukraine in a major escalation of the Russo-Ukrainian War. Fernández condemned the invasion and called on Russia to end military actions in Ukraine. At the UN, Argentina voted to condemn the Russian invasion and demanded a full withdrawal of Russian forces from Ukraine. In July 2022, Fernández stated further support to Ukraine in a phone conversation with Ukrainian president Volodymyr Zelenskyy, to whom he promised to deliver more humanitarian aid to Ukraine. Fernández rejected sanctions against Russia and did not want to send weapons to Ukraine.

In September 2023, Fernández condemned Azerbaijan for the blockade of the Lachin corridor and urged the international community to "act preemptively" to avoid "new persecutions" of ethnic Armenians in Nagorno-Karabakh.

=== Position during COVID-19 pandemic and measures ===
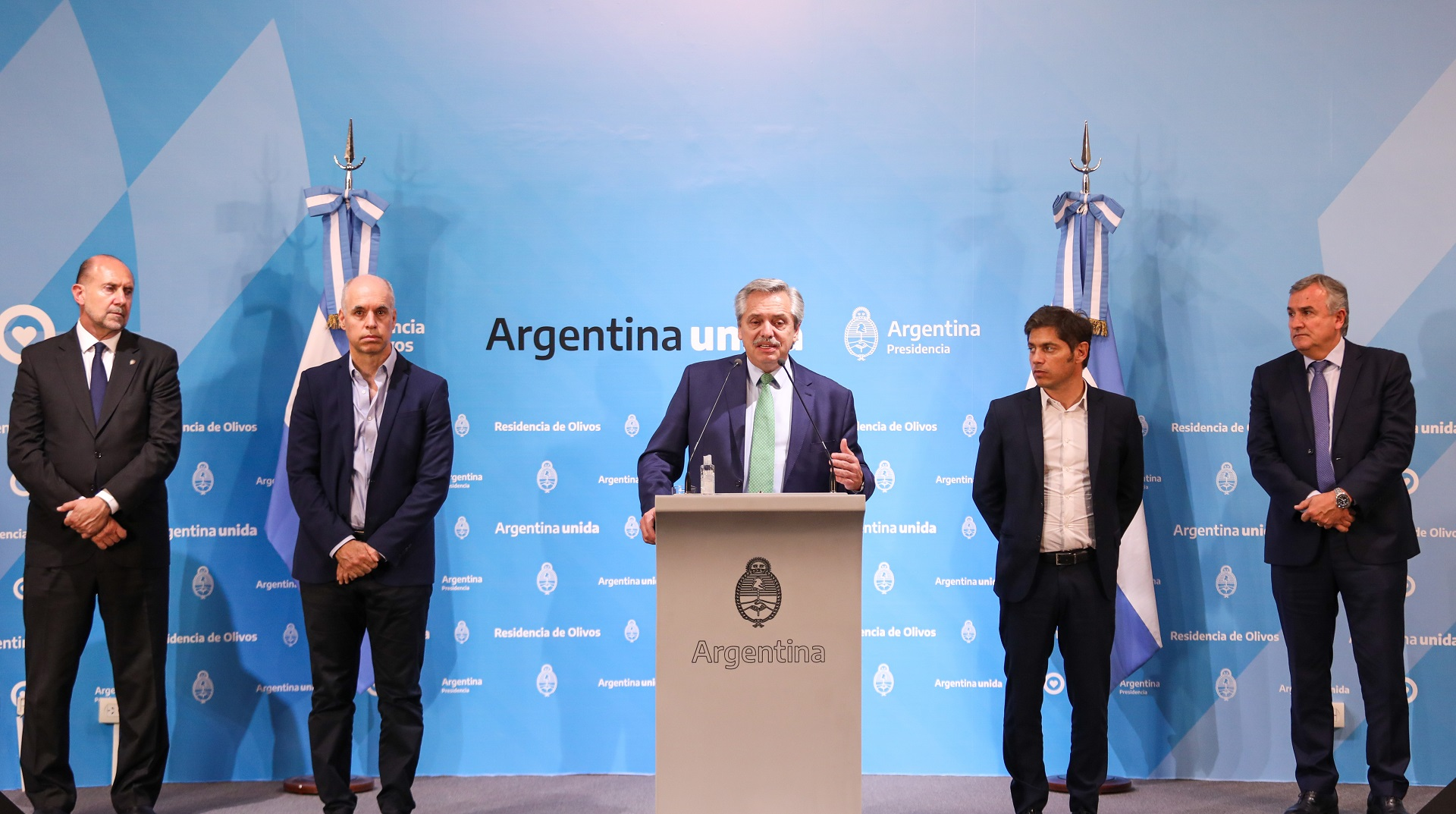
The announcement of the lockdown by Fernández was generally well received, although there were concerns with its economic impact.

During the COVID-19 pandemic, Fernandez's government announced a country-wide lockdown, in effect from 20 March until 31 March, later extended until 12 April. The lockdown was further renewed on 27 April, 11 May, 25 May, 8 June, 1 July, 18 July, 3 August, 17 August, 31 August and 21 September, and included several measures including travel, transport and citizen movement restrictions, stay-at-home orders, store closures and reduced operating hours.

Responses to the outbreak have included restrictions on commerce and movement, closure of borders, and the closure of schools and educational institutions. The announcement of the lockdown was generally well received, although there were concerns with its economic impact in the already delicate state of Argentina's economy, with analysts predicting at least 3% GDP decrease in 2020. Fernandez later announced a 700 billion pesos (US$11.1 billion) stimulus package, worth 2% of the country's GDP. After announced a mandatory quarantine to every person that returned to Argentina from highly affected countries, the government closed its borders, ports, and suspended flights.

On 23 March, Fernández asked the Chinese president Xi Jinping for 1,500 ventilators as Argentina had only 8,890 available.

Included in the package was the announcement of a one-time emergency payment of 10,000 pesos (US$152, as of 20 March) to lower-income individuals whose income was affected by the lockdown, including retirees. Because banks were excluded in the list of businesses that were considered essential in Fernandez's lockdown decree, they remained closed until the Central Bank announced banks would open during a weekend starting on 3 April.

Due to Argentina's notoriously low level of banking penetration, many Argentines, particularly retirees, do not possess bank accounts and are used to withdraw funds and pensions in cash. The decision to open banks for only three days on a reduced-hours basis sparked widespread outrage as hundreds of thousands of retirees (coronavirus' highest risk group) flocked to bank branches in order to withdraw their monthly pension and emergency payment.

Due to the national lockdown, the economic activity suffered a collapse of nearly 10% in March 2020 according to a consultant firm. The highest drop was of the construction sector (32%) versus March 2019. Every economic sector suffered a collapse, with finance, commerce, manufacturing industry and mining being the most affected. The agriculture sector was the least affected, but overall the economic activity for the first trimester of 2020 accumulates a 5% contraction. It is expected that the extension of the lockdown beyond April would increase the collapse of the Argentinian economy. In March, the primary fiscal deficit jumped to US$1,394 million, an 857% increase year-to-year. This was due to the public spending to combat the pandemic and the drop in tax collection due to low activity in a context of social isolation. Schools were closed for over a year, and it is estimated that 1.5 million of kids abandoned school, 13% of the total.

Despite the government's hard lockdown policy, Fernández has been harshly criticized for not following the appropriate protocols himself. This included traveling throughout the country, taking pictures with large groups of supporters without properly wearing a mask nor respecting social distancing, and holding social gatherings with union leaders.

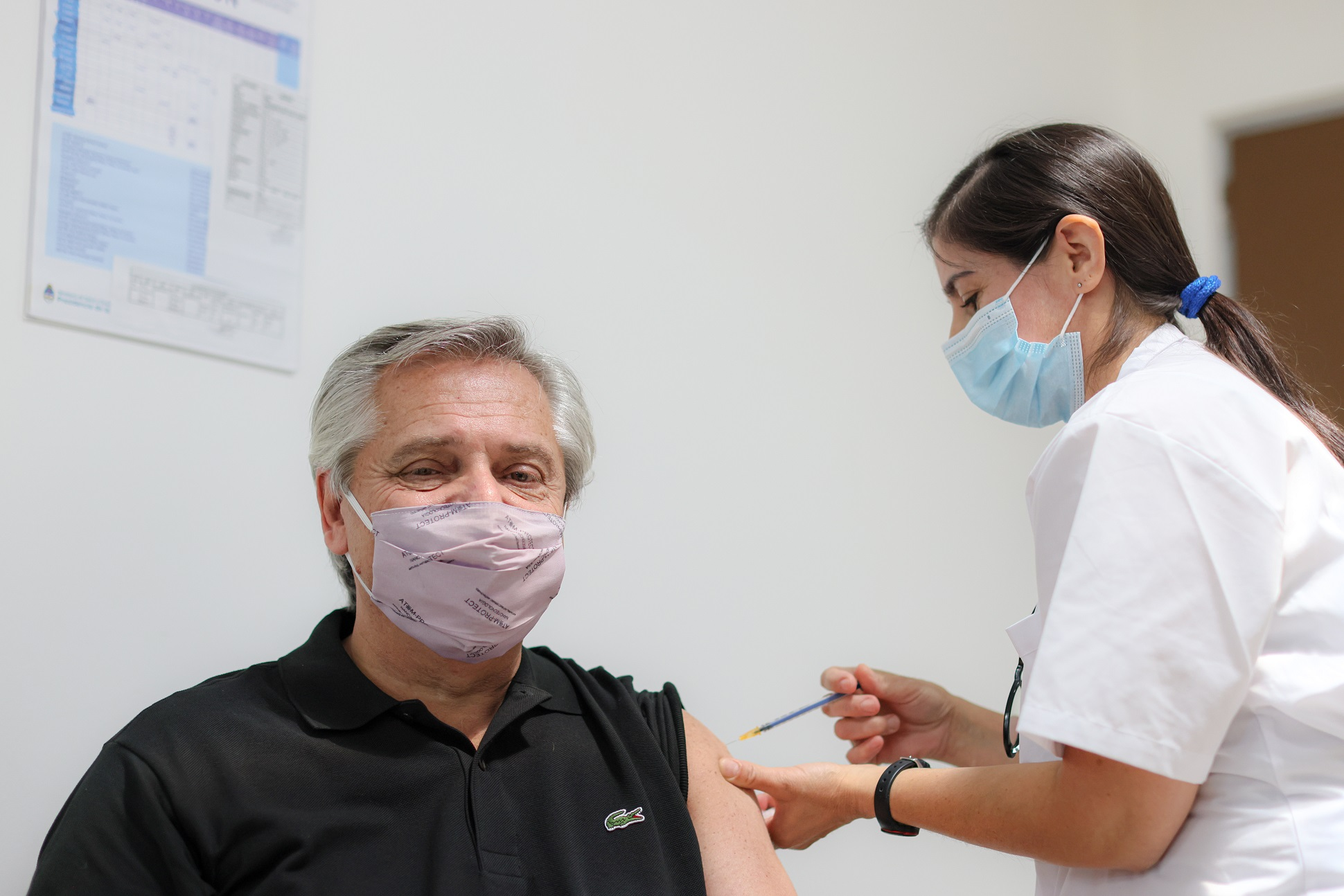
Fernández receiving the first dose of the Sputnik V vaccine against COVID-19 on 21 January 2021

On 3 September, despite most local governments still enforcing strict lockdown measures, Fernández stated that "there is no lockdown", and that such thoughts had "been instilled by the opposition", as part of a political agenda. Fernández eased some lockdown measures in the Greater Buenos Aires on 6 November 2020, shifting to a "social distancing" phase.

On 21 January 2021, Fernández became the first Latin American leader to be inoculated against the disease via the recently approved Gam-COVID-Vac (better known as Sputnik V). On 7 December 2021, Fernández received his booster dose of the vaccine.

Ginés González García was forced to resign as Health Minister on 19 February 2021 after it was revealed he provided preferential treatment for the COVID-19 vaccine to his close friends, including journalist Horacio Verbitsky and other political figures. He was succeeded by the second in charge Carla Vizzotti. The revelation was met with wide national condemnation from supporters and opposition, as Argentina had at the time received only 1.5 million doses of vaccine for its population of 40 million.

Fernández tested positive for the COVID-19 on 2 April 2021 having a "light fever".

=== Justicialist Party chairmanship ===
On 22 March 2021, Fernández was elected by the national congress of the Justicialist Party as the party's new national chairman, succeeding José Luis Gioja. Fernández ran unopposed, heading the Unidad y Federalismo list, which received the support of diverse sectors in the Peronist movement, including La Cámpora.

=== Midterm elections 2021 ===
Confirming the trend of that year's primary elections, the Frente de Todos suffered major losses in the November 2021 legislative elections. The FDT lost its majority in the Senate (the first time in nearly 40 years that Peronists lost control of the upper house), and the opposition Juntos por el Cambio coalition gained the upper hand in traditional peronist strongholds, such as La Pampa and Santa Cruz. Observers attributed the loss to the widespread anger over high inflation and rising poverty. The reduced pluralities in both houses of Congress meaning the government will now have to engage in negotiations to pass any initiative requiring legislative approval.

== Controversies ==
=== Allegations of racism ===
On 9 June 2021, Fernández was at a meeting with business leaders alongside Spanish Prime Minister Pedro Sánchez at the Casa Rosada. When he sought to play up the Argentinian ties with Europe, he said "The Mexicans came from the Indians, the Brazilians came from the jungle, but we Argentines came from the ships. And they were ships that came from Europe." Fernández erroneously attributed the quote to the Mexican poet, essayist and diplomat Octavio Paz, although it had originated from lyrics by local musician and personal friend Litto Nebbia. Faced with the negative backlash to his comments, on the same day Fernández apologized on Twitter and the next day sent a letter to the director of the National Institute Against Discrimination, Xenophobia and Racism (INADI), clarifying his comments.

=== Violations of COVID-19 rules ===
In August 2021, it was revealed that there had been numerous visits to the presidential palace during the lockdown that he had imposed in early 2020 due to the COVID-19 pandemic; visitors included an actress, a dog trainer, and a hairdresser, as well as hosting a birthday party for the First Lady.

=== Rejection of a Supreme Court ruling ===
In December 2022, Fernandez sparked a battle with the Supreme Court of Argentina and a legal crisis after he said he would reject a ruling it made to give a larger proportion of state funds to the city of Buenos Aires. In a ruling the Supreme Court said the level of funds to Buenos Aires should be raised from 1.4% of the total pool of funds to 2.95% after it was cut by government decree during the COVID-19 pandemic in 2020. He said the ruling was unjustified and pledged to ignore it; "it is an unprecedented, incongruous, and impossible-to-enforce ruling", calling the decision politically motivated ahead of general elections next year and adding that it would hurt the other provinces. His remarks sparked off a backlash, with critics saying the rejection of a Supreme Court decision set a dangerous precedent and undermined the justice system, while several provincial governors sided with Fernandez and criticized the court ruling. Buenos Aires city mayor Horacio Rodríguez Larreta, criticized the declaration of Fernandez, saying; "the president decided to break the constitutional order, completely violate the rule of law and attack democracy." Various industry groups criticized the move as dangerous to the rule of law.

=== Other controversies ===
Fernández has engaged in disputes with users on Twitter before his presidency, in which his reactions have been regarded as aggressive or violent by some. Tweets show him responding to other users with expletives such as "pelotudo" (Argentinian slang for "asshole"), "pajero" ("wanker"), and "hijo de puta" ("son of a bitch"); he also called presidential candidate José Luis Espert "Pajert", a word play between his last name and the Argentine slang for "wanker". In December 2017, he responded to a female user by saying, "Girl, what you think doesn't worry me. You better learn how to cook. Maybe then you can do something right. Thinking is not your strong suit".

In June 2020, he told journalist Cristina Pérez to "go read the Constitution", after being questioned about his attempts to install a government-designated administration in the Vicentín agricultural conglomerate.

In a 2017 interview for the Netflix mini-series Nisman: The Prosecutor, the President, and the Spy, Fernández stated that "To this day, I doubt that [Nisman] committed suicide"; however, after he became president in 2020, Fernández reportedly said, "I am convinced that it was a suicide, after doubting it a lot, I am not going to lie." He was referring to Alberto Nisman, a prosecutor investigating Fernández's vice president Cristina Fernández de Kirchner for her suspected cover-up of Iran's participation in the 1994 AMIA bombing. Nisman accused Fernández de Kirchner of secretly negotiating with Iranian officials to cover up their complicity in the attack in exchange for oil to reduce Argentina's energy deficit. Officially, the agreement called for the exchange of Argentinian grain for Iranian oil. Nisman was found dead in his apartment on 18 January 2015, only hours before he was scheduled to present his report to Congress.

== Post-presidency (2023–present) ==
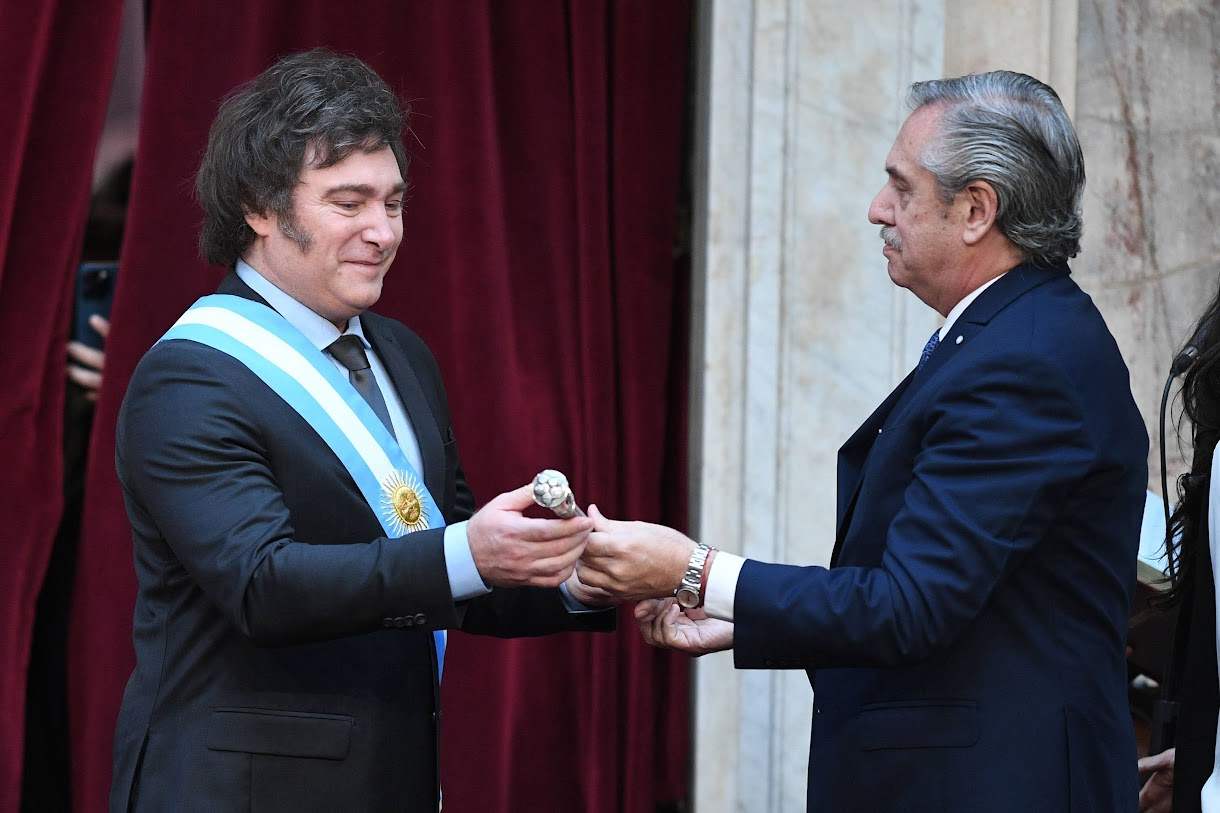
Alberto Fernández hands government to Javier Milei during his inauguration

Alberto Fernández was invited by the National Electoral Council of Venezuela to be an observer of the 2024 Venezuelan presidential election. Before leaving he was interviewed by Radio con Vos. He said "If Maduro is defeated, what he has to do is to accept it. As Lula said (n: the president of Brazil, Lula da Silva), who wins, wins, and who loses, loses. Period. The end. Democracy is like that. I'm not going to legalize anyone, but do as asked, be an observer in the elections so everything works out smoothly". The following day he was called by the presidency of Venezuela and told not to travel, as his words would suggest that he was not going to be an impartial observer.

Fernández stepped down as president of the Justicialist Party after several photos that allegedly showed the injuries that Fabiola Yáñez suffered after being physically abused by him were published by Infobae. He has also been accused of "sexual violence" as he forced Yáñez into having an abortion in 2016. On 14 August 2024, Fernández was indicted on charges of domestic abuse against Yáñez.

== Personal life ==
Fernández married Marcela Luchetti, a fellow University of Buenos Aires law student, in 1993. They separated in 2005. Fernández and Luchetti have a single child, drag queen Dyhzy.

From 2014 to 2024, Fernández was in a relationship with journalist and stage actress Fabiola Yáñez, who fulfilled the role of First Lady of Argentina during Fernández's presidency. The couple owns three dogs: Dylan (named after Bob Dylan, whom Fernández has praised and cited as an inspiration) and two of Dylan's puppies, Prócer and Kaila. On 23 September 2021, the presidential office's medical unit announced Yáñez was expecting her first child. Yáñez and Fernández's son, Francisco Fernández Yáñez, was born on 11 April 2022 at Sanatorio Otamendi, in Buenos Aires. On 6 August 2024, Yáñez accused Fernández of domestic abuse during their tenure as president and first lady respectively; Fernández denied the allegations. An Argentine court banned Fernández from leaving the country while the investigation is underway. On 14 August, the Argentine federal prosecutor's office requested the indictment of Alberto Fernandez for "assault and battery with aggravating circumstances".

Fernández is also an Honorary Professor of Tsinghua University. Fernández is a supporter of Argentinos Juniors' football team.

== Electoral history ==
=== Executive ===
Electoral history of Alberto Fernández
Election	Office	List	Votes			Result	Ref.
Election	Office	List	Total	%	P.	Result	Ref.
2019	President of Argentina	Frente de Todos	12,946,037	48.24%	1st	Elected	

=== Legislative ===
Electoral history of Alberto Fernández
Election	Office	List	#	District	Votes			Result	Ref.
Election	Office	List	#	District	Total	%	P.	Result	Ref.
2000	City Legislator	Encounter for the City	11	Buenos Aires	548,324	30.82%	2nd (Note: Presented on an electoral list. The data shown represents the share of the vote the entire party/alliance received in that constituency.)	Elected	

Government offices
Preceded by Diego Peluffo	Superintendent of Insurance; 1989–1995	Succeeded by Claudio Moroni
Political offices
Preceded by Alfredo Atanasof	Chief of the Cabinet of Ministers of Argentina; 2003–2008	Succeeded by Sergio Massa
Preceded by Mauricio Macri	President of Argentina; 2019–2023	Succeeded by Javier Milei
Party political offices
Preceded by Daniel Scioli	Justicialist Party nominee for President of Argentina; 2019	Succeeded by Sergio Massa
New political alliance	Frente de Todos nominee for President of Argentina; 2019	Alliance dissolved
Preceded by José Luis Gioja	President of the Justicialist Party; 2021–2024	Succeeded by Cristina Fernández de Kirchner
Diplomatic posts
Preceded by Andrés Manuel López Obrador	President pro tempore of CELAC; 2022–2023	Succeeded by Ralph Gonsalves
