= Hernán Rodríguez Matte =

Chilean screenwriter

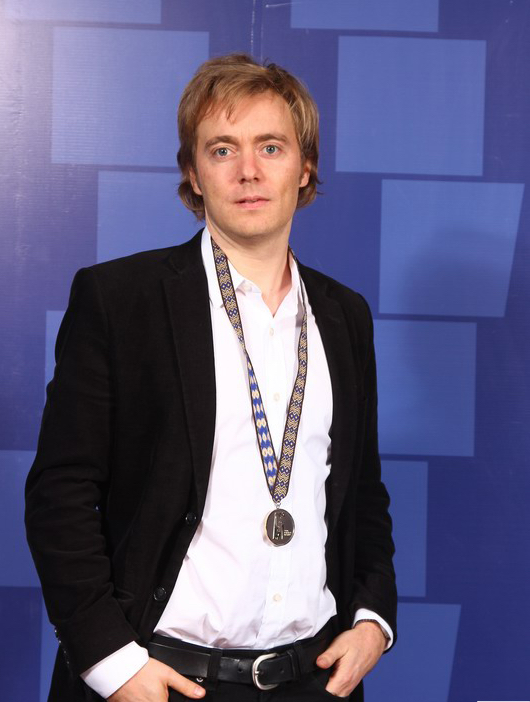
- Hernán Rodríguez Matte
- Born: May 16, 1972 (age 54); Santiago, Chile
- Education: American Film Institute
- Occupations: Author; director; screenwriter

Hernán Rodríguez Matte (Santiago, Chile, May 16, 1972) is a Chilean writer, director known for his literary work and his extensive work as a screenwriter for television. He is the author of the novel Barrio Alto and "La Vida Segun Benito". He is also the creator of the successful television shows ‘'La Colonia", "Welcome to Reality" and "Papá Mono", among others. He is also the founder of Radio Isla Negra, a global, multi-stream, listener-supported radio station.

== Biography ==
In 2000, he completed his MFA (Master in Screenwriting) at the prestigious American Film Institute in Los Angeles, and worked at Sony Pictures International Television adapting formats for the Hispanic market. One of the most successful formats was the creation and development of Bienvenida Realidad a television series commissioned by Sony Pictures. and acquired by TVN, Cadena 3, RCN, Sony Spin (US), Rede CNT Brasil and Teleamazonas Ecuador among others.

He had a prolific career as Head of Development and Showrunner for hit series such as "La Colonia", "El reemplazante", "El diario secreto de una profesional", "Casado con Hijos", "Tiempo Final", "La Nany", "Tres son Multitud", "Cartas de Mujer", "Manual de Galanes" among others . He was the creator of the successful sitcom "La Colonia", a comedy broadcast by Mega that quickly became the only Chilean sitcom sold abroad.

As Head of Development at TVN, he was the Showrunner for "El Reemplazante, Winner for "Best TV Series" and "Best Screenplay" at the Altazor Awards and Winner of the Circle of Art Critics Award. It was also awarded as "Best TV Show of the Decade" by El Copihue de Oro.

He is also the Creator and Executive Producer of the successful show Papá Mono, currently on Amazon Prime and reaching 32 share points on Network Television, Channel 13.
