= Naco (slang) =

Pejorative Mexican Spanish term

Naco (fem. naca) is a pejorative word often used in Mexican Spanish that may be translated into English as "low-class", "uncultured", "vulgar" or "uncivilized ".

A naco (Spanish: [ˈnako]) is usually associated with lower socio-economic classes. Although, it is used across all socioeconomic classes, when associated with middle - upper income people, it means “vulgar”, “bad taste”, "las de suchi", and “pretentious”.

== Definition and usage ==
The Cuban lexicographer Felix Ramos y Duarte, in his Diccionario de Mejicanísmos (1895), records the word for the first time. He explains it as usual in Tlaxcala (Mexico) and defines it with the following terms: "Indian dressed in blue cotton, white underpants and guaraches".

The term naco is generally used to describe people, behaviors or aesthetic choices seen as unrefined or unsophisticated, often in a comic way. As a person, the "naco" may display a general lack of refinement by adopting a "gangster mentality", unrefined verbal expressions or slang, peculiar accents, lack of social manners, or comically bad taste. The word likely originated as a contraction of "totonaco" referring to the members of the Totonac people, which is sometimes used as a disparaging term for indigenous people in general.

The term is often associated to lower social classes, but it is also used as an elitist expression from the educated to describe the uneducated, and among the middle and upper classes as a synonym of bad taste. In many situations, the word has derogatory intentions.

The Mexican definition of a naco does not perfectly translate to the American term redneck or hillbilly.

== Sociolinguistic use ==
In recent decades, the middle and upper classes in Mexico have experienced a rapid expansion due to, among other things, economic development and urbanization. The new middle class and "nouveau riche" have entered the competition on status symbols such as cars, houses, and jewelry, which have given rise to the term "naco" as a form of cultural or economic elitism. Mexicans of higher status often see extravagant displays of wealth as making a person more naco, in that they make spectacles of themselves by overcompensating for lower social status. The word naco is mostly used for ignorant people.

Within the last few decades, there have been movements in embracing the term and redefining it for self identity and pride. The title of the 1987 album by the band Botellita de Jerez is: "Naco es chido", which means "being naco is cool".

== See also ==
- Bogan
- Chav
- Cholo
- Dres
- Gopnik
- Greaser
- Lumpenproletariat
- Mexican Spanish
- Ratchet
- White trash
- Redneck
- Anti-intellectualism
