= Analogues =

- Theatrical release poster
- Directed by: Jorge Olguín
- Written by: Jorge Olguín
- Produced by: Carol Campos
- Starring: Mónica Carrasco; Jorge Gajardo
- Cinematography: Oliver Shaw
- Edited by: Jorge Romero
- Music by: Jorge Olguín
- Production companies: Olguin Films; Via X Films
- Release dates: November 2, 2023 (CURTAS Festival do Imaxinario); January 25, 2024 (Chile)
- Running time: 81 minutes
- Country: Chile
- Language: Spanish

Analogues (Spanish: Análogos) is a 2023 Chilean science fiction drama film written, scored and directed by Jorge Olguín. Starring Mónica Carrasco and Jorge Gajardo accompanied by Cindy Díaz. It is about an elderly couple who feel alone while an immigrant comes into their lives and an astronomical phenomenon appears in the sky.

== Synopsis ==
Blanca and José are an elderly people who spend the day watching television. Blanca suffers from an illness and depends on José. At night they completely lose the signal, due to an astronomical phenomenon that isolates them.

== Cast ==
- Mónica Carrasco as Blanca
- Jorge Gajardo as José
- Cindy Díaz as Cindy

== Production ==
Principal photography began in mid-June 2022 and ended 3 weeks later in Santiago, Chile.

== Release ==
It had its world premiere on November 2, 2023, at the 51st CURTAS Vilagarcía International Fantastic Film Festival, then was commercially released on January 25, 2024, in Chilean theaters.

== Accolades ==
Year	Award / Festival	Category	Recipient	Result	Ref.
2023	51st CURTAS Vilagarcía International Fantastic Film Festival	Jury Prize	Analogues	Won	
2024	Uruguayan Fantastic and Fear Film Festival	Best Acting Cast	Mónica Carrasco, Jorge Gajardo & Cindy Díaz	Won	
2024	LA Festival of Cinema	Best Film	Analogues	Nominated	
