= Mónica Carrasco =

Chilean actress and theater director

- Born: Mónica Eugenia Carrasco Torrealba; September 13, 1947 (age 78); Santiago de Chile
- Education: University of Chile
- Occupation: Actress
- Spouse: Jorge Gajardo
- Children: 2

Mónica Eugenia Carrasco Torrealba (Santiago, September 13, 1947) is a Chilean actress, popularly known for her role as Silvia Maturana in the sitcom Los Venegas broadcast daily between 1989 and 2011 in Televisión Nacional de Chile.

== Biography ==
Carrasco initially enrolled to study philosophy, earned a degree in French in Algeria, and completed a degree in theater and a Bachelor of Arts with a specialization in literature at the University of Chile. She later switched to Theater at the University of Chile.

Her interest in this field arose when she participated in an acting workshop run by the municipality of Ñuñoa, where the singer Víctor Jara was her teacher. In December 1973, at the age of 26, she left Chile, being exiled by the military dictatorship. She arrived in Colombia, where she worked in popular theater in Bogotá. However, she had to move to Algeria.

After returning to Chile, Mónica starred in her first telenovela, "Casagrande," on Canal 13, and later moved to TVN to appear in the productions "La gran mentira" and "El juego de la vida." However, her breakthrough role didn't come until May 1989 when she began playing Silvia Maturana in the popular TVN series "Los Venegas." This production ended in June 2011 after airing more than three thousand episodes. During this television project, the actress worked with Jorge Gajardo, who played her husband in the show. Both artists were also a couple off-screen, as they began a relationship in 1982, but did not marry until 2015. The couple has two children.

Carrascoalso served as Head of department and a professor at the Los Leones Professional Institute.

In 2024, she starred in the film "Analogues" directed by Jorge Olguín.

== Filmography ==
=== Films ===
Film
Year	Title	Director
1972	Ya no basta con rezar	Aldo Francia
1986	Hechos consumados	Luis R. Vera
1987	Sussi	Gonzalo Justiniano
1988	Consuelo	Luis R. Vera
1990	La niña en la palomera	Alfredo Rates
2004	Cachimba	Silvio Caiozzi
2007	Fiesta patria	Luis R. Vera
2008	Solos	Jorge Olguín
2012	Isidora	Christian Aylwin
2023	Analogues	Jorge Olguín

=== Television ===
Telenovelas
Year	Title	Character	Ref.
1981	Casagrande	Cristina	
1982	La gran mentira	Herminia Faúndez	
1983	El juego de la vida	—	
1983	Las herederas	Carmen	
1984	La represa	Viviana Burgos	
1984	La dama del balcón	Angélica San Román	
1985	El prisionero de la medianoche	Juana	
1987	La Quintrala	Mercedes Machado de Chávez	
1988	Las dos caras del amor	Elena Valdivieso	
1989	A la sombra del ángel	Berta Constanzo	
1993	Ámame	Zulema Costa	
1994	Rojo y miel	Sonia Vicuña	
2002	Buen partido	—	¿? episodios
2006	Montecristo	Sara Donoso	
2014	El regreso	Rosa Moreno	
2015	Esa no soy yo	Hortensia Salinas	
2016	Un diablo con ángel	Irma Flores	¿? episodios

Series
Year	Title	Character	Ref.
1971	La amortajada	Mónica	
1972	La sal del desierto	Flora	Episodio: Un poco de teatro
1980	Troncal Negrete	Melania	
1989-2011	Los Venegas	Silvia Maturana	
1990	Corín Tellado: Mis mejores historias de amor	Fernanda	Episodio: Valeri tiene un amante
2011	Vida por vida	Blanca	Episodio: ¿?
2012-2013	El reemplazante	Berta Serrano	
2012	Infieles	Myriam	Episodio: Pescado frito
2013	Lo que callamos las mujeres	—	Episodio: Debió sacar adelante a su familia
2017	Una historia necesaria	—	Episodio: Rodolfo González
2017	Irrevesible	Paula	Episodio: Póker mortal
2022-2024	El día menos pensado	Lucrecia / Virginia	2 episodios
2022	Paola y Miguelito, la serie	Génesis Santos	Episodio: El falso matrimonio
