= Jeż Jerzy =

Comic by Rafał Skarżycki and Tomasz Lew Leśniak

- Jeż Jerzy, Ścigany, published in 2003

Publication information
- Publisher: Egmont Poland
- Format: One-shot
- Genre: Funny animal; Anthropomorphic
- Publication date: 1996–present
- No. of issues: 10
- Main characters: Jeż Jerzy; Stefan; Zenek; Zombie; El Dresso
- ISSN: 1898-2107

Creative team
- Written by: Rafał Skarżycki
- Artist: Tomasz Lew Leśniak

Collected editions
- Jeż Jerzy – Collected Works, Volume 1: ISBN 978-83-66128-00-2
- Jeż Jerzy – Collected Works, Volume 2: ISBN 978-83-66128-24-8
- Jeż Jerzy – Collected Works, Volume 3: ISBN 978-83-66128-70-5
- Jeż Jerzy – Collected Works, Volume 4: ISBN 978-83-67360-13-5
- Jeż Jerzy – Collected Works, Volume 5: ISBN 978-83-67360-51-7

Jeż Jerzy (George the Hedgehog) is a adult-oriented Polish comic book title written by Rafał Skarżycki and illustrated by Tomasz Lew Leśniak.

The comic strip first appeared as part of a children's magazine called Świerszczyk. Originally, the strips were aimed at children with Jerzy the Hedgehog having adventures in a fairy tale-esque land. In 1996, the strips were first published in the magazine Ślizg as an "adult version".

The adult version of the comic strip was a satire on politics and modern Poland. The comic makes fun of groups like the police, ecologists, the subcultures of skinheads or dresiarze, or individuals, such as politicians (Andrzej Lepper and Grzegorz Kołodko). In the adult version, which has often been compared to South Park, the characters often swear, drink alcohol and take drugs. It is often violent and has scenes of nudity. Jerzy has become a part of the skateboarding subculture. The adult version is still running on Ślizg and many versions of the adult comic books were published both in and outside of Poland.

== Characters ==
- Jeż Jerzy (George the Hedgehog), the main character, he is a talking human-sized hedgehog and a skateboarder. He likes to drink beers, smoke marijuana and have sex with human females (in some stories they find him attractive; in others, repulsive). He loves his trusty skateboard. It seems that he has enemies everywhere, including the police and politicians. He often breaks the fourth wall.
- Stefan and Zenek are two of Jerzy's enemies. They represent the far right skinhead subculture. They are racist and they hate everything they consider unpatriotic.
- Zombie is a member of subculture called "dresiarze" who shot himself after Jerzy convinced him that he was gay. He later came back from the dead as a zombie to take revenge on the hedgehog.
- El Dresso, often referred to as "Mały" (Tiny), is a friend of Zombie who became a supervillain after his friend's death. In the Exorcist storyline, Zombie took over his body, as his own was destroyed.
- Kula and friends are a trio of bullies from the dresiarze subculture who often try to beat up Jerzy. The leader's name is Kula.
- The priest is an exorcist and a good friend of Jerzy.
- Przemysław R. is a serial killer who, after once failing to kill Jerzy, keeps coming back to seek revenge. In some ways, he is similar to Sideshow Bob from The Simpsons.
- Pietia "the Scar" Pavlov is a Russian hitman, often seen in the second book and then return as center character in book six, as well appears in the final volume.
- Yola is a very lusty girl who sometimes dates Jerzy. While a minor character in the comics, she plays a central part in the movie.
- Michał Puszka is a prison warden and friend of Jerzy.
- The Authors themselves occasionally appear in the stories as Jerzy's biological parents (even though they are both male).

== Albums ==
Child friendly version:

- Jeż Jerzy: Dla dzieci (For Children)

Adult versions:

- Jeż Jerzy: The True Story - The book is not counted as part of official series and it had a very limited print run, many of the stories were reprinted in later albums.
- Jeż Jerzy: Nie dla dzieci (Not for Children) – 2002. A series of short stories
- Jeż Jerzy: Wróg publiczny (The Public Enemy) – 2002. A series of short stories
- Jeż Jerzy: Egzorcysta (The Exorcist) – 2003. A long story. The story is a spoof of The Exorcist. In the story Jerzy is chosen by God to save the world from Satan's plot to take over.
- Jeż Jerzy: Ścigany (The Fugitive) – 2003. Short stories
- Jeż Jerzy: Dokument (The Documentary) – 2004. A series of short stories, combined with a host telling the story of Jerzy's life.
- Jeż Jerzy: Ziom (Homie) – 2005. Short stories.
- Jeż Jerzy: In vitro – 2006. Two long stories. One has Jerzy being cloned and the other has Jerzy being imprisoned with his enemy Przemysław R.
- Jeż Jerzy: Człowiek z Blizną (Scarface) – published in 2007. A long story and centred on the Pieta "the Scar" character.
- Jeż Jerzy: Musi umrzeć (Must Die) - published in 2009. It centers on the motif of death (i.e. Jerzy faking his own death to avoid paying bills).

== Awards ==
An episode of Jeż Jerzy won the Grand Prix at the International Festival of Comics in Łódź in 1999.

== Film ==
An animated film was released in 2011. The script was written by the authors themselves. The first teaser trailer can be seen on YouTube.

== See also ==
- Tymek i Mistrz
