= Flaite =

Chilean urban lower-class youth

Flaite (Spanish pronunciation: [ˈflajte]) is a Chilean Spanish slang term used to describe aggressive urban youth associated with vulgar habits and criminal behavior. The typical flaite stereotype portrays individuals from low socioeconomic backgrounds who may engage in delinquency, travel in groups, and exhibit a distinct dress style similar to chavs. They often enjoy music genres like cumbia and reggaeton.

Flaites typically wear sneakers such as Nike Dunks or other basketball and soccer shoes. They commonly sport short haircuts known as sopaipilla due to their resemblance to the fried pastry, often paired with jockey caps. They tend to accessorize with flashy items, referred to as bling-bling, and favor tightly worn jeans. Individuals from middle to upper socioeconomic backgrounds have adopted the flaite fashion style, wearing baggy jeans; this trend has led to speculation about the emergence of a subcultural group.

== Etymology ==
According to Darío Rojas, a linguist at the Department of Linguistics of the University of Chile, the origin of the term goes back to the word "faite" (itself derived from the anglicism "fighter"), which emerged in Lima (Peru) in the early 20th century and was later adapted into Chilean Spanish. Another hypothesis proposed by Rojas suggests that flaite refers to international lanzas (thieves) who travelled by air to commit crimes in Europe, which would explain a possible origin in the term "flighter". In 1969, Juan Chamblás Morales defined a "faite" as a "delinquent, tough guy".

== In popular culture ==
In 2005, the Chilean radio station Radio Carolina generated controversy with the humorous campaign "Pitéate un flaite" ("Take out a flaite"), aired as part of the program Máximo volumen. The campaign encouraged listeners to identify, report or punish individuals who behaved in ways associated with a flaite. The initiative’s classist, racist and discriminatory connotations led congresswoman Carolina Tohá to file a legal protection action against the station. Following the public backlash and legal actions, the radio station eventually cancelled the campaign.

In Chilean television, the stereotype has appeared in the docu-reality shows Dash & Cangri (2012) and Los Perlas (2017), was represented in the series El reemplazante (2012), and parodied in characters such as "El Shá!" by Daniel Muñoz and "Flaite Chileno" by Alex Ortiz.

== See also ==
- Apaçi (Turkey)
- Lad (Australia and New Zealand)
- Chav (UK)
- Villero (Argentina)
- Dres (Poland)
- Gopnik (Russia)
- Maloqueiro (Brazil)
- Low culture
