= Fotolog =

Social networking website

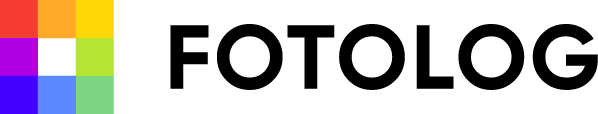
- Website type: social network
- Available in: English
- Founded: May 2002; 24 years ago
- Dissolved: (approx.) March 13, 2019
- Owners: Fotolog Innovation Labs, S.L.
- Website: www.fotolog.com
- Launched: April 23, 2002
- Current status: Offline

Fotolog.com (originally Fotolog.net) was a social network for sharing primarily photos. The site claimed that its vision was to build a "good" social network which prioritizes the well-being of users. The site only allowed all members of the community to post once per day, which, according to the site, was aimed to end the overuse of social networking today and the meaningless consumption of content.

In 2020 the Fotolog.com domain name was turned into an SEO spam blog.

== History ==
Launched in May 2002, the Fotolog site formerly generated over 3 billion page views, and it received over 20 million unique visitors each month. In 2007, Fotolog.com was in the list of the top 20 busiest websites in the Alexa global site rankings.

Fotolog used to be a registered trademark of Fotolog, Inc., which is a privately held company backed by BV Capital, 3i and several individual investors. Fotolog headquarters were in New York City, prior to its acquisition by Hi-Media Group.

The site had frequent technical problems during its growth. Originally, free accounts could not upload during peak hours, and only 500 people a day per country were allowed to register. On December 10, 2005, the site stated that "Fotolog is currently able to accept 1,000 new free accounts from each country each day", up from 500 a day previously. According to Fotolog co-founder Scott Heiferman, upgrades had made the site much faster and, as of November 16, 2005, Fotolog was generating 750 million pageviews a month. In mid-2006, 10,000 people per day, per country were allowed to register, and on August 14, 2006, the limiting of daily registrations was removed.

In 2005, Fotolog received an investment of $2.4 million from BV Capital.

In Spring 2006, a book of photographs from fotolog.com was published by the UK publisher Thames & Hudson titled fotolog.book: A Global Snapshot for the Digital Age. Edited by Andrew Long and containing text contributions by Nick Currie, the book is organized in sections highlighting several themes that arose in the site's community of photographers and several individual photographers from some of the major cities and countries with many fotolog users.

On August 17, 2007, French online advertising company HiMedia agreed to acquire Fotolog for a combination of stock and cash worth $90 million.

After a few weeks of periodic downtime, on January 26, 2016, Fotolog announced (in the form of a large header message on all pages) that the site was being closed down and would become "permanently unavailable" on the February 20. However, the header was removed later.

On April 24, 2018, a new website was released under the fotolog.com domain, with a new logo and an overhauled design. Fotolog posted the new logo with a small line of text saying "A new chapter of Fotolog begins here".

The last activity on the redesigned Fotolog website was recorded on March 13, 2019. Following this, Thinking Different, a company owned by serial domain name investor Kevin Macpherson, purchased the domain names for an undisclosed amount. Fotolog.com appeared as a completely new website on November 14, 2019. The new Fotolog.com presents itself as an online magazine. According to its WHOIS credentials, it now appears to be based in Brčko, Bosnia and Herzegovina.

== Usage ==
The website used to offer both free and subscription accounts. The free version was ad-supported, and it limited users to uploading one picture per day and having only 20 comments (in their "guestbook"). The free user could also customize their page and add other fotologs into their "Friends/Favorites" list.

Paying members, known as "Gold Camera patrons" were allowed to upload up to 6 pictures a day and to have 200 comments per photo. Subsequent changes allowed Gold Camera members to comment on any guestbook that was full. Other features included customized photo-headings and having the most recent image appear beside the member's name when commenting on other photoblogs.

However, the 2019 version was free for everyone and limited everyone to only post one photo per day in order to, according to the team letter, end the overuse of social networking today and the meaningless consumption of content.

The old Fotolog had "groups" which consisted of users focusing on a certain topic, and were managed by Fotolog users themselves. Fotolog groups allowed 50 photos per day. These photos might be added by any registered member. However, the "groups" feature was no longer available in the newer version.

Some site users, mainly in Chile, Argentina, Brazil and Spain, created so-called "dedicated fotologs" on their favorite actors and musicians, with images and information about them.

In Argentina and Uruguay, Fotolog gave rise to a fashion trend, called 'Flogger'. Chilean urban group pokemones made use of Fotolog.

== User demographics ==
The site was based in New York City, and the majority of its users come from the Americas, especially South America.

Previous site data showed that, as of September 2, 2008, Chile claimed the most accounts (4,827,387), Argentina was second with 4,225,209, and Brazil had 1,443,474 users. Fotolog's success prompted many other websites to appear and compete. In Spanish, and also in Portuguese, the word "fotolog" is almost universally understood to mean "any photoblog". For a time, Brazil was the country with most users; the site later lost users there to Orkut and Facebook.

== Password leak ==
According to Avast Hackcheck and Firefox Monitor, there was a massive security breach sometime between December 2018 and March 2019. 28 million accounts were affected. The leak contains usernames, passwords, salts, email addresses and additional personal information.
