= El Reemplazante =

Television series

- Genre: Drama
- Created by: Javier Bertossi; Nimrod Amitai; Ignacio Arnold
- Written by: Hernán Rodríguez Matte
- Directed by: Nicolás Acuña; Cristián Jiménez
- Opening theme: "Mi Verdad" by Anita Tijoux
- Country of origin: Chile
- Original language: Spanish
- No. of seasons: 2
- No. of episodes: 24

Production
- Executive producers: Rony Goldschmied; Leonora González
- Running time: 50 minutes

Original release
- Network: TVN
- Release: October 1, 2012 – January 1, 2014

El Reemplazante is a Chilean TV series originally broadcast on Televisión Nacional de Chile. The show follows a man, ousted from his previous financial career, who becomes a substitute math teacher at a low income school in Santiago. The plot was partially motivated by the Chilean student protests in 2011. Production was partially funded by the Consejo Nacional de Televisión de Chile. The showrunner was Hernan Rodriguez Matte. At the 2013 Altazor Awards, the show won awards for best direction, best screenplay, and best actor. Nicolas Acuña said that it is possible that a third season happens.

== Main cast ==
- Ivan Alvarez de Araya as Carlos "Charlie" Valdivia (1-2)
- Blanca Lewin as Ana (1-2)
- Karla Melo as Flavia (1-2)
- Sebastián Ayala as Maicol (1-2)
- Roberto Farias Morales as Francisco "Pancho" Valdivia (1-2)
- Sergio Hernández as Dionisio Valdivia (1-2)
- Gastón Salgado as Claudio (1-2)
- Trinidad Gonzalez as Nieves Mondaca (2)
- Valentina Muhr as Isabel Mellado (2)
- Maria Jose Illanes as Lucía(2)
- Rafael De La Reguera as Gerardo Munizaga (2)
- Rocío Monasterio as Kathy (1-2)

== Recurring cast ==
- Cristián Soto as Andres Rodriguez / Zafrada
- Pablo Rojas as Ariel
- Paula Aguilera as NicoleMonica Huenten as Jenny
- Jaime Azocar as Raul Jorquera
- Gonzalo Canelo as Hamster
- Maite Neira as Toya
- Mireya Montero as Mirta
- Juan Carlos Caceres as Horacio
- Silvia Hernandez as Maruja
- Jessica Carrasco as Flavia's Mum
- Ricardo Olea as Eduardo "Lalo" Ramírez
- Rodolfo Pulgar as Anibal Reyes
- Mónica Carrasco as Berta
- Ignacia Allamand as Rosario
- Daniela Lhorente as Mary
- Juan Jose Susacassa as Benjamin Valdivia
- Samuel Gonzales as Samuel
- Daniel Antivilo as Zafrada's Father
- Mario Bustos as Maton 2/Arturo
- Vilma M.Verdejo as Gladys/Maicol's Mother
- Elohim Ramon as Victor
- Stephanie Meza as Rosa
- Tito Bustamante as Hormazabal
- Jessica Vera as Ariel Mother
- Daniel De La Vega as Ariel Father
- Patricio Ordenes as Javier
- Ricardo Aliaga as Maton 1
- Nicolas Torres as Matón 2
- Rodrigo de Petris as Matón 1
- Elisa Vallejos as Miss Rita
- Carolina Itveens asApoderada/Jenny's Mother
- Otilio Castro as Flavia Father
- Varinia Aguilera
- Edaurdo Topelberg as Dueño del Bar/Guardia Disco
- Bastian Kinney as Diego
- Alejandro Mora as Carabinero 1
- Adrian Salgado as Gordo
- Angela Lineros as Ponce
- Ivan Tobar as Doctor
- Claudio Puebla as Dancer 1
- Macarena Morande as Inspectora Ministerio de Educación
- Alejandra Jara as Lalo Mother
- Werne Nuñez as Journalist
