= Dresiarz =

Polish term for a specific subculture of young males

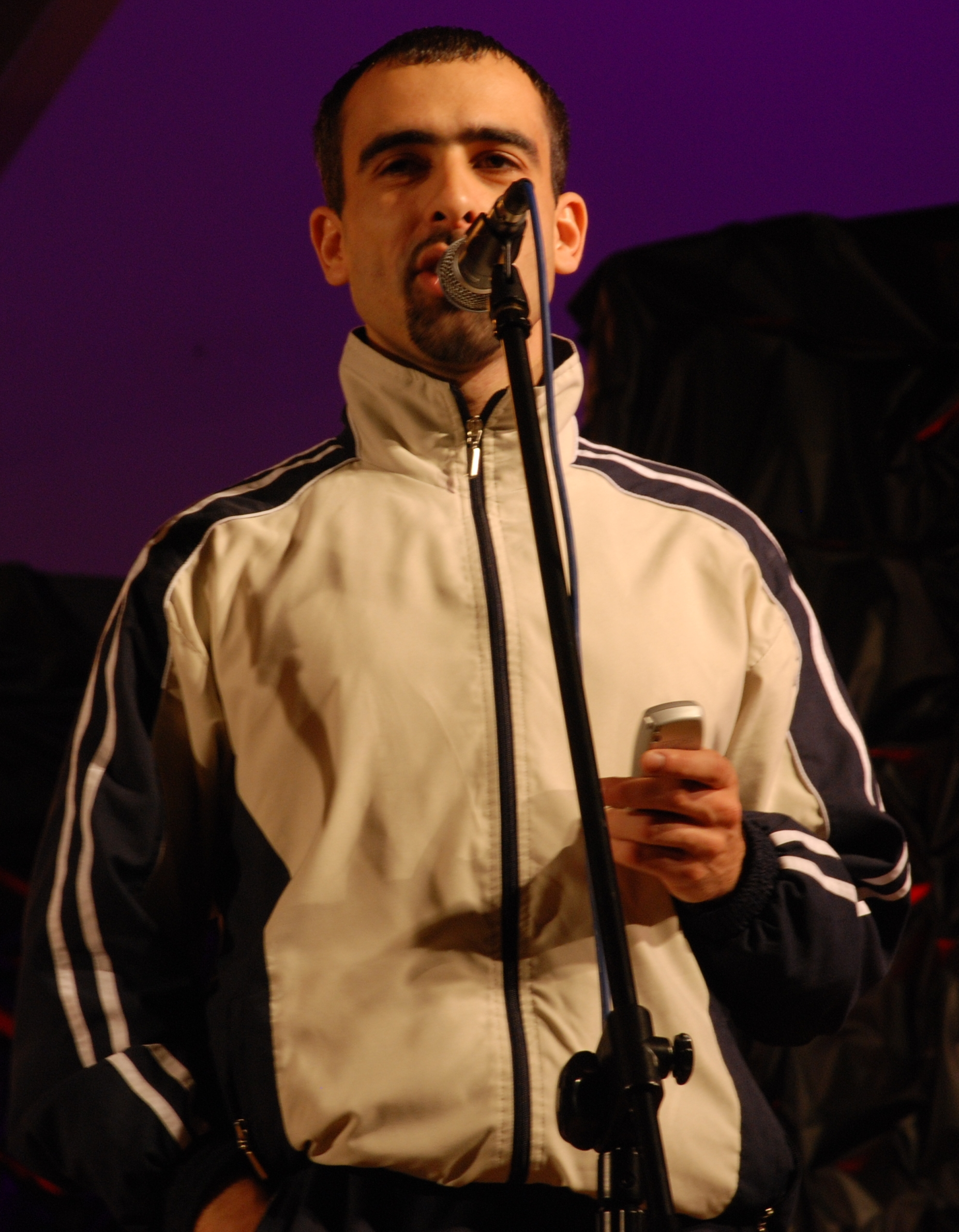
Abelard Giza dressed as dresiarz during his performance at Festiwal Kabaretu 2007 in Zielona Góra, Poland.

Dres [drɛs] or dresiarz [ˈdrɛɕaʂ] (plural dresy [ˈdrɛsɨ] or dresiarze [drɛˈɕaʐɛ]) is a Polish subculture or class of young males who stereotypically live in urban tower blocks or tenement houses. They are usually portrayed as undereducated, unemployed, aggressive, and anti-social. The dresiarz phenomenon was first observed in the 1990s and is sometimes compared to the British chavs, Scottish neds, Australian bogans or Russian gopniks. It would later partially merge with the hooligan subcultures and is sometimes attributed to football hooligans. The term refers to tracksuits, which in Polish is dres.

Kark (pl. Polish: karki – napes), Seba/Sebiks/Sebix/Sebek and blocker (pl. Polish: blokersi – block-people) are related but not synonymous terms; see below. The term has a pejorative connotation in Polish mass media.

Dorota Masłowska's novel White and Red is one of the first books published featuring the dresiarz phenomenon. Dresy have been a theme of (usually critical) songs by Dezerter and Big Cyc. They are also popular negative characters in the comic strip Jeż Jerzy.

== Characteristics ==
The following traits are typically attributed to the dresiarz stereotype:

- Taste in music usually encompassing Polish disco polo and rap, rarely techno, house genres or hardbass.
- Wearing tracksuits along with a hoodie and trainers; usually cheap counterfeit imitations of popular brands.
- Shaved head.
- Weight lifting and/or strength training in gyms.
- Affection for automobiles — at first they were stereotypically associated with heavily modified Fiat 126p cars (often with iconic Pioneer sticker covering the rear window), but recently they switched to older versions of BMW 3 and BMW 5 as well as Volkswagen Golf Mk2 and Opel Calibra, and recently their taste switched to Volkswagen Group automobiles, especially Audi. Apart from German cars, Japanese and East-Asian made cars such as the Honda Civic gained popularity due to the influence of the Fast & Furious franchise.
- Keeping aggressive dog breeds, such as the Pit Bull or American Staffordshire Terrier as pets (sometimes used in dog fights).
- Their female counterparts (Karyna) often have excessive solarium tans, bleached platinum blonde or pitch black dyed hair and wear artificial nails, mini-skirts, and crop tops.

== Related terms ==
- Kark, meaning "neck" and a short for byczy kark ("bull neck"), is most used in connection with weight lifting; a person perceived as a kark may be wearing neither trainers nor a tracksuit, but shares most other elements of stereotypical dres behavior. The term may also refer to lower-ranked members of gangster groups, i.e. "thugs".
- Blokers – a term for a young person exhibiting anti-social behavior, living in commie blocks (blok in Polish, also known as Soviet Khrushchevka). This term was used first time circa 1995 by Robert Leszczyński, a Polish music critic and journalist.
- ABS – an acronym for Absolutny Brak Szyi ("Total Lack of Neck"). See Kark. Often used pejoratively for heavily "pumped up" thugs and hooligans. The implied characteristic is anabolic steroid use.

== See also ==
- Australia: Bogan
- Chile: Flaite
- Denmark: Brian
- France: Loubard
- Ireland: Knacker (Spide or millie in Northern Ireland)
- Israel: Ars
- Mexico: Naco
- Netherlands: Gabber
- Norway: Harry
- Romania: Golani or Cocalari
- Russia: Gopnik
- Scotland: Ned
- Singapore/Malaysia: Ah beng
- United Kingdom: Chav
- Lithuania: Gezas or marozas
