= Tymek i Mistrz =

Tymek i Mistrz (Tymek and the Master, Tim and the Master) is a Polish children's humorous fantasy comic series authored by writer Rafał Skarżycki and illustrator Tomasz Lew Leśniak. The series is about the adventures of sorcerer's apprentice Tymek and his teacher. It is set in the Middle Ages, but with numerous indications to the present times.

During 2002-2004 the episodes of the comics were published in Komiksowo, the children's comic newspaper supplement to Gazeta Wyborcza. In 2003-2005 the episodes were collected into 40-page albums and published by Egmont Polska.

In 2016-2017 the imprint " Krótkie Gatki" of the Polish comic book publisher Kultura Gniewu published the complete set of Tymek i Mistrz in three volumes, including unpublished episodes, which were created after the cancellation of Komiksowo.

Tymek i Mistrz achieved a cult status in Poland, and its pieces can be found even in school textbooks of Polish language. It was also published by the Belgian comics magazine Spirou.

In 2014 Polish film studio SPInka (producer) and animation studio Human Ark started the production the animated film series, with the English title Tim and the Master. The project was financed in part by the Polish Film Institute. While the series was based on the plots from the comics, the scenarios are adapted to animation. It consists of 13 11-min. episodes (the whole set was delivered in 2017) aimed at children of 6–11 years.

== Plot basics ==
The unruly and bold, but misfortunate sorcerer's apprentice Tymek, and his absent-minded teacher, travel in space and time, help people and various creatures, fight with vampires, monsters, ghosts, etc. Their perennial opponents are the evil sorcerer Psuj and his apprentice Popsuj (both names are literally verbs meaning "spoil it" or "break it"; in the TV series they are translated as Spoiler an Tricker) The heroes have numerous "weird, crazy and absurd" adventures.

The peculiarity of the comics is that Tymek and Master are aware of both the Narrator and the Authors and often reprimand them.

== Albums by Egmont Polska ==
- Uczeń czarnoksiężnika (2003)
- Pojedynek magów (2003)
- Strachy na lachy (2003)
- Wyprawa na koniec świata (2004)
- Król kłopotów (2004)
- Perpetuum mobile (2005)
