= Chile ayuda a Chile =

- Genre: Telethon
- Created by: Don Francisco
- Developed by: ANATEL
- Directed by: Mauricio Correa, Juan Pablo González
- Country of origin: Chile
- Original language: Spanish
- No. of episodes: 1

Production
- Running time: 24 hours

Original release
- Network: TVN; Canal 13; Mega; Chilevisión; La Red; UCV TV; Telecanal
- Release: March 5 – March 6, 2010

Chile ayuda a Chile (Chile helps Chile) was a charity telethon being held from March 5 to March 6, 2010. The event was broadcast from Teatro Teletón in Santiago, Chile.

The telethon's aim was to raise money to help those affected by the 2010 Chile earthquake that struck the central-southern Chile on 27 February of that year. The event was organized by the Telethon Foundation and the Government of Chile, in coordination with Hogar de Cristo, Un Techo para Chile, the Fundación para la Superación de la Pobreza and Caritas, and was broadcast by all television stations affiliated with National Association of Television (Anatel) on national TV. The goal of the charity was to raise $15,000,000,000 for the construction of 30,000 emergency homes ("mediaguas") in the disaster area. Donations were to be deposited in account N° 2702 at Banco de Chile and Banco Santander.

During the event, over 46 billion pesos (90 million US dollars) were collected, and on March 9, 2010, Mario Kreutzberger said the event raised in total cash and goods over $50,000,000,000 (96.5 million dollars), thus surpassing the money raised by the Hope for Haiti Now event held in the United States in relief of the also earthquake-struck Caribbean country earlier that year.

== Background ==
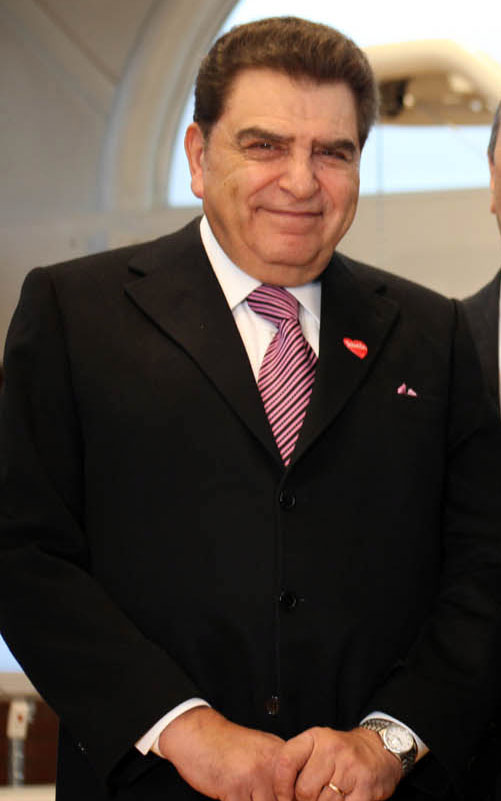
Don Francisco led the campaign.

TV host Mario Kreutzberger, better known as Don Francisco, has hosted a series of television campaigns since 1978, when he organized the first version of the Telethon. In 1985, during the earthquake that hit Chile on 3 March that year, Kreutzberger organized a campaign, broadcast on Canal 13 called Chile helps Chile, which, after 30 hours of non-stop broadcasting, managed to fund hundreds of trucks with supplies for victims. The event was repeated in later years, after other natural disasters such as flash floods, earthquakes, volcanic eruptions and others.

On February 27, 2010, the earthquake devastated central and southern Chile, with its epicentre in Cobquecura, Biobío Region, with a magnitude of 8.8 MW. The earthquake triggered a tsunami that affected a number of coastal towns from Valparaíso to the region of Araucania. The most affected communities were Dichato, Tomé, Pelluhue, Constitucion, Duao, Iloca and Pichilemu, among others. At the time of the earthquake, Kreutzberger was in South Africa, recording a new program (in the style of his classic "The camera passenger services Sabado Gigante) for Canal 13. From South Africa, he began to organize the telethon, and on 1 March, the Government of Chile met with the Telethon Foundation to formally organize the new edition.

On March 2, 2010, at a press conference, Pilar Armanet, Minister Secretary General of the Government of Chile, officially announced the relaunched campaign, along with representatives of organizations to be involved in the event: Ximena Casarejos (Telethon Foundation), Felipe Berrios SJ (Un Techo para Chile), Benito Baranda (Hogar de Cristo), Rodrigo Tupper (Caritas), Rodrigo Jordan (Foundation for Overcoming Poverty) and Bernardo Donoso (Anatel).

=== International response to the event ===
Due to the telethon broadcast, TVN did not air the first day of Davis Cup clash by teams of Chile and Israel, played in Coquimbo from March 6, and since tennis stars Fernando González and Nicolas Massú were playing the matches, they weren't able to be part of the charity event. However, Gonzalez played exhibition games in the later Sony Ericsson Open with Roger Federer and Rafael Nadal to help the earthquake victims in Chile. Cristián de la Fuente and his wife Angélica Castro, were organizing a parallel telethon from Mexico City with the Chilean community on March 7, 2010. At the same time in Madrid, Spain, Chilean actor Benjamín Vicuña led the charity event "Un poema para Chile" on March 6.

In Argentina, the then trainer of Argentinos Juniors Claudio Borghi led the charity campaign with the rest of the technical team, where he collected the aid donated by the soccer team's fans, and Los Fabulosos Cadillacs along with Gustavo Cerati leads a festival for Chile in Argentina, called "Argentina abraza a Chile", the event brought over 100,000 people, grossing more than 60 tons of donations.

In Italy, Chilean football player Luis Antonio Jiménez donated his Parma F.C. shirt to raise money to support those affected by the earthquake. Penélope Cruz pledged her support at 1,5 million Chilean pesos in aid to the victims.

== Participants ==
Mario Kreutzberger hosted the main show from Teatro Teletón and other celebrities broadcast live from the most devastated areas, including former Chilean Miss Universe Cecilia Bolocco, Felipe Camiroaga, Soledad Onetto, among others. Celebrities, athletes, TV presenters, comedians, actors and musicians co-hosted the main show, including: Tonka Tomicic, Diana Bolocco, Rafael Araneda, Karen Doggenweiler, Eva Gómez, Leo Caprile, José Miguel Viñuela, Vivi Kreutzberger, and Juan Carlos Valdivia.

Oscar winner Jorge Drexler wrote a poem with Chilean musician Nano Stern, titled "Quien en Chile un día vibró, tiembla cuando Chile tiembla", dedicated to the country in response to the earthquake. Ricardo Arjona, whose participation in the event was later cancelled, decided to send a letter to the Chilean people. Former Pink Floyd member Roger Waters also sent a letter to the country to pledge his solidarity and his support. The Killers donated their drumsticks to be auctioned during the event, while David Beckham donated his soccer team T-shirt, such as Fernando González and Nicolas Massú did.

=== Recorded messages ===
- Shakira
- Jonas Brothers
- Ricardo Montaner
- Joan Manuel Serrat
- Miguel Bosé
- Laura Pausini
- Leonor Varela
- Daddy Yankee
- Matt Hardy
- Jesse & Joy
- Gustavo Cerati
- Tito El Bambino
- Amaia Montero
- Amy Lee
- KoЯn
- Miranda!
- Fanny Lú
- Calle 13
- Ricky Martin
- Coldplay
- David Copperfield
- Alejandro Sanz
- Nelly Furtado
- Paulina Rubio
- Luis Fonsi
- David Bisbal
- Enrique Iglesias

=== Performers ===
- Diego Torres
- Beto Cuevas
- Américo y La Nueva Alegría
- Chico Trujillo
- La Noche
- Difuntos Correa
- Los Jaivas
- Chancho en Piedra
- Banda Conmoción
- Garras de Amor
- 3x7 = Veintiuna
- Los Huasos Quincheros
- Los Truqueros
- Los Tres
- Las Capitalinas
- BKN
- CRZ
- Myriam Hernandez
- Sinergia
- Rigeo
- Mario Guerrero
- Juanes
- DJ Méndez
- Daniela Castillo
- María Jimena Pereyra
- María José Quintanilla
- Natalino
- Joe Vasconcellos
- Illapu
- Catalina Palacios
- Lucybell
- Congreso
- Croni-K
- Francisca Valenzuela
- Sonora de Tommy Rey
- Los Charros de Lumaco
- Inti-Illimani
- Buddy Richard
- Carolina Molina
- Nicole

=== Celebrity phone operators ===
- Marcelo Bielsa
- Benito Baranda
- Belipe Berríos
- Harold Mayne-Nicholls
- Carolina Arregui
- Ignacio Garmendia
- Fernando Paulsen
- Cristian Sánchez
- Carmen Gloria Arroyo
- Kike Morandé
- Luis Jara
- Martín Cárcamo
- Katherine Salosny
- Janis Pope
- Ivan Zamorano
- Claudia Conserva
- Savka Pollak
- Fernando Godoy
- Jean Paul Luksic
- Ana María Polo
- Horst Paulmann
- Stefan Kramer
- Bombo Fica
- Isabel Allende
- Dino Gordillo
- Álvaro Salas
- Francisco López Contardo
- Tomás González
- Felipe Aguilar
- Carlo de Gavardo
- Juan Andrés Salfate
- Mey Santamaría
- Javiera Acevedo
- René Naranjo
- René O'Ryan
- Américo
- Christopher Toselli
- Cecilia Bolocco

=== Transmission from different cities ===
- Cecilia Bolocco (Santiago)
- Felipe Camiroaga (Concepción)
- Soledad Onetto (Constitución)
- Felipe Vidal (Lota, Talca)
- Javiera Contador (Concepción, Dichato)
- Julián Elfenbein (Arica, Iquique, Antofagasta, Calama, La Serena)
- Sebastián Jiménez (Talca)
- Myriam Hernández (Santiago)

== Programming ==
Unlike the traditional Chilean Telethon events, the organization decided not to include comedian segments, adult strip known as "Vedettón", and massive closure in National Stadium. The blocks in which transmission will be split:

- Overture (22:00 — 01:00)

Speech by President Michelle Bachelet, President-elect Sebastián Piñera and the Secretary-General of the United Nations Ban Ki-moon, and performances of Américo y La Nueva Alegría, Beto Cuevas and Los Tres. These are preceded by the opening number paying tribute to Chile's Bicentennial Year of Independence.

- Chile canta a Chile (01:00 — 06:00)

Music performances of La Noche, Croni-K, Chancho en Piedra and others.

- Viva Chile y su Cueca (06:00 — 08:00)

Music performances of Los Truqueros, Las Capitalinas, Los Quincheros and 3X7 Veintiuna.

- News block (08:00 — 10:00)
- Chile en familia (10:00 — 13:00)

Kids motivate their parents in "Chile en familia" and guest performances by La Banda Corazón Rebelde, María José Quintanilla, Magic Twins, BKN and Natalino.

- Young block (13:00 — 18:00)

Presented by television shows Yingo and Calle 7, with musical performances by Rigeo and Francisca Valenzuela.

- Closure (18:00 — 22:00)

Includes performances by Juanes, Luis Jara, Tito El Bambino, Los Jaivas and Diego Torres.

Notes

At 20:30 (UTC-4) a pre-event transmission via Internet in the official site has held, hosted by TV journalist Juan Manuel Astorga, TV news anchorman Fernando Paulsen, and media personality Nicolás Copano.

== Partial collecting ==
Hour (UTC-4)	Amount (CLP)	Total %	Amount (USD)	Amount (EUR)
22:24	$21,000	0.01%	$41	€30
00:16	$1,799,301,435	12.00%	$3,531,851	€2,592,945
02:18	$3,537,942,371	23.59%	$6,944,631	€5,098,473
05:39	$4,467,316,867	29.78%	$8,768,901	€6,437,780
09:23	$5,764,826,058	38.43%	$11,315,784	€8,307,600
12:00	$6,505,532,161	43.37%	$12,769,717	€9,375,019
15:10	$7,200,984,876	48.00%	$14,134,822	€10,377,225
16:11	$9,894,914,282	65.97%	$19,422,739	€14,259,404
17:23	$11,193,470,821	74.62%	$21,971,680	€16,130,733
19:09	$12,687,240,955	84.58%	$24,903,800	€18,283,382
20:20	$13,470,489,741	89.80%	$26,441,240	€19,412,109
20:50	$14,801,897,982	98.67%	$29,054,663	€21,330,781
21:23	$17,920,090,309	114.61%	$33,746,374	€24,775,249
22:07	$24,684,042,645	164.56%	$48,452,336	€35,571,783
23:06	$30,212,775,555	201.42%	$59,304,692	€43,539,152
Total	$45,974,813,684	306.49%	$90,224,386	€66,341,722

== Music ==
Chilean singer Beto Cuevas, former leader of pop/rock band La Ley, recruited artists such Mexican Fher, vocalist of Maná, Spanish Miguel Bosé and Colombian Juanes, to record a new version of the song "Gracias a la Vida", originally performed by legendary Chilean folklorist Violeta Parra. Sales of the single were donated to the victims of the earthquake. International stars Alejandro Sanz, Laura Pausini, Michael Bublé, Julieta Venegas, and Juan Luis Guerra also participated in the single, which was released on March 22, 2010 via Warner Bros. Records.

Chilean songwriter Alberto Plaza re-record his song "Que Cante La Vida" with other artists, such as Belinda, Marta Sánchez, Carlos Baute, Alexandre Pires, Kudai, Ricardo Montaner, Christian Chávez, Franco De Vita, Fonseca, among others. Aleks Syntek, Alejandra Guzmán, Olga Tañon, Luis Fonsi, Jorge Villamizar, Alex Ubago, A.B. Quintanilla, Noel Schajris, Pee Wee, Lena Burke, Marciano Cantero, Juan Fernando Velasco, Fausto Miño, Gianmarco, the Chileans Pablo Herrera and Mario Guerrero also joined the musical effort. The project was led by EMI Music and Capitol Records with the assistance of other record companies like Warner Music, Sony Music and Universal Music, among others in conjunction with major Latin music channel HTV. The song was released commercially in late March 2010.

=== Album ===
Year	Title	Peak chart positions					Certifications (sales thresholds)
Year	Title	US	CHI	MEX	SPA	CHI	Certifications (sales thresholds)
2009	Música por Chile: Released: March 24, 2010; Label: Independent; Genre: Pop, alternative rock, folk	—	—	—	—	—	

=== Singles ===
Year	Title	Peak chart positions					Album
Year	Title	US Latin	CHI	ARG	MEX	SPA	Album
2010	"Que Cante la Vida"	—	52	—	—	—	Non-album single
2010	"Yo Voy Contigo"	—	99	—	—	—	Non-album single
2010	"Gracias a la Vida"	—	20	—	—	—	Non-album single
