= Gianmarco =

- Pronunciation: IPA: [dʒamˈmarko]
- Gender: Male

Origin
- Origin: Italy
- Meaning: John Mark
- Region of origin: Italy, Switzerland

Other names
- Alternative spelling: Gian Marco, Giammarco
- Related names: John, Mark, Marco, Giovanni

Gianmarco, also spelled Gian Marco or Giammarco, is an Italian masculine given name. Its English equivalent is "John Mark" and it is short for Giovanni Marco.

Notable people with the name include:

- Gianmarco Bellini (born 1958), Italian Air Force officer
- Gian Marco Berti (born 1982), Sammarinese sports shooter
- Gianmarco Busca (born 1965), Italian Roman Catholic prelate
- Gianmarco Buttazzo (born 1977), Italian long-distance runner
- Gianmarco Calleri (1942–2023), Italian footballer
- Gianmarco Campironi (born 1989), Italian footballer
- Gianmarco Cangiano (born 2001), Italian footballer
- Gianmarco Cavagnino (born 1964), Italian architect
- Gian Marco Centinaio (born 1971), Italian politician
- Gianmarco Chironi (born 1997), Italian footballer
- Gian Marco Ciampa (born 1990), Italian guitarist
- Gianmarco Conti (born 1992), Italian footballer
- Gian-Marco Crameri (born 1972), Swiss ice hockey coach
- Gian Marco Crespi (born 2001), Italian footballer
- Gianmarco De Feo (born 1994), Italian footballer
- Gianmarco Di Biase (born 2005), Italian footballer
- Gianmarco Di Francesco (born 1989), Italian cyclist
- Gianmarco Donaggio (born 1991), Italian experimental film director and cinematographer
- Gianmarco Ercoli (born 1995), Italian professional racing driver
- Gianmarco Fabbri (born 1997), Italian footballer
- Gian Marco Ferrari (born 1992), Italian footballer
- Giammarco Frezza (born 1975), Italian footballer
- Gianmarco Gabbianelli (born 1994), Italian footballer
- Gianmarco Gambetta (born 1991), Peruvian-Italian footballer
- Gianmarco Garofoli (born 2002), Italian cyclist
- Gianmarco Gerevini (born 1993), Italian footballer
- Gianmarco Ingrosso (born 1989), Italian footballer
- Gianmarco Leiva (born 1995), Peruvian chess player
- Giammarco Levorato (born 2003), Italian racing driver
- Gianmarco Lucchesi (born 2000), Italian rugby union player
- Gian Marco Marcucci (born 1954), former Captain Regent of San Marino
- Gianmarco Mazzi (born 1960), Italian politician
- Giammarco Menga (born 1990), Italian sports journalist
- Gian Marco Moroni (born 1998), Italian tennis player
- Gian Marco Nesta (born 2000), Italian footballer
- Gianmarco Nicosia (born 1998), Italian water polo player
- Gianmarco Ottaviano (born 1967), Italian economist
- Gianmarco Piccioni (born 1991), Italian footballer
- Gianmarco Pozzecco (born 1972), Italian basketball player
- Gianmarco Pozzoli (born 1971), Italian actor and comedian
- Gianmarco Pradel (born 2006), Australian racing driver
- Gianmarco Raimondo (born 1990), Canadian racing driver
- Gian Marco Schivo (born 1949), Italian high jumper
- Gianmarco Soresi (born 1988), American comedian, actor and internet personality
- Gianmarco Tamberi (born 1992), Italian high jumper
- Gianmarco Tognazzi (born 1967), Italian actor
- Gianmarco Vannucchi (born 1995), Italian footballer
- Gian Marco Zignago (born 1970), Peruvian musician
- Gianmarco Zigoni (born 1991), Italian footballer
