= Andrea Masetti =

Italian footballer (born 1998)

Personal information
- Date of birth: 20 March 1998 (age 28)
- Place of birth: Guastalla, Italy
- Height: 1.82 m (6 ft 0 in)
- Position: Left-back

Team information
- Current team: Gozzano

Youth career
- –2015: Parma
- 2015–2017: Sassuolo

Senior career*
Years	Team	Apps	(Gls)
2017–2019	Sassuolo	0	(0)
2017–2018	→ Fano (loan)	10	(0)
2018–2019	→ Pontedera (loan)	23	(0)
2019–2020	Arezzo	0	(0)
2019–2020	→ Pro Patria (loan)	22	(1)
2021	Pro Patria	5	(1)
2021–2022	Nardò	35	(3)
2022–2023	US Levico Terme	33	(3)
2023	US Albenga	19	(1)
2023–2024	Sangiovannese	17	(2)
2024	Lentigione Calcio	6	(0)
2024–	Gozzano	49	(3)
- * Club domestic league appearances and goals as of 25 June 2026

Andrea Masetti (born 20 March 1998) is an Italian footballer who plays as a left-back for Serie D Gozzano.

== Club career ==
=== Sassuolo ===
Born in Guastalla, Masetti was a youth exponent of Sassuolo.

==== Loan to Fano ====
On 17 July 2017, Masetti was signed by Serie C side Alma Juventus Fano on a season-long loan deal. On 1 October he made his Serie C debut for the club as a substitute replacing Gianmarco Fabbri in the 17th minute of a 1–0 home defeat against Ravenna. Three days later, on 4 October, Masetti played his first entire match for Alma Juventus Fano, a 2–1 away defeat against Vicenza. Masetti ended his season-long loan with only 10 appearances, including 8 as a starter, but all in the first part of the season and he remained an unused substitute for 19 times during the rest of the season.

==== Loan to Pontedera ====
On 11 July 2018, Masetti was loaned to Serie C club Pontedera on a season-long loan deal. On 29 July he made his debut for Pontedera in a match lost 4–2 at penalties after a 1–1 away draw against Ternana in the first round of Coppa Italia, he was replaced by Alessio Benedetti in the 70th minute. On 22 September he made his Serie C debut for Pontedera as a substitute replacing Andrea Magrini in the 93rd minute of a 2–0 away defeat against Piacenza. On 21 October, Masetti played his first match as a starter for Pontedera in Serie C, a 0–0 away draw against Pro Vercelli, he was replaced after 66 minute for Nicolas La Vigna. On 9 December he played his first entire match for Pontedera, a 2–1 home win over Pro Piacenza. Masetti ended his loan to Pontedera with 24 appearances.

=== Arezzo ===
On 22 July 2019, Masetti joined to Serie C side Arezzo on an undisclosed fee and a 2-year contract. On 11 August he made his debut or the club in a 4–3 away defeat against Crotone in the second round of Coppa Italia, he played the entire match. On 6 October 2020 his contract was terminated by mutual consent.

==== Loan to Pro Patria ====
On 2 September 2019, he joined Pro Patria on loan with a purchase option. Six days later, on 8 September, he made his debut for the club as a substitute replacing Leonardo Galli in the 62nd minute of a 1–1 home draw against Pergolettese. On 25 September he played his first entire match for Pro Patria, a 2–0 home win over Pianese. On 15 December he scored his first professional goal in the 65th minute of a 3–0 away win over Giana Erminio. Masetti ended his season-long loan to Pro Partia with 22 appearances, including 14 as a starter, and 1 goal.

=== Return to Pro Patria ===
On 3 March 2021, he returned to Pro Patria until the end of the 2020–21 season.

=== Later clubs ===
On 11 September 2021, he joined Serie D club Nardò. Ahead of the 2022-23 season, Masetti then moved to US Levico Terme. A year later, he joined US Albenga.

== Career statistics ==
=== Club ===
As of 2 July 2020

Club	Season	League			Cup		Europe		Other		Total	
Club	Season	League	Apps	Goals	Apps	Goals	Apps	Goals	Apps	Goals	Apps	Goals
Fano (loan)	2017–18	Serie C	10	0	0	0	—		—		10	0
Pontedera (loan)	2018–19	Serie C	23	0	1	0	—		—		24	0
Arezzo	2019–20	Serie C	0	0	1	0	—		—		1	0
Pro Patria (loan)	2019–20	Serie C	22	1	0	0	—		—		22	1
Career total			55	1	2	0	—		—		57	1

== Honours ==
=== Club ===
Sassuolo Primavera

- Torneo di Viareggio: 2017
