= Japan and the World Bank =

Japan joined the World Bank Group in August 1952. Loans that were taken out by Japan focused on improving infrastructure, having electrical power generation, improving water, establishing basic industry development and improving transportation. Japan now is the second-largest creditor to the World Bank, and in 1970 established an office in Tokyo.

== Japan joins the World Bank ==
Post World War II, Japan signed the US–Japan Security Treaty in 1951 with the United States, and in 1952 Japan signed the Treaty of San Francisco, settling post-war international tensions and re-establishing Japan's position after its participation with the Axis Powers. Additionally, Japan lacks the natural resources and the space for agriculture to support its dense population. To meet this need, Japan increased its manufacturing to increase exports and receive foreign dollars in order to pay for the necessary imports of raw materials. Japan's exports manufactured products include electronics, motor parts, and cars. In exporting to its foreign recipients, Japan sorts its balance of payments and is able to afford imports on foreign dollars.

As Japan needed a jump start on this manufacturing and restructuring, Japan began joining international organizations, like the IMF and the World Bank. In August of 1952, Japan became a member of the World Bank, a decision supported by U.S. A year later, in 1953, Japan received loans from the World Bank to start development projects including the improvement of infrastructure, electricity, and transportation. With the foreign currency loans from the bank, Japan was able to make serious repairs to the damages from World War II and being its economic growth again.

During the 1960s, Japan's economy grew immensely, rising as the second most powerful economy after the United States. This became known as the Japanese Economic Miracle, and it helped Japan to rise as a power and transition from a borrower of the World Bank to a contributor.

== Shifting from borrowing to lending ==
Japan finished repaying its debt by 1990, at which point the World Bank and Japan established the Policy and Human Resources Development Fund (PHRD). Between 1950 and 1960 Japan was seen as the "Major Borrower" because of the total amount of loans they were taking out. At the turn of 1967, Japan graduated from "Borrower Status," instead becoming a creditor. From 1970 to 1980, Japan went forward to become the 2nd Largest Shareholder during 1984.

== Japan: the second largest contributor to the World Bank ==
The World Bank consists of different funding organizations, such as the IBRD, IFC, IDA, and MIGA. The World Bank allots each country a set number of votes and then additional votes according to the shares that a country holds within that organization. Japan currently holds 7.08% of voting power in the International Bank for Reconstruction and Development (IBRD) (June 30, 2024), 7.34% in the International Finance Corporation (IFC) (July 26, 2024), 8.42% in the International Development Agency (IDA) (June 30, 2024), and 4.16% in the Multilateral Investment Guarantee Agency (MIGA) (June 30, 2024). These percentages are relatively high in comparison to the voting power of the other 189 members.

After the United States, Japan is the second largest voting power of the World Bank since 1984, followed by China, Germany, and then the United Kingdom. Japan, along with the four other largest shareholders, choose five executive directors for the Board of Executive Directors. It is often understood that Japan's voting power in the World Bank reflects its global economic status. However, Japan's status and triumphant economy is slowing stagnating, with a lack of labor and Japanese businesses seeking foreign investors rather than domestic. In combination with slow demand and consumption, Japan entered a recession, and in 2023, Japan's Cabinet Office announced the country fell behind Germany, with a new position as the third-largest economy. Already, in the IMF, it is suspected that Japan will fall from its position as second shareholder after the U.S., since shareholder's are analyzed based on economy size and GDP. With the World Bank's voting allocations reflecting that of the IMF, it's possible to see a shift in Japan's influence in the World Bank in upcoming years as other countries, like India and Germany, rise up and take on more shares.

Japan's World Bank Group Executive Director is Hideaki Imamura (in office since July 2023) and the Alternate Executive Director is Koji Uemura (since July 29,2023). The Executive Director represents Japan and governs with the other Executive Directors of the World Bank in conducting daily operations of the organization.

== Japan's influence within the World Bank Group ==
Masonori Yoshida is the current executive director for Japan within the World Bank. Yoshida works closely with 24 other executive directors within the World Bank to fight global poverty and also focus on development with 189 other countries. Yoshida previously held the alternative executive director role from 2000 to 2003 and became the executive director for Japan on August 6, 2018. Masonori Yoshida has not only kept within the World Bank Group but has also jumped to the International Monetary Fund and served as the Adviser to the European Department. Japan's voting power within the International Bank for Reconstruction and Development is 193,708 number of votes and currently holds about 7.79% of the votes within the IBRD. In the International Development Association (IDA), Japan has a total of 193,708 votes and that makes up about 7.79% of the votes. In the International Finance Corporation (IFC), Japan has a total of 163,349 votes and has about 6.01% of the votes. In the Multilateral Investment Guarantee Agency (MIGA) Japan has a total of 9,205 of the total number of votes which makes up 4.22% of the votes. Kenichi Nishikata became the alternative executive director for Japan in July 2017. Nishikata served as the Senior Adviser for the executive director of Japan from 2006 to 2009 and then became the alternative executive director for Japan. Nishikata has held several different leadership roles within Japan which made him a perfect fit as executive director.

== Japan's recent contributions ==
The World Bank holds an annual meeting, based in Washington D.C., to review the progress of the Bank. The Development Committee comes together, consisting of members of the Board of Governors of the World Bank and the IMF, to review international developments and individual country contributions.

As such a large economic power and international player, Japan has a sent funding and supported loans for countries in war times. Most recently, during the 109th Meeting of the Developmental Committee on April 19, 2024, Japan released a statement expressing concern for the Russia and Ukraine crisis and advocating for the World Bank to offer support to Ukraine. In this statement, Japan announced its credit enhancement to the IBRD for $5 billion in loans to be given to Ukraine for reconstructions purposes in addition to the $470 million grant Japan has already given Ukraine through the IBRD for use of public services and directly helping the Ukrainian people. Additionally, Japan made a statement regarding the Gaza conflict announcing its contribution of $2 million to MIGA and the Gaza Trust Fund for future repairs.

In regards to the global COVID-19 epidemic, Japan donated $3.4 billion to the IDA of the World Bank for countries financially suffering due to effects and rise of COVID in 2021.

=== JICA ===
In addition to its contributions to the World Bank, Japan promotes infrastructure development and advancement towards disability inclusion through JICA. In 1974, the Japan International Cooperation Agency (JICA) was founded with focuses on social services climate change, and infrastructure in developing countries.

=== ADB ===
In 1965 Japan led the creation of the Asian Development Bank which is focused on making investments for developments and projects of its members. The ADB consists of over 40 regional countries, especially from the regional area of Southeast Asia.

== Past projects ==
In total, Japan has had about 31 Loans from the World Bank. The final repayment was in July 1990. Since then Japan has become one of the top contributors that funds the World Bank.

Year	Date signed	Beneficiary	Project	Current status
1953	October 15	Kansai Electric Power Co. Ltd.	Tanagawa Thermal Power Station	Completed
1953	October 15	Kyushu Electric Power Co. Ltd.	Karita Thermal Power Station	Completed
1953	October 15	Chubu Electric Power Co. Ltd.	Yokkaichi Thermal Power Station	Completed
1955	October 25	Yawata Iron & Steel Co. Ltd.	Steel-plate Production Facilities	Completed
1956	February 21	Nippon Steel Tube Co. Ltd.	Seamless Tube Production Facilities	Completed
1956	February 21	Toyota Motor Co. Ltd.	Koromo Plant Truck and Bus Machine Tools	Completed
1956	February 21	Ishikawajima Heavy Industries Co. Ltd.	Tokyo Marine Engine Turbine Production Facilities	Completed
1956	February 21	Mitsubishi Shipbuilding & Engineering Co. Ltd.	Nagasaki Shipyard Diesel engine Production Facilities	Completed
1956	December 19	Kawasaki Steel Corporation	Chiba Plant Hot and Cold Strip Mills	Completed
1956	December 19	Agricultural Land Development Machinery Public Corporation	Several Agricultural Development Projects	Completed
1957	August 9	Aichi Waterworks Corporation	Public Water Project in Aichi Prefecture	Completed
1958	January 9	Kawasaki Steel Corporation (2nd Loan)	Chiba Works 1,000 Ton Blast Furnace, Coke Oven	Completed
1958	June 13	Kansai Electric Power Co. Ltd. (2nd Loan)	Kurobe No. 4 Hydroelectric Power Station (three turbines; 86MW)	Completed
1958	June 27	Hokiriku Electric Power Co. Ltd.	Arimine Hydroelectric Power Station (261MW)	Completed
1958	July 11	Sumitomo Metal Industries Ltd.	Wakayama Works 1,000 Ton Blast Furnace and Blooming Mill	Completed
1958	August 18	Kobe Steel Ltd.	Nadahama 800 Ton Blast Furnace and Wakihama Steel Mill	Completed
1958	September 10	Chubu Electric Power Co. Ltd. (2nd Loan)	Hatanagi No. 1 and No. 2 Hydroelectric Power Stations (85 MW)	Completed
1958	September 10	Nippon Steel Tube Co. Ltd. (2nd Loan)	Mizue Works 60 Ton Steel Converter	Completed
1959	February 17	Electric Power Development Co. Ltd.	Miboro Hydroelectric Power Station (215 MW)	Completed
1959	November 12	Fuji Iron & Steel Co. Ltd.	Hirohata Works 1,500 Ton Blast Furnace, Converter and Blooming Mill	Completed
1959	November 12	Yawata Iron & Steel Co. Ltd. (2nd Loan)	Tobata Works 1,500 Ton Blast Furnace, Converter and Blooming Mill (two)	Completed
1960	March 17	Japan Highway Public Corporation	Amagasaki Ritto Section of the Meishin Expressway	Completed
1960	December 20	Kawasaki Steel Corporation (3rd Loan)	Chiba Works Slab Casting Facilities Construction	Completed
1960	December 20	Sumitomo Metal Industries, Ltd. (2nd Loan)	Wakayama Works Combined Mill	Completed
1961	March 16	Kyushu Electric Power Co. Ltd. (2nd Loan)	Shin-Kokura Thermal Power Station (156 MW)	Completed
1961	May 2	Japan National Railways	Tokaido Shinkansen (Bullet Train) Line	Completed
1961	November 29	Japan Highway Public Corporation (2nd Loan)	Ichinomiya Ritto & Amagasaki Nishinomiya Sections of the Meishin Expressway	Completed
1963	September 27	Japan Highway Public Corporation (3rd Loan)	Tokyo Shizuoka Section of the Tomei Expressway	Completed
1964	April 22	Japan Highway Public Corporation (4th Loan)	Toyokawa Komaki Section of the Tomei Expressway	Completed
1964	December 23	Metropolitan Expressway Public Corporation	Haneda Yokohama Section of the Metropolitan Expressway	Completed
1965	January 13	Electric Power Development Co. Ltd. (2nd Loan)	Kuzuryugawa Hydroelectric Power Stations (Nagano and Yugami)	Completed
1965	May 26	Japan Highway Public Corporation (5th Loan)	Shizuoka Toyokawa Section of the Tomei Expressway	Completed
1965	September 10	Hanshin Expressway Public Corporation	Kobe Line No. 1	Completed
1966	July 29	Japan Highway Public Corporation (6th Loan)	Tokyo Shizuoka Section of the Tomei Expressway	Completed

== Joint ventures with the World Bank ==
The Government of Japan and the World Bank Group both have joint ventures, used to strengthen the relations between the government of Japan and the organization. The joint ventures are the Japan Policy and Human Resource Development Fund (PHRD), Japan Social Development Fund (JSDF), Climate Investment Fund (CIF) and Learning from Mega Disasters.

=== Japan policy and the Human Resource Development Fund (PHRD) ===
In the JSDF, the Government of Japan has funded $3.0 Billion US dollars. The overall purpose for the Japan Policy and Human Resource Development Fund is to help with preparation and implementation which involve the World Bank. The PHRD has been very innovative when it comes to climate change because recently has started co-financing projects that are completely related to climate change. The PHRD is one of the largest funds within the World Bank, and Japan supports it since 1990, and within the last couple of years the PHRD has paid for at least one-third of the IBRD and IDA loans. Japan Policy and Human Resource Development Fund has also been credited with pushing for innovations. The top ten recipients during Fiscal Year 2006 of PHRA TA Grants were Vietnam receiving 10.8 million, Azerbaijan receiving 7.5 million, Kyrgyzstan receiving 4.7 million, The Philippines receiving 4.2 million, Albania receiving 4.0 million, Senegal receiving 4.0 million, Kenya receiving 3.2 million, Nigeria receiving 3.0 million, The Gambia receiving 3.0 million and Indonesia receiving 2.9 million.

=== Japan Social Development Fund (JSDF) ===
The Japan Social Development Fund specializes in helping the individuals that were affected by the Asian Financial Crisis, and it focuses mostly on low-income countries. The Japan Social Development Fund was established to provide grants to the countries that need them, and there are three types of grant categories; Regular Program Grants, Special Program Grants, and Seed-Fund Grants. Regular Program Grants were grants that covered up to $3 million US dollars towards activities that would benefit disadvantaged individuals. Special Program Grants, helped the reconstruction of Afghanistan and pushed them forward to become a stable country. Lastly, Seed-Fund Grants are the grants which are used for the preparation phase during the process they are only helpful with $75,000 US dollars. The two main type of grants that Japan Social Development Fund focuses on are Project Grants and Capacity Building Grants. Project Grants are types of grants that focus of benefiting low-income individuals for a short term. Capacity Building Grants are grants that mainly focus on financing partnerships and strengthen relationships.

=== Climate Investment Fund (CIF) ===
The Climate Investment Fund is another venture between the World Bank Group and the government of Japan. It focuses on fighting climate change by taking some action to become greener. The amount of money that the Climate Investment Fund has is about $8 billion, and these funds are mainly given to developing and middle-income countries so they can afford climate financing projects without taking a huge risk. Currently the Climate Investment Fund has gathered US$8 billion from 14 different countries and has invested in Climate-Smart Investments in 72 countries. About 57% of the projects that have been financed have been for the public sector while 43% of the projects have been for the private sector. There are four major factors of projects that the Climate Investment Fund focuses on: clean technology, climate resilience, energy access, and having sustainable forests.

=== Learning from Mega Disasters ===
Another joint venture from the World Bank and Japan is the Learning from Mega Disasters. The Great East Japan Earthquake (GEJE) was 9.0 earthquake which shook Japan, causing a tsunami and a nuclear power plant disaster. The World Bank and the government of Japan both learned from the earthquake on how other countries should prepare themselves from natural disasters. This information also was given to other countries so they could learn how to prepare for natural disasters before they happened and what to do after they occurred.

=== World Bank Institute (WBI) ===
Japan contributes to several different developing countries thanks to the help of the World Bank Institute, and their main focus is to help with initiatives that help developing countries prepare for natural disasters. Another initiative that Japan has focused with the help of the World Bank Institute is Universal Health Coverage.

=== Sustainable development bonds ===
Sustainable development bonds is another venture that involved Japan and the World Bank. Recently the World Bank gathered about $2 Billion for the Sustainable Development Bonds, thanks to Japanese investors who currently make up about 85% of the money coming from Japan. The main focus of these bonds is to tackle food waste.

== Relations with the United States ==
Japan and the United States have become economic and military defense allies. Recently, on April 10, 2024, the White House released a United States - Japan Joint Leader's Statement with U.S. President, Joe Biden, and Japan Prime Minister, Kishida Fumio, reaffirming the relationship between the two economic powers of the U.S. and Japan. The statement announces that the U.S. and Japan will continue to support technology projects and invest in programs to promote innovation and ensure economic security for both countries. Upholding this philosophy, Japan and the US continue to support the U.S.-Japan Competitiveness and Resilience (CoRe) Partnership along with many other initiatives including other global financing organizations and security programs.

Contributing over $800 billion to the United States and supporting over 800,000 jobs for Americans, Japan is the largest foreign investor of the U.S., and similarly, the United States is for Japan as well. Other initiatives of focus among the U.S. and Japan includes the Indo-Pacific Economic Framework for Prosperity (IPEF) and the G7 and Asia-Pacific Economic Cooperation (APEC) which focus on competition and inclusivity of global economies.
