= Precaria (country) =

Imaginary Country proposed by TECHO

Precaria is a concept suggested in the framework of the international campaign of the non-governmental organisation Un techo para mi país (TECHO), in English "A roof for my country", that designates allegorically an imaginary country which would be inhabited by all the poor people from Latin America, for pointing out the magnitude of this critical situation as opposed to the constitutional law of the region and the human rights system of international law (such as Bill of Human Rights and the Millennium Development Goals).

This term has been used by the Ambassadors of Precaria: the writer Isabel Allende, the former President of Chile Michelle Bachelet and Bernardo Kosakoff, former director of CEPAL, among others, to raise awareness of poverty in Latin America and to highlight the inadequacy of the indexes which assess the satisfaction of basic needs of the individual. Recently Bernardo Kliksberg, adviser of the UNDP and co-author of "The People First", co-authored with the Nobel Prize Laureate in Economics Amartya Sen, has joined the campaign "Precaria: a country that nobody knows" as a way to combat adequately poverty in the region.

This concept is used to distinguish the condition of poverty corresponding to a population of 180 million people, which would make it the second country-wide population of Latin America after Brazil. It is considered that its population is mestizo. Precaria has a population, among others, of "2 million Chileans, 1 million Costa Ricans, 6 million Bolivians, 4 million Nicaraguans and 5 million Hondurans". Several factors as the lack of access to fair opportunities for the poor people are not detected by traditional development indices. Therefore, within this paradigm an index of dignity is established, in accordance to the deserved respect to human dignity. Major problems in "Precaria" are the lack of drinking water and of basic sanitation services, and the lack of adequate housing.

For diminishing the borders of Precaria “Un techo para mi país” have reunited more than 400,000 volunteers and organise regular activities in almost all countries of the region. Consequently, civil society contributes with funds and volunteer work in order to build numerous houses in a short time in various towns and cities in Latin America.

== See also ==
- Poverty
- Economic crisis
