= Canaan massacre =

2023 massacre in Haiti

- Part of Haitian gang war
- Location: Canaan, Haiti
- Date: August 26, 2023
- Deaths: 20+
- Injuries: Dozens
- Victim: ~12 kidnapped
- Perpetrators: 5 Segonn; Marcorel Zidor (implicitly)

On August 26, 2023, militants from the 5 Segonn gang massacred civilians in the shantytown of Canaan, Haiti. At least 20 people were killed in the massacre.

== Background ==
Since the government's de facto collapse in 2018, Haiti's capital of Port-au-Prince has become a hotbed of anarchic gang activity with brutal murders and spates of killing. This was exacerbated in 2021 by the assassination of Jovenel Moïse, leading most of the gangs in Port-au-Prince to ally with G9 or G-Pep. During Ariel Henry's administration, following the death of Moise, seventy-eight police officers had been killed.

The gang 5 Segonn, led by a man named Johnson "Izo" Andre, rapidly rose in power after the death of Moise, climbing to 300 members. By 2023, the United Nations estimated it was one of the largest gangs in Haiti, controlling large swathes of the west coast and the RN-2 highway. The group controls Canaan, and calls itself the "Taliban of Canaan". The leader of Canaan's 5 Segonn is known as Jeff. Jeff had attacked Canaan residents part of Bwa kale, a self-defense group across the country.

== Massacre ==
On August 26, 2023, Pastor Marcorel Zidor of the Piscine de Bethesda Evangelical Church held a march against gang violence in Canaan, and against 5 Segonn's crimes against the population. Zidor had been known for inflammatory statements calling for violence against the gangs. Several hundred people took part in the protest, carrying machetes and sticks in self-defense. The protesters marched from an area called Tabarre towards Canaan. Zidor called on the residents to rise up against Jeff and 5 Segonn's rule, and attack the gangsters head on. Some police protected the protest earlier on, but left before the massacre. Haitian police released a statement saying that they had done everything they could to discourage Zidor from protesting.

The protesters yelled "Free Canaan". However, the gang members had assault rifles, and fired upon the crowd when they reached the gang's headquarters in an area called Rosenberg. Initial reports said that seven people were killed in the massacre, although the death toll later rose to at least 20. Dozens of protesters were injured. Around a dozen protesters were abducted by 5 Segonn gang members once they reached the headquarters. Videos proliferating on social media showed protesters lying in their own blood, and many with bullet wounds. Some of the worshippers knelt down and prayed, believing that the prayer could stop the bullets. The massacre was filmed by journalists at the scene.

== Aftermath ==
After the massacre, Zidor was summoned by a local court for putting people in the way of danger and sparking the massacre. The director of the Haitian Center for Analysis and Research, Gedeon Jean, accused Zidor's irresponsibility of perpetrating the massacre, as he knew that there was no police protection and the protesters were vulnerable to a massacre by the gangs.
