= Déjate Llevar =

Déjate Llevar may refer to:

== Films and television ==
- Déjate Llevar, the Spanish title of the 2006 film Take the Lead directed by Liz Friedlander, and starring Antonio Banderas

== Music ==
- Déjate Llevar, 2018 album by Catalina Palacios
- "Déjate Llevar", the Spanish version of the Ricky Martin song "It's Alright"
- "Déjate Llevar", 2006 song by the Spanish pop band La Oreja de Van Gogh
- "Déjate llevar", 2011 song by the Mexican band Reik from their 2011 album Peligro
- "Déjate Llevar", 2017 song by Juan Magán, Belinda, Manuel Turizo, Snova, B-Case
