= Canaan, Haiti =

Canaan
- Location in Haiti
- Coordinates: 18°38′46″N 72°16′23″W
- Country: Haiti
- Department: Ouest
- Arrondissement: Croix-des-Bouquets

Area
  - Total: 50 km^{2} (19 sq mi)

Population
  - Total: 20,000
  - Density: 400/km^{2} (1,000/sq mi)
- Time zone: UTC-5 (UTC)

Canaan is a suburb of Croix-des-Bouquets and Thomazeau in the outskirts of Port-au-Prince, Haiti. By 2016 an estimated population of 200,000 is settling in the about 50 square kilometers large territory that was expropriated in reaction to the devastating 2010 Haiti earthquake. Since 2010 earthquake victims that were fleeing the chaos in the adjacent Port-au-Prince neighborhoods, migrants from rural zones of Haiti and people profiting from the uncontrolled situation invested according to ONU-Habitat data more than 10 million US Dollar in the development of the "new city".

The Government of Haiti initially refused to recognize settlements like Canaan as permanent settlements and officially banned the construction of any permanent structures or the implementation of any infrastructure projects in the area. Over time, the de facto land ownership has become accepted and donors have funding projects including roads and water systems.

In June 2013, the BBC World Service's World Have Your Say had a radio programme on Canaan's explosive growth, interviewing a man there who described how people from other displacement camps around Haiti and even other long-term residents of other areas of Haiti were increasingly coming to Canaan despite its lack of running water (there are pump stations, around which there are often fights), lack of a permanent hospital, and lack of transportation options outside daylight hours. The same month, the BBC News website posted an article detailing many of the same concerns about Canaan in written form. The growth of Canaan is not expected to slow or cease in the near term.

In February 2015, USAID and its funding partner the American Red Cross (ARC) announce a two-year-long, approximately 14 Million US-Dollar activity—the Canaan Upgrading and Community Development / Ann Develope Canaan (Haitian Creole) Program—working closely with the Unité de Construction de Logements et de Bâtiments Publics (of the Office of the Prime Minister) to support the Government of Haiti's vision to promote equitable and resilient urban development in the Canaan zone.

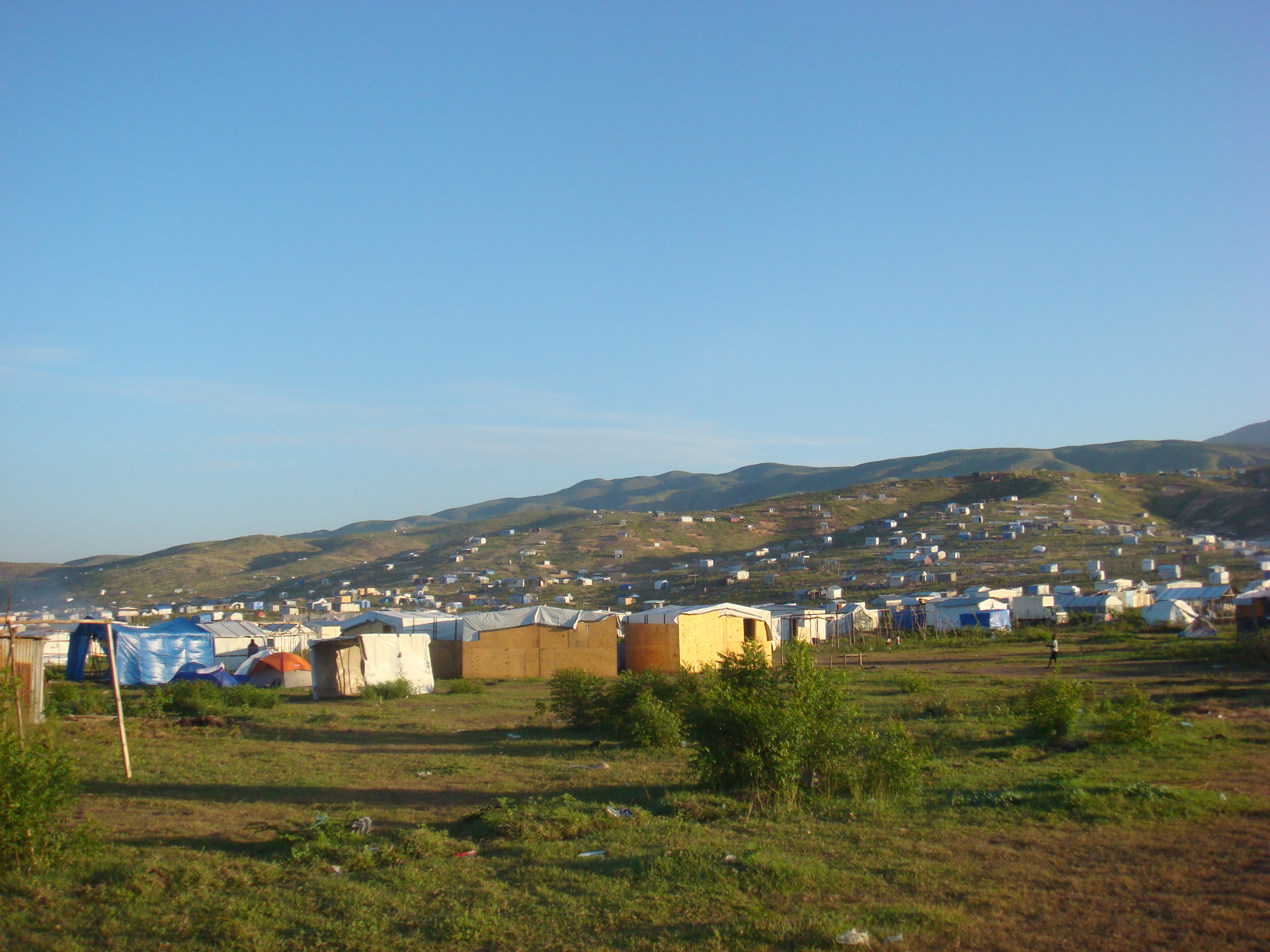
Canaan Haiti

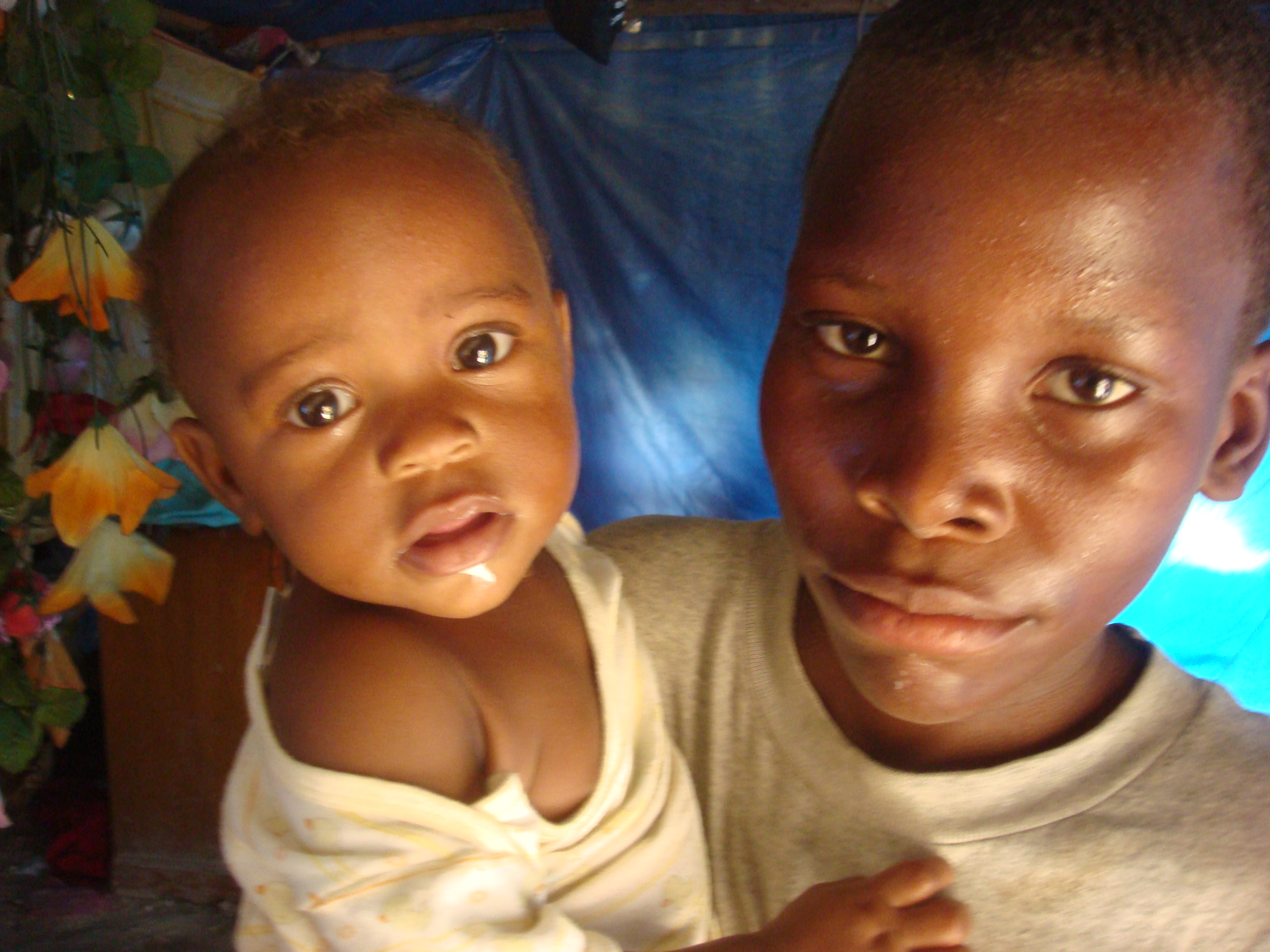
Canaan Children

== History ==
In January 2010, a magnitude 7 earthquake hit Haiti destroying most of its capital city, Port-au-Prince. The victims of the earthquake set up camps in the squares of the city where the Haitian Government, with the help of non-governmental organizations, provides food, water and sanitation services.

Some of the victims of the earthquake have been displaced to areas around the capital city due to the lack of resources. One of these areas is Canaan which is located a few kilometers northeast of Port-au-Prince at the beginning of route 1 which leads to the North of Haiti. Canaan is a large area where the victims have set up temporary homes, usually made from tarp. There is no community organization yet and the tents are being set up in any free space. Canaan lacks the basic community services, with no schools except for a few abandoned UNICEF tents that are also used as churches by Canaan residents. There are no medical or health services available in the area. The residents of Canaan rely on the assistance of United Nations personnel who regularly patrol the zone.

== Non-governmental organizations in Canaan ==
=== TECHO ===
Un Techo para mi País, an international non-governmental organization founded in Chile, is working in Canaan to replace the tents with modular transitional houses. The organization has built more than 800 houses in Canaan with the help of volunteers from Haiti, various parts of Latin America, and the United States. In July and August 2010 a group of volunteers composed of staff from the World Bank, the Inter-American Development Bank and the Organization of American States travelled to Canaan to join their efforts. The volunteers built 300 houses and raised awareness of the opportunities and challenges in this settlement as well as made connections with programs that have successfully funded projects in post-disaster situations and fragile states such as the Japan Social Development Fund (JSDF), the Global Facility for Disaster Reduction and Recovery (GFDRR), and the Haiti Reconstruction Fund which was set up in partnership with the international community and the government of Haiti after the earthquake.

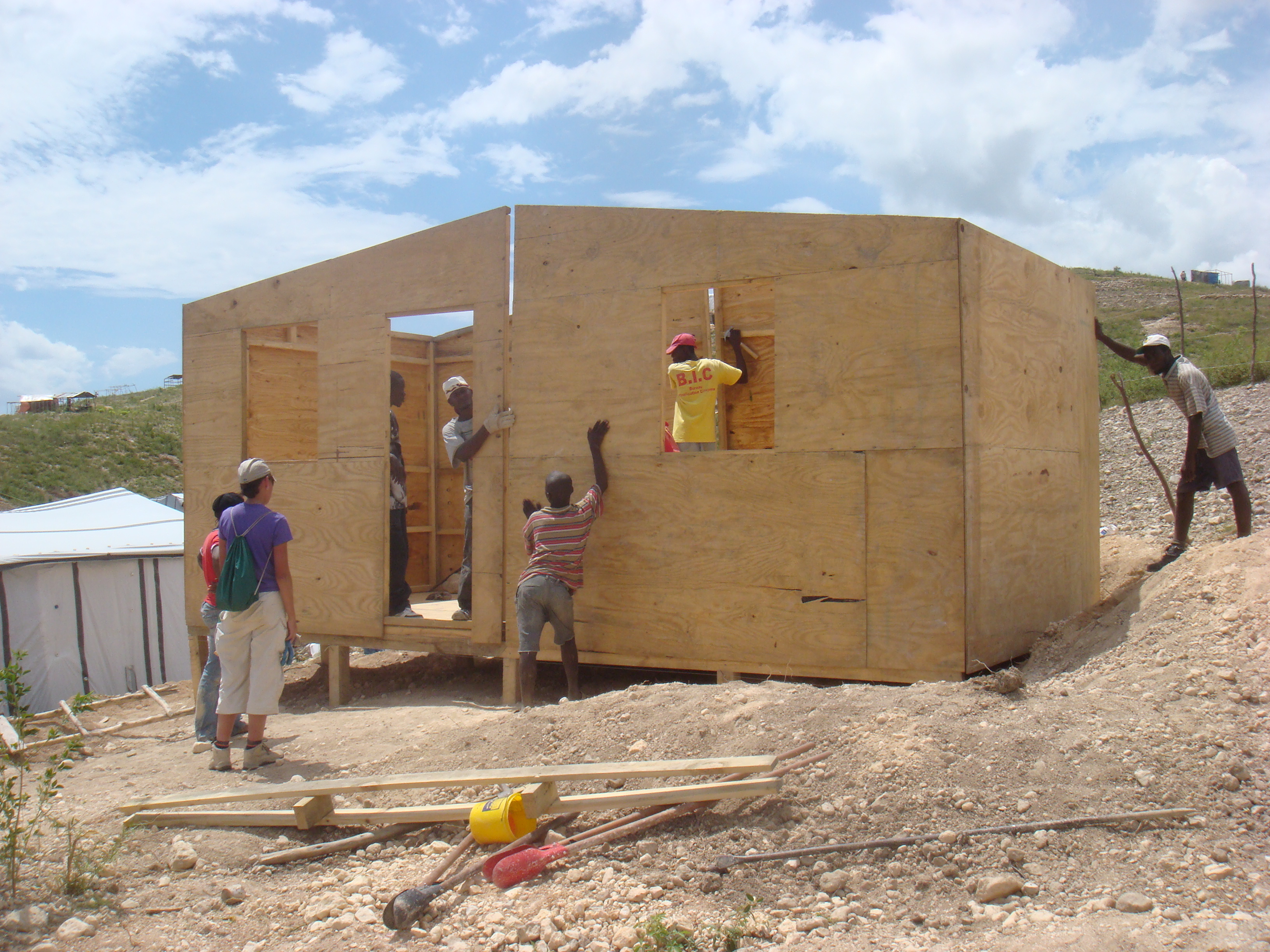
House built by Techo volunteers

=== Canaan Orphanage – Malnutrition Initiative ===
The malnutrition initiatives put therapeutic medicated food in the hands of mothers to treat children with malnutrition. The food product is Peanut Butter medicine, which comes in a bag and has all the vitamins, minerals, fats and oils that a child needs in those critical years of development. The program picks an area and identifies malnourished children by way of weight, screenings and height and weight ratios as well as measurement of the arms to assess the level of malnutrition. The clinic staff provides food to the mother and evaluates their progress in the following weeks.

=== Medical Teams International ===
Medical Teams International (MTI) provided basic medical care to the residents of Canaan from 2011 to 2013, and transitioned services to a local partner, Jesus Le Vraj Chemin (JLVC), which operates a primary care clinic.

== Academic Research and Intervention in Canaan ==
Canaan has been in the focus of different universities and academic institutions. PhD students undertake research in the different sections respectively neighborhoods of Canaan. The governmental entity Unité de Construction de Logements et de Bâtiments Publics (Housing and Public Building Unit), USAID, ONU-Habitat Haïti, as well as the American Red Cross (ACR) together with the local partner the Haitian Red Cross collect the different available data and research results.

=== Technical University of Munich ===
Since October 2012, Master's students of the Technical University of Munich (TUM) in cooperation with the volunteer organization TECHO Haïti have been performing extensive research in Onaville, the most eastern part of Canaan. The topics of research performed by the research platform Urban Strategies for Onaville, Haiti (TUM-USO) have been: flooding risk of Ravine Madanièl (Ravine Lan Couline) and integrated water management, infrastructure mapping, participatory urban development strategies, urban design, locally adapted gardening techniques, etc. Research results are shared with key actors from Haitian Government and the "International Community", non-governmental organizations, local administration, and especially with local leaders and residents. In field workshops findings have been brought back to the community and verified. Improved flood risk modelling and testing of flood protection infrastructure variants performed based on UAV-Data from Humanitarian OpenStreetMap and IOM GIS-Unit revealed that Onaville and Canaan is exposed to high flooding risk: In a 100-year event, over 3200 buildings (about 15,000 persons – when stating average Haitian household size of 4.5 persons) would be affected by the powerful flows of Ravine Madanièl. A 5-year event would still endanger about 350 houses and shacks (about 1,600 persons).

== Opportunities ==
=== Ann Develope Canaan / Canaan Upgrading and Community Development Program ===
In February 2015, USAID and its funding partner the American Red Cross (ARC) announce a two-year-long, approximately 14 Million US-Dollar activity—the Canaan Upgrading and Community Development or Ann Develope Canaan (Haitian Creole) Program—working closely with the Government of Haiti's Unité de Construction de Logements et de Bâtiments Publics within the Office of the Prime Minister, to support the Government of Haiti's vision to promote equitable and resilient urban development in the Canaan zone.

"Specifically, USAID is seeking to support achievement of the following results:

1. A better functioning and more resilient urban area created through carefully planned neighborhood upgrading and urban management initiatives.
2. A more dynamic and equitable livelihoods sector fostered by reducing market barriers and inefficiencies and stimulating new economic opportunities in Canaan.

The program will also operate at two geographic scales

1. A “pilot neighborhood” where the implementing partner will engage in more intensive infrastructure upgrades/investments and
2. The larger Canaan zone, where a broader set of small-scale infrastructure, urban management, and targeted livelihoods interventions will take place."

Involved Actors:

- Unité de Construction de Logements et de Bâtiments Publics
- USAID
- American Red Cross
- ONU-Habitat Haïti/UN-Habitat
- Global Communities Haïti

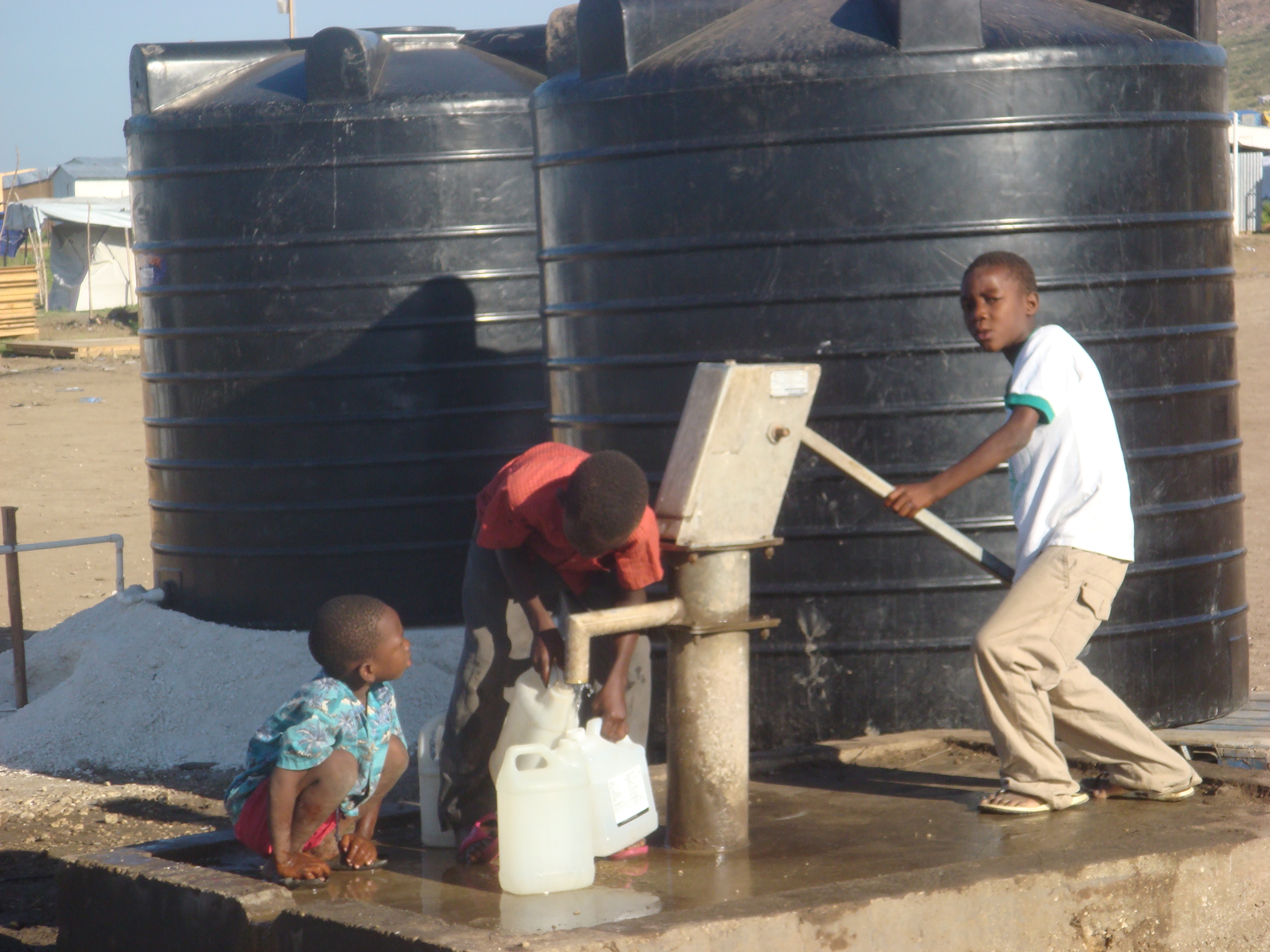
Water pump in Canaan
