= King Juan Carlos University =

University from Spain

Rey Juan Carlos University
- Universidad Rey Juan Carlos
- Motto: Non nova, sed nove ("Not new, but in a new way")
- Type: Public
- Established: 8 July 1996
- Affiliations: CRUE, TPC, CGU
- Rector: Javier Ramos
- Administrative staff: 1,904
- Students: 45,458 (2017)
- Location: Madrid, Community of Madrid, Spain
- Campus: Móstoles, Alcorcón, Fuenlabrada, Vicálvaro and Aranjuez
- Colors
- Nickname: URJC
- Website: www.urjc.es

Rey Juan Carlos University (RJC University) (Spanish: Universidad Rey Juan Carlos, URJC) is a Spanish public research university located in the southern area of the Community of Madrid (Spain), with five campuses at Móstoles, Alcorcón, Vicálvaro, Aranjuez and Fuenlabrada.

It is named after former king Juan Carlos I of Spain and has the Latin motto Non nova, sed nove ("Not new things, but in a new way"). It was established in 1996 by the government of the Community of Madrid.

With 44,916 students, it is the second-biggest public university in the Community of Madrid, behind the historical Universidad Complutense. URJC is one of eight universities in the Community of Madrid, and it is the second-newest university in the autonomous community.

== Studies ==
King Juan Carlos University offers a range of degrees, all adapted to the European Higher Education Area. This includes 64 undergraduate degrees, 44 dual degrees, 6 English-medium degrees, 6 university degrees on-line, 18 diplomas, and 8 engineering degrees, as well as a wide range of official master's (81) and doctoral programs involving both degrees and training (34) in health sciences, experimental sciences and technology, communication sciences, and law and social sciences. King Juan Carlos University has five campuses in Madrid, Fuenlabrada, Móstoles, Aranjuez and Vicálvaro, as well as a foundation whose headquarters are on Madrid's Plaza de Manuel Becerra.

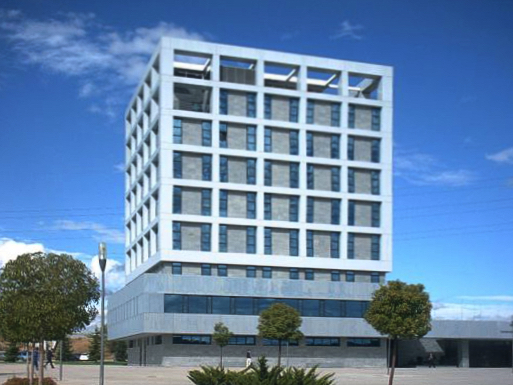
URJC rectorate in Móstoles

== Campus ==
The URJC is divided into four campuses. Each campus is composed of one or more schools:

- Móstoles Campus is, since 1998, the headquarters of the School of Experimental Sciences and Technology (ESCET) and since 2007 the School of Computer Engineering (ETSII). It also houses the University Senate and the office of the President (Rector).
- Alcorcón Campus houses the Faculty of Health Sciences since 1997 and the University Hospital URJC.
- Vicálvaro Campus (Madrid) is the seat of the Faculty of Juridical and Social Sciences (FCJS) since 1998.
- Fuenlabrada Campus houses since 2000, the Faculty of Communication Sciences and School of Tourism, which since November 2009 was renamed the Faculty of Tourism, and since 2005 the School of Telecommunications Engineering (ETSIT), renamed in 2023 as Fuenlabrada School of Engineering (EIF).

Each school or college is governed by a Dean or School Director, and is divided into academic departments.

=== Affiliated centres ===
- Institute of Commercial Management and Marketing in Somosaguas (Madrid).
- ESERP School (Madrid).

=== Colleges ===
- Higher Institute of Dance Alicia Alonso (Fuenlabrada).
- Institute of Humanities (Vicálvaro).
- Institute of International Legal Studies (Vicálvaro).

=== University Centres ===
- University Language Centre (Vicálvaro), which regularly gives courses in English, French, German, Italian, Chinese and Spanish for foreigners.
- Emile Noël Research and Documentation Centre of the European Union (Vicálvaro).
- Volunteering and Cooperation Centre (Alcorcón).
- University Centre for Applied Social Studies (Vicálvaro).
- Economics Study Centre in Madrid (Vicálvaro).
- Centre for Latin American Studies (Móstoles).
- Centre for the Study of the Olympic Movement (Vicálvaro).
- Centre for Intelligent Information Technologies and Applications (CETINIA).
- Business Incubator (Vicálvaro).
- Legal Office (Vicálvaro).
- Technology Support Centre (Móstoles).
- Centre for Innovation, Technology Transfer and Knowledge (Móstoles).
- Laboratory Network URJC (REDLABU).
- Centre of Research and Teaching, located in the so-called Nuncio's Palace in Aranjuez.

== Academic programs ==
Studies include computer science, telecommunications engineering, chemical engineering, environmental science, odontology, medicine, nursing, physiotherapy, audiovisual communication, telecommunications, tourism, journalism, law, economics, applied economics including Austrian economics, business administration and management, sociology, history, accounting and finance, marketing, food science and technology, biology, psychology, preschool education, international relations, visual arts and dance, and criminology, among others.

== Gallery ==
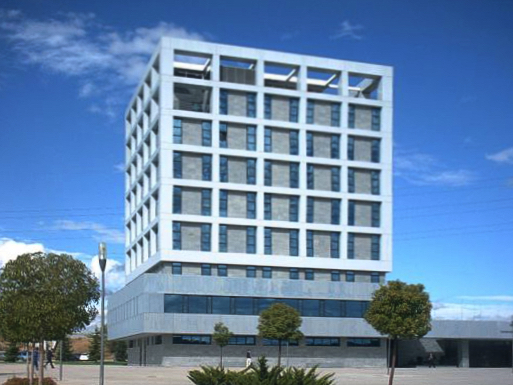
URJC Rectorate Building

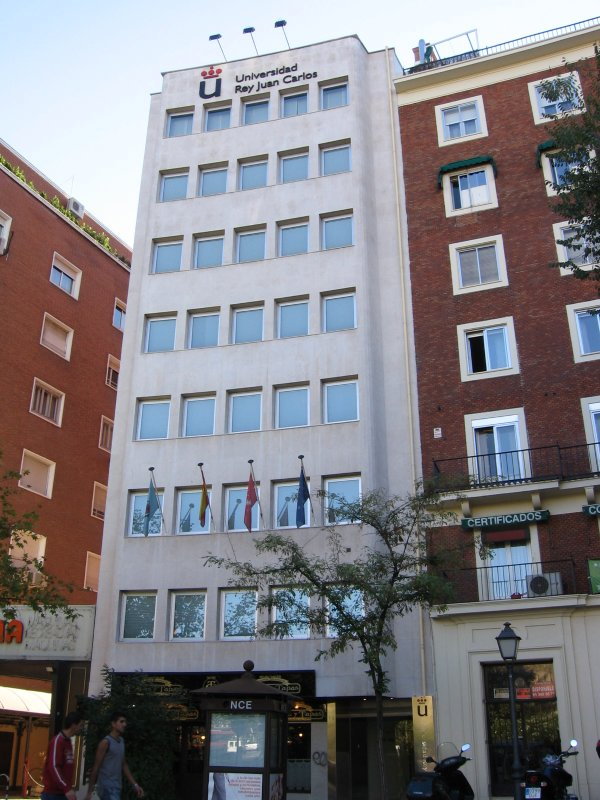
URJC Building located in Manuel Becerra Square in Madrid

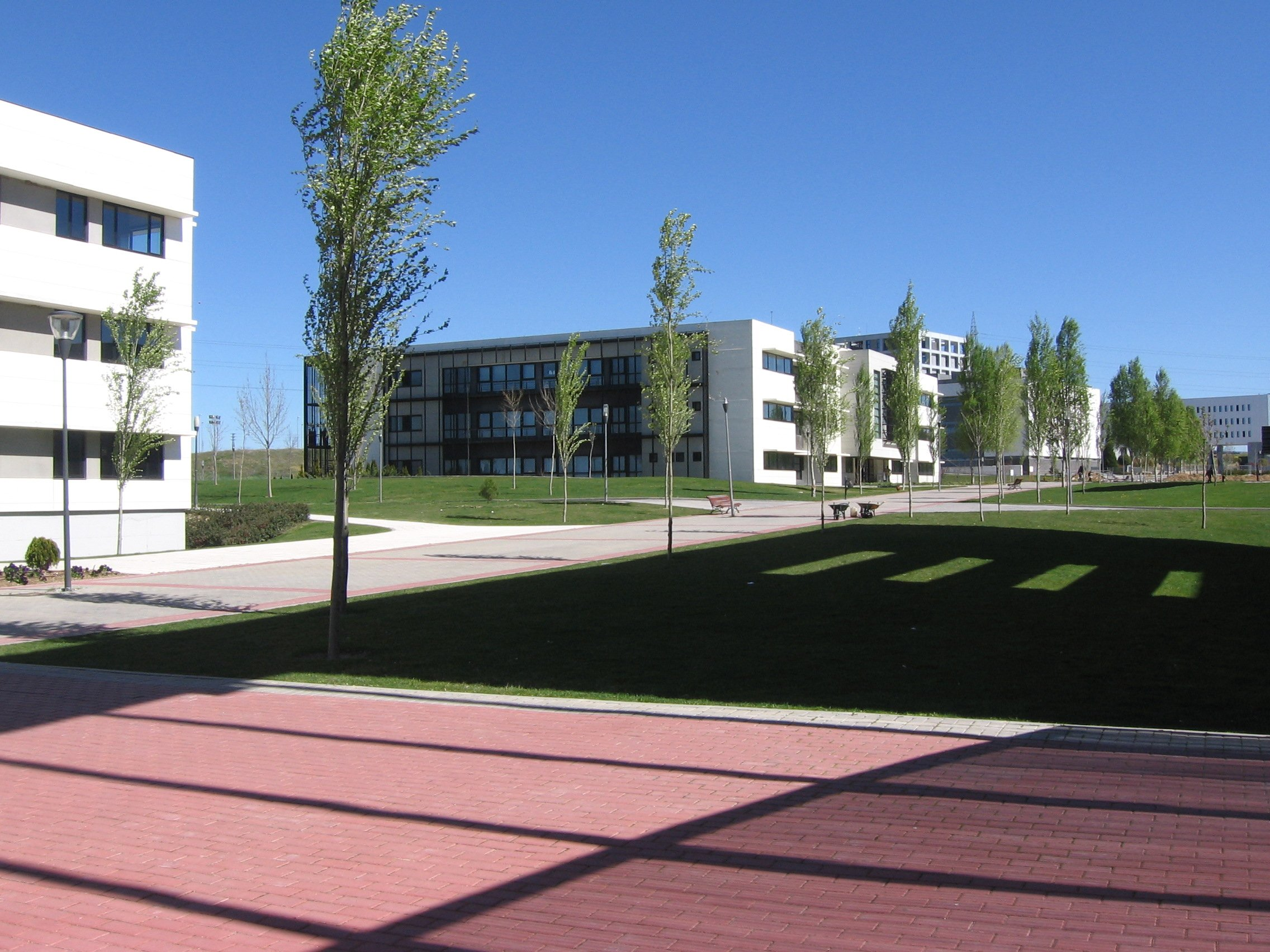
1st Department Building, Móstoles Campus

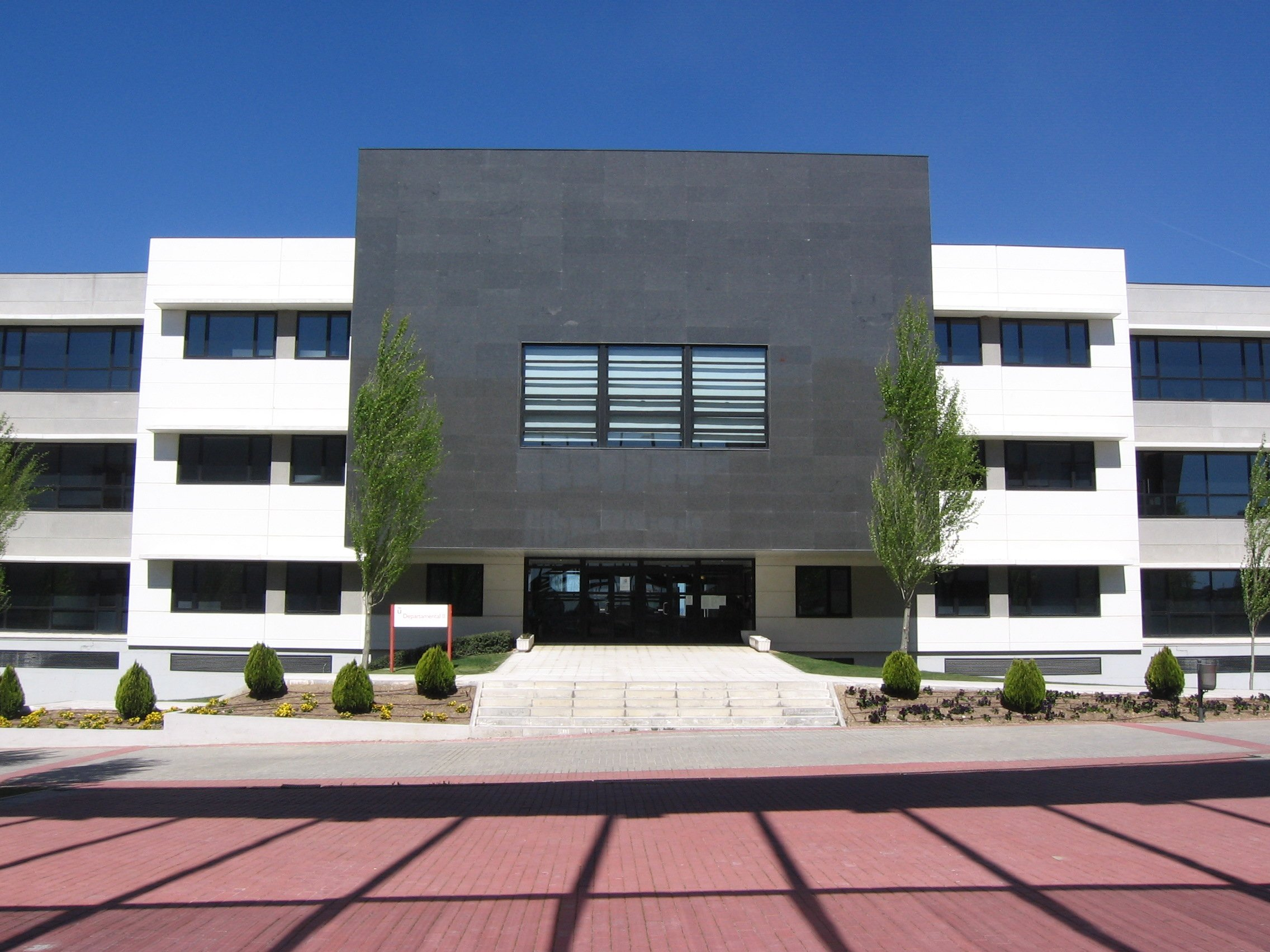
2nd Department Building, Móstoles Campus

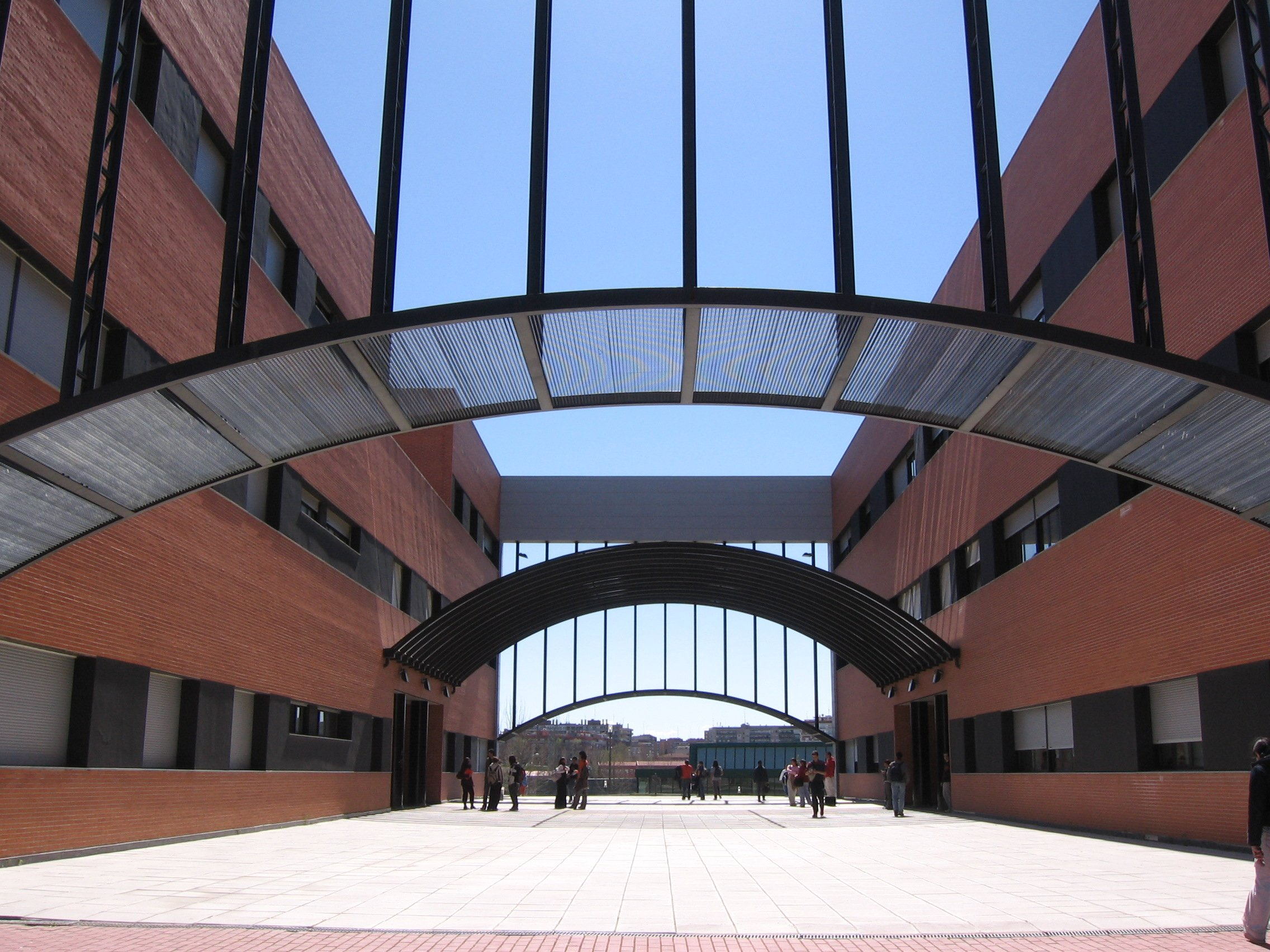
2nd Classroom Building (right) and 2nd Laboratory Building (left), Móstoles Campus

== Honorary doctorates ==
In 2007 Juan Velarde Fuertes, Iñaki Gabilondo, Luis del Olmo and Antonio Mingote were awarded honorary doctorates from King Juan Carlos University. In January 2008, Bernardo Kliksberg became the first foreigner to receive an honorary doctorate degree from the university along with Jaime Gil Aluja, José Antonio Pastor Ridruejo and Fernando Sánchez Calero. In 2011, honorary doctorates were awarded to Harald zur Hausen, Ramón Tamames and Peter Waldmann.

In 2014 James A. Yorke, distinguished University Professor of Mathematics and Physics at the University of Maryland and recipient of the 2003 Japan Prize in Science and Technology, was awarded an honorary doctorate from King Juan Carlos University. Prof. Yorke is known worldwide for the definition of the mathematical term "chaos" in 1975. Rodrigo Rato, former managing director of the IMF and Spanish Deputy Prime Minister, previously held an honorary doctorate from King Juan Carlos University, which was not immediately canceled when he was later sentenced to 4½ years' imprisonment for bank fraud in his role as chairman of bank Bankia.
