= Mediagua =

Chilean prefabricated house type

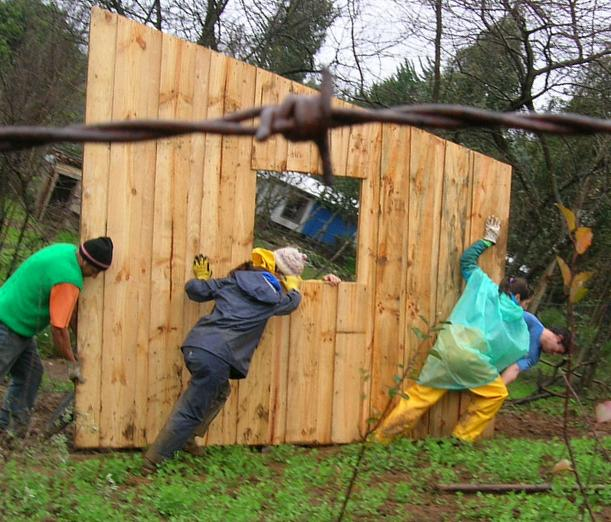
A group of volunteers of Un Techo para Chile building a mediagua

Mediagua is the name given in Chile to a type of prefabricated house, constructed of wood panels, which can be erected in less than a day. The traditional model has an area of 18 square metres (190 sq ft).

They are traditionally used to provide emergency housing solutions after natural disasters, or to give an inexpensive house to homeless people.

Because they are designed as temporary solutions they are commonly installed without sanitation or electricity, but often they become permanent homes.

== Elements ==
A standard mediagua, such as those installed by the housing foundation Un Techo para Chile ("A Roof for Chile") is of 6.1 metres (20 ft) long by 3 metres (9.8 ft) wide, which is designed to house a family of 4. There is also a model of half the area of the former, for single people and couples.

They are made of 8 panels (2 floors, 2 sides, 2 front and 2 rear), two windows, one door, 8 sheets of zinc for the roof, plus 15 support logs of 80 centimetres (2.6 ft) long to isolate the house from the moisture of the soil. The house is divided in two rooms.

== History ==
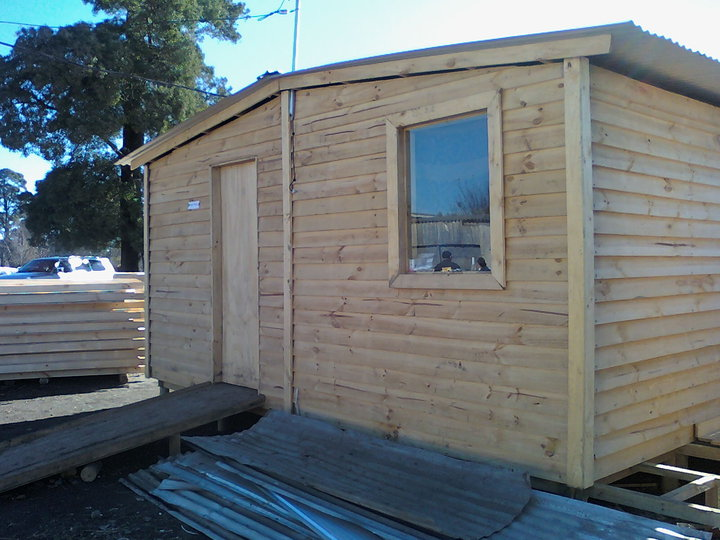
A mediagua built by PDI-members for homeless after the 2010 earthquake

In the mid-nineteenth century the first slums began to appear around Santiago de Chile, where unskilled workers lived. The sanitation, safety and housing were deplorable. The houses were built with waste materials. The conditions had not changed by 1960. At that time groups associated with the Jesuits began to build mediaguas for poor people. In 1962 the Hogar de Cristo (Home of Christ) Foundation (founded by St. Alberto Hurtado) built 1000 mediaguas, and by 2010 they had built over 400,000 mediaguas in total.

Mediaguas were built by the government to house the victims of the earthquakes in Valdivia (1960), La Ligua (1965), Santiago (1985) and Tocopilla (2007).

After the 2010 Chile earthquake the housing foundation Un Techo para Chile ("A Roof for Chile") started a national campaign that raised the money to build more than 40,000 mediaguas for the victims.
