= Giammarco Menga =

Italian sports journalist (born 1990)

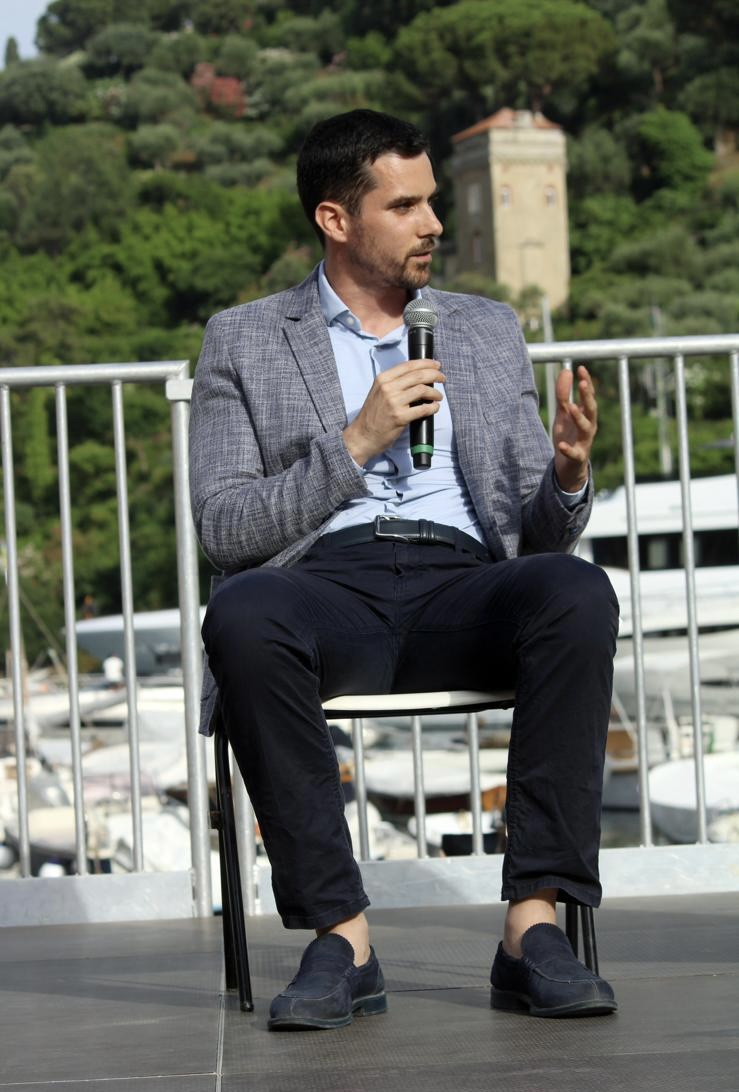
- Born: 11 November 1990 (age 35); Sulmona, Italy
- Employer: Mediaset

Giammarco Menga (born 11 November 1990) is an Italian sports journalist and author.

== Early life and education ==
Menga had his graduation from Liceo Scientifico dell'Aquila and then joined the Faculty of Literature at the Sapienza University of Rome and obtained a degree course in Modern Literature, publishing and journalism.

== Career ==
Giammarco had his television debut at the age of 11 at Teleabruzzo. He then worked with laQtv, Tvsei and wrote for IlCentro newspaper, writing about sports. Giammarco got an opportunity to present his book at Mediaset in 2016 and later joined them as a sports correspondent in central and southern Italy. He worked at SportsMediaset for three years as a journalist, envoy and as a specialist on the football transfer market. He also worked with Premium Sports and for Mattino Cinque for the morning programme on Canale 5. Since 2016, Menga has been a press officer and video reporter for the Zanetti Football Training Camp.

During the years 2021 and 2022 he was a reporter for the TV programs Quarto grado and Dritto e rovescio broadcast on Rete 4. He has also been a reporter for the program Gioco Sporco - I misteri dello sport (Italia 1, 2023-2024)

He is co-author of the autobiography of Bruno Conti, Un gioco da ragazzi, published in March 2022 by Rizzoli Libri and with the introduction by Francesco Totti.

In summer of 2023 the book was the winner of the Premio Selezione Bancarella Sport, arriving as the second classified in the final. The next September, the book was the winner of the Premio Grandi Lettori at the competition of sport literature Invictus.

In 2024 he published the book: Il delitto di Saman Abbas. Il coraggio di essere libere, edited by the Newton Compton editors. Il the book it is narrated the murder of Saman Abbas, an 18-years-old Pakistan girl, killed during the night between the 30th Aprile and the 1st May 2021 at Novellara, from the beginning until the processual developments.

The volume has also been presented at the Senate of the Republic (Italy) and inserted within a project of sensibilization on the violence of genre in italian schools with the patronage of Carabinieri.

== Publications and documentaries ==
- Sportivamente D'Annunzio (2016) ISBN 8864022821
- Sportivamente d’Annunzio – Focus Mediaset (2019)
- Il Postino sogna sempre 2 volte - Short Film (Veleno Production, 2019)
- Il Vate armato - Focus (2020)
- Il delitto di Saman Abbas. Il coraggio di essere libere, edited by the New Compton (2024)

== Awards ==
- 51st Coni Award at Literary Competition for special reports in Non-Fiction Category for writing Sportivamente D’Annunzio, 2019
- Best emerging Sports Journalist in Andrea Fortunato National Award., December 2021
- Best young correspondent 2020 at "Giuseppe Luconi" National Journalism Award.
- Premio Nazionale of Journalism "Angelo Maria Palmieri", Junior Category, 2013
- Trofeo Pegasus Literary Awards, with the essay Sportivamente d'Annunzio, 2022
- Inviato dell'anno, Lifestyle Awards, 2022
- Winner of the 2023 Premio Selezione Bancarella Sport with “Un gioco da ragazzi” together with Bruno Conti.
- Winner of the 2023 Grandi Lettori Premio letterario sportivo Invictus with "Un gioco da ragazzi" together with Bruno Conti
- Winner of the Premio Speciale della Giuria valutatrice at Concorso Letterario Sportivo Internazionale Pietro Mennea with the book Un gioco da ragazzi, 2024.
- Premio Internazionale Nassiriya per la Pace 2024, assigned for the social commitment showed in the case of Saman as reporter and writer. The prize is patronized by the Presidency of the Council of Ministers (Italy) and by the Ministry of Defence (Italy), prize given on 12 March 2025.
- Premio Giornalismo Euromediterraneo 2025
- Miglior saggio 2025 al Premio Letterario Internazionale San Domenichino con Il delitto di Saman Abbas
- Premio letterario Casentino 2025 “Giustizia narrata” con il delitto di Saman Abbas
