= Bernardo Kliksberg =

Argentine economist

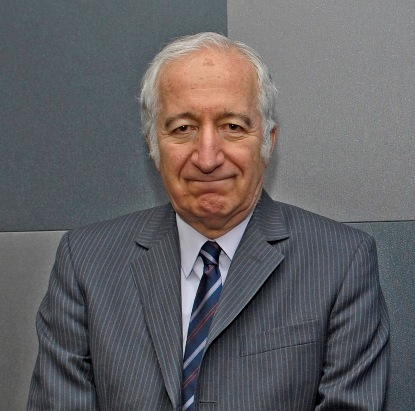
- Father of Social Management. Pioneer of Ethics for development and Business Social Responsibility UN Special Advisor, Member of the Steering Committee of the High Level Panel of Experts on Food Security and Nutrition (HLPE), International Consultant
- Born: 1940 (age 85–86); Buenos Aires, Argentina

Academic work
- Discipline: Economist

Bernardo Kliksberg (Buenos Aires, 1940) is an Argentine Doctor of Economics, recognized around the world as the founder of a new discipline, social management, and a pioneer of development ethics, social capital and corporate social responsibility. His books, papers, advisory work, and research, applies an interdisciplinary approach integrating contributions of different social sciences.

He is considered a "World authority on poverty issues" (Pagina/12, Argentina, 29/12/13), "A world guru in corporate social responsibility" (Cinco Días, Spain, 12/11/12), "one of the chief experts in the world in the fight against poverty" (Buenos Aires Económico, October 27, 2010), a "corporate social responsibility global guru" (La Prensa, Panama, November 9, 2010), and "a tireless champion of ethics and economic and social inequality reduction" (Valor, Brazil May 27, 2010).

Kliksberg is the author of 56 books and hundreds of works on critical areas of development, corporate social responsibility, senior management, social capital, the fight against poverty, ethics and economics. He has been invited by Governments, corporation, civil society organizations and Universities around the world to give thousands of lectures on his ideas. Invited by China he lectures there in December 2012. One of his recent books was published in Mandarin. He gave the Braibant Honor lecture at the International Congress on Administrative Sciences (IIAS, Mexico, June 20, 2012).

He has been awarded dozens of honorary doctorate by universities in multiple countries. Among them the Jerusalem Hebrew University (June 2012), King Juan Carlos University of Spain, San Marcos University of Peru, Buenos Aires University, Nueva Leon University of Mexico, the Catholic University of Salta (UCASAL) and the University of Costa Rica. He was awarded the University of Buenos Aires' Gold Medal, and the Diploma of Honor twice. The Buenos Aires University, the Catholic University of Salta and the National University Jose C.Paz established the Bernardo Kliksberg Chair.

Awarded at 2013, by Caritas, AMIA, and Argentine leaders civil society organizations with the Solidarity Prize, among other distinctions, King Juan Carlos I of Spain has awarded him the Order of Merit, the City of Buenos Aires has named him an Illustrious Citizen, the University of Buenos Aires has paid tribute to him by naming him a "Great Professor", and Guatemala has bestowed its Presidential Medal, Argentine Senate gave him his highest honor, the Domingo Faustino Sarmiento award (October 2012).

Laurete Argentine education channel Encuentro, produced two series of 25 chapters each on his thinking, "The Kilksberg Report". It was distinguished by the Parliament, both branches, replicated by Uruguay National TV, and in replaying process by TV channels of Mexico, Peru, Costa Rica, Bolivia and Paraguay.

In September 2013, he was appointed by the Committee on World Food Security (CFS) as a member of the Steering Committee of the High Level Panel of Experts on Food Security and Nutrition (HLPE), that is integrated by 15 "prominent experts" selected by their merits.

== Career ==
Bernardo Kliksberg holds five university degrees, two of which are PhDs. He is a Doctor of Economics and Administrative Science, and holds MBa's Degrees in Sociology, Administration and Public Accountant. In every case, he graduated with the highest possible honors.

Kliksberg is currently the Special Advisor to the United Nations Development Programme's (UNDP) Bureau for Political Development. He is President of the Ibero-American Network of Universities for Corporate Social Responsibility (composed of 250 universities from 23 different countries), President of the Latin-American network of Universities for Social Entrerpreneurship (integrated by 100 Universities of 15 countries). Member of the Advisory Committee of the International Institute for Peace, created by Rutgers University and Unesco, President of the center for business social responsibility and social capital of Buenos Aires University.

He is the General Director of the program for development of young professor in economics and management for an "economy with a human face", established in 27 Argentine universities, in Peru, and in Uruguay, and General Director of the new international program for preparation of young leaders established by Buenos Aires University and CAF Latin-American Development Bank in South American and Andean countries.

He has been an advisor to more than 30 countries and many international organizations, among them the UN, UNDP, UNESCO, UNICEF, the International Labour Organization, the World Health Organization, the Organization of American States and the Pan American Health Organization.

He is the Chief Advisor (on a volunteer bases) for the NGO TECHO, which has built eighty thousand homes for families in extreme poverty, is on the ground in nineteen countries, and has four hundred thousand young volunteers.

His most recent works are "Ethics for CEOS" (2013, four editions, translated into English), "How to fight poverty and inequality" (2013), the international best seller "People first" (19 editions) written with the Nobel Laurete in Economics, Amartya Sen, "Social enterpreunership" (2012), "Escándalos Eticos" (declared to be of cultural interest by the Legislature of The City of Buenos Aires, six editions), and "Más ética, mas desarrollo" (19 editions).

Bernardo Kliksberg has been married to Ana Kaul since 1973. He is the father of three children and has six grandchildren. Born in Buenos Aires, he currently lives in New York City.

== His work ==
Kliksberg has pioneered new ways of thinking about development. Among other things, he is considered one of the forerunners corporate social responsibility. He is considered to be an authority on social capital, a field with managerial, economic, and social applications.

He is considered the creator of a new discipline, social management, which has spread throughout all of Latin America, and is widely applied in the fight against poverty. Europa Press stated that Kliksberg" is considered to be the pioneer of "social management", in which the ethical dimension of the person is given priority in order to eradicate poverty". Furthermore, he is the founder of the United Nations' social management training program, which was the first of its kind in any international organization.

He is also recognized as one of the leaders of innovative thinking regarding state reform, public administration, civil service and the training of top public officials. He was the General Rapporteur of several International Congress of the International Institute on Administrative Sciences of Brussels. He was the Braibant Honor lecturer on the International Congress of Administrative Sciences (20 June 2012, Mexico) attended by 2000 delegates of 80 countries.

He has been the Chief Advisor to the Regional Bureau for Latin America and the Caribbean of the United Nations Development Programme (UNDP), the Director of the Spain-UNDP Trust Fund "Towards an integrated and inclusive development in Latin America and the Caribbean", and the Director of United Nations Regional Project for state modernization (UN-CLAD).

He has been an adviser at the highest levels of governments, as well as to business and social leaders in over 30 countries, in the fields of corporate social responsibility, economic development, the modernization of the state, social management, the fight against poverty and social capital development.

Kliksberg has founded several international institutions that have had a great impact on Latin America's development in key areas. One of these is the Latin American Center for Development Administration, which he co-founded in 1975 with the sponsorship of the United Nations. He co-founded (2008) and is the President of the Ibero-American Universities network for business social responsibility, integrated by 250 Universities of 23 countries, he was the co-founder and is the President of the Latin-American network of Universities for social entrepreneurship, integrated by 75 Universities, of 15 countries, and sponsorshiped by Porticus Foundation of Netherlands.

He has been an advisor to the UN, UNDP, UNESCO, UNICEF, ILO, WHO, OAS, PAHO and other international agencies. He has coordinated the Development of Public Sector Management Capacity in Latin America Program of the UN's Global Division for Public Administration and Development Management, was an advisor to the General Director of the Pan American Health Organization, and was a member of the Advisory Committee of the Argentina, Peru and Latin-American Human Development Reports prepared by the UNDP.

He was appointed member of the Advisory Council of the Global Conference on the Social Determinants of Health, established by World Health Organization, and member of the High Level Advisory Commission created by United Nations Volunteers to prepare the First Global Report on Volunteerism.

His op-ed pieces are frequently published in some of the most prominent Spanish-language media outlets, such as Madrid's El País and Cinco Días, Buenos Aires' Pagina 12, La Nación, Clarín, Montevideo's La República, Caracas' El Universal, Costa Rica La Nación, Tiempo Latino, The Washington Post, Perú Gestión, and the Spanish edition of Foreign Policy.

== Research ==
He is the author of 55 books and hundreds of papers on various areas of development, corporate social responsibility, senior management, social capital, the fight against poverty, ethics and economics. They are widely read internationally, and a lot of them are required reading in many universities.

Some of his works are considered classics and groundbreaking in the aforementioned areas, such as El Pensamiento Organizativo (more than 14 editions), Pobreza. Un tema impostergable (five editions), Hacia una economía con rostro humano (12 editions in Spanish and Portuguese) and Más ética, más desarrollo (19 editions, translated into Portuguese), "People first" with Amartya Sen (19 editions, translated into Portuguese and mandarin), and "Escándalos Eticos" (9 editions). He has been translated into English, French, Russian, Chinese, Arabic, Hebrew and Portuguese.

== Teaching ==
Kliksberg has worked extensively to train future generations of Latin American professors in the areas that he has pioneered.

He is the current chair of la Universidad Nacional de Buenos Aires' CENARSECS, an institution dedicated to the systematic promotion of corporate social responsibility.

He is the founder and president of the innovative and successful program "100 outstanding youths for an ethical development".

According to the Argentine daily La Nación, this is a high-level training experience designed to educate new generations of public and private managerial leaders in the new disciplines, and to do so from a perspective where ethics and accountability are core values. Kliksberg has described this program as a "crusade to make this a world where ethics and development go hand in hand. A training program for young teachers committed to the public interest". The program has been declared to be of cultural interest by the Congress of the Argentine Republic (2010), and is replicated in 27 Argentine Universities, and in top Universities of Perú, and Uruguay. He design and chaired the new international program "UNASUR youth leaders for a social economy and regional integration" (2012), established by Buenos Aires University and CAF, Latin-American Development Bank, which is training new leaders in all the South American and Andean countries.

== Other activities ==
Kliksberg is a member of the editorial board of several major scientific journals focused on developmental issues in Latin America, the United States and other countries. Among them: the Fundação Getúlio Vargas’ Revista de Administração Pública of Brazil, the CIDE’s Gestión y Política Pública in Mexico, La Revista Venezolana de Gerencia, Colombia's Cuadernos Latinoamericanos de Administración (Chair of the Editorial Board), Reforma y Democracia, Revista del Centro Latinoamericano de Administración para el Desarrollo, and La Revista Venezolana de Ciencias Sociales.

He has been appointed to the Editorial Board of the International Review of Administrative Sciences by the International Institute of Administrative Sciences (Brussels), which brings together more than one hundred of the world's countries. He is also a member of the Editorial Board of the University of Tel Aviv's Journal of Interdisciplinary Latin American and Caribbean Studies, and the Editorial Board of the University of Colorado's Comparative Technology Transfer and Society.

Aside from his involvement in the scientific, international advisory and teaching fields, Kliksberg does a large amount of volunteer work for various community service and civil society organizations. He is the Chief Advisor to "A Roof for my Country", which has a presence in nineteen countries, chair of AMIA's (Argentine Jewish main institution) Social Policy Advisory Committee in Buenos Aires, a member of the Academic Committee of Uruguay's Latin American Center for Human Economy, on the Board of Directors of Argentina's Fundación Tzedaka, Emeritus Member of the Foundations for the people of Puerto Rico, and chair of the international academics counsel of the Social and Economic Forum.

=== Recognition and awards ===
Bernardo Kliksberg is a recognized authority in the field of development. The Argentine daily Página 12 described him as "the greatest Latin American expert on poverty". The Brazilian magazine Valor said that he is "a tireless defender of ethics and social and economic inequality reduction", while Paraguay's La Nación stated that he is considered "an economics guru" around the world, and the daily El País (Uruguay) that he is "recognized as the father of a new discipline: ‘social management’". The publication Buenos Aires Económico stated that "this leading Argentine economist of humble origins has become a prominent figure, to the point of being today considered one of the chief global experts in the fight against poverty". The Brazilian magazine Carta Capital stated that he is "one of the first to spread the concepts of ethical development, social capital and corporate social responsibility". The Panamanian daily La Prensa described him as "the global corporate social responsibility guru".

José Fogaça, mayor of the Brazilian city of Porto Alegre, said that with his book Más ética, más desarrollo, "through an unusual political rumination, Bernardo Kliksberg gives us a brave and honest work, in which the ancient struggle against social inequality finds in ethics its most legitimate, essential and fundamental element".

Bishop Jorge Casaretto, President of the Social Pastoral Commission of Argentina, has stated that Kliksberg's work "makes us see that when we talk about development we have to put the human person front and center and prioritize its ethical and spiritual dimensions…all the latinamerican people must be grateful to his contribution to a real growth of our countries".

Jorge del Castillo Gálvez, President of Peru's Council of Ministers, has said that the "intellectual and innovative value of Más ética, más desarollo makes it a required point of reference for the construction of a fair, prosperous and inclusionary Latin America".

The Director of the Pan American Health Organization, Mirta Roses Periago, has described him as "an indefatigable and passionate spokesman for development ethics". Edgar Morin, Emeritus Chair of the National Centre for Scientific Research of France, said "The idea of an economy with a human face, was developed by Bernardo Kliksberg".

Among other accolades, he has been awarded a Doctor Honoris Causa by dozens of universities in the world, among them la Universidad de Buenos Aires, la Universidad Rey Juan Carlos de Madrid, la Universidad Nacional de Nuevo León, México, la Universidad Tecnológica de Panamá, la Universidad Interamericana de México, la Universidad Inca Garcilaso de la Vega de Perú, la Universidad Nacional de Córdoba, la Universidad Nacional de la República Dominicana, la Universidad Simón Bolívar de Venezuela, la Universidad de Ciencias Empresariales y Sociales (UCES) de Argentina, Universidad Nacional de San Juan, Argentina.

He has also received numerous distinctions, such as the 2006 Educator Award from the Catholic Church of Argentina, the 2009 Order of Civil Merit from King Juan Carlos I of Spain for "his personal and professional career" and his "extraordinary service to society", in the process becoming the first ever Argentine to earn this distinction, and the top honor of Argentine Senate, the Domingo Faustino Sarmiento award for his lifetimes contributions (2012).

His scientific work as a whole was unanimously declared to be of interest by the Argentine Senate "for its valuable intellectual contribution to the creation of more equitable societies and strong democracies". He has received the following awards: the 2005 AMIA Award, the 2005 Entrepreneurial Foundation for Sustainable Development's Award, the 2008 University of Buenos Aires School of Economics' Professional Achievement Award, the 2008 Lifetime Achievement Award from Argentina's Secretariat of Worship, the Mexican magazine Ganar-Ganar's 2009 Award for his eminent career in Corporate Social Responsibility education in Latin America, and the University of Buenos Aires "Great professor" award 2011.

In June 2007, he became the first foreigner to receive an honorary doctorate degree from la Universidad Rey Juan Carlos de Madrid.

On June 12, 2012, he was the first Spanish language social scientist who was awarded the Philosophae Honoris Causa of Jerusalem Hebrew University. Among the awarded in other years, Umberto Eco, Jacques Derrida, Vaclav Hevel and several Nobel Laureates.

Among other distinctions, he has received the Community Service Award from Ezras Israel Congregation in the United States, the Peruvian Award for Excellence in Cooperative Action and the Bicentenary of Argentina's Medal of Honor.

On April 8, 2010, the Legislature of the Autonomous City of Buenos Aires declared him an Illustrious Citizen of Buenos Aires., it stressed that "for 30 years, he has gained international recognition for his work on poverty, especially in Latin America. He has established himself as a pioneer of development ethics, social capital and corporate social responsibility, and the father of a new discipline, social management, which has spread throughout the entire continent, being vigorously applied in the fight against poverty".

On August 6, 2013, Caritas, AMIA and leaders organizations of several areas of Argentine civil society awarded him in a public ceremony the Solidarity Prize.

On March 6, 2013, the Catholic University of Salta, which has 92 branches in Argentina, awarded him the Honoris Causa Doctorate, and established the Bernardo Kliksberg Chair.

In September 2013, the National University from Jose C. Paz, Argentina, awarded him the Honoris Causa Doctorate and established the Bernardo Kliksberg Chair.

He designed for Argentina Ministry of Education a special program for the teaching of ethical values on the high schools. It started its implementation in Chaco province in 2013, which established the Bernardo Kliksberg Chair on "Ethics and Social Economy" in the last years of all the high schools.

The renowned author Ernesto Sábato, a Cervantes Prize for Literature winner, wrote on the cover of his book Escándalos Eticos (2011): "I became excited upon reading Kliksberg’s books. His books are a call to turn dry statistics into a rallying cry to take on world hunger".

In 2011, the School of Economics of Buenos Aires University, established the chair Bernardo Kliksberg, on Social Inclusion.

TV channel "Encuentro" produced a series of 25 chapters on his thinking in 2012 called "The Kliksberg Report" and, in 2013, a second Show. The "Kliksberg Report" was distinguished by the Argentinian Senate, and by the Argentinian Representatives Chamber. It was replicated by the National TV of Uruguay and is in being replicated by TV channels in Mexico, Peru, Costa Rica, Bolivia and Paraguay.

=== Publications ===
- Ethics for CEOS. Why business and countries win with Corporate Social Responsibility. Ethics and Economics edition, 2013. ISBN 978-987-29505-0-7.
- How to cope with poverty and inequality?. An international perspective. Ministry of Education of Argentine, UNESCO, 2013. ISBN 978-950-00-0973-7.
- Emprendedores Sociales. Los que hacen la diferencia, Bernardo Kliksberg. Editorial Temas, 2011. ISBN 978-9-87182-605-6
- Escándalos éticos, Bernardo Kliksberg. Temas Grupo Editorial (2011, sixth edition). ISBN 978-950-9445-89-5.
- América Latina frente a la crisis, Bernardo Kliksberg (comp). With contributions from Nobel Prize winner Muhamad Yunus and others. Sudamericana. Random House Mondadori. 2011. ISBN 978-950-07-3454-7
- Inseguridad Ciudadana. Cómo mejorarla?, Bernardo Kliksberg (comp.) Editorial Pearson. 2011. ISBN 978 987 615101-6
- Es Difícil ser jóven en América Latina, Bernardo Kliksberg (comp.). With contributions from Nobel Prize winner Joseph Stiglitz and others. Sudamericana. Random House Mondadori. 2011. ISBN 978-950-07-3184-3
- Pensamiento Social Estratégico. Una nueva mirada a los desafíos sociales de América Latina, Bernardo Kliksberg (comp), includes the work of Amartya Sen. Editorial Siglo XXI. ISBN 978-987-629-066-1
- Primero La Gente, Obra conjunta con el Premio Nobel de Economía, Amartya Sen (Editorial Planeta/Deusto, Madrid, 2008). ISBN 978-84-234-2583-9
- Más ética, más desarrollo, Editorial Temas, Buenos Aires, 19 editions. Special editions in Argentina, Peru, Paraguay, Venezuela, Brazil y Spain (published by el Instituto Nacional de Administración Pública de España). Published in 2008 by la Conferencia Mundial de Ciudades y la Ciudad de Porto Alegre, and in 2009 by the Mexican magazine "Ganar-Ganar". ISBN 987-9164-97-0
- El capital social movilizado contra la pobreza. La experiencia del Proyecto de Comunidades Especiales en Puerto Rico. Joint work with Marcia Rivera. UNESCO-FLACSO. December 2007. ISBN 978-987-1183-80-7
- Por un mundo mejor. El rol de la sociedad civil en las metas del milenio (comp.). AMIA, PNUD, AECID de España. Buenos Aires, 2007. ISBN 978-950-02-5348-2
- La agenda ética pendiente de América Latina (comp.) with contributions from Amartya Sen, José Antonio Ocampo, Daniel Filmus, Alicia Kirchner, Tarso Genro and others (Fondo de Cultura Económica, 2005). ISBN 950-557-650-1
- Valores éticos y vida cotidiana. Editorial Mila (2005). ISBN 978-987-9491-59-1
- Social justice. WJC. New York, 2003. ISBN 965-229-164-1
- Hacia una Economía con rostro Humano, (published in 2002, 12 editions, in various countries, translated and published in Portuguese by UNESCO), prologue by Edgar Morin. ISBN 978-950-557-594-7
- Ética y Desarrollo, La Relación Marginada (with Nobel Prize in Economics winners Amartya Sen, Joseph Stiglitz and others). (El Ateneo 2002). ISBN 950-02-6366-1
- Mitos y Falacias sobre sobre o desenvolvimento Social (UNESCO, Brazil, 2002). ISBN 85-249-0823-8
- El capital social. Dimensión olvidada del Desarrollo. Universidad Metropolitana. Venezuela, 2002. ISBN 980-366-259-7
- Capital Social y Cultura. Claves estratégicas del desarrollo. (Comp). Fondo de Cultura Económica, 2000. ISBN 950-557-368-5
- La Lucha contra la Pobreza en América Latina. (Comp). Fondo de Cultura Económica, 2000. ISBN 950-557-348-0, ISBN 978-950-557-348-6
- Pobreza. Un tema impostergable (five editions). Fondo de Cultura Económica, 1993. ISBN 980-6125-22-3
