= TECHO =

Chile-based nonprofit organization

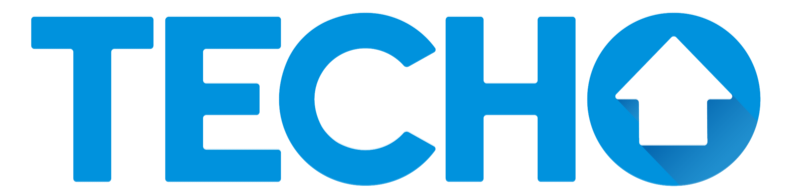
- Founded: 1997; 29 years ago in Chile
- Founder: Felipe Berríos; Francisco Irarrázaval Mena
- Type: Non-governmental organization Nonprofit organization Charitable organization
- Legal status: 501(c)(3) organization in the U.S.
- Location: Departamental 440, San Joaquín, Santiago, Chile
- Region served: Latin America and the Caribbean
- Products: Mediagua
- Method: construction of transitional houses; social inclusion programs
- Key people: Juan José Ayerza (CEO)
- Volunteers: 1,000,000+
- Website: techo.org (in Spanish and English)
- Formerly called: Un Techo para mi País (2001–2012)

TECHO, also known as Un Techo para mi País (UTPMP) (Spanish for: "A Roof For My Country"), is a nonprofit organization that mobilizes youth volunteers to fight extreme poverty in Latin America, by constructing transitional housing and implementing social inclusion programs. It was founded by a Jesuit priest, and working with more than 720,000 volunteers, it has constructed houses for over 102,400 families in 19 countries in Latin American and the Caribbean and 2 offices located in Miami, Florida, US, and London, England, that work as funds hubs.

Un Techo para Chile was formerly a separate organization. As of 2012, Un Techo para mi Pais and Un Techo para Chile became one single institution called TECHO.

== History ==
Un Techo para Chile was founded in 1997 by Jesuit priest Felipe Berríos, along with a group of university students. In 2001 it began expanding to other countries under the name Un Techo para mi País. In 2012 the name was changed to TECHO.

The organization has a long history of responding to disaster situations, such as earthquakes in Peru (2007), Haiti (2010) and Chile (2010). TECHO was one of the first organizations to start building houses after the 2010 Haiti earthquake, and it was awarded a grant from the Inter-American Development Bank to build 10,000 houses there. Building began in Canaan, Haiti in 2010.

Notably, TECHO coined the term Precaria (Precarious) as a notional country used as a framework for visualizing Latin American poverty. This has been adopted by numerous leading figures including the former President of Chile Michelle Bachelet, writer Isabel Allende, and Argentine corporate social responsibility expert Bernardo Kliksberg.

== Method ==
TECHO is most known for its large-scale construction projects, building transitional homes called mediaguas for people living in slums (campamentos) in Latin America. The homes are made of wood and built by volunteers who work alongside the beneficiary families. Transitional homes allow Latin America's poorest populations to have a private, safe and decent shelter; these basic results have long-term impacts which are being evaluated in the impact study “Building a Brighter Future: A Randomized Experiment of Slum-Housing Upgrading,” led by academics from the World Bank and the University of California, Berkeley.

In its second phase, TECHO coordinates social inclusion programs such as education, healthcare, economic development, micro-finance, and vocational training. These programs are organized around weekly community meetings led by residents of the area. The third phase involves helping residents develop their own sustainable communities, including construction of permanent housing.

Funding comes from grants, corporate support and individual donations.

== Countries ==
TECHO was founded in Chile and has its headquarters there. As of 2012, it works in 19 countries in Latin America: Argentina, Bolivia, Brazil, Chile, Colombia, Costa Rica, Dominican Republic, Ecuador, El Salvador, Guatemala, Haiti, Honduras, Mexico, Nicaragua, Panama, Paraguay, Peru, Uruguay, and Venezuela.

== Awards and grants ==
TECHO has received many awards and grants, including:

2018: Inter-American Development Bank's Premio JK Visionarios. Fourth Place. Recognition of civil society organizations implementing life-changing and innovative development programs in Latin America and the Caribbean.

2013: Dubai International Award for Best Practices (presented by Dubai Municipality and UN Habitat.

2012: Honorable Mention in the Inter-American Development Bank's Juscelino Kubitschek Award, for social programs in Chile.

2010: Housing and Urban Development South-South Transfer Award, presented jointly by UN Habitat, the Building and Social Housing and Foundation (BSHF) and the UNDP Special Unit for South-South Cooperation.

2010: $2.6 million grant from the Inter-American Development Bank Multilateral Investment Fund to build houses in Haiti.

2010: Clinton Global Initiative recognition for its commitment to build 10,000 houses in Haiti.

2010: King of Spain's Award for Human Rights.

2010: Vidanta Foundation Prize, second place (presented in conjunction with the Organization of American States (OAS) and the Ibero-American General Secretariat (SEGIB)).

2009: UN Habitat Scroll of Honour Award.

2008: one of "100 Best Practices," UN Habitat Dubai International Award for Best Practices, for TECHO Uruguay.

2007: Bicentennial Seal from Chilean President Michelle Bachelet for TECHO's contributions to building a more equal society.

2005: $3.5 million grant from the Inter-American Development Bank Multilateral Investment Fund to expand its methodology and experiences to other countries in Latin America.

2005: Social Entrepreneur Award, Schwab Foundation.
