= 2017 Torneo di Viareggio =

2017 Viareggio Cup World Football Tournament Coppa Carnevale
69° Torneo di Viareggio

Tournament details
- Host country: Italy
- City: Viareggio
- Dates: 13 March 2017 – 29 March 2017
- Teams: 40

This is the 69th edition of Torneo di Viareggio, the annual youth football tournament held in Viareggio, Tuscany.

== Format ==
The 40 teams are seeded in 10 groups, 5 groups in pool A and 5 groups in pool B. Each team from a group meets the others in a single tie. The winning club from each group and six best runners-up progress to the knockout stage. All matches in the final rounds are single tie. During the round of 16 no extra time will be played in case of a draw, with the match proceeding immediately to penalty kicks. From the quarterfinals on, matches include 30 minutes extra time and penalties to be played if the draw between teams still holds.

== Participating teams ==
40 teams participate in the tournament. The list of the teams are below.

Italian teams

- (Italy) Ancona
- (Italy) Ascoli
- (Italy) Atalanta
- (Italy) Bari
- (Italy) Bologna
- (Italy) Cagliari
- (Italy) Empoli
- (Italy) Fiorentina
- (Italy) Genoa
- (Italy) Inter Milan
- (Italy) Juventus
- (Italy) Maceratese
- (Italy) Milan
- (Italy) Napoli
- (Italy) Parma
- (Italy) Perugia
- (Italy) Pisa
- (Italy) Reggiana
- (Italy) Serie D Representatives
- (Italy) Sassuolo
- (Italy) SPAL
- (Italy) Spezia
- (Italy) Torino

European teams

- (Belgium) Club Brugge
- (Czech Republic) Dukla Prague
- (Greece) PAS Giannina
- (Netherlands) PSV
- (Croatia) Rijeka
- (Russia) Zenit Saint Petersburg

American teams

- (United States) Athletic Union
- (Argentina) Belgrano
- (Argentina) CAI
- (Colombia) Cortuluá
- (Argentina) Deportivo Camioneros
- (United States) LIAC New York
- (Brazil) Osasco
- (Canada) Toronto

African teams

- (Nigeria) Abuja
- (Nigeria) Garden City Panthers
- (Democratic Republic of the Congo) Ujana

== Group stage ==
=== Pool A ===
==== Group 1 ====
Team	Pld	W	D	L	GF	GA	GD	Pts
(Italy) Juventus	3	2	1	0	7	3	+4	7
(Italy) Maceratese	3	1	1	1	6	7	−1	4
(Czech Republic) Dukla Prague	3	1	0	2	5	6	−1	3
(Canada) Toronto	3	0	2	1	6	8	−2	2

==== Group 2 ====
Team	Pld	W	D	L	GF	GA	GD	Pts
(Italy) Atalanta	3	3	0	0	13	2	+11	9
(Brazil) Osasco	3	2	0	1	7	3	+4	6
(Nigeria) Abuja	3	1	0	2	5	5	0	3
(Italy) Ancona	3	0	0	3	2	17	−15	0

==== Group 3 ====
Team	Pld	W	D	L	GF	GA	GD	Pts
(Italy) Empoli	3	2	1	0	10	1	+15	7
(Italy) Ascoli	3	1	2	0	3	1	+2	5
(Russia) Zenit Saint Petersburg	3	1	1	1	8	3	+5	4
(United States) Athletic Union	3	0	0	3	0	16	−16	0

==== Group 4 ====
Team	Pld	W	D	L	GF	GA	GD	Pts
(Italy) Inter Milan	3	2	1	0	16	2	+14	7
(Italy) SPAL	3	2	1	0	10	1	+9	7
(Greece) PAS Giannina	3	1	0	2	4	5	−1	3
(United States) LIAC New York	3	0	0	3	1	23	−22	0

==== Group 5 ====
Team	Pld	W	D	L	GF	GA	GD	Pts
(Italy) Bologna	3	2	1	0	5	0	+5	7
(Italy) Sassuolo	3	2	1	0	4	0	+4	7
(Netherlands) PSV	3	1	0	2	1	6	−5	3
(Italy) Pisa	3	0	0	3	0	4	−4	0

=== Pool B ===
==== Group 6 ====
Team	Pld	W	D	L	GF	GA	GD	Pts
(Italy) Napoli	3	1	2	0	4	3	+1	5
(Italy) Bari	3	1	1	1	4	4	0	4
(Argentina) Deportivo Camioneros	3	1	1	1	4	3	+1	4
(Italy) Serie D Representatives	3	0	2	1	2	4	−2	2

==== Group 7 ====
Team	Pld	W	D	L	GF	GA	GD	Pts
(Argentina) Belgrano	3	3	0	0	5	2	+3	9
(Italy) Milan	3	2	0	1	8	5	+3	6
(Italy) Spezia	3	1	0	2	2	4	−2	3
(Democratic Republic of the Congo) Ujana	3	0	0	3	1	5	−4	0

==== Group 8 ====
Team	Pld	W	D	L	GF	GA	GD	Pts
(Italy) Fiorentina	3	3	0	0	7	3	+4	9
(Italy) Perugia	3	2	0	1	5	4	+1	6
(Argentina) CAI	3	0	1	2	4	6	−2	1
(Nigeria) Garden City Panthers	3	0	1	2	2	5	−3	1

==== Group 9 ====
Team	Pld	W	D	L	GF	GA	GD	Pts
(Belgium) Club Brugge	3	2	1	0	8	3	+5	7
(Italy) Cagliari	3	2	0	1	8	5	+3	6
(Italy) Genoa	3	1	1	1	7	5	+2	4
(Italy) Parma	3	0	0	3	1	11	−10	0

==== Group 10 ====
Team	Pld	W	D	L	GF	GA	GD	Pts
(Italy) Torino	3	3	0	0	6	0	+6	9
(Croatia) Rijeka	3	2	1	0	2	2	0	4
(Colombia) Cortuluá	3	2	1	0	4	5	−1	4
(Italy) Reggiana	3	0	0	3	1	6	−5	0

== Knockout stage ==
Round of 16
22 March
(Italy) Atalanta	4
(Italy) Perugia	0
22 March
(Italy) Torino	1 (2)
(Brazil) Osasco	1 (1)
22 March
(Italy) Inter Milan	4
(Italy) Cagliari	0
22 March
(Italy) Fiorentina	1 (6)
(Italy) Sassuolo	1 (7)
22 March
(Italy) Empoli	1
(Italy) Milan	0
22 March
(Argentina) Belgrano	1
(Italy) SPAL	2
22 March
(Italy) Bologna	1
(Italy) Napoli	2
22 March
(Belgium) Club Brugge	2 (7)
(Italy) Juventus	2 (6)

Quarter-finals
24 March
(Italy) Atalanta	1
(Italy) Torino	2
24 March
(Italy) Inter Milan	1 (8)
(Italy) Sassuolo	1 (9)
24 March
(Italy) Empoli	1
(Italy) SPAL	0
24 March
(Italy) Napoli	0
(Belgium) Club Brugge	2

Semi-finals
27 March
(Italy) Torino	0 (4)
(Italy) Sassuolo	0 (5)
27 March
(Italy) Empoli	3
(Belgium) Club Brugge	0

Final
29 March
(Italy) Sassuolo	2 (6)
(Italy) Empoli	2 (4)
