= Gianmarco Cavagnino =

Italian architect (born 1964)

- Born: 25 October 1964 (age 62); Asti, Italy

Gianmarco Cavagnino (born 25 October 1964) is an Italian architect.

== Biography ==
Gianmarco Cavagnino graduated in February 1989 from the Polytechnic University of Turin.

In 1991, while studying for a master's degree in communication and design at the Domus Academy (Milan), he had the opportunity to meet such personalities of international design as Andrea Branzi, Anna Castelli, Massimo Morozzi, Denis Santachiara and Aldo Cibic. He established with Aldo Cibic a cooperative relationship which is nowadays consolidated. Their first important joint project was "Canelli and the golden Lands" for tourist and cultural improvements to a 160 square kilometer area in Piedmont.

In 1995–1996, he received an honorable mention from Colorado State University in the International Small Home Competition; in 1997, he won the Architecture competition at the Academy of Architecture, Arts and Sciences in Los Angeles.

In 2004, he designed Valente Jewellers' main shop Galleria Vittorio Emanuele in Milan, with the intervention of Aron Demetz, thus launching into an international activity that has led him to found the design and communication company gianmarcocavagnino. In 2006 he received an honorable mention in the Skyscraper Competition eVolo.

In December 2006, he won the international interior design competition for the realization of a luxury hotel in a completely restructured 18th century building in the center of Saint Petersburg (Russia). In 2012 the Domina Prestige Hotel wins the FIABCI prize as Best Hotel in Russia; in 2018 Domina Prestige hotel in Saint Petersburg wins LGT (luxury travel guide) prize as “the best stylish luxury hotel in Russia”. He designed renovate the hotel Ca’Zusto in Venice, the hotel Piccolo in Portofino, and the hotel Zagarella in Santa Flavia (Palermo);

In 2009 he designs rounded version of the classic Emeco 1006 chair and in 2012 he designs the lamp M1 for the brand Viabizzuno; In 2010 he was invited to imagine the Christmas decorations of Rue Vieille du Temple in Paris; In 2011 he created and promoted the land marketing project "World Atlas of Vines".

In 2014 he worked as an architect and artistic supervisor in the expansion of Krasnodar international Airport for Sochi 2014 Winter Olympics; then he created the concept design for the Kuban Towers in Krasnodar and for the residential building Heliantus. He worked in cooperation with the SUSU University of Chelyabinsk. In 2014 he created the concept design for the Newsky 1 and Pella Home design hotel in Saint Petersburg; In 2016 he worked at Saltiniu Namai, complex of buildings and apartments in the residential district of Vilnius, in Lithuania.

In 2015 he was one of the 40 architects invited to redesign the Cassina LC50 showroom in Milan, in occasion of the 50th anniversary of Le Corbusier.

From 2015 to 2018 he founded the cultural association "Classico" and directed the organization of the homonymous festival "Classico" dedicated to the Italian language and literature, for three editions in Canelli.

He designed the boutique hotel in Carlo Scarpa's vacation home in Quero (BL), in 2019.

Gianmarco Cavagnino is the founder of storymoving®, a narrative approach to design, which manifesto explains the importance of witnessing authentic stories and sharing them through projects. Gianmarco Cavagnino follows this philosophy in every work and aims to share it and create a new generation of professional storymovers who are moved and operate with this method. For this reason he is the author of the workshop “designing happiness 2020” in partnership with DDN (Design Diffusion News magazine) and Festival della Crescita, intended for professionals in the design and architecture field.

In 2021 he took part and wins the urban contest "I Viali di Canelli" in Canelli, Piedmont, an ideas competition focus on the territory, the communication and the relationship with nature.

In 2021 he realized and achieved the artistic direction of the project Piemonte Home Design, to express the piemontese design and craftsmanship on international markets, in collaboration with the Turin and Italy-Russia's Chamber of Commerce.

== Works ==
Among his most recent works:

- The restructuring of apartments in Paris and Riga (Latvia) (monographic article on the review AD Balthia)
- Requalification of a 19th-century industrial area of 50,000 square meters in the center of Riga into a residential area (with mention on latvijasarchitectura)
- Domina Vacanze's management offices in Milan
- Restructuring of Ca' Zusto in Venice, a 14th-century Byzantine building transformed into a luxury hotel
- Design for an armchair for Fratelli Boffi
- Realizations of Valente Jewellers' shops in Budapest
- Valente's stand in Basel (2007)
- The new Valente's store in Lugano (Switzerland)
- The restructuring of the Giudecca hotel in Venice
- The restructuring of the Piccolo Hotel in the prestigious Portofino
- Artistic supervision in the coordination of the Domina Hotels Group's image in Italy
- Interior design for the World Trade Center in Riga
- Project and artistic supervision in the expansion of Krasnodar international Airport for Sochi 2014 Winter Olympics
- Concept design for the Kuban Towers in Krasnodar
- Concept design for the residential building Heliantus in Krasnodar
- Concept design for Newsky 1 and Pella Home design hotel in Saint Petersburg
- Cassina LC50 Anniversary showroom Milan, Via Durini
- Showroom StellaLuna & jkjy in Milan;
- Saltinui Namai residential district in Vilnius
- Renovation of Hotel Tyrol in Selva di Val Gardena
- Fratelli Gavazza spa: project and corporate identity
- AROL spa: project and corporate identity
- New production site and offices for Tirelli SRL at Mantua
- Boutique hotel in Carlo Scarpa's holiday home in Quero
- Maca industrial settlement in San Quirino
- New factory for Arione spa in Canelli
- Brand image and project for real estate agency Villaret in Paris
