= Catalina Palacios =

Chilean actress, singer and television presenter

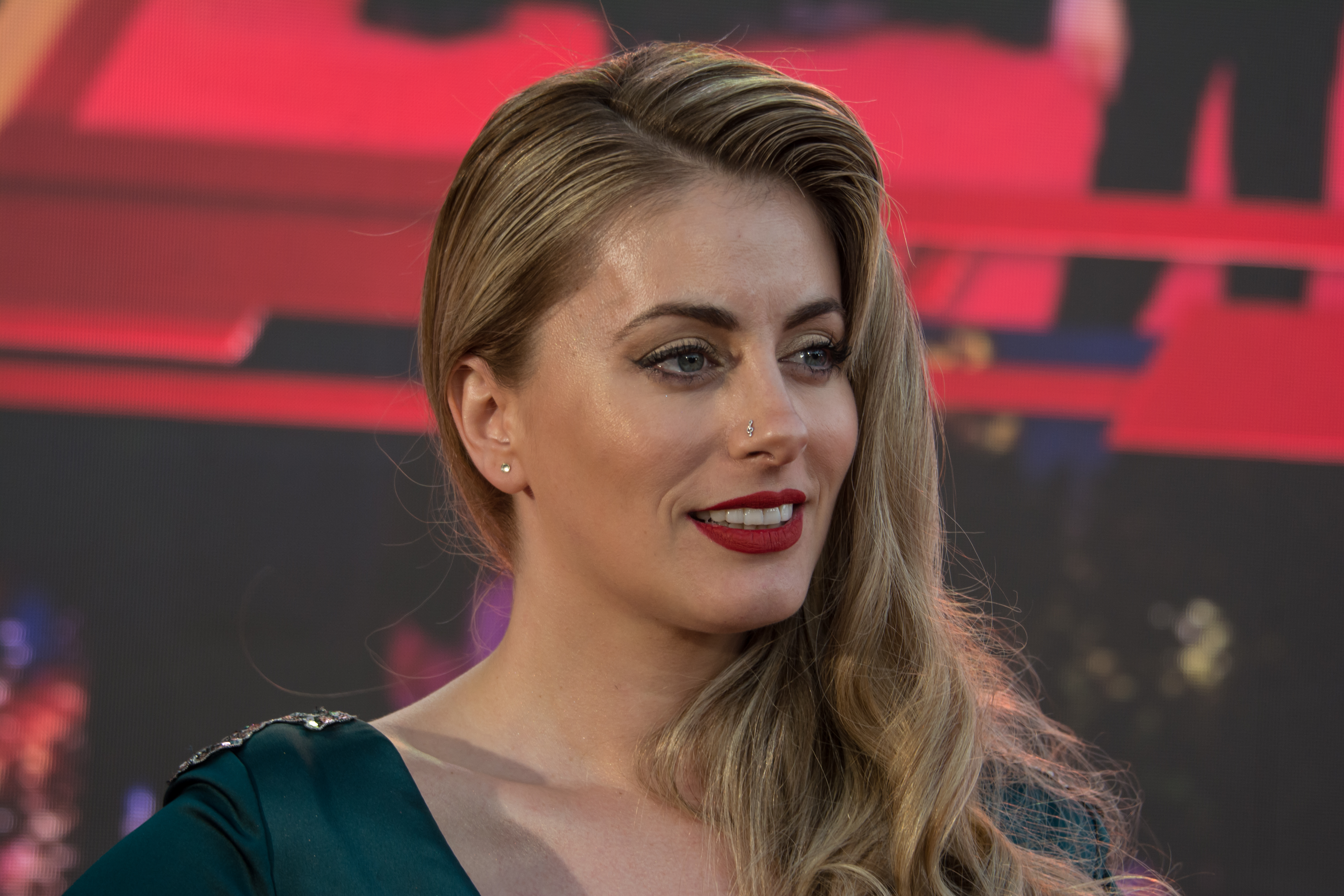
Catalina Palacios (2018)

Catalina Isabel Palacios Galindo, nickname Cata Palacios (born February 16, 1980, in Santiago) is a Chilean actress, singer and television presenter. She is known mostly for being in the cast of the youth program Mekano, for her role in the 2005 television series Magi-K, and for being the host of the youth program Yingo. She has participated in the 2008 Chilean telethon, Chile ayuda a Chile, and Dancing with the Stars.

== Television ==
=== Programs ===
- 2002-2003 - Mekano
- 2004-2006 - Zoolo TV
- 2004 - Cuento Contigo
- 2005 - Código F.A.M.A
- 2005-2006 - Entretemundo
- 2007 - El baile en TVN
- 2007-2011 - Yingo
- 2008 - Sin vergüenza
- 2008 - Teatro en Chilevisión
- 2009 - Festival del Huaso de Olmué
- 2011 - Fiebre de baile 4
- 2011 - Festival de Viña del Mar
- 2012 - Tu cara me suena
- 2013 - SaV
- 2014 - Festival Viva Dichato
- 2014 - Súper Bueno

=== Series ===
On Mega

- 2003: Amores urbanos as Isidora
- 2004-2005: BKN as Rocio Valtierra
- 2004: Profesionales as Lara
- 2005-2006: Magi-K as Isidora "Isi"
- 2007: Casado con hijos as invited artist

On Chilevisión

- 2010: Don diablo as Blanca "Blanquita"
- 2011: Vampiras as Tábata Romanov

== Theatre ==
- 2007: La Cenicienta as Cenicienta
- 2013: La bella y la bestia as Bella
- 2015: Regresarás, el musical as herself
- 2016: El collar de las Momias as Lila

== Discography ==
=== Albums ===
- 2006: Eclipse
- 2009: Kata
- 2018: Déjate llevar

=== Singles ===
- 2006: "Sobre la luna"
- 2009: "Regresarás"
- 2009: "Cierra la puerta"
- 2010: "Ya no quiero verte"
- 2012: "Paradise"
- 2013: "Baby"
- 2014: "Te voy amar (with Tim Jones)
- 2014: "Fiesta en la ciudad
- 2016: "Ayer"

== Musical Tours ==
- 2012: Catalina Palacios Tour 2012
