= Gianmarco Campironi =

Italian footballer (born 1989)

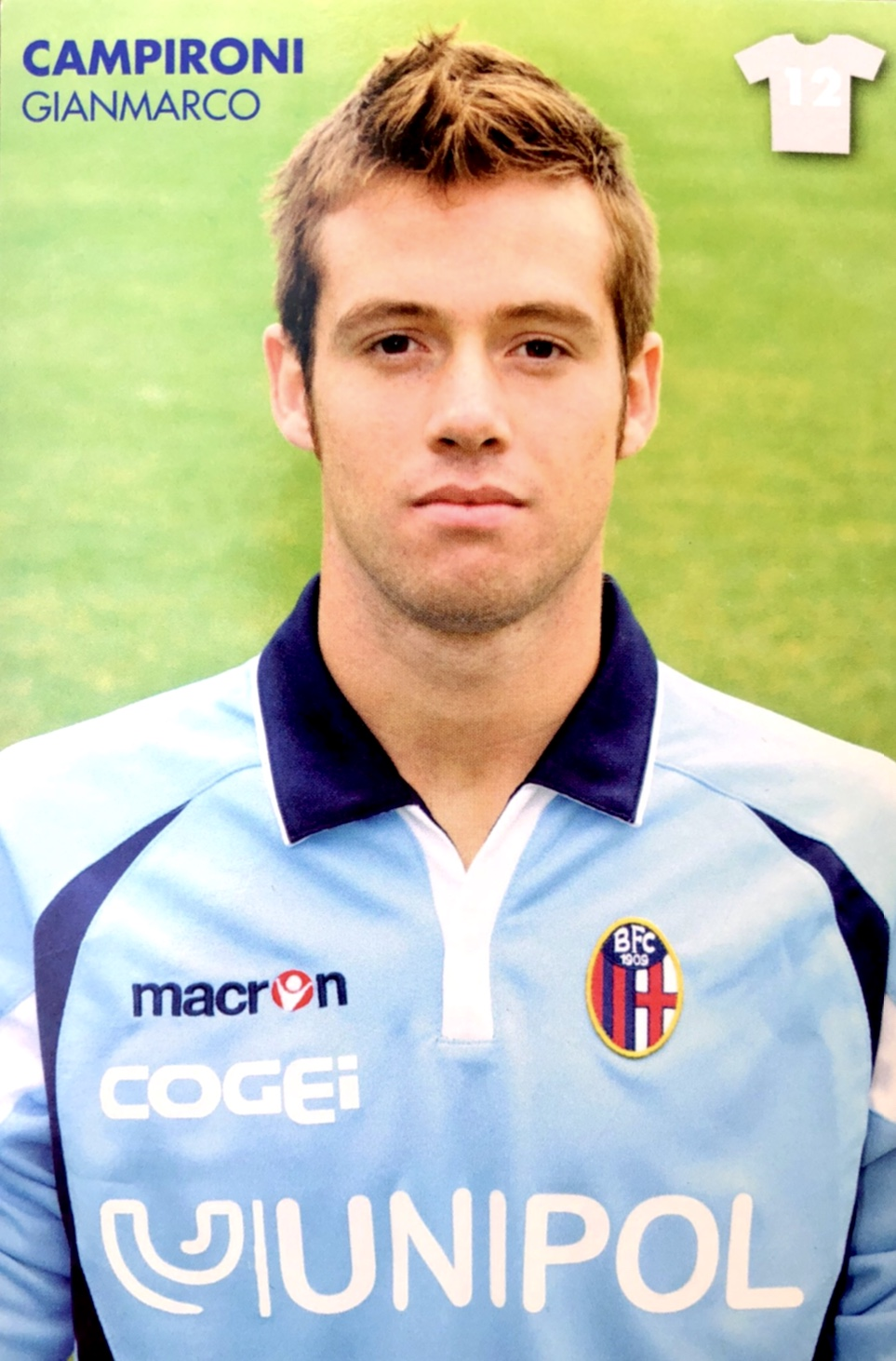

Personal information
- Date of birth: 16 May 1989 (age 37)
- Place of birth: Italy
- Height: 1.90 m (6 ft 3 in)
- Position: Goalkeeper

Youth career
- 1999/2007: AC Milan

Senior career*
| Years | Team | Apps | (Gls) |
| 2008 | AC Milan | 0 | |
| 2008-2009 | Bologna F.C. 1909 | 0 | |
| 2009-2010 | Gaeta Calcio 1931 | 36 | |
| 2010-2011 | A.C. Renate | 38 | |
| 2011-2012/13 | A.C.D. Treviso | 52 | |
| 2014 | S.C. Vallée d'Aoste | 1 | |
| 2014 | FC Chiasso | 0 | |
| 2014/2015 | KS Vllaznia Shkodër | 1 | |
| 2017/2018-19 | Vigevano Calcio | 60 | |
| 2019/2020 | Unione Sportiva Dilettantistica Casatese | 8 | |
| Total | | 196 | |

Managerial career
- 2020/2021: FC Juventus Academy Dubai
- * Club domestic league appearances and goals

Gianmarco Campironi (born 16 May 1989 in Italy) is an Italian former professional footballer who played as a goalkeeper. He is currently a goalkeeper coach at Juventus Academy Dubai.

== Biography ==
Gianmarco Campironi was born in Milan on May 16, 1989. Since he was a child he practiced various sports including tennis, karate and swimming. At the age of 10, however, he chose to definitively embark on a football career thanks to the call of his favorite team, A.C.Milan. His professional career was interrupted by the failure of Treviso and by different choices that led him to be known to the public not only for his football career but for the various television appearances. He was a columnist for the broadcast of sportitalia, he participated as a suitor to "Uomini e Donne", he was a guest at "takemeout", he joined various advertising campaigns such as for Vivident, Huawei, Etisalat, Ikea ... and finally was selected as a competitor to the Italian edition of exonthebeachitalia conducted by Elettra Lamborghini. He currently lives in Dubai where he began his career as a youth coach and goalkeeper coach of the Juventus Academy

== Career ==
Gianmarco Campironi's career was born very early, after being selected by A.C.Milan at the age of 10, he grew up in the youth sector for 8 years. He has had several very important coaches including Franco Baresi, Filippo Galli, Chicco Evani and goalkeeper coaches such as Pinato, Gigi Romano, Sebastiano Rossi, Abate and William Vecchi. The experience with Milan ends in the Primavera where he is bought by Bologna. Initially taken for the role of third goalkeeper in Serie A behind Antonioli and Colombo with Arrigoni on the bench. With the change of coach (Sinisa Mihjalovic) he took part in several benches in Serie a.

== Record ==
8 consecutive games without conceding a goal in the Second Division championship in Renate

== Honours ==
=== Club ===
==== F.C.Treviso ====
- Lega Pro Seconda Divisione 2011–12
- Silver Medal Supercoppa Italiana 2013
