= Japan Social Development Fund =

The Japan Social Development Fund (日本社会開発基金) or JSDF is an official development assistance program funded for World Bank by the government of Japan. The fund was originally set up in 2000 during the Asian financial crisis to reach those affected by supporting community development projects. The funds are contributed to the program through the Ministry of Finance of Japan. Since its creation the program has been an important source of funding for the provision of innovative development assistance in lower-income countries and a source of knowledge on community-based development.

The funds of the JSDF program are administered by the World Bank. An average of fifty proposals are submitted in each round to a selection committee, which is composed of Bank's senior development experts.

== History ==
The Japan Social Development Fund was established in June 2000 by the Government of Japan and the World Bank as a united mechanism for providing direct assistance to the poorest and most vulnerable groups in eligible World Bank Group member countries. Since inception, the government of Japan has provided $396 million to the JSDF program, and 278 grants with a total value of $295 million have been approved.

== Grants ==
=== Education ===
==== Colombia: Introducing Innovative Arts-Based Education to Displaced and Violence-Affected Communities ====
The Introducing Innovative Arts-Based Education to Displaced and Violence-Affected Communities grant is aimed at assisting the municipal government of Cartagena and El Colegio del Cuerpo (“School of the Body”), a local NGO which runs a modern dance and arts school to:

- rebuild the self-esteem and psychological well-being of underprivileged youths who have been victims of displacement and violence
- provide these youths with an alternative to violence, illegal activities or self-destructive behaviors by providing training and alternative career opportunities in the arts, and
- create a community of citizens devoted to peace-building and nonviolent conflict resolution.

==== Egypt: Preventing Child Labor ====
The Preventing Child Labor grant objective was to rehabilitate child laborers who continue to work legitimately, reintegrate them into schools, and support effective measures to prevent child labor.

== See also ==
- Official development assistance - ODA
- Japan International Cooperation Agency - JICA
