= Gianmarco Fabbri =

Italian football player

Personal information
- Date of birth: 25 June 1997 (age 29)
- Place of birth: Senigallia, Italy
- Height: 1.70 m (5 ft 7 in)
- Position: Left back

Team information
- Current team: Sangiustese

Youth career
- –2016: Cesena

Senior career*
Years	Team	Apps	(Gls)
2016–2018	Cesena	0	(0)
2016–2017	→ Delta Porto Tolle (loan)	33	(0)
2017–2018	→ Fano (loan)	5	(0)
2018–2019	Santarcangelo	22	(0)
2019	Cattolica SM	14	(1)
2019–	Sangiustese	5	(0)
- * Club domestic league appearances and goals as of 16:41, 17 January 2020 (UTC)

Gianmarco Fabbri (born 25 June 1997) is an Italian football player. He plays for Sangiustese.

== Club career ==
He made his Serie C debut for Fano on 27 August 2017 in a game against Bassano Virtus.
