= Ah Beng =

Term for anti-social youth in Singapore

- Tommy Wong playing the character of an Ah Beng
- Chinese: 阿明
Transcriptions
Standard Mandarin
- Hanyu Pinyin: Ā míng
Southern Min
- Hokkien POJ: A-bêng
- Tâi-lô: A-bîng

Ah Beng (Chinese: 阿明) is a pejorative term applied to describe anti-social lower-class youths in Singapore and Malaysia who display common characteristics such as dyed hair, wearing loud fashion, and playing music in public. The female equivalent of an Ah Beng is an Ah Lian (simplified Chinese: 阿莲; traditional Chinese: 阿蓮; Pe̍h-ōe-jī: a-liân).

A stereotypical Ah Beng would be someone who is not highly educated, is loud and unsophisticated, and operates within secret societies and street gangs. Ah Lians, on the other hand, are regarded as bimbos, and are stereotyped as anti-intellectual, superficial, materialistic, and shallow.

The equivalent of an Ah Beng in other English-speaking countries is often said to be Australia's bogans, the United States' rednecks and Britain's chavs.

== Etymology ==
Ah Beng comes from the romanisation of the Hokkien pronunciation of 阿明 (Pe̍h-ōe-jī: a-bêng). The character "明" (pinyin: míng; Pe̍h-ōe-jī: bêng) is commonly used in the names of ethnic Chinese males in the region; the term "Ah Beng" alludes to their commonness. (The term is therefore semantically somewhat equivalent to the American expression "Regular Joe", though the social connotations differ.)

Among Cantonese speakers, Ah Beng is also known as lala zai (啦啦仔). "Lala" has no actual meaning in itself, although it may have originated from the Singlish word "la"/"lah", while "zai" means "boy." "Lala zai" refers to individuals who speak in Malaysian English or "pure" Singlish and who possess a strong preference for gaudy fashions or hairstyles.

== In popular culture ==
Ah Bengs have been featured in several Singaporean films, including:

- Army Daze (1996) - Adrian Lim Meng Kiat portrays REC Teo Ah Beng who has a severe dislike of having to serve National Service and is only doing it for the allowance. A recurring joke about Ah Beng is that everyone keeps telling him to speak Mandarin when he keeps speaking Hokkien.
- Money No Enough (1998) - A comedy film about three Singaporean men whom are close and best friends who start a car polishing business together to resolve their financial problems.
- S11 (2006) — A film about three Singaporeans whose lives coincide.
- Ah Boys to Men (2012) and Ah Boys to Men 2 (2013) — Wang Weiliang portrays REC "Lobang" or "Lobang King" who is also another notable example of an Ah Beng who mainly speaks Mandarin and Hokkien throughout the films.

The stereotypical Ah Beng was the titular protagonist, CEO, white-collar worker and general contractor named Phua Chu Kang (portrayed by Gurmit Singh) in the popular Singaporean local sitcom known as Phua Chu Kang Pte Ltd. In the sitcom, Chu Kang's younger brother, Anthony Phua Chu Beng (portrayed by Edwin Chong in Season 1 and Pierre Png from Seasons 2 to 8), is nicknamed Ah Beng, despite being an articulate and educated architect, which is the complete antithesis of an Ah Beng.

== See also ==
- NEET

=== In other countries ===
- Alay (Indonesia)
- Ars (slang) (Israel)
- Bogan (Australia/NZ)
- Bōsōzoku (Japan)
- Cañí (Spain), a slur against Romani people
- Chav (United Kingdom)
- Cholo (Mexico)
- Dizelaši (Serbia)
- Dresiarz (Poland)
- Eshay (Australia)
- Flaite (Chile)
- Gabber / tokkie (Netherlands)
- Gopnik (Soviet Union/Russia)
- Hoser (Canada)
- Jejemon (Philippines)
- Kazan phenomenon
- Malandro (Brazil)
- Mat Rempit (Malaysia)
- Ned (Scottish)
- Racaille (France)
- Raggare (Sweden/Norway)
- Redneck (United States)
- Skanger (Ireland)
- Skeet (Newfoundland and Labrador, Canada)
- Tapori / Mawali (India)
- Trẻ trâu (Vietnam)
- Yankī (Japan)
- Yob (slang) (United Kingdom and others)
- Zef (South Africa)
