= Chav =

Stereotype of anti-social youth dressed in sportswear

"Chav" (/tʃæv/), also "charver", or "roadman" or "scally", or "townie", in parts of England, is a British term, usually used in a pejorative way. The term is used to describe an anti-social lower-class youth dressed in sportswear. The term has been described as classist. Julie Burchill described the term as a form of "social racism". "Chavette" is a related term referring to female chavs, and the adjectives "chavvy", "chavvish", and "chavtastic" are used to describe things associated with chavs, such as fashion, slang, etc. In Australia, "eshay" or "adlay" has been described as a "try-hard chav".

== Etymology ==
"Chav" is usually thought to derive from Romani, either from the Romani word "chavo" (a boy or unmarried man) or the Angloromani "chavvy" (child). It may have come into English through Polari, where "chavy" meant "child". "Chavi" is attested in English from the 19th century. It may also be related to the northeastern dialect word "charver" (or "charva"), denoting members of a subculture of unemployed or lower-class youths in Tyneside.

The word in its current pejorative usage is recorded by the Oxford English Dictionary as first used in a Usenet forum in 1998 and first used in a newspaper in 2002. By 2005, the term had become widely used to refer to a type of anti-social, uncultured youth, portrayed as wearing excessive flashy jewellery, white athletic shoes, baseball caps, and counterfeit designer clothes. Similarly, girls are portrayed as commonly wearing clothes which expose their midriffs. In the 2000s, many neologisms derived from "chav" were coined, including "Chavsville" (an epithet for Romford, and later Bridgend), "chavette" (a female chav) and "chavvy" (characteristic of a chav).

Several folk etymologies for the word have developed. Many are acronyms, for example of "council house and violent". It is also often connected with the towns of Chatham or Cheltenham, for instance as a contraction of "Cheltenham average".

== Stereotype ==
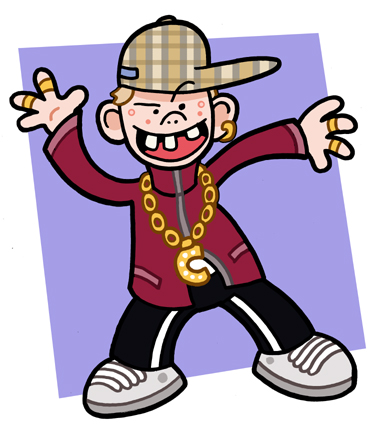
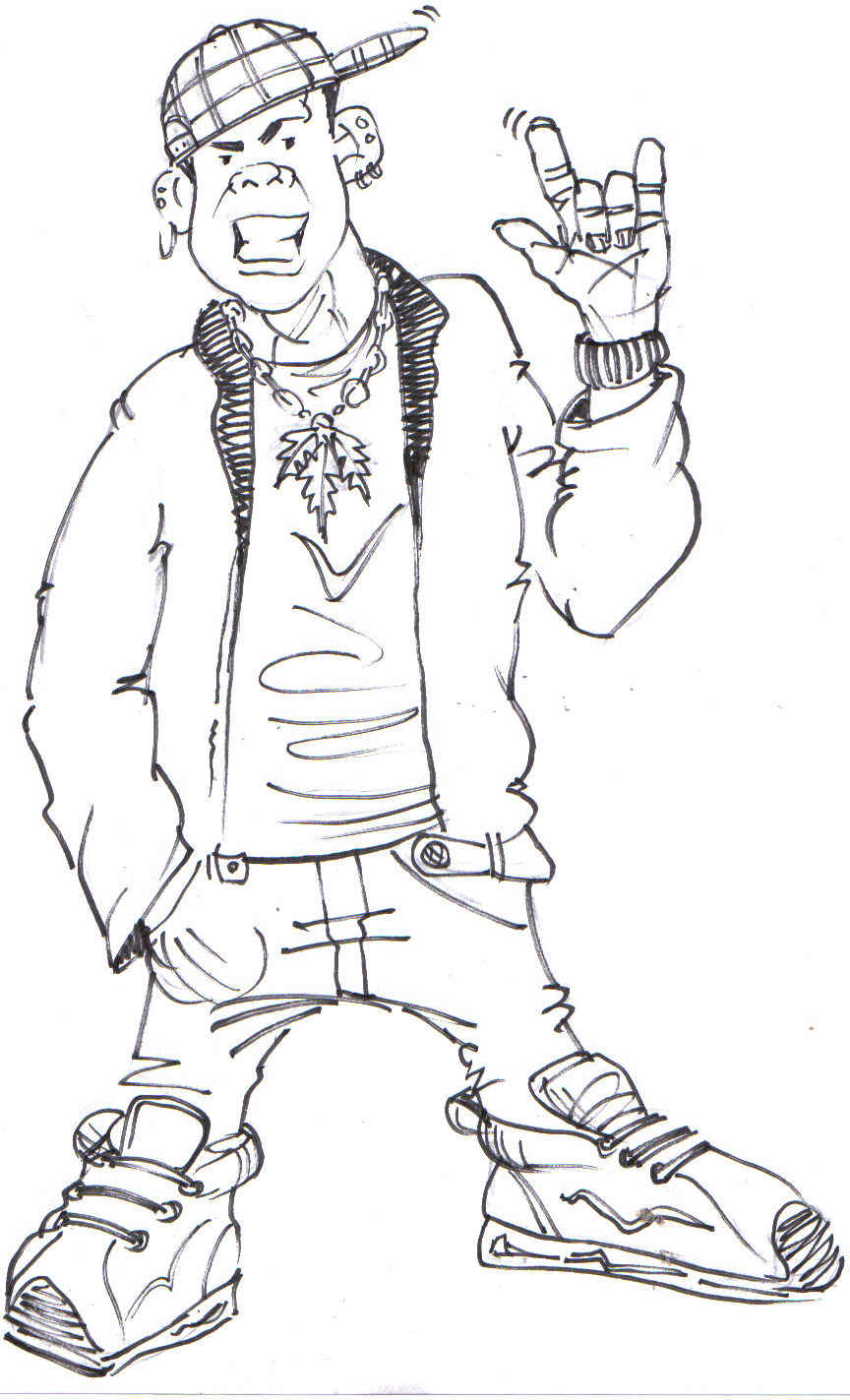
Caricatures of the chav stereotype

Besides referring to loutish (ill-mannered) behaviour, violence, and particular speech patterns (all of which are stereotypes), the chav stereotype includes wearing branded designer sportswear, which may be accompanied by some form of flashy gold jewellery otherwise termed as "bling". They have been described as adopting "black culture".

In a case where a teenage woman was barred from her own home under the terms of an anti-social behaviour order in 2005, some British national newspapers branded her "the real-life Vicky Pollard" with the Daily Star running headlines reading, "Good riddance to chav scum: real life Vicky Pollard evicted", both referring to a BBC comedy character. A 2006 survey by YouGov suggested 70% of TV industry professionals believed that Vicky Pollard was an accurate reflection of white working-class youth.

Response to the stereotype has ranged from amusement to criticism, with some saying that it is a new manifestation of classism. The Guardian in 2011 identified issues stemming from the use of the terms "hoodies" and "chav" within the mass media, which had led to age discrimination as a result of mass media-created stereotypes.

=== Commercial effect ===
In 2005, the fashion house Burberry, whilst deriding chavs, claimed that the widespread fashion in the UK of chavs wearing its branded style (Burberry check) was due to the widespread availability of cheaper counterfeit versions.

The supermarket chain Asda applied in 2006 to register "chav" as a trademark for a line of confectionery. A spokeswoman said, "With slogans from characters in shows such as Little Britain and The Catherine Tate Show providing us with more and more contemporary slang, our 'Whatever' sweets—now nicknamed chav hearts—have become very popular with kids and grown-ups alike. We thought we needed to give them some respect and have decided to trademark our sweets."

== Criticism of the stereotype ==
A BBC TV documentary suggested that chav culture is an evolution of previous working-class youth subcultures associated with particular commercial clothing styles, such as mods, skinheads, and casuals.

In a February 2005 article in The Times, Julie Burchill argued that use of the word is a form of "social racism", and that such "sneering" reveals more about the shortcomings of the "chav-haters" than those of their supposed victims. The writer John Harris argued along similar lines in a 2007 article in The Guardian. The widespread use of the "chav" stereotype has been criticised. Some argue that it amounts to simple snobbery and elitism. Critics of the term have argued that its users are "neo-snobs", and that its increasing popularity raises questions about how British society deals with social mobility and class.

The Fabian Society considers the term to be offensive and regards it as "sneering and patronising" to a largely voiceless group. On describing those who use the word, the society stated that "we all know their old serviette/napkin, lounge/living room, settee/sofa tricks. But this is something new. This is middle class hatred of the white working class, pure and simple." The Fabian Society have been highly critical of the BBC in using the term in broadcasts. Use of the term 'chav' was reported in The Guardian in 2011 as "class abuse by people asserting superiority". Writer Owen Jones also criticised the use of the term in his book Chavs: The Demonization of the Working Class.

== In the media ==
By 2004, the word was used in national newspapers and common parlance in the UK. Susie Dent's Larpers and Shroomers: The Language Report, published by the Oxford University Press, designated it as the "word of the year" in 2004.

Characters described as "chavs" have been featured in numerous British television programmes, as well as films. The character, clothing, attitude and musical interests of Lauren Cooper and her friends in the BBC comedy series, The Catherine Tate Show, have been associated with the chav stereotype. The character Ali G, created by Sacha Baron Cohen originally for The 11 O'Clock Show and eventually gaining more popularity due to the Da Ali G Show, is described as using "the chav's putative anti-intellectuality to critique radical political stances". The BBC comedy series Little Britain features the character Vicky Pollard (portrayed by Matt Lucas), a parody of a teenage female chav. In the British television series Misfits, the character of Kelly Bailey is presented as a stereotypical chav. Lauren Socha, the actress who portrays Kelly, has described the character as being "a bit chavvy". The Times has referred to the character as "[a] chavvish girl", and the character has been said to possess a "chav accent".

In the "New Earth" episode of the BBC TV series Doctor Who, the character Lady Cassandra is transplanted into Rose Tyler's body (Billie Piper). When Cassandra sees herself in a mirror, she exclaims "Oh my God... I'm a chav!" In Kingsman: The Secret Service, the main character Eggsy Unwin (Taron Egerton) is introduced as a stereotypical chav.

== See also ==
- Rednecks in the US, Bogans in Australia, Neds in Scotland, Hosers in Canada particularly Skeet in Newfoundland, Rezzers in Manitoba and Saskatchewan, some parts of Northern Ontario, Northern Alberta, Northwest Territories and Yukon, Surrey Jack in British Columbia, Skite in Prince Edward Island and Baveux in Quebec
- Ah Beng in Malaysia and Singapore, Alay in Indonesia, and Jejemon in the Philippines
- British subcultures like the football Yob, Lad culture, Hooliganism, Bootboy, and Football casuals, the 1980s precursor to the chav subculture
- Eshays in Australia
- Gopniks in the former Soviet Union, Dizelaši in Serbia and Dresiarz in Poland
- Harry in Norway
- Ratchet in the southern U.S.
- Talahons in Germany
- Tokkie in the Netherlands, and Zef in South Africa
- Westie, similar stereotype in Australia and New Zealand
- Yankī/Ganguro/Gyaru in Japan
