= Cheesehead =

Nickname for people from Wisconsin

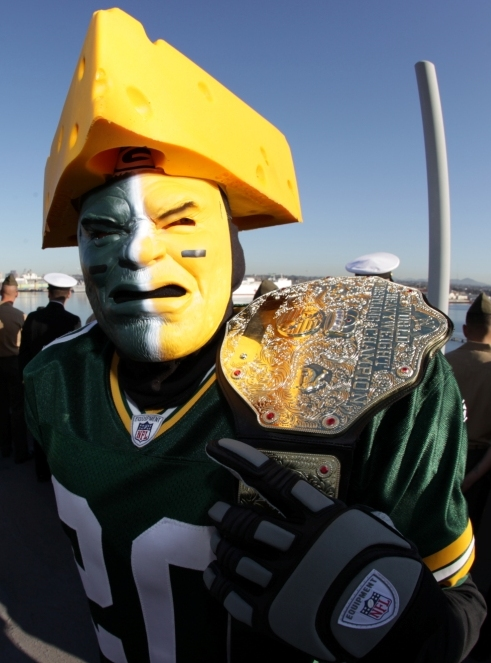
- A Green Bay Packers fan wearing a cheesehead hat
- Origin: Sports
- Context: Wisconsin dairy industry
- Meaning: Person from Wisconsin; Fan of the Green Bay Packers

Cheesehead is a nickname in the United States for a person from Wisconsin. The nickname is used for supporters of the Green Bay Packers, an American football team in the National Football League based in Green Bay, Wisconsin; it is also the name of cheese-shaped foam hats that supporters of the team wear. Wisconsin is well-known for its dairy industry and is called "America's Dairyland".

The use of the term "cheesehead" in America originated with Illinois sports fans, who used it to derogatorily describe Wisconsin sports fans. Cheesehead as a derogatory term has an older history in Europe, with German soldiers mocking Dutch people by calling them kaaskop, which translates to "cheese head". Kaaskop is now considered a profanity and is used to refer to someone as stupid or dense. Even with its derogatory history, the term was reappropriated and embraced by Wisconsinites, especially fans of the Packers.

In the 1990s, cheesehead hats made out of foam in the shape of a cheese wedge became popular in the Wisconsin sports scene, especially for Packers' supporters. The hats were created and sold by a company called Foamation, who owned a trademark for the term "cheesehead". The Packers purchased Foamation in 2023, making the cheesehead hat and related memorabilia official merchandise.

== Background ==
Wisconsin is associated with cheese because the state historically produced more dairy products than other American states, giving it the nickname "America's Dairyland". The use of the term "Cheesehead" as a derogatory word for Wisconsinites originated with Illinois football and baseball fans to refer to opposing Wisconsin sports fans. The term, however, was quickly embraced by Wisconsinites and is now a point of pride.

During World War II, German soldiers mockingly referred to the Dutch as cheeseheads because of the Netherlands' extensive dairy farming industry. The Dutch term kaaskop, literally "cheese head", is considered a profanity to refer to a person as stupid or dense.

In the 1969 novel Papillon, the term was used to describe the unsophisticated jurors who voted to convict the main character.

== Cheesehead hat ==
Rose Bruno first saw a cardboard "Cheesehead" hat at a Milwaukee Brewers versus Chicago White Sox game in Chicago in 1987, worn by fellow Milwaukeean Amerik Wojciechowski. Ralph Bruno later made the first one out of foam while he was cutting up his mother's couch. It was made popular by centerfielder Rick Manning, who saw the hat while playing. Bruno started a multi-million-dollar business to sell the hats as novelties. The "Cheesehead" trademark is owned by Foamation, Inc. of St. Francis, Wisconsin, which began manufacture of the wearable, foam "Cheesehead" in 1987. Along with the original Cheesehead "wedge", Foamation has made other similar "cheese" apparel, including baseball caps, cowboy hats, and earrings. In 2023, Bruno sold Foamation to the Green Bay Packers, making the Cheesehead official Packers merchandise.

The Cheesehead gained attention in 1995, when Packers fan Frank Emmert Jr. was flying on a private plane back to Wisconsin after attending a Packers game against the Cleveland Browns and the plane crashed due to ice accumulation. Emmert suffered a broken ankle and other minor injuries but was saved from further serious injury when he used his Cheesehead for protection in the crash.

Cheesehead hats have evolved beyond sports to become a cultural and political symbol of Wisconsin. Notably, Wisconsin delegates wore Cheesehead hats at both the 2024 Republican National Convention and the 2024 Democratic National Convention to represent their state.

In response to the Cheeseheads, fans of opposing teams have worn graters. A foam cheese grater hat from Foam Party Hats garnered national attention in 2025 when Chicago Bears receiver D. J. Moore wore one to celebrate defeating their rival, leading to an influx of orders and revitalized business for the company. Foam Party Hats previously made a cheesehead hat before receiving a cease and desist from the Packers, which encouraged owner Miguel Rojas to create the grater in response. In 2025, just before the Philadelphia Eagles visited Lambeau Field to play the Packers, the Philadelphia Cream Cheese brand began selling giant sticks of their cream cheese as hats for Eagles fans to wear, known as "Phillyheads".

== See also ==
- List of demonyms for U.S. states and territories
