= Dutch profanity =

Profane words used in the Dutch language

Dutch profanity can be divided into several categories. Often, the words used in profanity by speakers of Dutch are based around various names for diseases. In many cases, these words have evolved into slang, and many euphemisms for diseases are in common use.

Additionally, a substantial number of curse words in the Dutch language are references to sexual acts, genitalia, or bodily functions. Religious curse words also make up a considerable part of the Dutch profanity vocabulary. Aside from these categories, the Dutch language has many words that are only used for animals; these words are insulting when applied to people. English terms often complement the Dutch vocabulary, and several English curse words are commonly in use.

Because of the prominence of the diminutive in the Dutch language, most nouns used in Dutch profanity can also be said or written in their diminutive forms.

The words listed here are mostly used in the Netherlands; some of them are uncommon in Flanders.

== Profanity related to illness and diseases ==
achterlijk	Achterlijk ("retarded") had been used as a word to denote mentally disabled people in the past. It is commonly used as an insult, usually for people who do not have their facts up to date, or for people, organisations or geographic areas considered backwards or old-fashioned. A humorous variation, "achterlijke gladiool" ("retarded gladiolus"), was first lexicalized in 1984.
debiel	Debiel ("incapable" or "infirm") is a term for people with a developmental disorder. It is commonly used as an insult.
downie	Downie has the same meaning as the English "downy", referring to people with Down's Syndrome.
idioot	Idioot means "idiot". Also used in Afrikaans as equal to "idiot".
kanker	Kanker means "cancer". It can be used as a strong expletive, as an adjective or as an adverb. Krijg de kanker ("get cancer") is used as an insult. In slang, it can also have a positive meaning. For example, kankerlekker can mean "extremely good tasting" or "very attractive". Even when used this way in its positive meaning, the word can still be considered very offensive and its use is strongly discouraged. "Kanker" can be paired with nearly any insult to intensify it. The word is sometimes shortened to its historical euphemism K, or in slang kk or kkr.
kankerlijer	Kankerlijer means "cancer sufferer". It is a strong insult: an example of its legal status can be found in court cases, in which using the word kankerlijer to insult a police officer was cited as a serious offense.
klere	Klere is a slang word for cholera. It can be used as an expletive, as an adjective or as an adverb. Kolere is a common variation.
klerelijer	Klerelijer is a slang word meaning "cholera sufferer". It is used as an insult, and roughly analogous to "motherfucker".
kolere	Kolere is a slang word for cholera. It can be used as an expletive, as an adjective or as an adverb. Klere is a common variation.
krijg de...	To wish a disease upon someone, the words krijg de... ("catch the...", "get the...", "contract the...") are typically used. Examples include krijg de tering, krijg de tyfus, krijg de kanker, krijg de pest, krijg de takke, krijg de aambeien, krijg de klere, krijg het lazarus and the more euphemistic (but more old-fashioned) krijg de ziekte. In standard Dutch, the article is superfluous or incorrect in these phrases, and consequently "de" and "het" are only paired with disease names in context of profanity.
lazarus	Lazarus is a euphemism for leprosy. Krijg het lazarus ("catch the leprosy") is uncommonly used as an insult. It is more often used as slang for getting very drunk, comparable to "shitfaced".
lijer	Lijer (literally: "sufferer") is a noun and suffix. It is correctly spelled "lijder", but the "d" becomes silent in slang. It is used both as a standalone insult and in combination with diseases, such as kankerlijer, klerelijer, pleurislijer, pokke(n)lijer, takkelijer, teringlijer and tyfuslijer.
mongool	Mongool ("mongoloid") is a common insult, referring to Down syndrome. Its diminutive mongooltje is often used as a somewhat more neutral or affectionate term for people with Down syndrome, although it is not considered politically correct. Kankermongool ("cancer-mongoloid", idiomatically "fucking retard") is a common variation; see kanker. Some people use mogool. Also frequently used in Afrikaans.
minkukel	Minkukel is a neologism introduced by a famous Dutch comics writer, Marten Toonder. It is incorrectly used to denote somebody with a small (minor) brain or low IQ. According to the writer it is actually a positive quality, as a lack of pretence and ego.
pest	Pest (literally: "plague", compare "pestilence") can be used as an adjective or as an adverb. The verb pesten means "to bully" (whereas the etymologically related "plagen" means "to tease"). "De pest in hebben" ("to have the plague in") means "to be irritated". The word is sometimes shortened to its historical euphemism P.
pestkop	Literally meaning "plague head", a pestkop is someone who engages in bullying. See pest and kop.
pleur(it)is	Pleuris, or less commonly pleuritis, is a slang word for tuberculosis (compare tering), originally referring to any form of lung infection. It can be used as an expletive, as an adjective or as an adverb. Krijg de pleuris ("catch the tuberculosis") is also commonly used. As with tering, the phrase "alles ging naar de pleuris" ("everything went to the tuberculosis", analogous to "everything went to hell/shit") is commonly used. As a verb, the word oppleuren (literally "to tuberculosis off") can mean "to fuck off" (compare optiefen under tyfus).
pleurislijer	Pleurislijer is a slang word meaning "tuberculosis sufferer". It is used as an insult, and roughly analogous to "motherfucker".
polio	Polio is uncommon as a curse word, and is mostly heard in the phrase "heb je soms polio?" ("do you have polio or something?"), which can be used to insult someone's perceived laziness. The Genootschap Onze Taal (Dutch Language Society) has noted a rise in the use of polio as an expletive and adjective in the Rotterdam area, and describes it as a possible alternative to the more severe kanker.
pokke(n)	Pokke(n) (correctly spelled "pokken") is a slang word for smallpox. It can be used as an adjective or as an adverb.
pokke(n)lijer	Pokke(n)lijer is a slang word meaning "smallpox sufferer". It is used as an insult, and roughly analogous to "motherfucker".
stom	Stom (literally: "unintelligent", "dumb", "mute") can be used an intensifier when using curse words. Examples are "stomme hoer" ("dumb whore") and "stomme kut" ("dumb cunt"). Stommeling is the person who is considered stupid.
takke	Takke (from French "attaque") is a slang word for stroke. It can be used an adjective or as an adverb. Krijg de takke ("have the stroke") is used as an insult. A common variation is takkewijf ("stroke woman"): see also wijf.
tering	Tering is a slang word for tuberculosis. It is short for "vertering" (literally: "digestion"; compare English "consumption"). It can be used as an expletive, as an adjective or as an adverb. Vliegende tering ("flying tuberculosis") is a humorous variation, originally referring to sudden-onset tuberculosis. Krijg de tering ("catch the tuberculosis") is used as an insult. Other words for tuberculosis include TB and TBC, which were historically used as euphemisms, as the names of diseases were considered profane. As with pleuris, the phrase "alles ging naar de tering" ("everything went to the tuberculosis", analogous to "everything went to hell") is commonly used.
teringlijer	Teringlijer is a slang word meaning "tuberculosis sufferer". It is used as an insult, and roughly analogous to "motherfucker".
tyfus	Tyfus is a word for typhoid fever. It can be used as an expletive, as an adjective or as an adverb. Krijg de tyfus ("catch the typhoid fever") is used as an insult. The variation optiefen ("to typhoid off") is analogous to "fuck off" (compare oppleuren under pleuris). Sanders and Tempelaars (1998) note tiefttering ("typhoid tuberculosis") as a variation common in Rotterdam.
tyfuslijer	Tyfuslijer is a slang word meaning "typhoid fever sufferer". It is used as an insult, and roughly analogous to "motherfucker".
vinkentering	Vinkentering (literally: "finch tuberculosis") is noted by Sanders and Tempelaars (1998) as an expression that is typical in the Rotterdam vocabulary. A noted humorous variation is krijg de (vliegende) vinkentering ("catch the (flying) finch tuberculosis"). See also tering.
ziekte	Ziekte (literally: "sickness", "illness" or "disease") is used in the expression krijg de ziekte ("catch the disease"). It is a euphemism that can be used for various afflictions. Older variations include drinken als de ziekte ("to drink like the disease"). Ziek can also be used as an adjective, much in the same sense that "sick" in English is used.

== Profanity related to religion and death ==
gadverdamme	Gadverdamme is a softened version of godverdomme. Gadverdamme is used to express disgust. It is often shortened to gadver or gatver.
getverderrie	Getverderrie is a softened version of godverdomme, and is used to express disgust. It is often shortened to getver.
godverdomme	Godverdomme is a shortened version of the subjunctive phrase "God verdoeme..." ("may God damn...", compare English "goddamnit"). Verdomme ("damn", literally "damn me") or Godsamme ("God shall me", short for "God zal me verhoeden" = "God shall protect me" e.g. from doing something barbarous) are common variations. Softened versions exist like gadverdamme and getverderrie which are specifically meant to express disgust, snotverdomme, potverdorie, potvolblomme, potvoldriedubbeltjes, potverdrie.
godskolere	Godskolere is a combination of the West-Flemish dialect word koleire (meaning "being furious"; "colère" in French) and God.
graftak	Graftak literally means "grave branch" and refers to someone's age. This is typically enforced by adding ouwe/oude ("old") or achterlijke ("retarded"). The word can also refer to a moody, cranky person.
hel	Hel ("hell") is not typically used in Dutch profanity. The word can be seen in some expressions, including "loop naar de hel" (literally: "walk to hell", analogous to "go to hell"), "hels karwei" ("hellish chore"), and the archaic helleveeg ("evil woman from hell").
Jezus Christus	Jezus Christus ("Jesus Christ") is used similarly to godverdomme, although it is slightly less offensive. Often just Jezus, or in the form of minced oaths: tjezus, jeetje, jezus mina etc. Disgust can be expressed by jesses, jasses, harrejasses, the last from Here Jezus ("Lord Jesus").
Judas	Judas is used as an insult for somebody who is considered a traitor, like Judas Iskariot who according to the New Testament betrayed Jesus Christ for 30 silverlings. The derived verb judassen refers to harassing somebody.
kopvod	Kopvod ("head rag") is a derogatory word to refer to the hijab worn by some Muslim women. Popularised by Geert Wilders, it is mostly used in relation to the proposed kopvoddentaks ("head rag tax").
verdomme	Verdomme ("damn") is a common variation of godverdomme. Because it doesn't use "god" it is seen as slightly less offensive than "godverdomme", but as it originates from "godverdomme", some religious Dutch people still find it very offensive.
verdorie	Verdorie is a softer variation of verdomme ("darn"). There is a large number of bastard curses of this form, including potdorie, potjandorie, potdrie, potverdriedubbeltjes, potdeksels, deksels, etc.

== Profanity related to sexuality, the human body, and animals ==
anaalgeneraal	Anaalgeneraal means "anal general". It is used to insult men who have sex with men.
bastaard	Bastaard is the Dutch word for bastard. Uncommonly used in the same context as the English equivalent.
bek	Bek ("animal mouth") is most commonly used in the phrase "houd je bek" ("shut your mouth"). Compare kop and muil.
bitch	Bitch is an English loan word. Its Dutch equivalent is teef. The same word is also used in the Afrikaans language.
chips	Chips is a minced oath version of shit, used to avoid saying the common English loan word "shit".
dikzak	Dikzak (literally: "fat bag") is an insult used to describe a fat person. Synonyms include vetzak (literally: "lard bag") and papzak (literally: "porridge bag").
doos	Doos means box but is slang for vagina. It is a rather mild insult to women, usually indicating stupidity. E.g. domme doos ("daft bint"). The word is also used in Afrikaans.
drol	Drol means turd. It is used for an annoying or stupid person. Flapdrol refers to a rather inexperienced, unhandy, and weak person. "Drol" is also used in Afrikaans.
eikel	Eikel (literally: "acorn") is a neutral word for male glans (originally a Latin word also meaning "acorn"). As an insult, it is in its meaning comparable to the English word "dickhead" when applied to a person, but due to the double meaning of the Dutch word (acorn or glans), it is considered much milder. It usually refers to a clumsy person who makes silly mistakes.
emmeren	Emmeren (literally: to "bucket" around) is a verb, meaning "to nag". Most people use it ignorant of its etymology and true meaning. It refers to hussars who solved the lack of women in their surroundings by standing on a bucket behind their mares to have intercourse with them. Another possible explanation refers to the term emmer (bucket) or sperma-emmer (sperm bucket) for a prostitute or a slut. Compare ouwehoeren.
ezel	Ezel (literally: "donkey") is a relatively mild insult for a person behaving in a stubborn yet unintelligent manner. Compare this with the English-language use of "ass".
flikker	Flikker as a noun in modern Dutch slang is analogous to faggot, but as its etymology stems from the analog of "trickster" it is equally often used as a verb, commonly in the context of something being dismissed or discarded, such as "flikker het weg" (throw it the fuck away), "neergeflikkerd" (fell the fuck down), or "flikker op" (fuck off; get bent). May also refer to one's ass; "op je flikker krijgen" (getting your ass beaten), "op je flikker gevallen" (fallen on your ass).
fok	Fok (literally: the first person singular of "to breed") is used as a variation of the English loan word fuck (possibly the words are etymologically related as well as the German ´ficken´). It is also used in the Afrikaans language. The Dutch news site and virtual community FOK! uses this word as its name. Also used in Afrikaans.
fuck	Fuck is an English loan word and is a common expletive, sometimes spelled fock or fak as a merger between the English and the Dutch words. Its adjective "fucking" is also commonly in use. The word is productive in Dutch: a standard variation is "fucken met" ("to fuck with").
hoer	Hoer is the Dutch word for whore. Also used in Afrikaans.
hondelul	Hondelul (literally: "dog's dick") is a variation of the more commonly heard "lul" ("dick"). First coined by Feyenoord soccer player Piet Romeijn, the insult has kept many connotations to Dutch professional soccer, and will often be heard during chants on the supporter tribunes ("Hi-ha-hondelul").
homo	Homo is an abbreviation for "homosexueel" ("homosexual") and was in the past used as a general insult or as an insult to men who behaved in a manner considered unmanly, similar to "miet(je)".
huppelkut	Huppelkut (literally: "skipping cunt") can be used to insult a woman's perceived shallowness. The word was first used by comedian Youp van 't Hek. The diminutive form huppelkutje is most commonly used. It can be seen as a comedic variation of the noun kut.
incest	Incest has the same meaning as the English word incest, and can also figuratively refer to cronyism and nepotism, where the same small group of people in top positions is protecting each other (old boys network). It can furthermore refer to circular (often fraudulent) constructions such as a VAT carrousel, money laundering, or a cash round, where money or goods are constantly exchanged between the same parties. It can also refer to strong interweaving between companies or within politics.
kak	Kak means "crap". Sometimes used as a less offensive equivalent to "shit", its more common use is as a social slur (see kakker). It is also commonly in use in the Afrikaans language ("Jy praat kak" – "You're talking shit") and South African English ("You're so full of kak."). The British English equivalent is "cack", having the same meaning and pronunciation.
kattenkop	Kattenkop (literally: "cat's head") is a mild insult commonly aimed at young girls, referring to the mean or crass characters. Compare kop. The related adjective and adverb kattig is equivalent to the English "catty".
klootzak	Klootzak (literally: "ball sack") is the scrotum, and is a common insult. It is comparable to the Irish use of "bollocks" (when used as a noun) and the Glaswegian use of "bawbag" when applied to a person. See also zak. Klojo, possibly a derivative of klootzak, means "clumsy person", or "simpleton".
klote	Klote (correctly spelled "kloten"; however, the "n" after a schwa is silent in standard Dutch, which affects the spelling of slang words) is a word for the testicles. It can be used as an expletive, as an adjective, or as an adverb. Several common expressions use the word klote, such as "ik voel me klote" ("I feel balls" – "I don't feel good"), "het examen ging naar de klote" ("the exam went to the balls" – "the exam went badly") and "het weer is klote" ("the weather is balls" – "the weather is bad"). Compare kut.
kop	Kop ("animal head") is most commonly used in the phrase "houd je kop" ("shut your mouth"). Compare bek and muil.
kreng	Kreng (literally: "cadaver") is a common insult aimed at women, and denotes mean or crass characters. It is roughly analogous to the English word "bitch".
kringspiermusketier	Kringspiermusketier (literally: "sphincter musketeer") is an insult aimed at a man of homosexual nature.
kut	Kut is a word for the vagina. It is commonly used as a curse word. It can be used as an expletive, as an adjective, or as an adverb. Several common expressions use the word kut, such as "ik voel me kut" ("I feel cunt" – "I feel like shit"), "het examen ging kut" ("the exam went cunt" – "the exam went badly") and "het weer is kut" ("the weather is cunt" – "the weather fucking sucks"). Compare klote. Its common idiomatic use in the phrase "wat kut voor je" ("how cunt for you") expresses roughly the same sentiment as the English "I'm sorry to hear that", albeit in a somewhat profane way; it could therefore be compared to "That (fucking) sucks" in English. When used as a noun to refer to a woman, the meaning of kut is analogous to the (mostly North American) English severity of the word cunt. (Huppelkut is a common comedic variation of this use.)
lamzak	Lamzak (literally: "numb sack", "numb nuts"), is used as an insult for a person that drinks (too) many alcoholic beverages. "Lam" means 'drunk'. It is also used as an insult for people who are not getting into action when they should.
lul	Lul is a word for the penis. It is used as an insult, and is roughly analogous to the English "dick" when applied to a person.
lullen	Lullen (literally: "to dick") is a verb, meaning "to talk pointlessly". It is somewhat analogous to the English phrase "to dick around". Compare ouwehoeren.
manwijf	Manwijf (literally: "man female" in contrast to "shemale") Refers to a woman who looks like a man. Sometimes also used the opposite way.
matennaaier	A matennaaier (literally: "a buddy fucker") is somebody who has screwed over one or more of his friends. Infamous historical examples include Brutus and Benedict Arnold.
mierenneuken	Mierenneuken (literally: "ant fucking") is analogous to "nitpicking". It is considered less offensive than the standalone word neuken.
muil	Muil ("large animal mouth") is most commonly used in the phrase "hou je muil" ("shut your mouth"). Compare bek and kop.
muts	Muts literally means cap, but is slang for vagina. It is a relatively mild insult to women, comparable to doos.
neuken	Neuken literally means "to fuck". It can be used neutrally, as an intimate or romantic term, or as a form of profanity.
neukertje	Neukertje is the diminutive form of the word neuker ("fucker"). Can refer to a person that the speaker is sexually involved with. It can be either used as a term of affection or as an insult, depending on context.
nicht	Nicht (literally: "female cousin" or "niece") can be used to mean "queer" (noun) or "fairy", about a homosexual man. It is commonly used within the LGBT community as a term of endearment or self-description. Its adjective and adverb are nichterig.
ouwehoeren	Ouwehoeren (literally: "to old whore") is a verb, meaning "to talk pointlessly". See also hoer, compare lullen.
paardereet	Paardereet (literally: "Horse's ass") is an insulting term for an unintelligent person.
pedo(fiel)	Pedo and pedofiel (literally: "pedophile") are sometimes used as an insult for people who molest children (who are not per se always pedophiles) or for the older partner in a relationship with a large age difference. It is also incorrectly used for opportunist sexual predators, who prey on young girls who are physically developed but under the age of consent—16 in the Netherlands).
pissig	Pissig (literally: "pissy") can mean "pissed off", "angry".
poep	Poep means "poop". Its diminutive poepje (or poepie) is used as a term of endearment comparable to "sweetie", and is not considered profane. In Belgian Dutch, the verb poepen instead means "to fuck". In Afrikaans, poep is a common term used for "fart". The noun poep is the Flemish term for "buttocks".
poes	Poes (literally: "puss", "cat") is a word for the vagina. Its diminutive poesje ("pussy") is also used. Poes is also used for "vagina" in Afrikaans.
poot	Poot ("animal leg/foot") is a word generally used to describe the leg of either an animal or a piece of furniture. More crudely, it can be used to refer to a person's hands or feet ("Blijf af met je poten" - "Keep your hands off") ("Doe je poten opzij" - "Move your legs out the way"). Additionally, poot is also a common slang term for a homosexual man, analogous to "fag".
pot	Pot can mean "homosexual woman". The term is an abbreviation of "lollepot", a firepot that women in the 16th and 17th centuries placed under their skirts to warm up their lower bodies and legs. This quickly leads to sexual jokes and slang around the use of the pot, making it a metaphor for a lesbian woman. It is somewhat more reappropriated than poot, and consequently analogous to dyke.
reet	Reet (literally: "gash", "tear") is a word for the intergluteal cleft. It is used in many common expressions, such as "ik vind er geen reet aan" ("it does not interest me at all", literally: "I find no asscrack on it"), "het interesseert me geen reet" ("it does not interest me one bit", literally: "it interests me no asscrack"), "steek het maar in je reet" ("stick it up your arse") and "ik snap er geen reet van" ("I don't understand it one bit", literally: "I understand no asscrack of it"). Compare zak.
reetkever	Reetkever (literally: "ass beetle"). Similar to kringspiermusketier.
reetridder	Reetridder (literally: "ass knight") is an insult aimed at a man of homosexual nature. It might be derived by etymological reinterpretation from the Frisian word reedrider which simply means "ice skater". Anusridder, Bruine Ridder, Anaalridder, Rugridder, and Ridder van de Bruine Dreef are variations, depending on the region.
rot-	The particle rot- can be used as an adjective when combined with a noun, and is commonly used in words such as "rothond" ("rotten dog"), "rotjoch" ("rotten kid") and "rotweer" ("rotten weather"). As a noun, rot is Amsterdam slang for "rat".
rotzak	Meaning "rotten sack" or "rotten testicles", rotzak can be used as an insult, roughly analogous to "asshole". Compare zak, klootzak.
schijt	Schijt means "shit". It is used as an exclamation, along with being as part of some common expressions: for example, schijtluis (literally: "shit louse"), schijtlijster ("shit thrush"), schijterd ("shitting person") means "chickenshit" or "coward", or "Ergens schijt aan hebben" (not caring about something, literally "to have shit on something"). See also stront.
shit	Shit is an English loan word and an extremely common expletive. It is sometimes softened to chips (pronounced ships). The word is etymologically related to "schijt" and the German "Scheiße".
slet	Slet (literally: "rag") is the Dutch word for slut. The diminutive sletje is also commonly in use. This term is commonly combined with the Dutch slangword for fellatio pijpslet, or another common variant being slettenbak (meaning is quite similar to the original).
slijmbal	A slijmbal is someone who makes exaggerated compliments, a flatterer. Akin to English slimeball, meaning ass-kisser or bootlicker. Also slijmerd, slijmjurk ("slime dress").
slons	Slons (literally: "rag") means a (usually female) person whose appearance is untidy. Its adjective is "slonzig".
sodemieter	Sodemieter refers to Sodom and Gomorrah and the perverted sexual acts that took place there according to the Old Testament. As a verb (sodemieteren) it has the same meaning as the English term sodomy, or the English slang "to sod" ("Sodemieter op" means "Sod off!"). Sodemieter or sodomiet, when used as nouns, are old-fashioned but very insulting terms for homosexual men. Furthermore, as noun, it can be used as well in the same meaning as the English "sod" ("Het kan me geen sodemieter schelen" means "I don't give a sod."). The derivative miet(je) is used as an insulting term for homosexual men, but more often as an insult to people considered cowards.
stoephoer	Stoephoer (literally: "sidewalk whore") can be used as an insult to women.
stront	Stront means "shit". It is not used as an exclamation but can be used as an adjective (for example, "strontjoch", which translates to "shit kid"), or as a part of fixed expressions such as "zak in de stront" ("sink into shit"). Unlike "shit", the word can also be used neutrally. See also schijt.
swaffelen	Swaffelen (or zwaffelen) means to hit one's partially erect penis—often repeatedly—against an object or another person's body. Swaffelen was named the word of the year in the Netherlands and Belgium in 2008.
teef	Teef means "bitch". Like in English, the word can either be a neutral term for a female dog or a strong insult aimed at women. An even stronger variant is Beftekkel (literally: "cunnilingus dachshund") which is the female variant of klootzak. Teef is also used in Afrikaans to describe "bitch".
trut	Trut is a common insult aimed at women. It was originally a slang word for vagina. It is significantly milder than kut and many people use it without realizing its true meaning (compare: tut, emmeren).
tut	Tut is a common mild insult aimed at women. It is a softer form of trut. Its diminutive tutje is also common, as is the variation tuthola. Here as well, many people use it without realizing its true meaning.
uilskuiken	Uilskuiken (literally: "owlet") is a word for a naively dumb person.
zak	Zak (literally: "sack") is a word for the scrotum and is a common insult. It is comparable to the English word "jerk" when used applied to a person. Zakkenwasser (scrotum washer) is a variant with the same meaning. Additionally, it is used in many common expressions, such as "ik vind er geen zak aan" ("it does not interest me at all", literally: "I find no sack on it"), "het interesseert me geen zak" ("it does not interest me one bit", literally: "it interests me no sack") and "ik snap er geen zak van" ("I don't understand it one bit", literally: "I understand no sack of it"). Compare reet.
zeiken	Zeiken (literally: "to piss") is a verb, meaning "to complain" or "to bitch". Also afzeiken, meaning "to insult". "Zeikerd" refers to a querulous person.

== Ethnic and social slurs ==
bamivreter	Bamivreter (meaning "bami eater", where "vreter" means animals are eating, rather than humans) is an ethnic slur used against people of Asian (mostly Chinese or Indonesian) descent.
bosneger	Bosneger (literally: "bushnegro") was originally a neutral anthropological term for Maroons from the Surinam hinterland; today it is considered derogatory. This is sometimes also referenced as "vuile bosaap" (literally: "dirty forest monkey")
fransoos	Fransoos, derived from "Français", is a lightly derogatory term for French people.
Franse slag	Franse slag (literally: "French job") is called when a task is done with the least amount of effort (and is as a result done insufficiently or inappropriately).
geitenneuker	Geitenneuker (literally: "goat fucker") is an ethnic slur against people from the Maghreb region or Middle Eastern descent, often Muslim people. See also neuken. Originally, the term was not ethnic and was a more general insult (it was used in this way in the Dutch film Amsterdamned). It was coined in this context of the ethnic slur by filmmaker and author Theo van Gogh. Bestiality is often, and not only by the Dutch, used to demonize groups of people and to portray them as depraved and undeveloped.
hangjongere	Hangjongere (literally: "a youngster hanging around") refers to youngsters who hang around in neighborhoods and cause nuisance. See also tuig which has a stronger connotation.
kaaskop	Kaaskop (a wordplay: "kaas" means "cheese", and "kop" means both "cup" and "head"; a kaaskop is the bowl in which round Dutch cheeses are made, but figuratively it refers to the round blond straight-haired heads of the Dutch) is a word for ethnically Dutch people. It is also used to refer to people originating from Alkmaar, The Netherlands.
kakker	Kakker (literally: "crapper") is a social slur, referring to people of higher social standing than the speaker, comparable to British posh. It was derived from "kouwe kak" (literally: "cold crap"), which can be used to mock someone's wealth, snobbism, or upper-class mannerisms. See also kak.
koelie	Koelie (Coolie), originally a word used in the Indies to refer to laborers, is now used as a derogatory for people of Indonesian and Hindi(-Surinamese) origins.
lijp	Lijp originated as a slur for Jewish people, based on the name Levi. Later on, it came to mean "slow", "dumb", "sluggish", and "mentally unstable". More recently, the word has also come to mean "cool" or "interesting" in youth slang.
loempiavouwer	Loempiavouwer (literally: "spring roll folder") is an insulting term for people of Vietnamese descent.
medelander	Medelander is a neologism from two words: "mede-" ("co-") and "Nederlander" ("Dutch person"). It means co-countryman. Medelander was coined as a euphemism for the word "allochtoon" (lit: "from a strange land"), which was itself coined as a euphemism for "buitenlander" ("foreigner") and "asielzoeker" ("asylum seeker"). Ironically, it is now used as a derogatory term. It is often written between scare quotes to accentuate its difference from a "Nederlander".
Mocro	Mocro is an ethnic slur and is used for people of Dutch Moroccan descent. It has largely been reappropriated.
mof	Mof is an ethnic slur used for people of German descent, comparable to kraut. It was first noted in 1574. During World War II, the word became more common. In the northern parts of the Netherlands, the word poep is used instead. A variation is moffenhoer, referring to a woman who was sexually or romantically involved with a proponent of National Socialism (see also hoer). Another variation is Mofrika, referring to Germany combining Mof and Afrika.
Mongool	As described under "illness and diseases", the word can also be considered an ethnic slur given the racist etymology behind the term Mongool for Down Syndrome. The World Health Organization (WHO) dropped the term in 1965 after a request by the delegation from the Mongolian People's Republic.
nikker / neger	Nikker is analogous to nigger—an ethnic slur referring to Black people. Like neger (which was formerly considered a neutral term by the Dutch, analogous to negro), nikker became an explicitly offensive slur. Neither "neger" nor "nikker" have been reappropriated. The term neger is usually considered offensive by black people; and like nikker is always considered offensive.
pauper	Pauper is a social slur, referring to people of low social standing. Although it is no longer in common use, the word is popular in Leiden and Delft student slang as a noun and as an adverb or adjective, meaning "trashy" or "gaudy".
pinda	Pinda (meaning "peanut") is an ethnic slur used against people of Indonesian descent.
plebejer	Plebejer is a social slur, referring to people of low social standing. Cf. English plebeian. This term is occasionally used among students when talking about people with a lower education.
poepchinees	Poepchinees (meaning "poop Chinese") is an ethnic slur used against people of Asian descent.
proleet	Proleet stems from the Latin term "proletarius", meaning someone who is very rude and uncultured, commonly of low social class. Students and highly educated people often use this term for those with a lower education.
rapalje / rapaille	Rapalje / rapaille (originally French) is a pejorative term for the lower classes. It is no longer commonly used. The term is famous for the Rapaille Partij, an anti-democratic political party that attempted to make its point by ridiculing democracy.
roetmop	Roetmop (literally: "soot mop") is an ethnic slur for black people.
spaghettivreter	Spaghettivreter (literally: "spaghetti eater", using the crude word for "eater") is an insulting term for people of Italian descent. It can be compared to wop. A variant is pastavreter ("pasta eater").
Spanjool	Spanjool (derived from "español") is a derogatory term for Spanish people, originally devised by the Geuzen to the Spanish soldiers.
spleetoog	Spleetoog (literally: "slit eye") is an insulting term for people of Asian, mostly Chinese and Indonesian descent. Also referring to Asian-style eyes as spleetogen is considered offensive.
tatta	Tatta is a pejorative term against (mostly rich) white people, meaning potato because of the stereotype that Dutch people eat a lot of potatoes.
tuig	Tuig ("scum") refers to people (mostly youngsters, compared to the milder term hangjongere) who hang around in the streets and around bars, commit petty crimes, and bother or mistreat passers-by.
Tokkie	Tokkie is used as a pejorative term for lower-class people who often are seen as likely to engage in anti-social behavior, similar to the British and Irish "chav" and the Australian "bogan". The term is derived from the surname Tokkie and came into general use when the Dutch Tokkie family gained notoriety when they were portrayed on national television in 2004 and 2005. Of this family, only the mother (Hanna Tokkie) bears the surname Tokkie. The other family members bear the surname Ruijmgaart (after the father, Gerrie Ruijmgaart).
zandneger	Zandneger ("sand negro") is an ethnic slur for people of Middle Eastern descent.
zwarte	Zwarte (literally: "black") is an ethnic slur for black people. Derived terms are zwartje (literally: "little black"), zwartnek (literally: "black neck"), and zwartjoekel (literally: "black whopper"). In Flanders, the term can also refer to wartime collaborators during WWII, possibly referring to the Italian blackshirts or the negative association of the color black. All terms are considered highly offensive.
zwartzak	Zwartzak (literally: "black sack") is an ethnic slur for people of Middle Eastern descent.

== Miscellaneous profanity ==
halvezool	Halvezool ("half sole") is a mild insult for someone who behaves unintelligently. Its etymology is unclear, but an explanation is that it is a corruption of the English asshole.
kenau	Kenau (derived from the Dutch historical figure Kenau Simonsdochter Hasselaer) refers to a bossy, hard-headed woman, used similarly to the English word "shrew" (compare: Xanthippe). The word originally referred to female bravery, but its meaning changed. The word is sometimes used by feminists as a self-applied label.
klotenklapper	klotenklapper (literally: "ballsack slapper") is a mild insult that is mostly used to describe dumb people. This is a lesser known insult
klootviool	Klootviool (literally: "scrotum viola/violin") is a mild insult that rose to prominence because of the frequent use of voice-over parodies by Mastermovies, which were very popular during the mid-2000s.
knuppel	Knuppel is a rather mild insult for someone who behaves strangely or unintelligently.
koekert/koekwaus	Koekert or koekwaus means "crazy person". It is often used in the South of the Netherlands, mostly in North Brabant. It became popularized because it was frequently used in the Dutch film New Kids Turbo.
NSB'er	NSB'er refers to the National Socialist Movement in the Netherlands (the Dutch WWII-era Nazi party). It is generally used for someone who betrays someone's actions to authorities or someone who betrays their own country or people (compare quisling or judas).
oelewapper	Oelewapper is a rather mild insult for someone who behaves strangely or unintelligently; a nincompoop. It is rarely used today.
pannenkoek	Pannenkoek ("pancake") is a mild insult for someone who is doing an inadequate job.
pipo	Pipo is a stereotypical name given to a clown. Calling someone pipo is like saying they are a clown.
smeerlap	Smeerlap (literally: "grease rag") can be used to mean "pervert", or more generally to refer to someone of questionable morality.
sukkel	Sukkel is a relatively mild insult. The meaning of this word can be compared to "wimp", "dork", or "schlemiel". It was originally Frisian. The English word "sucker" is perhaps derived from sukkel and resulted in a verb ("it sucks"). This has been translated into Dutch: het zuigt.
sul	Sul is a relatively mild insult, typically aimed at boys and men. The meaning of this word can be compared to "wimp", "dork", or "schlemiel". Its etymology is unclear.
wappie	Wappie generally means 'crazy' and has been used in recent slang to refer, for example, to one's state of being intoxicated "ik snoof me helemaal wappie" (I snorted myself crazy). During and after the COVID-19 pandemic, it was a dismissive term for people who openly subscribe to conspiracy theories due to its use by comedian Youp van 't Hek in his 2020 New Year's Eve show. Simultaneously the word—originally an adjective—became used as a noun.
wijf	Wijf is a common insult aimed at women. It originally meant "woman" (compared to English "wife"). It can be combined with other curse words, leading to common forms such as kutwijf, kankerwijf, etc., but also viswijf.
zooi	Zooi and its diminutive zooitje mean "mess". It can be used to intensify an expletive, for example in the common expressions teringzooi and kankerzooi. The variation rotzooi(tje) ("rotten mess"), however, is fairly neutral and not commonly seen as profanity. Sanders and Tempelaars (1998) additionally note the use of krijg de kankerzooi ("get the cancer-mess").
