= Gazeebow Unit =

Rap group from Newfoundland, Canada

Gazeebow Unit is a rap group from Newfoundland, Canada, founded by a group of teenagers in the provincial capital of St. John's. Gazeebow Unit uses a home computer to develop their music; they integrate samples and downloaded drum loops. The group was noted for its combination of the rap music styles with depictions of working-class Newfoundland culture and the use of the Newfoundland English dialect.

== History ==
Gazeebow Unit was formed in 2005 by young rappers from St. John's, Newfoundland; they call themselves Mike $hanx, Alpabit, and M to the C. They performed and recorded a number of satirical raps, including "Trikes & Bikes", "Mugsy" and "The Anthem". The group did not perform their music live at the time; instead they began distributing them online.

In 2006, Gazeebow Unit began performing, and appeared as part of a Donnie Dumphy concert in St. John's.

== Critical reception ==
As well as gaining a large online audience of young rap fans, Gazebow Unit's raps attracted the attention of folklore experts, including Professor Philip Hiscock of Memorial University, who declared the trio's raps to be a form of folk music, blending the new rap form with traditional Newfoundland culture and lyrics. There was disagreement, however, as to whether the members of the group were serious rappers. Academic Sandra Clarke declared that the use of Newfoundland vernacular by Gazeebow Unit was parodic, imitating the "skeet" blue-collar white culture of Newfoundland, to which the suburban youth did not actually belong. Marina Terkourafi, on the other hand, describes their use of Newfoundland dialect as metaparodic.
