= Eshay =

Slang expression associated with an Australian urban youth subculture

Eshay (/ˈɛʃeɪ/) is a slang expression associated with an Australian urban youth subculture that originated from Sydney’s inner-south, predominantly the areas around Tempe, Sydenham and St Peters in the early 1990s, but was brought into the mainstream in the late 2010s and the 2020s.

In New Zealand, "hoodrats" are a similar subculture.

== Etymology ==
The term can refer to individuals within the subculture, or to the subculture itself, and can have various other meanings in different contexts. The word "eshay" apparently derives from the Pig Latin for "sesh" (meaning cannabis smoking session). The term "adlay" (/ˈædleɪ/), Pig Latin for "lad," refers to the same subculture. The term "entays" is slang for the shoes called Nike TN's which are commonly worn by eshays.

== Description ==
Eshays, or lads, are often considered stereotypically hypermasculine and inclined to crime and violence. However, while most eshays are male, a minority of them are female. They may be affiliated with other local youths from a postcode, hang out in groups, use slang derived from Pig Latin, wear sportswear, have mullets and engage in immature and anti-social behaviour. Common fashion items include bumbags and Nike shoes (specifically Air Max Plus aka TNs). Due to the eshay subculture surrounding the shoe, wearers have been banned from some pubs and clubs. Eshays often have access to alcohol, electronic cigarettes, illegal drugs, pornography and social media (namely Snapchat and TikTok).

Typical hangout areas for eshays include bus stops, shopping centres, pubs, streets and train stations.

"Gutter rap" (also known as "lad rap" due to its popularity among eshays) is strongly associated with this subculture. Rappers in this genre include Kerser and NTER.

== See also ==
- Chav/Roadman, a similar term used to describe young delinquents in Britain
- Gopnik, a similar term used to describe young delinquents in Eastern Europe
- Skeet (Newfoundland), a similar term used in the Canadian provinces of Newfoundland and Surrey Jack in British Columbia
- Racaille, a similar term used to describe young delinquents in France.
- Hoon
- Lad culture
- Ah Beng
- Ned (Scottish)
- Talahon
