= Indonesian slang =

Slang

Colloquial Jakarta Indonesian
- Bahasa Gaul, Bahasa Indonesia Gaul, Bahasa Indonesia dialek Jakarta
- Native to: Indonesia
- Region: Indonesia, especially in urban areas, particularly Jakarta
- Language family: Austronesian: Malayo-Polynesian; Malayo-Sumbawan; Malayic; Bazaar Malay; Betawi; Colloquial Jakarta Indonesian
- Writing system: Latin

Language codes
- ISO 639-3: –
- Glottolog: cjin1234 Colloquial Jakarta Indonesian

Indonesian slang vernacular (Indonesian: bahasa gaul, Betawi: basa gaul), also known as Jakarta colloquial speech (Indonesian: bahasa informal, bahasa sehari-hari), is a term that subsumes various urban vernacular and non-standard styles of expression used throughout Indonesia that are not necessarily mutually intelligible. Regional slang from the capital of Jakarta, based on Betawi language, is however heavily exposed and promoted in national media, and considered the de facto Indonesian slang. Despite its direct origins, Indonesian slang often differs quite significantly in both vocabulary and grammatical structure from the most standard form of Indonesia's national language. These expressions are neither standardized nor taught in any formal establishments, but rather function in daily discourse, usually in informal settings. Several dictionaries of bahasa gaul has been published. Indonesian speakers regularly mix several regional slangs in their conversations regardless of origin, but depending on the audience and the familiarity level with the listeners.

== History ==
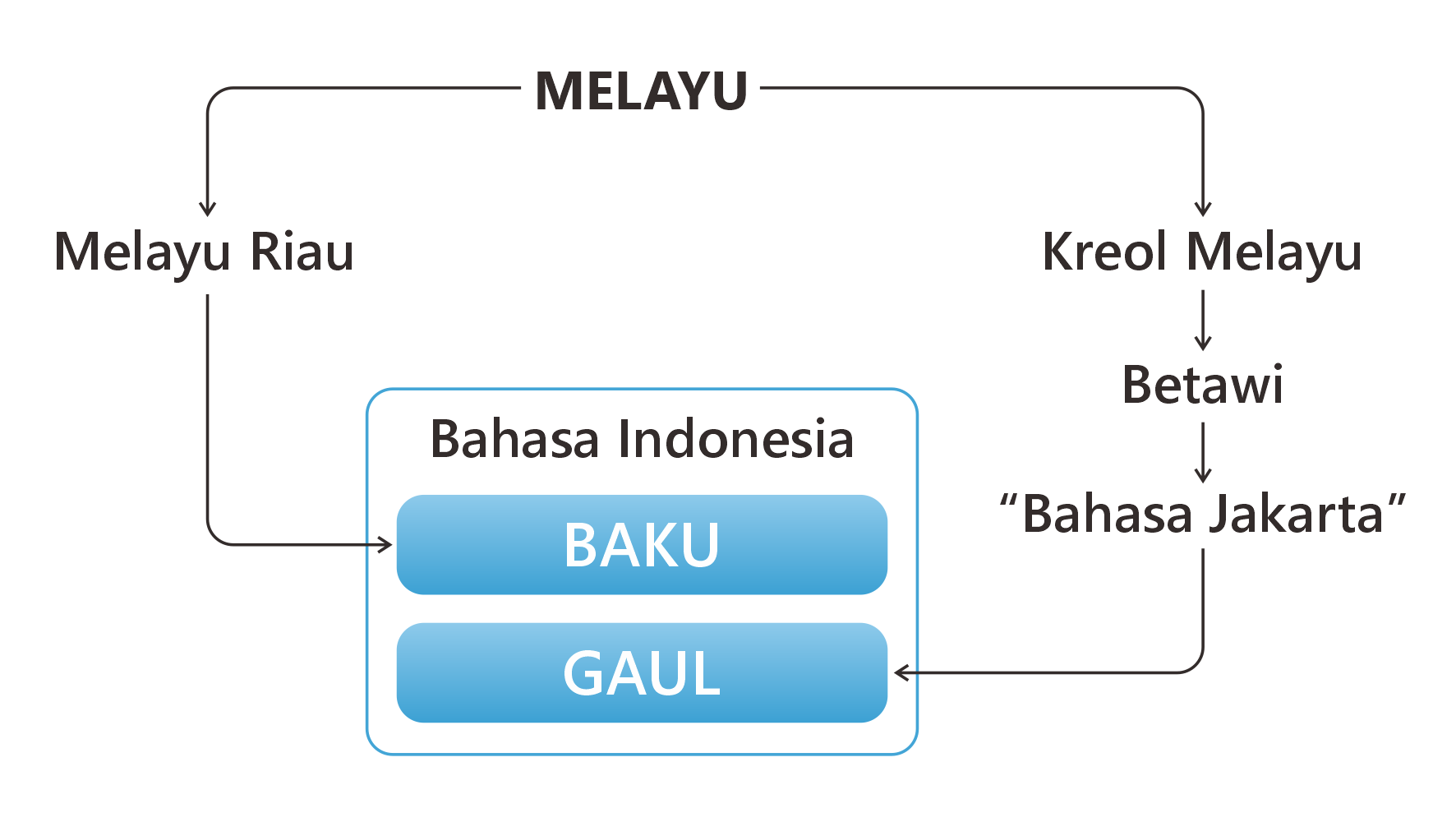
Simplified overview of progress of the development of standard Indonesian and Indonesian slang.

It is exactly unclear when the slang was first appeared in conversation. However, the earliest documented use of the slang started during the Dutch colonial era in Indonesia around the 1860s and 1870s. Its native name, bahasa gaul (the 'social language'), was a term coined in the late 1990s where bahasa means 'language' and gaul means 'social', 'cool' or 'trendy'. Similarly, the term bahasa prokem (a more outdated name for Indonesian slang) created in the early 1970s means 'the language of gangsters'. Prokem is a slang form of the word préman 'gangster' and was derived from the Dutch word vrijman, which literally means 'freeman'.

Indonesian slang is predominantly used in everyday conversation, social milieus, among popular media and, to a certain extent, in teen publications or pop culture magazines. For those living in more urbanized regions of Indonesia, Indonesian slang language often functions as the primary language medium for communication in daily life. While it would be unusual to communicate orally with people on a casual basis with very formal Indonesian, the use of proper or 'good and correct' Indonesian (bahasa Indonesia yang baik dan benar) is abundant in the media, government bodies, schools, universities, workplaces, amongst some members of the Indonesian upper-class or nobility and also in many other more formal situations.

Indonesian slang has evolved rapidly. This is, in part, due to its vocabulary that is often so different from that of standard Indonesian and Malaysian and also because so many new words (both original and foreign) are quite easily incorporated into its increasingly wide vocabulary list. However, as with any language, the constant changing of the times means that some words become rarely used or are rendered obsolete as they are considered to be outdated or no longer follow modern day trends.

== Classification ==
At present, there is no formal classification for Indonesian slang language but it is purportedly and erroneously claimed by many to be essentially a manipulated and popularized form of the Indonesian (the national language of Indonesia). This is not true in the case of Jakartan bahasa gaul, as it is primarily based on the Betawi language.

Indonesian is part of the Western Malayo-Polynesian subgroup of the Malayo-Polynesian branch of the Austronesian languages. According to the Ethnologue, Indonesian is modelled after Riau Malay, a form of Old Malay originally spoken in northeast Sumatra. Betawi language is classified as Malay-based creole.

== Geographic distribution ==
Indonesian slang language is mostly spoken in urban regions of the Indonesian archipelago. It also spoken in some Indonesian soap operas and animated television series (such as Tukang Ojek Pengkolan or Adit Sopo Jarwo). Variations of slang language can be found from city to city, mainly characterised by derivatives of the different local ethnic languages. For example, in Bandung, West Java, the local slang language contains vocabulary from the Sundanese language, while the slang found in Jakarta tends to be heavily influenced by English or the old Batavian dialect (i.e. the language of the original inhabitants of Jakarta or Batavia as it was known during the Dutch colonial period). For more information relating to the geographic distribution of Indonesian slang and regional influences, please see "Region Specific Slang" below.

== Official status ==
Indonesian slang language is not an official language of Indonesia. However, it is claimed as a modified form of the Indonesian language and is widely used for everyday communication and in informal situations. Sometimes it is mixed with formal Indonesian in formal situations, except during state ceremonies, business meetings, and sacred prayers. A number of Indonesians sometimes speak a mixture of Indonesian slang and formal Indonesian in everyday conversation and informal situations.

== Writing ==
Indonesian slang generally uses the same pronunciation as standard Indonesian, although there are many influences from regional dialects on certain aspects such as accent and grammatical structure. Loan words adopted from foreign languages (especially European) such as English or Dutch are often transliterated according to the modern Indonesian orthography. For example, the word "please" is often written as plis. Another closely related phenomenon to arise in recent years is the formation of complex nouns or phrases created using a combination of English and Indonesian (slang) in the one sentence. A prime example of this is the phrase "so what gitu loh!", meaning "who cares?!" or quite simply "so what!" with added emphasis from the phrase "gitu loh". Gitu is an abbreviated form of the Indonesian word begitu meaning 'like that/such as', while loh (also spelt lho) is a particle commonly used in slang or conversational Indonesian to show surprise or instigate a warning. In these cases of combined, interlingual phrases, the original spelling (and quite often the pronunciation) of the foreign word(s) are retained. Hence, the English component of the Indonesian slang phrase "so what gitu loh!" remains relatively unchanged as far as spelling and pronunciation are concerned.

== Grammar ==
The overall structure of Indonesian slang is not all that different from formal Indonesian, although in many cases sentences are simplified or shortened when necessary. The differences between formal and colloquial Indonesian are most evident in vocabulary and grammatical structures (e.g. affixes).

== Vocabulary ==
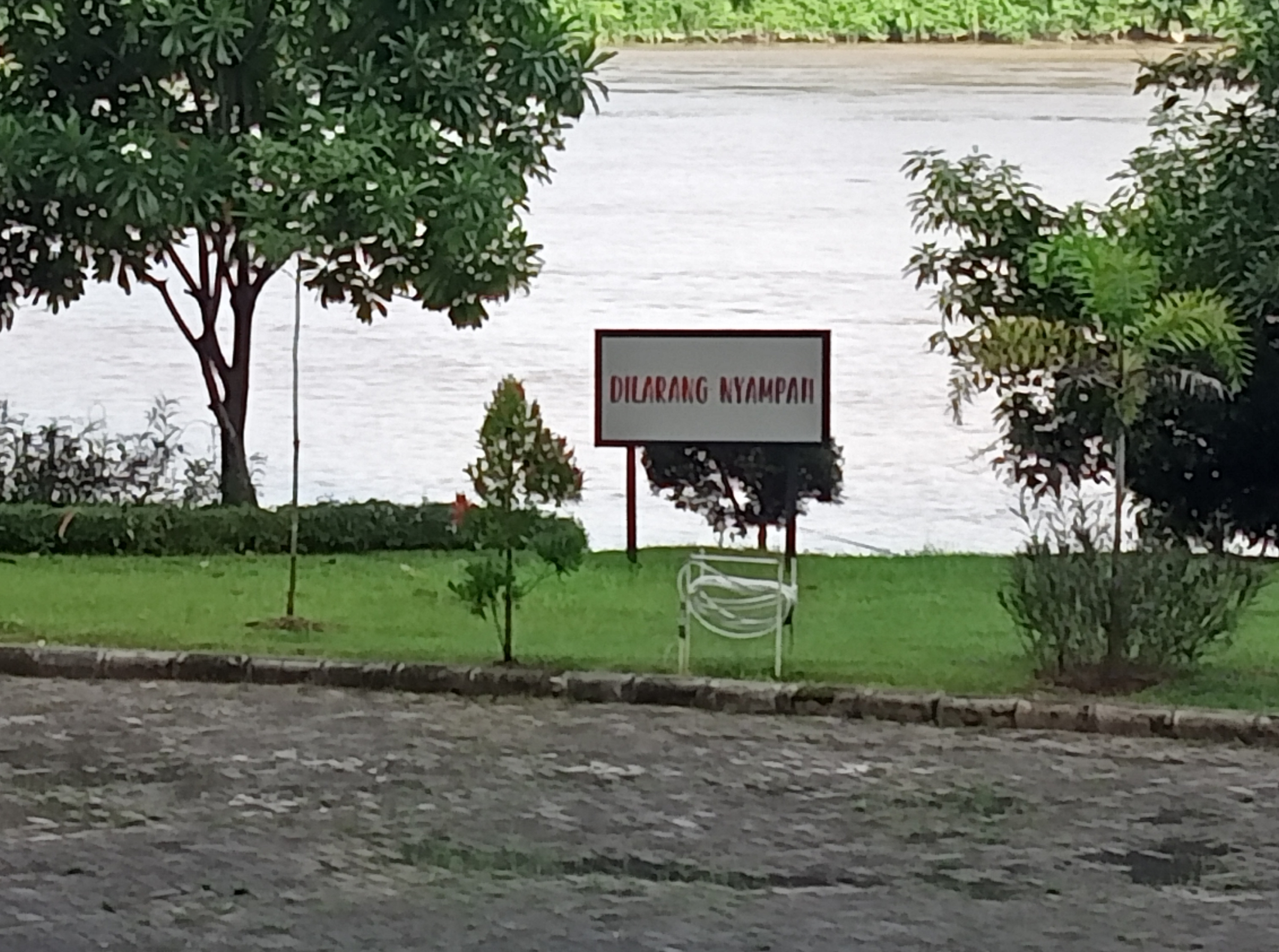
No littering sign at Big Mall, Samarinda, East Kalimantan, with colloquial Indonesian features: DILARANG NYAMPAH ('do not litter').

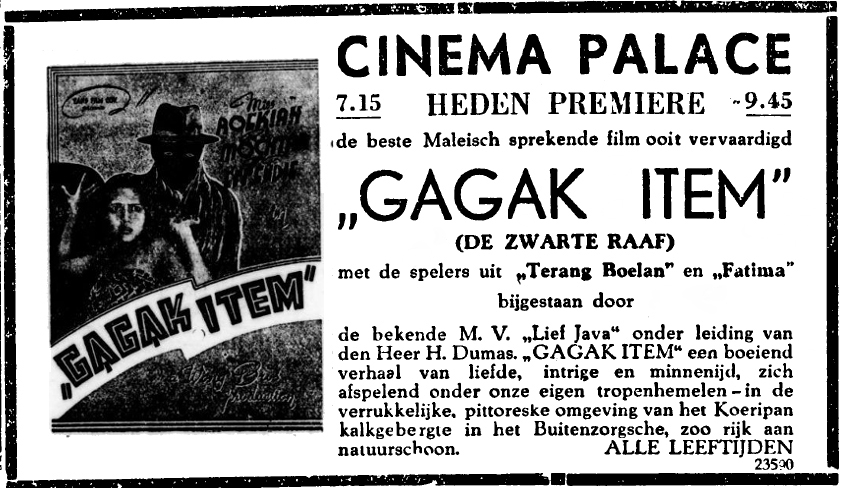
A film with a title Gagak Item, which released in 1939. The word item is still used today in Indonesian slang.

The structure of the Indonesian slang language is mostly derived from formal Indonesian. However, its vocabularies are different story altogether. Indonesian slang vocabularies are enriched by a combination of derivatives or loan words/structures from foreign languages such as Min Nan commonly referred to as Hokkien, English, and Dutch, as well as local ethnic languages such as Batavian, Sundanese, and Javanese. However, in many cases, new words are simply created at random and their origins often quite obscure.

A large proportion of the vocabulary used in Indonesian slang language was developed from formal Indonesian through several methods, most of which are listed below:

- Shortening the prefix men-, me-, mem-, or meng- into n- or nge- (Javanese and Betawi influence). For example:
  - mengambil → ngambil 'to take' (from ambil 'to take')
  - menyapu → nyapu 'to sweep' (from sapu 'broom')
  - merasa → ngerasa 'to feel' (from rasa 'taste; feel')
  - membuat → ngebuat 'to make' (from buat 'to make')
  - menutup → nutup 'to close' (from tutup 'close')
- Replacing the suffix -kan or -i with -in (Balinese and Betawi influence). For example:
  - menanyakan → nanyain 'to ask about something' (from tanya 'to ask')
  - diajari → diajarin 'to be taught' (from ajar 'to teach')
- Using ke- at the beginning of non-volitional passive verbs instead of using ter-. For example:
  - tertangkap → ketangkep 'to be caught' (from tangkap 'to catch')
  - terpeleset → kepeleset 'to accidentally slip' (from peleset 'to miss a target')
- Elimination of s or h from a word. For example:
  - habis → abis 'deleted, emptied'
  - tahu → tau 'to know'
  - hitung → itung 'count'
  - hitam → item 'black'
  - hijau → ijo 'green'
  - sudah → udah 'already'
  - saja → aja 'just'
  - lihat → liat 'see'
- Contraction of two or more words into one word or abbreviation. For example:
  - terima kasih → makasih 'thank'
  - gak jelas → gaje 'not clear, absurd'
  - males gerak → mager 'lazy' (lit. 'lazy to move')
  - bokap-nyokap → bonyok 'parents' (lit. 'father-mother')
  - sange gak ketampung → sagapung or segapung 'hypersex' (lit. ''losing control about their own sex arousal'').
  - ewe bo'ol/entot di bo'ol → ebol 'anal intercourse (for consensual anal intercourse), sodomy (for non-consensual anal intercourse)'
  - buka paha tinggi-tinggi → bupati (showing their thighs off).
  - sekitaran wilayah dada → sekwilda (breast)
  - percaya diri → pd or pede 'confidence'
  - gerak cepat → gc or gercep 'hurry up'
  - hand phone → hp or hape 'any kind of cellphone'
- Altering the pronunciation of [a] in some final closed syllables into [ə] (Javanese, Betawi, and Sundanese influence; in many cases this revived the old Proto-Malayic syllable -əC). For example:
  - tangkap → tangkep 'to catch'
  - benar → bener 'correct'
  - pintar → pinter 'smart'
  - malas → males 'lazy'
  - segar → seger 'fresh'
  - cepat → cepet 'fast'
  - hitam → item 'black'
  - diam → diem 'shut up', 'silence'
  - ingat → inget 'remember'
  - sambal → sambel 'chili sauce'
  - dekat → deket 'near'
- Altering the pronunciation of i into e (Peranakan influence). For example:
  - ingin or pingin → pengen, 'want'
  - naik → naek 'up'
  - kemarin → kemaren 'yesterday'
  - baik → baek 'good'
- Altering the pronunciation of u into o. For example:
  - belum → belom or belon, 'not yet'
  - telur → telor, 'egg'
- Contracting a diphthong into a monophthong (monophthongization). For example:
  - kalau → kalo 'if'
  - kacau → kaco 'chaotic'
  - galau → galo 'confusion'
  - hijau → ijo 'green'
  - pakai → pake 'to use'
  - sampai → sampe 'until'
  - cabai → cabe 'chilli'
  - capai → capek 'tired'
- Addition and exclusion of silent consonants and glottal stops to the beginning/end of a word, usually in speech. For example:
  - kalo [kalɔ] → [kalɔʔ]
  - pake [pakɛ] → [pakɛʔ]
  - sampe [sampɛ] → [sampɛʔ]
- Making of a prokem word by adding -ok- infix. For example:
  - bapak → bokap 'father'
  - nyak or enyak → nyokap 'mother' (a special case where the consonant /k/ become /p/ to make it rhyme with bokap)
  - jual → jokul 'to sell'
  - berak → boker 'to defecate'
  - sapa → sokap 'who' (sapa is a colloquial word of siapa 'who')
  - polisi → plokis 'police'
  - sini → sokin 'come in'
  - tua → toku 'old' (originated from MAPALA UI, an environmentalist and adventure students club at University of Indonesia)
- Reversing the phoneme or syllable order from a word. For example:
  - sange → engas 'sexually aroused'
  - anjing → jingan 'fuck (interjection)' (lit. 'dog')
  - lumayan → nayamul 'not bad'
  - bego → ogeb 'stupid'
  - sikat → takis 'to take something'
  - selow → woles 'relax; taking easy' (from English word "slow")
  - bang → ngab 'older brother; bro' (shortened form of abang 'older brother')
  - mabok → kobam 'drunk'
  - bisa → sabi 'can, be able to'
  - yuk or yuks → kuy or skuy 'let's go, come on'
  - mobil → libom 'car'
  - miskin → kismin 'poor'
  - enak → kane 'delicious'
  - satu, dua, tiga → utas, aud, agit 'one, two, three' (in this context, satu or utas means a freshman in Senior High School; aud or dua means a sophomore in Senior High School; while agit or tiga means a penultimate or senior in Senior High School).
- Some words are simply loaned from English. For example:
  - amazing → emejing
  - and → n
  - backhoe → beko
  - babe → beb or beibeh
  - basically → besikli
  - be like → bilek
  - bother → bader
  - break → brek
  - brother → bro
  - by the way → btw or betewe
  - cancel → kenseul or cancel
  - check it out → cekidot
  - clear → klir
  - copy paste → kupipes
  - culture → kalcer
  - damn → dayum
  - double → dobel
  - expect → espek
  - follow back → folbek
  - friend → fren or pren
  - healing → hiling
  - I'm addicted to you → Amadiketiu
  - level → lepel
  - mention → mensyen
  - on the way → otw or otewe
  - page one → pejwan
  - please → plis
  - pleasure → plesir
  - possible → posibel
  - scam → sekem
  - school → skul
  - septic tank → sepiteng
  - simple → simpel
  - sister → sis
  - slow → selow
  - sorry → sori
  - swear → suer
  - thank you → tenkyu
  - triple → tripel
  - welcome → welkam
- Some words are also loaned from Chinese languages (mainly Hokkien and Mandarin). For example:
  - airen 'future son-in-law/daughter-in-law' (Chinese: 爱人)
  - amsyong 'bad luck' (Chinese: 暗傷; a loan word from Hokkien and often used with emphasis)
  - angpau/angpao 'monetary gift' (Chinese: 紅包; lit. 'red envelope'; a gift usually given during holidays or special occasions, stemmed from tradition done by Chinese community)
  - auban 'stubborn' (Chinese: 拗蠻)
  - bo 'no; don't have' (Chinese: 無; it is often used with another descriptive noun/adjective, for example bo huat 無法 'unable', bo kam guan 'not sincerely willing to let go off something')
  - ce or cik 'respected elder sister' (Chinese: 姐)
  - cece 'biological elder sister' (Chinese: 姐姐)
  - cengli 'fair, make sense' (Chinese: 情理; lit. 'reason', 'sense')
  - cuan 'earn, profit' (Chinese: 賺)
  - duibuci 'really sorry' (Chinese: 對不起)
  - hauce 'delicious, tasty' (Chinese: 好吃)
  - hauce sèn cin ping 'extremely/overly delicious' (Chinese: 好吃神经病; the phrase is derived from Indonesian popular slang expression enak gila (from enak 'delicious' and gila 'crazy, insane'), with shén jīng bìng (神经病) literally means 'crazy, insane')
  - ho ciak 'delicious, tasty' (Chinese: 好食)
  - kamsia 'thank you' (Chinese: 感謝; a loan word from Hokkien)
  - kepo 'busybody' (Chinese: 家婆; a slang from Taiwanese Hokkien, has a backronym "knowing every particular object")
  - ko or koh 'respected elder brother' (Chinese: 哥)
  - koko 'biological elder brother' (Chinese: 哥哥)
  - kongkow 'hanging out with casual chatting' (Chinese: 空口, lit. 'empty mouth'; a slang from Indonesian Hokkien to describe a casual social gathering characterized by light conversation and the occasional sharing of personal achievements, sometimes accompanied by bragging and flexing)
  - sekia 'kids' (Chinese: 細囝; a slang from Indonesian Hokkien to describe someone who has not yet reached puberty)
  - toke/tauke 'boss' (Chinese: 頭家)
- Some words originated from the LGBT community (especially among transvestites) usually have word ending -ong. This either come from the pattern of changing the vocal of the penult into [ɛ] and replacing the rime of the ultima with -ong, or entirely different origin. This was also an attempt among LGBT community to alter the words to become more "French-sounding", thus sounding more sexy. For example:
  - Berapa? → Berapose? 'How much, exactly?'
  - dandan → dendong 'to dress up'
  - gede → gedong 'big'
  - gratis → gretong/gretongan 'free; cost-free'
  - homo → hemong 'homosexual'
  - jam → jambore 'hour'
  - keluar → klewong 'to ejaculate' (from keluar 'to go out')
  - laki → lekong 'male; metrosexual man'
  - mau → mrong 'want; sexual activity' (the meaning 'sexual activity' comes from the onomatopoeia of a cat sound (méong) during sexual intercourse)
  - Mengapa? → Mengapose? 'Why, anyway?'
  - sakit → sekong 'homosexual' (from sakit 'sick')
  - sepong 'fellatio' (from isep, colloquial form of hisap 'to suck')
  - taksi → teksong 'taxi'
  - tempong or tembong 'anal sex' (from tembak 'to shoot' and bokong 'ass')
  - tidur → tidore 'sleep'

=== Others ===
Many words also emerged without following the above rules at all or have their own unique history and/or origin not related to its literal meaning. For example:

- +1 'used to express that you agree'
- -1 'used to express that you don't agree'
- Abal-abal 'counterfeit goods, but the quality is too low level'
- ABG or abege 'teenager' (from anak baru gede, lit. 'recently grown up kid')
- Ae mate! 'OMG!'
- anabul (from anak bulu lit. 'furry children', an affectionate term for pets, mainly cats and dogs)
- anjay, anjir, anjrit, anjas, bejir etc. 'wow (interjection)' (from the profanity anjing 'dog' usually used as a negative interjection, the change in its rhyme gives a slightly positive meaning)
- Atapu 'I love you'
- backstreet 'to date in secret'
- B aja 'not too good but also not bad'
- baper 'touchy' (from bawa perasaan lit. 'to take feelings')
- banget, from Javanese banget 'very'
- bapuk 'poor quality; useless; stale; lame; outdated'
- barudak 'guys'
- basian 'hangover'
- beking 'powerful connections; protection from someone; political patronage'
- beud 'very' (from banget 'very'; this word has become popular after Indonesia's fast food chain, CFC coined the word on one of their television advertisement)
- Blangwir 'Firefighter' (from Dutch Brandweer 'Fire Department')
- bobi from botak biadab lit. 'savage bald' (a bald man)
- bokep 'blue film' (from the abbreviation of "blue film", BF, which is read as bé-èf or bé-èp then transformed into a prokem word using infix -ok-)
- borju 'socialite' (from Russian: буржуй 'rich person')
- BT or bete 'tedious' (from Indonesian bosan total 'totally boring' and English bad temperament)
- bucin 'lovesick' (from budak cinta lit. 'slave to love')
- Bujang enam 'jerk' (popularized by celebrity Pascol)
- bumil from ibu hamil (lit. 'pregnant mother', a pregnant woman)
- busui from ibu menyusui (lit. 'nursing mother', a breastfeeding woman)
- cacing-cacing naga-naga 'full power; using all available resources' (popularized by capitalist Andry Hakim)
- capcus 'let's go' (from cabut 'to pull off something', colloquially means 'to go'; popularized by LGBT community)
- caw 'depart'
- cedai or cewek badai 'a term denoting those cool girls whose style is always on point'
- cemen 'timid'
- cepu 'snitcher'
- cetar 'amazing'
- chuaks (a vocalization of someone who wants to spit; used to dismiss someone else's argument, made popular by Reza "Coki" Pardede, an Indonesian comic and Majelis Lucu Indonesia, an Indonesian stand-up comedy community)
- ciyus 'serious' (from serius 'serious')
- coli (from cabang olahraga lima jari lit. 'five finger sport' or kocok peli lit. 'shaking penis', male masturbation)
- colmek (from colok memek lit. 'sticking vagina', fingering or female masturbation)
- cupu 'out of date, not trendy; nerd' (from culun punya lit. 'has nerdy attribute', culun 'out of date; nerd' and punya 'to have, to possess'; it became popular after Indonesia's beverage brand, Pop Ice, coined it in their television advertisement in 2007)
- darting 'in a high blood pressure condition'
- debay 'baby'
- demen 'really like' (from Dutch demen 'crush' and Javanese děměn 'like')
- despo 'desperate'
- doang from Betawi doang 'just'
- doi 'crush'
- Eskelemente 'I must admit that I was not entirely truthful with them/him/her' (from Spanish Es que le mentí 'The thing is, I lied to them/him/her'; often used to express feelings of disappointment and frustration)
- gacha 'random; luck and chance; very inconclusive results' (from Japanese: ガチャ ゲーム (gacha gēmu) 'a type of video game that implements the gachapon machine style mechanics')
- gacor 'excellent in quality, different from others, and brings new ideas' (a portmanteau of classic Dutch Groot • Adel • Cierlijk • Onderscheiding • Roem 'Greatness • Nobility • Elegance • Distinction • Fame' and also Javanese Garingan Corong 'crisp funnel/mouth'; it was originally used to assess the quality of songbirds, but later came to be used in reference to slot machines gambling and their community (since the 1990s), then expanded to the online taxi community to describe how easy it is to get passenger orders, and eventually came to be used in all sorts of contexts)
- garing 'lame, corny' (from garing 'dry')
- gaskeun or gaskan 'let's go' (from gegaskan 'let's rushing')
- gebetan 'crush' (from gebet 'to approach, to get closer to someone', itself a slang)
- gemoy 'cute' (from gumush 'adorable')
- GDLV or gedeelve 'not sent; pending' (from Indonesian nggak 'not' and English delivered)
- gengges 'annoying'
- girlies 'riverbank area' (from Indonesian pinggir-kali and English -es (an ending used to form the regular English plural))
- GPP or gapapa 'no worries; it's fine'
- GR or geer 'to have a prejudice about itself' (from gede rasa lit. 'to have a big feeling')
- guguk 'dog'
- hacep 'the event was successful because it was crowded' (from Indonesian pecah (backward spelling) 'shattered'; this term usually for party event)
- Hari H or Hari Hajat or Hari Hajatan 'The big day of the event' (from Indonesian Hari 'Days' and Arabic: (Al-ḥājāt) الحاجات, lit. 'necessities'; this term usually for very sacral event by individuals in Indonesia, such as Ngunduh Mantu, so 'H-5' read as Hajat minus 5 (days))
- hode from homo dewa lit. 'gay god' (a man pretending to be a woman online, catfish)
- imba 'too cool' (from Russian: имба 'overpowered')
- in this economy 'being financially constrained; spending cutbacks' (a very shortened version of the phrase: "Because I am not particularly well-off, and for the sake of saving money and cutting costs in this current economy, which is experiencing a slowdown!")
- iyalagi 'relate'
- jackpot or jack pot 'vomiting'
- jebakan betmen 'prank' (lit. 'Batman's trap')
- jet coster 'metaphors to describe a situation, emotion, or a changing relationship very quickly and drastically' (from Japanese: ジェットコースター (jetto kōsutā) 'roller coaster')
- jijay 'disgusting, grotesque' (from jijik 'disgusting'; sometimes used to express a condition of 'utmost disgust', used in the phrase "jijay bajay" or "anjay jijay")
- jilboob (portmanteau of jilbab and boobs, women wearing hijab but with tight fitting clothing that highlights their chest)
- jomblo or jombs 'single' (from Sundanese jomblo 'unable to sell (the product); unrequited')
- josjis 'fantastic'
- julid 'envy and jealousy toward someone else's success' (from Sundanese binjulid 'envy and jealousy in the heart'; this term hugely popularized by celebrity Syahrini)
- jutek 'sassy; rude'
- kapal-kapalan 'the romantic relationship between two people' (from kapal lit. 'ship'; the relationship can be really serious, or just for fun, or a staged (setup/gimmick) relationship for content; kapal berlayar lit. 'the ship sails' 'the relationship is showing signs of closeness', kapal berlabuh lit. 'anchored ship' 'the relationship is officially engaged, or married', and kapal karam lit. 'shipwrecks' 'the relationship is could not possibly reunite in the real world')
- keleus 'maybe yes'
- kenti 'penis' (from kontol 'penis')
- kere hore 'the budget isn't huge, but the results are satisfying'
- ketengan 'budget-friendly retail packages for specific goods/services, like an internet data plans, etc.'
- kewl 'cool'
- kicep 'unable to say anything'
- kicer 'lose focus'
- kimpoi 'sexual intercourse' (from kawin 'to have sex')
- kinclong 'shiny; good looking'
- Kolay 'Please, call me'
- kontol 'penis' (from Javanese kuntul 'egret')
- kopdar 'offline meet-up'
- koplak 'silly'
- KW or kwalitas 'counterfeit goods' (a portmanteau of German Kopierte Werke or Dutch geKopieerde Werken 'copied works' and Indonesian affix -alitas 'characteristics')
- Lambretta Lamborghini 'so slowly' (from Lambretta and Lamborghini)
- lebay 'overacting' (from lebih 'more' with exaggerated English pronunciation imitation, or from Sumatran Malay labaih/lebaih 'excessive; crossing the line')
- lesbiola 'lesbian' (from lesbi 'lesbian', extended into the word les biola lit. 'violin course')
- maho 'gay men' (from manusia homo 'homosexual man')
- magabut 'a person who is lazy at work or not doing anything, but still gets paid in full' (from makan gaji buta lit. 'eating a salary with blind eyes')
- manchay 'so cool'
- manjiw or mantap jiwa 'satisfying'
- mantul or mantap betul 'excellent'
- mantap mantap 'sexual intercourse'
- Masuk Pak Eko! 'to praise a success, or something that meets the target' (it originated from the children’s shouts in a viral video praising the accuracy of a sharp object thrown by a police officer named AKP Eko Hari Cahyono)
- matre 'materialistic' (from materialistik)
- meleyot 'limp due to side effect of overadmiration; smitten'
- memek 'vagina' (from Sundanese momok 'vagina' in polite form)
- metyaw 'congratulation'
- miapa or miapah 'really?' (from demi apa lit. 'by which are you swearing?')
- micin 'excessive; over-enthusiastic'
- Mimin 'Administrator' (from Mr. Admin (Mister Admin); it is often used mainly on the internet and social media to interact with the person responsible for certain groups/forums, online shops, online customer service, etc.)
- minder 'inferiority complex due to low self-esteem' (from Dutch minderwaardig 'inferior; third-rate')
- modus or modal dusta 'the act of deceptive tactics, by providing false information or conveying a false impression when engaged in an action or activity'
- mokel 'eating or drinking prematurely; eating or drinking while fasting' (from mode kelaparan lit. 'starvation mode')
- najis tralala 'disgusting; terrifying; awful'
- ngacir 'run fast, go quickly, or escape'
- ngentot 'fuck' (from Ngencan Total lit. 'love total'; this term hugely popularized between 1980s which used slang language by teens in those days)
- nggak level or gak lepel 'at a different level of condition; not up to par' (from Indonesian nggak 'not' and English level)
- nguli 'grinding; up-skilling; work hard to earn money'
- nolep (from English no life, a person with no social life)
- nongkrong 'hang out'
- ojol from ojek online lit. 'online motorcycle taxi', (motorcycle taxi (ojek) rider who uses applications such as Gojek or Grab)
- omon-omon 'chatter or nonsense' (in polite form)
- open BO (from open Booking Online, a term for ordering sex worker online)
- oshi 'role model' (from Japanese: 推し (oshi) 'which is to recommend; most favored persona'; this word has undergone shifts from its original meaning and refers to someone who plays a significant role in changing a way of life)
- pansi (shortened from "apaan sih?!"; to express annoyance. Similar to the English slang the heck from What the Heck?!)
- pargoy 'dancing together in unison' (from partai goyang lit. 'swaying party')
- parno 'paranoia'
- patungan 'split costs'
- PDKT or pedekate 'hitting on someone (romantic)' (from pendekatan 'approach'; has a backronym of pede (from percaya diri 'confident') and kate 'talk')
- peres 'reluctant; not wholehearted'
- plenger 'abnormal'
- pordebel 'cheap'
- pundung 'sulking'
- rebek 'difficult to handle'
- roaming 'hanging out together, but unable to follow when someone is talking about a topic' (from English roaming 'moving freely from place to place')
- saklek 'unyielding to compromise' (from Dutch zakelijk 'professionally; objective')
- salting 'a situation in which a person feels nervous, awkward, or unsure of how to behave'
- satset 'quick, agile and nimble'
- sebelas dua belas 'very synonymous with someone/something'
- sefruit 'conjunctions used to mark objects, events, ideas, and emphasize them (which indicates an important point)' (from Indonesian prefix se- 'to declare' and English fruit)
- segede gaban 'very big' (lit. 'as big as Gaban'; Gaban comes from the main protagonist of the Japanese Tokusatsu series called Space Sheriff Gavan, which become a hit in Indonesia in the 1980s, but the term itself started appearing in the 1990s when an approximately 10-meter-tall (33 ft) statue of Gavan was erected in Jakarta's theme park, Dunia Fantasi)
- sekut 'afraid; cool; come on; panic' (popularized by celebrity Gofar Hilman)
- selingkuh 'a married person commits adultery' (from selingan indah (ganggu) keluarga utuh lit. 'beautiful interludes (disturb) the whole family unity'; this term hugely popularized between 1980s which used slang language by adults in those days)
- setengki 'a half of it'
- Sevel '7-Eleven, Inc.' (from Seven Eleven)
- sikon 'circumstances' (from English situations and conditions)
- sori dori mori stroberi 'rejecting a request (in a joking tone)'
- sotil 'a know-it-all'
- STW (from setengah tuwir lit. 'half old', an older romantic partner, typically a woman)
- sue 'unlucky; cursed'
- suhu 'expert' (from Sanskrit सूहु (sūhu), lit. 'generous giver')
- riil 'used to confirm that something is true or shareable'
- tajir 'filthy rich' (from Arabic: تَاجِر, lit. 'merchant, trader')
- tante girang (lit. 'excited aunt', a mature woman seeking a younger male partner)
- telmi 'slow-witted' (from telat mikir lit. 'too late to think')
- tengsin 'awkward'
- tepos (lit. 'flat', flat chest or bottom)
- tobrut from toket brutal lit. 'brutal breasts' or toge from toket gede lit. 'big breasts' (women with large breasts)
- tocil from toket kecil lit. 'small breasts' (flat-chested women or women with small breasts)
- T-O-P B-G-T 'really cool; awesome' (from Dutch toppie 'cool' and Javanese banget 'very'; the spelling reading of top bgt, the colloquial spelling of top banget 'really cool' used in texting)
- tralala 'extremely' (from Indonesian terlalu 'too')
- TTM or tete'em 'intimate friend' (from Teman Tapi Mesra lit. 'friend but romantic'; this term hugely popularized by a Ratu music video, sometimes also associated as casual sex partner or friends with benefits)
- tubir 'uproar (like a storm)' (from Indonesian ribut (backward spelling) 'severe weather or storm; disturbance', the original meaning of tubir is 'the lip of the abyss')
- tulalit 'not responding'
- unyu 'adorable; so cute' (from Javanese munyuk 'monkey')
- vibe 'impression from the other side' (from English vibes, the atmosphere of a place or event)
- YNTKTS or Ya Nggak Tau Kok Tanya Saya lit. 'Well, I don’t know, don’t ask me.'; the answer as shortcut that basically just attempt to avoid being questioned further. Originated from former president Joko Widodo when he answered a question by an interviewer in Javanese dialect; it was made viral by a gas station in Bogor.
- YTTA or Yang Tau Tau Aja lit. 'for people who know it only'; a situation where others may not have inside knowledge. Similar to the English slang If you know, you know (IYKYK)
- zeeb 'alright; sure'

==== Pejoratives ====
Some of these slang words have also evolved into pejorative words.

- alay 'tacky; garish; drama queen' (from anak layangan, lit. 'kite kid'; used to describe the appearance associated with lower class children often spending their time outside and getting sunburnt, but then get a broader meaning)
- anak abah lit. 'children of abah', (supporters of Anies Baswedan, who is also known as abah (Arabic for 'father'), some supporters of Anies also use the term as a symbol of pride for their support, rather than in a pejorative way)
- anak wabah lit. 'children of plague' (supporters of Anies, wabah being an intentional misspelling of abah)
- asupan tera 'a pejorative term for contexts that are hyperloaded with negative digital content' (from Indonesian asupan 'intake' and English terabyte'; it's getting even bigger with internet sites that offer insanely large storage, like a TeraBox or Baidu Cloud)
- bang jago (from abang 'older brother' and jago 'champion; master'; used to end any argument in a passive-aggressive and ad hominem manner)
- Banglasia (originally from the Malaysian film of the same name; a pejorative name for Malaysia)
- bispak 'slut, female prostitute' (from the abbreviation of bisa dipakai lit. 'able to be used')
- boti or boty (from bottom, male receptive partner)
- botol 'foolish, stupid' (from the acronym of "bodoh" and "tolol")
- buzzeRp 'political buzzer' (a portmanteau of buzzer politik 'political buzzer' and Rupiah)
- cabe-cabean 'slut' (from cabe lit. 'chili', from the abbreviation of cewek alay bisa diewe lit. 'alay girl that can be fucked'; the term derived from teen motorbike gang/underground racing subculture where sometimes the ante was the racers' girlfriends and the winner could sleep with her)
- cacing ungu 'a pejorative name for Bulletproof Boy Scouts fans'
- cebong (lit. 'tadpole'; a pejorative name for Joko Widodo's supporters)
- cegil or cewek gila 'a pejorative term to refer a normal girls who suddenly become violent (obsessive, possessive, manipulative, and aggressive), sometimes due to past trauma and is linked to emotions of love or attraction'
- decul (from dede Cules/Culers), used by Madridista to ridicule Cules/Culers. Similarly, demit or dedemit (from dede Madridista) used by Cules/Culers to poke fun at Madridista. Both of these words usually said at El Clásico.
- fafifu wasweswos or fa fi fu was wes wos 'nonsensical', 'gibberish'.
- Fesnuk 'a pejorative name for Facebook'
- generasi micin 'born between the 1980s and 2000s'
- go to isekai 'a drop dead because of suicide' (from English go to and Japanese: 異世界 (isekai) 'another world')
- halo, dek or halodek, an epithet for Indonesian policeman and soldiers corps, due to their flirtatious yet creepy and perverted behaviour, such as catcalling against girls (especially doctors, pharmacists, midwives, and nurses), both online and offline.
- IQ 78, IQ jongkok, and IQ gorila 'stupid people' (from a pseudoscientific paper by Richard Lynn which says that Indonesians only have an IQ level of 78, similar to that of apes)
- jamet (from jablay/janda mètal 'women who dresses and acts overly provocative but didn't care about their appearance and won't bother to take care about themselves', jajal metal 'metal poseur', or Jawa metal 'metalhead Javanese'; a pejorative name for Javanese people)
- Jawir 'from the words Jawa and ireng (literally 'black' in javanese)' used by non-Javanese people to mock Javanese people.
- jendela mikocok 'a pejorative name for Microsoft Windows' (from English windows)
- kadrun (from kadal gurun lit. 'desert lizard'; a pejorative name for Islamic bigot).
- Kaum rebahan 'a pejorative name for the type of person who prefers to relax at home rather than going out; antisocial'
- kecot 'yapping'
- kode nuklir 'a pejorative term for dangerous dorkings, like a serial keys, etc.'
- Konoha (short for Konohagakure, the name of a fictional village in the Naruto series; a pejorative name for Indonesia used by Malaysians)
- kringe 'a pejorative term that aims to describe in the word a sense of discomfort caused by another person’s behavior' (from English cringe)
- kuproy 'construction worker' (from kuli proyek 'construction worker'; sometimes pejorative)
- kutu kupret 'bastard'
- mabuk estetik 'drunk on alcohol, but still in control—outfit still on point and still artsy'
- Malaydesh (from 'Malaysia but Bangladesh-flavored’; a pejorative term for Malaysia's current cultural condition; (Note: In particular, the rapid growth of migrant workers from Bangladesh to Malaysia especially in big cities like Kuala Lumpur.) the real meaning Malaydesh is "The Land of Malay" in Sanskrit or Bengali)
- mangki 'stupid people' (from English monkey)
- Mikocok 'a pejorative name for Microsoft Corporation'
- mokondo (an abbreviation from modal kontol doang "done just by penis", a pejorative name for a men that less than ideal in terms of intellectuality, skills, manners, and economical, a useless and cancerous men)
- mulustrasi 'a pejorative term used to give a good and relevant illustration related to the topic'
- ndakik-ndakik 'words or terminologies that too hard to understand, to the point it sounds nonsensical or gibberish.
- ngeri-ngeri sedap 'a mix of fear, or sheer terror with feelings of enjoyment'
- ngondek 'sissy, effeminate' (from kondektur 'public bus attendant'; describing the manner of fast speaking on announcing the destinations while doing waving gesture done by bus attendant, popularized by LGBT community)
- nyawit 'being opportunistic ally' (from nyari duwit lit. 'search money')
- nyenyenye 'yapping'
- orang had 'a pejorative term for someone who, in the past, possessed extraordinary wealth, was very well-off, or lived a prosperous life (a play on the word "had")'
- orang have 'a pejorative term for someone who is extraordinarily wealthy, very well-off, or prosperous (a play on the word "have")'
- oten 'a pejorative name for Christian bigot' (from orang Kristen)
- pansos 'an individual who attempts to gain social prominence through the use of obsequious behavior' (from Pemanjat sosial 'social climber')
- PTPT or petepete 'womanizer' (from pacarin, tidurin, putusin, tinggalin 'a guy who dates a girl, has sex with her, breaks up with her, and then abandons her')
- Purel 'a pejorative name for a person within a company or organization—in the context of the nightlife industry—who serves as a public relations or discussion partner between the company or organization and the public or external parties; this person is capable of handling a wide range of responsibilities, including business matters, and also intimate activities' (from English Public Relations)
- RT 6 or RT 06 (from rukun tetangga; used by Indonesian Christian apologists to describe Islam, with warga RT 6 or warga RT 06 is used to describe Muslims in general)
- RT 16 (used as a counter by Muslim apologists to describe Christianity, and similarly, warga RT 16 is used to describe Christians in general)
- saham gocap (literally fifty share) 'a pejorative term for stocks with a very low price range, which means that these stocks are very cheap, unpopular, illiquid, and often have poor fundamental performance' which refers to the prior June 2023 lowest price limit of trade-able shares.
- saham gorengan 'A pejorative term for stocks whose daily trading volume and value are unusual, abnormal, or out of the ordinary'
- slebew 'sleeping well (after sexual intercourse)'
- stolking 'sneaking up on social media'
- Termul or Ternak Mulyono (lit. 'Livestock of Mulyono'; a pejorative name for supporters of Joko Widodo and his family, Mulyono being Jokowi's birth name)
- terong-terongan (from térong 'eggplant'; the male counterpart of cabé-cabéan, refer to the similarity of an elongated-shaped purple eggplant with a penis. Thus the term térong dicabéin (lit. 'chilied eggplant') means male to female cross-dresser)
- tiko (from tikus kotor, lit. 'dirty rat'), a slur by Indonesian Chinese for non-Chinese ethnicities in general.
- TikTod or TikoTok 'a pejorative name for TikTok'
- uclim 'a pejorative name for Muslim bigot' (from umat Muslim)
- Vrindavan or Prindapan (from Vrindavan, the location mentioned in Little Krishna animated series; a pejorative name for India)
- Wakanda (originally the name of a fictional country in Marvel Comics, a pejorative name for Indonesia)
- warga +62 or its online form netizen +62 (from warga (citizen) or Netizen and +62, Indonesia's telephone country code; a pejorative name for Indonesian)
- yabai 'a pejorative term for NSFW' (from Japanese: やばい (yabai) 'terrible')

== Particles ==
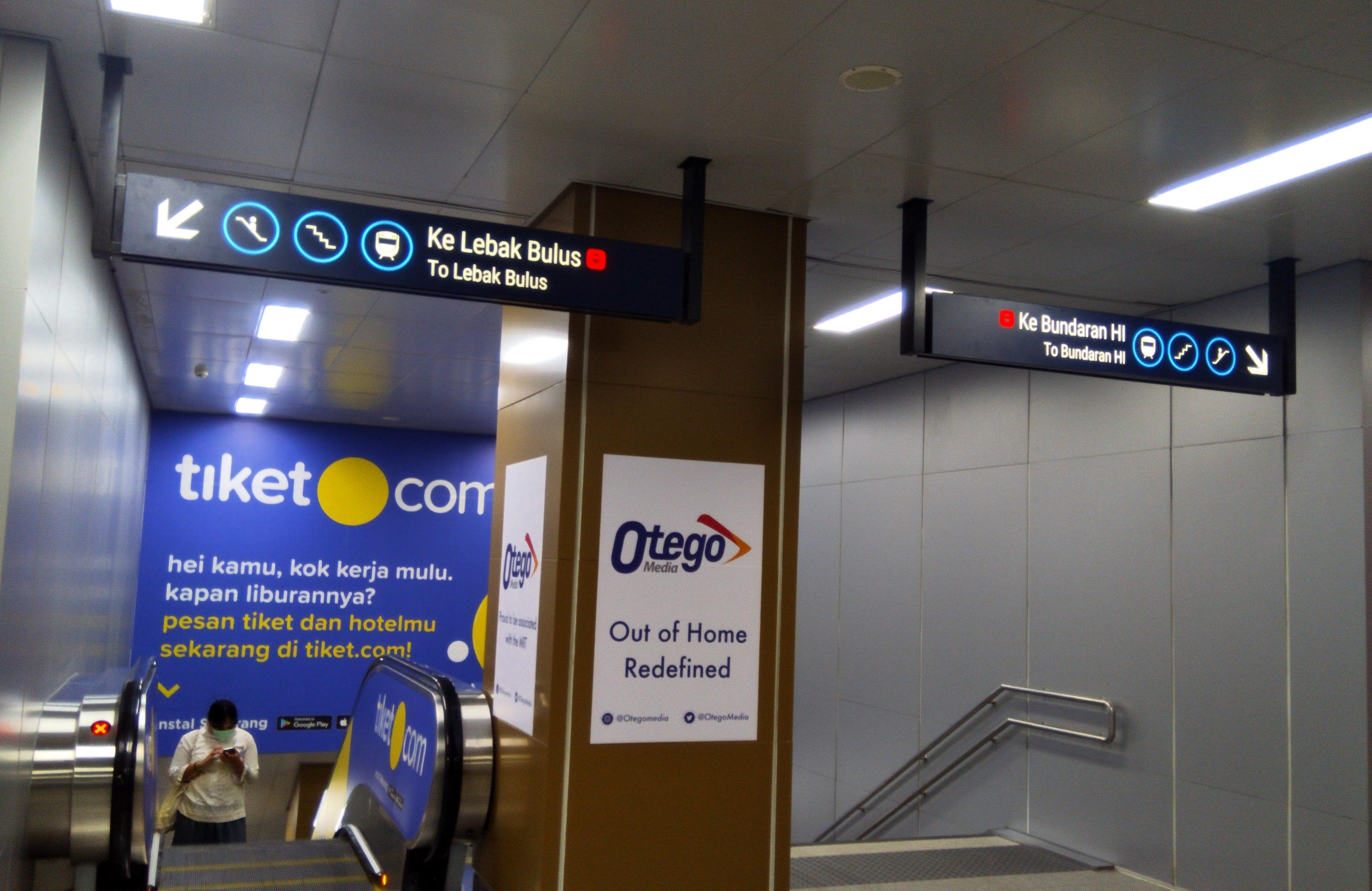
An advertisement in Jakarta with the particle kok.

Many slang modal particles are used in the end of a sentence. Usually, these particles do not directly change the sentence's meaning, in the sense that the truth conditions remain the same. However, they can have other effects, such as emphasizing a sentence or suggesting hesitancy. They can be used to reinforce the social link between speaker and listener.

For example, the sentence Dia datang (she/he comes) could be modified by one of the following particles:

- Dia datang nih - used as exclamation.
- Dia datang dong - expresses certainty (She comes for sure), or sometimes obviousness (usually cheekily); dong can be stressed with a long vowel to mean She has to come.
- Dia datang kok - used to convince someone who might doubt the sentence.
- Dia datang lah - expresses a high level of certainty.
- Dia datang lho - could be translated as She comes, you know.
- Dia datang ah - expresses hesitancy; could be translated as I think she/he comes.
- Dia datang dooong - expresses hesitancy; could be translated as I wish she'd come or Please let her come
- Dia datang deng - used to correct what was wrong; could be translated as She came apparently
- Dia datang deh - used to emphasize that 'finally' the person is coming, or in different intonation and context, it is used to emphasize a condition for proposing a request, for instance in a context of: 'She will come too, so please also come with us'
- Dia datang, lagi or Dia datang pula - expresses annoyance, exasperation, or general displeasure; could be translated as She/he comes, too?

Particles can also be used to introduce questions. The following examples could both be translated as How could she come?:

- Kok, dia datang? - used when the speaker finds the sentence difficult to believe.
- Lho? Dia datang - indicates surprise or disbelief.

== Vocabulary evolution ==
=== Pre-1980s ===
Kumpul kebo literally means 'water buffalo-style gathering' or 'gather like cattle'. It originated during the Dutch colonial era and was known as koempoel gebouw, from koempoel 'to gather' and Dutch gebouw 'building', thus the phrase means to live together under the same roof (as an unmarried couple). Confusion has caused this term to be linked with Javanese kebo 'buffalo'. This term basically means that two people in a relationship are living together without being married, i.e. in a domestic partnership or a de facto relationship. To kumpul kebo in Indonesia is considered immoral and sometimes illicit. For these reasons and also those relating to religion, Asian culture, and general ethics, it is often frowned upon in modern Indonesian society to do such a thing.

=== 1980s ===
The 1980s was the era of bahasa prokem. At this time slang language vocabulary was formed by the insertion of the infix -ok-, creating a totally new word. Prokem itself is a prokem word from préman.

Prokem words created by reducing the ultima, then inserting the infix -ok- before the vocal of the penult (which is now become the ultima). If the penult is an open syllable, the penult taking the nearest consonant after it as its coda. If the word is monosyllabic, the infix simply inserted before the vocal. Examples are given below, with the vocal of the penult marked with bold and the nearest consonant marked with underscore:

- ba-pak → bap → bokap 'father'
- ju-al → jul → jokul 'to sell'
- sen-di-ri → sen-dir → sendokir

The word sekolah 'school' was transformed into skokul, from skul, reminiscent of the English word "school". This word slowly become outdated and by the 1990s the word was no longer used, and changed to sekul or simply skul.

Other notable words such as mémblé 'ugly, frowning', kecé 'beautiful, good looking' (from keren cekali 'very cool'), the sentence attribute nih yé, and the exclamation "alamakjan!" all emerged in the same decade.

=== New Millennium ===
Much of the slang language created post-2000 originated from the Indonesian LGBT community. The latest method for transforming a word is to take a totally different word which differs in its ultima, rime, or coda. For example, the word mau 'want' is replaced with the word mawar 'rose'. Despite its creativity and originality, this latest form of Indonesian slang can be quite complicated to understand, even to the native Indonesians themselves. For example, "Akika tinta mawar macarena" originates from the sentence written in proper Indonesian "Aku tidak mau makan", which means 'I don't want to eat'.

The abbreviations often used to mask insult, such as kamseupay 'totally lame', abbreviation of kampungan sekali udik payah which means 'really bumpkinish, yokel, lame'.

== Region specific slang ==
=== Medan slang ===
Medan is the capital of North Sumatra Province. Most of the slang from Medan are heavily influenced by the Malay, Hokkien, and Karo languages. For example, bapa for 'father', nande for 'mother', kedé for 'shop', tutup lampu for 'turn off the light', buka radio for 'turn on the radio'. Another example of Medan slang is by adding punya at the end of the sentence. For example, mobil aku punya for 'my car'. They also have the tendency to confuse between e /ə/ and é /e/, partially due to the fact that most of nearby Batak languages lack the former vowel, the schwa.

=== Jambi and Palembang slang ===
Jambi and Palembang slang mostly involves changing the letter at the end of the word with letter 'o'. However, not all words can be modified to include the characteristic 'o', as this rule applies mostly to words ending with the letter 'a'. Sometimes Palembang use shorter-version of word by erase first syllables, like 'segala' in standard Malay-Indonesian to 'galo'.

- Ado - ada (there is)
- Kito - kita (we)
- Galo - segala (all, every)
- Ngapo - kenapa (why or what happened)
- Jugo - juga (too)

Another characteristic pattern of Jambi and Palembang slang involves the addition or replacement of the final letter of a word with 'k'.

- Pulak - pula (too, also, as well)
- Aek - air (water)

Another classic Malay Sumatran dialect also prevailed in most of Sumatran cities, from Palembang to Bengkulu, Jambi, and Pekanbaru. These classical Malay words such as nian is used in Sumatran cities instead of sangat or banget (very).

- Nian - nian (classical Malay) - sangat (standard Indonesian) - banget (Indonesian slang)

=== Jakarta slang ===
Jakarta including Bodetabek is the capital city of Indonesia with a population of more than 20 million people. Consequently, such a huge population with a more diverse ethnicity, socioeconomic background, and different nationalities will undoubtedly have a role in the Jakarta slang evolution. And being the biggest media production nationwide such as national TV broadcasts, film productions, social media contents, etc, Jakarta slang has influenced the rest of Indonesia's regional slang. Either directly or indirectly with varying adaptations. Much of the slang evolved from the Betawi dialect, that itself, absorbs some regional or foreign dialects as a result of past interactions.

Some prominent examples:

- Ajé (from 'saja') - only, just, from the Betawi dialect
- Ayé (from 'saya') - I, me; from Betawi
- Bacot - talk too much. Shortened from Javanese banyak cocot
- Bang (from 'abang') - a Malay dialect addressing older brother or a gentleman relatively the same age as the speaker.
- Banget - very, from the Betawi dialect
- Bégo (from 'bodoh') - stupid, from the Betawi dialect
- Berapa duit? or berapaan? - how much money/how much is the cost?
- Bo'il (with a glottal stop between 'o' and 'i') - car
- Bokap - father
- Bonyok - mother and father combined, also a slang which means a bruise.
- Busèt - A form of expression which is similar to "Oh My God" or "Alas" or "Holy shit!"
- Cabé - chili pepper (cabai)
- Cakep - nice
- Capek - tired (lelah)
- Doang (from 'saja')- which means only, that's all
- Émangnya kenapa? - So what?/What does it matter?
- Gan/Agan - Boss, from Sundanese Juragan
- Gendut or Gembrot - Fat
- Gilé! (from 'gila')- An exclamation meaning crazy/insane/obscene, as emphasis to a sentence or phrase.
- Gombal - Crazy or, as another term, flirtatious words
- Gua/Gué/Gw - I, Me; Originally from Hokkien 我, through Betawi
- Guga/Uga - Juga, (also)
- Jayus (from 'jail, usil') - Ignorant and nosy.
- Kebon - garden (kebun)
- Kondangan - Invitation (undangan), usually a wedding invitation
- Lu/Lo/Lw - You; Originally from Hokkien 你, through Betawi
- Manyun - Someone with protruding lips, or pouting (usually used to describe when someone is upset).
- Mécing - Fitting; From English word matching.
- Ngaret - be late
- Ngenlay - Kangen, although "kangen" is slang for rindu. (miss)
- Nyengnyong - Nyanyi, (singing)
- Nggak/gak/ga - not
- Nyokap - mother
- Nyolot - haughty, arrogant
- Pengen - Want (ingin)
- Sinting - Insane, a freak person.
- Yo'i - Yes, very cool.

The following words are taken from Hokkien (Fujian) Chinese, and commonly used in transactions.

- Cepek - IDR 100
- Gopek - IDR 500
- Seceng - IDR 1000
- Cenggo - IDR 1500
- Goceng - IDR 5000
- Ceban - IDR 10.000
- Goban/Gocap - IDR 50.000
- Pego - IDR 150.000

However, many Indonesians of non-Chinese descent do not know the meaning of the transaction words above, likely in association with the exception of Goceng due to its usage on KFC Indonesia's advertising on their "Goceng" products, in which all "Goceng" menus are sold at the IDR 5000 price range. Sometimes the word "perak", literally "silver", is used to describe small denominations of currency.

==== Landmarks ====
This slang term is an abbreviation to facilitate communication.

Some prominent examples:

- Ambas – Ambassador Mall
- Benhil – Bendungan Hilir
- Blok M – Kebayoran Baru Trade Area
- Bonjer – Kebon Jeruk
- Bundaran HI – Selamat Datang Monument
- Buperta – Bumi Perkemahan & Graha Wisata Pramuka Cibubur
- Cibujang – Cibubur Junction
- CP - Central Park Mall
- Detos – Depok Town Square
- Dufan – Dunia Fantasi Taman Impian Jaya Ancol
- Gancit – Gandaria City Mall
- Gatsu – Gatot Subroto Avenue
- GI – Grand Indonesia Mall
- Kalcit – Kalibata City Superblock, Pancoran, Jakarta
- Kasablanka – Kampung Sawah Belakang Karet, Tebet, Jakarta
- Keong Mas – Taman Mini Indonesia Indah
- Kokas – Kota Kasablanka Mall
- Kota Tua – Old City of Batavia (Fatahillah)
- Kotwis – Kota Wisata Cibubur
- Kuncit – Kuningan City Mall
- Legwis – Legenda Wisata Cibubur
- M2S or emduas – Mangga Dua Square
- MKG - Mall Kelapa Gading
- MOI – Mall of Indonesia
- Monas – Monumen Nasional
- Pasplas/PP – Pacific Place Mall
- Patung Pancoran – Patung Dirgantara Monument, Pancoran, Jakarta
- Penvil – The Park Pejaten (formerly known as Pejaten Village)
- PGC or pegece – Pusat Grosir Cililitan
- PIK – Pantai Indah Kapuk
- Sency – Senayan City Mall
- Soetta – Soekarno–Hatta International Airport
- TA – Taman Anggrek Mall

==== South Jakarta slang ====
This slang is a code mixing between Indonesian and English. It is named after South Jakarta. Some iconic English words used in this slang include I, You / U, which is, like, literally, sometimes, basically, and some Indonesian words + -ly exp (jujurly). Code mixing with English does not only occur in Jakarta, but also in other major cities in Indonesia.

Negative sentiments on this slang caused this given the name "fart language" (Indonesian: bahasa kentut) by some.

==== Poetic form ====
Some of these slang terms have also evolved into karmina (a traditional poetic form consisting of exactly two lines). The first line functions as the hook (sampiran), and the second line delivers the actual message.

These expressions often take the form of casual comments; a common example in society is sori gak lepel, used to express a polite refusal due to a difference level in social status. As examples:

stroberi, mangga, apel ('strawberry, manggo, apple')
sori gak lepel ('I'm sorry, we're different level')

Another example is ya YTTA, used to refer to something not known to everyone and kept secret from the public, and so on. As examples:

stroberi, mangga, pepaya ('strawberry, manggo, papaya')
ya YTTA ('Well, it’s just for people who know it only')

=== Sundanese slang ===
In the West Java and Banten region, the main place for Sundanese speakers, there are several words or phrases belonging to the slang language. This diversity of slang has its own peculiarities in each region in West Java Province.

==== Bandung slang ====
Bandung is the capital city of West Java province with a predominantly Sundanese culture. The Sundanese language has three levels or forms, namely: high (polite), middle class, and low (impolite). Bandung slang often uses the Low Sundanese pronouns along with the many other Sundanese translations of popular Indonesian.

Some examples:

- Uing (from kuring) - I/me
- Didieu (from di dieu, actually mean 'here') - I/me
- Didinya (from di dinya, actually mean 'there') - You
- Euy - Sundanese particle in the end of the sentence to express excitement and surprise
- Da - Sundanese particle in the end of the sentence to express certainty and emphasizes the meaning, somehow similar to Japanese "desu".
- Sok - meaning 'pleasure'
- O'on (from Bolo'on) or Oneng (from the name of a slow witted character in Sinetron Bajaj Bajuri) - stupid, dim witted
- Belegug - stupid
- Aslina - (from word asli 'real', plus a suffix -na) which is mean 'for real'.
- Anying - (from word anjing, but change 'j' to 'y') which is mean 'fuck'
- Jangar - headache
- Stoppan - meaning transportation stop in 'traffic light'
- Aliran - meaning 'power outage'
- Kantong - meaning 'bag'

==== Bogor slang ====
Bogor is a city in the province of West Java with the former Kingdom of Sunda Padjajaran, Bogor slang is Sundanese with its influence from Indonesian and Betawi, sometimes uses Sundanese with the word pronounced backwards.

==== Sukabumi slang ====
Sukabumi slang the language is a non-standard variety of Sundanese language that is often used in Sukabumi, West Java in the Tipar area, because Widal itself means Tipar.

This Sani or Widal language can also be called slang or slang in the Sundanese dialect, where the pronunciation of the letters in the consonants changes.

For example, the letter G becomes S, J becomes C, and 'ng' becomes 'ny' and so on.

=== Javanese slang ===
These slangs are shared across Central Java and Yogyakarta where Javanese is predominantly spoken. Like Sundanese which are spoken in Bandung, Javanese also has 3 different set of vocabularies, based on the politeness level. Common people usually talk with a mix between low-Javanese, middle-Javanese, and Indonesian. Some non-Javanese residents added their own dialects to the pot, resulting what is called the Central Java slang

==== Yogyakarta slang ====
Yogyakarta slang is also known as Basa Walikan, literally means 'Reverse Language'.

It is a transformation of Javanese, in which Javanese consonants in Javanese script are switched with one another, as shown below

Line	Standard Javanese					Basa Walikan				
1	ꦲ ha	ꦤ na	ꦕ ca	ꦫ ra	ꦏ ka	ꦥ pa	ꦝ dha	ꦗ ja	ꦪ ya	ꦚ ña
2	ꦢ da	ꦠ ta	ꦱ sa	ꦮ wa	ꦭ la	ꦩ ma	ꦒ ga	ꦧ ba	ꦛ tha	ꦔ ṅa
3	ꦥ pa	ꦝ dha	ꦗ ja	ꦪ ya	ꦚ ña	ꦲ ha	ꦤ na	ꦕ ca	ꦫ ra	ꦏ ka
4	ꦩ ma	ꦒ ga	ꦧ ba	ꦛ tha	ꦔ ṅa	ꦢ da	ꦠ ta	ꦱ sa	ꦮ wa	ꦭ la

With the above rules, the expletive expression Matamu! (which literally means: 'Your Eyes!') becomes Dagadu! (also the name of a clothing brand). The following website automatically performs this transformation: Walikan Translator

==== Malang slang ====
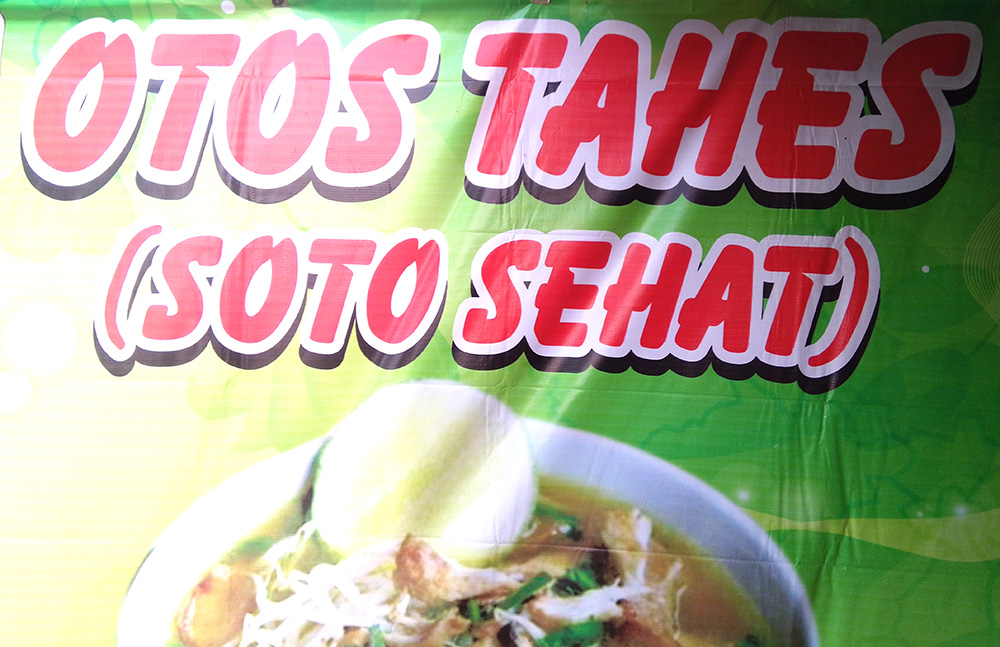
A ribbon which reads Otos tahes, which means healthy soto in Walikan Malang language.

Malang slang is inverted alphabetical word (mostly from Javanese and little bit from Indonesian). Commonly known in Javanese as Boso Walikan Malang (Reversed: Osob Kiwalan Ngalam. Meaning: Malang's Reversed language). The slang started appearing sometime in 1949 when the people at Malang's Gerilya Rakyat Kota (GRK, meaning City People's Guerilla) needed a form of communication method that is unknown to the occupying Dutch intelligence (Both to the Dutchman, and the recruited natives) while maintaining typical daily conversation. Thus, the idea to reverse Javanese and Indonesian words was born. The goal of the creation of the language is to maintain plan secrecy, prevent leakage of information, and to confuse the enemy. At First, the language was only known amongst the guerillas. Further adding the language's purpose as an identifier whether that person is a friend or foe. But after the Dutch retreated from the city, the language remained and becoming more widespread amongst the people of Malang and its surroundings.

In the present days, the technique of reversing words has become more popular nationwide and played a role in creating modern Indonesian slang. Words such as Ngab (From: Abang meaning 'Older Brother'), Sabi (From: Bisa meaning 'Be able to..' or 'Can') or Kuy (From: Yuk meaning 'Let's go') owes credit to Malang's Walikan Language.

Sentence structure of Walikan Malang language is similar to those of Javanese and Indonesian language. Albeit reversing some of its vocabularies. However, not all Javanese and Indonesian words or phrases can be directly reversed into Walikan Malang Language.

Example:

Question: "kalau kerja bakti bahasa walikannya apa 'idrek ikteb' mas? (Is the word for "kerja bakti" (community service) be reversed to "idrek ikteb" sir?)

Answer: Walikan Malang:"...Idrek bakti (menurut ayas), kadit amoes kata osi di kiwal/dibuat osob kiwalan, mba."

Javanese:"...Idrek bakti (menurut saya), ora semua kata iso di walik / dibuat boso walikan, mba."

Indonesian:"...Idrek bakti (menurut saya), tidak semua kata bisa di balik / dibuat bahasa Walikan, bu."

English:"...Idrek bakti (to me), not every words can be reversed / made into Walikan Language, ma'am."

Word Example

Wordlist
Malang Walikan	Standard Javanese	Indonesian	English Translation	Note
Sam	Mas		Older brother	Javanese version of 'Abang' or 'Bang'
Ongis Nade	Singo Edan		the nickname of Arema Cronus F.C.	
Helum	Muleh		to go home	
Ublem	Mlebu		to enter	
Utem	Metu		to exit	
Ojob	Bojo		spouse	
Oges	Sego		rice	
Rajajowas	Sawojajar		Sawojajar	an area in Malang
Oyoborus	Suroboyo		Surabaya	Javanese Latin spelling in eye spelling
Ngalam	Malang		Malang	
Kera Ngalam	Arek Malang		the people of Malang	literally the kid of Malang
Libom	Mobil		Car	
Nawak Ewed	Kawan Dewe		Your own Friend/s	
Silup	*	Polisi	Police	Although the Javanese word for police is the same as in Indonesian, Polisi. The word altered slightly as pulis to make it less obvious and better spoken
Landas	Sandal		Sandal	
Ayas		Saya	first person pronoun	
Koen*	Kowe		second person pronoun	

More Vocabulary can be found in the following post.

==== Surabaya slang ====
As the second largest city in Indonesia and the capital of East Java, Surabaya uses a rougher dialect of Javanese and has a fairly complete list of its own slang. Javanese language originated from the Central Javanese farmland and by the time it reached the coastal area of East Java, it changed from its original polite form into a more impolite version with the creation or further adaptation of many new 'Javanese-style' words and swearwords. One of the most notable Surabaya slang is the word Jancok.

=== Pontianak slang ===
Pontianak slang is influenced by Malay, Teochew and Dayak and sometimes combined with Hakka. It is spoken in the Malay dialect. These slang varieties are spoken throughout West Kalimantan.

=== Makassar slang ===
Makassar slang is highly influenced by the native Makassarese language and sometimes combined with Chinese accents. The slang, in the end, sounds more informal and 'rude', as going with the tough image of Makassarese people. The possessive word for you (kamu) has three degrees of politeness: -ta (very formal and respectful), -mu (neutral), and -nu (informal). For example:

- This book belongs to you → Buku ini punya-ta (the - reads as a glottal stop, which makes it punya'ta. In Makassarese dialect, the apostrophe is sometimes added in written form). Buku ini punya'mu is deemed more neutral, while Buku ini punya'nu is only spoken with very close friends.

Meanwhile, the word for you itself is divided into two, the formal ki and the informal ko.

- 'Di mana maki' (Where are you now) as opposed to informal 'Di mana moko'. The -ma and -mo derives from the -mi which is often added in the end of words, having various meanings. It is hard to determine when to use mi or not, except to learn it by heart.

Ini mi? -> 'This one?' Biarkan mi -> 'Let it go' Ko sudah belajar mi? -> 'Have you studied?'. Ko derives from the informal Indonesian word Kau, which stands for 'you'. Sudah dimulaimi itu ulangan? -> 'Has the exam started?', literally, 'Has-been started-the exam?'

Ji is also often used in the end of words. Most often, it means 'only', or used to give a more assuring tone to a sentence.

- Sedikit ji -> 'It's only a little'
- Tidak apa-apa ji -> 'It's okay'
- Tidak susah ji soalnya -> 'The problem isn't difficult.'

Di functions more like a question tag, read with a glottal stop at the end, which makes it to be 'dik'

- Tidak susah ji di?? -> It's not difficult, right?

Aside from that, Makassarese more often speak with a heavier accent, mixing many of the Indonesian words with native Makassar words.

- Tena ku issengi apa maksudnya (or even more complicated Tena ku issengi apa massu'na ) -> Literally, "No I understand what its meaning", actually meaning, "I don't understand what it means". In places, Makassarese slangs add -i at the end of words, putting a glottal stop before that. Furthermore, the words tend to be shortened considerably, which makes -nya read as -na and words ending with -d or -t gets its ending replaced with glottal stops. Menyusut (shrinking) becomes menyusuk, and vice versa. Native Makassar people usually reads becak (pedicab) as becat.

=== Ampenan slang ===
A local variety of Malay known as Ampenan Malay, also known as Colloquial Indonesian or Indonesian slang for the people of the old town of Ampenan in the city of Mataram, West Nusa Tenggara. It is heavily influenced by loanwords from other languages, especially Sasak, besides Arabic and Chinese, and also through Javanese, Balinese, and Buginese. The sentence structure is based on Malay grammar, as are most of the basic words, but there are many loan words from other languages.

== Gallery ==
The booklet JANGAN NGUTIP DARI WIKIPEDIA! using a content with slang terms on it.

== See also ==
- Language families and languages
- Demographics of Indonesia
- British slang
- Cant (language)
- Patois
- Argot
- Slang
- Language game
- List of diglossic regions
- Cantonese internet slang, the similar phonemon of Indonesian slang.
- Alay
- Bahasa Rojak
