= Alay =

Indonesian pop culture phenomenon

Alay (or 4L4Y, Anak Layangan, Anak Jablay or Anak Lebay, Indonesian pronunciation: [ˈalaj]) is an Indonesian pop culture phenomenon. The term refers to a stereotype describing something "tacky" (norak), "cheesy" (kampungan) and/or being excessive. The Alay culture phenomena spans a wide array of styles in music, dress, and messaging. It has often been compared to the Jejemon phenomenon originating from the Philippines and Harajuku in Japan. Although the former emerged much later, the latter was even admired in the West.

== Etymology ==
The word "Alay" has no exact meaning or obvious derivation. Various definitions of alay are offered. One theory that is widely accepted is that "Alay" comes from the term "Anak Layangan" (Indonesian: Kiteflyer), a pejorative describing someone having certain attributes from spending most of their time outside and getting sunburnt (e.g. reddened hair and skin). Kites are also considered as cheap entertainment to the middle and lower classes in modern Indonesia, stereotyping alay as a part of that class.

== Characteristics ==
=== Writing style ===
Alay text (Indonesian: Tulisan alay) is a form of the Indonesian language that has undergone "excessive leet transformation". Contrary to the popular belief that it is "destroying" the national language, grammatical standards are met in contrast to the modern Indonesian slang language. Similar to the jejebets, alay texts offer an alternative in compressing words so that they are under the 160-character limit in text messages, often to the point that they are impossible to read. Rules in capitalization are mostly ignored.

Alay text may have originated from the method of making strong passwords for internet accounts, which requires combinations of small and capital letters, numbers, as well as special characters. Normally, to keep the password meaningful and easy to remember, the password would consist of normal words, where some letters are capitalized or substituted with numbers (e.g. the letter a with 4, the letter o with 0). Soon, this becomes a habit in writing text in general, and is improved with mixing English and Indonesian in one sentence.

Confusing text that could not be understood properly and probably has no meaning (except for the writer), is also considered as Alay Text. This type of text usually contains information about the writer's mood and feelings. It is also common for the text to contain the writer's own philosophy on certain topics such as love, heartbreak, and relationships.

According to The Jakarta Post, a high school student from East Java initiated the trend and became famous after her writings were discussed in forums and blogs, not because they were great, but because they were in "code". Her approach to writing attracted much attention, with some people reproducing her writings in forums and blogs.

== See also ==
- Indonesian slang
- Jejemon
- Ah Beng
- Leet
