= Tokkie =

Dutch pejorative for lower-class people

The epithet tokkie is used in the Netherlands as a pejorative noun for lower-class people who often are seen as likely to engage in anti-social behaviour, similar to the English chav, the Scottish ned, the South African zef and the Australian eshay.

The term is derived from the surname Tokkie and came into general use when the Dutch family Tokkie (who bear some resemblance to the fictional Flodder family from the eponymous Dutch comedy film of the 1980s and 90s) gained notoriety when they were portrayed on national television in 2004 and 2005. Of this family only the mother (Hanna Tokkie) actually bears the surname Tokkie. The other family members were the Ruijmgaarts (after the father, Gerrie Ruijmgaart) even though everyone was collectively identified as a "tokkie".

The word has been included in the authoritative Van Dale dictionary.

“Father Tokkie” Gerrie Ruijmgaart died in April 2026 at the age of 76.
