= Cañí =

Cañí is a Spanish adjective, which refers to the Romani people. La España cañí is a set phrase that refers to folkloric Spain and is sometimes used derogatorily, although not referring specifically to Romani people but to Spanish popular culture at large.

While its precise meaning and nuance are complex and can be debated among Spanish people, it is typically used (endearingly or somewhat pejoratively) to describe something (e.g., music, situations, or objects) that conveys an overly folkloric or stereotypical aspect of Spanish culture, sometimes to a humorous extent.

Cañí is the origin of the song name España cañí, meaning Gypsy Spain, a Spanish pasodoble often played at bullfights, and also known as the Spanish Gypsy Dance.
