= Skeet (Newfoundland) =

Pejorative epithet in Newfoundland English

The noun skeet in Newfoundland and Labrador English is considered to be a pejorative epithet. Though it has never been formally defined in the Dictionary of Newfoundland English, it is used as a stereotype to describe someone who is ignorant, aggressive, and unruly, with a pattern of vernacular use of English, drug and alcohol use, and who is involved in petty crime. "Skeet" is very similar to the word "chav" used in the UK.

From this noun, the adjective "skeety" is derived.

== History ==
The origin of this use of skeet is unknown. However, it is possible that it is a new use of an old word, coming out of the use of skeet as 'rascal'. There have been some who theorize that the use of the word skeet is linked to the townie versus bayman divide in Newfoundland and Labrador and how it speaks to class, education, and use of vernacular Newfoundland English.

== Use as pejorative ==
Skeet has been called a pan-provincial slur against rural life. It is linked to stereotypes of those living in outport communities: the use of vernacular Newfoundland English, living in economically poor areas, and to lower levels of education. Though vernacular use of English is on the decline in Newfoundland and Labrador, those that continue to speak using non-standard forms of English are often stereotyped as uneducated fishermen from Newfoundland outports.

Skeets are characterised as rough around the edges, unintelligent, poorly dressed, and poorly spoken. However, of equal importance is the skeets' connection to petty crime, and drug and alcohol use. Skeet stereotype is linked to those living in economically poor areas and lower levels of education. The stigma of being from a lower income area, or dropping out of school is associated with being a skeet, and it is unlikely that an educated or professional person would be associated with the term unless it was used in jest.

Phillip Hiscock, associate professor of folklore at Memorial University of Newfoundland has said that using the word skeet says more about the person using it than the person being referred to. He also claims it is more a reflection of modern post-capitalism culture than a true identity.

This use of skeet is virtually unknown outside of the province, though people displaying the same characteristics may be referred to as white trash or trailer trash in some areas of Canada and the United States, chav in the United Kingdom, spide in Northern Ireland, or skanger in Ireland. Sandra Clarke suggests there could be a connection between skeet and Prince Edward Island's skite.

== Pop culture ==
Bands like Gazeebow Unit, a hip-hop group from Airport Heights, St. John's, Newfoundland and Labrador, play on some of the stereotypes of skeet, incorporating it into their music and parody the skeet stereotype.

Some local Newfoundland and Labrador companies have begun to use the word on some of their products.

Depictions of "skeet" characters in entertainment have included the television series Little Dog, and the theatrical feature films How to Be Deadly and Skeet.

== See also ==
- Gazeebow Unit, a Newfoundland rap group with skeet cultural references
- Ned (Scottish)
- Chav (United Kingdom)
