= Jejemon =

Filipino pop culture phenomenon

Jejemon (Tagalog pronunciation: [ˈdʒɛdʒɛmɔ̝n]) was a popular culture phenomenon in the Philippines. The Philippine Daily Inquirer describes Jejemons as a "new breed of hipster who have developed not only their own language and written text but also their own subculture and fashion."

== Origins ==
This style of shorthand typing arose through the short messaging service, in which each text message sent by a cellphone is limited to 160 characters, evident in popular phone models in the early 2000s such as the Nokia 5110. As a result, an "SMS language" developed in which words were shortened in order to fit the 160-character limit. However, some jejemons are not really "conserving" characters; instead, they are lengthening their message. On April 14, 2010, on a Filipino Tumblr page, a post about vice presidential candidate Jejomar Binay indicated that Binay was the Jejemon's preferred vice presidential candidate, complete with a fake poster with him called "Makki Autors". Later the use of word jejemon to refer to such people made rounds in various Filipino internet message boards.

The word Jejemon is a portmanteau of the Japanese animated series Pokémon and jeje as an expression of laughter.

Such short-handed language is not limited to Filipinos: Thais use "5555" to denote "hahahaha," since the number 5 in Thai language is pronounced as "ha."

== Demographics ==
The Jejemons are said to be the new jologs, a term used for Filipinos of the lower income class. The parameters of being classified as a Jejemon are still unclear, and how the different "levels" of "Jejemonism" are reached, although there are named levels such as "mild," "moderate" and "severe" or "terminal."

== Language ==
The sociolect of the Jejemons, called Jejenese, is derived from English, Filipino and their code-switched variant, Taglish. It has its own, albeit unofficial, orthography, known as Jejebet, which uses the Filipino variant of the Roman alphabet, Arabic numerals and other special characters. Words are created by rearranging letters in a word, alternating capitalization, over-usage of the letters H, X or Z. Superfluous as well as the presence of silent letters characterize its spelling convention. It has similarities with Leetspeak, primarily the alphanumeric nature of its writing.

== Reaction ==
Several Facebook fan pages were created both in support and against the group. Celebrities such as Alessandra de Rossi, Ces Drilon, and Lourd de Veyra have condemned the wholesale ridicule of the subculture. Due to the sudden existence of jejemons, 'Jejebusters' were created, a group of internet grammar vigilantes, typically Filipinos, dedicating their internet lives towards the eradication of jejetyping and jejemon existence.

YouTube videos were also uploaded parodying the Jejemons, connecting them to the 2010 election campaign. Edited television advertisements of Nacionalista Party proclaiming their disdain, and an edited photograph of Gilberto Teodoro with him holding a sign saying that the Jejemons should be "brought back to elementary school" went viral. In 2010, the Filipino GMA Network broadcast the situational comedy JejeMom, headlined by Eugene Domingo. In the same year, the late comedian Dolphy starred and produced the film Father Jejemon.

As part of the pre-school year clean-up of schools for the upcoming 2010–11 school year, the Department of Education (DepEd) strongly discourages students from using Jejemon spelling and grammar, especially in text messaging. Communicating with others using Jejemon "language" is said to cause deterioration of young Filipino students’ language skills.

== Decline and a change of definition ==
From early 2013 onwards, with the rise of smartphones, which began to overtake feature phones in terms of sales in the country, the phenomenon appeared to gradually decline in mainstream popularity. Some social media accounts continue to use such spellings to this day, although mostly for sarcasm. The term "jejemon" gradually shifted in meaning to a pejorative used to describe a stereotype of poorly educated young people wearing hip-hop clothing, roughly similar to the British slang term chav for people associated with sportswear culture and later overlapping with local hypebeast trends. In the 2020s, Jejemons have also been referred to as "genggeng," often identified by their black shirts, brown pants or joggers, and other gangsta hip-hop themed clothing.

== See also ==
- Studly caps
