= Andrea Freund =

Chilean actress

- Born: Andrea Michelle Marie Freund; January 18, 1969 (age 57); Santiago de Chile
- Education: University of Chile
- Occupation: Actress
- Children: 2

Andrea Michelle Marie Freund (Santiago, January 18, 1969) is a Chilean stage, film, and television actress and also a theater director and producer.

== Biography ==
She attended the Alliance Française School in Santiago. She entered the Escuela Teatro Imagen, directed by Gustavo Meza, graduating in 1993.

She began her stage career in the early 1990s and made her television debut in the telenovela Champaña on Canal 13, rising to fame for her role as the murdered woman in the drama. Since then, she has acted in a number of telenovelas, including Top Secret, El amor está de moda, Marrón Glacé, el regreso and Fuera de control, among others.

His breakthrough came in 2000, acting in the telenovela Romané, where her character "Charito", a teacher, falls in love with her gypsy student called "Mirko" (Pablo Schwarz), directed by acclaimed director Vicente Sabatini. She also starred in the first horror film in Chile, Ángel Negro, by Jorge Olguín.

In the mid-2000s, she only appeared in Mega miniseries, including a starring role in Mitú. Later, she debuted as a theater producer alongside her ex-husband, actor and screenwriter Mateo Iribarren.

In 2003, she produced the play La condición humana (The Human Condition), winning her first Altazor Award. In 2011, her starring role in 03:34: Earthquake in Chile garnered critical acclaim, earning her an Altazor Award nomination in 2012.

Later, she joined the cast of the acclaimed Chilean Amazon Prime series La jauría.

Freund's last television appearances were Dime con quién andas (2023) and El día menos pensado (2024) in Chilevisión.

== Personal life ==
She was married to Mateo Iribarren (2001–2015), currently divorced, and with whom she had a son, Jack Iribarren. She also has a daughter from a previous relationship, called Amalia Stuardo.

== Filmography ==
=== Films ===
Year	Title	Character	Director
1997	Sin miedo a la muerte	Mónica	Ricardo Harrington
1997	Dardos de amor en el tablón	Ágatha	Pedro Morales
1998	Pájaro de mal agüero	Yanela	Rodrigo Terreros
2000	Ángel Negro	Carolina	Jorge Olguín
2008	Secretos	Antonia	Valeria Sarmiento
2010	Anónimo		Renato Pérez
2011	03:34: Earthquake in Chile	Alicia	Juan Pablo Ternicier
2013	El tío	Isabel Lineros	Mateo Iribarren
2018	El despertar de Camila	Madre de Camila	Rosario Jiménez-Gili

=== Television ===
==== Telenovelas ====
Year	Title	Character	Notes
1994	Champaña	Sara Oyarzún	Protagonista; 92 episodios
1994	Top secret	Macarena Mena	Elenco principal
1995	El amor está de moda	Catalina Andrade	Elenco principal
1996	Marrón glacé, el regreso	Silvana Werner	Elenco principal
1997	Eclípse de luna	Claudia Riva	Elenco principal
1998	Amándote	Soledad Etcheverry	Elenco principal
1999	Fuera de control	Isadora Worth	Elenco principal
2000	Romané	Rosario Gaete	Elenco principal
2001	Piel canela	Victoria Mayo	Elenco principal
2004	Don floro	Susana	Elenco principal
2004	Es cool	Beatriz Orrego	Elenco principal
2005	Mitú	Lucía Armazán / Laura Castaño	Protagonista: 90 episodios
2011	Decibel 110	Cecilia Ripamonti	¿? episodios
2012	Maldita	Teresa Risopatrón	¿? episodios
2013	Socias	Estela Amenábar	¿? episodios
2016	Veinteañero a los 40	Teresa Valdés	¿? episodios
2017	La Colombiana	Bernarda Van Dorse	¿? episodios
2023	Dime con quién andas	Josefina Achondo	¿? episodios
2025	Aguas de oro	Gabriela	¿? episodios

==== TV Series ====
Year	Title	Character	Notes
2001	La otra cara del espejo	Bárbara	
2003	Cuentos de mujeres	Guillermina	Protagonista. Episodio: Guillermina
2004	BKN	Carla Zambrano	4 episodios
2006	Casado con hijos	Rebeca	Episodio: Las tallas de Lucho
200	El día menos pensado	Beatriz/Ana/Natalia	Protagonista: 4 episodios
2007	Amango	Sonia Cruz	
2010	Infieles	Cristina	Episodio: Bienvenida Carla
2014	Fabulosas Flores	Carmen Eguiguren	
2015-2018	Lo que callamos las mujeres	Sandra/Sabina/Cristina	Protagonista: 6 episodios
2017	Vidas en riesgo	Fabiola	Protagonista: Episodio: Fabiola
2017	Grandes pillos	Nivia Pita	Episodio: Rafael Garay
2018	Ramona	Patricia García	Elenco principal
2020	La jauría	Madre de Luz	Episodio: Gente con dinero
2024	El Día Menos Pensado	Ivette	Protagonista. Episodio: Mil veces maldita

== Theatre ==
- Salvar a los delfines, dirección: Hugo Müller, 1994.
- Las Morlas, dirección: Elsa Poblete, 1999.
- Victor Jara la ventana que busca la luz, dirección: Mateo Iribarren, 2000.
- La Ratonera, dirección: Alejandra Gutiérrez, 2001.
- Pareja Abierta, dirección: Alejandro Goic, 2002.
- Náufragos, dirección: Cristian Quezada, 2002.
- La condición humana, dirección: Mateo Iribarren, 2007.
- El taller de los celos, dirección: Mateo Iribarren, 2008.
- El hombre vertical, dirección: Mateo Iribarren, 2009.
- El coordinador, dirección: Alejandro Goic, 2010.
- Feas, ¿Quién quiere ser Gloria Münchmeyer?, dirección: Mateo Iribarren, 2010.
- Guzmán, dirección: Mateo Iribarren, 2011.
- Ruleta Rusa, dirección: Mateo Iribarren, 2012.
- Acerca de mí, 2014.
- Amantes, dirección: Lorena Faúndez 2016.
