= 2010 Chile earthquake =

Megathrust earthquake off the coast of central Chile

2010 Chile earthquake and tsunami
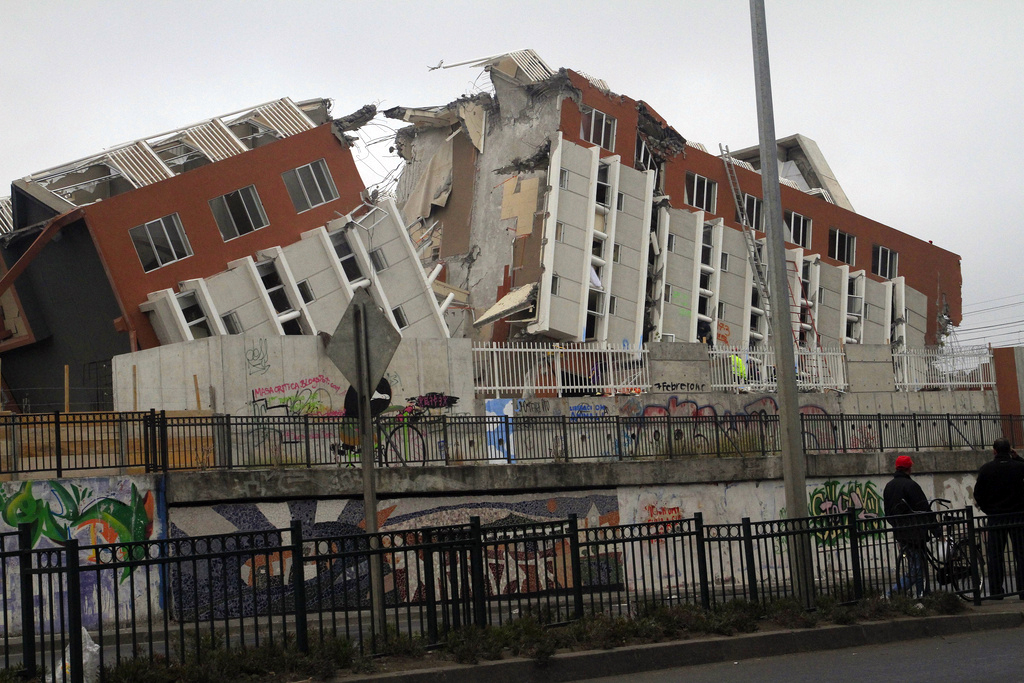
- Damage sustained by a building in Concepción, located around 100 kilometres south of the epicenter.

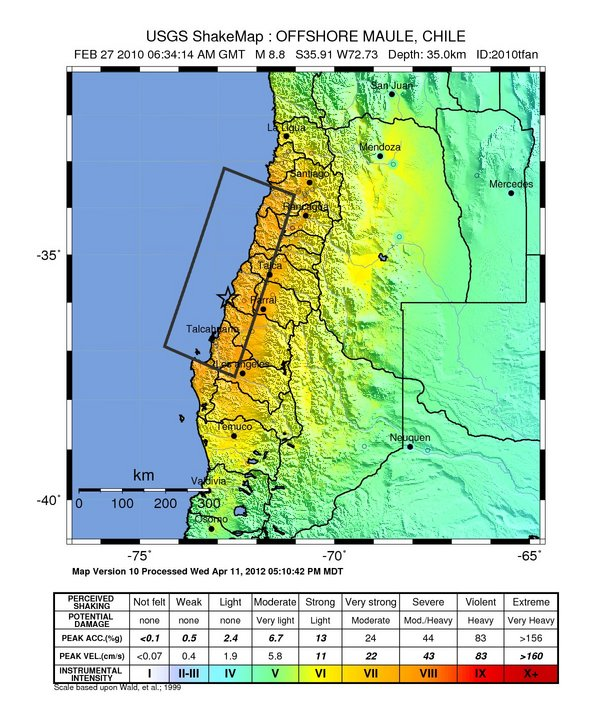
- USGS ShakeMap of the earthquake
- UTC time: 2010-02-27 06:34:12
- ISC event: 14340585
- USGS-ANSS: ComCat
- Local date: 27 February 2010
- Local time: 03:34:12 CST (UTC-03:00)
- Duration: 3 minutes
- Magnitude: 8.8 M_{ww}
- Depth: 35 km (22 mi) 30.1 km (19 mi)
- Epicenter: 35.909°S 72.733°W; 36.290°S 73.239°W
- Type: Megathrust
- Areas affected: Chile
- Max. intensity: MMI IX (Violent)
- Peak acceleration: 1.09 g
- Peak velocity: 116,03 cm/s
- Tsunami: 24.1 m (79 ft)
- Casualties: 525 dead, 25 missing

On 27 February 2010 at 03:34 UTC−03:00, a M_{ww} 8.8 megathrust earthquake struck off the coast of the Maule Region of central Chile. One of the most powerful earthquakes ever recorded, it lasted approximately three minutes and was felt across six Chilean regions, home to roughly 80 percent of the country's population. The earthquake, which became known in Chile as the 27F earthquake (Spanish: Terremoto del 27F), was the largest to hit the country since the magnitude 9.5 1960 Valdivia earthquake and the strongest worldwide since the 2004 Indian Ocean earthquake.

The earthquake triggered a tsunami with wave heights reaching up to 24.1 m (79 ft) that devastated several coastal towns in south-central Chile, causing the most severe damage at Constitución. Tsunami warnings were issued across 53 countries, and waves caused damage as far away as California and Japan. The disaster resulted in 525 confirmed deaths and 25 missing persons, left approximately 370,000 homes damaged, and generated a nationwide blackout affecting 93 percent of the Chilean population. Economic losses were estimated at US$15–30 billion. President Michelle Bachelet declared a state of catastrophe and deployed the military to the worst-affected areas.

== Location/epicenter ==
According to the USGS, the epicenter of the earthquake was about 3 km (1.9 miles) off the coast of Pelluhue, a town in the Maule Region. This is about 6 km (3.7 miles) west of the village of Chovellén, 15 km (9.3 miles) southwest of the town of Pelluhue and at a point approximately 100 km (62 miles) away from the following four provincial capitals: Talca (to the north-east), Linares (to the east), Chillán (to the south-east) and Concepción (to the south). Chile's Seismological Service located the quake's epicenter at about 34 km (21 miles) off the coast of Ñuble Region in the Biobío Region. This is 60 km (37 miles) north of Concepción and 170 km (110 miles) south-west of Talca.

== Seismology and geology ==
The earthquake took place along the boundary between the Nazca and South American tectonic plates at a location where they converge at a rate of 80 millimetres (3.1 in) a year. This earthquake was characterized by a thrust-faulting focal mechanism, caused by the subduction of the Nazca plate beneath the South American Tectonic Plates. The end-regions of the rupture zone coincided with the Andean oroclines of Maipo (33° S) and Arauco (37° S). This has been interpreted as suggesting a link between upper plate (South American plate) structure and rupture length.

Chile has been at a convergent plate boundary that generates megathrust earthquakes since the Paleozoic era (500 million years ago). In historical times the Chilean coast has suffered many megathrust earthquakes along this plate boundary, including the strongest earthquake ever measured, the 1960 Valdivia earthquake. More recently, the boundary ruptured during the 2007 Tocopilla earthquake in northern Chile.

The segment of the fault zone which ruptured in this earthquake was estimated to be over 700 km (430 mi) long with a displacement of almost 10 meters, or 120 years of accumulated plate movement. It lay immediately north of the 1,000 km (620 mi) segment which ruptured in the great earthquake of 1960. Preliminary measurements show that the entire South American plate moved abruptly westward during the quake. A research collaborative of Ohio State and other institutions have found, using GPS, that the earthquake shifted Santiago 28 cm (11 in) to the west-southwest and moved Concepción at least 3 metres (10 ft) to the west. The earthquake also shifted other parts of South America from the Falkland Islands to Fortaleza, Brazil. For example, it moved Argentina's capital of Buenos Aires about 2.5 cm (0.98 in) to the west. Several cities south of Cobquecura were also raised by up to 3 meters. The maximum recorded peak ground acceleration was at Concepcion, with a value of 0.65 g (6.38 m/s^{2}).

The locality of Tirúa south of Concepción recorded a 180 cm (71 in) uplift relative to sea level as a result of the earthquake. This is the highest known uplift of the coast resulting from the earthquake. This uplift made a large islet emerge at the mouth of Lebu River.

=== Compared with past earthquakes ===
This was the strongest earthquake affecting Chile since the magnitude 9.5 1960 Valdivia earthquake (the most energetic earthquake ever measured), and it was the strongest earthquake worldwide since the 2004 Indian Ocean earthquake and until the 2011 Tōhoku earthquake. It is tied with the 1906 Ecuador–Colombia and 2025 Kamchatka earthquakes as the sixth strongest earthquake ever measured, approximately 500 times more powerful than the 7.0 M_{w} earthquake in Haiti one month prior in January 2010.

=== Aftershocks ===
An aftershock of 6.2 was recorded 20 minutes after the initial quake. Two more aftershocks of magnitudes 5.4 and 5.6 followed within an hour of the initial quake. The USGS said that "a large vigorous aftershock sequence can be expected from this earthquake". By 6 March UTC, more than 130 aftershocks had been registered, including thirteen above magnitude 6.0.

Shortly after the mainshock seismologists installed a dense network of seismometers along the whole rupture area. This network captured 20,000 aftershocks in the 6 months after the mainshock and shows a detailed picture of the structure of the Chilean margin. Seismicity is focused in the depth range of 25–35 km (16–22 mi) and in a deeper band of between 45 and 50 km (28 and 31 mi) depth. Around 10,000 aftershocks occurred in the region of two large aftershocks in the Pichilemu region.

A 6.9-magnitude offshore earthquake struck approximately 300 kilometers southwest of, and less than 90 minutes after, the initial shock; however, it is not clear if that quake was related to the main shock. A separate earthquake of magnitude 6.3 occurred in Salta, Argentina, at 15:45 UTC on 27 February, at a depth of 38.2 km (23.7 mi); two people were injured and one died in Salta. This earthquake was followed on 1 March at 06:32 UTC by a magnitude 4.9 aftershock. Four other earthquakes above M5.0, some possible aftershocks, also occurred near the border in Argentina following the Chile earthquake; a magnitude 5.0 earthquake occurred in Mendoza on 28 February, a M5.3 earthquake in Neuquen and a M5.2 in San Juan on 2 March, and a M5.1 quake in Mendoza on 4 March.

Another strong earthquake occurred on 4 March, at 22:39 UTC in Antofagasta in northern Chile, with a magnitude of 6.3.

Minor quakes generated by the main one could be felt as far away as São Paulo, Brazil, located about 3,000 km (1,900 mi) away from Concepción. Since the major earthquake, and as of 15 March, at least four to forty >M5.0 earthquakes have been recorded daily in the vicinity of the main earthquake, including four above magnitude 6.0 between 3 and 6 March.

On 5 March, two aftershocks above M6.0 were reported. The first was a 6.3-magnitude off the coast of the Biobío Region. The second was near the epicenter of the original quake at 08:47 local time with a magnitude of 6.6.

On 11 March, the March 2010 Chile earthquake (magnitude 6.9, treated by some as an aftershock of the February 2010 earthquake) was reported, followed quickly by further aftershocks measuring 6.7 and 6.0. The epicenter of the 6.9 quake was in Pichilemu, O'Higgins Region.

On 15 March, two aftershocks of the February 2010 earthquake were reported, one at magnitude 6.2 at 08:08:28 local time offshore Maule, and another at magnitude 6.7 with the epicenter located offshore the Biobío Region, near Cobquecura, at 23:21:58 local time. This tremor was followed by two minor aftershocks, one occurring 45 minutes later, measuring M5.5. No tsunami was reported and there were no tsunami warnings issued.

On 17 March, at 14:38:37 local time, an earthquake of magnitude 5.2 was recorded in Aisén, in Southern Chile. Another magnitude 5.2 earthquake was recorded in Los Lagos the next day. On 26 March, at 10:52:06 local time, a magnitude 6.2 earthquake hit the Atacama region, in Northern Chile.

The Biobio Region of Chile had strong aftershocks of this earthquake. The first one was a magnitude 6.7 M_{W} earthquake that struck off the coast of Biobío, Chile, at 23:21 on 15 March 2010 at the epicenter, at a depth of 18 kilometres (11 mi). The second earthquake struck on land in the region at 22:58 (UTC) on 2 April 2010 at 5.9 M_{W} and at a depth of 39 km (24 mi). The third struck on 10:03 (UTC) on 23 April 2010 at 6.2 M_{W}. The Pacific Tsunami Warning Center said that historical data indicates that this quake would not generate a tsunami but still advised of the possibility. On 3 May, at 19:09 a magnitude 6.4 M_{W} earthquake struck off Biobío, Chile, at the epicenter, at a depth of 20 km (12 mi). The epicenter was 55 km (34 mi) south of Lebu. On 14 July 2010, another 6.5 magnitude earthquake occurred in the area.

=== 2011 aftershocks ===
On 2 January at 17:20:18 local time, a 7.1 magnitude aftershock occurred 70 km (43 mi) northwest of Temuco, Chile. On Lautaro, Cañete, Nueva Imperial, Traiguén and Carahue the quake was felt at intensity VI (Strong) of the Mercalli intensity scale. In Temuco it was perceived at intensity V (Moderate). In Talcahuano, Concepción, Chillán, Osorno and Valdivia it shook at intensity IV (Light). According to the USGS the earthquake's epicenter was located on the ground, east of the coastal town of Tirúa in the Araucanía Region. However, according to the University of Chile's Seismological Service, the seismic event was located 134 km (83 mi) off the coast of Tirúa, measuring a magnitude 6.9 M_{L}. The University of Chile also reported that the localities that received the strongest shaking (VI) were Curanilahue, Lebu and Tirúa. In Concepción, Talcahuano and Temuco it was felt at intensity V, and in Chillán and Valdivia at intensity IV.

A magnitude 6.2 M_{w} aftershock struck the coast of Biobío, Chile at a shallow depth of 15.1 km (9.4 mi) on 1 June 2011 at 08:55 local time (12:55 UTC). It was centered just offshore Arauco Province near a moderately populated area, with most structures in its vicinity reported to be resistant to earthquake shaking. Strong shaking registering at VI on the Mercalli intensity scale was felt in Lebu, just 7 km (4.3 mi) south of the epicenter, lasting for approximately one minute. Some residents in coastal areas panicked and evacuated their homes. The earthquake was followed by a moderate magnitude 5.1 M_{w} tremor that occurred about 52 minutes later to the northeast of the main shock epicenter at an estimated depth of 26.9 km (16.7 mi). Initial estimates from the USGS placed its intensity at a magnitude of 6.4 M_{w}.

=== Geophysical impact ===
Seismologists estimate that the earthquake was so powerful that it may have shortened the length of the day by 1.26 microseconds and moved the Earth's figure axis by 2.7 milliarcseconds (about 8 cm). Precise GPS measurement indicated the telluric movement moved the entire city of Concepción 3.04 metres (10.0 ft) to the west. The capital Santiago experienced a displacement of almost 24 centimetres (9.4 in) west, and even Buenos Aires, about 1,350 kilometres (840 mi) from Concepción, shifted 4 centimetres (1.6 in). It is estimated that Chile's territory could have expanded 1.2 square kilometres (0.46 sq mi) as a result.

The earthquake also caused seiches to occur in Lake Pontchartrain to the north of New Orleans, United States, located nearly 7,500 kilometres (4,700 mi) from the epicenter of the quake. In Antarctica a series of icequakes were triggered by the 2010 earthquake in Chile.

== Damage and casualties ==
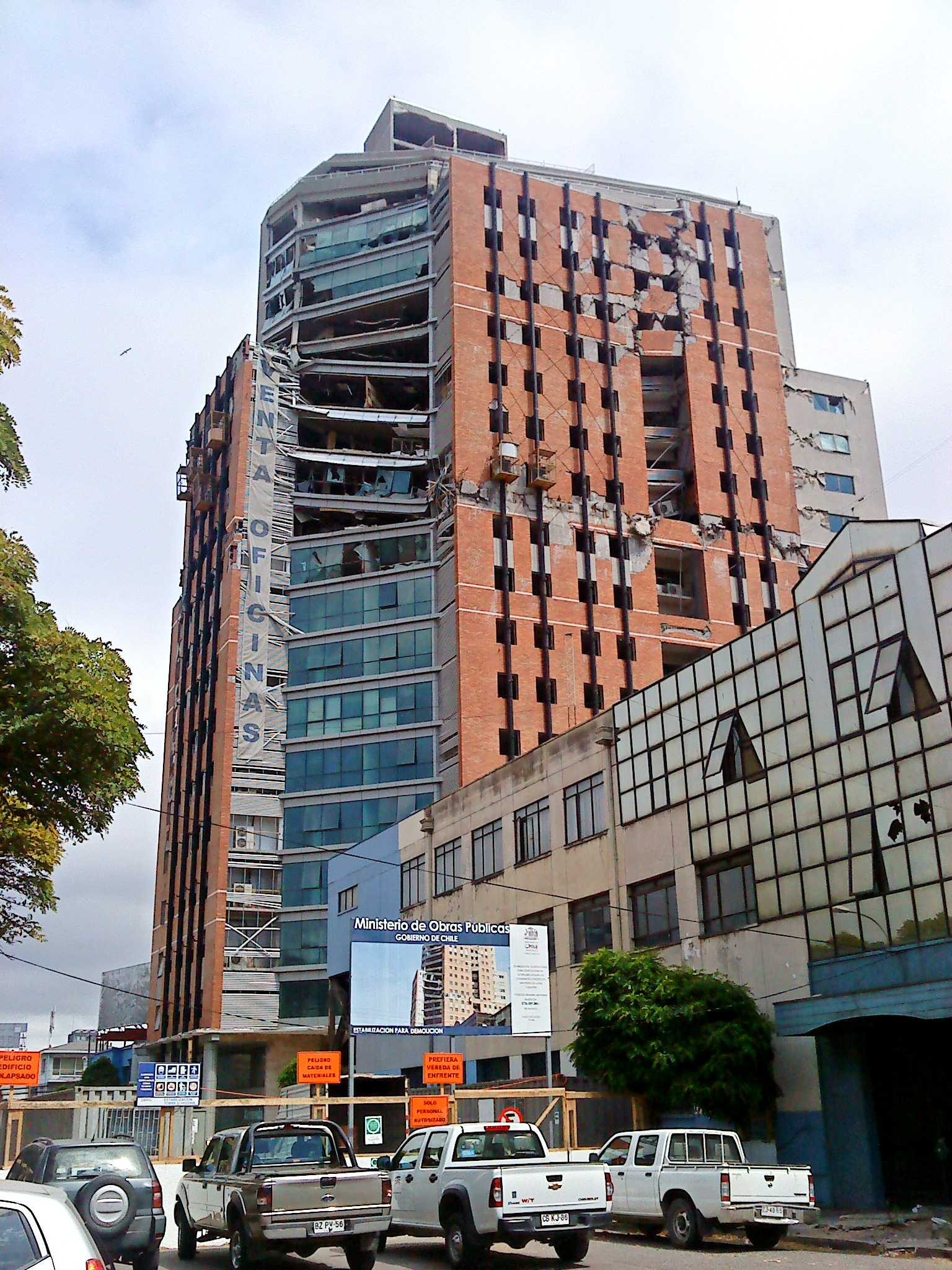
The partially collapsed 21-story O'Higgins Tower, Concepción

People were found dead after the earthquake struck, mostly under buildings and inside cars. Many people were also seriously injured. Most injuries were reported in Santiago and Maule.

According to an Associated Press Television News cameraman, some buildings collapsed in Santiago and there were power outages in parts of the city. A fire was reported in a chemical plant on the outskirts of Santiago and caused the evacuation of the neighborhood. Santiago's International Airport seemed to have been damaged and the airport authority closed off all flight operations for 24 hours from around 12:00 UTC. On Sunday, 28 February, Ricardo Ortega, head of the Chilean Air Force, said commercial airline services had been partially re-established and aircraft were being allowed to land in Santiago.

Santiago's national Fine Arts Museum was badly damaged and did not reopen until 9 March 2010. An apartment building's two-story parking lot collapsed, wrecking 68 cars. According to one health official, three hospitals in Santiago collapsed, and a dozen more south of the capital also suffered significant damage.

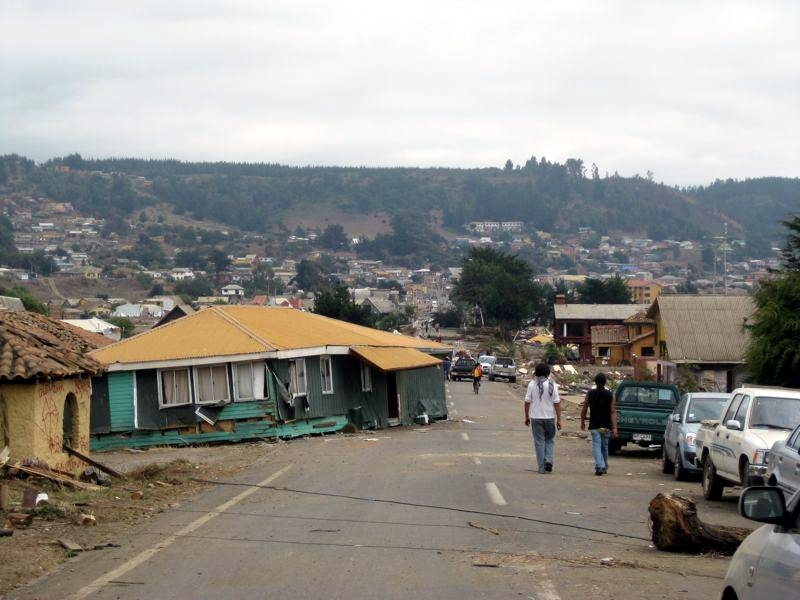
House thrown into the streets of Pelluhue after the tsunami

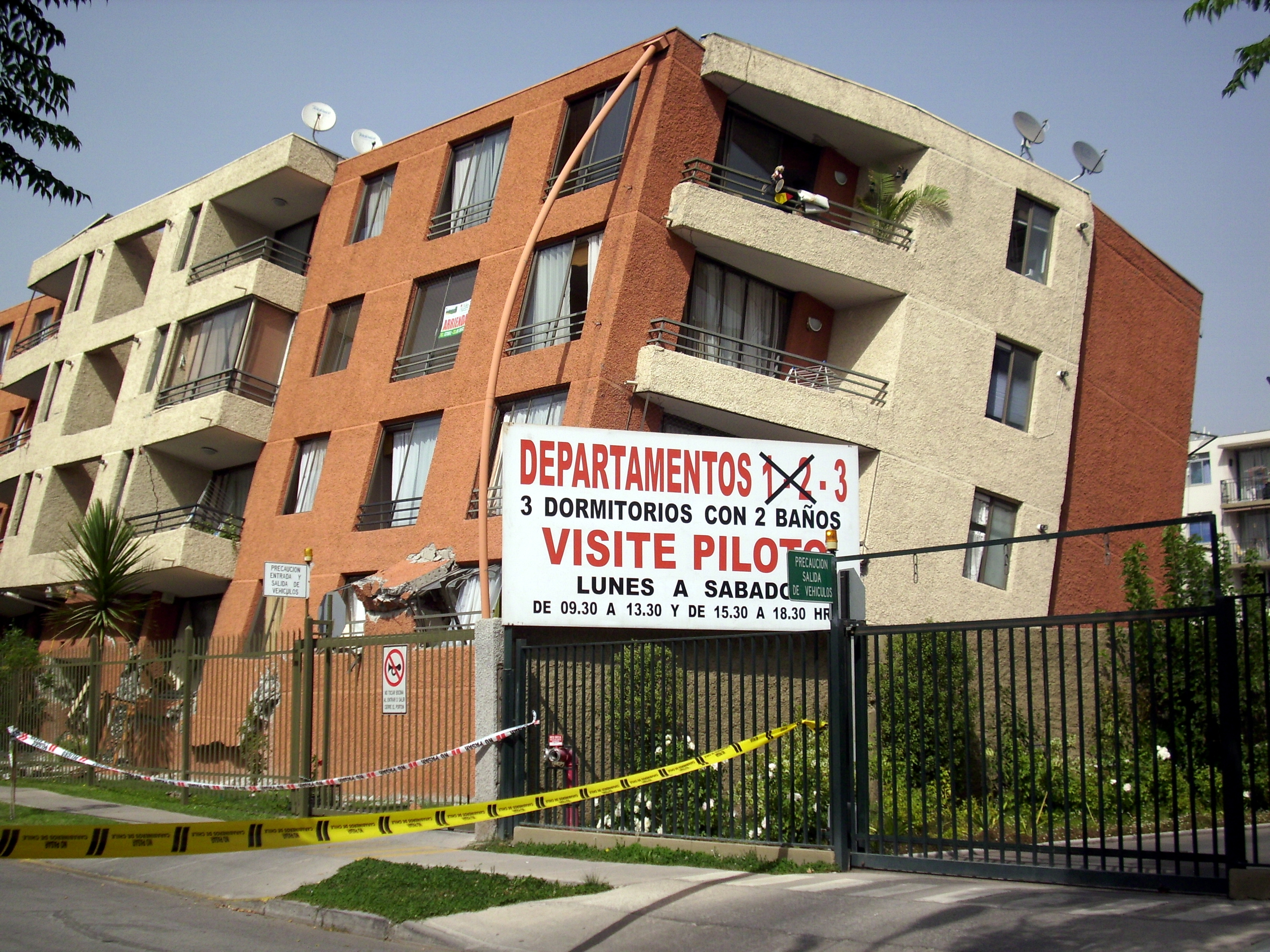
A severely damaged building in Maipú, Santiago

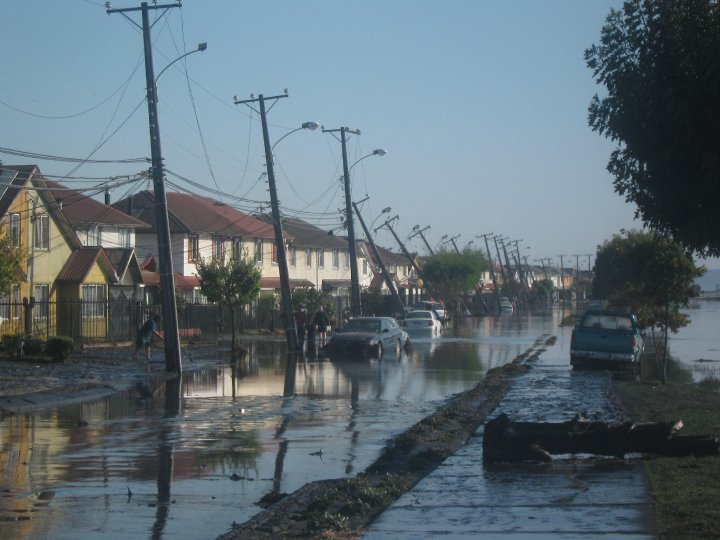
Tsunami in Talcahuano, Biobío Region

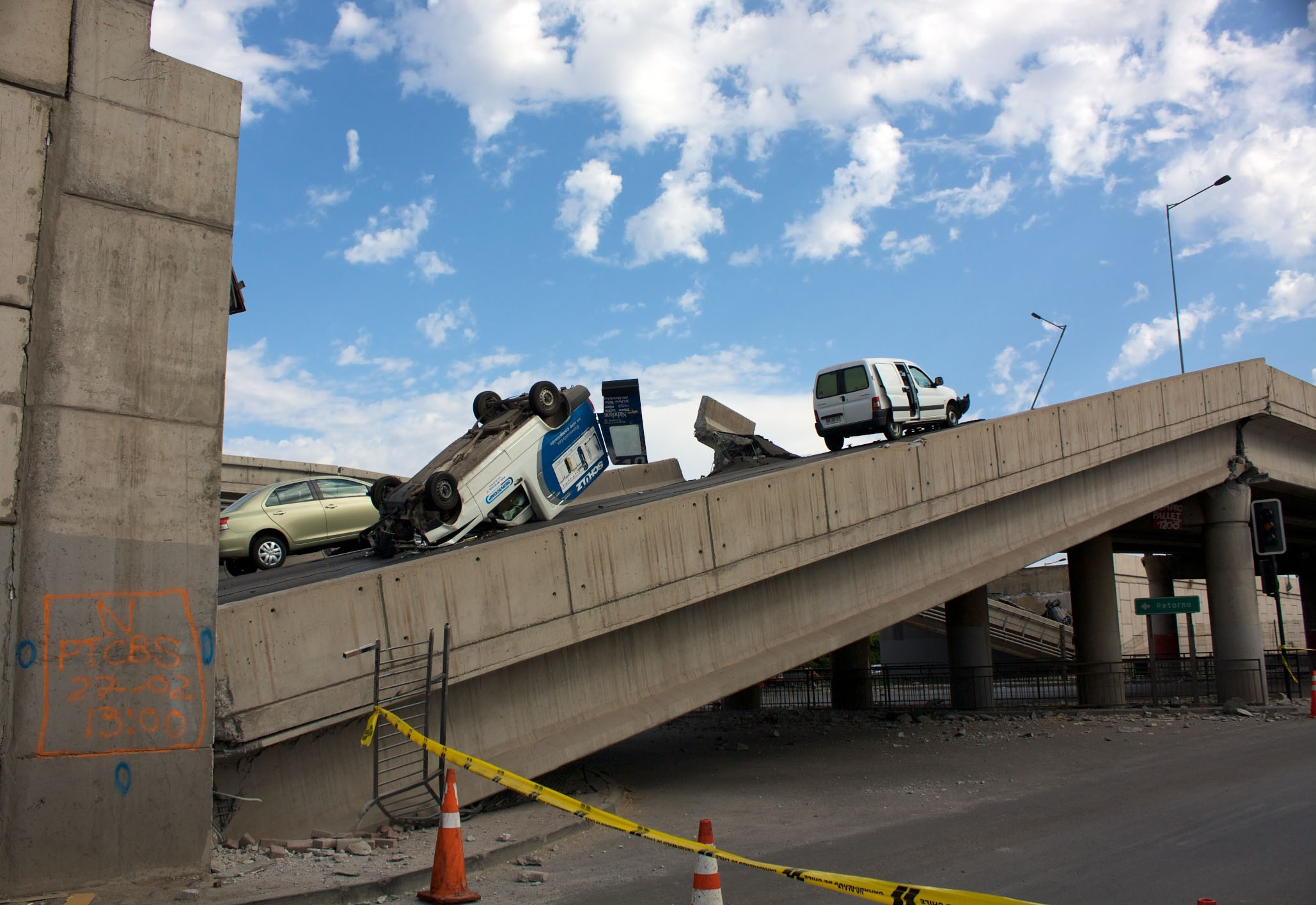
Collapsed Vespucio Norte Express Highway in Santiago

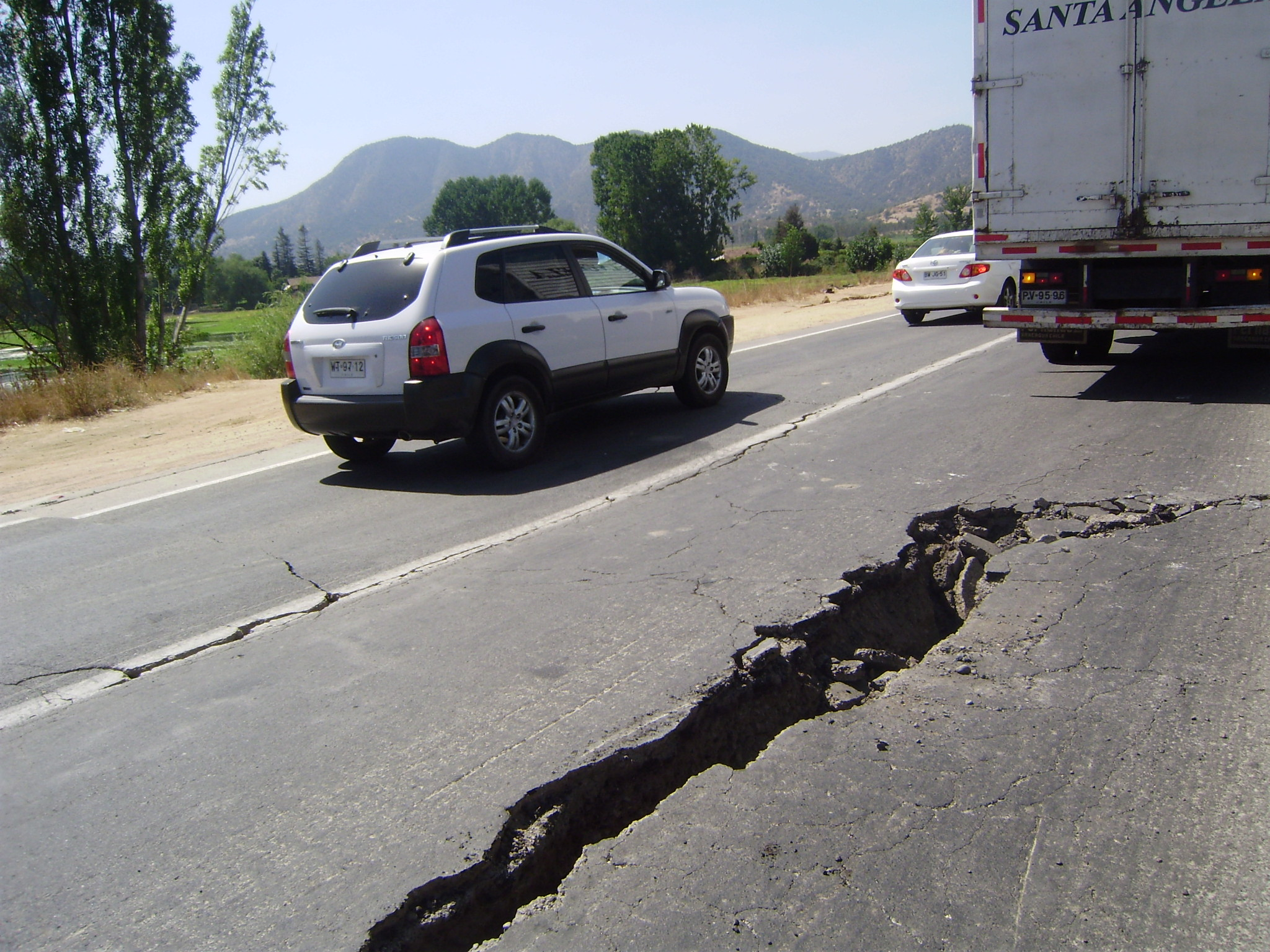
Fruit Road, O'Higgins Region

In Valparaíso, a tsunami wave of 1.29 m (4 ft 3 in) was reported. The port of Valparaíso was ordered to close due to the damage caused by the earthquake. The port started to resume limited operations on 28 February. In Viña del Mar, a touristic city and part of Greater Valparaíso, several buildings were structurally damaged, principally in the district Plan de Viña.

Many cities in the Maule region were seriously affected by the earthquake which triggered more than 1,000 landslides, a significant contributor to earthquake fatalities. Mapped from satellite images, most landslides occurring in the Principal Andean Cordillera and a constrained area on the Arauco Peninsula. Curanipe, only 8 km (5 mi) from the epicenter, was hit by a tsunami after the earthquake and still remained isolated from outside as of 28 February. A surfer said the tsunami "...was like the one in Thailand, a sudden rise of water. One could not estimate the dimension of the wave, because it was advancing foam. There were 10 to 15 rises, the last one being at 08:30 in the morning." In Talca, the capital of the Maule region, many dead were trapped in the rubble. The administrative building was uninhabitable, and the authorities had to be set up in the parade ground. All but two of the local hospital's thirteen wings were in ruins. Dr. Claudio Martínez was quoted as saying, "We're only keeping the people in danger of dying." Hospital staff attempted to transport some patients to Santiago on Sunday morning, but roads were blocked.

Damaged buildings and fires were reported in Concepción. Rescue teams had difficulty accessing Concepción because of the damaged infrastructure. The fifteen-story residential building "Alto Río" toppled, trapping many of the residents. As the building was newly completed, 19 of the apartments were occupied and 36 were of unknown occupancy. A 2.34 m (7 ft 8 in) tsunami wave hit Talcahuano, a port city and part of the Concepción conurbation. The tsunami caused serious damage to port facilities and lifted boats out of the water. In the fishing town of Dichato, of 7,000 residents, it was the third tsunami wave that ended up being the most damaging.

Dilapidated buildings could be seen on the streets of Temuco, about 400 km (250 mi) from the epicenter. The adobe of some buildings fell. Façades fell in pieces and crushed cars. Two people were reported dead because of not having been able to escape from a nightclub. On 27 February, it was reported that "finding an open business [was] almost impossible" ("Encontrar un negocio abierto es casi imposible"). Further south, in the city of Valdivia damage to houses were restricted to areas of poor soil quality, chiefly former wetlands and artificial fills. Some pavements near the rivershore in Valdivia cracked and collapsed much like in the 1960 earthquake. Overall there was little damage in Valdivia and this was highly localized. A survey showed that 434 persons in Valdivia had their homes damaged by the earthquake.

The earthquake also triggered more than 1,000 landslides mapped from satellite images with most landslides occurring in the Principal Andean Cordillera and a constrained area on the Arauco Peninsula Landslides are a significant contributor to earthquake fatalities. In Chile, 370,000 homes were damaged. The final death toll of 525 victims and 25 people missing was announced by authorities in January 2011. This is down from early reports on 3 March of 802 people dead.

The Chilean National Emergency Office (Oficina Nacional de Emergencia) estimated that the intensity of the earthquake was 9 on the Mercalli intensity scale in the Biobío Region and 8 in Santiago. USGS put the intensity in Talcahuano at MM VIII, in Santiago and Concepción at MM VII and in Valparaíso at MM VI.

On 10 March, Swiss Reinsurance Co. estimated that the Chilean quake would cost the insurance industry between 4 and 7 billion dollars. The same estimate was echoed by the rival German-based Munich Re AG.

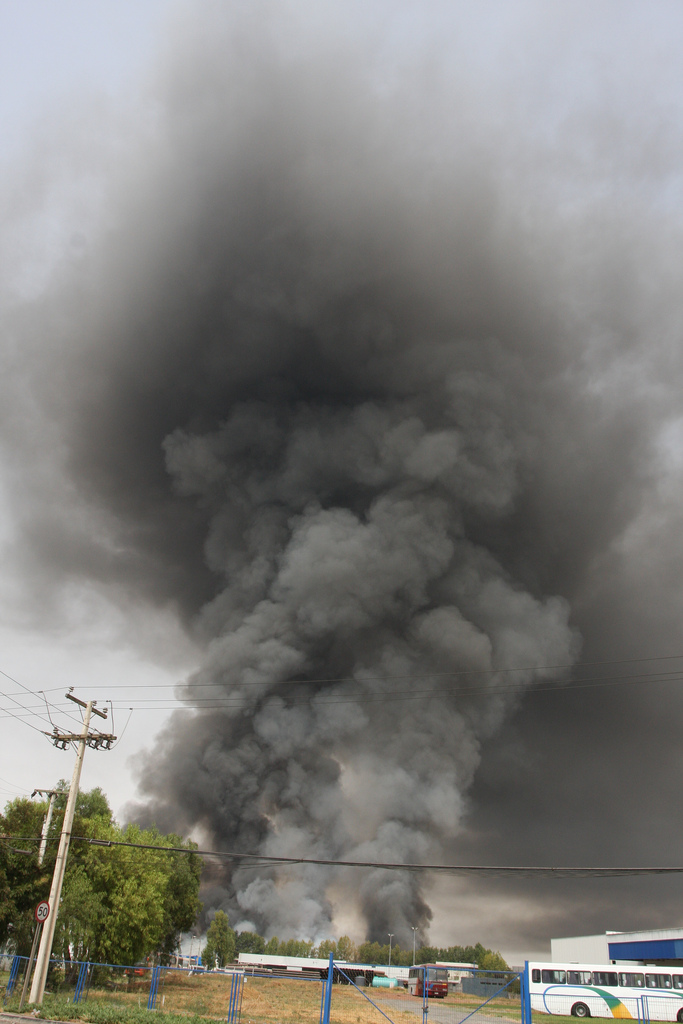
Fire at a plastics plant, Santiago, Chile.

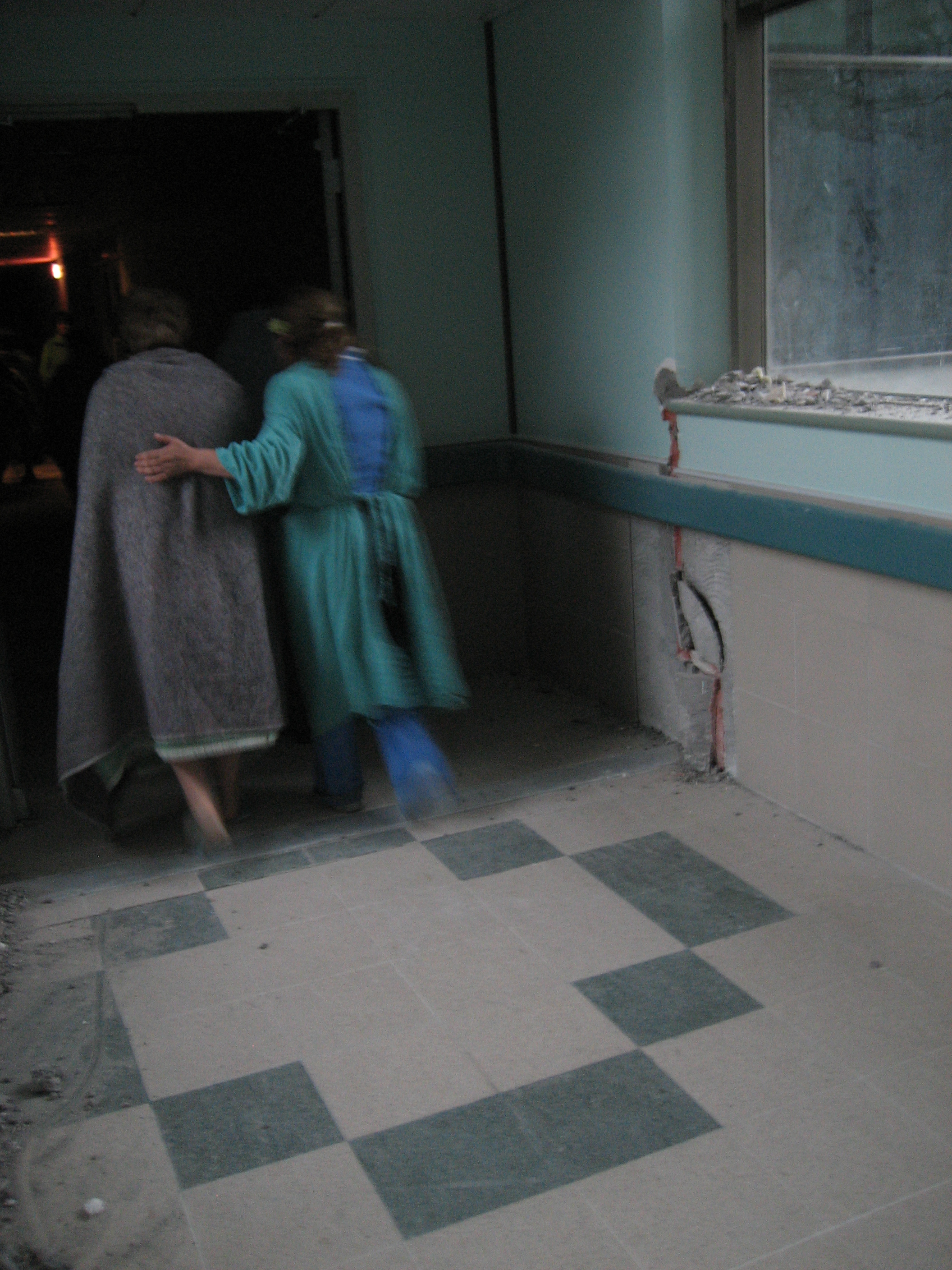
Hernán Henríquez Hospital of Temuco had to be evacuated after the earthquake.

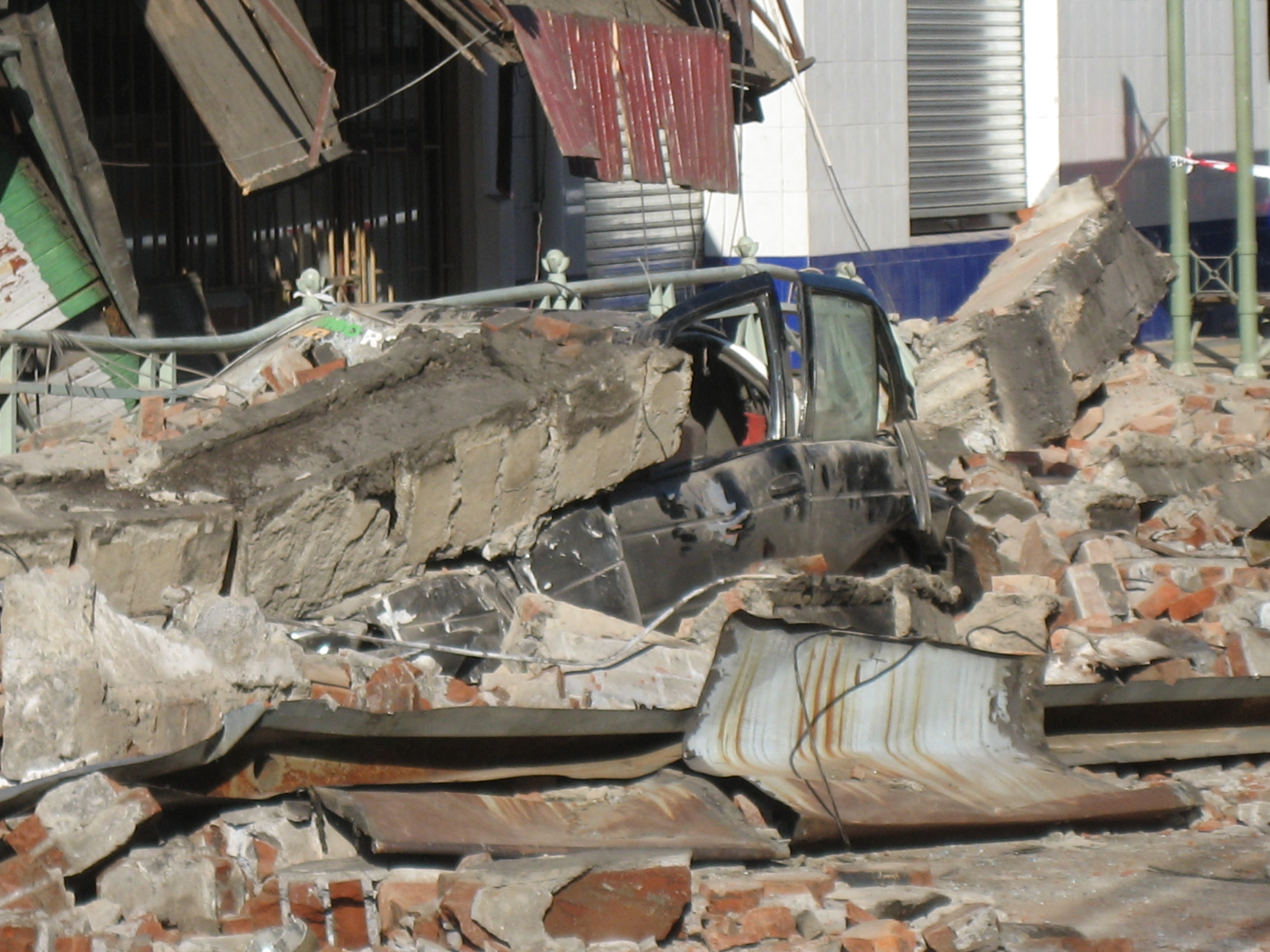
A car crushed by the rubble of a collapsed building in Temuco.

=== Modified Mercalli intensities for some localities ===
Locality	Country	USGS	SS	Population
Angol	Chile	VII		45k
Antofagasta	Chile		II	
Arauco	Chile	VIII		25k
Buín	Chile	VII		55k
Bulnes	Chile	VII		13k
Cabrero	Chile	VIII		18k
Calama	Chile		II	
Cañete	Chile	VIII		20k
Carahue	Chile	VI		12k
Cauquenes	Chile	VIII		31k
Chiguayante	Chile	VII		83k
Chillán	Chile	VII		150k
Chimbarongo	Chile	VII		17k
Coihueco	Chile	VII		7k
Collipulli	Chile	VII		16k
Concepción	Chile	VIII	IX	215k
Constitución	Chile	VIII		38k
Copiapó	Chile		III	
Coquimbo	Chile		V	
Coronel	Chile	VIII		93k
Corral	Chile	V		4k
Curanilahue	Chile	VIII		31k
Curicó	Chile	VII		102k
Cutral-Co	Argentina	V		47k
El Monte	Chile	VIII		23k
Freire	Chile	VII		8k
General Roca	Argentina	IV		73k
Graneros	Chile	VII		23k
La Calera	Chile	VII		49k
Huayco	Chile		III	
Illapel	Chile	VI		23k
Laja	Chile	VII		17k
La Ligua	Chile	VII		25k
La Unión	Chile	VI		26k
Lampa	Chile	VI		29k
Las Ánimas		VI		30k
Las Gaviotas	Argentina	V		2k
Lautaro	Chile	VII		22k
Lebu	Chile	VII		22k
Limache	Chile	VII		36k
Linares	Chile	VII		70k
Llaillay	Chile	VI		17k
Loncoche	Chile	VI		16k
Longaví	Chile	VII		6k
Los Andes	Chile	VII		57k
Los Ángeles	Chile	VII		125k
Lota	Chile	VII		50k
Machali	Chile	VII		28k
Melipilla	Chile	VII		63k
Mendoza	Argentina	V		877k
Molina	Chile	VII		29k
Mulchén	Chile	VII		22k
Nacimiento	Chile	VII		21k
Neuquén	Argentina	IV		242k
Nueva Imperial	Chile	VI		19k
Osorno	Chile	VI		136k
Paine	Chile	VII		33k
Panguipulli	Chile	VI		16k
Parral	Chile	VIII		27k
Peñaflor	Chile	VII		66k
Penco	Chile	VII		46k
Pitrufquen	Chile	VI		14k
Puerto Montt	Chile		V	
Quillota	Chile	VII		68k
Quilpué	Chile	VII		130k
Rancagua	Chile	VII	VIII	213k
Rengo	Chile	VII		38k
Río Bueno	Chile	V		15k
Salamanca	Chile	VI		13k
San Antonio	Chile	VII		86k
San Bernardo	Chile	VII		250k
San Carlos	Chile	VII		32k
San Clemente	Chile	VII		14k
San Felipe	Chile	VII		59k
San Javier	Chile	VII		22k
San Juan	Argentina	V		447k
San Luis	Argentina	V		184k
San Martín	Argentina	V		83k
San Rafael	Argentina	V		109k
San Vicente	Chile	VII		23k
Santa Cruz	Chile	VII		33k
Santiago	Chile	VII	VIII	4,837k
Talagante	Chile	VII		52k
Talca	Chile	VII	VIII	197k
Talcahuano	Chile	VII		253k
Temuco	Chile	VII	VIII	238k
Teno	Chile	VII		7k
Tierra Amarilla	Chile		III	
Tomé	Chile	VIII		47k
Traiguén	Chile	VII		14k
Valdivia	Chile	VI	VI	133k
Valparaíso	Chile	VII	VI	282k
Victoria	Chile	VII		25k
Vicuña	Chile		III-IV	
Vilcún	Chile	VI		9k
Villa Alemana	Chile	VII		97k
Villarrica	Chile	VI		32k
Viña del Mar	Chile	VII	VI	295k
Yumbel	Chile	VII		11k

Notes: USGS=United States Geological Survey, SS=Chile's Seismological Service.

=== Identified fatalities ===
The records of deaths were reported by a number of different agencies at different figures immediately after the earthquake. The official total is 525 dead, 25 missing not all of which are identified in the table below.

Deaths caused by the earthquake and tsunami by region (Note: The numbers were given by Chilean National Emergency Office (ONEMI) until 3. March. Up 14. March the Ministry of the Interior.)
Region	27. February	28. February	1. March	2. March	3. March	4. March	5. March	8. March
Valparaíso	4	16	16	18	20	16		24
Metropolitana	13	36	38	38	38	21		23
O'Higgins	12	46	48	48	48	3		46
Maule	34	541	544	587	587	177		269
Biobio	10	64	64	92	92	56		120
Araucanía	5	5	13	13	14	6		15
National total	78	708	723	796	799	279	452	497

Geographic distribution of the death toll (red: caused by the earthquake; blue: caused by the tsunami).

=== Population with destroyed or severely damaged homes ===
The table below shows the percentage of the regional population whose homes were destroyed or were severely damaged by the earthquake and tsunami in the six most affected regions. The data were collected between May and June 2010.

Region (north to south)	Percentage of regional population
Valparaíso	7.4
Santiago	4.8
O'Higgins	12.2
Maule	20.7
Biobío	17.8
Araucanía	5.1
Total (six regions)	8.8

Source: Casen Post-Earthquake Survey, Ministry of Planning.

South of Araucanía Region, in the city of Valdivia, 35 houses were destroyed and 44 others were damaged.

== Humanitarian response ==
Despite President Michelle Bachelet's earlier statement that Chile would only ask for international aid once it had assessed the extent of the damage, leaders of many countries and intergovernmental organizations, including the United Nations and European Union, responded to the earthquake and sent messages of condolence to the government and people of Chile over the loss of life and property. Argentina, Mexico, the United States, United Kingdom, People's Republic of China, Singapore, Haiti, and Pakistan were among the countries that responded earliest following the quake. Appeals for humanitarian aid were issued by the UK-based Oxfam, Save the Children, and others.

Chilean television host Don Francisco led a telethon called Chile helps Chile with the goal of raising 15 billion pesos (about US$29 million) needed to build 30,000 emergency houses ("mediaguas"). The charity event, which ran for 24 hours in Santiago starting on Friday 5 March at 22:00, was summoned by the government and organized by several Chilean NGOs. At 23:00 on Saturday the goal was doubled, collecting 30.2 billion pesos (about US$58 million).

The Chilean NGO Un Techo para Chile constructed 23,886 transitional houses for families affected by the earthquake.

== Conditions in the aftermath ==
=== Chaos and disorder ===
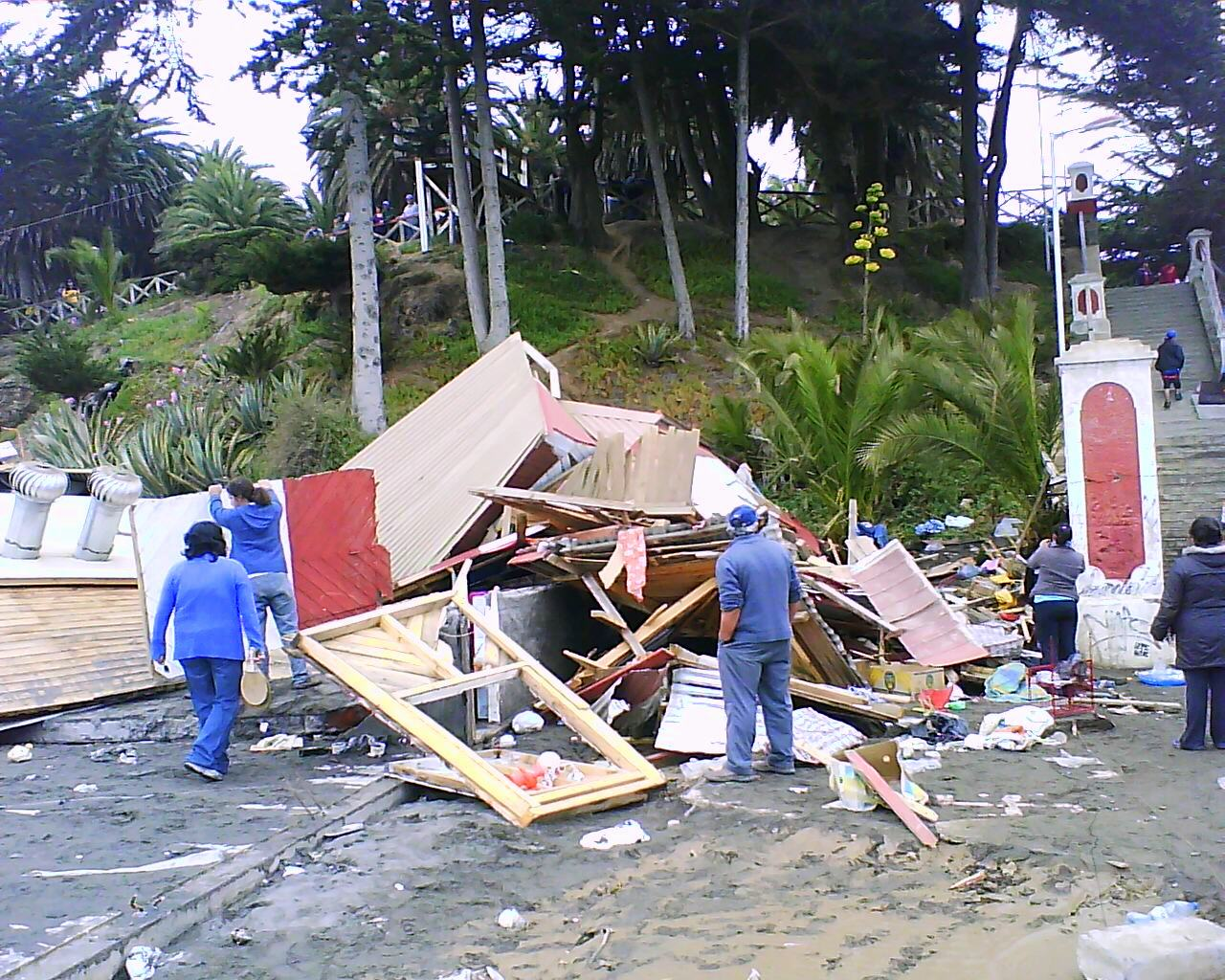
Kiosks destroyed by the tsunami in Pichilemu.

Nearly half the places in the country were declared "catastrophe zones", and curfews were imposed in some areas of looting and public disorder. On 28 February 2010, a day after the earthquake, some affected cities were chaotic, with extensive looting of supermarkets in Concepción. Items stolen included not only food and other necessities, but also electronic goods and other durable merchandise. To control vandalism, a special force of carabineros (police) was sent to disperse rioters with tear gas and water cannons. However, measures were taken late. The outgoing president didn't want to remind people of the Dictatorship years by militarizing the streets, thus failed to provide assistance on time to the city. When the situation became unsustainable and all sectors of the population were demanding actions, the government authorized the use of the military to control the affected cities. Despite these and other government acts (including the curfews), pillaging continued in both urban and rural areas of the affected zones. Reportedly, military police arrested 160 in Concepción on 1 and 2 March.

In Concepción, despite the militarization of the zone, mobs continued to steal from supermarkets and went as far as to set one store ablaze. The government warned looters they would face the full weight of the law, as penalties for stealing are increased under a state of catastrophe. A week after the quake the police—tipped by neighbors—arrested three people with massive quantities of looted goods stashed in their homes. Other looted goods such as mattresses, furniture, television sets and other electronic appliances were abandoned in the streets of Concepción during the following days.

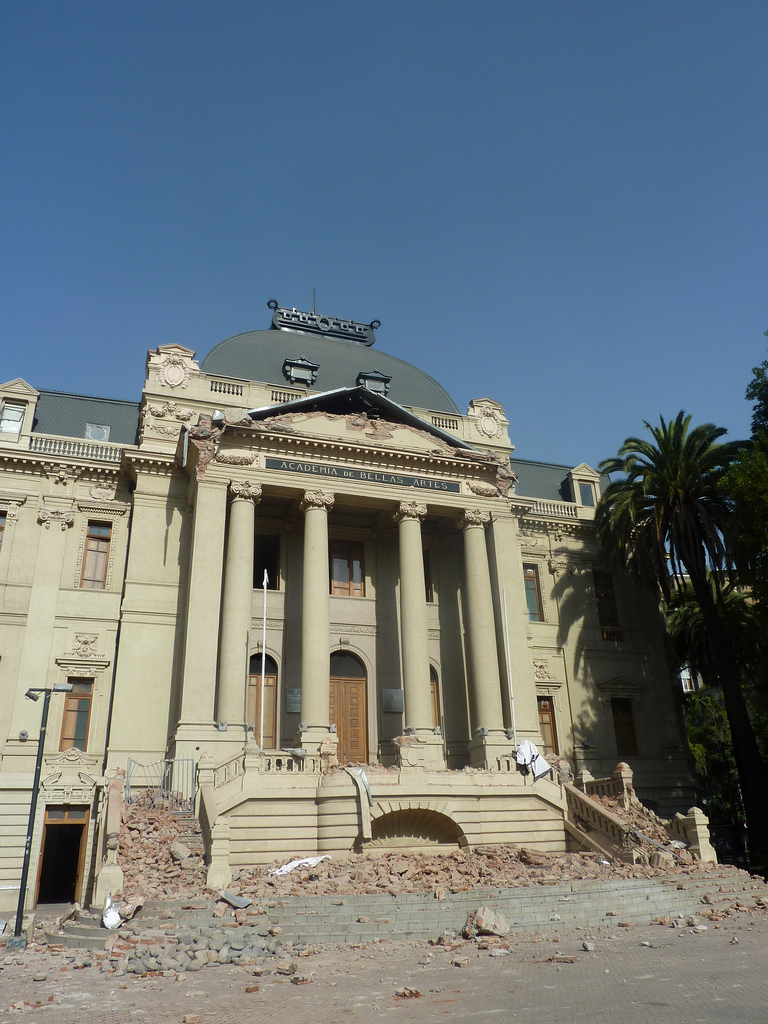
The damaged Museum of Fine Arts

According to the BBC on 5 March, the city and fishing port of Talcahuano, which lies but a few kilometers down the coast from Concepción, has been left largely to fend for itself. Neighbourhood vigilante groups, including one led by a public works employee with a gun license, and the few police present allow such behavior as residents' siphoning fuel from tanks at a petrol station, but step in if someone starts to attack a cash machine. One man stated, "I've personally saved dozens of people from attack in this apartment block."

Chileans living in regions not affected by the earthquake (including those living abroad) also grieved, as they sought to learn more regarding kinsmen and friends affected by the earthquake. In the hardest-hit zones there was no communication with the exterior because of the failure of electricity and the destruction of telephone lines.

=== Prison escape ===
In the prison of El Manzano in Concepción, a prison riot began after a failed escape attempt by the inmates. Different parts of the prison were set afire and the riot was brought under control only after the guards shot into the air and received help from military units.

By 1 March, prison guards in a prison in Chillán had recaptured 36 of 203 prisoners who had escaped following the earthquake. During their escape, prisoners burned seven houses close to the prison. A witness in Chillán asserted that he had been robbed by prisoners with a machine gun who had also forced his girlfriend to kiss them. Another witness alleged sexual molestation by around twenty men who were believed to be escaped prisoners. The leading Chilean newspaper El Mercurio described the situation in Chillán as reminiscent of the "Wild West".

=== Government response ===
Four hours after the earthquake, when the death count was still low, President Bachelet gave a press conference in which she informed the population of the situation and stated that Chile did not yet need international aid. However, about two million people were affected by the quake with more than 500,000 houses uninhabitable. In many cities, people slept in tents, in parks or simply on the streets for fear of aftershocks. The government began distributing food and other vital aid around the country.

On 28 February, President Bachelet said that her government had reached an agreement with the major supermarkets which would allow them to give away basic foodstuffs in stock to people affected by the earthquake. By 28 February, the Santiago Metro rapid-transit network was already partially up and running and expected to be fully operative on the following day, 1 March.

On 4 March, President-elect Sebastián Piñera, who assumed office on 11 March, was quoted as saying that his goals were "to cope with the emergency needs of citizens, find people who are still missing, provide prompt and timely assistance to the sick and wounded, and restore law and order so that people can return to peace."

=== Economic recovery ===
Authorities of the central port city of San Antonio speaking on 3 March 2010, stated that the port had returned to eighty percent of capacity. On the same date, Raul Maturana, a spokesman for the Federation of Port Workers' union, stated that the port of Valparaíso was operating normally. However, ports in southern Chile, which were closer to the epicenter, remained closed.

On 4 March, President Bachelet said that Chile would need international loans and three to four years to rebuild.

=== Food scarcity ===
On 10 March the National Commission for Agricultural emergencies (CNEA) assured that milk and wheat prices would not rise, despite fears of lack of fuel supply for transport and harvest of these products. In the same CNEA report the mill associations of central and southern Chile are said to have expressed that they had currently no production difficulties. Despite this on 11 March newspaper La Segunda cited the president of the bakeries association complaining on unjustified price rises for flour, who said of cases of price rises of 10 to 20%.

The earthquake affected production at the Compañía de Cervecerías Unidas (CCU) and Cervecería Chile factories that together have a 90% share of the Chilean beer market. With an average annual per capita consumption of 36 liters, scarcity caused prices to rise from 990–1500 to 2000 Chilean pesos per litre. CCU responded by increasing capacity of their plant in Temuco that did not suffer major damage during the earthquake and by importing beer from their factories in Argentina. 50 trucks with beer are reported to have reached Santiago from Argentina. In March 2010, ten CCU executives said that the country will not run out of beer and that within two to three months production levels would be normalized. Liquor store owners expressed complaints regarding a beer rationing scheme implemented by CCU. The scarcity favored consumption of "premium beers" like Kunstmann and Paceña.

== Tsunami ==
A tsunami warning was first declared for Chile and Peru, and a tsunami watch for Ecuador, Colombia, Antarctica, Panama and Costa Rica. The warning was later extended to a Pacific Ocean-wide warning, covering all coastal areas on the Pacific Ocean except the west coast of the United States, British Columbia, and Alaska. Hawaiian media reported that tsunami warning sirens first sounded at 06:00 local time. The U.S. Tsunami Warning Center issued advisories about potential tsunami of less than 1 m (3 ft 3 in) striking the Pacific Ocean coastline between California and most of Alaska late in the afternoon or through the evening 12 or more hours after the initial earthquake. The tsunami warning was cancelled for all countries except Japan and Russia in PTWC Bulletin 18 of 00:12 UTC on 28 February 2010.

In general, tsunamis tend to come in several waves, of which the first may not be the highest.

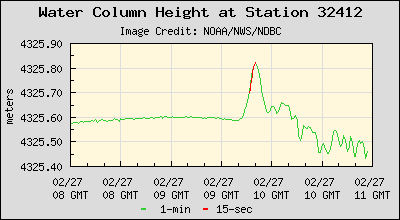
The tsunami's passage as recorded by National Data Buoy Center Deep-ocean Assessment and Reporting of Tsunamis (DART) buoy 34142, located in the southeastern Pacific Ocean 630 nautical miles (1170 km) southwest of Lima, Peru.

The U.S. National Weather Service's Pacific Tsunami Warning Center issued a tsunami warning throughout a huge swathe of the Pacific region, including Antarctica. In the Americas, the warning extended to Chile (including Easter Island), Colombia, Costa Rica, Ecuador, El Salvador, Guatemala,. Honduras, Mexico, and Panama. A warning was also issued for the Oceania and Pacific Islands nations and territories of American Samoa, Australia, the Cook Islands, the Federated States of Micronesia (including the FSM states of Chuuk, Kosrae, Pohnpei and Yap), Fiji, French Polynesia, Guam, Hawaii, Jarvis Island, Johnston Island, the Kermadec Islands, Kiribati, Marcus Island, the Marshall Islands, Midway Island, New Caledonia, New Zealand, Niue, the Northern Mariana Islands, Palau, Papua New Guinea, Pitcairn Islands, Samoa, the Solomon Islands, Tokelau, Tonga, Tuvalu, Wallis and Futuna and Wake Island. Tsunami warnings were also in effect as far away as East and Southeast Asia including Japan, Indonesia, Hong Kong, the Philippines, Russia and Taiwan.

Coastal areas of Canada's westernmost province British Columbia was under a tsunami advisory, and this was the most alarming advisory as the earthquake occurred during the same time as the 2010 Winter Olympics in Vancouver. No large wave was expected to strike British Columbia, but strong local ocean currents combined with a wave put low-lying coastal regions at risk of flooding. The first wave was expected to reach southern British Columbia at 15:11 local time. Residents were advised to avoid beaches, harbors and marinas.

A tsunami advisory was also issued for coastal areas of California, Oregon, Washington and southern Alaska in the United States. This tsunami advisory was canceled as of 07:13 UTD on 28 February.

Russian authorities lifted a tsunami alert for the Kamchatka coast, after the arrival of a 0.8 m (2 ft 7 in) surge that caused no damage. The tsunami was also reported to be small along the Japanese coast, and passed without incident. Many coastal areas in Japan had been evacuated as a precaution.

The projections use DART (Deep-ocean Assessment and Reporting of Tsunamis) gauges spread along the sea floor, which is a fairly new technology. Initial deep sea readings showed wave height of 25 cm (9.8 in), which is huge for deep water, according to Gerard Fryer of the Pacific Tsunami Warning Center. He went on to say, "although it was huge, we didn't quite know what it meant because we haven't much experience with those. As we get more under our belts, we'll get better."

=== Chile ===
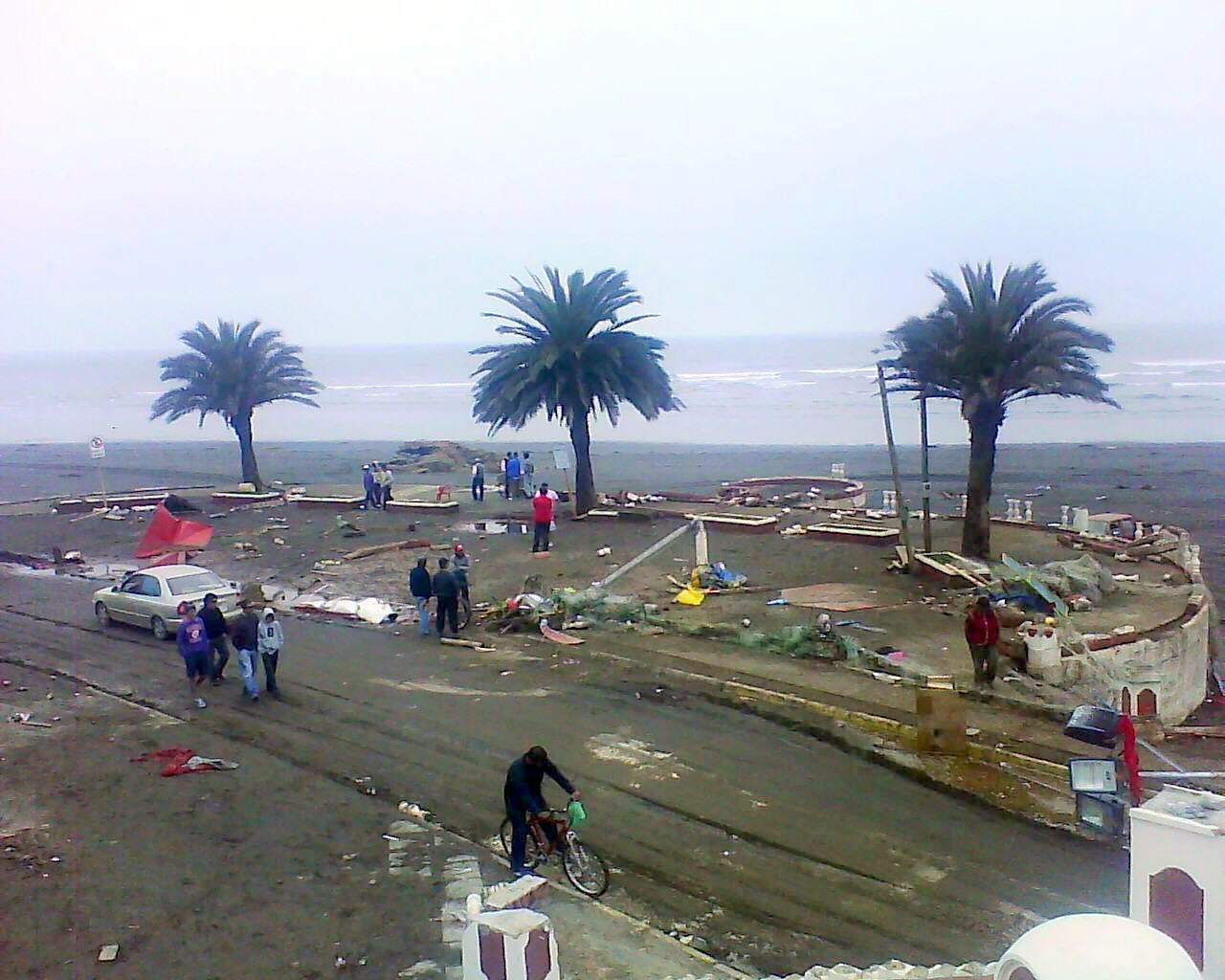
Agustín Ross balcony damaged after the earthquake and tsunami in Pichilemu.

Some 30 minutes after the first shock, consecutive tsunamis hit coastal towns, among which Constitución suffered the hardest damage, with maximum wave heights of approximately 24.1 m (79 ft), and around 350 people killed. subsequently, a tsunami amplitude of up to 2.6 m (8 ft 6 in) high was recorded in the sea at Valparaíso. A wave amplitude of 2.34 m (7.68 ft) was recorded at Talcahuano in the Biobío Region. Robinson Crusoe Island, the largest of the Juan Fernández Islands, was struck by a large wave which led to the deaths of four people on the island, with eleven people reported as missing, according to Provincial Governor Iván De La Maza. President Bachelet is reported to have sent an aid mission to the remote island.

As a precaution against the coming tsunami, partial evacuation was ordered in Easter Island, about 3,510 km (2,180 mi) away from the coast of Chile. The tsunami wave arrived in Easter Island at 12:05 UTC, measuring 0.35 m (1 ft 2 in).

On 27 February, defense minister Francisco Vidal said that the Chilean Navy had made a mistake by not immediately issuing a tsunami warning after the earthquake, a step that could have helped coastal villagers flee to higher ground sooner. However, an alarm was later sounded by port captains and saved some lives. Mariano Rojas Bustos, then head of Chile's oceanographic service SHOA, which is part of the country's navy, was later fired for the organization's failure to provide clear warnings about the tsunami.

=== Asia Pacific ===
New Zealand

Initially, the New Zealand Ministry of Civil Defence and Emergency Management (CDEM) said they did not expect a tsunami to reach New Zealand, but later issued a warning stating that waves of up to 1 m (3 ft 3 in) high were likely for the eastern and later the entire New Zealand coast. By 19:55 UTC (08:40 local), CDEM reported wave activity of 50 cm (1.6 ft) in the Chatham Islands, and 2 m (6 ft 7 in) surges were reported there later in the morning. A surge 2.2 m (7 ft 3 in) high hit the South Island's Banks Peninsula, while surges up to 1 m (3 ft 3 in) high were reported in the northern North Island. By mid afternoon (local time), Civil Defence had downgraded the tsunami warning to an alert, while still advising that sea levels could change quickly for up to 24 hours from the initial surge.

Antarctica

The U.S. Antarctic Program's coastal station along the Antarctic Peninsula, Palmer Station, went on a tsunami alert shortly after the earthquake struck Chile. To prepare for a possible tsunami, station personnel removed all Zodiac boats from the water and moved any materials from low-lying areas that waves could have swept away. Personnel also retreated to the station's highest building, GWR, while the tsunami warning was in effect, Ellis said. Palmer personnel developed a tsunami emergency plan following the 2004 earthquake in the Indian Ocean that created a tsunami that killed more than 230,000 people in 14 countries. While no noticeable tsunami occurred at Palmer, the station tide monitor displayed bumps of several centimeters, signifying that a small wave had indeed reached the shores of Anvers Island.

Australia

The Joint Australian Tsunami Warning Center (JATWC) sent out tsunami warnings for New South Wales, Queensland, Lord Howe Island, Norfolk Island, Tasmania, and Victoria. The organization warned of the possibility of dangerous waves, strong ocean currents and foreshore flooding to occur on the east coast of Australia for several hours on Sunday. As a result of the warnings, patrolled beaches in New South Wales and Queensland remained closed (red flags) and lifeguards ushered people to leave the water. However beach goers and surfers ignored the warnings. Numerous onlookers also crowded parts of the shore to view potential effects of the tsunami. The beach ban was lifted by the end of the day and there was no reports of damage, flooding or other emergencies. Tsunami waves of between 10 and 50 cm (3.9 and 19.7 in) were recorded and their surges were believed to have created strong currents. Increases in sea levels include: Norfolk Island 50 cm (20 in), Gold Coast (Qld) 20 cm (7.9 in), Port Kembla (NSW) 14 cm (5.5 in), Southport (Tas) 17 cm (6.7 in).

French Polynesia

A wave measuring up to 1.8 m (5 ft 11 in) high struck portions of French Polynesia between 15:50 to 17:50 UTC with no reports of injuries as of February 28, 2010. A wave 4 meters high was reported to have struck Hiva Oa in the Marquesas Islands. The first waves were expected to hit the main island of Tahiti at approximately 16:50 UTC (07:50 local). Cars and other automobiles were banned from roads closer than 500 m (1,600 ft) from the Pacific Ocean.

Réseau France Outre-mer in Papeete reported that a wave measuring less than 1 m (3 ft 3 in) passed east of the Gambier Islands with no damage, according to Monique Richeton, the mayor of Rikitea. Residents of the Tuamotus, which are low-lying, were told to move to the highest points on the island.

American Samoa

The first wave was expected to reach American Samoa, which was still recovering from the 2009 Samoa earthquake and tsunami, at 08:51 local time. Lieutenant Governor Ipulasi Aitofele Sunia urged residents not to rush to A'oloau, a high elevation area on Tutuila, as it could cause traffic jams, putting safety at risk. Many coastal towns, including the main city of Pago Pago, had already been heavily damaged in the 2009 tsunami. The first wave arrived on Pago Plaza at 21:58 UTC.

Philippines

The Philippine Institute of Volcanology and Seismology (Phivolcs) issued tsunami alert level 1 with tsunami wave(s) expected to hit the eastern coast of the Philippines on Sunday between 05:00 and 06:30 UTC (13:00 and 14:30 local). Residents of 19 eastern provinces "are advised to prepare for possible evacuation." However, at 15:15 on 28 February 2010, all warnings were canceled.

Hawaii

United States Senators Daniel Inouye and Daniel Akaka issued a joint press release announcing the first tsunami evacuation in Hawaii since 1994. Warning sirens were sounded throughout the state, as hotels in Waikiki evacuated tourists at 6 a.m. People in tall buildings were encouraged to move above the third floor. Waves measuring 2.7 m (8 ft 10 in) high were originally predicted to strike Hilo Bay on the Big Island of Hawai'i at 11:05 local time (21:05 GMT), but by 11:18, major receding and waves had not been reported on the shoreline. By 11:40, several waves hit the islands amounting to raising and lowering of the sea near the coast, and a fourth wave hit around 13:12. The tsunami warning for Hawaii was canceled in the early afternoon on Saturday, 27 February.

Gerard Fryer, a geophysicist for the Pacific Tsunami Warning Center was quoted as saying: "We expected the waves to be bigger in Hawaii, maybe about 50 percent bigger than they actually were." Early in the morning, the Center expected waves of 3 m (9.8 ft). In actuality, the highest tsunami waves ended up being about 1.5–1.8 m (4 ft 11 in – 5 ft 11 in) peak to trough.

=== North America ===
British Columbia

At around 23:00 UTC (15:00 local), a tsunami warning was issued for coastal British Columbia. Extra precautions were already in place due to the 2010 Winter Olympics being held in Vancouver at the time.

California

Small waves were expected in Southern California, and receding was reported at Long Beach. Minor damage was reported on some coastal areas. The tsunami damaged navigation buoys at Ventura. Additionally, a boat was torn loose from its mooring and minor erosion occurred within Ventura Harbor. Damage to docks and pilings in the area was moderate.

Guerrero

In Guerrero, surges of between 30 cm (12 in) and 1 m (3 ft 3 in) and receding of up to 10 m (33 ft) were reported, and three small vessels were sunk at Tecpán de Galeana. The state tourism authorities announced they would be sending a letter to the CNN news network to protest the "alarming" way in which it had forecast a tsunami for the major tourist destination of Acapulco.

=== Tsunami-related aid given ===
Argentina has sent construction teams to Chiloé Island to help reconstruct some of the washed away coastal buildings. In July 2010, the government of Argentina released a statement that they would lend $300 million to Chile for reconstruction efforts using Argentine goods.

=== Data ===
The following data, published by the Pacific Tsunami Warning Center and the National Tsunami Warning Center, lists measured and reported values of the tsunami when it arrived at specific places. Some data is taken from the Chilean Army.

Tsunami arrival data
Station	Country or territory	Latitude	Longitude	Time (UTC)	Height (m)	Height (ft)
Pichilemu	Chile	34.23 S	72.0 W	06:48	3.02	10.0
Talcahuano	Chile	36.9 S	75.4 W	06:53	2.34	7.7
Valparaíso	Chile	33 S	71.6 W	07:08	1.29	4.2
Corral	Chile	39.9 S	73.4 W	07:39	0.90	2.9
San Felix	Chile	26.3 S	80.1 W	08:15	0.53	1.7
Caldera	Chile	27.1 S	70.8 W	08:34	0.45	1.5
Ancud	Chile	41.9 S	73.8 W	08:38	0.62	2.0
Coquimbo	Chile	30 S	71.3 W	08:52	1.32	4.3
Iquique	Chile	20.2 S	70.1 W	09:07	0.28	0.9
DART Lima	Peru	18 S	86.4 W	09:41	0.24	0.8
Antofagasta	Chile	23.2 S	70.4 W	09:41	0.49	1.6
Arica	Chile	18.5 S	70.3 W	10:08	0.94	3.1
Callao	Peru	12.1 S	77.2 W	10:29	0.36	1.2
Easter Island	Chile	27.2 S	109.5 W	12:05	0.35	1.1
Quepos	Costa Rica	9.45 N	84.15 W	14:16	0.24	0.8
Galapagos Islands	Ecuador	0.4 S	90.3 W	14:52	0.35	1.2
DART Marquesas Islands	French Polynesia	8.5 S	125 W	15:31	0.18	0.6
Rikitea	French Polynesia	23.1 S	134.9 W	15:59	0.15	0.5
DART Manzanillo		16.0 N	107 W	16:11	0.07	0.2
Manzanillo	Mexico	19.1 N	104.3 W	17:05	0.32	1.0
Hiva Oa	French Polynesia	9.8 S	139.0 W	17:41	1.79	5.9
Nuku Hiva	French Polynesia	8.9 S	140.1 W	17:45	0.95	3.1
Papeete	French Polynesia	17.5 N	149.6 W	18:10	0.16	0.5
Cabo San Lucas	Mexico	22.9 N	109.9 W	18:33	0.36	1.2
Rarotonga	Cook Islands	21.2 S	159.8 W	19:07	0.15	0.5
Acapulco	Mexico	16.8 N	99.9 W	19:31	0.62	2.0
DART San Diego		32.2 N	120.7 W	19:31	0.06	0.2
Lottin Point	New Zealand	37.6 S	178.2 E	19:34	0.15	0.5
DART Tonga		23 S	168.1 W	20:03	0.04	0.1
Apia	Samoa	13.8 S	171.8 W	20:18	0.13	0.4
Nukuʻalofa	Tonga	21.1 S	175.2 W	20:24	0.1	0.3
Pago Pago	American Samoa	14.3 S	170.7 W	20:27	0.22	0.7
Monterey, California	United States	36.6 N	121.9 W	20:31	0.28	1.1
San Diego, California	United States	32.7 N	117.2 W	20:36	0.13	0.4
San Francisco, California	United States	37.8 N	122.5 W	21:20	0.26	0.8
Hilo, Hawaii	United States	19.7 N	154.9 W	21:20	0.86	2.8
Kuamalapau, Hawaii	United States	20.8 N	156.9 W	21:36	0.18	0.6
Kahului, Hawaii	United States	20.9 N	156.5 W	21:47	0.98	3.2
Santa Barbara, California	United States	34.4 N	119.7 W	21:50	0.53	1.7
Barber's Point, Hawaii	United States	21.3 N	158.1 W	21:57	0.12	0.4
Honolulu, Hawaii	United States	21.3 N	150.4 W	22:00	0.25	0.8
Kawaihae, Hawaii	United States	20 N	155.5 W	22:11	0.52	1.7
Crescent City, California	United States	41.7 N	124.2 W	22:13	0.37	1.2
Vanuatu	Vanuatu	17.8 S	168.3 E	22:46	0.15	0.5
Johnston Atoll	United States	16.7 N	169.5 W	22:48	0.22	0.7
Nawiliwili, Hawaii	United States	22 N	159.4 W	23:23	0.37	1.2
Sitka, Alaska	United States	57.1 N	135.3 W	00:11 28 Feb	0.08	0.3
Guam	Guam	13.4 N	144.7 E	03:07	0.16	0.5
Minamitorishima	Japan	24.1N	153.5E	03:43	0.1	0.3
DART Saipan		19.1 N	155.8 E	03:55	0.08	0.3
Otsuchi, Iwate	Japan	39.21 N	141.54 E	06:43	1.45	4.35
Yamada, Iwate	Japan	39.47 N	141.95 E	08:14	1.61	4.85
Hachinohe, Aomori	Japan	40.30 N	141.29 E	08:44	0.9	2.7
Nemuro, Hokkaido	Japan	43.20 N	145.35 E	09:23	1.0	3.0
Kuji, Iwate	Japan	40.11 N	141.46 E	10:01	1.2	3.6
Susaki, Kōchi	Japan	33.24 N	133.17 E	10:42	1.2	3.6
Shibushi, Kagoshima	Japan	31.30 N	131.03 E	10:56	1.0	3.0

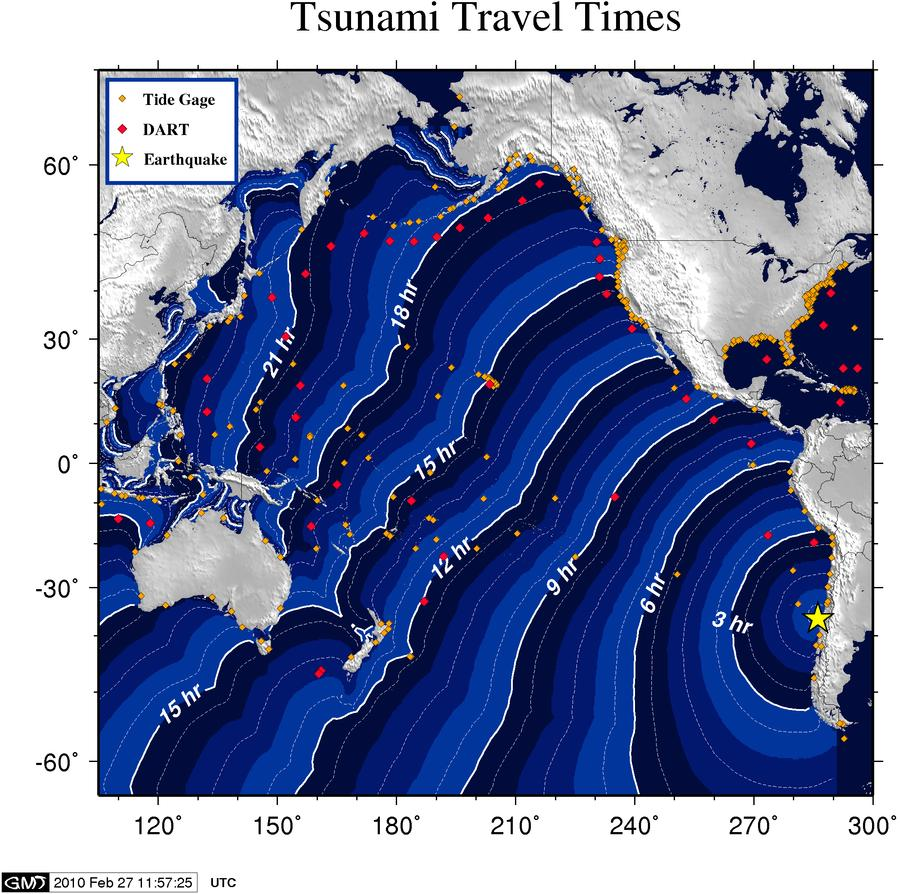
Tsunami ETA NOAA (hour 0=06:34 UTC 27 Feb)

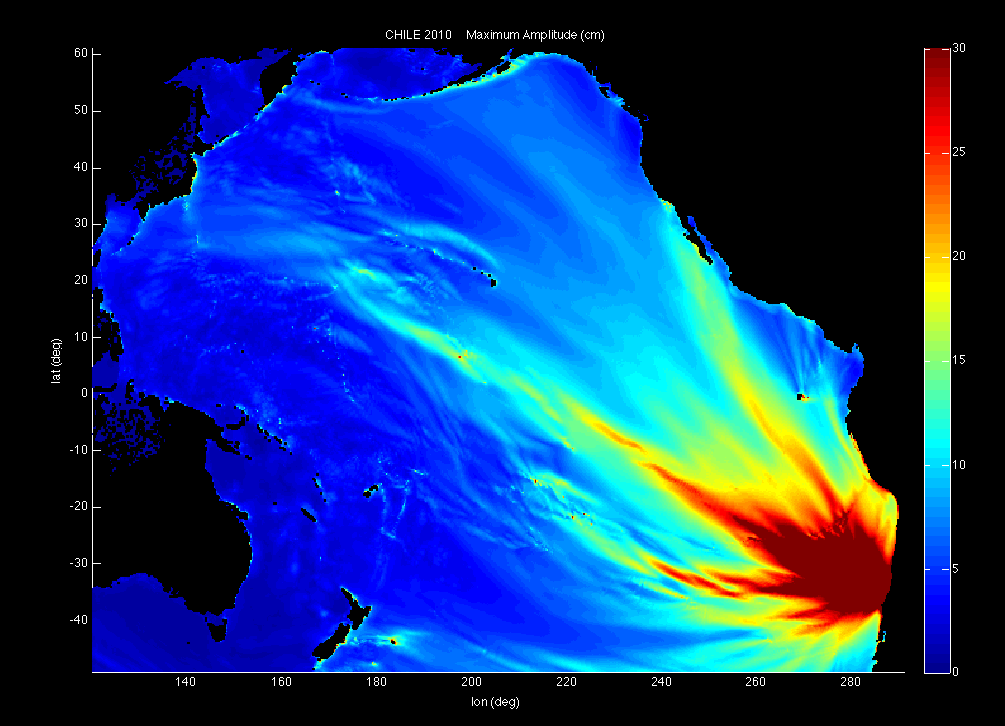
The energy model map of the tsunami.

Countries with coastal areas that were at risk (in pink).

== See also ==
- 03:34: Earthquake in Chile
- 2010 Chile blackout
- 2010 Haiti earthquake
- 2010 Pichilemu earthquakes
- 2011–2012 Puyehue-Cordón Caulle eruption
- Aftershock
- Geology of Chile
- List of earthquakes in Chile
- List of megathrust earthquakes
- Lists of 21st-century earthquakes
- Lists of earthquakes
- The Year of the Tiger (2011 film)
