= New Brooklyn =

- Directed by: Christopher Cannucciari
- Written by: Christopher Cannucciari
- Produced by: Christopher Cannucciari; Abby Cope
- Starring: Blanca Lewin; Pablo Cerda; Matt Cavenaugh
- Cinematography: Mark T. Karinja
- Distributed by: New Brooklyn Features
- Release date: 2008
- Country: United States
- Language: English

New Brooklyn is a 2008 feature film directed by Christopher Cannucciari, starring Blanca Lewin, Matt Cavenaugh, Frank Harts, Pablo Cerda, Kat Ross and Frank Nasso.

New Brooklyn is Blanca Lewin's first feature film in English. Her previous works include Sangre Eterna, Sábado, una película en tiempo real and En la cama. The film was released to various film festivals beginning late Fall 2008. The film is a drama about the movable and unmovable obstacles in the lives of Brooklyn dwellers, centering on the story of a recent South American arrival, Marta Piro (Lewin). The film includes a mix of professional actors and Brooklyn native non-actors.

== Synopsis ==
"Brooklyn is in transition from warehouses and barrios to a gentrified playground of boutiques and ultra-modern condominiums. New Brooklyn is a gritty depiction of survival alongside a tumultuously changing city."

== Plot ==
Marta and Angela are Brooklyn roommates. Angela has lived in Brooklyn her whole life, Marta has recently arrived from South America. Marta becomes exploited by both the city and Angela's brother, Eddie. She desperately waits for her Chilean boyfriend, Alvaro to arrive and make things better. Marta, it seems, is a woman with her life on hold. She moved from Chile to get work as an actress in New York, but she spends all of her free time talking about and waiting for her boyfriend, Alvaro (Pablo Cerda), to join her from Chile. Once he arrives, however, he is so supremely uninterested in her that he rarely makes eye contact with her and bolts from the apartment as soon as he dumps his stuff on the bed. After Alvaro arrives only to break up with her, Marta must learn to find the courage to stand up for herself and confront Angela and Eddie.

== Cast ==
- Blanca Lewin as Marta Piro
- Pablo Cerda as Alvaro
- Matt Cavenaugh as Brad Steward
- Frank Harts as Eddie
- Shelley Thomas as Angela
- Frank Nasso as Thuglio
