= Blanca Lewin =

Chilean actress

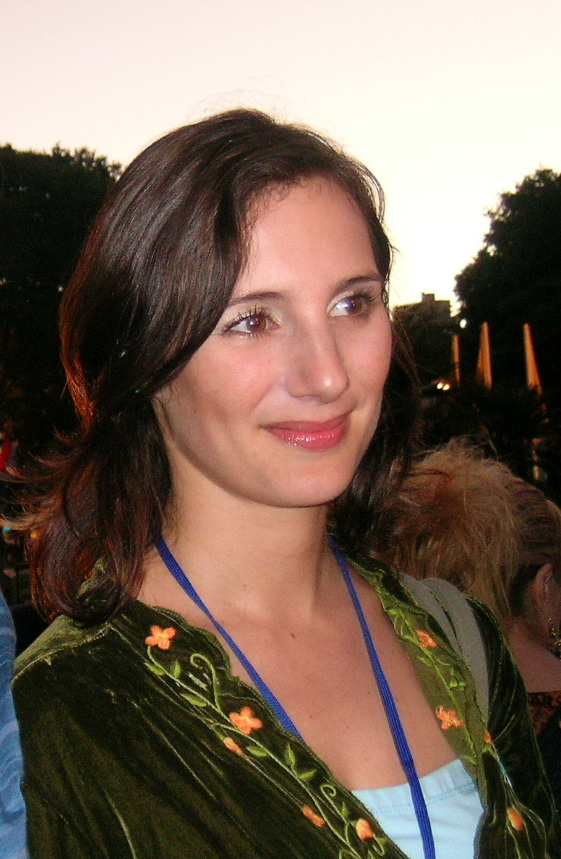
- Lewin in 2006
- Education: Pontifical Catholic University of Chile
- Occupation: Actress
- Partner: Daniel Matamala (2013-2021)
- Children: Marina Quinteros

Blanca Esperanza Lewin Gajardo (born 7 August 1974) is a Chilean actress. She studied at Pontificia Universidad Católica de Chile. She is best known for her role as Lola Padilla in the soap opera Lola by Canal 13. She has won awards including the Altazor for Best Actress three times and Festival de Cine Internacional de Palm Springs.

== Career ==
Lewin began her career in 1996, right after graduating from the theater program at the Pontifical Catholic University. At that time, she was a promising yet unknown actress when a casting director from a modeling agency offered her an audition at the cable music channel, Vía X. Impressed by her talent, she was immediately recruited as a VJ. Simultaneously, she received an offer from TVN to act in the TV series Tic Tac, and from that moment on, her career took off like a whirlwind. She went on to participate in successful and memorable soap operas such as Iorana, La fiera, Romané, Pampa ilusión, Puertas adentro, Los Pincheira, and Cómplices, among others.

Lewin made her debut in the film industry as a lead actress in the horror movies Ángel negro (2000) and Sangre Eterna (2002), both directed by Chilean filmmaker Jorge Olguín. Her exceptional performance in the movie Sábado by Matías Bize earned her the Best Actress award at the Mannheim-Heidelberg International Film Festival in Germany. She further showcased her acting prowess in the film En la cama, where she played the leading role alongside Gonzalo Valenzuela. Additionally, she co-hosted the program La liga, which was broadcast on Mega.

In 2007, Lewin achieved significant success in her career with the TV series Lola on Canal 13, where she obtained her first leading role. This role established her as one of the prominent female faces in the drama department of the channel and solidified her position as one of the most important actresses in Chile. She also ventured into the English-language film industry, traveling to New York to shoot her first English-language film, New Brooklyn, directed by Christopher Cannucciari, alongside actor Pablo Cerda. In 2008, she portrayed Clara in Rubén Alonso's debut film Extrañamente íntimos, filmed in Valladolid, Spain, marking her entry into the Spanish film industry.

Since 2003, Lewin has also been a columnist for the magazine El Periodista, where she shares her insights on national and international events every two weeks. In 2010, she co-starred in the soap opera Feroz, playing the role of Ángela Carrera. This was followed by her appearances in nighttime soap operas Peleles (2011) and Secretos en el jardín (2014) on Canal 13. She also played Ana, the art teacher, in the successful TVN series El reemplazante for two seasons. In 2015, she returned to TVN and secured one of the leading roles in Matriarcas, portraying Chantal Chávez, the main antagonist. Finally, in 2018, she made another return to Canal 13 to participate in the highly successful soap opera Pacto de sangre.

== Filmography ==
=== Film ===
Title	Year	Role	Notes
Ángel Negro	2000	Ángel Cruz	
Sangre Eterna	2002	Carmila	
Sábado	2003	Blanca	
In Bed	2005	Daniela	
New Brooklyn	2008	Marta	
Íntimos y Extraño	2008	Clara	
The Life of Fish	2010	Beatriz	
Bombal	2012	María Luisa Bombal	
Family Life	2017	Consuelo	
A Yard of Jackals	2024	Laura	

=== Television ===
Title	Year	Role	Notes
Oro Verde	1997	Consuelo	
Tic Tac	1997	Macarena Mendizábal	
Iorana	1998	Tiare Tepano	
La Fiera	1999	Tránsito "Tato" Catrilaf	
Romané	2000	Milenka California	
Vigías del Sur	2000	Lorena	(season 2)
Pampa Ilusión	2001	Clara Montes	
Rojo Fama Contrafama	2002	Herself/ Judge	TV shows (season 1)
Puertas Adentro	2003	Déborah Castro	
Los Pincheira	2004	Samira Abu Kassem	
Los Capo	2005	Beatrice Capo	
Cómplices	2006	Emilia Pedraza	
La Liga	2007	Host	TV shows (season 1)
Lola	2007-2008	Lola Padilla / Pepa Galindo	
Locos por el Baile	2008	Herself/Guest Judge	TV shows (season 2, episode 1)
Feroz	2010	Ángela Carrera	
Peleles	2011	Mónica Dávila	
Prófugos	2011-2013	Laura Ferragut	
Prófugos Macking-of	2011	Herself	Documentary film
El Reemplazante	2012	Ana	
Matriarcas	2015	Chantal Chavez	Antagonist in Soap Opera

=== Theatre ===
- Edipo - 2003
- Roberto Zucco - 2006
- Desafección - 2006
- Las Tres Hermanas - 2008
