= 03:34: Earthquake in Chile =

- Directed by: Juan Pablo Ternicier
- Written by: Mateo Iribarren
- Starring: Andrea Freund; Marcelo Alonso; Loreto Aravena; Fernando Gómez-Rovira; Eduardo Paxeco; Andrés Reyes; Gabriela Medina
- Release dates: February 27, 2011 (Dichato, Chile)
- Running time: 100 minutes
- Country: Chile
- Language: Spanish
- Budget: US$ 1.4 million

03:34: Earthquake in Chile (Spanish: 03:34: Terremoto en Chile) is a 2011 Chilean film directed by Juan Pablo Ternicier and written by Mateo Iribarren. The film narrates three different stories based on the 2010 Chile earthquake.

The movie premiered in Dichato, Biobío Region, on February 27, 2011, exactly one year after the catastrophe, and was released throughout the rest of Chile on March 3. The first teaser for "03:34" was released on January 17, 2011.

Filming began in November 2010 in the same locations where the earthquake occurred, with the support of the National Council of Culture and the Arts and Carabineros de Chile, who helped with the recording in the affected zones. The movie had a budget of $1.4 million, and all profits from the movie were to be donated towards the construction of schools in the most affected coastal zones.

== Plot ==
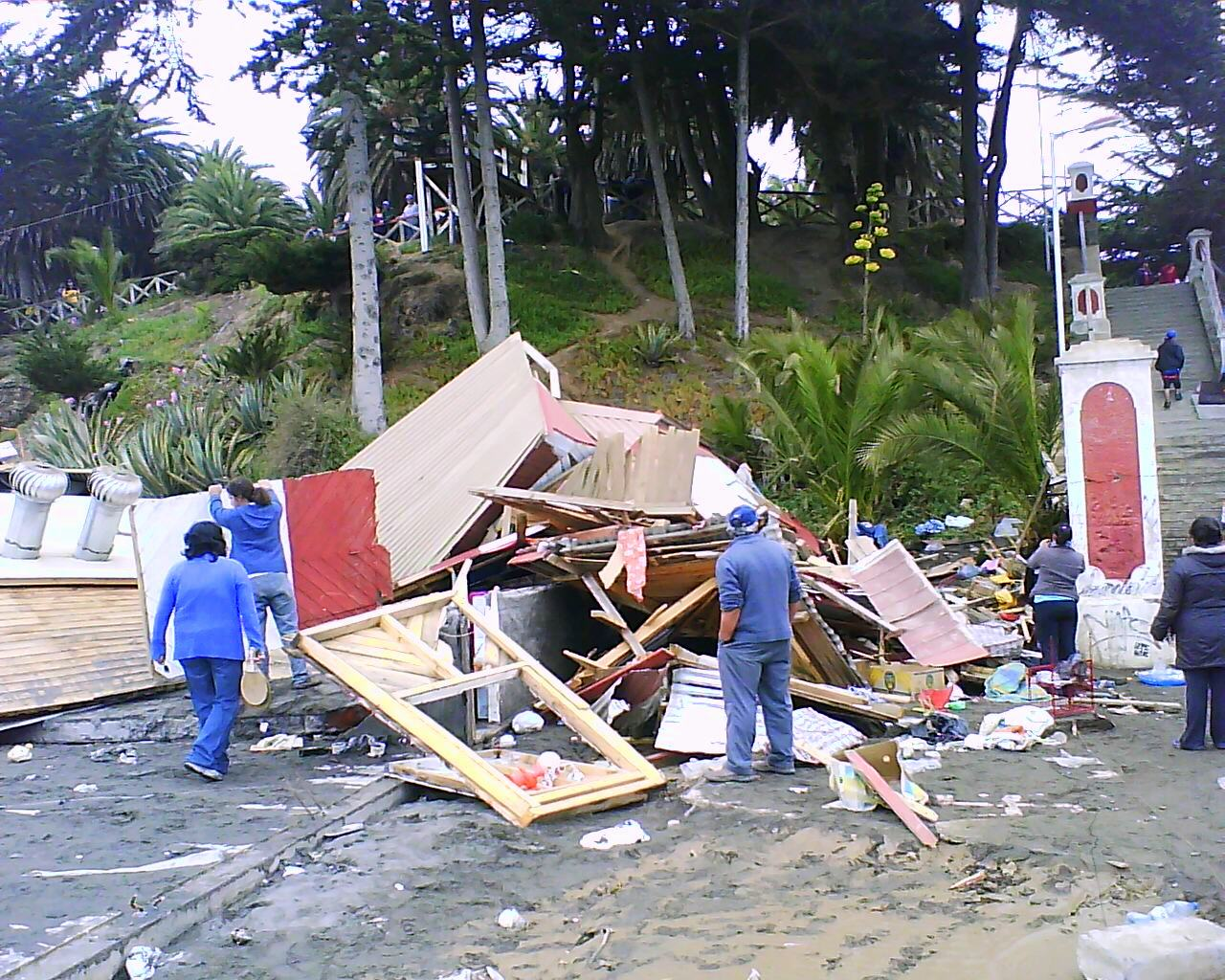
Earthquake, and tsunami-destroyed kiosks in Pichilemu, where part of the film is set.

The movie portrays three stories of people who were affected by the disaster.

The first story follows a woman (Andrea Freund), who travels from Pichilemu in the O'Higgins Region to the devastated town of Dichato in the Biobío Region to find her sons, who were spending their vacation with their father Manuel (Marcelo Alonso) in the area.

The second story depicts the experience of a convict (Fernando Gómez-Rovira), who escapes from the Chillán Prison to Concepción because his daughter was in the Alto Río building, which collapsed during the earthquake.

The third story takes place in Dichato, where a group of young people (played by Loreto Aravena, Eduardo Paxeco, and Andrés Reyes) are enjoying their last day of vacation at a party when they experience the strong earthquake and tsunami that devastate the town.

== Cast ==
- Andrea Freund
- Marcelo Alonso
- Loreto Aravena
- Roberto Farías
- Hugo Medina
- Fernando Gómez-Rovira
- Eduardo Paxeco
- Andrés Reyes
- Gabriela Medina
- Berta Lasala
- Remigio Remedy
- María Paz Jorquera
- Jorge Alís
- Jose Luis Bouchon
- Nathalia Aragonese
- Claudio Castellón
- Ernesto Anacona
- Julio Fuentes
