= Ángel Negro =

- film poster
- Directed by: Jorge Olguín
- Written by: Jorge Olguín
- Produced by: Álvaro Fáez; Marcelo Rojas
- Starring: Álvaro Morales; Blanca Lewin; Andrea Freund
- Cinematography: Arnaldo Rodríguez
- Edited by: Max Cueto
- Music by: Juan Francisco Cueto
- Production companies: Angel Films Producciones; Sobras.com Producciones
- Distributed by: Troma Entertainment
- Release date: October 31, 2000
- Running time: 85 minutes
- Country: Chile
- Language: Spanish
- Budget: $25,000

Ángel Negro ("Dark Angel") is a 2000 Chilean slasher film written and directed by Jorge Olguín. Ángel Negro is the first Chilean horror film. After a mysterious accident, a group of friends is hunted down by a masked killer.

== Plot ==
The film depicts the story of Gabriel Echeverría, who, years after graduating from high school with his group of friends, learns that his former classmate Rafael has been brutally murdered. His widow is Gabriel's old friend Carolina Ferrer, whose husband Miguel was also recently killed. Gabriel begins having visions of his ex-girlfriend Ángel, who died ten years earlier at Piedra Feliz, a cliff infamous for the numerous suicides that have occurred there. Gabriel fears that the murders are connected to Ángel's death and that Carolina and Lorena, another one of his friends, could be the next targets. Gabriel discloses to Carolina the truth about his relationship with Ángel and shows her footage of Miguel raping Ángel after she discovered that he was only with her as part of a bet.

== Cast ==
- Álvaro Morales as Gabriel Echeverría
- Andrea Freund as Carolina viuda de Ferrer
- Blanca Lewin as Angel Cruz
- Juan Pablo Bastidas as Miguel Ferrer

== Production ==
Director Jorge Olguín wanted to make a homage to his favorite filmmakers, John Carpenter and Dario Argento. He decided to use all the standard giallo and slasher film tropes and cliches but with a unique Latin American flavor. Shooting took 20 days and was in Santiago.

== Release ==
Ángel Negro premiered on October 31, 2000, and it entered wide release in Chile on November 1, 2000. Troma Entertainment released it on DVD in the United States on October 25, 2003.

== Reception ==
Mike Long of DVD Talk rated it 1/5 stars and called it "dull, pointless, and unoriginal." David Johnson of DVD Verdict wrote that the film "is not piss-poor by any means, but it certainly won't change the way you look at horror movies."
