= Descendents (2008 film) =

- Solos
- Directed by: Jorge Olguín
- Written by: Jorge Olguín; Carolina García
- Produced by: Ana María Aguilar; Monserrat Astudillo
- Starring: Camille Lynch; Karina Pizarro; Christobal Barra; Carolina Andrade
- Cinematography: Juan Carpintero
- Edited by: Jorge Olguín; Guillermo Perez
- Music by: Claudio Perez
- Production companies: Screen Media Films; OlguinFilms; Chile Films; Sleeping Giant Entertainment
- Distributed by: Lionsgate Films
- Release date: April 7, 2008 (BIFFF)
- Running time: 74 minutes
- Country: Chile
- Language: English
- Budget: $100,000–$200,000

Descendents (also Solos in Chile) is a 2008 Chilean experimental horror film directed by Jorge Olguín, written by Carolina García and Olguín, and starring Camille Lynch. Lynch plays a young child who attempts to cross a land divided by brutal fights between the military and roving zombies.

== Plot ==
After a virus causes a zombie apocalypse, the military engages in brutal warfare against the roving zombies. Young mutants, who are immune to both the virus and the zombies, band together and attempt to escape the violence. Camille, the oldest child, expects to find a safe haven by the coast, and she leads several younger children through the land, where they must avoid bloodthirsty soldiers who mistake them for zombies. During the journey, flashbacks reveal background information about Camille and her mother.

== Cast ==
- Camille Lynch as Camille
- Karina Pizarro as Camille's mother
- Christobal Barra as boy
- Carolina Andrade as girl

== Production ==
Director Jorge Olguín shot Descendents while he was waiting for his next project, Caleuche: The Call of the Sea. His first English-language film, Olguín cast the film after looking for English-speaking actors for Caleuche. It was shot in seven days. Descendents is billed as the first Chilean zombie film.

== Release ==
Descendents premiered at the Brussels International Fantastic Film Festival on April 7, 2008. It received a theatrical release in Chile on October 16, 2008. Lionsgate Films released it on DVD in the United States on May 15, 2012.

== Reception ==
William Harrison of DVD Talk rated it 1/5 stars and wrote, "Repetitive, confusing and boring, Descendents is a waste of time." Gordon Sullivan of DVD Verdict called it "an impressive zombie flick" whose execution does not live up to its ambition or vision. Devon Ashby of CraveOnline rated it 2/10 stars and wrote, "Descendents' awkwardly unconventional execution and overreliance on child performers gives it an unfinished, diffuse quality that tragically disappoints rather than inspiring." Marc Patterson of Brutal As Hell called it "smartly made and quite stunning to watch" but said that it eventually becomes boring, unsubtle, and superficial. Peter Dendle wrote, "Despite its limitations, the movie uniquely situates the infected against an unforgettable, anemic world, one saturated throughout with sickness and veiled in pale ochre."

== See also ==
- List of killer octopus films
