= Matt Cavenaugh =

American actor (born 1978)

- Born: William Matthew Cavenaugh; May 31, 1978 (age 48); Jonesboro, Arkansas, U.S.
- Education: Ithaca College (BFA)
- Occupations: Actor, singer
- Years active: 1997–present
- Spouse: Jenny Powers (m. 2009)
- Children: 3

William Matthew Cavenaugh (born May 31, 1978) is an American tenor and stage, film, and television actor. His most well known role was his leading performance as Tony in the 2009 Broadway revival of West Side Story.

== Early life and education ==
Cavenaugh was born in Jonesboro, Arkansas. He graduated from Ithaca College with a BFA in 2001.

== Career ==
Cavenaugh made his film debut in Little Monsters as a child actor, and has more recently played starring roles on Broadway and Off Broadway. He played Jimmy in the national tour of Thoroughly Modern Millie and Tony in the revival of West Side Story at the Palace Theatre on Broadway from February 23, 2009 – December 13, 2009.

== Personal life ==
Cavenaugh married actress Jenny Powers on August 23, 2009 at the Gate of Heaven Catholic Church in Boston, Massachusetts.

== Filmography ==
=== Film ===
Year	Title	Role	Notes
1989	Little Monsters	Little Monster	
2003	Sexual Dependency	Sean	
2004	Standing Ovations 2	Performer	
2009	New Brooklyn	Brad Steward	

=== Television ===
Year	Title	Role	Notes
2005	One Life to Live	Mark Solomon	Recurring role
2006–2007	As the World Turns	Adam Munson	39 episodes
2011	Law & Order: Criminal Intent	Brice Calder	Episode: "Icarus"
2011	Submissions Only	Chace Ryan	Episode: "The Miller/Hennigan Act"

== Theatre credits ==
- The Pirates of Penzance - Samuel (1997)
- Babes in Arms - Val (1999)
- A Little Night Music - Henrik (2000)
- Ragtime - Younger Brother (2001)
- Strike Up the Band - Cast Member (2002)
- Footloose - Ren (2002)
- The Picture of Dorian Gray - Dorian Gray (2002)
- Thoroughly Modern Millie - Jimmy Smith (2003 National Tour)
- Urban Cowboy - Bud (2003 Broadway)
- Palm Beach, The Screwball Musical - Lance (2005, La Jolla Playhouse)
- Carousel - Billy Bigelow (2005, Benedum Center)
- The Secret Garden - Ian Shaw (2005, Manhattan Center)
- Grey Gardens - Joseph Patrick Kennedy, Jr., Jerry Torre (2006 Off-Broadway)
- Anything Goes - Billy Crocker (2006, Williamstown Theatre Festival)
- Grey Gardens - Joseph Patrick Kennedy, Jr., Jerry Torre (2006 Broadway)
- A Catered Affair - Ralph Halloran (2008 Broadway)
- West Side Story - Tony (2009 Broadway)
- It's a Bird, It's a Plane, It's Superman! - Superman/Clark Kent (2010 Dallas)
- Death Takes a Holiday - Eric Fenton (2011 Off-Broadway)
- Ragtime - Henry Ford (2013)
