= El Manzano (prison) =

Prison in Chile

Coordinates: 36.803237°S 73.02201°W

Cárcel El Manzano
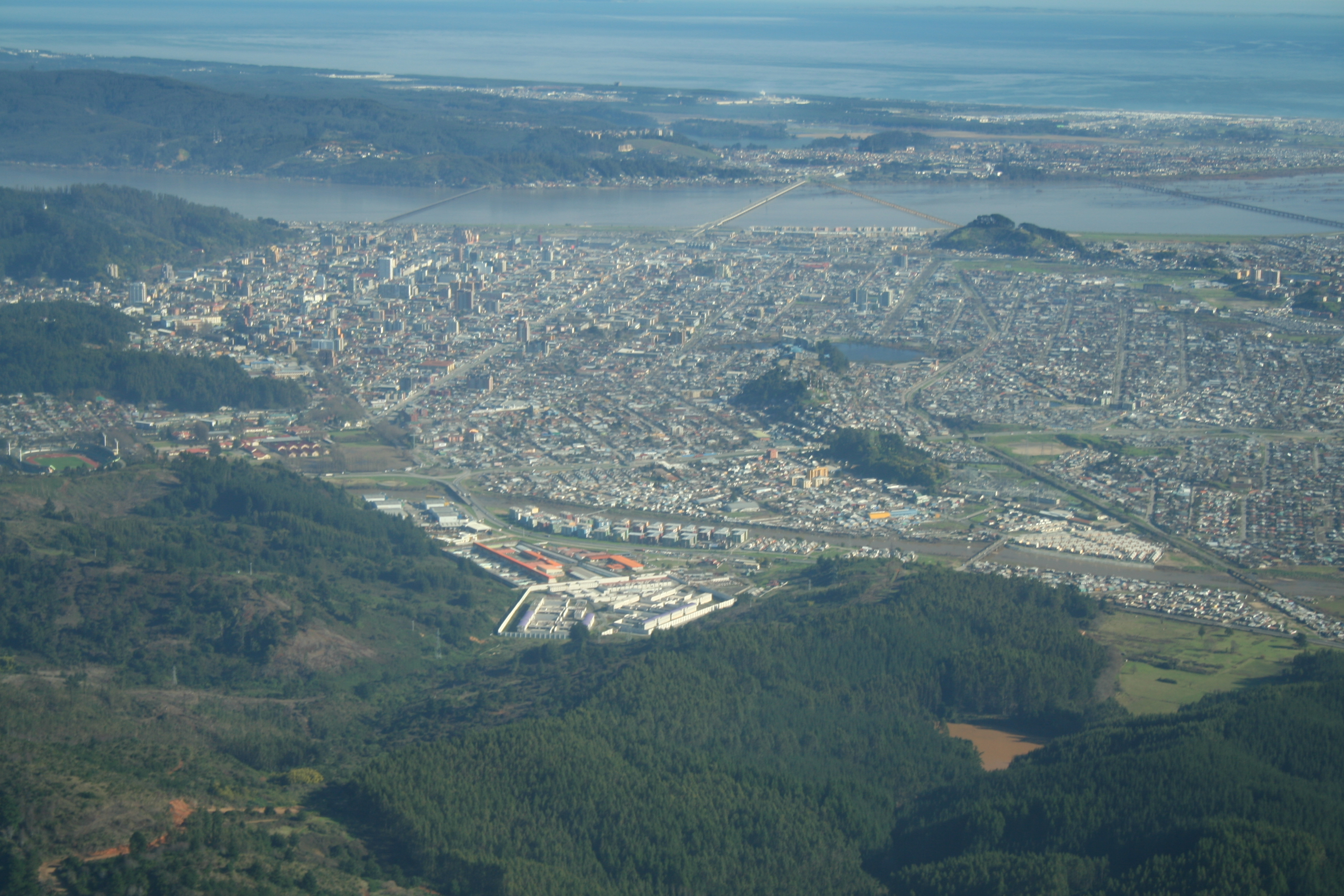
- The prison facility is visible in the lower center portion of the image.
- Interactive map of Cárcel El Manzano
- Location: Concepción, Chile

El Manzano is a prison in the city of Concepción, Chile.

After the 2010 Chile earthquake, a prison riot began following a failed escape attempt by inmates. Different parts of the prison were set on fire and the riot was only controlled after the guards chot into the air and received help from military units.

On 3 March 2005, it was reported that guards had found a 7-meter long tunnel made by inmates.
