= Alto Río building collapse =

Building collapse

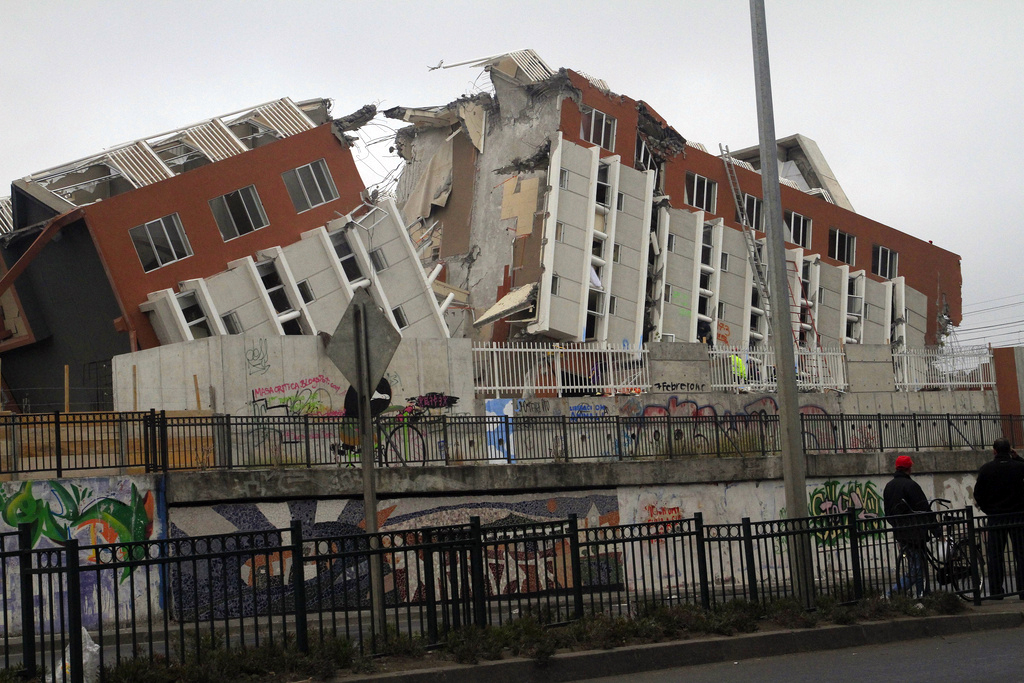
- Date: 27 February 2010
- Time: 3:34 a.m. (UTC-3)
- Location: Concepción, Biobío Region, Chile
- Type: Structural failure
- Cause: 2010 Chile earthquake
- Deaths: 8
- Injuries: 70+

The Alto Río building (Spanish: Edificio Alto Río) was a 14-story apartment building located on Los Carrera Avenue, in the city of Concepción, Chile. Just one year after its completion, the building collapsed and broke in half due to the 2010 Chile earthquake.

== Collapse ==
Alto Río was the only multi-story building that suffered a near-complete collapse during the 8.8 earthquake that hit central Chile on 27 February 2010. At 3:34 a.m. local time (6:34 a.m UTC), the full structure broke in two and trapped most of its residents inside. The official final death toll counted 8 people, while nearly other 70 were rescued alive with injuries.

In January 2011, the former residents were allowed to enter and recover some of their personal belongings. Many stated they could take some valued objects and others were able to retrieve their cars..The overturned and fractured Alto Rio apartment building in Concepcion became the emblematic image of the Chile earthquake of 2010.

=== Investigation ===
The legal case was known as "Alto Río Case" and lasted for over two years, including four months of hearings, thus becoming the longest trial process after the 2000-2005 Chilean Judicial Reform. The defendants were: construction company Socovil's CEO Juan Ignacio Ortigosa, sales manager Felipe Parra, engineers René Petinelli and Pedro Ortigosa, project manager Ricardo Baeza, construction director Mario Valeria and construction managers Héctor Torres and José Luis Paredes. On 31 October 2012, all but engineer Petinelli were acquitted. The ruling caused public outrage, even among governmental authorities and parliament members.
