= Patricia López =

Chilean actress and singer (born 1977)

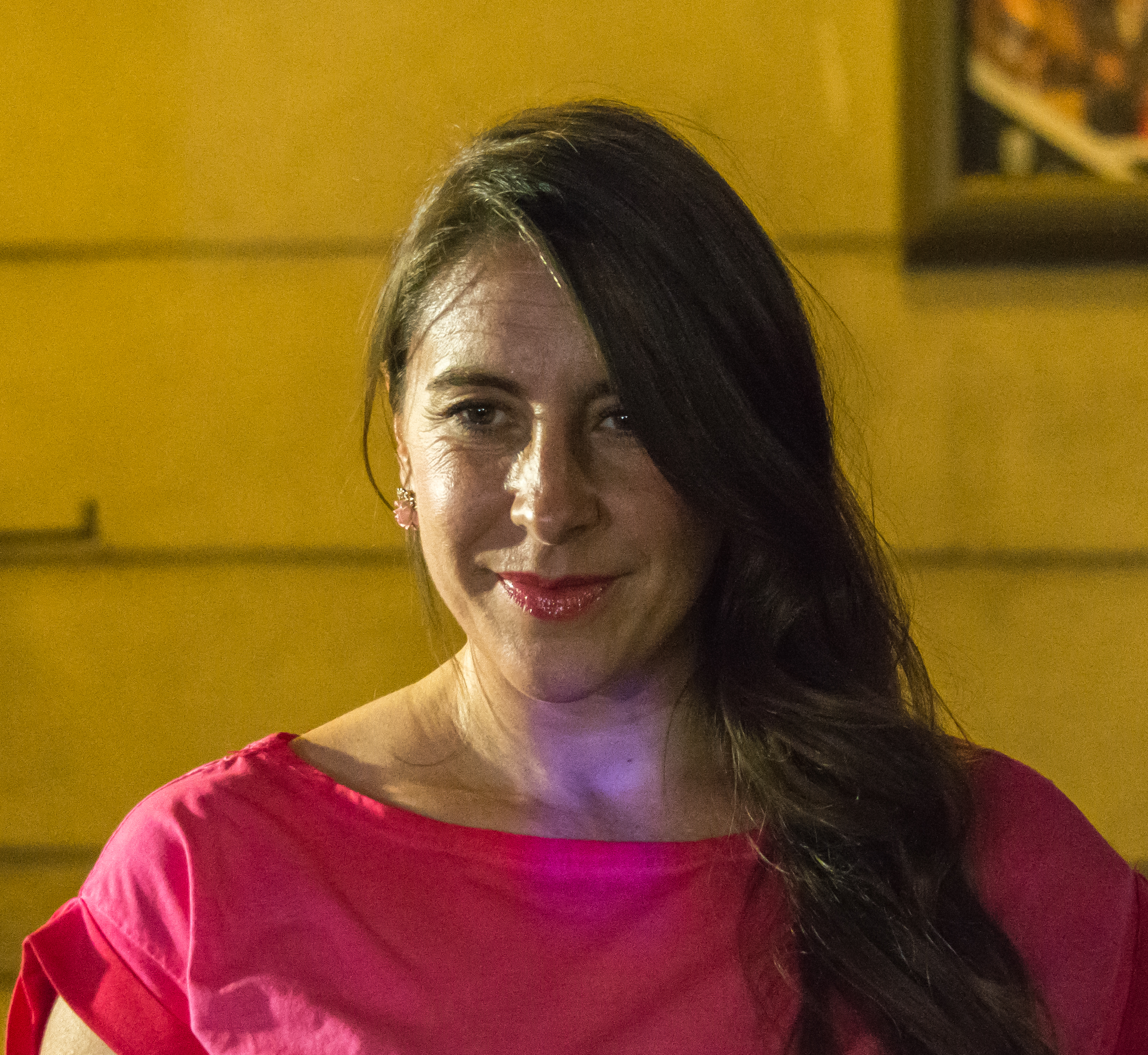

Patricia Javiera López Menadier (born July 10, 1977 Santiago) is a Chilean actress, singer and beauty pageant titleholder. In 2012, she joined the cast of Reserva de familia.

== Filmography ==
- 1999, El desquite
- 2001, La fiebre del loco
- 2002, Sangre Eterna
- 2004, La Sagrada Familia
- 2009, Grado 3
- 2011, Baby Shower

== Telenovelas ==
- 1999, Aquelarre
- 2000, Santo Ladrón
- 2001, Amores de Mercado
- 2002, Purasangre
- 2003, Pecadores Miranda Ahumada
- 2005, Los Capo Marietta Ragano
- 2006, Cómplices Alejandra Loyola
- 2007, Corazón de María
- 2008, El Señor de la Querencia
- 2009, ¿Dónde está Elisa?
- 2010, Feroz Kiara Montero
- 2012, Reserva de familia
- 2013, Socias
- 2015, Veinteañero a los 40 - Janin Díaz

== Theatre ==
- La viuda de Apablaza (1999)
- Yo solo soy casualmente yo (2000)
- Confesiones (2000)
- Bukowsky, Bukowsky (2001)
- Roberto Zucco (2006)
- Matanza en zapallar (2008)
- Apoteosis Final: BBB Up (2009)
- Los 39 escalones (2013)
- Tres Tristes Tigres (2015-2016)
- Pobre Ines Sentada Ahi (2016)
