= Machali =

Coordinates: 19°36′N 80°05′E

- Village
- Interactive map of Machali
- Country: India
- State: Karnataka
- District: Belgaum
- Talukas: Khanapur

Languages
  - Official: Kannada
- Time zone: UTC+5:30 (IST)

Machali is a village in Belgaum district in Karnataka, India.
