= Jorge Olguín (director) =

Chilean film director

- Born: 1973 or 1974 (age 52–53)
- Occupation: Film director
- Known for: Sangre Eterna (Eternal Blood)

Jorge Olguín is a Chilean director who works mainly in fantasy and horror.

== Career ==
His first film, Ángel Negro, was a student film. Olguín filmed it while he studied cinema in the University with a budget of $25,000. This film was commercially released in 2000 and attracted attention in Chile by its unusual advertising campaign. The film, a mixture of slasher and giallo, was selected for Montreal's Fantasia Festival, Portugal's Fantasporto, and Catalonia's Sitges Film Festival, among others. Angel Negro was released on DVD in the United States by Troma Entertainment.

In 2002, Olguín released Sangre Eterna, a vampire film with a psychological plot that involves the world of Goth subculture and role playing games. Variety wrote that Sangre Eterna became a cult film and one of the highest grossing Latin American horror films. Later, it received the Prize for the Best Special Effects in the Málaga Film Festival, Prize for the Best Actor and Best FX Make-Up at Screamfest Horror Film Festival. Soon it film was released on DVD in the USA by Fangoria Films under the title Eternal Blood. This film drew the attention of director Guillermo del Toro. In 2008, while Olguín waited for his next film to come together, he shot Solos in seven days for $200,000. In 2012, it was released in the United States as Descendents. Caleuche: The Call of the Sea, his fourth film, was budgeted at $2 million and was picked up by Buena Vista International. Whispers in the Forest, Chile's first 3D feature, cost $500,000.

== Filmography ==
- Ángel Negro (2000)
- Eternal Blood (Sangre Eterna) (2002)
- Descendents (Solos) (2008)
- Caleuche: The Call of the Sea (2012)
- Whispers in the Forest (2014)
- The house (2019)
- Analogues (2023)
