= Bélgica Castro =

Chilean actress (1921–2020)

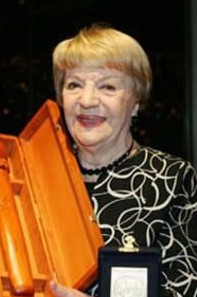
- Castro in November 2009
- Born: Bélgica Castro Sierra; 6 March 1921; Concepción, Chile
- Died: 6 March 2020 (aged 99); Santiago, Chile
- Occupation: Actress
- Years active: 1939–2020
- Spouses: Domingo Tessier (divorced); Alejandro Sieveking (m. 1961; died 2020)
- Children: Leonardo Mihovilovic
- Awards: National Prize for Performing and Audiovisual Arts (1995); Altazor Award (2008, 2009, 2013)

Bélgica Castro Sierra ([ˈbelxika ˈkastɾo]; 6 March 1921 – 6 March 2020) was a Chilean stage, film, and television actress.

During her career she participated in more than 100 plays. She also acted in numerous Chilean films, including Hollywood es así (1944) by Jorge Délano and The Good Life (2008) by Andrés Wood. Under the direction of Ricardo Larraín she participated in Chile puede (2008), where she played a Russian scientist, a role for which she received the Paoa Award of the Viña del Mar International Film Festival for Best National Lead Actress and the APES Award for Best Supporting Actress. She also won the 1995 National Prize for Performing and Audiovisual Arts.

== Biography ==
Bélgica Castro, the daughter of Spanish anarchist parents, was born in Concepción and studied in Temuco. In 1940, she traveled to Santiago to study Spanish at the Pedagogical Institute of the University of Chile, where she joined the theater group Cadip. Then, along with other young artists led by Pedro de la Barra, she founded the Experimental Theater of the University of Chile in 1941. Hired by the BBC, she spent 1949 in London.

Having retired from the Theater of the University of Chile, she and Alejandro Sieveking formed their own company, El Teatro del Ángel. Subsequently, from 1974 until the end of 1984, they settled in Costa Rica, where she also achieved notable successes with the same company.

She was a teacher of the history of theater at the University of Chile's Theater School for 14 years, and of acting at the Theater School of the Catholic University of Chile and at the University of Costa Rica.

In 1995, she was awarded the National Prize for Performing and Audiovisual Arts. In 2001, she received the APES Award granted by the Association of Entertainment Journalists for her career. In 2007 she was nominated for the Altazor Award for Best Actress in Theater for her role in the play Cabeza de ovni, and won it in 2013 for Todo pasajero debe descender.

She acted in numerous Chilean films, most notably Hollywood es así (1944) by Jorge Délano; El final del juego (1970) by Luis Cornejo; Little White Dove (1973), Days in the Country (2004) and the miniseries La Recta Provincia (2007) by Raúl Ruiz; and El desquite (1999) and The Good Life (2008) by Andrés Wood. Under the direction of Ricardo Larraín she participated in Chile puede (2008), where she played a Russian scientist, a role for which she received the Paoa Award of the Viña del Mar International Film Festival for Best National Lead Actress and the APES Award for Best Supporting Actress.

For her role in the film La vida me mata, the debut of director Sebastián Silva, she won the 2008 Altazor Award for National Arts in the category Best Film Actress. In 2009, she received the same award for her role in Andrés Wood's The Good Life. In 2010, she returned to the big screen in the Sebastián Silva film Old Cats, along with her husband Alejandro Sieveking, Claudia Celedón, and Catalina Saavedra. Her lead role earned her the Best Actress award at the 16th Festivalisimo, the Ibero-Latin American Film Festival of Montreal, and a third Altazor for film acting.

Castro died on 6 March 2020, her 99th birthday, which fell one day after the death of her husband Alejandro Sieveking, who died at age 85 on 5 March.

== Filmography ==
=== Film ===
- Hollywood es así (1944)
- El final del juego (1970)
- Little White Dove (1973) – Abuela
- Sin ceder (1998)
- El hombre que imaginaba (1998)
- El desquite (1999) – Margarita
- Days in the Country (2004) – Paulita
- Life Kills Me (2007) – The Old Woman (The Death)
- Chile puede (2008)
- The Good Life (2008)
- Old Cats (2010) – Isidora
- Viejos amores (2016) – Herself
- Hecho bolsa (2019) – Mother

=== Television ===
- Juani en Sociedad
- La sal del desierto (1972) – Eduviges
- La Recta Provincia (2007) – Rosalba
- Litoral (2008) – Señora

== Awards ==
=== APES Awards ===
Year	Category	Production	Result	Ref.
2001	Career		Winner	
2008	Best Supporting Actress	Chile puede	Winner	

=== Altazor Awards ===
Year	Category	Production	Result	Ref.
2007	Best Theater Actress	Cabeza de Ovni	Nominated	
2008	Best Film Actress	La vida me mata	Winner	
2009	Best Film Actress	The Good Life	Winner	
2013	Best Theater Actress	Todo pasajero debe descender	Winner	
2013	Best Film Actress	Old Cats	Winner	

=== Other awards ===
- 1995, National Prize for Performing and Audiovisual Arts
- 1999, Rectoral Distinction Medal of the University of Chile
- 2002, Professor Pedro de la Barra Distinction Medal of Cultural Merit
- 2008, Viña del Mar International Film Festival Paoa Award
- 2010, Pedro Sienna Award for Best Lead Actress in Old Cats
- 2015, UMCE Armando Rubio Culture Prize
- 2016, La Serena Film Festival Award for Best National Career
- 2016, Pablo Neruda Order of Artistic and Cultural Merit
- 2017, Distinguished Public Person Medal from the Municipality of Providencia
