= Helga y Flora =

Chilean television series

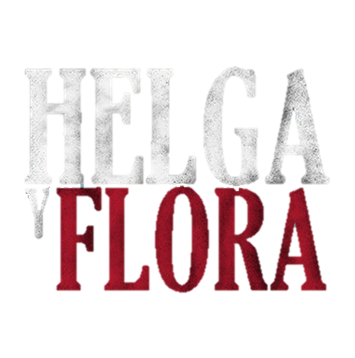
- Genre: Police procedural; Mystery; Drama
- Created by: Omar Saavedra Santis
- Written by: Omar Saavedra Santis; Luis Emilio Guzmán; Felipe Gómez; Iván Maureira
- Directed by: Christian Aspée
- Starring: Catalina Saavedra; Amelia Kassai; Alejandro Sieveking; Tiago Correa
- Country of origin: Chile
- Original language: Spanish
- No. of seasons: 1
- No. of episodes: 10

Production
- Executive producer: Daniela Salazar
- Production location: Isla Grande de Tierra del Fuego
- Camera setup: Multi-camera
- Production company: Suricato Films

Original release
- Network: Canal 13
- Release: April 25 – June 27, 2020

Helga y Flora (English: Helga and Flora) is a Chilean television drama series created and written by Omar Saavedra Santis, produced by Suricato for the Chilean channel Canal 13. It premiered on April 25, 2020. The series is set in the fields of Chilean Patagonia in the 1930s and runs through different narrative arcs in the social context of the time, in which women recently have labor and political rights.

It stars Catalina Saavedra, Amalia Kassai, and Alejandro Sieveking, the secondary performance of Tiago Correa, Alessandra Guerzoni, Ernesto Meléndez, Daniela Lhorente, Hernán Contreras, Geraldine Neary, among other actors.

The series was awarded CLP$485,426,640 from the funds of the Consejo Nacional de Televisión de Chile in 2016. The recordings began on March 9 and were paused in May 2018, due to the weather conditions in the Magallanes Region. They were then resumed in November to culminate in full on December 14, 2018.

== Plot ==
The story of Helga Gunkel (Amalia Kassai) and Flora Gutiérrez (Catalina Saavedra), the first women of the Chilean tax police. Both are sent on their first mission: to travel to Kerren, a ranch on the Isla Grande de Tierra del Fuego, in order to investigate the theft of Sigfried, a fine-blooded horse owned by Don Raymond Gamper (Alejandro Sieveking), a powerful rancher of German origin, owner of everything and everyone, and about whom the Government of Chile suspects that it may be helping Nazi Germany.

However, this event opens the floodgate to a whole world of mysteries, secrets and crossed stories in an inhospitable land. This apparent simple case hides a criminal who has returned to the town for revenge, initiating a series of other crimes that the people prefer to ignore but for our investigators it is transformed into a mysterious puzzle of intrigues that must be solved at the risk of losing their own lives.

== Cast ==
- Alejandro Sieveking as Mr. Raymond Gamper, German farmer, founder of Kerren.
- Catalina Saavedra as Flora Gutiérrez, police woman sent to Kerren.
- Amalia Kassai as Helga Gunkel, young researcher sent to Kerren.
- Hernán Contreras es David Acevedo, young inmate.
- Tiago Correa as Zacarías Llancaqueo, sergeant.
- Ernesto Meléndez as Ezequiel Ligman, Kerren Foreman.
- Daniela Lhorente as Úrsula Millán, Gamper's housekeeper.
- Alessandra Guerzoni as Clara, owner of the "Hotel Ñuble".
- Geraldine Neary as Eduvigis Carimán.
- Giordano Rossi as Gabriel Gamper, Mr. Gamper's Son.
- Aldo Parodi as Remigio
- Mario Ossandón as Alexander Nestroy, Mr. Gamper's Personal Physician.
- Daniel Antivilo as Atilio, Personal Physician.
- Juan Carlos Maldonado as Attaché
- Ernesto Gutiérrez as Aliaga, inspector.
- Isidora Loyola as Rosario
- Lisandro Cabascango as Ramón.
