= Crystal Fairy & the Magical Cactus =

Crystal Fairy & The Magical Cactus
- Theatrical release poster
- Directed by: Sebastián Silva
- Written by: Sebastián Silva
- Produced by: Juan de Dios Larraín; Pablo Larraín
- Starring: Michael Cera; Gaby Hoffmann
- Cinematography: Cristián Petit-Laurent
- Edited by: Diego Macho; Sebastián Silva; Sofia Subercaseaux
- Music by: Pedropiedra
- Production companies: Content Media; Diroriro; Fábula
- Distributed by: IFC Films
- Release dates: 17 January 2013 (Sundance); 14 April 2014
- Running time: 99 minutes
- Country: Chile
- Languages: English; Spanish
- Box office: $223,821

Crystal Fairy & The Magical Cactus (Crystal Fairy & The Magical Cactus and 2012 as presented onscreen) is a 2013 Chilean adventure comedy film written and directed by Sebastián Silva. The film stars Michael Cera and Gaby Hoffmann.

At the film's Sundance premiere, Silva said that his film, which is based on a real-life encounter, is "about the birth of compassion in someone's life." The film received positive reviews from critics.

== Plot ==
Jamie, a self-absorbed young American traveling in Chile, is eager to explore the mysteries of the San Pedro cactus, a local hallucinogen. However, in a moment of indiscretion, he invites the eccentric "Crystal Fairy", another young American, to join him and his three Chilean companions, who are also seeking the magical herb to varying degrees. Much to everyone's dismay, the New Age-obsessed Crystal Fairy, now dubbed "Crystal Hairy", joins them on their road trip, and her presence soon tests everyone's patience. Despite a hasty theft to acquire the desired plant, they all have heartfelt experiences under its psychotropic influence on a remote deserted beach, which brings them closer together. By the end, they become more sympathetic and tolerant of each other's individual personalities.

== Cast ==
- Michael Cera as Jamie
- Gaby Hoffmann as Crystal Fairy
- Juan Andrés Silva as Champa
- José Miguel Silva as Lel
- Agustín Silva as Pilo
- Sebastián Silva as Lobo
- Sol Squire as Whale expert
- Mark Grattan as Whale Expert
- Nancy Castillo as Grocery Store Saleslady
- Graciela Gonzalez Cruz as Mrs. Pachita
- Franco as San Pedro cactus

== Production ==
Michael Cera was in Chile learning Spanish for Magic Magic and had been living with the Silva boys for months when Gaby Hoffmann arrived. Sebastián Silva had given her a brief character description during a phone call about a week before she left for Chile. Hoffmann says, "And all he did was say, 'Go buy some books about 2012 and get on the plane.'" The actors spent a week in Santiago in pre-production living together at Silva's parents' house—where he had shot The Maid in 2009. The boys would sit out back playing guitar and singing songs. Hoffmann recalls hearing the music streaming through the open doors while Sebastián and Hoffmann would sit at a desk where she created all Crystal Fairy's drawings in the sketchbook she has in the film.

The titular character is based on a real person who was an influence on the director. The script was an outline with every scene including a moment that leads the actors to the next place. They didn't do any rehearsals in character, but since the boys had already been living together when Hoffmann arrived, her character's role as the outsider was easier to slip into. While shooting the scene of Crystal Fairy tripping, Hoffmann was actually under the influence of real psychedelics, saying "...I just knew it would be okay. My dose was weak, so I had to take a second one even though it was so revolting, but I really loved it. I was totally present in the experience of the making of the movie, and I felt like it was subtle enough that I could step in and out of it," Hoffmann said. "I never felt like, 'Oh my God, I’m tripping and I have to make a movie.' I felt like I could totally step out of it and be like, 'Okay, Sebastián, what's going on? What do we need to do?' And then I could step back into it and just go with it. And, you know, there's like hours and hours of footage that you don’t see because it was like a 10-hour trip and we were in that desert the whole time. It was great, but it was subtle."

== Release ==
Silva told the audience after the world premiere in Park City that Crystal Fairy was largely improvised. Distributed by IFC Films in North America, Crystal Fairy was released on 12 July 2013.

=== Critical reception ===
Crystal Fairy received generally positive reviews, currently holding an 80% "fresh" rating on Rotten Tomatoes, based on 82 reviews, with an average rating of 6.7/10. The site's consensus reads: "Slight and unpolished, The Crystal Fairy is held together with Sebastian Silva's assured direction and a pair of strong, committed performances from Michael Cera and Gaby Hoffman." On Metacritic, the film has a 67 out of 100 rating, based on 25 critics, indicating "generally favorable reviews".

Writing for The Village Voice, Alan Scherstul praises Cera's performance, writing, "Cera's a pleasure... There's a tender radiance to him here, and some string-bean clowning; at times, especially when he's playing a beatific high, he looks for all the world like Harpo Marx."

=== Accolades ===
The film received the Directing Award (World Cinema Dramatic) at the 2013 Sundance Film Festival.

== See also ==
- Cinema of Chile
- List of films featuring hallucinogens
