= Boris Quercia =

Chilean filmmaker

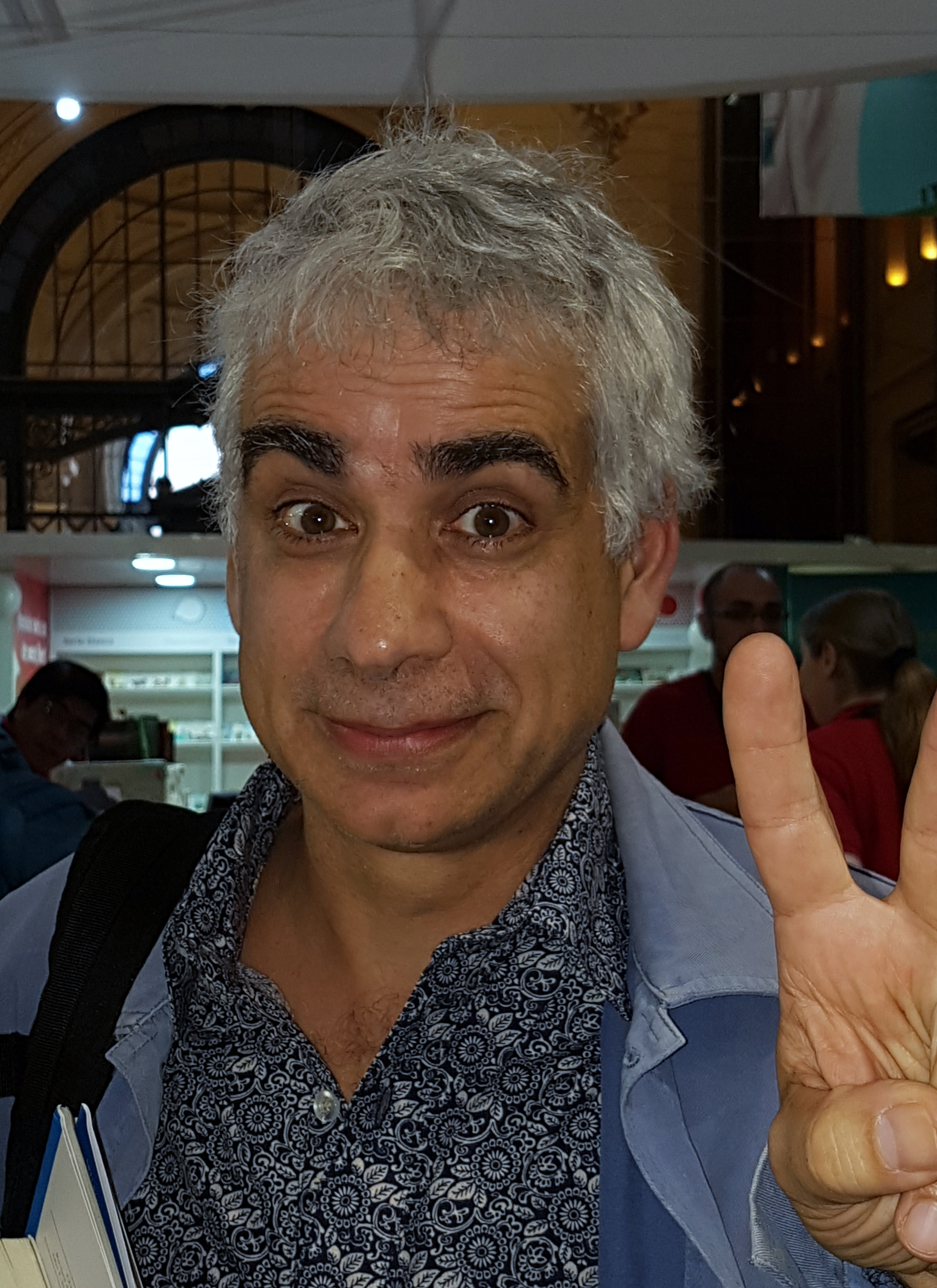
- November 2017
- Born: Boris Vincenzo Quercia Martinic; 31 August 1967 (age 59); Santiago, Chile
- Education: University of Chile
- Occupations: Actor, film and theater director, writer
- Awards: Altazor Award (2004–2005, 2009–2011)

Boris Quercia Martinic (born 31 August 1967) is a Chilean actor, director, writer, and producer. In theater, he stood out for his performance as Roberto Parra Sandoval in the acclaimed work La negra Ester by Andrés Pérez. As a filmmaker, his first feature film Sex with Love received several national and international awards. As a television director, Los 80 has become one of the most successful Chilean series since its premiere in 2008. And as a writer he has won the Grand Prix of Crime Fiction in France with his second novel, Perro muerto.

== Biography ==
The son of actor Benito Quercia, Boris studied acting at the University of Chile.

He is one of the founders of the Teatro Provisorio company, which later became the Gran Circo Teatro, directed by Andrés Pérez, and where he starred in the famed play La negra Ester. Later he joined the company Teatro Sombrero Verde, under the direction of Willy Semler.

His career as a film director began with the short film Ñoquis (1995), shot in 16 mm format, followed by El lanza (1997) in 35 mm. In 2000 he premiered L.S.D., the first Chilean film recorded in digital format. Three years later his first feature film, Sex with Love, was released, for which he won the Altazor Award as best director, as well as several other international awards for best film and direction. In 2006 he released his second feature film, El rey de los huevones. Quercia has been the screenwriter of all his films.

In television, he directed the first five seasons (2008–2012) of Los 80, which became one of the most successful series in Chile. He eventually decided to leave the series to be able to act in the Chilean adaptation of the successful Argentine series El hombre de tu vida. About this change, he says that when he was invited to participate in the casting he felt insecure because he had never played the role of conqueror. "Well, I did the casting the same and they liked it and they insisted that I do the character. The problem is that I was going to run into Los 80 and I had to make a very complicated decision, because I feel very good about that project. Somehow, I did five seasons as a director, I wrote several scripts, then it was complicated."

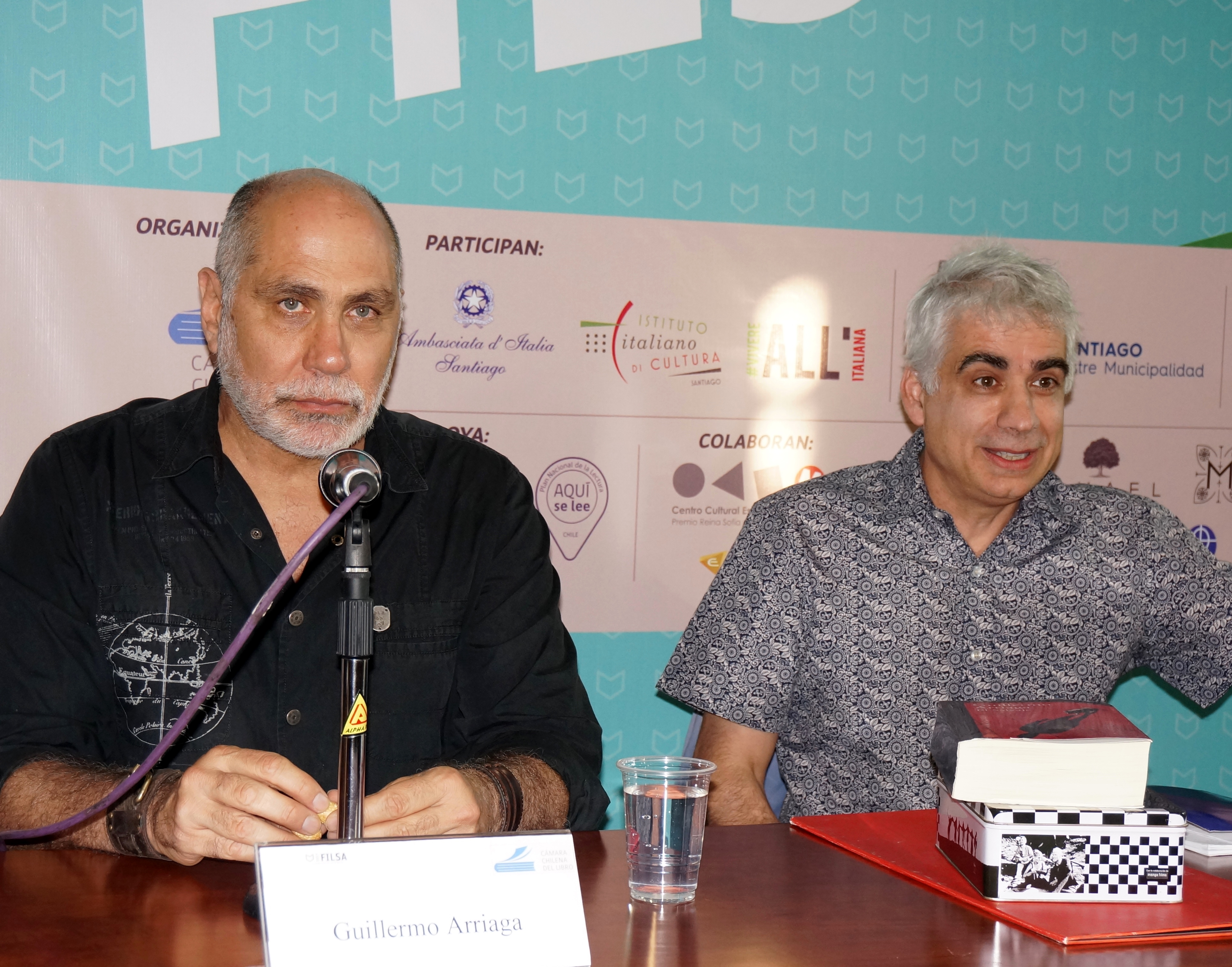
With Guillermo Arriaga at FILSA 2017

In 2010 Quercia published his first novel, Santiago Quiñones, tira. About his writing career, he said in 2013: "I have to find more spaces to devote myself to writing, but it is one of the things that I am most passionate about, and the experience of the novel was very good. I liked it a lot. Furthermore, I think it built a character that I could follow in other instances."

His second detective novel was released in France in 2015, Perro muerto (Tant de chiens, translated by Isabel Siklodi, Editorial Asphalte) starring the same character, PDI detective Santiago Quiñones. The following year, the book won that country's Grand Prix of Crime Fiction in the Foreign Novel category. This award, which in French is called Grand prix du roman noir, has been given annually since 2009 within the framework of the Beaune International Film Festival.

Quercia plans to create a trilogy with his detective, with whom he also wants to make a television series.

His brother Antonio is a director of photography, and they have worked together on several projects, including the series El hombre de tu vida.

== Works ==
=== Film ===
==== Actor ====
| Year | Film | Role |
|---|---|---|
| 1993 | Johnny 100 Pesos | Parker |
| 1994 | Pelea de fondo (short) | |
| 1995 | Vine a decirles que me voy (short) | |
| 1995 | Asfalto sin rumbo (short) | |
| 1996 | Mi último hombre | Rodrigo |
| 1997 | El lanza (short) | |
| 1997 | Historias de fútbol | René |
| 1998 | El hombre que imaginaba | Aníbal |
| 1999 | El desquite | Guillermo |
| 2000 | L.S.D | |
| 2000 | Coronation | Andrés joven |
| 2002 | La perra | |
| 2003 | Sex with Love | Emilio |
| 2006 | El rey de los huevones | Anselmo |
| 2008 | Chile puede | Guillermo |
| 2009 | Súper, todo Chile adentro | Hugo |

==== Director ====
- 1995 – Ñoquis (short)
- 1997 – El lanza (short)
- 2000 – L.S.D
- 2003 – Sex with Love
- 2006 – El rey de los huevones

==== Screenwriter ====
- 1995 – Ñoquis (short)
- 1997 – El lanza (short)
- 1999 – El desquite
- 2000 – L.S.D
- 2003 – Sex with Love
- 2006 – El rey de los huevones
- 2008 – Chile puede

==== Producer ====
- 1997 – El lanza (short)
- 2006 – Kiltro

=== Television ===
==== Actor ====
- 1991 – Ellas por ellas, as Manolo
- 1995 – Matías, el cuentacuentos, as Matías
- 1995 – El amor está de moda, as Domingo
- 1996 – Marrón Glacé, el regreso, as Ciro Chaquib
- 1996 – Vecinos puertas adentro, as Eugenio
- 1997 – Eclipse de luna, as Alejandro Llich
- 1998 – Amándote, as José Ignacio Bermúdez
- 1999 – Fuera de control, as Gino Mackenzie
- 2000 – Sabor a ti, as Fidel Castro Castro
- 2013 – El hombre de tu vida, as Hugo Canales
- 2015 – Entre caníbales, as Samuel Amerman

==== Director ====
- 2004 – Geografía del deseo
- 2007 – Huaiquimán y Tolosa
- 2008 – Los 80 – 1st season
- 2009 – Los 80 – 2nd season
- 2010 – Los 80 – 3rd season
- 2011 – Los 80 – 4th season
- 2012 – Los 80 – 5th season

=== Books ===
- 2008 – Sex with Love, screenwriter of the film of the same name (Ocho Libros Editores)
- 2014 – Santiago Quiñones, tira (Random House Mondadori; translated into French by Baptiste Chardon as Les Rues de Santiago)
- 2015 – Perro muerto (translated into French by Isabel Siklodi as Tant de chiens)

== Awards ==
| Year | Award | Category | Work | Result |
|---|---|---|---|---|
| 2004 | Altazor Award | Direction: Film | Sex with Love | Winner |
| 2005 | Altazor Award | Direction: Drama | Geografía del deseo | Winner |
| 2005 | Altazor Award | Screenwriter | Geografía del deseo | Winner |
| 2009 | Altazor Award | Direction: Drama | Los 80 | Winner |
| 2009 | Altazor Award | Screenwriter | Los 80 | Winner |
| 2010 | Altazor Award | Direction: Drama | Los 80 | Winner |
| 2011 | Altazor Award | Direction: Drama | Los 80 | Winner |
| 2016 | Grand Prix of Crime Fiction | Foreign Novel | Tant de chiens (Perro muerto) | Winner |
