= Alejandro Sieveking =

Chilean writer (1934–2020)

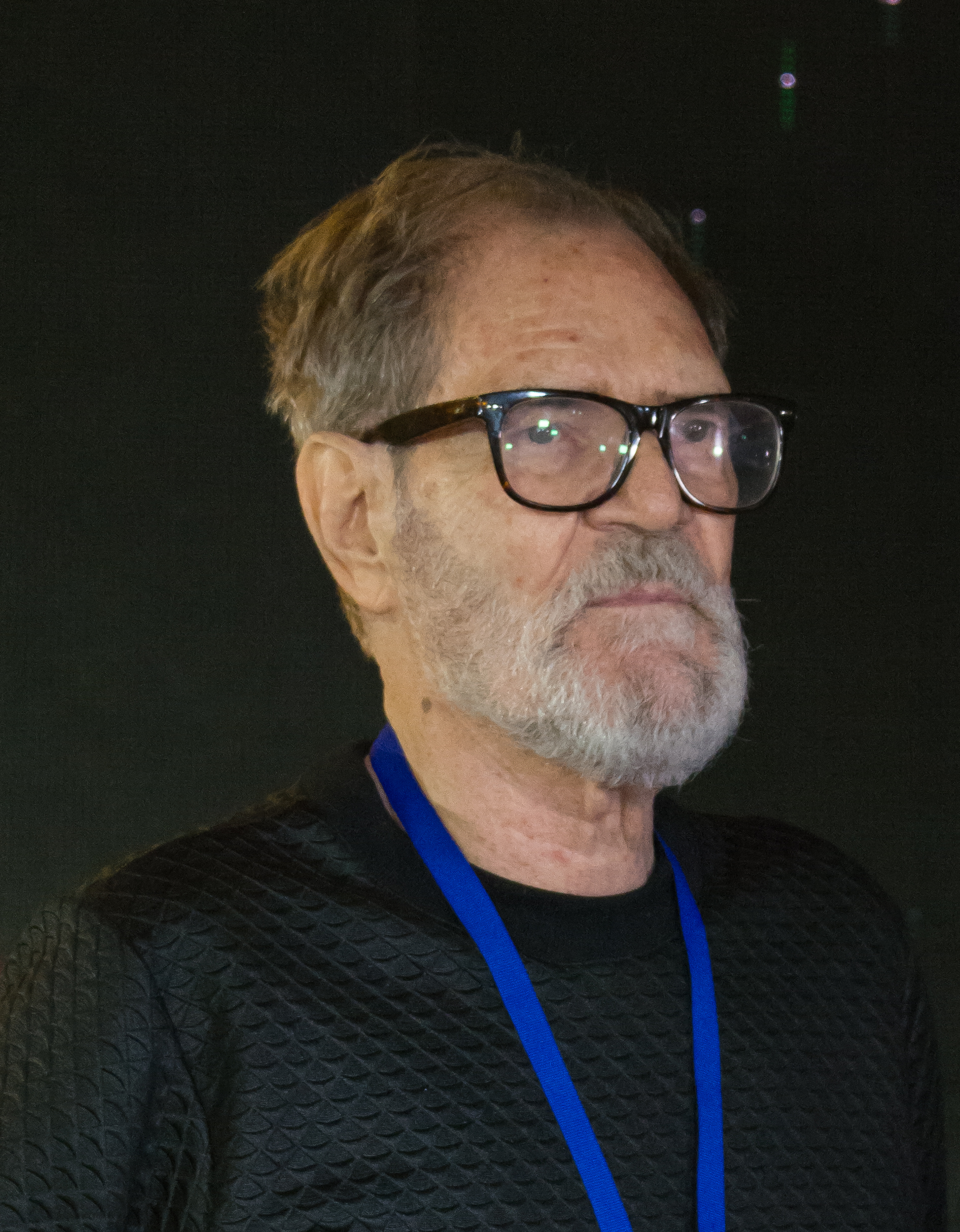
Alejandro Sieveking in 2019

Alejandro Sieveking Campano (5 September 1934 – 5 March 2020) was a Chilean playwright, theatre director and actor.

== Career ==
Sieveking was born in the Chilean city of Rengo (in the O'Higgins Region) on 5 September 1934. He performed as an actor on theatrical productions by Instituto del Teatro (Chile's Theatre Institute), Teatro de la Universidad Católica (the Catholic University Theatre), Teatro del Ángel (Angel Theatre Company) and Teatro Itinerante (Itinerant Theatre). He worked together with Víctor Jara on a number of theatrical and musical projects, including in his album: “La Población” – in which he co-wrote the song “Herminda de la Victoria” with Jara.

He was one of the founders of the Teatro del Ángel (Angel Theatre Company) in Chile and in Costa Rica, where he settled and worked as a political exile. In 1974 he was awarded the "Casa de Las Américas" prize for his Pequeños animales abatidos (Small game hunt). In 2017 he received Chile's National Prize for Performing and Audiovisual Arts. In the work of Sieveking one not only finds critical realism but also psychological and folkloric realism. “La remolienda” is one of the most important classics of Chilean theatrical comedy.In addition to holding university posts and being involved in television projects, he was vice-president of the Academia Chilena de Bellas Artes. (Chilean Academy of Fine Arts) He married actress Bélgica Castro in 1961. He died on 5 March 2020, and his wife the day after, on 6 March 2020.

== Filmography as actor ==
=== Films ===
- Play, directed by Alicia Scherson (2005)
- Life Kills Me, directed by Sebastián Silva (2007)
- Gatos viejos, directed by Sebastián Silva y Pedro Peirano (2010)
- Maknum Gonzalez, directed by George Vonknorring (2014)
- El club, directed by Pablo Larraín (2015)
- Fragmentos de Lucía, directed by Jorge Yacoman (2016)
- El invierno, directed by Emiliano Torres (2016)
- Los perros, directed by Marcela Said (2017)

=== Television series ===
- La sal del desierto (1972)
- Matilde dedos verdes (1988)
- Geografía del deseo (2004)
- JPT: Justicia para todos (2004)
- Heredia y asociados, directed by Arnaldo Valsecchi (2005)
- La recta provincia (2007)
- La canción de tu vida (2014)
- Bala Loca (2016)
- Helga y Flora (2020) - posthumus

== Playwrights ==
- Encuentro con las sombras, estrenada en 1955: Grupo de Arquitectura, Teatro Antonio Varas; gana el concurso de Teatro Aficionado 1955
- Una plaza sin pájaros, escrita en 1955
- El paraíso semiperdido, escrita en 1957 y estrenada al año siguiente: Grupo Los Feriantes, Teatro Talía
- La lección de la luna, escrita en 1957
- Mi hermano Cristián, escrita y estrenada en 1957, en el festival de los estudiantes de la Escuela de Teatro: 2º año de la Escuela de Teatro del ITUCII; Teatro Talía; dir.: Raúl Rivera
- El fin de febrero, escrita y estrenada en 1958: 1.er año de la Escuela de Teatro, Teatro Lexen 1958
- Cuando no está la pared, escrita y estrenada en 1958: 3.er año de la Escuela de Teatro, Teatro Lex
- La abuelita encantada, escrita en 1958
- La coronación de Pierrot, escrita en 1958
- Parecido a la felicidad, estrenada el 12 de septiembre de 1959: 4º año de la Escuela de Teatro. Teatro Lex; dir.: Víctor Jara
- Ánimas de día claro, escrita en 1959 y estrenada en diciembre de 1961 en la Sala Camilo Henríquez del teatro de la Universidad Católica; dir.: Víctor Jara.
- Honorato, el caballo del circo, 1959, dir.: Víctor Jara
- La madre de los conejos, escrita en 1959 y estrenada en 1961: Instituto del Teatro, Teatro Antonio Varas; dir.: Agustín Siré con Víctor Jara como asistente
- La cama en el medio de la pieza, escrita en 1961
- La gran batalla del living, escrita en 1961
- Dionisio (2 actos), estrenada en 1962: Teatro de Ensayo en el Teatro Camilo Henríquez
- Los hermanastros I y Los hermanastros II, escritas en 1963
- La remolienda, estrenada el 8 de octubre de 1965 en el Teatro Antonio Varas para la XXV temporada Oficial del Instituto de Teatro de la Universidad de Chile; dir.: Víctor Jara;
- Piel de asno, estrenada en 1964
- Tres tristes tigres, estrenada el 30 de junio de 1967: grupo El Cabildo, Teatro Talía; dir.: Nelson Villagra
- El Cheruve
- Peligro a 50 metros, escrita en colaboración con José Pineda, estrenada y escrita en 1968
- Todo se irá, se fue, se va al diablo, estrenada en 1968
- Una vaca mirando el piano, estrenada en 1968
- Las apariencias
- La mantis religiosa, estrenada en 1971
- La virgen del puño cerrado, escrita en 1973 y estrenada al año siguiente con el título de La virgen de la manita cerrada
- Cama de batalla (1973)
- Pequeños animales abatidos, escrita en 1974 en Costa Rica
- Volar con solo un ala, escrita en 1976 en Costa Rica
- El uno para el otro, escrita en 1979 en Costa Rica
- La diablada, escrita en 1981 en Costa Rica
- Manuel Leonidas Donaire y las cinco mujeres que lloraban por él, estrenada en 1984;
- La comadre Lola, estrenada en 1985
- Directo al corazón, estrenada en 1988
- Ingenuas palomas, estrenada el 12 de abril de 1989: Teatro Galpón de Los Leones; dir.: Alejandro Sieveking.
- El señor de los pasajes, estrenada en 1997
- La fiesta terminó (2005)
- Todo pasajero debe descender (2012)
- Pobre Inés sentada ahí (2016)
- Todos mienten y se van (2019)
