= Magic Magic =

Magic Magic may refer to:

- Magic Magic 3D, 2003 Indian 3D film
- Magic Magic (2013 film), Chilean-American film by Sebastián Silva
