= Mala Conducta =

Chilean telenovela

- Genre: Telenovela
- Directed by: Ricardo Vicuña
- Starring: Maria José Prieto; Willy Semler; Malucha Pinto; Tiago Correa; Ignacia Allamand
- Opening theme: "Incomprendido" (Croni-k, Yei and Eva Gómez)
- Country of origin: Chile
- Original language: Spanish

Production
- Producer: Javier Larenas Peñafiel

Original release
- Network: Chilevisión

Mala Conducta (English: Bad Conduct) is the name of the second telenovela produced by Chilevisión. It was first released in March 2008. It was made by Coca Gómez, and is produced by Javier Larenas and directed by Ricardo Vicuña. The basis of the telenovela is a school with low performance students finalizing their studies in a 2x1 school system. The first season of the series was given high ratings. The soundtrack was also given praise and was later released as an album.

The opening theme song is "Incomprendido", composed by Juan Andrés Ossandón.

== Cast ==
- Willy Semler - Pelayo Bobadilla
- Magdalena Max-Neef - Amelia Rodríguez
- María José Prieto - Flavia Inostroza
- Ignacia Allamand - Martina Bobadilla
- Tiago Correa - Felix Inostroza
- Rodrigo Bastidas - Patricio Cabezón
- Ana María Gazmuri - Georgette Ventura
- Marcela del Valle - Nicole Gallardo
- Jenny Cavallo - Carola Gallardo
- Alvaro Gómez - Rigoberto Bobadilla
- José Palma - Damián Bobadilla
- Juan Pablo Ogalde - Carlos Pelayo Bobadilla
- Javiera Hernández - Donatella Naranjo
- Andrés Arriola - Kurt Curiche
- Alex Walters - Mario Ricapito
- Malucha Pinto - Ninfa Acevedo
- María José Bello - Dominga Magallanes
- Emilio Edwards - Ignacio Magallanes/Iñaki Elometa
- Erto Pantoja - José María Magallanes
- Francisca Opazo - Valeska
- Ariel Levy - Pablo Parra (El Carpa)
- Pablo Macaya - Vladimir Cataldo
- Natalia Grez - María Chicharro
- Mauricio Diocares - Rolo Mendoza
- Francisco Pizarro - Diego Gutiérrez (El Rayo)
- Gonzalo Robles - Padre Plinio Bobadilla
- Tatiana Molina - Sabrina Sepúlveda
- Andrés Pozo - Marlon

== See also ==
- Don Amor - Canal 13
- Viuda Alegre - TVN

Preceded by Vivir con 10	Principal telenovela of Chilevisión; First semestre, 2008	Succeeded by
