= Old Cats =

- Theatrical film poster
- Spanish: Gatos viejos
- Directed by: Sebastián Silva
- Starring: Bélgica Castro; Claudia Celedón
- Release date: 8 October 2010 (NYFF)
- Running time: 89 minutes
- Country: Chile
- Language: Spanish

Old Cats (Spanish: Gatos viejos) is a 2010 Chilean drama film directed by Sebastián Silva.

== Plot ==
Isidora (Bélgica Castro) and Enrique (Alejandro Sieveking) are an elderly couple living in a central apartment in Santiago. Isidora has started exhibiting symptoms of Alzheimer's disease. Their daughter, Rosario (Claudia Celedón), comes to visit them with her girlfriend, Hugo (Catalina Saavedra), leading to a series of both humorous and dramatic situations.

== Cast ==
- Bélgica Castro as Isadora
- Claudia Celedón as Rosario
- Catalina Saavedra as Hugo
- Alejandro Sieveking as Enrique
- Alejandro Goic as Manuel
- Alicia Rodríguez as Valentina
- Diego Casanueva as Abeja
