= National Prize for Performing and Audiovisual Arts =

Chilean award

- To the person who has distinguished themselves by their achievements in the respective area of the arts
- Country: Chile
- First award: 1992
- Currently held by: Alejandro Sieveking

The National Prize for Performing and Audiovisual Arts (Spanish: Premio Nacional de Artes de la Representación y Audiovisuales) was created in Chile in 1992 under Law 19169 as one of the replacements of the National Prize of Art. It is granted "to the person who has distinguished themselves by their achievements in the respective area of the arts" (Article 8 of the aforementioned law). It is part of the National Prize of Chile.

The prize, which is awarded every two years, consists of a diploma, the sum of 6,576,457 pesos (US$8,665) which is adjusted every year, according to the previous year's consumer price index, and a pension of 20 monthly tax units (approximately US$1,600).

== Winners ==
Year	Artist	Age	Profession	Delivered by
1993	Jorge Díaz	63	Playwright	
1995	Bélgica Castro	74	Actress	
1997	Raúl Ruiz	56	Film director	
1999	María Cánepa	78	Actress	José Pablo Arellano
2001	Malucha Solari	81	Ballerina	
2003	Marés González	78	Actress	Sergio Bitar
2005	Fernando González Mardones		Theater director	
2007	Gustavo Meza		Theater director and playwright	Yasna Provoste
2009	Ramón Núñez Villarroel	68	Theater director	Mónica Jiménez
2011	Juan Radrigán	74	Playwright	Carolina Schmidt
2013	Egon Wolff	87	Playwright	Carolina Schmidt
2015	Héctor Noguera	78	Actor and theater director	Adriana Delpiano
2017	Alejandro Sieveking	82	Playwright	Adriana Delpiano
