= Sex with Love =

2003 film by Boris Quercia

Sexo con Amor
- English-language poster
- Directed by: Boris Quercia
- Written by: Boris Quercia
- Produced by: Diego Izquierdo
- Starring: Sigrid Alegría; Álvaro Rudolphy; Patricio Contreras; María Izquierdo
- Distributed by: 20th Century Fox
- Release date: 27 March 2003
- Country: Chile
- Language: Spanish
- Box office: $8.1 million

Sexo con Amor (Sex with Love) is a 2003 Chilean sex comedy film written, directed and co-starred by Boris Quercia. Starring Sigrid Alegría, Álvaro Rudolphy, Patricio Contreras, María Izquierdo, and Quercia, the film focuses on parents of schoolchildren taking a sex education course who end up examining their own sex lives. The film was released on 27 March 2003.

== Plot ==
Luisa, a young and new teacher, organizes a meeting with parents to discuss the approach to sex education at her primary school. However, the topic of sexuality remains unresolved for her and many of the parents, including her secret lover Jorge, a shy butcher named Emilio, and a brash businessman named Álvaro. Sex with Love is the story of how these three parents and the teacher herself are caught off guard by their own erotic desires. Despite professing undying love to their partners, they eagerly embark on a rollercoaster ride of physical relationships, leading to both tragic and hilarious consequences.

== Cast ==
- Sigrid Alegría as Luisa
- Álvaro Rudolphy as Álvaro
- Patricio Contreras as Jorge
- María Izquierdo as Maca
- Boris Quercia as Emilio
- Cecilia Amenábar as Elena
- Francisco Pérez-Bannen as Valentín
- Javiera Díaz de Valdés as Susan
- Loreto Valenzuela as Mónica
