= Malucha Solari =

Nicaraguan-Chilean ballerina and choreographer (1920–2005)

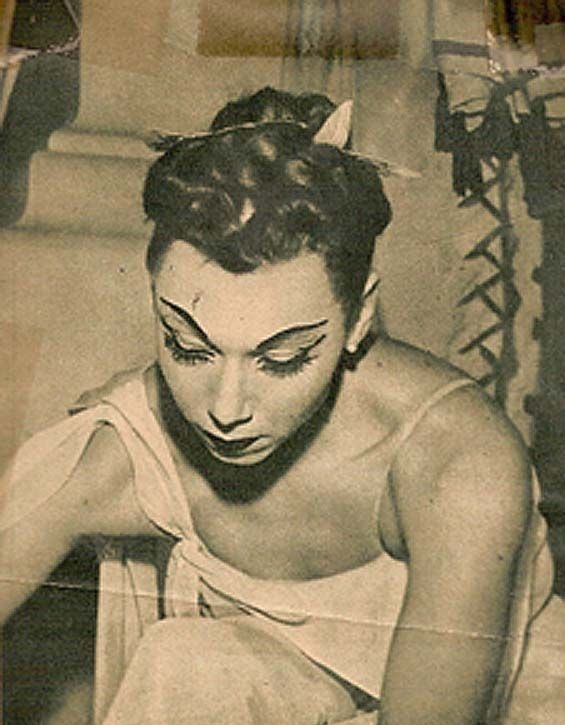
- Solari in 1945
- Born: María Luisa Solari Mongrio; 24 December 1920; Matagalpa, Nicaragua
- Died: 30 July 2005 (aged 84); Santiago, Chile
- Resting place: Parque del Recuerdo
- Occupations: Ballerina; choreographer
- Spouse: Aníbal Pinto Santa Cruz
- Children: 3, including Malucha Pinto
- Awards: National Prize for Performing and Audiovisual Arts (2001)

María Luisa "Malucha" Solari Mongrio (24 December 1920 – 30 July 2005) was a Nicaraguan-Chilean ballerina and choreographer, winner of the National Prize for Performing and Audiovisual Arts.

== Biography ==
Malucha Solari was born in the Nicaraguan city of Matagalpa, moving to Chile with her family in 1929. Although at first she took piano lessons at the National Conservatory of Music, she eventually became interested in dance, studying under Andrée Hass. Solari joined the Chilean National Ballet, a group affiliated with the University of Chile and founded by Ernst Uthoff and Lola Botka. Her first performance with the ballet was the work Coppélia, where she portrayed the character Swanilda.

In 1947, thanks to a scholarship, she traveled to the United Kingdom to perfect her technique. After returning to Chile she premiered the work El umbral del sueño (1951), which featured music by composer Juan Orrego. Three years later she premiered Façade, in which she shared the stage with Patricio Bunster. In 1966 she created the Ballet de Cámara, a dance group formed under the auspices of the University of Chile's Institute of Musical Extension, with the intent of making tours throughout the country.

In 1967 she traveled to Moscow to study with Eugene Valukin. Upon her return to Chile she helped create the National Choreographic School and the Ministry of Education's Youth Ballet. Years later she formed the Chilean Dance Council and the University ARCIS School of Dance.

Solari won Chile's National Prize for Performing and Audiovisual Arts in August 2001. She died from emphysema on 30 July 2005.

== Family ==
Solari married economist Aníbal Pinto Santa Cruz. The couple had three children, including the actress Malucha Pinto.
