= The True Story of People in the Dragon =

- Theatrical release poster
- Directed by: Pablo Greene
- Written by: Pablo Greene; Claudia Huaiquimilla
- Produced by: Claudia Huaiquimilla; Guillermo Migrik
- Starring: Catalina Saavedra; Abel Zicavo; José Antonio Raffo
- Cinematography: Guillermo Ribbeck
- Edited by: María José Salazar
- Music by: Abel Zicavo; Camilo Zicavo
- Production companies: Lanza Verde; Tercer Mundo
- Release dates: November 29, 2024 (FICVIÑA); June 5, 2025 (Chile)
- Running time: 95 minutes
- Country: Chile
- Language: Spanish

The True Story of People in the Dragon (Spanish: La verdadera historia de People in the Dragon; it was later retitled as Los People in the Dragon, lit. 'The People in the Dragon') is a 2024 Chilean mockumentary comedy film co-written and directed by Pablo Greene in his directorial debut. Starring Catalina Saavedra, Abel Zicavo and José Antonio Raffo. It follows People in the Dragon, a Chilean rock band that never took off due to the death of the vocalist, but who plan to revive the band.

== Synopsis ==
People in the Dragon was a promising Chilean rock band, but 2 days before playing at the largest music festival in the Americas, the vocalist died in an accident, breaking up the band. However, 10 years later, the members reunite to try to revive their musical dream.

== Cast ==
The actors participating in this film are:

- Catalina Saavedra as Maca
- José Antonio Raffo as Álvaro San Martín
- Abel Zicavo as Charquí
- Jose Nast as Juana
- Mario Ocampo as Joel
- Anita Reeves as Cándida
- Camilo Zicavo as Pichi
- Juan Anania as Coke
- Felipe Rojas as Nacho
- Claudio Arredondo as Claudio Elizondo
- Colomba Feite as Paola Margarita José
- Francisco Pérez-Bannen as Himself
- Dani Pino

== Release ==
The film had its world premiere on November 29, 2024, at the 36th Viña del Mar International Film Festival, then screened on January 18, 2025, at the 17th Chilean Film Festival, and on April 24, 2025, at the 25th Lebu International Film Festival.

The film was commercially released on June 5, 2025 in Chilean theaters.

== Accolades ==
Year	Award / Festival	Category	Recipient	Result	Ref.
2024	36th Viña del Mar International Film Festival	Best Film – National Feature Competition	The True Story of People in the Dragon	Nominated	
2024	36th Viña del Mar International Film Festival	Special Mention	The True Story of People in the Dragon	Won	
