= Malucha Pinto =

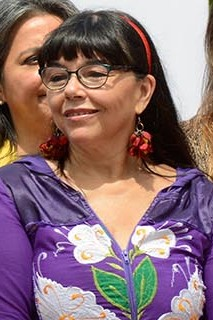
- Pinto in 2015

Member of the Constitutional Convention
- In office 4 July 2021 – 4 July 2022
- Constituency: 13th District

Personal details
- Born: Malucha Pinto Solari; 16 April 1955 (age 71) Santiago, Chile
- Spouse: Joaquín Eyzaguirre
- Parents: Aníbal Pinto Santa Cruz (father); Malucha Solari (mother)
- Occupation: Actress, dramatist
- Awards: APES Award (1999)

Malucha Pinto Solari (born 16 April 1955) is a Chilean actress, theater director, playwright and politician.

== Biography ==
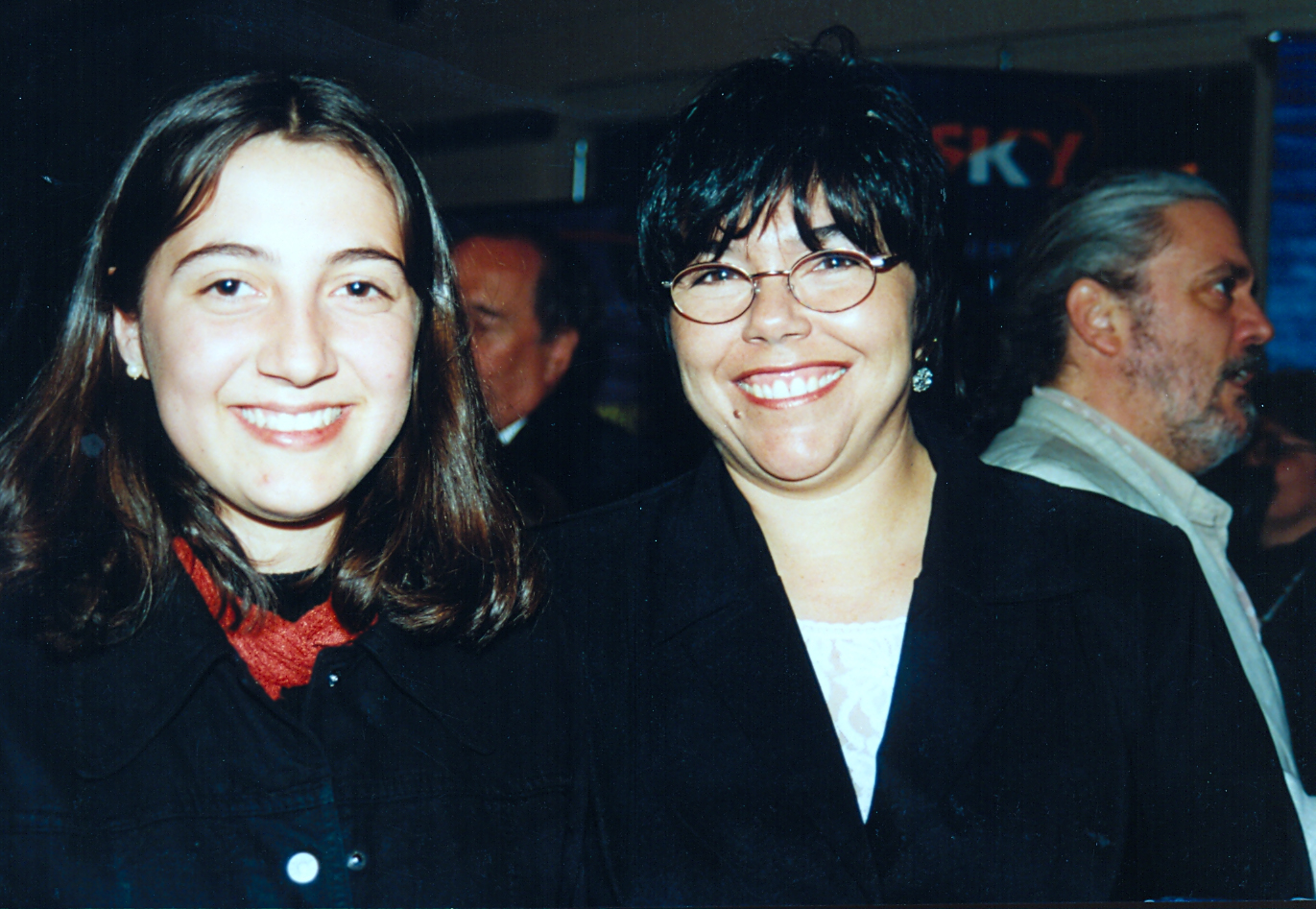
Pinto (right) in 2002

The daughter of Aníbal Pinto Santa Cruz (and direct descendant of the presidents Francisco Antonio Pinto and Aníbal Pinto Garmendia) and the Nicaraguan-Chilean dancer Malucha Solari, Malucha Pinto began her career on the telenovela Alguien por quien vivir, then debuted on Sábado Gigante in 1982 as Señorita Priscilla Caucaman in Los Eguiguren, a segment that ran until early 1987. Her next appearance was on the comedy program De chincol a jote, where she originated several characters with actors such as Coca Guazzini and Gonzalo Robles. In 1992, Pinto, Guazzini, and Robles created a new comedy show on Televisión Nacional de Chile (TVN), Jaguar Yu, which was on the air until 1993.

Malucha Pinto and her husband Joaquín Eyzaguirre are the parents of a son with cerebral palsy named Tomás. In 1996, she wrote the book Cartas para Tomás dedicated to him. This remained on Chile's bestseller list for ten weeks and is now required reading in schools. It was the basis of the play Tomás, in which Coca Guazzini played the role of Malucha.

In 1999 she won an APES Award for Best Actress for her role in the telenovela Cerro Alegre.

In 2007, she played the leading role of Leonor Santa Cruz in the Chilevisión series Vivir con 10.

Since 9 March 2011, she has been a member of the editorial committee of the weekly newspaper Cambio 21.

In 2011, Pinto directed the play La pasionaria, for which she was nominated for APES and Altazor Awards in 2012. That year she was invited back onto Sábado Gigante with Coca Guazzini, Gonzalo Robles, and Cristián García-Huidobro to revive Los Eguiguren.

In 2016 she received the Elena Caffarena Award for her contribution to the defense of women's rights in Chile. Also in 2016 she returned to Canal 13 to star in Preciosas, playing Marta, a woman in prison who is about to complete her sentence.

== Filmography ==
=== Films ===
Year	Title	Role	Director
1982	La Candelaria		Silvio Caiozzi
1987	Sussi		Gonzalo Justiniano
1999	La chica del Crillón	Ismenia	Alberto Daiber
2002	El fotógrafo	Mercedes	Sebastián Alarcón
2003	The Chosen One	Lucrecia	Gabriel López & Nacho Argiró
2003	XS: The Worst Size	Rebeca Chávez	Jorge López Sotomayor
2006	Rojo, la película	Yurita Sánchez	Nicolás Acuña
2012	No	Cameo	Pablo Larraín
2018	Huenchula		

=== Telenovelas ===
Year	Title	Role	Channel
1982	Alguien por quien vivir	Olga Filippi	Canal 13
1982	Anakena	Employee of Dr. Soler	Canal 13
1999	Cerro Alegre	Zulema Chávez	Canal 13
2001	Corazón pirata	Ema Lecaros	Canal 13
2001	Amores de mercado	Mónica Peralta	TVN
2002	Purasangre	Rosa Espinoza	TVN
2003	Pecadores	Laura Machuca	TVN
2004	Destinos cruzados	Prudencia Barrera	TVN
2005	Los treinta	Gloria Duarte	TVN
2007	Vivir con 10	Leonor Santa Cruz	Chilevisión
2008	Mala Conducta	Ninfa Acevedo	Chilevisión
2010	Mujeres de lujo	Teresa Moyano	Chilevisión
2011	Infiltradas	Nélida Verdugo	Chilevisión
2012	La Sexóloga	Yolanda Tapia	Chilevisión
2015	Buscando a María	Raquel Cifuentes	Chilevisión
2016	Preciosas	Marta Brosic	Canal 13
2018	Soltera otra vez 3	Marilu Puga	Canal 13
2019	Nueva Nocturna		Mega

=== TV series and specials ===
Year	Title	Role	Type	Channel
1979	Martín Rivas	Upper Class Woman	Guest (1 episode)	TVN
1989	Los Venegas		Guest	TVN
1997	Brigada Escorpión	Bárbara	Guest (1 episode)	TVN
2005	Los simuladores	Susana		Canal 13
2009	Aquí no hay quien viva	Mónica Hurtado	Lead role	Chilevisión
2010	Infieles		Guest	Chilevisión
2011	Cesantes	Soíla	Cast (1 episode)	Chilevisión
2019	La Vida Simplemente	Vieja Linda		La Red

=== TV programs ===
- El show del Tío Alejandro
- Sábado Gigante/Los Eguiguren (1982–1987, 2012) – Srta. Priscilla
- De chincol a jote (1987–1991)
- Jaguar Yu (1992–1993) – Various characters
- Teatro en Chilevisión (2012) – Sra. Lily
- Mentiras Verdaderas (La Red, 2013) – Guest
- Sin Dios Ni Late (Zona Latina, 2013) – Guest
- Buenos Días a Todos (TVN, 2013) – Guest
- Mujeres primero (La Red, 2013) – Guest
- Dudo (13C, 2013) – Guest
- Más vale tarde (Mega, 2014) – Guest
- Buenos Días a Todos (TVN, 2015) – Guest
- Sin Dios Ni Late (Zona Latina, 2015) – Guest
- Me Late (UCV, 2016) – Guest
- Algo Personal (UCV, 2016) – Guest
- Bienvenidos (Canal 13, 2016) – Guest
- Mi rincón (Chilevisión, 2017) – Guest
- La noche es nuestra (Chilevisión, 2018) – Guest
- La divina comida (Chilevisión, 2018) – Guest

== Books ==
- Cartas para Tomás (1996). 110 pages. Editorial Catalonia. ISBN 9789568303648.
- Cartas de la memoria. Patrimonio epistolar de una generación de mujeres (2007). 336 pages. Editorial Catalonia. ISBN 9789568303556.
