= Aníbal Pinto Santa Cruz =

Chilean economist

Aníbal Pinto
- Born: Aníbal Pinto Santa Cruz; 1919; Santiago, Chile
- Died: 3 January 1996 (aged 76–77)
- Education: University of Chile; London School of Economics
- Spouse: Malucha Solari
- Children: Malucha Pinto
- Awards: National Prize for Humanities and Social Sciences (1995)
- Scientific career
- Fields: Economist

Aníbal Pinto Santa Cruz (Latin American Spanish: [aˈniβal ˈpinto ˈsanta cɾus]; 1919 – 3 January 1996) was a Chilean economist known for his work on dependency theory and structuralist economics. From 1960 to 1965 he was director of the United Nations Economic Commission for Latin America and the Caribbean office in Rio de Janeiro.

In 1995 he received Chile's National Prize for Humanities and Social Sciences.

He was married to ballerina Malucha Solari and the couple had three children, including the actress Malucha Pinto.
