= Gregorio González Nicolini =

Chilean film producer

- Born: Gregorio González Nicolini; May 22, 1974 (age 52); Caracas, Venezuela
- Occupations: Film production, financial engineering

Gregorio González Nicolini (born May 22, 1974), known as Gregorio González, is a Chilean film producer and financial engineer, founder and currently CEO of LVA Indices (2005) and founder of film production company Forastero (2009), producing Sundance winner La Nana, among other films. He is nephew to Chilean TV celebrity Roberto Nicolini, great grandson of Italian architect Arnaldo Barison, who designed many of the landmark buildings of Valparaíso such as Palacio Baburizza, and great great grandson of Italian painter Giuseppe Barison. His brother Pablo González is an internationally recognised designer and one of the owners of Santiago Motion Graphics (SMOG).

== Early life and education ==
Gregorio González Nicolini was born in Venezuela to Chilean parents. He attended primary through the beginning of secondary school at Institutos Educacionales Asociados in Caracas. The family returned to Chile in 1989, settling in Santiago de Chile, where he finished high school at Colegio San Ignacio El Bosque. He studied Mathematical Engineering at the Department of Mathematical Engineering of the University of Chile. His engineering thesis advisors were Chilean National Science Award winners Eric Goles and Servet Martínez, and his thesis work led to the publication of a "short communications" article in Springer-Verlag journal Granular Matter. He is a self-taught filmmaker and later studied acting at the Academia Club de Teatro in Santiago, Chile.

== Career ==
=== Finance ===
Gregorio González started his career in finance in 1999 as an analyst at financial boutique Vision Advisors, providing quantitative analysis for Chilean pension funds as part of their institutional fund distribution service.

In 2003, Gregorio González was Head of Research at Vision Advisors, where he started the project that led to the creation of the LVA Chilean fixed income indices, a joint venture between Vision Advisors and investment bank LarrainVial to calculate and provide indexes for the Chilean local fixed income market. The launching of the indices in 2005 led to the launching of the company LVA Indices. He was appointed CEO upon its creation and later made partner for his contribution to the firm.

Under his leadership, LVA Indices diversified its business beyond its initial offering of indexes, eventually including evaluated prices for local fixed income instruments, fact sheet generation for local mutual funds, risk measurement tools and others. He also negotiated a joint marketing agreement with Dow Jones Indexes and Proveedor Integral de Precios to create the LATixx indexes, launched in 2009 to cover local Latinamerican fixed income markets, which covered Mexico, Costa Rica, Colombia, Peru and Chile. The LATixx alliance ended and the indices were discontinued shortly after McGraw Hill Financial acquired Dow Jones Indexes.

=== Film ===
In 2000, Gregorio González began moonlighting as a writer for Roos Film, at the time the most important production company in Chile. His most relevant role during that time was as part of the writers team for documentary TV series Los Patiperros, which earned him a nomination to the 2002 Altazor Award. During this time he also directed two short films: Examen, made with a cast and crew consisting mostly of students and professors from his engineering school, and 2, starring professional actors Marcelo Alonso and Alessandra Guerzoni. "Examen" screened in the Los Angeles Latino International Film Festival 2003 and "2" competed in the first edition of the Festival de Cine Pobre de Cuba.

Gregorio González created Forastero in 2009 when he produced Golden Globe nominated and Sundance Grand Jury Award winner La Nana. In 2014 he invited Florencia Larrea, former manager of post house Kiné-Imágenes and producer at Shoot The Bastard Films, to join Forastero as partner.

The production company's filmography includes:

- La Nana (2009), winner of the Sundance Film Festival's Grand Jury Award and nominated for a Golden Globe
- Roman's Circuit (2011), premiered at the Toronto International Film Festival
- Thursday Till Sunday (2012), winner of the Rotterdam International Film Festival's Tiger Award
- Pérez (2013), premiered at the Chicago Latino Film Festival
- I Am Not Lorena (2014), premiered at the Toronto International Film Festival
- Aurora (2014), premiered at the Busan International Film Festival and winner of the Toulouse Film Festival's Work in Progress
- Wastelands / Tierra Yerma (2016), directed by Miriam Heard, premiered at the Eurasia International Film Festival.
- Attitude Test (2016), starring Denise Rosenthal, directed by Fabrizio Copano.
- Solo Pienso en Mi (2017), Netflix Comedy Special featuring Fabrizio Copano, directed by Rodrigo Toro and Francisco Schultz.
- And the Whole Sky Fit in the Dead Cow's Eye (2017), directed by Francisca Alegría, winner of the Sundance Film Festival's Short Film Jury Award for International Fiction.
- Dry Martina (formerly "Mucha Ex, Poco Sex") (2018), directed by Che Sandoval.
- My Tender Matador (2020), based upon the novel by Pedro Lemebel, premiered at Venice Days and acquired by Amazon Prime Video for Latinamerica.
- The Monster Within (2022), in pre-production.

== Trivia ==
- Gregorio González is one of the few people that have an Erdős–Bacon number. His Erdős–Bacon number is 6, through his publication with Eric Goles, who has an Erdős number of 2, giving him an Ërdos number of 3, and a Bacon number of 3, through his cameo in Che Sandoval's film 'Soy Mucho Mejor que Vos' with Sebastian Brahm, who was in 'De La Noche A La Mañana' with Rosario Varela, who was in 'Stir of Echoes' with Kevin Bacon.
