= I Am Not Lorena =

- Film poster
- Spanish: No soy Lorena
- Directed by: Isidora Marras
- Written by: Isidora Marras, Catalina Calcagni
- Produced by: Josefina Undurraga, Gregorio González Nicolini
- Starring: Loreto Aravena, Paulina García, Gabriela Aguilera, Matías Oviedo, Elisa Zulueta, Etienne Bobenrieth
- Cinematography: Eduardo Bunster
- Edited by: Catalina Marín
- Music by: Christian Basso
- Production companies: Forastero, Carrousel Films (co-production), Don Quijote Films (co-production), Sinsistema (post-production), Maya Castro, Gustavo Daza
- Distributed by: Shoreline Entertainment
- Release date: 5 September 2014 (Toronto)
- Running time: 82 minutes
- Countries: Chile, Argentina
- Language: Spanish

I Am Not Lorena, (Spanish: No Soy Lorena) is a 2014 Chilean film directed by Isidora Marras, written by Isidora Marras and Catalina Calcagni and produced by Josefina Undurraga and Gregorio González Nicolini. Filmed in Chile, I am not Lorena is a drama/thriller and is Isidora Marras' debut feature film.

== Plot ==
The story revolves around Olivia, a late twenties actress who has recently ended her relationship with Mauro, a theatre director. Despite their breakup, Olivia agrees to act in a play directed by Mauro. However, things do not go well for her in either her personal life or the play where she struggles to meet Mauro's demanding expectations.

To make matters worse, Olivia begins receiving an increasing number of harassing phone calls. She is mistaken for Lorena Ruiz, a woman with numerous debts, and her creditors refuse to believe they have the wrong person. The harassment persists, and Olivia's case of mistaken identity becomes a Kafkaesque nightmare as she searches for the mysterious Lorena Ruiz.

The film's director, Isidora Marras, was inspired by her own experience of mistaken identity. The movie portrays a bureaucratic and dehumanized system where people are reduced to mere consumers.

== Cast ==
- Loreto Aravena
- Paulina García (Gloria)
- Gabriela Aguilera (The Motorcycle Diaries, Violeta Went to Heaven)
- Matías Oviedo
- Elisa Zulueta
- Etienne Bobenrieth

== Release and Reception ==
The film was released on 5 September 2014 (Canada) Toronto International Film Festival, 22 October 2014 (Chile) SANFIC Film Festival, 10 November 2014 (Sweden) Stockholm International Film Festival

The film got mixed reception, reviews tend to point the inexperience of the director Isidora Marras, and how secondary characters steal the spotlight. Paulina García (Gloria)) for example as some reviews pointed.
