= Nasty Baby =

2015 film

- Theatrical release poster
- Directed by: Sebastián Silva
- Written by: Sebastián Silva
- Produced by: Charlie Dibe; David Hinojosa; Juan de Dios Larraín; Pablo Larraín; Julia Oh
- Starring: Kristen Wiig; Sebastián Silva; Tunde Adebimpe; Reg E. Cathey; Mark Margolis; Alia Shawkat; Agustín Silva; Anthony Chisholm; Neal Huff; Lillias White
- Cinematography: Sergio Armstrong
- Edited by: Sofía Subercaseaux
- Music by: Danny Bensi; Saunder Jurriaans
- Production companies: Fábula; Funny Balloons; Versatile; Killer Films
- Distributed by: The Orchard
- Release dates: January 24, 2015 (Sundance); October 23, 2015 (United States)
- Running time: 101 minutes
- Countries: Chile; United States
- Languages: English; Spanish
- Box office: $79,800

Nasty Baby is a 2015 Chilean-American drama film written and directed by Sebastián Silva and starring Kristen Wiig, Silva, and Tunde Adebimpe alongside Reg E. Cathey, Mark Margolis, Agustín Silva, Alia Shawkat, Lillias White, and Anthony Chisholm.

The film premiered at the 2015 Sundance Film Festival and was screened in the Panorama section of the 65th Berlin International Film Festival, where it was named winner of the Teddy Award for best LGBT-themed feature film. The film was released on October 23, 2015, in a limited release, before being released on video on demand on October 30, 2015, by The Orchard.

== Plot ==
The film follows the journey of Freddy and Mo, a gay couple who are struggling to conceive a child. They turn to their friend Polly for help, but despite several attempts, they are unsuccessful due to Freddy's low sperm count. Eventually, Mo reluctantly agrees to be the donor, and Polly successfully becomes pregnant.

As they navigate the challenges of pregnancy and parenthood, the trio becomes the target of a mentally unstable man known as The Bishop. Despite their initial attempts to be friendly with him, The Bishop reveals himself to be aggressively homophobic and begins to harass Polly.

One night, The Bishop violently assaults Polly, and the situation escalates when a police officer becomes involved. In the midst of all this chaos, Freddy's performance art project, "Nasty Baby," is rejected, and The Bishop follows him home.

In a desperate attempt to defend himself, Freddy strikes The Bishop with a six-pack of beer, which results in a fatal injury. Fearing the consequences of their actions, the trio decides to dispose of the body in the woods.

== Cast ==
- Kristen Wiig as Polly
- Sebastián Silva as Freddy
- Tunde Adebimpe as Mo
- Reg E. Cathey as The Bishop
- Mark Margolis as Richard
- Agustín Silva as Chino
- Alia Shawkat as Wendy
- Lillias White as Cecilia
- Anthony Chisholm as David, Mo's father
- Constance Shulman as The Bishop's girlfriend
- Neal Huff as Gallery owner
- Judy Marte as Battered woman
- Cara Seymour as Nosy neighbor

== Production ==
On August 14, 2013, it was announced Kristen Wiig was in talks to join the film, and that Sebastian Silva would direct the film as well as star alongside Tunde Adebimpe.

Principal photography took place in Fort Greene, Brooklyn, New York City.

== Release ==
The film was originally rejected by Toronto International Film Festival in 2014, since the festival did not like the film's ending. The film instead had its world premiere at the Sundance Film Festival on January 24, 2015. Shortly after it was announced The Orchard had acquired distribution rights to the film.

The film was released in a limited release on October 23, 2015, before being released on video on demand on October 30, 2015.

=== Critical reception ===
The film holds a 66% score on review aggregator website Rotten Tomatoes, based on 38 reviews, with an average rating of 6.4/10. The critical consensus reads "Nasty Baby juggles an ambitious array of tones, and not always successfully -- but its talented cast and surprising narrative twists leave a lingering impression." On Metacritic, the film holds a rating of 64 out of 100, based on 15 critics, indicating "generally favorable reviews".

Writing for The A.V. Club, Mike D'Angelo gave the film a C for its plodding pacing and the abrupt third act which "neither emerges organically from the skeletal narrative nor thematically dovetails with the other storylines in any way" but praised Wiig's performance.

== See also ==
- List of lesbian, gay, bisexual or transgender-related films of 2015
