= Cambio 21 =

Chilean newspaper

- Type: Online, weekly newspaper
- Format: Berliner
- Owner: Sociedad Periodística Cambio S.A.
- Publisher: Copesa
- Editor-in-chief: Juan Carvajal Trigo
- Founded: 2008; 18 years ago (website); 9 March 2011; 15 years ago (print)
- Political alignment: Christian Democratic Party
- Language: Spanish
- Headquarters: Huérfanos 669, Office 603
- City: Santiago
- Country: Chile
- Website: www.cambio21.cl

Cambio 21 (Change 21) is a Chilean periodical, created as an online newspaper in 2008, and published as a printed weekly since 9 March 2011.

== Print edition ==
After almost three years of exclusively appearing on the Internet, on 9 March 2011, the printed version of Cambio 21 appeared, published weekly. The launch of the written edition took place at the Torres Confectionery.

The weekly Cambio 21 is printed and distributed by Copesa. Its editorial director is Juan Carvajal, former director of the Secretariat of Communications of La Moneda during the government of Michelle Bachelet, and the editorial committee is composed of Ximena Tricallota, Malucha Pinto, Laura Albornoz, Juan Pablo Hermosilla, Claudio Arriagada, Jorge Pizarro, Ricardo Solari, and Alfredo Ugarte.
