= Catalina Pulido =

Chilean actress (born 1974)

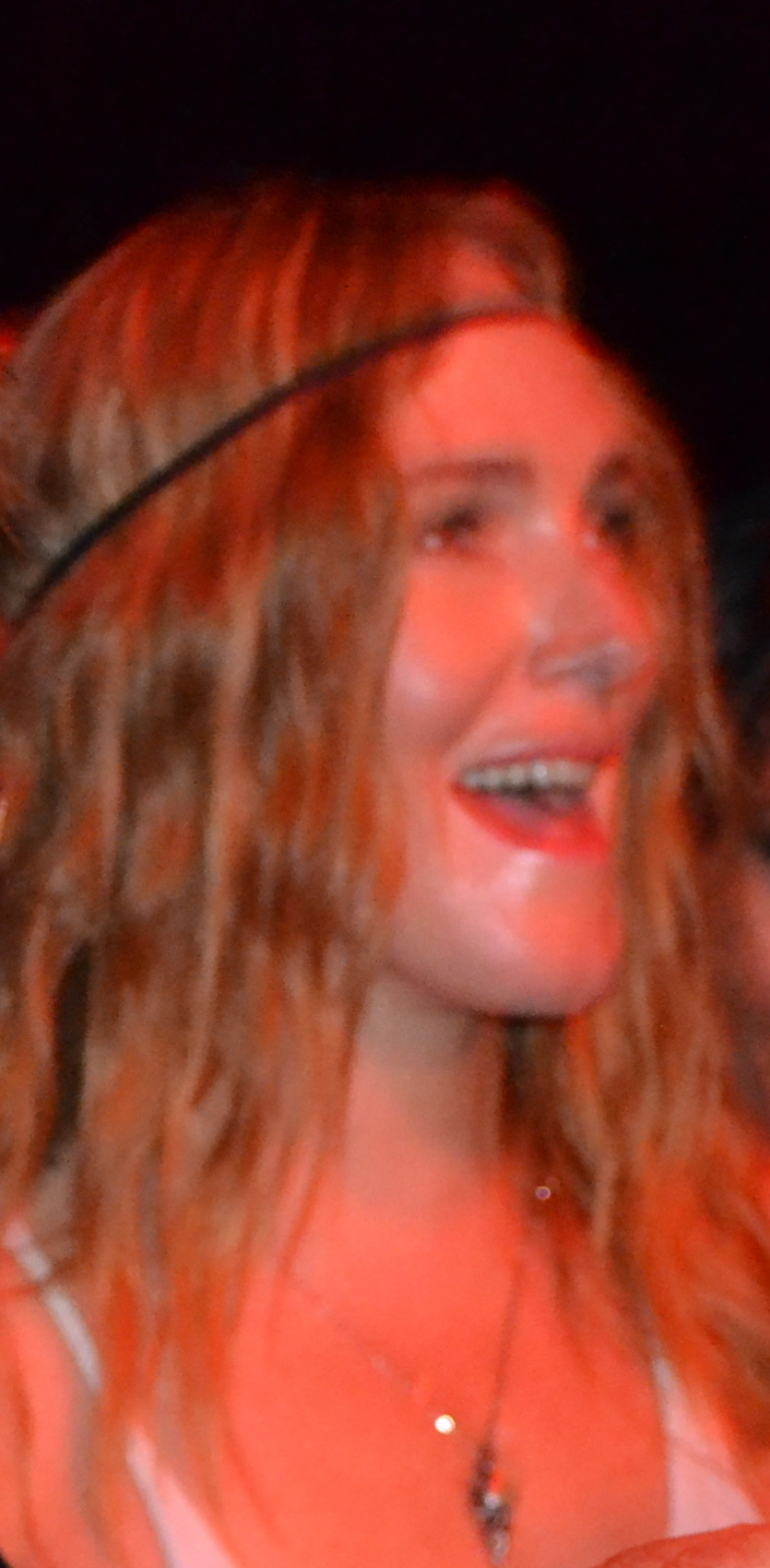
- Pulido in 2011

Personal details
- Born: María Catalina Pulido Anker; 14 September 1974 (age 52) Santiago, Chile
- Party: Republican Party (2020–)
- Height: 1.76 m (5 ft 9 1/2 in)
- Occupation: Actress, model (1993–)

María Catalina Pulido Anker (born 14 September 1974) is a Chilean actress, model, and television presenter.

== Career ==
In 1993, she debuted in the video clip of the song "Fe" by Jorge González. Her outrageous look, red haired, 1.76m (5 ft 9 in) height, and her particular facial features, made her stand out in the Chilean modeling business.

She studied theater at the Fernando González Mardones Theater Club Academy. She began her television career on the TV series Playa Salvaje and later other successful telenovelas such as Marparaíso, Cerro Alegre, and the all time audience record Amores de mercado. The last telenovelas in which she participated were La sexóloga and Bim Bam Bum.

She also has participated in four feature films, most notably a minor supporting role in Pablo Larraín's critically acclaimed The Club (2015).

Since 2001 she has also worked as a TV presenter. In 2004 she was the host of the Chilean adaptation of The Weakest Link produced by Channel 13. From 2016 to 2019 she hosted the program Intrusos en La Red, where she got fired after a controversy involving a physical aggression against Carabineros de Chile for being fined for not fastening the seat belt while driving.

In 2008, she performed the monologue "Being famous is a chub" for the Chilevisión program El club de la comedia.

After her departure from television, she has participated with Patricia Maldonado in the online program "Las Indomables".

In 2020, she announced her candidacy for councilor of Las Condes for the right Chilean Republican Party. She was not elected.

== Filmography ==
=== Films ===
- Santos (2005)
- Drama (2010)
- Maknum González (2013)
- The Club (2015)

=== Telenovelas ===
Teleseries
Año	Teleserie	Personaje	Rol	Canal
1997	Playa Salvaje	Javiera Huidobro	Protagónico	Canal 13
1998	Marparaíso	Josefina Arrieta	Co-protagónico	Canal 13
1999	Cerro Alegre	Mariana Ferrer	Antagónico	Canal 13
2000	Santo Ladrón	Lucía Amaral	Antagónico	TVN
2001	Amores de mercado	Chantal Müller	Secundario	TVN
2001	Oveja Negra	–	Invitada	TVN
2002	Purasangre	Cecilia Vergara	Secundario	TVN
2005	Casados	–	Protagónico	Chilevisión
2007	Héroes	Emilia Toro	Secundario	Canal 13
2010	Manuel Rodríguez	Paula de Salas y Velasco	Co-protagónico	Chilevisión
2011–2012	La Doña	Perpetua Ximénez de Mendoza	Co-protagónico	Chilevisión
2011	Karma	Mariana	Protagónico	Chilevisión
2012–2013	La sexóloga	Mónica "Moni" Cooper	Secundario	Chilevisión
2013	Bim Bam Bum	Sara Vicuña	Antagónico	TVN

=== Television conduction ===
Año	Programa	Rol	Canal
2001	Oveja negra	Conductora	TVN
2004	El rival más débil	Conductora	Canal 13
2005	Granjeras	Conductora	Canal 13
2007	Locos por el baile	Participante	Canal 13
2008	Amor ciego II, el casting	Jueza	Canal 13
2010	La Movida del Festival	Opinóloga	Canal 13
2010	¿Quién quiere ser millonario?	Participante	Canal 13
2011–12	Yo soy...	Jueza	Mega
2012	Festival Viva Dichato	Presentadora	Mega
2012–13	SCL Moda	Conductora	Canal 13
2012	Vértigo	Invitada	Canal 13
2013	Baila! Al ritmo de un sueño	Participante	Chilevisión
2013	Dudo	Invitada	Canal 13
2013	Más Vale Tarde	Invitada	Mega
2014	Mentiras Verdaderas	Invitada	La Red
2016	Vértigo	Invitada	Canal 13
2016	La Divina Comida	Participante anfitriona	Chilevisión
2016–2019	Intrusos	Panelista	La Red
2017	Mujeres Primero	Conductora	La Red
2017–2018	Hola Chile	Panelista	La Red
