= The Frontier (1991 film) =

- Chilean theatrical release poster
- Directed by: Ricardo P. Larrain
- Written by: Jorge Goldenberg; Ricardo P. Larrain
- Produced by: Mara Sanchex; Dolores Soler
- Starring: Patricio Contreras; Gloria Laso
- Cinematography: Héctor Ríos
- Edited by: Claudio Martínez
- Music by: Jaime de Aguirre
- Release date: 25 October 1991
- Running time: 120 minutes
- Country: Chile
- Language: Spanish

The Frontier (Spanish: La Frontera) is a 1991 Chilean drama film, directed by Ricardo Larraín and starring Patricio Contreras and Gloria Laso. Larraín won the Silver Bear for an outstanding single achievement at the 42nd Berlin International Film Festival. The film was submitted as Chile's entry for the Best Foreign Language Film category at the 64th Academy Awards, but was not nominated.

== Plot ==
During the final years of Chile's military dictatorship, Ramiro Orellana is sentenced to internal exile. He is sent to the La Frontera region, a historic boundary between the Mapuche people and Spanish colonization. In La Frontera, Ramiro discovers a new dimension of life that prompts him to confront his own inner boundaries...

== Cast ==
- Patricio Contreras as Ramiro Orellana
- Gloria Laso as Maite
- Alonso Venegas as Delegate
- Sergio Schmied as Secretary
- Aldo Bernales as Diver
- Héctor Noguera as Father Patricio
- Patricio Bunster as Don Ignacio
- Aníbal Reyna as Detective robusto
- Sergio Hernández as Detective Delgado
- Elsa Poblete as Laura
- Sergio Madrid as Gutiérrez
- Joaquin Velasco as Hernán
- Griselda Núñez as Sra. Hilda
- Eugenio Morales as Assistant Driver
- Raqual Curilem as Bar Owner

== See also ==
- List of submissions to the 64th Academy Awards for Best Foreign Language Film
- List of Chilean submissions for the Academy Award for Best Foreign Language Film
