= Catalina Saavedra =

Chilean actress

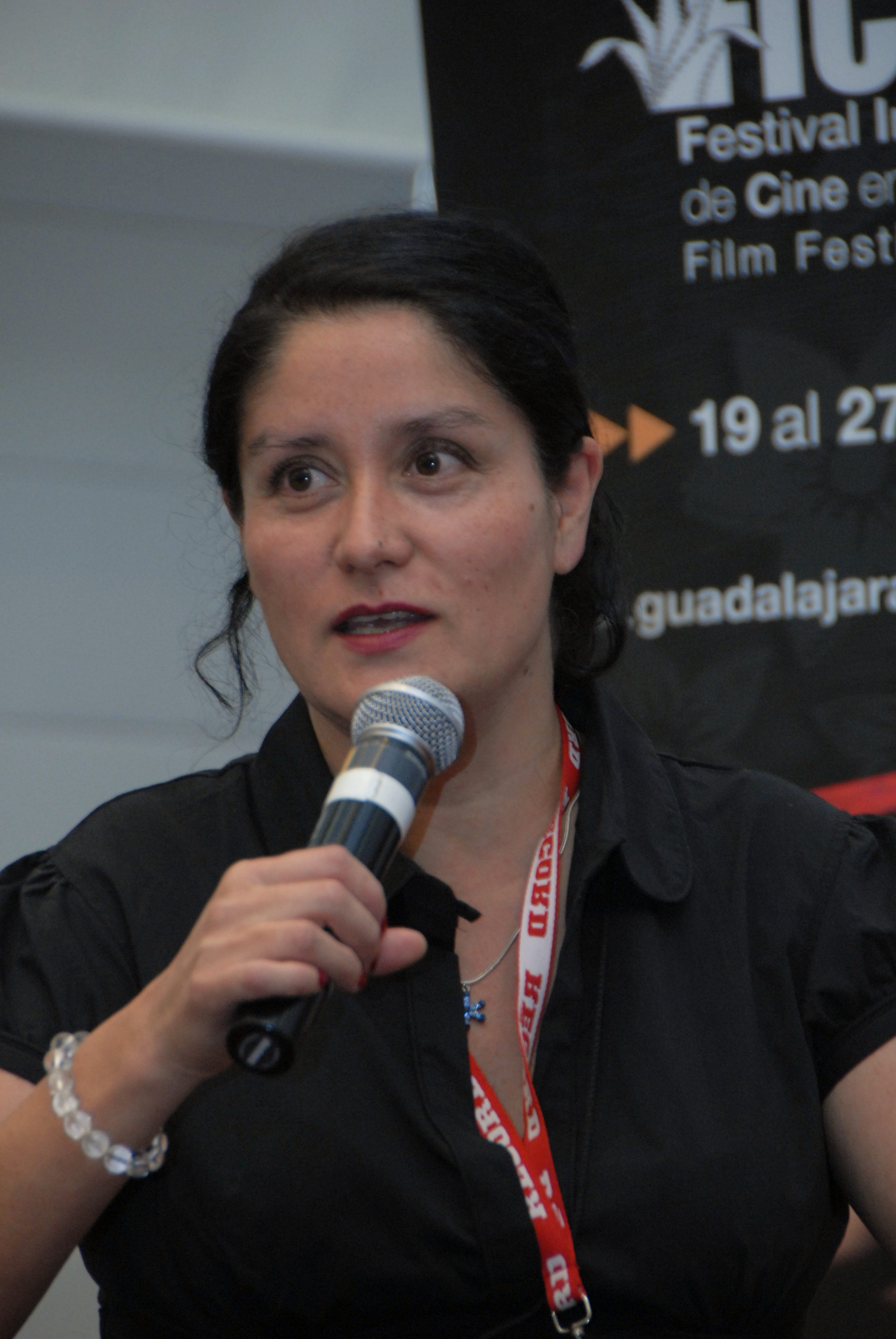
- Saavedra in 2009
- Born: Catalina Saavedra Pérez; 8 January 1968 (age 58); Valparaíso, Chile
- Occupation: Actress
- Years active: 1991–present
- Father: Omar Saavedra Santis

Catalina Saavedra Pérez (born 8 January 1968) is a Chilean film, stage and television actress. She is known to international audiences for playing the title character in the 2009 film The Maid, for which she received several awards and nominations.

== Career ==
Saavedra's father is the writer Omar Saavedra Santis. She started acting lessons at the age of ten, prompted by her mother's hiring of a private theater arts teacher in Valparaíso. Years later, her love for acting led her to deepen her studies at the "Escuela de Teatro Imagen" in Santiago and later in Barcelona, when she began to study experimental theatre.

Saavedra's first professional theatre performances were in roles in plays such as El Despertar (1991–1997), Pervertimientos y Otros Gestos Para Nada (1993) and La noche de la Iguana (The Night of the Iguana) (1994), and in a café-chantant called TV cable 90 (1992). On film, Saavedra's first appearances were in short films, such as El Bidón and Volando Voy (directed by Miguel Littín). Saavedra has performed various roles in several soap operas, sitcoms and TV shows on Chilean and German television.

International recognition for Saavedra came in 2009, for her leading role as Raquel in the 2009 Chilean film The Maid (2009 film). It was released on 13 August 2009 in Chile and 16 October 2009 in the United States, grossing over $400,000 in the first few weeks in theaters with only 18 copies circulating, turning into one of the most successful Chilean films in the United States. The film ended its theatrical run in the United States with a gross of $576,608. Her role was praised by specialized press and critics around the world, bestowing her many acting awards, including Best Actress at the Sundance Film Festival, Torino Film Festival, Huelva Film Festival, Biarritz Film Festival, Cartagena Film Festival and Miami Film Festival, a breakthrough award at the Gotham Independent Film Awards and a Satellite Awards nomination. In late 2009, she appeared as a possible nominee for the most important film awards, Academy Awards and Golden Globes Awards along with the film The Maid for International Movie.

== Filmography ==
Year	Title	Role	Notes
1997	El Bidón		Short film
1997	Volando Voy	Luchita	Short film directed by Miguel Littín, director nominated twice for an Academy Award.
1999	Salmón a lo Pobre		Short film
2002	La Perra		
2007	Normal con Alas		
2007	Life Kills Me		
2008	31 minutos, la película	Cachirula (voice)	Havana Film Festival Award-winning for Best Animated Film
2008	Ausente		
2008	Chile puede	Magda	Supported by the National Council For Arts & Culture, Chile
2008	Mami Te Amo		
2008	Secretos		
2009	The Dancer and the Thief	Madre Ángel	Short appearance. Directed by Fernando Trueba, Academy Award winner for Best Foreign Language Film with Belle Époque.
2009	The Maid	Raquel	Sundance Film Festival Award-winning. Nominated for "The 67th Annual Golden Globe Awards" consideration honoring 2009 achievements.
2011	Old Cats		
2014	The Quispe Girls	Lucía Quispe	Directed by Sebastián Sepúlveda.
2018	Marilyn		
2019	Ema		Directed by Pablo Larrain
2021	La mirada incendiada		Directed by Tatiana Gaviola
2022	The Punishment		Directed by Matías Bize
2023	History and Geography	Atenea	Directed by Bernardo Quesney
2023	Problemista	Dolores	Directed by Julio Torres
2023	Rotting in the Sun	Señora Verónica	Directed by Sebastián Silva
2024	The True Story Of People In The Dragon	Maca	Directed by Pablo Greene

== Awards and nominations ==
=== Theatre ===
Year	Award	Category	Work	Result
2008	Altazor Awards	Best Actress in a Play	Las Brutas	Won

=== Film ===
Year	Award	Category	Work	Result
2007	SANFIC	Special Mention for Acting	Life Kills Me	Won
2009	Guadalajara International Film Festival	Best Actress in a leading role	The Maid	Won
2009	Iberoamerican Huelva Film Festival	Best Actress in a leading role	The Maid	Won
2009	Turin Film Festival	Best Actress in a leading role	The Maid	Won
2009	Biarritz Film Festival	Best Actress in a leading role	The Maid	Won
2009	Cartagena International Film Festival	Best Actress in a leading role	The Maid	Won
2009	Miami International Film Festival	Best Actress in a leading role	The Maid	Won
2009	Havana Film Festival	Best Actress in a leading role	The Maid	Won
2009	Sundance Film Festival Awards	World Cinema Special Jury Prize for Acting	The Maid	Won
2009	Gotham Film Awards	Breakthrough Actor	The Maid	Won
2009	Satellite Awards 2009	Best Actress – Motion Picture Drama	The Maid	Nominated
2010	Dorian Awards	Film Performance of the Year	The Maid	Nominated
2010	Altazor Awards	Best Actress	The Maid	Won
2010	Pedro Sienna Awards	Best Actress in a Leading Role	The Maid	Won
2010	People en Español Awards	Best Actress in a Leading Role	The Maid	Nominated
2024	Independent Spirit Awards	Best Supporting Performance	Rotting in the Sun	Nominated

== Work in TV and stage ==
=== Television credits (sitcoms and series) ===
- Jaguar Yu (1992)
- Amor a domicilio, la comedia (1996) as Brígida
- Geografía del deseo (2004), as Marisa
- Los Galindo (2005), season 1, episode 1
- Loco por ti (2005), season 4, episode 2
- Los simuladores (2005), season 1, episodes 1, 3, 4 and 8
- La Nany (2005), season 1, episodes 8 and 76
- La otra cara del espejo (2006), season 1, episode 1
- Urgencias (2006), season 2, episode 9
- Huaiquimán y Tolosa (2006), season 1, episode 8
- Los Venegas (2006–2011) as Josefina

=== Television credits (soap operas) ===
- Hasta en las mejores familias (1994) as Jessica
- Amor a Domicilio (1995) as Brígida
- Adrenalina (1996) as Raquel Trujillo
- Playa Salvaje (1997) as Susana
- Fuera de Control (1999) as Pamela Duarte
- Sabor a Ti (2000) as Virginia Solano
- Piel Canela (2001) as Talula Vargas
- Buen Partido (2002) as Rita
- Fortunato (2007), as Dulcinea

=== Stage credits ===
- El Despertar (1991–1997)
- Pervertimientos y Otros Gestos Para Nada (1993)
- La noche de la Iguana (1994)
- Muerte de un Funcionario Público (1995)
- Telarañas (1996, 1998)
- Sht (2000)
- Ojos Rotos (2001–2002) (performed in Chile and at the International Hispanic Theatre Festival of Miami)
- Firmas para el Amor (2001–2002), Assistant director
- Circulando (2003)
- Ni Ahí (2004)
- Inocencia (2004)
- En La Sangre (2004)
- Putas Errantes (2005–2006)
- El lugar de la misericordia (2006), Assistant director
- Las Gallinas (2007)
- Las Brutas (2007) (performed in Chile and in a Tour to Europe)
- Los Mountainbikers (2008)
- Diatriba de la victoria (2009)
- Equívoca Fuga de Señorita Apretando un Pañuelo de encaje sobre su Pecho (2009)
