= Manuel Rodríguez (TV series) =

- Guerrillero del Amor (Spanish: The Love Guerrilla)
- Genre: Telenovela
- Written by: Ángela Bascuñán, Luis López-Aliaga, Pablo Toro, Valeria Vargas
- Directed by: Vicente Sabatini
- Starring: Ricardo Fernández; Sofía García; Cristián Carvajal; Alfredo Castro; Catalina Pulido; Willy Semler; Tiago Correa; Mariana Loyola
- Opening theme: "El cautivo de Til til" (Miranda & Tobar)
- Country of origin: Chile
- Original language: Spanish

Production
- Producers: Cecilia Stoltze, Verónica Brañes

Original release
- Network: Chilevisión
- Release: March 2010 – August 2010

Manuel Rodríguez is a Chilean telenovela broadcast in Chilevisión, based on the Chilean guerrilla Manuel Rodríguez Erdoiza. It was first aired on March 15, 2010.

== Plot ==
During the Chilean struggle for independence, Manuel Rodríguez Erdoíza becomes a legendary figure pursued by Royalist forces across Chile. Working with General San Martín, he infiltrates Chilean territory to gather intelligence, rally the patriots, and disrupt the Royalist forces. He joins forces with José Miguel Neira, the leader of a band of outlaws, to weaken the Royalists and support the Army of the Andes.

Rodríguez also falls in love with Francisca de Paula Segura y Ruiz, a young Royalist. Despite their political and social differences, their relationship leads him to take increasingly dangerous risks. As he fights for Chilean independence, Rodríguez must balance his commitment to the patriot cause with love, loyalty, and sacrifice.

== Cast ==
- Ricardo Fernández as Manuel Rodríguez y Erdoíza
- Sofía García as Francisca Segura y Ruiz
- Alfredo Castro as Casimiro Marco del Pont
- Cristián Carvajal as Vicente San Bruno
- Mariana Loyola as Micaela / Mercedes Larrain y Fernandez de Leon
- Tiago Correa as José Miguel Neira
- Catalina Pulido as Paula de Salas y Velasco
- Willy Semler as Mateo Segura y Ruiz
- José Soza as José Santiago Rodríguez-Zorrilla
- Luz Jiménez as Maria Loreto Erdoiza y Aguirre
- Roxana Campos as Tomasa Araya
- Rodrigo Pérez as Cayetano Chavez
- Javiera Hernández as Josefa Egaña y Ariztia
- Juan Pablo Ogalde as Eusebio
- Carmen Gloria Bresky as Tadea
- Roberto Farías as Ramon Villalobos
- Helen Cáceres as Leonor Olivares Da Silva
- Francisco Medina as Bernardo Larrain y Fernandez de Leon
- Nathalia Aragonese as Pascuala
- Santiago Tupper as Mariano Segura y Ruiz
- Paloma Moreno as Catalina Larrain y Salas
- Antonio Campos as Jose Joaquin Guzman y Salazar
- Claudio Castellón as Magno Perez
- Diego Ruiz as Borja de Sotomayor
- Natalia Grez as Carmen Diaz de Valdes
- Ernesto Gutiérrez as Juan Venegas
- Carlos Marin as Jacinto
- Felipe Ponce as Segundo
- Ángela Gederlini as Cora
- Nicolás Carreño as Ignacio Larrain y Salas

=== Special guests ===
- Rolando Valenzuela as Bernardo O'Higgins
- Paulo Brunetti as José de San Martín

== See also ==
- Feroz
- Martín Rivas
