= Juan Radrigán =

Chilean playwright, novelist and poet

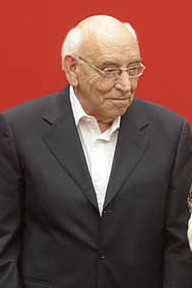
Juan Radrigán in January 2012

Juan Rojas Radrigán (January 23, 1937 – October 16, 2016) was a Chilean playwright, novelist and poet. He was awarded Chile's National Prize for Performing and Audiovisual Arts in 2011.

== Biography ==
Radrigán was born in 1937 in Antofagasta, Chile, one of three brothers born to working-class parents. As a child, Radrigán worked to support the family's scant income, never receiving a formal education. Entirely self-taught, he became an avid reader and began writing poetry and stories from the age of twelve.

Radrigán was appointed editor of Unpublished Notebooks, an official publication of the Unpublished Writers Center, from November 1961 to July 1962. At the age of 25 he published his first volume of short stories Los Vencidos no Creen en Dios, followed six years later by his second novel El Vino de la Cobardía. He died on October 16, 2016, at the age of 79.

== Themes and style ==
Radrigán's plays vary little in subject matter or dramatic technique. His characters are those living on the margins, outcast from society; substance addicts, prostitutes, the unemployed. (until his first play was performed in 1980, Radrigan himself had been an unemployed textile worker since 1973). The majority of these individuals occupy grey and depressed urban worlds, e.g. a crumbling block of flats in La Felicidad de los Garcia (1983) and a filthy, dilapidated brothel in El Toro por las Astas (1982). Others exist in further marginalised spheres, deserted dumps on the outskirts of Santiago (Hechos Consumados, 1981), and withering farmlands far from civilisation (Las Brutas, 1980). In each instance, Radrigán illustrates the crippling effects of poverty and isolation and the destructive implications for individual wellbeing and the family unit.

Radrigán began publishing work amid the Pinochet dictatorship, although his narratives reflect a lived experience of a country long-accustomed to poverty. Although not explicitly political, it is difficult not to observe the autobiographically infused nature of Radrigan's plays, particularly given his poverty-stricken upbringing, "without mentioning it by name, effectively indicts the Pinochet regime for its complicity in the brutalization of the poor".

== Worldwide acclaim ==
Internationally esteemed, Radrigán's work has toured worldwide and two of his works have been performed in the UK to date. Sue Dunderdale's production of Las Brutas (Beasts) premiered at Theatre 503 in September 2011, and in October–November 2013, coinciding with the 40th anniversary of the 1973 Chilean coup, Robert Shaw's new translation of Hechos Consumados (Children of Fate) starring Sian Reese-Williams, premiered at The Bussey Building in Peckham.

In 2011 he received Chile's National Prize for Performing and Audiovisual Arts.

== Theatre ==
- Testimonios de las muertes de Sabina, (Santiago, March 1979)
- Cuestión de ubicación, (March 1980 en el Teatro Imagen, collaboration with Gustavo Meza)
- El loco y la triste, ( Valdivia, July 1980 with Teatro Bufo, director;Jorge Torres Ulloa)
- Las brutas, (Valparaíso, August 1980; Teatro El Farol, director; Arnaldo Berríos)
- Redoble fúnebre para lobos y corderos, (February 1981, Teatro El Telón, director; Nelson Brodt)
- Hechos consumados, (Santiago, September 1981; Teatro El Telón, director; Nelson Brodt)
- El toro por las astas, Santiago September 1982; Teatro El Telón, director; Alejandro Castillo (revived in 2011 by Antonio Varas at the National Theatre, Chile)
- Informe para indifferentes, (Concepción, March 1983, director; Ricardo Monserrat)
- Las voces de la ira, (September 1984; Teatro El Telón, director; Jorge Gajardo)
- Made in Chile, (November 1984; Teatro El Telón, director; Jorge Cano)
- El pueblo de mal amor, (Santiago, May 1986, Catholic University Theatre, director; Raúl Osoria)
- Borrachos de luna, (August 1986, Compañía de Teatro Popular, director; Tennyson Curtain Ferrada)
- La contienda humana, (Zurich, February 1988, Teatro El Telón, director; Juan Edmundo González)
- Balada de los condenados a soñar, (Munich, April 1989, director; Stephan Stroux)
- Piedra de escándalo, (October 1990, Teatro Concepción, director; Juan Mateo Iribarren)
- Islas del porfiado amor, (1990)
- El encuentramiento, (June 1996)
- Parábola de los fantasmas borrachos, ( 1996)
- Perra celestial, (1999)
- Medea Mapuche, (2000)
- El exilio de la mujer desnuda, (2001)
- Esperpentos rabiosamente inmortales, (2002)
- La negra, Dios y la farsa, (2003)
- Beckett y Godot, (2004)
- Qué tiempos aquellos... Fanta y Romo, (2005)
- Diatriba de la empecinada, (2006)
- Clausurado por ausencia, (2007)
- Sin motivo aparente, (2008)
- Amores de cantina, (2009)
- Oratorio de la lluvia negra, (July 2012, Teatro La Memoria for Teatro
- la Provincia, director; Rodrigo Pérez Müffeler)
- Informe para nadie, lectura dramatizada estrenada December 2012 en el
- GAM bajo la dirección del premio nacional Fernando González7
- Bailando para ojos muertos, (Valparaíso, 2012, director; Arnaldo Berrios)
- La felicidad de los García, (originally written in the 1960s, premiered July 2013, director; Pierre Sauré).
- Ceremonial del macho cabrío, May 2013, (director; Alejandra Gutiérrez)

== Books ==
- Los vencidos no creen en Dios, (Santiago, 1962)
- El vino de la cobardía, novela corta (Santiago, 1968)
- Queda estrictamente prohibido o La ronda de las manos ajenas, ( Santiago, 1970)
- El día de los muros, poemario, Impresora Bío-Bío (Santiago, 1975)
- Hechos consumados, (Santiago, 1981)
- Teatro, (University of Minnesota, CENECA, 1984)
- Pueblo del mal amor & Los borrachos de luna, (Santiago)
- El encuentramiento, ( Santiago, 1995)
