= The Announced Death of Willy Semler =

- Theatrical release poster
- Spanish: La anunciada muerte de Willy Semler
- Directed by: Benjamin Rojo
- Written by: Matías Celedón; Benjamin Rojo
- Produced by: Dominga Ortúzar; Florencia Rodríguez
- Starring: Cuti Aste; Francisca Rojo; Willy Semler
- Cinematography: Eduardo Bunster
- Edited by: Juan Eduardo Murillo
- Music by: Benjamín Rojo; Cuti Aste
- Production company: Oro Films
- Release date: August 2022 (Guadalajara)
- Running time: 75 minutes
- Country: Chile
- Language: Spanish

The Announced Death of Willy Semler (Spanish: La anunciada muerte de Willy Semler) is a 2022 Chilean comedy-drama film directed by Benjamin Rojo (in his directorial debut) and written by Rojo & Matías Celedón. Starring Cuti Aste, Francisca Rojo and Willy Semler.

== Synopsis ==
Willy Semler, a renowned Chilean actor, is going through a bad time. His latest play is a disaster and his daughter ignores him. However, a diagnosis brings him back into the public spotlight and he is once again a celebrity.

== Cast ==
- Cuti Aste as Cuti
- Francisca Rojo as Kiki
- Willy Semler as Willy

== Release ==
The film had its international premiere in mid-August 2022 at the 37th Guadalajara International Film Festival, to then premiere in early December 2022 at the 14th Iquique International Film Festival and in mid-February 2023 at the 23rd Lebu International Film Festival, both from Chile.
