= Fistful of Dirt =

- Directed by: Sebastián Silva
- Written by: Sebastián Silva; Pedro Peirano
- Produced by: Alex A. Ginzburg; Tim Harms; Tony Lee
- Starring: Julio Gastón Ramos; Dolores Pedro; Modesto Lacen
- Cinematography: Alexis Zabe
- Edited by: Sofía Subercaseaux
- Release date: August 31, 2018 (Telluride)
- Running time: 91 minutes
- Country: United States
- Language: English

Fistful of Dirt is a 2018 American drama film, directed by Sebastián Silva, from a screenplay by Silva and Pedro Peirano. It stars Julio Gastón Ramos, Dolores Pedro and Modesto Lacen.

It had its world premiere at the Telluride Film Festival on August 31, 2018.

== Cast ==
- Julio Gastón Ramos as Yei
- Dolores Pedro as Wanda
- Modesto Lacen as Yei

== Release ==
It had its world premiere at the Telluride Film Festival on August 31, 2018.
