= Egon Wolff =

Chilean playwright and author

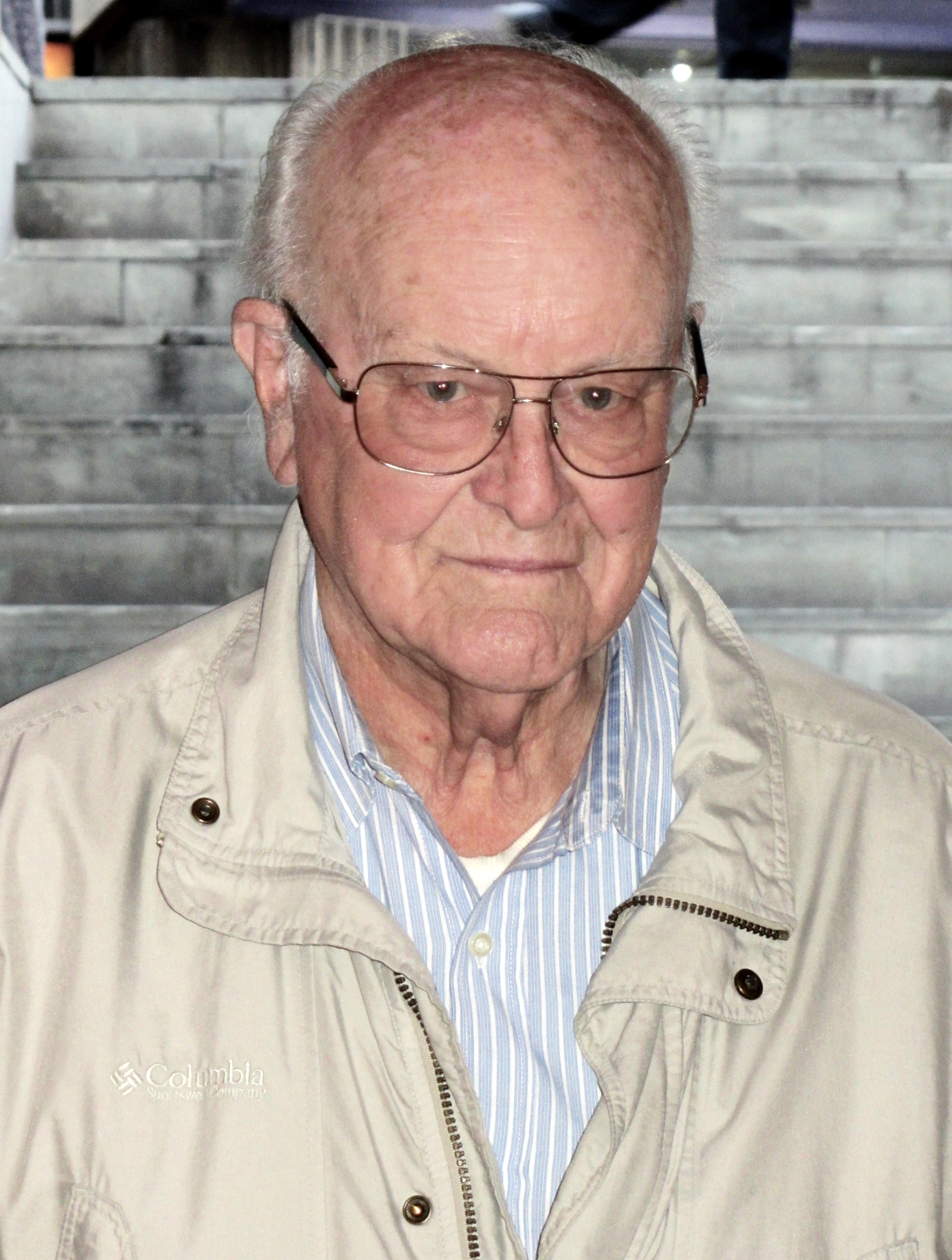
- Egon Wolff in 2015
- Born: April 13, 1926; Santiago, Chile
- Died: November 2, 2016 (aged 90)
- Education: Universidad Catolica de Chile; Yale University
- Occupation: Playwright
- Awards: National Prize for Performing and Audiovisual Arts (2013)

Egon Wolff (April 13, 1926 – November 2, 2016) was a Chilean playwright and author. Born in Santiago, he was educated in Chile and the United States.

== Early life ==
Egon Wolff was born into a middle-class family of German immigrants, to parents who espoused traditional family values and encouraged traditional work ethics. During his childhood Wolff suffered periods of ill health and turned to reading; he read the classics of world literature to escape the boredom of being sick and bedridden. At the age of 16 Wolff produced his first novel, El Ocaso (Sunset).

Wolff studied and graduated in chemical engineering from the Universidad Catolica de Chile (Catholic University of Santiago) and subsequently studied performing arts at Yale University in the United States.

== Chilean theatre ==
The formation of the Teatro Experimental de la Universidad de Chile (Experimental Theatre of the University of Chile) in 1941, followed by the founding of the Teatro del Ensayo de la Universidad Catolica (TEUC) (Theatre Actor Studio of the Catholic University) in 1943 created a qualitative change in Chilean theatre. Like many of his contemporaries in the 1950s his career begins to take form within this university theatre; he begins to develop a career with a more technical and artistic rigor which – unlike previous commercial theatre – led as much to the production of theatre as it did to the creation of new theatre groups.

== Method and themes ==
Wollf was known for the use of the fourth wall. His work gravitates towards social neo-realism in which he portrays the seemingly complex behavior and conflicts between individual as ultimately yielding to forces in their environment. Consequently, his work harbors social, political and existential themes such as conflict between social classes and between different generation groups; the moral decay and the decadence of certain social groups. His work also touches on the negative effects social conventions can have on the existence of individuals.

In some works Wolff presents two social groups that have ideas and life situations that are opposed and in struggle with each other, and by the end of work only one of these tends to prevail. He writes about the human condition the destructive nature of social forces which at times blends with magical realism that allows situations to alternate between reality and fantasy.

In one of his most famous works, Pareja de trapos (Pair of rags), the two protagonists represent the pride and prejudice of the aristocracy and the opportunism of the middle classes which in order to climb proves itself capable of anything, including immoral or criminal acts. In Los Invasores (The invaders) a luxurious residence is invaded and occupied by a group of homeless beggars in this work the audience is unable to fully determine if the event is a real or merely a “nightmare”.

Through this thematic medium, Wolff produces a critique of society.

== Legacy ==
The work of Egon Wolff has been produced in 29 countries and translated into 19 different languages.

After the death of his wife in an automobile accident in 1995 Wolff stopped working for about five years.

== Academic career and distinctions ==
He was a professor of the Theatre School of the Catholic University of Chile from 1979. He earned the Premio Municipal de Teatro (Municipal Theatre Prize) a number of times. In 1983 he entered as a principal member of the Chilean Academy of Language. In 2013 he received Chile's National Prize for Performing and Audiovisual Arts.

== Selected works ==
- Mansión de lechuzas (1957)
- Discípulos del miedo (Disciples of Fear) (1958)
- Parejas de trapo (1959)
- Niñamadre (1961)
- El signo de Caín (The Mark of Cain) (1958, 1969)
- Los invasores (The Invaders) (1963)
- Flores de papel (Paper Flowers) (1970)
- Kindergarten (1977)
- Espejismos (1978)
- Álamos en la azotea (1981)
- El sobre Azul (The Blue Envelope) (1983)
- La balsa de la Medusa (1984)
- Háblame de Laura (Speak to Me of Laura) (1985)
- Invitación a comer (Dinner Invitation) (1993)
- Cicatrices (Scars) (1994)
- Claroscuro (Chiaroscuro) (1995)
- Encrucijada (2000)
- Tras una puerta cerrada (Behind a Closed Door) 2000)
