= Ricardo Larraín =

Chilean film director

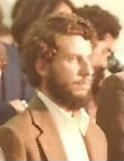
- Born: 27 April 1957; Santiago, Chile
- Died: 21 March 2016 (aged 58)
- Occupations: Film editor Film director
- Years active: 1992–2016

José Ricardo Larraín Pineda (April 27, 1957 – March 21, 2016) was a Chilean director, screenwriter, producer, and film editor known for his work in cinema, television, and advertising. Among his notable works are the films La frontera and El entusiasmo.

== Life and career ==
Larraín was born in Santiago, Chile, on April 27, 1957. He studied at the School of Communication Arts at the Pontifical Catholic University of Chile.

Larraín began his directing career with the short film La hora del sereno (1982), which he co-created with Vivienne Barry. The film, a stop-motion animation, revolved around the nostalgic figure of the sereno, a historical character who patrolled the streets lighting lanterns and announcing the time. Larraín's next project was the medium-length film Rogelio Segundo (1983), based on a story by Alfonso Alcalde. Produced by the Audiovisual Media Program of the Catholic University, the video-format film received critical acclaim and won the Latin American University Television Festival Award in Lima that same year.

One of Larraín's notable contributions was his involvement in the creation of the "No" campaign during the 1988 plebiscite. This nationwide movement played a crucial role in ending the military dictatorship led by Augusto Pinochet.

In 1991, Larraín made his cinematic debut with the film La frontera, which he co-wrote alongside Argentine screenwriter Jorge Goldenberg. The film initially gained recognition at the Havana Film Festival's Contest of Unpublished Scripts in 1989 and went on to win several international awards. La frontera received the Silver Bear at the Berlin International Film Festival and the Goya Award for Best Foreign Spanish-Language Film.

Larraín's portfolio also included documentary works. In 1997, he directed the documentary Raúl Silva Henríquez, el cardenal, which focused on the influential figure of the priest and human rights defender during Pinochet's military regime. The production earned the First Prize for Best Documentary Feature at the Human Rights Film Festival in Latin America, held in Buenos Aires, Argentina. The following year, Larraín premiered El entusiasmo, a film that was selected for the Director's Fortnight at the Cannes Film Festival in France.

In addition to his contributions to film and documentary projects, Larraín ventured into television. He served as an executive producer for the telenovela Piel canela and worked as a director and editor on the miniseries Héroes: La gloria tiene su precio. 1- O'Higgins, vivir para merecer su nombre. Furthermore, Larraín directed over eight hundred commercials for Chile and other countries.

In 2001, Larraín directed the drama department of the Television Corporation of the Catholic University and also taught at the university's School of Journalism. In 2004, Larraín founded the Professional Association of Directors and Screenwriters of Chile. Two years later, in 2006, he established the Film School at the Universidad Mayor.

On March 21, 2016, at the age of 58, Larraín died from lymphatic cancer, which he had been battling since 2006. At the time of his death, he was actively working on El guerrero enamorado, his third project dedicated to the life of Bernardo O'Higgins, following the success of the miniseries Héroes and El niño rojo.

== Selected filmography ==
- La frontera (1991)
- El entusiasmo (1998)
- Chile puede (2008)
- El niño rojo, la película (2014)
