= Tiago Correa =

Chilean film, television, and stage actor

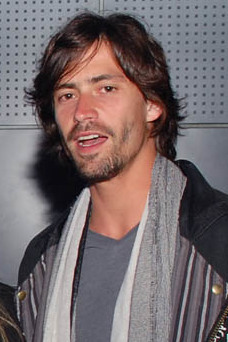
Tiago Correa

Tiago Kadú Correa Girrulat (born August 28, 1981, in Santiago de Chile, Chile), is a Chilean actor of films and telenovelas.

== Biography ==
The son of a Chilean father and Brazilian mother, Tiago Correa was born in Chile, but at a year of age moved to Santa Catarina, in the South of Brazil with his parents and his sister Itaci, where he remained until age eight.

In 2010 he married Ignacia Allamand, also an actor, with whom he has shared the screen in the soap operas Vivir con 10 (2007), Mala Conducta (2008) and Infiltradas of Chilevisión.

== Filmography ==
Television
Year	Title	Role	Notes
2002	Bienvenida realidad: la película	Franco	TV movie
2004	Bienvenida realidad	Franco Torres / Franco	Season 1, episode 1: "El accidente" Season 1, episode 2: "Vuelta al colegio"
2005	Heredia & asociados	Diego	Supporting role
2005	Loco por ti	Óscar	Season 6, episode 2: "Echarse atrás"
2006	Entre medias	Kike	12 episodes
2007	Fiestapatria	Álvaro	
2007	Vivir con 10	Lukas Yankovic	Supporting role
2008	Mala Conducta	Félix Inostroza	7 episodes
2009	Sin anestesia	Rafael Quiñones	Supporting role
2010	Manuel Rodríguez	José Miguel Neira	Supporting role
2011	Karma	Juan	Season 1, episode 3: "Formas del sexo"
2011	Infiltradas	Lautaro Verdugo	Co-protagonist
2012-13	La Sexóloga	Pancho Pamplona	Co-protagonist
2013	Prófugos	David	4 episodes
2014	La canción de tu vida	Juan José	Season 1, episode 4: "Cariño malo"
2015	Dueños del paraíso	Mario Alejandro Esparza	Co-protagonist
2015	La poseída	Vicente Smith	Supporting role
2019	La reina del sur 2	Jonathan Peres	
2021	Madre solo hay dos	Matius	
2023	Sky Rojo	Darwin	Main role (season 3)
2024	El amor no tiene receta	Mauro Nicoliti	
2025	Amanecer	Joaquín Franco	
2026	Polen	Jacobo	Main role

== Theater Plays ==
Theater plays
Year	Play	Role
2015-2016	El Contrabajo	
2014	Venus en Piel	Thomas
2012-2013	Juan y Beatriz	Juan
2011	Gleenglary Glen Ross	Roma
2010	Negro Animal Tristeza	Flynn
2007	Capote, manipulador	
2007	Hamelin	Josemari
2006	Cocinando con Elvis	Stuart
2005-2006	Animales	Boxer y Roben Denirou
2003-2004	El Crimen de cura Tato	Lucho
