= Chile puede =

2008 film by Ricardo Larraín

- Directed by: Ricardo Larraín
- Written by: Boris Quercia
- Produced by: Diego Izuierda
- Starring: Willy Semler, Alvaro Rudolphy, Javiera Contador, Boris Quercia, Hugo Arana, Bélgica Castro
- Cinematography: Estéban Courtalon
- Music by: Ernesto Trujillo, Marcos de Aguirre
- Release date: January 3, 2008
- Running time: 85 minutes
- Country: Chile
- Language: Spanish
- Box office: $365,966

Chile puede (Spanish for: Chile can do it) is a 2008 Chilean science fiction comedy film about an illegal private Chilean space venture orchestrated by a mad tycoon that comes under the suspicions of the United States government, as an Arab and Al-Qaeda motivated anthrax-filled-satellite attack on the United States.

== Plot ==
A group of scientists is working in the north of Chile, preparing for the first Chilean space mission. However, just before the launch, an industrial dispute breaks out between the scientists and engineers over wages and working conditions. They walk out of the ground control center, leaving the project director to launch the mission with astronaut Guillermo.

As the mission progresses, the director realizes that he does not know how to bring Guillermo back to Earth alive. Guillermo is left orbiting the Earth until an old Russian scientist, who worked on the Sputnik program and now lives in Chile, enters the scene. The Russian scientist contacts a cosmonaut who is on the old MIR space station and together they manage to force the Chilean spaceship back into Earth's orbit with a push.

== Cast ==
- Hugo Arana ... First engineer
- Bélgica Castro ... Russian scientist
- Javiera Contador ... Ana María (girlfriend of Guillermo)
- Boris Quercia ... Guillermo, Spanish high school teacher, and mission's astronaut
- Álvaro Rudolphy... Journalist
- Willy Semler ... Patricio, millionaire, mad mind, and financier
