= Omar Saavedra Santis =

Chilean writer (1944–2021)

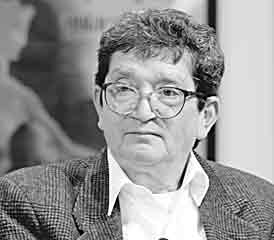
- Omar Saavedra in 2007.
- Born: 15 July 1944; Valparaíso, Chile
- Died: 23 December 2021 (77 years old); Valparaíso, Chile
- Occupation: writer
- Children: Catalina Saavedra
- Awards: Anna Seghers Prize

Omar Saavedra Santis (15 July 1944 – 23 December 2021) was a Chilean writer. He spent many years in exile in Europe after the CIA-backed coup that toppled the government of Salvador Allende in 1973. He won numerous literary prizes, among them the Anna Seghers Prize. His daughter is the actress Catalina Saavedra.

Saavedra died on 23 December 2021, at the age of 77.
