= Johnny 100 Pesos =

- Directed by: Gustavo Graef Marino
- Starring: Armando Araiza; Patricia Rivera
- Release date: 10 November 1993
- Running time: 90 minutes
- Country: Chile
- Language: Spanish

Johnny 100 Pesos (Spanish: Johnny cien pesos) is a 1993 Chilean crime film directed by Gustavo Graef Marino. The film was selected as the Chilean entry for the Best Foreign Language Film at the 66th Academy Awards, but was not accepted as a nominee.

== Plot ==
In 1990, Santiago de Chile saw the end of seventeen years of military dictatorship. Seven months into democracy, 17-year-old high school student Juan García García, aka "el Johnny" (Armando Araiza), joins a gang of small-time criminals, including members such as "el Loco," to carry out a robbery at a video store that is a front for money laundering.

Initially, Johnny takes a bus with a gun in his backpack, accidentally firing a shot that prompts the driver to stop the bus and try to persuade him. Johnny escapes and heads to the location of the robbery, where much of the film's plot takes place.

Johnny enters the apartment where movies are supposedly rented, and soon his accomplices arrive. The group quickly realizes that the money is kept in an office locked by Don Alfonso (Luis Gnecco) and his secretary/lover, Gloria (Patricia Rivera).

Although the plan is perfect, the gang is forced to take the video store occupants hostage when they spot the police approaching. Consequently, the gang finds itself surrounded by law enforcement.

The robbery quickly turns into a hostage situation, and the group is identified on television when some journalists find Johnny's identification card.

The video store is located on the eighth floor of a building on Estado Street (downtown Santiago). As it is just steps away from La Moneda Palace, the government must take action. The Chilean police (Carabineros) become involved in the operation to sway public opinion and to prevent the government from being implicated in any deaths or injuries resulting from this criminal act.

As the crime unfolds, Gloria tries to seduce Johnny, managing to hit him with a frying pan and steal his gun.

The press of the time covers this assault and subsequent kidnapping live, causing a great uproar nationwide due to the news reports obtained by a news program, which are directed at Johnny's school and home.

Finally, the robbers negotiate their arrest and detention with the police. When most of the gang surrenders, Johnny takes his gun and shoots himself. The movie ends with an image of Johnny inside an ambulance.

== Cast ==
- Armando Araiza as Johnny García
- Patricia Rivera as Gloria
- Willy Semler as Freddy
- Aldo Parodi as Loco
- Rodolfo Bravo as Washington
- Eugenio Morales as Leo
- Sergio Hernández as Mena Mendoza

== See also ==
- List of submissions to the 66th Academy Awards for Best Foreign Language Film
- List of Chilean submissions for the Academy Award for Best Foreign Language Film
