= The Maid (2009 film) =

- Theatrical film poster
- Directed by: Sebastián Silva
- Written by: Pedro Peirano; Sebastián Silva
- Produced by: Gregorio González
- Starring: Catalina Saavedra; Claudia Celedón; Alejandro Goic
- Cinematography: Sergio Armstrong
- Edited by: Danielle Fillios
- Production companies: Productora Forastero; Tiburón Filmes; Punto Guión Punto Producciones; Diroriro
- Distributed by: Elephant Eye Films
- Release dates: January 17, 2009 (Sundance); August 13, 2009 (Chile)
- Running time: 95 minutes
- Countries: Chile; Mexico
- Language: Spanish

The Maid (Spanish: La Nana) is a 2009 comedy-drama film, directed by Sebastián Silva and co-written by Silva and Pedro Peirano. A Chilean-Mexican co-production, the film won numerous awards since its premiere at the 25th Annual Sundance Film Festival. The film has had much critical acclaim, particularly for Catalina Saavedra's award-winning performance as the lead character.

== Plot synopsis ==
For over 23 years, Raquel (Saavedra) has worked as the maid for the Valdes family. She shows utmost loyalty and respect to her employers, Pilar (Celedón) and Edmundo (Goic). Raquel gets along well with their teenage son, Lucas (Agustín Silva), but often clashes with their headstrong daughter, Camila (García-Huidobro).

When Raquel begins to suffer from dizzy spells caused by her excessive use of chlorine for household cleaning, Pilar decides to hire additional maids to assist Raquel with her daily chores. However, Raquel fiercely guards her territory and resents the newcomers, engaging in a series of increasingly desperate attempts to drive them away. This includes the younger maid, Lucy (Loyola), as Raquel tries to maintain her position in the household.

== Cast ==
- Catalina Saavedra as Raquel
- Claudia Celedón as Pilar
- Alejandro Goic as Edmundo
- Mariana Loyola as Lucy
- Agustín Silva as Lucas
- Andrea García-Huidobro as Camila
- Anita Reeves as Sonia
- Delfina Guzmán as The Grandmother
- Luis Dubó as Eric
- Gloria Canales as Lucy's mom
- Luis Wigdorsky as Lucy's dad

== Reception ==
=== Critical reception ===
Critics have responded very positively to the film. On Rotten Tomatoes the film has a 93% approval rating, based on 75 reviews, with an average rating of 7.6/10. The website's critical consensus reads, "Catalina Saavedra's devastating performance would be reason enough to see The Maid but Sebastian Silva's empathetic direction and finely tuned script only add to the movie's pleasing heft." On Metacritic, the film has a weighted average score of 82 out of 100, based on 24 critics, indicating "universal acclaim".

Film critic David Parkinson called it "an exceptional study of the emotional investment that domestics make in the families they serve. Saavedra is mesmerizing as she shifts from subservient to scheming." Chicago Sun-Times film critic Roger Ebert described the film as a "unpredictable, naturalistic gem."

=== Accolades ===
According to the National Board of Review, The Maid was one of 2009's five best Best Foreign-Language Films; also, it was nominated for the 67th Annual Golden Globe Awards consideration honoring 2009 achievements for the same category, and "AyAyAyAy" (the film's main theme song) was one of the 63 songs from eligible feature-length motion pictures contending for nominations in the Original Song category for the 82nd Academy Awards.

Despite the film's great success, the film was not chosen as Chile's submission to the 82nd Academy Awards. Instead, Miguel Littín's Dawson Isla 10 was sent, but the film didn't make the short-list.

Year	Event	Recipient	Award	Result
2009	Cartagena Film Festival	Sebastián Silva	Critics Award - Best Film	Won
2009	Cartagena Film Festival	Catalina Saavedra	Golden India Catalina - Best Actress	Won
2009	Cartagena Film Festival	Sebastián Silva	Golden India Catalina - Best Film	Nominated
2009	Gotham Film Awards	Gregorio González (producer); Sebastián Silva (director)	Best Feature	Nominated
2009	Gotham Film Awards	Catalina Saavedra	Breakthrough Actor/Actress	Won
2009	Off Plus Camera Film Festival Poland	Gregorio González (producer); Sebastián Silva (director)	Krakow Film Award (Best Film)	Won
2009	Sarasota Film Festival	Gregorio González (producer); Sebastián Silva (director)	Best Narrative Film	Won
2009	Fribourg International Film Festival	Sebastián Silva (director)	Talent Tape Award	Won
2009	Paris Cinema International Film Festival	Sebastián Silva (director)	Audience Award	Won
2009	Taipei Film Festival	Sebastián Silva (director)	Special Mention New Talent Competition; 3rd Audience Award	Won
2009	Latin American Film Festival	Sebastián Silva (director)	Critics Award	Won
2009	Latin American Film Festival	Sebastián Silva (director)	Elcine First Prize - Best Film	Won
2009	Sundance Film Festival Awards	Sebastián Silva (director)	Grand Jury Prize: World Cinema - Dramatic	Won
2009	Sundance Film Festival Awards	Catalina Saavedra	Special Jury Prize (For Acting): World Cinema - Dramatic	Won
2009	Satellite Awards 2009	Catalina Saavedra	Best Actress – Motion Picture Drama	Nominated
2009	Satellite Awards 2009	Sebastián Silva (director)	Best Foreign Language Film	Won Tied with Broken Embraces
2010	NAACP Image Awards	Sebastián Silva (director)	Best Foreign Language Film	Nominated
2010	Golden Globes Awards	Sebastián Silva (director)	Best Foreign Language Film	Nominated

Awards
Preceded by The King of Ping Pong	Sundance Grand Jury Prize: World Cinema Dramatic; 2009	Succeeded by Animal Kingdom
