= Willy Semler =

Chilean actor and theater director

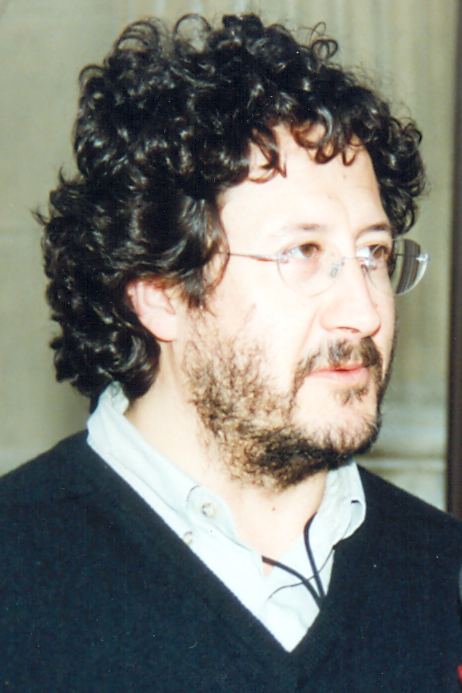
- Semler in 2001
- Born: Guillermo Semler Aguirre; January 16, 1959 (age 67); Santiago de Chile, Chile
- Education: University of Chile
- Occupations: Actor, theatre director
- Awards: APES (1993)

Guillermo Semler Aguirre (born January 16, 1959, in Santiago) better known as Willy Semler is a Chilean actor of films, theatre, television and theater director.

He is known for having played Esperanza in the popular play La negra Ester, one of the most classic plays of chilean history. In cinema, he has had roles in films such as Johnny cien pesos and El desquite, while on television he has been in successful telenovelas for over 40 years, in productions such as Amor a domicilio (1995), Adrenalina (1996), Playa salvaje (1997), Fuera de control (1999), Los treinta (2005), and Pacto de sangre (2018) among many others. He worked as an announcer on Radio La Clave in the program "Enradiados" (2016–2017).

He studied in the Universidad de Chile.

== Filmography ==
=== Films ===
Films
| Year | Film | Character | Director |
|---|---|---|---|
| 1993 | Entrega total | | Leo Kocking |
| 1994 | Johnny cien pesos | Freddy | Gustavo Graef Marino |
| 1996 | Mi último hombre | Pedro | Tatiana Gaviola |
| 1999 | El desquite | Pablo Casas-Cordero | Andrés Wood |
| 2002 | Eternal Blood | Padre M | Jorge Olguín |
| 2006 | Fuga | Padre de Eliseo | Pablo Larraín |
| 2008 | Chile puede | Patricio | Ricardo Larraín |
| 2008 | Papá o 36 mil juicios de un mismo suceso | Miguel | Leonardo Medel |
| 2011 | Dios me libre | | Martín Duplaquet |
| 2013 | El derechazo | Andrés Sandwitch | Lalo Prieto |
| 2017 | Crisis | Roberto del Río | Martin Pizarro |
| 2018 | American Huaso | Dyango Palma | Diego García-Huidobro |
| 2020 | Jailbreak Pact | Warden Jorquera | David Albala |
| 2020 | La Verónica | Fiscal | Leonardo Medel |
| 2022 | The Announced Death of Willy Semler | Willy | Benjamin Rojo |
| 2022 | My Mother-in-law Hates Me | Alonso | Andres Feddersen |

=== Telenovelas ===
Telenovela
| Year | Telenovela | Role | Channel |
|---|---|---|---|
| 1981 | Villa Los Aromos | Avelino Mellado | TVN |
| 1986 | La dama del balcón | Wolfgang Veidt | TVN |
| 1986 | La villa | Valentín Montes | TVN |
| 1987 | Mi nombre es Lara | Álvaro | TVN |
| 1993 | Ámame | Rodrigo Silva | TVN |
| 1994 | Top Secret | Vicente Palacios | Canal 13 |
| 1995 | Amor a domicilio | Jerry Lewis / Leopoldo "Polo" Gumucio | Canal 13 |
| 1996 | Adrenalina | Alfredo Villagra | Canal 13 |
| 1997 | Playa salvaje | Renato Santa María | Canal 13 |
| 1998 | Marparaíso | Gonzalo Moreno | Canal 13 |
| 1999 | Fuera de control | Rafael Cervantes | Canal 13 |
| 2000 | Sabor a ti | Maximiliano Sarmiento | Canal 13 |
| 2001 | Piel canela | Sergio Novoa | Canal 13 |
| 2003 | 16 | Manuel Arias "El Chacal" | TVN |
| 2004 | Tentación | Bruno Alcázar | Canal 13 |
| 2004–2005 | Ídolos | Mario Leyton | TVN |
| 2005 | 17 | Manuel Arias "El Chacal" | TVN |
| 2005 | Los treinta | Javier Alcalde | TVN |
| 2006 | Entre medias | Raimundo Montes | TVN |
| 2007 | Vivir con 10 | Exequiel Amenábar | Chilevisión |
| 2008 | Mala conducta | Pelayo Bobadilla | Chilevisión |
| 2009 | Sin anestesia | Emiliano Montalbán | Chilevisión |
| 2010 | Manuel Rodríguez | Mateo Segura y Ruiz | Chilevisión |
| 2011 | Infiltradas | Aldo Zubizarrieta | Chilevisión |
| 2012–2013 | La sexóloga | Custodio Curilén | Chilevisión |
| 2012 | Maldita | Alfonso Ferrer | Mega |
| 2013 | Socias | Rubén Schuster | TVN |
| 2018–2019 | Pacto de sangre | Manuel Tapia | Canal 13 |

=== TV series ===
TV series
| Year | Serie | Role | Channel |
|---|---|---|---|
| 1996 | Vecinos puertas adentro | Rolando | Canal 13 |
| 2002 | Más que amigos | Padre de Bárbara | Canal 13 |
| 2004 | Geografía del deseo | Martín | TVN |
| 2005 | La vida es una lotería | René | TVN |
| 2005–2006 | Tiempo final: en tiempo real | Mariano / Manuel | TVN |
| 2007–2009 | Infieles | Varios personajes | Chilevisión |
| 2008–2012 | Teatro en Chilevisión | Varios personajes | Chilevisión |
| 2010 | Cartas de mujer | Coronel Raúl González | Chilevisión |
| 2012 | Amar y morir en Chile | Perfecto Oviedo | Chilevisión |
| 2013 | Maldito corazón | Alberto | Chilevisión |
| 2015 | Los años dorados | Oficial Garrido | TV+ |
| 2015 | Juana Brava | Bernardo Maureira | TVN |
| 2016 | Bala loca | General Jorge Arismendi | Chilevisión |
| 2017 | 12 días: La muerte de Pinochet | Manuel | Chilevisión |
| 2017 | 62: Historia de un mundial | Raúl Colombo | TVN |
