= Magic Magic (2013 film) =

- Film poster
- Directed by: Sebastián Silva
- Written by: Sebastián Silva
- Produced by: David Bernad; Frida Torresblanco; Christine Vachon; Mike White
- Starring: Juno Temple; Emily Browning; Michael Cera; Catalina Sandino Moreno
- Cinematography: Christopher Doyle; Glenn Kaplan
- Edited by: Jacob Craycroft; Alex Rodríguez
- Music by: Daniel Bensi; Saunder Jurriaans
- Production companies: Braven Films; Killer Films
- Distributed by: Destination Films; Sony Pictures Home Entertainment
- Release dates: January 17, 2013 (Sundance); May 23, 2013 (Cannes); August 16, 2013 (United States)
- Running time: 98 minutes
- Countries: United States; Chile
- Language: English

Magic Magic is a 2013 psychological thriller film written and directed by Sebastián Silva and starring Juno Temple, Emily Browning, Michael Cera, and Catalina Sandino Moreno.

The film premiered on January 22, 2013, at the 2013 Sundance Film Festival. It was also played at the Directors' Fortnight at the 2013 Cannes Film Festival.

== Plot ==
Alicia (Juno Temple) arrives in Chile for her first international trip to join her cousin Sara (Emily Browning), who is studying there. They plan to embark on a road trip with Sara's boyfriend Agustín (Agustín Silva), his sister Bárbara (Catalina Sandino Moreno), and his friend Brink (Michael Cera). However, Sara gets an urgent call about an important exam and has to leave Alicia behind. Despite feeling anxious about being left alone with the group, Alicia is comforted with the assurance that Sara will return the next day. Meanwhile, the rest of the group continues their journey to the island where they'll be staying.

During the trip, unexpected events leave Alicia feeling uneasy about her presence among the group. Upon arriving at the island, Alicia becomes increasingly isolated due to the absence of phone signal and Brink's annoying behavior. The next morning, Agustín invites Alicia on a walk, and they witness Brink killing a macaw with an air rifle. Upset, Alicia runs off and manages to reach Sara on the phone, who informs her that she won't be able to join them for another day. Feeling frustrated, Alicia returns to Agustín and Brink and encounters a sheepdog that later disgusts her by humping her leg. Brink laughs at her reaction, and Agustín chases the dog away.

That night, Brink continues to mock Alicia about the dog incident and playfully wrestles with her until she kicks him in the nose out of fear. Feeling unwelcome and humiliated, Alicia calls Sara again and tearfully reveals her discomfort. Sara confesses that she didn't have a test but had an abortion instead. Later, the group goes cliff diving, but Alicia becomes extremely fearful and has a vertigo attack. Despite Sara's concern about Alicia's lack of sleep, the group proceeds with their plans. That night, Agustín hypnotizes Alicia, but she snaps out of it when Brink tells her to put her hand in the fireplace and gets burned.

After Alicia's hypnosis incident, Sara puts her to bed and leaves with Agustín. Alicia then begins to suffer from hallucinations of Sara and Brink in her room. Later that night, she hears the others talking about her disparagingly and finds the air rifle in Brink's room, but ends up forcing his face into her crotch before leaving. When Sara returns, she notices that Alicia has covered all the mirrors. The next day, Brink confronts Alicia, but she denies the incident. Alicia runs off and breaks down in tears in front of Melda, who takes her to her home to treat her burn. Alicia is returned to the cabin and put to bed again. Sara suggests taking Alicia to a hospital, but they discover she has escaped and consumed all of Bárbara's sleeping pills. They find her at the cliff face and try to talk her down, but she ultimately jumps in and is recovered.

The group brings Alicia to Melda after she suffers a mental breakdown. Melda takes her to the island's only healer, who performs an ancient ritual involving a lamb and music. Alicia becomes calm and while distracted by the ritual, Sara doesn't notice when Alicia chokes on the tea, shes giving her. Agustín notices Alicia's stopped breathing, checks her pulse, and along with Sara, is convinced she has died, but the healer assures Sara that it's only temporary. That she'll wake up after a brief coma, and pushes Agustín away. The film concludes with the group taking Alicia to the mainland on a motorboat as Sara tries to revive her.

== Cast ==
- Juno Temple as Alicia, a Californian and Sara's cousin
- Emily Browning as Sara, cousin to Alicia and a student living in Chile
- Michael Cera as Brink, Agustín's flamboyant schoolmate and friend
- Catalina Sandino Moreno as Bárbara, Agustín's older sister
- Agustín Silva as Agustín, Sara's boyfriend

== Reception ==
Magic Magic received mixed to positive reviews from critics. Review aggregator website Rotten Tomatoes reports that 68% of critics have given the film positive reviews, based on 41 reviews. The website's consensus reads, "Magic Magic finds writer-director Sebastián Silva in familiar risk-taking form, ably abetted by Juno Temple and a smartly assembled ensemble cast." On Metacritic, the film has a 59 out of 100 rating based on 7 critics, indicating "mixed or average reviews".

== Accolades ==
Magic Magic won the Sitges Award for Best Actress for Temple.

== See also ==
- Cinema of Chile
