= Sebastián Silva (director) =

Chilean film director, actor and musician (born 1979)

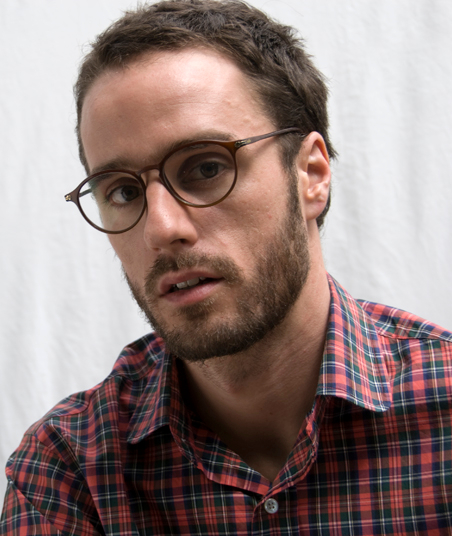
- Silva in 2008
- Born: Sebastián Silva Irarrázaval; 9 April 1979 (age 47); Santiago, Chile
- Education: Colegio del Verbo Divino
- Occupations: Filmmaker; musician; artist; actor
- Years active: 2006–present

Sebastián Silva Irarrázaval (born 9 April 1979) is a Chilean director, actor, screenwriter, painter, and musician.

== Early years ==
The second of seven brothers, Sebastián Silva was born in Santiago on 9 April 1979. After graduating from the Catholic Colegio del Verbo Divino school in Santiago, he spent a year studying filmmaking at the Escuela de Cine de Chile ('Film School of Chile') before leaving to study animation in Montreal at the age of 20. Here, he mounted the first gallery exhibition of his illustrations and started the band CHC (Spanish: Congregación de Hermanos Contemplativos, 'Congregation of Contemplative Brothers'), which went on to record three albums

Silva's second illustration show brought him in contact with Hollywood but a "frustrating period" in Los Angeles, spent pitching to Steven Spielberg and others, brought no tangible results. Leaving Hollywood, Silva started two more bands, Yaia and Los Mono, the latter of which was signed by British record label Sonic360. He exhibited his art in New York City while writing the script for what would become his first feature, La Vida Me Mata ('Life Kills Me', written with Pedro Peirano).

== Career ==
=== From first films to Sundance ===
Back in Chile, Silva recorded a solo album, Iwannawin & Friends and directed his debut feature, Life Kills Me. Released in 2007 by Chilean production company Fabula, Life Kills Me went on to win Best Film at the Chilean Pedro Sienna Awards in 2008.

In February 2008, setting aside a script based on his trip to Hollywood, Silva wrote (with Pedro Peirano) and directed his next film: The Maid. The film, released in 2009, told the story of a maid trying to keep her job after having served a family for 23 years. It has won multiple awards, including the Grand Jury Prize - World Cinema Dramatic at the 2009 Sundance Film Festival, and was nominated for Best Foreign Language Film at the 2010 Golden Globes Awards and the 2010 NAACP Image Awards. Film critic David Parkinson called the film "an exceptional study of the emotional investment that domestics make in the families they serve".

=== International recognition ===
Silva partnered with Pedro Peirano again to write his next film, Old Cats, which premiered in 2010 at the Valdivia International Film Festival in Chile and at the New York Film Festival in the United States. He then made his TV debut in 2012 when he wrote, directed and produced the HBO short-form TV comedy show The Boring Life of Jacqueline.

The success of The Maid took Silva to Sundance again in 2013 to premiere two new films, Magic Magic and Crystal Fairy, both starring indie actor Michael Cera. Silva won the Sundance Directing Award: World Cinema - Dramatic for Crystal Fairy and the Los Angeles Times described Magic Magic as "an exploration of insanity, selfishness and emotional brutality". Silva told the LA Times that Cera's character in Magic Magic is "one of my favorite characters I've created in a movie."

Silva's 2015 film Nasty Baby, in which he played the lead role as well as directing, premiered at the 2015 Sundance Film Festival and was screened in the Panorama section of the 65th Berlin International Film Festival, where it was named winner of the Teddy Award for best LGBT-themed feature film, with a statement stating the film "symbolizes major divides that cut across the LGBT spectrum and across society";

His 2023 black comedy with Jordan Firstman, Rotting in the Sun, premiered at the Sundance Film Festival and screened at Outfest, and included substantial full frontal nudity and unsimulated public gay sex.

== Personal life ==
Silva is openly gay, coming out after high school. He has spoken about the difficulties he experienced growing up at school: "I did suffer. I went to a private school, a very tough school ruled by men only, and the law of the jungle. I remember having feminine impulses and just suppressing them. To survive, I guess." He rejects that films should be categorised as queer just because it has gay characters. saying in 2015:

Why is this movie an LGBT movie just because there is a gay couple? There are also black characters in this movie, so is it a black film? Of course it's not. I personally feel that it’s unfair to minorities that their participation in a movie creates a classification like, 'Oh, that's a queer movie because there just so happens to be a gay couple in it'. When you make a movie with a straight couple, it isn't a straight movie, is it?

... We should be normalizing homosexuality and normalizing blackness in a way that you can't pinpoint so easily. Why do they want to define me as a gay director? Is the fact that I like dick so important to everyone that they need to say that before anything else? Is the fact that I was born in South America so important to everyone that they need to say that before anything else? There are aspects of myself that are way more articulate and make me way more of who I am than being a homosexual who was born in Latin America.

== Filmography ==
=== Director and screenplay ===
- Life Kills Me (2007) with Pedro Peirano
- The Maid (2009)
- Old Cats (2010) with Pedro Peirano
- The Boring Life of Jacqueline (TV series, 2012)
- Crystal Fairy and the Magical Cactus (Crystal Fairy y el Cactus Mágico, 2013)
- Magic Magic (2013)
- Nasty Baby (2015)
- "Dance Dance Dance" in Madly (2016)
- Tyrel (2018)
- Fistful of Dirt (2018)
- Rotting in the Sun (2023)

=== Actor ===
- Life Kills Me (2007) as Ghost 1
- 31 minutos, la película (2008)
- Nasty Baby (2014)
- Rotting in the Sun (2023)

== Discography ==
=== CHC ===
- Bastante real (2003)
- What it is es lo que es (2004)
- La cosa (2007)

=== With Yaia ===
- Goor modning (2004)

=== With Los Mono ===
- Somos los que estamos (2007)

=== Solo ===
- Iwannawin & Friends (2005)

== Awards ==
- Pedro Sienna Awards 2008: Best Film, Life Kills Me
- Sundance Festival: Sundance Grand Jury Prize (2009)The Maid
- Altazor Awards 2010: Best Director, The Maid
- Pedro Sienna Awards 2010: Best Screenplay, Old Cats (with Pedro Peirano)
- Sundance Festival: Directing Award: World Cinema - Dramatic (2013), Crystal Fairy
- Teddy Award, Berlin International Film Festival: Best feature film (2015), Nasty Baby

=== Nominations ===
- 2009 Gotham Awards: Best Film, The Maid (with Gregorio González)
- 2010 Golden Globes Awards: Best Foreign Language Film, The Maid
- 2010 Independent Spirit Awards: Best Foreign Film, The Maid
- 2014 Independent Spirit Awards: John Cassavetes Award, Crystal Fairy (with Juan de Dios Larraín & Pablo Larraín)
