= 31 Minutos (soundtrack) =

31 minutos

Soundtrack album by 31 Minutos
- Released: July 8, 2003
- Recorded: 2002–2003
- Genre: Pop; Children's music
- Length: 32:29
- Label: La Oreja; Aplaplac
- Producer: Pablo Ilabaca; Álvaro Díaz

31 Minutos chronology
31 minutos (2003)	31 Canciones de Amor y una Canción de Guaripolo (2004)

Singles from 31 Minutos
- 1. "Baila sin César" Released: June 30, 2003

31 Minutos (Spanish for "31 Minutes") is the first soundtrack album of the Chilean television series 31 Minutos, released on July 8, 2003, under the label La Oreja. It mainly contains the soundtrack for the first season of the show.

The song "Baila sin César" was chosen for radio broadcast, and had high rotation during 2003. In 2007 it was released in Mexico under the EMI record label, being the first time that the album was published outside of Chile.

== Background ==
After winning a fund from the National Television Council to produce the program 31 minutos, Álvaro Díaz and Pedro Peirano, both journalists graduated from the University of Chile, came up with the idea of including a segment in the project where a musical classification was presented. Initially, Díaz wanted to use songs by Florcita Motuda, but Peirano was inclined to compose them and recommended Pablo Ilabaca, guitarist of the funk rock group Chancho en Piedra at that time, to develop them. Ilabaca showed them a CD with tracks created by him, but that had no place in his band. The first of that sample was the instrumental, "31 minutos". Díaz and Peirano were delighted with this, and they chose it as the theme for the series' entry.

== Composition ==
The album consists of several of the songs present in the Policarpo Avendaño's musical classification from the first season. Rodrigo Salinas and Daniel Castro, members of the La nueva gráfica chilena collective, added the lyrics of some songs.. "Tangananica Tangananá" is one of them; At first Díaz rejected it because it didn't sound like anything, but Peirano and Castro reused it to give life to a story between the dispute between two brothers to choose which is the best word: Tangananica or Tangananá.

The instrumental of "Lala" was composed by Ilabaca with DJ Raff, and "Mi equilibrio espiritual" was performed by him for his band Chancho en Piedra on the album El tinto elemento, but his brother and also a member Felipe Ilabaca was not convinced.

Álvaro Díaz composed "Mi muñeca me habló". During the recordings of a side project, the creators of 31 minutos went to eat seafood at a local, but the next day it gave both of them hepatitis. Peirano was not as affected as Díaz, who had to rest at his house for a while. In the room where he rested there was a doll, and as a result of the fever generated by the disease he was inspired to write it.

On Track 31, after the goodbye of Chancho Irrarazabal there is a Juanin Juan Harry backwards message saying "Yo enterré a Tulio" (I Buried Tulio). This is a reference to The Beatles' "Strawberry Fields Forever", which contains the supposed backwards message "I buried Paul".

== Release ==
31 minutos came to light on the open channel Televisión Nacional de Chile on March 15, 2003, and during the passing of the chapters the share of the state signal increased and became a success. It also helped develop other ideas for the children's block. The Aplaplac production company, owned by Díaz and Peirano, signed a contract with the Agosín company to launch official products. Among them were stuffed animals, and two best-selling DVDs: Lo mejor de 31 minutos and Los Policarpo Top Top Top Awards, which soon became the best-selling video discs in Chilean history. With this achievement they surpassed Estadio Nacional by Los Prisioneros, a record that held this position in 2002. Jorge González, vocalist of Los Prisioneros, stated that he was a fan of 31 minutos, and he recorded his own versions of "Baila sin César" and "Tangananica Tangananá" for the album En las raras tocatas nuevas de la Rock & Pop.

Along with all the aforementioned products, the album, 31 minutos, was released under the independent label La Oreja. The album was produced by Díaz and Ilabaca, and was mastered along with dialogues from the episodes and characters. Ten thousand copies were pressed, of which half were reserved by record stores in the country. On July 8, 2003, the day of its release, it sold the remaining copies in less than two hours, obtaining the gold record certification in less than 24 hours. The double-disc prize Platinum was delivered in the conversation program De Pe a Pa, hosted by Pedro Carcuro, for more than 50,000 copies sold. In a few months, it surpassed 120,000 copies sold, becoming a six-times platinum disc, and at the end of 2003, 140,000 copies were already registered, very close to the 160,000 copies sold by the album México Lindo y Querido by the singer María José Quintanilla, the best-selling album of the year.

After its internationalization and broadcast on Channel 11, the record label, EMI Music Mexico reissued the CD for the Mexican Republic in 2007, and Feria Music in 2012 with a different aspect. However, when this last went bankrupt. Aplaplac, the production company of 31 minutos, edited the album independently again, and in November 2014 released the compact for the first time on vinyl, together with the Mexican label No vision. Music factor made it again in this format, in 2016, after being discontinued again. In 2019 and in conversation with the television channel 13C, Pablo Ilabaca detailed the sales of the album until that year: 285,000 copies distributed.

== Critical reception ==
Professional ratings
Review scores
Source	Rating
AllMusic	4/5 stars

In AllMusic, Evan C. Gutierrez praised the album saying that is "impishly fun, innocent, childlike and yet very hip" and "the styles are produced with equal amounts of whimsy and musical savvy." EMOL added the album to its selection of 35 fundamental albums of Chilean popular music.

== Track listing ==
No.	Title	Lead vocals	Length
1.	"¿Qué te pasa Policarpo?" ("What's Wrong Policarpo?")	Spoken.
2.	"31 Minutos." ("31 Minutes (Main Theme).")	Instrumental	1:01
3.	"En el Continente Negro." ("In the Black Continent.")	Tulio and His Friends.
4.	"**Lala.***"	**Lolo.**	1:32
5.	"Joven de espíritu." ("Spiritually Young.")	Spoken.
6.	"**Señora, devuélvame la pelota o si no, no sé que haré.**" ("Miss, Return My Ball or Else I Won't Know What to do")	**Pepe Lota**	3:07
7.	"Terrible de Frío." ("Very Cold.")	Los Monos Locos (The Crazy Monkeys).
8.	"**Bailan Sin Cesar.**" ("Dance Without Cesar.**")	**Latidos Latinos Urbanos Emergentes Hip Hop Hermano Brother (LLUEHHHB).**	1:55
9.	"El Baño Molestoso." ("The Annoying Bathroom.")	Instrumental
10.	"Martín." ("Martín.")	Spoken.
11.	"**Tangananica-Tangananá.**"	**The Guarennes Brothers.**	1:55
12.	"Si yo Fuera Rico." ("If I Were a Rich Man.")	Tulio And His Friends.
13.	"**Mi Muñeca Me Habló.**" ("My Doll Spoke to Me.")	**Flor Bovina.**	2:01
14.	"En una Cómoda Cómoda de Ciudad Cómoda." ("In a Comfortable Cabinet Of Cabinet City.**")	Spoken.
15.	"Calcetín con Rombos Man." ("Argyle Sock Man.")	Instrumental
16.	"No Toquen esa Consola." ("Don't Touch That Console.")	Spoken.
17.	" **Me Cortaron Mal El Pelo.**" ("They Cut Wrong My Hair.")	**Chascoberto.**	1:18
18.	"Thank you Policarp For Your Information."	Spoken.
19.	"**They Cut Wrong My Hair.**" (English version of number 17.)	**Chascobert.**	1:18
20.	"Yo vengo de Titirilquén." ("I Come from Titirilquén.")	Patana and the rest of the Crew.
21.	"La Estrella de Chañaral." ("The Chañaral Star.")	Spoken.
22.	"**Mi Equilibrio Espiritual**." ("My Spiritual Balance.")	**Freddy Turbina**.	2:31
23.	"Los Títeres (Presentando "El Hombre de Plástico)." ("The Puppets (Presenting "The Plastic Man").")	The Puppets.
24.	"**Diente Blanco, no te Vayas**." ("White Tooth, Don't Go.")	**John Quijada**	1:42
25.	"Tengo Miedo." ("I'm Scared.")	Spoken.
26.	"Mico, El Micófono." ("Mico, the Micophone.")	Instrumental
27.	"Situación Compleja de Sequedad." ("Complex Situation of Dryness.")	Spoken.
28.	"**Yo Opino**." ("I Think.")	**Joe Pino & The Maniacodepresivos**.	1:27
29.	"Quiero Hacer mi show..." ("I Want to Do My Show...")	Spoken (Maguito).
30.	"**Yo Nunca vi Televisión (Luego Sí pero después no**)." ("I Never Watched TV (Then Yes but Later Not).")	**Tulio And His Friends**.	2:45
31.	"Chao" ("Bye")	Spoken

(*) Bold text indicates the actual songs.

(**) The names of tracks are Spanish tongue-twisters, so names may vary.

== Personnel ==
31 Minutos

- Pablo Ilabaca – vocals, acoustic guitar, electric guitar, keyboards, synthesizer, percussion
- Daniel Castro – vocals
- Álvaro Díaz – vocals
- Alejandra Dueñas – vocals
- Diana Massis – vocals
- Pedro Peirano – vocals
- Rodrigo Salinas – vocals

Additional musicians

- Carlos Espinoza – guitar on "Mi Muñeca me Habló" and bases on "Yo Opino"
- Erick del Valle – engineering onin "El Baño Molestoso"
- Felipe Ilabaca – bass guitar on "31 minutos"
- Pablo Aguilar – bass guitar on "Mi Muñeca me Habló"
- Fernando Aguilar – percussion on "Mi Muñeca me Habló"
- Raúl Silvestre – trombone on "Calcetín con Rombos Man"
- Sebastián Jordan – trumpet on "Calcetín con Rombos Man"

Production

- Pablo Ilabaca – Musical Producer, recording on Estudios Horripilancia
- Álvaro Díaz – Musical Producer
- Juan Manuel Egaña – Executive Producer
- Héctor Sánchez – Executive Producer
- Fernando Aguilar – recording on Multisonido, mixing on Multisonido
- Carlos Espinoza – recording on Multisonido, mixing on Multisonido
- Gonzalo González – recording on Estudios Robot Mutante
- Joaquín García – mastering on Clio
- Matías Iglesias – cover design
- Nicolás Grüm – design assistant
- Claudio Botarro – advice and graphic production
- Francisco Schultz – photos

== Charts ==
Chart (2007)	Peak position
Mexico (Billboard)	7
