= Yo nunca vi televisión =

Studio album by various artists
- Released: December 15, 2009
- Length: 42:11
- Label: Terrícolas Imbéciles
- Director: José Orduña; Juan de Dios Balbi
- Producer: Emmanuel del Real; Ro Velázquez

Yo nunca vi televisión Is a tribute album to the children's program and Chilean musical group 31 minutos, recorded by Chilean and Mexican artists under the production of Ro Velázquez and Emmanuel del Real on the Terrícolas Imbéciles label. It was released on December 15, 2009, to coincide with the premier of 31-minutos, la película. In December 2010 Universal label acquired the album, and released a second edition of the album with a total of twenty-two songs.

== History ==
The idea of making a tribute album to the Chilean television series 31 minutes arose in Mexico, a country where the program achieved popularity. Ro Velázquez (member of the musical trio Liquits) proposed to make an album tribute to the directors of the series, "as a pilgrim idea" (according to Álvaro Díaz, one of its creators), Being finally finalized.

In 2009 the rumors of the realization of the album began, And in three months thirty groups were recording, which was the reason to divide the album into two. It was finally released on December 15, 2009, on Mexican and American record stores. Mexican and Chilean artists such as Ximena Sariñana, Francisca Valenzuela, Los Bunkers, María Daniela y Su Sonido Lasser, Natalia Lafourcade, Tepetokio, Belanova, Pedropiedra and Chancho en Piedra were part of the project, That in weeks sold about 5000 copies in Mexico. The songs were published on iTunes, And it was expected to launch a special edition in Chile or bring the album, a proposal that was never fulfilled.

The compact included a cardboard disc, which promoted the exchange for an EP with discarded songs from the first edition, being able to be made from the first of January 2010 in the Mixup record stores. Promotional tours were planned for Chile and Mexico, but this didn't happen either. It was not until the end of 2010, that a second edition was published, consisting of two albums. The first contained the 14 songs of the 2009 album, and the second, the 6 songs of the exchangeable EP, 2 new tributes, interpreted by Vicente Gayo and Astro, and 10 video clips made by the same artists. The dissemination of this version was in charge of the Universal label, but the record company did not put the expected interest.

Videoclips
N.º	Title	Artist
1	Papá, te quiero	Bengala
2	Tangananica Tangananá	Liquits
3	Mi equilibrio espiritual	Los Bunkers
4	Baila sin César	Niña
5	Calurosa Navidad	Furland
6	Mi castillo de blanca arena con vista al mar	Siddhartha
7	Objeción denegada	Play & Móvil Project
8	Doggy Style	Afrodita
9	El señor interesante	Ángelo Pierattini y las Calaveras Errantes
10	Yo opino	Sinergia

== Cover ==
The cover of the first edition presents Juan Carlos Bodoque using plasticine figures in front of a letter of colored bars. The cover of the EP shows drawings of the 31-minute characters, and that of the reissue, an image similar to the first album, but with a view in a range of blue tones.

The design of the album was made in the agency Hula + Hula.

== Credits ==
- Alejandro Giacomán: Mastering
- Ro Velásquez: General Management and A&R
- José Orduña: Executive producer
- Juan de Dios Balbi: Executive producer
