= 31 Canciones de Amor y una Canción de Guaripolo =

Soundtrack album by 31 Minutos
- Released: July 28, 2004
- Genre: Soundtrack
- Length: 42:17
- Label: La Oreja Records / EMI / Feria Music / Aplaplac
- Producer: Pablo Ilabaca and Álvaro Díaz González

31 Minutos chronology
31 minutos (2003)	31 Canciones de Amor y una Canción de Guaripolo (2004)	Ratoncitos (2005)

31 canciones de amor y una canción de Guaripolo (lit: 31 love songs and one Guaripolo song) is the second studio album by 31 Minutos. It was released in Chile on July 28, 2004, under the La Oreja Records label. It was reissued in 2007 by EMI in Mexico, and in again in Chile in 2012 by Feria Music.

It has a cumbia version of the theme Yo nunca vi televisión, performed by La sonora de Tommy Rey. Following the same pattern as the previous album, the album surpassed the sale of 20,000 copies in less than a month.

== Launch and reception ==
It was launched on the Paseo Ahumada on July 31, 2004, attracting more than a thousand people. In addition, it was released on the same date as the last episode of the second season, Fiesta en la casa de Juanín. 31 canciones de amor y una canción de Guaripolo, whose title refers to the book Twenty Love Poems and a Song of Despair (by Pablo Neruda), included a sticker of the character on its cover and 3 music video. In less than 2 weeks of debuting on the market, it quickly sold out at record stores.

== Track listing ==
N.°	Title	Translated title	Lyrics	Music	Writers	Length
1	Experiencia Guaripolo	Guaripolo Experience				0:30
2	Yo nunca vi Televisión	I Never Watched Television	Daniel Castro Álvaro Díaz Pedro Peirano Rodrigo Salinas	Pablo Ilabaca		3:24
3	Al revés	Backwards				0:13
4	Severlá	Sdarwkcab	Álvaro Díaz			1:53
5	Cuéntanos	Tell Me More				0:25
6	Doggy Style		Daniel Castro Álvaro Díaz Pedro Peirano Rodrigo Salinas	Pablo Ilabaca		1:44
7	El Señor Interesante	Mr. Interesting				0:10
8	La Señora Interesante	Mrs. Interesting				2:28
9	Objeción Denegada	Objection Denied	Álvaro Díaz		Álvaro Díaz	2:11
10	Solo Dios sabe que existen	Only God Knows They Exist				0:12
11	Exterminadores de ratones	Mouse Exterminator				0:55
12	El dinosaurio Anacleto	Anacleto the Dinosaur			Pablo Ilabaca	2:25
13	Cebollón	Big Onion			Álvaro Díaz	0:16
14	Calurosa Navidad	Hot Christmas	Daniel Castro Álvaro Díaz Pedro Peirano Rodrigo Salinas	Pablo Ilabaca		2:27
15	El arrepentimiento de Juan Carlos Bodoque	The Regret of Juan Carlos Bodoque	Daniel Castro Álvaro Díaz Pedro Peirano Rodrigo Salinas	Pablo Ilabaca		2:03
16	Navidad en 31 minutos	Christmas in 31 Minutos	Daniel Castro Álvaro Díaz Pedro Peirano Rodrigo Salinas	Pablo Ilabaca		2:17
17	Boing, Boing, Boing		Rodrigo Salinas	Carlos Espinoza		0:55
18	El compromiso de Maguito	Maguito's Compromise				0:04
19	Maguito explosivo	Explosive Magician	Daniel Castro	Pablo Ilabaca		1:44
20	El conocido periodista Mario Hugo	Known Journalist Mario Hugo				0:11
21	Dimensión hermosa y desconocida	Beautiful Unknown Dimension			Pablo Ilabaca	1:13
22	Rin Raja	Ding Dong Ditch	Daniel Castro Pedro Peirano Rodrigo Salinas	Pablo Ilabaca		1:49
23	Cosas que buscan cosas	Things Looking for Things			Pablo Ilabaca	0:50
24	Nunca me he sacado un Siete	I've Never Gotten an A	Daniel Castro Álvaro Díaz Pedro Peirano Rodrigo Salinas	Pablo Ilabaca		2:00
25	Molinos de viento vampiros	Vampire Windmills				0:43
26	Sueño impossible	Impossible Dream				2:19
27	Hielito	Little Ice	Álvaro Díaz Patricio Díaz	Pablo Ilabaca		0:45
28	Papá, te quiero	Dad, I Love You	Daniel Castro Álvaro Díaz Pedro Peirano Rodrigo Salinas	Pablo Ilabaca		1:42
29	31 minutos big band				Pablo Ilabaca	2:21
30	Sopapiglobo, acompáñame con la guitarra	Sopapiglobo, Join Me with the Guitar				0:08
31	Mala	Bad	Daniel Castro Álvaro Díaz Pedro Peirano Rodrigo Salinas			2:00
