= 2003 Chilean telethon =

Charity event

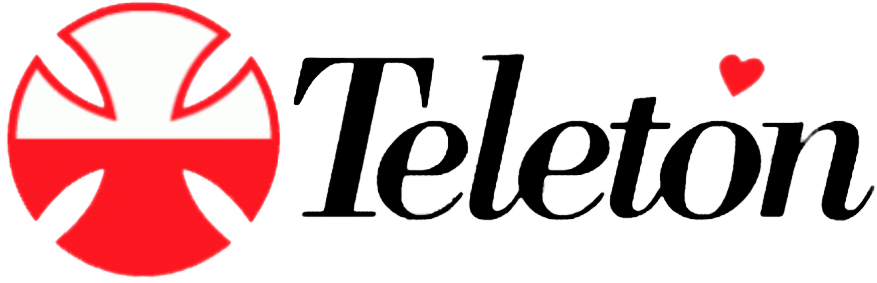
Chilean Telethon's logo

The 2003 Chilean telethon (Spanish: Teletón 2003) was the 18th version of the charity campaign held in Chile since 1978, which took place on November 21–22, 2003. As in the previous year the theme of this version was "The Telethon is Yours" (La Teletón es tuya). The amount of money taken during the day suggested the goal would not be achieved, in the end it required a cash assistance by the Government of Chile to meet the goal. The poster boy chosen for the event was Camilo Valverde.

The 2003 edition marked the Teleton's silver jubilee year and much attention was given to the work that it had garnered for a quarter century.

The telethon is remembered for a testimony given by 22-year-old Daniela García, who had lost her extremities after falling from a train car.

== Computing ==
Time (UTC−3)	Amount in chilean pesos
22.13	$125.760
00.28	$480.161.706
02.15	$704.092.094
04.26	$829.450.580
06.32	$901.532.428
10.27	$1.017.728.562
13.11	$1.769.318.546
14.12	$2.094.734.237
15.15	$2.330.569.593
16.13	$2.754.802.586
17.09	$3.047.927.091
18.25	$3.328.756.383
19.14	$3.770.753.686
20.24	$4.256.043.081
21.01	$4.825.273.799
22.33	$5.808.445.162
23.06	$6.527.746.897
23.40	$7.206.179.231
00.08	$7.854.699.794
01.09	$8.687.576.723
01.30	$9.937.770.825
01.31	$10.438.770.825
01.33	$10.600.000.000

== Artists ==
=== National singers ===
- (Chile) Luis Jara
- (Chile) María José Quintanilla
- (Chile) Douglas
- (Chile) Myriam Hernández
- (Chile) Andrés De León
- (Chile) Pablo Herrera
- (Chile) La Sonora de Tommy Rey
- (Chile) Chancho en Piedra
- (Chile) Quique Neira
- (Chile) Cesar Ávila
- (Chile) Andrea Labarca
- (Chile) Ximena Abarca
- (Chile) Canal Magdalena

=== Foreigner singers ===
- (Mexico) Emmanuel
- (Puerto Rico) Chayanne
- (Mexico) Pedro Fernández
- (Colombia) Soraya
- (Spain) Amaral
- (Argentina) Bandana
- (Argentina) Mambrú
- (Argentina) Antonio Ríos
- (Bolivia) Azul Azul
- (Mexico) Yuri
- (Argentina) Los Nocheros
- (Mexico) Cristian Castro

=== Comedians ===
- Álvaro Salas
- Salomón y Tutu Tutu
- Paulo Iglesias
- La Cuatro Dientes
- Stefan Kramer
- Ricardo Meruane
- Los Indolatinos
- Arturo Ruiz-Tagle
- Bombo Fica

=== Magazine ===
- Politicians danced with the Clan Rojo
- Team Mekano

=== Children's section ===
- Cachureos
- Los Tachuelas
- Zoolo TV
- 31 Minutos
- Jessica Abudinen

=== Adult's section ===
- Moulin Rouge Musical
  - Pia Guzmán
  - María José Campos
  - Francesca Cigna
  - Adela Calderón
- Henry Churchill
- Iliana Calabró
- Marlén Olivarí

== Transmission ==
- Red Televisión
- UCV Televisión
- Televisión Nacional de Chile
- Mega
- Chilevisión
- Canal 13
- Canal Regional
