= Jani Dueñas =

Chilean actress and comedian

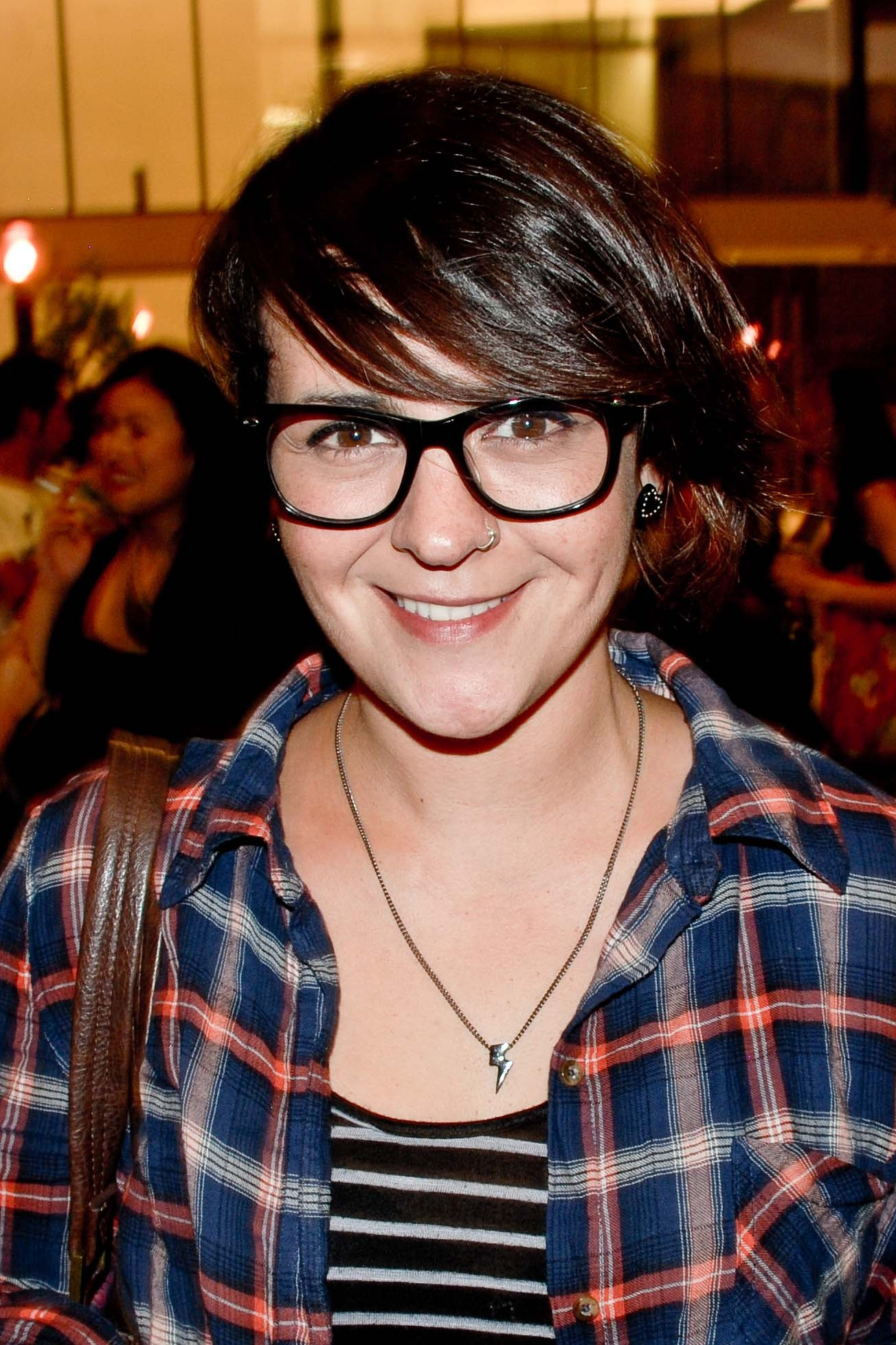
- Born: Alejandra Selma Dueñas Santander; 11 January 1975 (age 51)
- Occupations: Actress, comedian
- Father: Abraham Dueñas Strugo

Alejandra Selma Dueñas Santander (born 11 January 1975), better known as Jani Dueñas, is a Chilean actress and comedian. She is best known for her role as Patana Tufillo Triviño on the children's series 31 Minutos, and for appearing on the Chilevisión program El club de la comedia.

== Biography ==
Jani Dueñas is the daughter of Abraham Dueñas Strugo, sister of lawyer David Dueñas, and cousin of Roberto Dueñas.

She has appeared on radio, on the programs Es lo que hay and Dueñas de nada on the Internet radio station Molecula.cl. She is also a panelist for the Vía X television program Campo minado, and serves as the announcer for La divina comida on Chilevisión. In addition to her media work, she performs stand-up comedy shows, such as Hardcore, which co-starred in with José Miguel Villouta, Natalia Valdebenito, and Paloma Salas.

In 2014, Comedy Central Latin America aired the program Comedy Central Presenta: Stand-up en Chile, hosted by Nicolás Larraín and showing the routines of 14 Chilean comedians, including Dueñas.

In 2016 she presented her one-person stand-up show Ya no somos los mismos at the historic Teatro Ictus.

From 2017 to 2018 she hosted Dueñas de Salas with Paloma Salas on Big Radio, an online radio station.

In 2017 she recorded a stand-up show called Grandes fracasos de ayer y hoy, which was released on Netflix in mid-2018. The routine was selected by Time magazine as one of the 10 best stand-up comedy specials of the year.

On 26 February 2019 she performed at the 60th Viña del Mar International Song Festival, the same night as singers Marc Anthony and David Bisbal. Her routine was loudly booed by the public, so she had to wrap up the set early.

== Political career ==
In 2016, Dueñas joined Democratic Revolution.

== Works ==
=== Radio ===
- Es lo que hay (2008–2012), Radio ADN
- Más allá del fútbol (2013), FM Tiempo
- Dueñas de nada (2015), Molécula.cl
- El nuevo taco (2015), Radio Universo
- Dueñas de Salas (2017–2018), Big Radio

=== Books ===
- Gatos gordos, Piscolas y otras voces que me persiguen (2012), Planeta, ISBN 9789562476539

=== Dubbing ===
- Las vacaciones de Tulio, Patana y el pequeño Tim (2009), Voice: Patana Tufillo
- 31 minutos, la película (2008), Voice: Patana Tufillo, Estrella de Lana, and TV commentator
- 31 Minutos (2003–2005, 2014), Voice: Patana and others

=== Actress ===
- Mitú (2005) as Úrsula
- Es cool (2005) as Susana
- Xfea2 (2004) as Bárbara Céspedes
- Ana y los siete (2008) as Lidia

=== Casting director ===
- Mitú (2005)
- 31 minutos

=== Television programs ===
- Conspiración Copano (voiceover)
- Sociedad de Comediantes Anónimos, Vía X (2005–2006)
- Mujeres primero (voiceover)
- El club de la comedia (2011–2012)
- Campo minado, Vía X, 2016
- La divina comida, Chilevisión (voiceover)
