= 31 Minutos =

Chilean live-action children's television show

- Genre: Children's television series; Sitcom; News satire; Musical; Surreal comedy; Black comedy; Puppetry
- Created by: Álvaro Díaz; Pedro Peirano
- Written by: Pedro Peirano; Álvaro Díaz; Daniel Castro; Rodrigo Salinas (2003–05); Patricio Díaz; Lorena Penjean; Francisco Schultz
- Directed by: Álvaro Díaz; Pedro Peirano
- Starring: Álvaro Díaz; Pedro Peirano; Rodrigo Salinas; Daniel Castro; Patricio Díaz; Alejandra Dueñas; Francisco Schultz; Fernando Solis; Héctor Velozo; Felipe Godoy
- Theme music composer: Pablo Ilabaca
- Opening theme: 31 minutos
- Composers: Pablo Ilabaca; Angelo Pierattini (2005)
- Country of origin: Chile
- Original language: Spanish
- No. of seasons: 4
- No. of episodes: 68 (plus 2 specials)

Production
- Executive producers: Juan Manuel Egaña (2003–12); Alejandra Neumann (2013)
- Producer: Karla Estrada
- Production locations: Santiago, Chile
- Editors: Rodrigo Toro (2003–05); Julia Bande (2014); Manuela Piña (2014)
- Running time: 28–33 minutes
- Production company: Aplaplac

Original release
- Network: TVN
- Release: 15 March 2003 – 2 October 2005
- Release: 4 October – 27 December 2014

31 minutos (Spanish pronunciation: [ˈtɾeinta i ˌun miˈnutos, -j ˌun-], transl. 31 Minutes) is a Chilean children's comedy television series and virtual band created by the production company Aplaplac, founded by Álvaro Díaz, Pedro Peirano, and Juan Manuel Egaña. It premiered on March 15, 2003, on Televisión Nacional de Chile (TVN). The show is presented as a satirical news program hosted by the puppet character Tulio Triviño, featuring comedic reports and sketches. It incorporates educational themes with a humorous format.

During its initial run, the series aired three seasons between 2003 and 2005, along with a special appearance in the 2003 Chilean telethon and a Christmas special that same year. On March 27, 2008, a feature film adaptation titled 31 minutos, la película ("31 Minutos: the movie") was released.

After the third season, the series went on a nine-year hiatus with no new episodes produced. In 2012, Aplaplac announced that the show would return with a fourth season, which premiered on October 4, 2014, on TVN. The final original episode aired on December 27, 2014.

The series received widespread critical and audience acclaim for its clever, absurdist humor, original soundtrack, ability to address complex topics in a child-friendly manner, and its contribution to reviving Chile’s puppetry tradition.

From 2004 to 2007, the series was broadcast throughout Latin America on Nickelodeon, and beginning in 2015, it aired on Cartoon Network. In Mexico, it has also been broadcast on Canal Once and Once Niñas y Niños. The most recent season is available on Netflix in Latin America.

31 minutos has performed throughout Chile and Mexico, making the program a musical band. In 2025, it became the third puppet show to perform on NPR's Tiny Desk, being described as an "institution of Latin American children's programming."

== History ==
=== Origins and foundation of Aplaplac ===
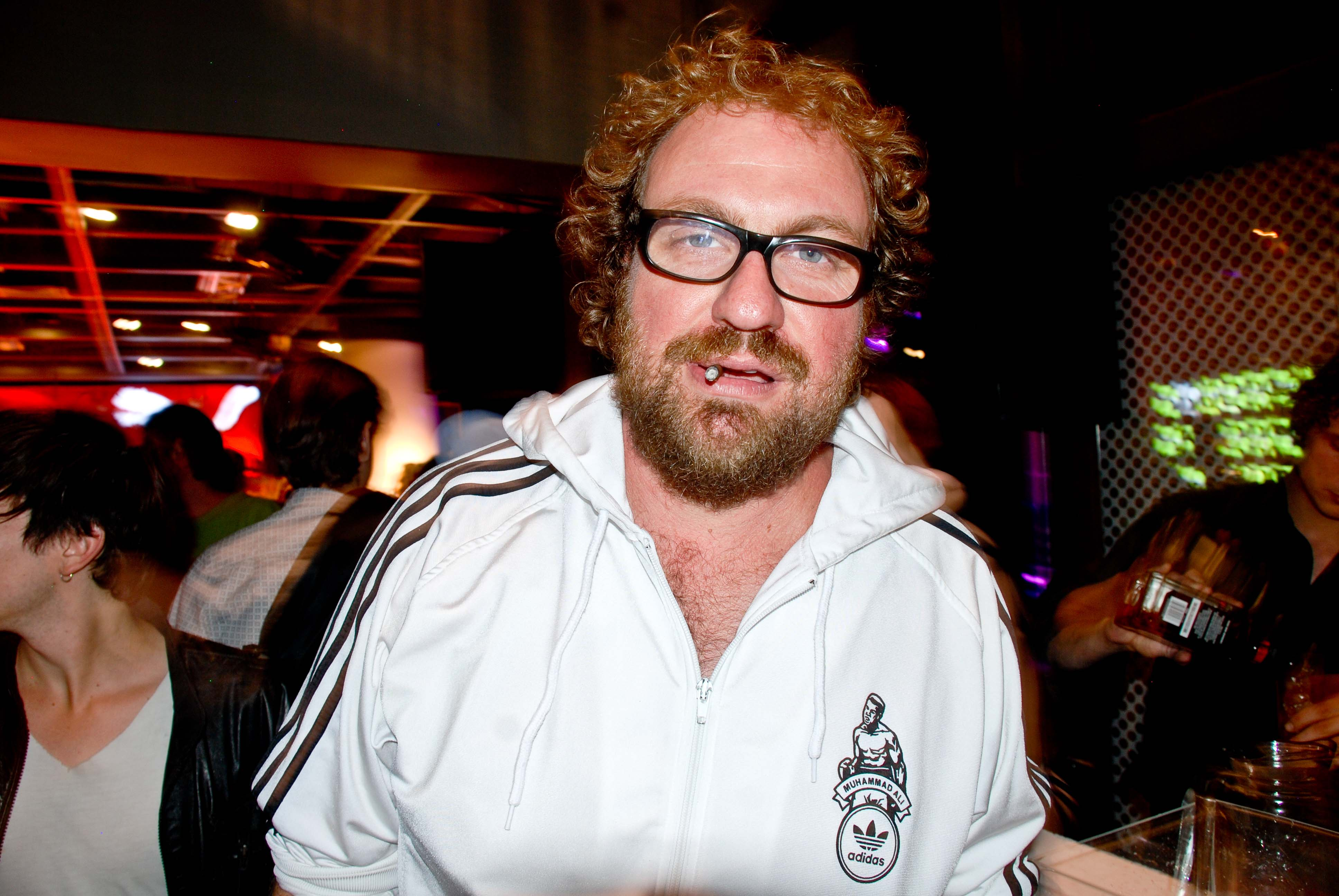
Álvaro Díaz.

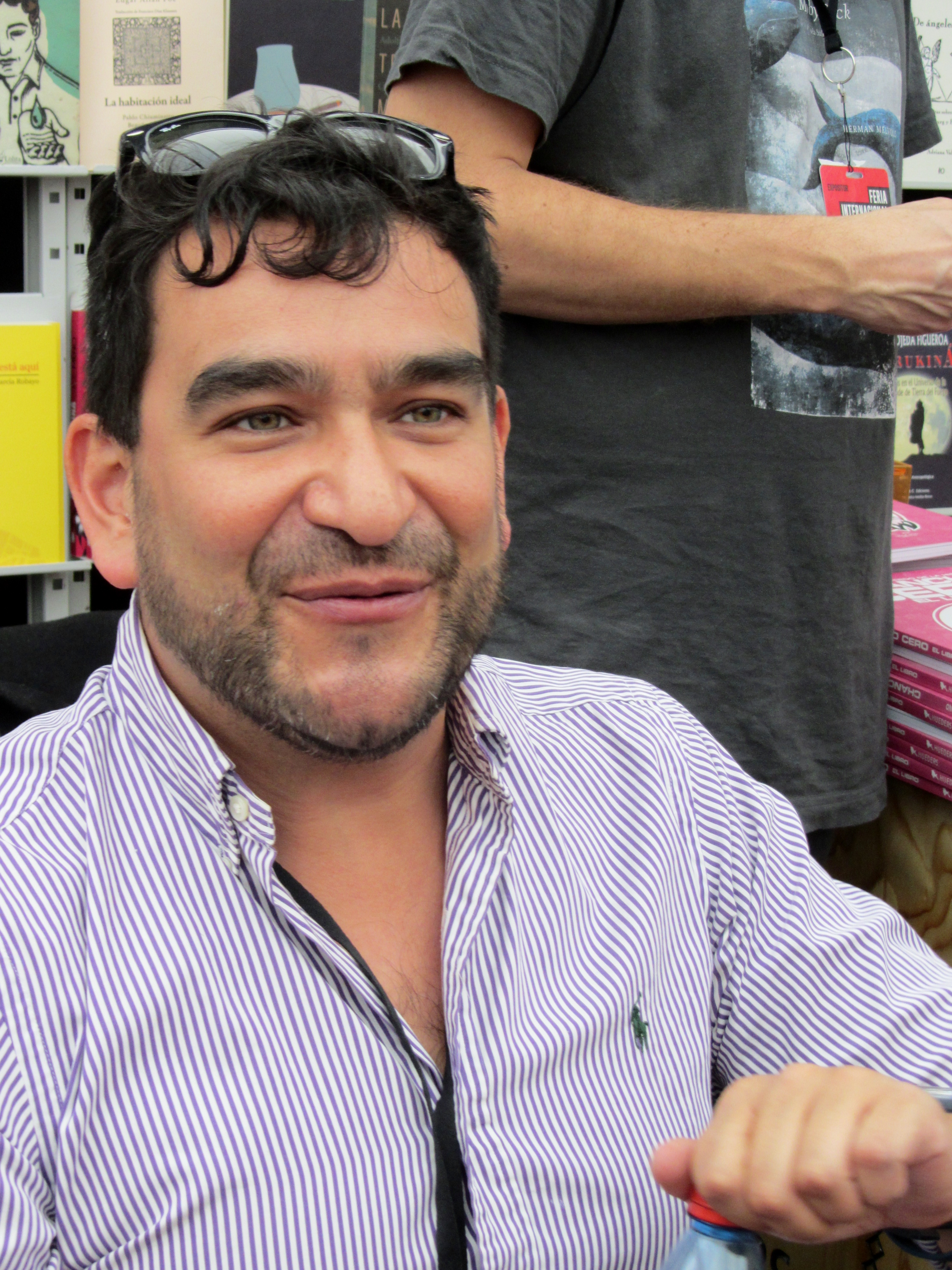
Pedro Peirano.

The origins of 31 minutos date back to 1990, when its creators Álvaro Díaz and Pedro Peirano entered the Universidad de Chile to study journalism and met each other for the first time. At first, Díaz did not meet with Peirano nor was he interested in talking to him, but they got together to do some academic work, which led both of them to realize that they shared the same sense of humor and to become friends. The two met again in 1995, when they produced programs such as Plan Z and El Factor Humano for the Chilean television channel Rock & Pop. But, contrary to their expectations, neither production prospered. In addition, the channel ceased broadcasting on December 1, 1999, leaving both Peirano and Diaz unemployed.

To get out of this situation, they founded the production company Aplaplac together with Juan Manuel Egaña. Initially, Aplaplac developed two programs: Sangre, sudor y lágrimas (Blood, Sweat and Tears)—a human-interest program bought by the sports channel PSN—and Mira tú (Look at You), a cultural program produced with funds from the Consejo Nacional de Televisión in 2001 and broadcast by Televisión Nacional de Chile in 2002.

Mira tú stood out for its quality and became the production company's letter of introduction, therefore Díaz, Peirano and Egaña applied for a second time to a CNTV competition fund in 2002, this time in the children's television category. The project presented was entitled El gabinete del Doctor Mojado (The Wet Doctor's Cabinet), and in it a fish was conducting a television program from a fishbowl. In one of its segments, a puppet reported on what was happening with the excrements in the treatment plants. Aplaplac won the contest and obtained funds to produce 21 episodes that would be broadcast on Televisión Nacional de Chile. The idea evolved into a puppet and marionette news show called "31 minutos"—a name that originated from the contest rules, which mentioned that the projects had to last half an hour. Additionally, the series' name and logo parody that of 60 minutos, a controversial newscast broadcast by TVN between 1975 and 1988, that served as a propaganda medium for the Augusto Pinochet military dictatorship. The logo also takes elements from that of the American cable network CNN's.

At the same time, Peirano worked at the Chilean newspaper El Mercurio, where he met the artist Rodrigo Salinas, who—together with the artists Daniel Castro and Matias Iglesis—formed the art collective La nueva gráfica chilena. Peirano invited them to be part of the production team for 31 minutos, leaving Salinas and Castro as scriptwriters along with Díaz and Peirano; Iglesis as art director, establishing the visual identity of the program and its characters; and Juan Manuel Egaña as executive producer of Aplaplac and 31 minutos. Due to requirements from TVN, a stable female character had to be included in the episodes. The actress and comedian Alejandra Dueñas—known from La nueva gráfica chilena—later joined the team, giving life to Patana's character.

The conviction of their creators at the beginning was to make a type of television program that they would have liked to see as children. They were fully aware that minors no longer consumed only programs that were aimed at a child audience and, based on that, came to the idea that a satire of the news had to be made. The idea also arose of inventing songs and presenting them in a musical classification. To that end, Peirano—who shared friendship with the members of the Chilean funk rock group Chancho en Piedra—introduced Pablo Ilabaca, the guitarist of that band, who brought with him a compact disc of tracks without lyrics, with which he didn't know what to do. The first instrumental Díaz and Peirano heard was the one that later became the central theme of 31 minutos, of which they quickly became fond. The rest of the tracks were used for the soundtrack of the episodes, along with other songs invented by the team. Ilabaca remained as the music producer for 31 minutos, giving rise to the Ranking Top segment, of which the character Policarpo Avendaño—interpreted by Daniel Castro—is in charge.

=== Success and internationalization ===
31 minutos made its debut on March 15, 2003. Its first episodes marked 6 points of screen rating, but as time went on it began to popularize and increase its audience to an average of 14 points. Initially it was a news show of interest to children, however, as the program progressed in its first season, it went from being a parody of news to becoming a character comedy. In view of the popularity achieved by the program in 2003, the creators agreed to produce a second and third season, this time with funds from the channel.

Part of the program's success lies in its script and characters, with hidden references to Chile's social reality. It has also been successful among young and adult audiences: the double entendre that it handles is manifested, for example, in the fact that the puppets are ironic imitations of real Chilean television characters, and recall events or television events that characterized Chile in the 1970s and 1980s.

The commercial success of the program was reflected in the appearance of several products based on it. On July 8, 2003, a studio album called 31 minutos was released, with the songs that were part of the musical classification of the first season of the program. It naturally sold out all its copies in less than a day and came to sell more than 200,000 copies. Not only was an album released, but on July 28, 2004, there was a release of 31 canciones de amor y una canción de Guaripolo, which included the songs of the second season. The name of the album refers to the book Veinte poemas de amor y una canción desesperada by Pablo Neruda. Its premiere took place in the Paseo Ahumada in Santiago and, despite not surpassing the phenomenon achieved by its predecessor, in one week it sold 20,000 copies and achieved the position of platinum record. The songs of the third season were compiled in the album Ratoncitos -in which the musician Angelo Pierattini-, which was awarded a gold record a few days after its release. In addition to the records with the songs of the program, near Christmas 2003 the home videos Lo mejor de 31 minutos and Los Policarpo Top Top Top Awards were released, which together sold more than 35,000 records. This fact made them the best selling local DVDs in the history of Chile.

The popularity obtained with the program has led its characters to be part of publicity and propagandistic campaigns in Chile. For example, Tulio and Bodoque appeared in commercial messages on the transport system of Santiago de Chile, Transantiago, to educate people on how to behave on the buses. In 2010, UNICEF released a commercial entitled "Rearmemos la vida de niños y niñas" (Let's revive the lives of children) with the aim of raising morale after the 2010 Chile earthquake. These ads show Tulio talking about the fear he feels from the tremors, but his friends from the news encourage him by telling him that together everything is better and that it is normal to feel fear. Another ad with UNICEF was about short films showing musical numbers in which Patana gives Tulio advice on how to prevent influenza. In addition, since 2015, Mario Hugo has been the face of the Santiago Metropolitan Regional Government's campaign entitled "Cuidado con el perro" (Be careful with your dog), which calls for sterilization, responsible ownership and care of dogs in public spaces.

The second season of 31 minutos made its debut on March 20, 2004 on Televisión Nacional de Chile, and simultaneously the program began to be known in other countries. On June 9, 2004, Nickelodeon's Latin American signal bought the first two seasons of the series, and premiered them on September 17 of the same year. The network broadcast the episodes until 2007. Thanks to Nickelodeon's children's audience, the program became internationalized, with good reception in countries such as Mexico and Brazil —where it was dubbed into Portuguese— On June 19, 2005, the third season began to be broadcast on TVN, consisting of only 15 episodes.

Mexico was the first country other than Chile to broadcast the series on open television when it premiered in 2006 on Canal 11. Thanks to Canal 11's broadcasting, in 2007 the EMI label released the album 31 minutos for the first time in Mexico. Both events made 31 minutos a popular hit in the country. Ro Velázquez —a member of the Mexican group Liquits— came up with the idea of producing a tribute album for the program in which fanatical artists chose their favorite song to record in their own way. The project became official with the release of "La regla primordial" —from the album Ratoncitos— versioned by Tepetokio (a duo formed by Mexican singer Rubén Albarrán and his wife Psykini) as a single. The tribute was named Yo nunca vi televisión and was published in December 2009 under the label Terricolas imbéciles. In it, fourteen Chilean and Mexican artists performed some songs from the first three albums of 31 minutos. Yo nunca vi televisión was distributed in Mexico and the southern United States, and sold about 5,000 copies in its first weeks. In addition to its physical version, it was uploaded to the iTunes store for downloading.

=== Theater plays and concerts ===
At the end of 2010, 31 minutos performed a play called Resucitando una estrella ("Resurrecting A Star"). The plot revolved around a television talent show, where Tulio Triviño and other characters were looking for the best old-fashioned artist to give them the chance to be again. These performances began as a tour of southern Chile to bring joy to people in the localities most devastated by the earthquake of February 27 that year, but some time later the play arrived in Mexico, in 2012.

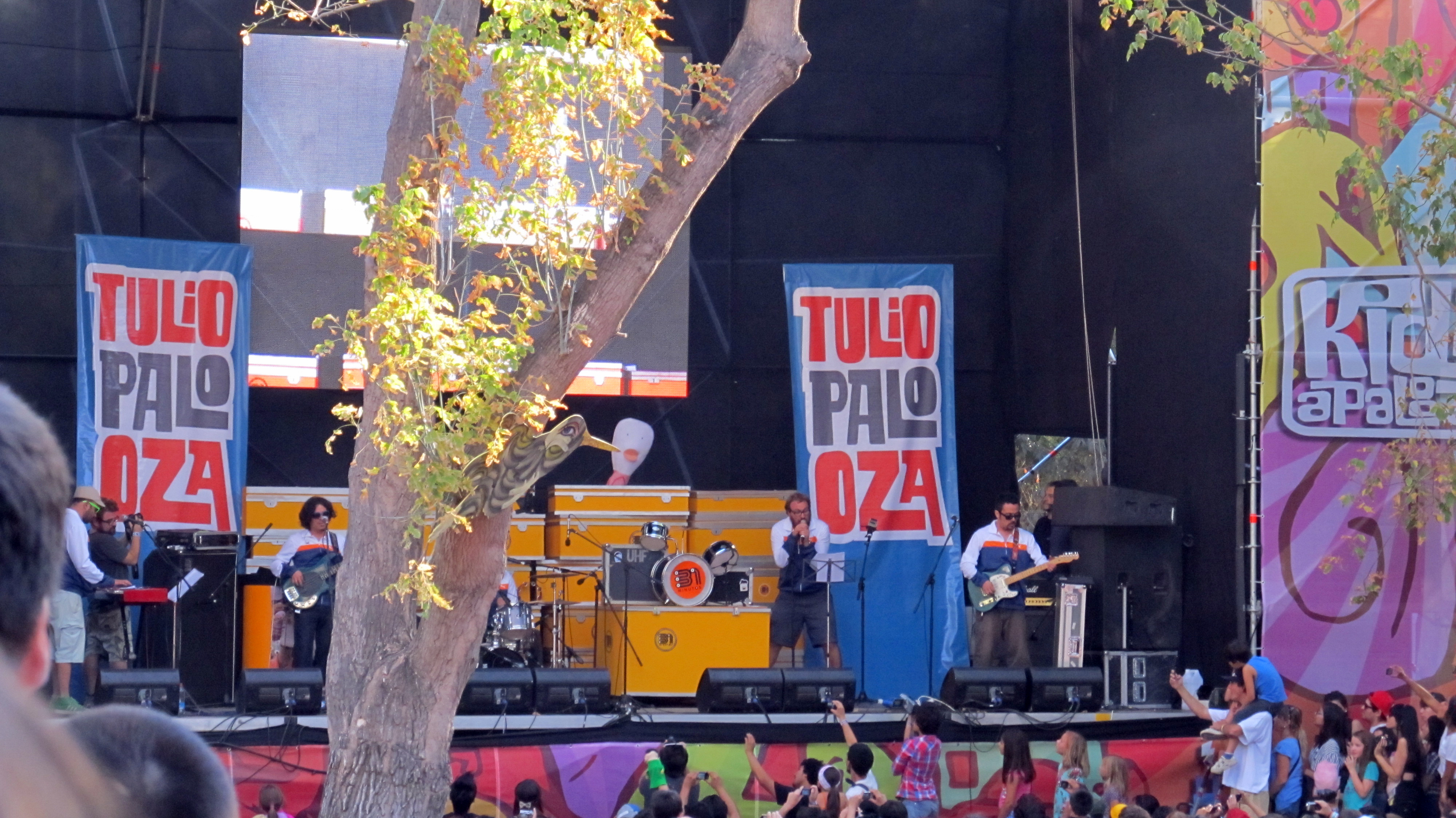
31 minutes performing at the Lollapalooza Chile 2012.

On March 31, 2012 they performed at the Lollapalooza Chile festival. Juan Manuel Egaña received an invitation and, together with Felipe Ilabaca —bass player of Chancho en Piedra—, convinced Díaz and Peirano to participate —who, at first, considered the event as a humorous one— It was such an impact that the band (composed by the musicians Pablo Ilabaca on the electric guitar, Felipe Ilabaca on the bass, Camilo Salinas on the keyboards and Pedropiedra on the drums, together with the voice actors of the program) scheduled four presentations for July in the Movistar Arena of Santiago. These events were very well attended and popular, in addition to being released on a live album called Gira Mundial —under the label Feria Music—. In the second half of 2012 the Organizing Committee of the 2013 Viña del Mar International Song Festival confirmed 31 minutos as one of the national artists for the journey. They performed on February 27, 2013, being the first puppet group to set foot in the Quinta Vergara. In more than an hour and a half of presentation they achieved a show that was praised by the press and applauded by the audience present, which gave them the 4 maximum awards of the evening. They also achieved the maximum position of tune of the 2013 edition of the festival: 53 points of screen share. Coinciding with the same day of the presentation, the company Amnesia Games developed a game of 31 minutos for cellular phones in alliance with the producer Aplaplac and the telephone company Claro Chile. The game stood out in the stores of Windows Phone and Amazon and managed to position itself in the first places of the App Store.

In view of the success achieved at the festival, they decided to play the stages again, but this time with Radio Guaripolo, a show directed by Alvaro Diaz and written by Pedro Peirano, which officially opened at the Teatro Municipal de Las Condes. In it, Guaripolo owns a radio station, where he plays pranks on the phone to the rest of the characters of 31 minutos. One of the most important events of this production was the premiere of the song "Mi mamá me lo teje todo", which would later be part of the soundtrack of the fourth season.

=== Fourth season and present ===
In addition, after nine years of absence, 31 minutos announced its return to television, according to an interview given by Aplaplac to the Chilean newspaper La Tercera. The fourth season began its recordings in 2013 and was broadcast on TVN. In addition, the program again won a fund from the CNTV to finance it. The team underwent restructuring, such as the change of Juan Manuel Egaña —who became Manager of Management and Development of Chilevisión— to Alejandra Neumann in the executive production of Aplaplac and the series, and the performance of Juanín, who although dubbed by Salinas did not participate as a puppeteer in the recordings, so the actor Héctor Velozo had to take his place. Salinas only brought his characters to life live in the presentation at the 2013 Viña del Mar Festival.

This season's premiere was on October 4, 2014, viewed for the first time in HD (16:9) format. The first episode marked 9.3 points of screen share, but was surpassed by the program Morandé con compañía of the Chilean television channel Mega —which obtained more than 15—. It ended the night of December 27, 2014 after a cycle of twelve episodes. Despite the low results it obtained on Televisión Nacional de Chile, from October 2015 it was bought and transmitted by the Cartoon Network signal to Chile, Peru, Bolivia and Ecuador, and then began to be broadcast to all of Latin America by Boomerang. On January 5, 2020 it was added to Netflix Latin America.

During the premiere of the fourth season's chapters, 31 minutos adapted their 2003 Christmas special to a montage entitled Calurosa Navidad, with which they performed during the month of December at the Centro de las Artes 660 in Las Condes. The program had already established itself as a band, and Díaz and Peirano decided to focus their future on touring and live concerts. During 2015, they prepared a play based on William Shakespeare's Romeo and Juliet, which was presented in January 2016 as part of the Santiago a Mil International Festival. It was then shown at venues such as the Teatro Municipal de Las Condes in April 2016 and the Teatro Oriente de Providencia in July of the same year. It again participated in the 2017 version of the Santiago a Mil International Festival.

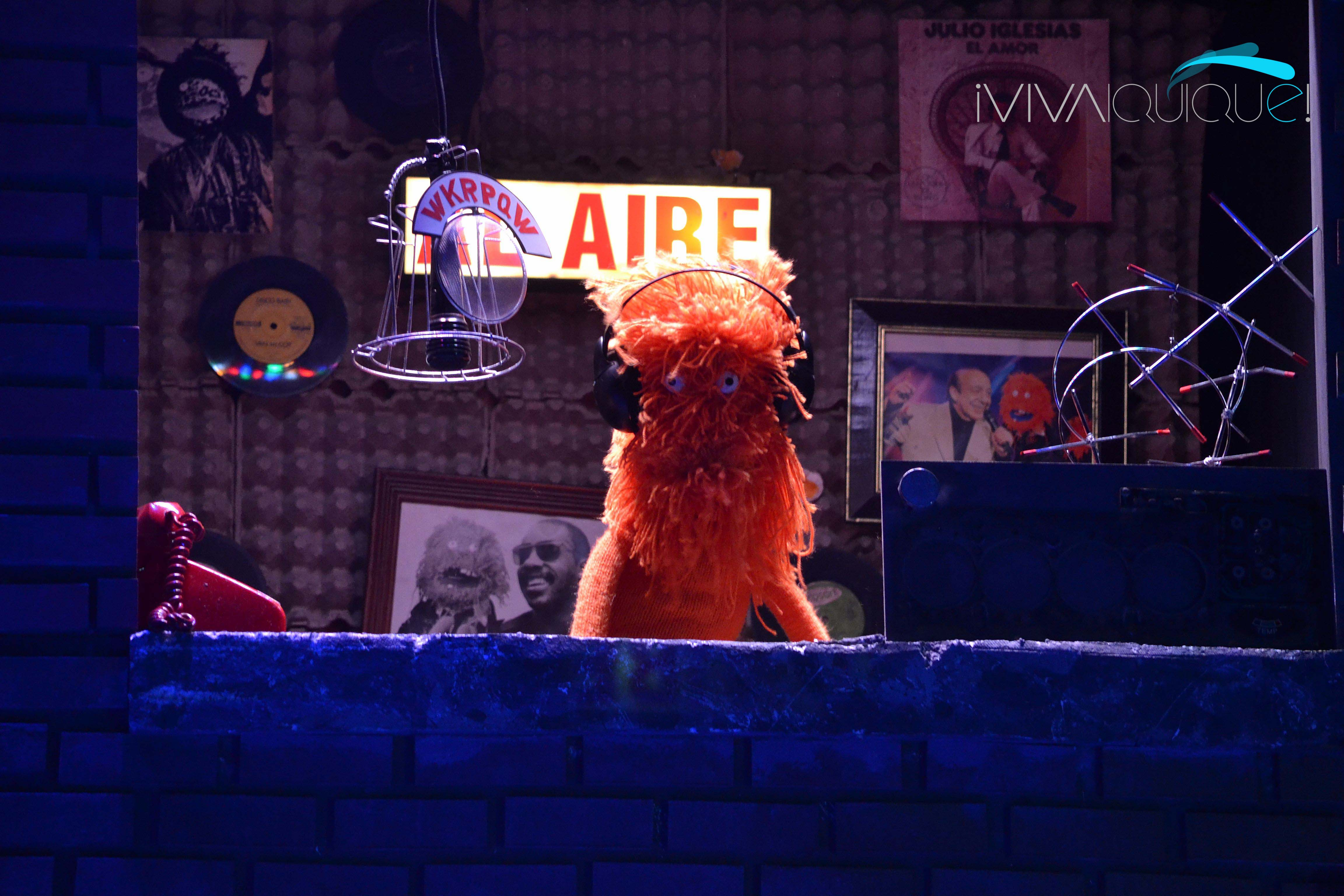
Scene from the Radio Guaripolo tour.

On September 12, 2015, Aplaplac independently released the album Arwrarwrirwrarwro —where the songs of the fourth season are located—. The album had a pre-sale in Mexico, in July of the same year, during a presentation of Radio Guaripolo. Pablo Ilabaca and Álvaro Díaz were in charge of its production, but it had the support of Felipe Ilabaca, Camilo Salinas and Pedropiedra in the instruments.

On the other hand, Radio Guaripolo performed for the last time at the Festival Osorno de la Leche y la Carne, on January 30, 2016. For the tour in Mexico 2016, Aplaplac released Tremendo Tulio Tour, a parody of the tributes of artists for their careers, where they give one to Tulio Triviño. The success of the tour led them to play live for the first time in Argentina and Colombia. The first performance took place at the Usina del Arte in Buenos Aires on April 21, 2018. This was the last show in which Pedropiedra participated as drummer for 31 minutos, so Leonardo Corvalán —drummer for Chancho en Piedra— took his place. The second was at the Festival Rock al Paque in Bogotá on June 30, 2019, with three performances on the same day.

In January 2019, a fifth studio album was confirmed, without relying on the music of a season. To promote it, the first single was "Ritmo sideral", released on October 11, 2019. It was followed by "Perro chico" and "Lucía, la sandía", which appeared on November 22, 2019 and January 17, 2020, respectively. On November 20, 2019, the organizers of the Mexican festival Vive Latino released the line-up for its 21st edition, where it highlighted 31 minutos with a double performance, on March 14 and 15, 2020 with a special show. They named the show Yo nunca vi televisión —like the homonymous song on the first album of 31 minutos—, and in it they recreated the format of a newscast —like in the TV series— and played a repertoire of songs of which "Ritmo sideral" and "Perro chico" were part. During February 2020 a tour in Mexico was scheduled in which Yo nunca vi televisión was to perform during March in the cities of San Luis Potosí, Guadalajara and Mérida, but to prevent contagion from the COVID-19 pandemic it was decided to reschedule the dates for October of the following year. Of the original presentations, 31 minutos could only be presented on both days at the Vive Latino festival. The crisis caused by this disease was the reason for 31 minutos to join for the third time with UNICEF to launch the "Cuarentena 31" campaign, with the aim of addressing issues that affect children during confinement. The capsules were broadcast on Cartoon Network and Boomerang Latinoamécica, and on July 29, 2020, a song entitled "Primavera" was launched to encourage people in the midst of the health crisis. On September 1, 2020, UNICEF named 31 minutos as Goodwill Ambassadors for UNICEF Chile.

Díaz and Peirano have stated on multiple occasions that it is not possible to make a fifth season for Chilean television, because this is not a format where the program can remain —adding to this the high costs of production—. The reinvention through tours, new songs and records has been key to the validity of the franchise. In any case, none of them have ruled out the possibility of making it on streaming platforms, according to the interest of these.

== Characters ==
31 minutos is anchored by Tulio Triviño Tufillo, a millionaire who is self-centered and ignorant, with a short attention span. He is the best friend of Juan Carlos Bodoque, a red rabbit. He is the program's star journalist and is in charge of the environmental section La Nota Verde. He is moody, bohemian, witty, an occasional poet, a womanizer, but above all, he is addicted to horse racing and betting at the racetrack.

Juanín Juan Harry is the studio's general producer and, remarkably, the last surviving member of his species, the Juanines. He loves his work, and everyone knows he is the one who actually does everything.

Policarpo Avendaño is the entertainment commentator and host of the music segment Ranking Top. Mario Hugo is an absent-minded reporter and owner of many dogs. He is in love with Patana Tufillo, a young intern journalist who is also Tulio's niece.

This team is rounded out by Calcetín con Rombos Man, the superhero defender of children's rights, and Guaripolo, who calls himself the "favorite character of kids who watch 31 minutos."

== Dub ==
Despite being mostly broadcast in Latin American countries in their original language, 31 minutos has been dubbed for broadcast in other countries. The first two seasons of the program were dubbed into Portuguese by Nickelodeon under the studio Álamo for broadcast in Brazil during 2004 and 2007, and later season four in the studio Unidub (with the same actors) for Netflix Brazil. A pilot dubbed into Spanish from Europe was shown to Spanish channels in 2004, however, it was not until 2008 that the series was broadcast in Spain through the VeoTV channel, with its original dub. A fragment of episode fifteen of the second season (Hielito) was also shown in Netherlands as a segment within another show, and its dubbing was done by the comedian Niels van der Laan, who played all the characters.

Original name	Chile (Original voice acting)	Brazil	Netherlands	Ref.
Tulio Triviño	Pedro Peirano	Luiz Laffey	Niels van der Laan	
Juan Carlos Bodoque	Álvaro Díaz	Marcelo Pissardini	Niels van der Laan	
Juanín Juan Harry	Rodrigo Salinas	Tatá Guarnieri	Niels van der Laan	
Mario Hugo	Rodrigo Salinas	Tatá Guarnieri	Niels van der Laan	
Policarpo Avendaño	Daniel Castro	Alfredo Rollo	Niels van der Laan	
Patana Tufillo	Jani Dueñas	Cecília Lemes	-	
Mico el Micófono	Daniel Castro	Tatá Guarnieri	-	
Calcetín con Rombos Man	Daniel Castro	Alfredo Rollo	-	
Huachimingo	Daniel Castro	Wendel Bezerra	-	
Guaripolo	Patricio Díaz	Marcelo Pissardini	-	

== Films ==
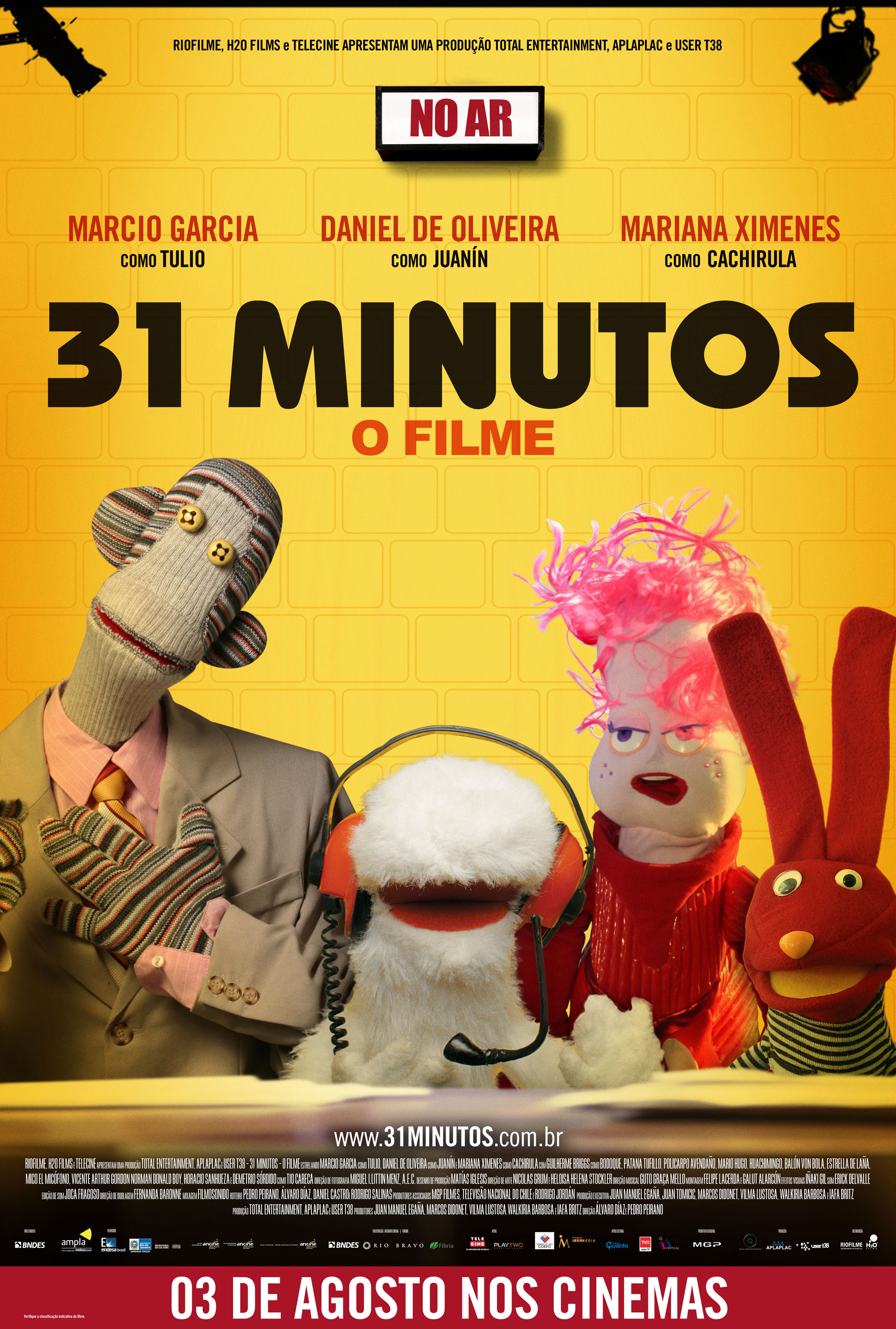
Poster for the promotion of the film in Brazil. From left to right: Tulio Triviño, Juanín Juan Harry, Cachirula de los Cachirulos and Juan Carlos Bodoque.

Since the success of their first season, Diaz and Peirano had a much larger project in mind, a film of 31 minutos. This began to be developed after the completion of the third season's production. The incidental music was provided by Pablo Ilabaca and Angelo Pierattini —who had already worked together on the album of the third season Ratoncitos—. The recordings began in Chile in October 2006 and ended in the summer of 2007 in Rio de Janeiro, Brazil —where the production company Total Entertainment joined in to provide the cinematic experience that Aplaplac did not have—. However, the post-production and sound process delayed the film, with things like a telephone casting to choose the voices of Tulio, Bodoque, and Juanín in their childhood. In September 2007, Peirano went to review the co-production in Spain. Because he was not carrying cash, he was not allowed into the country, which he was able to enter only after the intervention of the Chilean embassy.

Finally the series was brought to the big screen under the name of 31 minutos, la película, and was released in Chile on March 27, 2008, in Mexico on October 16, 2009 and in Brazil on August 3, 2012. With this film the series was given a temporary end. In total, 210,000 spectators attended to see the film in Chile. Despite being praised, it did not collect what it cost to produce it, which led Aplaplac into an economic crisis for two years, and its members had to work on other projects. In addition, they were affected by a robbery at the production company's offices.

A new film entitled 31 minutos: Calurosa Navidad was developed for Prime Video, and released in November 21, 2025.

== Spin-offs ==
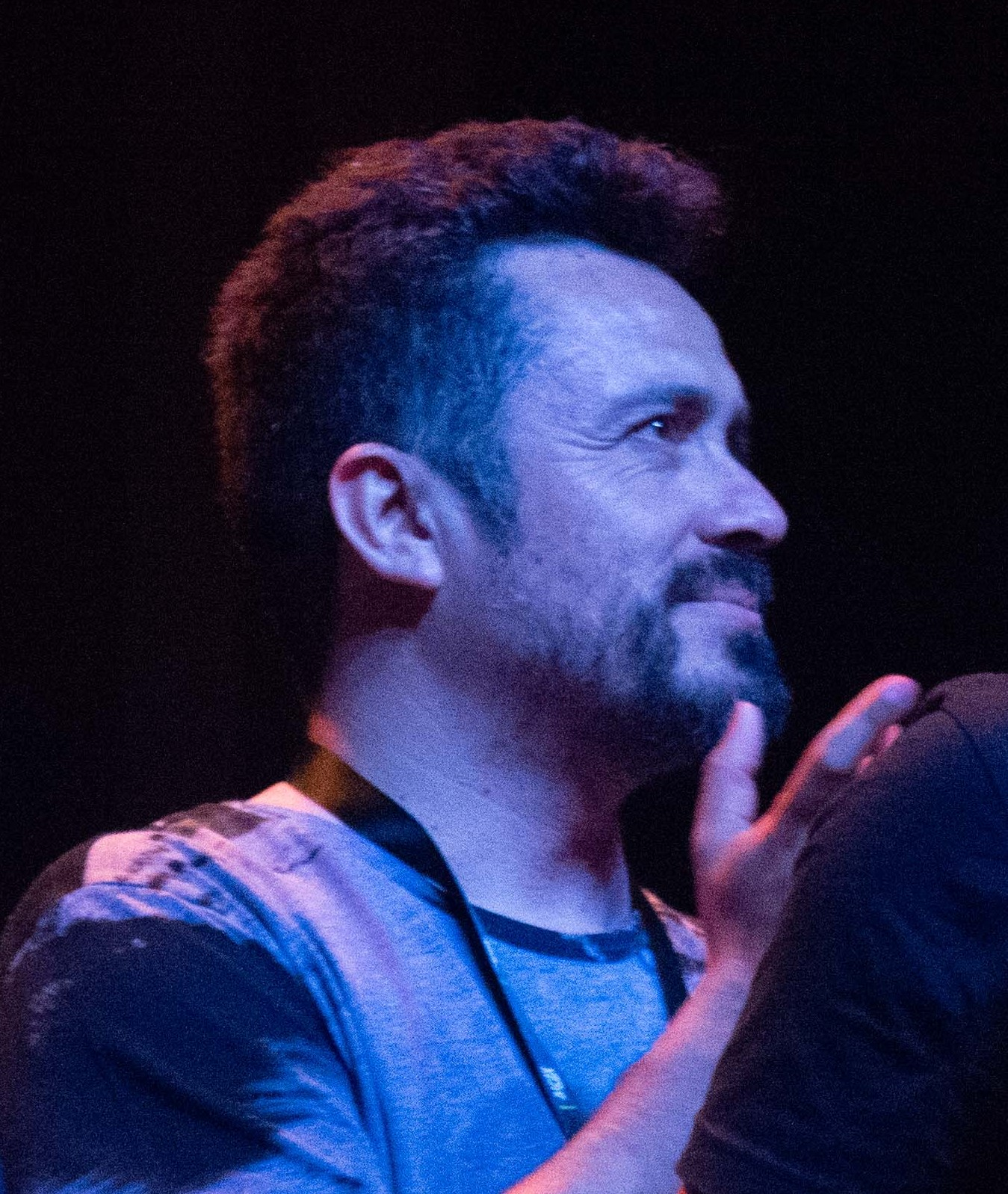
Pablo Ilabaca is one of the composers of the songs of 31 minutos, along with the writers and actors of the series

Aplaplac has produced several mini-series with the characters of 31 minutos. As a project for the National Museum of Dentistry of the University of Chile, the production company made a four-episode web series called Las muelas de Guaripolo, in which this character appears teaching the public information about dental hygiene and its history. Together with Las muelas de Guaripolo, in 2017, 31 minutos in collaboration with the Ministry of Health of Chile made the web series La nube de humo. This mini-series consists of three chapters of four to five minutes and deals with how Juan Carlos Bodoque —already retired from journalism— decides to fall into Ramona's requests to do a report on air pollution in Chile.

On July 11, 2009, Las vacaciones de Tulio, Patana y el pequeño Tim premiered on TVN. The program —which consists of 12 episodes— is designed as a spin-off of 31 minutos, that is, a production derived from some of its characters; and the one chosen was precisely Tulio Triviño, the self-centered news anchor who now moves to his lavish summer cabin with his niece Patana and Tim, a friend of hers. The stay is boring, so Tulio entertains his little companions by telling them stories, and so each chapter begins. It is worth mentioning that Juan Carlos Bodoque is also present in Tulio's stories giving ecological advice.

== Discography ==
- 31 minutos (2003)
- 31 canciones de amor y una canción de Guaripolo (2004)
- Ratoncitos (2005)
- Gira mundial (en vivo) (2012)
- Arwrarwrirwrarwro (2015)

== Notable live shows ==
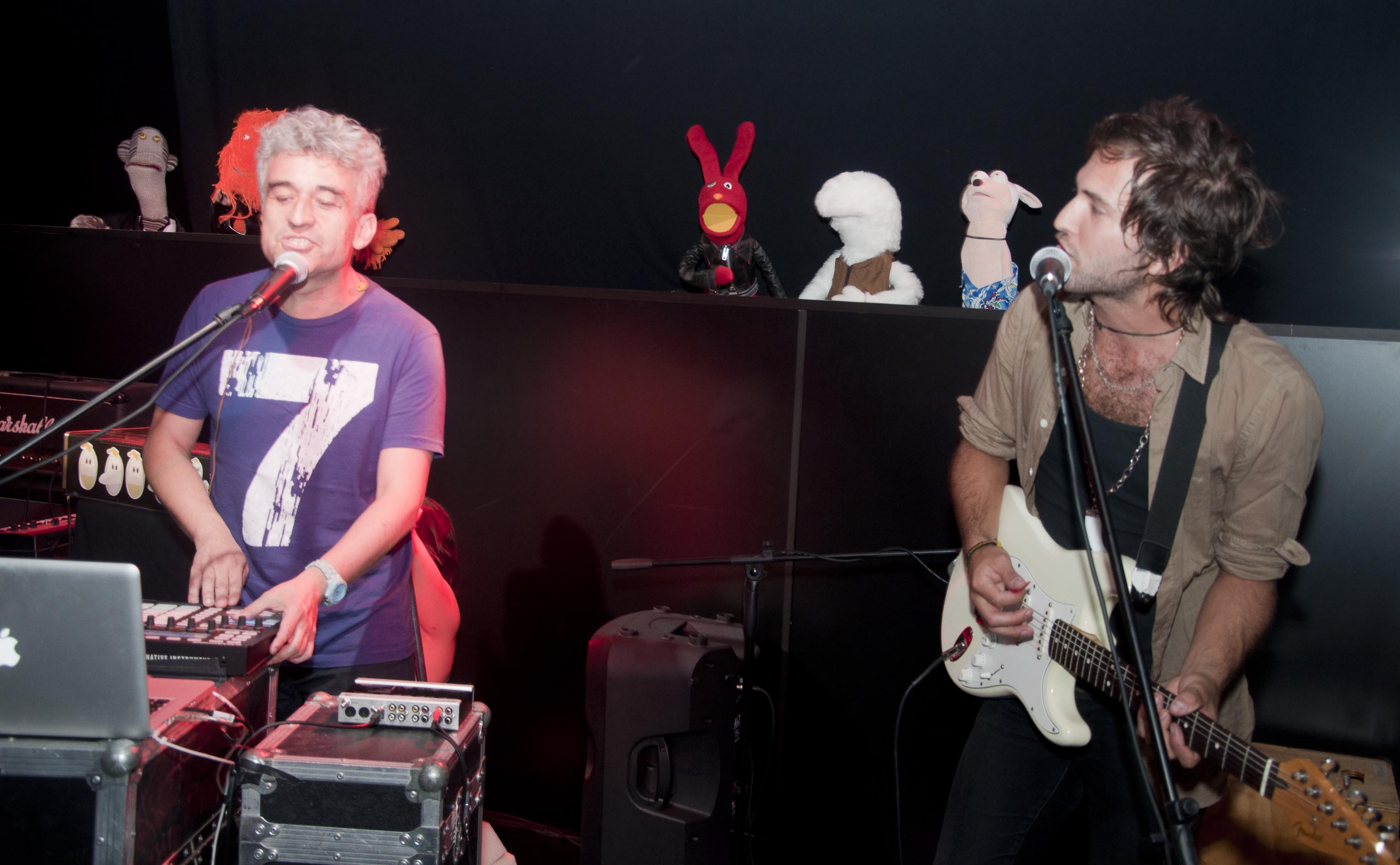
Chilean musician Jorge Gonzalez playing with 31 minutos at the opening of a Puma clothing store in Santiago.

- Resucitando una estrella (Resurrecting A Star).
- Tuliopalooza.
- Gira mundial (World Tour).
- Festival de Triviña (performance at the 2013 Festival de la canción de Viña del Mar).
- Radio Guaripolo.
- Calurosa Navidad (Hot Christmas).
- Romeo y Julieta (Romeo and Juliet).
- Tremendo Tulio Tour (Awesome Tulio Tour).
- Yo nunca vi televisión (I Never Watched Television).
- Don Quijote (Don Quixote).
- Tiny Desk Concerts.

== Awards, nominations and distinctions ==
2003

- Spanish American Prix Jeunesse Award, in the category Best Childhood TV Show for 6 - 11 years non-fiction, and TV Show chosen by children.
- TV-Grama Award in the category Best Childhood TV Show.
- Chile's Circle of Reviewer Award, in the category Television.

2004

- Award given by the School of Communication Studies, Film and TV from UNIACC University to 31 minutos by Creative Contribution to Chilean TV.
- Only nominee and winner category Contribution to the TV in Apes awards.
- Winner of Altazor award in the categories Rock popular music, Graphic design and illustration, TV Show Direction and Script.
- The organization Actitud Animal and the Chilean Federation of Animal Protection Institutions given an award to Juan Carlos Bodoque by to teach how care and guard different species.
- 4th place in the category Light Entertainment of Prix Jeunesse Internacional.
- Was nominated to Inte Awards in the category Infantil TV Show of the Year.
- Nominated to International Emmy Award in the category Children & Young People.

2009

- Choral Award in the Animation category of the Havana Film Festival for 31 minutos, la película.

2013

- Antorcha de Plata, Antorcha de Oro, Gaviota de Plata and Gaviota de Oro in the LIV Viña del Mar International Song Festival.

2016

- At the 2016 Pulsar Awards the program was nominated in three categories for its album Arwrarwrirwrarwro, for Best Children Artist, Artist of the Year and Album of the Year.

2018

- Winner of the Indigo Awards 2018, in the Best Live Show category.

2019

- The website Rave recognized 31 minutos as the Best Chilean production in the history, based on IMDb statistics —with a rating of 8.4—.

== See also ==
- Spitting Image - A British satirical puppet show.
- Plan Z (TV Show) - Earlier TV show created by many of the same participants.
