= Rodrigo Salinas =

Rodrigo Salinas may refer to:

- Rodrigo Salinas (footballer, born 1986), Argentine forward
- Rodrigo Salinas (footballer, born 1988), Mexican right back
- Rodrigo Salinas Muñoz, Chilean handballer
- Rodrigo Salinas (comedian), Chilean cartoonist
