= Rafael Gumucio =

Chilean writer and comedian (born 1970)

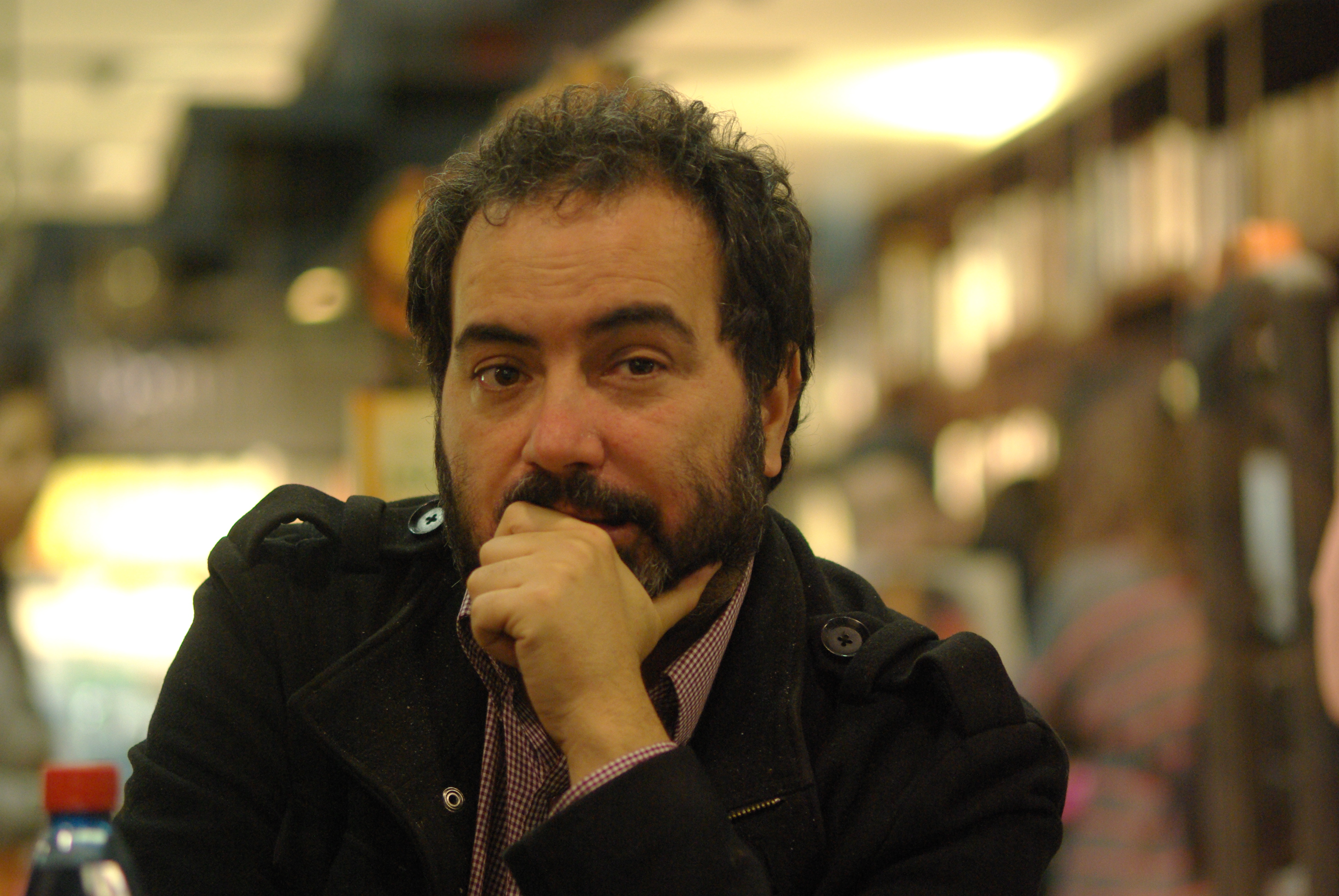
Gumucio in April 2015

Rafael Gumucio Araya (born January 15, 1970, in Santiago) is a Chilean writer and comedian.

== Biography ==
He is son of the historian Rafael Luis Gumucio Rivas, grandson of the left-wing politician Rafael Agustín Gumucio, and the cousin of filmmaker and also politician Marco Enríquez-Ominami. He attended high school at the Colegio Regina Pacis in Ñuñoa;, graduated as a Spanish language teacher first and then as a Master in Literature at the Universidad de Chile.

After the 1973 Chilean coup d'état he lived as an exile in France.

He published his first novel in 1999, Memorias prematuras (Premature memoirs), called "a book where the writer narrates his life; the exile with his family in France, his return to Chile, his failure with women, his first dabblings in journalism and university life" and "for many, the best he has ever written".

He resided nearly four years in Spain and in 2004 he published his second novel, los platos rotos (The broken dishes), on which Gumucio has stated "it is very fictional non-fiction. It is an historical essay that has something of short story, theatre, novel, narrative".

Afterwards he got married and moved to New York City. There, in the hometown of his wife, with whom he has two daughters, he wrote La deuda (The debt).

He has written for the newspapers La Nación, El Mercurio, La Tercera, El Metropolitano, Las Últimas Noticias, El País, ABC and New York Times and for the magazines Apsi, Rock & Pop, Fibra, of which he was founder and general editor and The Clinic, of which he was also one of its founders.

He has also been conductor, script-writer and producer of television shows like Gato por liebre (Rock & Pop Televisión, 1995–1998) and of the absurdist humour show Plan Z (TV show), which was censored more than once.

He is director of the Instituto de Estudios Humorísticos of the Universidad Diego Portales and comedian-host of the Desde Zero show on Radio Zero with Patricio Fernández and Claudia Álamo.

== Prizes ==
- Anna Seghers-Preis 2004 (Alemania)
- Runner-up of the Premio Altazor 2000 with Memorias Prematuras
- Runner-up of the Premio Altazor 2003 for essays with Monstruos cardinales

== Works ==
- Invierno en la torre, tale, 1995
- Memorias prematuras, novel, 1999
- Monstruos cardinales, column compilation, 2002
- Comedia nupcial, novel, 2002
- Los platos rotos. Historia personal de Chile, 2004
- Páginas coloniales, travel book, 2006
- La deuda, novel, 2009
- Contra la belleza, essay, 2010
- La situación, literary chronicle, 2011
