= Life Kills Me =

- Theatrical release poster
- Directed by: Sebastián Silva
- Written by: Sebastián Silva; Pedro Peirano
- Produced by: Juan de Dios Larraín; Pablo Larraín
- Starring: Diego Muñoz; Amparo Noguera; Gabriel Díaz
- Cinematography: Sergio Armstrong
- Edited by: Danielle Fillios
- Music by: Andrés Subercaseaux; Jorge del Campo; Pedro Subercaseaux
- Production company: Fábula
- Release dates: August 17, 2007 (SANFIC); November 1, 2017 (Chile)
- Running time: 89 minutes
- Country: Chile
- Language: Spanish

Life Kills Me (Spanish: La vida me mata) is a 2007 Chilean comedy-drama film directed by Sebastián Silva (in his directorial debut) and written by Silva & Pedro Peirano. Starring Diego Muñoz, Amparo Noguera and Gabriel Díaz.

== Synopsis ==
Gaspar, a depressed young man, has not been able to overcome the early death of his brother, until he feels that he has reincarnated as Álvaro, a young man he has just met. Álvaro, an eccentric obsessed with death, takes advantage of the influence he has acquired in Gaspar to guide him through a series of experiences related to death. In this dangerous game, Gaspar will find a reason to live and Álvaro will find death.

== Cast ==
The actors participating in this film are:

- Gabriel Díaz as Gaspar
- Diego Muñoz as Álvaro
- Claudia Celedón as Susana
- Amparo Noguera as Margarita
- Catalina Saavedra as Chabela
- Ramón Llao as Rubén / Ghost 2
- Alejandro Sieveking as David
- Marcial Tagle as Javier
- Roberto Farías as Coach
- Luz Valdivieso as Andrea
- Bélgica Castro as The Old Woman (The Death)
- Isidora Quer as Sofía
- Maricarmen Arrigorriaga as María Paz
- María Eugenia Barrenechea as Mother
- Sebastián Silva as Ghost 1
- Pedropiedra as Ghost 3
- Pablo Schwarz as Dead

== Production ==
Principal photography began in July 2006 in Chile.

== Release ==
Life Kills Me had its world premiere on August 17, 2007, at the 3rd Santiago International Film Festival. It was commercially released on November 1, 2017, in Chilean theaters.

== Accolades ==
Year	Award / Festival	Category	Recipient	Result	Ref.
2007	Santiago International Film Festival	Special Mention	Amparo Noguera	Won	
2007	Santiago International Film Festival	Latin American Competition - Audience Award	Life Kills Me	Won	
2008	Pedro Sienna Awards	Best Picture	Life Kills Me	Won	
2008	Pedro Sienna Awards	Best Director	Sebastián Silva	Nominated	
2008	Pedro Sienna Awards	Best Actor	Diego Muñoz	Nominated	
2008	Pedro Sienna Awards	Best Supporting Performance	Claudia Celedón	Won	
2008	Pedro Sienna Awards	Best Screenplay	Sebastián Silva & Pedro Peirano	Nominated	
2008	Pedro Sienna Awards	Best Cinematography	Sergio Armstrong	Nominated	
2008	Pedro Sienna Awards	Best Editing	Danielle Fillios	Won	
2008	Pedro Sienna Awards	Best Art Direction	Polín Garbisu	Nominated	
2008	Pedro Sienna Awards	Best Costume Design	Antonia Bravo	Nominated	
2008	Pedro Sienna Awards	Best Makeup	Carolina Lizana	Won	
2008	Pedro Sienna Awards	Best Special Effects	Mario Villalobos & Ismael Cabrera	Won	
2008	Altazor Awards	Best Fiction Film Direction	Sebastián Silva	Won	
2008	Altazor Awards	Best Actor in Film	Alejandro Sieveking	Won	
2008	Altazor Awards	Best Actress in Film	Bélgica Castro	Won	
2008	Altazor Awards	Best Actress in Film	Claudia Celedón	Nominated	
2008	Circle of Art Critics of Chile	Best Chilean Film	Life Kills Me	Won	
