= Pedro Peirano =

Chilean director, writer, cartoonist and producer

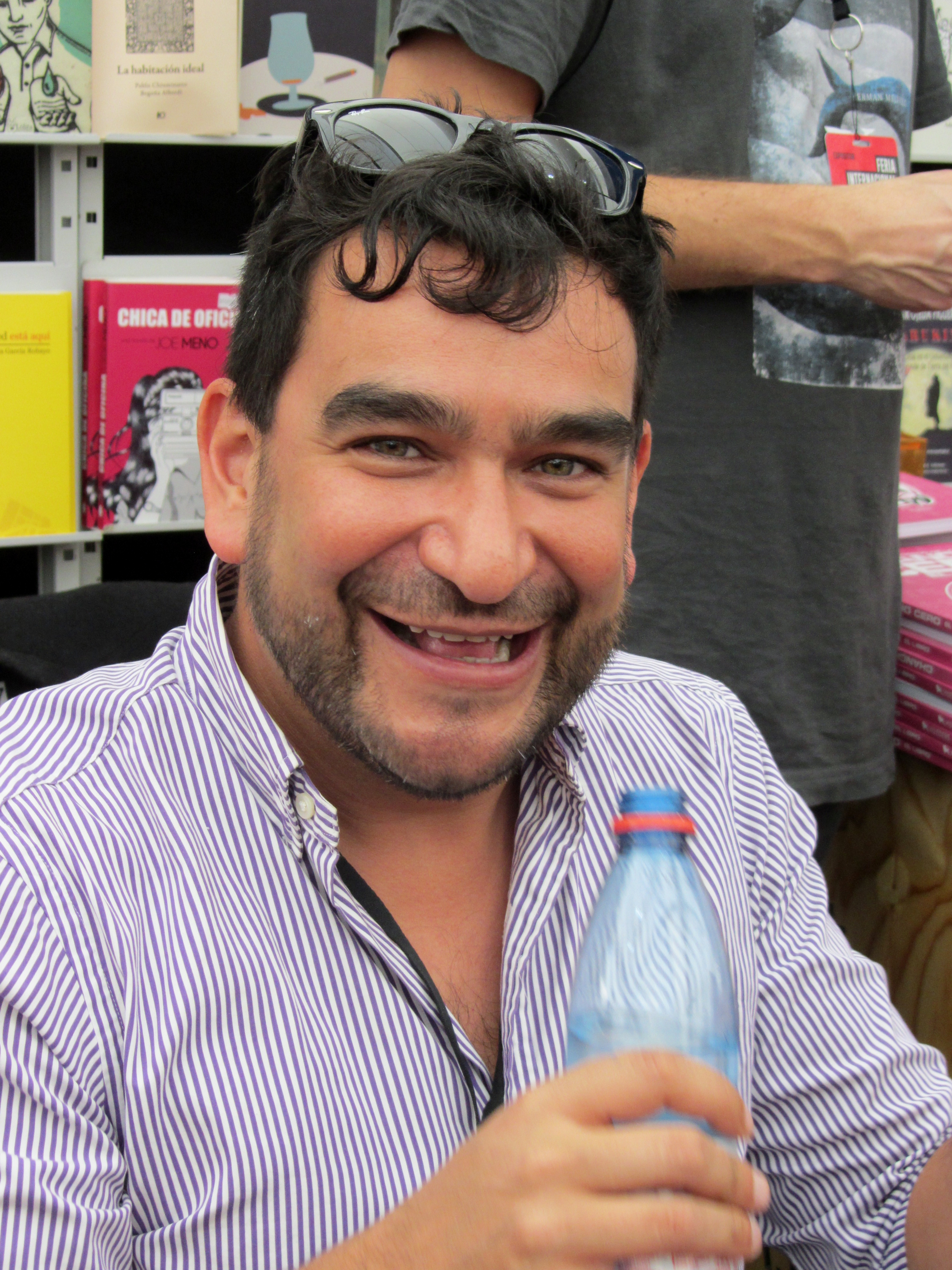
- Peirano in 2015
- Born: Pedro Pablo Peirano Olate; December 25, 1972 (age 53); Santiago, Chile
- Occupations: Director, screenwriter, artist and actor
- Years active: 1996 - present
- Awards: World Cinema Screenwriting Award 2012 at Sundance Film Festival for Joven y alocada (co-wrote).; Altazor Awards Best TV Director 2004 for 31 Minutos (co-directed).; Altazor Awards Best TV screenplay 2004 for 31 Minutos (co-wrote).; Altazor Awards Best TV Director 2000, for El factor humano (co-director).

Pedro Pablo Peirano Olate (born December 25, 1972) is a Chilean director, screenwriter, journalist, cartoonist and television producer. He wrote the film No (script developed from a theatrical monologue written by Antonio Skármeta), which was nominated for an Academy Award for Best Foreign Film in January 2013.

== Biography ==
Peirano was born on December 25 and as a result, as a child, he claims to have believed he had the same powers as Jesus. He studied at Los Sagrados Corazones school in Santiago, where he edited the student publication El Vikingo (The Viking) from 1989 to 1990. He then studied journalism at the University of Chile where he met Álvaro Díaz, who would later become his partner in creating the TV production company Aplaplac.

Among Peirano's earliest professional works were the TV series Plan Z (1997), which he co-wrote, and El Factor Humano (The Human Factor, 1998), which he co-directed with former classmate Álvaro Díaz. Both shows were social satires exploring absurd humour and political incorrectness, though Plan Z used a comedy sketch show format while El Factor Humano took the form of a journalistic documentary series. El Factor Humano won an Altazor national art prize in 2000.

In 2000, Peirano published the first editions of the popular and enduring comic strip “Chancho Cero” (Zero Pig), which appeared in the children's magazine of the prestigious Chilean national newspaper El Mercurio. In 2002, Peirano published a compilation book of the strip, which was later re-edited and re-released in 2006.

Peirano teamed up with Álvaro Díaz again in 2002 to create the TV production company Aplaplac. One of their first projects was the successful satirical puppet show 31 Minutos (31 Minutes), launched in 2003 on Chile's national TV channel TVN. The show was so popular that it was turned into a movie, 31 minutos, la película, in 2008 and won Altazor awards for both directing and writing in 2004.

Pedro has achieved international recognition as the co-writer of the successful films The Maid (2009), with Sebastián Silva, and No (2012). Peirano resumed his successful partnership with The Maid's Sebastián Silva in 2011 to co-write and co-direct Gatos Viejos (Old Cats). No, which dealt with the Chilean national plebiscite of 1988, has been nominated for Best Foreign Film in the 85th Academy Awards. Peirano also co-wrote the film Joven y Alocada (Young and Wild, 2012) which won the World Cinema Screenwriting Award at the 2012 Sundance Film Festival.

In 2012, Peirano released the graphic novel El Club de los Juguetes Perdidos (The Lost Toys Club).

== Filmography ==
=== Director ===
==== Cinema ====
- Gatos viejos (Old Cats, 2010); codirector with Sebastián Silva.
- 31 minutos, la película (31 Minutes, The Movie) (2008); codirector with Álvaro Díaz.

==== TV ====
- Las vacaciones de Tulio y el pequeño Tim (2009). Children's series. Codirector with Álvaro Díaz.
- Sangre, sudor y lágrimas (2004). Documentary mini series. Codirector with Álvaro Díaz.
- Los dibujos de Bruno Kulczewski (2004). Children's series. Codirector with Álvaro Díaz.
- 31 minutos (2003). Children's series. Codirector with Álvaro Díaz.
- Mira tú (2002). Mini series. Codirector with Álvaro Díaz.
- Nunca digas nunca jamás (1998). Documentary mini series. Codirector with Álvaro Díaz.
- El factor humano (1998). Comedy documentary series. Codirector with Álvaro Díaz.

=== Screenwriter ===
==== Cinema ====
- No (2012)
- Joven y alocada (2012); co-writer.
- Gatos viejos (2010), co-writer.
- The Maid (2009), co-writer.
- 31 minutos, la película (2008); co-writer.
- Life Kills Me (2007); co-writer.
- Los dibujos de Bruno Kulczewski (2004); co-writer.

==== TV ====
- Las vacaciones de Tulio y el pequeño Tim (2009); co-writer.
- Niño santo (2011); series.
- 31 Minutos (2003); co-writer.
- Mira tú (2002); co-writer.
- Plan Z(TV show) (1997); co-writer.

=== Actor ===
==== Cine ====
- 31 minutos, la película (2008); puppeteer and voice of the characters (Tulio Triviño, Raúl Guantecillo, Bongo Stingo)

==== TV ====
- 31 Minutos (2003); Tulio Triviño and other characters.
- Plan Z (1997); several characters.

== Cartoonist ==
Peirano, as a cartoonist and writer, is the author of the following comics:

- Las aventuras de Toñito Talón (1998); published in the supplement “Club del Ingenio” from Chilean newspaper ‘’Las Últimas Noticias’’
- El computador loco (2004); published in the supplement “Timón” from newspaper El Mercurio
- Chancho Cero (2000) published in the supplement Zona de Contacto from El Mercurio; and in a compilation book in 2002 and 2006.
- Las excelentes aventuras de Timón el legendario (2004); published in the supplement “Timón” from El Mercurio.
- El club de los juguetes perdidos (2012).

== Awards ==
- World Cinema Screenwriting Award 2012, Sundance Festival, for Joven y alocada (co-writer).
- Altazor Awards Best TV Director 2004, for 31 Minutos (co-writer).
- Altazor Awards Best TV screenplay 2004, for 31 Minutos (co-writer).
- Altazor Awards Best TV Director 2000, for El factor humano (co-director).
