= Pedropiedra =

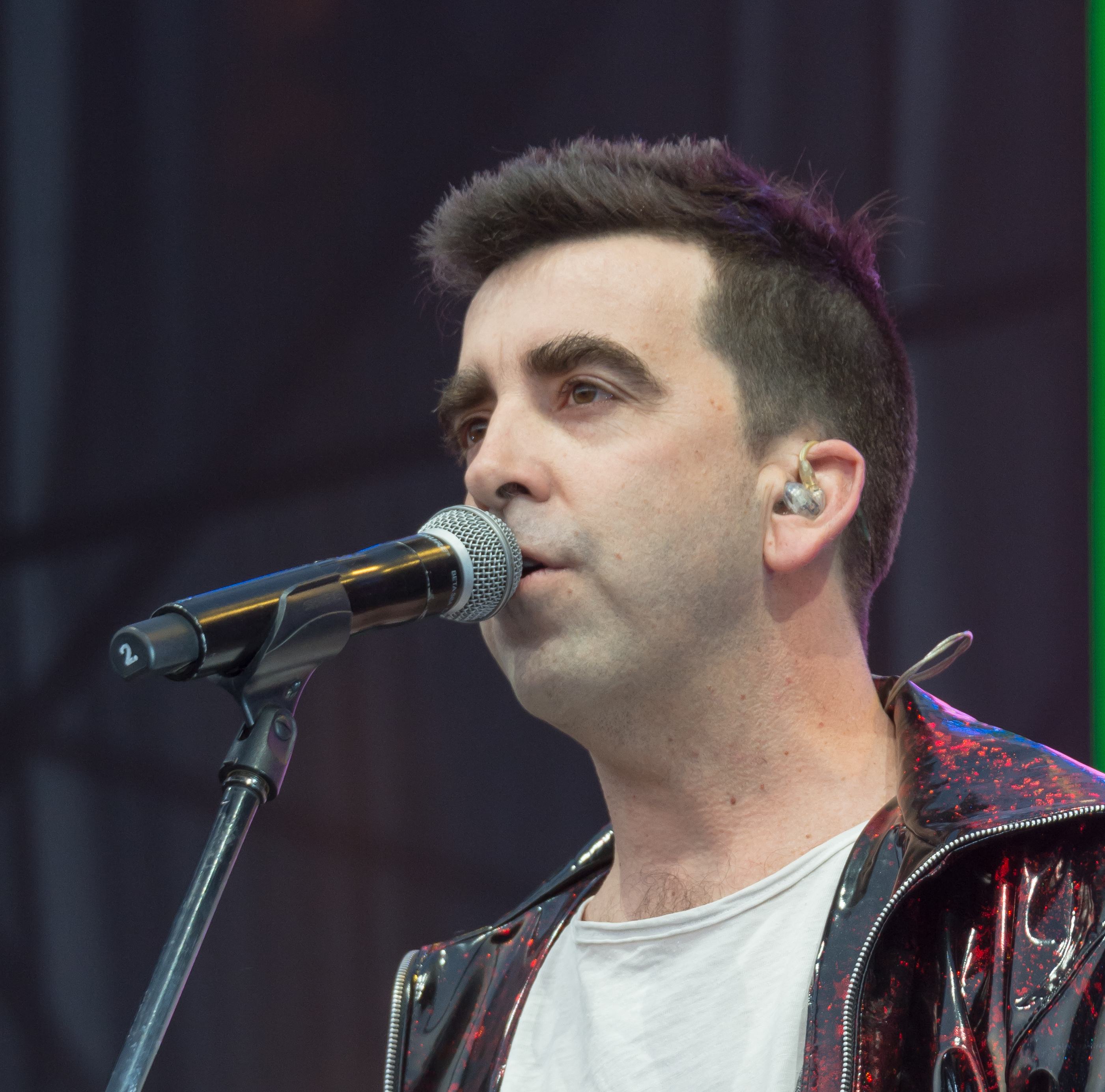
- Pedropiedra performing live in 2019.
- Born: Pedro Subercaseaux García de la Huerta; 17 April 1978 (age 47); Santiago, Chile
- Occupations: Singer-songwriter, multi-instrumentalist
- Musical career
- Origin: Santiago, Chile
- Genres: Rock, Pop, Hip hop, Indie, alternative rock, Pop rock, Synth pop, Pop latino
- Years active: 1998–present
- Label: Quemasucabeza

Pedro Subercaseaux García de la Huerta (Santiago, April 17, 1978), better known by his stage name Pedropiedra, is a Chilean musician and composer. In addition to his solo career including five studio albums, he has also served as drummer for Jorge González' and 31 minutos' bands, as well as being member of several other bands such as CHC (2001-2009) and the superband Pillanes since 2018 as a multi-instrumentalist.

== Biography and career ==
=== Childhood and adolescence ===
He is son of the painter Juan Subercaseaux Sommerhoff and Paula García de la Huerta Echaurren. During his childhood in the commune of San Bernardo in the southern sector of Santiago de Chile, Subercaseaux began self-taught on the guitar and drums. He has pointed out that his first influences were the group The Beatles, a taste that he inherited from his mother, Michael Jackson, Los Prisioneros and Soda Stereo, in addition to romantic music in Spanish.

=== Beginnings in several bands ===
During his adolescence he forged friendship and collaboration ties with musicians who would later be part of his professional bands, such as Vicente Sanfuentes with whom he founded Los Hermanos Brothers in 2001 and Jorge del Campo and Federico Dannemann, with whom he formed Wanted and who today are part of his backing band.

The band Tropiflaite was formed during their professional music studies at the Escuela Moderna de Música together with Jorge del Campo, Roberto Chicho Espinoza, Diego Las Heras, and Andrés Pérez. This band was dedicated to playing music for weddings, including cumbias and songs by El Puma Rodríguez and Raffaella Carrá. The band lasted only 2 years and they recorded an album called Grandes Éxitos, produced by Juan Carlos Tato Gómez, a former member of Clan 91 and Embrujo. Discouraged and uncomfortable with the poor result of this production, the band disbanded in 2004.

In 2002, Pedro together with Vicente Sanfuentes formed an electronic and rhyming duo called Hermanos Brothers. Driven in part by the success of the 2002 Santiago single and video, they won the MTV award for Best Independent Artist in 2003. The video was directed by Pablo León. This same year Pedro works at CHC (Congregation of Contemplative Brothers), simultaneously. The band is made up of Gabriel Díaz, Sebastián Silva and for the third album called La cosa, Andrea Ducci and the former Tropiflaite Jorge del Campo and Roberto Espinoza would join.

Other groups in which he participates, in parallel to CHC, was Yaia (a group made up of Sebastian Silva and Nea Ducci, members of his previous band, and Lady Clarita, his sister). They only recorded an album in 2005 called Good Morning, produced by Pedro for Mutante Records. The music they played was mainly Afro-Caribbean genres, more focused on dub and reggae. In Yaia, he participates as the lead voice, guitarist and programmer. In this group his stage name was Pita.

He also worked on the soundtrack for the films by former CHC member Sebastián Silva, Life Kills Me (2007), La Nana (2009) and Crystal Fairy (2013). He made the music for the preschool program based on 31 minutos, Tulio, Patana and little Tim's vacation, in addition to participating in the album Yo nunca ví televisión, an album tribute to the mentioned Chilean children's series, where he makes a version of the song "Mr. Glove". Other collaborations are on the Surtek Collective album The Birth of Action, where he raps under the pseudonym Peter Rap, with Mr. Coconut (Uwe Schmidt) for a compilation called Coconut FM where he produced and composed songs. He sang the song "Sin Gravedad" for a Pol Infante project called Spatial Effects in 2008 and played bass and chorus for Hungría in 2006 with Gepe.

=== Solo career ===
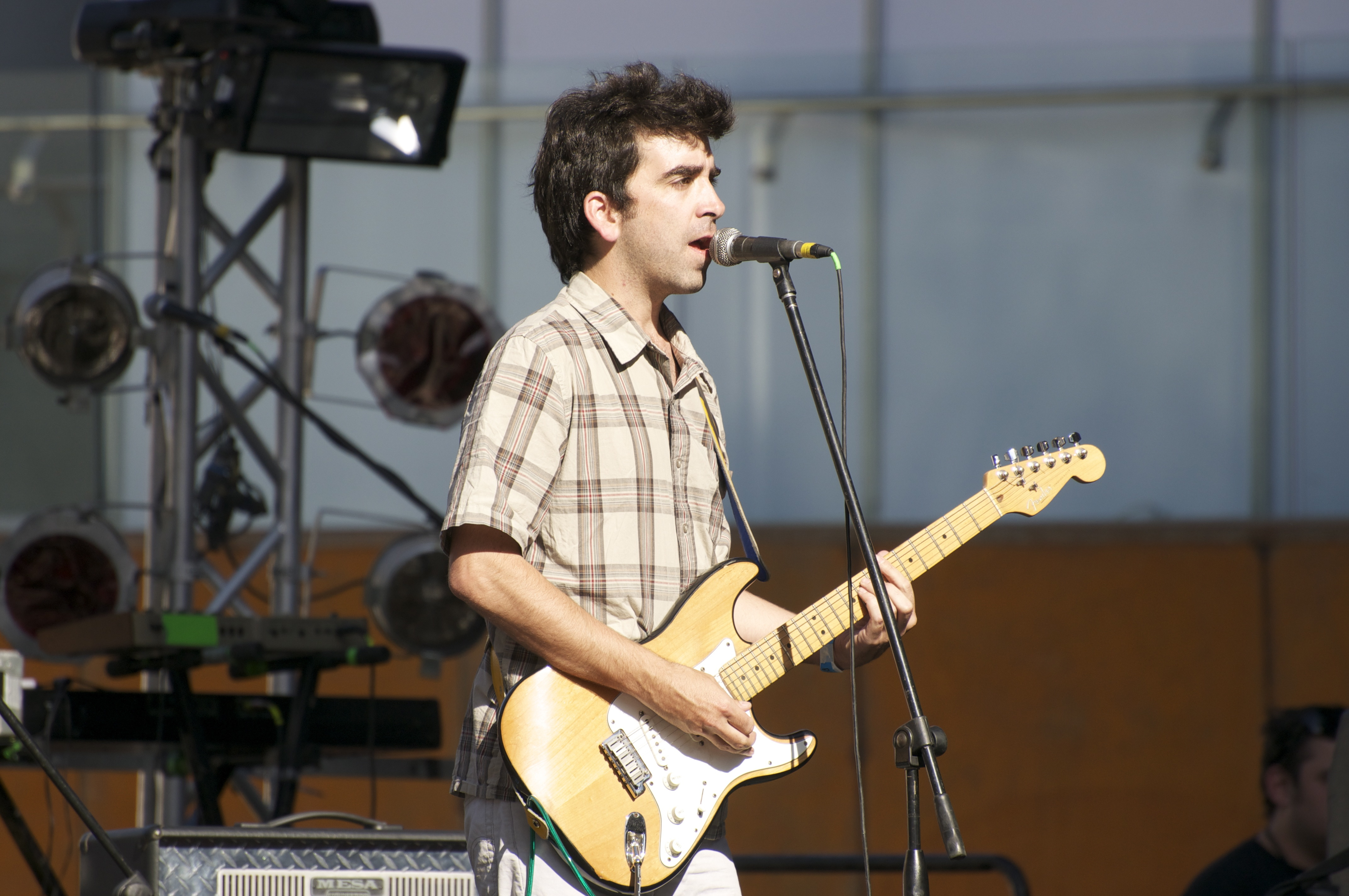
Pedropiedra in 2010

A trip to Mexico determined the metamorphosis that transformed and brought together all the previous musical personalities in a single project. It is in this country where Pedro finally adopted the name Pedropiedra as a soloist. Having traveled to promote the album La cosa de CHC at the end of 2007, and with the failure of this mission, he decided to stay to try his luck in the Aztec capital and began to circulate his demos in the recording environment of said city. Pedro recorded some demos in his spare time and his songs came to Sony Publishing, and they proposed to the singer the deal to record an album with seventeen songs. The negotiation failed due to the appearance of Arturo Turra Medina, Chilean producer and drummer of the Mexican band Sin Bandera. Turra offered Pedro the opportunity to make a record in his studio. Pedro Subercaseaux rejected Sony Publishing's offer to take over Arturo Turra Medina's offer. This offer is where the collaboration with Leonel García arises. His first album entitled Pedropiedra debuted in March 2009 under the Oveja Negra label. The first single called Inteligencia dormida (Asleep intelligence) was a considerably success. During that year he dedicated himself to promoting his live material. In 2010 he opened the Maquinaria Festival, and has been in Lollapalooza Chile, 2 times at the Vive Latino Festival in Mexico.

In 2010 he recorded his second album, Cripta y vida, in the same El Ártico studio, owned by Leonel García in Mexico, recordings that were finished in Santiago in his own home studio and then under the supervision of the Chilean engineer and producer Hernán Rojas. This album is released in 2011 and the singles Vacaciones en el más allá, Occidental and En esta mansión were released from it. This album allowed Pedropiedra to consolidate itself as a recurring figure in the Chilean independent scene and it was worth presenting his music in several countries, including Argentina, Brazil, Ecuador, Mexico and Spain. For the 31-minute live performance at Lollapalooza Chile 2012, Pedro collaborates as a drummer, becoming an important member of the band of the puppet series.

In May 2016 he collaborated live with Mon Laferte with the song «El diablo» in his presentation at the Cariola Theater, and on December 18, 2017 he participated as the opening act for the Chilean singer-songwriter show at the Movistar Arena

He separated from this in April 2018, to dedicate himself more to his fifth solo album, Aló!, and to the project of Pillanes, a band that he founded with the brothers Pablo and Felipe Ilabaca (from Chancho en Piedra), and Francisco and Mauricio Durán (from Los Bunkers). With this group he released a self-titled album in November 2018, Pillanes.

In 2013 he released his third studio album called Emanuel with the single Pasajero which won the Altazor award as best pop song. In 2016 he released his fourth studio album called Ocho with the single Todos los días. In 2020 he released his fifth studio album called Aló! with the single Amar en silencio.

== Discography ==
=== Studio solo albums ===
- 2009: Pedropiedra
- 2011: Cripta y vida
- 2013: Emanuel
- 2016: Ocho
- 2020: Aló!
- 2024: Tótem
