= Ximena Abarca =

Chilean pop singer and actress

María Ximena Abarca Tapia
- Born: September 24, 1981 (age 44); Santiago, Chile
- Origin: Chile
- Genres: Pop
- Years active: 2003–present
- Label: Music World
- Website: https://web.archive.org/web/20060804094730/http://ximenaabarca.com:80/

Ximena Abarca (born September 24, 1981, in Santiago, Chile) is a Chilean pop singer and actress. She debuted in 2003 as a solo artist at the Chilean TV show Protagonistas de la Musica. She won the first place in the TV show. She released her first studio album in 2003 entitled "Punto de Partida" under the Warner label.

== Discography ==
=== Studio albums ===
Albums

Punto de Partida

1st Studio album

Released: January 2004 (Chile)

Chile peak position: No. 1

singles

"El Juego de la Resistencia"

"Amor Violento"

"Alguien"

Chile certification: Gold

Chilean sales: 9000

Provocacion

2nd Studio album

Released: April 10, 2006 (Chile)

Chile peak position: No. 2

singles

"Profano o Sagrado"

Chile sales: 3000

== Notes ==
Abarca performed on Teleton at the 2007 edition of Teleton.

== See also ==
- List of Chileans
- Latin Pop
