= Academic grading in Chile =

The grade point average (GPA) in Chile ranges from 1.0 up to 7.0 (with one decimal place).

Rounding of averages is generally done to the second decimal; hence, a 3.95 is rounded up to a 4.0, whereas a 3.94 is rounded down to a 3.9.

Usually in higher level education such as university degrees, 80% of the passing grades are in the 4.5 – 5.4 range and a grade exceeding 5.0 is normally considered "good". While in the U.S. highly competitive students have A grades, in Chile these same students tend to average 6,8, 6,9 or 7,0, all of which are considered near perfect grades.

An overall GPA in university degrees that ranges from 5.5 to 5.9 is uncommon and is considered a "very good" academic standing. Exceeding 6.0 is considered "high academic excellence".

Table of Chilean GPA
GPA	% Achievement	Meaning	Honours
6.0 – 7.0	87% – 100%	Outstanding (7.0)	Highest Honours
5.0 – 5.9	73% – 86%	Good	Honours
4.0 – 4.9	60% – 72%	Sufficient	Passed
3.0 – 3.9	40% – 59%	Less than Sufficient	Failed
2.0 – 2.9	20% – 39%	Deficient	Failed
1.0 – 1.9	0% – 19%	Very Deficient	Failed
