= Plan Z (TV series) =

Chilean television show

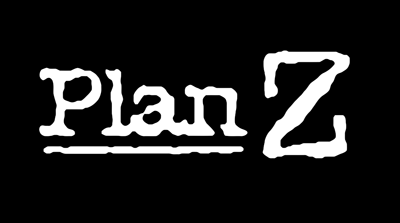
- Title card
- Genre: Comedy; Sketch; Politically incorrect humor Social satire Surreal humour Black comedy
- Starring: Álvaro Díaz, Pedro Peirano, Ángel Carcavilla, Carolina Delpiano, Rafael Gumucio, Vanessa Miller, Marco Silva
- Country of origin: Chile
- Original language: Spanish
- No. of seasons: 2

Production
- Production locations: Santiago, Chile
- Running time: 30 minutes (with commercials)
- Production company: Aplaplac

Original release
- Network: Canal 2 Rock & Pop
- Release: January 1997 – 1998

Plan Z was a comedic Chilean TV show broadcast between 1997 and 1998 in the now-defunct Chilean TV channel Canal 2 Rock & Pop, made up of short sketches, usually containing absurdist surrealist and sometimes politically incorrect humor, created by Angel Carcavilla, Carolina Delpiano, Rafael Gumucio, Pedro Peirano and Alvaro Díaz. It would often show parodies of real life situations, ridiculized stereotypes, and elements that made fun of a post-dictatorship Chile through irony.

Its name is based on "Plan Z", which was a supposed plan by the Salvador Allende administration to commit a self-coup in an attempt to establish a Marxist state with the help of the MIR and of the Cuban government. The existence of this plan was supposedly confirmed by the military, but the CIA later confirmed that it was just a product of war propaganda.

The show would be given various sanctions from the CNTV due to some of the more controversial actions of the show, such as making fun of the Bible in one of the sketches called "Noche de Libros: La Biblia" and ridiculizing Salvador Allende in "Vuestros Hombres, Valientes Soldados". In January 1998, after having gained eight charges overall, the broadcast of the show was cancelled, without ever finishing its second season.

== Members ==
The crew of Plan Z was made up of various journalists, writers, actors, and actresses:

- Ángel Carcavilla; then-journalist and publicist.
- Carolina Delpiano; TV hostess and actress.
- Rafael Gumucio; literary critic and writer.
- Álvaro Díaz; journalist and TV producer.
- Pedro Peirano; journalist and TV producer.
- Vanessa Miller; actress, writer, dancer, and TV hostess.
- Marco Silva; graphic designer and writer.
