= Ayer y Hoy =

Ayer y Hoy may refer to:

- Ayer y Hoy (Menudo album), 1985
- Ayer y Hoy (Ana Gabriel album), 1994
- Ayer y Hoy (film), a 1934 Argentine musical romantic drama film
