= Álvaro Díaz González =

Chilean journalist, producer and director

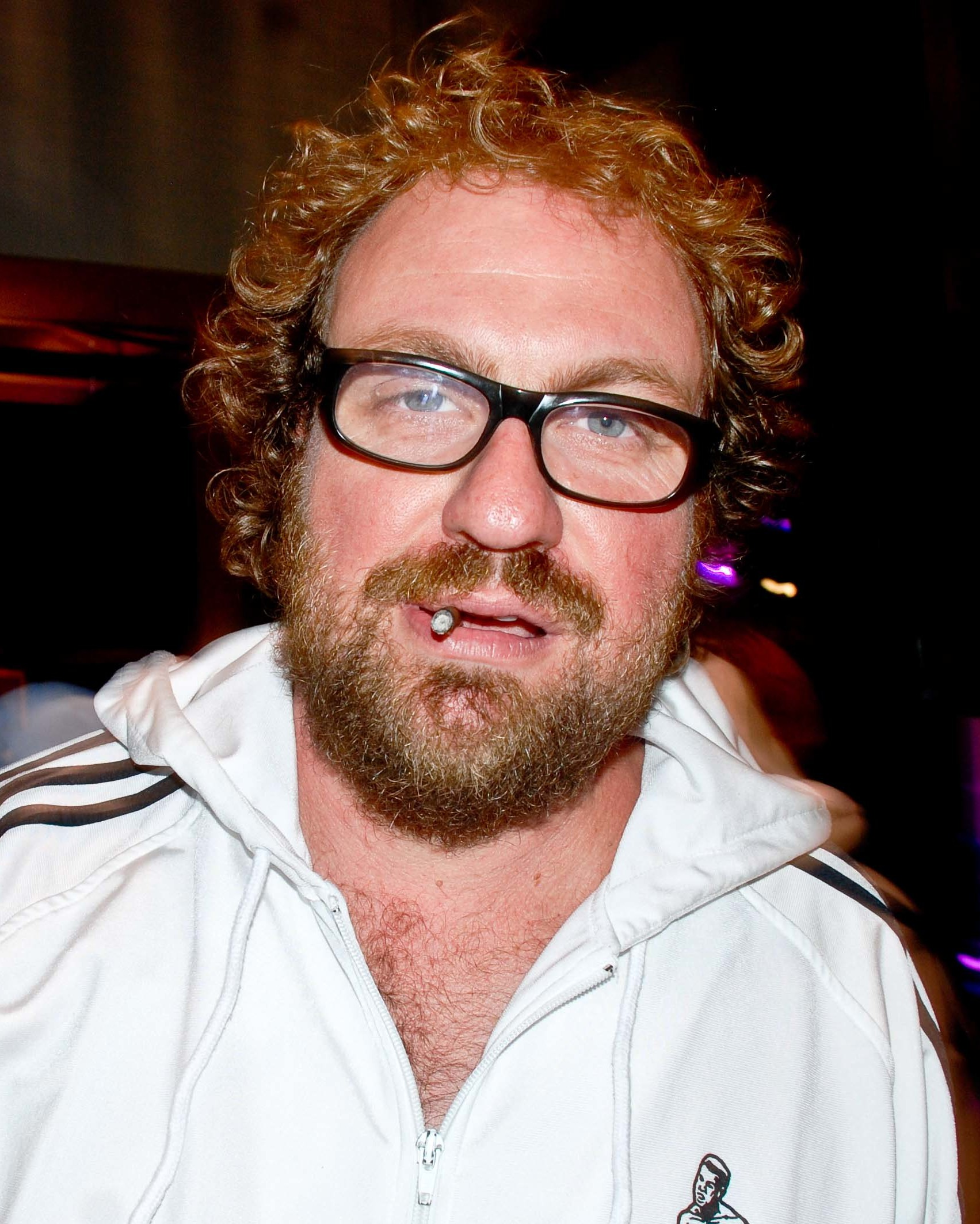
- Díaz in 2011
- Born: 1972 (age 53–54); Santiago, Chile
- Education: University of Chile (B.J.)
- Occupations: Journalist, producer and director
- Years active: 1996–present
- Notable work: 31 Minutos

Álvaro Díaz González (born 1972) is a Chilean journalist, producer and director.

Díaz is the co-creator of the TV series 31 Minutos (2003–2005). He also worked on TV series such as the 31 Minutos spin-off Las vacaciones de Tulio, Patana y el pequeño Tim (2009), Sangre, sudor y lágrimas (2004), Mira tú (2002), Plan Z (1997–1998) and El Factor Humano (1998–1999). He directed 31 minutos, la película (2008), Los Dibujos de Bruno Kulczewski (2004) and various music videos for Chilean musician Pedropiedra as well as the single Una nube cuelga sobre mí by Los Bunkers.

Díaz is a graduate of the University of Chile, where he studied journalism. Along with his frequent collaborator, Pedro Peirano, he founded the independent Chilean production company Aplaplac in 2001.

He was given the Altazor Award in 2000 for El Factor Humano, and won it a second time in 2004 for 31 Minutos.

== Filmography ==
=== As director ===
==== Film ====
- 31 minutos, la película (2008); co-directed with Pedro Peirano.
- Los dibujos de Bruno Kulczewski (2004); co-directed with Pedro Peirano.
- Nunca digas nunca jamás (1998); co-directed with Pedro Peirano.

==== Television ====
- Las vacaciones de Tulio, Patana y el pequeño Tim (2009); co-directed with Pedro Peirano.
- Sangre, sudor y lágrimas (2004); co-directed with Pedro Peirano.
- 31 minutos (2003); co-directed with Pedro Peirano.
- Mira tú (2002); co-directed with Pedro Peirano.
- El factor humano (1998); co-directed with Pedro Peirano.

=== As screenwriter ===
==== Film ====
- El Bosque de Karadima (2015)
- Paseo de oficina (2012)
- 31 minutos, la película (2008)
- Los dibujos de Bruno Kulczewski (2004)

==== Television ====
- Las vacaciones de Tulio, Patana y el pequeño Tim (2009)
- 31 minutos (2003)
- Mira tú (2002)
- Plan Z (1997)

=== As producer ===
- Un país serio (2009)
- Gato por liebre (1996)

=== As actor ===
Film

- 31 minutos, la película (2008); voice of Juan Carlos Bodoque, Balón von Bola & Rosario Central
