= Rodrigo Salinas (comedian) =

Chilean screenwriter

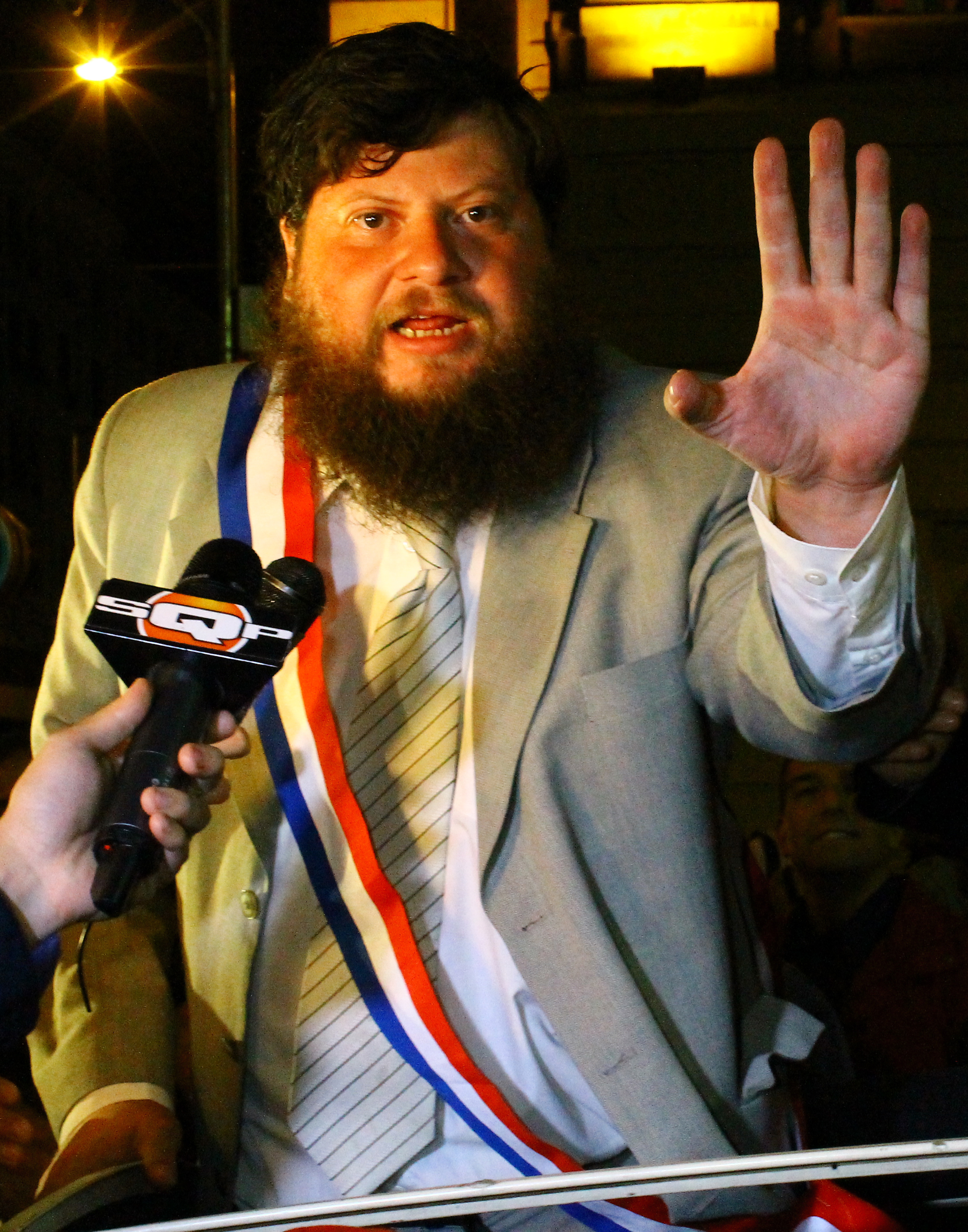
- Rodrigo Salinas in 2012
- Born: Rodrigo Salvador Salinas Marambio; February 1, 1975 (age 51); Santiago, Chile
- Education: Colegio San Ignacio
- Occupations: Cartoonist, writer, actor, comedian, musician.
- Political party: Communist Party of Chile
- Children: Laura & Salvador

Rodrigo Salvador Salinas Marambio (born 1 February 1975), also known as Guatón Salinas (lit: Fatty Salinas), is a Chilean cartoonist, writer, actor and comedian, well-known for being one of the founders of the art collective La Nueva Gráfica Chilena and for being a singer-songwriter, director, and voice actor of the children's program 31 Minutos. He is also part of the cast of the comedy space El club de la comedia.

== Biography ==
He is the son of Luis Enrique Salinas Campos (dirigent of the MAPU OC) and María Angélica Marambio Díaz. He received the middle name Salvador, in homage to Chilean ex-president Salvador Allende, and the first name Rodrigo, in homage to Rodrigo Ambrosio, founder of the MAPU.

He studied in the San Ignacio school from first grade up until 12th grade, after which he went to the University of Chile, where he graduated in the arts.

=== Career ===
In 2000, he founded the collective La Nueva Gráfica Chilena with Andrés Castillo, Rodrigo Lagos, César Gabler and Matías Iglesis, whose mission is to produce comics, magazines, exhibitions and also small short films. Salinas has also created and released several comic books, including Rata Galdames, Morgan Shila, Carlitos Marx, El Reino del Sí, Arturo Prat Is Not Dead and Una Novela Ecuestre.

In May 2005, he and another group of friends created the publishing house Feroces Editores, which distributes material of Chilean cartoonists.

In 2002, he published his comic book Canal 76, in the Wikén magazine, in the newspaper El Mercurio', his comic book Canal 76.

From 2003 to 2005, he was one of the editors and scriptwriters of the children's program 31 minutos, along with doing the voices of characters like Juanín Juan Harry and Mario Hugo. Salinas also participated in Experimento Wayapolis, a children's TV series, which, like 31 minutos, was broadcast on TVN.

In 2007, Salinas launched a book with a Canal 76 treasury book.

In 2008 he became a scriptwriter and actor in the TV show El Club de la Comedia, broadcast by CHV.

Since November 2011, he joined the morning program of Chilevisión, 7 días, which was broadcast on Sunday mornings and where he conducted El mundo según Rodrigo Salinas, a section in which he toured places of Santiago.

He participated in the election of Rey Guachaca on April 19, 2012, in the popular festival Gran Cumbre Guachaca in the Centro Cultural Estación Mapocho, which he won in a vote made through the Internet. Together with Scarleth Cárdenas they celebrated the traditional party in the popular bar La Piojera.

In 2014, he starred in the satirical movie Fuerzas especiales. In 2015, he again played the same paper in its sequel.

In 2017, he starred in La mentirita blanca, a film that premiered at the Miami Film Festival and won the award for best screenplay.

=== Personal life ===
Salinas was married to María Teresa Viera-Gallo Chadwick from 2008 until 2018, who is the daughter of politician and exminister José Antonio Viera-Gallo and of María Teresa Chadwick Piñera (sister of Andrés Chadwick). He also has one son, Salvador, and one daughter, Laura.

He is a self-declared leftist and participated in the TV ads for Eduardo Frei Ruiz-Tagle during the 2009–10 Chilean presidential election. He also supported Michelle Bachelet during the 2013 election. In 2005, he joined the campaign to grow the Communist Party of Chile, as to reach the 18,000 legally required members.
