= 31 minutos, la película =

2008 Chilean adventure comedy puppet film directed by Álvaro Díaz and Pedro Peirano

- Theatrical release poster
- Directed by: Álvaro Díaz; Pedro Peirano
- Written by: Pedro Peirano; Álvaro Díaz; Daniel Castro; Rodrigo Salinas
- Based on: 31 minutos by Álvaro Díaz; Pedro Peirano
- Produced by: Juan Manuel Egaña
- Starring: Pedro Peirano; Alvaro Díaz; Rodrigo Salinas; Alejandra Dueñas; Daniel Castro; Francisco Schultz; Patricio Díaz
- Cinematography: Miguel Littin
- Edited by: Galut Alarcón; Felipe Lacerda
- Music by: Pablo Ilabaca; Angelo Pierattini
- Production companies: Aplaplac; MGP Filmes; Total Entertainment LG; User T-38
- Distributed by: MC Films (Chile); H2O Filmes (Brazil)
- Release dates: March 27, 2008 (Chile); August 3, 2012 (Brazil)
- Running time: 83 minutes
- Countries: Chile; Brazil
- Languages: Spanish; Portuguese
- Budget: $2.5 million
- Box office: $1,253,971

31 minutos, la película (lit. '31 minutes, the movie') is a 2008 adventure comedy puppet film based on the Chilean puppet television show 31 minutos, directed by Álvaro Díaz and Pedro Peirano. The film premiere for the public had been scheduled since late 2006, but was delayed for several improvements in its post-production phase, including conducting a contest to find the voices of some characters. The film premiered in Chile on March 27, 2008, and was released in Brazil on August 3, 2012.

== Plot ==
On a remote island, a Blonde Buffalo, a rare and uncommon creature on the island, attempts to flee, but is stopped by the island's owner, Cachirula, and her assistant, Wool Star. As she grieves how the animals in her collection despise her, Cachirula meets with smuggler Tío Pelado, who promises to give her the last Juanín, the most valuable animal on Earth.

In mainland Chile, Juanín is the producer of the news program 31 Minutos, headed by the bumbling anchor, Tulio Triviño. Juanín has arranged a gift for Tulio, but fears he will be fired if anything goes wrong. The program begins with a live broadcast of the celebration, culminating in the unveiling of Tulio's portrait, which Tío Pelado has repainted to display Tulio sitting on a toilet. Tulio, upset by the humiliating image, fires Juanín, who is then tricked by Tío Pelado into coming with him to the docks. The crew finds evidence of Juanín's innocence and unsuccessfully attempt to save Juanín.

At the docks, a guilt-ridden Tulio rallies the cast to rescue Juanín by using his private yacht to pursue the boat. While stuck at sea, the crew discover via a broadcast that Cachirula has Juanín captive. At her zoo, Cachirula convinces Juanín that his friends no longer care for him, and disposes of Tío Pelado as the only remaining witness.

During a storm, journalist Juan Carlos Bodoque is thrown overboard and lost at sea, after which the boat is swallowed by a whale where they find Tío Pelado. Upon exiting the whale, they land on Cachirula's island. Meanwhile, Juan Carlos is captured by a tribe of Huachimingos and want to kill him because they believe he is Tío Pelado, but free him after proving his identity.

Guided by Tío Pelado, Tulio arrives at Cachirula's castle and unsuccessfully tries to apologize to Juanín. The next day, Juan Carlos arrives with the Huachimingos at the beach and reunites with the crew. Juanín explores an off-limits area of the zoo and discovers Blonde Buffalo was beheaded for rejecting Cachirula, convincing him of her evil intentions. Cachirula orders Juanín to be executed, but a captive member of the Huachimingo tribe escapes and informs the crew.

The crew declares war and a battle ensues between the news crew, aided by the species that suffered Cachirula's kidnappings, and Cachirula's army of dolls. Tulio, Huachimingo and Juan Carlos infiltrate the castle, save Juanín, and release the remaining animals, but Cachirula re-captures Juanín and throws him off a cliff. Tulio jumps to save Juanín, and both are saved by the whale that swallowed them earlier. Vowing revenge, Cachirula and Wool Star flee in their hovercraft, but it malfunctions and explodes.

In the aftermath of the battle, Juan Carlos expresses his interest in staying with the Huachimingos, but he changes his mind upon learning that their spots are tattoos. Meanwhile, the crew and the animals throw a party in celebration of their victory.

== Characters ==
- Juanín Juan Harry – A white, fluffy creature, the only one of his kind. Producer of 31 Minutos
- Tulio Triviño Tufillo – The narcissistic conductor and lead anchor of 31 Minutos
- Juan Carlos Bodoque – A red rabbit with a gambling problem and popular journalist on 31 Minutos.
- Patricia Ana "Patana" Tufillo Triviño – Tulio's niece and a young reporter
- Ernesto Felipe Mario Hugo – An awkward chihuahua and reporter in love with Patana
- Policarpo Avendaño – A news commentator
- Balón Von Bola – The talking soccer ball with a hearing problem. Works as a sports commentator
- Cachirula – Selfish millionaire and collector of rare animals
- Tío Pelado – Smuggler and conman working for Cachirula
- Wool Star – Cachirula's assistant
- Huachimingo – A spotted animal abducted for Cachirula's zoo
- Vicho – A lone bug living on Tío Pelado's ship.

== Sequel ==
On October 5, 2024, the official YouTube account of Amazon Prime Video revealed a teaser trailer of what would be another 31 Minutos film, which was announced to be released in November 2025.
