= Chancho en Piedra =

Chilean rock band

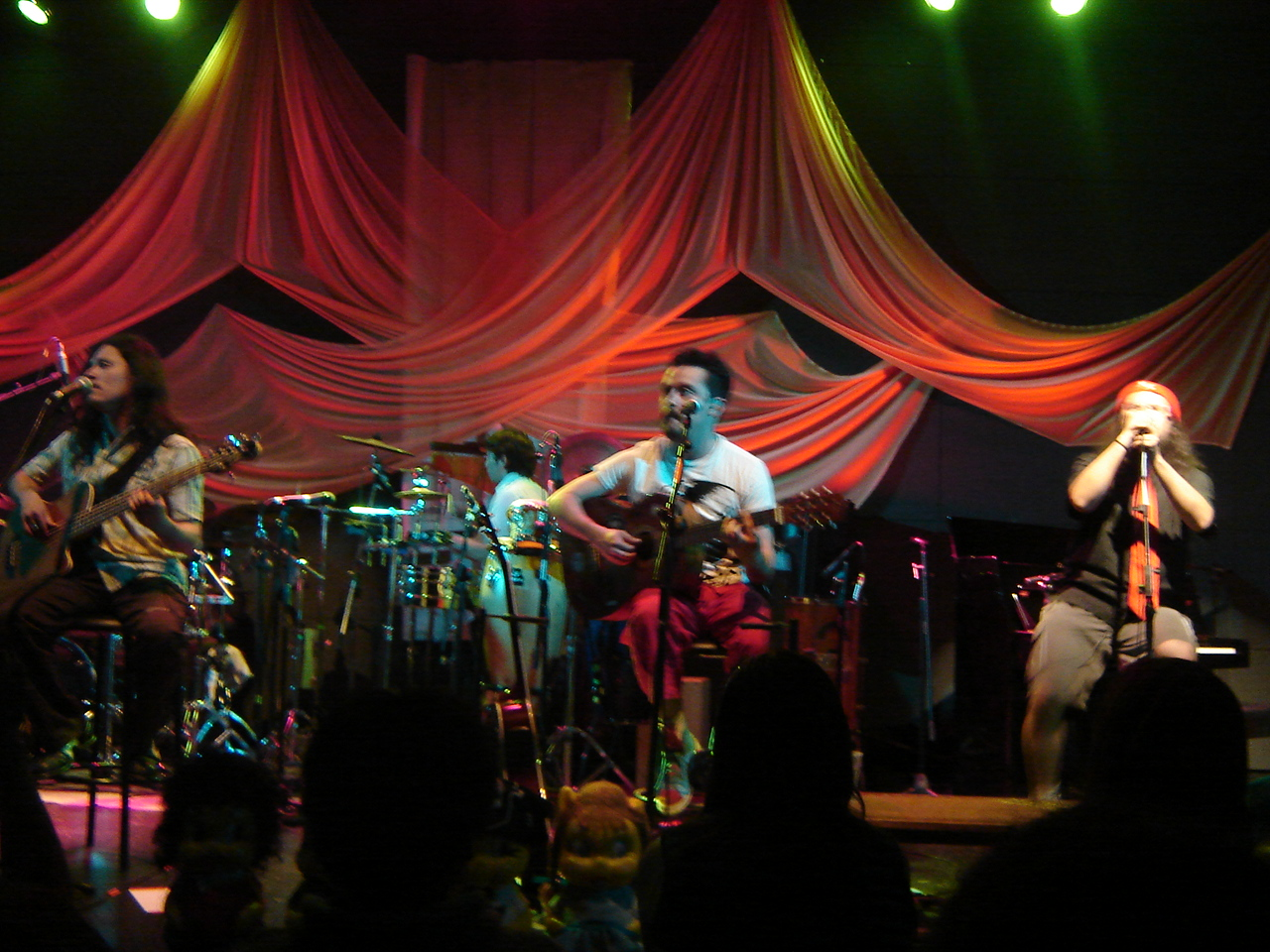
Chancho en Piedra in SCD

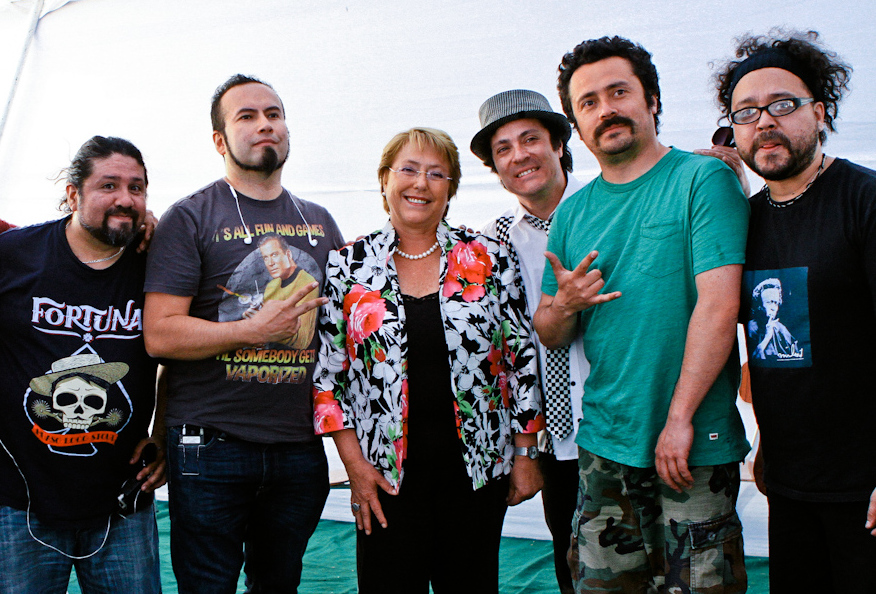
Chancho en Piedra with Michelle Bachelet in her 2013 presidencial campaign

Chancho en Piedra (Note: Chancho en piedra is a Chilean salsa.) is a Chilean funk rock band, considered influential in the popularization of alternative rock in Latin America. They are commonly described as similar to the Red Hot Chili Peppers, but are also known for their unique sound and goofy style. Their participation in community related events – playing benefits for the Chilean National Commission of Scientific and Technological Investigation and contributing songs to the popular Chilean children's puppet show 31 Minutos – and their proliferation as artists – having released 11 albums since their debut in 1995 – has gained them widespread familiarity. Their popularity has spread not only in Latin America but internationally as well, allowing them to perform at Memphis' Beale Street Music Festival in May 2009.

In 2023 the band announced an indefinite hiatus on their official Instagram channel, for its members to focus on their personal life projects.

== Discography ==
=== Studio albums ===
- Peor es mascar lauchas (It is worse to chew Rats) (1995)
- La dieta del lagarto (The lizard diet) (1997)
- Ríndanse terrícolas (Give up earthlings) (1998)
- Marca Chancho (Pig Brand) (2000)
  All tracks are written by Chancho en Piedra, except stated otherwise.
  Marca Chancho
  No.	Title	Length
  1.	"Popular condimento"	0:32
  2.	"Buenos días a todos"	5:16
  3.	"Eligiendo una reina"	4:06
  4.	"Lophophora"	2:24
  5.	"Historias de amor y condón"	4:48
  6.	"Kiltro virtual"	3:39
  7.	"Quiero comer..."	0:09
  8.	"El curanto" (Raúl de Ramón)	4:20
  9.	"Mampato"	6:47
  10.	"Brocacochi"	2:43
  11.	"Los huilles"	0:26
  12.	"Hermanos marranos"	3:17
  13.	"El día en que los gatos hicieron las paces con los ratones" (Pablo Ilabaca, Florcita Motuda)	3:29
  14.	"Me vuelvo mono"	4:00
  15.	"Patá en la raja"	1:53
  16.	"El durazno y el melón"	4:02
- El tinto elemento (The red element) (2002)
- Chancho 6 (CD & DVD) (Pig 6) (2004)
- Desde el Batiscafo (From the Bathyscaphe) (2005)
- Combo Show (2009)
- Otra cosa es con guitarra (Another thing is with guitar) (2011)
- La porcina comedia (The Porcine Comedy) (2013)
- Funkybarítico, Hedónico, Fantástico (Funkybaritic, Hedonic, Fantastic) (2016)

=== Compilation albums ===
- Grandes éxitos de ayer y oink! (Greatest hits from yesterday and oink!) (2007)
- Grandes videos de ayer y oink! (Great videos from yesterday and oink!) (2008)

Note: "ayer y oink!" is a pun for the standard term in compilation albums "Ayer y Hoy" ("yesterday and today")
