= Paola Lattus =

Chilean actress

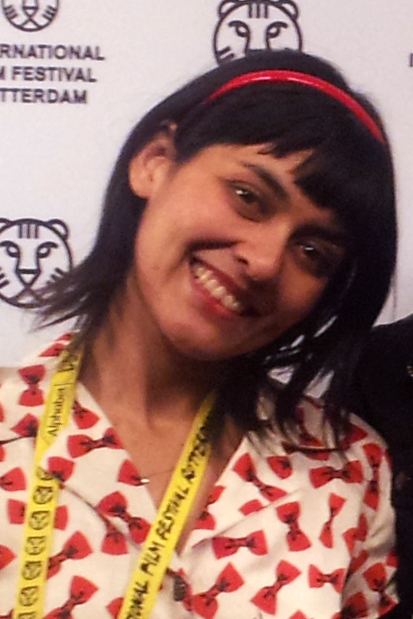
- Lattus in 2012
- Born: Paola Andrea Lattus Ramos; 19 August 1980 (age 46); Antofagasta, Chile
- Education: Fernando González Acting School
- Occupations: Actress, theater director, teacher
- Parents: Ángel Lattus (father); Teresa Ramos (mother)
- Awards: APES Award (2009); Antofagasta International Film Festival (2011)

Paola Andrea Lattus Ramos (born 19 August 1980) is a Chilean film, theater, and television actress, known for appearing in films such as Tony Manero (2008) by Pablo Larraín and Optical Illusions (2009) by Cristián Jiménez.

== Biography ==
The daughter of distinguished theater actors Ángel Lattus and Teresa Ramos, Paola Lattus began to develop her theatrical career at age 11 in the Theater Company of the University of Antofagasta, participating in a dozen plays, in addition to the Harlequin Theater Company, founded by her own mother in the same city.

In 2000 she entered the Fernando González Acting School. After graduating, she organized summer workshops for teenagers at the Harlequin Theater Company, in which she tried to convey the importance of theater as a reflection on the social environment. She has also conducted acting classes at the University of Chile and University UCINF, among others.

She began her film career in 2008 in the Pablo Larraín drama Tony Manero. The following year, she received an APES Award for Best Supporting Actress for her work in Optical Illusions (2009) by Cristián Jiménez. She was also nominated for a Pedro Sienna Award for the same film.

In 2011 she received the Best Actress award at the Antofagasta International Film Festival for La jubilada by Jairo Boisier.

== Film ==
=== Features ===
| Year | Title | Role | Director |
|---|---|---|---|
| 2008 | Tony Manero | Pauli | Pablo Larraín |
| 2009 | Optical Illusions | Manuela | Cristián Jiménez |
| 2009 | Mitómana | Yeni | José Luis Sepúlveda |
| 2011 | Bonsái | Notebook seller | Cristián Jiménez |
| 2011 | Efectos Especiales | Paola | Bernardo Quesney |
| 2012 | La jubilada | Fabiola Neira | Jairo Boisier |
| 2012 | Ambas tres | Susana | Samuel Sotomayor |
| 2013 | The Summer of Flying Fish | Ester | Marcela Said |
| 2014 | Desastres naturales | Patricia | Bernardo Quesney |
| 2015 | La mujer de barro | Violeta | Sergio Castro San Martín |
| 2015 | The Club | | Pablo Larraín |
| 2016 | Los perros | | Marcela Said |
| 2016 | American Huaso | Mauricio | José Palma |
| 2016 | Sin dejar hablar | | Pamela Álvarez |
| 2016 | A Fantastic Woman | Enfermera | Sebastián Lelio |
| 2017 | Too Late to Die Young | | Dominga Sotomayor Castillo |
| 2023 | Outsider Girls | | Alexandra Hyland |

=== Shorts ===
| Year | Title | Role | Director |
|---|---|---|---|
| 2005 | Quitapenas | Encuestadora | José María de Ferari and Matías Pinochet |
| 2011 | Al otro lado del río | Ana | Bárbara Pestan |
| 2011 | Titanes | Angélica | Edison Cájas |
| 2013 | Asunción | Asunción | Camila Luna |

=== TV series ===
| Year | Title | Role | Channel |
|---|---|---|---|
| 2011 | Prófugos | | HBO |
| 2012 | Minero | Delia Carrillo | Antofagasta TV |
| 2017 | Ramona | Carmen | TVN |

== Theater ==
=== As actress ===
- 1991 – Mariana Pineda (University of Antofagasta Theater Company)
- 2003 – Amador Ausente (Harlequin Theater Company)
- 2005 – La Reina Isabel cantaba Rancheras (University of Antofagasta Theater Company)
- 2007 – Niño Pecado (Harlequin Theater Company)
- 2007 – El niño y las estrellas (Harlequin Theater Company)
- 2008 – Kaspar
- 2008 – Europa
- 2008 – El Pelícano (La Cualquiera Theater Company)
- 2010 – TeLARAÑA (Harlequin Theater Company)
- 2010 – Colo Colo 91 (Hermanos Ibarra Roa Theater Company)
- 2011 – Fatamorgana de Amor con banda de música (University of Antofagasta Theater Company)
- 2012 – Venecia (Harlequin Theater Company)
- 2013 – Víctor sin Víctor Jara
- 2013 – El Otro (Niño Proletario Theater Company)
- 2014 – Barrio Miseria (Niño Proletario Theater Company)
- 2015 – El homosexual o la dificultad de expresarse
- 2012 – El Otro (Niño Proletario Theater Company)
- 2016 – Fulgor (Niño Proletario Theater Company)

=== As director ===
- 2005 – Electra e Ifigenia (hablan ante un cuerpo) (La Cualquiera Theater Company)
- 2007 – La historia de la gaviota y el gato que le enseñó a volar (Harlequin Theater Company)
- 2008 – El Pelícano (La Cualquiera Theater Company)
- 2008 – Palomita Blanca (Harlequin Theater Company)
- 2011 – Partido Boca Arriba
- 2012 – Carabinero (Harlequin Theater Company)
- 2012 – Ekeko (o el anhelo del mar)

=== As assistant director ===
- 2014 – Barrio Miseria (Niño Proletario Theater Company)
- 2015 – La pandilla del Arcoiris (Harlequin Theater Company)

== Awards and recognitions ==
=== Film ===
| Year | Award | Category | Title | Result |
|---|---|---|---|---|
| 2008 | North of Chile International Film Festival | Germana Fernández Recognition | For the support of regional theater in Antofagasta | Winner |
| 2009 | APES Award | Best Supporting Actress | Optical Illusions | Winner |
| 2010 | Pedro Sienna Awards | Best Supporting Actress Performance | Optical Illusions | Nominee |
| 2011 | Antofagasta International Film Festival | Best Actress | La jubilada | Winner |
| 2013 | Gijón International Film Festival | Best Actress | Asunción | Winner |

=== Theater ===
| Year | Award | Category | Title | Result |
|---|---|---|---|---|
| 2007 | 7th University of Chile New Theater Directors Festival | Best Director | Electra e Ifigenia (hablan ante un cuerpo) | Winner |
| 2007 | 7th University of Chile New Theater Directors Festival | Best Playwright | Electra e Ifigenia (hablan ante un cuerpo) | Honorable Mention |
| 2007 | 7th University of Chile New Theater Directors Festival | Best Actress | Electra e Ifigenia (hablan ante un cuerpo) | Honorable Mention |
