= Inti Briones =

Peruvian cinematographer, producer, actor and film director

Inti Briones Arredondo (born in 1971 in Peru) is a cinematographer and film producer. He is known for his work in various media formats, media digital video and motion picture film. In 2013, he was named as one of Variety Magazine's "10 Cinematographers to Watch.". His work has been noted for the sensitivity with which he approaches both rural and urban locations in different parts of the world. He has worked with Chilean filmmakers such as Raúl Ruiz, José Luis Torres Leiva, Cristián Jiménez, Alejandro Fernández Almendras and Dominga Sotomayor Castillo. Briones grew up in Lima with his Chilean mother, Sybila Arredondo, widow of José María Arguedas. At the age of 15, in Peru, he entered the Armando Robles Godoy Film and Television School. In his early 20's, he moved to Santiago, Chile; although he had already taken film courses in Peru and workshops in France, he was determined to study with Héctor Ríos Henríquez, director of photography of El chacal de Nahueltoro.

Early on he began working with Chilean directors like Raúl Ruiz, Ignacio Agüero, Pablo Perelman nd Andrés Racz. In 1996, he served as president of the Chilean Association of Short Filmmakers and on 26 November 2015 he became a founding member of the Chilean Association of Cinematography ACC.

His work now continues developing around the world, with focus in Latin America, although he has been in different continents deepening in his creative journeys with a special diversity of directors such as Walter Salles, Paula Gaitán, Julia Lokvet, Felipe Hirsch, Daniela Thomas, Joanna Lombardi, David Schurman, Ofir Raul Graizer, Andre Warwar, Jayro Bustamante, Francisca Alegría and Aly Muritiba, among others.

He is currently a member and bearer of the initials of the Brazilian Association of Cinematography ABC, Association of Authors of Peruvian Cinematography DFP and the Chilean Association of Cinematography ACC.

He has also been a producer of the film Song Without a Name by Melina León that was part of the Directors Fortnight section at the 2019 Cannes Film Festival and co-producer of Too Late to Die Young" by Dominga Sotomayor, winner of the Best Director Award at the Locarno Film Festival. He also was co-producer in Matar un Hombre by Alejandro Fernández and Crimen de Gavea by Adré Warwar, also associate producer of Banquete by Daniela Thomas and in Aqui No Ha Pasado Nada by Alejandro Fernández.

== Filmography ==
- Cofralandes, Chilean Rhapsody (2002)
- Days in the Country (2004)
- La Recta Provincia (2007)
- The Sky, the Earth and the Rain (2008)
- Nucingen House (2008)
- Optical Illusions (2009)
- Huacho (2009)
- Summer (2011)
- Ulysses (2011)
- Bonsái (2011)
- The Loneliest Planet (2011)
- Night Across the Street (2012)
- The Summer of Flying Fish (2013)
- The Quispe Girls (2014)
- To Kill a Man (2014)
- Voice Over (2014)
- United Passions (2014)
- Much Ado About Nothing (2016)
- The Blind Christ (2016)
- Little Secret (2016)
- Vazante (2017)
- Too Late to Die Young (2018)
- Song Without a Name (2019)
- Hebe: A Estrela do Brasil (2019)
- The Cow Who Sang a Song Into the Future (2021)
- The Mother and the Bear (2024)
- Rita (2024)
- Ramón and Ramón (2024)

== Awards ==
  - Pedro Sienna Awards Best Cinematography "The Sky, the Earth and the Rain" (2009)
  - Pedro Sienna Awards Best Cinematography "Optical Illusions" (2010)
  - Pedro Sienna Awards Best Cinematography "Bonsai" (2012)
  - RiverRun International Film Festival, Best Cinematography The Summer of Flying Fish (2013)
  - Venice Film Festival, Premio Fedeora Best Cinematography The Quispe Girls (2014)
  - Festival de Cine Latinoamericano de Lima, Best Cinematography The Quispe Girls (2014)
  - Pedro Sienna Awards Best Cinematography "The Summer of Flying Fish" (2014)
  - Havana Film Festival, Best Cinematography Much Ado About Nothing (2016)
  - Pedro Sienna Awards Best Cinematography "The Quispe Girls" (2016)
  - Gijón International Film Festival, Best Cinematography "Too Late to Die Young" (2018)
  - Huelva Ibero-American Film Festival Best Cinematography "Song Without a Name" (2019)
  - Festival de cine de Ceará Best Cinematography "Song Without a Name" (2019)
  - Stockholm International Film Festival Best Cinematography "Song Without a Name" (2019)
