= 2019 Stockholm International Film Festival =

Film festival edition

- Opening film: Marriage Story
- Closing film: Jojo Rabbit
- Location: Stockholm, Sweden
- Founded: 1990
- Awards: Bronze Horse (Song Without a Name by Melina León)
- No. of films: 150
- Festival date: 6–17 November 2019
- Website: stockholmfilmfestival.se/en

Stockholm International Film Festival
- 2020 2018

The 30th Stockholm International Film Festival took place on 6–17 November 2019 in Stockholm, Sweden.

Peruvian drama film Song Without a Name won the Bronze Horse, most prestigious award. Noah Baumbach's Marriage Story served as the opening film for the 30th edition. Jojo Rabbit closed the festival.

== Official selections ==
=== Competition ===
English title	Original title	Director(s)	Production countrie(s)
Alice and the Mayor	Alice et le maire	Nicolas Pariser	France, Belgium
Arab Blues		Manele Labidi Labbé	France, Tunisia
The Audition	Das Vorspiel	Ina Weisse	Germany
Bait		Mark Jenkin	United Kingdom
Corpus Christi	Boże Ciało	Jan Komasa	Poland
Dirty God		Sacha Polak	United Kingdom, Netherlands, Belgium, Ireland
Divine Love	Divino Amor	Gabriel Mascaro	Brazil, Uruguay, Chile, Denmark, Norway, Sweden
Fire Will Come	O que arde	Oliver Laxe	Spain, France, Luxembourg
I Lost My Body	J'ai perdu mon corps	Jérémy Clapin	France
Les Misérables		Ladj Ly	France
The Lighthouse		Robert Eggers	United States
Made in Bangladesh		Rubaiyat Hossain	France, Bangladesh, Denmark, Portugal
Monos		Alejandro Landes	Colombia, Argentina, Netherlands, Germany, Denmark
Sanctorum		Joshua Gil	Mexico, Dominican Republic, Qatar
Song Without a Name	Canción sin nombre	Melina León	Peru, Spain, United States, Chile
Synonyms	Synonymes	Nadav Lapid	France, Israel, Germany
You Deserve a Lover	Tu mérites un amour	Hafsia Herzi	France

=== American Independents ===
English title	Original title	Director(s)	Production countrie(s)
The Art of Self-Defense		Riley Stearns	United States
Brittany Runs a Marathon		Paul Downs Colaizzo	United States
Bull		Annie Silverstein	United States
End of Sentence		Elfar Adalsteins	Iceland, Ireland, United States
Give Me Liberty		Kirill Mikhanovsky	United States
Lingua Franca		Isabel Sandoval	United States, Philippines
Mickey and the Bear		Annabelle Attanasio	United States
Sound of Silence		Michael Tyburski	United States
Sword of Trust		Lynn Shelton	United States
Them That Follow		Britt Poulton, Dan Madison Savage	United States

=== Discovery ===
English title	Original title	Director(s)	Production countrie(s)
Africa		Oren Gerner	Israel
Alice		Josephine Mackerras	United Kingdom, Australia, France
Animals		Sophie Hyde	United Kingdom, Australia, Ireland
A Brother's Love	La femme de mon frère	Monia Chokri	Canada
The Climb		Michael Angelo Covino	United States
Heroes Don't Die	Les héros ne meurent jamais	Aude Léa Rapin	France, Belgium, Bosnia and Herzegovina
Litigante		Franco Lolli	Spain, Colombia
Marighella		Wagner Moura	Brazil
Maternal		Maura Delpero	Italy, Argentina
The Unknown Saint		Alaa Eddine Aljem	Morocco, France, Qatar
Verdict		Raymund Ribay Gutierrez	Philippines, France
Vivarium		Lorcan Finnegan	United States

=== Documania ===
English title	Original title	Director(s)	Production countrie(s)
A Dog Called Money		Seamus Murphy	Ireland, United Kingdom
Blow It to Bits	On va tout péter	Lech Kowalski	France
Making Waves: The Art of Cinematic Sound		Midge Costin	United States
The Men's Room	For vi er gutta	Petter Sommer, Jo Vemund Svendsen	Norway
Paradise Without People		Francesca Trianni	United States
Red Penguins		Gabe Polsky	United States, Germany, Russia

=== Documentary Competition ===
English title	Original title	Director(s)	Production countrie(s)
Charismatic Megafauna		Jesper Kurlandsky, Fredrik Wenzel	Sweden
Just Don't Think I'll Scream	Ne croyez surtout pas que je hurle	Frank Beauvais	France
The Kingmaker		Lauren Greenfield	United States, Denmark
Midnight Family		Luke Lorentzen	United States, Mexico
Midnight Traveler		Hassan Fazili	United States, Qatar, United Kingdom, Canada
One Child Nation	Born in China	Nanfu Wang, Jialing Zhang	United States
Sea of Shadows		Richard Ladkani, Sean Bogle	Austria
Shooting the Mafia		Kim Longinotto	Ireland
State Funeral		Sergei Loznitsa	Netherlands, Lithuania
Talking About Trees		Suhaib Gasmelbari	France, Sudan, Chad, Germany, Qatar

=== Icons ===
English title	Original title	Director(s)	Production countrie(s)
After the Wedding		Bart Freundlich	United States
The Bare Necessity	Perdrix	Erwan Le Duc	France
The Best Years of a Life	Les plus belles années d'une vie	Claude Lelouch	France
Ema		Pablo Larraín	Chile
Honey Boy		Alma Har'el	United States
Judy and Punch		Mirrah Foulkes	Australia
Knives Out		Rian Johnson	United States
La Belle Époque		Nicolas Bedos	France
Ordinary Love		Lisa Barros D'Sa, Glenn Leyburn	United Kingdom
Portrait of a Lady on Fire	Portrait de la jeune fille en feu	Céline Sciamma	France
The Report		Scott Z. Burns	United States
Seberg		Benedict Andrews	United States, United Kingdom
The Specials	Hors normes	Éric Toledano and Olivier Nakache	France
The Traitor	Il traditore	Marco Bellocchio	Italy, France, Brazil, Germany

=== Impact ===
English title	Original title	Director(s)	Production countrie(s)
Atlantics	Atlantique	Mati Diop	France, Senegal, Belgium
Beanpole	Dylda	Kantemir Balagov	Russia
The Farewell		Lulu Wang	United States
Just 6.5	Metri Shesh-o Nim	Saeed Roustayi	Iran
Matthias & Maxime	Matthias et Maxime	Xavier Dolan	Canada
The Souvenir		Joanna Hogg	United Kingdom, United States
Tremors	Temblores	Jayro Bustamante	Guatemala, France

=== Open Zone ===
English title	Original title	Director(s)	Production countrie(s)
About Endlessness	Om det oändliga	Roy Andersson	Sweden, Germany, Norway
By the Grace of God	Grâce à Dieu	François Ozon	France, Belgium
A Girl Missing	Yokogao	Kōji Fukada	Japan, France
The Girl with a Bracelet	La Fille au bracelet	Stéphane Demoustier	France, Belgium
I Was at Home, But	Ich war zuhause, aber	Angela Schanelec	Germany, Serbia
Jojo Rabbit		Taika Waititi	United States, Germany
La Llorona		Jayro Bustamante	Guatemala, France
Liberté		Albert Serra	France, Portugal, Spain
Marriage Story		Noah Baumbach	United States, United Kingdom
Moffie		Oliver Hermanus	South Africa, United Kingdom
Nina Wu	Juo ren mi mi	Midi Z	Taiwan
Parasite	Gisaengchung	Bong Joon-ho	South Korea
Photograph		Ritesh Batra	Germany, India
Piranhas	La paranza dei bambini	Claudio Giovannesi	Italy
Rounds		Stephan Komandarev	Bulgaria, Serbia
This Is Not Berlin	Esto no es Berlín	Hari Sama	Mexico
Those Who Remained	Akik maradtak	Barnabás Tóth	Hungary
Vitalina Varela		Pedro Costa	Portugal
While at War	Mientras dure la guerra	Alejandro Amenábar	Spain, Argentina
The Whistlers	La Gomera	Corneliu Porumboiu	Romania, France, Germany

== Awards ==
The following awards were presented during the 30th edition:

- Best Film (Bronze Horse): Song Without a Name by Melina León
- Best Director: Mark Jenkin for Bait
- Best First Film: You Deserve a Lover by Hafsia Herzi
- Best Script: Synonyms by Nadav Lapid and Haim Lapid
- Best Actress: Nina Hoss for The Audition
- Best Actor: Bartosz Bielenia for Corpus Christi
- Best Cinematography: Inti Briones for Song Without a Name
- Best Documentary: One Child Nation by Nanfu Wang and Jialing Zhang
- Best Short Film: Kingdom Come by Sean Robert Dunn
- FIPRESCI Award: By the Grace of God by François Ozon
- Rising Star: Celie Sparre
- Impact Award: Kantemir Balagov for Beanpole

=== Lifetime Achievement Award ===
- Max von Sydow

=== Achievement Award ===
- Payman Maadi

=== Visionary Award ===
- Céline Sciamma
