= Alicia Rodríguez =

Alicia Rodríguez may refer to:

- Alicia Rodríguez (FALN) (born 1953), Puerto Rican member of the FALN
- Alicia Rodríguez (Chilean actress) (born 1992)
- Alicia Rodríguez (Spanish actress) (born 1935)
