= Rodrigo Teixeira (producer) =

American film producer

- Teixeira in 2026
- Born: Rodrigo Abreu Teixeira; 2 December 1976 (age 49); Rio de Janeiro, Brazil
- Occupation: Producer
- Years active: 2004–present

Rodrigo Abreu Teixeira (born 2 December 1975) is a Brazilian film producer. Through his RT Features production company, he produced numerous acclaimed feature films, in Hollywood and Brazil, including: Frances Ha (2012), The Witch (2015), Mistress America (2015), Call Me by Your Name (2017), The Lighthouse (2019), The Invisible Life of Eurídice Gusmão (2019), Ad Astra (2019), Bergman Island (2021), Armageddon Time (2022) and I'm Still Here (2024).

In 2024, Teixeira was nominated for the Academy Award for Best Picture for producing I'm Still Here.

== Early life ==
Teixeira was born in Rio de Janeiro, Brazil. He began his career in the 1990s by acquiring book copyrights.

== Career ==
In 2005, Teixeira launched RT Features, a production company focusing on producing and financing films. Its first feature film was the dark comedy Drained (O Cheiro do Ralo), directed by Heitor Dhalia.

Frances Ha (2012), directed by Noah Baumbach, was his first international success as producer. Teixeira re-teamed with Baumbach on Mistress America (2015).

In 2017, Teixeira produced Call Me by Your Name directed by Luca Guadagnino, which earned four nominations at the 90th Academy Awards, with Texieira winning the Gotham Independent Film Award for Best Feature and receiving a nomination for Independent Spirit Award for Best Film.

Teixeira partnership with Martin Scorsese's Sikelia Productions to produce and finance films by emerging filmmakers, financed and produced numerous international productions including: Port Authority directed by Danielle Lessovitz and Murina directed by Antoneta Alamat Kusijanović.

He is also known for his longstanding partnership with James Gray, producing: Ad Astra (2019), Armageddon Time (2022) and Paper Tiger (2026).

In 2024, Teixeira produced I'm Still Here directed by Walter Salles, earning him a nomination for Academy Award for Best Picture.

== Filmography ==
=== As producer ===
| Year | English Title | Original Title | Director(s) | Notes |
|---|---|---|---|---|
| 2007 | Drained | O Cheiro do Ralo | Heitor Dhalia | |
| 2009 | Natimorto | | Paulo Machline | |
| 2009 | B1 | | Felipe Braga and Eduardo Hunter Moura | Documentary |
| 2011 | The Silver Cliff | O Abismo Prateado | Karim Aïnouz | |
| 2011 | Heleno | Heleno: O Príncipe Maldito | José Henrique Fonseca | |
| 2012 | Frances Ha | | Noah Baumbach | |
| 2012 | The Gorilla | O Gorila | José Eduardo Belmonte | |
| 2013 | Night Moves | | Kelly Reichardt | |
| 2014 | When I Was Alive | Quando Eu Era Vivo | Marco Dutra | |
| 2014 | Alemão | | José Eduardo Belmonte | |
| 2014 | Tim Maia | | Mauro Lima | |
| 2015 | The Witch | | Robert Eggers | |
| 2015 | Mistress America | | Noah Baumbach | |
| 2015 | Love | | Gaspar Noé | |
| 2016 | Indignation | | James Schamus | |
| 2016 | The Human Surge | El auge del humano | Eduardo Williams | |
| 2016 | The Silence of the Sky | O Silêncio do Céu | Marco Dutra | |
| 2016 | The Eternal Son | O Filho Eterno | Paulo Machline | |
| 2017 | Call Me by Your Name | | Luca Guadagnino | |
| 2017 | Patti Cakes | | Geremy Jasper | |
| 2017 | A Ciambra | | Jonas Carpignano | |
| 2017 | Friendly Beast | O Animal Cordial | Gabriela Amaral | |
| 2017 | Severina | | Felipe Hirsch | |
| 2018 | Skate Kitchen | | Crystal Moselle | |
| 2018 | Too Late to Die Young | Tarde Para Morir Joven | Dominga Sotomayor | |
| 2018 | The Father's Shadow | A Sombra do Pai | Gabriela Amaral | |
| 2019 | Yes, God, Yes | | Karen Maine | |
| 2019 | Port Authority | | Danielle Lessovitz | |
| 2019 | The Lighthouse | | Robert Eggers | |
| 2019 | The Invisible Life of Eurídice Gusmão | A Vida Invisível de Eurídice Gusmão | Karim Aïnouz | |
| 2019 | Wasp Network | | Olivier Assayas | |
| 2019 | Ad Astra | | James Gray | |
| 2021 | Murina | | Antoneta Alamat Kusijanović | |
| 2021 | Bergman Island | | Mia Hansen-Løve | |
| 2021 | Wandering Heart | Errante corazón | Leonardo Brzezicki | |
| 2022 | Alemão 2 | | José Eduardo Belmonte | |
| 2022 | Armageddon Time | | James Gray | |
| 2022 | Welcome, Violeta! | Bem-Vinda, Violeta! | Fernando Fraiha | |
| 2022 | Meteoros | | Luis Carone | |
| 2024 | Drenched in Blood | Barba Ensopada de Sangue | Aly Muritiba | |
| 2024 | I'm Still Here | Ainda Estou Aqui | Walter Salles | |
| 2024 | Bury Your Dead | Enterre Seus Mortos | Marco Dutra | |
| 2025 | Kontinental '25 | | Radu Jude | |
| 2025 | O'Dessa | | Geremy Jasper | |
| 2025 | Dracula | | Radu Jude | |
| 2026 | Bowels of Hell | Privadas de Suas vidas | Gurcius Gewdner and Gustavo Vinagre | |
| 2026 | Isabel | | Gabe Klinger | |
| 2026 | Paper Tiger | | James Gray | |
| 2026 | La Perra | | Dominga Sotomayor | |
| 2026 | Glaxo | | Benjamín Naishtat | |
| 2026 | Furies | | Rami Kodeih | Post-production |
| TBA | Sweet Vengeance | | Brian De Palma | Pre-production |
| TBA | Love Diptych | | Radu Jude | Pre-production |
