= 2020 Stockholm International Film Festival =

- Location: Stockholm, Sweden
- Founded: 1990
- Awards: Bronze Horse (Berlin Alexanderplatz by Burhan Qurbani)
- No. of films: 75
- Festival date: 11–22 November 2020
- Website: stockholmfilmfestival.se/en

Stockholm International Film Festival
- 2021 2019

The 31st Stockholm International Film Festival took place on 11–22 November 2020 in Stockholm, Sweden.

German drama film Berlin Alexanderplatz won the Bronze Horse, most prestigious award.

== Official selections ==
=== Competition ===
English title	Original title	Director(s)	Production countrie(s)
Apples	Μήλα (Mila)	Christos Nikou	Greece, Poland, Slovenia
Berlin Alexanderplatz		Burhan Qurbani	Germany
Gaza mon amour		Tarzan and Arab Nasser	Palestine, France, Germany, Portugal, Qatar
Ghosts	Hayaletler	Azra Deniz Okyay	Turkey, France, Qatar
Identifying Features	Sin Señas Particulares	Fernanda Valadez	Mexico, Spain
The Man Who Sold His Skin		Kaouther Ben Hania	Tunisia, France, Germany, Belgium, Sweden
Memory House		João Paulo Miranda Maria	Brazil, France
Nine Days		Edson Oda	United States
Servants	Služobníci	Ivan Ostrochovský	Slovakia, Romania, Czech Republic, Ireland
The World to Come		Mona Fastvold	United States

=== American Independents ===
English title	Original title	Director(s)	Production countrie(s)
Black Bear		Lawrence Michael Levine	United States
Dinner in America		Adam Cartier Rehmeier	United States
The Last Shift		Andrew Cohn	United States
One Night in Miami...		Regina King	United States
One of These Days		Bastian Günther	United States, Germany

=== Discovery ===
English title	Original title	Director(s)	Production countrie(s)
The Best Is Yet to Come	不止不休 (Bu zhi bu xiu)	Jing Wang	China
No Hard Feelings	Wir	Faraz Shariat	Germany
Shorta		Frederik Louis Hviid, Anders Ølholm	Denmark
Spring Blossom	Seize printemps	Suzanne Lindon	France
Thou Shalt Not Hate	Non odiare	Mauro Mancini	Italy, Poland

=== Documentary Competition ===
English title	Original title	Director(s)	Production countrie(s)
76 Days		Hao Wu, Weixi Chen, anonymous	United States
Assassins		Ryan White	United States
The Dissident		Bryan Fogel	United States
Gunda		Victor Kossakovsky	Norway, United States
Helmut Newton: The Bad and the Beautiful		Gero von Boehm	Germany
The Mole Agent		Maite Alberdi	Chile
Stray		Elizabeth Lo	United States, Turkey, Hong Kong
The Truffle Hunters		Michael Dweck, Gregory Kershaw	Italy, United States, Greece
Vivos		Ai Weiwei	Germany, Mexico
Yung Lean: In My Head		Henrik Burman	Sweden

=== Icons ===
English title	Original title	Director(s)	Production countrie(s)
Falling		Viggo Mortensen	Canada, United Kingdom
The Glorias		Julie Taymor	United States
My Little Sister	Schwesterlein	Stéphanie Chuat, Véronique Reymond	Switzerland
Nomadland		Chloé Zhao	United States
Supernova		Harry Macqueen	United Kingdom

=== Impact ===
English title	Original title	Director(s)	Production countrie(s)
February	Février	Kamen Kalev	France, Bulgaria
I Am Greta		Nathan Grossman	Sweden
Milestone	Meel patthar	Ivan Ayr	India
New Order	Nuevo Orden	Michel Franco	Mexico, France
Nowhere Special		Uberto Pasolini	Italy, Romania, United Kingdom

=== Open Zone ===
English title	Original title	Director(s)	Production countrie(s)
Love Affair(s)	Les choses qu'on dit, les choses qu'on fait	Emmanuel Mouret	France
Persian Lessons		Vadim Perelman	Russia, Germany, Belarus
Pinocchio		Matteo Garrone	Italy, France, United Kingdom
Summer of 85	Été 85	François Ozon	France
Sun Children	Khorshid	Majid Majidi	Iran
The Ties	Lacci	Daniele Luchetti	Italy
The Wasteland	Dashte khamoush	Ahmad Bahrami	Iran
The Woman Who Ran	도망친 여자	Hong Sang-soo	South Korea

=== Twilight Zone ===
English title	Original title	Director(s)	Production countrie(s)
Bad Hair		Justin Simien	United States
The Intruder	El Prófugo	Natalia Meta	Argentina, Mexico
Relic		Natalie Erika James	Australia, United States
Run Hide Fight		Kyle Rankin	United States
Surge		Aneil Karia	United Kingdom

== Awards ==
The following awards were presented during the 31st edition:

- Best Film (Bronze Horse): Berlin Alexanderplatz by Burhan Qurbani
- Best Director: Fernanda Valadez for Identifying Features
- Best First Film: Identifying Features by Fernanda Valadez
- Best Actor: Welket Bungué for Berlin Alexanderplatz
- Best Actress: Katherine Waterston for The World to Come
- Best Script: The Man Who Sold His Skin by Kaouther Ben Hania
- Best Cinematography: Benjamín Echazarreta for Memory House
- Best Documentary: Gunda by Viktor Kossakovsky
- Best Short Film: The Name of the Son by Martina Matzkini
- FIPRESCI Award: The Woman Who Ran by Hong Sang-soo
- Zalando Rising Star Award: Lancelot Ncube
- Impact Award: Michel Franco for New Order

=== Lifetime Achievement Awards ===
- Martin Scorsese
- Isabella Rossellini

=== Achievement Award ===
- Viggo Mortensen

=== Visionary Award ===
- Matteo Garrone
