= Tony Manero =

Tony Manero may refer to:

- Tony Manero (golfer) (1905–1989), American golfer
- Tony Manero (film), 2008 Chilean film
- Anthony "Tony" Manero, character played by John Travolta in the films Saturday Night Fever and Staying Alive
