= Ida Luz Rodríguez =

Puerto Rican activist (born 1950)

Ida Luz Rodríguez (born July 7, 1950) is a Puerto Rican nationalist. She was previously a member of the Fuerzas Armadas de Liberación Nacional (FALN) and was sentenced to 75 years for charges that included seditious conspiracy. She was sentenced on February 18, 1981, and incarcerated in a U.S. federal prison. She was released early from prison after President Bill Clinton extended a clemency offer to her on September 7, 1999.

== Early years and personal life ==
Ida Luz was born on July 7, 1950, in Las Marías, Puerto Rico, in 1950. She studied at the Northeastern Illinois University, majoring in psychology and sociology. She participated in community struggles for jobs, housing, and education, and worked at a hospital in the Puerto Rican community that she states blatantly discriminated against the very community it served. She worked at the Puerto Rican High School and with the Committee to Free the Five Nationalists. She had a son named Damian.

== Seditious conspiracy ==
Ida Luz Rodríguez was arrested in 1980 and sentenced to 83 years in prison for seditious conspiracy and related charges. Her sister is Alicia Rodríguez. In prison, Ida finished her bachelor's degree and continued studying psychology, health and environmental questions. Had Clinton not offered clemency, her release date was scheduled for 2014.

Rodríguez and 11 others were arrested on April 4, 1980, in Evanston, Illinois. They had been linked to more than 100 bombings or attempted bombings since 1974 in their attempt to achieve independence for Puerto Rico. At their trial proceedings, all of the arrested declared their status as prisoners of war, and refused to participate in the proceedings. None of the bombings of which they were convicted resulted in deaths or injuries. Ida Luz Rodríguez was given a 75-year federal sentence for seditious conspiracy and other charges.

Among the other convicted Puerto Rican nationalists there were sentences of as long as 90 years in Federal prisons for offenses including sedition, possession of unregistered firearms, interstate transportation of a stolen vehicle, interference with interstate commerce by violence and interstate transportation of firearms with intent to commit a crime. None of those granted clemency were convicted in any of the actual bombings. Rather, they had been convicted on a variety of charges ranging from bomb making and conspiracy to armed robbery and firearms violations. They were all convicted for sedition, the act of attempting to overthrow the Government of the United States in Puerto Rico by force.

== Human rights violations ==
There were reports of human rights violations against the FALN prisoners. The prisoners were placed in prisons far from their families. Some were allegedly sexually assaulted by prison personnel or denied adequate medical attention or kept in isolated underground prison cells for no reason. Amnesty International and the House of Representatives' Subcommittee on Courts, Intellectual Property and the Administration of Justice both criticized the conditions. The conditions were found to be in violation of the U.N. Standard Minimum Rules for the Treatment of Prisoners. A federal judge also expressed concerns regarding FALN prisoners held at the Female High Security Unit, Lexington, Kentucky. In the case of Baraldini vs. Meese, the judge found that their exceptionally restrictive conditions of detention were not in response to any legitimate security threat, and were therefore "an exaggerated response" and in violation of the prisoners' First Amendment rights.

== Political prisoner ==
At the time of their arrests, Rodríguez and the others declared themselves to be combatants in an anti-colonial war against the United States to liberate Puerto Rico from U.S. domination and invoked prisoner of war status. They argued that the U.S. courts did not have jurisdiction to try them as criminals and petitioned for their cases to be handed over to an international court that would determine their status. The U.S. Government did not recognize their request.

United States President Bill Clinton would later state that the sentences passed on Rodríguez and the others were "out of proportion to the nationalists' offenses". Statistics showed the sentences were almost 20 times greater than sentences for similar offenses by the American population at large.

For many years, numerous national and international organizations criticized Rodríguez's incarceration categorizing it as political imprisonment. She was released from prison on September 10, 1999, after President Bill Clinton extended her clemency. Clinton cited Rev. Desmond Tutu and former President Jimmy Carter as having been influential on his decision to grant Rodríguez the clemency offer. Cases involving the early release of other Puerto Rican prisoners have also been categorized as cases of political prisoners, with some being more vocal than others.

In criticizing President Clinton's decision to release the Puerto Rican prisoners, the U.S. Senate Republican Policy Committee also categorized Rodríguez as a "Puerto Rican Nationalist", echoing a recent Newsweek article. In 2006, the United Nations called for the release of the remaining Puerto Rican political prisoners in United States prisons.

== See also ==
- Oscar López Rivera
- Carlos Alberto Torres
- Juan Enrique Segarra-Palmer
- Edwin Cortes
- Pedro Albizu Campos
- Oscar Collazo
- Lolita Lebrón
- Puerto Rican independence movement
