= Bonsai (2011 film) =

2011 film

- Film poster
- Directed by: Cristián Jiménez
- Written by: Cristián Jiménez; Alejandro Zambra
- Starring: Gabriela Arriagada
- Cinematography: Inti Briones
- Edited by: Soledad Salfate
- Release dates: 14 May 2011 (Cannes); 26 April 2012 (Chile)
- Running time: 96 minutes
- Country: Chile
- Language: Spanish

Bonsai (Spanish: Bonsái) is a 2011 Chilean drama film directed by Cristián Jiménez, based on the 2006 book of the same name by Alejandro Zambra. It premiered during the Un Certain Regard section at the 2011 Cannes Film Festival. The film was released in the United Kingdom on 30 March 2012 and in the United States on 11 May 2012.

== Cast ==
- Gabriela Arancibia as Bárbara
- Cristóbal Briceño as Hippie
- Nathalia Galgani as Emilia
- Trinidad González as Blanca
- Ingrid Isensee as Vecina
- Paola Lattus as Vendedora
- Hugo Medina as Gazmuri
- Diego Noguera as Julio
- Andrés Waas as Claudio

== See also ==
- Cinema of Chile
