= Thursday Till Sunday =

- Film poster
- Spanish: De jueves a domingo
- Directed by: Dominga Sotomayor Castillo
- Written by: Dominga Sotomayor Castillo
- Release date: January 2012 (Rotterdam)
- Running time: 96 minutes
- Countries: Chile, Netherlands
- Language: Spanish

Thursday Till Sunday (Spanish: De Jueves a Domingo) is a 2012 Chilean coming-of-age film directed by Dominga Sotomayor Castillo in her debut feature.

The film premiered at the 2012 International Film Festival Rotterdam. Later that year, it won the Grand Prix of the New Horizons Film Festival in Wrocław.

== Plot ==
The film is set during a family trip to the north of Chile over a long weekend. As the journey becomes increasingly challenging, conflicts emerge between the couple, while Lucía (played by Santi Ahumada) and her brother remain unaware that this will be their father's farewell and potentially the final family trip.

== Cast ==
- Francisco Pérez-Bannen
- Paola Giannini
- Santi Ahumada
- Emiliano Freifeld
