= Daniel Rojas Pachas =

Chilean writer

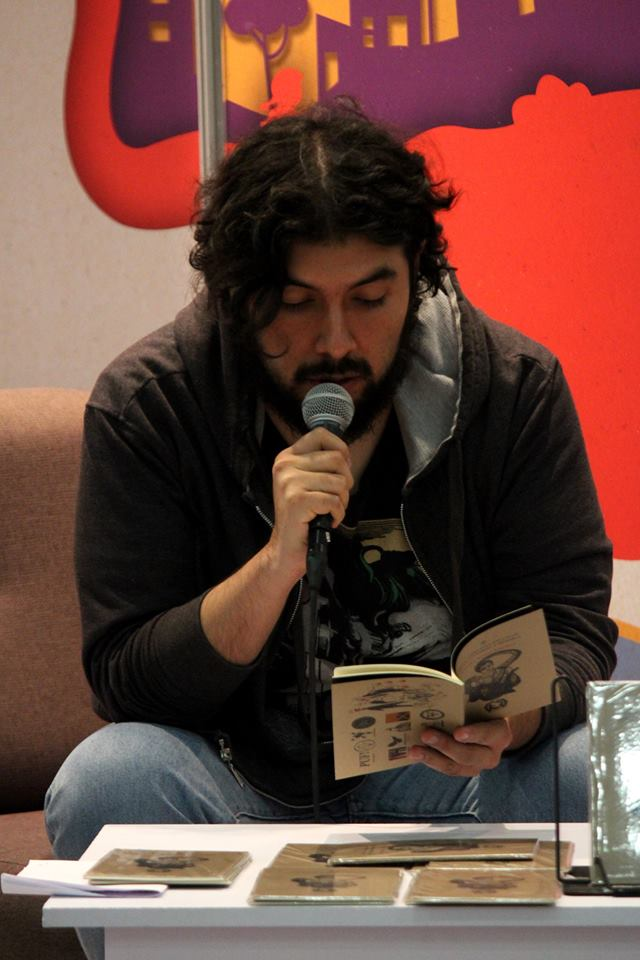
- Rojas Pachas at the FENAL 2018
- Born: March 15, 1983 (age 43); Lima, Perú
- Education: KU_Leuven University_of_Tarapacá
- Occupation: Writer
- Writing career
- Language: Spanish
- Notable works: Random (2014), Video killed the radio star (2016)

Daniel Francisco Rojas Pachas (born 1983) is a Chilean novelist, editor, poet, and academic. He currently lives and works in Belgium, where he is developing a research on the work of Enrique Lihn and Roberto Bolaño at KU Leuven university. Rojas Pachas is known for his novel Random and his academic work dedicated to Latin-American authors. His 2008 academic work Realidades Dialogantes examines the writing of Reinaldo Arenas, Roberto Bolaño, Ernesto Sabato, Guillermo Cabrera Infante and Miguel Ángel Asturias. In 2015 he was awarded the prize for Cultural Management of Arts and Heritage by the Chilean Ministry of Cultures and Arts and Heritage.

He studied literature at the University of Tarapacá on the northern border of Chile. In that region of Chile, he founded the publishing house Cinosargo and developed the transnational poetry festival Tea Party. In 2016, he moved to Mexico to study a postgraduate degree in Hispanic American Literature and developed a publishing activity that represented Chile in international spaces such as Helsinki in Finland, Italy, China, Switzerland, the Frankfurt International Book Fair, and the Guadalajara Book Fair.

In 2013, Pachas was anthologized along with Alejandro Zambra, Nona Fernández and Mike Wilson in the book CL textos de frontera from the Alberto Hurtado University. In 2014 it was part of the Chronicles book: "Ciudad Fritanga" together with authors such as Lina Meruane and Jorge Baradit. The reviewers stated: "The writer and editor Daniel Rojas Pachas (Cristo Barroco, Tea Party), who manages to hit the nail on the head with an experiential prose, dialogues with Arica. His poetry has been translated into Finnish, Portuguese, Bulgarian, Dutch and English. Extensive samples of his poems into English can be found in the San Diego Poetry Annual in the 2014, 2016, 2020, 2021, 2024 and 2025 editions.

In 2021 He was anthologized in a contemporary Latin American story book "Bajo la soledad del Neon" together with Guadalupe Nettel and Liliana Colanzi. In 2023 he presented at the International book fair of Guadalajara his essay dedicated to Manuel Scorza in the book Olafo y los amigos published in Mexico by the Cultural Institute of the Government of Guanajuato.

== Works ==
=== Novels ===
- Random (Narrativa Punto Aparte 2014, Chile) ISBN 978-956-9091-07-0
- Tremor (La Liga 2014, Chile) ISBN 978-956-9300-04-2
- Video Killed the Radio Star (Narrativa Punto Aparte 2016, Chile) ISBN 978-956-9091-18-6
- Rancor (Los Perros Románticos 2018, Chile) ISBN 978-956-9594-20-5

=== Academic monographs ===
- Realidades Dialogantes: Lectura de cinco autores latinoamericanos generacionales (Fondart 2008) ISBN 978-956-332-822-6
- El arte de la cháchara: la poética de lo abigarrado en las novelas de Enrique Lihn (Los Perros Románticos 2023, Chile) ISBN 978-956-9594-54-0

=== Poetry volumes ===
- Gramma (Cinosargo 2009) ISBN 978-956-332-823-3
- SOMA (Literal Ediciones 2012, México) ISBN 978-607-9088-26-2
- Allá fuera está ese lugar que le dio forma a mi habla (Navaja 2019, Chile) ISBN 978-956-09269-0-6
- Mecanismo destinado al simulacro (Municipalidad Metropolitana de Lima 2022)

=== Other works ===
- Carne (LUMA 2017, Zúrich - Curated by Hans Ulrich Obrist, Simon Castets, and Kenneth Goldsmith) ISBN 978-1-365-97699-5
- Cristo Barroco (Mago Editores 2017, Chile) ISBN 978-956-317-406-9
- Morgue y otros poemas: Translated by Daniel Rojas Pachas (Sauvage Atelier 2024, México) ISBN 978-607-59630-7-5
- Afval. Reflujo: Anthology of the delirious tale. Chile: Emergencia Narrativa, 2024 ISBN 978-956-8688-66-0
