= I Love Pinochet =

- Theatrical release poster
- Directed by: Marcela Said
- Written by: Marcela Said
- Cinematography: José Luis Arredondo; Óscar Urrutia; Marcela Said
- Edited by: Rubén Korenfeld
- Music by: J. P. Hourton; Philippe Boissire
- Production companies: Pathé doc Imago Comunicaciones
- Release date: 2001
- Running time: 52 minutes
- Country: Chile
- Language: Spanish

I Love Pinochet is a 2001 Chilean documentary film directed by Marcela Said, which shows the phenomenon of Pinochetism following the arrest of former dictator Augusto Pinochet in London.

Public figures openly supportive of the Pinochet regime appear in the documentary, such as Joaquín Lavín, Cristián Labbé, Raúl Hasbún, Patricia Maldonado, Francisco Javier Cuadra, Hermógenes Pérez de Arce, among others, in addition to showing anonymous Pinochetists from different social classes. The film attempts to reduce critical analyzes of Pinochetism to a minimum, which focus primarily on the opinion of the historian Alfredo Jocelyn-Holt and the director's own voiceover.

The documentary was shown on French, Swiss, Australian and English television. He participated in the film festivals of Biarritz and Valparaíso, in the latter he won the "Santiaguillo award" in September 2002.

== Awards ==
- Santiaguillo Award 2002 of the VI International Film Festival of Valparaíso
- Santiago International Documentary Festival
- Altazor Award 2003, documentary directing category
