= Ingrid Isensee =

Chilean actress

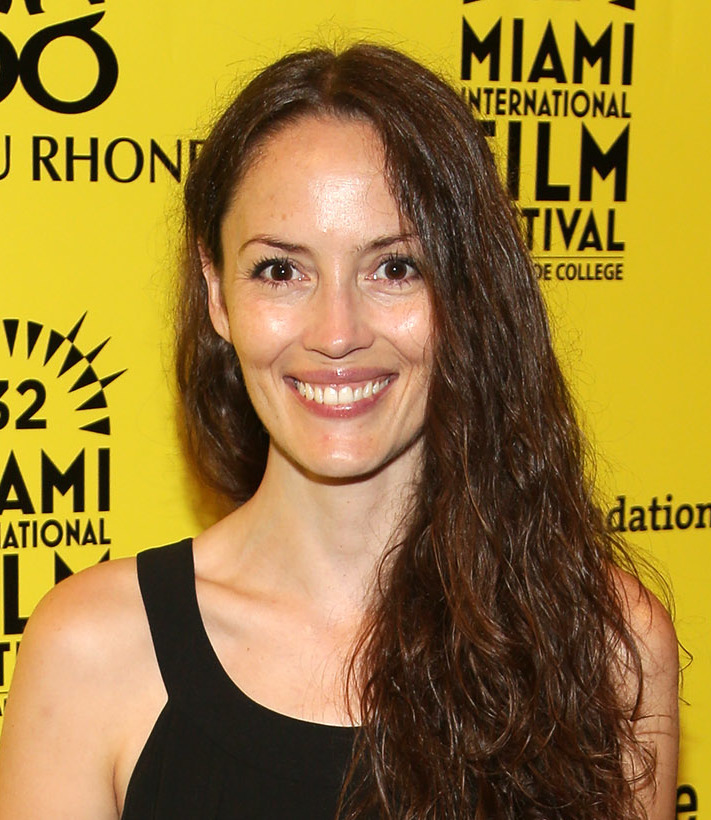
- Isensee in 2015
- Born: 31 December 1974 (age 51); Santiago, Chile
- Occupation: Actress
- Years active: 2004-present

Ingrid Isensee (born 31 December 1974) is a Chilean actress. She appeared in more than twenty films since 2004.

== Selected filmography ==
Year	Title	Role	Notes
1998	Takilleitor		
2011	Bonsai		
2012	Young and Wild		
2014	Voice Over		
2015	Sex Life of Plants	Olaya	
2022	Phantom Project	Antonia	
