= Outsider Girls =

Las demás
- Theatrical release poster
- Directed by: Alexandra Hyland
- Written by: Alexandra Hyland
- Produced by: Selva González; Roberto Doveris; Alexandra Hyland
- Starring: Nicole Sazo; Alicia Rodríguez
- Cinematography: Francisca Sáez Agurto
- Edited by: Mayra Morán; Roberto Doveris; Valeria Hernández
- Music by: Dadalú
- Production companies: Maltrato Films; Niña Niño Films
- Distributed by: Storyboard Media
- Release dates: January 30, 2023 (IFFR); January 11, 2024 (Chile)
- Running time: 80 minutes
- Country: Chile
- Language: Spanish

Outsider Girls (Spanish: Las demás, lit. 'The others') is a 2023 Chilean comedy-drama film written, co-produced and directed by Alexandra Hyland in her directorial debut. Starring Nicole Sazo and Alicia Rodríguez. It premiered on January 30, 2023, at the International Film Festival Rotterdam, the Netherlands.

== Synopsis ==
Gaby and Rafa are two university students whose oasis of pink tones is interrupted when Rafa becomes pregnant after a night of debauchery. Due to Chile's ultra-conservative society, abortion is illegal except in extreme cases. They both set out to earn enough to pay for expensive abortion pills through a series of odd part-time jobs, straining their friendship in the process.

== Cast ==
The actors participating in this film are:

- Nicole Sazo as Rafa
- Alicia Rodríguez as Gaby
- Alonso Quintero as Matías
- Geraldine Neary as Candi
- Gabriela Arancibia as Pao
- Paola Lattus as La Flaca
- Amalia Kassai as Mamá Namaste
- Eyal Meyer as Papá Mino
- Juan Cano as Carlos
- Pamela Barboza as Pame
- Claudia Canales as Clau
- María Paz Grandjean as Cuqui
- Sebastián Ayala as Doctor
- Armin Felmer as Juanito
- Koke Santa Ana as Mirón
- Jaime Omeñaca as Dueño Local
- Alexa Soto as Tamara
- Sofía Sepúlveda as Florencia

== Release ==
It had its world premiere on January 30, 2023, at the International Film Festival Rotterdam. It was commercially released on January 11, 2024, in Chilean theaters.

== Accolades ==
| Year | Award | Category | Recipient | Result | Ref. |
|---|---|---|---|---|---|
| 2023 | Buenos Aires International Festival of Independent Cinema | Best Film in Official International Competition | Alexandra Hyland | Nominated | |
| 2023 | Buenos Aires International Festival of Independent Cinema | Best Director of Photography in Feature Film in Official International Competition | Francisca Saez Agurto | Won | |
| 2023 | Santiago International Film Festival | International Competition - Best Performance | Nicole Sazo | Won | |
| 2025 | 9th Caleuche Awards | Best Leading Actress | Nicole Sazo | Nominated | |
