= La Perra =

2026 drama film

- Directed by: Dominga Sotomayor
- Written by: Inés Bortagaray
- Based on: La perra by Pilar Quintana
- Produced by: Rodrigo Teixeira; Fernando Bascuñán; Berta Marchiori
- Starring: Manuela Oyarzún; David Gaete; Selton Mello; Paula Luchsinger; Paula Dinamarca; Rafaella Grimberg
- Cinematography: Simone D’Arcangelo
- Edited by: Federico Rotstein
- Music by: Clint Mansell
- Production companies: RT Features; Planta
- Release date: 18 May 2026 (Cannes)
- Running time: 112 minutes
- Countries: Brazil; Chile
- Language: Spanish

La Perra is a 2026 drama film directed by Dominga Sotomayor, written by Inés Bortagaray and based upon the novel of the same name by Pilar Quintana. It stars Manuela Oyarzún, David Gaete, Selton Mello, Paula Luchsinger, Paula Dinamarca and Rafaella Grimberg.

The film had its world premiere at the Directors' Fortnight section of the 2026 Cannes Film Festival on 18 May, where it won the Palm Dog Award for its title character.

== Premise ==
A woman finds an abandoned puppy and through bonding she seeks to heal from her past.

== Cast ==
- Manuela Oyarzún as Silvia
- David Gaete as Mario
- Selton Mello as Duda
- Paula Luchsinger as Alba
- Paula Dinamarca as Ximena
- Rafaella Grimberg as young Silvia

== Production ==
In September 2025, it was announced Selton Mello had joined the cast of the film, with Dominga Sotomayor directing a screenplay from Inés Bortagaray.

== Release ==
The film had its world premiere at the 2026 Cannes Film Festival in the Directors' Fortnight section, on 18 May.
