= Phantom Project =

Proyecto fantasma
- Theatrical release poster
- Directed by: Roberto Doveris
- Written by: Roberto Doveris
- Produced by: Roberto Doveris; Aura Sinclair
- Starring: Juan Cano; Ingrid Isensee; Violeta Castillo; Fernanda Toledo; Fernando Castillo; Yasmín Ludueñas; Natalia Grez; Rocío Monasterio; Claudio González Ravanal; Marco Carmona; Conrado Soto; Constanza Fernández; Sofía Oportot; Paloma Larraín; Tomás Abalo
- Cinematography: Patricio Alfaro
- Edited by: Sylvana Squiciarini
- Music by: Cristian Reinas
- Production companies: Agencia Rekia; Niña Niño Films
- Distributed by: BZ Films
- Release dates: January 26, 2022 (Rotterdam); May 18, 2023 (Chile)
- Running time: 97 minutes
- Country: Chile
- Language: Spanish

Phantom Project (Spanish: Proyecto fantasma) is a 2022 Chilean fantasy comedy-drama film written and directed by Roberto Doveris. It had its international premiere on January 26, 2022, as part of the Official Selection at the 51st International Film Festival Rotterdam where it competed for the Tiger Award. Starring Juan Cano, Ingrid Isensee, Violeta Castillo, Fernanda Toledo, Fernando Castillo, Yasmín Ludueñas, Natalia Grez, Rocío Monasterio, Claudio González Ravanal, Marco Carmona, Conrado Soto, Constanza Fernández, Sofía Oportot, Paloma Larraín and Tomás Abalo.

== Synopsis ==
Pablo is a young actor whose dream is to star in a feature film. To make ends meet, he works as a simulated patient, participating in alternative therapy sessions. His life is going downhill, he has just ended a relationship and his roommate disappears, leaving him with debts and endless problems... including a ghost. This will be the beginning of his journey through the Ñuñoa neighborhood, meeting his neighbors, making new friends and discovering that the path to fulfill his dream will be more tangled and complicated than it seems.

== Cast ==
The actors participating in this film are:

- Juan Cano as Pablo
- Ingrid Isensee as Antonia
- Violeta Castillo as Sofia
- Fernanda Toledo as Kathy
- Fernando Castillo as Francisco Moraga
- Yasmín Ludueñas as Camila
- Natalia Grez as Ana
- Rocío Monasterio
- Constanza Fernández
- Sofía Oportot
- Paloma Larraín
- Tomás Abalo
- Claudio González Ravanal
- Marco Carmona
- Conrado Soto

== Release ==
The film had its international premiere on January 26, 2022, as part of the Official Selection at the 51st International Film Festival Rotterdam. It was commercially released on May 18, 2023 in Chilean theaters.

== Reception ==
=== Critical reception ===
On the review aggregator website Rotten Tomatoes, 90% of 10 critics' reviews are positive, with an average rating of 6.6/10.

Cara-Lynn Branch of Universal Cinema wrote: "Phantom Project is an example of modern queer cinema. Early on, you get the sense this is queer cinema made by a queer filmmaker." Diego Brodersen of Página 12 wrote: "At its best, Phantom Project depicts a character at a crossroads in life, when adulthood has no turning back and the possibilities for the future begin to dwindle. Ergo, the anguish, that meetings with friends and friends and the possibility of new boyfriends fail to appease. In other instances, the indie comedy tone approaches the land of the sitcom, although without completely losing the tenderness."

=== Accolades ===
| Year | Award | Category | Recipient | Result | Ref. |
|---|---|---|---|---|---|
| 2022 | Buenos Aires International Festival of Independent Cinema | Best Actor | Juan Cano | Won | |
| 2022 | Buenos Aires International Festival of Independent Cinema | Best Film | Phantom Project | Nominated | |
| 2022 | IndieLisboa International Independent Film Festival | Grand Prize City of Lisbon - International Competition | Phantom Project | Nominated | |
| 2022 | Rotterdam International Film Festival | Tiger Award | Phantom Project | Nominated | |
| 2022 | Seattle International Film Festival | Ibero American Competition | Phantom Project | Nominated | |
| 2022 | Valdivia International Film Festival | Best Film | Phantom Project | Nominated | |
