= Young & Wild (2012 film) =

2012 film by Marialy Rivas

- Theatrical release poster
- Spanish: Joven y alocada
- Directed by: Marialy Rivas
- Written by: Marialy Rivas; Camila Gutiérrez; Pedro Peirano; Sebastián Sepúlveda; María José Viera-Gallo
- Produced by: Juan de Dios Larraín; Pablo Larraín
- Starring: Alicia Luz Rodríguez; Aline Küppenheim; María Gracia Omegna; Felipe Pinto; Alejandro Goic; Ingrid Isensee
- Cinematography: Sergio Armstrong
- Edited by: Andrea Chignoli; Sebastián Sepúlveda
- Music by: Francisca Valenzuela; Javiera Mena
- Production company: Fabula
- Distributed by: BF Distribution
- Release dates: 21 January 2012 (Sundance); 29 March 2012 (Chile)
- Running time: 95 minutes
- Country: Chile
- Language: Spanish
- Box office: $212,624

Young & Wild (Spanish: Joven y alocada) is a 2012 Chilean coming-of-age comedy-drama film directed by Marialy Rivas and co-written by Marialy Rivas, Camila Gutiérrez, María José Viera-Gallo and Pedro Peirano. Starring Alicia Rodríguez and Maria Gracia Omegna, the film tells the story of Daniela, a 17-year-old bisexual girl who writes a blog about the conflicts she experiences between her evangelical Protestant, conservative family and her sexuality. The film premiered at the 2012 Sundance Film Festival where it was awarded the World Cinema Screenwriting Award.

== Plot ==
Daniela is a 17-year-old girl who resides in Santiago, Chile. Despite her family's devout Protestant beliefs, she eagerly explores her sexuality through both casual sex and a blog titled "Young and Wild". The blog serves as a platform where she questions her church's teachings and documents her sexual adventures, including her first experiences with masturbation, oral sex, and anal sex. As her blog gains popularity, it attracts comments from people ranging from supportive to gossipy, and even some who outright proposition her for sex.

Following an incident where she is caught having sex with another student, Daniela is expelled from her conservative Christian school. Her mother initially does not react to the news. Daniela later learns that her beloved aunt, a bohemian and a role model for her, has been hospitalized due to cancer. While at the hospital, Daniela's aunt pleads with her mother not to send Daniela to perform grueling missionary work. As a result, Daniela takes a job as a gofer at a local Christian television station, where she meets her coworkers Tomás and Antonia.

Daniela finds herself immediately drawn to Tomás and begins to fantasize about him. The two start dating, but Tomás refuses to engage in premarital sexual activity. Sexually frustrated, Daniela tries to seduce him and has some degree of success. After complaining to Antonia, she is invited to a party where she briefly performs oral sex on Tomás until he stops her. As she leaves the party, Daniela whispers to Antonia that she had intended to have sex with both Tomás and her. Soon afterwards, Daniela begins a bisexual affair with Antonia that Daniela documents on her blog.

Daniela's parents come to trust Tomás, allowing him to spend unsupervised time with her. However, Tomás' reservations finally break down when Daniela questions his level of interest in her. The two eventually have sex, and Daniela writes on her blog about feeling torn between Antonia and Tomás, both of whom she is regularly sexually involved with. Antonia expresses displeasure with their clandestine relationship, but Daniela is unwilling to commit to only one partner. During a family dinner at a restaurant, thieves suddenly storm in, but the family's prayers cause the robbers to pass them by. This incident causes Daniela to begin questioning both her spirituality and morals.

Daniela stuns both her blog readers and family when she declares her desire to be baptized. Her family is overjoyed, and her aunt arranges a baptism at a lake, the same location where her aunt had been baptized. However, Tomás discovers Daniela's blog and learns about her infidelity. Furious, he ends their relationship, while Antonia does too. Her mother angrily rebukes Daniela and hits her for her behavior. Shortly thereafter, her aunt dies, leaving Daniela with many unanswered questions, ranging from spirituality to relationships. She is not permitted to attend the funeral by her family, watching it off from the side. Daniela concludes the film with a voice-over quote from Paul the Apostle, stating that she now feels lost.

== Cast ==
- Alicia Luz Rodríguez as Daniela
- Aline Küppenheim as Daniela's mother
- María Gracia Omegna as Antonia
- Felipe Pinto as Tomás
- Alejandro Goic as Raimundo
- Ingrid Isensee as Isabel
- Tomás de Pablo as Cristóbal Ramírez
- Pablo Krögh as Josué
- Hernán Lacalle as Pastor Simón
- Andrea García-Huidobro as Julia
- Camila Hirane as Barbage (la tigresa de occidente)
- Luis Gnecco as interviewee
- Catalina Saavedra as converted woman
- Javiera Mena as herself

== Critical reception ==
Critics had mixed reactions to the film. Nicolas Rapold of The New York Times was unimpressed by Alicia Rodríguez' lead performance and the "insistently blanched" cinematography. On the other hand, other critics praised the portrayal of unwanted emotional conflicts emerging beyond physical relationships. Erik Childress of eFilmCritic writes: "This is a film that respects sex and the emotional consequences that follow once the heat wears off." Todd McCarthy of The Hollywood Reporter said about the film that "the ferocious effort of conservative religions to keep a tight lid on pre-marital sex is as old as history, but seeing it played out in a South American context gives it a new twist, at least onscreen."

== Awards ==
Year	Nominee / work	Award	Result
2012	Alicia Rodríguez	Colón de Plata award for Best Actress, Huelva Latin American Film Festival	Won
2012	Marialy Rivas	Sebastiane Award, San Sebastián International Film Festival	Won
2012	Marialy Rivas	Horizons Award, San Sebastián International Film Festival	Nominated
2012	Camila Gutiérrez, Marially Rivas, Pedro Peirano, Sebastián Sepúlveda	World Cinema Screenwriting Award, Sundance Film Festival	Won
2012	Marialy Rivas	Grand Jury Prize, World Cinema – Dramatic, Sundance Film Festival	Nominated

== See also ==
- List of LGBT-related films directed by women
- Cinema of Chile
