= Multiple Choice (novel) =

2014 Chilean novel by Alejandro Zambra

- The cover to the novel
- Author: Alejandro Zambra
- Translator: Megan McDowell
- Publisher: Penguin Books
- Publication date: 2016
- Publication place: Chile

Multiple Choice (Spanish: Facsímil, lit. 'Facsimile') is a novel published by the Chilean author Alejandro Zambra in 2014. Megan McDowell's English translation was published by Penguin Books in 2016. The novel uses the structure and questions of the Chilean Academic Aptitude Test as its organizing principle. Called both a work of parody and poetry, Multiple Choice examines the role of the education system and standardized testing in promoting compliance to authoritarian rule.
