= Sebastián Sepúlveda =

- Born: 1972 (age 53–54); Concepción, Chile
- Education: La Fémis, Escuela Internacional de Cine y Televisión
- Occupations: Film director, screenwriter, film producer, film editor

Sebastián Sepúlveda (born 1972) is a Chilean screenwriter, film producer, editor and director.

== Life and career ==
Sepúlveda was born in Concepción, Chile. He lived the first 18 years of his life between Europe and South America due to his family's exile from Chile during the military regime. On return to Santiago in 1990, he began studying history. Towards the end of the 1990s Sepúlveda studied at two prestigious film schools, La Fémis in Paris (screenwriting) and Escuela Internacional de Cine y Televisión, San Antonio de los Baños, Cuba (editing) and began creating his first short films.

He was involved in editing and writing a number of films in the 2000s, including Young and Wild (2012).

Sepúlveda's directorial debut was the documentary O Areal (The Sandpit), about the Guajará community in Brazil's Amazon rainforest.

Sepúlveda received funding from Fonds Sud cinema (managed by France's Institut Français) to create his next film as director, The Quispe Girls. The film was based on the true story of the Quispe sisters who died in mysterious circumstances in 1974 and stars Catalina Saavedra as well as Digna Quispe, the niece of one of the Quispe sisters. The Quispe Girls won the audience's award at the FILMAR Festival of Latin American film and also screened at the Venice Film Festival.

== Filmography ==
=== Director ===
- The Quispe Girls, 2013
- O Areal (The Sandpit), documentary, 2008

=== Screenwriter ===
- The Quispe Girls, 2013
- Young and Wild, 2012
- Grado 3, 2009
- Maria y el Nuevo Mundo, documentary, 2009
- O Areal (The Sandpit), documentary, 2008

=== Editor ===
- The Blue Trail (O Último Azul), 2025, It will have its world premiere in February 2025, as part of the 75th Berlin International Film Festival, in Competition.
- Spencer, 2021
- Lisey's Story (series), 2021
- Ema (film), 2019
- Chicuarotes, 2019
- Jackie (2016)
- El Club, 2015
- Young and Wild, 2012
- Ulysses, 2011
- The Year of the Tiger, 2011
- Maria y el Nuevo Mundo, documentary, 2009
- O Areal (The Sandpit), documentary, 2008
- The crime of Zacarias Barrientos, documentary, 2008
- La León, 2007
- Ralco, documentary, 1999
- Sensibile Short, 1998

=== Producer ===
- O Areal (The Sandpit), documentary, 2008
- Jo jo jo, short, 1996

== See also ==
- Cinema of Chile
- Latin American cinema
- Cinema of the world
- World cinema
