= The Summer of Flying Fish =

- film poster
- El verano de los peces voladores
- Directed by: Marcela Said
- Written by: Julio Rojas and Marcela Said
- Produced by: Bruno Bettati and Tom Dercourt
- Starring: Gregory Cohen; Francisca Walker; María Izquierdo; Emilia Lara
- Cinematography: Inti Briones
- Edited by: Jean de Certeau
- Release date: 20 May 2013 (Cannes)
- Countries: Chile, France
- Language: Spanish

The Summer of Flying Fish (Spanish: El Verano de los Peces Voladores) is a 2013 Chilean-French comedy-drama film directed by Marcela Said. It stars Gregory Cohen, Francisca Walker, María Izquierdo, Roberto Cayuqueo, and Bastián Bodenhöfer.

The film premiered in the Directors' Fortnight section at the 2013 Cannes Film Festival.

== Plot ==
Manena is on vacation in southern Chile with her father Francisco, a wealthy landowner and avid hunter. Francisco is obsessed with eradicating the carp that have invaded his aquaculture ponds, resorting to increasingly extreme measures—including the use of explosives. Manena appears to be the only one who senses the growing tension that her father's actions are causing within the local Mapuche community, who assert ancestral rights to the land.

== Cast ==
- Gregory Cohen – Francisco
- Francisca Walker – Manena
- María Izquierdo – Teresa
- Roberto Cayuqueo – Pedro
- Bastián Bodenhöfer – Carlos
- Guillermo Lorca – Lorca
- Paola Lattus – Ester
- Emilia Lara – Isidora
- Enrique Soto – Nacho

== Reception ==
As Said's first feature film following a background in documentary filmmaking, The Summer of Flying Fish received a mixed critical response after its screening at the 2013 Cannes Film Festival. Although praised for its suspenseful atmosphere and evocative tone, the film was also criticized for a weak narrative structure, underdeveloped characters, and unclear motivations.

According to Variety critic Peter Debruge, the film blends scripted drama with documentary techniques, using non-professional actors and naturalistic settings to depict tensions between white landowners and the Indigenous Mapuche. Debruge describes the film as a subtle, politically conscious hybrid that relies on subtext rather than exposition, though he notes it may have limited commercial appeal due to its understated narrative and style.

== See also ==
- Cinema of Chile
