= Optical Illusions (film) =

- Theatrical release poster
- Directed by: Cristián Jiménez
- Written by: Cristián Jiménez and Alicia Scherson
- Cinematography: Inti Briones
- Music by: Cristóbal Briceño
- Release date: 2009
- Running time: 105 minutes
- Countries: Chile, France, Portugal
- Language: Spanish

Optical Illusions (Spanish: Ilusiones ópticas) is a 2009 comedy-drama film directed by Cristián Jiménez (in his directorial debut) and written by Jiménez & Alicia Scherson.

== Plot ==
The film tells three interwoven stories with irony and black humor. They include a mall security guard who falls in love with an elegant thief, an efficient office worker sent to a training workshop for the unemployed by his company, and a blind skier who regains his sight and becomes suddenly terrified of the city. These three men are immersed in circumstances and desires that they don't fully comprehend.

== Cast ==
- Ivan Alvarez de Araya
- Gregory Cohen
- Eduardo Paxeco
- Paola Lattus
- Álvaro Rudolphy
- Valentina Vargas
