= The Quispe Girls =

- Film poster
- Spanish: Las niñas Quispe
- Directed by: Sebastian Sepulveda
- Written by: Sebastian Sepulveda
- Based on: Las brutas by Juan Radrigán
- Produced by: Juan de Dios Larrain
- Starring: Digna Quispe, Catalina Saavedra, Francisca Gavilán, Alfredo Castro, Segundo Araya
- Cinematography: Inti Briones
- Edited by: Santiago Otheguy
- Production company: Fábula
- Distributed by: Fábula, Swipe Films
- Release date: August 30, 2013 (Venice)
- Running time: 83 minutes
- Country: Chile
- Language: Spanish

The Quispe Girls (Spanish: Las niñas Quispe) is a 2013 Chilean film written and directed by Sebastián Sepúlveda. It is based on the true story of the Quispe sisters and on Juan Radrigán's play Las brutas.

== Plot ==
The film depicts the tragic story of Justa, Lucía, and Luciana Quispe, three sisters who worked as goat-herders in the Chilean altiplano located in the Atacama desert region, the ancestral home of the indigenous Colla people.

In 1974, the sisters were worried that their animals were losing their economic value due to the growing rumors about the military government that had reached even the remotest areas of the country. Already affected by the loss of one of their sisters, they were further frightened by the news that the military had reached the nearby town of Copiapó. Tragically, Justa, Lucía, and Luciana committed suicide by hanging themselves from a rock, along with their two dogs.

== Cast ==
- Catalina Saavedra as Lucía Quispe
- Francisca Gavilán as Luciana Quispe
- Digna Quispe (the Quispe sisters' niece) as Justa Quispe
- Segundo Araya as Don Juan
- Alfredo Castro as Fernando

== Shooting ==
The filmmakers chose to shoot the suicide scene on the same rock where the real incident took place, and Justa Quispe's role was played by her niece, Digna Quispe. Director and screenwriter Sebastián Sepúlveda recalled his initial meeting with Digna, "I was very afraid of Digna when I first met her. She doesn't shake hands, she just shakes fingers in a very cold way," but later Digna agreed to participate in the project. Digna's personality was believed to reflect her life in the Altiplano, and it left an indelible mark on the film.

== Awards ==
- Venice Film Festival Critics' Week, best cinematography.
- Lima Film Festival Critics' Award, and best cinematography.
- Festival Filmar, Switzerland Best Film.
- Lakino Film Festival Best Film.
- Mar del Plata International Film Festival Mention Best Film.
- CINEMATROPICAL AWARDS 2015. Best First Film. Nominated Best Film, Best Director.

== Reception ==
- The film had a positive reception, though some criticized the awkwardness of integrating the inexperienced Digna Quispe with the rest of the crew. Digna, though brilliant, was illiterate and had no acting experience, with one reviewer saying her performance did not blend with those of Francisca Gavilán and Catalina Saavedra, the other two main characters.
- The Hollywood Reporter also gave a positive review, saying: "Sebastian Sepulveda's beautifully written, played and shot feature debut is as dark, pure and bleak as the lives of its subjects."
