= Alejandro Zambra =

Chilean poet and writer (born 1975)

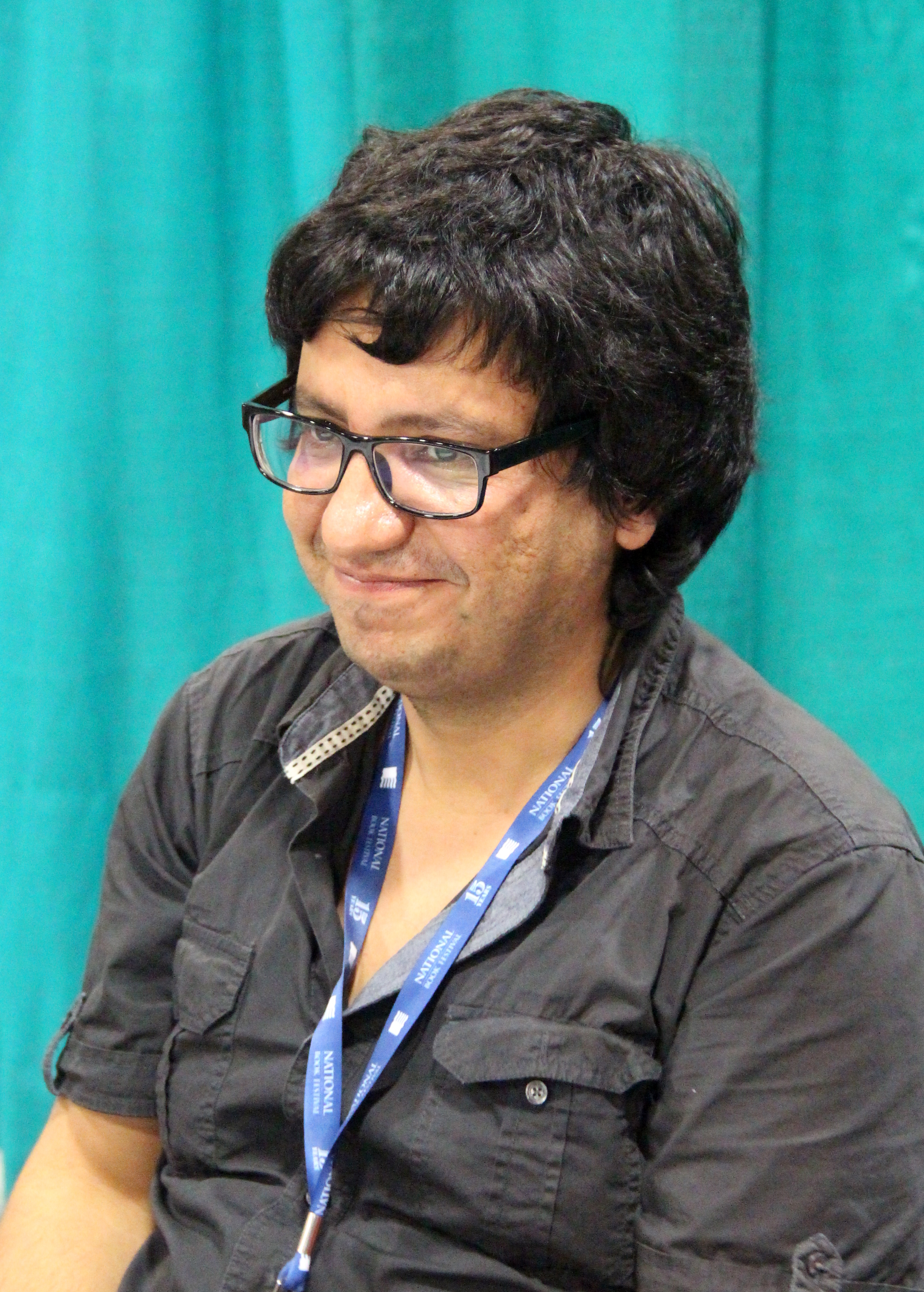
- Zambra at the 2015 National Book Festival
- Born: September 24, 1975 (age 51); Santiago, Chile
- Education: University of Chile; Pontifical Catholic University (PhD)
- Occupation: Writer
- Spouse: Jazmina Barrera
- Children: 2
- Writing career
- Language: Spanish
- Notable works: Bonsái (2006), Formas de volver a casa (2011)
- Notable awards: Altazor Award, Prince Claus Awards

Alejandro Andrés Zambra Infantas (Santiago, Chile, born September 24, 1975) is a Chilean poet, short-story writer and novelist. He has been recognized for his talent as a young Latin American writer, chosen in 2007 as one of the "Bogotá39" (the best Latin American writers under the age of 39) and in 2010 by Granta as one of the best Spanish-language writers under the age of 35.

== Early life and education ==
Alejandro Zambra was raised in 1975 in aipú, a suburb of Santiago, during the dictatorship of Augusto Pinochet. In a magazine interview with his close friend from his Master's program, Zambra explains his thoughts on growing up in Chile during the 1970s and 1980s. Growing up in such a time, Zambra considers himself and his generation, "children of the dictatorship". He later describes how his life changed after Pinochet's end of power, "The nineties were a time of smudging out. The dictatorship tried to impose all of those stupid discourses, and those discourses erased us."

Zambra studied at the Instituto Nacional General José Miguel Carrera and the University of Chile, from which he graduated in 1997 with a degree in Hispanic literature. He won a scholarship to pursue postgraduate studies in Madrid, where he obtained an MA in Hispanic studies. Back in Chile, he received a PhD in literature from the Pontifical Catholic University.

== Career ==
Zambra describes the beginning of his writing career by saying: "I wouldn't choose to be a writer. Actually I don't think I ever chose it, I was just undeniably worse at other things." Zambra began with writing poetry, citing influences such as Nicanor Parra, Jorge Teillier, Gonzalo Millán, and Enrique Lihn, and his brief novels are noted for their poetic natures. He is often noted for his successful use of metafiction, or writing about writing, in his novels. Short stories and articles by Zambra have been featured in magazines such as The New Yorker, The Paris Review, McSweeney's Quarterly Concern, Babelia, and Quimera. Zambra also has worked as a literary critic for the newspaper La Tercera and as a professor at the School of Literature at Diego Portales University in Santiago.

He is married to Mexican writer Jazmina Barrera, with whom he has a son.

=== Bonsái ===
Zambra's first novel, Bonsái, attracted much attention in Chile and appeared in the Spanish Editorial Anagrama, which was awarded the Chilean Critics Award for best novel of the year in 2006. As the highly influential Santiago newspaper El Mercurio summed up, "The publication of Bonsai ... marked a kind of bloodletting in Chilean literature. It was said (or argued) that it represented the end of an era, or the beginning of another, in the nation's letters." Bonsái was eventually translated into several languages, such as English at Melville Publishing House by Carolina Robertis. Just five years later, the book was turned into a film of the same name directed by Christían Jiménez, and presented at the Cannes Film Festival in 2011.

=== The Private Lives of Trees ===
In this second novel, a writer tells his stepdaughter a bedtime story called "The Private Lives of Trees" (the same title as the novel), which he plans to end when the mother returns home from work. This novel appears to be somewhat autobiographical, as the man in the story also has finished a book about bonsai trees, referencing Zambra's previous successful novel Bonsái.

=== Ways of Going Home ===
His 2013 novel Ways of Going Home is fictional but draws heavily on Zambra's childhood experience under the Pinochet dictatorship. The novel switches between the memory of a nine-year-old boy growing up during a restrictive dictatorship and the life of the narrator who is writing the story, an example of meta-writing, or writing about writing. "This small novel contains a surprising vastness, created by its structure of alternating chapters of fiction and reality," Adam Thirlwell writes in The New York Times. "Almost every miniature event or conversation is subject to a process of revision, until you realize that Zambra is staging not just a single story of life under political repression, but the conditions for telling any story at all."

== Bibliography ==
=== Poetry ===
- 1998 - Bahía Inútil, poems 1996–1998, Santiago: Ediciones Stratis, ISBN 978-956-288-147-0
- 2003 - Mudanza, Santiago, Quid Ediciones.

=== Novels ===
- 2006 - Bonsái, Barcelona, Anagrama.
  - Bonsai. Translated by Carolina De Robertis. Melville House Publishing, 2008.
  - Bonsai : a novel. Translated by Megan McDowell. Penguin Books, 2022.
- 2007 - La vida privada de los árboles, Barcelona: Anagrama.
  - The Private Lives of Trees. Translated by Megan McDowell. Open Letter Books, 2010.
- 2011 - Formas de volver a casa, Barcelona: Anagrama.
  - Ways of Going Home. Translated by Megan McDowell. Farrar, Straus and Giroux, 2013.
- 2014 - Facsímil, Santiago: Hueders; Buenos Aires: Eterna Cadencia (2015); Madrid:, Sexto Piso (2015).
  - Multiple Choice. Translated by Megan McDowell. Penguin Books, 2016.
- 2020 - Poeta chileno, Barcelona: Anagrama.
  - Chilean Poet. Translated by Megan McDowell. Viking Books, 2022.

=== Short fiction ===
Collections

- 2013 - Mis documentos (Barcelona: Anagrama)
  - My documents. Translated by Megan McDowell. McSweeney's, 2015.

Stories (Note: Short stories unless otherwise noted.)

- Fantasía (with illustrations by Javiera Hiault-Echeverría; bilingual Spanish-English edition) Santiago: Ediciones Metales pesados, 2016 ISBN 978-956-9843-12-9
- El 34 (.CL Frontera, 2013) Anthology that includes authors such as Ramón Díaz Eterovic, Nona Fernández, Daniel Rojas Pachas y Elicura Chihuailaf, Santiago: Ediciones Universidad Alberto Hurtado ISBN 978-956-8421-74-8

Title	Year	First published	Reprinted/collected	Notes
Skyscrapers	2022	Zambra, Alejandro (August 22, 2022). "Skyscrapers". The New Yorker. 98 (25): 54–59.		Translated from the Spanish by Megan McDowell

=== Criticism and essays ===
- 2010 - No leer, compilation of critiques, Barcelona, Alpha Decay, 2012.
  - Not to read. Translated by Megan McDowell. London: Fitzcarraldo Editions. 2018.
- 2019 - Tema libre, compilation of short stories, essays, and chronicles, Barcelona, Anagrama.

=== Critical studies and reviews of Zambra's work ===
Not to read

- Martin, Andrew (March 7–20, 2019). "A more personal Chile". The New York Review of Books. 66 (4): 8–11.

———————

Bibliography notes

== Film adaptions ==
- Bonsái, 2017
- Family Life, 2011

== Awards ==
- 2005: Literature-art award III for the poem Directions in collaboration with Sachiyo Nishimura
- 2007: Critic of Chile Award for Bonsái (best novel of 2006)
- 2007: National Council of Reading and Books Award for Bonsái (best novel of 2006)
- 2007: Finalist for Altazor Prize for Bonsái
- 2008: Finalist for Best Translated Book of the year for Bonsái
- 2010: Best Young Spanish-Language Novelists as chosen by Granta
- 2010: Finalist for Prix du Marais for The Private Lives of Trees
- 2012: Altazor prize for Ways of Going Home (best narrative of 2011)
- 2012: Nominated for an International IMPAC Dublin Literary Award for The Private Lives of Trees
- 2012: Finalist for The Americas Award for Ways of Going Home
- 2012: Finalist Medici Prize for Ways of Going Home (Secondary Persons)
- 2012: National Council of Reading and Books Award for Ways of Going Home
- 2013: Prince Claus Award
- 2014: Miniciple Literature of Santiago Prize- general story for My Documents
- 2014: Finalist for Hispanic-American Prize for Gabriel García Márquez story
- 2015–2016: Cullman Center fellow at the New York Public Library
