= Marialy Rivas =

Chilean screenwriter and film director

Marialy Rivas is a Chilean screenwriter and film director, best known for her 2012 film Young and Wild, which won the World Cinema Screenwriting Award at the Sundance Film Festival. She was raised in Chile during the military dictatorship of Augusto Pinochet. Rivas is openly lesbian and has discussed the challenges of being open about her sexuality in Chile, where she noted that it is often considered impolite to publicly acknowledge being gay, even when it is widely known.

== Career ==
She studied in the School of Cinema of Chile, but withdrew in the third year. In 1996 she directed the short film Desde siempre, winner of the Santiago Short Film Festival, and was reviewed by the magazine Cahiers du cinéma. Rivas says that she knew she wanted to be a director since she was seven. During her childhood, Rivas was not allowed to watch television so she went to the cinema three times a week and cites this as an influence in her decision to become a director.

In 2000, she directed the short film Smog, along with Sebastián Lelio.

In 2010, she directed Blokes, selected in the Short Film Palme d'Or competition of the Cannes Film Festival. It also got awards in the Lleida Latin-American Film Festival, and other 50 film festivals. His first feature film Young and Wild, was premièred on 21 January 2012 in the Sundance Film Festival, where it won the World Cinema Screenwriting Award, Drama. In May 2012 she obtained the Sundance's Directors and Screenwriters Lab award.

In 2017, Rivas released her second feature film, Princesita which premiered at the Toronto International Film Festival and won Film of the Festival at Raindance Film Festival.

== Filmography ==
Rivas’ first short film was Desde Siempre (1996) a documentary film about homosexuality in Chile during the 90s. At the time in Chile, the gay experience was unknown and censored from society and the film ended up resonating with people more than expected. Rivas would ask anyone to participate in the interviews and ended up using friends or friends of friends. Rivas says on the process of making the film that she would write down the interviews and pick the angle that interested her, generating one-minute texts based on their words but emphasizing the angle she was interested in for each character. During filming, she would give these texts to the interviewers and have them act in these fictional situations.

Smog (2000)

Blokes (2010)

Young & Wild (2012) was Rivas’ first feature film, she was inspired to make the film from a blog that she stumbled upon. The blog was a mix of blunt sexual tales and tender evangelical stories of the writer's youth and her church. Rivas reached out to the writer of these blog and did some interviews with her, eventually going back to Pedro Peirano to help structure the film's story. Later, she went on to write the script, showing it to Gutiérrez, the writer of the blog, to do all the dialogue and voiceover.

Princesita (2017) is Rivas’ second feature film and is about Tamara, a 12-year-old in a cult that its leader believes her to be the chosen one. Again, like Rivas’ previous work, the inspiration for the story was based on a news article from 2012 about a girl forced into carrying a baby by her grandfather who was part of a cult in Chile. In casting the role of the main character, Rivas went to schools and cast kids with the consent of the parents which is how she found Sara Caballero. Influences for the film's style and look, Rivas looked to the work of Sally Mann and Bill Henson. Saying about Mann's work “...I used to have her pictures as a teenager pasted on my walls and then these images came back to me because all her work are her shots of her own children in idyllic places and they are all naked. Of course, there were no weird intentions or views, but the images still have something disturbing, there is something strange about this beauty."

== Awards and nominations ==
Movie	Year	Nomination(s)	Award(s)	Festival(s)
Desde Siempre	1996		Winner	Santiago Short Film Festival
Blockes	2010	Palme d'Or		Cannes Film Festival
Young & Wild	2012		The World Cinema Screenwriting Award	Sundance
Princesita	2017		Film of the Festival, Best International Feature, Best Cinematography and Best Performance	Raindance Film Festival

== See also ==
- List of female film and television directors
- List of lesbian filmmakers
- List of LGBT-related films directed by women
