= Alicia Rodríguez (Chilean actress) =

Chilean actress

- Born: 21 May 1992 (age 34); Santiago, Chile
- Occupation: Actress
- Years active: 2009–present

Alicia Rodríguez (born 21 May 1992) is a Chilean actress. She is best known for her performance as Daniela Ramírez in Young and Wild.

== Selected filmography ==
Film
| Year | Title | Role |
|---|---|---|
| 2023 | Outsider Girls | Gaby |
| 2012 | Young and Wild | Daniela |
| 2011 | Old Cats | Valentina |
| 2010 | The Life of Fish | Daniela |

Television
| Year | Title | Role |
|---|---|---|
| 2015 | La poseída | Vitalia Mackenna |

== Awards ==
- 2012 Huelva Ibero-American Film Festival || Colón de Plata: Best Actress for Young and Wild
