= Alicia Rodríguez (FALN) =

Puerto Rican activist (born 1953)

Alicia Rodríguez (born 1953, Chicago) is a Puerto Rican member of the FALN who received a sentence of 55 years for seditious conspiracy and other charges. She was sentenced on February 18, 1981, and incarcerated in a U.S. federal prison. However, she was released early from prison, after President Bill Clinton extended a clemency offer to her on September 7, 1999.

== Early years and personal life ==
Rodríguez was born in Chicago in 1953, the first in her family to be born in the United States. She recalled beginning school not knowing English and teachers not knowing how to work with children who did not speak English. A teacher sat her in the back of the classroom and paid little attention to her or her learning needs.

In high school, Alicia became senior class president. Alicia ditched class to attend her older sister's college classes. This is where she began to take an interest in political science classes that discussed the wars in Algeria and Vietnam.

Her first trip to Puerto Rico, which came only after graduating from high school, was a turning point in her life. On her third and last trip, as a biology student at the University of Illinois at Chicago, Alicia was heartbroken to see the devastating effects of industrial pollution on the island and resolved to combat the root of the problem - colonialism.

== Seditious conspiracy ==
Rodríguez was arrested in 1980, convicted of seditious conspiracy and related charges, and sentenced to 55 years in prison. Her sister is Ida Luz Rodriguez. Although Rodriguez was one of the longest-held prisoners in the prison, with an immaculate record which included the accumulation of a bachelor's degree with honors, after 13 years she was still not permitted to walk unescorted across the grounds.

Rodríguez and 11 others were arrested on April 4, 1980, in Evanston, Illinois. They had been linked to more than 100 bombings or attempted bombings since 1974 in their attempt to achieve independence for Puerto Rico. At their trial proceedings, all of the arrested declared their status as prisoners of war, and refused to participate in the proceedings.

None of the bombings of which they were convicted resulted in deaths or injuries. Rodriguez was given a 55-year federal sentence for seditious conspiracy and other charges. Among the other convicted Puerto Rican nationalists there were sentences of as long as 90 years in Federal prisons for offenses including sedition, possession of unregistered firearms, interstate transportation of a stolen vehicle, interference with interstate commerce by violence and interstate transportation of firearms with intent to commit a crime. None of those granted clemency were convicted in any of the actual bombings. Rather, they had been convicted on a variety of charges ranging from bomb making and conspiracy to armed robbery and firearms violations. They were all convicted for sedition, the act of attempting to overthrow the Government of the United States in Puerto Rico by force.

== Human rights violations ==
There were reports of human rights violations against the FALN prisoners. The prisoners were placed in prisons far from their families, some were sexually assaulted by prison personnel, some were denied adequate medical attention, and others were kept in isolated underground prison cells for no reason. Amnesty International and the House of Representatives' Subcommittee on Courts, Intellectual Property and the Administration of Justice both criticized the conditions. The conditions were found to be in violation of the U.N. Standard Minimum Rules for the Treatment of Prisoners. A federal judge also expressed concerns regarding FALN prisoners held at the Female High Security Unit, Lexington, Kentucky. In the case of Baraldini vs. Meese, the judge found that their exceptionally restrictive conditions of detention were not in response to any legitimate security threat, and were therefore "an exaggerated response" and in violation of the prisoners' First Amendment rights.

== Prisoner ==
At the time of their arrest Rodriguez and the others declared themselves to be combatants in an anti-colonial war against the United States to liberate Puerto Rico from U.S. domination and invoked prisoner of war status. They argued that the U.S. courts did not have jurisdiction to try them as criminals and petitioned for their cases to be handed over to an international court that would determine their status. The U.S. Government, however, did not recognize their request.

The sentences received by Rodriguez and the other Nationalists were judged to be "out of proportion to the nationalists' offenses" President Clinton said though a spokesman.

For many years, numerous national and international organizations criticized Rodriguez' incarceration categorizing it as political imprisonment. Alicia Rodriguez was finally released from prison on September 10, 1999, after President Bill Clinton extended her clemency. Clinton cited Rev. Desmond Tutu and former President Jimmy Carter as having been influential on his decision to grant Rodriguez the clemency offer. Cases involving the release of other Puerto Rican Nationalist prisoners have also been categorized as cases of political prisoners, with some being more vocal than others.

In criticizing President Clinton's decision to release the Puerto Rican prisoners, the conservative U.S. Senate Republican Policy Committee also categorized Rodriguez as a "Puerto Rican Nationalist", echoing a recent Newsweek article. In 2006, the United Nations called for the release of the remaining Puerto Rican political prisoners in United States prisons.

== Life after prison ==
Alicia Rodriguez moved to Puerto Rico after being released. Alicia and her sister Ida Luz Rodriguez are attempting to lead a quiet life after spending 20 years in prison.

== See also ==
- Oscar López Rivera
- Carlos Alberto Torres
- Juan Enrique Segarra-Palmer
- Edwin Cortes
- Pedro Albizu Campos
- Oscar Collazo
- Lolita Lebrón
- Puerto Rican independence movement
