= Memory House =

2020 film

- Film poster
- Portuguese: Casa de Antiguidades
- Directed by: João Paulo Miranda Maria
- Written by: João Paulo Miranda Maria
- Produced by: Denise Gomes; Paula Cosenza; Didar Domehri
- Starring: Antônio Pitanga; Ana Flávia Cavalcanti; Sam Louwyck
- Cinematography: Benjamín Echazarreta
- Edited by: Benjamin Mirguet
- Music by: Nicolas Becker
- Release date: 19 November 2020
- Running time: 93 minutes
- Countries: Brazil; France
- Languages: Portuguese; German

Memory House (Portuguese: Casa de Antiguidades) is a 2020 drama film directed by João Paulo Miranda Maria. The film was part of the selection of the 2020 Toronto International Film Festival.

The film was named as an Official Selection of the 2020 Cannes Film Festival, although it was not able to screen at Cannes due to the cancellation of the festival in light of the COVID-19 pandemic in France.

The film won the Roger Ebert Award at the 2020 Chicago International Film Festival.
