= Information Sciences University =

University Ucinf
- Universidad Ucinf
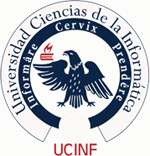
- Type: Private University
- Established: July 14, 1989
- Location: Santiago de Chile, Chile; 33°25′43″S 70°36′37″W
- Campus: Rectorado: Avenida Pedro de Valdivia #450, Providencia, Chile
- Website: www.ucinf.cl

University Ucinf was a Chilean private university specializing in informatics. The UCINF had 7 faculties and 3 Technological Institutes dedicated to the teaching of technical careers.

The UCINF was recognized as the 48th Chilean university according to the classification of the Superior Council of Scientific Research or CSIC, in July 2011, and 25th according to the ranking of El Mercurio.

== Faculties and school ==
The Main Campus was inaugurated in October 2007

- Faculty of Engineering and Businesses
- Faculty of Legal, Political and Social Sciences
- Faculty of Education
- Faculty of Architecture and Arts
