= Too Late to Die Young (film) =

- Film poster
- Directed by: Dominga Sotomayor Castillo
- Written by: Dominga Sotomayor Castillo
- Cinematography: Inti Briones
- Release date: 2 August 2018 (Locarno Film Festival)
- Running time: 110 minutes
- Country: Chile
- Language: Spanish
- Box office: $14,084

Too Late to Die Young (Spanish: Tarde para morir joven) is a 2018 Chilean drama film directed by Dominga Sotomayor Castillo. She became the first woman ever to win the Leopard for Best Direction at the Locarno Festival.

== Plot ==
This coming-of-age tale takes place around the New Year's Eve period of 1990 in Chile, in the intentional rural community of Comunidad Ecológica de Peñalolén, located in the precordillera of Santiago. The story follows a teenage girl named Sofía (played by Demian Hernández) as she navigates adolescence.

== Cast ==
- Demian Hernández
- Antar Machado
- Magdalena Tótoro
- Matías Oviedo
- Andrés Aliaga
- Antonia Zegers
- Alejandro Goic
- Eyal Meyer
- Mercedes Mujica
- Gabriel Cañas
- Michael Silva
- Paola Lattus

== Reception ==
The film has a 98% approval rating on review aggregator Rotten Tomatoes based on 55 reviews, with an average rating of 7.6/10. The site's critics' consensus reads: "Too Late to Die Young uses one family's experiences as the foundation for a dreamily absorbing drama with a poignant, lingering warmth." On Metacritic the film holds an 80 out of 100 average score based on 15 reviews, indicating "generally favorable reviews".
