= Voice Over (film) =

2014 film

- Chilean theatrical release poster
- Directed by: Cristián Jiménez
- Written by: Cristián Jiménez
- Starring: Ingrid Isensee
- Release dates: 6 September 2014 (TIFF); 12 November 2015 (Chile)
- Running time: 96 minutes
- Country: Chile
- Language: Spanish

Voice Over (Spanish: La voz en off) is a 2014 Chilean drama film directed by Cristián Jiménez. It was selected to be screened in the Contemporary World Cinema section at the 2014 Toronto International Film Festival.

== Plot ==
Sofía is a 35-year-old woman living in Valdivia, Chile. She has two children and has just gone through a separation. Her breakup is compounded by the frustration of not being able to work and dedicate herself to her profession, acting. Additionally, she and her sister Ana face the dilemma of uncovering the mystery of their father after he leaves home and abandons their mother.

== Cast ==
- Ingrid Isensee as Sofia
- María José Siebald as Ana
- Paulina García as Matilde
- Niels Schneider as Antoine
- Maite Neira as Alicia
- Cristián Campos as Manuel
- Lucas Miranda as Roman
