= Tony Manero (film) =

2008 film by Pablo Larraín

- Cannes film poster
- Directed by: Pablo Larraín
- Written by: Alfredo Castro; Mateo Iribarren; Pablo Larraín
- Cinematography: Sergio Armstrong
- Edited by: Andrea Chignoli
- Music by: Juan Cristóbal Meza
- Production companies: Fábula; Prodigital
- Release dates: 17 May 2008 (Cannes); 28 August 2008 (Chile)
- Running time: 97 minutes
- Country: Chile
- Language: Spanish

Tony Manero is a 2008 Chilean drama film directed by Pablo Larraín about a 52-year-old man in Santiago in 1978 who is obsessed with John Travolta's character in Saturday Night Fever. It won the top prize at the 2008 Torino Film Festival and was Chile's submission to the 81st Academy Awards for the Academy Award for Best Foreign Language Film. In 2009 it won the Golden Tulip at the Istanbul International Film Festival.

== Plot ==
This film follows a man in his fifties who is obsessed with the character Tony Manero, portrayed by John Travolta in the movie Saturday Night Fever. He dedicates himself to imitating Manero's mannerisms and elaborate dance moves.

Set in Santiago, Chile during the military dictatorship of Augusto Pinochet, filmmaker Pablo Larraín makes a deliberate effort to depict the decadence, violence, and darkness of the era.

Raúl Peralta is the main character of the film, a man of simple speech whose primary concern is faithfully embodying his idol, Tony Manero. He lives in a run-down boarding house that has a small stage used for rehearsing dance routines, including the main choreography from the American movie.

The film begins with Peralta attempting to participate in a contest on a popular television program called Festival de la Una. Each week the program seeks "the double of" a particular celebrity, and this time they are looking for the double of Tony Manero.

Peralta's efforts to emulate his idol and win the contest unfold through a bifocal lens, which shows both the character's lack of scruples and the harsh reality of his environment.

== Cast ==
- Alfredo Castro – Raúl Peralta
- Paola Lattus – Pauli
- Héctor Morales – Goyo
- Amparo Noguera – Cony
- Elsa Poblete – Wilma
- Marcelo Alonso – Rumano
- Maité Fernández – María
- Antonia Zegers – Productora TV
- Marcial Tagle – Vidrero
- Rodrigo Pérez – Agente CNI 1
- Pancho González – Agente CNI 2
- Luis Uribe – Enrique
- Greta Nilsson – Cajera
- Enrique Maluenda – TV host

== Reception ==
The film holds an 84% approval rating from the review aggregator website Rotten Tomatoes, based on 38 reviews. The website's consensus reads, "Deliberately provocative, Tony Manero is as challenging and compelling as it is difficult to describe."

== DVD releases ==
The film has been released on DVD in several countries. Region 2 DVDs were released in 2009 by Network in the U.K. and Ripley's Home Video in Italy, and an unrated region 1 DVD was released in 2010 by Kino International.

== See also ==
- List of submissions to the 81st Academy Awards for Best Foreign Language Film
- Cinema of Chile
