= Marcela Said =

Chilean film director and screenwriter (born 1972)

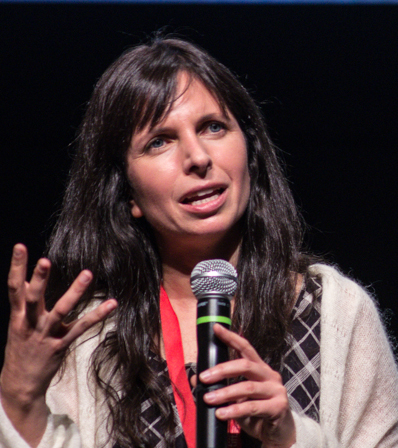
- Said at the Toronto International Film Festival in 2013
- Born: 26 March 1972 (age 54); Santiago, Chile
- Citizenship: Chilean; French
- Occupations: Film director, screenwriter.
- Years active: 1999–present
- Spouse: Jean de Certeau
- Children: 1

Marcela Paz Said Cares (born 26 March 1972) is a Franco-Chilean director and screenwriter.

== Life and career ==
Marcela Said obtained a degree in aesthetics from the Pontifical Catholic University of Chile. In 1997, Said moved to France, studying film and media at the Paris-Sorbonne University.

In 1999, Said's first documentary, Valparaíso, premiered, produced by Les Films d’Ici. Two years later she directed the documentary I Love Pinochet, which focused on supporters of the late dictator Augusto Pinochet. The film won awards at the Valparaíso Film Festival and the Santiago International Documentary Festival (FIDOCS), and received an Altazor Award.

In 2006, Said directed a third documentary, Opus Dei, una cruzada silenciosa (Opus Dei, A Silent Crusade) alongside Jean de Certeau. The film looked at the influence of Opus Dei in Chile. Her next film, The Young Butler (El Mocito in Spanish), focuses on the story of Jorgelino Vergara, a man who worked in a torture centre during the Chilean military regime. This documentary was also directed together with Jean de Certeau and it premiered at Forum, Berlinale 2011. The Young Butler also received an Altazor Award in the category of best documentary.,

In 2013, Said's film The Summer of Flying Fish premiered in the Directors' Fortnight at the 2013 Cannes Film Festival. The fictional film tells the story of young Manena, on vacation in the south of Chile, and explores the Mapuche conflict and Mapuche culture in Chile.

== Selected filmography ==
- Valparaíso (1999)
- I Love Pinochet (2001)
- Opus Dei, una cruzada silenciosa (2006)
- El mocito (2011)
- El verano de los peces voladores (2013)
- Los Perros (2017)
- Narcos: Mexico (2020)
- Lupin (2021) (director of 2 episodes)
- Gangs of London (2022)
- Blade Runner 2099 (2026)
