= Song Without a Name =

2019 film

- Film poster
- Spanish: Canción sin nombre
- Directed by: Melina León
- Written by: Melina León; Michael J. White
- Starring: Pamela Mendoza; Tommy Párraga; Lidia Quipse; Lucio Rojas; Maykol Hernández
- Cinematography: Inti Briones
- Edited by: Melina León; Manuel Bauer; Antolín Prieto
- Music by: Pauchi Sasaki
- Production company: La Vida Misma Films
- Distributed by: Sophie Dulac Distribution
- Release dates: 16 May 2019 (Cannes); 2 October 2020 (Peru)
- Running time: 97 minutes
- Countries: Peru; Spain; Switzerland; United States
- Languages: Spanish; Quechua

Song Without a Name (Spanish: Canción sin nombre) is a 2019 drama film directed by Melina León. It was screened in the Directors' Fortnight section at the 2019 Cannes Film Festival. It was selected as the Peruvian entry for the Best International Feature Film at the 93rd Academy Awards, but it was not nominated. It is a co-production between Peru, Spain, Switzerland and the United States.

== Plot ==
A mother takes her newborn baby to a health clinic, but the baby and clinic both disappear.

== Cast ==
- Pamela Mendoza
- Tommy Párraga
- Lidia Quipse
- Lucio Rojas
- Maykol Hernández

== See also ==
- List of submissions to the 93rd Academy Awards for Best International Feature Film
- List of Peruvian submissions for the Academy Award for Best International Feature Film
