= Melina León (director) =

Peruvian filmmaker (born 1977)

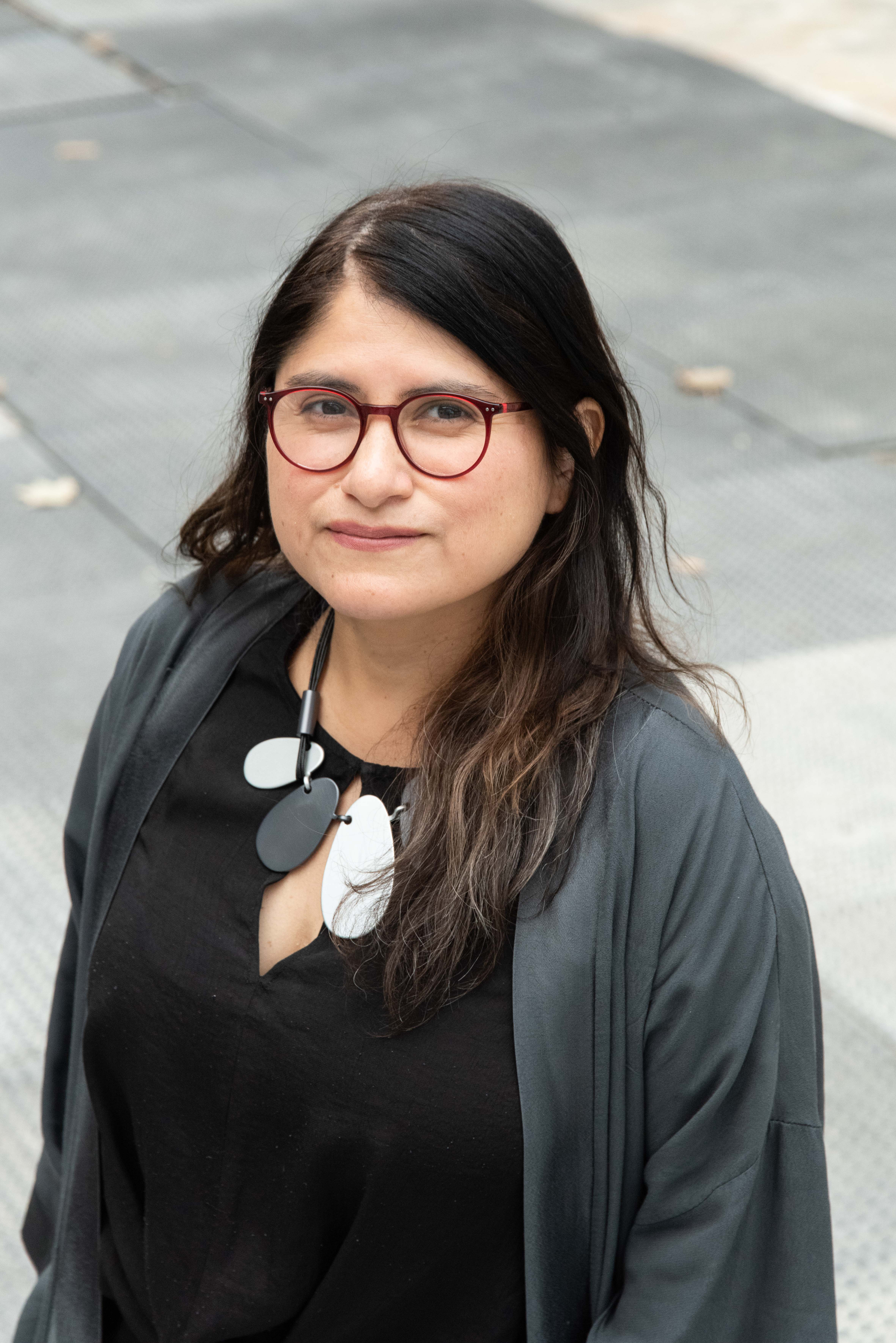
- León in 2022
- Born: 1977 (age 47–48); Lima, Peru
- Occupation(s): Film director, screenwriter
- Years active: 2000-present

Melina León (Spanish: [meli.na leˈon]; born 1977) is a Peruvian filmmaker.

== Early life and education ==
Melina León was born in Lima in 1977, to Ismael León Arias, a renowned journalist and one of the founders of the newspaper La República, who helped expose a child trafficking network that illegally sent children abroad in the 1980s.

She studied communications at the University of Lima and completed a master's degree in Film Directing at Columbia University, which she was able to finish thanks to a three-year scholarship funded by the Hollywood Foreign Press Association (HFPA).

== Career ==
León directed her first short film A 45 for the Month's Expenses (2000), which won the Best Short Film award from Conacine (now DAFO, part of the Ministry of Culture) and was selected for the Tampere Film Festival in 2002.

Her short film, Lili’s Paradise (2009), premiered at the 47th New York Film Festival and has won 11 awards, including Best Latin-American Film at the São Paulo International Short Film Festival.

León's critically acclaimed directorial debut, Song Without a Name, premiered at the Directors' Fortnight during the 2019 Cannes Film Festival, making her the first Peruvian director to be selected by the festival.

== Filmography ==
Year	Title	Notes	Ref.
2000	A 45 for the Month's Expenses	Short film	
2007	Girl with a Walkman	Short film	
2009	Lili's Paradise	Short film	
2019	Song Without a Name		
