= Dominga Sotomayor =

Filmmaker from Chile

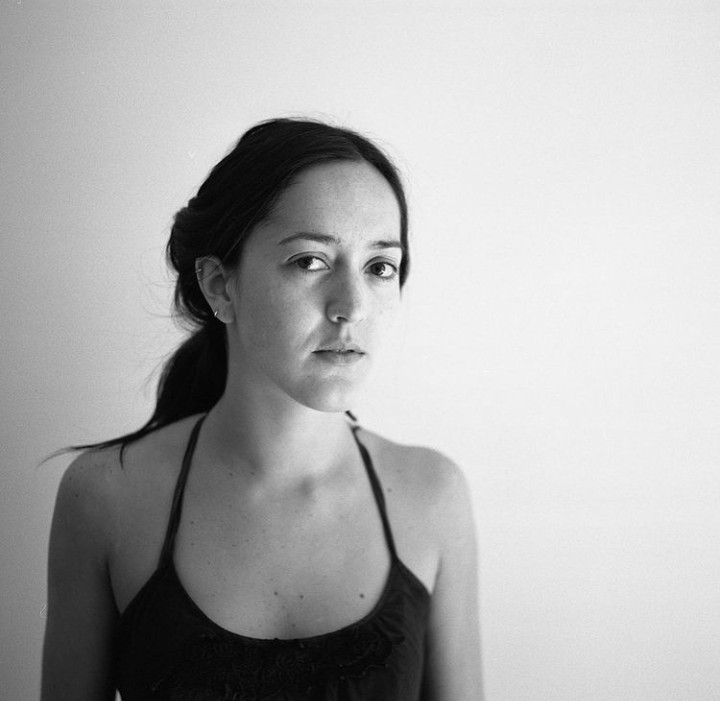
- Born: Dominga Sotomayor Castillo; 1985 (age 40–41); Santiago, Chile
- Occupation: Film director

Dominga Sotomayor Castillo (born 1985) is a Chilean filmmaker.

== Biography ==
Sotomayor graduated from Universidad Católica de Chile with a degree in audiovisual direction in 2007, followed by a master's degree at the Escola de Cinema y Audiovisuals de Catalunya (ESCAC) in film directing. She directed several short films that were shown at festivals internationally. Sotomayor was part of Berlinale Talents in 2009.

Her first feature film, Thursday Till Sunday (De jueves a domingo) was developed as part of the program La Résidence by Cinéfondation / Festival de Cannes, and premiered at the International Film Festival Rotterdam, where it was awarded the Hivos Tiger Award.

In 2014, her 60 min film Mar premiered at the Forum section at the Berlinale.

Her next feature Too Late to Die Young (Tarde para morir joven), premiered at the Locarno Film Festival and brought her the Leopard for Best Direction. Sotomayor is the first ever woman to win this award.

She was one of the seven directors of the feature film The Year of the Everlasting Storm, alongside Jafar Panahi, Anthony Chen, Malik Vitthal, Laura Poitras, David Lowery and Apichatpong Weerasethakul. The film premiered at Cannes' Special Screenings in 2021.

In 2021, Sotomayor started working on her third feature Niebla. The movie is produced by Rodrigo Teixeira (RT Features). Over the past decade she has also taught film courses and gave talks in Chile and abroad and made videos and photographs for exhibitions, like "Little Sun" (Olafur Eliasson, 2012) at the Tate Modern in London. She was a guest lecturer at Harvard University's Department of Art, Film, and Visual Studies in 2020-23. Sotomayor was one of the artists working for the Chilean Pavilion at the Biennale Art exhibition that opened in April 2022.

Since 2015, Sotomayor has been active as a producer. With Omar Zuñiga she co-founded the Cinestacion production company. Her credits as a producer include Felipe Galvez's Chilean Western The Settlers, Manuela Martelli's directorial feature debut 1976, and The Last Land by Paraguayan Pablo Lamar. She also produced Prison in the Andes (Penal Cordillera) by Felipe Carmona.

== Filmography ==
=== Feature films ===
Year	English Title	Original Title	Notes
2012	Thursday Till Sunday	De Jueves a Domingo	
2018	Too Late to Die Young	Tarde para morir joven	
2026	La Perra		Post-production

=== Short films ===
- Cessna (2005)
- Noviembre (2007)
- Debajo (2007)
- La montaña (2008)
- Videojuego (2008)
- La Isla (2013)
- Mar (2014)
- Los barcos (2016)
- Correspondencia (2020 co-directed with Carla Simón)
- The Year of the Everlasting Storm (2021) - Anthology film
