= Ryan Heller =

American film producer

- Education: Boston College (BA); New York University (MBA/MFA)
- Occupations: Film producer; Media Executive

Ryan Heller is an American film producer and an executive at Topic Studios where he serves as Head of Film and Documentary. Heller has served as a producer and executive producer on a number of feature films, including Nanny, The Climb, A Real Pain, Splitsville, Club Kid, The Debut and Wicker.

Heller served as an executive producer of the HBO documentary series 100 Foot Wave, which was nominated for the Primetime Emmy Award for Outstanding Documentary or Nonfiction Series in 2022 and 2023 and won the award in 2025.

== Education ==
Heller holds a BA from Boston College and an MBA/MFA dual degree from New York University. He studied in a joint program combining business courses at the Stern School of Business with filmmaking at the Tisch School of the Arts.

== Career ==
Heller was a guitarist in the Boston-based indie rock band Aberdeen City, whose members met at Boston College. In 2008, Heller made his final appearance as an official member of Aberdeen City at a concert opening for the Hold Steady in Boston. He left the band to attend graduate school in New York.

In February 2017, Heller joined First Look Media from Starz Entertainment, where he had served as senior director of acquisitions and distribution at Starz Digital. At First Look Media, Heller was responsible for developing new partnerships and expanding the number of titles acquired by the company. In March 2017, The Hollywood Reporter reported that First Look Media's expanding film, television and digital slate was being developed under the newly branded Topic banner.

Heller has championed projects from new filmmakers including Nanny, directed by Nikyatu Jusu, the first horror film to win the Sundance Grand Jury Prize and The Climb, directed by Michael Angelo Covino, won the Un Certain Regard prize at the Cannes Film Festival. He oversaw three Topic Studios films which premiered at the 2023 Sundance Film Festival: Brandon Cronenberg's Infinity Pool, produced in partnership with Neon; Randall Park's Shortcomings; and Theater Camp, directed by Molly Gordon and Nick Lieberman. Other projects he oversaw at Topic Studios included Pablo Larraín's Spencer, Kevin Macdonald's The Mauritanian, and the HBO documentary series 100 Foot Wave. Documentary projects on which he served as an executive producer included Nuclear Family, Bring Your Own Brigade, and Turn Every Page – The Adventures of Robert Caro and Robert Gottlieb. In January 2023, Heller was promoted to executive vice president of film and documentary at Topic Studios.

In 2025, Heller served as a producer on Splitsville, directed by Michael Angelo Covino, which premiered in the Premieres section of the 2025 Cannes Film Festival. Earlier that year, he produced the documentaries It's Never Over, Jeff Buckley and Folktales, which premiered at the Sundance Film Festival. He also executive produced A Real Pain, which received two Academy Award nominations and won Kieran Culkin the Academy Award for Best Supporting Actor.

In 2026, Heller served as a producer on Jordan Firstman's Club Kid, which had its world premiere in the Un Certain Regard section of the 2026 Cannes Film Festival. Following its premiere, the film was acquired by A24 after a competitive bidding process. Serving as Head of Film and Documentary at Topic, Heller's credits include Wicker, a fantasy drama starring Olivia Colman and Alexander Skarsgård that premiered at the Sundance Film Festival, and Jesse Eisenberg's The Debut, which premiered at the 2026 Telluride Film Festival and will be released by A24 December 2026.

== Filmography ==
=== Feature film ===
Year	Title	Role
2019	Pahokee	Executive producer
2019	The Climb	Executive producer
2020	The Nowhere Inn	Executive producer
2021	The Mauritanian	Executive producer
2021	Spencer	Executive producer
2021	Italian Studies	Executive producer
2022	Nanny	Executive producer
2022	God's Time	Executive producer
2023	Infinity Pool	Executive producer
2023	Shortcomings	Executive producer
2023	Theater Camp	Producer
2024	A Real Pain	Executive producer
2025	Splitsville	Producer
2026	Wicker	Producer
2026	Mother Mary	Executive producer
2026	Club Kid	Producer
2026	The Debut	Executive producer

=== Documentary film ===
Year	Title	Role
2019	Wrinkles the Clown	Executive producer
2021	Bring Your Own Brigade	Executive producer
2021	Bernstein's Wall	Executive producer
2021	Nuclear Family	Executive producer
2021	Bring Your Own Brigade	Executive producer
2022	Turn Every Page – The Adventures of Robert Caro and Robert Gottlieb	Executive producer
2023	Caterpillar	Executive producer
2025	It's Never Over, Jeff Buckley	Producer
2025	Folktales	Executive producer

=== Television ===
Year	Title	Role	Notes
2013–2014	Hollywood Acting Studio	Executive producer	12 episodes
2013–2015	Tvoovies	Executive producer	29 episodes
2014	Llama Cop	Executive producer	6-episode television series
2018	The Artists	Producer	10-episode miniseries
2021–2025	100 Foot Wave	Executive producer	Documentary series; 17 episodes
