= Eldar Isgandarov =

Azerbaijani actor

- Isgandarov at the 2026 New York Film Festival
- Born: Eldar İsgəndərov; Baku, Azerbaijan
- Occupation: Actor
- Years active: 2021–present
- Relatives: Shahmar Alakbarov (grandfather)

Eldar Isgandarov (Azerbaijani: Eldar İsgəndərov) is an Azerbaijani actor known for roles in Club Kid (2026) and The Debut (2026).

== Biography ==
Originally from Azerbaijan, Isgandarov is the grandson of People's Artist of the Azerbaijan SSR Shahmar Alakbarov. He was raised in Belgium and the Netherlands, and graduated from the Savannah College of Art and Design.

Isgandarov got his breakthrough role in Jordan Firstman's comedy-drama film Club Kid, which premiered at the 2026 Cannes Film Festival. His performance as an aspiring queer philosopher who lives as a roommate to Firstman's lead character, Peter has received positive reviews. Slant Magazine noted that Isgandarov, "playing a would-be philosopher from Azerbaijan whom Peter eventually kicks out of his apartment, is so committed to the bit that even his most outlandish pronouncements land as believable." Screen International described his performance as "riotously funny", whereas The Hollywood Reporter noted that he gives some of the film's funniest line readings.

He next appeared in the Jesse Eisenberg-directed musical comedy-drama The Debut (2026), opposite Julianne Moore and Paul Giamatti. A review in The Playlist called Isgandarov's performance as Piotr, the assistant director to Paul Giamatti's character, a "scene-stealer". The A.V. Club also highlighted his performance while praising the film's ensemble cast. He was also cast opposite Benicio del Toro and Cameron Diaz in the upcoming film Reenactment.

== Filmography ==
Key
†	Denotes productions that have not yet been released

Year	Title	Role	Notes
2026	Club Kid	Nicky	
2026	The Debut	Piotr	
TBD	Peaked †		
TBD	Reenactment †		
