= Kyle Marvin =

American director

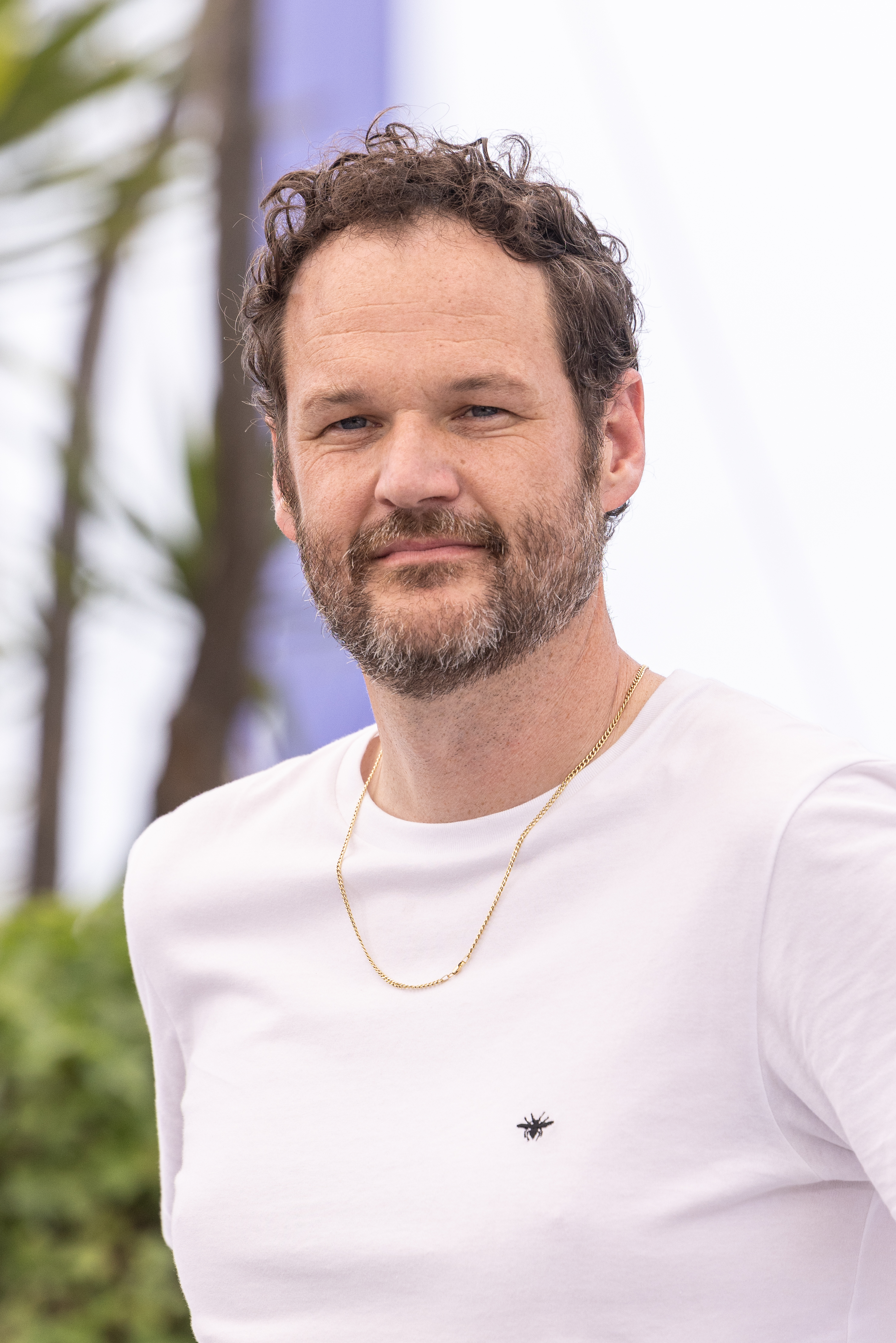
- Marvin at the 2025 Cannes Film Festival
- Born: Portland, Oregon
- Occupations: Director, screenwriter, producer, actor.
- Years active: 2012–present

Kyle Marvin is an American film director, screenwriter, producer, and actor. He directed 80 for Brady (2023), and co-wrote and starred in The Climb (2019) and Splitsville (2025).

== Early life ==
Marvin grew up in Portland, Oregon, and has spoken about an outdoorsy childhood there, crediting his parents' interests in mountaineering and outdoor education with shaping his early years.

He graduated from the Delphian School in 2004 and chose not to attend college after high school.

== Career ==
Marvin is a frequent collaborator with friend Michael Angelo Covino, with the two serving as producers on Kicks by Justin Tipping and Hunter Gatherer by Josh Locy, and working on commercials and music videos. The two run the production company Watch This Ready.

In 2018, Marvin co-wrote and starred in The Climb, a short film, which had its world premiere at the 2018 Sundance Film Festival. It was later expanded into a feature length film of the same name which had its world premiere at the Cannes Film Festival in May 2019, and was released in November 2020, by Sony Pictures Classics.

In 2022, Marvin starred in WeCrashed for Apple TV+.

In 2023, Marvin made his directorial debut with 80 for Brady following lifelong friends who travel to watch Tom Brady in the Super Bowl.

In 2025, Marvin co-wrote and starred opposite Covino, Adria Arjona and Dakota Johnson in Splitsville which had its world premiere at the 2025 Cannes Film Festival. It was released by Neon.

== Filmography ==
=== Film ===
Year	Title	Role	Notes	Ref.
2018	The Climb	Kyle	Short film	
2019	The Climb	Kyle		
2025	Splitsville	Carey		
TBA	Trash Mountain	TBA	Filming	

=== Television ===
Year	Title	Role	Notes	Ref.
2012	The Culhaney Chronicles	Ron Kazitsky	TV mini series	
2017	All Wrong	Waiter	Episode: "The Final Cumdown"	
2022	WeCrashed	Miguel McKelvey	Main role, 8 episodes	
