= The Debut (2026 film) =

Musical-comedy film by Jesse Eisenberg

- Theatrical release poster
- Directed by: Jesse Eisenberg
- Written by: Jesse Eisenberg
- Produced by: Emma Stone; Dave McCary; Ali Herting; Jesse Eisenberg
- Starring: Julianne Moore; Paul Giamatti; Halle Bailey; Colton Ryan; Jesse Eisenberg; Bonnie Milligan; Lilli Cooper; Maulik Pancholy; Bernadette Peters
- Cinematography: Drew Daniels
- Edited by: Robert Nassau
- Music by: Emile Mosseri (score); Jesse Eisenberg (songs)
- Production companies: Topic Studios; Fruit Tree
- Distributed by: A24
- Release dates: September 5, 2026 (Telluride); December 11, 2026 (United States)
- Running time: 105 minutes
- Country: United States
- Language: English

The Debut is a 2026 American musical comedy-drama film written, co-produced and directed by Jesse Eisenberg. The film stars Julianne Moore as Mona Friedman, a New Jersey housewife who auditions for a part in a fictional musical run by a strong-willed and enigmatic director (Paul Giamatti). The film also stars Halle Bailey, Colton Ryan, Eisenberg, Bonnie Milligan, and Lilli Cooper, in supporting roles.

The Debut premiered at the 53rd Telluride Film Festival on September 5, 2026, and is scheduled be released in the United States by A24 on December 11, 2026.

== Premise ==
A shy New Jersey housewife auditions for a part in the Brook Arts Center production of the fictional musical Nosy Neighbors and is cast in the supporting role of Miss Danielle. Under the spell of the "strong-willed" and "enigmatic" director Jerry, her life begins to unravel as she slowly becomes more and more consumed with playing the part.

== Cast ==
- Julianne Moore as Mona Friedman, a shy housewife in New Jersey who auditions for Nosy Neighbors
- Paul Giamatti as Jerry Blankenbuehler, the director of the musical
- Halle Bailey as Stef Mercer, an actress in the musical
- Colton Ryan as Zachary Feldman, an actor in the musical
- Jesse Eisenberg as Todd Brennan, an actor in the musical
- Bonnie Milligan as Trish Donnelly, an actress in the musical
- Lilli Cooper as Shauna McCarthy
- Maulik Pancholy as Eli Kaplan, a priest
- Bernadette Peters as Serena Cherry, a well-known theatre actress
- Cara Buono as Cassie
- Havana Rose Liu as Twisty
- Eldar Isgandarov as Piotr, Jerry's assistant director
- Patrick Fabian as Howard, Mona's husband
- K. Todd Freeman as Martin Reed, the musical director
- Craig Bierko as Steve
- Danny Burstein as a Patron
- Susan Blommaert as Sybil Hart
- Stephen Adly Guirgis as Tenant
- Jonah Diamand as Matty, Mona's son
- Becca Suskauer as Maya
- Danny McCarthy as male testimonial
- Ana Yi Puig as Madeline
- Christopher Fitzgerald as Grocery Man
- Andy Grotelueschen as Motel Man
- Nikka Graff Lanzarone as Dog Woman

== Production ==
Deadline Hollywood announced in November 2024 that Jesse Eisenberg would be directing and writing a musical comedy, with Julianne Moore and Paul Giamatti starring; the project marks the second collaboration between Eisenberg and Moore following 2022's When You Finish Saving the World. In April 2025, Halle Bailey, Havana Rose Liu, Bernadette Peters, Bonnie Milligan, Colton Ryan, Lilli Cooper and Maulik Pancholy joined the cast, with A24 boarding as distributor, and principal photography commencing. Emma Stone, Dave McCary, Ali Herting of Fruit Tree produced, alongside Eisenberg. Topic Studios executive produced. In June 2026, the title was revealed as The Debut.

== Musical numbers ==
The musical within the film includes 13 original songs written by Eisenberg.

- "The Boy from 26A / Girl in 4F" – Girl in 4F (Halle Bailey), Boy from 26A (Colton Ryan), Ensemble
- "Needle in a Haystack" – Young Mom with Stroller (Bonnie Milligan), Girl in 4F (Bailey)
- "Aren't We Still Strangers?" – Woman with Shoes (Lilli Cooper), Barnaby (Jesse Eisenberg)
- "All Backed Up" – Barnaby (Eisenberg)
- "Where's My Shoe?" – Woman with Shoes (Cooper)
- "The Opposite of Up" – The Ghost of Fiorello La Guardia (Maulik Pancholy)
- "Another Bill (Ugh!)" – City Councilwoman (Megumi Nakamura)
- "Count Your Blessings (By Counting By Fives)" – Young Mom with Stroller (Milligan), Boy from 26A (Ryan)
- "Right Place, Right Time" – Girl in 4F (Bailey)
- "Another Bill (Ugh!)" (reprise) – City Councilwoman (Megumi Nakamura), Company
- "Blackout" – Grumpy Tennant (Jared Loftin), Company
- "This City May Have Chewed Me Up (But It Hasn't Spit Me Out)" – Miss Danielle (Julianne Moore)
- "One Bedroom, Two Hearts" – Company

== Release ==
The film had its world premiere at the 53rd Telluride Film Festival on September 5, 2026. It was also selected for the 2026 Toronto International Film Festival, the main competition of the 74th San Sebastián International Film Festival, and the Spotlight Gala section of the 2026 New York Film Festival.The film was screened at the 2026 Zurich Film Festival, where Julianne Moore was presented with the Golden Icon Award. The film will close 2026 BFI London Film Festival on October 18, and will be the centerpiece of the 2026 Savannah Film Festival, where Julianne Moore will be presented with the Icon Award on October 27. It was shown to a sold-out crowd on October 21 at the Paramount Theater as the opening movie of the Virginia Film Festival in Charlottesville, Virginia. It will also screen at the 15th Montclair Film Festival on October 24. It will be presented in the Grand public section of the 21st Rome Film Festival in October 2026.

The Debut is scheduled to be released in the United States on December 11, 2026, by A24. It will be theatrically released in the United Kingdom on January 15, 2027, by Lionsgate.

== Reception ==
=== Critical response ===
On review aggregator Rotten Tomatoes, the film holds an approval rating of 91% based on 78 reviews, with an average rating of 8.1/10. The site's critical consensus reads, "Wryly teasing the self-seriousness of community theater while still recognizing the transformative power of the stage, The Debut is an acerbic gem from Jesse Eisenberg, enlivened by Julianne Moore and Paul Giamatti at the peak of their powers." On Metacritic, the film has a weighted average score of 76 out of 100, based on 23 critics, indicating "generally favorable" reviews.

Matthew Joseph Jenner of International Cinephile Society rated The Debut 4½ out of 5 stars, declaring it "a terrific film that knows exactly what it takes to keep the audience invested".

=== Accolades ===
Award	Date of ceremony	Category	Recipient(s)	Result	Ref.
Middleburg Film Festival	18 October 2026	Audience Award	The Debut	Won	
San Sebastián International Film Festival	26 September 2026	Golden Shell for Best Film	The Debut	Nominated	
San Sebastián International Film Festival	26 September 2026	Feroz Zinemaldia Award	The Debut	Won	
San Sebastián International Film Festival	26 September 2026	SGAE Award for Best Original Music	Emile Mosseri	Nominated	
Savannah Film Festival	31 October 2026	Icon Award	Julianne Moore	Won	
Zurich Film Festival	25 September 2026	Golden Icon Award	Julianne Moore	Won	
Hamilton Behind The Camera Awards	13 November 2026	Production Design	Ann Ross	Won	
Hollywood Music in Media Awards	18 November 2026	Best Original Song – Independent Film	"This City May Have Chewed Me Up (But It Hasn’t Spit Me Out)" – Jesse Eisenberg	Nominated	
Hollywood Music in Media Awards	18 November 2026	Song – Onscreen Performance (Film)	"This City May Have Chewed Me Up (But It Hasn’t Spit Me Out)" – Julianne Moore	Nominated	
Gotham Independent Film Awards	30 November 2026	Best Feature	Jesse Eisenberg, Ali Herting, Dave McCary, Emma Stone	Pending	
Gotham Independent Film Awards	30 November 2026	Outstanding Lead Performance	Julianne Moore	Pending	
