= Reggie Absolom =

British actor

- Reggie Absolom at the 2026 New York Film Festival
- Born: 2011 or 2012 (age 14–15)
- Occupation: Actor
- Notable work: Club Kid

Reggie Absolom is a British actor. He is best known for playing Arlo, the son of Jordan Firstman's character, in Firstman's 2026 feature directorial debut Club Kid. He has also appeared in the Apple TV+ series Silo and the BBC series The Other Bennet Sister.

== Career ==
Absolom played Benny in the second season of Silo, and George Gardiner in the BBC adaptation The Other Bennet Sister, which also starred Ruth Jones and Richard E. Grant. His other credits include the short films Fly! and Dressed to the Nines.

In Club Kid, Absolom co-starred as Arlo, a boy who is left with a New York party promoter (Firstman), who was unaware he was Arlo's father. Absolom said that he and Firstman bonded over music, including the Cocteau Twins and Massive Attack. The film premiered in the Un Certain Regard section of the 2026 Cannes Film Festival, where it received a seven-minute standing ovation. During the ovation, Firstman picked Absolom up and started a chant in his honour. The film later screened at the Telluride Film Festival, the Toronto International Film Festival, and in the Spotlight section of the New York Film Festival.

Critics generally praised Absolom's performance. Guy Lodge of Variety described it as a "mature, appealing performance", and Andy Howell of Film Threat wrote that Absolom was charismatic and charming while conveying a child's fear and uncertainty.

In September 2026, Absolom signed with United Talent Agency.

== Filmography ==
=== Film ===
Year	Title	Role	Notes
2023	Fly!	Charles	Short film
2025	Dressed to the Nines	Luke	Short film
2026	Club Kid	Arlo	

=== Television ===
Year	Title	Role	Notes
2025	Silo	Benny	Season 2
2026	The Other Bennet Sister	George Gardiner	
