= William E. Lehman (architect) =

American architect

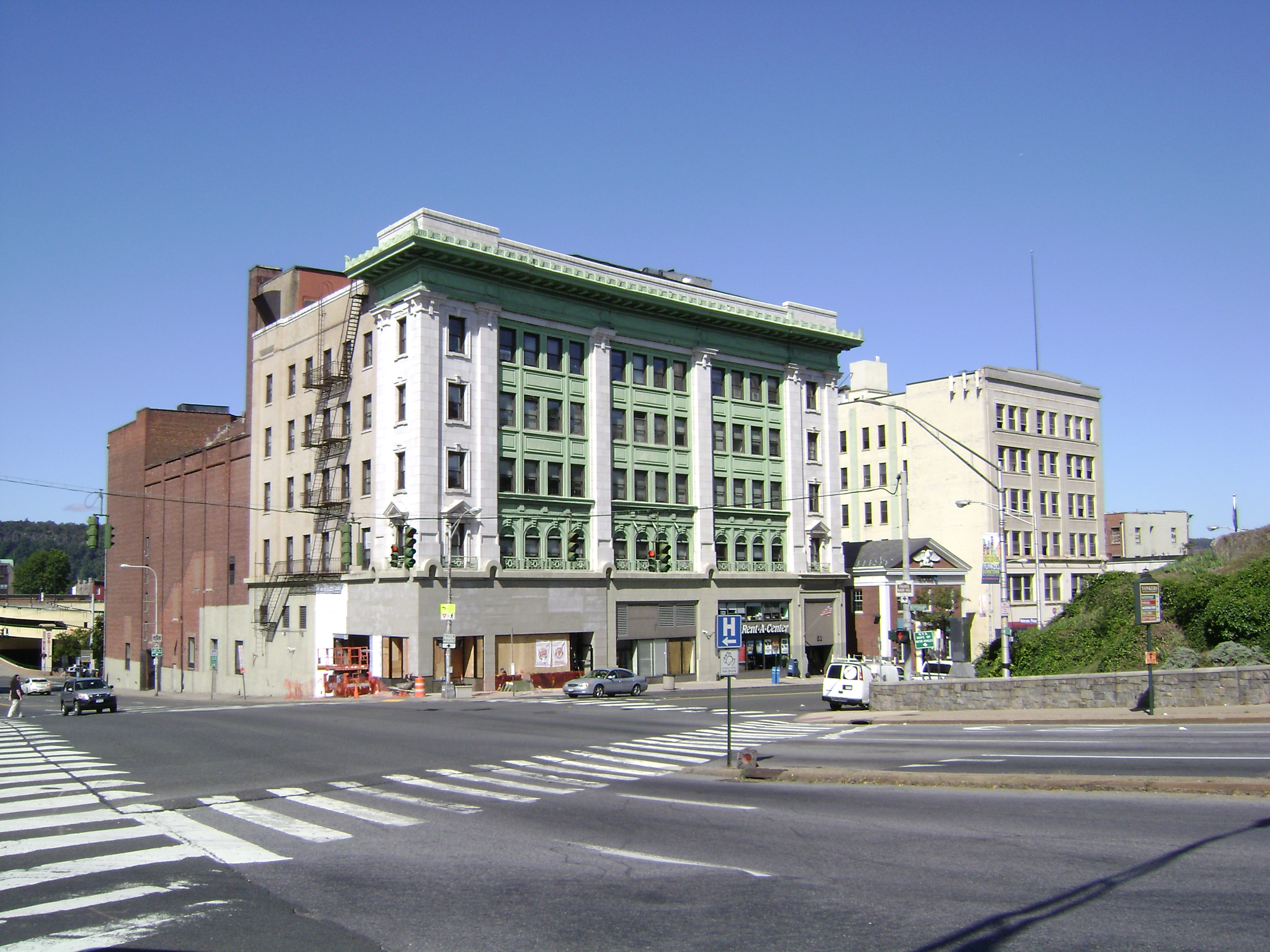
Proctor's Palace in Yonkers, New York

William E. Lehman (1874–1951) was an architect based in New Jersey. He designed numerous theaters. He designed Proctor's Palace in Yonkers, New York. His firm was founded in 1896 and was located in Newark. He graduated from the Cornell University School of Architecture in 1895. His brother David J. Lehman joined the firm in 1912. The firm is responsible for public buildings and private residences in New Jersey and other Eastern states.

== Works ==
Theaters credited to Lehman include:

- Adams Theatre at 28 Branford Place in Newark
- Kingston Theatre at 323 Wall Street in Kingston, New York (still in use)
- Brook Arts Center at 10 Hamilton Street in Bound Brook, New Jersey (still in use)
- Count Basie Theatre at 99-101 Monmouth Street in Red Bank, New Jersey (still in use)
- Maplewood Theatre at 155 Maplewood Avenue in Maplewood, New Jersey (still in use)
- Loew's Melba Theatre at 300 Livingston Street in Brooklyn, New York
- Oritani Theatre at 300 Main Street in Hackensack, New Jersey
- Proctor's Palace at 53 S. Broadway in Yonkers, New York
- Roosevelt Theatre at 714 Summit Avenue in Union City, New Jersey
- Sanford Theater at 1269 Springfield Avenue in Irvington, New Jersey
