= Michael Angelo Covino =

American director (born 1984)

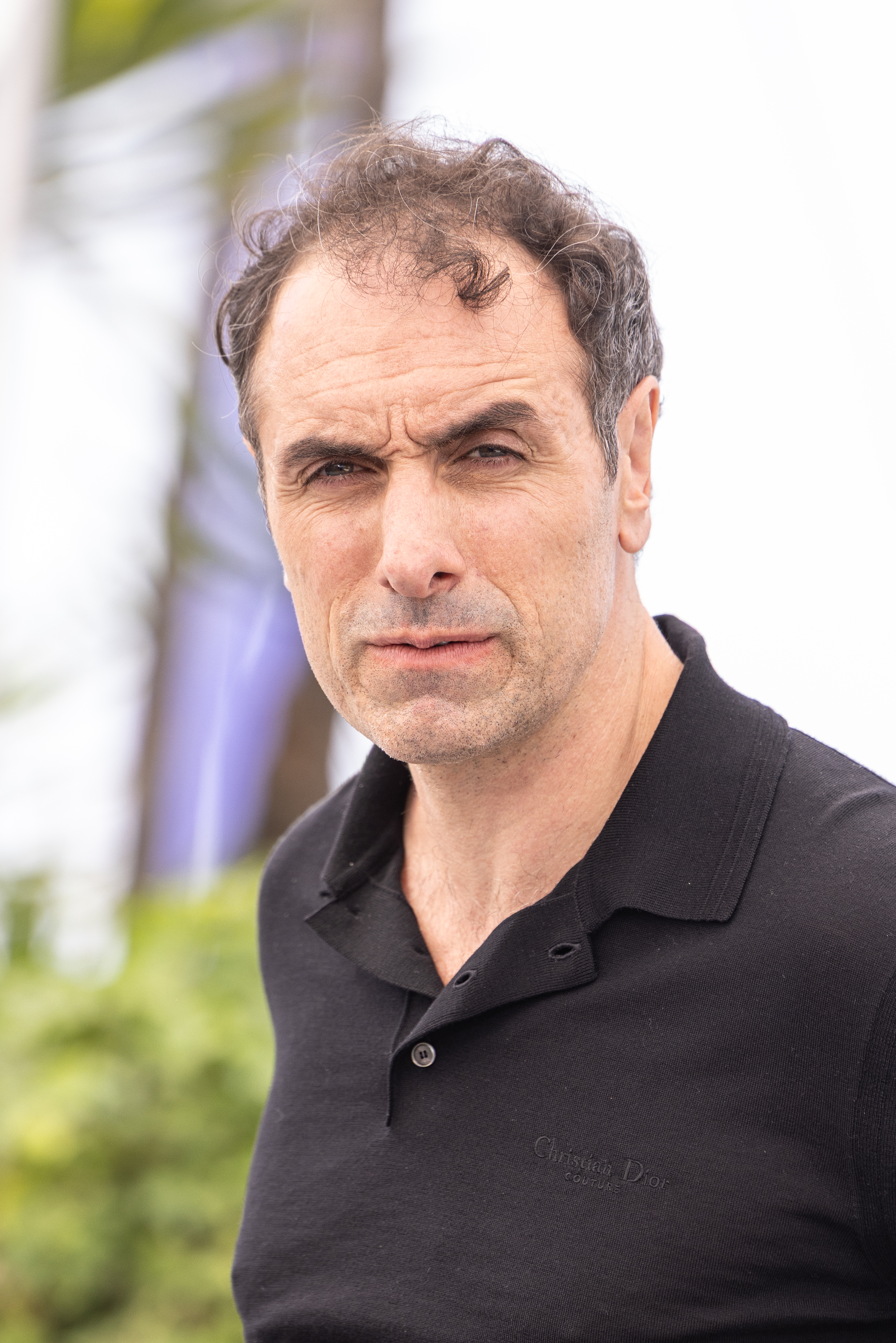
- Covino at the 2025 Cannes Film Festival
- Born: 1984; Mount Kisco, New York
- Occupations: Director, screenwriter, producer, actor.
- Years active: 2007–present

Michael Angelo Covino (born 1984) is an American film director, screenwriter, producer, and actor. He has produced, written, directed, and starred in The Climb (2019) and Splitsville (2025).

== Early life ==
Covino graduated from Occidental College.

== Career ==
Covino is a frequent collaborator with friend Kyle Marvin, with the two serving as producers on Kicks by Justin Tipping and Hunter Gatherer by Josh Locy, and working on commercials and music videos. The two run the production company Watch This Ready.

In 2018, Covino directed, starred, and co-wrote alongside Marvin on The Climb, a short film focusing on a friendship between two lifelong friends, which premiered at the 2018 Sundance Film Festival. The short was later expanded into a feature-length film of the same name, financed by Topic Studios.

The Climb premiered at the 2019 Cannes Film Festival in the Un Certain Regard section, where it was acquired by Sony Pictures Classics. It subsequently screened at the Telluride Film Festival, Toronto International Film Festival, and Sundance Film Festival. It was released in November 2020, following delays due to the COVID-19 pandemic.

In 2025, Covino's second film, Splitsville, which he co-wrote with Marvin and in which he stars opposite Dakota Johnson and Adria Arjona, had its world premiere at the 2025 Cannes Film Festival. The film was released by Neon.

As an actor, Covino has starred in News of the World (2020) by Paul Greengrass, Riff Raff (2024) by Dito Montiel, and Notice to Quit (also 2024) by Simon Hacker.

== Filmography ==
Year	Title	Director	Producer	Writer	Actor
2019	The Climb	Yes	Yes	Yes	Yes
2020	News of the World	No	No	No	Yes
2024	Riff Raff	No	No	No	Yes
2024	Notice to Quit	No	executive	No	Yes
2025	Splitsville	Yes	Yes	Yes	Yes
2026	Josephine	No	No	No	Yes
2027	Alone at Dawn	No	No	No	Yes
