= Wicker (film) =

2026 film by Alex Huston Fischer and Eleanor Wilson

- Theatrical release poster
- Directed by: Alex Huston Fischer; Eleanor Wilson
- Screenplay by: Alex Huston Fischer; Eleanor Wilson
- Based on: "The Wicker Husband" by Ursula Wills
- Produced by: Ed Sinclair; Tom Carver; Olivia Colman; Justin Lothrop; Brent Stiefel; Brad Zimmerman; David Michôd; Andrea Cornwell; Oliver Kassman; Tim Headington; Lia Buman; Ryan Heller; Michael Bloom
- Starring: Olivia Colman; Alexander Skarsgård; Elizabeth Debicki; Marli Siu; Nabhaan Rizwan; Richard E. Grant; Peter Dinklage
- Cinematography: Lol Crawley
- Edited by: Sofi Marshall
- Music by: Anna Meredith
- Production companies: Topic Studios; Tango Entertainment; Votiv; Yoki, Inc.; South of the River Pictures
- Distributed by: Black Bear Pictures (United Kingdom and United States); Roadshow Films (Australia)
- Release dates: January 24, 2026 (Sundance); October 23, 2026 (United States); October 30, 2026 (United Kingdom); November 5, 2026 (Australia)
- Running time: 105 minutes
- Countries: Australia; United Kingdom; United States
- Language: English
- Budget: $10 million
- Box office: $40.3 million

Wicker is a 2026 romantic fantasy comedy-drama film written and directed by Alex Huston Fischer and Eleanor Wilson, based on the short story "The Wicker Husband" by Ursula Wills. The film stars Olivia Colman, Alexander Skarsgård, Elizabeth Debicki, Marli Siu, Nabhaan Rizwan, Richard E. Grant, and Peter Dinklage.

Wicker premiered at the 2026 Sundance Film Festival on January 24, 2026, and was released by Black Bear Pictures in the United States on October 23, 2026, and the United Kingdom on October 30, 2026. The film received positive reviews from critics.

== Plot ==
A solitary Fisherwoman lives on the outskirts of a village and is often mocked and harassed for her spinster status. At the wedding of the Tailor's Wife's Sister to the inn's Bottlewasher, he struggles to fasten a ritual collar around her neck. After the wedding, unmarried women ritually shake small baskets containing eggs, which emit yellow smoke. The Fisherwoman's dropped basket shakes by itself and emits purple smoke, indicating that she will be the next to marry. The village women take this as a negative omen.

The Fisherwoman visits the village Basket Weaver and commissions him to make her a husband. The Basket Weaver accepts and tells her to meet him at the chapel in one month. On the eve of the wedding, the Wicker Husband arrives in the village, asking for clothing, shoes and lodging to prepare for the ceremony. The Fisherwoman and the Wicker Husband wed, during which he declines to put a collar on her. While consummating their union, the bed collapses, and the Wicker Husband offers to repair it. He soon completes many tasks to improve the Fisherwoman's modest hut, such as gardening and repairing her roof.

Their marriage becomes the talk of the village. At the Butcher's wedding, their unique dancing becomes a spectacle, and the women are moved by the Wicker Husband's romantic overtures to his wife. The men of the village become leery of the Wicker Husband, whose kind demeanor contrasts their boorish behavior toward their own wives. At the inn, the men question his motive behind his domestic labour. He answers that his wife's happiness makes him happy.

The men remain skeptical, though the Bottlewasher resolves to repair his own home's roof to please his wife, which goes awry when the roof collapses and he falls into the house. The town's Doctor attempts to heal the Bottlewasher, but his wounds become fatal. The Wicker Husband soothingly embraces the Bottlewasher's bereft wife after the funeral, stoking the Fisherwoman's suspicions, planted by the Tailor's Wife, that he has been unfaithful. He implores her to trust him.

The Bottlewasher's widow visits the Basket Weaver and asks him to make her a baby. Shortly after, the Tailor's Wife discovers the wicker child. She brings her sister to the Fisherwoman's hut, claiming the child is proof of the Wicker Husband's infidelity and threatening to burn it if the Fisherwoman and her husband do not claim the child. The Wicker Husband insists the child is not his, but seeks to protect it still. The Fisherwoman throws her lantern at the Wicker Husband, who runs burning into the woods. Wracked with guilt and grief, she becomes reclusive again.

In spring, the Fisherwoman discovers the wicker child in the woods and takes him into her care. Meanwhile, the Basket Weaver finds the charred but living Wicker Husband and brings him to his workshop to repair him. The Basket Weaver visits the Fisherwoman, explains his role in the child's creation, and helps reconcile the couple. At the village market, he announces his retirement, and one final creation - a Wicker Woman, to be given to whomever presents him the most generous retirement gift. The village greedily, excitedly dreams of the Wicker Woman's value.

When the Basket Weaver returns with the veiled Wicker Woman, the villagers shower him with luxurious gifts. The Tailor's Wife arrives with a sack of coins, announcing she and her sister are departing the village, leaving the Wicker Woman to assume her domestic role in the Tailor's home. The lecherous Butcher, having trapped his wife in the cellar, arrives with a larger sum of money and wins the prize. The Basket Weaver departs with his gifts, explaining that the Wicker Woman is made of a different material than the Wicker Husband, who is made of supple willow. The Wicker Woman is revealed to be made of dangerous blackthorn; her kiss and touch stab the butcher, who is ignored by the surrounding villagers as he cries in pain.

Her plan thwarted, the Tailor's Wife decides to stay, though the Tailor is furious with her. Meanwhile, the Basket Weaver drives his wagon, carrying the Fisherwoman, the Wicker Husband, and the wicker child to a new life abroad.

== Cast ==
- Olivia Colman as the Fisherwoman
- Alexander Skarsgård as the Wicker Husband
- Peter Dinklage as the Basket Weaver
- Elizabeth Debicki as the Tailor's Wife
- Marli Siu as the Tailor's Wife's Sister
- Nabhaan Rizwan as the Tailor
- Phil Daniels as the Butcher
- Richard E. Grant as the Doctor
- Gustav Lindh as the Bottlewasher
- Ella Bruccoleri as the Baker's Wife
- Ben Ashenden as the Baker
- Kiell Smith-Bynoe as the Innkeeper
- Emily Lloyd-Saini as the Innkeeper's Wife

== Production ==
=== Development ===
Topic Studios and Tango Entertainment financed and produced the film with Alex Huston Fischer and Eleanor Wilson as directors, from a screenplay they adapted from the short story "The Wicker Husband" by Ursula Wills. Producers include Ed Sinclair and Tom Carver from South of The River, David Michôd and Brad Zimmerman for Yoki, Inc. and Justin Lothrop and Brent Stiefel for Votiv, as well as Olivia Colman, who leads the cast.

=== Casting ===
Alongside Colman, Dev Patel was initially attached but was replaced by Alexander Skarsgård. The cast also includes Peter Dinklage and Elizabeth Debicki.

=== Special Effects ===
The prosthetics used to turn Alexander Skarsgård into the Wicker Husband were created by Wētā Workshop in New Zealand, using a powder-bed laser-sintered printing process. They were designed by Joe Dunckley, who said that to their knowledge, they were the first 3D-modelled and digitally printed makeup appliances to be seen in film. Art direction was by Rebeckah Tisch, who said they tried to make it look bespoke, and to show that the Basketmaker was a masterful craftsman. The hair was muka, a fibre made from harakeke, New Zealand flax (Phormium tenax). The Wicker Husband's penis, seen only in a brief long shot, was added in the last week before filming began by costume designers András Dániel Tóth and Attila Godena-Juhász, using puff spandex, which was then hand-painted.

=== Filming ===
Principal photography was completed by September 2025 in Budapest.

== Release ==
Wicker was premiered at the Eccles Theater in Park City, Utah, US, as part of the Sundance Film Festival on January 24, 2026. In February 2026, Black Bear Pictures, which also handled international sales on the film, acquired North American distribution rights at the European Film Market. It closed the 59th Sitges Film Festival on October 18, 2026.

The film was released in cinemas in the United States on October 23, 2026. The film was then released a week later in the United Kingdom on October 30, 2026. The film was released in Aotearoa New Zealand in October 2026 as part of the British and Irish Film Festival. Roadshow Films released the film in Australia on November 5.

== Reception ==
=== Box office ===
As of November 22, 2026, Wicker grossed $24.4 million in the United States and Canada, and $15.9 million in other territories, for a worldwide total of $40.3 million.

In the United States and Canada, Wicker was released alongside Klara and the Sun, Clayface, Wildwood, and Ali G: Who Iz I?, and was projected to gross $6–8 million from 1,471 theaters in its opening weekend. It ended up debuting to $5.7 million, finishing in fifth.

=== Critical response ===
On the review aggregator website Rotten Tomatoes, 94% of 196 critics' reviews are positive, with an average rating of 7.6/10. The site's critics consensus reads: "Wicker is a charming fable that strikes the right balance between naughty and nice, drawing much of its appeal from deftly deployed salty humor, seamless creature effects, and Olivia Colman's eminently lovable performance." Metacritic, which uses a weighted average, assigned the film a score of 70 out of 100, based on 39 critics, indicating "generally favorable" reviews. Audiences polled by PostTrak gave the film a 92% positive score, with 72% saying they would definitely recommend it.

=== Accolades ===
Award	Date of ceremony	Category	Nominee(s)	Result	Ref.
Hollywood Music in Media Awards	November 18, 2026	Best Original Score – Independent Film	Anna Meredith	Nominated	
