= Proctor's Theater (Yonkers, New York) =

- U.S. National Register of Historic Places
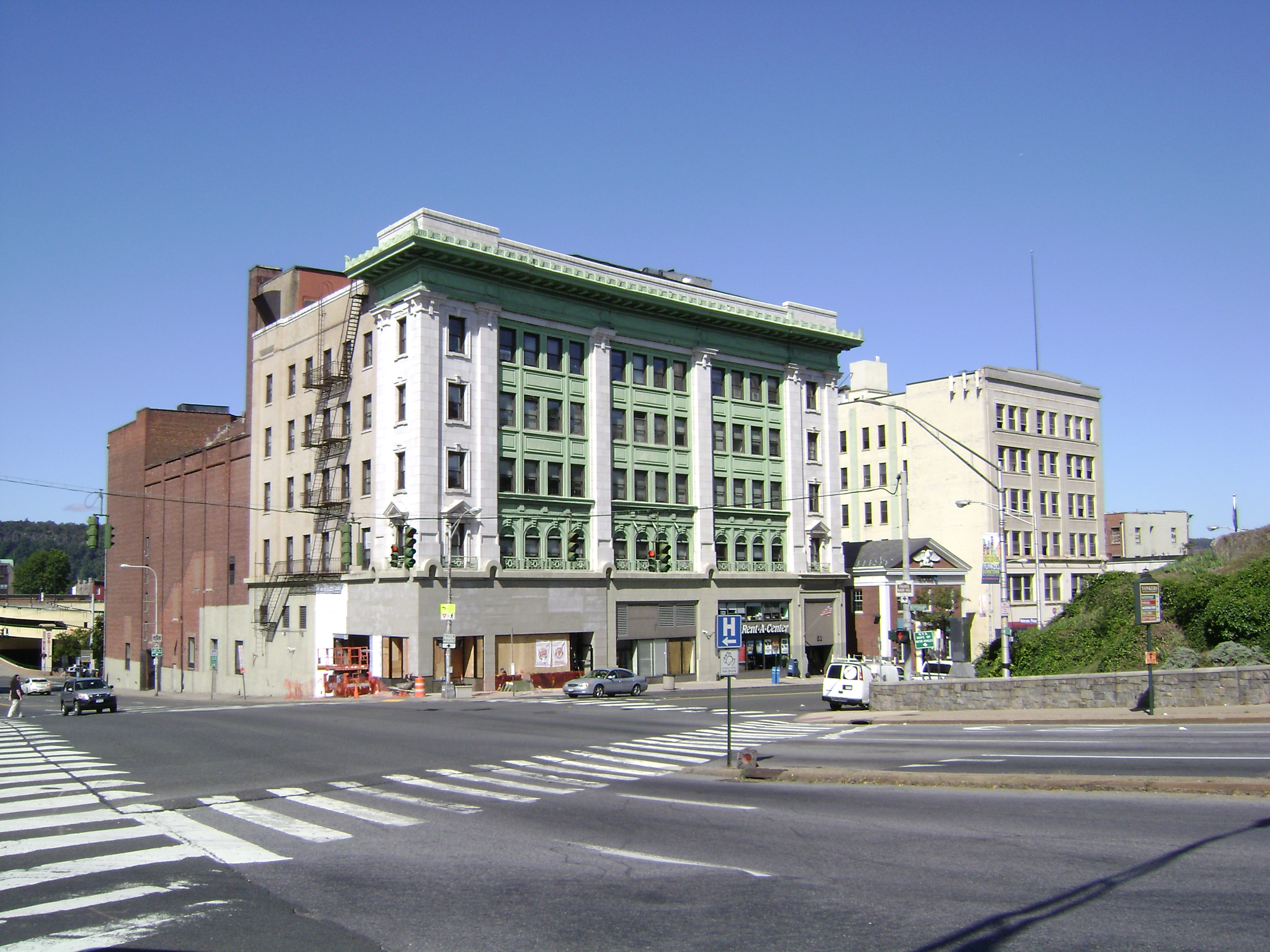
- Proctor's RKO Theater as seen from Nepperhan Avenue

- Location within New York Location within the United States
- Interactive map showing the location for Proctor’s Theatre Yonkers
- Location: 53 S. Broadway, Yonkers, New York
- Coordinates: 40°55′55.6″N 73°53′58.0″W
- Area: less than one acre
- Built: 1914
- Architect: William E. Lehman
- Architectural style: Classical Revival
- NRHP reference No.: 08001083
- Added to NRHP: November 21, 2008

Proctor's Theater, also known as Proctor's Palace and RKO Proctor's, is a historic movie theater located at Yonkers, Westchester County, New York. It was built 1914-1916 and operated initially as a vaudeville house. William E. Lehman was the theater's architect. It became part of the RKO Pictures circuit in 1929 and closed as a movie theater in 1973. It was subsequently converted to retail and office use.

It was added to the National Register of Historic Places in 2008.
