= Count Basie Center for the Arts =

Performing arts organization in Red Bank, New Jersey, United States

Coordinates: 40°20′56.4″N 74°4′12.36″W

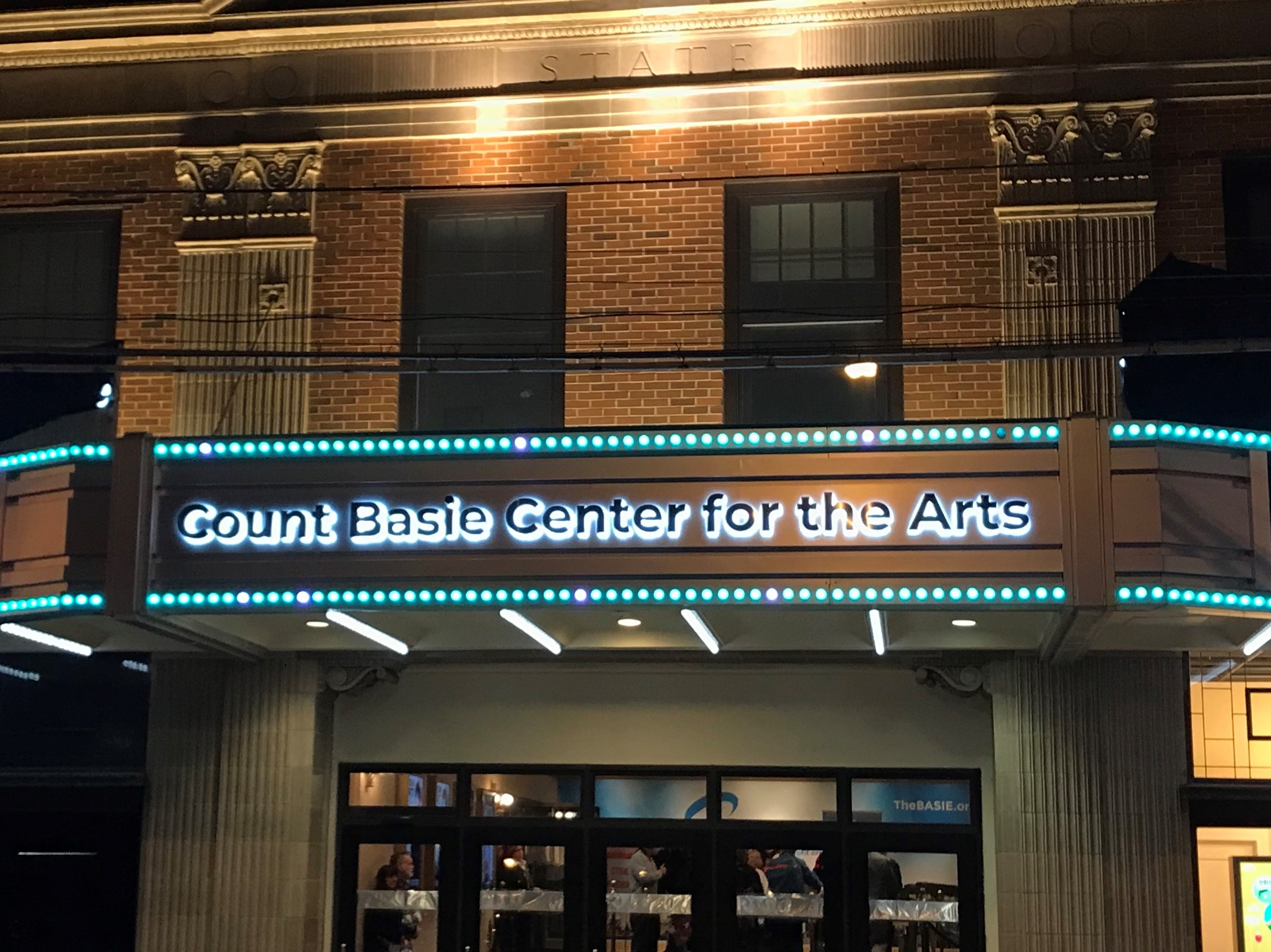
- Entrance to Count Basie Theatre in 2018
- Interactive map of Count Basie Center for the Arts
- Former names: Carlton Theater (1926–71); Monmouth Arts Center (1973–84); Count Basie Theatre (1984–2018)
- Address: 99 Monmouth Street; Red Bank, New Jersey; United States
- Capacity: 1,568 (Hackensack Meridian Health Theatre)

Construction
- Opened: November 11, 1926
- Renovated: 1971-73; 2008; 2017

Website
- The Basie
- Carlton Theater
- U.S. National Register of Historic Places
- New Jersey Register of Historic Places
- NRHP reference No.: 09001100
- NJRHP No.: 2042

Significant dates
- Added to NRHP: December 18, 2009
- Designated NJRHP: May 20, 2009

The Count Basie Center for the Arts, originally Count Basie Theatre, is a landmarked performing arts center in Red Bank, New Jersey.

The building first opened in 1926 as the Carlton Theater and later, in 1973, became known as the Monmouth Arts Center. In 1984 it was renamed the Count Basie Theatre after famed jazz musician and Red Bank native, William "Count" Basie.

In 2018, the venue changed its name to the Count Basie Center for the Arts -- ascending William Basie's name to represent the entirety of what was becoming a larger footprint for the nonprofit organization at 99 Monmouth Street. The name also paved the way for a crucial capital infusion by lending the name of the historic theater space to Hackensack Meridian Health.

Today, the Basie Center houses its iconic, historic theater, a grand lobby, the William and Catherine Basie Arts Plaza, the Grunin Arts and Education Building, the Basie Center's Turner Academy of the Arts, The Vogel concert venue, and the organization's office headquarters. The Count Basie Center organization also holds property for its community theater company, Phoenix Productions, at 59 Chestnut Street, as well as Basie Center Cinema House on nearby White Street.

The original building was designed by architect William E. Lehman and has a seating capacity of 1,568.

== History ==
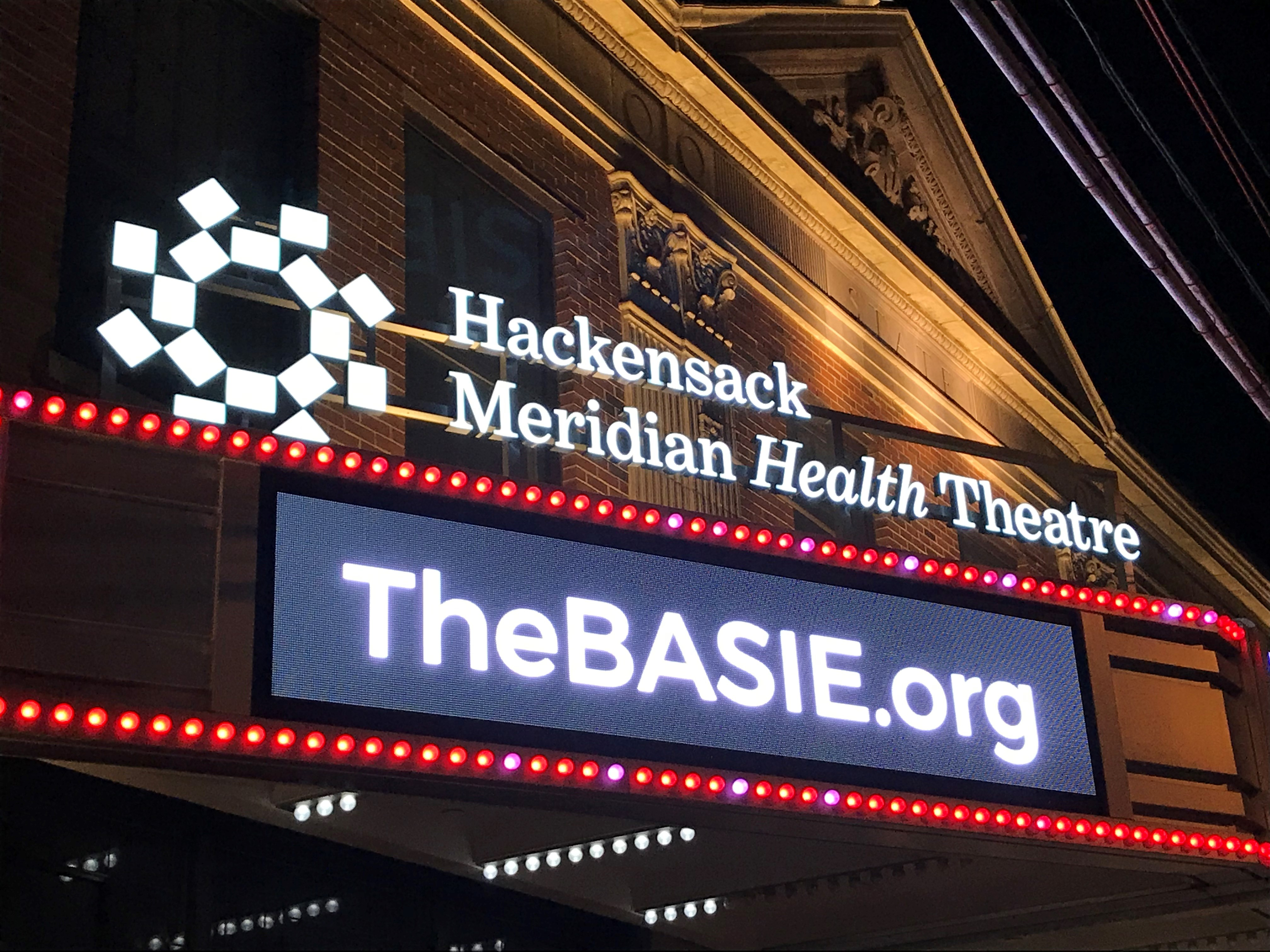
The center's marquee in 2018

Edward Franklin Albee II opened the Carlton Theater on November 11, 1926 as one of a series of Keith-Albee-Orpheum vaudeville theaters.

Opening night in 1926 included vaudeville acts and the feature film The Quarterback, starring Richard Dix. Nearly 4,000 people attended the two shows that evening, with crowds gathering two hours before the first performance. The New Jersey Register called the new theatre “…a marvel of beauty, convenience and comfort. Outside and inside it is a veritable and architectural triumph.”

Because of financial struggles and declining movie attendance nationally, Albee was removed from the leadership of the theater. The theater chain was acquired by Keith-Albee-Orpheum in 1928 and then led by Joseph P. Kennedy Sr, father of John F. Kennedy.

The Carlton Theater closed in 1970 after the Strand, the Palace, the Empire, and the Lyric theaters had also closed. In 1973 a significant anonymous donation allowed the Monmouth County Arts Council to preserve and reopen the theater for cultural use, and the theater was renamed the Monmouth Arts Center.

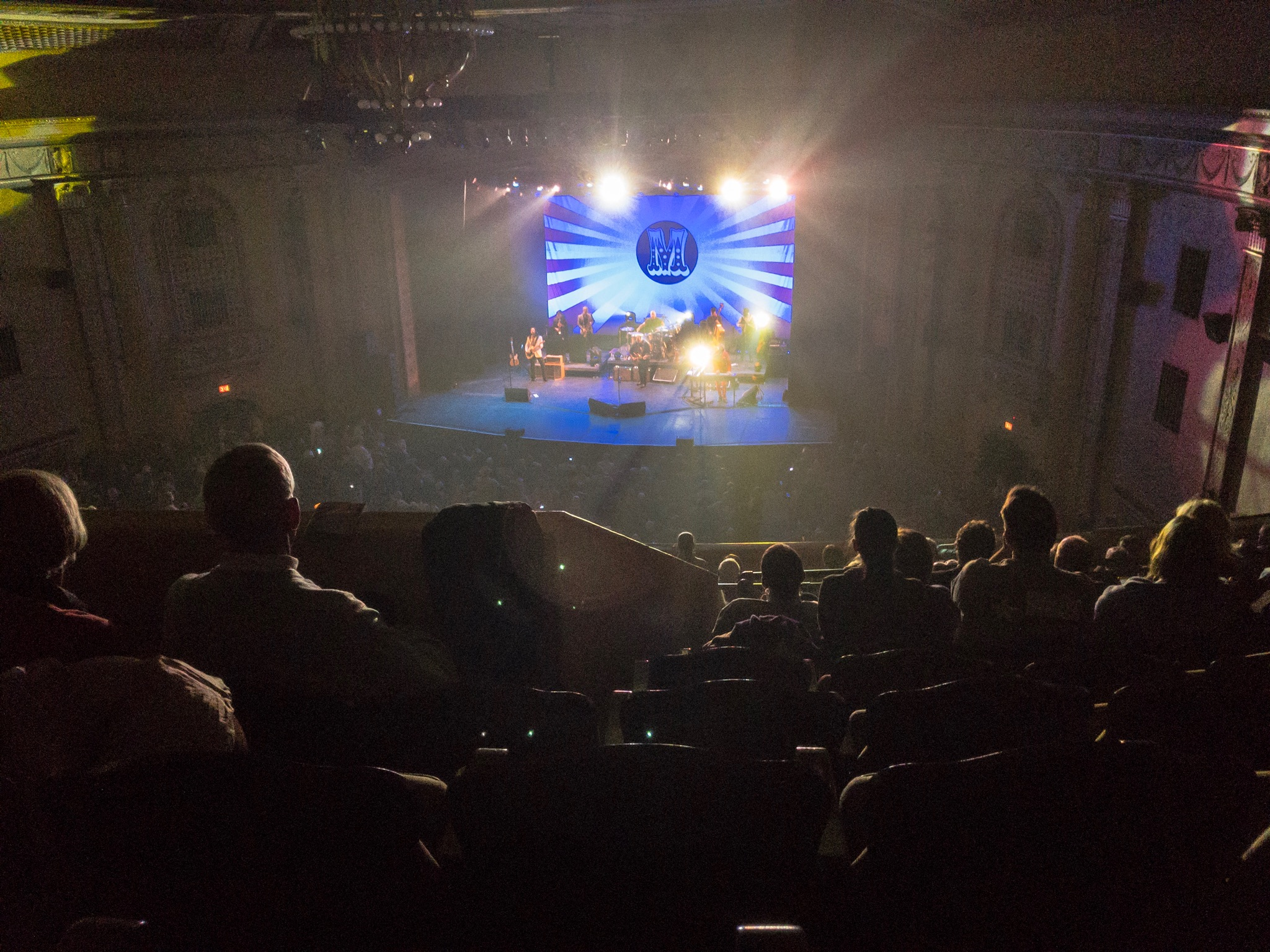
View from the balcony

In 1984 the building was renamed as the Count Basie Theatre, in memorial to William “Count” Basie who had died that year. The Monmouth County Arts Council operated the theater until June 30, 1999, when the not-for-profit corporation Count Basie Theatre, Inc. managed, program, and preserve the theater.

On May 14, 2018, the theater changed its name to Count Basie Center for the Arts as part of a $26 million expansion. Later on in the same year, Hackensack-Meridian Health secured the naming rights to the Center's historic auditorium and renamed it the Hackensack Meridian Health Theatre. In 2020, the Center's second venue, The Vogel, opened with small, 150-person capacity performances on account of the COVID-19 pandemic.

== Shows ==
Besides Count Basie, musicians such as James Brown and Tony Bennett, as well as headline performers such as Al Green, George Carlin, Boz Scaggs, Counting Crows, Olivia Newton-John, Brian Wilson, "Weird Al" Yankovic, Ben E. King, Darlene Love, and Jon Stewart have performed at the theater. Bruce Springsteen has performed at the venue dozens of times, and Jon Bon Jovi has attended and organized many charity concerts there. Springsteen's 2022 documentary "Road Diary" traced his E Street Band's pre-tour rehearsal sessions at The Vogel.

== Community outreach ==
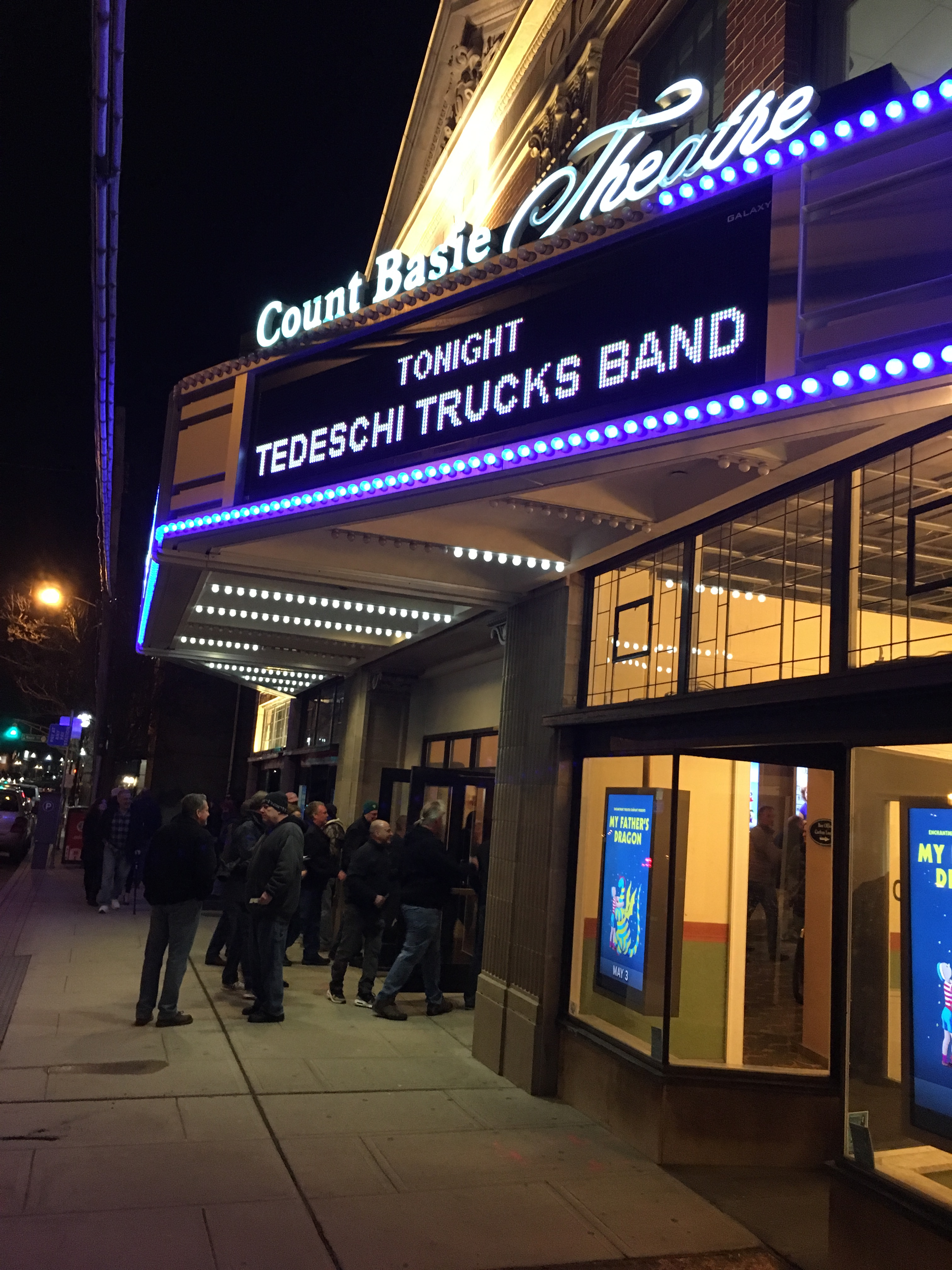
Fans arriving for a concert under the pre-naming rights marquee

The Count Basie Center Turner Academy of the Arts offers professional training courses in performance basics, audition techniques, professional development, and weekend workshops. Notable past participants include singer, songwriter, and record producer, Charlie Puth, Broadway actress Jillian Mueller, The X Factor finalist Cari Fletcher, The Voice runner-up, Jacquie Lee, Steve Vai, keyboardist Michael Arrom, and Conan Gray bassist Christine Meisenhelter.

On May 26, 2006, the organization presented its first annual Basie Awards for excellence in high school theater in Monmouth County, New Jersey. The May 2008 presentations were hosted by Joe Piscopo, while the May 2009 presentations were hosted by Siobhan Fallon Hogan. The 2010 awards were not hosted. The announced host Big Joe Henry, a disk jockey for NJ 101.5 radio, pulled out because of a threat of protests by the New Jersey Education Association, which had disagreed with the radio station for its political views and talks, urging listeners to vote against state spending for education and the arts.

== The building ==
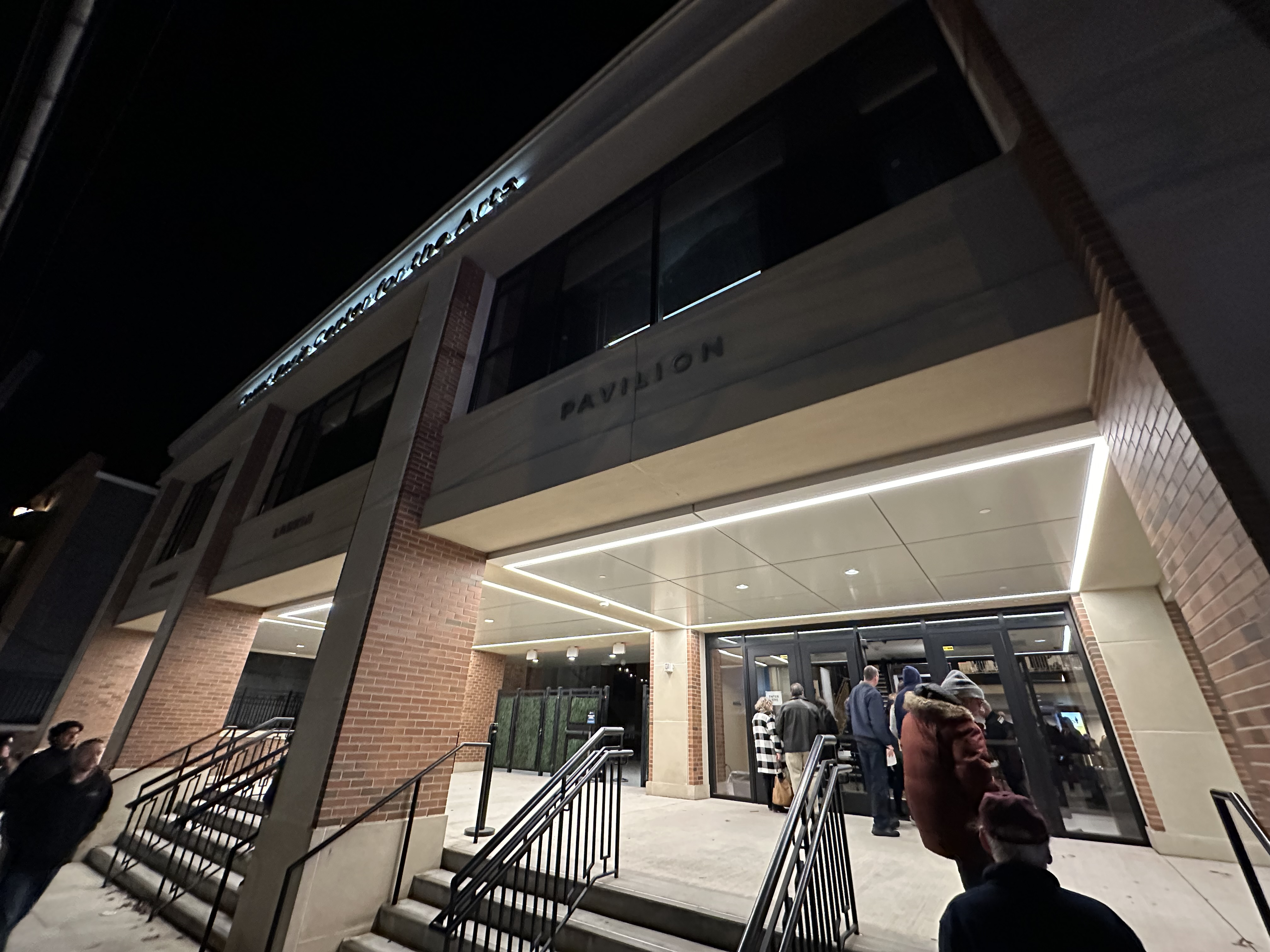
The alternate Stillwell-Larkin Pavilion entrance, 2024

Between 1995 and 2001, the arts council/corporation conducted a series of phased projects to repair and stabilize the infrastructure of the building. Phase 1 of a new renovation series was completed in 2004, replacing the seating with historically accurate seats; adding alabaster lighting fixtures to the auditorium; and restoring and painting a side-panel of plasterwork. Over $1 million has been spent on theater improvements to date, funded by donations and the New Jersey State Council on the Arts in 2010. A $28 million capital campaign was started in 2016 to support an expansion that doubled the Center's footprint, adding a second venue, The Vogel, the Grunin Arts Education Building, a new member lounge, and significant increases in size to the Basie's original theater lobby.

Seating includes 1,008 orchestra, 121 loge, 402 balcony, and 12 wheelchair-accessible platforms. The Vogel holds 800 persons standing.

== Basie Center Cinemas / Basie Center Cinema House ==
In 2020, the center acquired a movie theater which it reopened as the Basie Center Cinemas.. The twin cinema has since been renamed Basie Center Cinema House in a sponsorship deal with OceanFirst Bank.

== The Vogel ==
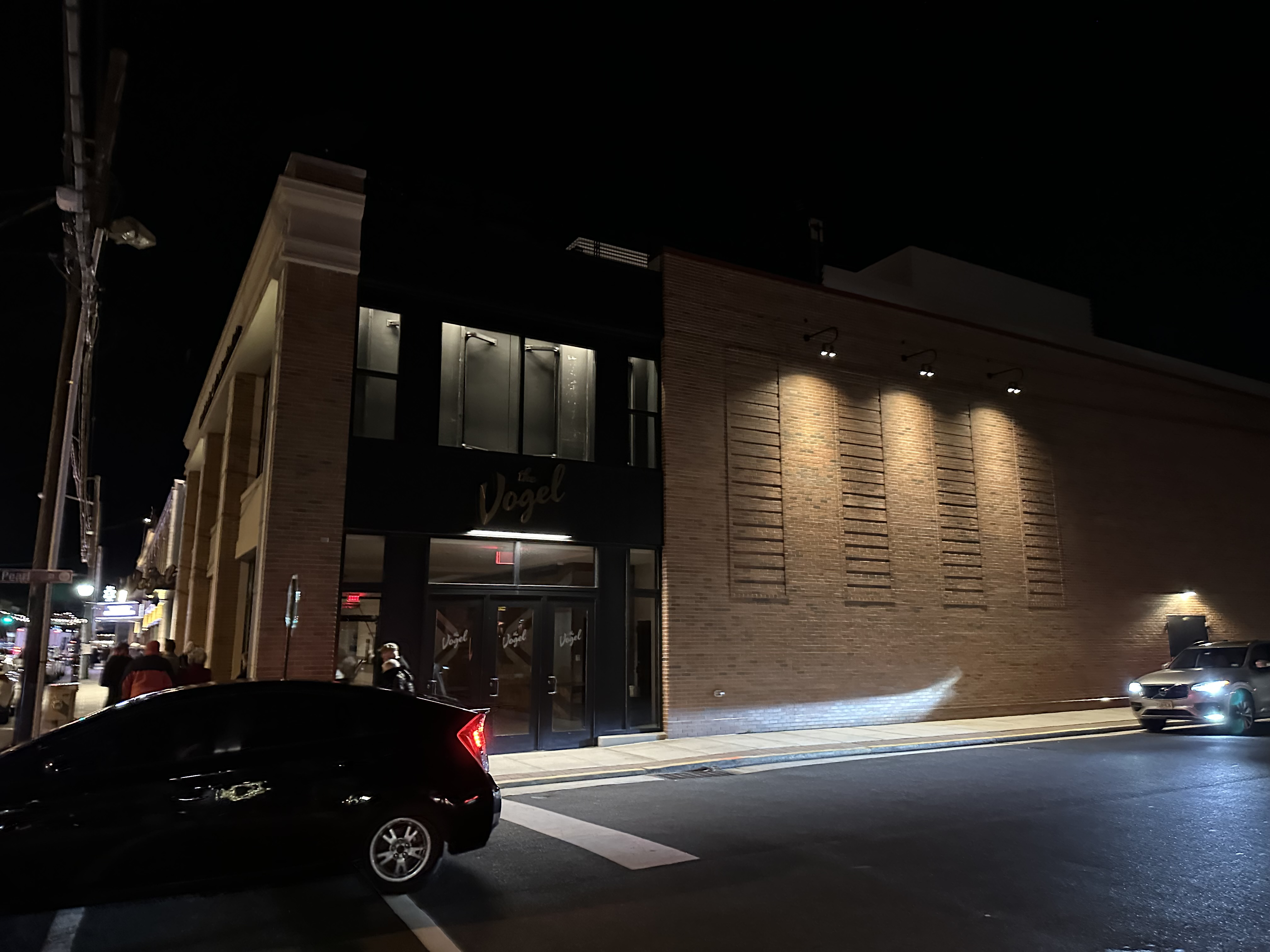
Exterior of The Vogel

Newly built in 2020, the Vogel is a club-sized two-story music venue at the Basie Center with 800 in standing room capacity. It is named for area natives Anne and Sheldon Vogel, the latter of whom oversaw finances at Atlantic Records.

== See also ==
- New Jersey music venues by capacity
- Bruce Springsteen Center for American Music at Monmouth University
