= Splitsville (film) =

2025 film by Michael Angelo Covino

- Theatrical release poster
- Directed by: Michael Angelo Covino
- Written by: Michael Angelo Covino; Kyle Marvin
- Produced by: Emily Korteweg; Michael Angelo Covino; Kyle Marvin; Ryan Heller; Jeff Deutchman; Dakota Johnson; Ro Donnelly; Samantha Racanelli
- Starring: Dakota Johnson; Adria Arjona; Michael Angelo Covino; Kyle Marvin
- Cinematography: Adam Newport-Berra
- Edited by: Sara Shaw
- Music by: David Wingo; Dabney Morris
- Production companies: Neon; Topic Studios; Watch This Ready; TeaTime Pictures
- Distributed by: Neon
- Release dates: May 19, 2025 (Cannes); August 22, 2025 (United States)
- Running time: 104 minutes
- Country: United States
- Language: English
- Box office: $3.4 million

Splitsville is a 2025 American comedy film directed by Michael Angelo Covino, and written by Covino and Kyle Marvin. It stars Dakota Johnson, Adria Arjona, Covino, and Marvin, and follows two couples whose friendship erupts into conflict when the husband of a divorcing couple sleeps with the wife of an open marriage couple.

Splitsville premiered at the Cannes Film Festival on May 19, 2025, and was released in selected theaters in the United States on August 22 by Neon before expanding wide on September 5. It received generally positive reviews from critics.

== Plot ==
While driving on the highway, married couple Carey and Ashley briefly attempt to have sex before observing another couple crash on the side of the road. Carey and Ashley pull over to help, finding the husband barely conscious and the wife ejected from her seat. Despite Ashley's attempts to perform CPR, the wife is pronounced dead. Shaken, Ashley admits to Carey that she wants a divorce and has been unfaithful. An upset Carey flees to the beach house of his best friend, Paul, and his wife, Julie. While consoling Carey, Paul and Julie admit that they are in an open relationship, shocking Carey.

The next day, a confrontation arises when a man accuses Paul and Julie's son, Russ, of stealing his jet ski. With Paul away on a business trip, Carey defends Julie; the situation escalates into a fight until Julie intervenes by breaking a piece of pottery over the accuser's head, knocking him out. That night, Carey and Julie spend time together, bond, and eventually have sex. When Paul returns to the house the next day, Carey tells him about the previous night. Paul becomes furious, leading to a violent argument and fight in the house. Julie and Russ return home during the fight; Julie forces both men to apologize.

Carey later joins Julie and Russ at a carnival, but becomes jealous and aggressive after seeing Brent, the father of a friend of Russ, flirt with Julie. Julie confronts Carey, who admits the sexual encounter meant more to him than expected. Julie urges him to move on. Carey returns home and finds Ashley sleeping with another man. Ashley attempts to convince Carey to leave, but Carey instead suggests entering an open relationship to avoid divorce. Ashley hesitantly agrees after Carey reveals he has already slept with another woman, but does not reveal that it was Julie. Ashley takes on a series of short-term lovers, whom Carey casually befriends and invites to live in the house, much to Ashley's irritation. Now separated from Julie, Paul arrives at Carey and Ashley's apartment to confront him, leading Ashley to learn that the other woman was Julie.

Julie encounters Carey working at Russ's school and informs him that Paul's company has been shut down, its assets are frozen, and it is bankrupt. Julie also admits that she never had a romantic relationship with anyone else during her time with Paul. Carey reveals his growing feelings for Julie, which she reciprocates. Paul witnesses Carey and Julie kiss and passive-aggressively tries to get Carey to admit that they are seeing each other.

After a disciplinary meeting at Russ's school, Julie angrily confronts Paul for getting indicted and taking out loans in Russ's name and spitefully admits to her relationship with Carey. Paul is sent to prison, and after being released, he agrees to sign divorce papers for Julie. Paul and Ashley, who have become frustrated at Carey's relationship with Julie and indifference to her relationships, consider having sex with each other to make their exes jealous, but decide not to go through with it.

At Russ's birthday party, Ashley arrives with her lover Matt, who is performing as a mentalist for the party, while Paul brings a woman closely resembling Julie to provoke her. Ashley attempts to win Carey back, and Carey confesses he was jealous of Ashley's lovers and befriended them to irritate her. Ashley kisses Carey, who insists on remaining friends. Julie privately confronts Paul, who admits that he also never slept with anyone else during their relationship and proposed the open relationship out of insecurity. They reconcile and have sex, which Carey walks in on. Carey, Paul, Ashley, and Julie get into an argument over their situation, which nearly escalates into another fight between Carey and Paul before they are forced to extinguish a fire caused by Russ's birthday candles.

Some time later, Ashley has had a baby and is raising it with Carey, though it is hinted that the biological father might be Matt the Mentalist. Paul and Julie remain separated but maintain a sexual relationship. While all the adults are at Paul and Julie's former beach house, now being used as an Airbnb property, Carey and Paul get into a fight with the Airbnb owner for accusing Russ of stealing his jet ski.

== Cast ==
- Dakota Johnson as Julie
- Adria Arjona as Ashley
- Kyle Marvin as Carey
- Michael Angelo Covino as Paul
- Nicholas Braun as Matt
- David Castañeda as Fede
- O-T Fagbenle as Brent
- Charlie Gillespie as Jackson
- Simon Webster as Russ
- Nahéma Ricci as Antoneta
- Tyrone Benskin as Dr. Ott
- Letitia Brookes as Officer Lank
- Jessika Mathurin as Keri
- Stephen Adekolu as Sutton

== Production ==
In August 2024, it was announced Michael Angelo Covino, Adria Arjona, Dakota Johnson, and Kyle Marvin had joined the cast of the film, with Covino directing from a screenplay he wrote alongside Marvin. Topic Studios and Neon will produce, with Neon distributing. Johnson will serve as a producer under her TeaTime Pictures banner, while Arjona will executive produce with Paul Barbeau. In November 2024, Nicholas Braun, David Castañeda and O-T Fagbenle joined the cast for the film.

Principal photography took place from September to October 2024 in Montreal, Sainte-Julie, Léry and the municipalities of Saint-Sébastien and Sainte-Sabine.

== Release ==
Splitsville had its world premiere at the Cannes Film Festival on May 19, 2025. It was released in selected theaters in the United States on August 22, 2025, before expanding to a wide release on September 5, 2025.

== Reception ==
On the review aggregator website Rotten Tomatoes, 84% of 134 critics' reviews are positive, with an average rating of 7/10. The website's consensus reads: "A classic farce with very modern relationship dynamics, Splitsville spreads the comedic wealth across its well-balanced ensemble." Metacritic, which uses a weighted average, assigned the film a score of 73 out of 100, based on 31 critics, indicating "generally favorable" reviews.

=== Accolades ===
Award	Date of ceremony	Category	Recipient(s)	Result	Ref.
Critics' Choice Awards	January 4, 2026	Best Comedy	Splitsville	Nominated	
Film Independent Spirit Awards	February 15, 2026	Best Screenplay	Michael Angelo Covino and Kyle Marvin	Nominated	
Film Independent Spirit Awards	February 15, 2026	Best Editing	Sara Shaw	Nominated	
Zurich Film Festival	September 25, 2025	Golden Eye Award	Dakota Johnson	Honored	
