= Rotting in the Sun =

2023 film by Sebastián Silva

- Release poster
- Directed by: Sebastián Silva
- Written by: Sebastián Silva; Pedro Peirano
- Produced by: Jacob Wasserman
- Starring: Jordan Firstman; Sebastián Silva; Catalina Saavedra
- Cinematography: Gabriel Diaz Alliende
- Edited by: Gabriel Diaz Alliende; Sofia Subercaseaux; Santiago Cendejas
- Music by: Nascuy Linares
- Production companies: Hidden Content; The Lift Films; Caffeine Post; Icki Eneo Arlo; Spacemaker Productions
- Distributed by: Mubi
- Release dates: January 22, 2023 (Sundance); September 8, 2023 (United States)
- Running time: 109 minutes
- Countries: United States; Mexico
- Languages: English; Spanish

Rotting in the Sun is a 2023 black comedy thriller film directed by Sebastián Silva, who co-wrote the screenplay with Pedro Peirano. It stars Jordan Firstman, Silva, and Catalina Saavedra.

The film had its world premiere at the Sundance Film Festival on January 22, 2023. It was released theatrically in the United States on September 8, 2023, prior to streaming on Mubi on September 15, 2023. It received positive reviews from critics.

== Plot ==
In Mexico City, Sebastián Silva is a depressed, ketamine-addicted artist and filmmaker contemplating suicide by taking pentobarbital. His landlord and friend, Mateo, who is renovating Sebastián's apartment building, jokingly encourages his suicidal ideations. Sebastián's long-suffering housekeeper, Verónica "Vero", is concerned about him and worries that the abusive Mateo might fire her, but Sebastián barely acknowledges her.

Sebastián travels to a gay nude beach, where he meets American comedian and social media influencer Jordan Firstman after nearly drowning. A fan of Sebastián's work, Jordan is convinced that their chance meeting is a sign that the two should work together on Jordan's television project. Jordan invites Sebastián to a party that night, where Jordan films Sebastián snorting ketamine and posts the video on his social media without Sebastián's permission. When Jordan refuses to delete the video, Sebastián angrily admonishes Jordan for his vapidity and uninspired ideas.

Upon returning home, Sebastián has an online meeting with HBO executives, who reject his pitch. He mentions Jordan's project, which piques the executives' interest. He then contacts Jordan and agrees to work together; Jordan insists on moving in with him during their collaboration.

Sebastián asks Vero to help him move a heavy couch from his rooftop storage space for Jordan to use. As they lift the couch, Sebastián becomes distracted by Jordan's incessant phone calls and accidentally falls from the rooftop to his death. Distraught, Vero covers his body and leaves for her niece's quinceañera in a daze, where she confesses the incident to her brother, Lalo. Lalo insists that the police will never believe her, so the two wrap the body in a tarp and hide it in the storage space.

The next day, Jordan arrives at Sebastián's place, but is confused by Sebastián's absence. Thinking Sebastián has ghosted him, Jordan claims on social media that he and Sebastián fell in love and that Sebastián was excited for his project and invited him to stay. However, after finding Sebastián's phone and wallet inside the apartment one night, Jordan grows concerned and urges his followers to help him locate Sebastián.

Upon finding Sebastián's journals, which detail his suicidal thoughts and interest in pentobarbital, Mateo becomes fearful that he may be partially responsible for Sebastián's possible suicide. Knowing that he left several incriminating voice messages on Sebastián's phone joking about the pentobarbital, Mateo expresses his concerns to his wife. Overhearing their conversation, Vero obtains pentobarbital and plants the empty box in Sebastián's trash can.

Mateo sneaks into the apartment and threatens Vero for eavesdropping on him. He steals Sebastián's phone and journals, which Vero witnesses. Later, overwhelmed by stress and guilt, Vero breaks down in tears in front of Jordan, who comforts her, though the two cannot understand one another.

Sebastián's brother, Juan, sees Jordan's posts and arrives in Mexico to help figure out what happened to him. The next day, the police arrive to investigate and find Sebastián's ketamine and the pentobarbital box. Believing the suicide to be confirmed, the police then question Mateo about the drugs, saying that they will need to file a report. Mateo panics and confesses that he took the journals and phone, only increasing suspicion against him. Juan is distraught at his brother's seemingly confirmed death, and Jordan leaves at Mateo's insistence. Mateo fires Vero for complying with the police's drug search.

In the park across the street, using a translation app on his phone, Jordan asks Vero if she witnessed Mateo steal Sebastián's journals and phone. Vero confesses the truth into the phone, expressing remorse for her part in Sebastián's accidental death and hoping his family can find peace. The app poorly translates her confession, leaving Jordan confused as Vero walks away with the bottle of pentobarbital in her hand.

== Cast ==
- Jordan Firstman as Jordan Firstman, a vapid American social media influencer
- Catalina Saavedra as Señora Verónica "Vero", Sebastián's long-suffering housekeeper, employed by Mateo
- Sebastián Silva as Sebastián Silva, a suicidal filmmaker
- Mateo Riestra as Mateo, Sebastián's best friend and landlord
- Martine Gutierrez as Martine, Jordan's vacuous friend
- Alberto Rafael Cortés as Beto, the foreman on the apartment renovation
- Gustavo Melgarejo as Lalo, Vero's brother
- Juan Andrés Silva as Juan, Sebastián's brother

== Production ==
Sebastián Silva was approached by Jordan Firstman while in Mexico, finding him hilarious and wanted to make a satirical film. Silva previously approached Michael Cera to lead the film, but Cera declined due to the graphic sexual content. The film contains unsimulated sex scenes, with Silva stating: "The sex is so graphic that it's a double-edged sword. People, especially Americans, are so scared of genitals. I'm scared a little bit that a lot of people will center on the cocks and talking about cocks when it's just a trait of one of the characters." In January 2023, Robert Pattinson's production company Icki Eneo Arlo boarded the film as a producer.

Principal photography took place almost entirely in the Roma neighborhood of Mexico City, and concluded by December 2021.

== Release ==
The film had its world premiere at the Sundance Film Festival on January 22, 2023. In June 2023, Mubi acquired distribution rights to the film in North and Latin America, the U.K., Ireland, France, Germany, Austria, Italy, Spain, and the Benelux. It was released theatrically in the United States on September 8, 2023, and began streaming globally on Mubi on September 15.

== Reception ==
On the review aggregator website Rotten Tomatoes, 82% of 56 critics' reviews are positive, with an average rating of 6.8/10. The website's consensus reads: "Rotting in the Sun's bold ambition and infectious frenetic energy prove a natural – albeit not universally appealing – fit for its unique flavor of dark mischief." Metacritic, which uses a weighted average, assigned the film a score of 70 out of 100, based on 17 critics, indicating "generally favorable" reviews.
