= Club Kid (film) =

2026 film by Jordan Firstman

- Theatrical release poster
- Directed by: Jordan Firstman
- Written by: Jordan Firstman
- Produced by: Alex Coco; Galen Core; Michael Bloom; Ryan Heller
- Starring: Jordan Firstman; Cara Delevingne; Kirby Howell-Baptiste; Colleen Camp; Vicki Pepperdine; Nigil Whyte; Eldar Isgandarov; Saturn Risin9; Miss Benny; Alaska Riley; Diego Calva; Reggie Absolom
- Cinematography: Adam Newport-Berra
- Edited by: Taylor Levy; Sofia Subercaseaux
- Music by: Cristobal Tapia de Veer
- Production companies: Topic Studios; Rapt Film; Twin Pictures; Stay Gold Features
- Distributed by: A24
- Release dates: May 15, 2026 (Cannes); November 6, 2026 (United States)
- Running time: 121 minutes
- Country: United States
- Language: English
- Box office: $5 million

Club Kid is a 2026 American comedy-drama film written and directed by, and starring Jordan Firstman, in his feature directorial debut. It also stars Cara Delevingne, Kirby Howell-Baptiste, Colleen Camp, Vicki Pepperdine, Nigil Whyte, Eldar Isgandarov, Saturn Risin9, Miss Benny, Alaska Riley, Diego Calva, and Reggie Absolom.

The film premiered in the Un Certain Regard section of the 2026 Cannes Film Festival on May 15, where it was nominated for the Caméra d'Or and the Queer Palm. It received a limited theatrical release in the United States by A24 on November 6, 2026 and received positive reviews from critics.

== Plot ==
Gay party promoter Peter Green lives a hedonistic, drug-fueled lifestyle at various clubs around New York City. At one party, he meets British tourists Leonora and Edison. While Peter is having sex with a man, Leonora joins them, leading to a threesome.

Ten years later, Peter, now in his thirties, is still partying, to the chagrin of his business partner Sophie. When Peter arrives to a business meeting high, Sophie fires him and takes control of his promoting. Edison unexpectedly arrives at Peter's apartment with ten-year-old Arlo, whom she reveals is Peter's son, resulting from his tryst with Leonora. She further explains that Leonora was married to a man named Felix at the time of Arlo's conception, and initially led Felix to believe Arlo was his, though Felix became physically abusive toward both of them when DNA testing revealed this to be false. Leonora has recently committed suicide, and Peter is Arlo's only living relative. Edison leaves Arlo in Peter's care while she ostensibly runs errands, promising to retrieve Arlo in no more than two hours. Peter reluctantly spends the day with Arlo and allows him to sleep in his apartment overnight; the following morning, Peter discovers that Edison has returned to London.

Peter and Arlo bond over their love of club music, and Peter soon begins to adapt to parenthood. He introduces Arlo to his friends, whom Arlo quickly wins over. Peter takes steps to enroll Arlo in school, meets social worker Oscar to help Arlo adjust to his circumstances, and attempts to reconcile with Sophie, whose business is struggling without his help. Encouraged by Peter's friend Saffron, Arlo proves to be a talented DJ and convinces Peter to let him perform at one of his parties. Peter reluctantly agrees, but leaves with Arlo early into the party. Peter and Oscar begin to spend more time together, and a romance forms between them.

Short on funds, Peter resorts to selling drugs again in order to afford Arlo's health insurance. He later promises to let Arlo DJ at another club, but his set is delayed until late into the night. Peter abruptly leaves with him after seeing several people in the crowd overdose, during which the two briefly become separated. Peter retrieves him, but a vindictive Sophie sees them and calls child protective services. She confronts Peter at his apartment the following morning, where she frantically apologizes, claims her actions were the result of a drug-induced rage, promises to get sober, and offers to help him divert CPS' suspicions, but he furiously orders her out. Concerned for Arlo's well-being, CPS removes him from Peter's care and returns him to England. Peter travels to London to appeal, telling the judge that Arlo has inspired him to change his life for the better. Although moved by Peter's testimony, the judge rules that, due to Peter's past criminal record and suspicious money transactions recently found on his Venmo account, Arlo must stay in England, where he will be adopted by Leonora's friend Sharon. She additionally asserts that any communication between Arlo and Peter is strictly prohibited for at least a year, after which the amount of contact permitted between the two will be solely determined by Sharon. A devastated Peter returns to New York alone.

A year later, Peter has stopped partying, works as a bartender, studies psychology, and is still with Oscar. One night, he receives a phone call from Arlo, who is doing well with his new family in England. Sharon promises to allow Peter to visit Arlo in the future. After the call ends, Oscar comforts Peter as he cries. While leaving a bodega, Peter looks through the window of a nearby building and briefly glimpses a party. He stares for a while before walking away.

== Cast ==
- Jordan Firstman as Peter, a party promoter
- Reggie Absolom as Arlo, Peter's son
- Cara Delevingne as Sophie, Peter's business partner
- Diego Calva as Oscar, Arlo's social worker
- Kirby Howell-Baptiste as Edison
- Paris Petitjean as Leonora
- Colleen Camp as Evelyn
- Vicki Pepperdine as Lydia Chestworth
- Nigil Whyte as Devon, Peter's friend
- Eldar Isgandarov as Nicky, an aspiring Queer philosopher from Azerbaijan
- Saturn Risin9 as Saffron
- Miss Benny as Almi
- Alaska Riley as Hana
- Jack Cameron Kay as Dan
- Shygirl as herself
- River Moon as Maurice

== Production ==
Club Kid marks Jordan Firstman's feature directorial debut. It is produced by Alex Coco and Galen Core, with Firstman, Olmo Schnabel, and Daniela Taplin serving as executive producers. Topic Studios produced and financed the project, with Stay Gold acting as co-financier.

Casting includes Firstman, Cara Delevingne, Diego Calva, Miss Benny and newcomer Reggie Absolom, who plays the titular character. Cinematographer Adam Newport-Berra lensed the production on 35mm film.

== Release ==
The cast and crew of Club Kid at the 2026 New York Film Festival

The film had its world premiere at the 79th Cannes Film Festival in the Un Certain Regard section, receiving a 7-minute standing ovation. Shortly after its premiere, the film reportedly received offers from multiple studios including Mubi, Focus Features, Searchlight Pictures, A24, and Black Bear Pictures ranging as high as seven and eight figures; Netflix and Warner Bros. Clockwork also expressed interest in acquiring the film, but dropped out in the early stages of bidding. A few days later, A24 acquired worldwide distribution rights for $17 million.

It had its North American premiere at the 53rd Telluride Film Festival, and its UK premiere at the 70th BFI London Film Festival. It was also selected for the 2026 Toronto International Film Festival, and for the Spotlight Gala section of the 2026 New York Film Festival. It opened the 62nd Chicago International Film Festival on 14 October 2026, and it will compete for the Bronze Horse at the 2026 Stockholm International Film Festival on 14 November 2026.

It received a limited theatrical release in the United States on November 6, 2026. UTA Independent Film Group handled worldwide sales, partnering with Charades on international sales.

== Reception ==
=== Critical response ===
On review aggregator website Rotten Tomatoes, the film holds an approval rating of 99% based on 135 reviews, with an average rating of 8.4/10. The website’s consensus reads: "Jordan Firstman makes an arresting first impression as a writer-director while cementing himself as a compelling leading man in Club Kid, a bittersweet father-son dramedy that injects the classic formula with a modern sensibility." On Metacritic, which uses a weighted average, the film holds a score of 81 out of 100 based on 36 critics, indicating "universal acclaim" reviews.

Wendy Ide of ScreenDaily assessed that Firstman's "depiction of queer party culture is loving, authentic and non-judgemental" and that the film could become a "breakout indie hit".

=== Accolades ===
Award / Festival	Date of ceremony	Category	Recipient(s)	Result	Ref.
Cannes Film Festival	23 May 2026	Un Certain Regard	Jordan Firstman	Nominated	
Cannes Film Festival	23 May 2026	Caméra d'Or	Jordan Firstman	Nominated	
Cannes Film Festival	23 May 2026	Queer Palm	Jordan Firstman	Nominated	
Middleburg Film Festival	18 October 2026	Breakthrough Filmmaker Award	Jordan Firstman	Honored	
SCAD Savannah Film Festival	25 October 2026	Rising Star Director Award	Jordan Firstman	Honored	
Gotham Independent Film Awards	30 November 2026	Best Feature	Jordan Firstman, Michael Bloom, Alex Coco, Galen Core, Ryan Heller	Pending	
Gotham Independent Film Awards	30 November 2026	Breakthrough Director	Jordan Firstman	Pending	
British Independent Film Awards	6 December 2026	Best International Independent Film	Jordan Firstman, Galen Core, Alex Coco	Pending	
