= Bring Your Own Brigade =

2021 American documentary film

- Promotional release poster
- Directed by: Lucy Walker
- Written by: Lucy Walker
- Produced by: Lucy Walker; Holly Becker; Julian Cautherley; Lyn Davis Lear; Martha Mitchell
- Cinematography: Battiste Fenwick; Carmen Delaney; Grant Smith
- Edited by: Christy Denes; Wes Lipman; Dan Oberle
- Production companies: Topic Studios; XTR; Artemis Rising; Tree Tree Tree; Good ‘n Proper Production
- Distributed by: CBSN Films; Paramount Pictures
- Release dates: January 29, 2021 (Sundance); August 6, 2021 (United States)
- Running time: 127 minutes
- Country: United States
- Language: English
- Box office: $13,375

Bring Your Own Brigade is a 2021 American documentary film, written, directed, and produced by Lucy Walker. It follows the aftermath of the Camp Fire (2018), the deadliest and most destructive wildfire in California's history.

The film had its world premiere at the 2021 Sundance Film Festival on January 29, 2021. It was released in a limited release on August 6, 2021, prior to digital streaming on Paramount+ on August 20, 2021, by CBSN Films and Paramount Pictures.

== Synopsis ==
The film follows the Camp Fire and the aftermath, where towns struggle to rebuild and debate on what could have prevented the fires. It also explores the history of uncontrolled fires and causes, including climate change and corporations.

== Production ==
Lucy Walker had been making a short film about the Thomas Fire, which was California's largest wildfire to date at the time. After the Camp Fire and Woolsey Fire, Walker began collecting stories, and decided the material was important for a feature-length film instead, to examine the cause of the fires and the effects of climate change. Walker and her crew filmed with firefighters fighting the fires as they occurred. Other footage of the fires were also given to Walker via AirDrop by residents and responders.

== Release ==
The film had its world premiere at the Sundance Film Festival on January 29, 2021. In June 2021, CBSN acquired U.S. distribution rights to the film. It was released in a limited release on August 6, 2021, prior to digital streaming on Paramount+ on August 20, 2021, by CBSN.

== Reception ==
=== Critical reception ===
Bring Your Own Brigade received positive reviews from film critics. It holds an 89% approval rating on review aggregator website Rotten Tomatoes, based on 27 reviews, with a weighted average of 7.40/10. On Metacritic, the film holds a rating of 81 out of 100, based on 5 critics, indicating "universal acclaim".

Manhola Dargis of The New York Times gave the film a positive review, writing: "In Bring Your Own Brigade," the director Lucy Walker doesn't simply look at the fires; she investigates and tries to understand them. It's a tough, smart, impressive movie, and one of its virtues is that Walker, a British transplant to Los Angeles, doesn't seem to have figured it all out before she started shooting. She comes across as open, curious and rightly concerned, but her approach — the way she looks and listens, and how she shapes the material — gives the movie the quality of discovery. (She's also pleasantly free of the boosterism or the smug hostility that characterizes so much coverage of California.) Specific and universal, harrowing and hopeful, "Bring Your Own Brigade" opens on a world in flames." Bob Strauss of The San Francisco Chronicle also gave the film a positive review, writing: "Mixing in citizens' harrowing cellphone footage and heartbreaking emergency call recordings, Walker's teams immerse us in the flaming terror as few features have before." The New York Times's A.O. Scott saw the film at Sundance and described it as a “relentless forensic examination of some of California’s most horrific recent wildfires. The movie’s first section is an almost unbearable immersion in terror, including 911 calls and cellphone videos that capture death and destruction in real time. Walker, a British transplant sensitive to her outsider status, is driven by an effective mixture of empathy and intellectual curiosity as she tries to understand the ecology, economics and politics of fire. As the narrative shifts from disaster to its aftermath — which is also, inevitably, the prelude to the next round of catastrophe — the scope broadens, even as the camera remains focused on local events and individual stories. In a way that I can't quite explain but that I think will be clear when you see it, "Bring Your Own Brigade" strikes me as one of the early, definitive films about the current pandemic", and added a few days later on his "best of Sundance" wrap-up that the movie was on his list of those he was "most looking forward to seeing again and writing about further. Bring Your Own Brigade: Lucy Walker's documentary on some of the worst recent California wildfires is sprawling and intimate, an issue-driven film that is full of narrative surprise and human detail."
