= Shahmar Alakbarov =

Azerbaijani actor and film director (1943–1992)

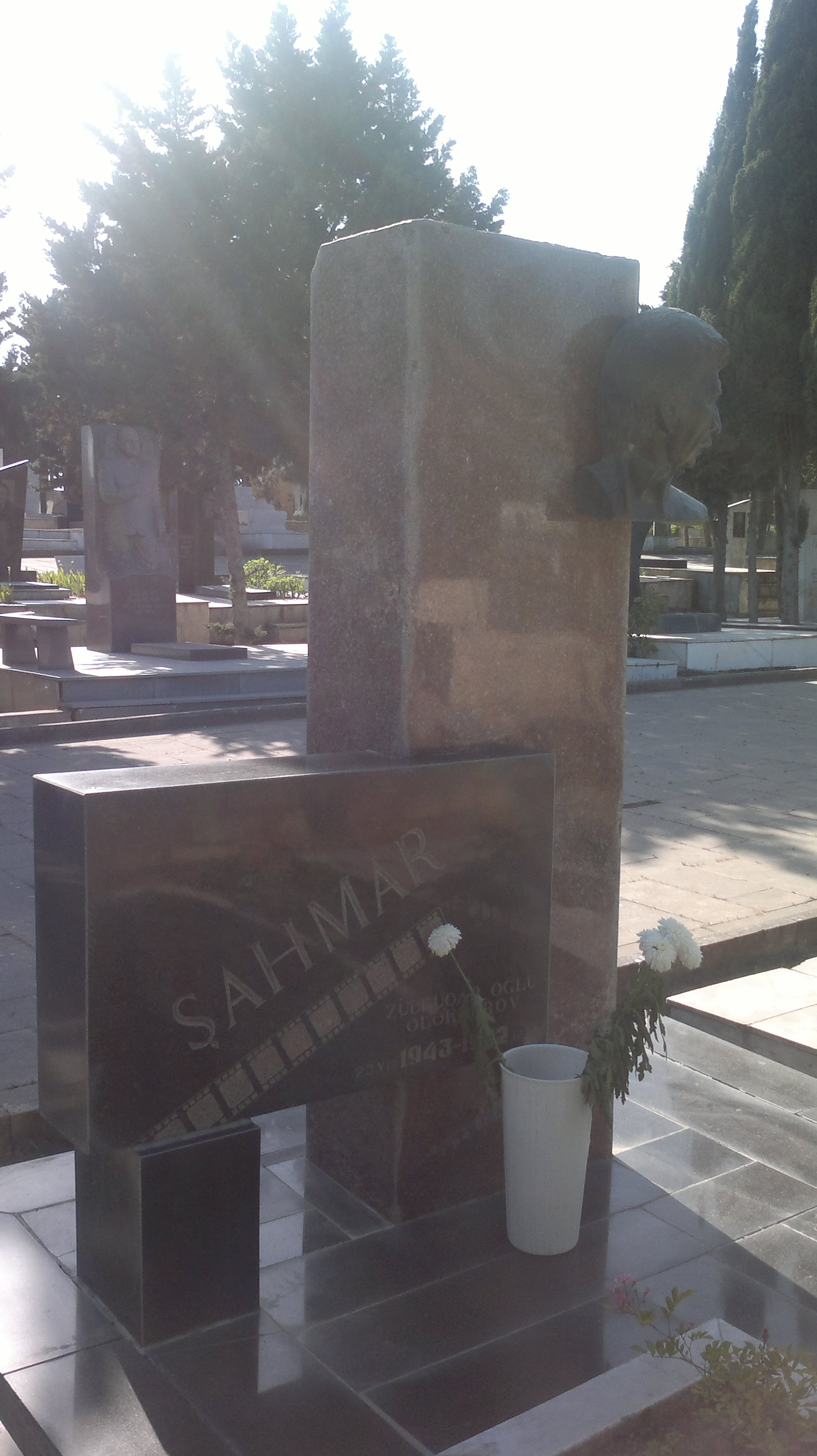
- Born: Şahmar Zülfüqar oğlu Ələkbərov; 23 August 1943; Ganja, Azerbaijan, Soviet Union
- Died: 12 August 1992 (aged 48); Baku, Azerbaijan
- Occupations: Actor; filmmaker; director

Shahmar Zulfugar oglu Alakbarov (Azerbaijani: Şahmar Ələkbərov; (August 23, 1943, Kirovabad – August 12, 1992, Baku) was an Azerbaijani actor, screenwriter, voice actor, narrator, director, and People's Artist of the Azerbaijan SSR (1989). He was also a member of the Communist Party of the Soviet Union since 1978.

His first appearance in theater was in William Shakespeare's play "Lope de Vega". His first role on screen was in the film "Dağlarda döyüş", and his last was "Yük", which was released posthumously. It was based on a script written by Shahmar Alakbarov and focused on the Baku millionaire Agha Musa Naghiyev. The film was shown at the Berlin Film Festival. He worked as both an actor and director at the "Azerbaijanfilm" film studio. After completing his education, he remained at the university as a teaching assistant. Shahmar Alakbarov was also active in television and radio. His first appearance on radio was as the host of the "Ulduz" program. He was the host of the "Molla Nasraddin" radio show and participated in the dubbing of many films. His close ones referred to Shahmar Alakbarov as the "canlı trio."

== Biography ==
=== Early years ===
Shahmar Alakbarov was born on August 23, 1943, in Ganja, Azerbaijan, to Zulfugar Alakbarov who was from Cəbrayil and Izulat khanum who was from Tbilisi. When Alakbarov was 9 years old, his family moved from Ganja to Baku. He finished secondary school at the age of 15. His mother, Izulet Alakbarova, was one of the first graduates of the newly established pedagogical technical school in Azerbaijan and did not want her son to pursue a career on stage.

His wife was the theater scholar Kamila Alakbarova. They had twin daughters, Izulat and Leman. Izulat's husband, Fuad Isgandarov, is Azerbaijan's Ambassador Extraordinary and Plenipotentiary to the Kingdom of Belgium and also the Head of Azerbaijan's Mission to the European Union.

Alakbarov studied acting in Rza Tahmasib's class at the Theater Institute and graduated from the Azerbaijan Institute of Arts in 1964. While still in his third year, he was hired by the Azerbaijan State Academic National Drama Theater. Later, the renowned artist Adil Isgandarov invited him to join the "film acting" studio that he had established at the film studio.

=== Career ===
Shahmar Alakbarov began his acting career with the film Dağlarda Döyüş. The film, directed by Kamil Rustambayov in 1967, was based on the script written by the late writer-journalist Ahmadaga Gurbanov, adapted from his novella "Tikanlı məftillər". Shahmar Alakbarov's character was a private serving in the border troops. Farrukh, the character played by Shahmar, follows the trail of someone who crossed the border illegally. Farrukh eventually captures him, only to discover that this man is his own father, who had fled the homeland during the war.

Alakbarov made an appearance in "Mən ki, gözəl deyildim". The film was directed by Tofiq Tagizadeh.

=== As a Director ===
Alakbarov's health issues no longer allowed him to work as an actor. He co-directed the film "Imtahan" with Gulbeniz Azimzade. The script was written by Anar, based on his novella "Şəhərin yay günləri".

Later, in 1989, Alakbarov directed "Sahilsiz gecə", based on Elchin's novella "Toyuğun diri qalması". Alakbarov struggled with his health during the production. When the film was finished, it faced serious controversy. The reason was that certain aspects of women's lives during wartime were depicted. Women gathered in front of the studio, holding a protest, trying to get the film canceled. Some individuals, who claimed to be "protecting Azerbaijani women," harshly criticized Shahmar Alakbarov's work. "Sahilsiz gecə" was shown only a few times.

For the role of Zibeyda, the protagonist of the film, the director invited Oguldurdu Mammadguliyeva from Turkmenistan. "Sahilsiz gecə" was Shahmar's first independent project.

In 1990, Alakbarov began working on "Qəzəlxan", based on his own script. He invited young actor Logman Karimov for the lead role. Alakbarov decided to split the film into two parts after seeing how much footage there was. In 1991, the film was released. "Qəzəlxan" portrayed various moments from the life and work of Azerbaijani poet Aliagha Vahid. The film also reflected the traditions of the Baku villages and the literary environment of the 20th century.

Alakbarov had written a script that he wanted to direct himself, dedicated to the famous Baku millionaire Agha Musa Nagiyev. After Alakbarov died, director Rovshan Almuradli filmed it in 1995.

=== As an actor ===
Some of Shahmar Alakbarov's roles include: Gazanfar in "My Seven Sons", Son in "Intizar", Iman in "The Last Pass", Arif in "Life Tests Us", Rizvan in "Qızılqaz", one of the boys in "The Boys of Our Street", Azad in "Winds Blow in Baku", Ghatir Mammad in "Ghatir Mammad", Feyzi in "Firangiz", Gunduz Karimli in "The Blow from Behind', Cavidan in "Babak", Nuru in "A Strange Man", Tahir in "Wait for Me", Khalig in "The Old, The Old", Jumshud in "When August Comes", and Ibrahim in "Saddle the Horses".

=== Death ===
During the filming of Firangiz, Alakbarov's tongue was injured by a dentist and later developed into an ulcer due to a cold he caught during filming. In the winter of 1992, his family took him to Hamburg for treatment, where they were unable to cure him.

Upon returning to Baku, Shahmar Alakbarov was admitted to the hospital. His wife, Kamilla Alakbarova, and his twin daughters, Izulat and Leman, stayed with him in the hospital. Shahmar Alakbarov died on August 12, 1992, at the age of 48, due to tongue cancer.

== Heritage ==
Shahmar Alakbarov wrote an autobiography titled "My Memories". It contained the story of his life and a chronicle of Azerbaijani cinema. It was never made into a book after his death.

A special issue of the newspaper "Kino" was dedicated to Shahmar Alakbarov. Published in 1994, this issue included many stories about him, and a portion of his memories about the making of the film "My Seven Sons" was also printed.

On July 17, 2018, his 75th anniversary was celebrated at the Museum Center, organized by the Azerbaijan State Film Fund.

== Awards ==
- Honorary title of "Honored Artist of the Azerbaijan SSR" — December 23, 1976
- Honorary title of "People's Artist of the Azerbaijan SSR" — March 21, 1989
- Award for Best Feature Film — 1991
