= The Climb (2019 film) =

2019 film

- Theatrical release poster
- Directed by: Michael Angelo Covino
- Written by: Michael Angelo Covino; Kyle Marvin
- Produced by: Michael Angelo Covino; Kyle Marvin; Noah Schnapp
- Starring: Kyle Marvin; Michael Angelo Covino; Gayle Rankin; Talia Balsam; George Wendt; Judith Godrèche
- Cinematography: Zach Kuperstein
- Edited by: Sara Shaw
- Music by: Jon Natchez; Martin Mabz; Cédric Cartaut
- Production companies: Topic Studios; Watch this Ready
- Distributed by: Sony Pictures Classics
- Release dates: May 17, 2019 (Cannes); November 13, 2020 (United States)
- Running time: 95 minutes
- Country: United States
- Language: English
- Budget: $3 million
- Box office: $1 million

The Climb is a 2019 American comedy-drama film written, produced by and starring Michael Angelo Covino and Kyle Marvin. Covino also directs, while Gayle Rankin, Talia Balsam, George Wendt, and Judith Godrèche also star. Based on Covino and Marvin's short film of the same name, the plot follows two friends and looks into their lives over several years.

The film had its world premiere at the Cannes Film Festival in the Un Certain Regard section on May 17, 2019. It was released on November 13, 2020, by Sony Pictures Classics, and received positive reviews from critics.

== Plot ==
The film is divided into seven chapters.

1. I'm Sorry

Best friends Mike and Kyle are biking together when Mike breaks the news to Kyle that he's currently sleeping with his fiancé. In the ensuing argument, Mike has a moment of road rage with a motorist that culminates into Mike getting assaulted after chasing the motorist down the road. At the hospital, where Mike is recovering from minor head wounds, Kyle's fiancé, Ava, visits Mike and is confronted by Kyle over her affair. After she tells him that she still loves him, he then asks if she still wants to get married.

2. Let Go

Ava goes on to marry Mike instead, but she unexpectedly dies shortly after. A visibly distraught Mike causes a scene at her funeral which is diffused by Kyle, who came to pay his respects. Mike admits to Kyle that what he did was wrong and that he's a terrible friend. Though Kyle is still angry at Mike, he still consoles him over his loss.

3. Thanks

Sometime later, Kyle, now in better physical shape, is working as a commercial-jingle writer and is dating his former high-school girlfriend, Marissa, with whom he is celebrating Thanksgiving with his family. Though his overprotective, overbearing mother is disapproving of the relationship, she is nonetheless happy for him when he announces his engagement with her. She then reveals to Kyle that she invited Mike to celebrate Christmas with them, noting his having no family of his own to celebrate with.

On Christmas night, a now overweight, alcoholic Mike arrives at Kyle's family's home. Finding his way into the garage, he comes across some old pictures of himself and his old helmet from when he played football in high school. Kyle's mother confronts Mike and tells him that he needs to make amends with Kyle for his selfish actions and stop feeling sorry for himself over how he hurt him. Mike then stumbles into the living room where he passes out drunk.

4. It's Broken

Seeing Mike's worsened state, Kyle invites him to join him and Marissa on their vacation to a ski resort over New Years. After breaking his arm on a difficult slope, Mike is given permission by Kyle to stay with them for the night, the two of them getting drunk together and catching up on their pasts. A frustrated Marissa tells Kyle that Mike is a negative influence on his life and that he needs to cut him out from it. When Marissa goes to bed early, Kyle joins her in the hopes of having sex, but he quickly passes out before she returns from the bathroom. She then goes down to confront Mike about his behavior, and he attempts to kiss her. Though disgusted, she physically pressures him into following through with his advances, convinced that it will finally convince Kyle to break off their friendship for good.

5. Stop It

Mike and Marissa's brother Ronnie plan a surprise ice-fishing bachelor party for Kyle before his impending wedding with Marissa. When Kyle momentarily steps away from the party, Mike approaches him and claims that he slept with Marissa. Kyle, angered once again, surprises Mike by saying that he no longer cares and simply wants to spend his life with someone who cares for him. Mike responds that Marissa doesn't actually care for Kyle as he is and wants to turn him into something she wants him to be, suggesting that he leaves her. At some point, Kyle breaks through a thin patch of ice in the frozen lake, though Mike manages to pull him out.

6. Grow Up

Kyle has since cut all ties with Mike, who is lonelier than ever. On the day of Kyle and Marissa's wedding, Mike crashes the ceremony and objects to their union, instigating a small brawl in the church between him and members of both Kyle and Marissa's families. During the confrontation, Marissa loudly declares that she's pregnant and that she's adamant about getting married. Upon learning this, the priest refuses to wed them over concerns that their child is pressuring them into a potentially doomed marriage and advises them to wait until after the child is born.

7. Fine

About a year later, Mike is now working at a bicycle shop/café, where a now-married Kyle and Marissa visit him with their newly born son Otis, the former of whom still misses Mike.

Several years later, Kyle and Marissa have decided to divorce. Kyle lives close to Marissa to stay in touch with their son and maintains his friendship with Mike, whom Otis affectionately refers to as his “uncle.” The three go on a bike ride together and Mike encourages Otis to remove his training wheels. He initially falls, but eventually rides, to Mike and Kyle's encouragement.

== Cast ==
- Michael Angelo Covino as Mike
- Kyle Marvin as Kyle
- Gayle Rankin as Marissa
- Judith Godrèche as Ava
- Talia Balsam as Suzi
- George Wendt as Jim
- Daniella Covino as Dani

== Release ==
The film had its world premiere at the Cannes Film Festival in the Un Certain Regard section on May 17, 2019. A week later, Sony Pictures Classics acquired worldwide distribution rights outside France and German-speaking Europe to the film. It went on to screen at the Telluride Film Festival on August 30, 2019, the Toronto International Film Festival on September 6, 2019, and the Sundance Film Festival on January 24, 2020.

It was scheduled to be released on March 20, 2020. Previously, Sony Pictures Classics stated they would go ahead with the release of the film despite the COVID-19 pandemic. However, it was later pulled from the schedule, and rescheduled to July 17, 2020. It was then delayed to October 9, 2020, and again to November 13, 2020.

== Reception ==
=== Box office ===
In its domestic opening weekend, the film grossed $103,500 from 408 theaters.

=== Critical response ===
On review aggregator Rotten Tomatoes the film holds an approval rating of 90% based on 121 reviews, with an average rating of 7.8/10. The website's critics consensus reads: "The Climb uses the complicated bond between two friends to dissect male friendships in an engaging -- and frequently funny -- fashion." Metacritic reports a weighted average score of 82 out of 100, based on 26 critics, indicating "universal acclaim".

== See also ==
- List of films about bicycles and cycling
