= It's Never Over, Jeff Buckley =

2025 American documentary film

- Theatrical release poster
- Directed by: Amy Berg
- Produced by: Amy Berg; Ryan Heller; Christine Connor; Mandy Chang; Jennie Bedusa; Matthew Roozen
- Cinematography: Alex Takats; Curren Sheldon; Wolfgang Held; Jenna Rosher
- Edited by: Brian A. Kates; Stacy Goldate
- Production companies: Topic Studios; Disarming Films; Fremantle; Plan B Entertainment
- Distributed by: Magnolia Pictures; HBO Documentary Films
- Release dates: January 24, 2025 (Sundance); August 8, 2025
- Running time: 107 minutes
- Country: United States
- Language: English
- Box office: $1.7 million

It's Never Over, Jeff Buckley is a 2025 American documentary film, directed and produced by Amy Berg. It follows the life and career of musician Jeff Buckley.

It had its world premiere at the Sundance Film Festival on January 24, 2025, and was released on August 8, 2025, by Magnolia Pictures.

== Premise ==
The film explores the life and career of Jeff Buckley, incorporating voice messages and previously unseen footage. It also features interviews with Buckley's mother Mary Guibert, as well as friends, ex-girlfriends and musicians such as Rebecca Moore, Joan Wasser, Ben Harper, Susan Silver, Michele Anthony, Aimee Mann and Chris Cornell.

== Production ==
Initially, Brad Pitt approached Jeff Buckley's mother, Mary Guibert, about making a film revolving around Buckley. Guibert agreed, but remained skeptical of Pitt starring as her son. The two kept in touch about a potential project. Amy Berg then approached Guibert about making a film about Buckley, however, Guibert was skeptical of Berg transferring from non-fiction filmmaking to narrative. Berg decided to instead make a documentary, with Guibert granting Berg access to archive, and Pitt executive producing alongside helping digitize and preserve Buckley's belongings.

== Release ==
The film had its world premiere at the Sundance Film Festival on January 24, 2025. In June 2025, Magnolia Pictures and HBO Documentary Films acquired distribution rights to the film, and set it for an August 8, 2025, theatrical release, prior to a broadcast on HBO later in the year.

The film was screened in the non-competitive 'Freestyle – Arts' section of the 20th Rome Film Festival in October 2025.

== Reception ==
On the review aggregator website Rotten Tomatoes, 98% of 46 critics' reviews are positive. The website's consensus reads: "A comprehensive and graceful retrospective of an artist who was gone far too soon, It's Never Over, Jeff Buckley will leave audiences celebrating what was while reflecting on what could have been." Metacritic, which uses a weighted average, assigned the film a score of 72 out of 100, based on 17 critics, indicating "generally favorable" reviews.

The film received a nomination for Best Documentary Feature at the 9th Astra Film Awards.
