= Brook Arts Center =

- U.S. National Register of Historic Places
- New Jersey Register of Historic Places
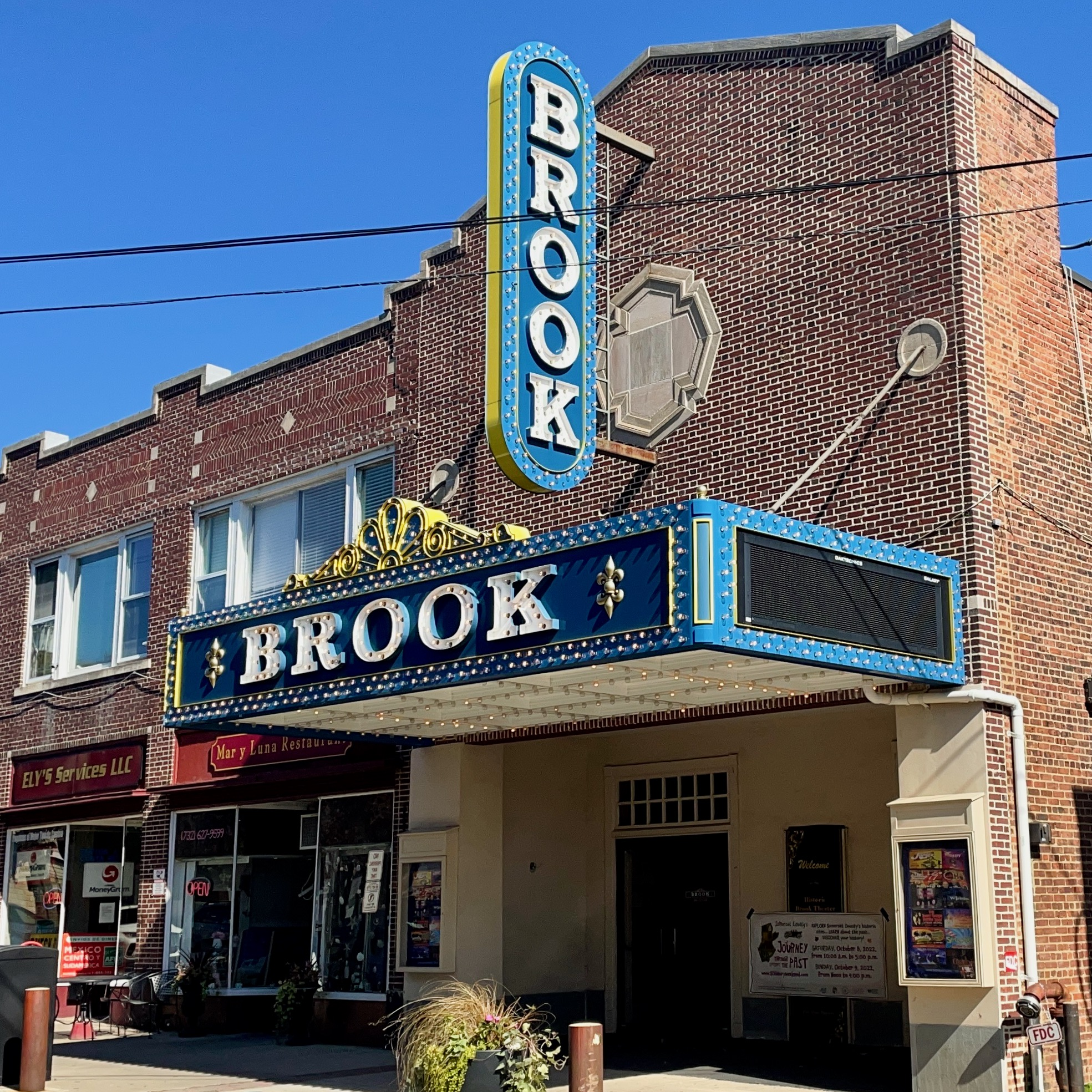
- Brook Arts Center in 2022

- Location within Somerset County, New Jersey Location within New Jersey Location within the United States
- Location: 10 Hamilton Street, Bound Brook, New Jersey
- Coordinates: 40°33′43″N 74°31′48″W
- Built: 1927
- Built by: Alexander Morecraft
- Architect: William E. Lehman
- NRHP reference No.: 14000190
- NJRHP No.: 4114

Significant dates
- Added to NRHP: May 5, 2014
- Designated NJRHP: February 27, 2014

The Brook Arts Center, formerly Brook Theatre, is a historic theater located at 10 Hamilton Street in Bound Brook of Somerset County, New Jersey. It was added to the National Register of Historic Places on May 5, 2014, for its significance in entertainment and performing arts.

== History and description ==
The theater was designed by William E. Lehman. It was built by Alexander Morecraft, a Bound Brook resident, and had a grand opening on January 19, 1927. Originally a 1,300-seat vaudeville house, the theater was the hub of a theater district serving surrounding towns and counties. As motion pictures took over in the 1930s, the theater became a performing arts center and first-run movie house, operating until the floods of 1999 and 2007 required extensive rebuilding. The theater is notable for its contributions to Bound Brook and remains the only surviving vaudeville theater in the county.

The theater offers plays, bands, dance, silent film and classic movies year round. The venue is a rental house for plays, film shoots, and various other events. The Brook Arts Center is also home of the Brook Orchestra and Brook Arts Center Community Players.

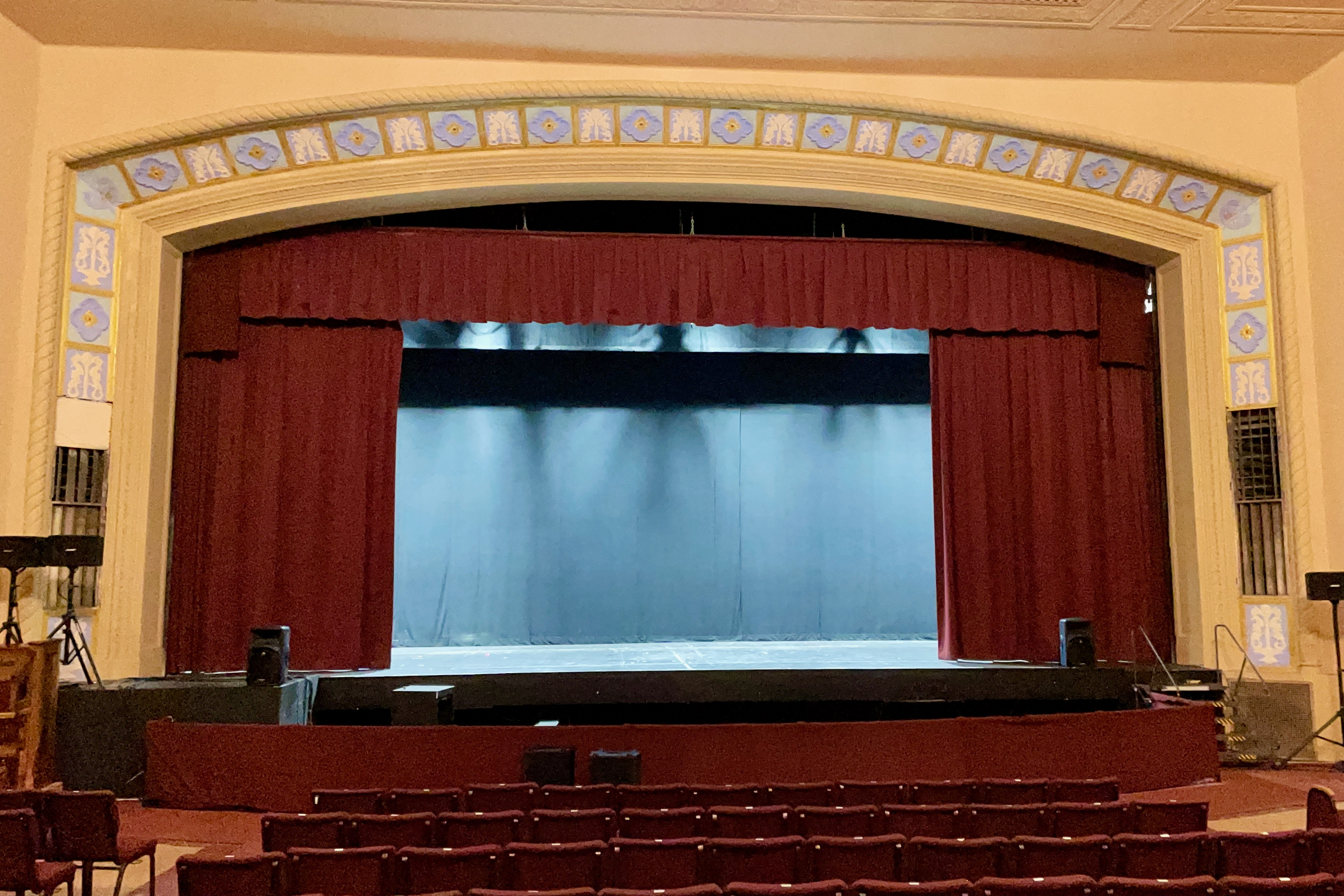
Stage and proscenium arch

== See also ==
- National Register of Historic Places listings in Somerset County, New Jersey
