= Hunter Gatherer =

2016 American film by Josh Locy

- Theatrical release poster
- Directed by: Josh Locy
- Written by: Josh Locy
- Produced by: Michael Angelo Covino; April Lamb; Sara Murphy; Isaiah Smallman
- Starring: Andre Royo; George Sample III; Kellee Stewart; Ashley Wilkerson; Kevin Jackson; Antonio D. Charity; Celestial; Alexis DeLaRosa; Jeannetta Arnette
- Cinematography: Jon Aguirresarobe
- Edited by: Adam Robinson
- Music by: Keegan DeWitt
- Production companies: Secret Intimacies; Mama Bear Studios; Unbundled Underground; Rough House Pictures
- Distributed by: The Orchard
- Release dates: March 12, 2016 (SXSW); November 16, 2016 (United States)
- Running time: 85 minutes
- Country: United States
- Language: English

Hunter Gatherer is a 2016 American drama film written and directed by Josh Locy. The film stars Andre Royo, George Sample III, Kellee Stewart, Ashley Wilkerson, Kevin Jackson, Antonio D. Charity, Celestial, Alexis DeLaRosa, and Jeannetta Arnette. The film was released on November 16, 2016, by The Orchard.

== Cast ==
- Andre Royo as Ashley Douglas
- George Sample III as Jeremy Pittman
- Kellee Stewart as Nat
- Ashley Wilkerson as Linda
- Kevin Jackson as Ray
- Antonio D. Charity as Dwayne
- Celestial as Ashley's Mom
- Alexis DeLaRosa as Carlos
- Jeannetta Arnette as Dr. Merton
- Karina Bonnefil as Santa
- Mysti Bluee as Dottie
- Derrick Brooks as Todd

== Release ==
The film premiered at South by Southwest on March 12, 2016. The film was released on November 16, 2016, by The Orchard.

== See also ==
- List of black films of the 2010s
