= Jordan Firstman =

American writer and comedian (born 1991)

- Firstman in 2026
- Born: July 8, 1991 (age 35); Long Island, New York, U.S.
- Occupations: Actor; writer; comedian
- Years active: 2014–present
- Notable work: Men Don't Whisper; Ms. Marvel

Jordan Firstman (born July 8, 1991) is an American actor, filmmaker, comedian, and singer living in Los Angeles, California. He is known for starring in the thriller film Rotting in the Sun (2023) and for writing, directing, and starring in the comedy-drama film Club Kid (2026). Firstman rose to prominence for his short skits, called Impressions, shared on Instagram Live in 2020, during the COVID-19 pandemic.

== Early life ==
Jordan Firstman was born on Long Island, New York to American Jewish parents. He grew up in Northport, New York.

== Career ==
In 2016, at a time when he was a writer for the television series Search Party, Firstman wrote and starred in Call Your Father, a satirical short film exploring the ups-and-downs of an intergenerational gay couple. The following year, he and co-writer Charles Rogers created Men Don't Whisper, a comedic short film about an "emasculated" gay couple who try to regain their masculinity by seducing several women. The film was screened at Sundance and South by Southwest, and was selected as a Vimeo Staff Pick Premiere.

In early 2020, Firstman wrote an ode to gay representation in film, sung by the Gay Men's Chorus of Los Angeles, as well as Laura Dern at the 2020 Independent Spirit Awards. During the COVID-19 pandemic, Firstman began posting videos to Instagram of his various impersonations and impressions, such as "the town gossip who-has-no-more-gossip-during-quarantine", "Summer 2020", "Banana Bread's Publicist" and "all the clothes people are not wearing right now". His comedic skits have been met with positive response from fans and celebrities alike, including Ariana Grande, Katy Perry, and Chrissy Teigen. Actress Ruby McCollister has said of Firstman's comedy: "You're putting a home base to the meme" (by incorporating video, text and creator, all at once). For Thom Browne's SS2021 fashion show, which was set during the future 2132 Olympics on the Moon, Firstman and model Grace Mahary roleplayed as commentators as runway models walked, held at the Los Angeles Coliseum (an Art Deco relic, where the 1932 Summer Olympics were held).

In 2022, he appeared in the Marvel Cinematic Universe series Ms. Marvel, which aired on Disney+.

In 2023, Sebastián Silva premiered his film Rotting in the Sun at the Sundance Film Festival. Firstman was cast in the lead role as a fictionalized version of himself. The film was notable for featuring unsimulated sex, with Firstman himself engaging in oral sex. Rotting in the Sun was nonetheless praised for its portrayal of an existential crisis as a "riotous blast".

In 2024, he appeared as a guest on the Grindr-created YouTube podcast Who's the A**hole, hosted by RuPaul's Drag Race alum and entertainer Katya Zamolodchikova. Firstman starred in FX's English Teacher as Malcolm until the series' cancellation in 2025. The TV series was nominated for multiple Critics Choice Awards in the Comedy Series category.

In 2025, he signed a recording contract with Capitol Records. He released his debut comedy album, Secrets, on April 11, 2025, based on confessions his followers sent to his Instagram account. It features guest appearances by Rachel Sennott, Suki Waterhouse, Julia Fox, Rufus Wainwright, Laundry Day, Jimmy Pop, and his mother. The same year, Firstman also began starring in Sennott's HBO comedy series I Love LA as Charlie.

In November 2025, it was announced that Firstman would make his feature directorial debut with Club Kid, a New York–set film which he also wrote and starred in. The film follows a nightclub promoter whose life changes after discovering he has a son he was previously unaware of. The film premiered at the 2026 Cannes Film Festival on May 15, 2026, playing in the Un Certain Regard section. In May 2026, it was announced that, after a "highly competitive bidding war", A24 had won global distribution rights to Club Kid.

== Personal life ==
Firstman is gay.

== Filmography ==
=== Film ===
Year	Title	Role	Director	Writer	Notes	Ref.
2015	Daddy	Hot man	No	No		
2016	Call Your Father	Josh	Yes	Yes	Short film	
2017	Men Don't Whisper	Peyton	Yes	Yes	Short film	
2023	Rotting in the Sun	Jordan Firstman	No	No		
2023	You People	Danny	No	No		
2026	Club Kid	Peter	Yes	Yes	Also executive producer	

=== Television ===
Year	Title	Role	Notes	Ref.
2014	Real Life	Casting director	Episode: "The Audition"	
2014	Beards	Jonathan	Episode: "BEARDS: Noah & Anya"	
2015	EastSiders	Mitchell	Episode: "Sex Therapy"	
2016	Gay of Thrones		Episode: "Dickbreaker"	
2016–2017	Search Party	Luke	Recurring role; also writer	
2017	Last Meal	Brian the Zombie	Episode: "Logan Lynn"	
2019	This Close	Richard Broomson (voice)	Episode: "Three's Company"	
2019	Tales from the Closet	Himself	Episode: "Straight-Acting"	
2021	Cinema Toast	Sebastian (voice)	Also writer	
2021	Miracle Workers	Kaya	Episode: "Fording the River"	
2022	Ms. Marvel	Mr. Wilson	Recurring role	
2023	Dave	John-Paul	Episode: "Met Gala"	
2024–2025	English Teacher	Malcolm	Recurring role	
2025–present	I Love LA	Charlie Cohen	Main role	
2026	Hacks	Himself	Episode: "D'Amazing Race"	

==== As producer ====
Year	Title	Notes	Ref.
2020	Big Mouth	Consulting producer (10 episodes)	
