= Topic Studios =

American film production company

- Industry: Film industry
- Founded: 2017; 9 years ago
- Headquarters: United States
- Area served: United States
- Parent: First Look Media
- Website: topicstudios.com

Topic Studios is an American film production company owned by First Look Media. The company is known for producing films Leave No Trace (2018), Luce (2019), The Climb (2019), and The Mauritanian (2021). The company also produces television shows including Love Fraud (2020) and 100 Foot Wave (2021).

== History ==
In June 2017, it was announced First Look Media would be launching a film and television production and distribution company called Topic Studios. The company's first film was Roman J. Israel, Esq. directed by Dan Gilroy, starring Denzel Washington and released in November 2017, by Columbia Pictures.

In December 2020, Topic Studios signed a first look deal with The Population, a production company owned by Mynette Louie. In February 2021, Studios also signed a first look deal with Loveless Media.

In January 2024, Topic Studios' television division shuttered as part of layoffs and restructuring.

== Filmography ==
=== 2010s ===
Release date	Title	Notes
November 17, 2017	Roman J. Israel, Esq.	distributed by Sony Pictures Releasing
June 29, 2018	Leave No Trace	distributed by Bleecker Street
October 12, 2018	The Oath	co-distributed with Roadside Attractions
June 7, 2019	XY Chelsea	distributed by Showtime
August 2, 2019	Luce	co-distributed with Neon
October 4, 2019	Wrinkles the Clown	distributed by Magnet Releasing
October 18, 2019	The Laundromat	distributed by Netflix
November 15, 2019	The Report	distributed by Amazon Studios

=== 2020s ===
Release date	Title	Notes
July 8, 2020	Mucho Mucho Amor: The Legend of Walter Mercado	distributed by Netflix
July 31, 2020	The Fight	co-distributed with Magnolia Pictures
August 7, 2020	A Thousand Cuts	distributed by PBS Distribution
November 13, 2020	The Climb	distributed by Sony Pictures Classics
February 12, 2021	The Mauritanian	distributed by STXfilms
May 21, 2021	Dream Horse	co-distributed with Bleecker Street
August 6, 2021	Bring Your Own Brigade	distributed by CBSN and Paramount Pictures
September 17, 2021	The Nowhere Inn	distributed by IFC Films
November 5, 2021	Spencer	co-distributed with Neon
January 14, 2022	Italian Studies	distributed by Magnolia Pictures
March 4, 2022	Dear Mr. Brody	distributed by Discovery+ and Greenwich Entertainment
November 23, 2022	Nanny	distributed by Amazon Studios and Blumhouse Television
January 27, 2023	Infinity Pool	distributed by Neon
July 14, 2023	Theater Camp	distributed by Searchlight Pictures
August 4, 2023	Shortcomings	distributed by Sony Pictures Classics
November 1, 2024	A Real Pain	distributed by Searchlight Pictures
July 25, 2025	Folktales	distributed by Magnolia Pictures
August 8, 2025	It's Never Over, Jeff Buckley	distributed by Magnolia Pictures
August 22, 2025	Splitsville	distributed by Neon
April 17, 2026	Mother Mary	distributed by A24
October 23, 2026	Wicker	distributed by Black Bear Pictures
November 6, 2026	Club Kid	distributed by A24

=== Upcoming ===
Release date	Title	Notes
TBA	Scorn	
