= Orlando Martínez Howley =

Dominican Republic journalist (1944–1975)

- Born: September 23, 1944; Las Matas de Farfán, Dominican Republic
- Died: March 17, 1975 (aged 30); Santo Domingo, Dominican Republic
- Education: Universidad Autónoma de Santo Domingo
- Occupations: Journalist and columnist
- Employer(s): Ahora! (magazine) and El Nacional
- Known for: his column "Microscope" and his opposing consistent criticism of the Balaguer regime
- Political party: Dominican Communist Party

Orlando Martínez Howley (September 23, 1944 – March 17, 1975) was a left-wing journalist and member of the Communist Party of the Dominican Republic who was a critic of President Joaquín Balaguer. He was ordered to be killed by the then president in 1975, and in 2000, four men were given 30-year jail sentences in connection with the killing. Orlando Martínez has become a symbol of freedom of expression in the Dominican Republic.

== Personal ==
Orlando Martínez was born in Las Matas de Farfán in the Dominican Republic, in 1944. His father Luis Mariano Martinez and mother Adriana Howley had five boys, including Orlando, and his brothers were Bélgica, Túcides (deceased), Nelson, and Sergio. He was educated at the Universidad Autónoma de Santo Domingo, which was close to where he was killed. His mother persisted in pushing for the reopening of her son's case after his assassination.

== Career ==
Orlando Martínez was the editor of Revista Ahora and a columnist for the daily paper El Nacional. His column, "Microscope," in the paper was one of the most widely read items of the period because it consistently brought to light crimes and corruption within the ruling Balaguer regime and the military. One of the last articles he wrote defended the rights of the artist Silvano Lora (1934-2003).

== Death ==
Santo Domingo de Guzmán is the capital of the Dominican Republic.

Orlando Martínez had written articles critical of the president. He was assassinated in Santo Domingo de Guzmán on 17 March 1975 while President Joaquín Balaguer was in office. He was shot on the street called José Contreras near the Universidad Autónoma de Santo Domingo. The murder weapon was a .38-caliber revolver that was identified as belonging to Mariano Cabrera Duran, who was later extradited from the United States to the Dominican Republic.

== Investigation ==
Former President Joaquin Balaguer always claimed to have known who carried out the killing of Orlando Martínez but refused to tell the judicial authorities. He opted to not tell who they were and just wrote a "blank page" in his autobiography, Memories of a Courtesan in the Era of Trujillo, supposedly leaving for posterity the knowledge of who the killers were.

Despite some initial arrests and a reward for information offered by Balaguer the case remained in limbo until President Leonel Fernandez, elected in 1996, ordered the case reopened. In 1998, Mariano Cabrera Duran, owner of a small Bronx Liquor store, was arrested by federal marshals and returned to the Dominican Republic. Duran was connected to the murder weapon that was used to kill Martínez.

The orders for the assassination came from Gen. Isidoro Martínez, who died of cancer in 2001. Those tried and convicted for carrying out the killing were retired Gen. Antonio Pou Castro, ex-Sergeant Mariano Duran and the two paramilitaries, Rafael Lluberes Ricart and Luis Emilio De la Rosa Veras. In 2000, the four men were given 30-year jail sentences in connection with the killing and Rafael Lluberes Ricart had been identified as the one who shot Martínez. The convicted had all been identified in 1975 in connection with the assassination.

== Context ==
Orlando Martínez's assassination was not the only murder case due to political affiliation during the Balaguer 12-year regime. The journalist José Enrique Piera Puig was killed five years before Martínez was murdered. The murders of Amín Abel Hasbún, leftist-leader Otto Morales, and Maximiliano Gomez were all cases that occurred during this time. Throughout Balaguer's rule, it is estimated that he ordered the murders of more than 2,000 workers, students, and intellectuals combined.

== Impact ==
Thirty years after Orlando Martínez's death, journalists from the Dominican Republic continue to write about him. He was known for his strong stances against the ruling regime and after his murder, he became a symbol of freedom of expression in the Dominican Republic.

== Reactions ==
President Leonel Fernandez reopened the case in 1996 after he was elected. After the sentence was handed down by the judge, Fernandez said, "The imposition of sanctions against those that justice has found guilty is still not sufficient to make up for the pain caused by an act of this magnitude."

The Inter American Press Association (SIP) followed the Martínez through until its resolution.

== Memorials ==
His home is now a public memorial. Remembrances are also held on St. Patrick's Days in his honor.

== Books ==
- Leila Roldán, Archivo de instrucción: el caso Orlando Martínez Dominican Republic: Stanley Graficas & Associates, 1999.

== See also ==
- Rafael Molina Morillo
