= Mario Álvarez Dugan =

Mario Virgilio Álvarez Dugan (9 April 1931 – 13 December 2008) was a Dominican editor and journalist who served as the head editor of Hoy, a newspaper published in his hometown of Santo Domingo, from 1988 until his death in 2008.

Álvarez Dugan began his career as a sports commentator and announcer. He became the general editor of Deportes in 1958. Additionally, he founded and managed two now defunct Dominican equestrian magazines, Handicap and El Enllave.

Álvarez Dugan joined the staff of the El Caribe in 1966, later serving as the newspaper's chief editor during the 1970s. He also worked within the management of the El Nacional, but left that particular paper in 1988 to become editor of Hoy. He remained editor of Hoy until his death in 2008.

He was inducted into the Dominican sports hall of fame in 1993. Álvarez Dugan authored several sports related books on administrative corruption in athletics, sports anecdotes and the history of baseball in the Dominican Republic.

Álvarez Dugan died at a hospital in Santo Domingo, just days after he was admitted suffering from heart problems. He was 77 years old. He was survived by his wife, Altagracia Matilde Soto Peguero, and the couple's three children, including Dominican table tennis player, Mario Virgilio Álvarez Soto.

Leonel Fernández, the President of the Dominican Republic, attended Álvarez Dugan's funeral. Fernández paid tribute to him saying, "Don Mario Álvarez Dugan contributed to influence the spirit of Dominicans as a society," and said that he influenced public opinion with balance, good sense and wisdom.
