= Rhina Espaillat =

Dominican-American poet

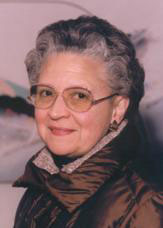
- Born: January 20, 1932 (age 94); Santo Domingo, Dominican Republic
- Education: Hunter College; Queens College
- Occupation: Poet
- Website: www.rhinapespaillat.com

Rhina Polonia Espaillat (born January 20, 1932, Santo Domingo, Dominican Republic) is a bilingual Dominican-American poet and translator who is affiliated with the literary movement known as New Formalism in American poetry. She has published eleven collections of poetry. Her work has been included in many popular anthologies, including The Heath Introduction to Poetry (Heath 2000); The Muse Strikes Back (Story Line Press 1997); and In Other Words: Literature by Latinas of the U.S. (Arte Publico Press 1994).

Born in Santo Domingo into an upper class family of mixed Afro-Dominican, Spanish, French, and Arawak descent, Espaillat grew up during World War II in the Hell's Kitchen neighborhood of New York City after her family became refugees from the Dominican Government of caudillo Rafael Trujillo. She had her first poetry published by the Ladies' Home Journal in November 1947. At the age of 16, she became the youngest ever member of the Poetry Society of America, which altered its rules to admit her. Following her 1952 interracial marriage to sculptor and labor union organizer Alfred Moskowitz, however, Espaillat drifted away from contributing to American poetry until their children had grown up and left home.

Her original poetry contains many sonnets describing her family in domestic settings, which she calls "snapshots". She is also well-known for writing poetry that captures the beauty of daily routine, as well as poems which ironically and humorously retell stories from both the Christian Bible and Classical mythology.

Furthermore, even though Espaillat grew up in a time when, "the expectation that one should overcome any non-British ancestral origins, still held sway as a prerequisite to entering the sphere of genuine Americanness", Espaillat's poetry also expresses pride in being a Latina, in her identity as a feminist who is also a loving and happy wife and mother, and in American patriotism rooted in gratitude for her status as a political refugee who has built a family and a successful and rewarding life for herself in the United States.

Espaillat is especially well-known for her literary translations of the Christian poetry of St. John of the Cross (1542–1591) from Castilian Spanish into American English and which appeared in the literary journal First Things, and for similarly translating the greatest works from the literary canon of both Spanish and Latin American poetry. Espaillat has also published acclaimed translations from American English into Spanish of the poems of both Robert Frost and Richard Wilbur. Espaillat's renderings of the poetry of Robert Frost have particularly been praised for her ability to find completely accurate Spanish equivalents for the Yankee poet's many uses of rural New England slang terms.

In 2023, Espaillat's translations of the Christian poetry by the Archpriest of Hita, Dafydd ap Gwilym, Marko Marulić, Bedřich Bridel, and Gaspar Aquino de Belén were edited and published for the first time by Burl Horniachek in the poetry anthology To Heaven's Rim: The Kingdom Poets Book of World Christian Poetry. Espaillat's translation of a Middle Welsh poem by Dafydd ap Gwilym for the book was made in collaboration with former Archbishop of Canterbury Rowan Williams.

Following the 2020 Presidential Election, President-elect of the United States Joe Biden received a joint open letter and petition signed by more than 70 eminent American poets, who urged him to select Espaillat to read her poetry at Biden's Presidential Inauguration. Biden ultimately chose Amanda Gorman instead.

== Life ==
=== Family background ===
Espaillat is of mixed Afro-Dominican, Spanish, French, and Arawak descent. She is the daughter of Carlos Manuel Homero Espaillat Brache, a Dominican diplomatic attaché, and Dulce María Batista. Her aunt Rhina Espaillat Brache founded the first ballet institute of La Vega. Espaillat is also the grandniece and god-daughter of Dominican diplomat Rafael Brache. Through her great-uncle, Espaillat is second-cousin of Democratic Party chairman Tom Perez. Espaillat is fourth-cousin once-removed of Adriano Espaillat and great-great-great-grand-niece of Dominican President Ulises Espaillat, and is descended from the French immigrant François Espeillac.

=== Early life ===
Rhina Espaillat was born in the Dominican Republic's capital of Santo Domingo, which Caudillo Rafael Trujillo had recently renamed Cuidad Trujillo, on January 20, 1932. Shortly after her birth, Espaillat's parents returned with their infant daughter to their hometown of La Vega, which had been founded by Christopher Columbus in 1494.

While growing up in La Vega, the Espaillat family lived near an historic fort on Independence Avenue, surrounded by a large community of extended family and friends who shared their dedication to art, music, and poetry.

Espaillat was often taken to visit relatives in her mother's hometown of Jarabacoa, which is now a popular resort.

Espaillat began composing poetry in Spanish when she was only 4-years of age. Her first poems were written down by her grandmother, who told Espaillat that her poems were all wonderful and that she was a poet. None of those first poems, however, still survive.

In 1937, a five-year old Espaillat accompanied her parent on a diplomatic mission to Washington, D.C.. At the time, Espaillat's great-uncle and god-father, Rafael Brache, headed the Dominican delegation and Espaillat's father was the legation's secretary.

Rafael Brache had supported the 1930 coup d'état that had brought Rafael Trujillo to power. Furthermore, Brache's duties ever since becoming Ambassador to the United States in 1934 had mainly involved defending Trujillo's public reputation, which was suffering due to reports of political assassinations, human rights abuses, and the censorship of the press.

In 1937, however, Trujillo issued orders to the Dominican Army that resulted in the genocidal Parsley massacre of an estimated 20,000 Haitians in the Dominican Republic. In response, a horrified Rafael Brache wrote a letter to Trujillo which denounced the massacre and said, "he could no longer be associated with a government that had committed such a terrible criminal act."

According to Espaillat, "we did learn that the dictator was absolutely furious when he received it." At that time, however, there was little or no organized opposition to Trujillo in the Dominican Republic and, in November 1937, a majority vote by the National Congress declared Rafael Brache and three other critics of the massacre to be, "unworthy Dominicans", and, "enemies of the fatherland". According to Espaillat's biographer Leslie Monsour, Brache and his nephew, Espaillat's father, knew that they, "would face a dire punishment – at best imprisonment – and the lives of other members of the family would be endangered if the two men returned to their country." By that time, however, "reports of Trujillo's oppression and brutality had reached international notoriety", and the United States Federal Government willingly granted political asylum to Rafael Brache, his nephew, and their dependents. Both men and their families resettled in New York City.

During these events, Espaillat's mother suffered a miscarriage while pregnant with a son. After recovering, Dulce Maria, knowing that life in New York City would be difficult, decided that her daughter would be better looked after by relatives in their homeland. In response, Dulce Maria made the high risk decision to secretly return to the Dominican Republic. During the visit, Dulce Maria left Rhina to be cared for by her paternal grandmother in La Vega. Dulce Maria then visited her own mother and siblings in Jarabacoa, said her last goodbyes, collected her sewing machine, and returned to the United States without attracting the attention of Trujillo's police.

For the next two years, Espaillat was raised by her paternal grandmother and aunts in La Vega, where Spanish language poetry was always being recited out loud. Espaillat's grandmother also played Spanish classical guitar. Espaillat has since stated that, "those experiences made me much more of an ear poet than an eye poet".

In 1939, however, Espaillat's parents felt more settled in the United States and Rhina joined them in a New York City apartment on West Forty-Ninth Street in Hell's Kitchen.

=== Refugee ===
As a young child, Espaillat quickly learned American English and adapted to the cosmopolitan atmosphere of wartime Manhattan, but she missed her extended family in the Dominican Republic.

In a 2017 interview, Espaillat recalled, "I think that as an immigrant, you create a family, and in New York, it’s interesting to do that. Everybody’s there. I was surrounded by Jewish kids in the school, and Italian kids, and Germans, and even Japanese who were having a rough time at that point, because the war was starting. So I ran into people who were, as my father said, just like us. They’re running from somebody. My father was a political exile. He explained that Jewish people were running from Europe because there were bad things happening. And I said, 'You mean they’re like us?' He said, 'Yes. The world is full of people like us, because the world is full of people just like Rafael Trujillo.'"

In addition to closely following world events, Espaillat's parents were also, "avid readers of literature and history in their native Spanish", and, from the age of five onwards, Espaillat was listening to her father's almost constant poetry recitations, which, "ran the gamut of Spanish-language verse from Spain's Golden Age to the major poets of modern Latin America". In later years, she would recall hearing the verse of Teresa of Ávila, St. John of the Cross, Sor Juana Inés de la Cruz, José Santos Chocano, and Federico García Lorca.

As a child, Espaillat was required by her father to speak only Castilian Spanish inside the family apartment. She was also required to speak both English and Spanish with correct pronunciation and grammar. Furthermore, she was strictly forbidden to mix both languages together. "Don Homero" Espaillat Brache viewed English and Spanish as, "world languages", which deserved the respect of being written and spoken properly. Even though Espaillat found this very frustrating as a child and would even, "end up crying", she has expressed gratitude to her father for making her, "truly bilingual."

While attending elementary school at P.S. 94, Espaillat would often visit the public library next door during her lunch break. During a, "guided trespass", into the adult section of the library, an enthusiastic Espaillat came upon a copy of the 1942 poetry anthology, A Treasury of Great Poems English and American, in which Louis Untermeyer collected the literary canon of poetry in English from the Anglo-Saxon invasion of Britain to the interwar period of the 20th century. When Rhina asked her parents to buy her a copy, the Espaillats were, "delighted by their daughter's passion for a compilation of poems rather than dolls or dresses", but they could not afford the book's asking price of $3.75, which was a sizeable amount of money for a refugee family in 1943. In response, Don Homero Espaillat Brache asked for help from his daughter's godfather, Rafael Brache, who bought a copy of the book as a 1943 Christmas gift for his god-daughter.

Espaillat has described receiving the gift of Untermeyer's book as, "another turning point in my life." She adds, "I ate it up! It's such a marvellous book, and it became my poetic Bible."

Decades later, the book remains one of Espaillat's most cherished possessions. In a June 2014 email to her biographers, Espaillat described the volume as, "bandaged with tape but miraculously still in one piece and still at work, like a brave old veteran."

Even though she began composing poetry in English when she was only 8-years old, Espaillat's first surviving poem in English, First Snowfall, was written when she was only ten years old.

=== Early success ===
When she was only fifteen, Espaillat's high school English teacher, Catherine Haydon Jacobs, took an interest in her poetry and, without Espaillat's knowledge, submitted them to The Ladies Home Journal. To Espaillat's shock, she received a letter from the magazine's editor saying that three of her poems had been accepted for publication. Espaillat later recalled that, as she read the editor's letter, she thought, "This can't be happening! This only happens to poets!"

Following her November 1947 debut, Espaillat's poetry regularly appeared in The Ladies' Home Journal and, eventually, in a British magazine as well. The resulting exposure caused her to receive a large number of fan letters.

Catherine Jacobs also sent Espaillat's poems to the Poetry Society of America, which changed its rules to accept Espaillat, who was then only 16-years old, as the Poetry Society's youngest ever member.

When she was seventeen, Espaillat received a fan letter from Shabani, in Southern Rhodesia, from an admirer who had translated one of her poems into Afrikaans and who was requesting permission to publish the translation. Espaillat received similar fan letters from poetry lovers throughout the United States, as well as in Manila, Berlin, Rio de Janeiro, and London.

During the same era, Espaillat also acted as a literary mentor to a young girl who had written to her from the American Zone of Occupied Germany, where the girl's father was serving with the United States military. This ultimately led, according to Espaillat's biographers, "to a close and enduring friendship."

=== Mid-life ===
After majoring in English and minoring in Latin and the Humanities, Espaillat graduated from Hunter College with her Bachelor of Arts in 1953. Following her 1952 marriage to Alfred Moskowitz, however, Espaillat drifted for a long time out of contact with the Poetry Society of America while working as a public school teacher and raising her two sons in Flushing, Queens. During her long absence from American poetry, Espaillat relied heavily upon the mentorship and encouragement of Alfred Dorn, who would go on to become one of the founders of New Formalism.

Following the CIA-backed assassination of Rafael Trujillo on May 30, 1961, and U.S. President John F. Kennedy's use of coercive diplomacy to effect regime change in the Dominican Republic on November 19, 1961, Espaillat's relatives at last felt able to safely travel to the United States and visit Espaillat, her husband, and their two sons in Flushing, Queens. Espaillat's visiting cousins charmed her many local friends and neighbors, as she later described in the poem Translation.

Also following Trujillo's assassination, Espaillat's great-uncle, Rafael Brache, his wife, and several of their sons returned permanently to the Dominican Republic. Espaillat's parents, though, did not. Espaillat later recalled, "I was married with children and my parents didn't want to leave us. They'd also made many close friends in the United States; and, of course, many of the people back home had already died, including both of my grandmothers. I believe that it's very common in immigrant communities to have powerful longings for home, but by 1961, my parents' lives were centered in the U.S."

In 1964, Espaillat completed her M.S.E. at Queens College.

Along with her husband, Espaillat taught English in the New York City public school system, including Jamaica High School in Queens, for many years. In 1990, she chose early retirement and moved with her husband to Newburyport, Massachusetts, to be closer to their two sons and their grandchildren.Their foster son, who had joined the family in 1968, remained in New York City with his wife and stepchildren. Espaillat later recalled that she had enjoyed teaching, but missed poetry deeply. For this reason, her husband had told her, "Why don't you choose early retirement and give more time to what you really love?" In Newburyport, Espaillat began writing poetry almost immediately and has since led the Powow River Poets, the local chapter of the Massachusetts State Poetry Society, which has become a New Formalist chapter due to Espaillat's leadership and influence.

=== Return to poetry ===
Espaillat attended the first West Chester University Poetry Conference, which was founded by New Formalist poets Michael Peich and Dana Gioia, in 1995 and later recalled, "I was the only Hispanic there, but I realized that these people were open to everything, that their one interest was the craft. If you could bring something from another culture, they were open to it."

Espaillat subsequently took charge of "teaching the French Forms and the forms of repetition," but also made sure to teach classes in "the Spanish and Hispanic examples of the forms" such as the décima and the ovillejo."

Due to Espaillat's teaching and encouragement, the ovillejo, particularly, has become very popular among younger New Formalists writing in English. While being interviewed for a book about her life, Espaillat gleefully commented, "On the internet and in the stratosphere, everybody loves it."

Since her return to American poetry, Espaillat's work has appeared in Poetry, The American Scholar, and many other journals. She is a two-time winner of the Howard Nemerov Sonnet Award, and she judged the 2012 Contest. Her second poetry collection, Where Horizons Go, was published by Truman State University Press in conjunction with her selection for the 1998 T. S. Eliot Prize. Her 2001 collection, Rehearsing Absence, was published by University of Evansville Press after she won the Richard Wilbur Award.

== Literary accomplishments ==
=== Literary translator ===
Espaillat writes poetry in both English and Spanish, and has translated into Spanish and published her translations of the poetry of both Robert Frost and Richard Wilbur.

Of her translations of Frost, Espaillat once said, "...something like The Witch of Coos seems to be written in a kind of New Hampshirese that's very hard to translate into Spanish. It's too idiosyncratic. But I've been pleased with the shorter lyrics I've done. In the past, I've only seen a few translations of Frost into Spanish, and I don't care for any of them. One of them actually translated Frost into free verse, which I don't think is appropriate at all, and I'm sure that Frost was turning in his grave."

In return for her translations of Frost, which preserve, "their rhyme schemes and metrical ingenuity while at the same time coming up with equivalents for their linguistic idiosyncrasies", Espaillat has been awarded the Tree at My Window Award by the Robert Frost Foundation of Lawrence, Massachusetts. Furthermore, ten of Espaillat's translations have been placed along the Robert Frost Trail at Lawrence Common.

According to biographers Nancy Kang and Silvio Torres-Saillant, Espaillat, "has also accrued a solid track record as English translator of Spanish and Latin American verse from across diverse historical periods."

Espaillat has produced and published English translations of the verse of Dominican poets Quiterio Berroa y Canelo, Manuel del Cabral, and Héctor Incháustegui Cabral.

She has also translated poetry written in Spanish by fellow Dominican-Americans Juan Matos, César Sánchez Beras, Diógenes Abréu, and Dagoberto López.

From other Latin American countries, Espaillat has translated the poetry of Miguel de Guevara, Sor Juana Inés de la Cruz, Manuel González Prada, Rafael Arévalo Martínez, Gabriela Mistral, Vicente Huidobro, and Alfonsina Storni.

From Spain, Espaillat has translated the verse of Saint John of the Cross, Gabriel Bocángel, Gabriel García de Tassara, Miguel de Unamuno, and Miguel Hernández.

Espaillat has also translated the poetry of Antero de Quental from Portuguese and the verse of Blas de Otero from Catalan.

From other languages, Espaillat has translated into English the verse of Charles of Orléans from Middle French, Dafydd ap Gwilym from Middle Welsh, Croatian national poet Marko Marulić from Renaissance Latin, Luís de Camões from Portuguese, Bedřich Bridel from Czech, and Filipino poet Gaspar Aquino de Belén from Tagalog.

During an interview with William Baer, Espaillat said, "I can't imagine a world without translation because we'd have no Bible, no Homer, and no Virgil. All of our libraries would shrink down to a single room. So we desperately need translation, but it's crucial for the translator to face the fact that he's not going to get it all. There are going to be losses, which he should try to keep to a minimum, but he can never flatter himself that he's really bringing the poem into another language because it simply can't be done. I think the translator needs to begin with humility. As far as the actual process goes, I think a translator first needs to understand the poem as much as he can, try to get under the author's skin, and see if he can reconstruct the thought process of the original author. The primary job of the translator is to carry the poem from one language to the other with as little damage as possible. Personally, I enjoy the challenge very much, even though I'm never fully satisfied."

=== Latina writer ===
Even though Espaillat grew up in a time when, "the expectation that one should overcome any non-British ancestral origins, still held sway as a prerequisite to entering the sphere of genuine Americanness", she opposes the idea of complete assimilation rooted in the English only movement and instead favors encouraging bilingualism among Americans from immigrant families. In an interview with William Baer, she said, "Whenever I speak to Hispanic groups, I tell the young people to make sure they hold onto their Spanish, and keep it clean, and constantly increase their vocabulary, just as they're doing with English. Then I encourage them and say, 'Now, since you know two languages, for heaven's sake, translate! We need you! Both languages need you to bridge the gap.'"

Espaillat has also cited the music of the Spanish classical guitar, which she first heard played by her grandmother as a child, as a major influence on her poetry. She has particularly cited the music of composer Joaquín Rodrigo as a vitally important influence.

Despite Espaillat's use of that very idiom in her poem, Bilingual/Bilingüe, she also opposes the use of Spanglish, saying, "The language of Cervantes, of Neruda, of Darío and Borges and Sor Juana, and, yes, of Don Pedro Mir, deserves better treatment; and so does the language of Shakespeare, and Walt Whitman, Emily Dickinson and Robert Frost."

== Personal life ==
Of her interracial marriage to Alfred Moskowitz, Espaillat once said, "I met him at the wedding of my best friend, Mimi, and his best friend, Harry. I was still at Hunter College, in my junior year, and we ended up sitting at the same table at the wedding on Thanksgiving Day in 1951. And we started talking, then dancing, and – I know this sounds like madness – he proposed five weeks later on New Year's Eve, and we were married in June of 1952." At the time of their wedding, Rhina Espaillat was only 21-years old.

The son of Romanian Jewish immigrants with left-wing views, Moskowitz was an industrial arts teacher, labor union organizer, and sculptor. He had grown up in The Bronx while speaking Yiddish in the home and had fought as a 19-year-old G.I. during the Battle of the Bulge in 1944. According to Esaillat's biographers Nancy Kang and Silvio Torres-Saillant, "Moskowitz brought to the household a sense of stark realism as experienced by U.S. military personnel during World War II. This was a time when many young Americans took to the front with a profound desire to fight for freedom and justice against regimes that endorsed tyranny and oppression."

During their many subsequent decades together, the Moskowitzes had, "many conversations", with each other. "Conversations", according to Espaillat, "when we'd consider how we'd come from different backgrounds, different cultures, even different burroughs, and yet, ultimately, we came together so quickly. And sometimes we'd talk about how various small turns in our earlier lives would have altered everything, and that we would have ended up living completely different lives, with different spouses, different children, and so on – which is quite a frightening thought for two people who are happy together. There were so many earlier ifs that could have changed things. If I'd gone back to Oswego instead of going to school in New York City, if I'd taken that scholarship in Ohio instead of staying at Hunter College, and so on. In life, we never know when the important things are going to happen. When Alfred and I first met at that wedding, neither one of us was expecting anything major to happen. But it did."

Following their wedding, Alfred and Rhina Moskowitz moved into an apartment in the racially mixed neighborhood of Flushing, Queens. Both continued teaching in New York City's public school system.

The Moskowitzes were also very active and influential members of the United Federation of Teachers from the time it was first being created. Espaillat later recalled, "Our house was strike headquarters in our district more than once. The experience left both of us feeling strongly loyal to the labor movement everywhere, to workers in every field and across racial, ethnic, gender, and all other lines, as necessary to justice and the protection of workers' rights."

Alfred Moskowitz deferred to his wife's fame within American poetry by allowing her to continue publishing under her maiden name in literary magazines. In legal paperwork, however, Espaillat would always sign her name as Mrs. Alfred Moskowitz.

The Moskowitzes also participated in the American Civil Rights Movement and in protests against U.S. involvement in the Vietnam War.

They remained together until Moskowitz died in February 2016; the couple had three sons.

In a 2017 interview, Espaillat commented, "I think that outside the fabric that we belong in, that we’re part of, we really don’t mean very much. As a matter of fact, now that I lost my husband last February, I’m having a hard time feeling like a whole person, because it had been sixty-three years of a really good, happy marriage, and once you’ve had that kind of thing, you feel: 'Where’s the rest of me? He’s gone, suddenly there’s nobody on the other pillow.' I don’t think that feminism consists in thinking of yourself as nobody’s anything. I think it consists in precisely being somebody’s something and counting. Whatever doors you open for yourself are fine, but I think what really matters is whatever doors you succeed in opening for other people. Whatever good you do in the world makes you a person. I don’t think that existing for yourself alone is all that valuable. So maybe I’m a backward person. I guess I’m an unfeminist in that sense, but I don’t care."

== Current status ==
While being interviewed by New Formalist poet and literary critic William Baer, Espaillat expressed an intense dislike of political poetry, "I don't think poetry should be asked to change political systems or rectify the economy, even though poets can certainly express how they feel about such things. Poets can, of course, write about their fears and hopes and wishes, but I don't think that poetry should be used for political sloganeering. I personally don't care for that kind of poetry, regardless of which side of the political spectrum it comes from."

According to Leslie Monsour, "If an issue of social injustice is encountered, she approaches it through ironic observation, clever conceit, or worldly disillusionment, in keeping with her lifelong attraction to the Baroque and Metaphysical poets."

In a 2017 interview, Espaillat sharply criticized sitting U.S. President Donald Trump on the one hand, and the excesses of both identity politics and Intersectionality on the other, for causing the political polarization of the American people. Espaillat commented, "There are a lot of rights to defend that other people have not yet been given, that are their rights by nature. And I think that if we isolate ourselves into little groups fighting for mine, and for yours, and for yours and for yours, we’re not going to make it. I think we need to become a whole tapestry of people who are fighting for all rights, including the rights for White working class people who are being underpaid and overworked and who have not been taught what they should have been taught. I don’t think we can afford to throw rocks at anybody, even the people who look like the enemy right now, because they’re not the enemy. They’re just … other people."

Following the 2020 Presidential Election, President-elect of the United States Joe Biden received a petition signed by more than 70 poets from Massachusetts to California, who urged him to select Espaillat to read her poetry at Biden's Presidential Inauguration.

According to her biographer Silvio Torres-Saillant of Syracuse University, "This is a no-brainer to me... She may be the one American poet with the most capricious, inclusive vision of empathy and compassion. You can even see that when she speaks about our problematic American history. She talks about being the offspring of a slaver and a slave and can place each one in his or her historical context and their circumstances."

In an interview before Amanda Gorman was selected instead, Espaillat commented, "Would I want to do it? Do chickens have lips?... We were political exiles and this country gave us a home. This country saved us from a lot of grief. It has given me everything that I really love in the world. It has given me a wonderful husband, wonderful children who were born here, a career that I have loved all of my life, and friends that I probably don’t deserve. So I have a number of things that I need to be grateful for. There are some powerful feelings that I have about this country."

In a January 2021 interview, Espaillat praised senior members of the Republican Party for having urged Donald Trump in vain to concede the 2020 Presidential Election, "I am very sorry for the mistakes he has made because I am not a one-party person. I don't believe that any democracy can survive with one party alone. We need something to argue over because that is the way that we arrive at the right way to do things."

In the same interview, Espaillat expressed hope that the political polarization of the American people can be overcome, "This is a country that is full of good people who have welcomed immigrants like me in the past. I feel like I was born here, even though I wasn't and this is the story of many, many people who have been saved by coming here. I believe in the Statue of Liberty, I believe in the torch."

== Publications ==
=== Bilingual ===
- Mundo y palabra/The World and the Word (2001), Oyster River Press
- Agua de dos ríos: Poemas, prosa y traducciones – una coleccíon bilingüe'' (2006) Dominican Ministry of Culture

=== In English ===
- Lapsing to Grace (1992)
- Where Horizons Go: Poems (1998)
- Rehearsing Absence (2001)
- The Shadow I Dress In (2004)
- The Story-Teller's Hour (2004)
- Playing at Stillness (2005)
- Her Place in These Designs (2008)
- And After All (2018)
- The Field (2019)

=== In Spanish ===
- Oscura fruta: cuarenta y dos poemas (2013) (42 translations into Spanish of poems by Richard Wilbur), Ediciones El Tucán de Virginia, Mexico City
- Algo hay que no es amigo de Los muros: cuarenta poemas (2014) (40 translations into Spanish of poems by Robert Frost), Ediciones El Tucán de Virginia, Mexico City
