= María Isabel Soldevila =

Dominican journalist (born 1977)

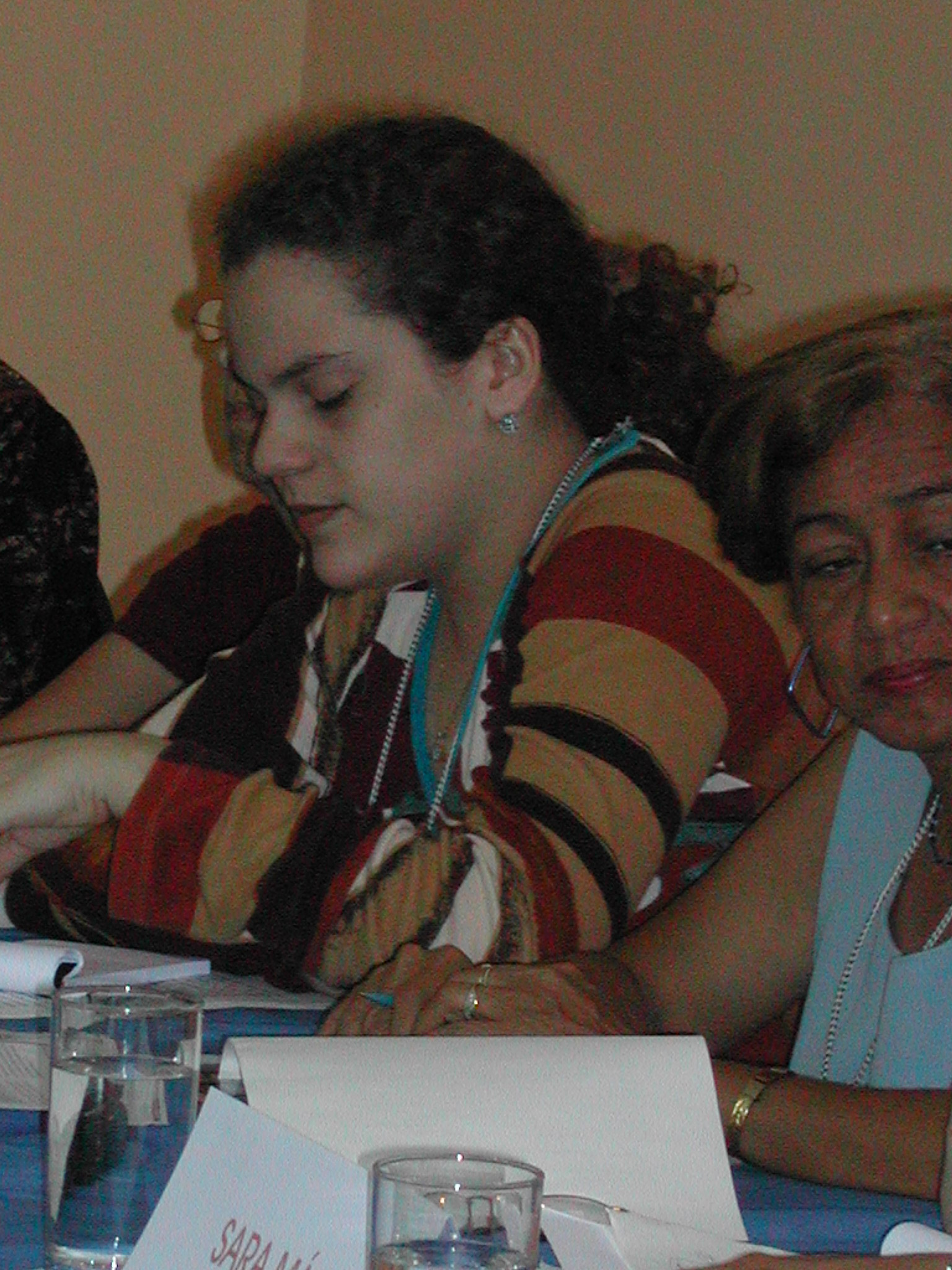
- Born: 1977; Santo Domingo
- Education: Columbia University; New York University; University of Paris
- Known for: Journalism
- Television: ?-?: El Séptimo Diario; 2013-present: Enfoque Matinal (NCDN)
- Board member of: Listín Diario
- Awards: Premio a la Excelencia Periodística (Pellerano Alfau Foundation)
- Website: mariasoldevila.blogspot.com

María Isabel Soldevila Brea (b. Santo Domingo) is a journalist, academician, columnist, television presenter, and writer from the Dominican Republic.

== Biography ==
When Soldevila was 18 years old, she began an internship at Listin Diario.

Soldevila studied Journalism in New York City with a Fulbright Program scholarship at Columbia University and obtained a Master's degree; in France, she studied French language and civilisation.

Soldevila later worked for the newspaper Hoy and the magazine Rumbo. She was editor-in-chief of the newspaper Listín Diario, the largest print media in the Dominican Republic. Since September 2013 she is associate producer and news presenter at NCDN, a broadcast news network. Soldevila has been director of the School of Communication at the Pontifical Catholic University Mother and Teacher.

Since February 2017, she is the Executive Manager and Communication Director of the Institute for European Studies at the Université libre de Bruxelles. She is also currently a Knight Wallace Fellow at the University of Michigan.
