= Manuel Corripio Alonso =

Dominican businessman and media executive

- Occupations: Businessman and media executive
- Title: Vice president of Grupo Corripio
- Father: José Luis Corripio
- Awards: Insignia of the Order of the Aztec Eagle (2002); Officer's Cross of the Order of Isabella the Catholic (2023)

Manuel Corripio Alonso is a Dominican businessman and media executive. He is vice president of Grupo Corripio, a diversified business conglomerate in the Dominican Republic, and has served as president of Grupo de Comunicaciones Corripio. He is also president of the board of directors of Editora Listín Diario, the publisher of the newspaper Listín Diario.

== Business career ==
Corripio Alonso is a son of businessman José Luis Pepín Corripio Estrada, who has led Grupo Corripio.

By 2002, Corripio Alonso was president of the Dominican-Mexican Chamber of Commerce and a business leader within Grupo Corripio. A decree issued by the Mexican government that year stated that he had maintained relations with the Mexican embassy and the Mexican community in the Dominican Republic, and had promoted Mexico through media outlets owned by the group.

A 2006 profile published by Hoy described him as vice president of Grupo Corripio and as an executive responsible for business units involving household appliances, consumer products, television channels and automotive distribution. In 2021, during a business symposium concerning the economic and technological effects of the COVID-19 pandemic, Acento identified him as executive vice president of Grupo Corripio and president of Grupo de Comunicaciones Corripio.

== Cultural and educational activities ==
Corripio Alonso is a member of Fundación Corripio, a cultural foundation based in the Dominican Republic. The foundation has recorded his participation in its annual award ceremonies, including addresses delivered on behalf of the Corripio Alonso family.

In December 2024, he joined the board of directors of the Pontificia Universidad Católica Madre y Maestra alongside María Amalia León and Cruz Amalia Rodríguez de Casado. In September 2025, he was the guest speaker at the university's 78th graduation ceremony at its Santo Domingo campus.

Corripio Alonso is also a trustee of Fundación Corripio Alonso, an Asturias-based foundation established in 2024 by his parents, José Luis Corripio Estrada and Ana María Alonso de Corripio.

== Honours ==
- 2002: Insignia of the Order of the Aztec Eagle, awarded by the government of Mexico.
- 2023: Officer's Cross of the Order of Isabella the Catholic, awarded by Felipe VI of Spain. The distinction recognised his contribution to relations between Spain and the Dominican Republic, including his activities in the business and cultural sectors.
