= Hoy (Dominican newspaper) =

- Type: Daily newspaper
- Founder(s): Miguel Franjul
- Publisher: Editora Hoy S.A.S.
- Editor: Bienvenido Álvarez Vega
- Founded: August 11, 1981; 44 years ago
- Language: Spanish
- Headquarters: Dominican Republic
- Country: Dominican Republic
- Website: hoy.com.do

Hoy (Spanish for Today) is a nationally circulated newspaper in the Dominican Republic.

It was founded August 11, 1981, by José Luis Corripio Estrada (president of Grupo Corripio) with assistant editor Miguel Franjul (who later became the director of Listín Diario, where he had worked previously). It was initially supervised by journalist (and later journalism professor, ambassador and United Nations dignitary) Virgilio Alcántara, who in total founded and directed four daily newspapers, including Última Hora (Breaking News). Subsequent chief editors were Nelson Marrero and Mario Álvarez Dugan (who led 1988–2016). Its current director is Bienvenido Álvarez Vega, who has over 50 years experience in journalism.

At one point, Hoy was the second bestselling newspaper nationwide. However, for multiple reasons as well as the decline in sales of print news, more recent circulation of Hoy has declined to approximately 82,000. Beyond print circulation, however, Hoy has maintained a strong digital presence. As of December 2024, its website, hoy.com.do, received approximately 2.84 million visits. Editora Hoy S.A.S., the publisher of Hoy, has reported a sales revenue of US$8.99 million.
