= List of newspapers in the Dominican Republic =

This is a list of newspapers in the Dominican Republic.

- El Caribe (Santo Domingo)
- Diario Libre (Santo Domingo) – free newspaper
- Dominican Today
- Listín Diario (Santo Domingo) – oldest newspaper in the Dominican Republic
- El Nacional (Santo Domingo) – afternoon newspaper

== See also ==
- List of newspapers
