= Jeannette Miller =

Santo Dominican writer and art historian (born 1944)

- Born: Jeannette de los Ángeles Miller Rivas; 2 August 1944 (age 82); Santo Domingo, Dominican Republic
- Education: Universidad Autónoma de Santo Domingo,

Jeannette Miller (Jeannette de los Ángeles Miller Rivas, born in Santo Domingo, Dominican Republic on 2 August 1944) is a writer, poet, narrator essayist and art historian of Dominican art. She was awarded the National Literature prize from her country in 2011.

== Biography ==
Miller was the daughter of writer Fredy Miller and Rosa Rivas. Her father's own role as a writer influenced her from an early age, although he was assassinated by the Trujillo regime on 5 May 1959.

She completed her primary education at Colegio María Auxiliadora and her high school education at Colegio Apostolado de Santo Domingo. She earned her BA in literature at the Universidad Autónoma de Santo Domingo, where she later taught. She also taught at the Universidad Central del Este, the Escuela Nacional de Bellas Artes, the Seminario Arquidiocesano Santo Tomás de Aquino and at the Centro Bonó.

From 1965 to 1970 she lived in Madrid, Spain, where she studied X Curso Iberoamericano (1966–1967) for Spanish language professors at the Instituto de Cultura Hispánica. During that period, she took classes with Manuel Criado de Val, Carlos Bousoño and other distinguished professors. In 1967, she taught Curso de Desarrollo Comunitario at the Instituto León XIII de Madrid. And, in 1976, she participated in the Seminario Museología y Arte with professor Donald B. Goddall, under the auspices of The Southern Consortium for International Education, at the ICDA, Santo Domingo.

Miller was a leading figure of the so-called Generation of '60, which later became the Arte y Liberación (1962) movement and then El Puño, together with Miguel Alfonseca, Silvano Lora, José Ramírez Conde, René del Risco, Jacques Viau and others.

Her creative and intellectual activity encompasses poetry, narrative, essay, criticism and art history. Her articles on art criticism have been published by the newspapers El Caribe and Hoy. In 2000, she was Director of the Cultural Supplement ESPACIOS, for El Caribe and she is a member of the Academia Dominicana de la Historia.

In 2006, Alfaguara published her novel La vida es otra cosa, which became a bestseller in Dominican literature.

She has been a juror in national and international Literature and Plastic Arts competitions. She was a founding member of the Board of Trustees of the Museum of Modern Art of Santo Domingo and of the Casa del Escritor Dominicano. In 1975, she received the Investigación Teatro Nacional award and the Comisión Jurídica de la Mujer from the United Nations. In 1976, she was awarded the Crónica y Crítica de Arte Fundación Pellerano Alfau award.

In 1977, she won the Silver Supreme Joyces (Premio Supremo de Plata Joyces), awarded to the ten most outstanding young people in the Dominican Republic, as well as the Annual Award in the 1997 Art Book category from the Asociación Puertorriqueña de Críticos de Arte.

In 2007, she was awarded the Premio Nacional Feria del Libro “Eduardo León Jimenes”, for her book Importancia del contexto histórico en el desarrollo del arte dominicano, within the framework of the 2007 International Book Fair.

In el 2010, She was awarded the Premio Nacional de Cuento José Ramón López for her book A mí no me gustan los boleros. That same year, she was also awarded the Premio Nacional de Literatura, sponsored by the Fundación Corripio and the Ministerio de Cultura. Her literary work has been translated into English, French, Italian, Portuguese and German, and appears in major studies and anthologies on Caribbean literature.

== Work ==
=== Poetry ===
- El Viaje (poetry) Cuadernos Hispanoamericanos. Spain, 1967.
- Fórmulas para Combatir el Miedo (poetry) Taller. Santo Domingo, 1972.
- Fichas de identidad/Estadías (poetry) Editora Taller. Santo Domingo, 1985.
- Polvo eres (poetry). Colección del Banco Central de la República Dominicana. Santo Domingo, 2013.

=== Art history/criticism ===
- Artes plásticas. Enciclopedia Dominicana. Santo Domingo, 1976.
- Historia de la pintura dominicana. Amigo del Hogar, 1979.
- Guía de la Galería de Arte Moderno. Santo Domingo. Ediciones Galería de Arte Moderno, 1982.
- Paul Guidicelli: Sobreviviente de una época oscura. Ediciones Galería de Arte Moderno. Santo Domingo, 1983.
- Fernando Peña Defilló: Desde el origen hacia la libertad. Ediciones Galería de Arte Moderno. Santo Domingo, 1983.
- Paisaje dominicano: pintura y poesía. Gatón Arce, Freddy; Miller, Jeannette. Ediciones Empresas BHD. Santo Domingo, 1992.
- An Approach to Dominican Art 1920-1970. Modern and Contemporary Art of the Dominican Repúblic. Sullivan, Edward; Miller, Jeannette; Tolentino, Marianne y Ferrer, Elizabeth. Americas Society and The Spanish Institute. New York, 1996.
- José Rincón Mora. Munich, 1996.
- Arte dominicano, artistas españoles y modernidad: 1920–1961. Miller Jeannette, Ugarte, María. Ediciones Centro Cultural Hispánico and the Instituto de Cooperación Iberoamericana, Santo Domingo, 1996.
- Noemí Ruiz y la poesía visual del Trópico. Borinquen Lithographers Corp., Carolina, Puerto Rico, 1996.
- Arte dominicano: 1944–1997, in Identidad, órgano informativo del Museo de Arte Moderno. Editora Alfa y Omega, Santo Domingo, 1997.
- Gaspar Mario Cruz: poeta de las formas. Ediciones Último Arte, Santo Domingo, 1997.
- Art in Dominican Republic: 1844–2000. Latin American Art in the 20th Century. London, Phaidon Press Limited, 1996 / Madrid, Editorial Nerea, 1998.
- República Dominicana: arte del siglo XX. Arte latinoamericano y del Caribe al umbral del siglo XXI. UNESCO, Paris, 1999.
- Domingo Batista: esencia y monumentalidad del paisaje dominicano. Domingo Batista: fotografías dominicanas (art) UNESCO, Consejo Presidencial de Cultura, Santo Domingo, 1999.
- Fernando Peña Defilló. Vistacolor, Miami, 2000.
- Arte dominicano: 1844–2000. Pintura, dibujo, gráfica y mural. Miller, Jeannette; Ugarte María. Colección Cultural Codetel. Amigo del Hogar, Santo Domingo, 2001.
- Tesoros de arte del Banco Popular Dominicano. Ediciones del Banco Popular Dominicano, Santo Domingo, 2001.
- Arte dominicano: 1844–2000. Escultura, instalaciones, medios no tradicionales y arte vitral. Miller, Jeannette; Ugarte María. Colección Cultural Codetel. Amigo del Hogar, Santo Domingo, 2002.
- Magia y verismo del blanco y negro en el arte fotográfico de Max Pou. Cien veces Max. Publicaciones Centro León. Santiago de los Caballeros, 2005.
- Domingo Batista: asombro, parpadeo, esplendor, paisaje, luz… Domingo Batista XL, Publicaciones Centro León. Santiago de los Caballeros, 2005.
- La mujer en el arte dominicano. Ediciones Banco del Progreso Dominicano, Santo Domingo, 2005.
- Importancia del contexto histórico en el desarrollo del arte dominicano. Cronología del arte dominicano: 1844–2005. Secretaría de Estado de Educación Superior, Ciencia y Tecnología. Editora Amigo del Hogar. Santo Domingo.
- Historia de la Fotografía Dominicana, 2 volumes (art history). Colección Centenario Grupo León Jimenes. Santo Domingo, 2010.
- República Dominicana: arte y arquitectura: 1844–2000. Historia del Caribe. Chapter 16. Miller, Jeannette et al. Instituto de Historia, CCHS (CSIC). Madrid, Spain, 2010.

=== Narrative ===
- Cuentos de Mujeres (short story) Cole, 2002.
- La vida es otra cosa (novel) Alfaguara, 2005.
- A mi no me gustan los boleros (short story). Alfaguara, 2009.
- El corazón de Juan (short story). Banco León. Santo Domingo, 2013.
- La verdadera historia de María Cristo (short story). Santillana Santo Domingo, 2015.
- Hombrecito (short story). LOQUELEO, Santillana. Santo Domingo, 2016.

=== Essay ===
- Fernando Peña Defilló: Mundos paralelos. Ediciones Galería de Arte Moderno, Santo Domingo, 1985.
- Poesía y pintura dominicanas: una relación que permanece. Ponencias del Primer Congreso Crítico de Literatura Dominicana. Editora de Colores. Santo Domingo, 1994.
- Arte, globalización, el miedo dinamizante y la respuesta contestataria. Globalización. Nomadismo. Identidades Documento de la VII Bienal Internacional de Cuenca. Monsalve Moreno Editores, Ecuador, 2002.
- Entre la sobrevivencia y el miedo: mujer, literatura, globalización y disidencia. Revista Xinesquema No 3. Santo Domingo, April, 2003.
- Igneri Foundation: Pottery as Identity Revista. Ceramics Technical, No. 19. Australia, 2004.
- La mujer en el pensamiento dominicano. Xinesquema. Santo Domingo 2004, Cole. Santo Domingo.
- Mujer. Mujer. Nicole Sánchez y Giovanna Bonnelly. Ediciones Mercasid, Santo Domingo, 2007.
- La lectura como liberación e identidad: importancia de los autores nacionales. Areíto. Periódico Hoy. Santo Domingo. 2 August 2008.
- Rescatando la poesía nacional con la Colección Pensamiento Dominicano. Colección Pensamiento Dominicano, tomo I: Poesía. Publicaciones del Banco de Reservas, Santo Domingo, 2008.
- Textos sobre arte literatura e identidad. Colección del Banco Central de la República Dominicana. Santo Domingo, 2009.
- La Mañosa: una excelente fotografía del siglo XX dominicano. Dos coloquios sobre la obra de Juan Bosch. Colección del Banco Central de la República Dominicana. Santo Domingo, 2010.
- El exilio republicano español y sus aportes a la modernidad en el arte dominicano. El exilio republicano español en la sociedad dominicana. Miller, Jeannette et al. Comisión Permanente de Efemérides Patrias, Archivo General de la Nación, volumen CXIII; Academia Dominicana de la Historia, volumen LXXXIX. Editora Búho. Santo Domingo. March, 2010.

=== Miscellaneous ===
- El mundo mágico de Gilberto Hernández Ortega (screenplay) Cinemateca Nacional. Santo Domingo, 1979.
- Ortografía (textbook) Amigo del Hogar. Santo Domingo, 1981.
- Redacción (textbook) Amigo del Hogar. Santo Domingo, 1983.
- Cuentos dominicanos (anthology) Editor, selection and prologue. Colección Letra Grande. Co-edition UNESCO and Editora Popular, Paris-Madrid, 2000.
- Fredy Miller: realidad y leyenda (Editor, selection and prologue). Colección del Banco Central de la República Dominicana, Santo Domingo, 2005.
- María Ugarte: textos literarios (Editor, selection and prologue). Colección del Banco Central de la República Dominicana, Santo Domingo, 2006.
