= Carlos Rubio =

- Born: Carlos Enrique Rubio Martínez de Ubago; November 27, 1981 (age 44); Santo Domingo, Dominican Republic
- Education: Escuela Nacional de la Judicatura Florida International University
- Occupations: lawyer and columnist
- Employer(s): Ministry of Industry and Commerce R&A Legal Counsel and Investment

Carlos Enrique Rubio y Martínez de Ubago is a Dominican penalist lawyer, former intelligence agent, YouTuber, Instagrammer, and columnist, who is exiled in the United States. He is most known for suing the Brazilian company Odebrecht in his country, Dominican Republic, for paying bribes to senior officials.

== Biography ==
Carlos Enrique Rubio was born on November 27, 1981, in Santo Domingo, the Dominican Republic. When he was 8, his mother died, and when he was 13, his father died.

He studied criminal law at the National School of the Judiciary and was trained as an Anti-Money Laundering consultant in the United States. By 2016, he was working as an Industry and Commerce Analyst for the Ministry of Industry and Commerce of the Dominican Republic.

He has worked as a columnist for the newspapers Listin Diario and Acento, both from the Dominican Republic.

Carlos Rubio presented a lawsuit against the Odebrecht company in the Dominican Republic, alleging a circumstantial account in which he presents what is stated around figures such as money laundering, bribery and the responsibility of officials in the procurement and bidding processes; he was the first civilian that has ever presented a lawsuit of that magnitude in the Dominican Republic. Also, in September 25, 2017, he assured that Dominican government was using money to buy journalists who didn't agree with their governing style.

On October 3, 2017, Carlos Rubio presented a lawsuit against many judges of the Second Chamber of the Civil and Commercial Chamber of the National District, for the purpose of investigating the fast increase of their assets

== Publications ==
- Rubio, Carlos (2016): "El Derecho a la Intimidad", article published in the newspaper Listín Diario (Santo Domingo)
- Rubio, Carlos (2016): "Vox Populi", article published in the newspaper Acento (Santo Domingo)
- Rubio, Carlos (2016):"No más odio", article published in the newspaper Listín Diario (Santo Domingo)
- Rubio, Carlos (2016): "Harto de la corrupción", article published in the newspaper Listín Diario (Santo Domingo)
- Rubio, Carlos (2016): "El costo del Gobierno a los Dominicanos", article published in the newspaper Acento (Santo Domingo)
