= Andrés Mata =

Andrés Mata may refer to:

- Andrés Mata (writer) (1870–1931), Venezuelan poet, writer and journalist
- Andrés Mata (weightlifter) (born 1992), Venezuelan-born Spanish weightlifter
