= Félix Acosta-Núñez =

Dominican Republic sportscaster

Félix Acosta-Núñez (20 February 1924 – 14 June 2005) was the former sports editor of one of the major newspapers in San Francisco de Macorís, Dominican Republic, Listin Diario. An important figure in journalism in the Dominican Republic, Acosta-Núñez received many honors for his work.

== Biography ==
Acosta-Núñez was born in San Francisco de Macorís in the Dominican Republic on 20 February 1924. After studying medicine for several years, Acosta-Núñez switched career tracks and entered journalism in the 1940s. From the 1960s through the 1980s, Acosta-Núñez was the sports editor of Listin Diario.

Acosta-Nunez was one of the most famous sports commentators, not only in the Dominican Republic, but in Latin America. He ran various television shows in the television station Radio Television Dominicana. In the area of baseball he was mostly known as the commentator in the stadium of one of the four biggest teams in the Dominican Republic. After he retired, he was honored by the Listin Diario as one of its greatest contributors and a portion of the stadium where he used to work as a sports commentator was named after him.

Acosta-Núñez received a number of awards, including being knighted by two different presidents into the Order of Duarte, Joaquín Balaguer and former president Hipólito Mejía, being inducted into the Dominican Sports Hall of Fame and being six times elected by the Sports Writers Association of Santo Domingo as "Chronicler of the Year".

Acosta-Núñez died on 14 June 2005, following a lengthy battle with Alzheimers.
