= El Imparcial (disambiguation) =

El Imparcial is a Puerto Rican newspaper.

El Imparcial may also refer to other newspapers:

- El Imparcial (Hermosillo), see Badabun
- El Imparcial (Oaxaca), see Wet market
- El Imparcial (Madrid), Spain
- El Imparcial (Chicago), USA
- El Imparcial (Caracas), see Andrés Vigas, Venezuela
