= Aníbal de Castro =

Dominican diplomat and journalist

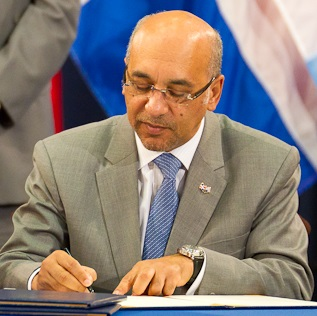

Dominican Republic Ambassador to Belgium and to the European Union
- Incumbent
- Assumed office 2017

Dominican Republic Ambassador to Spain
- In office 2014–2017
- Succeeded by: Olivo Rodríguez Huertas

Dominican Republic Ambassador to the United States
- In office 2011–2014

Dominican Republic Ambassador to United Kingdom
- In office 2004–2011
- Succeeded by: Federico Cuello Camilo

Personal details
- Born: 1949 (age 76–77) Eugenio María de Hostos
- Education: Universidad Autónoma de Santo Domingo; University of East Anglia
- Profession: Diplomat and journalist

Aníbal de Jesús de Castro Rodríguez (born 1949) is a Dominican diplomat and journalist, who is currently the Dominican Republic Ambassador to Belgium and to the European Union.

He was educated at the Universidad Autónoma de Santo Domingo and the University of East Anglia (Development Studies, 1979). In 2004 he was appointed Ambassador to the United Kingdom, representing the Dominican Republic as nonresident Ambassador to Australia (2007–11) and the Republic of Ireland (2009–11). He served as Dominican Republic Ambassador to the United States from 2011 to 2014.

A well known journalist, he was founding editor of the newspaper Diario Libre, and has written opinion columns for Listín Diario.

Political offices
Preceded by Alejandro Gonzalez Pons (diplomat)	Ambassador of the Dominican Republic to Belgium and to the European Union; 2017-	Succeeded by
Preceded by César Medina	Ambassador of the Dominican Republic to Spain; October 2014–2017	Succeeded by Olivo Rodríguez Huertas
Preceded by Roberto Saladín	Ambassador of the Dominican Republic to the United States; May 2011–October 2014	Succeeded by José Tomás Pérez
Preceded by Office created	Concurrent ambassador of the Dominican Republic to Australia (residing in the United Kingdom); September 2007–May 2011	Succeeded by Federico Alberto Cuello Camilo
Preceded by	Ambassador of the Dominican Republic to the United Kingdom; November 2004–May 2011	Succeeded by Federico Cuello Camilo
