= List of ambassadors of the Dominican Republic to the United States =

Ambassador of the Dominican Republic to the United States of America
- Embajadora de la República Dominicana en los Estados Unidos de América
- Coat of arms of the Dominican Republic

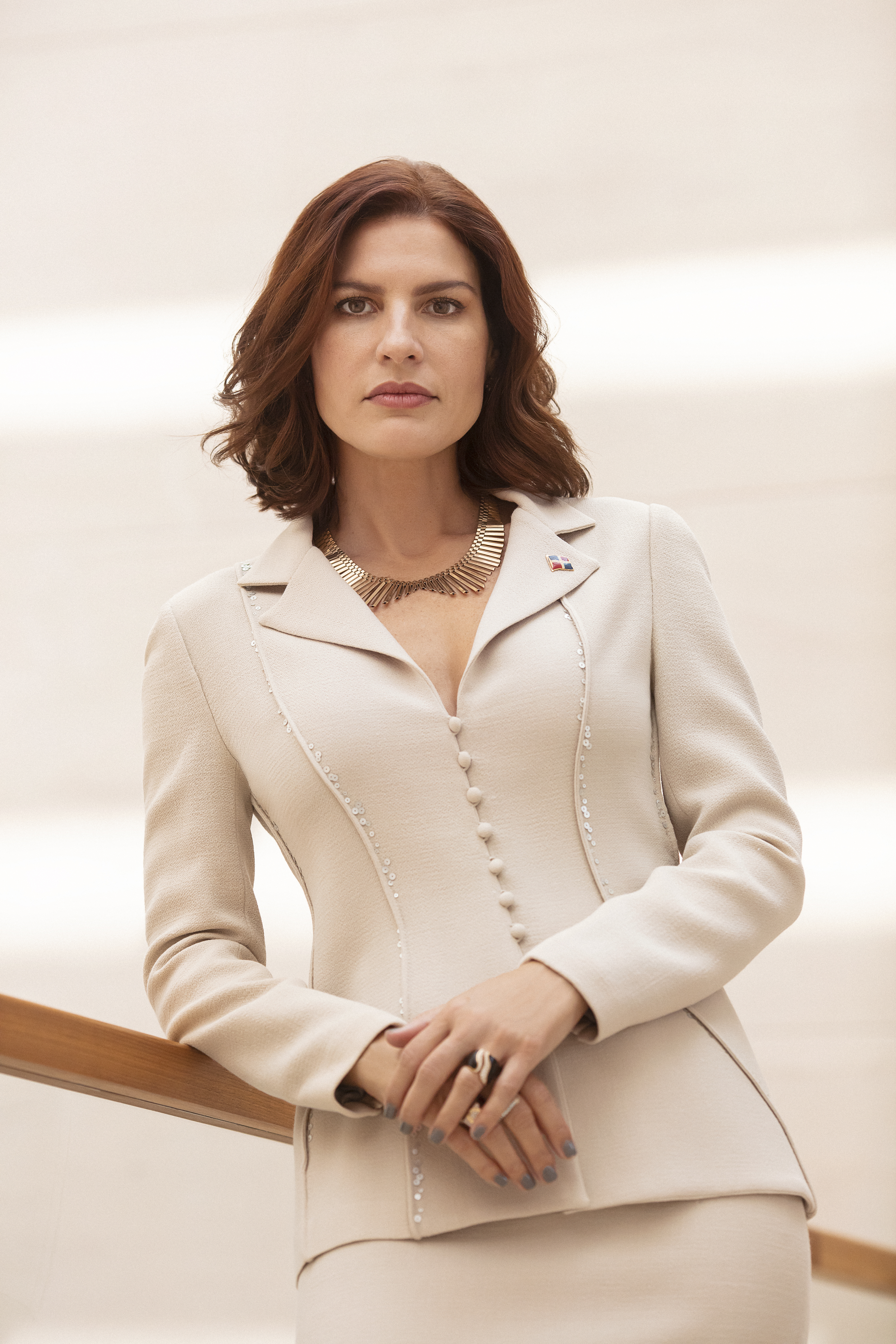
- Incumbent; María Isabel Castillo Báez since April 9, 2025
- Ministry of Foreign Affairs of the Dominican Republic; Embassy of the Dominican Republic in the United States
- Style: Mr./Madam Ambassador (informal); His/Her Excellency (formal)
- Type: Head of mission
- Reports to: Minister of Foreign Affairs of the Dominican Republic
- Residence: 1715 22nd Street, NW, Washington, D.C.
- Seat: Embassy of the Dominican Republic in the United States
- Nominator: President of the Dominican Republic
- Appointer: President of the Dominican Republic; with Senate advice and consent
- Term length: At the pleasure of the president
- Inaugural holder: Alejandro Woss y Gil
- Formation: 1894; 132 years ago
- Salary: US$5,000 (monthly)
- Website: usa.mirex.gob.do (in Spanish and English)

The Ambassador of the Dominican Republic to the United States of America is in charge of the Dominican Republic's diplomatic mission to the United States.

The ambassador's residence is on 1715 22nd Street, NW in Washington, D.C.

The current Ambassador, María Isabel Castillo Báez, presented his credentials in April, 2025.

== List of ambassadors ==
Ambassadors of the Dominican Republic to the United States of America 1894–present:

- Alejandro Woss y Gil (1894–1899)
- Emilio C. Joubert (1900)
- Francisco Leonte Vázquez (1901–1904)
- Juan Francisco Sánchez (1904)
- Emilio C. Joubert (1904–1908)
- Arturo L. Fiallo (1909)
- Emilio C. Joubert (1909–1911)
- Francisco J. Peynado (1912–1913)
- Eduardo R. Soler (1914)
- Enrique Jiménez (1915)
- A. Peréz Perdomo (1915–1917)
- Luis Galván (1917–1920)
- Emilio C. Joubert (1920–1924)
- Jóse del Carmen Ariza (1924–1926)
- Angel Morales (1926–1930)
- Rafael Brache (1930–1931)
- Roberto L. Despradel Pennell (1931–1934)
- Rafael Brache (1934–1935)
- Andrés Pastoriza (1935–1941)
- José María Troncoso (1941–1943)
- Anselmo Copello (1943–1944)
- Emilio García Godoy (1944–1947)
- Julio Ortega Frier (1947)
- Luis F. Thomen (1947–1953)
- Manuel A. de Moya (1953–1955)
- Joaquin E. Salazar (1955–1957)
- Manuel A. de Moya (1957–1959)
- Luis F. Thomen Candelario (1959–1961)
- Andrés Freites Barrera (1962–1963)
- Enriquillo del Rosario (1963)
- José A. Bonilla Atiles (1964–1965)
- Milton T. Messina Matos (1965–1966)
- Héctor García-Godoy (1966—1969)
- Mario Read Vittini (1969–1970)
- Salvador Ortiz (1970–1974)
- Horacio Vicioso Soto (1974–1978)
- Francisco Augusto Lora (1978–1979)
- Enriquillo del Rosario (1979–1981)
- José Rafael Molina Morillo (1981–1982)
- Carlos Despradel Roques (1982–1985)
- Eulogio José Santaella Ulloa (1985–1987)
- Eduardo A. León (1987–1989)
- Carlos Morales Troncoso (1989–1991)
- José del Carmen Ariza (1991–1996)
- Bernardo Vega (1997–1999)
- Roberto B. Saladín Selín (1999–2002)
- Hugo Guilliani Cury (2002–2004)
- Flavio Darío Espinal (2004–2009)
- Roberto Saladín (2009–2011)
- Aníbal de Castro (2011–2014)
- José Tomás Pérez (2014–2020)
- Sonia Guzmán Klang (2020–2025)
- María Isabel Castillo Báez (2025–present)
