= Fanjul =

Fanjul or Franjul might refer to:

- Alfonso Fanjul Sr. (1909-1980), Cuban sugar baron, father of the Fanjul brothers
- Beatriz Fanjul (born 1991), Spanish politician
- Borja Fanjul (born 1975), Spanish politician
- The Fanjul Brothers, sugar company owners residing in Palm Beach, Florida
- The Franjul Family, a prominent Dominican Republic Family
