= Cuello (surname) =

Cuello is a Spanish surname. Notable people with the surname include:

- Claudio Cuello (born 1958), Argentine volleyball player and coach
- Denver Cuello (born 1986), Filipino boxer
- Emil Cuello (born 1997), Argentine and American footballer
- Federico Cuello Camilo (born 1966), Dominican Republic diplomat
- Luciano Leonel Cuello (born 1984), Argentine boxer
- Miguel Ángel Cuello (1946–1999), Argentine boxer
- Román Cuello (born 1977), Uruguayan footballer
- Tomás Cuello (born 2000), Argentine footballer
