= Carmen Natalia =

Dominican feminist and writer

Carmen Natalia Martínez Bonilla, known simply as Carmen Natalia, (April 19, 1917 — January 6, 1976) was a Dominican feminist poet, essayist, playwright, and activist in opposition to the dictatorship of Rafael Trujillo.

== Early life ==
Carmen Natalia Martínez Bonilla was born in San Pedro de Macorís, Dominican Republic, in 1917. Her parents were Andrés Martínez Aybar and Carmen Julia Bonilla Atiles, and she was one of seven children. In 1931, her family moved to Santo Domingo, where she worked for a time in a relative's factory to help support her mother.

As a child, she studied at the Salomé Ureña School. Carmen Natalia was an autodidact, having been refused admission to the Universidad de Santo Domingo, where she had hoped to study philosophy and literature, because of her political beliefs. She had signed a letter condemning the firing of her uncle, José Antonio Bonilla Atiles, a professor at the university.

Instead, in 1937 she obtained a job as advertising manager for the movie distribution company Circuito Rialto, working to promote radio programs, theater performances, and films.

=== Literary debut ===
In 1939, at just 22 years old, she published her first book of poetry, Alma Adentro. She began writing frequently under the pen name Carmen Natalia for such varied literary journals as Los Nuevos and La Poesía Sorprendida, also contributing to the newspapers La Opinión and Listín Diario.

In 1942, her first novel, La Victoria, was honored as the best Dominican novel at the Farrar & Rinehart International Competition in Washington. It openly questioned the social order under the Trujillo regime.

=== Political activity ===
Carmen Natalia was considered one of the driving forces behind the anti-Trujillo youth organization Juventud Democrática Dominicana in the 1940s. In 1946, her brother Andrés was expelled from the Colegio La Salle for being a member of the organization, and she wrote an angry letter to the school's director in response.

Her involvement in the underground Vanguardia Revolucionaria movement got her fired from her job at Circuito Rialto, and she was banned from continuing to write for La Opinión. All of her family members also lost their jobs, including her father. Things grew worse in 1949 when her brother, José Rolando Martínez Bonilla, participated in the failed Luperón invasion, an attempted rebellion against Trujillo. Though he survived, it was the final straw that pushed Carmen Natalia and her family into exile.

== Exile ==
The regime was after Carmen Natalia and her family, and in 1950 she was exiled to Puerto Rico. There, she continued her literary career, frequently writing about the country she had left behind.

In 1959, she won first prize from the Ateneo Puertorriqueño for her poem "Llanto sin término por el hijo nunca llegado" ("Endless Crying for the Child Who Never Arrived"). She ran the Puerto Rican magazine Ventanas and worked on adaptations of her literary work for television and radio.

== Return to the Dominican Republic ==
Carmen Natalia returned to the Dominican Republic after Trujillo's death in 1961.

Under the new Dominican government, she was chosen to speak at the United Nations and at the Organization of American States, where she called for the defense of women's rights. She also served as a delegate for the Dominican Republic to the UNICEF Executive Board.

In 1963, she was chosen as president of the Inter-American Commission of Women.

=== Death and legacy ===
After many years of living with muscular dystrophy, Carmen Natalia died in Santo Domingo in 1976.

A collection of her poetic work, Poesías: Obra poética completa, 1939-1976, was published in 1981 by the Universidad Católica Madre y Maestra.

== Style ==
Carmen Natalia wrote poems on a wide variety of subjects, everything from love to the feminine condition to her deep hatred for the regime. Her poetry spanned different movements and is difficult to categorize, with elements of postmodernism. While her early work was more romantic, she quickly turned to writing about the harsh realities of life in Trujillo's Dominican Republic.

Some of Carmen Natalia's most representative poems include "Canto a la tierra," "La Miseria está de ronda," "No fue porque yo quise," and "El Grito." She wrote many poems directly addressing the fight against Trujillo and memorializing martyrs of their cause, including "Elegía a los mártires de Constanza, Maimón y Estero Hondo," "Oda heroica a las Mirabal," and "Poema recóndito para un Mártir de la Libertad," dedicated to the memory of Salvador Reyes Sánchez, who died in the failed 1949 invasion that her brother survived.

== Selected works ==
=== Poetry ===
- Alma adentro (1939)
- Llanto sin Término por el Hijo Nunca Llegado (1959)
- El hombre tras las rejas (1962)

=== Novels ===
- La Victoria (1942)
- Cristóbal

=== Essays ===
- Veinte actitudes y una epístola

=== Theater ===
- Adaptaciones de la Cenicienta y la Bella Durmiente (1950)
- El milagro de la Epifanía (a play meant to be performed by blind children, 1953)
- Estampas de la vida de Maria (a play meant to be performed by deaf children, 1954)
