= Miguel Franjul =

Dominican author and editor

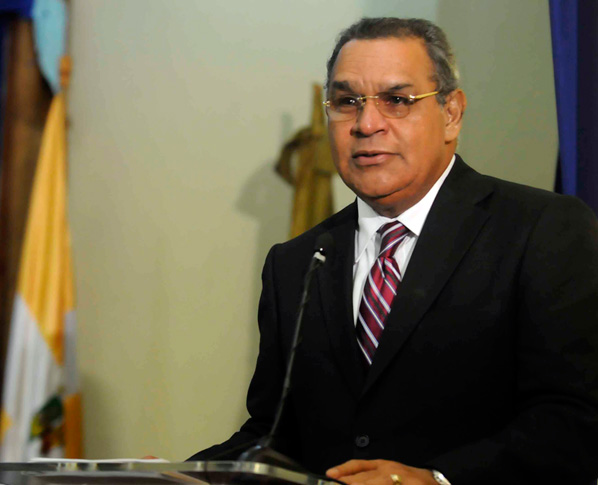
- Miguel Franjul in 2015
- Born: 17 March 1951 (age 75); Bani, Dominican Republic
- Occupations: Journalist author
- Website: laopiniondemiguelfranjul.wordpress.com

Miguel Franjul Bucarelly is a Dominican author and editor. He is currently the director of the newspaper Listín Diario and founded the newspaper Hoy. Franjul has published four books.

== Early life, family and education ==
Miguel Franjul was born in Baní, Dominican Republic, to Manuel Emilio Franjul Báez, a member of the prominent Franjul family of Asturian lineage; and Antonia Luisa Bucarelly Méndez, a teacher.

== Career ==
From the age of 17, Franjul devoted himself to journalism. In his long career of over 42 years, he has been director of three daily newspapers and one weekly newspaper. He is the director of the morning newspaper Listín Diario, the oldest newspaper in the Dominican Republic (founded in 1889).

His first job as editor was with Listin Diario in October 1968. He rose, after working in various news sources, to become international editor. He combined these functions with the correspondent of the magazine Vanity Fair and the international news agency Reuters.

He left Listín Diario in 1980 to found the newspaper Hoy, in which he was successively assistant editor, managing editor and deputy director and one of its main columnists.

From there he went on to direct the daily La Información in Santiago de los Caballeros, the second largest city in the Dominican Republic, and was recognized by Congress for the contributions made on behalf of children of that area and his campaign so that the Central Cibao aqueduct was built.

Following the death of Dominican journalist Rafael Herrera, director of Listin Diario since it reappeared in 1963, Franjul was appointed deputy director, roles he held for some months until moving to direct the newspaper La Nacion. However, in 2000, he returned to lead Listín Diario.

As a newspaper director, he has been known for an innovative spirit, introducing elements of modernity to each of the media. Franjul founded and directed the weekly Diario a Diario, with journalist Ruddy González.

Franjul is a guest lecturer at several universities and the Military Institute of Higher Education. He is the author of four books: "Somoza and Duvalier, la caída de dos dinastías" ("Somoza and Duvalier, falling of two dynasties"),"Bosch, noventa días de clandestinidad" ("Bosch, ninety days of hiding"), "La sociedad encancerada" ("The society with cancer") and "A la vera de la noticia" ("To the side of the news") that summarize his experiences of more than 40 years in journalism and in his travels around the world.

In January 2011, he was appointed regional vice president for the Dominican Republic of the Committee on Freedom of Press and Communication of the Inter American Press Association in October 2014 and was elected to the board of directors of the SIP. Also he became part of the executive committee (representing the newspapers of the Dominican Republic) at the World Association of Newspapers (WAN).

== Honors and awards ==
Franjul received an honorary doctorate in information science at the Universidad Tecnológica del Sur (UTESUR; "Technological University of the South") in Azua de Compostela, Dominican Republic.
