= Claudia Castaños =

Dominican lawyer, notary, and news presenter

Claudia M. Castaños Zouain
- Born: 27 July 1979 (age 47)
- Other name: Claudia Castaños de Bencosme
- Education: Pontificia Universidad Católica Madre y Maestra (PUCMM)
- Occupations: lawyer, TV and radio presenter
- Television: 2013–present: Enfoque Matinal (NCDN)
- Spouse: Filias Bencosme Pérez (m. 2003)
- Children: Emiliano, José María, María Claudia

Claudia María Castaños Zouain (born 27 July 1979) is a Dominican lawyer, notary, and news presenter.

Castaños graduated from Law in 2002, however, she works since 1998, at first in a Law Firm Castaños & Castaños, that belongs to her family, and later she launched with her husband and the Dominican lawyer Julio Alfredo Castaños Zouain their own law firm "Castaños Zouain". Since 2013, Castaños is anchorwoman at NCDN, a broadcast news network. and Since 2014 she has been a weekly collaborator of "Telenoticias", a primetime news broadcast on the Telesistema channel, with her Audience segment with Claudia Castaños. His incursion into the media aims to bring legal issues to the public, in an understandable and enjoyable.

== Media ==
Radio

- Magazine jurídico (95.7 FM)

Television

- Enfoque matinal (CDN, channel 37)
- Audiencia con Claudia Castaños (Telesistema, channel 11)
