= El Universal (Cartagena) =

Colombian newspaper

- Front page of El Universal, 3 April 2013
- Type: Daily newspaper
- Format: Broadsheet
- Founder(s): Domingo López Escauriaza, Eduardo Ferrer Ferrer
- Publisher: Editora del Mar S.A.
- Editor-in-chief: Pedro Luis Mogollón Vélez
- Managing editor: Gerardo Araújo Perdomo
- Founded: 8 March 1948
- Political alignment: Progressivism
- Language: Spanish
- Headquarters: Calle 30 # 17-36; Cartagena, Bolívar, Colombia
- Circulation: 25,000 Daily; 32,000 Sunday
- ISSN: 0122-6843
- Website: www.eluniversal.com.co

El Universal (English: The Universal) is a regional newspaper based in Cartagena de Indias, Colombia founded in 1948 by Domingo López Escauriaza and Eduardo Ferrer Ferrer. El Universal is member of the Latin American Newspaper Association, an organization of fourteen leading newspapers in South America.
