= Grupo de Diarios América =

Latin American news alliance

Grupo de Diarios América (English: America Group of Daily Newspapers) is a consortium of 11 major newspapers in Latin America. GDA was founded in 1991 by O Globo (Brazil), La Nación (Argentina), El Mercurio (Chile), El Tiempo (Colombia), El Comercio (Ecuador), La Prensa Gráfica (El Salvador), El Universal (México), El Comercio (Peru), El Nuevo Día (Puerto Rico), El País (Uruguay), and El Nacional (Venezuela), including these newspapers and their magazines (totaling over 150 print media outlets). GDA only has one member in each country. Brazilian newspaper Zero Hora (and its parent company, RBS) was originally also part of GDA.

== See also ==
- European Dailies Alliance
- Leading European Newspaper Alliance
- Latin American Newspaper Association
- Asia News Network
