= Arturo Pellerano Alfau =

Dominican business owner, Publisher and Journalist

Arturo Joaquín Pellerano Alfau (1864–1935) was a Dominican Republic merchant, publisher, and journalist. He, along with Julian Atiles, founded Listín Diario, the leading newspaper of the Dominican Republic, in 1889.

Pellerano tried to maintain the independence of his newspaper through the better times like the chronicling of the Cuban War of Independence which published detailed letters from Maximo Gomez and through the many troubled times during the US military intervention of 1916-24, he maintained a nationalistic line of constant protest. During Rafael Trujillo's reign, his newspaper office was attacked and he and his family were detained due to his decidedly Anti-Trujillo political views.

He married twice, first to Juana de Jesús Sardá Díaz, then to Estela Micaela López-Penha de Marchena, and had a total of 14 children.

His family remained connected to istínuDiario ntil Banco Intercontinental bought it in 2003.
