= European Dailies Alliance =

Alliance of major European newspapers

European Dailies Alliance (EDA) is an alliance formed by like-minded Conservative newspapers in Europe, namely ABC in Spain, The Daily Telegraph in United Kingdom, Le Figaro in France and Die Welt in Germany.

In 2001, the four newspapers, each of which is a newspaper of record in their country, agreed to form an alliance to enhance the co-operation between them and their respective websites. The agreement of the alliance included:

- to extend the international coverage of individual newspaper through editorial co-operation
- to have renowned foreign writers in the newspaper
- to offer privileged access to the database of other newspapers in the alliance
- to have links to other newspaper in the alliance on their own website
- to have exchange of editors
- to be benefited from the enhanced co-operation in the area of journalistic education and advertising business

The chairperson of the alliance is rotated among the chief editor of the member newspapers. Yves de Chaisemartin, the then chief editor of Le Figaro, the oldest newspaper in the alliance, was the first chairperson.

== See also ==
- Leading European Newspaper Alliance
- Grupo de Diarios América
- Latin American Newspaper Association
- Asia News Network
