= Maximiliano Gómez =

Dominican militant leader (1943–1971)

Maximiliano Gómez Horacio
- Born: 5 May 1943; San Pedro de Macorís, Dominican Republic
- Died: 23 May 1971 (aged 28); Brussels, Belgium
- Cause of death: Poisoning (allegedly)
- Other name: El Moreno
- Political party: Movimiento Popular Dominicano
- Movement: Communism

Maximiliano Gómez Horacio (5 May 1943 – 23 May 1971) also known as El Moreno, was a Dominican leader who led the Maoist Movimiento Popular Dominicano (MPD), a militant organization opposed to the Joaquín Balaguer government and to U.S. presence in the Dominican Republic. He was a controversial figure during his life and was a significant part of the Dominican Republic's political beritage. He focused his efforts during a short period of time to battle Balaguer's regime. Gomez was killed when his lover poisoned him. Many claim that she did so by orders of Balaguer, and in turn she was found killed and dismembered, possibly by the same people who ordered her to poison Gomez.

== Early life ==
Born in the eastern part of the Dominican Republic, specifically in San Pedro de Macorís on 5 May 1943. His parents were Federico Gomez and Mariana Horacio. He worked with them in the sugarcane industry, the predominant agricultural crop in that province. He also worked as a lathe operator (“a person whose job is to work with a lathe, especially a metal one”) at the Consuelo sugar mill.

In later years, the nickname, El Moreno was given to him in Czechoslovakia (now the Czech Republic and Slovakia, after their division) when he attended a training session of a group of leftists to receive political theories. The newspaper article explains that he was the only one with dark skin. However, at home he was called Moreno.

== Activism ==
As the years went by, his family moved to Santo Domingo, an opportunity that he took advantage of to join the ranks of the MPD, when he was 15 years old. One of his first occupations there was to sell the movement’s newspaper. As a member, he traveled to Cuba where he stayed for a period of nine months receiving training in guerrilla warfare and ideological instruction. After returning from his trip, he was named a member of the Central Committee of the Dominican Popular Movement (MPD).

In 1964, Gómez along with other party comrades started a guerrilla movement in the hills of Nagua. However, it was unsuccessful, since he and his companion, Ernesto López Molina, were caught in the act and as a consequence, Gómez was attacked by a mayor who wounded him in the forehead with a machete. The mark that Maximiliano had on his face was the scar from the machete blow he had received.

Gómez was arrested by the guards of the National Army and taken to Santo Domingo to the Ozama Fortress where he remained imprisoned for two months. He was finally released through a pardon that was given to prisoners with political affiliation at the end of 1964.

Newspaper documents report that after his release, he returned to his duties in the central committee of the MPD. In 1965, when the April Revolution erupted, he joined the revolution and confronted the invading North American force and the resistance troops.

At the end of the civil-military war, he married the young Carmen Mazara, who was also from San Pedro de Macorís, with whom he had two sons, Fabricio Ernesto and Guido Orlando, in honor of the journalist and lawyer who disappeared, Guido Gil Díaz, and Orlando Mazara, named after Carmen's cousin. The couple met when they were both active in the ranks of the June 14 Movement in San Pedro de Macorís. In January 1967, Gómez was named general secretary of the Dominican Popular Movement (MPD).

== Exile to Mexico ==
At some point, perhaps due to his insurgent activities, Maximiliano Gómez was in exile along with 19 other political prisoners. His departure from the country was due to the exile that he and the other political heavyweights received, after the negotiation they reached with the Dominican government because of the kidnapping that took place on 24 March 1970 against the American lieutenant colonel Donald J. Crowley, military attaché of the American embassy in Santo Domingo, who was kidnapped by the so-called "Unified Anti-Reelection Command of Military and Civilians" group, made up of five armed militants of the MPD, this group requested the release of 21 leftist political prisoners, among them was Gómez.

After reaching the agreement, the political prisoners along with Gómez were taken to Mexico on 27 March 1970, under strong police guard and with a safe conduct from the Mexican embassy.

== Death ==
On 23 May 1971, died in Brussels, Belgium at the age of 28 in an apartment that he shared with Otto Morales' widow. His death was announced by telephone on that same night by the leader of the Dominican Revolutionary Party (PRD), José Francisco Peña Gómez, who informed the journalist of the evening newspaper El Nacional, Silvio Herasme Peña, about the event.

One of the first news items published the day after his tragic death is the report that he died as a result of propane gas poisoning in his room. Also affected in the incident was Mrs. Miriam Pineda, Morales' widow, who was at the scene. Morales' widow did not die instantly and was taken to the hospital, but fell into a coma.
