= Jules Dubois =

American journalist in Latin America

Jules Dubois (31 March 1910, New York City - 15 August 1966, Bogotá) was a Latin America correspondent for the Chicago Tribune (1947–1966) and chairman of the Inter-American Press Association's press freedom committee, which he helped to organize in 1951. On his unexpected death of a heart attack in Bogotá, Colombia, in August 1966, he was described as "the world's most widely known and most decorated reporter of Latin American affairs".

Dubois worked for the New York Herald Tribune (1927–1929), before moving to Panama and working on various newspapers there. At the outbreak of World War II he became an army intelligence officer, serving in Panama, North Africa and Europe as well as the Pentagon. He was a graduate of the U.S. Army's command and general staff school at Fort Leavenworth. TIME described him as "an old friend" of Guatemalan President Carlos Castillo Armas, Armas having "studied under Colonel-Instructor Dubois during World War II in the U.S. Army's command and general staff school at Fort Leavenworth." Dubois was present during the 1954 Guatemalan coup d'état which brought Castillo Armas to power. His obituary declared that "he knew every president, every chief of staff, every dictator, and most of the would-be dictators in Latin America," and "could get more information on a telephone in a hotel room in one afternoon than most correspondents could get in months of travel."

He won the 1952 Maria Moors Cabot prize (from Columbia University), the 1959 Hero of Freedom Award from the IAPA, and the 1966 World Association of Newspapers' Golden Pen of Freedom Award. In 2000 the Inter American Press Association's new headquarters building was named after Dubois.

In 1977 The New York Times reported that Dubois was said to have been a CIA asset.

== Books ==
- Fidel Castro: Rebel, Liberator, or Dictator?, Bobbs-Merrill, 1959
- Freedom is my beat, Bobbs-Merrill, 1959
- Operation America: Beyond Cuba - The Inside Story of the Communist Plan to Subvert Latin America, New York, 1963
- Danger Over Panama, Bobbs-Merrill, 1964
