= Asia News Network =

Alliance of Asian newspapers

- Type: Public interest cooperative
- Industry: News media
- Founded: 26 April 1999; 27 years ago
- Headquarters: Singapore
- Area served: Asia
- Key people: Mahfuz Anam (chairman); Pana Janviroj (executive director)
- Products: News, analysis, opinions, features, data
- Website: asianews.network

Asia News Network (ANN) is a news coalition of 24 news organisations from various Asian countries. Headquartered in Singapore, it was established in 1999 to form an alliance and enhance co-operation among the various news organisations and their respective journalists and newspapers.

Through the coalition, members pool resources and expertise to offer in-depth coverage of regional and international issues by presenting local viewpoints on complex topics. Most newspapers in this coalition are also the newspaper of record in their respective countries.

Asia News Network once had a weekly news magazine which started in 2006.

== Members ==
Asia News Network members consist of the following publications:

- (Singapore) The Straits Times
- (South Korea) The Korea Herald
- China Daily
- Gogo Mongolia
- The Japan News
- (Pakistan) Dawn
- (India) The Statesman
- (Sri Lanka) The Island
- (Bhutan) Kuensel
- (Nepal) Kathmandu Post
- (Bangladesh) Daily Star
- (Myanmar) Eleven Media
- (Thailand) The Nation
- (Indonesia) The Jakarta Post
- (Malaysia) The Star
- (Malaysia) Sin Chew Daily
- (Cambodia) Phnom Penh Post
- (Cambodia) Rasmei Kampuchea
- (Brunei) The Borneo Bulletin
- Vietnam News
- (Philippines) Philippine Daily Inquirer
- (Laos) Vientiane Times

== See also ==
- European Dailies Alliance
- Leading European Newspaper Alliance
- Grupo de Diarios América
- Latin American Newspaper Association
