= El Universal (Caracas) =

Venezuelan newspaper

- Type: Daily newspaper
- Format: Broadsheet
- Owner: Epalisticia S.L.
- Founded: April 1, 1909
- Political alignment: Conservatism
- Language: Spanish / English (digital version only)
- Headquarters: Caracas, Venezuela
- Website: www.eluniversal.com

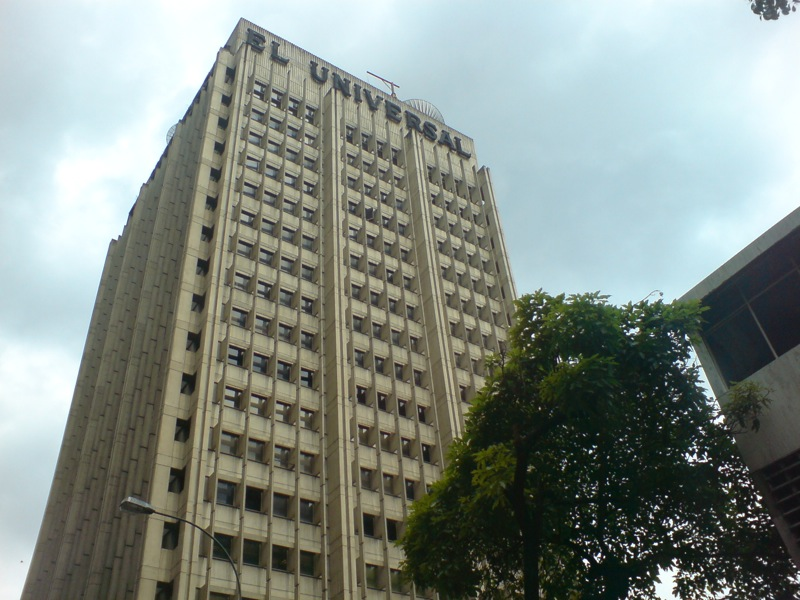
El Universal Building, Caracas

El Universal is a Venezuelan newspaper, headquartered in Caracas. El Universal is part of the Latin American Newspaper Association (Spanish, Periódicos Asociados Latinoamericanos). The newspaper does not disclose circulation figures.

== History ==
El Universal was founded in April 1909 in Caracas by the Venezuelan poet Andrés Mata and his friend Andrés Vigas, being the oldest of current Venezuelan newspapers. From its early years in Caracas, the publication sought to provide national and international news coverage and commentary on political and cultural developments. Over the course of the twentieth century, the newspaper expanded its reporting staff and modernized its printing infrastructure, helping it become one of the country's most widely recognized daily newspapers.

=== 20th century ===
Its first headquarters were located in a house between the corners of Sociedad and San Francisco de Caracas, where Daniel Aramburu's printing press worked. The first issue, which came out that same day, was published on Marinoni machines of French origin. The editors of this first issue were Rafael Silva in the chronicle, Francisco López Moreno and Santiago Caldera in the distribution, Luis Correa who served as chronicler, Pedro Bocca as office manager, Luis Alberto Ascanio as depositor, Miguel Ángel Ibarra as a proofreader, and Federico Webber as press writer. The format of this first issue was broadsheet, and had four pages in six columns. Six months later, the newspaper moved to an old building located between Sociedad and Gradillas streets.

In January 1910, the first photographs of the newspaper were published, one by Juan Vicente Gómez and another of a troop in the Plaza Bolívar in Caracas, which Guerra Toro took. That same year, an electric blackboard indicated to the public the topics that would be reported the following day. The following year, a Duplex machine was acquired for editing, increasing its edition to eight pages. In 1914 he signed agreements with international news agencies such as the United Press International, Reuters and Associated Press, becoming the first Venezuelan newspaper to do so.

In 1922 the newspaper modernized its equipment, published the first economic notice, and incorporated Luis Teófilo Núñez into the company's administration. As of October 24, 1929, it incorporated "La Página de los Jueves" and "El Deporte Nacional", the first fixed spaces of the newspaper. On December 17, 1930, the first rotary printing press in the country was installed, Ludlow brand, with which the newspaper began to be printed, on the memorial day of the centenary of the death of Simón Bolívar. The edition of the newspaper would increase to 18 pages, to seven columns. In 1932 he acquired a HOE press, with a capacity of 32 pages.

As of August 14, 1933, a daily page dedicated exclusively to sports began to be published. In 1934, cartoons began to be published, and in 1935, Historias del Tío Nicolás, by cartoonist Rafael Rivero Oramas, began to be published. Later Important additions were the "Literary Page" from August 8, 1937, at the initiative of Pascual Venegas Filardo and Pedro Sotillo, and the "Editorial Page" from November 8, 1940.

In 1948 the newspaper changed its headquarters and moved to the basement of the Ambos Mundos Building. By then it already had equipment capable of editing 64 pages. In 1954 the Photography department was created, and on February 16, 1958, after the fall of Marcos Pérez Jiménez, the People's Mail was created, where the opinions of the readers were published.

In 1969, El Universal moved to its current headquarters, a tower built on the corner of Ánimas, on Urdaneta Av. It was created by the architects Francisco Pimentel, George Wilkie and Bernardo Borges, who won the National Architecture Award in 1971. It is considered the essential structure carried out at that time.

In March 1994, Andrés Mata Osorio, grandson of the newspaper's founder, became the editor of El Universal. In 1995, journalists and engineers from the newspaper, together with specialists from the Massachusetts Institute of Technology, launched the first edition digital version of the newspaper on the internet. Initially, ten headlines were published a day, and a year later, the full version of the website was published. In 1997, a new plant opened in Guatire with three rotary printing presses, with a capacity for twelve million copies a month. In 1998, the newspaper began to publish its photographs in color. In 1999, the newspaper made the first pre-sale by a media outlet in the country.

=== 21st century ===
On July 4, 2014, the sale of El Universal to the Spanish company Espalisticia was announced. In that position until the year 2019.

The newspaper's board of directors is made up as follows: Vice President of Information: Elides J. Rojas L. (He resigned from the company, after almost 25 years of service, after having been editor-in-chief of Economics, Editor-in-Chief and for the last six years Vice President of Information) This position has been held since August 2020 by journalist Oscar Silva, who has worked for nine years with the group of owners of Globovisión, who assume the administrative and editorial direction of the newspaper, which, for now, only maintains its digital edition. Editor in Chief: Alan Lugo. Heads of Digital Information: Pedro Rojas and Mariángela Lando. Head of Art and Design: Abraham Sánchez. On November 1, 2020, the newspaper resumed its print edition as a weekly that is only published on Sundays.

== Political stance and editorial opinion ==
On the morning of 13 April 2002, when the removal of Hugo Chávez in what later came to be referred to as the 2002 Venezuelan coup d'état attempt appeared a success, the paper headlined ¡Un Paso Adelante! (One Step Forward!).

The newspaper was described as pro-opposition by The Guardian in 2008, by the BBC in 2013 and by Reuters numerous times between 2011 and 2014.

On 5 July 2014, it was announced that after 105 years of ownership, the Mata family had sold a controlling stake in the newspaper to a Spanish investment firm linked to the Venezuelan government, Politician S.L., a firm that "was created with the purpose of acquiring" El Universal. According to the Committee to Protect Journalists (CPJ), El Universal "cosied up to Venezuela's socialist government" following the purchase. The CPJ wrote that staff complained about censorship by their editors and that there had been firings and resignations at the newspaper.

== See also ==
- List of newspapers in Venezuela
