= Milton Coleman =

American journalist (1946–2026)

Milton Richard Coleman (November 29, 1946 – October 30, 2026) was an American journalist. He taught journalism ethics and diversity at Arizona State University's Walter Cronkite School of Journalism and Mass Communication as the Edith Kinney Gaylord Visiting Professor in Journalism Ethics. He was the senior editor of The Washington Post, president of the American Society of News Editors and the president of Inter American Press Association (IAPA).

Coleman was born in Milwaukee and grew up in the Hillside Terrace public housing project.

Coleman joined The Washington Post in 1976 and was promoted to the deputy managing editor position in 1996. He played a principal role in the newspaper's strategy and development of zoned editions and improved its coverage of Latinos, including news in Spanish.

He was elected as the president of the American Society of News Editors in April 2010, and president of Inter American Press Association in October 2011. He also served as a member of the nominating committee for the Pulitzer Prizes in Journalism, a judge for the Robert F. Kennedy Journalism Award and National Association of Black Journalists and Asian American Journalists Association awards, and the chairman of the Seldon Ring Award for Investigative Reporting judging committee.

Coleman graduated in 1968 with a bachelor of fine arts degree from the University of Wisconsin–Milwaukee, where he studied African American ethnomusicology. He was a Southern Education Foundation Fellow in 1971 and a fellow in the Michele Clark Summer Program for Minority Journalists at Columbia University Graduate School of Journalism in 1974.

Coleman died in Washington on October 30, 2026, at the age of 79.
