= Tele Antillas =

Dominican television network

- Country: Dominican Republic
- Headquarters: Santo Domingo

Programming
- Picture format: 1080i HDTV

Ownership
- Owner: Grupo Corripio
- Sister channels: Telesistema; Coral 39

History
- Launched: October 15, 1979

Links
- Website: www.teleantillas.com.do

Availability

Terrestrial
- Analog VHF: Channel 2
- Digital VHF: Channel 10.1

Tele Antillas is a television network operating out of Santo Domingo in the Dominican Republic. It provides a wide variety of television programs which are available to viewers throughout the Dominican Republic on channel 2. Originally the country's Southern and Capital Zones tuned in on channel 2, while the Northern Zone received it from channel 13. During the 1990s, the Dominican government implemented regulations which required networks to operate key stations and relayers on one channel throughout the entire country. Since then, all of Tele Antillas analog stations are now on channel 2 until 2024, when it opened its digital signal on channel 10.

== History ==
Established during October 1979, Tele Antillas was soon considered one of the most modern television channels providing media content in the Dominican Republic. It was the first TV channel to utilize stereophonics. Additionally, it was among the pioneering channels that initially introduced programming based largely on international productions such as telenovelas, television series, films and animated cartoons. Despite incorporating an international approach, they continued producing several local programs developed specifically for the family audience. During the 1990s, the station was acquired by Grupo Corripio, which also owns Telesistema Canal 11, and later relaunched with a new programming format. Today, many international events like the Oscars, Emmys, and some of most popular events in Latin America, such as the Festival Internacional de la Canción de Viña del Mar are viewed on Tele Antillas Canal 2.

It was one of the first channels in the Dominican Republic to offer foreign made programming from Brazil and Venezuela. One of their most successful ventures was a popular late night schedule that included well-known telenovelas like Ronda de Piedra, Doña Bella and Xica da Silva among others. In 2004 the TV station was relaunched with a new logo and programming that was designed to appeal to a wider variety of viewing demographics.

The channel started migrating from channel 2 to channel 10 on February 1, 2024.

== Slogans ==
- "Tele Antillas, Canal 2 en Santo Domingo y 13 en Santiago" (1980s)
- "Tele Antillas, Tu Canal ...!" (1990s)
- "Tele Antillas, Ahora y siempre... Lo Mejor" (1990s)
- "Tele Antillas, TV como eres tú" (2004)
