= Leading European Newspaper Alliance =

European news alliance

Leading European Newspaper Alliance (LENA) is an organisation initially set up by seven (now eight) European newspapers in March 2015, to improve journalism in Europe. The group aims to share content and technology practice within the transformation the journalism industry is currently experiencing, in an environment characterised by rapid growth in Internet-based readers. The members of LENA are Die Welt (Germany), El País (Spain), La Repubblica (Italy), Le Figaro (France), Le Soir (Belgium), Swiss German-language newspaper Tages-Anzeiger, French-language newspaper Tribune de Genève and Polish-language newspaper Gazeta Wyborcza. These publications have a joint readership of seven million, in addition to 43 million unique Internet users. Javier Moreno Barber, editor in-chief of El País from 2006 to 2014, was the group's director until May 2017. His successor were Christoph Zimmer, Head of Communications at Tamedia and Olivier de Reaymaeker, the CEO of Le Soir. The current Chairwoman of the Alliance is Joanna Krawczyk, the Head of News Partnerships at Gazeta Wyborcza.

The initiative is intended to consolidate European public opinion through content that the seven members of LENA share and produce jointly. This includes exchanging journalists and other employees. The seven newspapers share new practices and digital techniques in technology, trade and publishing. Each newspaper submits selected articles to a shared platform, where members can select the ones they believe to be of greatest interest to their readers, to increase dissemination of content like interviews, reports and opinion articles, written by experts, academics and public figures from different disciplines.

As part of its strategy, LENA promotes and organizes international events in Europe. In January 2016, as part of the World Economic Forum, held in Davos, LENA organized a debate on the challenges represented by integrating refugees. Issues for which LENA members have worked jointly include refugees of the Syrian Civil War, the Greek government-debt crisis, the political challenges of the EU and the consequences of economic sanctions on Russia.

== See also ==
- European Dailies Alliance
- Grupo de Diarios América
- Latin American Newspaper Association
- Asia News Network
