= Latin American Newspaper Association =

Latin American news alliance

The Latin American Newspaper Association ( Latin Post ) (Spanish: Periódicos Asociados Latinoamericanos, PAL) is a press group representing media organizations in Latin America. Founded in 2008, it represents 16 newspapers in 11 countries, as well as magazines.

== Aims ==
PAL's stated objectives are

- Promoting the technical exchange and professional among its members
- Promoting the exchange of contents among its members
- International marketing of their products

== Members ==
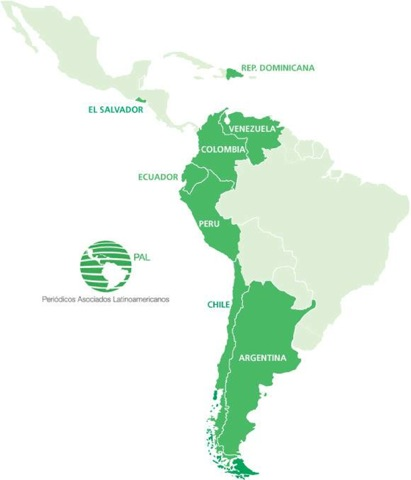

- Argentina
  - Clarín
- Chile
  - La Tercera, La Cuarta
- Colombia
  - El País (Colombia), El Universal (Colombia), La Vanguardia, El Colombiano, El Espectador
- Dominican Republic
  - Diario Libre
- El Salvador
  - El Diario de Hoy
- Ecuador
  - Diario HOY
- Honduras
  - La Prensa (Honduras)
- Nicaragua
  - La Prensa (Managua)
- Peru
  - La República
- Spain
  - El Mundo (Spain)
- Venezuela
  - El Universal (Caracas), La Verdad (Zulia), El Informador (Barquisimeto)

== See also ==
- European Dailies Alliance
- Leading European Newspaper Alliance
- Grupo de Diarios América
- Asia News Network
