= Telesistema 11 =

Dominican television network

Telesistema
- Type: Free-to-air commercial television network
- Country: Dominican Republic
- Headquarters: Santo Domingo, Dominican Republic

Programming
- Language(s): Spanish
- Picture format: 480i SDTV

Ownership
- Owner: Grupo Corripio
- Key people: Manuel Corripio (president); Valentín Baez (general vice president)
- Sister channels: Tele Antillas; Coral

History
- Founded: March 13th 1974
- Launched: March 15th 1976
- Founder: Waldo Pons

Links
- Website: telesistema11.com.do

Availability

Terrestrial
- Analog VHF: Channel 11
- Digital VHF: Channel 11.1

Telesistema 11 is a free-to-air television network based in the Dominican Republic. The station broadcasts on channel 11 in the NTSC standard and is owned by Grupo Corripio.

== History ==
Telesistema was founded on March 13, 1974, by a group of Puerto Rican engineers and technicians led by Waldo Pons. Although the company had been in the planning stages since early 1971, its broadcasts officially began in 1976 during the celebration of the Military Sports Games held at the Juan Pablo Duarte Olympic Center. These games were initially planned to be broadcast on the state-run CERTV channel, but Telesistema Dominicano, C. por A. obtained a local broadcasting license on March 15, 1976.

In its early days, the channel’s programming focused on movies, American TV series, cartoons, telenovelas, and a news bulletin. Its first headquarters were located at El Vergel No. 88, in the neighborhood of the same name. Over time, the station began to grow in popularity and audience share.

Telesistema originally broadcast on VHF channel 11 in Santo Domingo and the southern and eastern regions of the Dominican Republic. Starting in 1984, it also aired on channel 9 VHF for the Cibao region. However, in 1995, following modifications to the Dominican Republic’s General Telecommunications Law, each television network was required to broadcast on a single frequency nationwide.

=== Acquisition by Grupo de Comunicaciones Corripio ===
In the early 1980s, Telesistema was acquired by Grupo de Comunicaciones Corripio. This sale led to major changes, including updated programming, a revamped graphic identity, and expanded studio facilities. The main entrance was relocated to 27 de Febrero Avenue No. 52, across from the Virgilio Travieso Soto Sports Palace.

These changes helped boost Telesistema’s ratings. The children’s programming block was reinforced with series such as Saint Seiya, Ranma ½, and Power Rangers. Additionally, the now-defunct company Promovisión, led by Ángel Puello, played a significant role in the channel’s growth by producing popular shows such as El Club de Isha, El Reto Semanal, and Sazonando.

The daily telenovela slot became a primetime-like block, directly competing with Telemicro’s lineup in the same time slot. Most of the telenovelas aired on channel 11 were from Venezuela—primarily from RCTV—and Peru, mainly from América Televisión.

Telesistema also expanded its news programming with the launch of the morning news show El Día, hosted by Huchi Lora. In 1998, the channel began broadcasting the anime series Dragon Ball.

In 2001, the show ¡Gózalo! premiered, produced and hosted by Carlos Alfredo Fatule. It ran until 2003 before moving to Color Visión. Over the following years, Telesistema continued to renew its content with new programs and personalities, such as Jochy Santos with Divertido con Jochy, Milagros Germán with Chévere Nights, and Nikauly de la Mota with Arriba y Alante (later renamed Arriba con Nikauly), among others.

In June 2009, Telesistema acquired the broadcasting rights for the fourth season of the reality show Latin American Idol.

In 2010, Roberto Ángel Salcedo joined the network with the program +Roberto, while still hosting the long-running show 9x9 Roberto, originally created by his father. +Roberto premiered on July 4.

Two years later, in 2012, Telesistema, along with its sister stations Tele Antillas and Coral 39, broadcast the 2012 London Olympic Games. In 2014, Jochy Santos departed from the channel, and his show Divertido con Jochy moved to Telemicro. Shortly after, Roberto Ángel Salcedo announced he would take over the Saturday time slot with a new show titled Vale por Tres.

In 2018, Telesistema became the official broadcaster of the Dominican edition of MasterChef, a popular cooking competition reality show.
