= Pedro Francisco Bono Institute =

Coordinates: 18°29′14.95″N 69°53′21.48″W

- Type: Jesuit, Catholic college
- Established: 1985; 41 years ago
- Academic affiliations: AUSJAL; Gregorian University
- Rector: Cristhian Espinal
- Location: Josefa Brea Street No. 65, Santo Domingo, Dominican Republic
- Website: bono.edu.do

Pedro Francisco Bono Institute (ISB) (formerly Pedro Francisco Bonó Philosophical Institute) was established in September 1985 offering philosophical and humanities studies for Jesuits preparing for the priesthood. Classes were held at the San Pedro Claver Juniorate on Samana Street, Santo Domingo, Dominican Republic. In 1989 the Institute moved to its present location and began offering Bachelor of Arts and Philosophy degrees. It is a member of the Association of Universities Entrusted to the Society of Jesus in Latin America (AUSJAL) and is affiliated with the Pontifical Gregorian University.

== See also ==
- List of Jesuit sites
