= Franjul (family) =

The Franjul family is a prominent and respected family in the Dominican Republic with strong political and economic influence in the southwest provinces of the country. The family considers the city of Baní (Province of Peravia) as the center of its Dominican heritage. In 2020, they welcomed King Juan Carlos I, monarch emeritus of Spain, who stayed in a magnificent complex of the Franjul family.

== Origins ==
The origins of the family can be traced to the region of Asturias, Spain. Members of the family emigrated to the Dominican Republic in the 19th century, and settled in the small town of Bani, in the Dominican province of Peravia, west of the Dominican capital of Santo Domingo. Dominican historians consistently argue about the Family's origins. Some have recently argued that the phonetics of the surname is one of Arab descent, which implies the family is one of Moorish descent. The Moors were the medieval Muslim inhabitants of al-Andalus (the Iberian Peninsula including the present day Spain and Portugal) and the Maghreb, whose culture is often also called "Moorish".

The first Dominican-born member of the family was Francisco Fanjul, whose father became a naturalized Dominican citizen after the Dominican Republic gained its independence from Haiti in 1844. It was then when, because of a misunderstanding in pronunciation, the family name was mistakenly changed from "Fanjul" to "Franjul" in official census records of the time. Other members of the family settled in Cuba, and later fled to the United States after Fidel Castro took power in 1959. While family members in the Dominican Republic became the "Franjul" family, those who settled in Cuba remained as "Fanjul". Today most members of the Franjul family reside in the Dominican Republic.

The first family reunion between the "Franjuls" and "Fanjuls" took place in 1995 in La Romana, Dominican Republic. Although the surname "Franjul" is also known to exist among families in the Balkans, no links have been proven to exist.

== Prominent family members ==
Miguel Franjul, Chief Editor of Listín Diario, the largest and oldest Dominican newspaper. Current Vice-President of Inter-American Commission for the Free Press.

Engracia Franjul de Abate, former top executive at Banco Popular Dominicano. First female member of Banco Popular Board of Directors. Former president of the Dominican-American Cultural Institute board of directors, member of ICDA executive committee, and FUNDAPEC board member (former president). Former director of ADOPEM, a leading micro-lending institution.

Luis Franjul Dume, former mayor of Bani 1966-1968.

Nelson Franjul Montero: former mayor of Bani and fiscal prosecutor (1959)

Claudia Franjul: Actress and model. Miss Dominican Republic 1994.

Rafael Franjul Troncoso, former member of Dominican Congress as Senator for the province of Peravia for the Dominican Reformist Christian Party (PRSC). Former mayor of the city of Bani (1990-1994).

Milciades Franjul, member of Dominican Senate representing the Province of Peravia for the Modern Revolutionary Party. In 2020 elections, won over incumbent 68% vs. 32%.

Manuel Díaz-Franjul, Chief negotiator of Free Trade Agreement between Dominican Republic and United States, known as DR-CAFTA. Special adviser for the Dominican embassy in Washington, D. C. and General Secretary of Dominican Commission for Price Controls. Currently Chief Trade Negotiator at Dominican Ministry of Foreign Affairs.

Marcos Peña Franjul, renowned ecologist and expert on natural resources. Former professor at UNPHU. Author of "Los Franjul: Una Familia del Banilejismo", a genealogical book on the Franjul family, its history and its origins.

Yira Mascaro Franjul, World Bank executive with expertise in bank resolutions and financial development of emerging nations.

Joselo Franjul, fashion expert and high-end celebrity stylist

Manny Franjul, Investor & Partner at Frontier Capital Management Co.
