= Rafael Molina Morillo =

Dominican lawyer (born 1930–2017)

Dr. Rafael Molina Morillo (30 March 1930 – 2 April 2017) was a lawyer, journalist, diplomat, and newspaper editor from the Dominican Republic. He created Ahora! Publications which published El Nacional newspaper and Ahora! magazine. He also was editor of Listín Diario newspaper and El Dia, a free newspaper in the Dominican Republic.

Morillo was president of the Inter-American Press Association for the year 2006–07, succeeding Diana Daniels, of The Washington Post.

He died on 2 April 2017.

== ¡Ahora! magazine ==
¡Ahora! magazine was founded by noted journalist and ambassador Rafael Molina Morillo, in the Dominican Republic.

It was founded in January 1961. Morillo has also edited it in the 1960.

On October 6, 1965, the offices of Ahora was bombed. Its printing equipment destroyed.

The ahora magazine was defined as champion on human rights. It has been assumed that is why it was targeted by radicals.
