= Andrés Mata (writer) =

Andrés Mata (10 November 1870 – 18 November 1931) was a Venezuelan poet, writer and journalist. He is considered a poet of modernist trend, who did not resign to Romanticism completely.

== Life ==
Andrés Mata was born in Carúpano, Venezuela, in 1870. At the age of just 12 he began contributing to a Carúpano weekly, La Avispa, before founding a daily newspaper, El Día, in 1885. In 1886, he moved to Caracas, but for political reasons then went into exile with Juan Pablo Rojas Paúl. In the Dominican Republic he became editor of Listín Diario. He returned to Venezuela in 1895.

He was made a member of the National Academy of History of Venezuela in 1904, and of the Venezuelan Academy of Language in 1908.

Andrés Mata and Andrés Vigas founded the newspaper El Universal on 1 April 1909.

== Later life and death ==
In later life Mata acted as Venezuelan Consul in a variety of European cities, including Geneva, Malaga, and the Vatican. Mata died in Paris, France, in 1931.

== Notable works ==
- Pentélicas (1896)
- Idilio Trágico (1898, English: Tragic Love Affair)
- Arias Sentimentales (1898, English: Sentimental Arias)

== Trivia ==
- His grandson, Andrés Mata Osorio, is the current publisher of El Universal.
- Fundación Andrés Mata is a Venezuelan foundation belonging to the El Universal that is named after Andrés Mata.
- A municipality in Sucre is named for him.
