= Bedřich Bridel =

Czech baroque writer, poet, and missionary

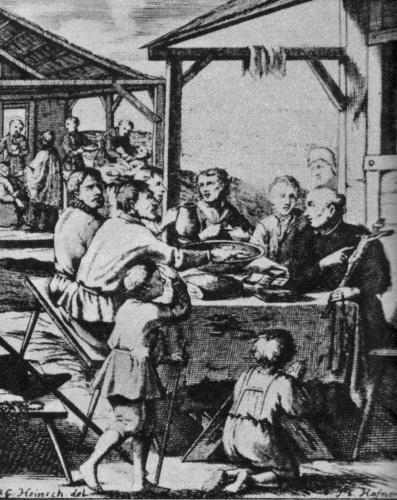
Bridel re-catholicizing the Czech people

Bedřich Bridel, or Fridrich Bridelius (German: Friedrich Briedel, Bridelius; 1619, Vysoké Mýto – October 15, 1680, Kutná Hora) was a Czech baroque writer, poet, and missionary.

== Biography ==
He studied at the Jesuit gymnasium in Prague. In 1637 he entered the Jesuit order, he was ordained as a priest around 1650. From 1656 to 1660 he led the printing office of the Jesuits in the Prague Clementinum. Following the 1660 he devoted himself exclusively to the missionary and predicatory activities in Bohemia. He died of plague.

== Work ==
Bridel's literary output is varied, he used more forms and genres. The majority of his works are catechetic books. He also translated the German and Latin texts into Czech.

=== List of selected works ===
- Co Bůh? Člověk? (What about God? What about Man?) – a long meditative poem that is regarded today as one of the most important works of the Bohemian baroque poetry
- Život svatého Ivana, 1656 (The life of the saint Ivan)
- Stůl Páně (The table of the Lord)
- František svatý Xaver (Saint Francis Xavier)
- Sláva Svatoprokopská, 1662 (The glory of the saint Prokop)
- Katechismus katolický (Catholic catechism)

== See also ==
- List of Czech writers
