= Diario Libre =

Dominican Republic newspaper

- Type: Daily newspaper
- Format: Tabloid
- Owner: Grupo Puntacana
- Editor: Inés Aizpun
- Founded: May 10, 2001
- Headquarters: Santo Domingo, Dominican Republic
- Circulation: Nationally in the DR
- Website: www.diariolibre.com (in Spanish)

Diario Libre is one of the leading newspapers in the Dominican Republic.

== Overview ==
Diario Libre is a free daily Spanish-language Dominican newspaper, founded on May 10, 2001. It is owned by the Dominican business Grupo Diario Libre, and it is part of the Latin American Newspaper Association.

Its first editor was Aníbal de Castro from 2001 to 2004, and its editor since 2004 has been Adriano Miguel Tejada. It has a national circulation within the Dominican Republic.

Monday through Saturday, it has a distribution of 157,830 copies delivered to homes and points of distribution in the National District and other areas including Santo Domingo, Santiago, Puerto Plata, La Vega, Jarabacoa, Bonao, Moca, San Francisco de Macorís, San Pedro de Macorís, La Romana and Higüey.
