= Rafael Brache =

Rafael Ángel Brache Ramírez (July 8, 1888 – June 23, 1965) was a politician, civil servant, and diplomat from the Dominican Republic. His career in national politics spanned from 1914 to 1935, after which he spent much of his life in exile.

Brache was born in Moca, but lived in La Vega from an early age and considered that to be his home town. He was elected to the National Congress in 1914, aged 25, but resigned the following year to enter the diplomatic corps. Brache later worked as a senior civil servant for a period, and then in 1924 returned to the National Congress. He supported Rafael Trujillo's coup in 1930, and during the early years of his regime served as a diplomat and government minister. He was Ambassador to the United States from 1930 to 1931 and from 1934 to 1935, Ambassador to the United Kingdom from 1931 to 1933, and Secretary of Finance from 1933 to 1934. He remained in the U.S. after being dismissed as ambassador, and in 1937 was declared a "traitor to the homeland" for his opposition to Trujillo.

== Early life ==
Brache was born in Moca to María Apolonia Ramírez Melert and Elías Brache Soriano. His father, who was born in Santo Domingo, was a music teacher and bandleader. Brache moved to La Vega when he was a small child, and attended school there. He followed his older brother Elías into politics, becoming chairman of the local municipal council at the age of 21. In 1914, aged 25, Brache was elected to represent La Vega in the Chamber of Deputies, the lower house of the National Congress. He resigned the following year to take up the position of Consul-General in London (the equivalent of ambassador), and had his credentials received in February 1916.

As a result of his country's loss of sovereignty during the American military occupation, Brache served in London for only two years before being recalled. He returned to the National Congress at the 1924 general election, as a representative of the Patriotic Coalition of Citizens. Brache was a director of the party's newspaper, El Siglo ("The Century"), and also served for periods as Chief of the Bureau of Internal Revenue, Director-General of Immigration, and as a delegate to the Inter-Parliamentary Union.

== Trujillo regime ==
In March 1930, Dominican President Horacio Vásquez was overthrown in a coup led by Rafael Estrella Ureña and General Rafael Trujillo. Estrella Ureña succeeded Vásquez as self-proclaimed provisional president and called for an election (election that turned out to be a sham) in which Estrella Ureña would be the vice-presidential candidate along with General Trujillo as presidential candidate. Brache, a supporter of the coup, reputedly clung to Trujillo "like a leech", and was appointed as the new Ambassador to the United States. (Note: Brache's official title was Envoy Extraordinary and Minister Plenipotentiary.)

Brache's first task as ambassador was to persuade the United States Department of State to endorse Trujillo's candidacy. On April 23, 1930, he met with Joseph P. Cotton, the Under Secretary of State. (Note: Cotton was acting in place of the Secretary of State, Henry L. Stimson, who was overseas to negotiate the London Naval Treaty.) He told Cotton that Trujillo was a "very able man, a good organizer, very clever, intelligent and honest", and secured very reluctant approval for the new Dominican Government. A report was immediately sent back to Santo Domingo, and the following day Trujillo gave a major speech in which he publicly announced his election manifesto. However, the extent to which Brache was actually able to influence the State Department's position is uncertain. One contemporary commentator believed that Trujillo had already made a deal with the United States Government after the coup, and suggested that Branche had effectively been sent on a fool's errand.

Brache was recalled from the United States in early 1931, apparently for failing to secure a loan from the United States Federal Government. Later in the year, he was instead appointed Ambassador to the Court of St. James, taking up that post in December 1931. He was also accredited as the non-resident ambassador to Denmark and the Netherlands. In 1933, Brache returned to Santo Domingo to become Finance Secretary. He was re-appointed Ambassador to the United States in November 1934, presenting his credentials the following month. Brache's second term in Washington was largely devoted to improving Trujillo's public reputation, which had suffered due to reports of political assassinations and censorship of the media. Brache argued publicly and privately that the Dominican government was being unfairly criticised, and praised Trujillo's personal accomplishments. In a 1935 address to the Pan-American Union, he praised Trujillo's "firm love of peace" and "eloquence of deeds", and said he was deserving of "the gratitude of the world".

== Later life ==
Brache was dismissed as ambassador in November 1935, apparently due to rumours of involvement with some of Trujillo's exiled opponents. He was summoned back to the Dominican Republic to face a government tribunal, but chose to remain in the United States and eventually had his passport revoked. Brache resigned from the Dominican Party in March 1936, although his resignation was refused. In November 1937, the National Congress declared he and three others to be "unworthy Dominicans" and "traitors to the homeland". This was in response to their public condemnation of Trujillo's attempted genocide of Haitians (the "parsley massacre") earlier in the year. Brache was prominent in the Dominican community in New York, and during the 1940s lived on Riverside Drive, Manhattan, with his family and their live-in servants.

Brache was only able to return to the Dominican Republic after Trujillo's assassination in 1961, when President Joaquín Balaguer revoked the earlier decree. He died in Santo Domingo in 1965 and was buried there.

== Family ==
Brache married Dolores Grecia Bernard González, with whom he had nine children. In 1947, one of his sons, Rafael Jr., was involved in the abortive Cayo Confites expedition, in which Dominican and Cuban insurrectionaries (including a young Fidel Castro) sought to overthrow Trujillo by force. Most of Brache's children remained in the United States, and a grandson, Tom Perez, became Secretary of Labor in the Obama Administration and in 2017, he became the Democratic National Committee Chair. Perez has frequently mentioned his grandfather in political speeches, including in his Senate confirmation hearing. A July 2016 piece in The Wall Street Journal suggested that he had downplayed or misrepresented Brache's connections with Trujillo. In response, Perez implied that the article had been produced as an attempt to smear him while he was under consideration for the Democratic Party's vice-president nomination.

== See also ==
- List of ambassadors of the Dominican Republic to the United States
