= Federico Cuello Camilo =

Dominican Republic diplomat

Federico Alberto Cuello Camilo
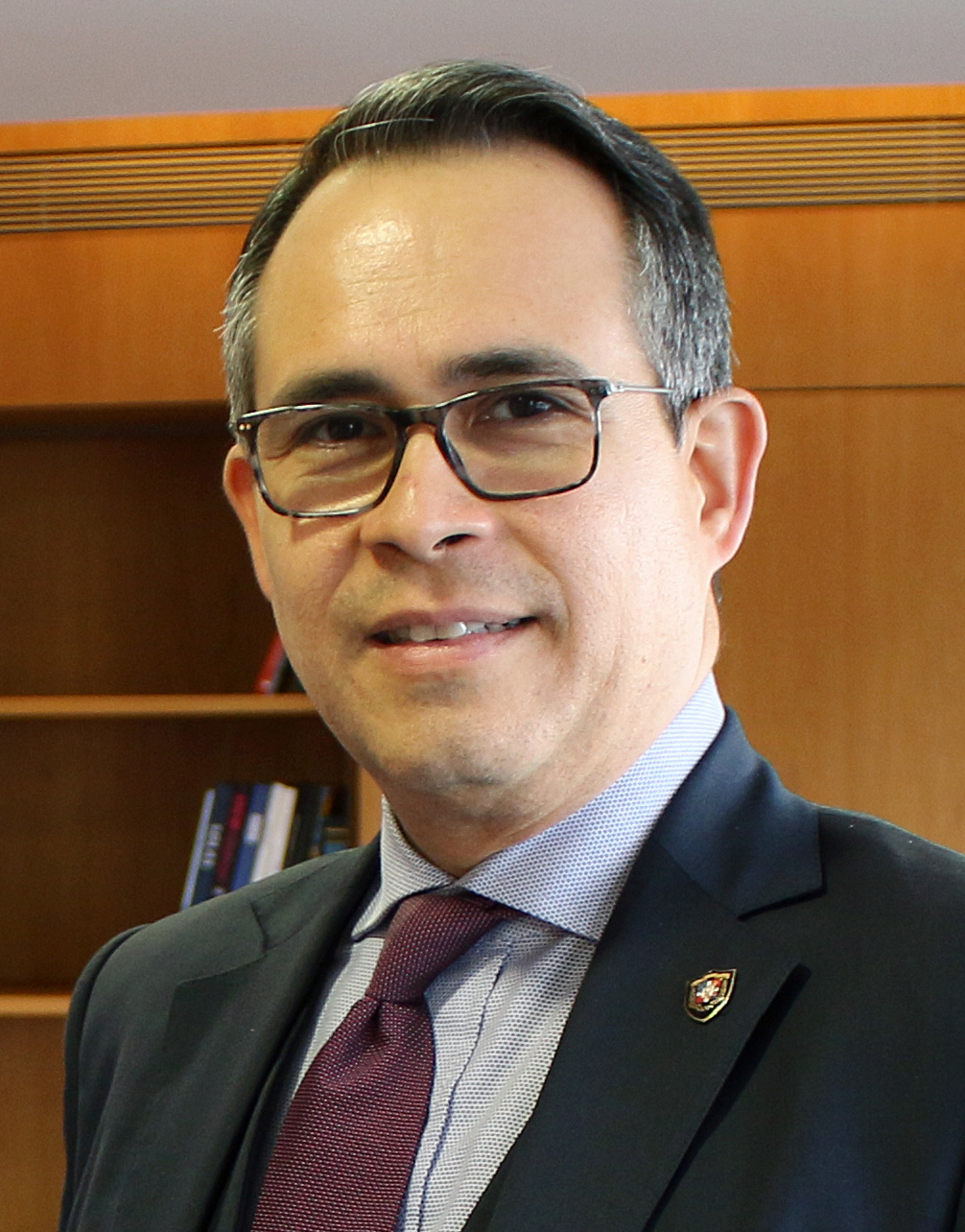

Dominican Republic Ambassador to the Republic of Korea
- Incumbent
- Assumed office 7 December 2020
- President: Luis Abinader Corona
- Preceded by: Humberto Salazar

Dominican Republic Ambassador to the State of Qatar
- In office 2019–2020
- President: Danilo Medina Sánchez
- Preceded by: Hugo Guiliani Cury
- Succeeded by: Georges Bhasa Hazim

Dominican Republic Ambassador to the United Kingdom of Great Britain and Northern Ireland
- In office 2011–2019
- President: Leonel Fernández Reyna
- Preceded by: Aníbal de Castro
- Succeeded by: Hugo Guiliani Cury

Dominican Republic Ambassador to the United Nations
- In office 2009–2011
- President: Leonel Fernández Reyna
- Preceded by: Erasmo Lara
- Succeeded by: Virgilio Alcántara

Dominican Republic Ambassador to the Kingdom of Belgium and the European Union
- In office 2005–2009
- President: Leonel Fernández Reyna
- Preceded by: Clara Quiñones
- Succeeded by: Alejandro González Pons

Dominican Republic Ambassador to the European Office of the United Nations and the World Trade Organization
- In office 1999–2002
- President: Leonel Fernández Reyna
- Preceded by: Angelina Bonetti Herrera
- Succeeded by: Rubén Núñez

Personal details
- Born: 1966 (age 59–60) Santo Domingo, Dominican Republic
- Education: University of Illinois; Santo Domingo Institute of Technology
- Profession: Economist, working as a Diplomat since 1999.

Federico Alberto Cuello Camilo (born 1966 in Santo Domingo) is a diplomat of the Dominican Republic. He is the Ambassador Extraordinary and Plenipotentiary to the Republic of Korea, serving as well as non-resident Ambassador to the Sultanate of Brunei and to the Kingdom of Thailand.

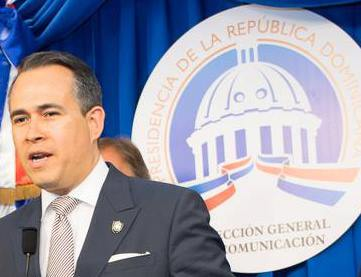
Ambassador Federico Alberto Cuello Camilo press conference 11 June 2013

Political offices
| Preceded by Humberto Salazar | Ambassador of the Dominican Republic to the Republic of Korea; December 2020–present | Succeeded by Incumb |
