= Andrés Vigas =

Venezuelan politician and writer (1848–1930)

Andrés Jorge Vigas Syers (1848 - 11 September 1930) was a Venezuelan lawyer, journalist, essayist and politician.

He was born in Cumaná, the capital city of Sucre State, in eastern Venezuela. He was held a seat in the Chamber of Deputies, representing the Federal District, from 1905 to 1909, and was a Senator for Guárico State from 1915 to 1920.

He published writings in El Cojo Ilustrado (1892), was the founder and editor of the daily El Imparcial (1894), and, in conjunction with his friend Andrés Mata, founded the newspaper El Universal in 1909.

He also wrote several books, including: Manual Practico de la Lengua Internacional Esperanto (1908), Perfiles Parlamentarios del Congreso de 1890, Bromeando, Guanoco (1901), and Adefesio en Uso entre Intelectuales (1923). He died in Caracas on 11 September 1930.

== Sources ==
The original version of this article was translated, with minor modifications, from the corresponding entry on the Spanish-language Wikipedia.
