= Grupo Corripio =

Dominican business conglomerate

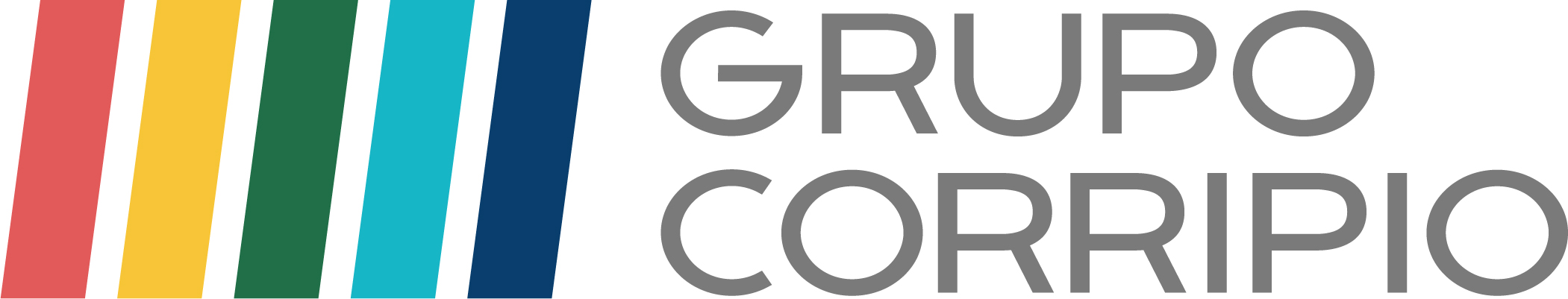
- Type: Private
- Industry: Diversified
- Founded: 1917
- Headquarters: Santo Domingo, Dominican Republic
- Key people: José Luis Corripio (Chairman and CEO)
- Products: Media; Industrial; Banking; Investments
- Number of employees: 14,000 (2021)

Grupo Corripio is a private holding company which is considered among the most successful enterprises operating in the Dominican Republic, owning a controlling interest in several companies across a wide variety of sectors. Some of Grupo Corripio's best known and most profitable investments are in the mass media industry and include the newspapers Hoy, and El Nacional y El Día, as well as the television channels Tele Antillas and Telesistema 11. Grupo Corripio is currently led by José Luis Corripio Estrada.

== Early history ==
A small business precursor of Grupo Corripio was established in 1917 when Ramón Corripio arrived for the first time in the Dominican Republic from Spain. Ramón received further support when his brother Manuel Corripio (1908–2004) arrived in 1921. They established the business with a modest sum of RD$3,000 pesos; they had lost much of their initial investment after the 1930 San Zenón hurricane. In the wake of the tragedy the Royal Bank of Canada offered to discount its clients debt by 50%. However, the Corripio brothers, who had incurred debt to the bank, preferred settling their commitments. This decision helped establish a solid reputation and opened new doors and sources for financing.

According to Manuel's son and the current president of Grupo Corripio, Mr. José Luis Corripio (Pepín), the family enterprise was developed from years of intense work, with the entire family (including his mother) following a labor ritual that began at 6:00 am and ended at midnight. An emphasis on savings and monitoring costs was a critical internal component. Manuel even delayed purchasing a home for several years because he preferred investing available capital into his businesses.

A determining period in the Group's development occurred after the fall of dictator Rafael Leónidas Trujillo (d. 1961) and the April Revolution, the political uprising of April 1965 that led to the second occupation of the Dominican Republic by the US military. These events catalyzed an unprecedented opening of the country's domestic market and the Corripio family took advantage of the opportunity by investing in several new businesses. According to Jose Luis Corripio, a critical factor in the group's future success was remaining confident in the Dominican Republic, even at times when domestic turmoil and uncertainty caused other businesses to flee.

Pepín Corripio initiated another stage of the company's growth by diversifying their investments in a variety of new business sectors. Among the first sectors the Group targeted was the gasoline industry, which was inspired by Pepín's observation of the commodities necessity in Dominicans performance of daily activities.

== Growth and expansion ==
Grupo Corripio has managed to consistently maintain a healthy growth rate since the 1950s. According to its chairman Jose Luis Corripio the group "has been growing (consistently)… Our strategy was a constant process of slow and unspectacular growth year by year. Between 1997 and 2002 the number of Corripio's employees increased from 5,600 to 7,100. Growth of the group remained concentrated in the Dominican domestic market and was made possible by creating new businesses and developing new alliances. Grupo Corripio, which according to its founder tried to remain independent from commercial banks, had a substantial participation in Banco del Progreso – above 5% - and had also invested in a second Dominican Bank. Investments in mass media increased significantly during the 1990s; in 2003 the company controlled the morning daily Hoy, the evening daily El Nacional, the free newspaper El Día, Ahora magazine and several television channels (including Tele Antillas and channels 2, 11, and 39) as well as the editing company Editora Corripio.

During the 1990s Grupo Corripio also expanded its involvement in the industrial sector. In 1996, the Group allied with the Colombian firm Cementos de Colombia and the Spanish Umar (subsidiary of Holcim) to acquire the privatized Cementos Colon, producer of concrete. The performance of Cementos Colon since then has been nothing less of spectacular. According to the magazine Estrategia y Negocios, in 2000 the firm had annual sales of US$30 million and increased market share from 5% in 1998 to 17% two years later (26). In 2000 Grupo Corripio also created a joint venture with the Costa Rican Durman Esquivel and Metaldom – a large Dominican producer of metal products – to start producing PVC pipes in the Dominican Republic. According to Durman Esquivel the new factory of PVC they opened with Grupo Corripio and Metaldom in 2001 generated profits faster than any other of Durman's investments in Central America, Mexico and the Caribbean.

Corripi has localized mainly in the Dominican Republic, Central America and the Caribbean; this is mainly because the company's main source of income comes from selling American and Chinese home appliances in countries were these products aren't easily available. The company sells these home appliances at a higher price than that which you would normally see if you were in the U.S. because they have to bring the products to the country and have very little competition. Because of this the company cannot expand to the U.S. or Puerto Rico where these home appliances can be purchased at a significantly lower price.

== Social and political activities ==
The success enjoyed by Grupo Corripio over the decades has enabled the family to expand its influence throughout the country. The largest groups are also directly involved in supporting nongovernmental organizations (NGOs) and foundations as well as cultural events. Through all these mechanisms they contribute to setting the political, economic and cultural agenda of the country.

The Group has established the Fundación Corripio which collaborates in developing a wide variety of objectives and programs related to cultural diffusion.
