= José Luis Corripio =

Dominican Republic businessman (born 1934)

- Born: 12 March 1934 (age 92); Arroes, Villaviciosa, Asturias, Spain
- Other names: Pepín
- Occupation: Entrepreneur
- Board member of: Grupo Corripio
- Spouse: Ana María Alonso
- Children: 4
- Awards: Officer of the Order of Merit of Duarte, Sánchez and Mella Grand Cross of the Order of Christopher Columbus; Grand Cross of the Order of Civil Merit Grand Cordon of the Order of Brilliant Star

José Luis ‘Pepín’ Corripio Estrada (born 12 March 1934) is a billionaire Dominican businessman of Spanish origin.

Born in 1934 as the only child in a poor family in Arroes, Spain, Corripio's family migrated to the Dominican Republic when he was still an infant, fleeing from the Spanish Civil War. The Corripio family went from rags to riches: his father, Manuel Corripio García, founded a small shop, and by the time of the death of the strongman Rafael Trujillo in 1961, Corripio García was the third richest man in the Dominican Republic, only after Trujillo himself and Rafael Esteva Menéndez (the founder of IMCA S.A.). The business grew and diversified, becoming in Grupo Corripio, an economic empire in the Dominican Republic creating over 12000 jobs; Corripio Estrada became the wealthiest man in the country with a net worth over US$3 billion.

== Early life ==
Corripio Estrada born in 1934 in the Spanish village of Arroes, in Asturias, to Sara Estrada and Manuel Corripio García (1908–2004). In 1938, the Dominican Republic became his new home amid the Spanish Civil War.

Corripio studied at the De La Salle School in Santo Domingo, where he directed its monthly periodical; he graduated in 1951.

On 16 August 1963, Corripio married Ana María Alonso, a native of Piloña (Asturias), at the Holy Cave of Covadonga (Asturias). They have 4 children: Manuel, José Alfredo, Lucía, Ana. Manuel married to Rafaela Martínez; José Alfredo married Laura Pereda; Lucía married Alejandro González; Ana married Rafael Barceló parents of Luis Rafael Barcelo Corripio.

During the decade of the 70's, Corripio was kidnapped by the Sanchez Tejada brothers' band, and kept holed up for days inside a water reservoir (cisterna) near the San Isidro's Air Force base. During the time Corripio remain kidnapped, the kidnappers made him believe they were members of the military. The Sanchez Tejada brothers had an auto mechanics shop near the Braulio Alvarez city park where they would disassemble stolen vehicles for stolen parts profiting. One of the Sanchez Tejada brothers resided in the Jose Amado Soler street in the affluent Naco neighborhood.

== Business career ==
In the early 1960s, José Luis Corripio began a process of diversification and expansion of the family business. In 1973, he went into the media business. As of 2021, Grupo Corripio distributes the following mass market consumer brands in the Dominican Republic: Petit, Gatorade, Lipton, Ocean Spray, Tropicana, V8, Salutaris, La Granja, PepsiCo, Pace, Bubbaloo, Campbells, Chips Ahoy, Clorets, Club Social, Clight, Halls, Keebler, Oreo, Prego, Pringles, Quaker, Ritz, Tang, Trident, Victorina, Splenda, Móndelez, Kellogg's, and Procter&Gamble. Grupo Corripio under their Distribuidora Corripio umbrella is the single largest home appliance distributor in the country with over 21 stores across the country distributing Sony, Samsung, Whirlpool, Panasonic, Kitchenaid, GE, Frigidaire, Carrier, Ciac, Char-broil, among others. Grupo Corripio also produce and markets Nedoca. Grupo Corripio is also present in the fashion market exclusively distributing Hackett London, Yanes, Façconable in the Dominican Republic. Grupo Corripio under their company Tecnica SAS also exclusively represent and commercialize Peugeot and Renault motor vehicles in the country. In 2017, Grupo Corripio also acquired an ownership stake in Isla Dominicana de Petróleo which exclusively represents Royal Dutch Shell in the Dominican Republic. In 2021, Isla Dominicana de Petróleo merged with Sol Investments which operated under the brand name Esso, to create the largest fuel distribution network in the country. Grupo Corripio also owns Pinturas Tropical the market leader in paint manufacture and commercialization in the country and well as having an ownership stake in Pinturas Popular.
