= Inter American Press Association =

Press advocacy group

- Abbreviation: IAPA
- Formation: 1943
- Type: press advocacy group
- Headquarters: Miami, United States
- Website: www.sipiapa.com

The Inter American Press Association (IAPA; Spanish: Sociedad Interamericana de Prensa, SIP) is a press advocacy group representing major media organizations in North America, South America and the Caribbean. It is made up of more than 1,300 print publications throughout the Western Hemisphere and is based in Miami, Florida. Every year it issues its IAPA/SIP Excellence in Journalism Awards in the fields of cartoon, online news coverage, news coverage, coverage on mobile phones, features, human rights and community service, photography, infographics, opinion, data journalism, in-depth journalism and press freedom.

IAPA has two autonomous affiliates – the IAPA Press Institute, which offers Latin American members advice on technical publishing matters and politics and the IAPA Scholarship Fund, which provides funds for educational activities.

IAPA is a member of the International Freedom of Expression Exchange, a global network of more than 70 non-governmental organisations that monitors press freedom and freedom of expression violations worldwide.

It has been criticized by many Latin American journalists' trade unions, who claim that it only represents the owners of the large media corporations, that it does not seem to defend journalists themselves, and that it is closely related to right-wing parties.

== History ==
IAPA was conceived at the first Pan American Congress of Journalists in 1926, with a Permanent Commission established in 1942 after the second Congress. IAPA was founded in 1943, and in 1950 became an organisation fully independent of the region's governments. In 1954 it reached a record membership of 373, with the approval of 10 new member organizations.

In 1977 it was reported by Penthouse that IAPA was funded by the CIA.

In 2000 the IAPA inaugurated a new headquarters building, which it named after Jules Dubois, who was Chairman of the Committee on Freedom of the Press and Information for 15 years (1950-1965).

== Chapultepec Index ==
2023 Chapultepec Index Full freedom (81–100 points) Low restriction (61–80 points) Partial restriction (41–60 points) High restriction (21–40 points) No freedom (0–20 points) No data

The Chapultepec Index is an index on press freedom in the Americas that is created for the Inter American Press Society by the Andrés Bello Catholic University in consultation with various academics, attorneys and media experts in the region.

Press freedom scores are organized as follows:

- Full freedom (81–100 points)
- Low restriction (61–80 points)
- Partial restriction (41–60 points)
- High restriction (21–40 points)
- No freedom (0–20 points)

Country	2020	2021	2022	2023
Argentina	77.20	53.27 ▼	55.14 ▲	51.34 ▼
Bolivia	39.80	52.71 ▲	42.72 ▼	33.88 ▼
Brazil	37.20	31.60 ▼	44.26 ▲	48.41 ▲
Canada	71.40	75.81 ▲	80.42 ▲	75.30 ▼
Chile	80.00	82.06 ▲	73.35 ▼	78.85 ▲
Colombia	57.50	57.23 ▼	59.34 ▲	52.30 ▼
Costa Rica	76.75	73.16 ▼	73.83 ▲	61.60 ▼
Cuba	6.20	11.11 ▲	15.68 ▲	14.30 ▼
Dominican Republic	47.00	77.91 ▲	78.30 ▲	81.08 ▲
Ecuador	42.50	55.86 ▲	49.55 ▼	43.85 ▼
El Salvador	42.60	41.74 ▼	40.82 ▼	34.25 ▼
Guatemala	46.00	48.28 ▲	38.40 ▼	32.07 ▼
Honduras	53.00	61.47 ▲	53.07 ▼	36.50 ▼
Jamaica	65.00	78.36 ▲	80.40 ▲	76.78 ▼
Mexico	55.00	49.21 ▼	42.14 ▼	41.82 ▲
Nicaragua	16.00	17.20 ▲	9.50 ▼	8.50 ▼
Panama	55.00	65.97 ▲	66.15 ▲	65.24 ▼
Paraguay	67.40	69.22 ▲	66.25 ▼	51.63 ▼
Peru	67.80	69.85 ▲	55.14 ▼	50.69 ▼
United States	49.60	61.57 ▲	67.26 ▲	60.79 ▼
Uruguay	74.40	84.10 ▲	78.90 ▼	69.81 ▼
Venezuela	3.80	5.71 ▲	10.58 ▲	12.74 ▲
Average:	51.42	55.61 ▲	53.69 ▼	47.84 ▼

== Presidents ==
- Luis Franzini, (Uruguay, 1951–1952)
- John S. Knight, (US, 1952–1953)
- Andrew Heiskell, (US, 1961–1962)
- Jack R. Howard, (US, 1965–1966)
- Lee Hills, (US, 1967–1968)
- Agustín Edwards, (Chile, 1968–1969)
- James S. Copley (US, 1969–1970)
- M. F do Nascimento Brito, (Brazil, 1970–1971)
- Robert U. Brown, (US, 1971–1973)
- Julio de Mesquita Filho, (Brazil, 1974–1975)
- Argentina S. Hills (Puerto Rico, 1977–1978)
- Charles E. Scripps, (US, 1981–1982)
- James B. McClatchy (US, 1991–1992)
- Manuel J. Jiménez (Costa Rica, 1988–1989)
- Danilo Arbilla (Uruguay, 2000–2001)
- Robert J. Cox, (US, 2001–2002)
- Andrés García Gamboa, (Mexico, 2002–2003)
- Jack Fuller, (US, 2003–2004)
- Alejandro Miró Quesada, (Peru, 2004–2005)
- Scott C. Schurz, (US, 2005)
- Diana Daniels, (US, 2005–2006)
- Rafael Molina Morillo, (Dominican Republic, 2006–2007)
- Earl Maucker (US, 2007–2008)
- Andrés García Lavín (Mexico, no dates given)
- Gonzalo Marroquin
- Milton Coleman (US, 2011–present)
