= El Caribe =

Honduran newspaper

- Type: Biweekly newspaper
- Editor-in-chief: Tomás B. McField
- Founded: June 1, 1918
- Language: Spanish language
- Headquarters: Roatán

El Caribe (The Caribbean) was a biweekly newspaper published from Roatán, Honduras. It was edited by Tomás B. McField. Rafael Barahona Mejía was the director of El Caribe.

The newspaper published its first edition in Roatán, Honduras on 1 June 1918.
