= El Nacional (Santo Domingo) =

Dominican newspaper

- Website type: Online newspaper
- Revenue: Subscription, advertisement
- Website: elnacional.com.do
- Launched: July 17, 1997; 29 years ago
- Current status: Online

El Nacional is a Dominican newspaper founded in 1966 by Dr. Rafael Molina Morillo, who was president/owner of Ahora! Publications. The online version of the newspaper was founded on July 17, 1997.

As of 2012, the newspaper director is Radhamés Gómez Pepín.

In February 2017, the newspaper received international attention when it mistakenly published an image of Alec Baldwin portraying Donald Trump, the 45th president of the United States, instead of the president himself. The paper quickly apologized.
