= Listín Diario =

Dominican newspaper

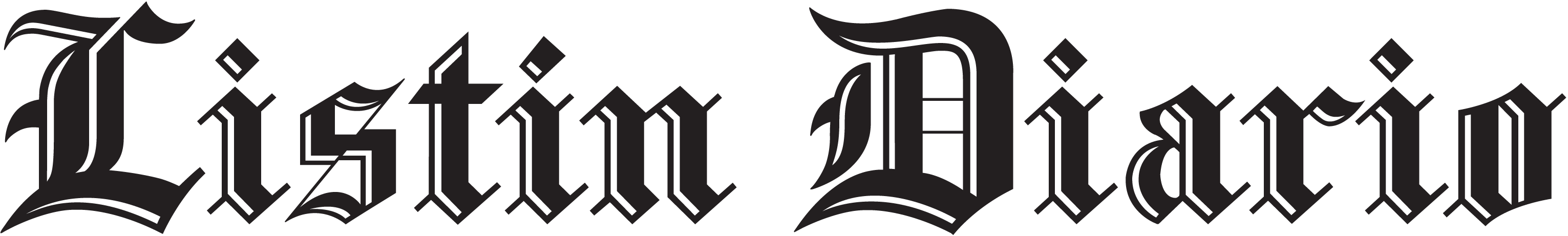
- Type: Daily newspaper
- Format: Broadsheet/Tabloid (from 2019)
- Owners: Manuel Corripio Alonso; Héctor José Rizek Sued; Samir Rizek; Mícalo Bermúdez; Lucía Corripio Alonso
- Editor: Miguel Franjul
- Founded: 1889
- Political alignment: Centre-left to Centre-right
- Headquarters: Santo Domingo, Dominican Republic
- Website: listindiario.com

Listín Diario (Lit. Small Daily List) is one of the leading newspapers in the Dominican Republic, and the oldest still being published.

== History ==
Listín Diario was founded as Listín Diario Marítimo on 1 August 1889 by Arturo Pellerano Alfau and Julian Atiles, two merchants who endeavored to inform the general public of the arrival and departure of merchant ships into Dominican ports. Soon after what began as a single page became a broadsheet newspaper, printed out of the Pellerano & Atiles offices in the Colonial Zone of Santo Domingo. The Venezuelan writer and poet Andrés Mata was its editor for a time.

Pellerano Alfau served as editor and publisher of the newspaper until his death in the early 1930s. During his tenure, Listín Diario championed some of the era's more significant regional issues. It covered the Cuban War of Independence, from 1894 to 1898, during which time it regularly published letters from Dominican General Máximo Gómez, who fought on the Cuban side;. During the American intervention of 1916-24, Listín maintained a serene opposition to the intervention, regularly publishing articles and editorial columns written by the Dominican patriots. Listín's biggest struggle of the first half of the 20th century was against General Rafael Leónidas Trujillo, whom it opposed during the first ten years of his mandate, and as a consequence, was financially strangled by the dictator, having to shut down operations for all of 21 years.

Even before Trujillo was assassinated in May 1961, Pellerano's descendants started to plan the paper's revival. On August 1, 1963, (the 74th anniversary of the paper's founding), it reappeared after more than 20 years without being published. It was led by Carlos Alberto Ricart Vidal (husband of Nelly Pellerano López-Penha, daughter of Arturo Pellerano Alfau) with Moisés Pellerano Lopez-Penha, Rogelio Pellerano Romano, Máximo Pellerano Romano and other close relatives. In the front page's first edition it was published a message inspired by patriotism, civics and morality, focal points of the writings of the founder Arturo Pellerano Alfau. On the same page was a greeting by the Associated Press news agency. The new iteration of Listín Diario was 24 pages with eight columns.

Vidal was publisher from 1963 until 1984, when he retired. His successor, Rogelio Pellerano, served at that post until his death in 1993. Thereafter, Rafael Herrera Cabral, then editor of El Caribe (another leading daily newspaper at the time) became the editor of Listín Diario. He served from 1993 until his death in 1994. He has been considered one of the most important editorialists of the Dominican Republic.

Listín Diario's current editor-in-chief is Miguel Franjul of the Franjul family. In 2003, the Dominican government seized control of the newspaper as well as other media assets, "70 radio stations and four television stations" when Ramon Baez Figueroa, the media group's "main shareholder was charged in a £1.4bn fraud that bankrupted the Caribbean country’s second largest bank Banco Intercontinental." Franjul was fired, replaced with Juan Estevez (a former Agriculture Ministry spokesman) as interim manager. Later reinstated, Franjul resigned in January 2008, and Antonio Gil led management, but Gil was fired in December of that year, and a day later, Franjul resumed leadership yet again.

The compendium Cien años del Listín indicates that Manuel Amiama provided significant guidance. His editorial “Aquí está el Listín”, in which Aimiama reaffirmed the impartiality that of the newspaper, is considered one of the most important editorials in Dominican history.

== Newspapers greetings ==
In the 128th Listín Diario's anniversary, different newspapers greeted it for the long and brave journey.

El Día said that this mission had been long, fructiferous and full of challenges. Reaching 128 years of work meant redoubling efforts, overcoming communicative and conventional difficulties until handling the modern tools of this century.

It also mentioned that Listín Diario has a unique history in Dominican's journalism and of all the papers it is the oldest, thanks to many factors, among them because it has been able to make important decisions through the years.

Hoy describes that Listín Diario had run evenly, and sometimes ahead, with the challenges of the times. The thrust of digital media is an unavoidable challenge for print journals, and has not wavered before this reality, which assumes permanent innovations, good information and reading material, and through timely research on the topics more interesting for social plurality.

== Recent change to Tabloid Style Format ==
On March 11, 2019, Listín Diario released a brand new tabloid format. The editor-in-chief, Miguel Franjul, explained that the new format is more comfortable, manageable and attractive for readers. Specifying the modernization of its design, Franjul indicated this was a common trend occurring with other respected newspapers. He mentioned that this transformation has been accompanied by heavy investments in technologies that make it possible to combine the printed editions with the digital ones, increasing the audiences extraordinarily, therefore achieving higher revenues off the monetization plans, through both platforms, in response to the progressive decline in the advertising of the printed platform.
