= Schärer =

Schärer or Schaerer is a Swiss surname. Notable people with the surname include:

- Céline Schärer (born 1990), Swiss triathlete
- Erich Schärer (born 1946), Swiss bobsledder
- Peter Schärer, Swiss bobsledder
- Willy Schärer, (1903–1982), Swiss middle-distance runner
- Ludwig Schaerer (1785–1853), Swiss pastor and lichenologist
- Eduardo Schaerer (1873–1941), Swiss-Paraguayan politic leader and President of Paraguay between 1912 and 1916
- Santiago Schaerer (1834–1895), Swiss colonizer and settler
- Arturo Schaerer (1907–1979), Paraguayan journalist and entrepreneur
