= Maria Moors Cabot Prizes =

International journalism awards

The Maria Moors Cabot Prizes are the oldest international awards in the field of journalism. They are presented each fall by the Trustees of Columbia University to journalists in the Western hemisphere who are viewed as having made a significant contributions to upholding freedom of the press in the Americas and Inter-American understanding. Since 2003, the prize can be awarded to an organization instead of an individual.

== History ==
The American Boston industrialist and philanthropist, Godfrey Lowell Cabot, who founded the Cabot Corporation and was also a major benefactor of both MIT and Harvard, where the general science library is named in his honor, established the Maria Moors Cabot Prizes in 1938, in memory of his wife. The prizes have been awarded annually since 1939, by the Trustees of Columbia University in the City of New York, on recommendation of the dean of the Graduate School of Journalism and the Cabot Prize Board, which is composed of journalists and educators.

== Board ==
The awards board consists of the following persons:

Tracy Wilkinson, from the Los Angeles Times where she covered the Iraq War, among others.

Carlos Dada, Salvadoran journalist, founder and director of El Faro. He won the Maria Moors Cabot Prize in 2011.

John Dinges, The Godfrey Lowell Cabot Professor of Journalism at Columbia University is an author and journalist specializing in Latin America. He received a Maria Moors Cabot Prizes medal in 1992.

Juan Enriquez Cabot, Authority on economic and political impacts of life sciences. Best-selling author; speaker; investor/co-founder in multiple start up companies; board member for both private and public companies/non-profits. Former founding Director of Life Sciences Project at Harvard Business School.

June Carolyn Erlick, editor-in-chief of ReVista, the Harvard Review of Latin America.

Gustavo Gorritti, Peruvian journalist, the founder of lDL Reporteros. He is a recipient of a Nieman Fellowship at Harvard University and a winner of the Maria Moors Cabot Prize in 1992 and the FNPI Gabriel García Marquez award. Expert in Peruvian internal war and anti corruption investigation.

Carlos Lauría, Americas Program Coordinator at the Committee to Protect Journalists.

Julia Preston, national correspondent for The New York Times. Preston received a Maria Moors Cabot Prize in 1997.

María Teresa Ronderos, serves as Director of VerdadAbierta.com. Ronderos is an editorial advisor to Semana. She received the King of Spain Ibero-American Award in 1997 and received a Maria Moors Cabot Prize in 2007.

Paulo Sotero, director of the Brazil Institute of the Woodrow Wilson Center in Washington, D.C.

== Recipients ==
Three to four medalists from the United States, Latin America, and Canada are selected each year. Prize winners receive the Cabot medal and a $5,000 honorarium, plus travel expenses to New York City and hotel accommodations for the presentation ceremony.

As of 2014, 273 Cabot gold medals and 56 special citations have been awarded to journalists from more than 30 countries in the Americas.

Year	Honorees	Country
2021	Eliane Brum	Brazil
2021	Adela Navarro Bello	Mexico
2021	Mary Beth Sheridan	United States
2021	Adriana Zehbrauskas	United States/Brazil
2021	Regina Martínez Pérez and The Cartel Project	Honduras
2021	Contracorriente	Honduras
2020	Ricardo Calderón Villegas	Colombia
2020	Patrícia Campos Mello	Brazil
2020	Stephen Ferry	United States
2020	Carrie Kahn	United States
2019	Angela Kocherga	United States
2019	Pedro Xavier Molina	Nicaragua
2019	Boris Muñoz	United States
2019	Marcela Turati	Mexico
2018	Hugo Alconada Mon	Argentina
2018	Jacqueline Charles	United States
2018	Graciela Mochkofsky	United States
2018	Fernando Rodrigues	Brazil
2018	Meridith Kohut	United States
2017	Martín Caparrós	Argentina
2017	Dorrit Harazim	Brazil
2017	Nick Miroff	United States
2017	Mimi Whitefield	United States
2016	Rodrigo Abd	Peru
2016	Rosental Alves	United States
2016	Margarita Martínez	Colombia
2016	Óscar Martínez	El Salvador
2016	Marina Walker Guevara and the Panama Papers Reporting Team	United States
2015	Lucas Mendes	Brazil
2015	Raúl Peñaranda	Bolivia
2015	Simon Romero	United States
2015	Mark Stevenson	United States
2015	Ernesto Londoño	United States
2014	Frank Bajak	United States
2014	Paco Calderón	Mexico
2014	Giannina Segnini	Costa Rica
2014	Tracy Wilkinson	United States
2014	Tamoa Calzadilla	Venezuela
2014	Laura Weffer	Venezuela
2013	Jon Lee Anderson	United States
2013	Donna de Cesare	United States
2013	Mauri König	Brazil
2013	Alejandro Santos Rubino	United States
2012	Teodoro Petkoff	Venezuela
2012	Miguel Ángel Bastenier	Colombia
2012	Juan Forero	United States
2012	David Luhnow	United States
2012	El Universo	Ecuador
2011	Arizona Daily Star	United States
2011	El Diario de Juárez	Mexico
2011	Ríodoce	Mexico
2011	Carlos Dada	El Salvador
2011	Jean-Michel Leprince	Canada
2010	Tyler Bridges	United States
2010	Carlos Fernando Chamorro	Nicaragua
2010	Norman Gall	United States
2010	Joaquim Ibarz	Spain
2010	Signal FM radio station	Haiti
2010	CNN and Anderson Cooper 360°	United States
2009	Anthony DePalma	United States
2009	Christopher Hawley	United States
2009	Merval Pereira	Brazil
2009	Yoani Sánchez	Cuba
2008	Carmen Aristegui Flores	Mexico
2008	Sam Quiñones	United States
2008	Gustavo Sierra	Argentina
2008	Michael Smith	United States
2007	Alfredo Corchado	Mexico
2007	José Vales	Mexico
2007	María Teresa Ronderos	Colombia
2007	Gary T. Marx	United States
2006	Mario Vargas Llosa	Peru
2006	Ginger Thompson	United States
2006	José Hamilton Ribeiro	Brazil
2006	Matt Moffet	United States
2005	Miriam Leitão	Brazil
2005	Tim Padgett	United States
2005	Mabel Rehnfeldt	Paraguay
2005	S. Lynne Walker	United States
2005	La Nación	Costa Rica
2004	Gerardo Reyes (journalist)	United States
2004	Daniel Santoro	Argentina
2004	Elena Poniatowska	Mexico
2004	Joel Millman	United States
2004	Alberto Ibargüen	United States
2003	João Antônio Barros	Brazil
2003	Raúl Kraiselburd	Argentina
2003	Mac Margolis	United States
2003	Michael Reid	United Kingdom
2003	Sociedad de Periodistas Manuel Márquez Sterling	Cuba
2002	David C. Adams	United States
2002	Sergio Luis Carreras	Argentina
2002	Michèle Montas	Haiti
2002	Robert J. Rivard	United States
2001	Monica Gonzalez	Chile
2001	Jorge Ramos	United States
2001	Clóvis Rossi	Brazil
2001	Sebastian R. Rotella	United States
2000	Eloy O. Aguilar	Mexico
2000	Paul Knox	Canada
2000	Francisco Santos	Colombia
2000	Ricardo Uceda	Peru
2000	Lloyd Williams	Jamaica
1999	James McClatchy	United States
1999	Raúl Rivero	Cuba
1999	Linda Robinson	United States
1999	Juan Tamayo	United States
1999	Jorge Zepeda Patterson	Mexico
1998	Jesús Blancornelas	Mexico
1998	Edmundo Cruz Vílchez	Peru
1998	Andrés Oppenheimer	United States
1998	William Lawrence Rohter, Jr.	United States
1997	Gerardo Bedoya	Colombia
1997	José de Córdoba	United States
1997	Jorge Fontevecchia	Argentina
1997	Julia Preston	United States
1997	Enrique Santos Castillo	Colombia
1997	Hernando Santos Castillo	Colombia
1996	Dudley Althaus	United States
1996	Ramón Garza García	Mexico
1996	Timothy Jay Johnson	United States
1996	Eduardo Ulibarri	Costa Rica
1995	Roberto Eisenmann	Panama
1995	Douglas Farah	United States
1995	Canute James	Jamaica
1995	Geri Smith	United States
1995	José Zamora Marroquín	Guatemala
1994	James Brooke	United States
1994	Mauricio Funes	El Salvador
1994	Susan Meiselas	United States
1994	Oscar Serrat	Argentina
1993	Pamela Constable	United States
1993	Manuel de Dios	United States
1993	Edward Seaton	United States
1993	Patricia Verdugo	Chile
1992	Danilo Arbilla	Uruguay
1992	Sam Dillon	United States
1992	John Dinges	United States
1992	Gustavo Gorriti	Peru
1991	Ricardo Arnt	Brazil
1991	Gilberto Dimenstein	Brazil
1991	Otavio Frias Filho	Brazil
1991	Eduardo Gallardo	Chile
1991	Alejandro Junco de la Vega	Mexico
1990	Richard Boudreaux	United States
1990	Huascar Cajias Kauffman	Bolivia
1990	Elsie Etheart	Haiti
1990	Alma Guillermoprieto	Mexico
1990	Carlos Lins da Silva	Brazil
1990	Lucia Newman	United States
1989	Felipe López Caballero	Colombia
1989	Humberto Rubín Schvartzman	Paraguay
1989	Juan M. Vazquez	United States
1989	Arturo Villar	United States
1988	Nicholas Clark Asheshov	Peru
1988	Roberto Civita	Brazil
1988	Stephen Kinzer	United States
1988	Hermenegildo Sábat	Argentina
1987	Luis Camacho (posthumous)	Colombia
1987	Guillermo Cano Isaza (posthumous)	Colombia
1987	Raúl Echavarría Barrientos	Colombia
1987	Guy Gugliotta	United States
1987	Luis Levy	Brazil
1987	Roberto Muller	Brazil
1987	Paulo Sotero	Brazil
1986	Dario Arizmendi	Colombia
1986	Alfonso Chardy	United States
1986	Hugh O'Shaughnessy	United Kingdom
1986	Julio Rajneri	Argentina
1986	Guillermo Sánchez Borbón	Panama
1986	Gavin Scott	United States
1985	Shirley Christian	United States
1985	Dery Dyer	Costa Rica
1985	Richard Dyer	Costa Rica
1985	William H. Heath	United States
1985	Rafael Herrera	Dominican Republic
1985	Andrew Morrison	Guyana
1985	Aldo Zuccolillo	Paraguay
1984	William Buzenberg	United States
1984	Kenneth Gordon	Trinidad and Tobago
1984	John Hoagland (posthumous)	United States
1984	Harold Hoyte	Barbados
1984	Alister Hughes	Grenada
1984	Cynthia Hughes	Grenada
1984	Frank Manitzas	United States
1983	Jack Fendell	United States
1983	Emilio Filippi	Chile
1983	Everett Martin	United States
1983	Marcel Neidergang	France
1982	Frances Grant	United States
1982	William R. Long	United States
1982	Daniel Samper	Colombia
1981	Karen DeYoung	United States
1981	Marlise Simons	Netherlands
1981	Stanley Swinton	United States
1981	Jacobo Timerman	Argentina
1980	Richard T. Baker	United States
1980	Guido Fernández	Costa Rica
1980	Penny Lernoux	United States
1980	Alan Riding	United States
1980	Bill Stewart (posthumous)	United States
1979	Leslie Ashenheim	Jamaica
1979	Jerry Hannifin	United States
1979	Andrew Heiskell	United States
1979	Jeremiah O'Leary	United States
1979	Juan Zuleta Ferrer	Colombia
1978	Joseph Benham	United States
1978	Carlos Castelo Branco	Brazil
1978	Robert Cox	Argentina
1978	Carl Migdail	United States
1977	Pedro Joaquín Chamorro Cardenal	Nicaragua
1977	Jonathan Kandell	United States
1977	Joseph A. Taylor	United States
1977	Anita von Kahler Gumpert	United States
1976	Robert U. Brown	United States
1976	Bernard Diederich	United States
1976	Germán Ornes	Dominican Republic
1976	Jorge Remonda-Ruibal	Argentina
1975	Walter Everett (journalist)	United States
1975	Norman Ingrey	Argentina
1975	David Kraiselburd (posthumous)	Argentina
1975	Sam Summerlin	United States
1975	Enrique Zileri Gibson	Peru
1974	Donald Bohning	United States
1974	William Montalbano	United States
1974	Fernando Pedreira	Brazil
1973	David F. Belnap	United States
1973	Donald Casey	United States
1973	Diana Julio de Massot	Argentina
1972	Pedro Beltrán	Peru
1972	Tom Steithorst	United States
1972	Arturo Uslar Pietri	Venezuela
1971	Juan Carlos Colombres (Landrú)	Argentina
1971	Georgie Anne Geyer	United States
1971	Julio Scherer García	Mexico
1970	Alberto Dines	Brazil
1970	John Goshko	United States
1970	John Harbron	Canada
1969	Alceu Amoroso Lima	Brazil
1969	Edward W. Barrett	United States
1969	George Beebe	United States
1969	Luis Gabriel Cano	Colombia
1968	Robert Bellerez	United States
1968	Alberto Gainza Paz	Argentina
1968	Guillermo Gutiérrez	United States
1968	Argentina Hills	Puerto Rico
1968	José Joaquin Salcedo	Colombia
1967	Peter Aldor	Colombia
1967	James S. Copley	United States
1967	James Goodsell	United States
1967	M.F. Nascimento Brito	Brazil
1967	Ramón J. Velásquez	Venezuela
1966	Alberto Cellario	United States
1966	Agustín Edwards Eastman	Chile
1966	Paul Kidd (journalist)	Canada
1965	Gesford Fine	United States
1965	Roberto Marinho	Brazil
1965	Victoria Ocampo	Argentina
1965	Paul Sanders	United States
1964	Hugo Fernández Artucio	Uruguay
1964	Bertram Johansson	United States
1964	Enrique Nores	Argentina
1964	Virginia Prewett	United States
1963	Germán Arciniegas	Colombia
1963	William Barlow	United States
1963	Jorge Fernández	Ecuador
1963	Juan de Onis	United States
1963	Juan Valmaggia	Argentina
1962	Raúl Fontaina	Uruguay
1962	John R. Herbert	United States
1962	Rodolfo Junco de la Vega	Mexico
1962	John Shively Knight	United States
1961	Alejandro Carrión	Ecuador
1961	Fernando Gómez Martínez	Colombia
1961	Albert Nevins	United States
1961	Rómulo O'Farrill	Mexico
1961	John T. O'Rourke	United States
1960	James Canel	United States
1960	José Dutriz, Jr.	El Salvador
1960	Rodolfo Luque	Argentina
1960	William M. Pepper, Jr.	United States
1960	Eduardo Santos	Colombia
1959	Ricardo Castro Beeche	Costa Rica
1959	Clement Hellyer	United States
1959	Juan A. Ramírez	Uruguay
1959	Tad Szulc	United States
1959	Hernane Tavares de Sá	Brazil
1958	Emilio Azcárraga Vidaurreta	Mexico
1958	Eduardo Cardenas	United States
1958	Jesús Hernández Chapellín	Venezuela
1958	Miguel Angel Quevedo	Cuba
1957	Paulo Bittencourt	Brazil
1957	Luis Franzini	Uruguay
1957	Harry W. Frantz	United States
1957	John Shively Knight	United States
1957	Miguel Lanz Duret	Mexico
1957	Carlos Mantilla	Ecuador
1957	Roberto Marinho	Brazil
1957	Guillermo Martínez Márquez	Cuba
1957	Herbert Moses	Brazil
1957	John T. O'Rourke	United States
1957	René Silva Espejo	Chile
1957	James Geddes Stahlman	United States
1957	Tom Wallace	United States
1956	Carl W. Ackerman	United States
1956	Jesús Alvarez del Castillo	Mexico
1956	Roberto García Peña	Colombia
1956	Herbert Matthews	United States
1956	David Torino	Argentina
1955	Pedro Beltrán	Peru
1955	Breno Caldas	Brazil
1955	John Oliver LaGorce	United States
1955	Roberto Noble	Argentina
1955	A. T. Steele	United States
1954	Gabriel Cano	Colombia
1954	Sidney Fletcher	Jamaica
1954	Danton Jobim	Brazil
1954	Carlos Ramirez MacGregor	Venezuela
1954	Lloyd Statton	United States
1953	Crede Clahoun	United States
1953	Carlos Lacerda	Brazil
1953	Ismael Pérez Castro	Ecuador
1953	Arturo Schaerer	Paraguay
1952	Antonio Arias Bernal	Mexico
1952	Austregésilo de Athayde	Brazil
1952	Jorge Délano Frederick (Coke)	Chile
1952	Jules Dubois	United States
1952	Juan B. Fernández	Colombia
1951	Elmano Cardim	Brazil
1951	Julio Garzón	United States
1951	Ramón León	Venezuela
1951	Francisco María Núñez	Costa Rica
1950	John Brogan	United States
1950	María Constanza Huergo	Argentina
1950	Jesús María Pellín	Venezuela
1950	Joshua Powers	United States
1950	Ángel Ramos	Puerto Rico
1949	Milton Bracker	United States
1949	Eduardo Rodriguez Larreta	Uruguay
1949	José Santiago Castillo	Ecuador
1948	Manuel Cineros Sánchez	Peru
1948	Joseph L. Jones	United States
1948	Orlando Ribeiro Dantas	Brazil
1948	Alfredo Silva Carvallo	Chile
1947	Carlos Aramayo	Bolivia
1947	Alberto Lleras Camargo	Colombia
1947	David Vela	Guatemala
1946	Grant Dexter	Canada
1946	Lee Hills	United States
1946	Miguel Lanz Duret	Mexico
1945	Assis Chateaubriand	Brazil
1945	Luis Teófilo Nuñez	Venezuela
1945	Tom Wallace	United States
1944	Carlos Mantilla Ortega	Ecuador
1944	Albert McGeachy	Panama
1944	Jorge Pinto	El Salvador
1943	Pedro Cue	Cuba
1943	Rodrigo de Llano	Mexico
1943	Edward Tomlinson	United States
1942	Lorenzo Batlle Pacheco	Uruguay
1942	Luis Mitre	Argentina
1941	Paulo Bittencourt	Brazil
1941	Sylvia de Arruda Botelho Bittencourt	Brazil
1941	Carlos Dávila	Chile
1941	José Ignacio Rivero	Cuba
1940	Agustín Edwards Mac Clure	Chile
1940	James Irving Miller	United States
1940	Enrique Santos Montejo	Colombia
1940	Rafael Heliodoro Valle	Honduras
1939	Luis Miró Quesada de la Guerra	Peru
1939	José Santos Gollan	Argentina

== Ceremony ==
The winners of the award are announced between May and July, and the prizes are presented by the President of Columbia University each fall, at a ceremony in the rotunda of Low Memorial Library.

== Yoani Sánchez case ==
In 2009, 34-year-old Cuban writer Yoani Sánchez became the first blogger to win the Maria Moors Cabot Prize. The award was given for her blog, Generación Y, which contained much criticism of the Cuban regime. Sánchez was denied an exit visa to travel to New York to receive her prize.
