= List of Grenadian writers =

This list of Grenadian writers includes those born in or associated with the island of Grenada.

== A ==
- Joan Anim-Addo
- Peggy Antrobus (born 1935)

== B ==
- Allister Bain (born 1935)
- Tobias S. Buckell (born 1979)
- Jean Buffong (born 1943)

== C ==
- Bernard Coard (born 1945)
- Merle Collins (born 1950)

== H ==
- Alister Hughes (1919–2005)
- Cynthia Hughes (died 1989)

== J ==
- Gus John (born 1945)

== R ==
- Don Rojas (born 1949)
- Jacob Ross (born 1956)

== S ==
- Monica Skeete (1923–1997)

== W ==
- Verna Wilkins (born 1943)
