= José Antonio Alonso Navarro =

Spanish philologist

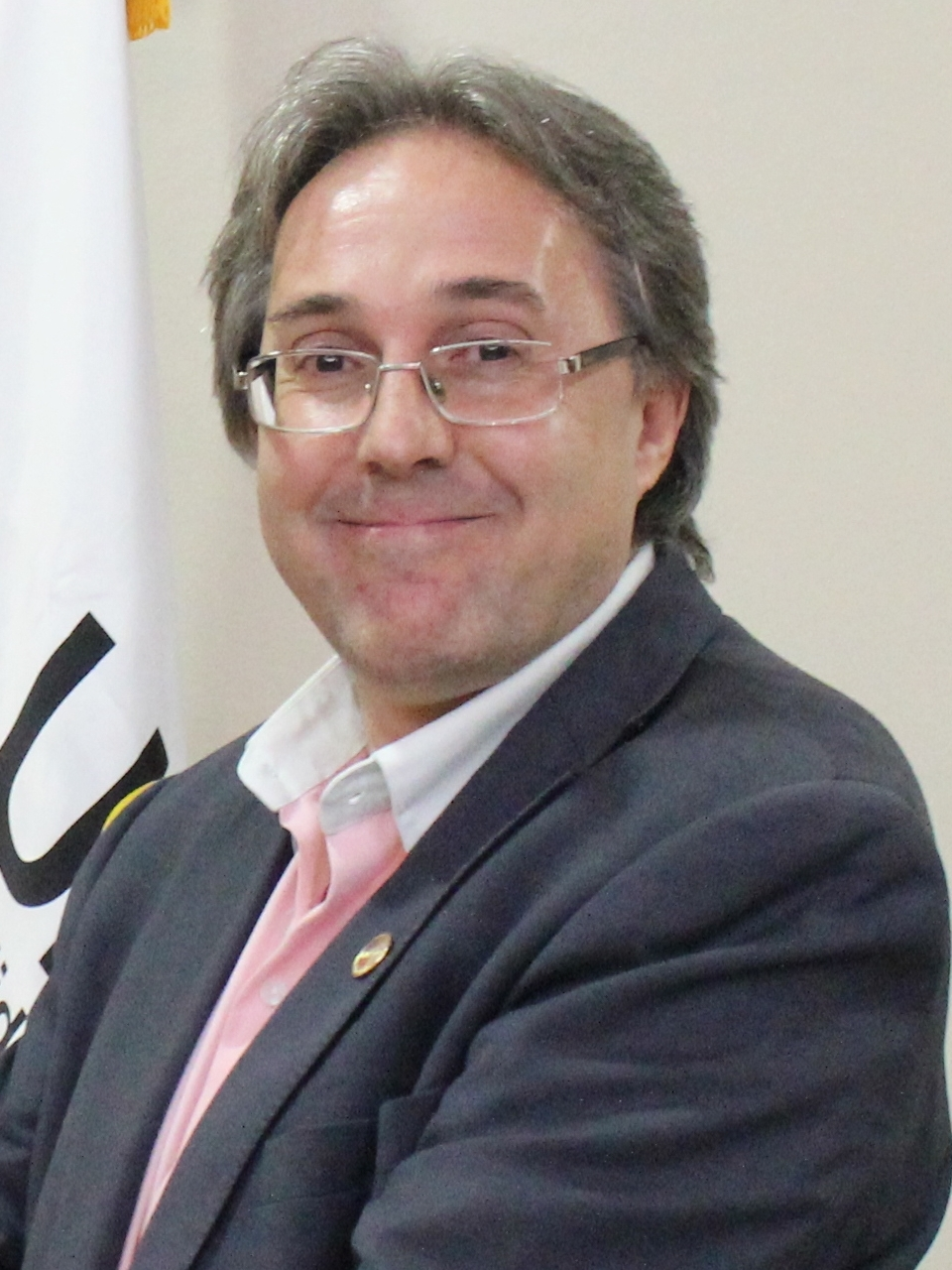
- Alonso Navarro in 2017
- Born: 29 October 1965 (age 60); Madrid, Spain
- Education: Complutense University of Madrid
- Occupations: Writer, professor of English and English literature, and European literature in general
- Writing career
- Language: Medieval English
- Years active: 1984–2016
- Genre: Medievalist
- Notable works: Prose translation of the Flower and Leaf; Medieval poems dedicated to the celebration and praise of our Mother Virgin Mary
- Notable awards: Cum Laude PhD
- Movement: Literary

José Antonio Alonso Navarro (born 29 October 1965) is a Spanish philologist, university professor of English and English literature, and European literature in general.

In addition, he is a medievalist, a translator, a literary critic in La Tribuna and a writer.

== Life and career ==
He was born in Madrid, Spain, in 1965. Navarro holds a BA in English Philology from the Complutense University of Madrid and a PhD in English Philology from the Coruña University (Spain). He wrote a doctoral dissertation about the afterlife in medieval Europe, and included a complete comparative analysis of two medieval texts on the afterlife within the same genre. He was awarded the "CUM LAUDE" accolade.

On 21 March 2017 Nick White, Deputy Head of Mission and Chargé d'Affaires at the British Embassy of Asunción, Paraguay, awarded Navarro a Certificate of Honor on behalf of the British Ambassador in Asunción, Jeremy Hobbs due to his outstanding contribution to the translation and spread of Medieval English literature in both Spain and Paraguay for almost 20 years.

The French Hispanist professor Marie Christine Seguin from the Catholic Institute of Toulouse published a study on the poetry of José Antonio Alonso Navarro dedicated to Friar Leopold of Alpandeire in Inter-Lignes: Autumn Number 2021 (27) titled in French Crises, Mutations, Recompositions. The number 2021 (27) was released in 2023.

On 23 April 2025, the Minister of the Linguistic Policy Secretariat, Javier Viveros, awarded Alonso Navarro an important recognition plaque for his contribution to the promotion of Spanish Language in Paraguay.

On December 3rd, 2025 (Wednesday), doctor José Antonio Alonso Navarro was appointed Fellow Member of the Paraguayan Academy of the Spanish Language.

On June 25, 2026, Dr. Alonso Navarro was appointed a Full Member of the Paraguayan Academy of the Spanish Language and, by extension, of the Royal Spanish Academy.

== Selected works ==
=== Writer ===
- Paraguayan Pearls. Álamo. 1999.
- Soly Luna. Arandurá. 2000.
- Llanto de Niño Gris. Arandurá. 2001.
- Che ñahati-i paraguaya. Arandurá. 2003.
- Arroyos y Esteros. Etigraf. 2003.
- Réquiem por Atocha. Nueva Dramaturgia Malagueña. 2.005.
- Málaga en Picasso. Universidad Autónoma de Asunción (Imprenta Salesiana). 2006.
- Como agua cristalina. Universidad Autónoma de Asunción (Marben Editora). 2018.
- Yerutíes de terciopelo negro y rojo. Arandurá. 2002.
- Bálsamo de Alpandeire. Universidad Autónoma de Asunción (Marben Editora). 2019.
- Juan Manuel Marcos:Un periplo por su voz poética. Asunción UniNorte. 2019.
- Poem To my Father. El Parlante digital. 2020.
- Sigo siendo en ti. BenMar. Asunción, Paraguay. 2021.
- Olivo de mi Ser. Rosalba. Asunción, Paraguay. 2022.
- Alonso Navarro, José Antonio (2017). "Poem To my Father". De Sur a Sur (Journal of Poetry and Literary Arts) (16): 25–27. ISSN 2660-7239.
- Romance of my Sailboat. Poem of Nothingness. De Sur a Sur Ediciones. 2023.
- Extraterrestrial Contact in the City of Lyon, 2023.
- The peasant of Kent, 2023.
- The Buro, 2024.
- Formalist analysis of the poem Make a place at your side.Criterio Ediciones. 2024.
- A Jasmine Bouquet.Amazon Kindle. 2024.
- Poems of guaranias, polkas, and sensualities.BenMar. 2026.

=== Translations of Middle English medieval texts ===
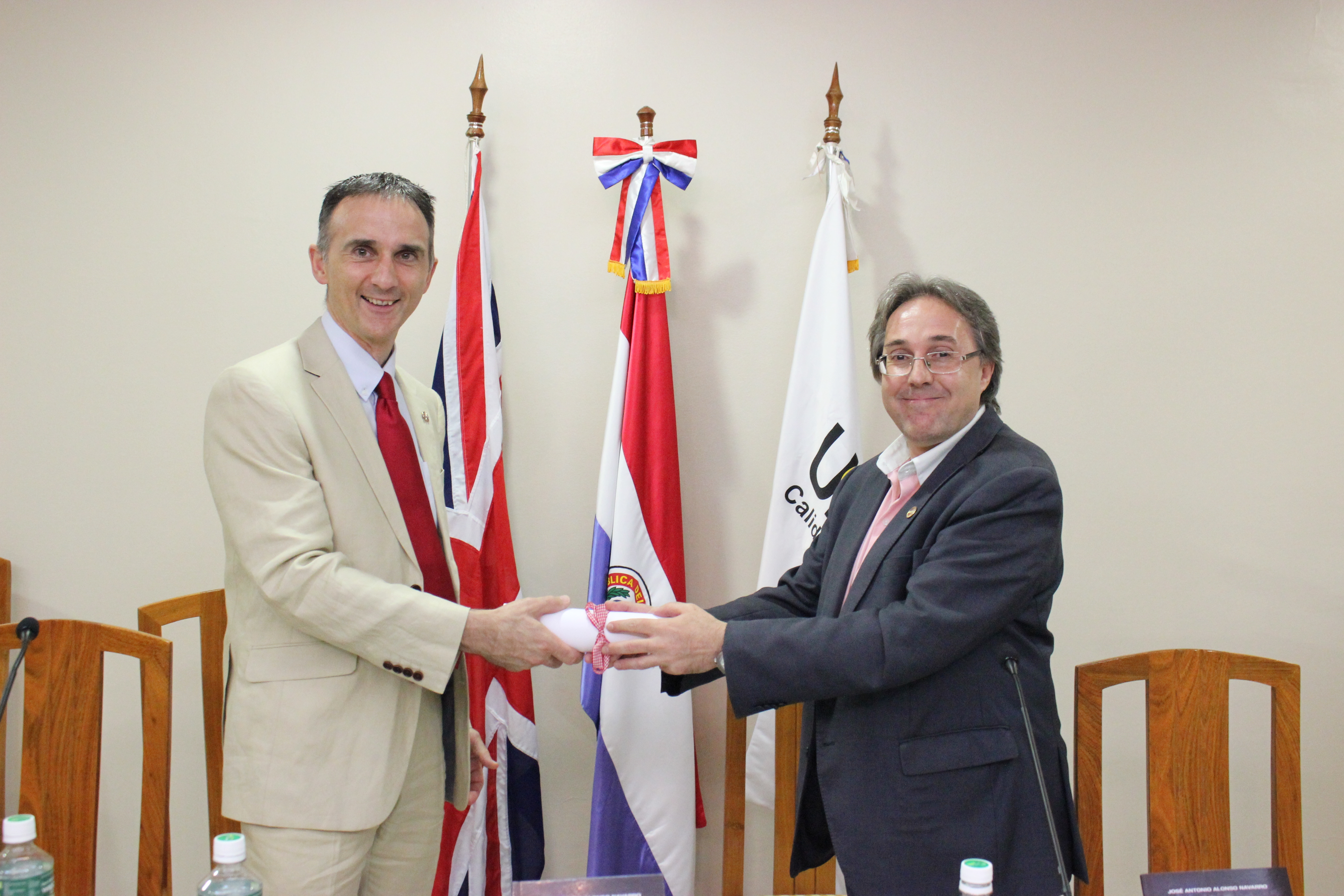
Nick White, Chargé d'affaires of the British Embassy of Asuncion, presents a Certificate of Honour to José Antonio Alonso Navarro, on behalf of the British Ambassor of Her Majesty Queen Elizabeth II, Jeremy Hobbs, for his contribution to both the translation and dissemination of Medieval English texts.

- Sir Gowther
- Piers Ploughman's creed
- Piers Ploughman's creed (verses 1-883)
- The Vision of Tundal
- The gast of Gy
- The flower and the leaf
- Marian lyrics
- Sir Owain
- Sir Cleges
- Sir Degaré
- Sir Isumbras
- Translation into Spanish of "Sir Corneus"
- Translation into Spanish of "The Isle of Ladies"
- Sir Eglamour of Artois
- The Tale of the Basin
- The Lady Prioress
- Sir Launfal
- Friar Daw's Reply
- Jack Upland
- Sir Orfeo
- Jack and his Stepdame
- Translation of Medieval English texts into Spanish which offer a negative image of marriage (Journal - Ñemityra 2021)
- Translation of Old English riddles into Spanish (The Riddle Ages).
- Critical edition and translation of "La danza de la muerte", by John Lydgate” and “Los frailes de Berwick”. Eduvim Publishing House-National University of Villa Maria. Cordoba, Argentina, 2023.
- English Stories Written in the Middle Ages (Ediciones de la Paz 2024)
