= Goshko =

Goshko is a surname. Notable people with the surname include:

- John M. Goshko (1933–2014), American journalist
- Susannah Goshko, British civil servant
