= Gugliotta =

Gugliotta is an Italian surname. Notable people with the surname include:

- Guy Gugliotta, American journalist
- Olga Noemí Gugliotta (1920–1999), Argentine poet
- Sandra Gugliotta (born 1969), Argentine filmmaker
- Tom Gugliotta (born 1969), American former basketball player
