= Sam Dillon =

American journalist and author

Sam Dillon is an American journalist, lawyer and author. He worked as a correspondent at The New York Times between 1992 and 2011 and has authored two non-fiction books.

== Journalism career ==
Dillon attended the University of Chicago before graduating with a B.A. in history from the University of Minnesota in 1980. A year later he graduated from Columbia University’s Graduate School of Journalism.

He worked as a reporter for the Minnesota Daily, the St. Paul Pioneer Press, the Associated Press, and the Miami Herald. In 1987, he shared a Pulitzer Prize with colleagues at the Miami Herald for reporting on the Iran-contra scandal. In 1992, at the end of his tenure as a Miami Herald correspondent, he received a Maria Moors Cabot Prize for his coverage of Latin America.

Dillon was a foreign and national correspondent for The New York Times for 19 years, from 1992 through 2011. Dillon was the Mexico City Bureau Chief when a team of Times journalists won the 1998 Pulitzer Prize in the International Reporting category for coverage of "the corrosive effects of drug corruption in Mexico".

Upon leaving the Times he practiced immigration law after graduating from Rutgers Law School in 2015.

== Writing ==
Dillon's first book, Comandos: The CIA and Nicaragua’s Contra Rebels, published by Henry Holt & Company, 1991, is a narrative history of the Reagan administration's 1980s counterinsurgency in Nicaragua, which he covered as a correspondent based in Managua. Dillon researched and wrote the book as a 1989 fellow at the Alicia Patterson Foundation. Writing in the New York Review of Books, Michael Massing called Comandos an "explosive new book…..that is both an engaging personal story and one of the most damning indictments ever written of the Central Intelligence Agency." The book was also reviewed in the Los Angeles Times and Commentary.

His second book, Opening Mexico: The Making of a Democracy, published by Farrar, Straus & Giroux in 2004, is a narrative account of the emergence of a citizens' democracy movement in Mexico. Dillon co-authored the book with fellow New York Times correspondent Julia Preston.
