= Carlos Ruiz Apezteguia =

Paraguayan journalist and entrepreneur (1930–1995)

Carlos Ruiz Apezteguía (July 7, 1930 – May 15, 1995), was a Paraguayan journalist and entrepreneur.

== Life ==
Born in the city of Concepción, Paraguay, his parents were Mr. Pedro Ruiz Gomez, Spanish son and director of the Spanish company Segura Latorre in Paraguay, and Mrs. Julia Apezteguía Casañas, daughter of Basque Spaniards. He was married to Myriam Schaerer Ayala, eldest daughter of Arturo Schaerer and granddaughter of Eduardo Schaerer, President of Paraguay between 1912 and 1916.

== Journalism and legacy ==
His studies were conducted at the German School in Asunción and San Jose High School. He later studied at the University of the Republic in Montevideo, Uruguay, and then law at the National University of Asuncion. From a young age he joined the Liberal Party and became one of its leading exponents. Between 1952 and 1954 he was President of the Liberal Alon Party, the youth wing of the Liberal Party, as well as the University Federation of the Liberal Party, and along with Justo Prieto, Evelio Fernández Arévalos and other exponents of liberalism faced the dark years after the Paraguayan Civil War.

He was manager of the newspaper La Tribuna since 1954, and from there also he fought, with its director Arturo Schaerer, denouncing abuses and crimes of the dictatorship and the breakdown of rule of law that began with Higinio Morínigo and continued with Alfredo Stroessner. He was persecuted, imprisoned and tortured many times, but never gave up his ideals of freedom. In November 1956 the government intervened brutally in La Tribuna, with Ruiz A. arrested, tortured and then abandoned in a boat on the shores of Clorinda, Argentina. He then went into exile in Montevideo, Uruguay, accompanied by his wife and their daughter Maria Angelica.

In 1959, through the mediation of his wife's grandfather, Araminto Ayala, Consul of Uruguay in Paraguay, he returned to Paraguay and resumed his journalistic work in La Tribuna. Later he founded with Arturo Schaerer the printing industry EMASA (Maria Angelica Company SA), which became the main printing industry of the country during the 60s. La Tribuna also grew to be one of the country's most respected newspapers, with a bold anti-Stroessner tone, agencies in many countries; accordingly, its circulation grew from 2,000 copies daily in the 1920s to more than 70,000 by the year 1965, being that value until today greater than the current daily circulation of Paraguay.

On May 15, 1972, Arturo Schaerer was succeeded by Carlos Ruiz Apezteguia in the direction of the newspaper. During his direction, he denounced abuses in the negotiations of the Treaty of Itaipu and Yacyreta, with Brazil and Argentina respectively on the construction of the hydroelectric dams. Achieving under the pressure exerted by him, no modification of the voltage and frequency of the Paraguayan electric system, what had been intended for the benefit of the Brazilian system and intended to use almost all of Paraguay's energy. He always protested for the dark and unfavorable conditions accepted in these treaties. He continued frontal and acid criticism to the dictatorial government, embodied in a memorable manifesto he wrote called "Put the Moral into fashion". It was reported Stroessner used to say of him: "Carlos Ruiz Apezteguía kicks ahead and not back."

He died on May 15, 1995, in Asunción.

== Others ==
Ruiz Apezteguia appears as a character in the television film One Man's War (1991), with Anthony Hopkins, as the director of the newspaper that Joel Filártiga (Hopkins) comes to denounce the death of his son in hands of the dictatorship.
