= Eduardo Schaerer =

Paraguayan politician (1873–1941)

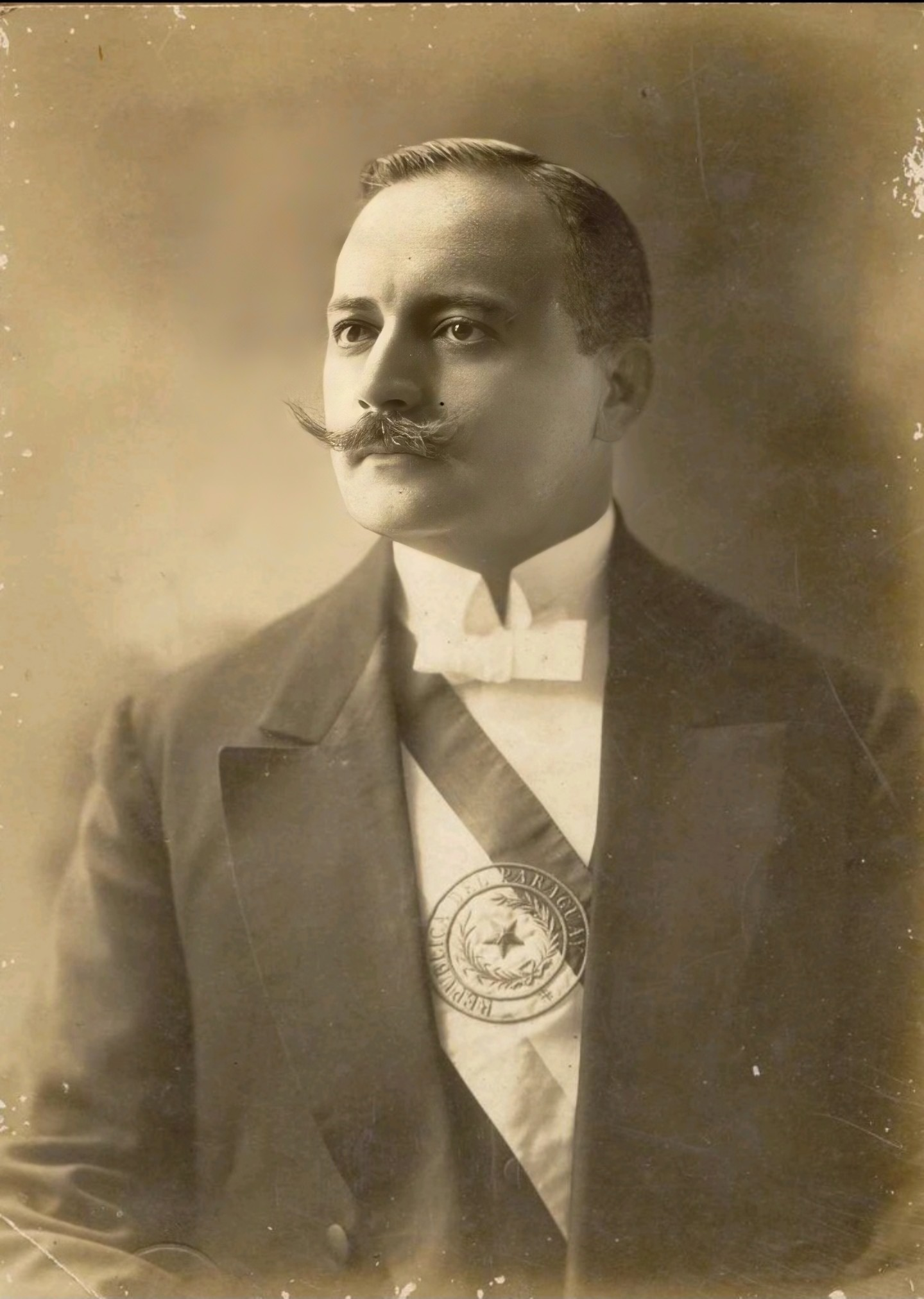
- Portrait, c. 1912

25th President of Paraguay
- In office 15 August 1912 – 15 August 1916
- Vice President: Pedro Bobadilla
- Preceded by: Emiliano González Navero
- Succeeded by: Manuel Franco

Personal details
- Born: 2 December 1873 Caazapá, Paraguay
- Died: 12 November 1941 (aged 67) Buenos Aires, Argentina
- Party: Liberal Party
- Spouse: Maria Mathilda Heisecke (m. 1895)
- Children: 7, including Arturo

Eduardo Schaerer Vera y Aragón (2 December 1873 – 12 November 1941) was a Swiss-Paraguayan businessman, publisher, and politician. He served as President of Paraguay from 1912 to 1916 for the Liberal Party, respectively briefly as the Minister of the Interior from March 22, 1912, to August 15, 1912, before assuming office as president. He previously served as mayor of Asuncion from 1908 to 1911.

After his presidency, he continued to serve in the Senate of Paraguay from 1921 to 1940. He served as the President of the Senate in 1919-1920. Schaerer founded the newspaper La Tribuna in 1925, one of the most important daily newspapers of Paraguay.

== Early life and education ==
Schaerer was born on 2 December 1873 in Caazapá, Paraguay, ⁣to Santiago Schaerer (born Jakob Otto Schaerer; 1834-1895) and Elizabeth Vera y Aragón. His father originally hailed from Vordemwald, Switzerland, where he was previously married but lost his wife in the birth of their third child. He immigrated to Uruguay in 1862 and founded the colony Nueva Helvecia. After living in Argentina, he came to Paraguay in 1869. Schaerer held dual citizenship of Switzerland and Paraguay. He completed elementary education in his hometown before graduating from Colegio Nacional de la Capital in Asuncion.

== Career ==
From a young age, Schaerer was engaged in business, politics, and journalism. Schaerer co-founded the newspaper El Diario together with Gualberto Cardús, Adolfo Huerta, and Adolfo Riquelme. In 1925, Schaerer founded La Tribuna, one of the most important daily newspapers in Paraguay's history.

== Presidency of Paraguay ==
Eduardo Schaerer had been seen as the only one capable of guiding the country through the difficult circumstances that became apparent in the future. He assumed the presidency of the Republic from 15 August 1912 until 15 August 1916. His cabinet was composed of: Eusebio Ayala, Foreign Affairs; Manuel Gondra, War and Navy; Félix Paiva, Justice, Culture, and Public Instruction; Gerónimo Zubizarreta, Finance; and José P. Montero, Interior. There were some changes later: Gondra went to the chancery, Colonel Patricio A. Escobar War and Navy; Eusebio Ayala to Treasury, Culture and Public Instruction, and Belisario Rivarola to Justice.

== Political work ==
In the year 1904, he was one of the main civilian leaders of the liberal insurgency. He acted in Pilar, Ñeembucú. Schaerer was one of the signatories of the manifesto read “to the People”, on 4 July 1908, with which the "radical" group tried to justify the uprising that was planned by Mayor Albino Jara. He was mayor of the municipality of Asunción between 5 July 1908 and 17 January 1911. He also served as Director of Customs, Minister of the Interior (1912), and Senator (1921). On 7 August of that year, he signed the invitation to participate in the assembly of that style, which took place on the 15th at the National Theatre, which at that time intended to "constitute a large ruling party."

Schaerer was the first civilian president who managed to finish their mandate without any coups or military uprisings. He had an extremely important role in the strengthening of institutions and the development of civil leaders in Paraguay, and is remembered as one of the great builders of the Guarani nation. With his government, a period of political stability and economic prosperity that lasted nearly a decade. In 1912, Dr. Manuel Franco was appointed rector of the University. In 1913, the resignation of Dr. Teodosio González was accepted from his chair of Criminal Law. Simeon Carísimo was director of the National School of Villarrica, where Francisco Ruffinellis began to hold the chair of Geography.

It began operating the C.A.L.T. (predecessor of the A.N.D.E.), the first electric lighting system in the country, and the first telephone system and electric tram. At the beginning of his administration, Paraguay had 180 km of railways that reached the city of Villarrica. In 1916, at the end of his government, they counted nearly 700 km of railways. In 1913, the railroads reached the city of Encarnacióm and assembled with the rail line, enabling the city of Posadas, Argentina, to allow the fast arrival of Paraguayan products to the Atlantic Ocean. The construction of a railway network began in the Department of Concepción, which was intended to connect with the Brazilian system and the new railway company Carlos Casado in the Chaco region. The construction of the branch to Abaí was of utmost importance, connecting Paraguay with Brazil and securing a stable route to the ocean for exporting products. Manuel Gondra, with his ministers and Eusebio Ayala, was the precursor to the development of this country and a new geopolitical concept for Paraguay. In this regard, also in 1915, he was presented the first study for the hydroelectric development of the Saltos del Guaira, a precursor idea of the current Itaipu Dam.

In the urban sphere, during his tenure, a new Municipal Organic Law was enacted in Asuncion, and numerous public works began, marking a period of major urban transformations that took effect. During his administration, a new Municipal Organic Law came into force. Several public works were carried out, such as improving public parks, street paving, demolition and relocation of the old central market, demolition of the former House of Governors, to open a Centennial Walk.

In the educational field, by decree, it included the learning of English in the secondary school curriculum. Villarrica, Encarnacion, Pillar, also in Barrero Grande: the first rural normal schools in three of the historic villas were created. It was the first Paraguayan president since Carlos Antonio Lopez to send a scholarship to Europe and the United States. During his government, he sent more than 200 Paraguayans to important European universities, among whom we can mention promising men like Silvio Pettirossi, Bruno Guggiari, Nicolas Sarubbi, Tomas Romero Pereira, Pedro Ciancio, Pedro Calunga, Anselmo Jover Peralta, and many others.

Defense regarding the aid was promoted to veterans and June 23, 1915, the Military Academy, which would be essential for the formation of a high-level military class would defend the Chaco years later, was created. In 1913, during his tenure, the former American President Theodore Roosevelt visited Paraguay. In the Judiciary order, Dr. Cecilio Báez was appointed to the Superior Court, Federico Chaves was appointed prosecutor of crime, and Luis Ruffinelli was appointed defender of poor inmates in 1914. In August 1915, Dr. Enrique Bordenave assumed the general secretariat of the presidency. During the same year, he adopted the curriculum of the School of Commerce, and it was expanded to the law of regulation of secondary and higher education.

The cultural situation of the country received motivation encouraged by Don Manuel Gondra, the "thinking man", one of the most important intellectual men of that time. Schaerer signed the appointments of poets and artists, as Rubén Darío, Narciso Colmán, Leopoldo Jimenez Ramos, Eloy Fariña Núñez, Delfín Chamorro, Manuel Ortiz Guerrero, Modesto Delgado Rodas, Justo Pastor, Federico García, among others. One of the most significant things was the continuing number of laws, beginning in the year 1913. These are distinguished: the permission to rid the public post office of San Lorenzo Ñu Guazú in (1912); one in which the acquisition of materials for the Museum of Natural History in (1913), and another one that set the continuation of the reconstruction work of the Oratory (Pantheon of the Heroes).

On January 1, 1915, people in Asuncion were awakened in the early hours by an uprising led by Freire Gomes Esteves and his brother, Luis Freire Esteves. As Colonel Manuel J. Duarte was absent, the military commanders were a captain, a lieutenant, and a sergeant. They captured the president, but the attempt failed. Schaerer was the first civilian President who managed to complete his mandate without conspiracies or military uprisings.

== Personal life ==
On 14 September 1895, Schaerer married Maria Matilde Heisecke Eguzquiza (1878-1964), a daughter of Christian Heisecke, a German-born diplomat and consul general of the Austro-Hungarian Empire. Her mother hailed from Asuncion. They had seven children:

- Maria Isabel Schaerer Heisecke (1 July 1896 – 11 June 1995), married Jose Costa Rodriguez
- Delia Rosa Schaerer Heisecke (11 June 1898 – 15 March 1976), married Jose Balteyro Martin
- Eduardo Cristian Schaerer Heisecke (b. 1900, d. ?)
- Ernesto Antonio Schaerer Heisecke (b. 1903, d. ?)
- Arturo Oscar Schaerer Heisecke (7 October 1907 – 17 December 1979), director of La Tribuna after his father and a recipient of the Maria Moors Cabot Prize, a journalism award from Columbia University (1953)
- Carlos Santiago Schaerer Heinecke (b. 1909, d. ?)
- Adolfo Manuel Schaerer Heinecke (22 April 1912 – July 1957)

Schaerer died on 12 November 1941 in exile in Buenos Aires, Argentina.

Political offices
Preceded by Pedro P. Peña	President of Paraguay; 1912–1916	Succeeded by Manuel Franco
