= José Vales =

Argentine journalist and writer

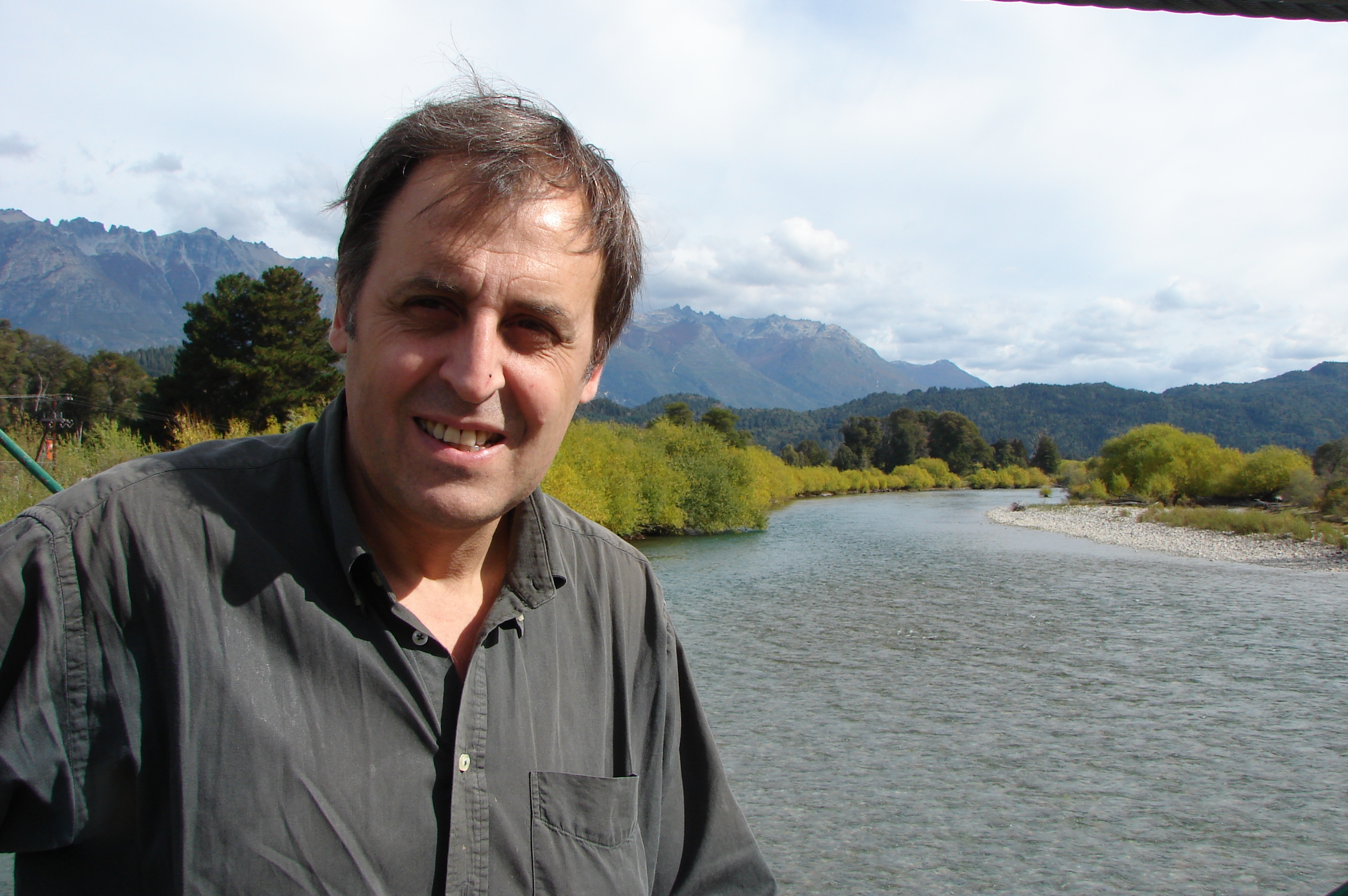
- Mr. Vales in the Argentinian countryside
- Born: José Vales; San Martín, Buenos Aires, Argentina
- Education: National University of Lomas de Zamora
- Occupations: Journalist, writer
- Years active: 1985 – present

José Vales (born March 26, 1962, in Buenos Aires) is an Argentinian journalist and writer.

He was born in 1962, in General San Martín, province of Buenos Aires. He was a correspondent in South America and Europe for several Latin American media. His coverage and investigations earned him distinguished international awards, such as the María Moors Cabot Award in 2007, given by Columbia University, and the Ortega y Gasset Award in Spain, in 2001.

In 2002 he received a special mention for his work on human rights from the ICIJ (International Consortium Investigative Journalistes).

In 2012 he was awarded by the Latin American Studies Association (LASA) for his contribution and public debate in Latin America.
