= Hugh O'Shaughnessy =

Irish journalist (1935–2022)

Hugh O'Shaughnessy (21 January 1935 – 1 March 2022) was an English journalist and writer.

== Biography ==
O'Shaughnessy was born in Reading, Berkshire of Irish parents. His father, Charles, was a porter at the Home Office, and his mother, Mary (nee Donovan), was an administrative assistant. He was educated at the Catholic St Benedict’s school in Ealing and Worcester College, Oxford where he received a BA in Modern Languages. For over 40 years he wrote for major newspapers including The Economist, The Observer, The Independent, The Irish Times, the Financial Times and most frequently The Guardian; and he made many reports for BBC News. O'Shaughnessy published a number of books and articles focusing on Latin American politics, making many trips to Central and South America to study social and political issues. He was a friend of Chilean president Salvador Allende. He was also the author of commentaries on the politics of Catholicism. He was founder of the Latin America Bureau.

O'Shaughnessy won several awards, including two British Press Awards, the 1986 Maria Moors Cabot prize for journalistic contributions to inter-American understanding and the Wilberforce Medallion from the city of Hull. He was recognised by the Columbia University Graduate School of Journalism in the United States.

He lived in London. He married Georgina Alliston (1937–2011, daughter of architects Jane Drew and James Alliston) in 1961, and they had four children: Frances, Thomas, Matthew and Luke. O'Shaughnessy died on 1 March 2022, at the age of 87.

== Publications ==
- Engagement to Europe, Open Library, Liberal Publications Dept (1965) OL20273667M
- What Future for the Amerindians of South America?, Minority Rights Group report (1973) ISBN 978-0-9031-1415-8
- Oil in Latin America, Financial Times (1976) ISBN 978-0-9006-7163-0
- Nicaragua: dictatorship and revolution, Latin America Bureau (1979) (with Jan Karmali and Andrew Pollak)
- Relations with Central American and Caribbean countries, Enstone, Oxon: Ditchley Foundation (1981)
- Towards a Democratic Central America, Fabian Society (1984) ISBN 978-0-7163-0499-9
- Grenada: revolution, invasion and aftermath, Sphere Books (1984) ISBN 978-0-7221-6561-4 also Hamish Hamilton (1984) ISBN 978-0-2411-1290-8
- Grenada: An Eyewitness Account of the US Invasion and the Caribbean History that Provoked It, Dodd Mead (1985) ISBN 978-0-3960-8524-9
- Latin Americans, BBC Books (1988) ISBN 978-0-5632-1393-2
- Around the Spanish Main: Travels in the Caribbean and the Guianas, Ebury Press (1991) ISBN 978-0-7126-3807-4
- East Timor: Getting Away with Murder?, London, British Coalition for East Timor (1994) ISBN 978-0-9523-1860-6
- Brazilian Energy: Privatisation and the Market, London, Financial Times Energy Publishing (c1997)
- Mexican Energy: A Market in Transition, London, Financial Times Energy Publishing (c1998)
- Pinochet: The Politics of Torture, Latin America Bureau (1999) ISBN 978-1-8993-6541-8 also NYU Press (2000) ISBN 978-0-8147-6201-1
- Chemical warfare in Colombia: The Costs of Coca Fumigation Latin America Bureau (2005) ISBN 978-1-8993-6568-5 (with Sue Branford)
- Taking on the Rich: The Art of Political Murder, New Statesman (2008) (with F. Goldman)
- The Priest of Paraguay: Fernando Lugo and the Making of a Nation, Zed Books (2009) ISBN 978-1-8481-3312-9 ISBN 978-1-8481-3313-6 ISBN 978-1-8481-3314-3 (with Edgar Venerando Ruiz Díaz)
