= Strengelbach =

- Municipality
- Flag Coat of arms
- Location of Strengelbach
- Location within Switzerland Location within Canton of Aargau
- Coordinates: 47°16′44″N 7°55′44″E
- Country: Switzerland
- Canton: Aargau
- District: Zofingen

Area
  - Total: 6.03 km^{2} (2.33 sq mi)
- Elevation: 445 m (1,460 ft)

Population (December 2006)
  - Total: 4,353
  - Density: 722/km^{2} (1,870/sq mi)
- Time zone: UTC+01:00 (CET)
  - Summer (DST): UTC+02:00 (CEST)
- Postal code: 4802
- SFOS number: 4285
- ISO 3166 code: CH-AG
- Surrounded by: Brittnau, Oftringen, Rothrist, Vordemwald, Zofingen
- Website: www.strengelbach.ch

Strengelbach is a municipality in the district of Zofingen in the canton of Aargau in Switzerland.

== Geography ==
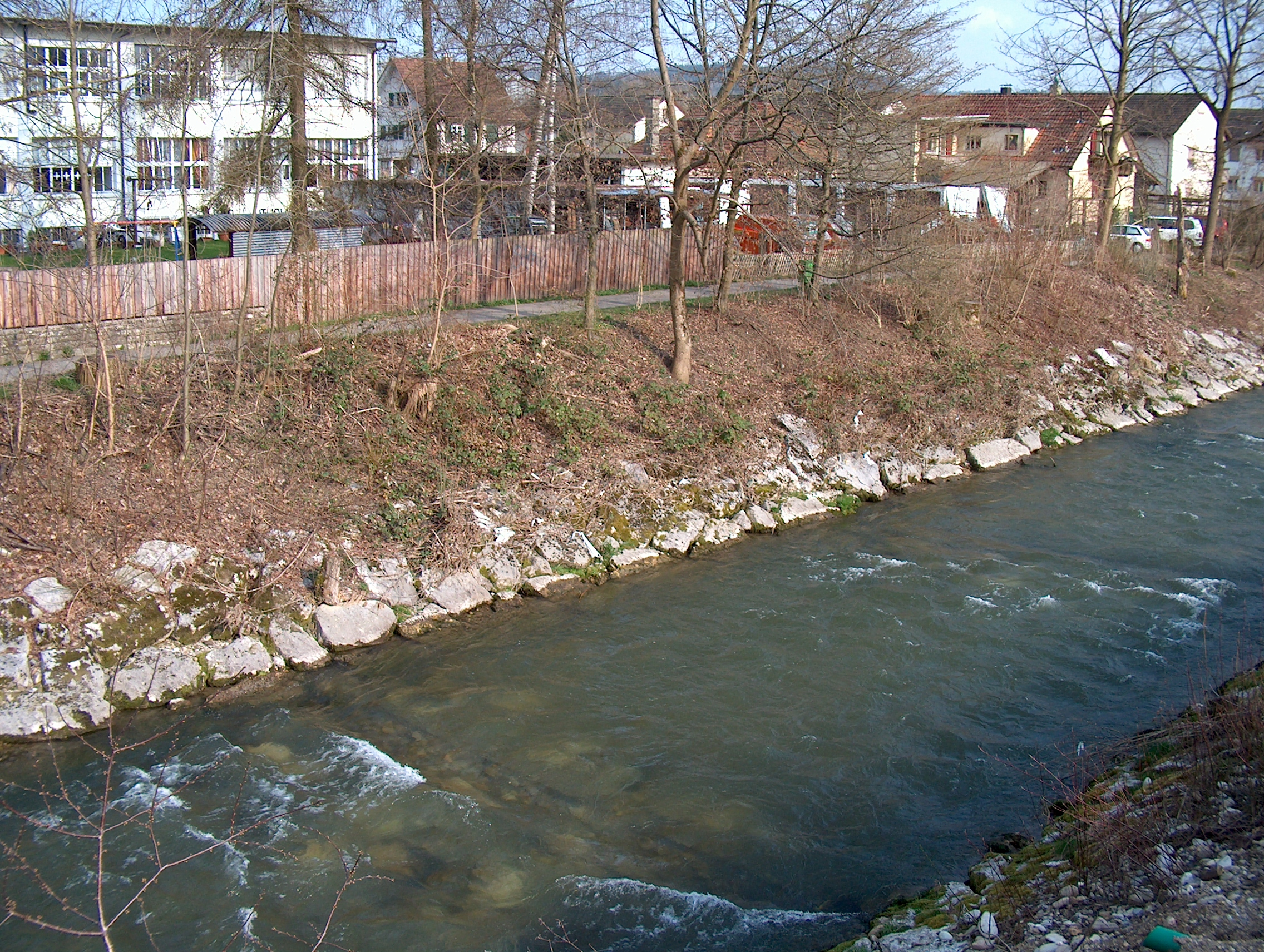
Wigger river between Strengelbach and Zofingen

Aerial view (1964)

Strengelbach has an area, as of 2009, of 6.01 square kilometers (2.32 sq mi). Of this area, 1.91 km^{2} (0.74 sq mi) or 31.8% is used for agricultural purposes, while 2.68 km^{2} (1.03 sq mi) or 44.6% is forested. Of the rest of the land, 1.38 km^{2} (0.53 sq mi) or 23.0% is settled (buildings or roads), 0.05 km^{2} (12 acres) or 0.8% is either rivers or lakes.

Of the built up area, industrial buildings made up 2.2% of the total area while housing and buildings made up 14.1% and transportation infrastructure made up 5.8%. Out of the forested land, 43.1% of the total land area is heavily forested and 1.5% is covered with orchards or small clusters of trees. Of the agricultural land, 21.5% is used for growing crops and 9.2% is pastures, while 1.2% is used for orchards or vine crops. All the water in the municipality is flowing water.

== Coat of arms ==
The blazon of the municipal coat of arms is Or a Bend wavy sinister Azure.

== Demographics ==
Strengelbach has a population (as of December 2020) of 4,859. As of June 2009, 24.8% of the population are foreign nationals. Over the last 10 years (1997–2007) the population has changed at a rate of 7.6%. Most of the population (as of 2000) speaks German (85.4%), with Italian being second most common ( 4.8%) and Portuguese being third ( 2.2%).

The age distribution, as of 2008, in Strengelbach is; 457 children or 10.2% of the population are between 0 and 9 years old and 508 teenagers or 11.3% are between 10 and 19. Of the adult population, 608 people or 13.5% of the population are between 20 and 29 years old. 620 people or 13.8% are between 30 and 39, 767 people or 17.1% are between 40 and 49, and 608 people or 13.5% are between 50 and 59. The senior population distribution is 485 people or 10.8% of the population are between 60 and 69 years old, 265 people or 5.9% are between 70 and 79, there are 154 people or 3.4% who are between 80 and 89, and there are 25 people or 0.6% who are 90 and older.

As of 2000, there were 199 homes with 1 or 2 persons in the household, 971 homes with 3 or 4 persons in the household, and 515 homes with 5 or more persons in the household. As of 2000, there were 1,711 private households (homes and apartments) in the municipality, and an average of 2.3 persons per household. In 2008 there were 668 single family homes (or 31.9% of the total) out of a total of 2,093 homes and apartments. There were a total of 60 empty apartments for a 2.9% vacancy rate. As of 2007, the construction rate of new housing units was 0.9 new units per 1000 residents.

In the 2007 federal election the most popular party was the SVP which received 33.29% of the vote. The next three most popular parties were the SP (23.41%), the FDP (13.15%) and the Green Party (8.8%). In the federal election, a total of 1,194 votes were cast, and the voter turnout was 43.8%.

The historical population is given in the following table:

Historical population
Year	Pop.	±%
1975	4,024	—
1980	3,750	−6.8%
1990	3,941	+5.1%
2000	4,174	+5.9%

== Economy ==
As of 2007, Strengelbach had an unemployment rate of 2.98%. As of 2005, there were 39 people employed in the primary economic sector and about 17 businesses involved in this sector. 313 people are employed in the secondary sector and there are 35 businesses in this sector. 792 people are employed in the tertiary sector, with 83 businesses in this sector.

In 2000 there were 2,298 workers who lived in the municipality. Of these, 1,796 or about 78.2% of the residents worked outside Strengelbach while 675 people commuted into the municipality for work. There were a total of 1,177 jobs (of at least 6 hours per week) in the municipality. Of the working population, 9.7% used public transportation to get to work, and 49.7% used a private car.

== Religion ==
From the 2000 census, 1,369 or 32.1% were Roman Catholic, while 2,124 or 49.8% belonged to the Swiss Reformed Church. Of the rest of the population, there were 10 individuals (or about 0.23% of the population) who belonged to the Christian Catholic faith.

== Education ==
In Strengelbach about 62% of the population (between age 25–64) have completed either non-mandatory upper secondary education or additional higher education (either university or a Fachhochschule). Of the school age population (in the 2008/2009 school year), there are 338 students attending primary school, there are 130 students attending secondary school in the municipality.

Strengelbach is home to the Gemeindebibliothek Strengelbach (municipal library of Strengelbach). The library has (as of 2008) 7,645 books or other media, and loaned out 23,931 items in the same year. It was open a total of 169 days with average of 8.5 hours per week during that year.
