= La Tribuna (Paraguay) =

Paraguayan newspaper

- Type: Newspaper
- Founded: December 31, 1925
- Political alignment: Liberal
- City: Asunción
- Country: Paraguay

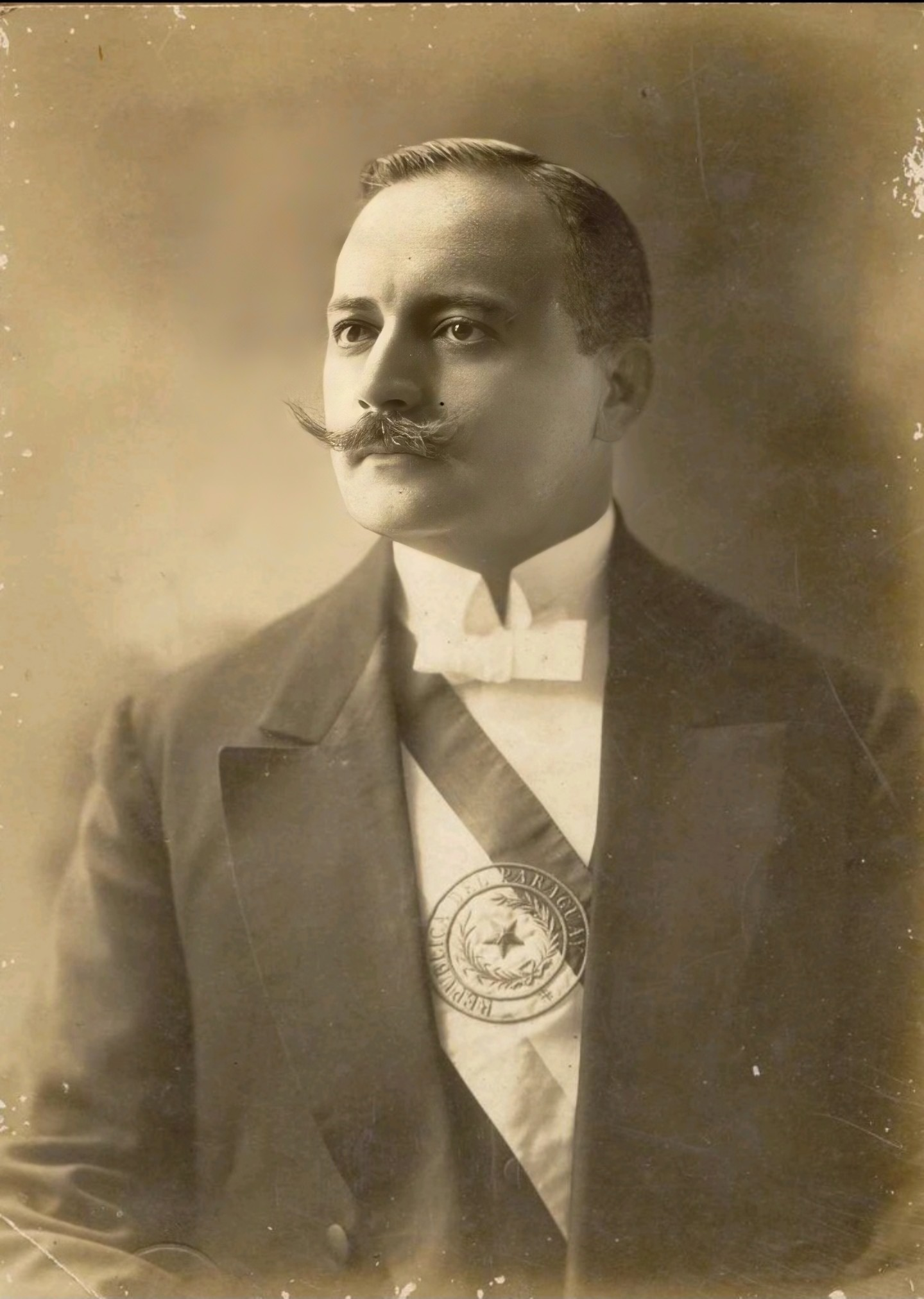
Eduardo Schaerer

La Tribuna was a Paraguayan newspaper published in Asunción. Although its most well-known relaunch took place in 1925 under Eduardo Schaerer, the title was already in circulation in 1915 under the administration of Juan Ferrari. This earlier version became notable for covering the Villa Morra parricide. It was one of the most important daily newspapers in Paraguay's history. It was founded in 1925 in Asunción by Eduardo Schaerer, and was one of the country's leading newspapers for five decades. La Tribuna was the first Paraguayan paper to be widely published across the country. Politically, La Tribuna was positioned between liberalism and traditional national politics. It opposed especially the dictatorial regimes of Higinio Morínigo and Alfredo Stroessner.

== Early antecedents (1915) ==
In July 1915, while the title was administered by Juan Ferrari, La Tribuna covered the double murder in the Asunción suburb of Villa Morra that contemporaries called the "parricide of Villa Morra". Contemporary press accounts reported that major dailies, including La Tribuna, demanded severe punishment and ran detailed coverage; an editorial titled "Justicia" ran in La Tribuna on 31 July 1915. Reports also described the relationship between Gastón Gadín and Ana Mayeregger and noted that a letter from Mayeregger urged Gadín not to kill his father; the case culminated with public executions in 1917.

During the dictatorial regimes, the editors became the target of persecution. Their fight in favor of the freedom of the press in Paraguay gained attention abroad. In 1953, the newspaper's director, Arturo Schaerer, received the María Moors Cabot Prize from Columbia University.

== History ==
La Tribuna was founded in Asunción on December 31, 1925, by former Paraguayan president Eduardo Schaerer. La Tribuna was not Schaerer's first media outlet. In 1905, Eduardo Schaerer had founded "The Journal" alongside Guadalberto Cardús Huerta and Adolfo Riquelme.

After the death of President José Félix Estigarribia in 1940, General Higinio Morínigo took power. Morínigo persecuted many politicians and well known members of the Liberal Party. This persecution, and that of the independent press resulted in the closure of La Tribuna several times. General Alfredo Stroessner ascended to the Presidency of Paraguay in 1954. During his presidency, La Tribuna continued to exist under similar circumstances and was constantly threatened. Schaerer asked for support from ambassadors and international contacts to keep the newspaper in operation. The continuing existence of La Tribuna worried the dictatorial government.

Starting in 1954, La Tribuna's director had the support of Carlos Ruiz Apezteguia, who denounced the abuse and crimes of the government and the breakdown of the rule of law. In November 1956, La Tribuna was raided and he was arrested, tortured and then abandoned in a boat on the shores of Clorinda, Argentina. Apezteguia began his exile in Montevideo, Uruguay. Under international pressure, he was allowed to return to Paraguay in 1959 and resume his journalistic work in the newspaper.

La Tribuna had agencies in many countries and grew from a circulation of 2,000 daily copies at its founding to more than 70,000 by the year 1965. In 1953, Arturo Schaerer and his newspaper were given the oldest international journalism award, the Maria Moors Cabot prize from Columbia University, for the paper's work as independent press publication placing itself in opposition to the totalitarian regimes in Paraguay.

Arturo Schaerer remained director of La Tribuna until May 15, 1972, when he was succeeded by Carlos Ruiz Apezteguia. At the time, Ruiz Apezteguia was a journalist and the husband of Schaerer's daughter, Myriam, and had been an involved partner and manager of La Tribuna for more than two decades. As director of La Tribuna, he denounced abuses in the negotiations associated with the Treaty of Itaipu and Yacyreta (with Brazil and Argentina respectively) on the construction of dams.

With the creation of ABC Color in 1967, La Tribuna began to lose its space in the Paraguayan written press. At the end of 1977, the newspaper was closed and returned a year later, under the administration of Oscar Paciello. In that management, the newspaper presented an analytical editorial line and criticized certain aspects of the dictatorship of Alfredo Stroessner. This positioning bothered the Executive Branch, which suspended its printing and circulation between june and july 1979. Upon returning to activities, the newspaper maintained his criticism, but with some caution. Due to strong competition with other media, La Tribuna was closed again in October 1980, with the purpose of modernizing. Returning in March 1981, it presented a content with new printing techniques, but financial problems caused the quality of the newspaper to gradually decrease. After 57 years of existence, La Tribuna was closed on September 24, 1983 and its facilities were sold to the Nicolás Bo Group which in 1984 inaugurated the Noticias.

== Modern days ==
In 2022, 39 years after it had ceased publication, La Tribuna announced its return in a digital format. It stated its continued commitment to its ideals of independent journalism and opposition to corrupt and inefficient governments.
