= Danilo Arbilla =

Uruguayan journalist

Danilo Arbilla (born 1943 in Casupá) is a Uruguayan journalist and entrepreneur. He was a former President of the Inter American Press Association who had shared the 1992 Maria Moors Cabot prize.
