= Lucia Newman =

Chilean-American journalist

- Born: 18 February 1952 (age 74); London
- Citizenship: United States; Chile
- Occupation: Journalist
- Notable credit: Maria Moors Cabot prize from Columbia University
- Spouse: Demetrio Olaciregui
- Children: Pia and Laura (Laurita)

Lucia Newman (born 18 February 1952 in London) is a broadcast journalist based in Santiago, Chile, currently working for Al Jazeera English. Previously, she was a long-standing reporter for CNN.

== Career ==
=== Awards and acclaim ===
In 1991, she received the Maria Moors Cabot prize from Columbia University for contributing to "the advancement of press freedom and inter-American understanding".

In March 1997, Newman became the first United States journalist in 27 years to have permanent residence in Cuba. However, after Newman's first news broadcast, Ninoska Pérez Castellón criticised her for not interviewing people who were against the Cuban government. Pérez wanted Newman to show Cuba as a "normal place", not a "rogue nation".

The North-South Institute praised her reporting and wrote that because she knows several languages, "she can find out things others cannot". Newman is fluent in English, Spanish, Portuguese and French. Both parents spoke German, Russian, Spanish, English and French. In addition, her father spoke Japanese and Portuguese; her mother spoke Italian and Swedish.

=== CNN ===
Newman worked for CNN for 20 years and reported from countries throughout Latin America. In 1997 she became the first US media correspondent to be allowed to open a news bureau in Cuba, where she lived for nine years while also covering other parts of Latin America.

In 1987, she was in Panama, and on 16 September, the Panamanian government expelled her from the country after a mob saw her grinning during an interview with Manuel Noriega. Noriega called her a "disinformer".

She was a correspondent in Nicaragua during 1985 to 1989 and in Chile from 1989 to 1993. From 1993 to 1997, she was the head of bureau in Mexico.

=== Al Jazeera English ===
In 2006, she left CNN for Al Jazeera English, in the run-up to its launch. She has been with the channel ever since. She is now the Latin America editor, based in Buenos Aires in Argentina, but also continues to appear regularly on-air.

In 2013 alone, she has conducted studio-interviews, for the series Talk to Al Jazeera, with the President of Uruguay and the former President of Chile and has presented, for the series Al Jazeera Correspondent, an extended piece of reportage on the curious institution that is the Colonia Dignidad, as well as conventional news-reporting, as a correspondent in several countries, plus live studio-links.

== Personal life ==
=== Early life ===
Newman was born on 18 February 1952 in London, of US and Chilean parentage. When they met, all foreign journalists and diplomats were housed at the Metropol Hotel in Moscow, to make it simpler for the Russian government to keep tabs on everyone. Her mother, Lucia Meza, was a junior cultural attaché and her father, Joseph Newman, was bureau chief for the New York Herald Tribune. They were introduced by Walter Cronkite, who served as match-maker, for they never would have married if Cronkite had not interceded on her father's behalf, as her mother said. Both were life-long writers on foreign affairs. Both parents eventually had to leave Moscow: her father, for criticising the regime and her mother when Chile severed diplomatic relations with the Soviet Union. As Bureau Chief for the New York Herald Tribune, the pair moved to Berlin for three years, and then to London for three years, where Lucia and her two sisters were born. The family then moved to New York, after spending three years in Buenos Aires. Joseph Newman worked at the United Nations, writing his own by-line on the editorial page of the NY Herald Tribune. The family moved to Bronxville, NY, when the Tribune collapsed after an extended strike, bringing to an end the longest-running newspaper in US history. Lucia went to elementary school at PS #8 in Bronxville, NY, watching her father, in her current events class, weekly interview prominent national and foreign leaders- on the first talking news show in New York: Faces and Places in the News. After the 7th grade, Lucia and her family moved to Washington, DC., where her father started the Book Division of US News & World Report. After high school, Lucia moved to Santiago, Chile, to enroll at the University of Chile.

=== Education ===
Newman said in an interview, "I didn't consider myself of a particular nationality;" in the United States, she felt like a "foreigner." During her holidays, she spent much of her vacation in Chile with her large extended family. Upon graduating high school, she studied journalism at the University of Chile in Santiago. After General Augusto Pinochet’s coup d'état on 11 September 1973, Newman discovered that her professors and colleagues started to vanish.

Calling this "scary, no, terrifying," Newman moved to Australia, where she landed a job at the Chilean Embassy in Australia, serving as a Spanish–English translator. The University of New South Wales accepted her "tuition-free" as a student. In April 1979, she received a bachelor's degree in communication from the University of New South Wales.

=== Family ===
Newman was married to the Panamanian official and documentary-maker, Demetrio Olaciregui. They have two daughters, Pia and Laura (Laurita). Newman now lives in Santiago, Chile, while the family is based in Argentina.
