= Santiago Schaerer =

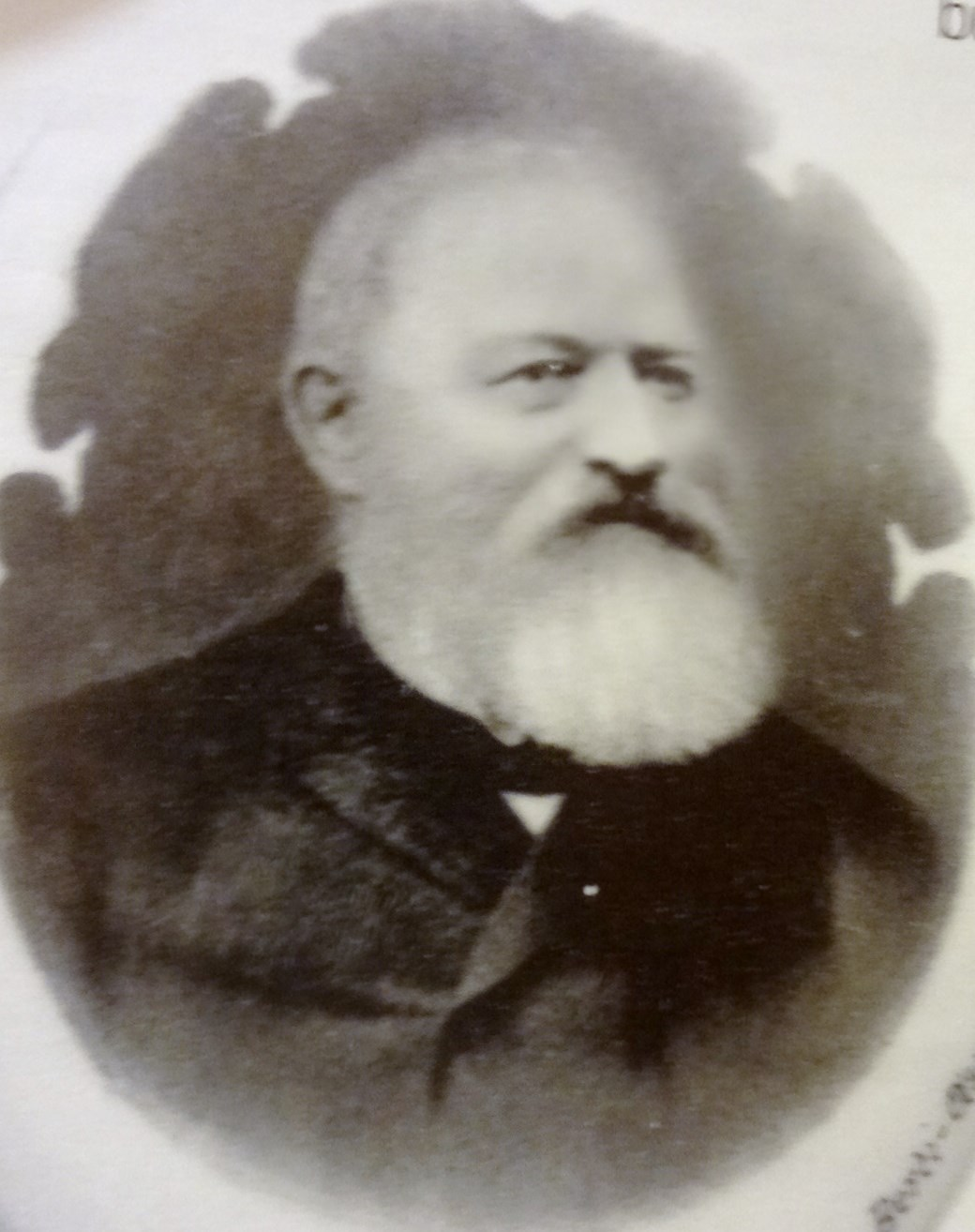
- Schaerer in 1890
- Born: Jakob Otto Schärer; 6 June 1834; Vordemwald, Aargau, Switzerland
- Died: 28 January 1895 (aged 60); Asunción, Paraguay
- Occupations: Businessman; colonizer; trader
- Known for: Founder of Nueva Helvecia and San Bernardino, Paraguay
- Spouses: Katharina Karoline Müller (m. 1855; died 1861) Elizabeth Vera y Aragon (m. 1869)
- Children: 5, including Eduardo Schaerer

Santiago Otto Schaerer Kuenzli (né Jakob Otto Schärer; 6 June 1834 – 28 January 1895) was a Swiss trader, settler and important colonizer in South America. He was the founder and administrator of several Swiss colonies, most prominently Nueva Helvecia in Uruguay and San Bernardino in Paraguay. He was the father of the 25th president of Paraguay Eduardo Schaerer and grandfather of businessman and journalist Arturo Schaerer.

== Early life and education ==
Schaerer was born Jakob Otto Schärer on 6 June 1834, in Vordemwald, Switzerland to Jakob Schärer, the municipal clerk of the village, and Johanna Barbara (née Künzli). He attended the local public schools in Vordemwald and Zofingen.

== Career ==
He sailed from Hamburg in 1862 and arrived in Montevideo, Uruguay. Together with other Swiss settlers created Nueva Helvecia, the first Swiss colony in Uruguay. Then he travelled through Argentina, Carmen de Patagones and Santa Fe, and settled in 1869 in Paraguay, in the area of Caazapá, where he married Elizabeth Vera and had two other sons: Santiago Guillermo and Eduardo Schaerer. The latter would eventually become President of Paraguay and one of the most influential politicians in the history of this country. Years later his other sons, Emil Jakob and Hans Otto, came from Switzerland and also settled in Paraguay.

He continued his colonizing work in Paraguay in times of Bernardino Caballero, with the foundation of San Bernardino, Paraguay, the first German and Swiss colony in Paraguay, 24 August 1881. He continued on founding cities like Benjamin Aceval and Yegros.

== Personal life ==
In 1855, Schaerer married Katharina Karoline Müller (1828–1861). They had three children;

- Jakob Emil Anton Schaerer Mueller (né Schärer; 1856–1929)
- Hans "Juan" Otto Schaerer Mueller (né Schärer; 1857–1935)
- Ernst Julius Schaerer Mueller (né Schärer; 1861–1861), died in childbirth

Katharina died in childbirth to their third son. After his emigration to South America, he married secondly to Isabel Vera y Aragón (1850–1876). They had three more children;

- Santiago Guillermo Schaerer Vera y Aragón (1871–1929)
- Eduardo Emilio Schaerer Vera y Aragón (1873–1941), who served as the 25th President of Paraguay
- Isabel Schaerer Vera y Aragón (born 1875)

Schaerer died 28 January 1895 in Asunción, Paraguay aged 60. He retained dual citizenship of Paraguay and Switzerland.
