= S. Lynne Walker =

American journalist

- Born: S. Lynne Walker; Atlanta, Georgia, U.S.
- Education: University of Hawaiʻi(BA)
- Occupation: Journalist
- Years active: 1975–present

S. Lynne Walker is an American journalist who was the longtime Mexico City bureau chief for Copley News Service.

== Early life and education ==
Walker is a native of Atlanta, Georgia. She graduated from the journalism program at the University of Hawaiʻi in 1977.

== Career ==
Walker began her first journalism job, at The Honolulu Advertiser, when she was 18 years old. After 2 and a half years there, she took a position at the Tampa Bay Times, where among other things she covered the murder trials of Ted Bundy.

She then worked as a business writer at the Sacramento Union. From there, she moved to the San Diego Union-Tribune, for which she covered the Persian Gulf War. While at the Union-Tribune, Walker began covering Mexico.

In 1993, Walker joined Copley News Service, where she worked for 15 years. As Copley's Mexico City Bureau Chief, she covered the 1994 armed Zapatista uprising, the election of President Vicente Fox, and Pope John Paul II's visits to Mexico. She also wrote about such topics as Mexico's endangered peyote crop and same-sex unions in Coahuila.

Walker has been Vice President of the Institute of the Americas since 2008. She coordinates the institute's media training activities and is in charge of its media relations. She is also the director of its China-Latin America program.

== Other professional activities ==
In 2007, Walker took part in a discussion titled "The State of Politics, Law, and Security in Mexico: Implications for U.S. Immigration Policy." She talked about Felipe Calderón's recent activities –including the arrest and deportation of gang leaders and drug kingpins and massive military efforts to crush drug violence in Michoacán and Guerrero – which lead to the question: "Is Felipe Calderón going to bring law and order to a violence-wracked Mexico?" Walker noted the severe impact of Mexico's violence and crime on tourism, investment, and emigration to the U.S. (for example, Oaxaca's hotel occupancy rate was 3 percent). She also spoke about the need to end the cycle of official corruption in Mexico.

In connection with a 2009 presentation at the institute by members of the Committee to Protect Journalists, Walker wrote about the murder and disappearance of journalists at the U.S.–Mexican border: "Since 2000, 24 Mexican journalists have been killed. In the past three years alone, seven journalists have disappeared, making Mexico the only country in the region where journalists have been reported missing. CPJ now classifies Mexico as one of the most dangerous countries in the world for journalists. Without a doubt, it is the most dangerous country in Latin America." She also addressed this subject in an interview on Nicaraguan television.

Walker was a speaker at the Press Freedom Summit of the Americas at the ASNE Annual Convention in San Diego on 4–9 April 2011.

In October 2012, Walker spoke at the Institute of Latin American and Caribbean Studies at the Southwest University of Science and Technology, describing the Institute of the Americas' efforts to "build understanding, create opportunity and improve people's life among countries."

Walker was a judge for the first annual Jack F. Ealy Latin American Scientific Journalism Award, the first science journalism award in Latin America, presented by the Institute of the Americas and the Fundacion Ealy Ortiz.

At the Institute of the Americas, Walker has participated in a number of seminars, discussions, screenings, and other events, including a panel on "Freedom of Expression and the Persecution of Journalists" and an International Media in Danger workshop.

== Membership ==
Walker is a member of the 'Report an Error' Alliance, an ad hoc group of individuals and organizations that call for every online news story to be accompanied by an icon allowing readers to report errors contained therein. "I believe the media has an obligation to report and correct errors," she has written. "By doing so, we enhance our credibility with our audiences."

== Honors and awards ==
In 1989, Walker received the Gerald Loeb Award for Medium Newspapers for a five-part series entitled "The Invisible Work Force," about the Mixtec Indians who migrated from Mexico to farms in southern California.

In 1997, Walker received a National Headliner Award for a 14-part serial narrative, "Journey to the Promised Land," about illegal immigration from Mexico to the U.S.

In 1999, Walker won second place in the Headliner Awards for feature writing for a news service or syndicate.

In 2004, Walker was a finalist for the Pulitzer Prize for National Reporting. This honor was accorded in recognition of her four-part series "Beardstown: Reflection of a Changing America," about the mass influx of Hispanic workers into an Illinois town.

For the same series, Walker won the 2004 Freedom Forum/American Society of Newspaper Editors Award for Outstanding Writing on Diversity. This award was also her Beardstown series, about which the judges commented: "With blunt honesty, the writer delivers a powerful, intimate account of what happens to a town changed by an influx of immigrants. It is a slice of America also written about by others, yet in this case delivered in a compelling way that offers a deeper understanding."

In 2005, she won a Headliner Award for feature writing.

Walker won a 2005 Maria Moors Cabot prize from the School of Journalism at Columbia University, which praised her for going "to extraordinary lengths to find original ways of telling the remarkable stories of ordinary people whose voices might otherwise not be heard....Among the many correspondents who cover the uneasy relationship between the United States and the countries south of the border, Walker stands out as one of the very few who manages to fully convey the human side of the story....With a natural sympathy for the underdog and a keen eye for detail, and by probing the depths of Latin American culture and society, Walker gives readers a full and unblemished view of and greater insight into the region."
