= Arturo Schaerer =

Paraguayan businessman and journalist (1907–1979)

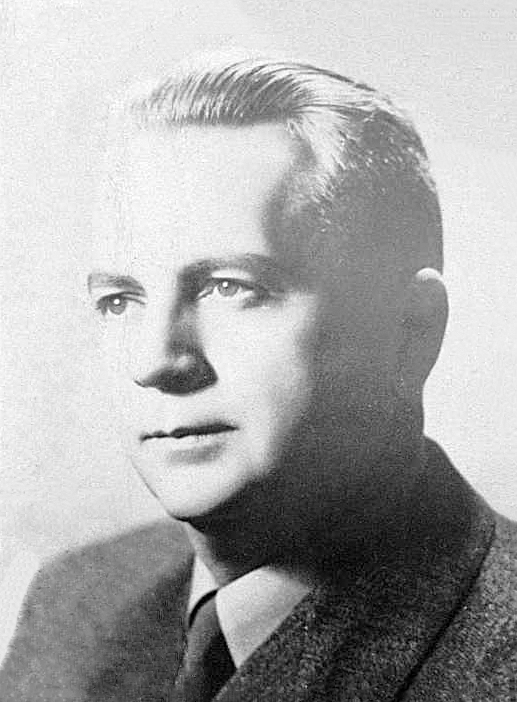
- Arturo Schaerer in 1953
- Born: Arturo Oscar Schaerer Heisecke; October 7, 1907; Asunción, Paraguay
- Died: December 17, 1979 (aged 72); Asunción, Paraguay
- Citizenship: Paraguay, Switzerland
- Occupations: Businessman, publisher and journalist
- Spouse: Maria Angelica Ayala Cabeda (m. 1931)
- Children: 4
- Father: Eduardo Schaerer
- Relatives: Santiago Schaerer (grandfather)

Arturo Oscar Schaerer Heisecke (October 7, 1907 – December 17, 1979) was a Paraguayan businessman, publisher and journalist. He was the son of the President of Paraguay, Eduardo Schaerer and grandson of Swiss colonizer Santiago Schaerer.

== Early life and education ==
Schaerer was born October 7, 1907, in Asunción, Paraguay to Eduardo and Matilde (née Heisecke) Schaerer. His father was the 25th President of Paraguay between 1912 and 1916 and founder of the daily newspaper La Tribuna. He was a grandson of Santiago Schaerer, a Swiss colonizer who hailed originally from Vordemwald, Switzerland and of Christian Heisecke, a native of Hamburg, Germany, a consul of Austria-Hungary and the Netherlands in Paraguay. Schaerer was, like his father, a dual citizen of Switzerland and Paraguay. He studied at Universidad Nacional de Asunción.

== Career ==
On December 31, 1925, his father Eduardo Schaerer founded the newspaper La Tribuna, which thereafter and for more than five decades would be the badge of the Paraguayan press. He started in journalism that day. After a while he lived in Buenos Aires, Argentina where he worked in the newspaper La Razon for further training in journalism. After the death of his father, he took over the administration and direction of the newspaper La Tribuna.

In 1940, following the death of President José Félix Estigarribia, General Higinio Morínigo became president. Morínigo began a persecution against many politicians and illustrious citizens of liberal extraction. The persecution to the independent press closed La Tribuna several times. Under General Alfredo Stroessner's dictatorship, La Tribuna continued to exist under similar circumstances and was constantly threatened. Schaerer had to resort many times to ambassadors and international contacts to keep the newspaper running. The continuing existence of La Tribuna bothered and worried the dictatorial government.

Despite the political unrest and the persecution to which La Tribuna was subjected in the following decades, the newspaper grew and consolidated as one of the most respected newspapers of the continent. La Tribuna had agencies in many countries and grew from having 2,000 daily copies in the times of its founding, to more than 70,000 by the year 1965, being that value until today greater than the current daily circulation of Paraguay. He also attempted to introduce the first television channel in Paraguay, before the National Television System, but the government did not grant permission. In 1953, all this difficult and arduous work for an independent press and opposition to totalitarian regimes in which was immersed Paraguay earned Arturo Schaerer and his newspaper the oldest international journalism award, the Maria Moors Cabot Prize from Columbia University, New York.

== Personal life ==
He was married to Maria Angelica Ayala Cabeda, Uruguayan and daughter of Araminto Ayala, General Consul of Uruguay in Paraguay, and Maria Angela Cabeda, daughter of Rafael Cabeda, renowned Brazilian political, liberator of slaves and great exponent of the Federalist Revolution in Rio Grande do Sul, Brazil. He had five children, Myriam Schaerer (married to Carlos Ruiz Apezteguia), Adalia, Arturo Rafael, Araminto and Eduardo W. Schaerer.

=== Last Years and Death ===
Arturo Schaerer remained the director of La Tribuna until 15 May 1972, when he was succeeded by Carlos Ruiz Apezteguia, a journalist and husband to his daughter Myriam Schaerer and intense partner and manager of La Tribuna for more than two decades. In 1983 La Tribuna, with other owners, become the newspaper Noticias. Arturo Schaerer died in Asunción on 17 December 1979.

== Awards ==
- International Journalism Award Maria Moors Cabot, Columbia University, 1953

== Literature ==
- Traces of Schaerer family. Review of Swiss Immigration to Paraguay and Rio de la Plata. Juan Emilio Escobar Schaerer y Celia Escobar Schaerer, 2007
- La Tribuna Archives
- Prensa Latinoamericana, Paraguay
