= Cynthia Hughes =

Grenadian journalist

- Died: 6 December 1989 (aged 72)
- Known for: Journalism
- Spouse: Alister Hughes
- Children: 3

Cynthia Hughes was a Grenadian journalist. She and her husband, Alister Hughes, co-edited and published The Grenada Newsletter. They are credited with publicizing the happenings during the 1983 overthrow of Maurice Bishop, which led to the American invasion of Grenada. Their newspaper was subscription only, and was not sold at newsstands.

Hughes wrote about Grenada before independence, Grenadian Independence, the armed take-over by the People's Revolutionary Government in 1979, the revolutionary rule and 1983 coups, the assassination of Prime Minister Maurice Bishop and members of his Cabinet and supporters, the United States invasion, the Grenada 17, and democracy.

Hughes and her husband were under 24-hour surveillance from June 19 to August 1981. In 1984, Columbia University gave their Maria Moors Cabot Award to Cynthia and Alister; the couple were the first husband-wife team to win the award. Hughes had three children. She died in 1989 at the age of 72. The University of the West Indies has a collection of Grenadian artifacts, documents, and other historical items in her name.
