= John Hoagland =

American photojournalist and war correspondent

- Born: June 15, 1947; San Diego, California, U.S.
- Died: March 16, 1984 (aged 36); Suchitoto, El Salvador
- Cause of death: Caught in crossfire, M60 machine gun
- Resting place: San Salvador
- Education: University of California, San Diego
- Occupation: Photojournalist
- Years active: 1970–1984
- Employer: Newsweek
- Known for: his documentation of civil conflicts in Nicaragua, Lebanon, and El Salvador
- Children: 1
- Awards: Maria Moors Cabot Prize

John Hoagland (June 15, 1947 – March 16, 1984) was an American photojournalist and war correspondent for Newsweek from San Diego, California, who was covering the Salvadoran Civil War in El Salvador at the time he was killed. He had covered other conflicts, including those in Nicaragua and Lebanon.

== Personal ==
John Hoagland was born in San Diego, California to Helen and Al Hoagland in 1947. Hoagland was the oldest of their five children. The family was native to San Diego, where John attended Helix High School and remained in 1965 at the University of California, San Diego. Hoagland studied under a world renowned scholar and author, Herbert Marcuse, who wrote Eros and Civilization along with One Dimensional Man. Marcuse, alongside another classmate of Hoagland's, Angela Davis, influenced Hoagland to become a journalist. During the Vietnam War, he applied for and received conscientious objector status. In 1970, Hoagland was at a massive anti-war movement in downtown Los Angeles, when the journalist Ruben Salazar was shot and killed by police. Hoagland was arrested along with his friends and his video equipment confiscated. He divorced and took his son Eros with him.

Hoagland's son, Eros Hoagland, is also a photographer who currently works in conflict zones around the globe.

== Career ==
John Hoagland published photos for the Associated Press, United Press International, the Gamma Liaison news photography agency and Newsweek magazine

Hoagland began his career just by joining anti-war protests. Almost a year after his son, Eros Hoagland, was born he went from passive protesting to active protesting. While working as a steel welder in San Francisco, Hoagland continued to develop as an amateur photographer. He took photographs of what he found interesting or, in some cases, corrupt. Hoagland, almost 30 years old now, went south, to Nicaragua to take photos of the Nicaraguan Revolution for Newsweek. He wanted to make a difference and get the story of this country out into the public to help the people who could not escape. After the killing of another reporter named Bill Stewart, Hoagland was one of few reporters who stayed to cover the destruction being caused in this now broken country. The partner of this journalist now needed someone else to work with, and Hoagland stepped up to help, entering a short career as a sound man. After his work had finished, he returned to still photos in 1980. He worked with reporter Ignacio Rodriguez from a Mexican newspaper and who was shot and killed by a sniper soon after in Lebanon. During another escapade, also in Lebanon, Hoagland and two other journalists drove over a mine and all three suffered severe injuries, the driver at the time, Ian Mates died a few hours after due to injury. Later on he journeyed to Beirut to photograph the withdrawal of the United States Marines and finally ended up in El Salvador, where he was killed.

== Death ==
Sauchitoto is located in San Salvador, El Salvador.

At the time of his death, John Hoagland was a contract photographer for Newsweek. On March 16, 1984, John Hoagland and Robert Nickelsberg of Time magazine, along with a few cameramen from CBS News, were entering an area of danger along a road between San Salvador and Suchitoto, El Salvador. The area had been restricted because of multiple gun fights starting, but the journalists were allowed entry "at their own risk" to reach the city of Suchitoto. Hoagland and company knew that the area made them vulnerable to ambushes. They entered the area and were ambushed, although there is no evidence as by who. The news teams took cover among small hills that were covered in grass, and as Hoagland went to kneel down he yelled that he had been hit. A single bullet from a large caliber M-60 weapon, as supplied by the US government to the El Salvadoran government, which hit Hoagland in his back, caused him to bleed out. The bullets continued to fly, kicking dust up as they swept past. Hoagland had died merely 15 seconds after being hit, but no one knew until after the firefight had been broken up by the Salvadoran army. The Salvadoran army fired an M-60 machine gun from across the street directly at the photographers taking cover in the brush. After the shooting stopped, one of the Salvadoran soldiers came over to the photographers and attempted to take the clothes off of Hoagland so he could disguise himself as a civilian once the approaching FMLN guerrillas came off the hill and attempted to capture them. Most of the Salvadoran soldiers had already retreated south along the road.

== Context ==
The civil war was started after the assassination of the Archbishop Óscar Romero on March 24, 1980. The Archbishop had been leading mass when he was killed, speaking to the soldiers that they should disobey orders to torture and murder, as it would only lead to their downfall. The war had also been stirred up by social inequality, the repressive military, and poverty that had spread throughout the country.

== Impact ==
John Hoagland was one of 35 journalists whose names appeared on "death lists" by Salvadoran death squads.

A total of 16 journalists were killed in the conflict besides Hoagland. The others who died covering the war were Richard Cross (Honduras), Oliver Rebbot (El Salvador), Ian Mates (El Salvador), Ignacio Rodriguez (El Salvador), Bill Stewart (Nicaragua), John Sullivan (El Salvador), Dial Torgerson (Honduras), Rene Tamsen (El Salvador), Jaime Suarez (El Salvador), Caesar Najorro (El Salvador), Linda Frazier (Nicaragua), Koos Koster (El Salvador), Jan Kuiper (El Salvador), Hans Ter Laag (El Salvador), and Johannes Willemsen (El Salvador).

== Reactions ==
Robert Nickelsberg, a fellow photographer from Time magazine, said "He was a good man who worked very hard, loved what he did and none of us really need this at this point, but those are the risks."

Ivan Montesinos, a Salvadoran reporter for UPI, states "He was no fool, when you went into the field with him, I felt safe because he knew how to move between the shots."

Ulises Rodriguez, a young inspired journalist, said "I must have been 10 years old when I saw a foreign journalist wandering around downtown... I asked what it took to be a photographer like him and he said study photojournalism and journalism. Years after, I found out that man was John Hoagland."

== In popular culture ==
The journalist and photographer 'John Cassady,' played by John Savage in the 1986 movie Salvador was loosely based on Hoagland.

== Awards ==
- Special Citation, Maria Moors Cabot Prize.
- Presidential Citation, Overseas Press Club.

== Publications ==
- El Salvador, edited by Harry Mattison and Susan Meiselas (1983);
- War Torn, edited by Susan Vermazen (1984);
- Witness to War, edited by Charles Clements (1984),
- and five cover photographs for Newsweek Magazine.

== See also ==
- Salvadoran Civil War
