= Alan Riding =

British author and journalist (1943–2026)

- Born: 8 December 1943; Rio de Janeiro, Brazil
- Died: 6 June 2026 (aged 82); Paris, France
- Education: Rossall School; Bristol University
- Occupations: Journalist; author
- Writing career
- Genre: Non-fiction
- Website: alanriding.com

Alan Riding (8 December 1943 – 6 June 2026) was a British author and journalist. He was a long-time foreign correspondent for The New York Times, ultimately as the paper's European cultural correspondent based in Paris. He is the author of And The Show Went On: Cultural Life in Nazi-Occupied Paris.

== Early life ==
Alan Riding was born in Rio de Janeiro, Brazil, on 8 December 1943. After spending his first 11 years in Brazil, Riding went to England to attend Rossall School, Lancashire, and later Bristol University. He was called to the bar at Gray's Inn before deciding to become a journalist.

== Career ==
Riding started with Reuters in New York City, covering the United Nations. In 1971, he left Reuters and moved to Mexico to work as a freelance reporter, principally for The Financial Times, The Economist, and The New York Times. In 1978, he joined The New York Times as Mexico City bureau chief. Before leaving Mexico for Brazil in 1984, he wrote Distant Neighbors: A Portrait of the Mexicans, on modern Mexico.

As the Rio de Janeiro bureau chief, Riding covered the transitions from military regimes to democracies in Brazil and many neighbouring countries as well as guerrilla wars and drug trafficking in Peru and Colombia.

In 1989, after a brief stint in Rome, he was named The New York Times's Paris bureau chief, which included coverage of the European Union and NATO. In 1995, he became the paper's European Cultural Correspondent, a post that involved covering all the arts in the region. During this period, he also co-authored (with Leslie Dunton-Downer) Essential Shakespeare Handbook and Opera. In 2007, Riding left journalism to write And The Show Went On, published by Knopf in 2010. It has also been published in Britain and has been translated into Spanish, Catalan, French, Polish, Chinese and Portuguese. Thereafter he devoted himself to writing for the theatre.

== Personal life and death ==
Riding lived in Paris with his wife Marlise Simons, who is a reporter for The New York Times. Riding died of cancer in Paris on 6 June 2026, aged 82.

== Awards ==
- 1981 Maria Moors Cabot Prize for Latin American Coverage
- 1992 Latin American Studies Association, Special Citation
- 2003 Order of the Aztec Eagle, Mexico
- 2011 Palau i Fabre International Essay Prize, Spain
- 2022 Honorary Doctor of Letters, University of Bristol, UK

== Books ==
- Distant Neighbors: A Portrait of the Mexicans. Knopf, New York, 1985; Vintage 1986. (ISBN 978-0307389053)
- Essential Shakespeare Handbook. DK, New York and London, 2004. (ISBN 978-0789493330)
- Eyewitness Companions: Opera. DK, New York and London, 2006. (ISBN 978-0756622046)
- And The Show Went On; Cultural Life in Nazi-Occupied Paris. Knopf, 2010; Vintage 2011. (ISBN 978-0307389053)
- Libertadores, Samsa Editions, Brussels, 2016.(ISBN 978-2-87593-112-2)
- Shakespeare: His Life and Works, DK, New York and London, 2021 (ISBN 978-0744035001)
- Opera: The Definitive Illustrated Story, DK, New and London, 2022 (ISBN 978-0744056310)
