= Michael Reid (journalist) =

English journalist (born 1952)

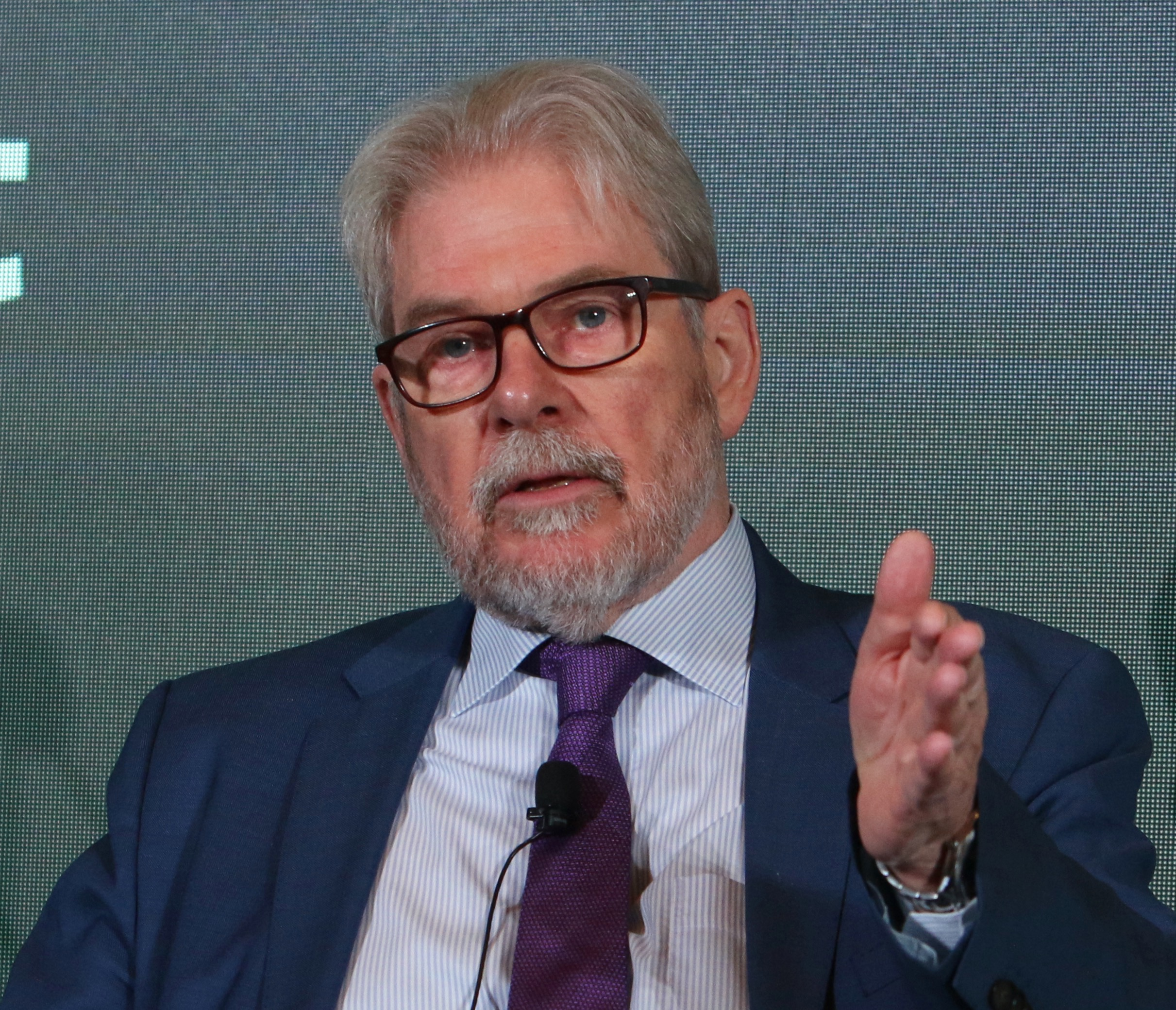
Reid in 2019

Michael Reid (born 1952) is an English journalist, writer and commentator on Latin American and Iberian affairs.

== Life and work ==
Born in Britain, Reid studied Politics, Philosophy and Economics at Balliol College, Oxford. He is currently a senior editor at The Economist, writing the "Bello" column on Latin America while also covering Spain. After a period in Lima between 2014 and 2016 he now lives in Madrid. Between 1999 and December 2013, he was the newspaper's Americas Editor, overseeing coverage of Latin America, the Caribbean and Canada. He is the author of 12 Special Reports for The Economist, most recently on Spain (July 2018) and Colombia (2015).

He started as a freelance journalist based in Lima in 1982, covering the Andean countries for The Guardian and the BBC, among other media outlets. He began writing for The Economist in 1990, as Mexico and Central America Correspondent, and in 1994 changed to cover consumer industries. Between 1996 and 1999 he was the paper's São Paulo Bureau Chief. Between 2000 and 2004 he also wrote a weekly column for Valor Econômico of Brazil and until 2013 wrote a monthly column for Poder magazine of Mexico.

His books include Forgotten Continent: The Battle for Latin America's Soul (2007), reissued in a fully revised and updated edition as Forgotten Continent: A History of the New Latin America (2017), and "Brazil: The Troubled Rise of a Global Power" (April 2014). He has been awarded the Maria Moors Cabot Prize by Columbia’s University’s Graduate School of Journalism and Brazil’s Order of the Southern Cross.

Michael Reid is a frequent speaker on Latin American affairs, having given lectures to businesses, think tanks and academic audiences in many countries. He has been interviewed for television, radio and print outlets, including CNN, BBC World TV, NPR, Globo (Brazil) and El País (Spain). He has given testimony to the United States Senate Foreign Relations Committee and the Foreign Affairs Committee of the British House of Commons.

== Books ==
- Forgotten Continent: The Battle for Latin America's Soul, Yale University Press, 2009. ISBN 978-0300151206
- Forgotten Continent: A History of the New Latin America, Yale University Press, 2017. ISBN 9780300224658
- Brazil: The Troubled Rise of a Global Power, Yale University Press, 2014. ISBN 9780300165609
- Spain: The Trials & Triumphs of a Modern European Country, Yale University Press, 2023. ISBN 2022950313
