= Jeremiah O'Leary =

American newspaper reporter and columnist

Jeremiah Aloysius Patrick O'Leary, Jr. (1919 – December 19, 1993) was an American newspaper reporter and columnist.

== Biography ==
He was born into a family of journalists. His father was a reporter, an uncle was an editor of the Washington Times-Herald, while a cousin, William McAndrew, became president of NBC News. He grew up in Washington, D.C. In 1937, he went to work for The Washington Star as a copy boy.

During World War II, he served as a U.S. Marine in the Pacific theater and fought in the invasions of New Britain, Guam and Peleliu. He also served in Korea during the Korean War as an information officer. He eventually rose to the rank of colonel in the Reserves, retiring in 1976. He was awarded the Bronze Star, Purple Heart and Legion of Merit.

After the war, he was a reporter for The Washington Evening Star, focusing on defense and foreign policy issues. In 1979, he became the paper's chief White House correspondent. When the Star folded in 1981, O'Leary joined the Reagan Administration as a special assistant to Deputy Secretary of State and later National Security Advisor William P. Clark, Jr. for eight months. Soon after the founding of The Washington Times in 1982, he joined that paper as a White House correspondent, became president of the White House Correspondents Association, and ended his career writing a weekly column of nostalgic reminiscences.
