= Guy Gugliotta =

American journalist and book author

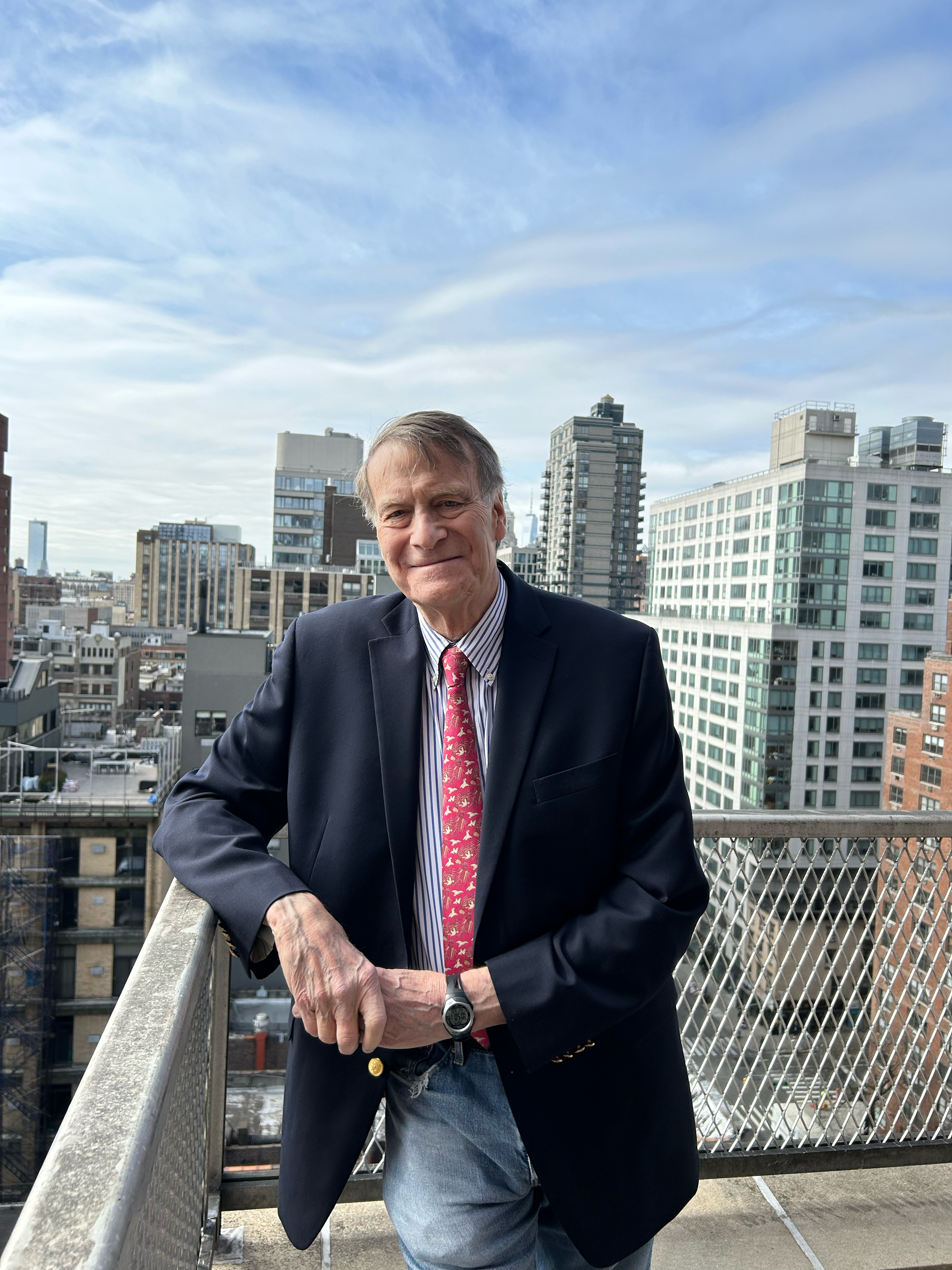
- Education: Columbia University BA, MIA
- Occupation: Writer
- Employer(s): Washington Post, Miami Herald, UPI
- Notable work: Grant's Enforcer: Taking Down the Klan, Swift Boats at War in Vietnam, Freedom's Cap, Kings of Cocaine
- Awards: Freedom's Cap, Kirkus A Best Nonfiction Book of the Year (2012), Investigative Reporters and Editors award (1989) w/Jeff Leen, Sigma Delta Chi Award (1989) w/Jeff Leen, Maria Moors Cabot Prize Gold Medal (1987), Penney-Missouri Award (1986), Nieman Fellow Harvard University (1982)

Guy Gugliotta is an American journalist and author, based in New York City. He reported for The Washington Post and others.

== Career ==
Gugliotta graduated from Columbia University in 1967. Drafted three months before graduation, he spent two years as a division and watch officer aboard an Atlantic Fleet destroyer and a year as Officer-in-Charge of a river patrol boat (Swift Boat) in the Mekong Delta. He was awarded three Bronze Stars, two with a combat V.

After Vietnam, Gugliotta returned to Columbia and earned a master's degree in International Affairs at the Columbia University School of International Affairs. He worked for United Press International for six years: as a reporter and editor for the New York local desk; then as UPI's Caribbean News Editor based in Puerto Rico; its chief correspondent in Argentina, where he covered the Dirty War; and as news editor for Brazil. In late 1978, he joined the Latin America Desk of the Miami Herald, covering the Sandinista Revolution, Argentina's Falkland Islands War and World Cup Soccer Championships and was the first U.S. correspondent for a major newspaper to report extensively about the Colombian cocaine cartels. He also covered the Iranian Revolution in 1978–1979, the Iran hostage crisis, the Soviet invasion of Afghanistan, and sectarian violence in Northern Ireland. In 1990 he joined The Washington Post, covering the Gulf War, Congress, including Clinton's impeachment, science and space.

== Awards, fellowships and service ==
- 2006-2021: American Association for the Advancement of Science. Judge for the AAAS annual science journalism awards.
- 2014: Santa Fe Institute. Science Journalism Fellow in residence.
- 2012: Freedom's Cap named a Best Nonfiction Book of the year by Kirkus.
- 2008-2009: Capitol Historical Society Fellow for research for Freedom's Cap.
- 1989: Investigative Reporters and Editors award with Jeff Leen for a newspaper series on the Medellín Cartel.
- 1989: Sigma Delta Chi Award. Investigative Reporting with Jeff Leen on the Medellín Cartel.
- 1987: Maria Moors Cabot Prize Gold Medal from Columbia University for reporting from Latin America.
- 1986: Penney-Missouri Award for best single newspaper story. Tracing the paths of two undocumented migrants from Latin America to working class Queens, N.Y.
- 1985: Alicia Patterson Foundation, fellowship to study Argentina's Dirty War.
- 1982-83: Nieman Fellowship, Harvard University.
- 1981: Overseas Press Club Bob Considine Award. News analysis on Central and South America, Iran.
- 1978: Tom Wallace Award, Inter-American Press Association. Human rights abuses in Argentina.
- 1970: Three Bronze Stars, two with a combat V.

== Personal life ==
Gugliotta is married to Carla Robbins, a university professor and journalist specializing in U.S. defense policy and foreign affairs who has shared in two Pulitzer Prizes. Their daughter Annie Gugliotta is a visual designer.

== Publications ==
=== As author and/or editor ===
- Grant's Enforcer: Taking Down the Klan. University of Georgia Press, 2025.
- Swift Boats at War in Vietnam. Stackpole Books, 2023.
- Freedom's Cap:The United States Capitol and the Coming of the Civil War. Hill and Wang, 2012.
- Kings of Cocaine: Inside the Medellín Cartel - An Astonishing True Story of Murder, Money and International Corruption. Simon & Schuster, 1989.
