= John M. Goshko =

American journalist

Josh Myron Goshko
- Born: July 29, 1933; Lynn, Massachusetts, U.S.
- Died: March 23, 2014 (aged 80); Washington, D.C., U.S.
- Education: University of Pennsylvania; Columbia University Graduate School of Journalism
- Spouse: Linda Levitt
- Children: 4

John M. Goshko (July 29, 1933 – March 23, 2014) was an American journalist for The Washington Post.

== Early life ==
Goshko was born on July 29, 1933, in Lynn, Massachusetts. He graduated from the University of Pennsylvania, where he earned a bachelor's degree in English in 1955. He served in the United States Army for three years and attended the Columbia University Graduate School of Journalism, where he earned a master's degree in 1959.

== Career ==
Goshko began his career in journalism in Minneapolis, Minnesota, where he worked for the Star Tribune. In 1961, he joined The Washington Post. He became their correspondent in Lima, Peru in 1965. By 1967, he was their correspondent in Bolivia. He returned to Washington, D.C. in 1975, and he retired in 2000.

Goshko won the Ed Stout Award for best article or report on Latin America from the Overseas Press Club in 1970. He also won the Maria Moors Cabot Prize the same year.

== Personal life and death ==
Goshko married Linda Levitt. They had four children.

Goshko died on March 23, 2014, in Washington, D.C.
