= María Teresa Ronderos =

Colombian journalist (born 1959)

María Teresa Ronderos Torres
- Born: 1959 (age 66–67); Bogotá, Colombia
- Education: Syracuse University
- Occupation: Journalist
- Known for: Semana

María Teresa Ronderos is a Colombian journalist best known for her work on the magazine, "Semana".

== Early life and education ==
Ronderos, a native of Bogotá, studied political science at Florida International University and received a master's degree in political science from Syracuse University.

== Career ==
Ronderos began her career in Buenos Aires in 1983, where she covered Argentina's transition to democracy.

In 1992, she became the first female political editor of the Colombian newspaper El Tiempo. She worked on the TV news program Buenos Días Colombia and the TV opinion program Testimonio, and was a columnist for El Espectador, a Colombian national newspaper. From 1997 to 1999, she was editorial director, columnist, and editor at the business and financial magazine La Nota Económica.

From 2000 to 2005 she was general editor of Semana, a Colombian newsmagazine. From 1999 to 2000 she carried out a joint investigation with British and American reporters about the involvement of tobacco companies in cigarette smuggling. She was Semana’s managing editor from 2000-2005, and between 2008 and 2009 was editor of the magazine's website Semana.com.

Since 2008, Ronderos has been editorial director of VerdadAbierta.com, a website that she founded and that is focused on the armed conflict in Colombia. In 2013, Ronderos and the VerdadAbierta organization won the Simon Bolivar National Award for best investigative reporting in Colombia. In 2015, she became the director for the Open Society Program on Independent Journalism. She also serves on the board of directors for the Garcia Marquez Iberoamerican Foundation and the Colombia School of Journalism Cabot Awards. Prior to taking the director position with Open Society Foundations, she served on the boards of the Committee to Protect Journalists, and Flip, Colombia's Foundation for Freedom of the Press.

=== Journalism ===
Americas Quarterly published her essay Develop a New Hemispheric Vision as part of a Fall 2008 issue consisting of advice for the next president of the U.S. “It will make a huge difference,” she wrote, “if the U.S. government becomes less tolerant of corrupt leaders and values more transparent and open information.”

In May 2012 she published a report, La soledad de El Diario de Juárez (The Solitude of El Diario of Juarez) about the perils faced by local journalists in Ciudad Juarez, Mexico.

In November 2016, Ronderos published an article for Global Investigative Journalism Network discussing advice on investigative journalism techniques.

=== Books ===
Ronderos's book Punch: una experiencia en televisión was published by Plaza & Janés in 1991, and reprinted by the University of California in 2007.

The year 2002 saw the publication of her book Retratos del poder: vidas extremas en la Colombia contemporánea (Portraits of Power: Extreme Lives in Contemporary Colombia) and of Cómo hacer periodismo (How to Do Journalism), co-written with Juanita León and Mauricio Saenz.

She is the coauthor of the 2003 book The Water Barons. She also wrote 5 en Humor (Five profiles of Colombian political humorists)published by Aguilar (2007).

=== Other professional activities ===
Ronderos created a multimedia project for UNICEF about conditions for infants in Latin America, and also directed the documentaries El juego del poder (The Game of Power) and Un medio para el ambiente (A Medium for the Environment).

At the first International Women's Congress in Mexico City, on March 11, 2011, she spoke on “La experiencia intelectual de las mujeres en el siglo XXI” (The intellectual experience of women in the 21st Century).

In 2016, Ronderos chaired the 17th International Symposium on Online Journalism (IOSJ) "featuring six journalists from around the world in Austin, Texas." The six journalists on the panel were Trevor Snapp, Galina Timchenko, Andrei Dynko, Enock Nyariki, Kelley Niknejad. The panel discussed "creative solutions for online journalism challenges around the world."
