= Marlise Simons =

Dutch-born journalist (born 1982)

- Born: Sittard, Netherlands
- Occupation: journalist
- Employer: The New York Times
- Spouse: Alan Riding
- Children: 1

Marlise Simons is a Dutch-born journalist who joined The New York Times in 1982.

She has been based in Paris since 1989, covering a range of subjects across Europe and elsewhere. Most recently she has focused on international human rights law and on trials involving war crimes and genocide at both national and international courts.

== Career ==
Simons has worked extensively as a journalist throughout Latin America, also reporting for The Washington Post. She was based in Mexico City from 1971 to 1984 and in Rio de Janeiro from 1984 to 1989.

For The New York Times, she has reported from Central and South America and the Caribbean on conflicts and political murder, torture and disappearances in Latin America. She has also reported on environmental issues in the Brazilian Amazon.

She currently works for The New York Times's Paris Bureau. In Europe her writing has covered political, social, cultural and environmental issues and in particular proceedings at international courts and tribunals in The Hague dealing with war crimes, crimes against humanity and genocide. She has reported extensively on the work of the International Criminal Tribunal for the former Yugoslavia and the International Criminal Court.

== Personal life ==
Simons was born in Sittard, The Netherlands. She is married to Alan Riding, a journalist and author, with whom she has a son, Alexander.

== Awards and nominations ==
=== Awards ===
- 1974 Latin American Studies Association award for distinguished reporting from Latin America.
- 1981 Columbia University Graduate School of Journalism Maria Moors Cabot Prize for distinguished body of work in Latin America.
- 1990 The New York Times Publisher's Award for a "compelling, stark series of reports on the environmental crisis in Eastern Europe."
- 1995 The New York Times Publisher's Award for "authoritative and haunting pieces" about the discovery of a new cave with Paleolithic art in southern France.

=== Nominations ===
- 1991 Nomination, Pulitzer Prize for Foreign Reporting, by The New York Times.

== Books ==
- Gabriel Garcia Marquez: Conversations with the author Amsterdam Meulenhoff, 1986 (paperback) ISBN 90-290-2297-3
- The Smoking Mirror: Living in Latin America Amsterdam Meulenhoff, 1987 (trade paperback) ISBN 90-290-9727-2
- The Prosecutor and the Judge Amsterdam University Press Pallas, 2009 (with H. Verrijn Stuart) (trade paperback) ISBN 978-90-8555-023-5
