= Eloy Fariña Núñez =

Paraguayan poet (1885–1929)

- Born: Eloy Fariña Núñez; June 25, 1885; Humaitá, Paraguay
- Died: January 3, 1929 (aged 43); Buenos Aires, Argentina
- Known for: Poetry, Narration, Essay, Drama and Journalism
- Notable work: El mundo de los fantoches, Canto Secular

Eloy Fariña Núñez (July 25, 1885 – Jan. 3, 1929) was a Paraguayan writer. Born in the small town of Humaitá, he moved to neighboring Argentina as a boy and lived there until his death at 43. His works, such as the poem Canto Secular, often deal with Paraguayan themes and he remains an important figure in early 20th century Paraguayan literature.

== Early life ==
Núñez was born in Humaita, historical city of the department of Ñeembucu, in the Republic of Paraguay, on July 25, 1885, son of Felix Fariña and Buenaventura Núñez. When he was only eight years old, he moved to the province of Corrientes, Argentina, where he received his first education. Afterwards, he moved to Paraná. In that city he started his studies in the seminar, acquiring solid knowledge of classic culture, music and languages such as Latin, Greek, Portuguese, French and Italian. Without concluding his studies, he left to Buenos Aires, Argentina, where he pursued the Law career, which he had to abandon later because of economical reasons.

== Trajectory ==
He worked in public affairs. And it is from this time that come a famous anecdote that has him as protagonist. Given his natural talent and dedication to his job, he was offered the general administration of taxes position, with only one condition: to adopt the Argentine nationality. The poet's answer to this was: “Excellence... I have two mothers: one, poor but deserving, to which I owe my birth, this is Paraguay; and the other, rich and generous, Argentina, where I have formed myself and established my home. Allow me to be consequent with both”. Finally, his principles and honesty grant him the position in spite the nationality issue.

In the presentation of his “Poesias completas y otros textos” (“Complete poetry and other texts”), the Publisher El Lector signals that Fariña Núñez: “…is, without a doubt, the most prepared creative intellectual of his generation. His work has been an essential contribution to the Paraguayan modernism, in addition to provide some valuables testimonials of moral exaltation. In spite of not living in the country the most part of his life,… he never stop acknowledging the reality and problematic of his nation. An alert and preoccupied consciousness for the disturbing signals of his time,… he made efforts to interpret them with appropriateness and intellectual honesty”. In addition, in the “introduction” of the referred book, the consecrated Paraguayan intellectual Francisco Pérez-Maricevich describes Núñez as: “… the poet of our literature deserving of universal recognition” and adding later that his life: “…is one of the most intense and of more moral high of Paraguayan lives. It is also, one of the most profiler and exemplar, because the nobleness of spirit and firm sincerity of his lines” Is, in fact, the most remembered of Paraguayan poets in foreign anthologies.

== Last years ==
Married with an Argentine lady, Laura Fernández de la Puente, young still and in creative activity, he died in Buenos Aires on January 3, 1929.

== Work ==
His abundant work includes:

- “El mundo de los fantoches” (World of puppets)
- “Centenario Paraguayo” (Paraguayan Centenary)
- “Canto Secular” (Centennial Song). Published in 1911, as a homage to the centenary of the Paraguayan Independency, one of the most extent poems in all the literature of his country, with which he tried to reaffirm the spiritual values of a nation that was being reborn from the catastrophe, exalting in his verses the most elevated ideals and condemning the errors and horrors of the inhuman battles
- “Al margen del casco paraguayo” (Outside the Paraguayan helmet)
- “Bucles de Oro” (Locks of gold). A story that, in 1913, obtained the first prize in a contest patronized by the Journal “La Prensa” of Buenos Aires, which signified, in the moment, the consecration of his literary work)
- “Rhodopphis”
- “Las vertebras de pan” (The vertebra of bread)
- “El significado de la obra de Rubén Darío” (Significance of Rubén Darío's work)
- “Conceptos estéticos” (Esthetic concepts)
- “El estanco del tabaco” (Tobacco monopoly) or tobaccolist's shop

The book of poems:

- “Curupi”
- “El jardín del silencio” (Garden of silence)
- “Cármenes”
- “Mitos guaraníes” (Guarani myths)

== Sources ==
- Centro Cultural de la República El Cabildo (Cultural Center El Cabildo)
- Diccionario Biográfico “FORJADORES DEL PARAGUAY”, Primera Edición, Enero 2000 (Biographic Dictionary “Forjadores del Paraguay”, First Edition, January 2000)
- Distribuidora Quevedo de Ediciones. Buenos Aires, Argentina (Quevedo Distributor of Editions. Buenos Aires, Argentina)
