= Julia Preston =

American journalist (born 1951)

Julia Preston (born May 29, 1951) is an American journalist and contributing writer for The Marshall Project, focusing on immigration. Preston was a foreign and national correspondent and an editor for The New York Times for 21 years, from 1995 through 2016. She was a member of the New York Times team, of four reporters and an editor, that won the Pulitzer Prize for International Reporting in 1998, "for its revealing series that profiled the corrosive effects of drug corruption in Mexico." She is the co-author, with Samuel Dillon, of Opening Mexico: The Making of a Democracy, "a sweeping account of a nation's struggle for democracy." It tells the story "of the citizens' movement that ended seven decades of harsh and kleptocratic one-party rule" in Mexico.

== Early life and education ==
Preston was born in Lake Forest, Illinois. In 1980, a residence in Lake Forest that had been the home of Preston's grandmother, Margaret Atwater Preston, and later of her father, Henry Atwater Preston, was transferred by her father to the Ragdale Foundation to complete the grounds for the Ragdale artists' community, a non-profit retreat for artists, musicians and writers, "one of the largest interdisciplinary artists' communities in the country."

Preston matriculated in the first class of freshman women admitted to Yale University, entering in the fall of 1969. She took several years off, graduating from Yale with a B.A. in 1976, though she is still identified with the class of 1973.

== Career ==
From 1980 to 1990, Preston was a correspondent covering armed conflicts in Central America, including the civil war in El Salvador and the contra insurgency, backed by the United States, against the Sandinista government in Nicaragua. She reported on Central America for The Boston Globe from 1983 to 1985 and for The Washington Post from 1985 to 1990.

Preston was awarded the 1997 Maria Moors Cabot prize for distinguished coverage of Latin America. She was a winner, along with four other Washington Post reporters, of the 1994 Robert F. Kennedy journalism award for international reporting. The award was for "Third World, Second Class," a series that chronicled the daily burdens of poverty, sickness and exploitation faced by women in developing countries.

After ten years as the national immigration correspondent for The New York Times, Preston joined The Marshall Project, a nonprofit news organization that covers the U.S. criminal justice system. Her first story, published two weeks after the inauguration of President Donald Trump, noted "the administration was laying the groundwork for a vast expansion of the nation's deportation system." Preston's work for The Marshall Project has included two collaborations with the radio program This American Life.

== Personal life ==
Preston was married to Sam Dillon, then also a journalist, in 1987. They divorced in 2005. They have one daughter.
