= Alister Hughes =

Alister Earl Hewitson Hughes (21 January 1919 – 28 February 2005) was a Grenadian journalist and poet.

He was born on 21 January 1919 in St. Georges, Grenada, and died on 28 February 2005. He was the Editor of the Grenada Newsletter from 1972 to 1994.
