= Vordemwald =

- Municipality
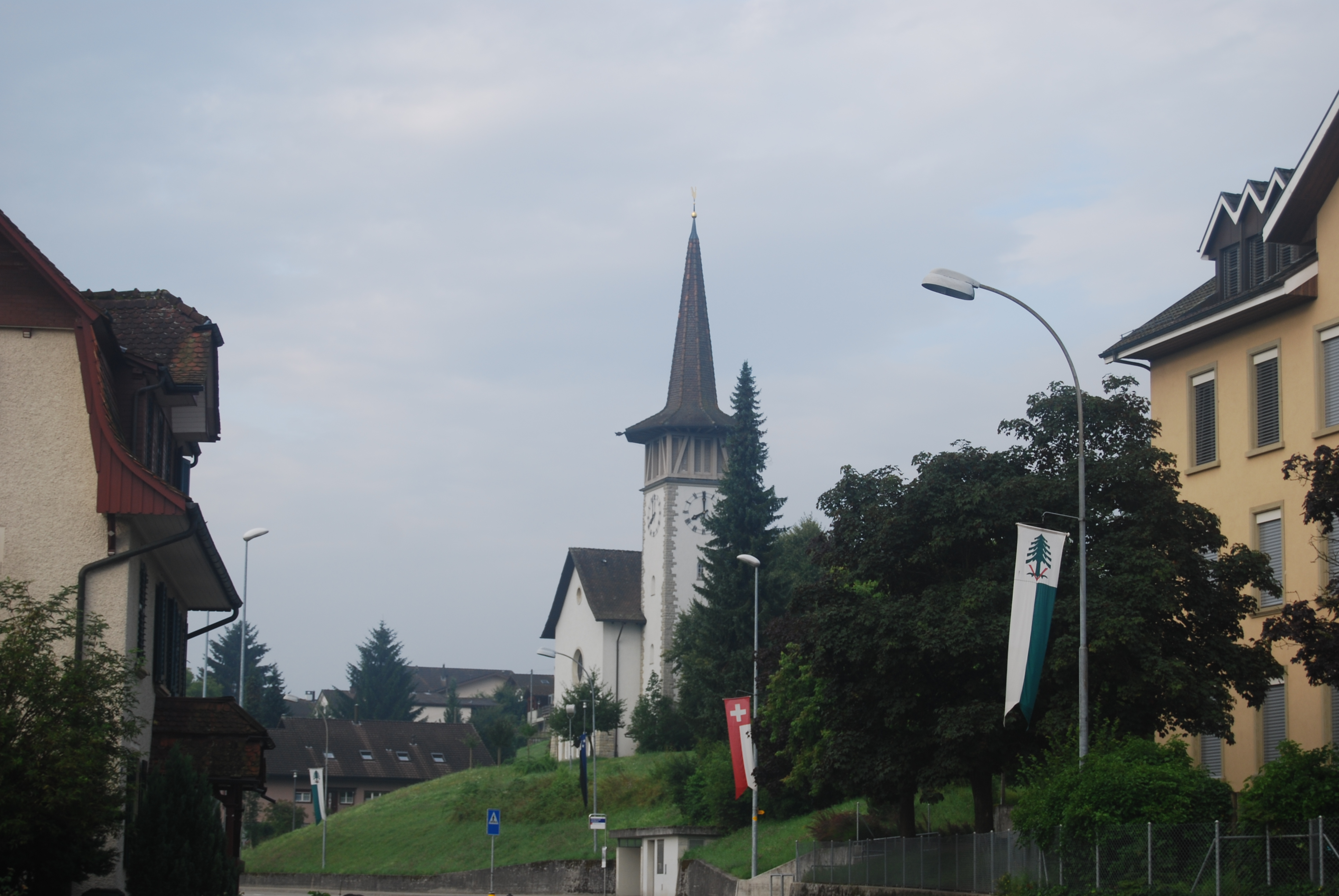

- Flag Coat of arms
- Location of Vordemwald
- Location within Switzerland Location within Canton of Aargau
- Coordinates: 47°17′N 7°54′E
- Country: Switzerland
- Canton: Aargau
- District: Zofingen

Area
  - Total: 10.13 km^{2} (3.91 sq mi)
- Elevation: 430 m (1,410 ft)

Population (December 2006)
  - Total: 1,720
  - Density: 170/km^{2} (440/sq mi)
- Time zone: UTC+01:00 (CET)
  - Summer (DST): UTC+02:00 (CEST)
- Postal code: 4803
- SFOS number: 4287
- ISO 3166 code: CH-AG
- Surrounded by: Brittnau, Murgenthal, Rothrist, Strengelbach
- Website: www.vordemwald.ch

Vordemwald is a municipality in the district of Zofingen in the canton of Aargau in Switzerland.

== Geography ==
Vordemwald has an area, as of 2009, of 10.13 square kilometers (3.91 sq mi). Of this area, 3.52 km^{2} (1.36 sq mi) or 34.7% is used for agricultural purposes, while 5.88 km^{2} (2.27 sq mi) or 58.0% is forested. Of the rest of the land, 0.73 km^{2} (0.28 sq mi) or 7.2% is settled (buildings or roads), 0.02 km^{2} (4.9 acres) or 0.2% is either rivers or lakes.

Of the built up area, housing and buildings made up 3.8% and transportation infrastructure made up 2.2%. Out of the forested land, 56.7% of the total land area is heavily forested and 1.4% is covered with orchards or small clusters of trees. Of the agricultural land, 23.5% is used for growing crops and 10.3% is pastures. All the water in the municipality is flowing water.

== Coat of arms ==
The blazon of the municipal coat of arms is Argent a Pine Tree eradicated Vert ensigned in base with a letter V Gules. This is an example of canting with the letter V placed before the pine-tree (German: Vor dem Wald meaning "before the forest")

== Demographics ==
Vordemwald has a population (as of December 2020) of 1,992. As of June 2009, 3.3% of the population are foreign nationals. Over the last 10 years (1997–2007) the population has changed at a rate of 0.7%. Most of the population (as of 2000) speaks German (96.1%), with Italian being second most common ( 1.4%) and Serbo-Croatian being third ( 0.4%).

The age distribution, as of 2008, in Vordemwald is; 152 children or 8.8% of the population are between 0 and 9 years old and 216 teenagers or 12.5% are between 10 and 19. Of the adult population, 158 people or 9.2% of the population are between 20 and 29 years old. 194 people or 11.3% are between 30 and 39, 292 people or 16.9% are between 40 and 49, and 248 people or 14.4% are between 50 and 59. The senior population distribution is 257 people or 14.9% of the population are between 60 and 69 years old, 116 people or 6.7% are between 70 and 79, there are 76 people or 4.4% who are between 80 and 89, and there are 14 people or 0.8% who are 90 and older.

As of 2000, there were 37 homes with 1 or 2 persons in the household, 342 homes with 3 or 4 persons in the household, and 287 homes with 5 or more persons in the household. As of 2000, there were 695 private households (homes and apartments) in the municipality, and an average of 2.5 persons per household. In 2008 there were 362 single family homes (or 46.6% of the total) out of a total of 776 homes and apartments. There were a total of 10 empty apartments for a 1.3% vacancy rate. As of 2007, the construction rate of new housing units was 1.7 new units per 1000 residents.

In the 2007 federal election the most popular party was the SVP which received 37.17% of the vote. The next three most popular parties were the SP (20.9%), the FDP (11.07%) and the Green Party (7.94%). In the federal election, a total of 653 votes were cast, and the voter turnout was 48.8%.

The historical population is given in the following table:

Historical population
Year	Pop.	±%
1975	1,459	—
1980	1,503	+3.0%
1990	1,607	+6.9%
2000	1,788	+11.3%

== Economy ==
As of 2007, Vordemwald had an unemployment rate of 1.49%. As of 2005, there were 69 people employed in the primary economic sector and about 31 businesses involved in this sector. 138 people are employed in the secondary sector and there are 20 businesses in this sector. 295 people are employed in the tertiary sector, with 34 businesses in this sector.

In 2000 there were 915 workers who lived in the municipality. Of these, 717 or about 78.4% of the residents worked outside Vordemwald while 213 people commuted into the municipality for work. There were a total of 411 jobs (of at least 6 hours per week) in the municipality. Of the working population, 11.3% used public transportation to get to work, and 55.2% used a private car.

== Religion ==
From the 2000 census, 335 or 18.7% were Roman Catholic, while 1,256 or 70.2% belonged to the Swiss Reformed Church. Of the rest of the population, there was 1 individual who belonged to the Christian Catholic faith.

== Education ==
The entire Swiss population is generally well educated. In Vordemwald about 77.2% of the population (between age 25–64) have completed either non-mandatory upper secondary education or additional higher education (either university or a Fachhochschule). Of the school age population (in the 2008/2009 school year), there are 119 students attending primary school, there are 71 students attending secondary school in the municipality.
