= List of executive search firms =

Executive search (informally often referred to as headhunting) is a specialized recruitment service which organizations pay to seek out and recruit highly qualified candidates for senior-level and executive jobs.

A 2022 industry newsletter ranking of the largest executive search firms in the Americas listed estimated revenues of 50 firms, with top five being: Korn Ferry, Russell Reynolds Associates, Spencer Stuart, Heidrick & Struggles, and Egon Zehnder. Each of them had more than U.S. $450 million in estimated revenues, and more than 300 consultants.

Forbes partnered with market research company Statista to determine an annual ranking of America’s best executive recruiting firms—the top 150 executive search firms specialized in filling positions with salaries of at least $100,000.

Notable executive search firms include:

- Allegis Group
- Challenger, Gray & Christmas
- Egon Zehnder
- Stanton Chase
- Korn Ferry
- PageGroup
- Rosenzweig & Company
- Russell Reynolds Associates
- Spencer Stuart
- Transearch International
- Whitehead Mann
- Oppiatec Consulting
