= List of newspapers in Chile =

This is a list of newspapers in Chile.

== Print newspapers ==
=== Daily circulation ===
==== National circulation ====
Newspaper	City	Founded	Publisher	Notes
El Mercurio	Santiago	1 June 1900	El Mercurio S.A.P.	Conservative morning daily; considered the country's paper of record
La Tercera	Santiago	7 July 1950	Copesa	Conservative morning daily; El Mercurio's closest competitor
Diario Financiero	Santiago	25 October 1988	Grupo Claro	Conservative; EyN of El Mercurio and Pulso's closest competitor
La Segunda	Santiago	29 July 1931	El Mercurio S.A.P.	Conservative afternoon daily
Las Últimas Noticias	Santiago	15 November 1902	El Mercurio S.A.P.	Tabloid

- Publimetro
- The Clinic – Left-wing Satirical weekly

==== Regional circulation ====
Valparaíso Region

- El Mercurio de Valparaíso (Valparaíso)

O'Higgins Region

- El Rancagüino (Rancagua)

Maule Region

- La Prensa (Curicó)
- El Deportero

Biobío Region

- El Sur (Concepción)
- Diario Concepción

Araucanía Region

- Las Noticias (Victoria)

Los Ríos Region

- El Diario Austral de Los Ríos (Valdivia)

Aysén Region

- El Divisadero (Coihaique)
- El Diario de Aysén

Magallanes Region

- La Prensa Austral (Punta Arenas)
- El Pingüino

Los Lagos Region

- El Llanquihue (Puerto Montt)

Coquimbo Region

- El Día (La Serena)

Antofagasta Region

- La Estrella (Antofagasta)
- El Mercurio de Antofagasta

Arica y Parinacota Region

- La Estrella de Arica (Arica)

Tarapacá Region

- La Estrella de Iquique (Iquique)
- El Longino

Araucanía Region

- El Austral (Temuco)

=== Non-daily newspapers ===
==== National circulation ====
- Cambio 21

==== Regional circulation ====
O'Higgins Region

- El Faro del Secano (Pichilemu)
- La Voz de la Región (Pichilemu)

Valparaíso Region

- Te Rapa Nui (Easter Island)
- moeVarua Rapa Nui (Easter Island)

== Non-Spanish written newspapers ==
- Cóndor (in German; weekly printed)
- The Santiago Times (in English; daily and online)

== Online newspapers ==
O'Higgins Region

- El Expreso de la Costa (Pichilemu)
- El Marino (Pichilemu)

Los Ríos Region

- El Naveghable

Valparaíso Region

- El Correo del Moai (Easter Island)

== Defunct newspapers ==
- Aurora de Chile – first daily of Chile
- Pichilemu (Pichilemu)
- Valdivia's Deutsche Zeitung

== See also ==
- List of Chilean magazines
- Television in Chile
