= María Edwards =

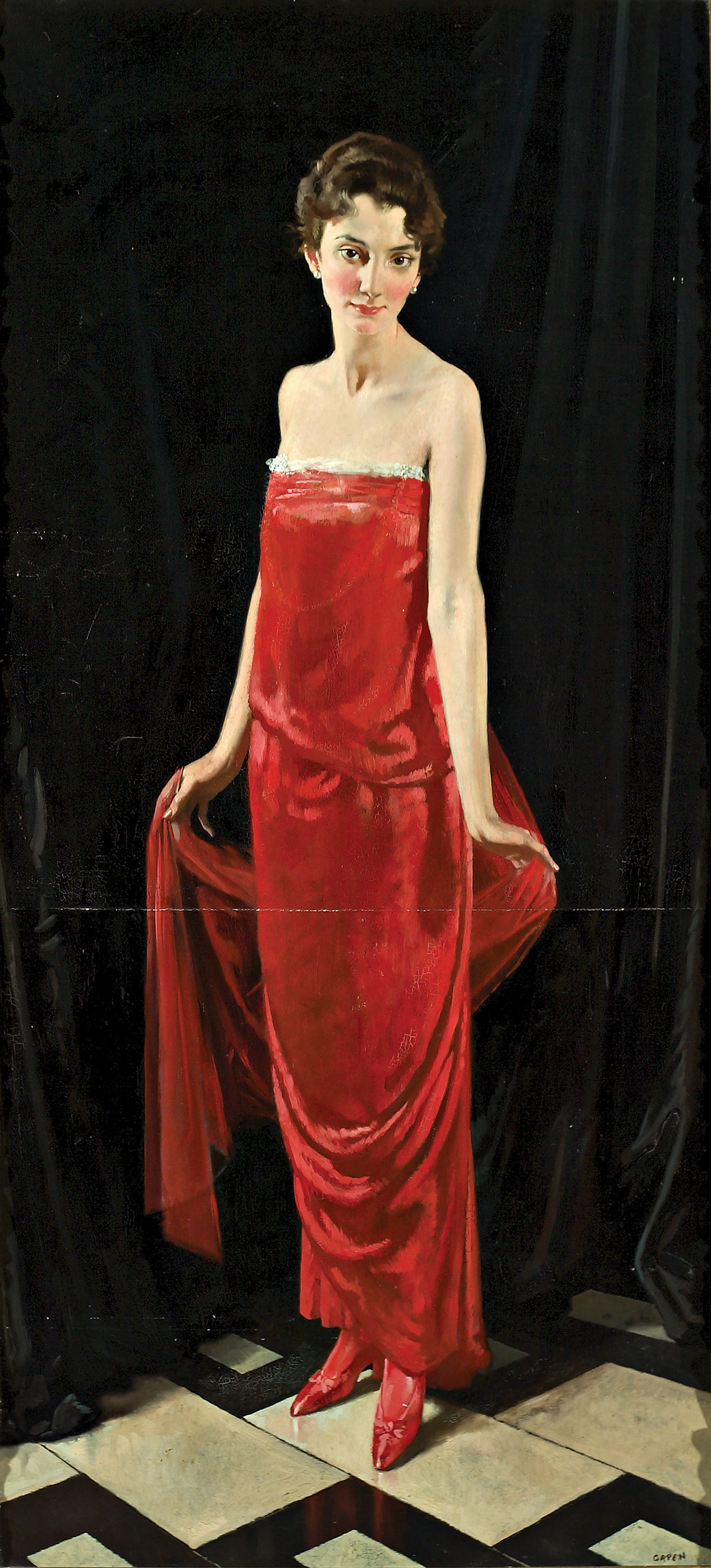
- "Madame Errázuriz" (1915) Sir William Orpen
- Born: María Edwards McClure; 11 December 1893; Santiago, Chile
- Died: 8 June 1972 (aged 78); Santiago, Chile
- Occupations: Social worker; nurse; French Resistance member
- Known for: Co-founder of the Hôpital Rothschild resistance network
- Spouses: Guillermo Errázuriz (m. 1913; died 1922) Jacques Feydeau (div. 1926)
- Children: 1
- Parents: Agustín Edwards Ross (father); María Luisa McClure Ossandón (mother)
- Relatives: Agustín Edwards Mac-Clure (brother); Alberto Edwards (cousin); Agustín Edwards Ossandón (grandfather); Juana Ross Edwards (grandmother); Georges Feydeau (ex-father-in-law)
- Family: Edwards family (by birth); Vergara family (by marriage)
- Awards: Legion d'Honneur (1953); Righteous Among The Nations (2005)

María Edwards McClure de Errázuriz (11 December 1893 – 8 June 1972), known as María Edwards and Marie Errázuriz, was a Chilean social worker, nurse and member of the French Resistance. She is known for co-founding the Hôpital Rothschild resistance network which saved the lives of Jewish children in Nazi occupied Paris.

== Early life ==
María Edwards McClure was born on 11 December 1893 in Santiago, to María Luisa McClure Ossandón and Agustín Edwards Ross, a politician, businessperson and member of the Edwards family. Edwards was the youngest of nine children, and was raised in a devoutly Catholic family. Edwards was the granddaughter of Juana Ross Edwards, a philanthropist, and Agustín Edwards Ossandón, a businessperson, mining entrepreneur, banker and politician.

In 1913, Edwards married Guillermo Errázuriz Vergara, a diplomat and member of the Vergara family.

== Paris ==
Guillermo's work took the couple to England, where in 1917 their daughter María Angélica Errázuriz (1917–1965) was born. The family were later posted to Paris.

In 1922, Guillermo committed suicide. In 1926, Edwards married Jacques Feydeau, a French writer and son of Georges Feydeau. Edwards and Feydeau divorced soon afterwards.

During the German occupation of Paris, she worked as a volunteer nurse at the Hôpital Rothschild. While working there, she joined the French Resistance, and helped, many times by risking her own life, rescue Jewish children who had been separated from their parents and were slated to be sent to their death in concentration camps . She was arrested, interrogated and tortured several times by the Gestapo, but was able to escape death thanks to her background and diplomatic connections.

== Legacy ==
On 2 September 1953, Edwards was awarded the Legion d'Honneur for bravery in France.

In 2005, Edwards was posthumously awarded Righteous Among The Nations for her work saving Jewish children.

In 2017, Parvis Claire-Heyman-et-Maria-Errazuriz Square in Paris was named in honour of Edwards and Claire Heyman.

== Personal life ==
In 1960, Edwards permanently returned to Chile to retire from public life. On 8 June 1972, Edwards died in Santiago aged 78.
