= Agustín Edwards Eastman =

Chilean newspaper publisher (1927-2017)

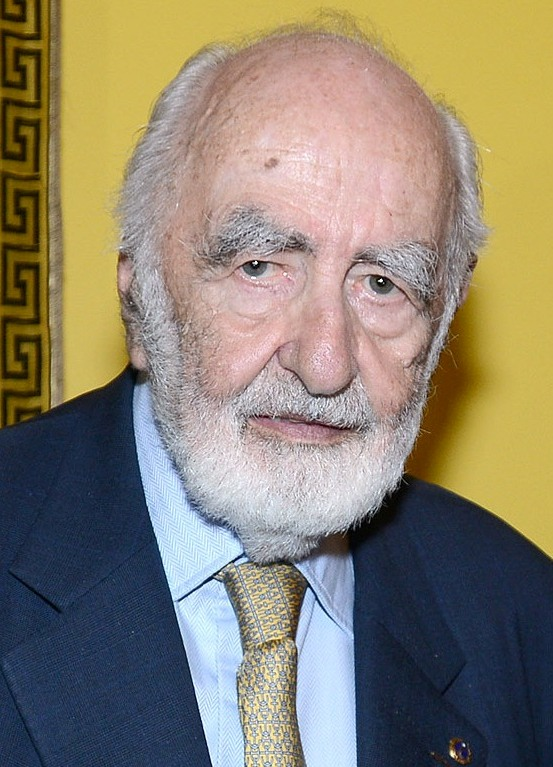
- Edwards in 2014
- Born: Agustín Iván Edmundo Edwards Eastman; 24 November 1927; Paris, France
- Died: 24 April 2017 (aged 89); Graneros, Chile
- Education: Princeton University; University of Chile
- Occupations: Media proprietor; journalist
- Organization: El Mercurio SAP
- Father: Agustín Edwards Budge
- Relatives: Agustín Edwards Mac-Clure (grandfather); Roberto Edwards Eastman (brother)
- Family: Edwards family

Agustín Iván Edmundo Edwards Eastman (24 November 1927 – 24 April 2017) was a Chilean media proprietor, journalist and owner of El Mercurio SAP. Edwards inherited the family's newspaper company El Mercurio SAP, which publishes Chile's leading national dailies El Mercurio and La Segunda among others. Known for his right-wing views, Edwards used El Mercurio SAP's newspapers to influence public opinion in Chile and supported the 1973 coup d'état to oust socialist President Salvador Allende.

== Early life and education ==
He was born in Paris, France in 1927, the son of Agustín Edwards Budge, grandson of Agustin Edwards Mac-Clure of the Edwards family, and Mary Elizabeth Eastman Beeche. Edwards was educated at Heatherdown School, London and graduated from The Grange School in Santiago. He studied international relations at Princeton University, graduating in 1949 cum laude, and then studied law at the University of Chile.

== Journalism career and family business ==
Edwards worked as a reporter for the International Herald Tribune in Paris and for The Times in London, after which he returned to Chile to join El Mercurio SAP, where he worked in the international section before becoming an assistant editor. Soon after, Edwards, also became involved in several of the family's companies, including one of the oldest banks in Chile, Banco A. Edwards, founded in 1867 by his great-great grandfather Agustin Edwards Ossandon, the wealthiest man in Chile and founder of dozens of successful businesses.

== Publisher ==
In 1968, Edwards was elected president of the Inter-American Press Association. He founded the association's committee on press freedom, and commissions on technical issues and scholarships. He also is president of the Diarios America Group, another trade organization.

On 15 September 1970, Edwards met with Henry Kissinger, John N. Mitchell and Richard Helms in Washington to request their financial support in his attempt to oust Socialist Salvador Allende who was about to win the Presidency. Documents recently declassified by the National Security Archive provide further details about this meeting, the first and only known meeting between a Chilean (civilian or military) and a United States CIA Director. According to these records, during this meeting Edwards pushed for a U.S.-led, preemptive coup to block the inauguration of Allende. He also provided the CIA with intelligence crucial to planning the coup, including specifying armed forces officers and government officials who would be allies in orchestrating it. After the meeting, Edwards stayed in Washington for several days where he shared more intelligence with the CIA, and as evidence suggests, may have even met with President Nixon. Over the following year, Richard Nixon approved three covert payments totalling approximately US$2,000,000 to Edwards so he would use his media empire to help destabilise Chile's democratic process. In the days and years following the military coup of 11 September 1973, Edwards' newspapers published falsifications to justify the coup and cover up the human rights violations of General Augusto Pinochet's dictatorship. Edwards' media outlets did not just create political instability through their reporting, but also conspired with the armed forces to facilitate a successful military takeover. In 1973, a CIA official referred to the El Mercurio chain of newspapers as among "the most militant parts of the opposition."

American financial support for Edwards' newspapers continued even after the coup to assist in the Junta's consolidation of power. Only after the Rettig Report detailing the crimes of the Pinochet dictatorship was released in February 1991 did El Mercurio stop referring to victims of human rights violations as "allegedly missing prisoners".

The Chilean documentary Agustín's Newspaper (2008), which included interviews with John Dinges and several of Edwards' former and current employees, exposed serious cases of disinformation in Edwards publications from the 1960s onwards. Since the overthrow of Pinochet's military dictatorship, a number of journalists have attempted to have Edwards indicted for crimes related to his alleged breaches of journalistic ethics and documented payments from the Central Intelligence Agency. In an interview in El Mercurio in 2000, Edwards defended himself by saying "I honestly think that we always try to simply report what happened. However, there may be serious limitations that cannot be overcome by any means." In April 2015, he was expelled from the Chilean Order of Journalists (Colegio de Periodistas de Chile) for a "serious lack of ethics", due to his role in the conspiracy to overthrow Allende with the support from the United States government, and for the "staging to legitimize the torture of two young men during the visit of Pope John Paul II" in 1987 during Pinochet's dictatorship.

== Personal life ==
Edwards was married to María Luisa del Río Fernández, and they have six children: Agustín, Isabel, Carolina, Cristián, André, and Felipe. One of his sisters, Sonia, was a supporter of Allende and the Revolutionary Left Movement, and they never fully reconciled before her death in 2003.

Edwards was a lifelong dedicated yachtsman, having owned many yachts during his lifetime, and known for having built one of the most celebrated "superyachts", named Anakena.

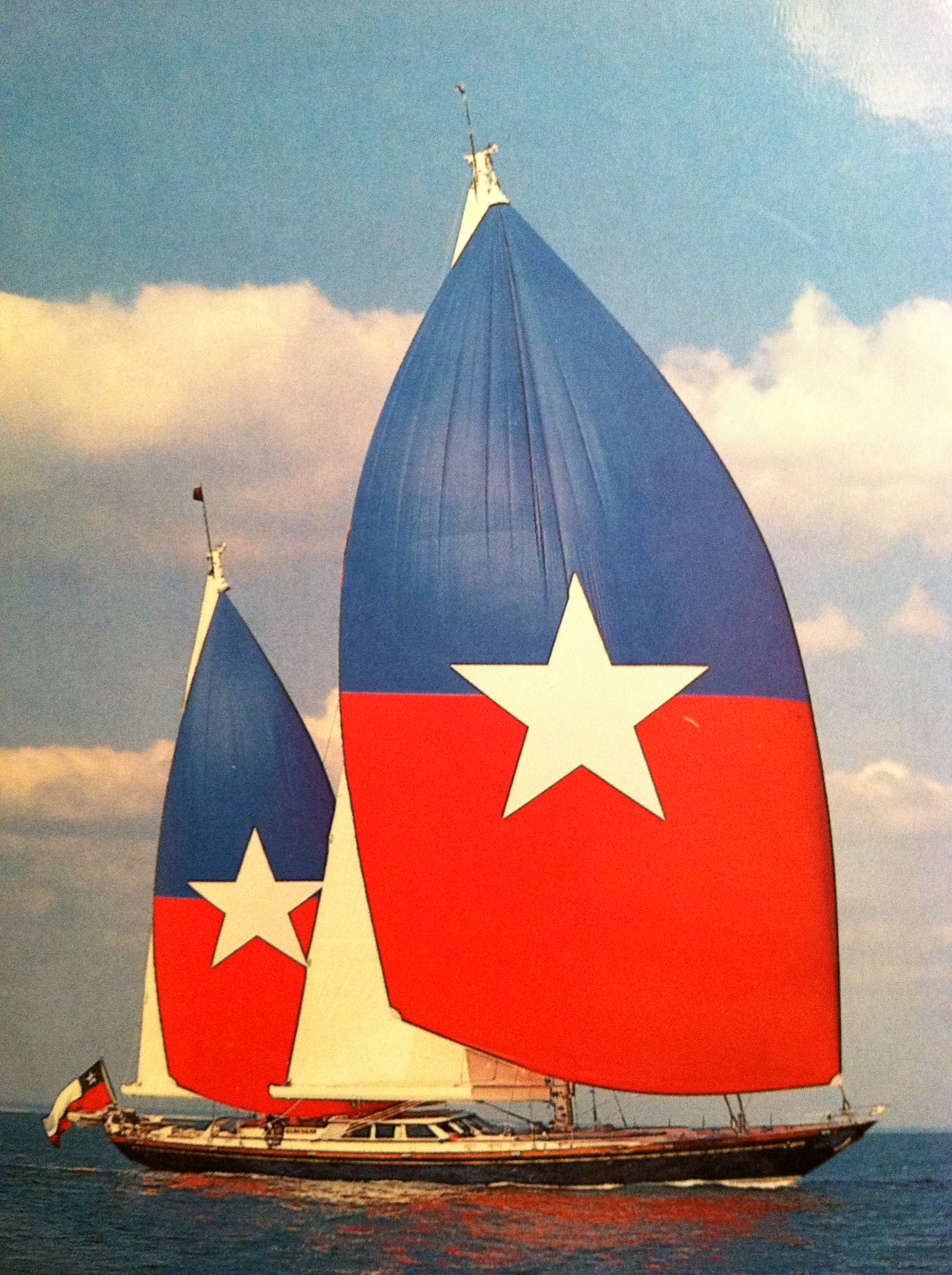
Anakena Superyacht, Built in 1994 at Royal Huisman shipyard.

Agustin Edwards' passion for landscaping and gardens, has been brought to life not only in the two private islands he owned (one in the south of Chile and another in Maine), but also through his collaboration with famed landscape architect, Russell Page.

== Philanthropy ==
Edwards has been active in philanthropic and civil society organizations in Chile throughout his career as publisher. He founded the Paz Ciudadana Foundation, a civil society organization that fights against drugs and violent crime. Among other organizations he was part of are Hogar de Cristo, an anti-poverty non-profit for which he was an advisor, and the Claudio Gay Foundation, which educates the public about Chile's native flora, of which he was president, and the País Digital Foundation. Through his lifelong friendship with David Rockefeller Sr., which began through his grandfather Agustin Edwards Mac-Clure, Edwards has been a longtime supporter and member of both of Rockefeller's Latin American initiatives in the United States: The Americas Society and the David Rockefeller Center for Latin American Studies (DRCLAS) at Harvard University. He has also been a supporter of museums both in Chile and in the US, including the Museum of Modern Art (MoMA).
