= Amrop Partnership =

Global partnership of executive search firms

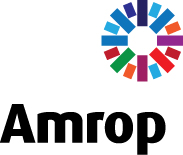
- Founded: 1977
- Headquarters: Brussels, Belgium
- Key people: Annika Farin
- Products: Executive search
- Website: https://www.amrop.com/

Amrop Partnership is a Belgium-based global partnership of executive search firms. The largest executive search firm in Europe and a top-10 globally with 72 offices in 59 countries of 2026, Amrop was founded in 1977.

== History ==
Amrop was founded in 1977 as a network of four retained executive search firms in France, Italy, the UK, and the US. This network was called Amrop International.

In Canada, Amrop is known as Amrop Rosin, and it is one of Canada's leading senior executive search firms.

In 1997, Mülder & Partner was acquired by Heidrick & Struggles and exited the network, while the American and Italian members, Lamalie Amrop and TMC Amrop, were later taken over by TMP Associates and also departed. Amrop International attempted to fill the gaps in the German market in 1999 by including Hofmann Herbold & Partner in its network. Shortly afterward, Korn Ferry bought the new German associate, Amrop Hofmann Herbold.

In June 2000, Amrop acquired Delta Management GmbH, a Düsseldorf-based firm and a founding partner of the Hever Group since 1986. This merger led to the creation of what was claimed to be the largest international organization of independent personnel consulting firms at the time. Operating as "The Amrop Hever Group," it spanned 52 countries with 81 offices.

In 2003, Delta Management achieved 12 million euro in sales in Germany, becoming the largest company within Amrop Hever group.

In 2004–2005, Battalia Winston joined Amrop as its US member.

In 2005, Amrop Hever had more offices worldwide than any other search firm.

In 2008, NewsWeek included four Amrop's executives in the list the Most Influential Headhunters.

In 2009, the name was changed to Amrop.

In 2011, Amrop forged a partnership with the Swiss business school International Institute for Management Development (IMD) and launched its Trusted Advisor Program under the umbrella of Amrop University.

In 2014, Amrop and the International Institute for Management Development (IMD) published a global C-suite study: 'Welcome to the Flight Deck' — exploring the human dimension of globalizing mid-caps. In the same year, Amrop was named among the 20 leading global executive search firms.

Since 2015, Amrop has increased its presence in EMEA and relaunched its global Leadership Advisory and Board Services practices.

In 2017, Amrop strengthened its global footprint across EMEA and Asia Pacific.

Amrop also released a report titled 'Wise Decision-Making: Stepping Up to Sustainable Performance'.

In 2021, Amrop Partnership and JM Search (an independent retained search and leadership advisory firm) announced a strategic alliance to expand global client reach. While in Peru, the local firm consolidated the market share to 40% according to the analysis of El Comercio.

As Diario Financiero reported, in 2022 the Chilean Pension Fund (AFP) selected Max Vicuña's Amrop headhunting firm to oversee the election of company directors, entrusting Amrop with the task of identifying candidates to represent administrators on the boards of companies in which AFP invests.

In October, Amrop opened a new office in Madrid, Spain. In 2024, the company announced the opening of a new office in Santo Domingo, Dominican Republic, in Dubai, United Arab Emirates. In 2025, Amrop Rosin merged with Humanis Calgary, creating a new cross-Canada executive search firm.

At the same year, the company opened offices in Japan, Colombia and Poland. In 2026, Amrop expanded Asia Pacific presence with offices in Singapore and Malaysia and in the Baltics with office in Lithuania.
