= FICCO =

Festival Internacional de Cine Contemporáneo
- Location: Mexico City
- Founded: 2004
- Hosted by: Cinemax

Mexico City International Contemporary Film Festival, or FICCO (Festival Internacional de Cine Contemporáneo) for its initials in Spanish was an annual film festival founded by film producers Michel Lipkes and Paula Astorga in February 2004. The festival ran for seven years, ending in 2010 and reopened in 2014 for Narrative only Film.

It quickly become one of the most important film festivals in Latin America. It was hosted by Cinemex, one of the two dominant movie theater chains in Mexico. It lasted two weeks and programmed sections on documentary features, fiction, worldwide premieres, retrospectives, and global tendencies in cinema. The jury was composed of important figures of the film industry worldwide.

In 2007 it programmed documentary retrospectives on Peter Watkins and Peter Whitehead, and a retrospective on Robert Bresson and Pedro Costa.

== Awards ==
=== FICCO-Cinemex Award for Best Narrative Film ===
- 2004 - The Return - Andrey Zvyagintsev
- 2005 - Turtles Can Fly - Bahman Ghobadi
- 2006 - The Death of Mr. Lazarescu - Cristi Puiu
- 2007 - 12:08 East of Bucharest - Corneliu Porumboiu
- 2008 - El cielo, la tierra y la lluvia - José Luis Torres Leiva
- 2009 - Ballast - Lance Hammer and Los paranoicos - Gabriel Medina
- 2014 - Kung Fury - David Sandberg
- 2015 - Me and My Moulton - Torill Kove
- 2016 - Seline - Prince Luciano Francesco Silighini Garagnani Lambertini di Poggio Renatico

=== FICCO-Cinemex Award for Best Documentary Film ===
- 2005 - Tie Xi Qu: West of the Tracks - Wang Bing
- 2006 - Workingman's Death - Michael Glawogger
- 2007 - Nacido sin / Born Without - Eva Norvind
- 2008 - Hunters Since the Beginning of Time - Carlos Casas
- 2009 - Tie: Waltz with Bashir - Ari Folman and Puisque nous sommes nés - Jean-Pierre Duret and Andrea Santana

=== Best Latin American Film ===
- 2006 - Paraguayan Hammock - Paz Encina

=== FICCO-Movie City Award for Best Debut Film ===
- 2009 - Cómo estar muerto/Como estar muerto - Manuel Ferrari and The Pleasure of Being Robbed - Joshua Safdie

=== Pfizer Human Rights Award ===
- 2009 -Access Road - Nathalie Mansoux

=== Exxonmobil Award for Best Female Director ===
- 2009 - $9.99 - Tatia Rosenthal

=== Best Mexican Digital Film ===
- 2009 - Calentamiento local - Fernando Frías

=== Fipresci Award for Best Mexican Documentary Film ===
- 2006 - Copacabana - Martín Rejtman
- 2009 - Nuestra lucha - Jaime Rogel

== See also ==
- Film festivals in North and Central America
