= Recaredo Santos Tornero =

- Born: October 14, 1842; Valparaíso, Chile
- Died: July 26, 1902 (aged 59); Santiago, Chile
- Occupation(s): Journalist, Editor and Director of El Mercurio de Valparaíso
- Years active: 1860–1902
- Spouse: Elena Stuven Olmos
- Children: Carmela, Recaredo, Teresa and Enrique

Recaredo Santos Tornero Olmos (October 14, 1842 – July 26, 1902) was a Chilean editor, journalist and director of El Mercurio de Valparaíso and founder of El Comercio.

== Biography ==
Tornero was born in Valparaíso, on October 14, 1842. His parents were Carmen Olmos de Aguilera Orrego, and Spanish immigrant José Santos Tornero Monteros, the proprietary of the first public library in Chile. He studied in the National Institute of Santiago, and he later went to France to study on the Ecole Superieure de Commerce de Paris. He returned to Chile in 1860, and he succeeded his father as director of El Mercurio de Valparaíso in 1866. He married Elena Stuven Olmos, and they had 4 children: Carmela, Recaredo, Teresa and Enrique.

His father's enterprises included the Spanish Library (Spanish: Librería Española), the printing house of El Mercurio and the Valparaíso newspaper of the same name. They remained in the family for 33 years. In 1866, Tornero and his brother Orestes bought the enterprise from their father.

Orestes maintained the library and its dependencies, while Recaredo continued administering the printing house and the newspaper. Later, they formed Tornero & Sons Society (Spanish: Sociedad Tornero e Hijos) with his father, who was living in outside Chile.

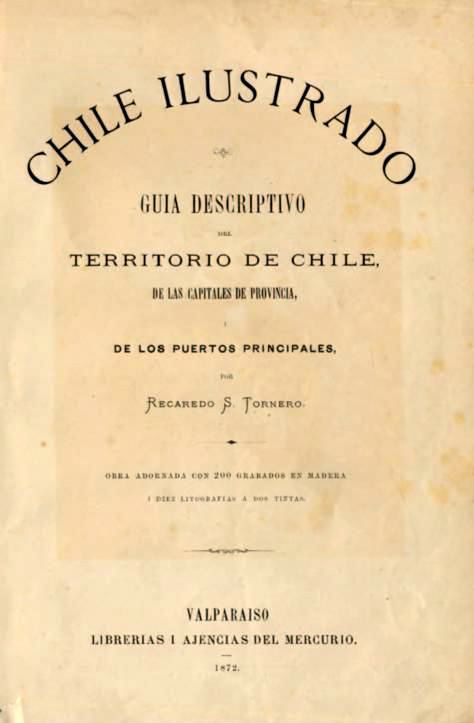
Front page of Chile Ilustrado (1872).

Since 1867, Tornero was the only editor of El Mercurio de Valparaíso until 1870, when he partnered with Camilo Letelier. Blanco Cuartín assumed as main editor of the newspaper later; who proposed a cultural and literary-scoped topic.

He published Chile Ilustrado in 1872, the first illustrated album of Chile, with a descriptive guide, historic, politic, industrial, social and statistical review of the country and a rich graphic backup, with more than 200 wood engravings and 10 lithographs. He was awarded for this book on 1876 Philadelphia Exposition.

After 9 years as director, he sold his part of the newspaper to Camilo Letelier. He revisited Europe in 1877, where he stayed until 1880. He bought machinery in Europe to create the first paper factory in Chile, after which he began publishing foreign works translated into Spanish.

After his comeback to Valparaíso, Tornero established a library and a printing house in Almendral. When his brother Orestes died in 1881, he took over Mercurio library, that was mainly focused on editing teaching books and works translated from French.

He founded El Comercio newspaper in 1890, on the eve of the 1891 Chilean Civil War, to support President José Manuel Balmaceda, who had bad relationship with the Chilean press.

He died in Santiago on July 26, 1902.
