= Ross Edwards =

Ross Edwards may refer to:

- Ross Edwards (cricketer) (born 1942), Australian cricketer
- Ross Edwards (composer) (born 1943), Australian composer
- Ross Edwards (author), pen name of Peter Robb (born 1946), Australian author

== See also ==
- John-Ross Edwards (born 1988), Jamaican former footballer
- Juana Ross Edwards (1830–1913), Chilean philanthropist
