= I Love Chile News =

Chilean national multimedia company

I Love Chile News (ILC)
- Industry: Mass media
- Predecessor: Santiago Radio
- Founded: 1 January 2007
- Founder: Daniel Brewington (CEO & Publisher)
- Headquarters: Santiago de Chile, Chile
- Key people: Paul Urmston (Partner and COO); Pamela Lagos (Partner and CBDO)
- Services: news, magazine, television, radio, online
- Revenue: 128,454.32
- Owner: Brewington y Compania Ltda
- Number of employees: 5
- Parent: Brewington y Compania Ltda
- Website: ilovechile.cl

I Love Chile (ILC) is a national multimedia company operating in Santiago de Chile. All news stories are about Chile or Chileans abroad. I Love Chile publishes all their services in English. The ILC online magazine vies with The Santiago Times being the leader of English language media in Chile. ILC provides its news for free across Chile and can be found in kiosks, hotels and at many airports throughout the nation.

== Overview ==
I Love Chile was founded in 2007 as Santiago Radio (English language station) by Daniel H. Brewington. Today, the international team is spread all over the world and consists of more than 50 freelance journalists, experts, bloggers, social media enthusiasts, designers, analysts, translators and many committed interns. As such, I Love Chile is amongst the largest English newspapers in Chile. Each month, I Love Chile receives more than 190,000 unique visits and 5 million monthly page views from visitors in over 135 countries.

The company operates under the slogan “Promoting English in Chile and Chile in English.”

I Love Chile Digital Magazine is distributed to people around the world who are interested in what is happening in and around Chile: from indigenous population to investment and everything in between. The articles cover a large variety of topics including the concerns of tourists, expats, ambassadors, businessmen, teachers and students across more than 100 communities in Chile.

== Multimedia branches ==
Over time I Love Chile expanded their news channels:

=== Monthly Print Newspaper ===
Formerly known as The Pulse, The Monthly Print was published on the 15th of every month. It includes topics like economy, politics, arts and culture, sports and others.

=== Weekly Online ===
A different type of format is used for the Weekly Online. The news are catalogued online and sent weekly to readers. The style and content of the stories differ from the Monthly Print.

=== ILC Radio ===
I Love Chile launched Santiago Radio or "ILC Radio" as an online radio station. Offering a wide range of music as well as daily news and radio shows relevant to living, visiting, or doing business in Chile.

=== ILC Television ===
The company runs an online television channel including a weekly newscast and broadcasts coverage from all around Chile.

== See also ==
- List of newspapers in Chile
