= Edwards family =

Chilean family of English descent

- Chilean political, publishing and business family
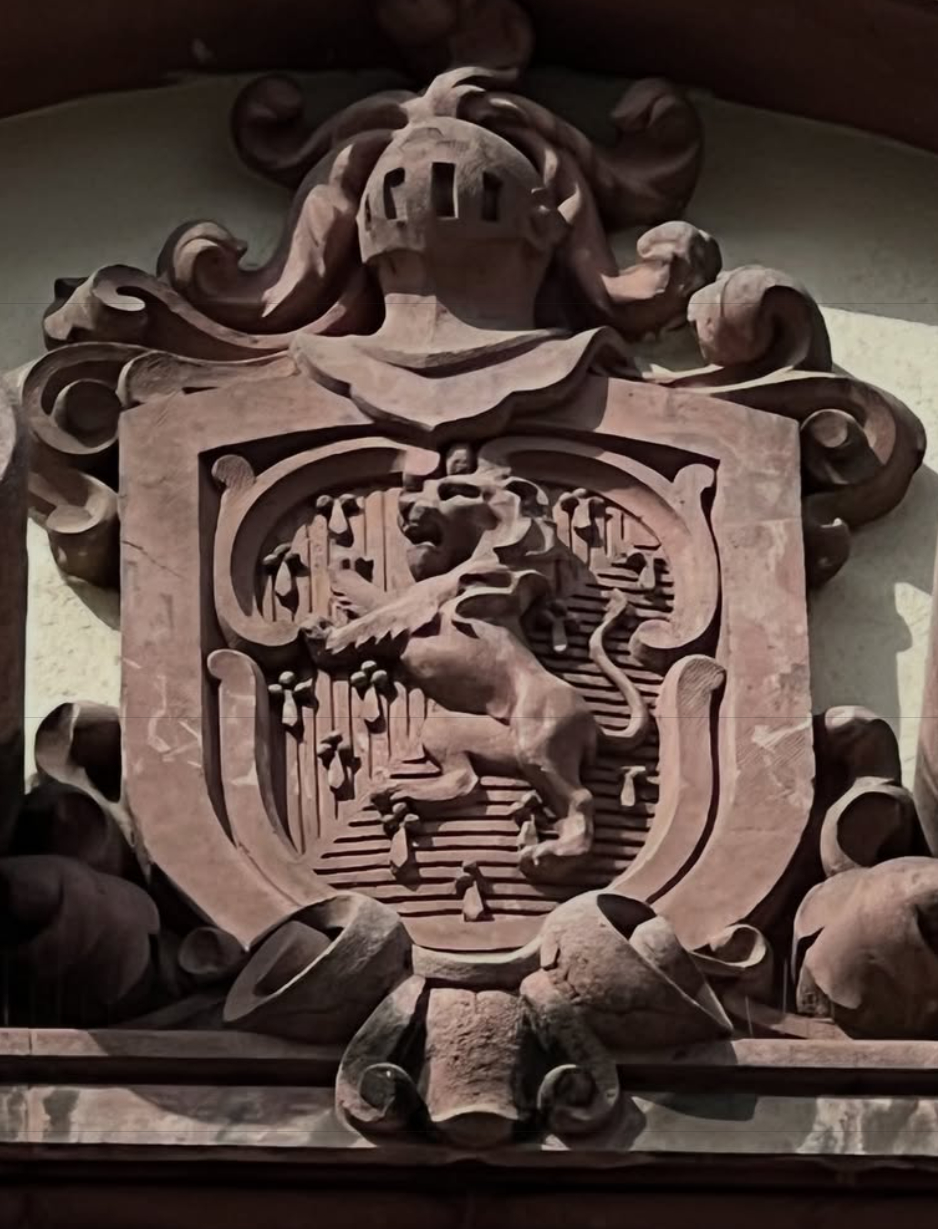
- The Edwards family coat of arms on the frontispiece of Luisa Ariztía House in Santiago
- Country: Chile
- Place of origin: England, United Kingdom
- Founded: 19th century
- Founder: George Edwards Brown

The Edwards family of Chile is of English origin. They became financially and politically influential during the 19th century. They have played and still play a significant role in Chilean politics, especially as owners of its most influential newspaper chain, El Mercurio S.A.P. Under the supervision of Agustín Edwards Eastman, El Mercurio played an important role in the propaganda campaign to influence public opinion against Salvador Allende and in favor of the military coup that brought Augusto Pinochet to power.

== Main branch ==
- George "Jorge" Edwards Brown (1780–1848), a British-born Chilean doctor, businessperson, politician and founder of the family in Chile; married Isabel Ossandón Iribarren (1784–1830); married Buenaventura Argandoña Subercaseaux (1804–1844), a landowner and benefactor of Coquimbo Province
  - José Joaquín Domingo Felipe Benicio Edwards Ossandón (1808–1869) businessperson, politician and first Mayor of Coquimbo; married Margarita Garriga Argandoña
    - Joaquín Edwards Garriga
      - Joaquín Edwards Bello (1887–1968), writer and journalist
    - Luis Edwards Garriga
      - Jorge Edwards Valdés (1931–2023) novelist, winner of the 1999 Cervantes Prize
    - Guillermo Edwards Garriga (1855–1921) geographic engineer and politician; married Rosario Matte Pérez
      - Guillermo Edwards Matte (1889–1945) lawyer and politician; married María Hurtado Quesney
      - Ismael Edwards Matte (1891–1954) architect and politician; married Luz Izquierdo Tupper
  - Juan Bautista Edwards Ossandón (1811–1900); married Ventura Argandoña O'Shee
    - Alberto Edwards Argandoña (1848–1891) lawyer and politician; married María Luisa Vives Pomar
      - Luis Alberto Edwards Vives (1874–1932) lawyer, writer, publicist and politician; married Magdalena Vives Solar
      - María Luisa Edwards Vives (1879–1957); married Alberto Decombe Echazarreta
        - Alberto Decombe Edwards (1907–1995) lawyer, farmer and United Conservative Party politician; married Olivia Villalobos Arteaga
  - José Santiago Edwards Ossandón (1812–1872)
    - Enrique Edwards Garriga (1849–1898); married Isabel Atherton Goñi
      - Lionel Edwards Atherton (1888– 1948) engineer and Radical Party politician; married Carolina Orrego Salazar, Esther Orrego Salazar and Eliana Dumás Sotomayor
        - Pía Figueroa Edwards journalist, writer, politician and founding member of the Humanist Party; married José Gabriel Feres Nazarala
    - Ventura Edwards Garriga (c. 1882–); married José Rafael Salas Errázuriz
      - Ricardo Salas Edwards (1870–1939) lawyer and politician; married this cousin Elena González Edwards
    - Eduardo Ramón Edwards Garriga (1845–1916)
      - Adela Edwards Salas (1874–1939) teacher and philanthropist
      - Monseñor Rafael Edwards Salas (1878–1938) priest, professor, and bishop
    - Benjamín Edwards Garriga (1850–1921) politician and director of La Unión (Valparaíso); married Josefina Sutil Borges
  - José Agustín de Dios Edwards Ossandón (1815–1878), businessperson, mining entrepreneur, banker, politician and owner of El Mercurio de Valparaíso; married his niece Juana Ross Edwards (1830–1913), a philanthropist
    - Agustín Edwards Ross (1852–1897), businessperson, politician, and owner of El Mercurio de Valparaíso and La Época
      - Raúl Edwards Mac-Clure (1880–1927), businessperson and politician
      - Agustín Edwards Mac-Clure (1878–1941), businessperson, diplomat and politician, President of the League of Nations and founder of the Santiago edition of El Mercurio newspaper
        - Agustín Roberto Edwards Budge (1899–1956) businessperson, owner and president of El Mercurio Sociedad Anónima Periodística, and director of El Mercurio; married Maria Isabel Eastman Beeche
          - Agustín Edwards Eastman (1927–2017), politician, business man and Chilean newspaper publisher; married Maria Luisa del Rio Fernandez
            - Cristián Edwards del Río, businessperson and kidnapping victim
          - Roberto Edwards Eastman (1937–2022) businessperson, artist and photographer
      - María Edwards McClure de Errázuriz (1893–1972), social worker, nurse and member of the French Resistance; married Guillermo Errázuriz Vergara (1892–1922), a diplomat and member of the Vergara family; married Jacques Feydeau, a French writer and son of Georges Feydeau.

== Other notable members ==
- Jaime Jorge Guzmán Errázuriz (1946–1991) constitutional law lawyer, professor, politician, founder of the Independent Democratic Union and collaborator of the Pinochet military dictatorship; son of Carmen Errázuriz Edwards and Jorge Guzmán Reyes, and member of the Errázuriz family
- Sebastián Edwards (1953–) Chilean-American economist; great-grandson of Benjamín Edwards Garriga
- José Manuel Rojo Edwards Silva (né José Manuel Ismael Edwards Silva; 1977–) civil engineer and politician; son of José Manuel Edwards and Virginia Silva, and great-grandson of Ismael Edwards Matte; married Maribel Florez
- Luis Emilio Edwards Leyton (1984–) actor and dancer
- Lautaro Edwards (1998–) renowned poet of the 2000s generation. Founder of the "Ultrapoesía" movement.

== See also ==
- El Mercurio
- History of Chile
- Edwards (surname)
