= Ignacio Agüero =

Chilean documentary filmmaker (born 1952)

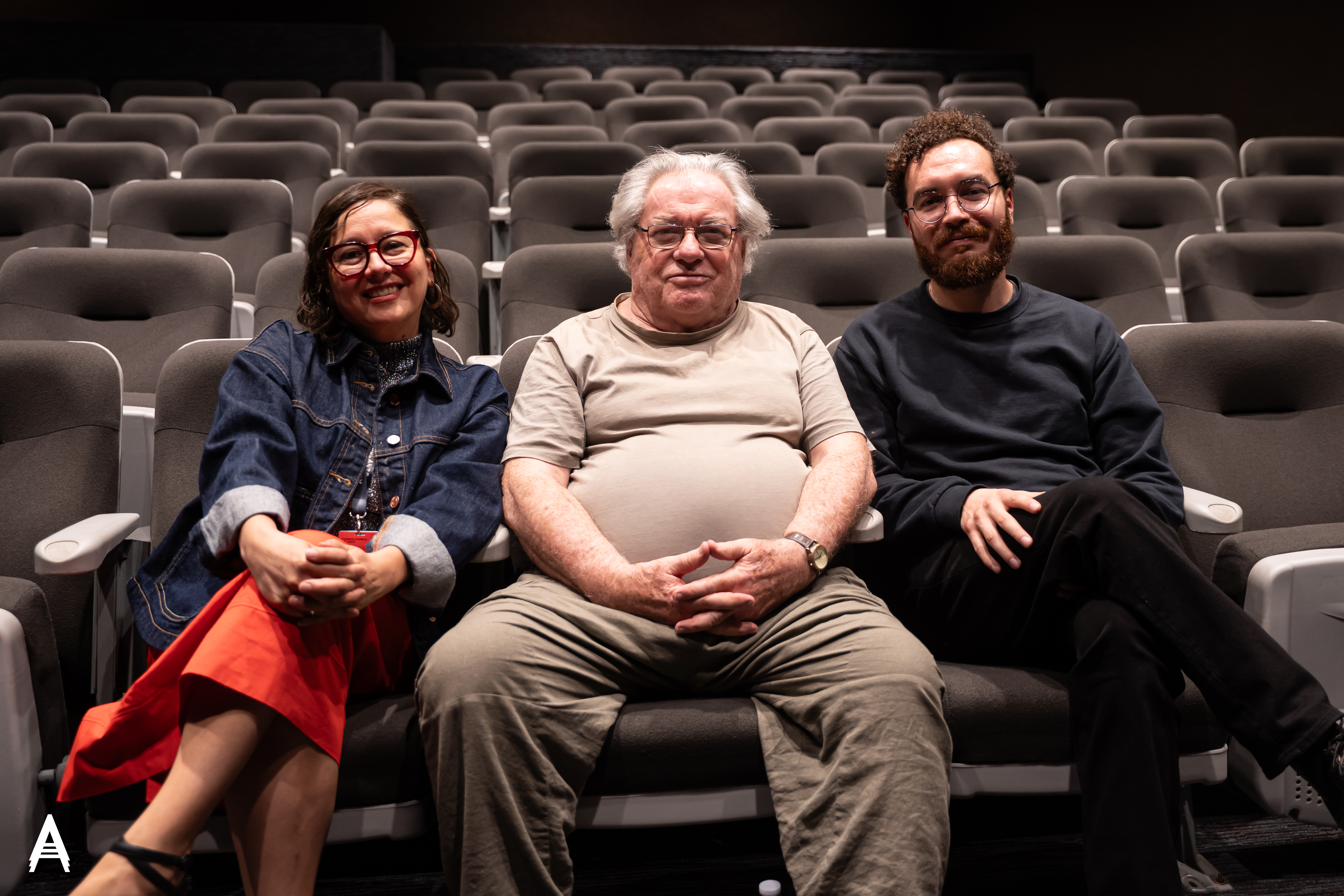
- Born: 7 March 1952; Santiago de Chile
- Occupation: Film director
- Years active: 1977–present

Ignacio Agüero (born 7 March 1952) is a Chilean documentary filmmaker who famously co-directed No to Pinochet television spots during Chile's 1988 referendum. He is also known for his work as a character actor in art films and TV miniseries' directed by Raúl Ruiz and José Luis Torres Leiva.

== Select filmography ==
=== Director ===
- Aquí se construye (1977)
- No olvidar (1982)
- Como me da la gana (1985)
- One Hundred Children Waiting for a Train (1988)
- Dreams of Ice (1993)
- Neruda, todo el amor (1998)
- Aquí se construye (o Ya no existe el lugar donde nací) (2000)
- Agustín's Newspaper (2008)
- The Other Day (2013)

=== Actor ===
- Days in the Country (2004)
- La Recta Provincia (2007)
- Litoral (2008)
- The Sky, the Earth and the Rain (2008)
- Summer (2011)
- Voice Over (2014)
