= Hay Group Global R&D Center for Strategy Execution =

Hay Group Global Research Center for Strategy Execution is the first global research center on Strategy Execution of Hay Group. Established in October 2008 in Singapore, it leads research activities and coordinates Hay Group's global research networks located in Paris, São Paulo, Frankfurt, Boston and London. The center also receives supports from the Singapore Economic Development Board.

== History ==
The center is set up under Hay Group's Building Effective Organizations (BEO) practice and supported by Singapore Economic Development Board as part of a national effort to establish a global hub for organizational effectiveness and excellence. Its opening is mentioned in Singapore Senior Minister Goh Chok Tong's speech in the Singapore Human Capital Summit 2008.

Established back in 2008 as the Global BEO R&D center, its activities were officially launched in 2009 under the leadership of Dr. Andreas Raharso as its Dean (Director). Later in 2009, it was renamed as Global R&D center for Strategy Execution. The center is currently based at Keppel Tower in Singapore.

== Research ==
Hay Group Global R&D Center for Strategy Execution conducts numerous research on a range of business topics which includes: Mergers and Acquisitions, Family Owned Business, Role of Corporate Center, Strategic Performance Management and Culture Transformation.

It also hosts and presents at global conferences for academic and practitioner leaders, including:

- Chair the plenary session in the annual international conference of Strategic Management Society in Rome, September 2010 on the topic: "Strategy Execution: Eastern Perspective on Self Organization".
- Co-chair the special conference of Strategic Management Society in Singapore, June 2012 on the topic: "Globalization Of Innovation Strategies: Novel Moves for a Global Game".
