= Sihame El Kaouakibi =

Belgian politician

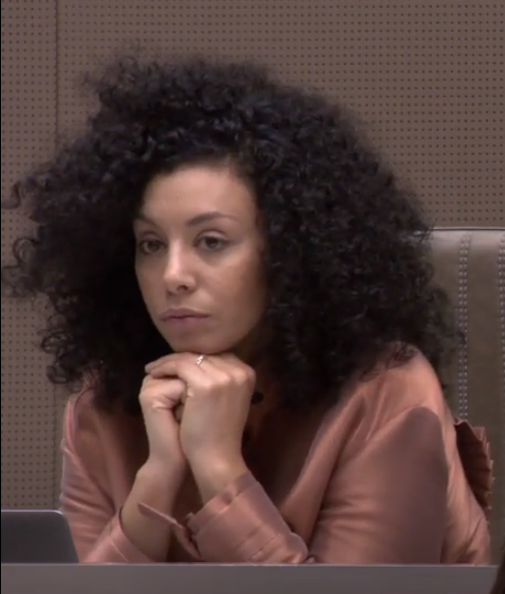
- Sihame El Kaouakibi

Member of the Flemish Parliament
- In office 2019–2024

Personal details
- Born: 9 July 1986 (age 40) Boom
- Party: Independent
- Occupation: Politician
- Website: sihame.be

Sihame El Kaouakibi (born 9 July 1986) is a former Belgian politician and the founder of the Let's Go Urban project. In 2021, she was accused of fraudulent use of government subsidies. Almost 1 million euro is claimed to have been used for her own profit.

== Early life and education ==
El Kaouakibi grew up in Boom as the second-youngest of seven children in a family of Moroccan descent. She trained to be a primary school teacher at the Artesis Hogeschool in Antwerp from 2005 to 2008. She then completed a Master's in Educational Sciences at the Vrije Universiteit Brussel from 2008 to 2013.

== Career ==
In 2009, El Kaouakibi founded Let's Go Urban; in 2013, Youth and Urban Projects; and in 2014, A Woman's View. In 2014, she was nominated as a member of the board of directors of the Flemish public broadcaster VRT by the political party Open Vld. In 2019, Open Vld placed her on their electoral list for the Flemish Parliament. She was elected with 10,704 votes. In 2021, she left the party after the financial scandal emerged. She remained active in the Flemish Parliament until the end of her term in 2024, as an independent politician, but has been on sick leave since October 2020.

== Financial scandals ==
In February 2021, an inquiry was opened for potential financial fraud at her organisation Let's Go Urban. An independent audit was performed and several obscure financial constructions were found. Following the potential problems found by the audit, the city of Antwerp opened an investigation regarding several thousands in subsidies given to Let's Go Urban to figure out what happened with the money. The public prosecutor's office of Antwerp also opened an investigation regarding the potential fraud by El Kaouakibi.

El Kaouakibi herself filed a complaint against unknown persons. According to her, documents were adjusted and leaked to the press.

On 28 March 2021, VTM Nieuws provided evidence of potential fraud with invoices. In a preliminary report, a potential €450,000 in subsidies was embezzled from Let's Go Urban to El Kaouakibi's private accounts.

Based on the preliminary report regarding potential embezzlement, the Federal Public Service Interior started an investigation regarding subsidies given to WeLoveBxl, the Brussels branch of Let's Go Urban.

In early April 2021, the city of Antwerp had the assets of El Kaouakibi seized after reports that she wanted to sell real estate. A new audit from the city of Antwerp showed that €350,000 were embezzled.

The Antwerp prosecutor's office requested that the Flemish Parliament lift her parliamentary immunity on two occasions, in October 2022 and October 2023.

On October 3, the Judge's chambers (court of first instance that adjucates on fairly simple criminal issues, usually in closed session) takes a decision in the El Kaouakibi case.

== Awards ==
- 2018: Global Diversity Award by Stanton Chase
