= Joaquín Edwards Bello =

Chilean writer (1887–1968)

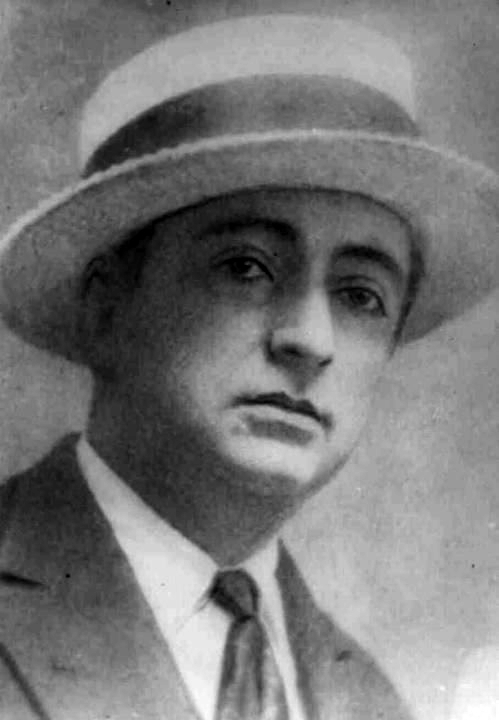
- Joaquín Edwards Bello c.1930
- Born: Víctor Lorenzo Joaquín Edwards Bello; 10 May 1887; Valparaíso, Valparaíso Province, Chile
- Died: 19 February 1968 (aged 80); Santiago, Chile
- Burial place: Santiago General Cemetery
- Other name: Jacques Edwards
- Occupations: Writer; journalist
- Political party: National Socialist Movement of Chile (until 1939)
- Spouses: Ángeles Dupuy Ruiz de Alarcón; Martha Albornoz
- Children: 2
- Relatives: George Edwards Brown (paternal great-grandfather); Andrés Bello (maternal great-grandfather)
- Family: Edwards family
- Awards: Atenea Award (1931); National Prize for Literature (1943); National Prize for Journalism (1959)

Joaquín Edwards Bello (Spanish pronunciation: [xoaˈkin eˈðwaɾðs ˈβeʝo]; 10 May 1887–19 February 19 1968) was a Chilean writer and journalist of British descent.

== Life ==
Joaquín Edwards Bello was born on the 10 May 1887, in Valparaíso to Ana Luisa Bello Rozas and Joaquín Edwards Garriga. Edwards studied at The Mackay School and later at the Liceo Eduardo de la Barra. To complete his education, his family decided in 1904 to send him to Europe. Edwards' first novel, El inútil (The Useless One would be the translation), generated such reactions in Santiago that he emigrated to Brazil for some time. The main character was Eduardo Briset Lacerda, a rich young man with social conscience, like Edwards.

Edward Bello was a strong supporter of the National Socialist Movement of Chile.

Suffering from Hemiparesis, Edwards Bello shot himself in 1968.

== Awards ==
- Atenea Award, University of Concepción (1932)
- Premio Marcial Martínez (1934)
- Premio Nacional de Literatura de Chile (1943)
- National Prize for Journalism (1959)
- Decoration Hijo Ilustre de Valparaíso (1958)

== Bibliography ==
- El inútil (Santiago, Imprenta y Litografía Universo, 1910)
- El mounstruo: novela de costumbres chilenas (Imprenta La Ilustración)
- El roto (Santiago, Editorial Chilena, 1920)
- La muerte de Vanderbilt (Cóndor, 1922)
- El nacionalismo continental (Madrid, Imp. G. Hernández y Galo Sáez, 1925; ampliada con 2ª y 3ª partes, Santiago, Ediciones Ercilla, 1935)
- El chileno en Madrid (Santiago, Nascimento, 1928)
- Cap Polonio (La novela nueva, 1929)
- Valparaíso, la ciudad del viento (Santiago, Nascimento, 1931).
- Criollos en París (Santiago, Nascimento, 1933)
- La chica del Crillón (Santiago, Ercilla, 1935)
- Crónicas (Santiago, Zig-Zag, 1964)

== See also ==
- Edwards family
