= Agustín's Newspaper =

Agustin's Newspaper
- Directed by: Ignacio Agüero
- Written by: Ignacio Agüero; Fernando Villagrán
- Produced by: Ignacio Agüero; Fernando Villagrán
- Cinematography: Gabriel Díaz; Ricardo Lorca
- Music by: Giorgio Varas; Cristián López
- Production companies: Ignacio Aguero & Asociados; Amazonía films
- Release date: November 20, 2008
- Running time: 80 minutes
- Country: Chile
- Language: Spanish

Agustin's Newspaper (Spanish: El diario de Agustín) is a 2008 Chilean documentary film directed by Ignacio Agüero.

== Plot ==
Journalism students start an investigation about the editorial line of El Mercurio S.A.P., a media corporation owned by Agustín Edwards Eastman that publishes Chilean daily newspapers El Mercurio, La Segunda, and Las Últimas Noticias.

The documentary focuses particularly on the role of El Mercurio, Chile’s leading conservative newspaper. The events covered include the land reform that occurred during the Eduardo Frei Montalva government, the opposition to Salvador Allende, the collaboration with Augusto Pinochet's military government, and the position held until the arrival of democracy in Chile. Overall, it presents a strong indictment of the newspaper and its editor, which are accused of public opinion manipulation, especially with disinformation campaigns.

== Chapters ==
- I. El Mercurio Lies
- II. Foreign Help Is on the Way
- III. The 119
- IV. Crime of Passion
- V. A Guide for Society
- VI. Slanders and Libels
- VII. Epilogue

== Awards ==
The film won an Altazor Award in 2009 for best director in a documentary film.
