= Ted Cohen (music industry executive) =

American music executive

Ted Cohen (born January 6, 1949) is an American digital entertainment industry executive. Having worked in senior management positions at EMI Music, Warner Bros. Records and Philips Media, Cohen is currently the Managing Partner of TAG Strategic.

Cohen currently chairs the Visionary Committee for MidemNet, served on the NARAS (Grammy) Los Angeles chapter Board of Governors as well as the National Trustee Board and currently co-chairs the Grammy Technology Committee. Cohen serves on the board of directors for the Neil Bogart Memorial Fund, Lyricfind.com, and Music.com, and works in the music and technology education programs the Grammy In The Schools Program and MusiCares. Cohen also served two terms as the Chairman of the Mobile Entertainment Forum Americas in 2006 and 2007.

On March 19, 2013, Cohen was selected as the recipient of music business association NARM’s Presidential Award for Sustained Industry Achievement.

== Early life ==
In 1964, Cohen frequented The Mike Douglas Show in Cleveland, OH. At the time, at 14 years old, he met Rolling Stones, The Beach Boys and The Byrds through the television talk show. He later started managing bands in high school and during this time managed Eric Carmen who would later form Raspberries.

In 1967, he moved to Ithaca, New York to attend Ithaca College. He promoted shows at school, worked at clubs booking bands and worked for college radio station WICB for two years. As a result, his grades suffered and he was told to go home for a semester. He later enrolled at John Carroll University in Cleveland and moved back to Ohio in summer of 1969. He became music director for the college radio station WJCU. That year, the Woodstock music festival took place in and Cohen promoted the festival in Ohio by giving out tickets through the then-influential radio station.

== Local Record Promoter to Director of Artist Development: 1970–1984 ==
In June 1970, Cohen became Assistant Buyer at Disc Records - a 34 store national music retail chain based in Cleveland. A year later, he was hired as local record promoter at Columbia Records and moved to Cincinnati, OH. At Columbia Records, Cohen worked on releases by Chicago, Blood, Sweat & Tears and Boz Scaggs.

In the Fall of 1971, he was recruited by Warner Bros. Records under the same job profile of a local record promoter. Two years later, he was promoted to Director of East Coast Artist Development and relocated to Boston, MA. Over the next 10 years, he worked with Alice Cooper, The Doobie Brothers, Fleetwood Mac, The Who, Van Halen, Prince, Talking Heads, Robert Palmer, The Beach Boys, The Sex Pistols, George Benson, The Pretenders, The Ramones, Roxy Music, Asia, and Al Jarreau.

At the suggestion of the audio and video inventor Henry Kloss, Cohen started attending the Consumer Electronics Show (CES) in Chicago in 1976. In 1979, Atari gave Cohen an Atari 800 home computer and a 300 baud Hayes Smartmodem.

In 1982, Warner Bros. Records creative executive Stan Cornyn asked Cohen to join a new media work group, a cross-division effort between Warner Bros. Records and Atari, Inc.. The group was led by GUI creator Alan Kay and, along with Cohen, included Voyager/Criterion founder Robert Stein & audio expert Al McPherson. The purpose of the group was to look at the new interaction between the nascent personal computer and the imminent debut of the Compact Disc and CD-ROM, and their combined impact on the consumer music market in the coming years.

On April 23, 1984, Cohen resigned his position at Warner Bros. Records after watching the rock mockumentary This is Spinal Tap the previous night with Robert Fripp & Tony Levin from King Crimson.

== Transition to Technology: 1984–2006 ==
Cohen joined Westwood One on June 1, 1984, as Head of Talent Acquisition and worked on projects for Elton John, Stevie Nicks, Foreigner, Charles Manson, and Neil Young. After a year, he left his job at Westwood One and joined Sandy Gallin, Morey & Associates, an artist management firm. During his tenure there, he worked with Dolly Parton, The Pointer Sisters, Neil Diamond, Donny Osmond, Paul Shaffer and America.

In 1986, Cohen held a senior management position with Cypress Records, where he was instrumental in the marketing and promotion of releases from Jesse Colin Young, Kenny Rankin, Southside Johnny and the critically acclaimed Famous Blue Raincoat album from Jennifer Warnes. In 1987, he started consulting Philips Media on Interactive Media Projects for CD-i. Ted left Cypress Records in September, 1989 and joined Philips Media full-time as Producer of CD-i Music titles. He went on to work on titles from The Cranberries, Santana, Dave Matthews and Soundgarden, among many others. Ted was promoted to VP of Music in 1994 and worked with Philips Media for 3 years till December 1996, when the company was slated to be phased out by the parent corporation, Philips, the staff reduced from 200+ to only 10 caretakers.

Over the next 3 years, Cohen worked as a digital music and media consultant for Liquid Audio, Napster, Microsoft, Amplified, Universal Studios, Rioport, Amazon, Wherehouse Music, DreamWorks Records and music.com, among others. During this period, he co-created the Webnoize Conference in Los Angeles in 1998 and MidemNet in January 2000 in Cannes, France.

On May 8, 2000, Cohen joined EMI as VP of New Media and was subsequently promoted to SVP of Digital Development & Distribution. During his tenure with EMI, Cohen worked in EMI's digital initiatives, focusing on establishing consumer distribution partnerships, as well as asset management and the digital delivery processes. He was involved in negotiating the agreements for iTunes, Napster, Rhapsody among 100+ digital licensing deals. He additionally worked on the digital marketing campaigns for Joss Stone’s first two S-Curve/Virgin albums. In May 2006, he resigned to return to digital entertainment consulting.

== TAG Strategic: 2006–present ==
Cohen launched TAG Strategic on July 5, 2006. TAG's initial few clients included Gibson Guitar Corporation, Muze, EMI Music, Limewire, EyeSpot and Participant Media. Since then, TAG Strategic has gone on to work with Coca-Cola, Verizon Communications, SanDisk, Hello Music, Stream Jam, UK Trade & Investment, Buymyplaylist.com and Emblaze Mobile, among many others.

TAG Strategic recently tied up with Rosenzweig & Company, the international recruitment firm led by Jay Rosenzweig, and Blue Frog as key strategic partners.
