= List of Chilean magazines =

The following is a list of magazines published in Chile.

== Political magazines ==
- Ercilla - Biweekly magazine
- Punto Final - fortnightly magazine
- Qué Pasa - weekly magazine, owned by COPESA

== Entertainment magazines ==
- Glamorama - included in the Friday edition of La Tercera
- TV y Novelas - owned by Televisa
- Wikén - included in the Friday edition of El Mercurio

== Women's magazines ==
- Cosmopolitan - owned by Televisa

== Outdoor magazines ==
- Patagon Journal - bilingual magazine about Patagonia
- Escalando - climbing magazine
- Outdoors - adventure sports magazine

== Humor magazines ==
- Condorito - owned by Televisa

== Trade magazines ==
- Boletín Minero - published by the National Mining Society
- Revista de Marina - published by the Chilean Navy

== See also ==
- List of Chilean newspapers
- Television in Chile
- Media of Chile
