= Korn Ferry =

American management consulting firm

- Type: Public
- Traded as: NYSE: KFY; S&P 600 Component
- Industry: Professional services
- Founded: November 14, 1969; 56 years ago
- Founders: Lester Korn; Richard Ferry
- Headquarters: 1900 Avenue of the Stars, Los Angeles, California, USA
- Key people: Gary Burnison (CEO)
- Products: Executive search, Management Consulting, Outsourcing, SaaS
- Revenue: ▲US $1.926 billion (FY19)
- Net income: ▲US $102.7 million (FY19)
- Number of employees: 8,198 (2020)
- Website: www.kornferry.com

Korn Ferry is an American management consulting firm headquartered in Los Angeles, California. It was founded in 1969 and as of 2019, operates in 111 offices in 53 countries and employs 8,198 people worldwide. Korn Ferry operates through four business segments: Consulting, Digital, Executive Search, Recruitment Process Outsourcing and Professional Search.

== History ==
Korn Ferry was founded in 1969 by Lester Korn and Richard Ferry. The two first met in 1962, when they worked for Los Angeles accounting firm Peat, Marwick, Mitchell.

In 1972 the firm went public with an initial public offering (IPO), but in 1974 reacquired all outstanding shares to become private again. In 1973 Korn Ferry formed Tokyo, Japan-based Korn Ferry International Japan. With the opening in 1975 of Korn Ferry International Singapore, the company had 41 offices in 20 countries. In 1977 they acquired the Mexico City firm, Hazzard & Associados. In 1978 they opened offices in Malaysia and Hong Kong, and acquired the UK firm John Stork. In 1979 the company acquired Australian-based Guy Pease Associates.

In 1981 the company became the largest executive search firm in the world, with Lester Korn serving as chairman and CEO. In 1987 the firm opened an office in Bangkok, Thailand. They then had 37 offices in fifteen countries servicing around 1,250 client corporations and organizations. In 1989, the firm's revenues exceeded $100 million for the first time.

In May 1991 Lester Korn retired as chairman and Richard Ferry, the president and CEO, assumed the additional role of chairman. Following this, the firm initiated several office closures. In 1992 Korn Ferry implemented a video-conferencing system for screening job candidates. In 1993, the firm acquired Carre Orban and Partners and merged its European operations into a firm branded in Europe as Korn/Ferry Carre/Orban International. In the next five years, the firm opened their first offices in India (1994), China (1995), Indonesia (1996), and South Korea (1998).

In August 1998, Korn Ferry partnered with The Wall Street Journal to start Futurestep.com, aimed at the middle management level. By 2001 Futurestep had been rolled out to 22 countries; it incurred worldwide losses of $60 million through January 31, 2001.

In 1999 Korn Ferry acquired the German firm Hofman Herbold and the Australian firm Amrop International. In 2000 it acquired the London-based PA Consulting Group for an estimated $35M. In 2000, the company purchased Boston-based financial services search firm Westgate Group, and Canada-based Pratzer & Partners Inc.

During an executive-search industry contraction, Korn Ferry's 2001 redundancies were "more dramatic than those of competitors who aren't publicly traded" such as Spencer Stuart and Russell Reynolds Associates. This was reported and attributed to having "expanded so heavily during the technology boom" coupled with Korn Ferry's new CEO Paul C. Reilly choosing to "send a message to shareholders."

In 2001 Korn Ferry purchased Levy Kerson, Helstrom Turner & Associates, and Pearson, Caldwell, and Farnworth. In 2005 the firm moved its regional head office to Shanghai, China, and had a total of 73 offices in forty countries. In 2006 Korn Ferry acquired leadership development tools firm Lominger Limited of Golden Valley for $24M.

In 2007 Gary Burnison became the company's new CEO. That year the company acquired LeaderSource. In 2008 they acquired Lore International Institute, and in June 2009, they acquired the London-based Whitehead Mann. In 2010 they acquired Sensa Solutions, in 2013 Korn Ferry completed its acquisition of Minneapolis-based PDI Ninth House for $80M; in 2015 they acquired Pivot Leadership and Hay Group.

In 2018 Korn Ferry took a one-time, non-cash intangible asset impairment charge of $106 million, or $79 million on an after-tax basis, to account for rebranding its entire business simply as "Korn Ferry," and sunsetting all the Company's sub-brands, including Futurestep, Hay Group, and Lominger.

According to a list maintained by the Yale School of Management, in March 2022, the company continued to do business in Russia despite a widespread boycott after the Russian invasion of Ukraine. In April 2022, the company suspended its operations in Russia.

=== Whitehead Mann ===
Whitehead Mann was a London-based executive search firm that was acquired by Korn/Ferry International in June 2009.

Whitehead Engineering was founded by Clive Whitehead, who on marriage merged his firm with that of his wife's, the psychologist Anna Mann (Mann Recruitment), to form Whitehead Mann in the 1970s. The firm listed on the AIM part of FTSE in 1997. By 2003 the company had market capitalisation of £33 million mainly through acquisition, with offices in London, Paris, Frankfurt, Hong Kong and New York; together with training and advisory divisions.

During the dot.com boom, the firm's fortunes climbed and fell. After strategy disagreements with new CEO Gerard Clery-Melin, in 2003 Mann announced her decision to leave the firm, subsequently setting up MWM Consulting in 2004. In 2006, the company was subject of a £26 million management buyout, financed by investor Palladian Investors, a division of Och-Ziff. Carol Leonard subsequently took a six-month sabbatical as head of search, and then left the firm in February 2009.

=== Litigation ===
In 2005 Korn Ferry accused one of its former star recruiters, David Nosal, of stealing confidential client data to establish his own competing firm. In 2008 Nosal was charged under the Computer Fraud and Abuse Act (CFAA). In 2016 the US 9th Circuit Court of Appeals ruled, in United States v Nosal, that Nosal's was a criminal act under CFAA." In 2018 Nosal was ordered to prison.

== Sponsorship ==
On June 19, 2019, the PGA Tour and Korn Ferry announced they had entered a 10-year agreement making Korn Ferry the Umbrella Sponsor of the newly named Korn Ferry Tour, the developmental tour for the PGA Tour. In replacing Web.com, Korn Ferry's sponsorship extends through the 2028 season. The Korn Ferry Tour awards PGA Tour membership to the Tour's 50 leading players, including the top 25 from the Regular Season points list and the top 25 from the three-event Korn Ferry Tour Finals points list.

== Notable people ==
- Prith Banerjee (born 1960), Indian American academic and computer scientist
- Bob Casey (rugby union) (born 1978), Irish rugby player
- Sjoerd Hamburger (born 1983), Dutch Olympic rower
- Gordon Orlikow (born 1960), Canadian decathlon, heptathlon, and hurdles competitor, Athletics Canada Chairman, Canadian Olympic Committee member, Korn/Ferry International partner
- Ron Pelosi (born 1934), American businessman and public figure
- Mark Richardson (sprinter) (born 1972), British Olympic sprinter
- Stephen Joel Trachtenberg (born 1937), 15th President of George Washington University
- Stephen A. Unger (born 1946), American recruiter
- Ronald H. Walker (born 1937), American executive
