= Ex-Ante (online newspaper) =

Chilean news

- Website type: Online newspaper
- Available in: Spanish
- Owner: CBR Servicios Periodísticos SpA
- Website: www.ex-ante.cl
- Current status: Active

Ex-Ante is news website covering Chilean politics. The website was created in late 2020 by journalist Cristián Bofill. Reportedly it was modeled on the existing news website Politico. The site is owned by the company CBR Servicios Periodísticos SpA that Bofill created on August 19, 2020. Various of the involved journalist have a background either in La Tercera or El Mercurio. It has been described as personal project of Bofill who in 2021 sought to increase its capital with 1,575 million Chilean pesos. According to academic and politician Alberto Mayol Ex-Ante has been targeting Mayor of Recoleta Daniel Jadue for negative coverage. The website was developed by LFI, a Chilean technology company.
