= $9.99 =

2009 Australian film by Tatia Rosenthal

- Theatrical poster
- Directed by: Tatia Rosenthal
- Written by: Etgar Keret; Tatia Rosenthal
- Starring: Geoffrey Rush; Anthony LaPaglia
- Music by: Christopher Bowen
- Production companies: Film Finance Corporation Australia; Israel Film Fund yes. Keshet International; New South Wales Film & Television Office; Crossfield; Sherman Pictures; Lama Films
- Distributed by: Icon Film Distribution
- Release date: 4 September 2008 (Toronto)
- Running time: 78 minutes
- Country: Australia
- Language: English

$9.99 is a 2008 Australian adult stop-motion animated drama film written and directed by Tatia Rosenthal, with the screenplay by Etgar Keret. The film marks the third collaboration between Rosenthal and Keret. It features a voice cast of Geoffrey Rush, Samuel Johnson, Anthony LaPaglia, Joel Edgerton, Ben Mendelsohn and Claudia Karvan.

== Premise ==
Unemployed, 28 year old Dave Peck finds an advertisement for a book that will tell him the meaning of life "for the low price of $9.99." On his quest to find the true meaning of life, he crosses paths with a colourful collection of neighbours including an old man and his guardian angel, a magician, a bewitching woman, a brokenhearted man and a little boy.

== Cast ==
- Geoffrey Rush as The Angel / Homeless Man
- Anthony LaPaglia as Jim
- Samuel Johnson as Dave Peck
- Claudia Karvan as Michelle
- Joel Edgerton as Ron
- Barry Otto as Albert
- Leeanna Walsman as Tanita
- Ben Mendelsohn as Lenny
- Jamie Katsamatsas as Zack
- Brian Meagan as Clement
- Roy Billing as Marcus Portman / Policeman #1
- Leon Ford as Stanton
- Ursula Yovich as Camille
- Josef Ber

== Release and reception ==
$9.99 premiered at the Toronto International Film Festival on 4 September 2008. The film was then released in Los Angeles and New York on 19 June 2009 and then in Australia on 17 September 2009. Upon release, the film earned mostly positive reviews. As of February 2019, it holds a "Fresh" score of 73% on the film review website Rotten Tomatoes with an average rating of 6.5 out of 10, according with 55 reviews. The site's critical consensus states, "Its storyline isn't as wondrous as its visuals, but $9.99 has a sophistication and handmade charm that sets it apart from the animated pack." Metacritic gave the film 68/100 based on 15 critics giving it generally favorable reviews.

=== Box office ===
$9.99 took $47,300 at the box office in Australia. The film's worldwide total was $708,354.

== Awards and nominations ==
Year	Award	Category	Result	Ref.
2008	Stockholm International Film Festival	Bronze Horse	Nominated	
2009	Mexico City International Contemporary Film Festival (FICCO)	Audience Award for Best Feature	Won	
2009	Mexico City International Contemporary Film Festival (FICCO)	Best Female Director	Won	
2009	Anima Brussels	Best Feature	Won	
2009	Monstra Lisbon Animation Festival	Grand Prize	Won	
2009	Annie Awards	Best Animated Feature	Nominated	
2009	Annie Awards	Directing in an Animated Feature Production	Nominated	
2009	Aubange International Film Festival	Best Screenplay	Won	

== See also ==
- Cinema of Australia
