= Transearch International =

TRANSEARCH International
- Company type: Limited company
- Industry: Executive search
- Founded: April 2, 1982
- Headquarters: London, United Kingdom
- Number of locations: 57 partner offices in 38 countries
- Area served: International
- Website: transearch.com

Transearch International (stylized TRANSEARCH International) is an executive search network organisations. Headquartered in Europe, they have representation in The Americas, Asia Pacific, Europe, Middle East and Africa. Executive Recruiter News (ERN) currently rates the firm as the 10th largest global executive search firm. The firm is organized in partner offices by market expertise, business function and geographic location.

== History ==
Transearch International was founded on April 2, 1982. with 6 offices and 20 consultants. The network quickly grew to 25 offices in 1989 and in 1990 was ranked as the 10th largest executive search firm (in terms of revenue) globally by the Executive Recruiter News (ERN). In 1998, the network had 68 offices in 40 countries and was the second largest network worldwide in terms of office representation. When the dot com bubble burst in 2001, most executive search firms faced a decline in demand for executive search services which lasted until about 2003-2004 (depending on the location and the sector of specialisation). In 2006 Transearch showed a 28.6% growth, almost 10% higher than the average rate of growth for the executive search industry.
