= Cypress Records =

- Founded: 1986
- Founder: Craig Sussman; Ted Cohen
- Defunct: 1991
- Distributor(s): A&M Records

Cypress Records was an American record label, founded in 1986 by Craig Sussman and Ted Cohen. Initially distributed in the United States by PolyGram, Cypress changed distribution to A&M Records in 1988. After A&M was sold PolyGram in January 1990, Cypress Records was distributed by Bertelsmann Music Group until the label was closed in 1991.

The label's roster included Tower of Power, David Knopfler, Jennifer Warnes, Jive Bunny and the Mastermixers. and Michael Damian (whose song Rock On became Cypress Records' sole #1 hit).

== See also ==
- List of record labels
