= Egon Zehnder =

Swiss management consulting firm

Egon Zehnder International Ltd.
- Type: Partnership
- Industry: Professional services
- Founded: 1964; 62 years ago
- Headquarters: Zurich, Switzerland
- Number of locations: 71 offices in 37 countries
- Key people: Francesco Buquicchio (CEO), Michael Ensser (Chair)
- Products: Management consulting Leadership solutions Executive search
- Revenue: CHF 804 million (2024)
- Number of employees: 600 Consultants, 350 researchers, 2000+ employees
- Website: egonzehnder.com

Egon Zehnder International Ltd. is a global management consulting and executive search firm. Egon Zehnder is the world's largest privately held executive search firm and the third largest executive search and talent strategy firm globally with an annual revenue of CHF 804 million.

== History ==
The firm was founded in 1964 by Egon P.S. Zehnder. In 1992, Zehnder, who at the time was 62, had transitioned out of running the firm and that A. Daniel Meiland, who had been the firm's regional director for North America, would be named chairman of the executive committee and chief executive officer.

By 2000, Egon Zehnder was the largest executive search firm in Europe.

== Senior management ==
=== List of CEOs ===
- Damien O’Brien (2008–2014)
- Rajeev Vasudeva (2014–2018)
- Edilson Camara (2018–2024)
- Francesco Buquicchio (2024–)

=== List of chairpersons ===
- Damien O'Brien (2010–2018).
- Jill Ader (2018–2022)
- Michael Ensser (2022–)
