= When Clouds Hide the Shadow =

- Theatrical release poster
- Directed by: José Luis Torres Leiva
- Written by: Alejandra Moffat; José Luis Torres Leiva
- Produced by: Catalina Vergara
- Starring: María Alché
- Cinematography: Cristián Soto
- Edited by: José Luis Torres Leiva, Andrea Chignoli
- Music by: Diego Noguera
- Production company: Globo Rojo Producciones
- Release dates: May 2, 2024 (JIFF); November 11, 2025 (Chile)
- Running time: 71 minutes
- Countries: Chile; Argentina; South Korea
- Language: Spanish

When Clouds Hide the Shadow (Spanish: Cuando las nubes esconden la sombra) is a 2024 docudrama film co-written, co-edited and directed by José Luis Torres Leiva. It stars María Alché as a film actress who wanders trapped in Puerto Williams because the film crew cannot reach the location to film the movie due to weather conditions.

== Synopsis ==
María travels to Puerto Williams to star in a movie. But the film crew can't arrive due to a violent storm. Alone, she seeks help for severe back pain, which leads her to discover life in the southernmost city in the world and a story unfinished in her life.

== Cast ==
- María Alché as María

== Release ==
The film had its world premiere on May 2, 2024, at the 25th Jeonju International Film Festival, then screened on September 20, 2024, at the 72nd San Sebastián International Film Festival, on October 17, 2024, at the 31st Valdivia International Film Festival, October 18, 2024, at the 5th Lima Alterna International Film Festival, on November 17, 2024, at the 28th Santiago International Documentary Festival, on November 26, 2024, at the 36th Viña del Mar International Film Festival, on March 24, 2025, at the 37th Toulouse Latin America Film Festival, on April 4, 2025, at the 64th Cartagena Film Festival, and on April 16, 2025, at the 43rd Uruguay International Film Festival.

The film was commercially released on November 11, 2025, in Chilean theaters.

== Accolades ==
Year	Award / Festival	Category	Recipient	Result	Ref.
2024	72nd San Sebastián International Film Festival	Horizontes Latinos Award	When Clouds Hide the Shadow	Nominated	
2025	3rd Latin American Film Festival in Paris	Jury Prize	When Clouds Hide the Shadow	Won	
