= Agustín Edwards Mac-Clure =

Chilean lawyer, diplomat and businessman

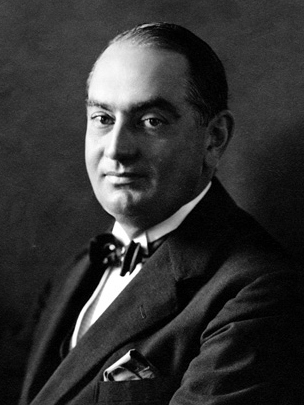
- Mac-Clure in 1922

President of the League of Nations
- In office 1922–1923
- Preceded by: Herman Adriaan van Karnebeek
- Succeeded by: Cosme de la Torriente

Personal details
- Born: June 17, 1878 Santiago, Chile
- Died: June 18, 1941 (aged 63) Santiago, Chile

Agustín Edwards Mac-Clure (June 17, 1878 – June 18, 1941) was a Chilean lawyer, diplomat and businessman, and founder of the Santiago edition of El Mercurio newspaper.

== Early life ==
Agustín Edwards was born in Santiago, the son of Agustín Edwards Ross and of Luisa McClure Ossandón.

== Career ==
In 1900 he founded the Santiago edition of El Mercurio newspaper, using the same name of the newspaper he inherited from his father and that was published in Valparaíso. He also wrote and published some history books: My Native Land, published in English; El Alba and Cuatro Presidentes de Chile, that refer to the administrations of presidents Prieto, Bulnes, Montt and Pérez. In May 1941, shortly before his death, he authored the foreword of Trout Fishing in Chilean Rivers.

He was a member of the lower house of the Chilean National Congress for four consecutive periods, between 1900 and 1910, representing the Partido Nacional. He was also Minister of Foreign Affairs, Cult and Colonization during the presidency of Germán Riesco, and again during the presidency of Pedro Montt, under whom he was also named Interior Minister. In 1910 he was named a plenipotentiary to Great Britain, and had a very important participation in the negotiations with Peru, with respect to the plebiscite that was to solve the question of the property of Tacna and Arica.

He was elected president of the General Assembly of the League of Nations from 1922 until 1923.

As executor of the will of businessman and philanthropist Federico Santa María Carrera, he founded Federico Santa María Technical University.

== Publications and legacy ==
He was a founding member of the Chilean Society of History and Geography. In 1926, fulfilling the testamentary mandate of Federico Santa María Carrera, he collaborated in founding the Federico Santa María Technical University, which bears the name of this Chilean businessman.

He died at the age of 63, on June 18, 1941, at his residence located in the Errázuriz Urmeneta Palace (Alameda 1656); he was attended by doctors Carlos Corvalán and Hernán Alessandri. The funeral was held on June 20, after a mass celebrated at Edwards' home by the then rector of the Catholic University of Chile, Monsignor Carlos Casanueva; he was later buried in the General Cemetery.

== See also ==
- María Edwards Mac Clure
- Edwards family
- El Mercurio

== Notes ==
Political offices
Preceded by Máximo del Campo	Minister of Foreign Affairs, Cult and Colonization; 1903	Succeeded by Rafael Sotomayor Gaete
Preceded by Luis Antonio Vergara	Minister of Foreign Affairs, Cult and Colonization; 1905	Succeeded by Federico Puga
Preceded by José Rafael Balmaceda	Minister of Foreign Affairs, Cult and Colonization; 1909–1910	Succeeded by Luis Izquierdo Fredes
Preceded by Ismael Tocornal	Minister of the Interior; 1910	Succeeded by Elías Fernández Albano
Diplomatic posts
Preceded by Herman Adriaan van Karnebeek	President of the League of Nations; 1922–1923	Succeeded by Cosme de la Torriente
