= The Sky, the Earth and the Rain =

- Film poster
- Directed by: José Luis Torres Leiva
- Starring: Julieta Figueroa; Angélica Riquelme
- Release date: 30 January 2008 (IFFR)
- Running time: 1h 50min
- Country: Chile
- Language: Spanish

The Sky, the Earth and the Rain (Spanish: El cielo, la tierra y la lluvia) is a 2008 Chilean-French-German drama film directed by José Luis Torres Leiva.

== Plot ==
The images of southern Chile depict a bleak rural landscape that appears to encroach upon any possibility of escape. Ana, Verónica, Marta, and Toro are four solitary individuals who endure their lives through routine and silence. They come together to share meals, walk along the beach, take a ferry, or simply keep each other company without the need for words. They seek love, intimacy, familial connections that don't exist, and spaces and time of their own, not only to escape their profound loneliness but also to discover themselves.

== Cast ==
- Julieta Figueroa
- Angélica Riquelme
- Mariana Muñoz
- Pablo Krögh
- Ignacio Agüero
- Maite Fernández
- Hugo Medina
- Chamila Rodríguez
- Isabel Quinteros
