= Tatia Rosenthal =

American film director (born 1971)

Tatia Rosenthal (Hebrew: טטיה רוזנטל; born April 4, 1971) is an animator and film director born in Tel Aviv, Israel. She served two years in the Israeli Defense Force, tried her hand at medical school and studied photography in Paris, before moving to New York City to attend the Tisch School of the Arts at New York University. Rosenthal currently works as a freelance director and animator in New York.

Rosenthal frequently collaborates with Israeli author Etgar Keret. As an NYU student she created the award-winning short film Crazy Glue (1998), which is based on an Etgar Keret story. In 2005 she directed A Buck's Worth, a stop-motion short film based on another Keret story. A Buck's Worth was used as proof of concept for the feature film $9.99. She received an Annie Award nomination for directing $9.99.
