= Summer (2011 film) =

2011 film

- Film poster
- Directed by: José Luis Torres Leiva
- Written by: José Luis Torres Leiva
- Produced by: Alicia Scherson
- Starring: Rosario Blefari
- Cinematography: Inti Briones
- Release date: 8 September 2011 (Venice)
- Running time: 95 minutes
- Country: Chile
- Language: Spanish

Summer (Spanish: Verano) is a 2011 Chilean drama film written and directed by José Luis Torres Leiva.

== Cast ==
- Rosario Bléfari as Isa
- Julieta Figueroa as Julieta
- Francisco Ossa as Francisco
