= John-Ross Edwards =

Jamaican footballer (born 1988)

Personal information
- Full name: John-Ross Christopher Edwards
- Date of birth: 27 January 1988 (age 38)
- Position: Midfielder

Senior career*
Years	Team	Apps	(Gls)
2007–2017	Harbour View	182	(21)

International career
2014	Jamaica	3	(0)
- * Club domestic league appearances and goals

John-Ross Christopher Edwards (born 27 January 1988) is a Jamaican former footballer who played for Harbour View and the Jamaican national team, as a midfielder.
