= Spencer Stuart =

American executive search and leadership consulting firm

- Industry: Professional services
- Products: Executive search and Consulting
- Revenue: 2022: US$1 Billion
- Website: spencerstuart.com

Spencer Stuart is an American executive search and leadership consulting firm based in Chicago, Illinois.

== History ==
It was founded in 1956. In 2009, the Wall Street Journal described the firm as the U.S. government's main resource for finding replacement executives for companies bailed out during the Great Recession.
