= Agustín Edwards Ossandón =

Chilean politician and businessman

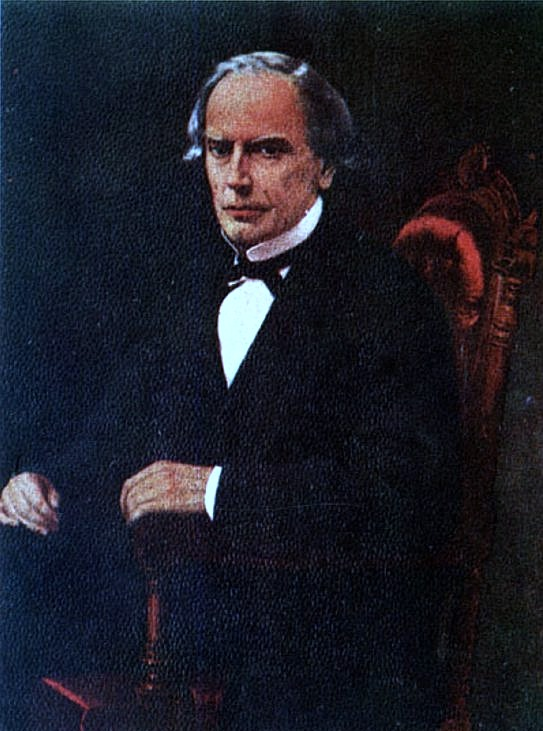

Senator of the Republic of Chile for Valparaíso
- In office 1 June 1876 – 2 January 1878
- Succeeded by: Pedro Nolasco Marcoleta Dávila

Deputy of the Republic of Chile for Valparaíso
- In office 1873–1876

Personal details
- Born: José Agustín de Dios Edwards Ossandón; 2 April 1815 La Serena, Chile
- Died: 2 January 1878 (aged 62) Limache, Chile
- Party: Independent politician, with National Party leanings
- Spouse: Juana Ross Edwards (m. 1851)
- Children: 8, including Agustín Edwards Ross
- Parents: George Edwards Brown (father); Isabel Ossandón Iribarren (mother)
- Relatives: Edwards family
- Occupation: Businessperson; mining entrepreneur; banker; politician
- Known for: Founder of the Bank of Valparaíso

José Agustín de Dios Edwards Ossandón (2 April 1815 – 2 January 1878) was a Chilean businessperson, mining entrepreneur, banker and politician. Edwards is known for founding the Bank of Valparaíso, and was one of the main forces behind the early railroad construction in South America.

== Early life ==
Agustín Edwards was born on 2 April 1815^{α} in La Serena, to Isabel Ossandón Iribarren and George Edwards Brown, a British-born Chilean doctor, businessperson, politician and founder of the Edwards family. His father migrated to Northern Chile in 1807 where he married.

== Career ==
From the age of 15, Edwards became involved in the family business. At the age of 19, he started to manage the silver smelting operations owned by his father in the cities of Vallenar and Freirina. In 1837, by the age of 22, he became independent and moved to the city of Copiapó, with a small capital he had managed to save.

In 1849 he founded the Bank of Valparaíso. He was an active promoter of the railroads in South America. He worked in the construction of the Copiapó-Caldera railway, the first Chilean railroad (and one of the first in Latin America) that was inaugurated on 25 December 1851. He then concentrated on the nitrate exploitation. He became president of the Nitrate Company, and began the studies for a railroad between Antofagasta and Bolivia.

By the 1860s Edwards was one of richest men in Chile, and was one of the country's most prominent 19th-century capitalists. Between 1870–1871, Edwards stockpiled vast quantities of Chilean copper, causing a 50% increase in the price of copper. In 1871, Edwards purchased the newspaper El Mercurio de Valparaíso.

== Politics ==
Edwards was elected to the lower house of parliament on 1861, and then again in 1873. In 1876, he was elected a Senator for Valparaíso, a position he held until his death.

== Personal life ==
In 1851, Edwards married his niece Juana Ross Edwards, a philanthropist. The couple had eight children, including the politician and businessperson Agustín Edwards Ross.

On 2 January 1878, Edwards died aged 62 in Limache.

== Notes ==
^α Sometimes cited as 20 May 1815.
