= Stanton Chase =

Executive search and consulting firm

- Formerly: Stanton Chase International
- Industry: Professional services
- Founded: 1990; 36 years ago
- Number of locations: 76 offices in 45 countries
- Products: Executive search
- Website: stantonchase.com

Stanton Chase is a retained executive search and consulting firm established in 1990 with more than 76 offices in 45 countries. The firm is organised around focused industry and functional practice groups. Consultants across these groups are typically drawn from operational backgrounds in the sectors they serve, rather than from careers exclusively in recruitment.

== History ==
Stanton Chase was founded in 1990 by partners who owned executive search firms in Amsterdam, Los Angeles, Baltimore, and London. The firm expanded and established a global presence, opening offices in Europe, Asia, North and South America, and Africa.

In 2024, the firm opened new offices in Montreal, Canada and Lima, Peru, and expanded its United States presence with a new office in Huntsville, Alabama.

In January 2025, Çağrı Alkaya, Managing Partner of Stanton Chase London and former Global Vice Chair, Regions, was elected Global Chair of the Board, succeeding Kristof Reynvoet. Panos Manolopoulos, Managing Partner of Stanton Chase Dubai and Greater China, assumed the Global Vice Chair, Regions role vacated by Alkaya.

In January 2026, the firm opened offices in Dublin, Ireland and Vilnius, Lithuania, extending its European presence into the Irish and Baltic markets respectively.

== Global Presence ==
Among the key locations in Stanton Chase's network are Washington D.C., Frankfurt, Dubai, Singapore, Vienna, Stuttgart, Kuala Lumpur, Sydney, Lisbon, Belgrade, Sofia, and Tokyo. Other notable regional offices include Miami, Mexico City, and São Paulo in the Americas, Paris and Athens in Europe, Shanghai and Mumbai in Asia-Pacific, and Lagos and Johannesburg in Africa. Recent additions to the network include Montreal, Canada, Lima, Peru, Huntsville, Alabama, Dublin, Ireland, and Vilnius, Lithuania.

== Services ==
Stanton Chase provides retained executive search and leadership advisory services across industries including technology, healthcare, financial services, energy, consumer goods, and life sciences. The firm's core service lines are executive search, executive assessment, board services, succession planning, and executive onboarding. All executive search engagements at Stanton Chase are conducted under its trademarked Search+® methodology, a proprietary process the firm registered with the United States Patent and Trademark Office in 2024 (see Notable Firsts).

== Recognition ==
- In 2015, Corporate Vision Magazine awarded Stanton Chase as the Best Global Senior Executive Search Firm & Innovator for Diversity Recruitment.
- In 2016, Corporate Vision Magazine awarded Stanton Chase as the Top U.S. Search Firm for Excellence in Customer Satisfaction.
- The company's directors and consultants have also received awards, such as the Association of Executive Search Consultants' Future of the Profession Award in 2017 and 2023.
- In 2026, Stanton Chase was ranked 14th on Forbes' America's Best Executive Recruiting Firms list, an annual ranking produced in partnership with Statista based on independent surveys of recruiters, HR managers, hiring managers, and candidates.

== Notable Firsts ==
In 2016, Stanton Chase was the only executive search firm to join the White House Equal Pay Pledge in the United States.

In 2018, Stanton Chase became one of the first executive search firms in the world to accept cryptocurrency as payment for services.

In 2024, Stanton Chase became the first executive search firm in the world to trademark its executive search methodology. The firm's proprietary process, Search+®, was filed as a service mark with the United States Patent and Trademark Office on December 1, 2023 and registered on October 22, 2024, under Registration Number 7544198 (Serial Number 98294449).

== Affiliations ==
Stanton Chase is a member of the Association of Executive Search Consultants (AESC), which sets industry standards for ethical codes of conduct and practice standards.

Stanton Chase is also a member of the 30% Club, which aims to increase the number of women on boards by taking voluntary steps.

Additionally, Stanton Chase has partnerships with Nasdaq Boardvantage, the Centre for Board Excellence (CBE), and Hofstede Insights.

The firm is also a member of SEMI, the global industry association for the electronics manufacturing and design supply chain.

In June 2025, Stanton Chase entered a strategic partnership with the Iacocca Institute at Lehigh University, focused on leadership development, career pathways, and global citizenship programming for the Lehigh University and Iacocca Institute communities.

== Corporate and Social Responsibility Initiatives ==
Stanton Chase engages in corporate and social responsibility initiatives. Some of these initiatives include:

- Stanton Chase Amsterdam undertakes an annual pro bono search for an international nonprofit, including searches conducted for War Child Netherlands.
- Stanton Chase Brussels is dedicated to planting 100 trees for every search they complete.
- Stanton Chase Boston supports The Sato Project, which rescues abused dogs in Puerto Rico and provides them with foster care and medical attention in the United States.

Stanton Chase publishes an annual ESG Progress Report documenting its environmental, social, and governance commitments and performance across its global network. According to the 2023 report, women make up 55% of Stanton Chase's global workforce, and 62% of new hires that year were women. Of the executives placed in client companies during the same period, 24% were women, including 24% of CEO and board-level appointments. The 2023 report also notes that 11% of Stanton Chase's overall workforce identifies as diverse beyond gender, spanning socioeconomic background, cultural identity, religion, neurodiversity, and sexual orientation. Individual offices have adopted environmental measures including paperless operations, use of FSC-certified paper, and waste-reduction programmes. The Sydney offices occupy buildings with a 6 Star Green Star Performance rating and Platinum WELL Core and Shell Certification. Stanton Chase Belgrade received ESG certification from PCC Cert Balkan in December 2023.

== Publications ==
Stanton Chase publishes global research on C-suite trends, leadership development, and business strategy. Publications include the COVID-19 Corporate Response Survey Report, the 2023 Survey Report on Executive Upskilling for Next-Gen Directorship, The Growing Need to Prioritize Talent in the Private Equity Sector (2025), examining leadership and succession challenges in private equity, and Readiness 2030: Leadership Strategies for Global Businesses in the EuroDome (2025), a white paper examining the leadership and talent implications of Europe's Readiness 2030 defence spending programme.

The firm also runs a quarterly Executive Survey Panel that polls C-suite executives and board members across its global network. The Q1 2026 report, AI in the C-Suite: Insights from 214 Global Executives, surveyed 214 executives across nine industries and four regions on AI adoption, returns on investment, workforce transition, and talent strategy. The report found that 77% of organizations had not moved AI beyond experimentation, 65% could not show measurable financial returns from their AI investments, 43% had not communicated to employees how AI would affect their jobs, and 62% expected between 6% and 30% of their workforce to need to exit or transition within five years.

Additionally, the firm's semiconductor practice group has contributed research to third-party industry publications. These include a white paper on semiconductor supply chain resilience published by SEMI, the global electronics manufacturing industry association, and an analysis of leadership challenges in the photonics sector published in Semiconductor Engineering.
