= José Luis Torres Leiva =

Chilean film director (born 1975)

- Born: José Luis Torres Leiva; April 2, 1975 (age 51); Santiago de Chile
- Education: Universidad UNIACC
- Occupations: filmmaker, editor
- Years active: 2003–present

José Luis Torres Leiva (born April 2, 1975, in Chile) is a film director, editor, and screenwriter. José Luis Torres Leiva won the FIPRESCI Prize in Rotterdam with his first feature, The Sky, the Earth and the Rain (2008). His second feature, Summer (2011), premiered in the Orizzonti section in Venice. The Wind Knows I'm Coming Back Home participated in San Sebastian's Zabaltegi section in 2016, returning to the same section in 2017 (also the year he was president of the International Film Students Meeting jury) with the short El sueño de Ana.

== Filmography ==
- When Clouds Hide the Shadow (2024)
- Vendrá la muerte y tendrá tus ojos (2019)
- Sobre cosas que me han pasado (2018)
- El sueño de Ana (2017)
- Los soñadores (2016)
- El viento sabe que vuelvo a casa (2016)
- Qué historia es ésta y cuál es su final (2013)
- El brazo de Sandow (2013)
- 11 habitaciones en Antártica (2013)
- Ver y escuchar (2013)
- Summer (2011)
- Tres semanas después (2010)
- Primer día de invierno (2009)
- Trance 1-10 (2008)
- The Sky, the Earth and the Rain (2008)
- El tiempo que se queda (2007)
- Obreras saliendo de la fábrica (2005)
- Ningún Lugar en Ninguna Parte (2004)

== Awards ==
- Cartagena Film Festival Golden India Catalina Award: El viento sabe que vuelvo a casa (2016)
- Best Film, Olhar de Cinema, Brasil for El viento sabe que vuelvo a casa (2016)
- Mexico City International Contemporary Film Festival Cinemex Award for Best Narrative Film: El cielo, la tierra, y la lluvia (2008)
- Rotterdam International Film Festival FIPRESCI Prize: El cielo, la tierra, y la lluvia (2008)
- Buenos Aires Film Festival Cinema of the Future Award: El tiempo que se queda (2007)
- Best International Short Film Zinebi Bilbao Film Festival for "Obreras saliendo de la fábrica", 2005
- Best International Short Film Chicago Int. Film Festival for "Obreras saliendo de la fábrica", 2005
- Best Short Film, Drama International Short Film Festival, Greece, for "Obreras saliendo de la fábrica", 2005
