= George Edwards Brown =

British-born Chilean physician, businessman and politician (1779-1848)

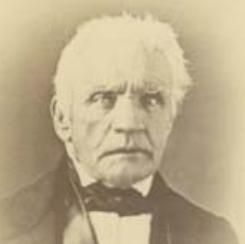
- Born: 27 November 1779; London, Kingdom of Great Britain (present-day UK)
- Died: 5 March 1848 (aged 68); La Serena, Chile
- Other name: Jorge Edwards Brown
- Citizenship: Chilean (1818 onwards)
- Education: Royal College of Physicians
- Occupations: Military surgeon; physician; mining entrepreneur; businessperson; politician
- Spouse(s): Isabel Ossandón Iribarren (m. 1807; died 1830) Buenaventura Argandoña Subercaseaux (m. 1834; died 1844)
- Children: 8, including Agustín Edwards Ossandón
- Family: Edwards family

Deputy for Huasco
- In office 1822–1823

Deputy for Andacollo
- In office 1825–1826

Member of Parliament for Freirina
- In office 1826–1827

Deputy for Coquimbo
- In office 1831–1831

Member of Parliament for Vallenar
- In office 1834–1837

George "Jorge" Edwards Brown (27 November 1779 – March 5, 1848) was a British-born Chilean military surgeon, medical doctor, mining entrepreneur, businessperson and politician, known for being the founder and patriarch of the Edwards family in Chile.

Initially a sailor and surgeon from England, he deserted his own ship to live in Chile where he then worked as a surgeon and developed mines. A supporter of the patriot cause during the Chilean War of Independence, he served as chief physician-surgeon of the United Restoration Army, and was granted Chilean citizenship in 1818 for his services to the independence cause. He then went on to serve in several political posts.

== Early life and education ==
George Edwards was born on 27 November 1779 in London to John Edwards and Elizabeth Brown. On 2 January 1780, Edwards was christened at St Luke's church in Islington.

Edwards was educated at Eton College, and later attended the Royal College of Physicians.

== In Chile ==
Having sailed from a young age in British ships engaged in trade and privateering or looting, Edwards visited Chile for the first time in 1797. In 1803, he enlisted as a surgeon in the British raider Blackhouse or Bacar, which was dedicated to looting and plundering ships and ports in the Spanish colonies in South America. In 1807, Edwards arrived in Chile aboard Bacar which anchored in the bay of Coquimbo and assaulted the undefended city.

During the sack of Coquimbo, Jorge Edwards entered the house of Diego de Ossandón to loot, but he found his daughter, Isabel de Ossandón, who he fell in love with immediately. He decided to desert the ship and ask for shelter in the house of Diego Ossandón. Family tradition says that when Edwards did not return to the British ship, they spent three days looking through all the houses in the city for him. Edwards hid for three days, hiding in a barrel of wine from his former shipmates. On the third day Spanish reinforcements arrived, forcing the British to retreat from the city to continue their raids to the north. Once the Spanish authorities were aware of Edwards' presence in La Serena, he was arrested and sent to Callao, where he was detained.

Once released he returned to La Serena in 1805, where he was baptized into the Catholic faith. The baptism certificate recognizes that his parents are Juan Eduardos (John Edwards) and Isabel Pardo (Elizabeth Brown), Spanish forms of their Welsh and English names respectively.

After that he worked as a doctor and surgeon for some years. He then became active in the mining business, and helped discover silver in Arqueros. He also developed mines in Copiapó and Huasco.

His distinctly anti-Spanish feelings made him a supporter of the patriot cause during the Chilean War of Independence, making donations to build the fleet for the liberation of Peru, commanded by a fellow Brit, Lord Thomas Cochrane. After the Battle of Chacabuco, he was appointed chief physician-surgeon of the United Restoration Army. On 21 July 1818, Edwards was granted Chilean citizenship by Bernardo O'Higgins for his services to the Independence cause.

He served as Deputy for Huasco between 1822 and 1823, Deputy for Andacollo between 1825 and 1826, Deputy for Freirina between 1826 and 1828, Deputy for Coquimbo in 1831, and Proprietary Deputy for Vallenar between 1834 and 1837.

== Personal life ==
In 1807, Edwards married Isabel Ossandón Iribarren (1784-1830), an heiress to the Peñuelas estate, with whom he had eight children. Edwards and Ossandón's children included Agustín Edwards Ossandón and Joaquín Edwards Ossandón.

Edwards married Buenaventura Argandoña Subercaseaux (1804–1844), a landowner and benefactor of Coquimbo Province, in 1834.

Edwards died in La Serena, Chile on 5 March 1848, aged 68.

== See also ==
- Edwards family
