= Te Rapa Nui =

Newspaper of Easter Island

Te Rapa Nui is a newspaper published on Rapa Nui (Easter Island). According to the newspaper’s own publication, it began operating in 1996 and was the island’s first newspaper. Journalist Juan Pedro Soler Bolt, husband of the former provincial governor Melania Carolina Hotu Hey, was associated with the newspaper by at least 1999.
