= Russell Reynolds Associates =

American management consulting firm

- Industry: Management consulting
- Founded: New York, New York (1969; 57 years ago)
- Headquarters: New York, New York, United States
- Number of locations: 47 offices in 26 countries
- Key people: Constantine Alexandrakis (CEO)
- Services: Executive Search, Board & CEO Advisory Services, Culture Advisory, Inclusion & Culture, Assessment, Family Business, Succession planning and Digital Transformation
- Website: russellreynolds.com

Russell Reynolds Associates (RRA) is an American management consulting firm based in New York. Established in 1969, the firm assists international and domestic companies develop leaders, assess business processes, and recruit new executives. It provides leadership advisory and executive recruiting services.

== History ==
The firm was established in 1969 by Russell S. Reynolds, Jr. in New York City. By 1977, it had become one of the so-called "Big Six" executive search firms in the United States. By 2025, RRA has expanded to 47 offices across 25 countries. In June 2016, Houston Mayor Sylvester Turner retained Russell Reynolds Associates to help find the city’s next police and fire chiefs. In November, the Mayor named Art Acevedo to be Houston's first Latino chief of police. Also named was Fire Chief Samuel Peña, the city's second Latino fire chief.

In 2016, Russell Reyolds Associates formed a partnership with Hogan Assessments. In April 2017, Fairfield University retained RRA to find a new president when Rev. Jeffrey Von Arx, who held the position for 12 years, announced his reassignment. That same month, Austin City Council retained Russell Reynolds Associates to work with a task force to find a new city manager. Also in April, the firm was retained by battery maker Energizer Holdings to identify a permanent CFO. The firm also acquired three leadership and assessment consultancies includes Nvolv, Kilberry, and Savage Partners.

In December 2018, the firm was retained by Kent State University to identify a new president for the university. In the following year, it became a signatory to the United Nations Global Compact. Later in 2021, the firm named Constantine Alexandrakis as their new CEO, who had previously been the head of the Americas.
