= Rosenzweig & Company =

Canadian recruitment firm

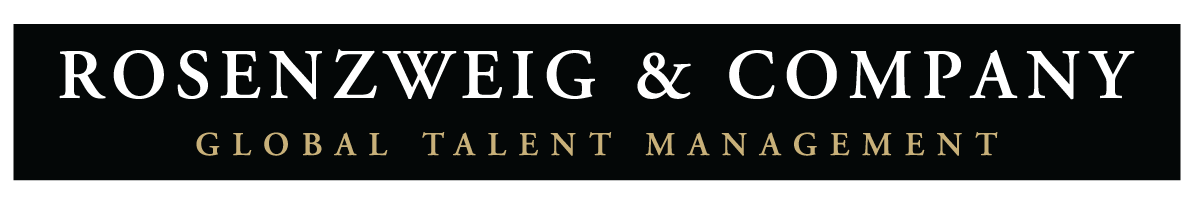
- Company type: Private
- Industry: Executive Search
- Founded: Toronto, Ontario, Canada
- Founder: Jay Rosenzweig
- Headquarters: Toronto, Canada
- Website: rosenzweigco.com

Rosenzweig & Company is a Canadian executive recruitment firm, which publishes the annual Rosenzweig Report on Women at the Top Levels of Corporate Canada. The company is led by founder and CEO, Jay Rosenzweig.

== History ==
Founded in 2004 by Canadian investor Jay Rosenzweig, Rosenzweig & Company is a leading global recruitment-search firm headquartered in Toronto with reach in all key business centers including New York, Montreal, Calgary, San Francisco, Los Angeles, Hong Kong, and Mumbai. Members of the firm have been interviewed on television and radio as well as by The Guardian, The New York Times, The National Post, and The Globe and Mail on issues of diversity, executive team building and the future of technology. Hyperloop Transportation Technologies and CryptoSlam are among the company's clients.

Following the Russian invasion of Ukraine in 2022, Rosenzweig met with Ukrainian politician Andriy Yermak to discuss support for the country. Rosenzweig was an Executive Producer of the Emmy-nominated film, Superpower.

=== The Rosenzweig Report ===
The firm publishes the annual Rosenzweig Report on Women at the Top Levels of Corporate Canada, first published in 2006. The Rosenzweig Report analyzes the prevalence of female executives at the 100 largest publicly traded companies in the country. The publication has been referenced in the annual report of the Status of Women Canada, a federal government organization devoted to the advancement of women in Canadian life, in 2008 and 2009, and has been cited in news coverage around the world. The Rosenzweig Report has had contributions from Jesse Draper, Karena Evans, Katie Taylor, Adam Grant, Dikembe Mutombo, and Chrystia Freeland. Based on data from the Rosenzweig Report, Digital Trends detailed gender disparity in the workplace and how to address it.

Sheryl Sandberg, Van Jones, Zainab Salbi, Andrew Yang, Chloe Flower, and Jason Flom contributed to the wide-ranging 2019 report. Inno & Tech Today pointed to the Rosenzweig Report to conclude that "discrimination is alive and well" and that the representation gap between men and women in the technology industry remained wide.

== See also ==
- Executive search
