= Diario Financiero =

Newspaper

- Format: Tabloid
- Founded: 25 October 1988; 37 years ago
- Political alignment: Liberalism; Conservative liberalism
- Headquarters: Las Condes, Santiago, Chile
- Country: Chile
- Circulation: 16,150 (Print); 4,000 (Digital) (as of 2018)
- Website: www.df.cl

Diario Financiero is a Chilean economic newspaper founded by a group of journalists from the Economy and Business Corps of El Mercurio on October 25, 1988. It is currently controlled by the Claro Group. The tabloid has been using the orange paper that distinguishes economic media in the world since its June 19, 1989 edition, such as the Financial Times and Il Sole 24 ORE. Its main competence is the "Economy and Business" body of El Mercurio, Pulso of the Copesa and Estrategia.

== History ==
The idea of creating a newspaper specialized in finance arises in mid-1988 from the journalist René Jáuregui, then in Economy and Business of El Mercurio, who in a conversation at the house of Osvaldo Cifuentes, raises the idea to Enrique Contreras and Roberto Meza .1 She consisted of launching a page distributed in the financial district of Santiago, something similar to how Ámbito Financiero had begun in Argentina, but in the days Mario Vackflores, partner of Meza in a communications agency, stated that it should be a daily. Jáuregui invited the businessman Pedro Lizana to participate in the business who became the first president of Ediciones Financieras S.A.

The company was constituted with an initial capital of 30 million pesos divided into three thousand registered shares of the same series, without nominal value and of equal value each, which was paid with 12 million pesos corresponding to 1,200 subscribed and paid shares and 18 million pesos corresponding to 1,800 million that would be issued, subscribed and paid in three years. The shares were subscribed by six partners: Pedro Lizana Greve, President; Mario Vackflores, General Manager; Roberto Meza Antognoni, Director; René Jáuregui, General Editor; Osvaldo Cifuentes Visconti and Enrique Contreras, Editors.

The registered name of the new newspaper was El Diario Financiero, but by opposition presented by Víctor Manuel Ojeda Méndez, director of the newspaper Estrategia and the magazine Gestión, before the Ministry of Economy, the generic newspaper El Diario had to be circulated, adding three concepts Under it: Finance, Economy, Development1. On April 4, 2003, El Diario is officially called Diario Financiero after reaching an agreement to purchase the brand.

In 1996, he joined Ricardo Claro as partner in Ediciones Chiloé, which is the controller of Ediciones Financieras, the Spanish group RECOLETOS, a subsidiary at the time of Pearson (editor of the Financial Times), owner of the Spanish newspaper Expansión. This group had a delegated director (a kind of newspaper boss, since Chilean legislation does not allow a foreigner to be a newspaper director), which fell to Carmelo Calvo.

The arrival of the Spanish group allowed a boost in the editorial part by having key agreements such as translation and exclusive rights over articles from the Financial Times, BusinessWeek, Economist Intelligence Unit and Expansion itself.

The Spanish expedition continued until August 2005, when Recoletos sells its participation in Diario Financiero to Cristalerias Chile, owned by the Claro group, for three million dollars (2.5 million euros), according to the Spanish group that quoted at this point in the Madrid Stock Exchange. With this, the Claro group increased its participation in Ediciones Financieras SA, controller of Diario Financiero, to 73.31%, leaving the rest of the property in the hands of well-known Chilean entrepreneurs such as Roberto Izquierdo Menéndez (Alimar companies), Andrés Navarro ( Sonda) and José Luis Del Río (Derco / Falabella).

In December 2016, the controllers decide to merge Ediciones Financieras S.A. with Ediciones e Impresos S.A., controller of the Capital, Paparazzi and Ed magazines, the first remaining as a continuator of both operations.

His first office was in the center of Santiago, in Compañía 1048. In 1995 he moved to the commune of Providencia, to Sweden 659. Then his offices were concentrated in the Barrio El Golf in San Crescente 81, in the commune of Las Condes, until the beginning of 2011, when the newspaper moved its offices to Apoquindo 3885, and later in 2017, be located in the Fundadores Building, Badajoz No. 45, 10th floor, in the same commune, where it shares facilities with Capital and ED magazines, linked to Ediciones Financieras SA.
