= Agustín Edwards Ross =

Chilean businessman and politician

Agustín Edwards Ross (February 17, 1852, Valparaíso – November 1, 1897) was a Chilean businessman and politician. Edwards served as the President of the Senate of Chile from 1893 through 1895. He was the son of Agustín Edwards Ossandón and Juana Ross Edwards.

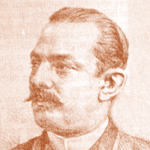
Agustín Edwards Ross

== See also ==
- Edwards family
