= The Santiago Times =

Digital newspaper published in Santiago, Chile

- Type: Daily newspaper
- Format: Online
- Founded: 1990
- Language: English
- Headquarters: Santiago, Chile
- Website: www.santiagotimes.cl

The Santiago Times was a digital daily newspaper published in Santiago, Chile that reported news in Chile and other parts of Latin America. It was part of The Chilean Information Project (CHIP) reporting on environmental, social and economic issues within Chile. The newspaper's focus was environmental and social issues, giving particular attention to reporting on the Mapuche struggle and environmental concerns within Chile. The publication provides English and Spanish language media content for various organizations in Chile.

The Santiago Times was founded in 1990 as a personal hobby of its founder, Steve Anderson. It incorporated in 1995 and ceased publishing in November 2014. Both its Twitter and Facebook pages also ceased publishing in November 2014.

After a hiatus of nearly two years, the website has come back online with a new look and a web articles dated July 7, 2016 where they are asking for contributors.
