= El Mercurio =

Chilean newspaper

Coordinates: 33°22′58″S 70°35′36″W

- Front page of the main body of the newspaper's 11 September 2013 edition
- Type: Daily newspaper
- Format: Broadsheet
- Owner: Cristián Edwards del Río
- Editor: Carlos Schaerer
- Founded: 12 September 1827 (Valparaíso ed.); 1 June 1900 (Santiago ed.)
- Political alignment: Right-wing, conservative, liberal conservative, economic liberalism
- Headquarters: Avda. Santa María 5542; Vitacura, Chile
- Website: www.emol.com; www.elmercurio.com (print)

El Mercurio (known online as El Mercurio On-Line, EMOL) is a Chilean newspaper with editions in Valparaíso and Santiago. El Mercurio is owned by El Mercurio S.A.P. (Sociedad Anónima Periodística 'joint stock news company'), which operates a network of 19 regional dailies and 32 radio stations across the country.

== History ==
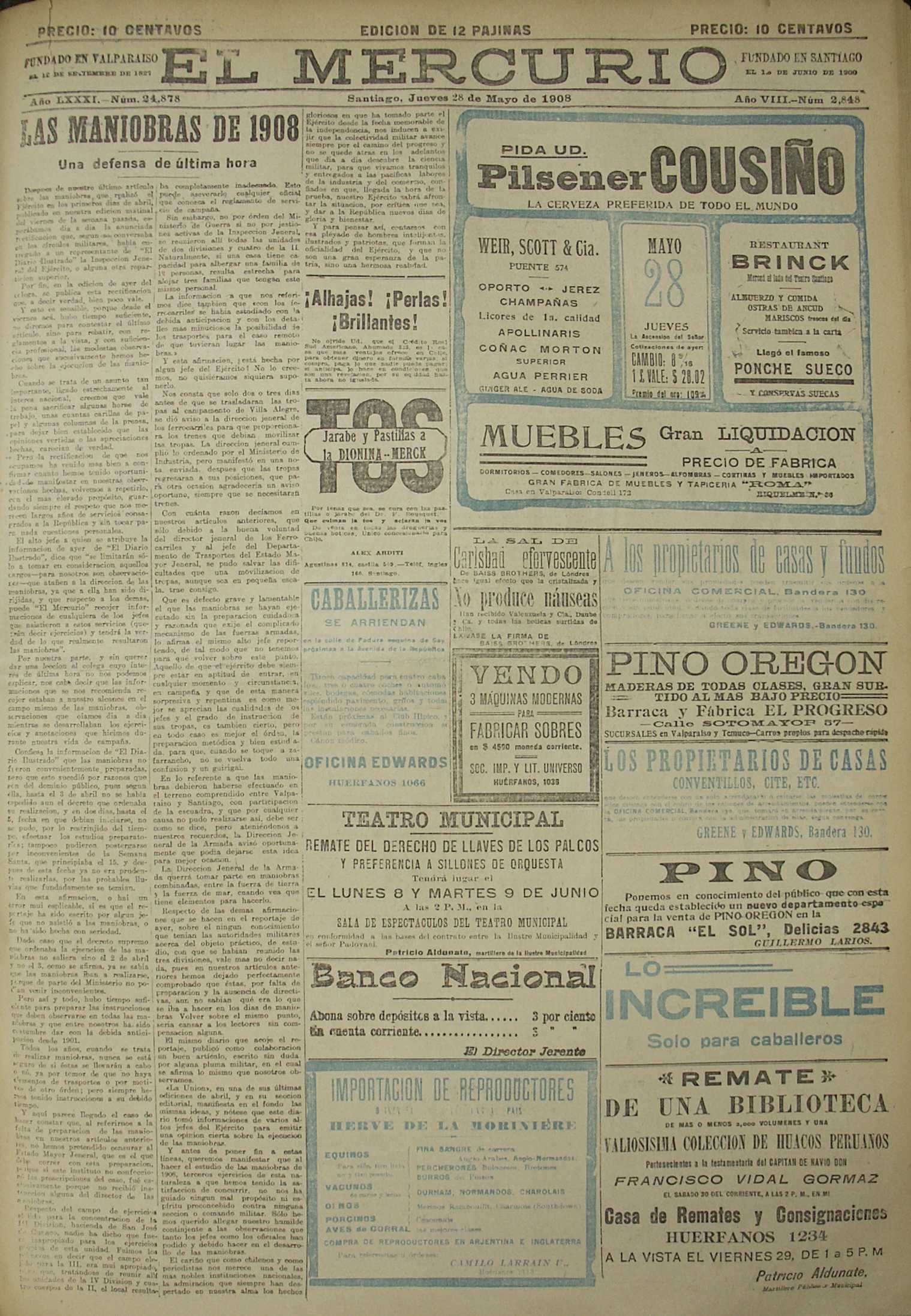
Main page of El Mercurio's 28 May 1908 edition (number 24,878)

The Valparaíso edition of El Mercurio was founded by Pedro Félix Vicuña (Benjamín Vicuña Mackenna's father) on 12 September 1827, and was later acquired by Agustín Edwards Ross in 1880. The Santiago edition was founded by Agustín Edwards Mac Clure, son of Edwards Ross, on 1 June 1900. In 1942 Edwards Mac Clure died and his son Agustín Edwards Budge took over as president. When Edwards Budge died in 1956, his son, Agustín Edwards Eastman, took control of the company. Edwards Eastman died in 2017, leaving the company in hands of his son Cristián Edwards del río.

During the 1950s, El Mercurio planned to introduce television into Chile, applying for licenses in Santiago and Valparaíso, expected to launch by 1958.

El Mercurio SAP owns the Chilean afternoon daily newspaper La Segunda, which published news with sensationalist and confrontational language that was considered inappropriate for El Mercurio.

=== CIA funding ===
El Mercurio received funds from the CIA in the early 1970s to undermine the Socialist government of Salvador Allende, acting as a mouthpiece for anti-Allende propaganda.

Declassified documents that detail US interventions in Chile revealed the paper's role, and the extent of the paper's cooperation with the CIA:

"Throughout the 1960s, the CIA poured funds into Chile's largest—and staunchly right-wing—newspaper, El Mercurio, putting reporters and editors on the payroll, writing articles and columns for placement and providing additional funds for operating expenses. After the paper's owner, Agustín Edwards came to Washington in September 1970 to lobby Nixon for action against Allende, the CIA used El Mercurio as a key outlet for a massive propaganda campaign as part of Track I and Track II. Throughout Allende's aborted tenure, the paper continued an unyielding campaign, running countless virulent, inflammatory articles and editorials exhorting opposition against—and at times even calling for the overthrow of—the Popular Unity government. " (p. 91-92)

Support reached to the highest levels of the US government. When the paper requested significant funds for covert support in September 1971, "...in a rare example of presidential micromanagement of a covert operation, Nixon personally authorized the $700,000—and more if necessary—in covert funds to El Mercurio." (p. 93)

=== Role in 1973 coup d'état ===
The paper played "a significant role in setting the stage for the military coup" which took place on 11 September 1973, bringing General Augusto Pinochet to power. It mobilised opponents of President Salvador Allende and the gremialismo movement to be active in destabilisation from the street, while also advocating the neoliberal policies of the yet-to-come Chicago Boys.

=== 1988 to the present ===
Former journalists of El Mercurio have been crucial in the creation of various new newspapers in Chile including Diario Financiero in 1988, El Líbero in 2014, and Ex-Ante in 2020.

El Mercurio's building in Valparaíso was set on fire by protesters in October 2019 during the 2019 Chilean protests sparked by rise in transportation cost.

== See also ==
- El Mercurio de Valparaíso
- Project FUBELT
- List of newspapers in Chile
