= El Mercurio de Valparaíso =

Chilean newspaper

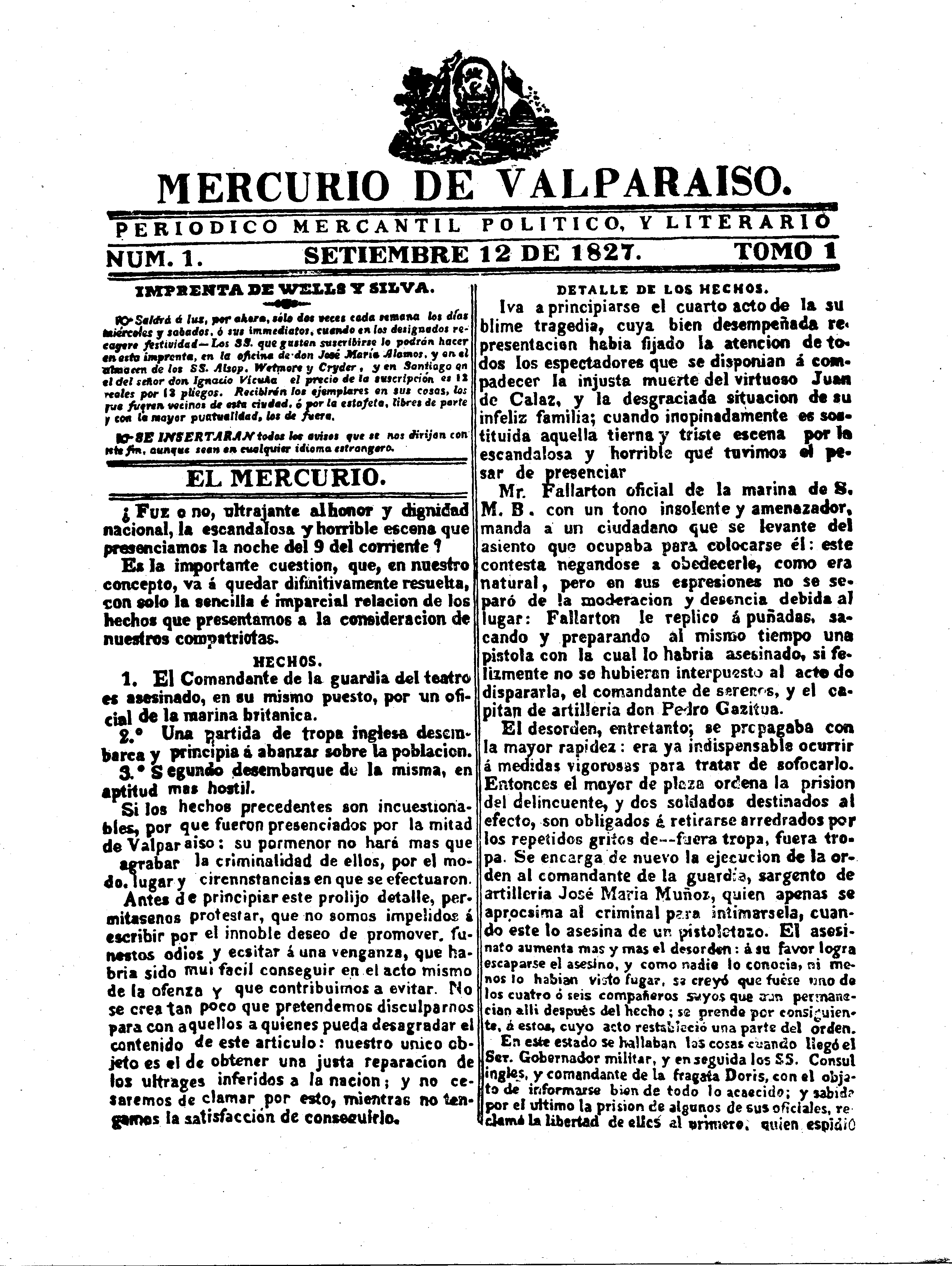
First number of El Mercurio de Valparaíso, dated 12 September 1827

El Mercurio de Valparaíso (Spanish pronunciation: [el meɾˈkuɾjo ðe βalpaɾaˈiso]) is the oldest continuously circulating periodical, published under the same name, in the Spanish language. It was founded on September 12, 1827. It is based in Valparaíso, Chile.

== See also ==
- El Mercurio
