= Executive search =

Specialized recruitment service

Executive search (informally often referred to as headhunting) is a specialized recruitment service where organizations pay firms to actively seek out and recruit highly qualified candidates for senior-level and executive jobs across the public and private sectors, as well as non-profit organizations (e.g., President, Vice-president, CEO, and non-executive-directors).

Headhunters may also seek out and recruit other highly specialized and/or skilled positions in organizations for which there is strong competition in the job market for the top talent, such as senior data analysts or computer programmers.

The method usually involves commissioning a third-party organization, typically an executive search firm, but potentially a standalone consultant or consulting firm, to research the availability of suitable qualified candidates working for competitors or related businesses or organizations. Having identified a shortlist of qualified candidates who match the client's requirements, the executive search firm may act as an intermediary to contact the individual(s) and see if they might be interested in moving to a new employer. The executive search firm may also carry out initial screening of the candidate, negotiations on remuneration and benefits, and preparing the employment contract.

In some markets, there has been a move towards using executive search for lower-level positions, driven by the fact that there are fewer candidates for some positions, and in some cases increasing levels of demand.

== Executive search firms ==
An executive search firm is a type of professional service firm that specializes in recruiting executives and other senior personnel for their client companies in various industries. Executive search agents/professionals typically have a wide range of personal contacts in their industry or field of specialty; detailed, specific knowledge of the area; and typically operate at the most senior level of executive positions. Executive search professionals are also involved throughout the hiring process, conducting detailed interviews and presenting candidates to clients selectively, when they feel the candidate meets all stated requirements and would fit into the culture of the hiring firm. Executive search firms typically have long-lasting relationships with clients spanning many years, and in such cases the suitability of candidates is paramount.

When corporate entities elect to use an outside executive search firm, it is usually because they lack the internal research resources, professional networks, or evaluative skills to properly recruit for themselves. Using an outside firm also allows the corporate entity the freedom of recruiting from competitors without doing so directly, and the ability to choose among candidates that would not be available through internal or passive sourcing methodologies. Executive search firms are national and international. Many specialize in a particular business industry sector. The contractual relationship between client and executive search firm falls into two broad categories: contingent and retained. Contingent recruiters are paid only upon the successful completion of the "search assignment." Retained recruiters are paid for the process, typically earning a recruiting fee in three stages based on the anticipated compensation of the executive.

In 1959 the Association of Executive Search and Leadership Consultants (AESC) emerged to set the standards of quality and ethics for the executive search consulting trade. AESC Members range in size from large global firms and networks to boutique firms spanning more than 70 countries.

== Types of executive search ==
=== Retained search ===
High-end executive search firms often charge a retainer to perform a search for a corporate officer or other senior executive position. Retained recruiters work for the organizations that are their clients, not for job candidates seeking employment. In some countries, such as the UK, recruiters are not legally permitted to charge candidates.

=== Contingent search ===
Contingent search firms are remunerated only upon the successful completion of the search—typically when the candidate accepts the position, much like traditional recruitment. These recruiters may earn from 20% to 35% of the candidate's first-year base salary or total remuneration as a hiring fee; the fee may also be calculated to include the candidate's (that is, the successful hire's) median or expected first-year bonus payout. In any case, the fee is (as always) paid by the hiring company, not the candidate/hire.

=== Pros and cons ===
Clients (companies seeking to hire) often tend to work with contingent search firms when filling mid-level positions. As contingent search firms generally rely heavily on their contacts, and seldom work on an exclusive basis, it is not rare for a client to work with a large number of contingent recruiters on the same search at the same time, in order to maximize the volume of candidate (job seeker) resumes they receive. Moreover, contingent search firms often work with clients on higher percentage fee basis, relative to retained search firms as they shoulder more risk and the process is often more consultative. For senior level roles, clients often prefer to work with firms who have performed well in the past for them and usually will end up in the hands of a retained recruiter. By working exclusively with one firm on such searches, the client generally develops a much deeper relationship with the recruiter, and receives a much higher level of service. With all methods, clients rely on search professionals to provide not just resumes, but also consultative information about the market in general, as well as additional tools such as psychometric profiling during the interview process.

== Regulation and standards ==
There is little regulation or oversight of the executive search industry globally.

In the United Kingdom there is a Standard voluntary code of conduct for executive search firms, which was launched following the "Davies Review" in 2011. It has been progressively refined and enhanced over time. The "code" has 11 provisions which firms who voluntarily sign up to the code are expected to adhere to.

== See also ==
- Employment agency
- List of executive search firms
- Onboarding
- Personnel selection
- Recruitment
