= Lenka Franulic Award =

Chilean women's journalism award

- Named for Lenka Franulic
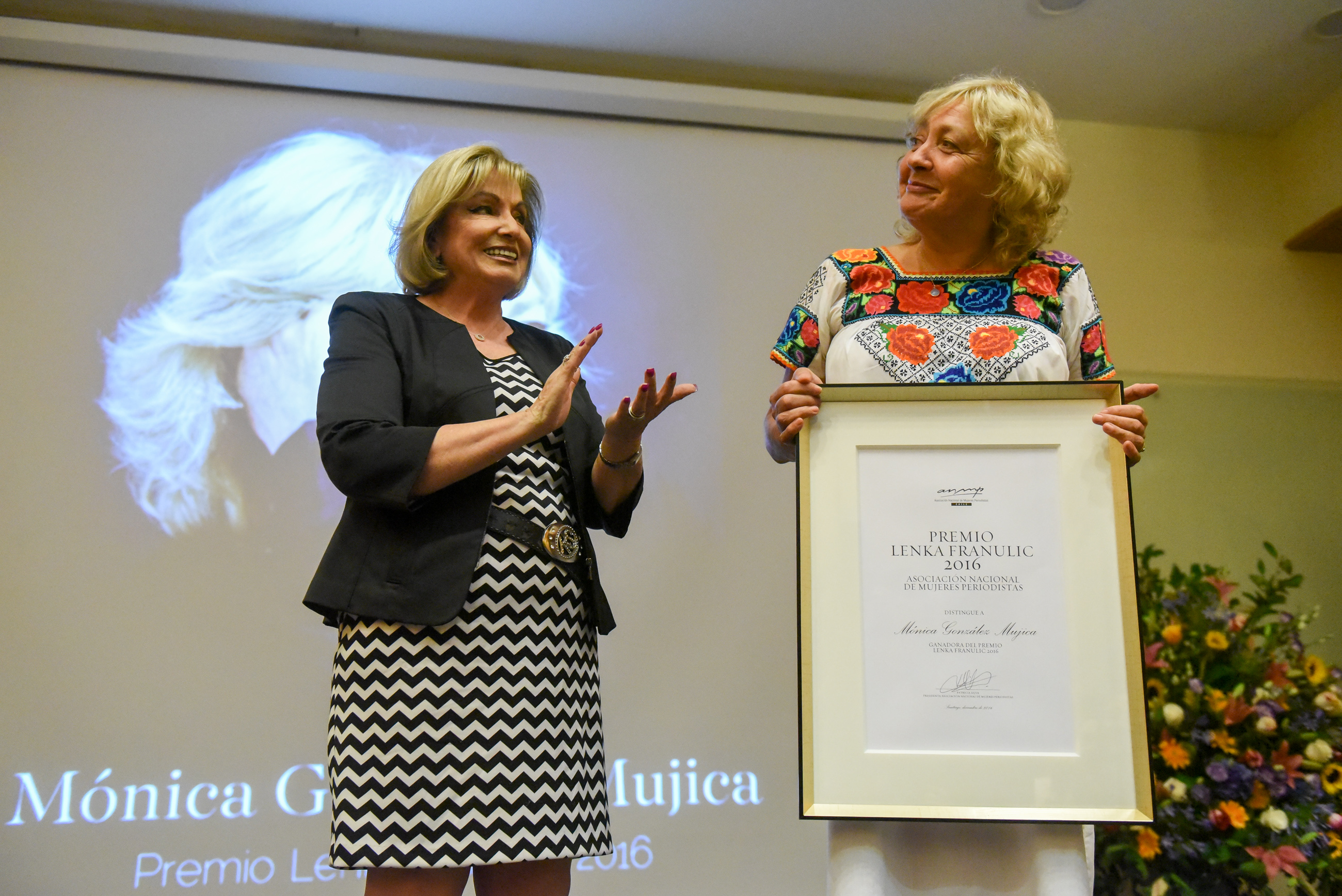
- Presentation of the 2016 Award to Mónica González Mujica
- Awarded for: Women's journalism
- Sponsored by: National Association of Women Journalists of Chile
- Country: Chile
- First award: 1963
- Currently held by: Marcia Scantlebury

The Lenka Franulic Award (Spanish: Premio Lenka Franulic) is a Chilean prize, whose purpose is to recognize career achievement in women's journalism. It has been given annually since 1963 by the National Association of Women Journalists of Chile. It is named for Lenka Franulic, the first Chilean woman journalist.

The winner is determined by a jury composed of the president of the Association of Journalists, the current holder of the National Prize for Journalism, the president of the Association of Women Journalists, the last Lenka Franulic Award winner, and the directors of the journalism schools of the University of Chile, the Catholic University of Chile, and one private university.

== Winners ==
Year	Name
1963	Raquel Correa Prats
1964	Blanca Tejos Muñoz
1965	María Eugenia Oyarzún
1966	Yolanda Ross
1967	Irene Blumenthal Geis
1968	Erica Vexler and C. Machado
1969	Silvia Pinto Torres
1970	Lucía Gevert Parada
1971	Patricia Guzmán Jofré
1972	María Romero Cordero
1973	Gilda González Valenzuela
1974	Luisa Lara Armijo
1975	Olga Balmaceda Valdés
1976	Carmen Merino Wilson
1977	Rosa Robinovitch Castro
1978	Teresa Donoso Loero
1979	Gloria Urgelles Villar
1980	Yolanda Montecinos Pineda
1981	Marta Olivos Marchant
1982	Inés María Cardone
1983	Carmen Puelma
1984	Gloria Stanley Carbone
1985	Marina de Navasal
1986	Graciela Romero
1987	Ada Mongillo Pescetto
1988	Pilar Vergara
1990	Marta Sánchez
1992	Mercedes Ducci
1994	Verónica López Helfmann
1995	Mónica Cerda
1996	María Eugenia de la Jara de Goyeneche
1997	Gemma Contreras
1998	Cecilia Serrano Gildemeister
2001	Pilar Bernstein
2010	María Olga Delpiano
2014	Paula Escobar
2015	Andrea Vial
2016	Mónica González Mujica
2017	Patricia Politzer
2018	Marcia Scantlebury
2021	Francisca Skoknic

== See also ==
- List of media awards honoring women
