= Isabel Farías Meyer =

Chilean journalist and advocate for people with primary ovarian insufficiency (born 1992)

- Born: 1992 (age 33–34); Chile
- Education: Gabriela Mistral University Adolfo Ibáñez University
- Occupation: journalist www.fundacionrespuestas.com
- Known for: Primary Ovarian Insufficiency (POI) Advocate

Isabel Farías Meyer (born c. 1992) is a Chileand journalist and strategic communications specialist, and founder concerning Primary Ovarian Insufficiency and is the executive director of Fundación Respuestas. Her impact and influence has been recognised by the BBC and the Chilean government.

== Life ==
Farías was born in Chile in 1992. She was diagnosed with Primary ovarian insufficiency at the age of seventeen, after experiencing symptoms of the condition. She had irregular periods and difficulties with her emotions and her weight. The cause of this ovarian condition effecting women under the age of 40. The cause of this ovarian condition affecting women under the age of 40, including adolescents, is normally unknown, although it can sometimes have an external cause.

Her work has focused on raising awareness of Primary ovarian insufficiency and promoting public policies related to the condition. Among her goals are the establishment of a National Day for Primary Ovarian Insufficiency and its inclusion in Chile's GES health coverage system. She has also sought to position Chile as a regional reference in the recognition, diagnosis and treatment of primary ovarian insufficiency.

In 2024, Farías created the first Latin American regional network exchanging information about Primary ovarian insufficiency, the "Fundación Respuestas". This organisation works to disseminate information, combat myths and create safe spaces. It has been reported that 1 in 100 and maybe 1 in 25 women suffer from Primary ovarian insufficiency. Premature ovarian failure is not a premature menopause. In that year, Farias was recognized by the BBC in its annual list of 100 inspiring and influential women from around the world.

On July 11, 2025, she was one of five women journalists who were named by Nicola Cardoch, who is a government Undersecretary General, for their impact and Resilience. The ceremony took place at the National Library in Santiago on Journalists Day. The other four were María Olivia Monckeberg, Paula Escobar, Mónica González and Érika Montecinos.

Her work has been also recognised by Spanish Association for the Study of Menopause and the Latin American Federation of Climacteric and Menopause Societies and they intend to publish a free booklet in Chile about her condition. The project will be supported by Gabriela Mistral University and will be titled "Los Ovarios de Catalina" (Catalina's Ovaries).
