= Juan Marín =

Juan Marín may refer to:

- Juan Marin (judoka) (born 1952), Puerto Rican judoka
- Juan Marín (Spanish politician) (born 1962)
- Juan Alvarado Marín (born 1948), Mexican footballer
- Juan Antonio Marín (born 1975), Costa Rican tennis player
- Juan David Marín (born 1998), Colombian footballer
- Juan Rodolfo Marín (1909–1967), Chilean journalist and politician

== See also ==
- Juan Marén (born 1971), Cuban wrestler
