= María Romero =

María Romero may refer to:

- María Elena Romero, Mexican diver
- María Romero Cordero, Chilean journalist and film critic
- María Romero Meneses, Nicaraguan Catholic religious sister
- Maria Pilar Romero, Argentine handball player
