= Mónica González (journalist) =

Chilean writer and journalist

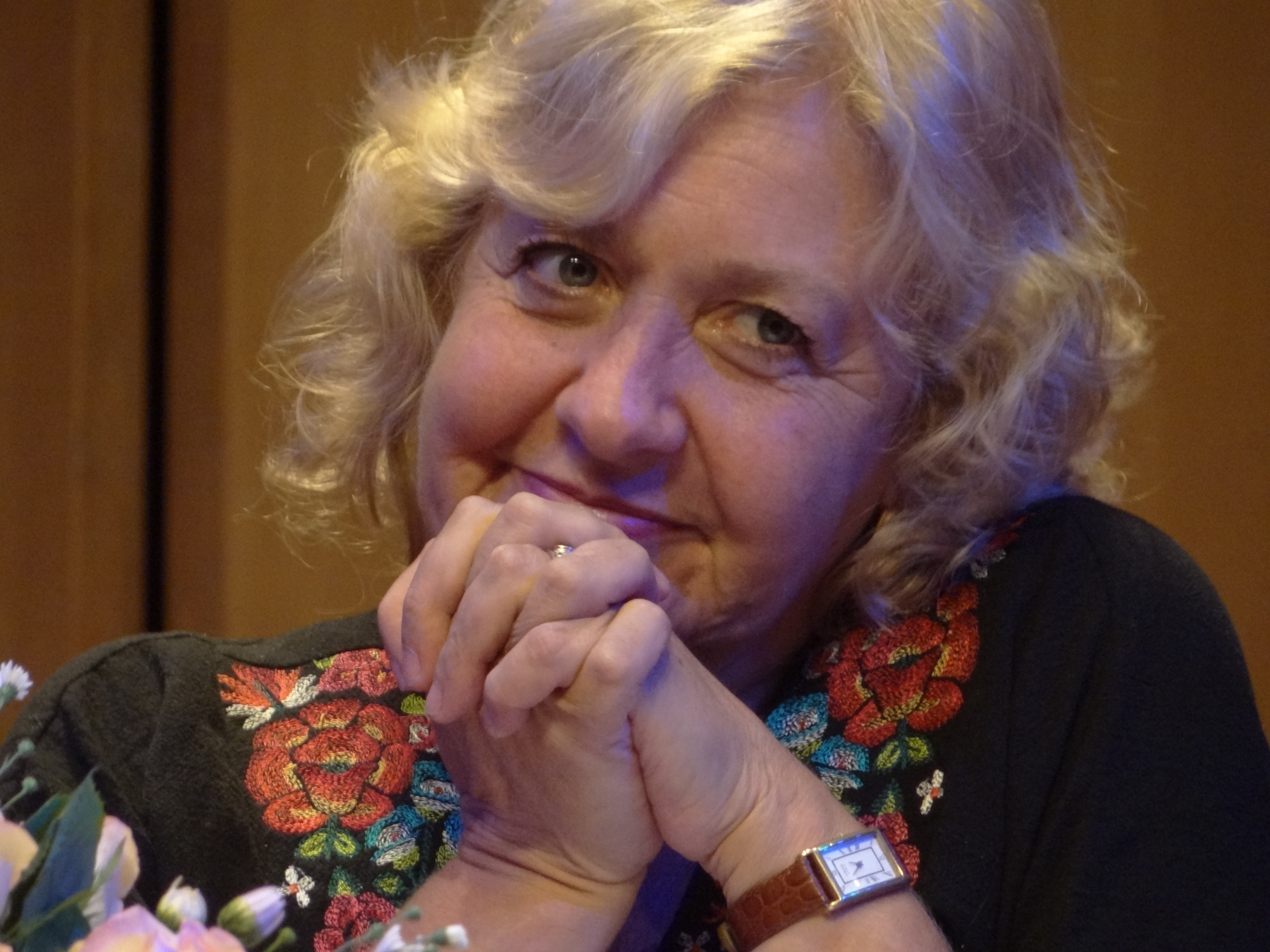
Mónica González in 2013

Mónica González Mujica (born 24 October 1949) is a Chilean writer and journalist. She won the Maria Moors Cabot Prize in 2002, the Dan David Prize in 2006 and UNESCO/Guillermo Cano World Press Freedom Prize 2010. From 2005-2006 she was editor of Diario Siete, a daily paper in Santiago de Chile which ran for a year.

It is from Mónica Gonzales writing in her book on the military coup La Conjura. Los mil y un días del golpe that we have the account of the 1973 putchist General Arellano claiming that he confronted Pinochet with the stark choice of supporting the coup or assuming the risk of civil war. In the 2013 film Viva Chile Mierda, González was interviewed by film-maker Adrian Goycoolea about her experience during the Chilean coup and her interviews with Andres Valenzuela, a guard who revealed the use of torture by the regime.

On July 11 2025 she was one of five women journalists who were named by Nicola Cardoch, who is a government Undersecretary General, for their impact and Resilience. The ceremony took place at the National Library in Santiago on Journalists Day. The other four were María Olivia Monckeberg, Paula Escobar, Isabel Farías Meyer and Érika Montecinos.

== Works ==
- Bomba en una calle de Palermo (1986), with Edwin Harrington.
- Los secretos del Comando Conjunto (1989), with Héctor Contreras.
- Chile entre el Sí y el No (1988), with Florencia Varas.
- La Conjura. Los mil y un días del golpe (2000).
- Apuntes de una época feroz. Reportajes y entrevistas en dictadura (2015).
