= Pedro Rodríguez =

Pedro Rodriguez may refer to:

== Sports ==
- Pedro Rodríguez (athlete), Cuban shot putter who won in the Athletics at the 1926 Central American and Caribbean Games
- Pedro Rodríguez (racing driver) (1940–1971), Mexican racing driver
- Pedro Rodríguez (cyclist, born 1950), Cuban cyclist
- Pedro Rodríguez (water polo) (born 1955), Cuban water polo player
- Pedro Rodríguez (cyclist, born 1966), Ecuadorian cyclist
- Pedro Rodríguez (weightlifter), Cuban weightlifter who won in the Weightlifting at the 1991 Pan American Games
- Pedro (footballer, born 1987) (Pedro Eliezer Rodríguez Ledesma), Spanish footballer, played for Barcelona and Chelsea
- Pedro Rodríguez (footballer, born 2008) (Pedro Rodríguez Iglesias), Spanish footballer for Barcelona
- Pedro Rodríguez (motorcyclist) (born 1994), Spanish Grand Prix motorcycle racer
- Pedro Rodríguez (cyclist, born 1994), Ecuadorian cyclist at the 2013 UCI Road World Championship
- Pedro Rodríguez Álvarez (born 1990), Spanish-Hungarian handball player

== Other people ==
- Pedro Rodríguez (cardinal) (died 1310), bishop of Burgos
- Pedro Rodriguez de Miranda (1696–1766), Spanish painter of the late-Baroque period
- Pedro Rodríguez, Count of Campomanes (1723–1802), Spanish statesman and writer
- Pedro Rodríguez (politician) (1869–1932), Philippine politician
- Pedro Jesús Rodríguez (1907–1982), Chilean lawyer, academic and politician
- Pedro Rodríguez (soldier) (1912–1999), Puerto Rican Korean War hero who won two Silver Star Medals
- Pedro Rodriguez (scientist) (born 1953), Puerto Rican scientist and inventor in NASA
- Pedro A. Rodríguez (born 1968), PPD member of the 15th Legislative Assembly of Puerto Rico
- Pedro Rodríguez (theologian) (1933–2026), Spanish theologian
- Pedro Rodríguez (Paraguayan politician), president of the Chamber of Deputies of Paraguay 2017–2018

== Other uses ==
- Pedro-Rodríguez, a municipality in the province of Ávila, Castile and León, Spain
- Pedro Rodrigues Filho (1954–2023), a prolific serial killer
