= William Thayer Arteaga =

Chilean politician (1918–2018)

William Thayer
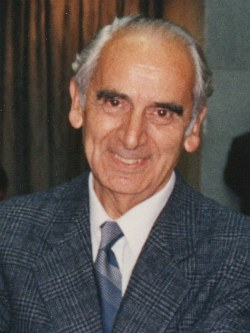

Member of the Senate of Chile
- In office 11 March 1990 – 11 March 1998
- Preceded by: Appointed Senator
- Succeeded by: Augusto Parra Muñoz

Minister of Justice of Chile
- In office 15 February 1968 – 14 August 1968
- President: Eduardo Frei Montalva
- Preceded by: Pedro Jesús Rodríguez
- Succeeded by: Jaime Castillo Velasco

Minister of Labor and Social Provision
- In office 3 November 1964 – 15 February 1968
- President: Eduardo Frei Montalva
- Preceded by: Miguel Schweitzer Speisky
- Succeeded by: Eduardo León Villarreal

Head of the Austral University of Chile
- In office 1968–1973
- Preceded by: Félix Martínez Bonati
- Succeeded by: Gustavo Dupuis Pinillos

Personal details
- Born: 12 October 1918 Santiago, Chile
- Died: 28 May 2018 (aged 99)
- Party: National Falange (1942−1957); Christian Democratic Party (1957−1975); Social Christian Movement (1983−1987); National Labour Front (1985−1987); National Renewal (1987−1989)
- Spouse: Alicia Morel
- Children: Seven
- Education: Sagrados Corazones School
- Alma mater: Pontifical Catholic University of Chile
- Occupation: Politician
- Profession: Lawyer

William Turpin Thayer Arteaga (born 12 October 1918−28 May 2018) was a Chilean politician who served as ministry of State during the period of Eduardo Frei Montalva to later be a collaborator of Augusto Pinochet's dictatorship.

He is emeritus professor of the Pontifical Catholic University of Chile.

== Biography ==
=== Family and youth ===
He was born in Santiago on 12 October 1918. He was the son of Laura Arteaga Ureta and Luis Thayer Ojeda, a historian, genealogist, pen-and-ink illustrator, musical composer, and author of numerous books. On 30 November 1945, he married Alicia Morel Chaigneau, a writer. Together they had seven children. He died in Santiago on 28 May 2018.

=== Education and professional career ===
He completed his primary education at the Sagrados Corazones School (Padres Franceses) in Viña del Mar and his secondary education at the city’s Liceo. He later entered the Faculty of Law of the Pontifical Catholic University of Chile, earning his law degree with the thesis “Professional Orientation and Legal Vocation.” He qualified as a lawyer on 19 July 1945.

After graduating, he practiced law primarily in the field of labor law and also engaged in academic teaching at the Pontifical Catholic University of Chile and the University of Chile.

On 28 June 1968, during a plenary session of the university senate, he was elected Rector of the Austral University of Chile for a four-year term. He was re-elected with 68% of the vote for a second term, but served only a few months of that period, until December 1973, when he was removed from office by the Military Junta established after the military coup of 11 September 1973.

As rector, he promoted the university’s regional character by reactivating the Institute of Regional Studies, which had been inactive at the time of his election. In February 1971, he signed an agreement with the Inter-American Development Bank to implement the Institutional Development Plan, which enabled the construction of the Gabriela Mistral Building (A), now the Central Library; the Pugin Building (B); and the Federico Saelzer Building (C), all located on the Isla Teja campus.

Between 1981 and 1989, he served as general manager of the Legal Publishing House of Chile – Editorial Andrés Bello.

After completing his term as senator, he devoted himself primarily to teaching at the University for Development, where he also served as vice-rector.

== Political career ==
He began his political involvement while studying law, serving as treasurer of the student federation, secretary general and vice-president of the National Association of Catholic Students between 1940 and 1941, and president of the Law Students’ Center in 1941.

In 1942, he joined the Falange Nacional after having Eduardo Frei Montalva as his professor of labor law, and later became a member of the Christian Democratic Party of Chile.

On 3 November 1964, President Eduardo Frei Montalva appointed him Minister of Labor and Social Security, a position he held until 15 February 1968. He subsequently served as Minister of Justice until 14 August of the same year, and simultaneously acted as interim Minister of Public Education between 17 February and 4 March 1968.

In 1975, he was expelled from the Christian Democratic Party due to his support for the military regime of Augusto Pinochet. From the previous year, he had been a member of the Second Legislative Commission of the Military Junta.

Between 1974 and 1976, he served on the Executive Council of UNESCO, and in 1978 he acted as an advisor to the Minister of Foreign Affairs. During this same period, he was Executive Director of Televisión Nacional de Chile.

On 20 March 1981, he was appointed a member of the Council of State in his capacity as former rector of the Austral University of Chile, remaining in that role until 1990.

Between 1983 and 1987, he was part of the Christian Social Movement, which brought together sectors of the Christian Democratic Party that supported the Pinochet regime. In 1987, he joined National Renewal.

=== Other activities ===
In May 1948, together with other business leaders and at the invitation of Jesuit priest Alberto Hurtado, he helped found the Christian Union of Business Leaders (USEC). On 20 July 1984, he was admitted as a full member of the Chilean Academy of Social, Political and Moral Sciences, delivering the lecture “Notes for an Understanding of Chilean Pluralism.”

=== Honours ===
He received several distinctions, including an honorary doctorate from the Austral University of Chile, the National Security Council Award, and the rank of Officer of the Order of Merit of the French Republic.
