= Carmen Puelma =

Chilean journalist

- Born: Carmen Puelma Accorsi; 8 September 1933; Santiago, Chile
- Died: 27 December 2009 (aged 76); Santiago, Chile
- Education: Pontifical Catholic University of Chile
- Occupation: Journalist
- Years active: 1969–1986
- Spouses: Gustavo Krefft; Pablo Grand
- Children: 2
- Awards: Lenka Franulic Award (1983)

Carmen Puelma Accorsi (8 September 1933 – 27 December 2009) was an award-winning Chilean journalist.

== Biography ==
After some decoration and nursing studies, in 1964 Puelma entered the journalism field at the Pontifical Catholic University of Chile, from which she graduated in 1969. That year she joined Radio Cooperativa, where she was head of news and press director until 1973. She was also an announcer, notably for the political program Las mujeres también improvisan – a reference to Canal 13's A esta hora se improvisa, whose panel was composed only of men – which featured Patricia Guzmán, Silvia Pinto, and Raquel Correa, among others. It was known for its rigid opposition to the government of Salvador Allende. During the same period she was director of the magazines Eva from 1971 to 1973 and Ideas para su hogar from 1976 to 1978.

After the 11 September 1973 coup d'état, Puelma was appointed cultural and press attaché in Washington D. C. (1973–1974) and Paris (1974–1976). Upon returning to Chile, she joined Televisión Nacional de Chile (TVN), a channel at which she was a commentator and, beginning in 1982, a morning news host. She later worked at University of Chile Television. In the written press she worked for the newspapers La Tercera – where she was a columnist and economic reporter – and El Cronista. She also worked for Radio Agricultura, where she was part of the press committee, and for the Chilean Safety Association (Asociación Chilena de Seguridad; ACHS) as a communications consultant.

== Personal life ==
Carmen Puelma was the sister of lawyer and academic Álvaro Puelma Accorsi. She had two marriages: the first to architect Gustavo Krefft, which lasted 14 years and produced two children, Gustavo and Gonzalo, and the second to industrialist Pablo Grand, which lasted four years.

On 14 July 1986 she suffered a stroke that left her in a wheelchair and forced her to abandon all professional activities. She died in 2009, from lung cancer.

== Awards and honours ==
- In 1994, the AHCS established the Carmen Puelma Accorsi Award in her honor.
- Puelma received the Lenka Franulic Award in 1983.
