= Augusto Parra Muñoz =

Chilean diplomat

Augusto Parra
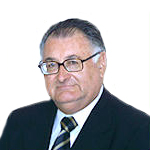

Ambassador of Chile to Russia
- In office 11 March 2006 – 11 March 2010
- President: Michelle Bachelet
- Preceded by: Mario Silberman
- Succeeded by: Juan Egiguren Guzmán

Appointed Senator of Chile
- In office 11 March 1998 – 11 March 2006
- President: Eduardo Frei Ruiz-Tagle; Ricardo Lagos
- Preceded by: William Thayer Arteaga
- Succeeded by: Office abolished

Head of the University of Concepción
- In office 11 June 1990 – 1997
- Preceded by: Carlos Von Plessing
- Succeeded by: Sergio Lavanchy

Personal details
- Born: 10 August 1942 (age 84) Yumbel, Chile
- Party: Radical Party of Chile; Radical Social Democratic Party (1994−2018)
- Spouse: Patricia Ahumada Morales
- Children: Three
- Education: University of Concepción (BA); University of Antwerp (MA)
- Occupation: Politician
- Profession: Lawyer; Economist

César Augusto Parra Muñoz (born 10 August 1942) is a Chilean diplomat who has served as a diplomat and parliamentary.

Parra served as Institutional Senator for the 1998–2006 term, by virtue of his position as former university rector. He also served as councilor of the Concepción Bar Association for two terms and as its president from 1985 to 1986. In October 2019, in the context of the 469th anniversary of Concepción, he was distinguished as «Distinguished Neighbor of the year».

He also served as Mayor of Concepción in 1990, Rector of the University of Concepción between 1990 and 1997, and Ambassador Extraordinary and Plenipotentiary of his country to the Russian Federation, presenting his Letter of Credence to then-President of Russia Vladimir Putin on 25 July 2006.

== Biography ==
=== Family and youth ===
He was born in Yumbel, Chile, on 10 August 1942. He was the son of Pedro Parra Nova and María Elena Muñoz González.

He married Patricia Ahumada Morales, with whom he had three children.

=== Professional career ===
He completed his primary education at the Public School of Bulnes and finished it at the República de Brasil School in Concepción. His secondary education was completed at the Enrique Molina Garmendia Boys’ High School in Concepción. After completing his schooling, he entered the Law School of the University of Concepción, qualifying as a lawyer in 1967. In April of the same year, he began his academic career in the Department of Economic Law of the Faculty of Legal and Social Sciences at the University of Concepción.

In 1972, he received a scholarship to pursue postgraduate studies in Belgium. The following year, in 1973, the University of Antwerp awarded him a Master’s degree in the Promotion of Law, with a specialization in Finance and Economic Planning.

In 1974, he returned to Chile and assumed the directorship of the Department of Economic Law at the University of Concepción, a position he held until 1976. That same year, he became a member of both the Chilean Institute of Tax Law and the Latin American Institute of Tax Law, where he served as alternate director representing Chile.

In 1979, he was invited by the University of Leuven to participate in an International Forum on Economic Integration between Europe and Latin America.

In 1983, he received an invitation from the Inter-American Development Bank (IDB) to participate as a lecturer in a course on Latin American Integration organized by the Institute for the Integration of Latin America and the Caribbean (INTAL) in Buenos Aires.

He is the author of various academic works on university affairs and higher education, as well as author and co-author of numerous studies and publications related to tax law. He has participated as a speaker and organizer of national and international seminars in his field of specialization.

== Political career ==
On 11 March 1990, at the request of the President of the Republic, Patricio Aylwin, and in accordance with the legislation in force at the time, he assumed office as Mayor of Concepción. He resigned from this position in order to run for the rectorship of the University of Concepción. He was elected rector in accordance with university statutes on 11 May 1990 and assumed office on 11 June of that year. He was re-elected rector for a second four-year term in 1994, by University Decree No. 94-104 dated 10 June 1994. He resigned from the rectorship in April 1997.

That same year, he joined the commission responsible for selecting projects to be financed by the Montegrande Program on educational reform and was elected a full member of the Academy of Social, Political and Moral Sciences of the Institute of Chile.

On 8 July 1994, President Eduardo Frei Ruiz-Tagle appointed him as a member of the National Commission for the Modernization of Education.

In December 1997, in his capacity as former university rector, he was appointed Institutional Senator for the 1998–2006 term.

As a member of the Radical Social Democratic Party (PRSD), he served as Third Vice President of the National Executive Committee, chaired by Anselmo Sule.

In June 2006, President Michelle Bachelet appointed him Ambassador of Chile to Russia, a position he held until March 2010.
