= Minesapride =

Clinical data
- Other names: DSP-6952; DSP6952
- Routes of administration: Oral
- Drug class: Serotonin 5-HT_{4} receptor agonist
- ATC code: None

Identifiers
- IUPAC name: 4-amino-5-chloro-N-[[(2S)-4-[[1-(2-hydroxyacetyl)piperidin-4-yl]methyl]morpholin-2-yl]methyl]-2-methoxybenzamide
- CAS Number: 1184662-54-1
- PubChem CID: 67055669
- DrugBank: DB20801
- ChemSpider: 64835233
- UNII: I7V9UD0ND0

Chemical and physical data
- Formula: C_{21}H_{31}ClN_{4}O_{5}
- Molar mass: 454.95 g·mol^{−1}
- 3D model (JSmol): Interactive image
- SMILES: COC1=CC(=C(C=C1C(=O)NC[C@H]2CN(CCO2)CC3CCN(CC3)C(=O)CO)Cl)N
- InChI: InChI=1S/C21H31ClN4O5/c1-30-19-9-18(23)17(22)8-16(19)21(29)24-10-15-12-25(6-7-31-15)11-14-2-4-26(5-3-14)20(28)13-27/h8-9,14-15,27H,2-7,10-13,23H2,1H3,(H,24,29)/t15-/m0/s1; Key:YNGWOFISMAAXPB-HNNXBMFYSA-N

Minesapride (INN; developmental code name DSP-6952) is a serotonin 5-HT_{4} receptor agonist which was under development for the treatment of constipation and irritable bowel syndrome (IBS) but was never marketed. It is taken orally. The drug was under development by Dainippon Sumitomo Pharma. It reached phase 2 clinical trials prior to the discontinuation of its development. The drug showed inadequate effectiveness in phase 2 trials.

== Pharmacology ==
=== Pharmacokinetics ===
A phase 1 study showed that minesapride plasma exposure increased in a dose-proportional manner with an acceptable safety profile at doses up to 120 mg per day. A dedicated open-label pharmacokinetic study was subsequently conducted in 12 elderly and 12 young Japanese subjects, each receiving a single oral dose of 40 mg in the fasted state. Minesapride was rapidly absorbed, with a peak plasma concentration Cmax of 2,302.1 ng/mL in the elderly group and 2,117.5 ng/mL in the younger group. Plasma concentrations subsequently declined with a half-life of approximately 7 hours.

No notable pharmacokinetic differences were observed between the elderly and younger groups. Metabolite profiles in plasma and urine were similar between groups, and no major metabolites exceeded 10% of unchanged minesapride; an in vitro study using cryopreserved hepatocytes suggested that there were no human-specific metabolites. The authors concluded that no dose adjustment is warranted in elderly patients without renal or hepatic impairment.

=== Mechanism of action ===
Skeletal formula of serotonin (5-hydroxytryptamine, 5-HT), the endogenous neurotransmitter whose 5-HT4 receptor subtype is the molecular target of minesapride.

Skeletal formula of prucalopride, an approved 5-HT4 receptor agonist whose binding affinity at 5-HT4 receptors is comparable to that of minesapride.

Minesapride is a selective partial agonist at the 5-HT4(b) receptor subtype with a binding affinity (Ki) of 51.9 nM. In isolated guinea pig colon preparations, the compound produced contraction with an EC_{50} of 271.6 nM and a low intrinsic activity of 57%, a profile similar to that of tegaserod and mosapride. Its affinity for 5-HT4 receptors has been described as comparable to that of prucalopride.

=== Cardiovascular safety ===
A key concern in the development of 5-HT4 receptor agonists has been cardiovascular safety, as earlier agents in this class were associated with arrhythmia risk. A 2012 systematic review by Tack and colleagues encompassing researchers from the University of Leuven, Mayo Clinic, UCLA, and other institutions documented that the nonselective 5-HT_{4} receptor agonists cisapride and tegaserod had been associated with cardiovascular adverse events, and concluded that greater selectivity for the 5-HT_{4} receptor over non-5-HT_{4} receptors may be associated with a more favorable cardiovascular safety profile. In preclinical testing, minesapride demonstrated minimal inhibitory effects on human ether-a-go-go-related gene (hERG) potassium channels up to 100 μM in both hERG channel assays and guinea pig cardiomyocytes. In telemetered conscious monkeys, the compound did not affect blood pressure or any electrocardiogram (ECG) parameter at oral doses up to 180 mg/kg; however, a transient increase in heart rate was observed, also seen in anaesthetised dogs, and was completely antagonised by a selective 5-HT4 receptor antagonist, confirming its pharmacological origin. Minesapride also did not induce contraction in the rabbit coronary artery up to 100 μM, distinguishing it from tegaserod and sumatriptan and suggesting an absence of cardiac ischaemic risk via coronary vasoconstriction.

=== Gastrointestinal effects ===
In non-clinical studies, minesapride enhanced gastric motility and caused colonic giant migrating contractions (GMCs) associated with defecation in conscious dogs, with an ED_{50} for inducing colonic GMCs of 1.56 mg/kg. The compound significantly enhanced colonic transit rate in guinea pigs at doses of 3–10 mg/kg, an effect blocked by SB-207266, a selective 5-HT4 receptor antagonist, confirming that the prokinetic activity is mediated through 5-HT4 receptors. In mice, minesapride at 1–10 mg/kg rapidly increased faecal wet weight without increasing fluid content, unlike sennoside, which increased fluid content and produced diarrhoea. The compound also improved clonidine- and morphine-induced delays in whole-gut transit in mice, with ED_{50} values of 0.429 mg/kg and 0.310 mg/kg respectively, representing atonic and spastic constipation models. In viscerally hypersensitive rats, minesapride significantly inhibited the colorectal distension-induced visceromotor response, an effect shared with tegaserod but not with prucalopride, suggesting an additional visceral analgesic mechanism beyond prokinetic activity.

== Clinical trials ==
=== Phase 2a study (2012–2013) ===
An early phase 2 double-blind trial enrolled 171 patients with Rome III-defined IBS-C at 33 centres in Japan between December 2012 and August 2013. Patients were randomly assigned to receive minesapride at doses of 1, 4, 12, or 40 mg, or placebo, once daily for four weeks. The primary outcome measured improvement in the weekly frequency of complete spontaneous bowel movements (CSBMs), abdominal symptoms, and overall IBS-C symptom severity.

The change from baseline in weekly CSBM frequency was greater in all minesapride groups than in the placebo group at week 4, with the greatest improvement in the 40 mg group. The abdominal symptoms score improved in the 40 mg group, and the overall IBS severity index score decreased from baseline to week 4 in the 12 mg and 40 mg groups compared with placebo (P = .048 and P < .001 respectively). The proportions of patients with treatment-emergent adverse events were 55.0% in the pooled minesapride groups and 60.0% in the placebo group; the most common adverse event was diarrhoea, occurring in 42.9% of minesapride-treated patients and 37.1% of placebo-treated patients.

=== Phase 2b study (2017) ===
A subsequent late-phase 2 multicentre, double-blind, placebo-controlled, dose-finding trial enrolled 411 patients with Rome IV-defined IBS-C at 43 medical institutions in Japan between January and October 2017. Patients were randomised in a 1:1:1:1 ratio to receive minesapride at 10, 20, or 40 mg per day, or placebo, once daily after breakfast for 12 weeks, preceded by a two-week placebo run-in period. The primary endpoint was the FDA composite responder rate, defined as patients reporting both an increase of at least one CSBM per week from baseline and a reduction of at least 30% in the weekly average worst abdominal pain score, in the same week for at least 6 of 12 treatment weeks.

The FDA composite responder rate was 13.6% in the placebo group, 13.6% in the 10 mg group, 19.2% in the 20 mg group, and 14.9% in the 40 mg group; no dose-response relationship was found, and the primary endpoint was not met. However, the percentage of patients meeting the stricter composite endpoint (both criteria met in the same week for at least 9 of 12 weeks) was 3.9% in the placebo group compared with 12.9% in the 40 mg group (P < 0.05). Minesapride 40 mg also significantly increased the frequency of spontaneous bowel movements (SBMs) compared with placebo throughout the treatment period, with an adjusted P < 0.001 at week 12.

The most common treatment-emergent adverse event was diarrhoea, reported as mild in all cases. No deaths occurred in any treatment group. In all minesapride groups, heart rate was slightly increased by approximately 3 beats per minute from baseline; one patient in the 40 mg group experienced moderate tachycardia and discontinued the study drug. No clinically significant QT prolongation was observed. The authors concluded that minesapride was safe and well-tolerated at doses up to 40 mg for 12 weeks. The study was described as the first randomised controlled trial to evaluate minesapride in patients with IBS-C diagnosed according to Rome IV criteria.

=== Qt/qtc study ===
A dedicated thorough QT/QTc study, conducted according to the International Council for Harmonisation (ICH) guideline, demonstrated that minesapride has no effect on QT prolongation. This finding was consistent with the preclinical data showing minimal hERG channel inhibition, and was cited in the phase 2b clinical trial report as supporting the cardiovascular safety of the compound.

== See also ==
- 5-HT_{4} receptor
- Functional constipation
- Prucalopride
- Tegaserod
- Mosapride
- Serotonin
- Sumitomo Pharma
