= Puelma =

Puelma is a surname. Notable people with the surname include:

- Alfredo Valenzuela Puelma (1856–1909), Chilean painter
- Carmen Puelma (1933–2009), Chilean journalist
- Dora Puelma (1898–1972), Chilean artist
