= Erica Vexler =

- Died: 30 April 2011; Tel Aviv, Israel
- Education: University of Chile
- Occupations: Journalist, editor, television presenter
- Children: Mariana
- Awards: Lenka Franulic Award

Erica Vexler Poreiki (died 30 April 2011) was a Chilean journalist, editor, and television presenter best known for her reporting for the magazine Ercilla – of which she was editor in 1966 and subsequently subeditor until 1970 – and for presenting the program Erika Vexler 600 on Canal 13. In 1968, the National Association of Women Journalists of Chile presented her with the Lenka Franulic Award, which she shared with Carmen Machado.

In 1970, after the victory of Salvador Allende in the presidential election, she moved to Israel, where she served as a correspondent for Televisa.

== Colonia Dignidad case ==
Vexler was one of the first journalists to investigate and publish a series of denunciations about the conditions that existed in the former Colonia Dignidad, in co-authorship with Osvaldo Murray and Juan Ehrmann. These incited the first judicial inquiry into the colony between 1966 and 1968, without conclusive results. Such reports appeared in Ercilla during the 1960s:

- Vexler, Erica; Muray, Osvaldo; Ehrmann, Juan (30 March 1966). "Tras los Muros de la 'Dignidad'" [Behind the Walls of the 'Dignidad']. Ercilla. Torrente, Heliodor.
- Vexler, Erica; Ehrmann, Juan; Muray Q., Osvaldo (6 April 1966). "La Colonia del Terror". Ercilla.
