= Rafael Maluenda =

Chilean journalist and writer

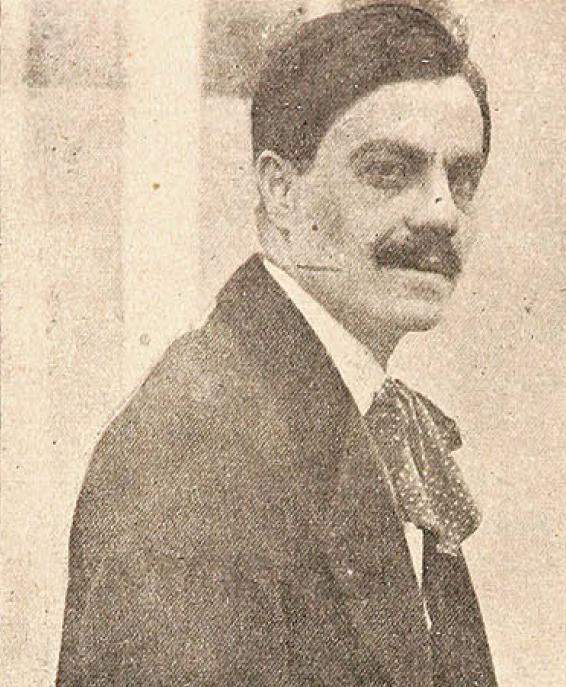
Maluenda in 1911

Rafael Maluenda Labarca (18 March 1885 – 4 September 1963) was a Chilean journalist and writer.

== Early life and education ==
Maluenda was born on 18 March 1885 in the Posada del Corregidor in Santiago, where his parents were attending a party. He was the eldest of three children born to Colonel Aarón Maluenda Araos, a veteran of the War of the Pacific, and Mariana Labarca Toro, sister of Guillermo Labarca Hubertson. He attended primary school at a public school and the Patronato de San Rafael, a school of the Seminario de Santo Domingo. In 1903, he enrolled at the Instituto Nacional, where he completed his humanities in 1904. While there, he founded, edited, and illustrated the school magazine El Deber. He received a scholarship.

In 1904, when he was nineteen years old, he began working for five years as a reporter for the newspaper La Ley, where he published his first critical article. That September, he also published his first short story, "Rebelión", in the magazine Chile Ilustrado. In 1905, he enrolled at the University of Chile's Faculty of Architecture, where he was classmates with Pedro Prado. After his mother's death the following year, he abandoned these studies to focus on journalism and writing.

== Early career ==
From 1906 until 1909, Maluenda was Secretary of Commissions for the Faculty of Humanities at the University of Chile, working under José Toribio Medina. Also in 1906, he began writing short stories and plays for the magazine Zig-Zag. In 1909, Maluenda published his first book, Escenas de la vida campesina, a collection of short stories. These included "No Pancho", a revised version of "Rebelión"; "En el rodeo," which he had previously read aloud in sessions at the Ateneo de Santiago; and "El gañan", which won first place in a literary competition organized by the journal Letras y Ciencias Sociales (from Tucumán, Argentina) and directed by Ricardo Jaimes Freyre. In 1911, he became editor for Zig-Zag and El Diario Ilustrado; he gained the latter job after examining the University of Chile's budget and discovering that the rector and subsecretary of instruction were embezzling. Also in 1911, one of his short stories won a national short story contest organized to celebrate the republic's centenary. In 1912, he translated Karin Michaelis's novel The Dangerous Age and Henri Bernstein's play The Claw from French into Spanish, and in 1913, wrote the plays La suerte, La esfinge, and Ibrahim Bey.

In 1914, Maluenda married Teresa Merino Feliú, with whom he would bear three children, and moved to Chillán, where he founded the newspaper El Día and took charge of the local theater, organizing the seasons of touring theater companies. In 1915, he wrote La Pachacha, and in 1916, published Venidos a menos. On 25 December 1916, he became director of La Discusión. In 1918, he left this job and returned to Santiago. There he collaborated with the magazine Sucesos, publishing a series of short stories that would later become the 1937 collection Colmena urbana. In 1919, he was asked by Arturo Alessandri to lead the journalism campaign for his 1920 presidential candidacy, for which he wrote a page in El Mercurio. Its founder, Agustín Edwards Mac-Clure, was so impressed with Maluenda that he hired him permanently. Maluenda wrote the newspaper's "Day to Day" section, which included political commentaries, essays, short stories, and literary criticism.

== Later career ==
Maluenda shared his time between El Mercurio and his own writing, which became increasingly focused on theatre. In 1920, he published two more plays, Luz que no muere and La madeja del pecado. Between 1922 and 1923, he oversaw the creation of two films, La copa del olvido and La víbora de azabache, making him a pioneer in Chilean cinema. Nevertheless, he would continue writing articles for the capital's newspapers and short stories, and in 1942, he published a novel, Armiño negro. In 1946, Maluenda became director of El Mercurio; he continued working for it until his death in 1963. His last major work published prior to his death was Historias de bandidos (1961); he died while preparing a collection of short stories about animals titled De pluma y pelo, which was published posthumously in 1989 by Editorial Andrés Bello.

During this time, he remained linked to Alessandri, promoting his ideas and developing his own. Of these, one of the most important was his proposal and orchestration of a campaign to organize the middle class. As part of this campaign, he edited a booklet titled: Manifiesto, Estatutos Generales y Documentos que sirven de base para la organización de la clase media en Chile and presented it to the Assembly of Santiago. However, despite receiving the support of important sectors of the country, this campaign failed to achieve the anticipated results.

Maluenda was also sent abroad on numerous occasions. In 1921, he travelled to Brazil on a journalistic mission. In 1922, he was sent to Asia as Consulate Inspector. In 1928, he became advisory secretary for the newly established Chilean embassy in Peru; while there, he wrote articles for El Mercurio about the customs of Limans that he would later use while writing Armiño negro. He travelled to Montevideo in 1933 and Buenos Aires in 1936 to cover the Seventh and Eighth Pan-American Conferences for El Mercurio, meeting Franklin Roosevelt at the latter. In 1942, he attended the Conference of Chancellors in Rio de Janeiro, where American republics severed ties with the Axis powers. He also covered the 1945 San Francisco Conference, which wrote the United Nations charter.

In 1954, Maluenda won the National Prize for Journalism. On 6 April 1955, he was appointed to the Chilean Academy of Language. On 23 April 1962, the Society of Chilean Playwrights gave him a medal to honor his forty years of playwriting.
