= Lenka Franulic =

Chilean journalist

- Born: 22 July 1908; Antofagasta, Chile
- Died: 25 May 1961 (aged 52); Santiago, Chile
- Occupation(s): writer, literary critic, journalist

Lenka Franulic (22 July 1908 – 25 May 1961) was a Chilean journalist and the first Chilean woman to be formally recognised as such. She was awarded the National Prize for Journalism, in the Feature category, in 1957.

== Biography ==
Descendant of Croatian immigrants both on the paternal and maternal sides, she was the daughter of Mateo Franulic Jerkovic and Zorka Zlatar Janovic. She was the eldest of two sisters, the youngest of whom, Dobrila, was an outstanding cellist. Her father died of kidney disease when she was 9 years old and her sister, 3.

She moved to Santiago to study English at the Pedagogical Institute of the University of Chile. Later, she obtained a job as a translator in Hoy Magazine, where she did her first articles, of a cultural nature. At Ercilla magazine, she became an interviewer, and later made radio appearances. In 1945 she was the director of Radio Nuevo Mundo and, later, a reporter for the "Nacional", "Cooperativa", "Agricultura" and "Minería" stations.

She interviewed various figures of her time, such as Jean Paul Sartre, Marshal Tito, Juan Domingo Perón, Eleanor Roosevelt, Nicolás Guillén, Fidel Castro, Anastasio Somoza, Gabriela Mistral, Emil Ludwig, André Malraux, and Simone de Beauvoir.

The most important characteristic of her work as a journalist was that her articles were aimed at capturing the opinions of these characters, raising the respective criticisms of those, in order to analyze the social and political course of the moment, beyond just highlighting the trajectory, contributions and merits of those he interviewed.

She created the Círculo de Periodistas de Santiago and, in 1953, participated in the founding of the School of Journalism of the University of Chile. She obtained the National Prize for Journalism (Feature category) in 1957. In turn, she was awarded Best Journalist of the Year by the Society of Women Professional Journalists of the United States, the only Chilean to have received this honor.

Suffering from lung cancer, she died at dawn on Thursday, 25 May 1961, at the age of 52.

Her funerals were attended by numerous personalities and their friends, such as the then president of Chile, Jorge Alessandri. Her burial place is in the Yugoslav mausoleum of the Santiago General Cemetery. Under an enormous stone head sculpted by the artist Lily Garafulic, there is a tombstone that contains a phrase from the speech that Pablo Neruda wrote for his great friend: "Eras presencia de mujeres y lección para un millón de hombres" (You were a presence for women and a lesson for a million men).

== Legacy ==
Since 1963, the National Association of Women Journalists of Chile has awarded the Lenka Franulic Award, in recognition of career achievement in women's journalism.

On 22 July 2023, Franulic's 115th birthday was celebrated through a Google Doodle.

== Works ==
=== Publications ===
- In 1939, Franulic published her first book, "One Hundred Contemporary Artists", with portraits of prominent writers of the time.
- In 1943, she published the "Anthology of the American Short Story."
- She wrote one short story, "Two Cents of Violets", the only one that has been found.

=== Translations ===
- "Kitty Foyle" by Christopher Morley
- "Boarding School" by Christa Winsloe
- "Harvey" by Mary Chase
- "The Waves" and "Intermission" by Virginia Woolf
- "Joseph Provider" by Thomas Mann
- "Has the Moon" by John Steinbeck
- "Charley's Aunt" by Brandon Thomas
- "The Lovers Terribles" and "Mischievous Spirit" by Noël Coward
