= Irene Geis =

Chilean journalist (born 1938)

- Born: Irene Bluthenthal Geis; 6 February 1938 (age 88); Germany
- Education: University of Chile
- Occupations: Journalist, writer, television presenter, editor
- Awards: Lenka Franulic Award; 1960s Workshop Award from Casa de las Américas

Irene Bluthenthal Geis (born 6 February 1938) is a Chilean journalist, writer, editor, and former television presenter, best known for hosting the program Emisión Cero on Canal 9 during the 1960s, and Contrapunto and Aire Libre in the early 1970s on the same channel.

== Biography ==
The daughter of German-Jewish parents, Geis was born in Germany and emigrated to Chile with her family in 1939. She returned to Chile to stay in 1977, after leaving for Argentina during the 1973 coup d'état.

She studied journalism at the University of Chile, and her career began at the newspaper La Tercera. While working as editor there, she contributed to the magazines 7 Días – between 26 March 1965 and 9 January 1967 – and Pluma y Pincel, in addition to being director of Fortín Mapocho. During her professional career she has received several honors for her journalistic work, among them the Lenka Franulic Award in 1967 and the 1960s Workshop Award from Casa de las Américas the same year.

In the literary field, Geis's first work was published in 1984 under the title Exiliario, a book compiling 11 of her short stories. In 1996 she published her first novel, Copa de vinagre, to mixed reviews.

In the area of teaching, Geis was a professor and director of the journalism school at the University of Concepción in the early 1970s. Beginning in the 1990s she occupied the same position at the Academy of Christian Humanism University. In addition, in 1998 she became a professor at the University of Chile's School of Journalism.

== Works ==
=== Fiction ===
- Exiliario (1984)
- Copa de vinagre (1996)
- Como un pájaro sin luz (2004)
- La pasión de Torquemada (2012)

=== Academic ===
- "Los hilos invisibles del deporte": uso ideológico del acontecimiento deportivo en dos diarios de circulación nacional, 1973–1988
