= Pedro Rodrigues =

Pedro Rodrigues may refer to:

- Pedro Rodrigues (hurdler) (born 1971), Portuguese hurdler
- Pedro Rodrigues (footballer)
- Pedro Rodrigues (politician)

== See also ==
- Pedro Rodríguez (disambiguation)
- Pedro Rodrigues Filho, Brazilian serial killer, spree killer, and vigilante
