= Sueño Fútbol =

2016 Colombian television series

- Genre: Sports
- Country of origin: Colombia
- Original language: Spanish
- No. of series: 2

Production
- Running time: 45mins
- Production company: RCN Televisión

Original release
- Release: 6 March – 8 May 2016

Sueño Fútbol was a Colombian football reality television programme shown on RCN Televisión.

The winner of the competition was Juan David Marín, who went on to play professionally in Colombia and Nicaragua with La Equidad and Deportivo Ocotal, respectively. Second place was Jhan Cuero, who played in the first division of Colombian football, also with La Equidad, as well as spending one season in the second division with Bogotá FC. Oleyfrer Rivas finished third, and spent one season in Ecuador's second division side Fuerza Amarilla S.C.
