= Topaze (magazine) =

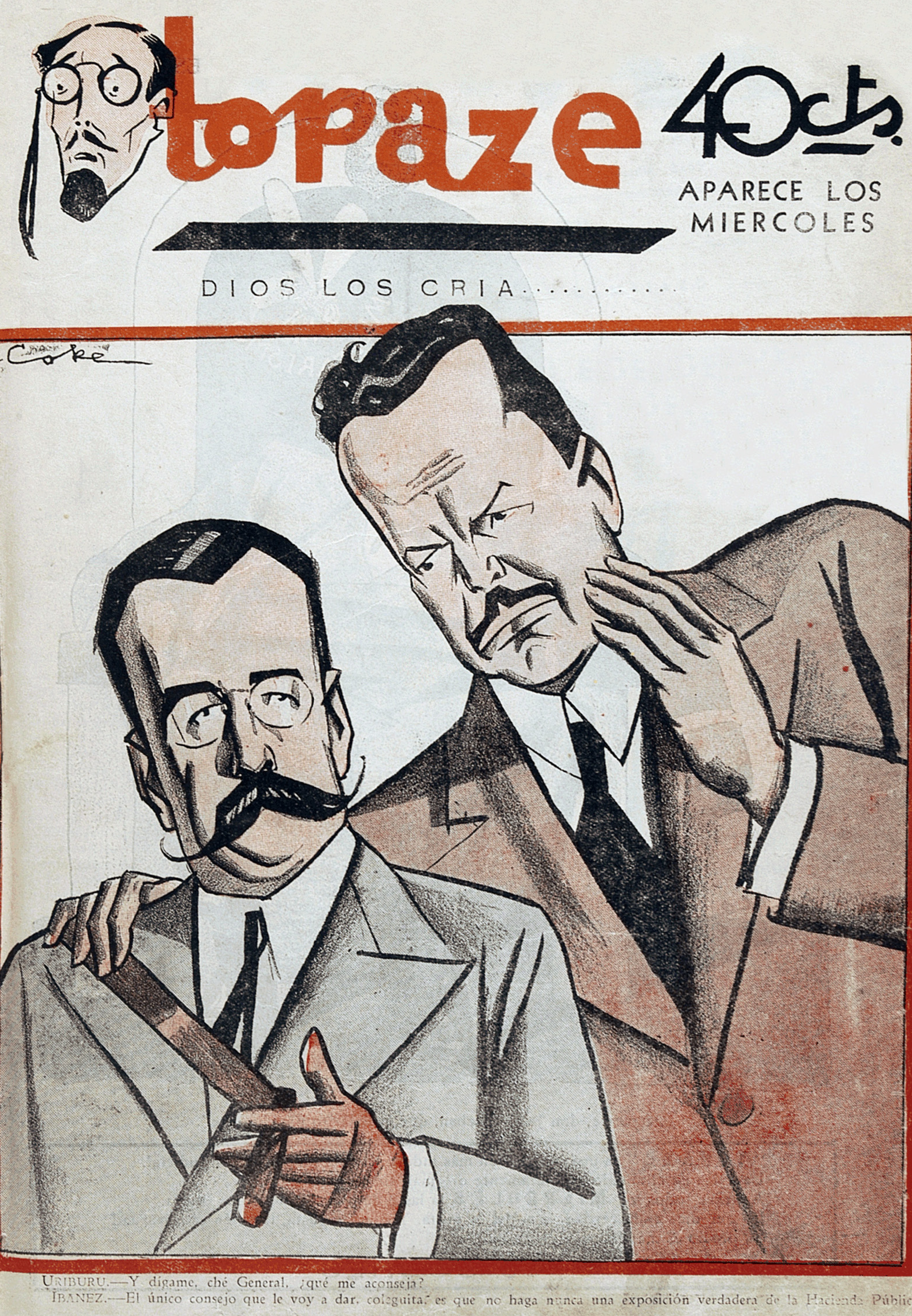
Cover of the first issue of Topaze.

Topaze was a Chilean magazine concerned with current politics and satire. It was named for the French comedy play of the same name. It was established in 1931 by Jorge Délano and the first number was issued in August 1931 shortly after the fall of the regime of Carlos Ibáñez del Campo. Writer Jorge Sanhueza was its first editor. Its editorial stance has been described as independent. On some occasions Topaze was censored for a limited timer or had certain issues withdrawn. The magazine's last number was issued in 1970 despite a 1989 attempt by La Tercera de la Hora to revive it.
