= Jorge Délano Frederick =

Chilean cartoonist, screenwriter, director and actor

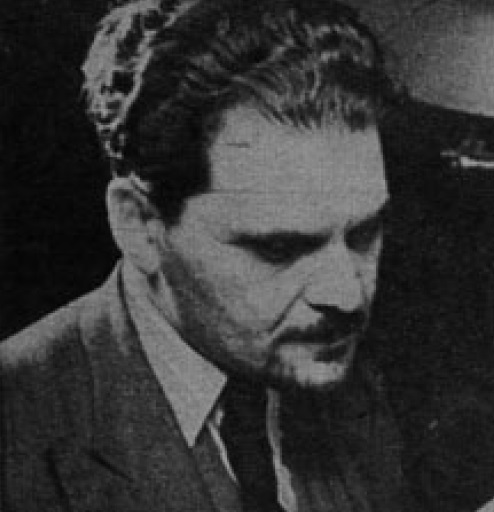
- Délano in 1942
- Born: December 4, 1895; Santiago, Chile
- Died: July 9, 1980 (aged 84); Santiago, Chile
- Occupations: Cartoonist, screenwriter, film director, actor

Jorge Délano Frederick (December 4, 1895 - July 9, 1980) was a Chilean cartoonist, screenwriter, film director, and actor. He was a caricaturist for La Nación, and he won the María Moors Cabot International Journalism Prize in 1952 and the National Prize for Journalism in 1964. In 1931 he established the political satire magazine Topaze.
