= National Prize for Journalism (Chile) =

- Part of the National Prize of Chile
- Sponsored by: Ministry of Education; National Council of Culture and the Arts
- Country: Chile
- First award: 1954

The National Prize for Journalism (Spanish: Premio Nacional de Periodismo), part of the National Prize of Chile, has been awarded since 1954. It was created by Law 11479 in 1953. It was granted annually until 1972, when Law 17595 changed it to a biennial prize.

From 1954 to 1963, it was granted in the categories writing, feature, and photography. In 1964 the drawing category was added. Between 1975 and 1993, mention was made of the winner's category.

Other important prizes in the same category, granted by individuals, are the Lenka Franulic Award (1963), the Embotelladora Andina Award (1979), and the Chilean Security Association Carmen Puelma Award (1994).

== List of winners ==
=== 1954–1972 ===
Year	Editing	Feature	Photography	Drawing
1954	Rafael Maluenda	Luis Hernández Parker	Roberto Aspee	—
1955	Joaquín Lepeley	Hugo Silva	Emiliano Rubio	—
1956	Luis Silva Silva	Tito Mundt	José Valladares	—
1957	René Silva Espejo	Lenka Franulic	Eliodoro Torrente	—
1958	Alex Varela	Armando Lazcano	Fernando Valenzuela Núñez	—
1959	Joaquín Edwards Bello	Carlos Anfruns	Hernán Bernales	—
1960	Avelino Urzúa	Victoriano Reyes Covarrubias	Luis González Núñez	—
1961	Alfonso Lagos	José Monasterio	Félix Rubio	—
1962	Daniel de la Vega	Manuel Gandarillas	Arturo León	—
1963	Francisco Le Dantec	Juan Rodolfo Marín	Alberto Núñez	—
1964	Raúl Morales	Carlos Santander	José Fernández	Jorge Délano (Coke)
1965	Ricardo Boizard	Alfredo Pacheco Barrera	Rolando Gómez Smith	Alfredo Adduard
1966	Juan Emilio Pacull	Eduardo Latorre	Óscar Arriagada	Luis Goyenechea (Lugoze)
1967	Evaldo Hohmann	Fernando Murillo	Enrique Aracena	Osvaldo Salas Veas
1968	Fernando Díaz	Alfonso Meléndez	José Jorquera Herrera	Cayetano Gutiérrez (Zayde)
1969	Víctor Solar	Julio Moreno Toledano	Francisco De Silvestri	Percy Eaglehurst (Percy)
1970	Luis Enrique Délano	Hernán Carmona Vial	Lautaro Alvial Bensen	Guillermo Pavez Reyes
1971	Edgardo Perramon	Moisés Escobar	Guillermo Estay	Oscar Camino
1972	Emilio Filippi	Hugo Goldsack Blanco	Enrique Muñoz Armijo	Enrique Meltcherts

=== Since 1975 ===
- 1975 – Arturo Fontaine Aldunate (Editing)
- 1977 – Andrés Aburto Sotomayor (Feature)
- 1979 – Miguel Rubio Feliz (Photography)
- 1981 – Renzo Pecchenino (Lukas) (Drawing)
- 1983 – Luis Sánchez Latorre (Feature)
- 1985 – Hernán Millas (Editing)
- 1987 – Juan Enrique Lira (Photography)
- 1989 – Cristián Zegers (Editing)
- 1991 – Raquel Correa (Editing)
- 1993 – Pilar Vergara (Editing)
- 1995 – Julio Martínez
- 1997 – Patricia Verdugo
- 1999 – Guillermo Blanco
- 2001 – Tito Castillo
- 2003 – Héctor Olave
- 2005 – Juan Pablo Cárdenas
- 2007 – Faride Zerán
- 2009 – María Olivia Mönckeberg
- 2011 – Sergio Campos
- 2013 – Alipio Vera
- 2015 – Abraham Santibáñez
- 2017 – Alberto Gato Gamboa
