= Graciela Romero =

Chilean journalist and writer (1925–2011)

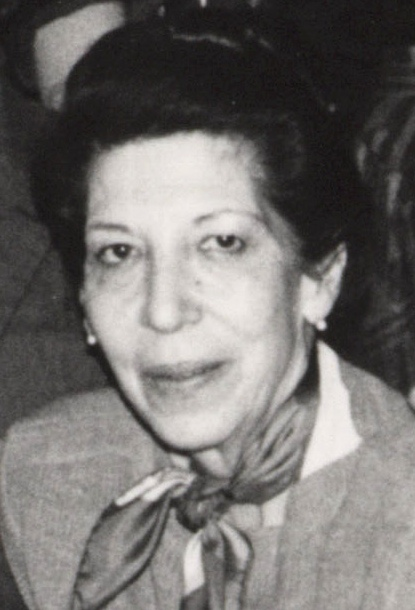
- Born: Graciela María Luisa Romero Piñero; 14 May 1925; Chile
- Died: 4 November 2011 (aged 86); Chile
- Other name: Totó Romero
- Education: Colegio Universitario Inglés
- Occupations: Social worker, journalist, writer
- Spouse: Andrés Rosselló
- Children: Alfonso Roselló Romero
- Parents: Alberto Romero (father); Zulema Piñero (mother)
- Awards: Lenka Franulic Award (1986)

Graciela María Luisa Romero Piñero (14 May 1925 – 4 November 2011), better known by her nickname Totó Romero, was a Chilean social worker, journalist, and writer. She was a recipient of the Lenka Franulic Award.

== Biography ==
The daughter of writer Alberto Romero and the Argentine Zulema Piñero, Graciela Romero was educated at the Colegio Universitario Inglés of Santiago. She was the niece of distinguished journalist María Romero.

At age 21, she married the Spanish citizen Andrés Rosselló, who was 16 years her senior. They separated because he wanted her to stop working, for which she took the car and the driver. "If you want to work, take a micro," he told her. She did not go in a microbus, but in a taxi. The couple had one child, Alfonso Roselló.

Despite being a social worker by profession, she was known nationally for her joint writing with journalist Ximena Torres Cautivo. She worked in various media, most memorably for the magazine Paula. She also covered news of the international jet set for Vanidades.

Romero was an outspoken liberal and feminist, and at one point lost her job at Salvador Hospital for advocating the use of oral contraceptives.

Her health began to decline in 2009 after being treated for lung cancer, and she was required to use an oxygen tank. She died on 4 November 2011.

== Publications ==
- El evento
- El chileno de maleta
- Cómo sobrevivir en Chile después de los 30
- Con el voto a dos manos
