= Juan Pablo Cárdenas Squella =

Chilean journalist (1949–2026)

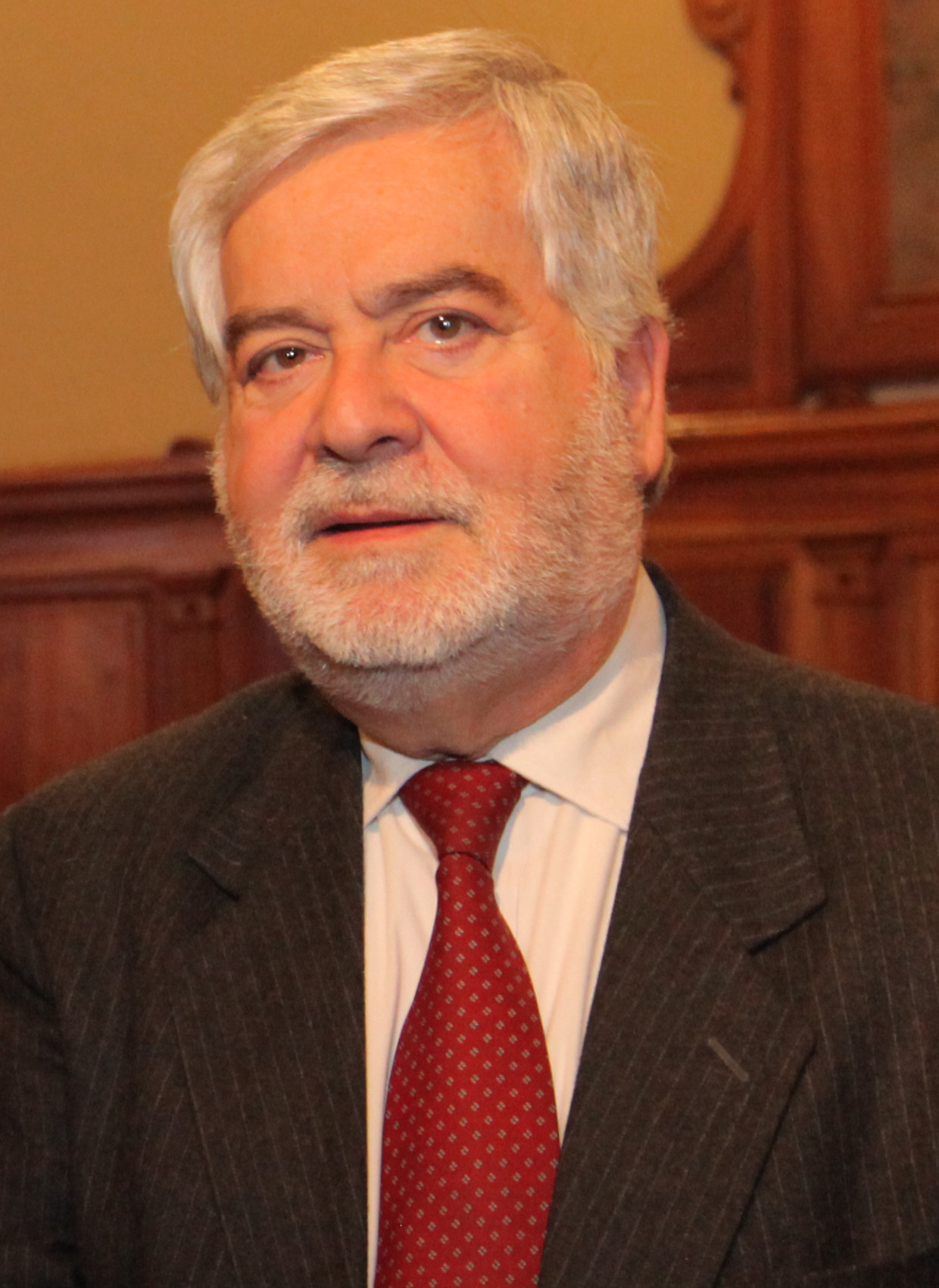
- Born: 1 December 1949; Santiago, Chile
- Died: 11 October 2026 (aged 76); Santiago, Chile
- Education: Pontifical Catholic University of Chile
- Occupation: Journalist
- Awards: Golden Pen of Freedom; World Press Freedom Hero; National Prize for Journalism

Juan Pablo Cárdenas Squella (1 December 1949 – 11 October 2026) was a Chilean journalist and academic who founded and directed multiple periodicals. He won numerous awards for his work defending freedom of the press.

== Life and career ==
Born in Santiago on 1 December 1949, Cárdenas attended the German Lyceum of Santiago and Barros Arana National Boarding School as a child. He studied journalism at the Pontifical Catholic University of Chile; his thesis was titled: "The Press and the Peasant Reality." While he was studying there, he began working for the university's magazine, Debate Universitario, which he would later direct; he left that position in 1973. In 1977, he founded the weekly magazine Análisis, which reported on the corruption and human rights abuses of Augusto Pinochet's government. As a result of his work for Análisis, Cárdenas faced physical and legal harassment. He was detained seven times and, in 1987, sentenced to eighteen months of nighttime prison, during which he spent nights imprisoned and continued working during the day. His nightly commute to prison garnered international attention, and he was accompanied by crowds that included colleagues and the media. One night, American playwright Arthur Miller accompanied him. In November 1989, his house was partially burned down by unknown attackers. He continued to direct Análisis until 1991, when it closed due to declining circulation following the restoration of freedom of the press in 1990 by the government of Patricio Aylwin.

In 1992, he founded the magazine Los Tiempos, which he directed until 1993. In 1994, he became press attaché for the Chilean embassy in Mexico, a position he held until 1999 or February 2000. In September 2000, he became director of the electronic newspaper Primera Línea, managed by La Nación, on the condition that he would be able to do "critical and independent journalism"; La Nación was majority-owned by the government of Chile. He published several articles critical of the government, and according to Cárdenas, he had been director "barely fifteen days" before the Secretary General of Government began pressuring him to resign; on 10 January 2001, he was fired at the government's instigation.

Cárdenas taught at the Pontifical Catholic University of Chile from 1972 to 1973, at the Catholic University of the North from 1974 to 1975, and at ARCIS University in 1990. From 1991, he taught at the School of Journalism at the University of Chile, where he belonged to the Academic Senate. During this time, he also taught briefly at the University of Viña del Mar (1993), the Pontifical Catholic University of Valparaíso (2002–2004), and the University of the Republic (2005). In 2000, he became director of the University Radio of Chile, a position he held for more than eighteen years. He was married with six children.

In 1986, Cárdenas won the Vladimir Herzog Award. In 1987, he won the Golden Pen of Freedom Award for his work for Análisis. In 2000, he was named one of fifty original World Press Freedom Heroes. In 2005, he received Chile's National Prize for Journalism. Cárdenas also received awards from the Latin American Federation of Journalists, the Dutch Association of Journalists, and the Latin American Association for Human Rights, among others.

Cárdenas died of cancer on 11 October 2026, at the age of 76.
