= Patricia Politzer =

Chilean journalist and writer

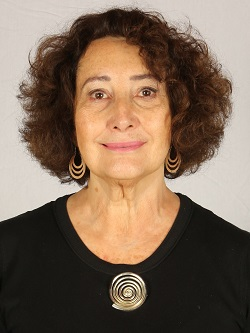

Member of the Constitutional Convention
- In office 4 July 2021 – 4 July 2022
- Constituency: 10th District

Personal details
- Born: Patricia Rosa Politzer Kerekes; 28 February 1952 (age 74) Santiago, Chile
- Spouse: Arturo Navarro
- Children: 2
- Education: University of Chile
- Occupation: Journalist; Writer

Patricia Politzer (February 28, 1952) is a Chilean journalist and writer.

== Biography ==
Politzer was born in Santiago de Chile to Jewish emigrants to Chile who came fleeing the Holocaust; her father emigrated from Czechoslovakia and her mother, Julia Catalina Kerekes, emigrated from Hungary. She studied at the Lycée Français Antoine-de-Saint-Exupéry in Santiago and attended the School of Journalism at the University of Chile. She two daughters, the second one from her marriage to the journalist and cultural manager Arturo Navarro.

== Professional career ==
=== Journalism ===
She was press director of Televisión Nacional de Chile (TVN) between 1991 and 1994. In 2000, she became director of the Director of Communication of the Ministry General Secretariat of the Presidency, a position she held until May 2001, when she was appointed president of the National Television Council, a state-run agency whose function is to oversee the operation of television services in the country.

She was president of the Literary Rights Society (Sadel), member of the Board of the NGO Educación 2020 and advisor to the NGO ComunidadMujer. She was a member of the panel of the political debate show Estado Nacional between 2011 and 2015. She was a founding member of the Chilean Chapter of Transparency International and a professor at the School of Journalism at the University of Chile. In 2017, she received the Lenka Franulic Award.

She has a regular column at the online newspaper El Mostrador and used to be a regularly featured panelist on the Mesa Central debates program on Canal 13, until she quit in November 2020 to run for a spot in the Constituent assembly of Chile.

=== Politics ===
In November 2020, Politzer announced her candidacy for the Constituent assembly of Chile as part of the Independientes No Neutrales political coalition, running on the 10th electoral region, resulting elected to the constituent assembly.

=== Literary works ===
- Miedo en Chile, CESOC, 1985.
- La ira de Pedro y los otros, Planeta, 1988.
- Fear in Chile: lives under Pinochet, Random House, NY, 1989.
- Altamirano, Melquíades-Ediciones B, 1989.
- El libro de Lagos, Ediciones B, 1998.
- Mujeres: la sexualidad secreta, Sudamericana, 1999.
- Chile: ¿de qué estamos hablando? Retrato de una transformación asombrosa, Random House, 2006.
- Bachelet en tierra de hombres, Random House Mondadori, 2010.
- Batuta Rebelde: biografía de Jorge Peña Hen, Random House Mondadori, 2020.
