= Lucía Gevert Parada =

Chilean journalist (1932–2021)

- Born: 2 August 1932; Santiago, Chile
- Died: 19 May 2021 (aged 88)
- Education: Pontifical Catholic University of Chile
- Occupations: Journalist, writer, editor, diplomat
- Spouse: Igor Saavedra Gatica
- Awards: Lenka Franulic Award (1970); John Reitemeyer Prize

Lucía Gevert Parada (2 August 1932 – 19 May 2021) was a Chilean journalist, writer, editor and diplomat to West Germany during the military dictatorship of Augusto Pinochet. She was president of the National Association of Women Journalists, editor of the Mampato supplement of El Mercurio during the 1960s, and president of the International Board on Books for Young People (IBBY) of Chile from 1968 to 1973 and 1980 to 1980. She was a founder of the latter, along with the writers Marcela Paz, Alicia Morel, and Maité Allamand, among others. She was also a participant in the founding of Televisión Nacional de Chile and the children's literature magazine Colibrí.

In 1968 she participated in the Congress of Latin American Women.

During her professional career she has received several honors for her journalistic work, including the Lenka Franulic Award in 1970 and the John Reitemeyer Prize for scientific journalism from the Inter American Press Association. Her husband is Igor Saavedra Gatica, winner of the National Science Award of Chile.

Gevert's first publication in the narrative genre was El puma in 1969, which received mixed reviews. Her literary work has ventured into poetry, short stories, essays, and anthologies, including 1992's El mundo de Amado, where she assembled a juvenile anthology of indigenous legends from Tierra del Fuego. In 2002, IBBY Chile selected three of her stories from El gatito que no sabía ronronear y otros cuentos as the best of 2001.

Gevert died on 19 May 2021, at the age of 88.

== Works ==
- El puma (1969)
- Conversaciones con el Profesor Zahvedruz
- Los cometas y la gravitación universal
- Lo cuenta el Cono Sur : mitos de nuestra tierra

=== As coauthor ===
- Aguas oscuras
- Cuentos cortos de la tierra larga
- El mundo de Amado (1992), compilation of indigenous legends
- Lo cuenta el Cono Sur
- El mar encantado
- El gatito que no sabía ronronear y otros cuentos, with illustrations by Andrés Jullian
- Baile de primavera (1995), with illustrations by Andrés Jullian
- Mitos y leyendas de nuestra América
- Cuentos del fin del mundo
- Los cometas y la gravitación: el hechizo del Halley, series of interviews
