= Alicia Morel =

Chilean writer (1921–2017)

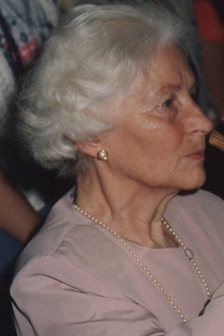
- Born: Alicia Morel Chaigneau; 26 July 1921; Santiago, Chile
- Died: 1 March 2017 (aged 95)
- Occupations: Writer, poet
- Years active: 1938–2017
- Notable work: La Hormiguita Cantora y el Duende Melodía
- Spouse: William Thayer Arteaga
- Awards: Order of Merit of the World Council of Education (1989)

Alicia Morel Chaigneau (26 July 1921 – 1 March 2017) was a Chilean writer, novelist, storyteller, poet, and essayist best known for her work in the field of children's literature and theater for children and puppets.

== Biography ==
=== Early years ===
Alicia Morel was born to a very well-educated family in which she was the eldest of six children. From a very young age she was deeply interested in literature. Her favorite authors were Oscar Wilde, Lewis Carroll, Hans Christian Andersen, Charles Perrault, the Brothers Grimm, and Selma Lagerlöf. It was their work that inspired her to write. Moreover, she felt a great attraction to the outdoors and nature, observing and studying insects, trees, flowers, and the climate when she went out with her siblings to explore the surroundings of their home.

Her father is described as a generous, tender, and authoritarian man, who used to play the cello. The family went through numerous changes throughout Alicia's childhood. As the years went on, she learned to play the piano and began to write her first stories and poems. These were based in the Cajón del Maipo, a place she frequented for its natural beauty. At age 12 she discovered that her vocation was to write. She was encouraged in this by Jorge Zuloaga, a family friend who provided her with books by authors such as James Joyce, Katherine Mansfield, and González Vera.

=== Literary career ===
In 1938, at the young age of 16, Morel began her literary work with a family-published poetry book entitled En el campo y la ciudad, and after this she ventured into various genres such as novels, poetry, relato, Chilean legends, and children's stories. Four years later, Zuloaga invited her to an awards ceremony for the writer Francisco Coloane, for his most famous work, El último grumete de la Baquedano. During this time she worked as a physician's assistant, as she had a great devotion to curing the sick. She also repaired and bound old books.

In 1951, she published her poetry collection Como una raíz de agua, and made a cultural trip to Europe, where she met Gabriela Mistral in Naples, Italy, whom she described as having an aura of strong solitude.

She collaborated with other writers, such as Marcela Paz on Perico trepa por Chile, which was adapted for the theater in 2012.

During the 1950s, two of Morel's best-known characters were born in La Hormiguita Cantora y el Duende Melodía, whose stories "were transmitted from 1954 to 1957 [as] radio-adapted editions for children on Radio Chilena and Radio Cooperativa Vitalicia, [...] adventures which were published in 1956 and 1957." These stories would later be illustrated by her friend, artist Elena Poirier. Around this time she also began to visit schools, where she put on puppet shows, presenting more than 15 stories with dozens of characters.

Morel was one of the founders of International Board on Books for Young People (IBBY) of Chile, together with writers Lucía Gevert Parada, Marcela Paz, and Maité Allamand, among others. She served as vice president of this institution during its early years. She also collaborated on various educational projects, creating a magazine for the ASIMET Compensation Fund and writing for the biannual magazine El Volantín.

== Awards and recognition ==
During her professional career, Morel received several honors, among them the Order of Merit of the World Council of Education in 1989 and two tributes to her career, at the 21st International Fair of Children's and Young Adult Books in 2007 and the Iberoamerican Congress of Language and Children's and Young Adult Literature (Congreso iberoamericano de lengua y literatura infantil y juvenil; CILELJ) in 2010. In the latter year she was selected to represent Chile at the Hans Christian Andersen Awards.

== Personal life ==
Alicia Morel's brother Eduardo Morel Chaignau was the father of Cecilia Morel Montes, twice the First Lady of Chile (from 2010 to 2014, and from 2018 to 2022).

Morel married politician William Thayer Arteaga, with whom she had seven children.

== Works ==
=== Poetry ===
- 1938: En el campo y la ciudad
- 1951: Como una raíz de agua
- 1990: El árbol de los cielos
- 2007: Color del tiempo

=== Novels ===
- 1940: Juanilla, Juanillo y la Abuela
- 1965: El jardín de Dionisio
- 1978: Perico trepa por Chile (as coauthor with Marcela Paz)
- 1988: El viaje de los duendes al otro lado del mundo
- 2001: El fabricante de risas
- 2001: La conquista del rocío
- 2002: El viaje de los invisibles
- 2010: Espejos Paralelos

=== Short stories ===
- 1973: Cuentos de la Pícara Polita
- 1978: Nuestros cuentos (anthology of Chilean authors)
- 1983: Cuentos Araucanos, La gente de la Tierra
- 1983: La noche en la ventana
- 1985: Polita va a la escuela
- 1996: Polita en el bosque
- 1999: Las manchas de Vinca
- 2004: Mozart cuenta la Flauta Mágica, cuento
- 2007: Travesuras de Polita
- 2008: El Cururo incomprendido
- 2010: El secreto del caracol
- 1991: Polita aprende el mundo
- 1991: La Hoja Viajera
- 1991: Cuentos de tesoros y monedas de oro
- 1992: Una aguja y un dedal
- 1993: Cuentos de la lluvia
- 1994: Aventuras del Duende Melodía
- 1994: El baile de los cantaritos
- 1994: La cartera azul y Amigos del bosque
- 1978: El Increíble Mundo de Llanca
- 1995: El cururo incomprendido
- 2015: Cuentos de la Panchita

=== Translations ===
- 1990: Translation of The King of the Golden River by John Ruskin
- 1981: Translation of The Little Prince, by Antoine de Saint-Exupéry
- 1982: Translation of The Garden Party by Katherine Mansfield

=== Other ===
- 1956: La Hormiguita Cantora y el Duende Melodía
- 1977: ¿Quién soy? (essay)
- 1984: Los viajes misteriosos de María (essay)
- 1986: La flauta encantada (puppetry and theater for children)
- 1990: Variaciones Literarias (essays on Virginia Woolf and Katherine Mansfield)
- 1991: Hagamos títeres (teaching text and five works for puppets)
- 1995: La Era del Sueño (essay)
- 1996: Leyendas bajo la Cruz del Sur
- 2004: La Biblia contada para ti (as coauthor with Jacqueline Balcells)
- 2005: La última polilla del otoño
- 2006: Una mariposa en apuros, El baile del Picaflor
- 2007: Polita en el bosque
- 2009: El Paraguas mágico
- 2009: Polita Aprende el mundo y Polita va a la escuela
