= Blanca Tejos Muñoz =

Chilean journalist

- Born: Chile
- Other names: White
- Occupations: Journalist, writer, teacher
- Years active: 1941 – present
- Spouse: Jesús Aurtenechea Léniz
- Awards: Lenka Franulic Award (1964); Helena Rubinstein Award (1967)

Blanca Tejos Muñoz is a Chilean journalist, writer, and teacher, best known for winning the Lenka Franulic Award in 1964 and the Helena Rubinstein Award in 1967.

== Career ==
Blanca Tejos Muñoz's journalistic career started at the newspaper El Mercurio in 1941 as the third woman journalist to work for the publication in its history. She continued to work for the paper until 1980.

In 1964 she won the second prize of the Carlos Septién Journalism Award from the Instituto de Cultura Hispánica of Madrid. She carried out guild activities within the Chilean Journalists Association, being elected president of the Metropolitan Council in 1976. In the field of narrative, in 1997 she published Miscelánea cuentos y crónicas under the pseudonym White.

She married Jesús Aurtenechea Léniz, who died on 11 March 2010.
