= Patricia Verdugo =

Chilean journalist, writer and human rights activist

- Born: Patricia del Cármen Verdugo Aguirre; 20 October 1947; Santiago, Chile
- Died: 13 January 2008 (aged 60); Santiago, Chile
- Spouse: Edgardo Marín
- Children: 3

Patricia del Cármen Verdugo Aguirre (20 October 1947 – 13 January 2008) was a Chilean journalist, writer and human rights activist. She focused much of her investigative reporting on the human rights abuses committed by the military dictatorship of Augusto Pinochet. She was a recipient of the National Prize for Journalism and the Maria Moors Cabot Prizes.

== Early life ==
Verdugo was born in 1947. She earned her bachelor's degree in journalism from the Pontifical Catholic University of Chile.

== Career ==
She began working for a number of well known Chilean media outlets beginning in 1969. Her magazine employers included Hoy and Apsi.

Though she continued to work in magazines, Verdugo ultimately became well known for her books, many of which focused on human rights abuses during the military regime of Gen. Pinochet, which lasted from 1973 until 1990. Verdugo's own father was killed by the Chilean secret police in 1976. Through her work and investigative reporting, Verdugo became one of Pinochet's harshest critics.

Her most well known book, Los Zarpazos del Puma (Clawings of the Puma, was published in 1985, while Pinochet was still in power. The book recounts the extrajudicial murders of more than 70 members of the Chilean opposition between the months of October to November in 1973, shortly after Pinochet took power. The killings were carried out by a Chilean military unit called the "caravan of death," which was tasked with killing political prisoners and other "enemies" of Pinochet.

Los Zarpazos del Puma was banned by the Pinochet government when it was first released. However, black market copies were widely sold on the streets of major cities, such as Santiago, despite the ban. The book became, perhaps, the most widely read in Chile's history.

Nearly all of the claims that Verdugo put forth in Los Zarpazos del Puma was later verified as factual and correct as the result of an investigation by Chilean Judge Juan Guzman, who prosecuted Augusto Pinochet for the murder of opponents.

== Death ==
Patricia Verdugo died of gallbladder cancer on 13 January 2008 at Catholic University Hospital in Santiago, Chile.
