= Marina de Navasal =

Chilean journalist, television presenter, and radio announcer (1922 - 2016)

- Born: Marina Kunstmann Oettinger; 11 May 1922; Valdivia, Chile
- Died: 25 January 2016 (aged 93); Machalí, Chile
- Occupation(s): Journalist, television presenter, radio announcer
- Employers: Las Últimas Noticias; El Mercurio; Canal 13
- Spouse: José María Navasal
- Children: Joaquín, Ximena
- Awards: Lenka Franulic Award (1985); Orbe Award (1995)

Marina Kunstmann Oettinger (11 May 1922 – 25 January 2016), better known as Marina de Navasal, was a Chilean journalist, television presenter, and radio announcer of German descent.

== Biography ==
Marina Kunstmann Oettinger was the fourth daughter of Arturo Kunstmann Gerkens and Inés Oettinger. After marrying Spanish journalist José María Navasal, she began to sign with his surname. The couple had two children, Joaquín and Ximena, who both became journalists.

Marina de Navasal began her journalism career in 1945, at the newspaper Las Últimas Noticias, and later at El Mercurio de Santiago. She was also a columnist for the newspapers El Mercurio de Valparaíso and El Rancagüino. In 1955 she founded the news service Agencia Informativa Orbe, together with Alfredo Valdés Loma, Andrés Aburto, and her husband. She was a columnist for the magazines Ecran (of which she was director from 1960 to 1964) and TV Guía.

On television, she was a panelist for the Canal 13 program Almorzando en el Trece (1974–2000) and announcer for Radio Prat, both together with her husband José María. On 29 July 1981 the Navasal/Kunstmann team provided live commentary for the marriage of Prince Charles and Diana Spencer for Canal 13.

In 1985 she won the Lenka Franulic Award, and in 1995 she and her husband received the Orbe Award.

Marina de Navasal was widowed in 1999, and died on 25 January 2016, at her home in Machalí.
