= Yolanda Montecinos =

Chilean journalist, writer and television commentator

Yolanda del Carmen Montecinos Pineda (1927–2007) was a Chilean journalist, writer, and television commentator.

Pineda was born 12 December 1927, in Curanilahue. She earned the Lenka Franulic Award in 1980. She died 7 September 2007.
