= Pilar Vergara =

Chilean journalist (born 1947)

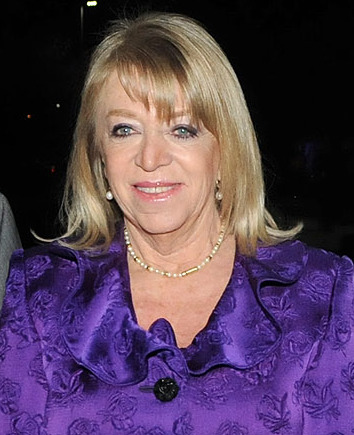
- Vergara at the anniversary of La Segunda in 2011
- Born: María del Pilar Vergara Tagle; 23 June 1947 (age 79)
- Education: Pontifical Catholic University of Chile
- Occupation: Journalist
- Parents: Ruperto Vergara Santa Cruz (father); Olga Tagle (mother)
- Awards: National Prize for Journalism (1993)

Pilar Vergara (born 23 June 1947) is a Chilean journalist, winner of the National Prize for Journalism in 1993.

== Career ==
Pilar Vergara is the daughter of Ruperto Vergara Santa Cruz, a publicist and farmer from La Calera, and Olga Tagle. She is the granddaughter of distinguished jurist and diplomat Ruperto Vergara Bulnes. She studied at the Pontifical Catholic University of Chile (UC), graduating in 1968.

Subsequently, she worked at Canal 13, on the program Pasado meridiano, and at the newspaper El Mercurio, where she participated in the Sunday Reports section. At that paper, she was also the editor of Section D reports. She was a professor of journalistic techniques at the journalism school of the Catholic University.

In 1981, Vergara joined the newspaper La Segunda, along with Cristián Zegers. Initially, she worked as editor-in-chief, later assuming the position of editor of information services. In 2006, after the appointment of Zegers at El Mercurio, she assumed the position of director of the newspaper, a job she held until 2011.

In 2012, she joined the board of Universidad Mayor.

Vergara currently writes a Sunday column for El Mercurio.

== Awards ==
- 1988 – Lenka Franulic Award
- 1991 – Embotelladora Andina Award
- 1993 – National Prize for Journalism
- 2001 – Distinguished Alumna Award from the UC Alumni Association
- 2003 – Carmen Puelma Award

Preceded by Cristián Zegers Ariztía	Director of La Segunda; 2006–2011	Succeeded by Víctor Carvajal Navarrete
