= Juan David Marín =

Colombian footballer (born 1998)

Personal information
- Full name: Juan David Marín Correa
- Date of birth: 4 March 1998 (age 28)
- Place of birth: Manizales, Caldas, Colombia
- Height: 1.77 m (5 ft 10 in)
- Position: Forward

Team information
- Current team: Real Frontera

Youth career
- Formadores
- Pedreguer
- Somnus
- 2016–2019: La Equidad

Senior career*
Years	Team	Apps	(Gls)
2019	La Equidad	3	(0)
2022	Ocotal	28	(0)
2023–2024	Arsenal SAO		
2024–	Real Frontera	0	(0)
- * Club domestic league appearances and goals as of 23:04, 8 October 2024 (UTC)

Juan David Marín Correa (born 4 March 1998) is a Colombian footballer currently playing as a forward for Venezuelan side Real Frontera.

== Club career ==
=== Early career ===
Marín began his career with Club Deportivo Formadores, before playing for Pedreguer and footballing academy Somnus in Spain and Mexico respectively.

=== La Equidad ===
Marín was a contestant on Colombian television show Sueño Fútbol, broadcast on RCN Televisión in 2016. Having won the competition, and being offered a contract by a number of first-division Colombian football clubs, he decided to join La Equidad, and explained in an interview with Pulzo that he had made his choice based on La Equidad's offer being "the most complete contract" that "best suited the needs of a young man of my age".

After two years with the under-20 squad, Marín spent the end of the 2018 season in Mexico, training with Potros UAEM, as was part of his agreement with La Equidad. He was promoted to the first team in January 2019, and featured in a pre-season friendly against Deportivo Pasto, before making his debut in August of the same year, coming on as a substitute for Armando Vargas in a 2–1 Categoría Primera A loss to Cúcuta Deportivo.

=== Later career ===
After a break from football, he joined Nicaraguan club Deportivo Ocotal in February 2022. After less than a year with the club, he departed, moving to Honduras to sign with Arsenal SAO-Cantarranas in the Honduran Liga Nacional de Ascenso, the country's second division.

== International career ==
Though never called up to represent Colombia at any level in football, Marín represented the nation in minifootball at the Under-23 WMF World Cup in 2021, as Colombia beat the Czech Republic in the final to win the competition.

== Career statistics ==
=== Club ===
As of 11 August 2023.

Appearances and goals by club, season and competition
Club	Season	League			Cup		Continental		Other		Total	
Club	Season	Division	Apps	Goals	Apps	Goals	Apps	Goals	Apps	Goals	Apps	Goals
La Equidad	2019	Categoría Primera A	3	0	0	0	0	0	0	0	3	0
Ocotal	2021–22	Liga Primera de Nicaragua	14	0	0	0	–		0	0	14	0
Ocotal	2022–23	Liga Primera de Nicaragua	14	0	0	0	–		0	0	14	0
Ocotal	Total		28	0	0	0	0	0	0	0	28	0
Career total			31	0	0	0	0	0	0	0	31	0
