= Posada del Corregidor =

Building in Santiago, Chile

Coordinates: 33°26′04″S 70°38′53″W

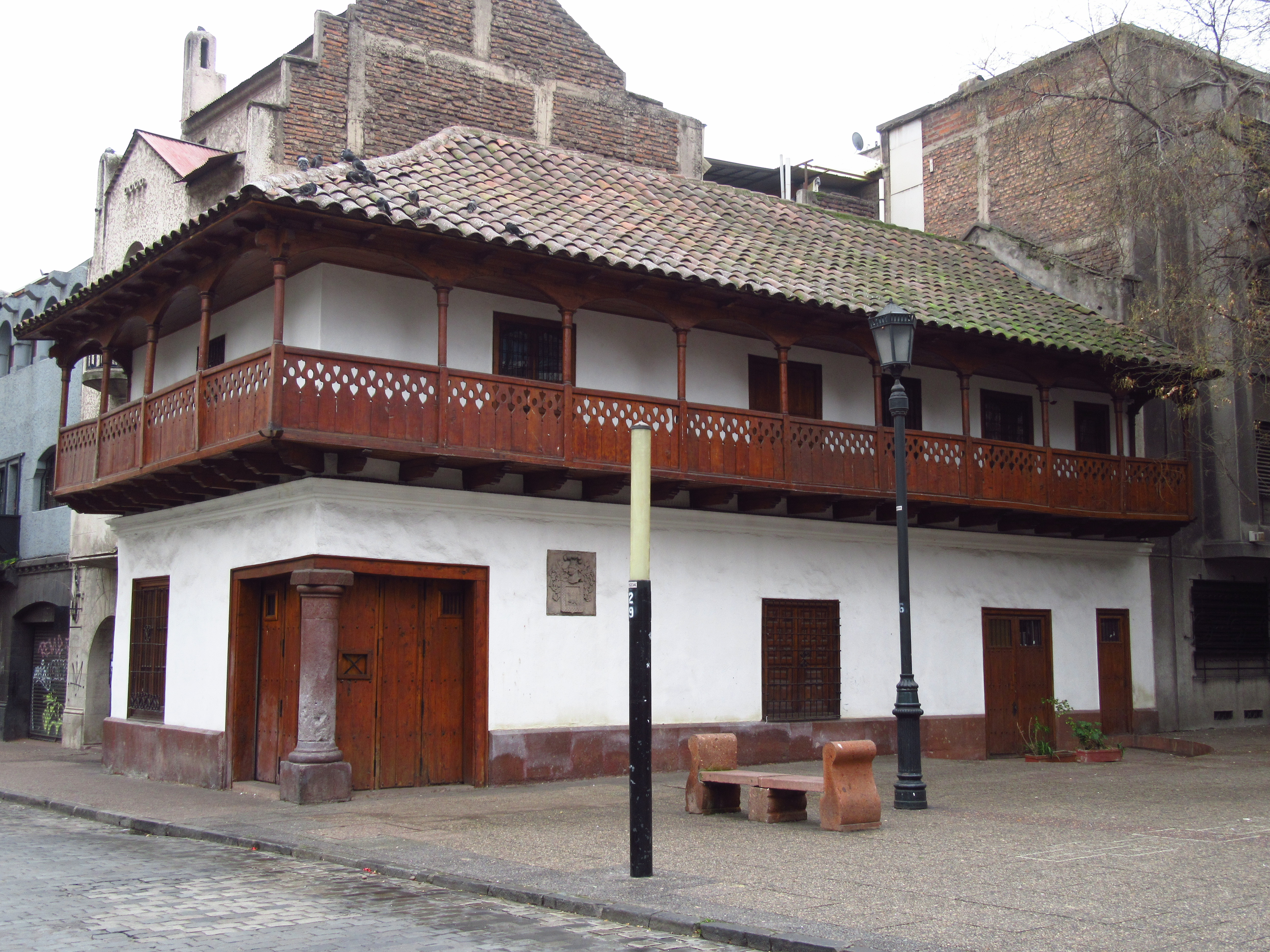
- Interactive map of the Posada del Corregidor area

General information
- Location: Santiago, Chile

The Posada del Corregidor is a building located at the corner of Corregidor Zañartu and Esmeralda streets, in downtown Santiago, Chile. It was declared as a National Historic Monument in 1970.

== History ==
The house was built in the Mid-18th Century, and in the 19th Century it was known as La Filarmónica because of the ballroom that was installed in 1830.

In 1928 Darío Zañartu purchased the property to be used as a place of reminiscence of the colonial era. The name Posada del Corregidor was given by him in honor of the corregidor Luis Manuel de Zañartu, who was unrelated to the building. Due to the lobbying of Darío Zañartu, the municipality of Santiago created an adjacent small square and installed a fountain, which decorates the square.

The Posada del Corregidor was the hub for the bohemian lifestyle in Santiago in the 1930s and the 1940s, housing a bar and ballrooms.

The house was sold to the Banco del Trabajo in 1979, which undertook a complete restoration, and in 1985 was given in commodate to the municipality of Santiago, which used it as a cultural center to the spread of traditional customs, hosting activities ranging from art exhibitions to literary meetings.

The second floor was damaged by the 2010 Chile earthquake, leaving it unusable, which caused a restoration project that began at the end of 2012. The project includes the addition of a coffee shop and a house's basement art gallery.

== Description ==
The two-storey building is a corner house with a rectangular plan. The building features a cantilevered full-length balcony supported by carved corbel ends of exposed wooden beams. The balcony is enclosed by an openwork wood railing and its 14 posts support the projecting roof. The original recessed corner entrance was enclosed by two rustic plank doors, which are separated by a stone corner column. The walls are of adobe and is roofed with Spanish colonial roof tiles.
