= Fortín Mapocho =

- Front page of Fortín Mapocho's iconic 11 October 1988 edition. Front page of Fortín Mapocho's iconic 11 October 1988 edition.
- Type: Daily newspaper
- Format: Tabloid
- Founded: 1947
- Language: Spanish
- Headquarters: Santiago, Chile

Fortín Mapocho (Mapocho Small Stronghold in English) was a daily newspaper, and now a Chilean weekly electronic publication written by socialists who stand in the Allendista tradition, and who are critical of the Concertacionista socialists that presently govern the country.
