= Pedro-Rodríguez =

- municipality
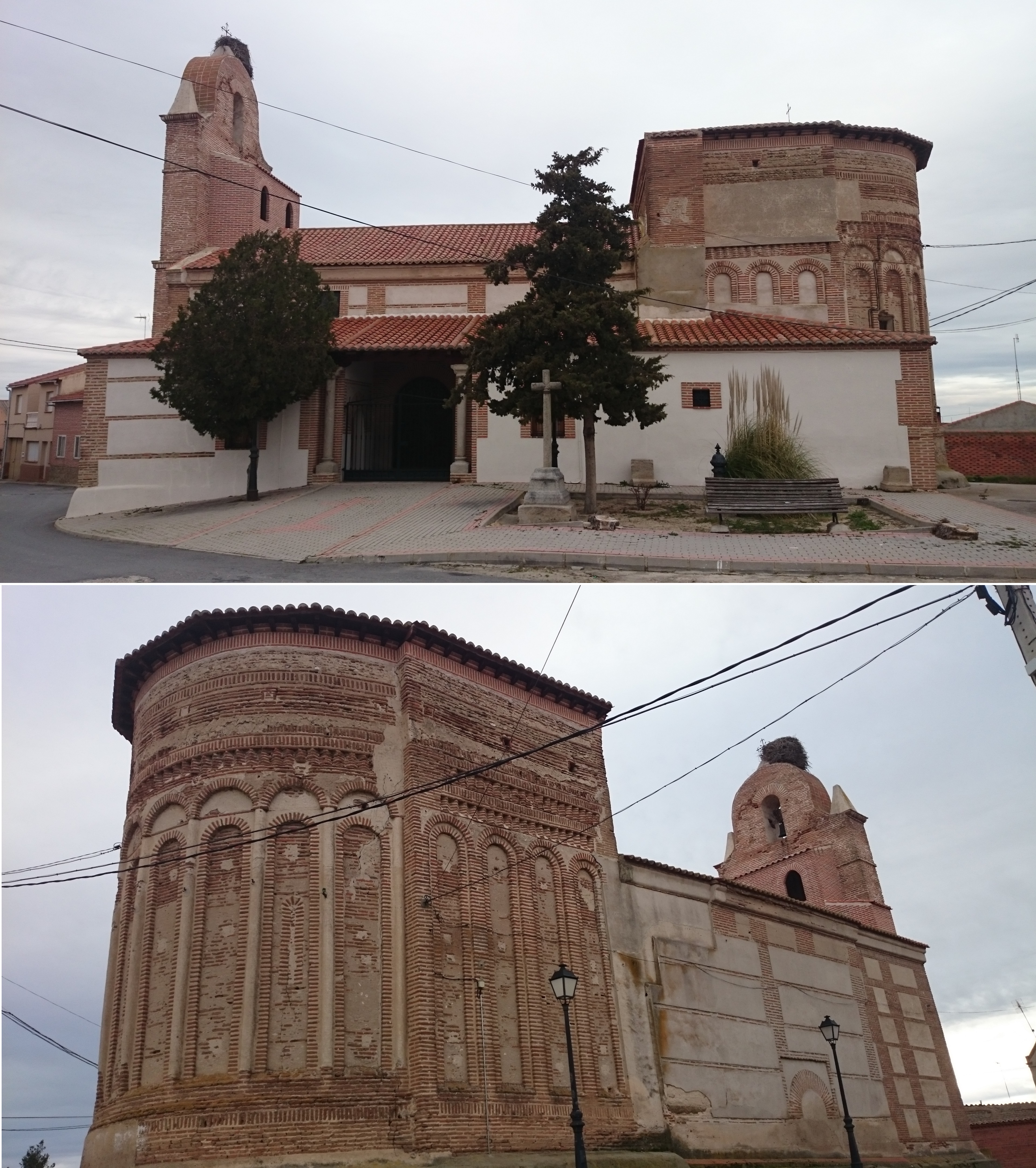
- San Pedro Apostol Church, Pedro Rodríguez

- Flag Coat of arms

- Location in Spain. Pedro-Rodríguez (Spain)
- Coordinates: 40°56′13″N 4°47′06″W
- Country: Spain
- Autonomous community: Castile and León
- Province: Ávila
- Municipality: Pedro-Rodríguez

Area
  - Total: 14 km^{2} (5.4 sq mi)

Population (2025-01-01)
  - Total: 131
  - Density: 9.4/km^{2} (24/sq mi)
- Time zone: UTC+1 (CET)
  - Summer (DST): UTC+2 (CEST)
- Website: Official website

Pedro-Rodríguez is a municipality located in the province of Ávila, Castile and León, Spain.

== Population ==
Historical population
Year	Pop.	±% p.a.
2023	135	—
2024	134	−0.74%
2025	131	−2.24%
Source: INE
