= Juan Rodolfo Marín =

Governor of Coquimbo Department
- In office 4 November 1952 – 4 November 1958
- Preceded by: Jorge Marín Garay
- Succeeded by: Carlos Alberto Castex Taborga

Councillor of Coquimbo
- In office May 1950 – 4 November 1952

Personal details
- Born: 1909 Coquimbo, Chile
- Died: 10 April 1967 (aged 57–58) Santiago, Chile
- Party: Agrarian Labor Party
- Spouse: Ilda Arqueros Espinoza
- Children: Juan Gutenberg
- Occupation: Journalist, politician

Juan Rodolfo Marín (1909 – 10 April 1967) was a Chilean journalist and politician.

== Career ==
Juan Rodolfo Marín started in journalism when he joined the Coquimban newspaper El Progreso. On 2 June 1942, he founded the newspaper El Regional, of which he remained the director until 1952 when he was succeeded by Víctor Medina Díaz.

He served in the Agrarian Labor Party, and was elected councillor of the Municipality of Coquimbo by said party in the 1950 municipal elections. He resigned this position in 1952 when he was appointed Governor of Coquimbo Department by the newly elected President Carlos Ibáñez del Campo. Marín served in that position throughout his presidency, until 4 November 1958.

In 1963 he was awarded the National Prize for Journalism, with mention in the Feature category. The following year the Municipality of Coquimbo named him an Illustrious Son, and that September he published the text Historia de la Pampilla that recounts the history of the Coquimban Pampilla Festival.

== Personal life ==
Juan Rodolfo Marín was married to Ilda Arqueros Espinoza, with whom he had one son, Juan Gutenberg.

Marín died at the San Juan de Dios Hospital in Santiago on 10 April 1967.
