= Silvia Pinto =

Chilean journalist and politician

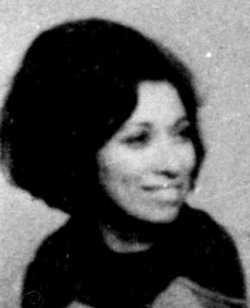
- 1973

Deputy of the Republic of Chile
- In office 15 May 1973 – 21 September 1973
- Constituency: 7th Departmental Association (Santiago)

Personal details
- Born: Silvia Emiliana Pinto Torres; 31 May 1937 Santiago, Chile
- Died: 9 December 1982 (aged 45) La Serena, Chile
- Cause of death: Plane crash
- Party: National Party
- Spouse: Daniel Galleguillos
- Parents: Oscar Pinto López (father); Matilde Torres Puerta de Vera (mother)
- Education: University of Chile
- Occupation: Journalist, politician
- Awards: Lenka Franulic Award (1969)

Silvia Emiliana Pinto Torres (31 May 1937 – 9 December 1982) was a Chilean journalist and politician. She was the daughter of Óscar Pinto López and Matilde Torres Puerta de Vera, and was married to journalist Daniel Galleguillos, with whom she had three daughters.

== Professional career ==
Silvia Pinto completed her secondary studies at the Liceo Integral #2. She later studied journalism at the University of Chile. After graduating, she worked as a reporter for the Education section of the newspaper La Nación in 1959, and held the same position at El Mercurio from 1965 to 1973.

After the 1973 military coup, she worked as a press attaché for the Chilean embassy in Buenos Aires . In 1975, she returned to her country to assume the directorship of the newly-created newspaper El Cronista, which replaced La Patria and was in existence until 1980, when it was replaced by the relaunch of La Nación.

She was a member of the Chilean Journalists Association and in 1969 received the Lenka Franulic Award from the National Association of Women Journalists.

== Political career ==
In the parliamentary elections of March 1973, Pinto was chosen as a deputy for the 7th Departmental Association, First District of Santiago, for the term 1973–1977. She represented the National Party, and was part of the Latin American Education and Public Education commissions. She was also part of special commissions investigating the operation of the Juntas de Abastecimientos y Precios, and collecting background information on the reform of the educational system proposed by President Salvador Allende.

== Death ==
Silvia Pinto was among the 42 passengers aboard Aeronor Flight 304 that crashed near La Serena's La Florida Airport on 9 December 1982. Like the rest of the aircraft's occupants, Pinto was killed immediately. The journalist was on a trip to Copiapó as a press consultant for Banco de Crédito e Inversiones.

That year she was posthumously given the Embotelladora Andina Award.
