= María Romero Cordero =

Chilean journalist and film critic

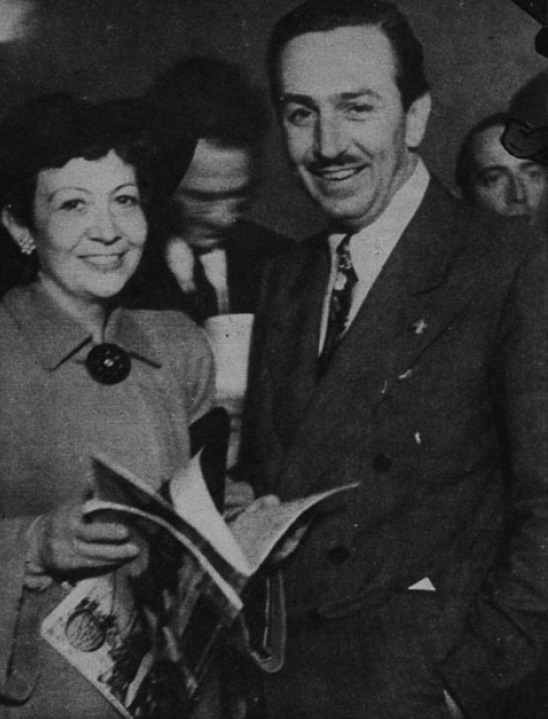
- Romero and Walt Disney circa 1942
- Born: 2 April 1909; Santiago, Chile
- Died: 14 August 1989 (aged 80); Santiago, Chile
- Education: University of Chile
- Occupation: Journalist
- Relatives: Alberto Romero (brother); Graciela Romero (niece)
- Awards: Lenka Franulic Award (1972)

María Romero Cordero (2 April 1909 – 14 August 1989) was a Chilean journalist and film critic. She is considered to be one of the pioneers of film and entertainment journalism in her country and Latin America. She was a recipient of the Lenka Franulic Award.

== Biography ==
María Romero Cordero was the sister of writer Alberto Romero and the aunt of journalist Graciela Romero.

She studied for some time in English at the Faculty of Philosophy and Education at the University of Chile, and later did postgraduate work in preschool education at Mills College in the San Francisco Bay Area, thanks to a scholarship arranged by educator Amanda Labarca. She had the opportunity to visit Hollywood, the cradle of the American film industry, an experience that would influence her later career.

She had sentimental relationships with writer Manuel Rojas and the literary critic Raúl Silva Castro, but never married or had children.

== Professional career ==
On her return to Chile in the late 1930s, she was hired as secretary to the writer Luis Enrique Délano, then as director of the magazine Ecran, where she began to participate in interviews and columns on film. In 1939 she replaced Délano as director of Ecran, giving it her seal as a magazine dedicated to film on feminine and literary subjects. Romero remained in charge until 1960.

Between 1961 and 1963 she lived in the United States, and on her return she worked for a long time as a film commentator for the newspaper El Mercurio. She later appeared on Televisión Nacional de Chile (TVN), where she became known for her cinematic critiques on the news program 60 Minutos.

In 1972 she won the Lenka Franulic Award for journalism.
