= María Olivia Mönckeberg =

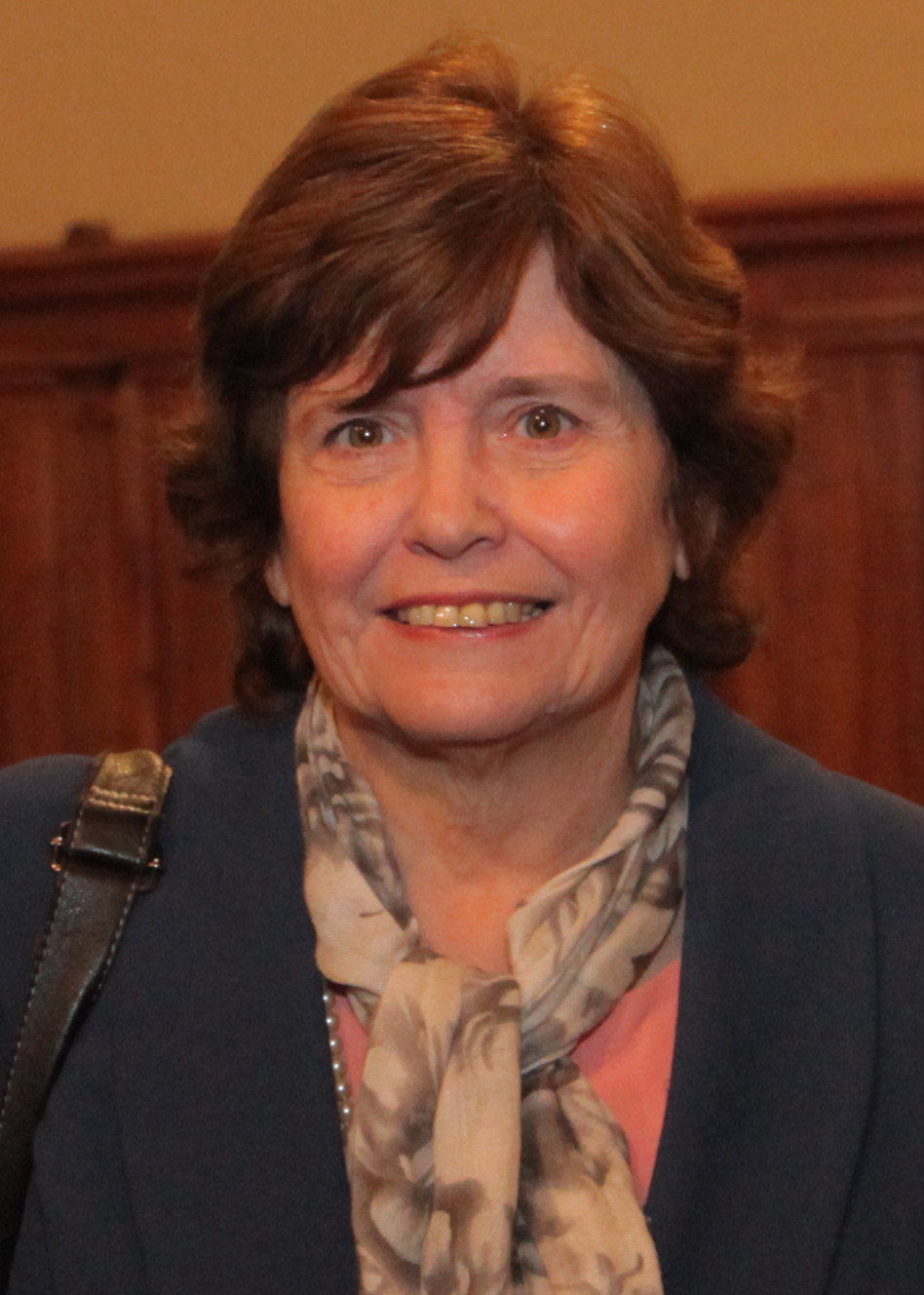
- Born: María Olivia Mönckeberg Pardo; 29 May 1944 (age 82); Santiago, Chile
- Education: Catholic University
- Occupation: Journalist
- Awards: National Prize for Journalism (2009)

María Olivia Mönckeberg Pardo (born 29 May 1944) is a Chilean journalist, essayist, and academic. She received the National Prize for Journalism in 2009.

She is a full professor at the University of Chile and has been the director of its Institute of Communication and Image (ICEI) since 2010. Her work has focused on investigative journalism, and she has written several books which caused great impact at the time of their publication.

== Professional career ==
In 1972 María Olivia Mönckeberg qualified as a journalist at the Catholic University of Chile. A year earlier, in 1971, she had begun professional work at her alma mater's magazine, Debate Universitario.

In September 1973, she joined the magazine Ercilla, where she worked until the beginning of 1977. That year she became one of the founders of Hoy magazine, where she remained until 1981 as editor of Economy and Society. She then joined the political magazine Análisis, opposed to the military dictatorship, where she was editor-in-chief and deputy director until 1987.

During the 1980s she was the founder of the Women for Life Movement, and in 1984 she received the Louis Lyons Award for Conscience and Integrity in Journalism, granted by the Nieman Foundation of Harvard University.

In 1987 Mönckeberg joined the newspaper La Época, where she worked until March 1990, when she became editor-in-chief of La Nación, a newspaper where she was in charge of Sunday political interviews from 1994 to 1998. She was also press director of Radio Nacional from 1992 to 1994.

At the same time, she held various positions in the Chilean Journalists Association; she was national counselor from 1985 to 1990, member of the National Board, and president of the Freedom of Expression Commission from 1985 to 1988.

She is also a founding member of the Council of the Book and Reading Observatory, formed in July 2012 by the University of Chile and the Chilean Book Chamber, and joined the Advisory Board of the Pluralism Studies Fund of the National Commission for Scientific and Technological Research (CONICYT), from 2009 to 2011.

== Academic career ==
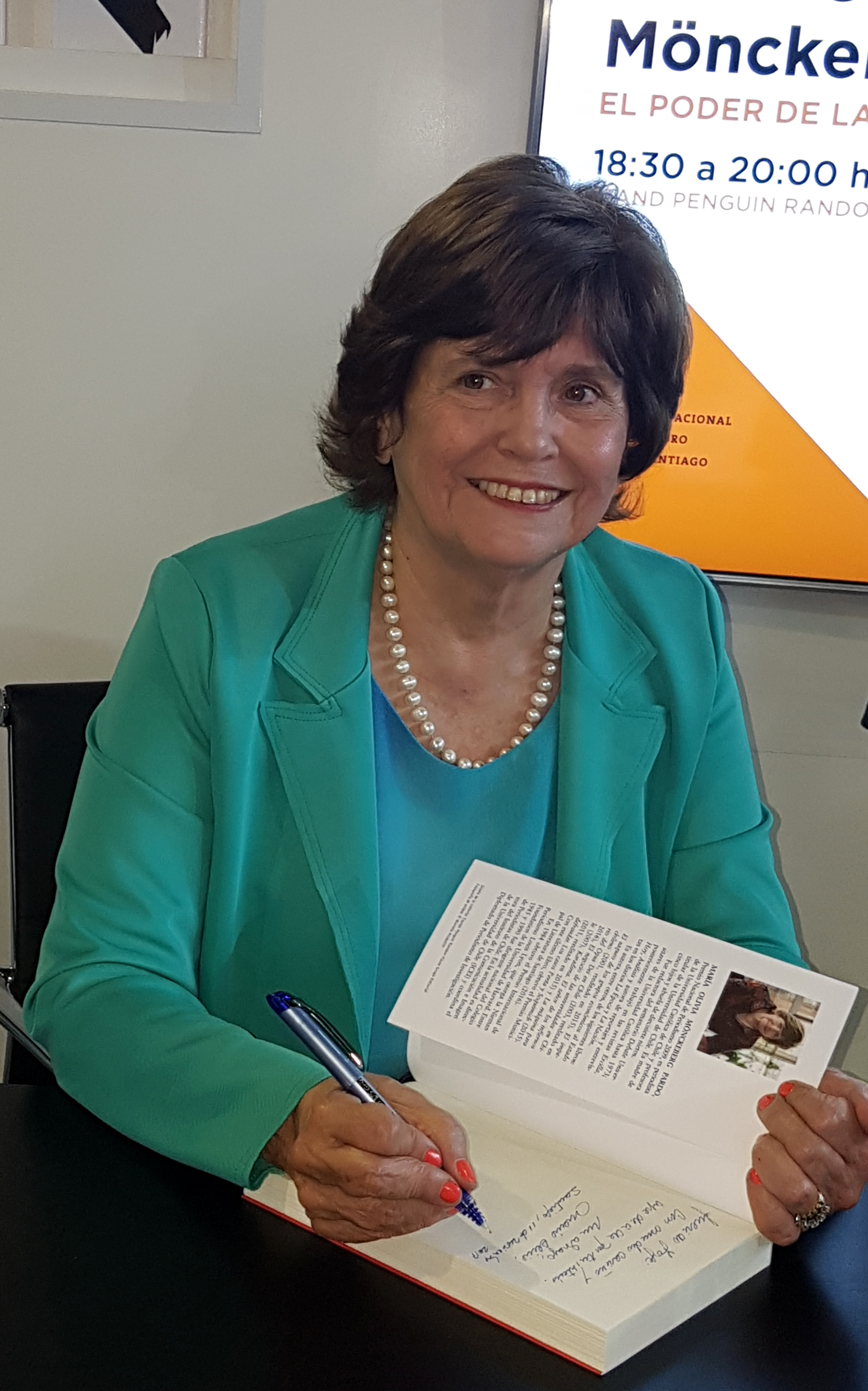
Mönckeberg at FILSA 2017

Mönckeberg is a professor of the University of Chile, and has been director of its Institute of Communication and Image (ICEI) since 2010. She was re-elected for her second term (2014–2018) in June 2014. She holds the chairs of ethics and journalistic treatments and investigative journalism at the School of Journalism. She also coordinates ICEI's Diploma in Investigative Journalism.

== Publications ==
- Crimen bajo estado de sitio, Editorial Emisión (1986)
- El saqueo de los grupos económicos al Estado de Chile, Ediciones B (2001)
- El imperio del Opus Dei en Chile, Ediciones B (2003). She released an updated version in 2016 under the Debate imprint.
- La privatización de las universidades. Una historia de dinero, poder e influencias, La Copa Rota (2005)
- El negocio de las universidades en Chile, Random House Mondadori (2007)
- Los magnates de la prensa, Random House Mondadori (2009)
- Karadima. El señor de los infiernos, Random House Mondadori (2011)
- Con fines de lucro, Random House Mondadori (2013)
- La máquina para defraudar. Casos Penta y Soquimich, Penguin Random House (2015)
- El poder de la UDI. 50 años del gremialismo en Chile, Debate (2017)

== Awards and recognitions ==
- 1984, Louis Lyons Award for Conscience and Integrity in Journalism, granted by the Nieman Foundation
- 2006, Finalist for the Altazor Award with La privatización de las universidades
- 2009, National Prize for Journalism
- 2011, Finalist for the Altazor Award with Karadima. El señor de los infiernos
- 2013, N'aitún Award, granted by the Artists Pro Ecology Cultural Corporation
- 2016, Santiago Municipal Literature Award for La máquina para defraudar. Casos Penta y Soquimich
