= Paula Escobar =

Chilean editor and columnist

Paula Escobar Chavarría
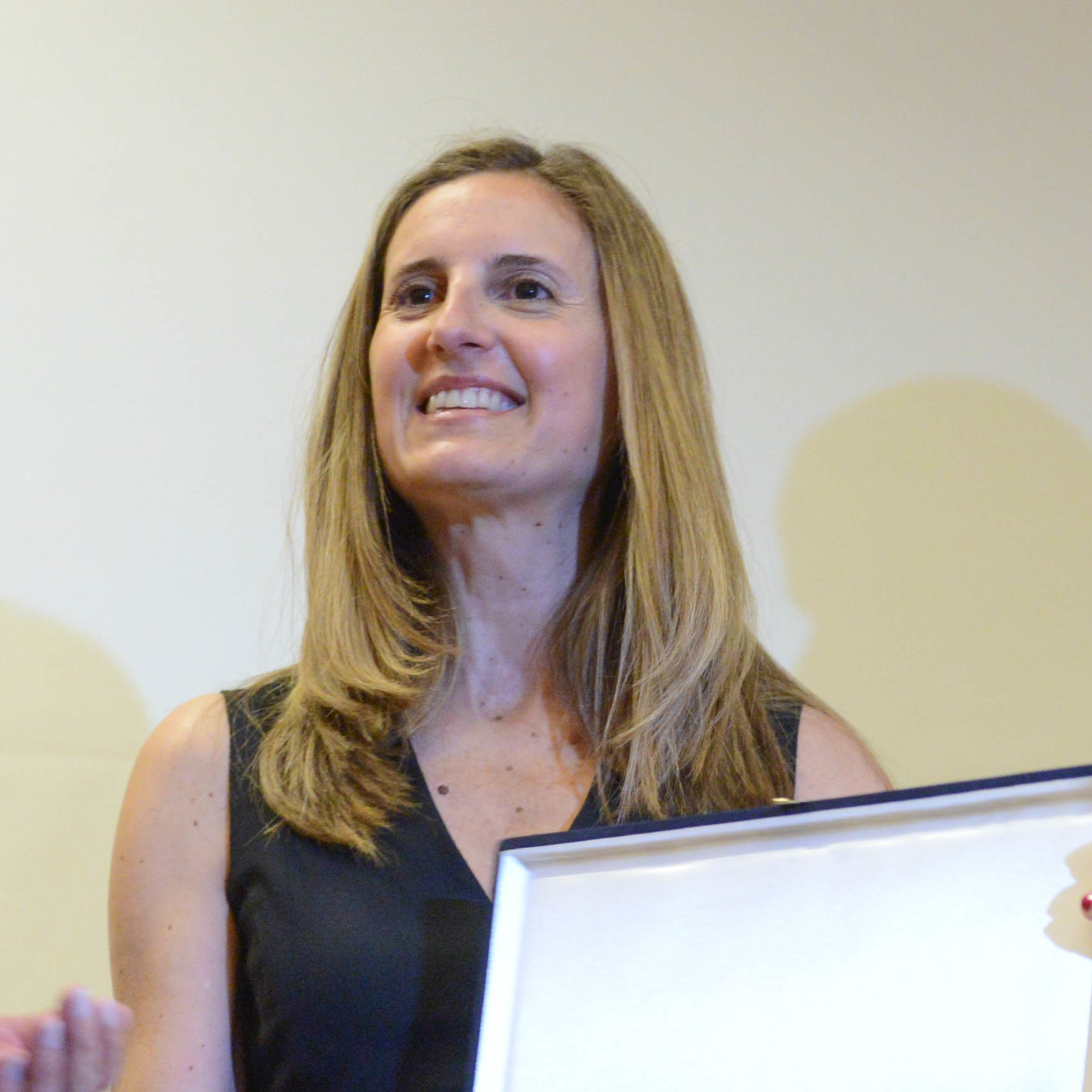
- Escobar in 2014
- Born: 1968 (age 56–57); Chile
- Education: Pontifical Catholic University of Chile
- Occupations: magazine editor; columnist; journalist; professor; writer
- Awards: Lenka Franulic Award (2014); 100 Women, BBC (2015)

Paula Escobar Chavarría (born 1968) is a Chilean editor, columnist, journalist, professor and writer. She is a recipient of the Lenka Franulic Award. She is an opinion columnist at La Tercera, host and panelist on CNN Chile, Founder and executive director of The Women and Media Chair at Universidad Diego Portales, and tenured professor at The Faculty of Communications of UDP.

== Early life ==
Paula Escobar studied journalism at the Pontifical Catholic University of Chile and has a master’s degree in Comparative Literature.

== Career ==
She was a journalist for the Pluma y Pincel magazine between 1987 and 1988. Between 1988 and 2001, she worked at the Caras magazine as a journalist, director and editor. At the same time, between 1999 and 2001, she was the managing editor of Televisa Chile.

Between 2001 and 2020, she was the editor for all the magazines under El Mercurio Newspaper. In 2014, she banned the use of digital retouching in the newspaper’s supplements, the use of underage and underweight models, and the publication of miracle diets.

She has been a columnist for The Huffington Post (2011-2016), and La Tercera. She currently works in television, as a presenter for the TV program Influential and as a panelist for Tolerancia Cero, both on CNN Chile.

She has taught at Pontifical Catholic University of Chile and at Universidad Diego Portales. In the latter, she is executive director of the Women and Media chair and an academic at the School of Journalism. She was president of the Magazines Commission of the National Press Association of Chile and vice president of the National Association of Women Journalists of Chile. She has also been vice president of Comunidad Mujer, member of the Gender Parity Initiative of the World Economic Forum and member of the board of the Young Global Leaders Foundation of the WEF, based in Geneva.

== Other activities ==
- The New Humanitarian, Member of the Board of Directors (2021–present)

== Publications ==
- Los secretos de Totó (2002) (ISBN 9562392317)
- 24/24 Un día en la vida de 24 mujeres chilenas (2005), junto con Karim Gálvez y Pilar Segovia. (ISBN 978-956-239-409-3)
- Retratos de innovadores (2009) (ISBN 9789562396981)
- Una historia de las revistas chilenas (2012) (with Cecilia García Huidobro)
- Yo, presidente/a (2014) (ISBN 978-956-324-302-4)
- Conversaciones con María Teresa Ruiz (2018)
- El año de la Plaga (2020), (with Francisco Javier Olea)
- Un Mundo Incierto: Treinta Conversaciones (2021)
- Un Mundo Alerta (2022)

== Awards and recognition ==
She has received several awards, including:

- Young Global Leader, World Economic Forum (2006)
- Yale World Fellow, Yale (2012)
- Premio Lenka Franulic (2014)
- 100 Women, BBC (2015)
- Energía de Mujer award (2015)
- Periodismo de Excelencia award UAH, Written press category (2018)
- Poynter Fellow in Journalism, Yale (2020)
- Premio al Liderazgo, International Women's Forum, Chilean chapter (2020)
