= Pedro Jesús Rodríguez =

Chilean lawyer, academic, business leader, and politician

Pedro Jesús Rodríguez González (1907–1982) was a Chilean lawyer, academic, business leader and Chilean Christian Democrat politician, Minister of state during the first part of the administration of President Eduardo Frei Montalva. He was born in Valparaíso on September 25, 1907 and died in Santiago on July 7, 1982. His parents were Pedro Rodriguez Rozas and Josefina González Otaegui.

== Education ==
He studied at the Lyceum of the German capital and later entered the School of Law, Catholic University, where he graduated as a lawyer in 1930.

== Career ==
In 1942, along with his partner Jose Fuenzalida Balbontín, he was a driving force in the urbanization of the La Dehesa ranch, which he later consolidated as one of the main sectors of the eastern part of the capital.

He was an integral attorney of the Supreme Court between 1953 and 1958 and president of the Bar Association in 1963.

He was also one of the founding members of the Chilean Christian Democratic Party and as such was called to serve in the government of his comrade Frei Montalva as Justice Minister.
