= University of Leuven =

University of Leuven or University of Louvain (French: Université de Louvain; Dutch: Universiteit Leuven) may refer to:

- Old University of Leuven (1425–1797)
- State University of Leuven (1817–1835)
- Catholic University of Leuven (1834–1968)
- Katholieke Universiteit Leuven or KU Leuven (1968–), a Dutch-speaking university in Leuven
- Université catholique de Louvain or UCLouvain (1968–), a French-speaking university in Louvain-la-Neuve, Brussels, Mons, Namur, Charleroi and Tournai

== See also ==
- Split of the Catholic University of Leuven
- Universities in Leuven
- Leuven University Press
