= Raquel Correa =

Chilean journalist

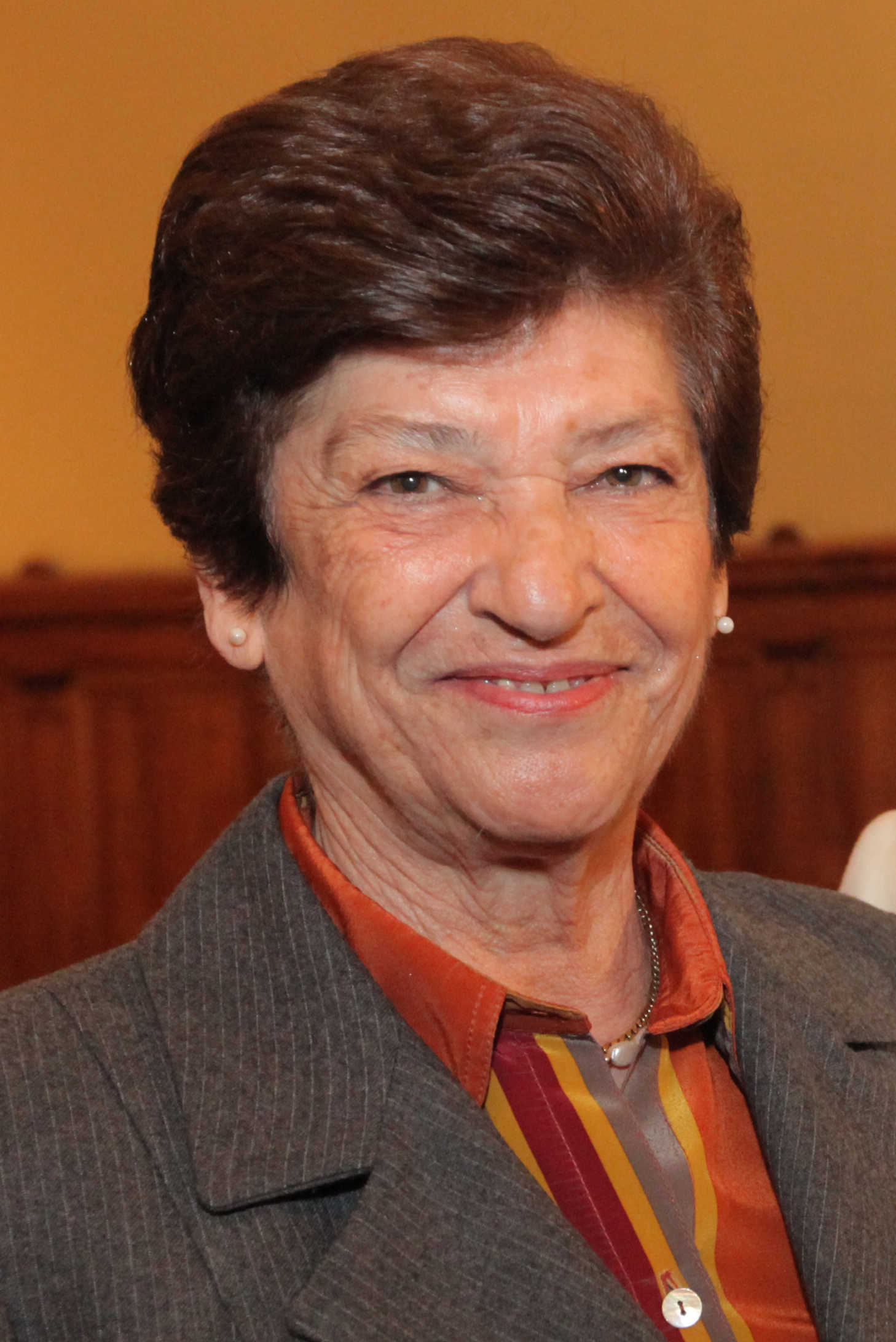
Raquel Correa.

Raquel Teresa Correa (8 July 1934 – 10 September 2012) was a Chilean journalist who spent the main part of her career with the newspaper El Mercurio. She was well known for her interviews and reporting, and was the recipient of Chile's National Prize for Journalism in 1991.
