= Ercilla (magazine) =

News Magazine in Chile (1936–2015)

Ercilla was a biweekly news magazine published in Santiago, Chile. The magazine was in circulation between 1936 and April 2015. Its title is a reference to Alonso de Ercilla who wrote the first epic poem in Spanish in Chile.

== History and profile ==
Ercilla was established in 1936. The magazine was published on a biweekly basis and had its headquarters in Santiago. It featured articles on news and cultural events. The magazine was published by a state-controlled company, Zig-Zag, which was later renamed Quimantu, until the coup d'état in Chile in 1973. However, the magazine had an independent editorial stance and in fact, was critical of Salvador Allende just before the collapse of the Allende government. In addition it held a conservative stance until the coup.

Sergio Mujica was the owner of Ercilla until March 1976 when it was seized and was sold to a company owned by the Pinochet supporters.

In November 1991 Ercilla temporarily ceased publication.
